= 2023–24 US Alessandria Calcio 1912 season =

US Alessandria Calcio 1912
2023–24 season
- Manager: Fulvio Fiorin (until 22 September); Vitantonio Zaza (caretaker, 23 September–4 October); Marco Banchini (from 4 October to 21 November); Sergio Pirozzi (from 23 November to 27 December); Marco Banchini (from 28 December to 17 March); Jonatan Binotto (from 18 March)
- Stadium: Stadio Giuseppe Moccagatta
- Serie C: 20th (relegated)
- Coppa Italia Serie C: Second round
- Top goalscorer: League: Marwen Gazoul (4); All: Marwen Gazoul (4)
- Biggest win: Alessandria 3–0 Pergolettese
- Biggest defeat: Alessandria 0–3 Lumezzane; Alessandria 0–3 Triestina; Virtus Entella 3–0 Alessandria

The 2023–24 season was US Alessandria Calcio 1912's 112th season in existence and second consecutive season in the Serie C. They also competed in the Coppa Italia Serie C.

== Players ==
=== First-team squad ===
As of 2 September 2023

Note: Flags indicate national team as defined under FIFA eligibility rules; some limited exceptions apply. Players may hold more than one non-FIFA nationality.

No.	Pos.	Nation	Player
1	GK	ITA	Luca Liverani
3	DF	ITA	Enrico Rossi
4	MF	ITA	Marco Nichetti
6	DF	ITA	Daniele Belgiovine
7	FW	MAR	Marwen Gazoul
8	DF	GRE	Arensi Rota
10	FW	ITA	Mattia Pagliuca (on loan from Bologna)
11	FW	ITA	Gennaro Anatriello (on loan from Bologna)
12	GK	ITA	Leonardo Rossi
14	MF	ITA	Alessandro Pellitteri
15	FW	ITA	Antonio Ronci
17	DF	ALB	Ertijon Gega (on loan from Sampdoria)
18	MF	ITA	Lorenzo Pellegrini
19	FW	GAM	Kalifa Manneh
21	DF	ITA	Leonardo Nunzella

No.	Pos.	Nation	Player
22	GK	ITA	Ramon Virano
23	DF	ITA	Simone Ciancio
24	MF	ITA	Alessandro Mastalli
26	DF	SEN	Ndir Mame Ass (on loan from Ternana)
27	MF	ITA	Mauro Ghiozzi
30	DF	ITA	Diego Gueli
31	DF	ITA	Luca Ercolani
32	DF	ITA	Lorenzo Giubilato
66	MF	ITA	Alfonso Sepe (on loan from Sampdoria)
72	MF	USA	Claudio Vaughn
77	FW	ITA	Patrizio Zerbo
90	FW	ITA	Michele Volpe
99	GK	ITA	Edoardo Piana (on loan from Udinese)
—	DF	FRA	Théo Parrinello

=== Out on loan ===
Note: Flags indicate national team as defined under FIFA eligibility rules; some limited exceptions apply. Players may hold more than one non-FIFA nationality.

No.	Pos.	Nation	Player
—	MF	ITA	Lorenzo Podda (at Sestri Levante until 30 June 2024)

== Transfers ==
=== In ===
Pos.	Player	Transferred from	Fee	Date	Source
DF	(Italy) Simone Ciancio	(Italy) Novara	Free	18 July 2023	
MF	(Italy) Alessandro Mastalli	(Italy) Lucchese	Free	1 September 2023	

=== Out ===
Pos.	Player	Transferred to	Fee	Date	Source
MF	(Italy) Davide Lamesta	(Italy) Rimini	€30,000	8 August 2023	

== Pre-season and friendlies ==
Win Draw Loss Fixtures

30 July 2023 Friendly	Alessandria (Italy)	0–1	(Italy) Sampdoria
20:00 CEST (UTC+2)			La Gumina 25'

5 August 2023 Friendly	Alessandria (Italy)	2–1	(Italy) Chieri	Spinetta Marengo
10:30 CEST (UTC+2)	Ronci 42'; Ghiozzi 69'	Report		Referee: Emiliano Gallione

26 August 2023 Friendly	Alessandria (Italy)	0–1	(Italy) Juventus Next Gen	Alessandria
17:00 CEST (UTC+2)			Turicchia 26'	Stadium: Stadio Giuseppe Moccagatta; Referee: Gabriele Restaldo

== Competitions ==
=== Overall record ===
Competition	First match	Last match	Starting round	Final position	Record							
Competition	First match	Last match	Starting round	Final position	Pld	W	D	L	GF	GA	GD	Win %
Serie C	4 September 2023	28 April 2024	Matchday 1	20th	38	5	8	25	20	48	−28	13.16
Coppa Italia Serie C	3 October 2023	8 November 2023	First round	Second round	2	1	0	1	2	3	−1	50.00
Total					40	6	8	26	22	51	−29	15.00

Source: Flashscore

=== Serie C ===
==== League table ====
Pos	Team	Pld	W	D	L	GF	GA	GD	Pts	Qualification
16	Arzignano	38	10	14	14	32	37	−5	44	
17	Novara (O)	38	8	19	11	39	49	−10	43	Relegation play-outs
18	Fiorenzuola (R)	38	10	8	20	38	62	−24	38	Relegation play-outs
19	Pro Sesto (Note: Automatically relegated for having more than eight points of distance from 16th-placed team Arzignano.) (R)	38	7	14	17	25	40	−15	35	Relegation to Serie D
20	Alessandria (Note: 3 points deducted due to irregularities in the June 2023 salary payments and due to further administrative irregularities) (R)	38	5	8	25	20	48	−28	20	Relegation to Serie D

Updated to match(es) played on 28 April 2024. Source: Lega Pro, Soccerway (in English)
Rules for classification: 1) Points; 2) Head-to-head points; 3) Head-to-head goal difference; 4) Goal difference; 5) Goals scored; 6) Lower goals against; 7) Wins; 8) Lower losses; 9) Away wins; 10) Lower home losses.
(Note: Head-to-head record is used only after all the matches between the teams in question have been played)
(O) Play-off winners; (R) Relegated

==== Results summary ====
Overall								Home						Away					
Pld	W	D	L	GF	GA	GD	Pts	W	D	L	GF	GA	GD	W	D	L	GF	GA	GD
38	5	8	25	20	48	−28	23	2	4	13	10	23	−13	3	4	12	10	25	−15

Source: Worldfootball

==== Results by round ====
Round	1	2	3	4	5	6	7	8	9	10	11	12	13	14	15	16	17	18	19	20	21	22	23	24	25	26	27	28	29	30	31	32	33	34	35	36	37	38
Ground	H	A	H	A	H	H	A	H	A	H	A	H	A	H	A	H	A	H	A	A	H	A	H	A	H	H	A	H	A	H	A	H	A	H	A	H	A	H
Result	D	L	L	L	L	L	L	W	D	W	D	L	W	L	L	L	D	D	L	L	L	L	D	L	W	L	L	L	W	L	L	L	L	D	L	L	D	L
Position	10	16	17	19	20	20	20	20	19	19	18	18	17	18	18	19	19	18	19	19	20	20	20	20	20	20	20	20	20	20	20	20	20	20	20	20	20	20

Source: Worldfootball
A = Away; H = Home; W = Win; D = Draw; L = Loss

==== Matches ====
The league fixtures were unveiled on 7 August 2023.

4 September 2023 1	Alessandria	0–0	Novara	Alessandria
20:45 CEST (UTC+2)		Report		Stadium: Stadio Giuseppe Moccagatta; Referee: Andrea Bordin

10 September 2023 2	Virtus Verona	2–1	Alessandria	Verona
16:15 CEST (UTC+2)	Faedo 36'; Cabianca 54'	Report	Gazoul 47'	Stadium: Stadio Gavagnin-Nocini; Referee: Lorenzo Maccarini

17 September 2023 3	Alessandria	1–2	Padova	Alessandria
18:30 CEST (UTC+2)	Anatriello 26'; Rota (yellow card) 59' (yellow-red card) 68'		Liguori 12'; Favale 90+4'	Stadium: Stadio Giuseppe Moccagatta; Referee: Daniele Virgilio

20 September 2023 4	Arzignano Valchiampo	1–0	Alessandria	Arzignano
18:30 CEST (UTC+2)	Antoniazzi 31'	Report		Stadium: Stadio Tommaso Dal Molin; Referee: Francesco D'Eusanio

24 September 2023 5	Alessandria	0–3	Lumezzane	Alessandria
14:00 CEST (UTC+2)		Report	Malotti 30'; Poledri 90+1'; Capelli 90+3'	Stadium: Stadio Giuseppe Moccagatta; Referee: Antonio Di Reda

29 September 2023 6	Alessandria	0–2	Pro Sesto	Alessandria
14:00 CEST (UTC+2)			Barranca 44', 77'	Stadium: Stadio Giuseppe Moccagatta; Attendance: 1,000; Referee: Edoardo Manedo Mazzoni

6 October 2023 7	Mantova	2–0	Alessandria	Mantua
20:45 CEST (UTC+2)	Nichetti 4' (o.g.); Fiori 57'			Stadium: Stadio Danilo Martelli; Referee: Francesco Zago

21 October 2023 9	AlbinoLeffe	0–0	Alessandria	Zanica
20:45 CEST (UTC+2)	Longo (red card) 81'		Gazoul (yellow card) 19' (yellow-red card) 40'	Stadium: AlbinoLeffe Stadium; Referee: Alfredo Iannello

24 October 2023 10	Alessandria	3–0	Pergolettese	Alessandria
18:30 CEST (UTC+2)	Siafá 14'; Mastalli 50', 54'		Aucelli (red card) 15'	Stadium: Stadio Giuseppe Moccagatta; Referee: Lucio Felice Angelillo

28 October 2023 11	Trento	1–1	Alessandria	Trento
18:30 CEST (UTC+2)	Trainotti 25'		Gazoul 67'	Stadium: Stadio Briamasco; Referee: Giorgio Di Cicco

31 October 2023 8	Alessandria	2–0	Atalanta U23	Alessandria
20:45 CET (UTC+1)	Siafá 39'; Gazoul 88'			Stadium: Stadio Giuseppe Moccagatta; Referee: Matteo Centi

4 November 2023 12	Alessandria	0–3	Triestina	Alessandria
16:15 CET (UTC+1)			Redan 9', 44', 88'	Stadium: Stadio Giuseppe Moccagatta; Referee: Giuseppe Mucera

12 November 2023 13	Renate	0–2	Alessandria	Meda
20:45 CET (UTC+1)			Nichetti 10'; Sepe 22'	Stadium: Stadio Città di Meda; Referee: Felipe Salvatore Viapiana

18 November 2023 14	Alessandria	1–2	Giana Erminio	Alessandria
14:00 CET (UTC+1)	Mastalli 37'		Fumagalli 83'; Franzoni 90+4'	Stadium: Stadio Giuseppe Moccagatta; Referee: Cristiano Ursini

25 November 2023 15	Pro Vercelli	2–0	Alessandria	Vercelli
18:30 CET (UTC+1)	Haoudi 38'; Maggio 86'			Stadium: Stadio Silvio Piola; Referee: Domenico Castellone

3 December 2023 16	Alessandria	0–1	Fiorenzuola	Alessandria
16:15 CET (UTC+1)			Alberti 38'	Stadium: Stadio Giuseppe Moccagatta; Attendance: 800; Referee: Alberto Poli

8 December 2023 17	Pro Patria	1–1	Alessandria	Busto Arsizio
14:00 CET (UTC+1)	Renault 8'; Parker (penalty missed) 23'		Foresta 75'	Stadium: Stadio Carlo Speroni; Referee: Gabriele Totaro

17 December 2023 18	Alessandria	0–0	Legnago Salus	Alessandria
16:15 CET (UTC+1)				Stadium: Stadio Giuseppe Moccagatta; Referee: Giuseppe Rispoli

22 December 2023 19	Vicenza	1–0	Alessandria	Vicenza
20:45 CET (UTC+1)	Pellegrini 61'			Stadium: Stadio Romeo Menti; Referee: Marco Emmanuele

6 January 2024 20	Novara	1–0	Alessandria	Novara
14:00 CET (UTC+1)				Stadium: Stadio Silvio Piola

14 January 2024 21	Alessandria	0–1	Virtus Verona	Alessandria
14:00 CET (UTC+1)				Stadium: Stadio Giuseppe Moccagatta

20 January 2024 22	Padova	1–0	Alessandria	Padua
18:30 CET (UTC+1)				Stadium: Stadio Euganeo

27 January 2024 23	Alessandria	0–0	Arzignano Valchiampo	Alessandria
16:15 CET (UTC+1)				Stadium: Stadio Giuseppe Moccagatta

4 February 2024 24	Lumezzane	2–1	Alessandria	Lumezzane
16:15 CET (UTC+1)				Stadium: Stadio Tullio Saleri

13 February 2024 26	Alessandria	0–1	Mantova	Alessandria
20:45 CET (UTC+1)				Stadium: Stadio Giuseppe Moccagatta

18 February 2024 27	Atalanta U23	2–0	Alessandria	Caravaggio
18:30 CET (UTC+1)				Stadium: Stadio Comunale; Referee: Mattia Nigro

21 February 2024 25	Pro Sesto	1–2	Alessandria	Sesto San Giovanni
18:30 CET (UTC+1)	Bruschi 59'		Samele 34'; Siafá 54'	Stadium: Stadio Ernesto Breda; Referee: Domenico Mirabella
Note: Postpond from 9 February.

24 February 2024 28	Alessandria	0–1	AlbinoLeffe	Alessandria
18:30 CET (UTC+1)			Gușu 45'	Stadium: Stadio Giuseppe Moccagatta; Referee: Gioele Iacobellis

1 March 2024 29	Pergolettese	0–1	Alessandria	Crema
20:45 CET (UTC+1)			Samele 90+5'	Stadium: Stadio Giuseppe Voltini; Referee: Enrico Gemelli

5 March 2024 30	Alessandria	0–1	Trento	Alessandria
18:30 CET (UTC+1)				Stadium: Stadio Giuseppe Moccagatta

30 March 2024 34	Alessandria	1–1	Pro Vercelli	Alessandria
20:45 CEST (UTC+2)				Stadium: Stadio Giuseppe Moccagatta; Referee: Enrico Gigliotti

6 April 2024 35	Fiorenzuola	2–0	Alessandria	Fiorenzuola d'Arda
18:30 CEST (UTC+2)				Stadium: Stadio Comunale

13 April 2024 36	Alessandria	1–2	Pro Patria	Alessandria
18:30 CEST (UTC+2)	Mastalli 15'		Castelli 5', 25'; Saporetti (yellow card) 39' (yellow-red card) 63'	Stadium: Stadio Giuseppe Moccagatta; Referee: Fabrizio Ramondino

20 April 2024 37	Legnago Salus	0–0	Alessandria	Legnago
18:30 CEST (UTC+2)				Stadium: Stadio Mario Sandrini; Referee: Gianluca Catanzaro

28 April 2024 38	Alessandria	1–2	Vicenza	Alessandria
16:30 CEST (UTC+2)	Busatto 37' (pen.); Gega (yellow card) 46' (yellow-red card) 71'		Busato 89'; Ferrari 90+5' (pen.)	Stadium: Stadio Giuseppe Moccagatta; Referee: Andrea Zoppi

=== Coppa Italia Serie C ===
3 October 2023 First round	Alessandria	2–0	Pergolettese	Alessandria
18:30 CEST (UTC+2)	Anatriello 90+1'; Pagliuca 90+3'			Stadium: Stadio Giuseppe Moccagatta; Referee: Lucio Felice Angelillo

8 November 2023 Second round	Virtus Entella	3–0	Alessandria	Chiavari
18:30 CET (UTC+1)	Disanto 39'; Faggioli 73'; Clemenza 90+2'			Stadium: Stadio Comunale; Referee: Abdoulaye Diop
