= 2023–24 Feralpisalò season =

Feralpisalò
2023–24 season
- Manager: Stefano Vecchi (until 23 October); Marco Zaffaroni (from 23 October)
- Stadium: Stadio Lino Turina
- Serie B: 19th (relegated)
- Coppa Italia: Round of 64
Home colours	Away colours	Third colours

The 2023–24 season was Feralpisalò's 15th season in existence and the club's first season in the top flight of Italian football. In addition to the domestic league, Feralpisalò participated in this season's edition of the Coppa Italia. The season covered the period from 1 July 2023 to 30 June 2024.

== Players ==
=== First-team squad ===
As of 1 February 2024

Note: Flags indicate national team as defined under FIFA eligibility rules; some limited exceptions apply. Players may hold more than one non-FIFA nationality.

No.	Pos.	Nation	Player
1	GK	ITA	Semuel Pizzignacco
2	DF	ITA	Gabriele Ferrarini (on loan from Fiorentina)
3	DF	ITA	Mattia Tonetto
4	DF	ROU	Marcus Păcurar
6	FW	ITA	Luca Giudici
7	MF	ITA	Davide Voltan
8	MF	ITA	Davide Balestrero
9	FW	CRO	Karlo Butić
10	FW	ITA	Davide Di Molfetta
11	FW	LTU	Edgaras Dubickas (on loan from Pisa)
14	FW	ITA	Mattia Compagnon (on loan from Juventus)
16	MF	ITA	Luca Fiordilino (on loan from Venezia)
17	DF	BUL	Dimo Krastev (on loan from Fiorentina)
18	GK	ITA	Luca Liverani
19	DF	ITA	Alessandro Pilati
20	MF	ITA	Mattia Zennaro

No.	Pos.	Nation	Player
21	MF	ITA	Federico Carraro
23	DF	ITA	Luca Ceppitelli
25	FW	ITA	Marco Sau
27	MF	ROU	Denis Hergheligiu
28	FW	ITA	Giacomo Manzari (on loan from Sassuolo)
29	DF	ITA	Mauro Verzeletti
39	MF	GRE	Christos Kourfalidis (on loan from Cagliari)
61	GK	ITA	Giacomo Volpe
66	DF	ITA	Federico Bergonzi (on loan from Atalanta)
70	MF	HAI	Christopher Attys (on loan from Trento)
77	FW	ALB	Brayan Gjyla
87	DF	ITA	Bruno Martella (on loan from Ternana)
91	FW	ITA	Andrea La Mantia (on loan from SPAL)
94	DF	ITA	Gaetano Letizia (on loan from Benevento)
97	FW	ITA	Mattia Felici (on loan from Triestina)
99	MF	ITA	Alessandro Pietrelli

=== Out on loan ===
Note: Flags indicate national team as defined under FIFA eligibility rules; some limited exceptions apply. Players may hold more than one non-FIFA nationality.

No.	Pos.	Nation	Player
—	DF	ITA	Michele Camporese (at Cosenza until 30 June 2024)
—	DF	ITA	Christian Dimarco (at Gubbio until 30 June 2024)
—	MF	ITA	Andrea Franzolini (at Legnago until 30 June 2024)

No.	Pos.	Nation	Player
—	MF	ITA	Mattia Musatti (at Fiorenzuola until 30 June 2024)
—	MF	ITA	Pietro Santarpia (at Pro Sesto until 30 June 2024)

== Transfers ==
=== In ===
Pos.	Player	Transferred from	Fee	Date	Source
MF	(Cape Verde) Alessio da Cruz	(Belgium) Mechelen	Undisclosed	1 July 2023	
FW	(Italy) Andrea La Mantia	(Italy) SPAL	Loan	8 August 2023	
MF	(Italy) Luca Fiordilino	(Italy) Venezia	Loan	28 August 2023	
MF	(Greece) Christos Kourfalidis	(Italy) Cagliari	Loan	1 September 2023	
DF	(Italy) Gaetano Letizia	(Italy) Benevento	Loan	1 September 2023	
FW	(Lithuania) Edgaras Dubickas	(Italy) Pisa	Loan	18 January 2024	

=== Out ===
Pos.	Player	Transferred to	Fee	Date	Source
DF	(Italy) Michele Camporese	(Italy) Cosenza	Loan	10 January 2024	
MF	(Cape Verde) Alessio da Cruz	Released		16 January 2024	

== Pre-season and friendlies ==
Win Draw Loss Fixtures

9 September 2023 Friendly	Sassuolo (Italy)	0–2	(Italy) Feralpisalò	Sassuolo
	Boloca (yellow card) 35'; Falasca (yellow card) 52'	Report	Compagnon 83'; Gjyla 90'	Stadium: Stadio Enzo Ricci; Referee: Marco Monaldi

== Competitions ==
=== Overview ===
Competition	First match	Last match	Starting round	Final position	Record							
Competition	First match	Last match	Starting round	Final position	Pld	W	D	L	GF	GA	GD	Win %
Serie B	20 August 2023	10 May 2024	Matchday 1	19th	38	8	9	21	44	65	−21	21.05
Coppa Italia	6 August 2023	14 August 2023	Preliminary round	Round of 64	2	1	0	1	3	3	+0	50.00
Total					40	9	9	22	47	68	−21	22.50

Source: Soccerway

=== Serie B ===
==== League table ====
Pos	Team	Pld	W	D	L	GF	GA	GD	Pts	Promotion, qualification or relegation
16	Ternana (R)	38	11	10	17	43	50	−7	43	Qualification for relegation play-out
17	Bari	38	8	17	13	38	49	−11	41 (Note: Bari finished ahead of Ascoli on head-to-head points: Bari 1–0 Ascoli, Ascoli 2–2 Bari.)	Qualification for relegation play-out
18	Ascoli (R)	38	9	14	15	38	42	−4	41	Relegation to Serie C
19	Feralpisalò (R)	38	8	9	21	44	65	−21	33	Relegation to Serie C
20	Lecco (R)	38	6	8	24	35	74	−39	26	Relegation to Serie C

Source: Soccerway (in English)
Rules for classification: 1) Points; 2) Head-to-head points; 3) Head-to-head goal difference; 4) Goal difference; 5) Goals scored; 6) Draw.
(Note: Head-to-head record is used only after all the matches between the teams in question have been played)
(R) Relegated

==== Results summary ====
Overall								Home						Away					
Pld	W	D	L	GF	GA	GD	Pts	W	D	L	GF	GA	GD	W	D	L	GF	GA	GD
38	8	9	21	44	65	−21	33	3	5	11	25	34	−9	5	4	10	19	31	−12

Source: Worldfootball

==== Results by round ====
Round	1	2	3	4	5	6	7	8	9	10	11	12	13	14	15	16	17	18	19	20	21	22	23	24	25	26	27	28	29	30	31	32	33	34	35	36	37	38
Ground	A	H	A	A	H	H	A	H	A	A	H	A	H	A	H	A	H	A	H	A	H	H	A	H	A	H	A	H	A	H	A	H	A	H	A	H	A	H
Result	L	L	L	L	D	L	W	L	D	L	L	D	D	L	L	L	W	W	D	L	W	W	D	L	L	L	W	L	W	L	W	D	L	L	D	D	L	L
Position	18	19	20	20	20	20	17	19	19	20	20	20	20	20	20	20	20	20	20	20	19	18	18	19	19	19	19	19	19	19	19	19	19	19	19	19	19	19

Source: Worldfootball
A = Away; H = Home; W = Win; D = Draw; L = Loss

==== Matches ====
The league fixtures were unveiled on 11 July 2023.

20 August 2023 1	Parma	2–0	Feralpisalò	Parma
20:30 CEST (UTC+2)		Report		Stadium: Stadio Ennio Tardini; Referee: Marco Monaldi

26 August 2023 2	Feralpisalò	0–2	Südtirol	Piacenza
20:30 CEST (UTC+2)		Report		Stadium: Stadio Leonardo Garilli; Referee: Matteo Gualtieri

29 August 2023 3	Ascoli	3–0	Feralpisalò	Ascoli Piceno
20:30 CEST (UTC+2)		Report		Stadium: Stadio Cino e Lillo Del Duca; Referee: Giuseppe Collu

2 September 2023 4	Palermo	3–0	Feralpisalò	Palermo
18:30 CEST (UTC+2)				Stadium: Stadio Renzo Barbera

16 September 2023 5	Feralpisalò	1–1	Modena	Piacenza
14:00 CEST (UTC+2)				Stadium: Stadio Leonardo Garilli

23 September 2023 6	Feralpisalò	0–1	Pisa	Piacenza
14:00 CEST (UTC+2)				Stadium: Stadio Leonardo Garilli

26 September 2023 7	Lecco	1–2	Feralpisalò	Lecco
18:15		Report		Stadium: Stadio Rigamonti-Ceppi; Referee: Daniele Rutella

30 September 2023 8	Feralpisalò	1–2	Spezia	Piacenza
				Stadium: Stadio Leonardo Garilli

6 October 2023 9	Brescia	1–1	Feralpisalò	Brescia

21 October 2023 10	Catanzaro	3–0	Feralpisalò	Catanzaro

28 October 2023 11	Feralpisalò	0–3	Reggiana	Piacenza
14:00 CEST (UTC+2)				Stadium: Stadio Leonardo Garilli

4 November 2023 12	Cosenza	1–1	Feralpisalò	Cosenza
14:00 CET (UTC+1)				Stadium: Stadio San Vito-Gigi Marulla; Referee: Matteo Gualtieri

11 November 2023 13	Feralpisalò	3–3	Bari	Piacenza
14:00 CET (UTC+1)				Stadium: Stadio Leonardo Garilli

25 November 2023 14	Como	2–1	Feralpisalò	Como
14:00 CET (UTC+1)				Stadium: Stadio Giuseppe Sinigaglia

2 December 2023 15	Feralpisalò	0–1	Cittadella	Piacenza
				Stadium: Stadio Leonardo Garilli

9 December 2023 16	Ternana	2–1	Feralpisalò	Terni

16 December 2023 17	Feralpisalò	1–0	Cremonese	Piacenza
				Stadium: Stadio Leonardo Garilli

23 December 2023 18	Sampdoria	2–3	Feralpisalò	Genoa

26 December 2023 19	Feralpisalò	2–2	Venezia	Piacenza
				Stadium: Stadio Leonardo Garilli

13 January 2024 20	Südtirol	1–0	Feralpisalò	Bolzano

20 January 2024 21	Feralpisalò	3–0	Catanzaro	Piacenza
				Stadium: Stadio Leonardo Garilli

27 January 2024 22	Feralpisalò	5–1	Lecco	Piacenza
				Stadium: Stadio Leonardo Garilli

3 February 2024 23	Reggiana	1–1	Feralpisalò	Reggio Emilia

10 February 2024 24	Feralpisalò	1–2	Palermo	Piacenza
				Stadium: Stadio Leonardo Garilli

17 February 2024 25	Bari	1–0	Feralpisalò	Bari
14:00 CET (UTC+1)	Sibilli 78' (pen.)			Stadium: Stadio San Nicola; Referee: Antonio Santoro

24 February 2024 26	Feralpisalò	0–1	Ascoli	Piacenza
14:00 CET (UTC+1)			Masini 32'	Stadium: Stadio Leonardo Garilli; Referee: Matteo Marcenaro

28 February 2024 27	Spezia	0–2	Feralpisalò	La Spezia

3 March 2024 28	Feralpisalò	1–3	Sampdoria	Piacenza
				Stadium: Stadio Leonardo Garilli

9 March 2024 29	Modena	2–3	Feralpisalò	Modena

16 March 2024 30	Feralpisalò	1–2	Parma	Piacenza
				Stadium: Stadio Leonardo Garilli

1 April 2024 31	Cremonese	0–1	Feralpisalò	Cremona

6 April 2024 32	Feralpisalò	2–2	Cosenza	Piacenza
14:00		Report		Stadium: Stadio Leonardo Garilli; Referee: Davide Ghersini

13 April 2024 33	Pisa	3–1	Feralpisalò	Pisa
14:00	Valoti 16', 90+4'; Arena 83'	Report	Dubickas 83'	Stadium: Arena Garibaldi; Referee: Marco Monaldi

20 April 2024 34	Feralpisalò	2–5	Como	Piacenza
14:00		Report		Stadium: Stadio Leonardo Garilli; Referee: Alessandro Prontera

27 April 2024 35	Cittadella	1–1	Feralpisalò	Cittadella
16:15	Carissoni 21'	Report	Pietrelli 90+4'	Stadium: Stadio Pier Cesare Tombolato; Referee: Luca Massimi

1 May 2024 36	Feralpisalò	2–2	Brescia	Piacenza
18:00	Dubickas 9'; La Mantia 29'	Report	Bisoli 4'; Papetti 42'	Stadium: Stadio Leonardo Garilli; Referee: Daniele Minelli

5 May 2024 37	Venezia	2–1	Feralpisalò	Venice
15:00	Pohjanpalo 60', 90+3'	Report	Compagnon 83'	Stadium: Stadio Pier Luigi Penzo; Referee: Michael Fabbri

10 May 2024 38	Feralpisalò	0–1	Ternana	Piacenza
20:30		Report	Distefano 25'	Stadium: Stadio Leonardo Garilli; Referee: Federico Dionisi

=== Coppa Italia ===
6 August 2023 Preliminary round	Feralpisalò	2–1	Vicenza	Piacenza
20:00 CEST (UTC+2)				Stadium: Stadio Leonardo Garilli; Attendance: 670; Referee: Marco Monaldi

14 August 2023 Round of 64	Torino	2–1	Feralpisalò	Turin
21:15 CEST (UTC+2)	Vojvoda 22', (yellow card) 68'; Ilić 85'	Report	Di Molfetta 17'; Bergonzi (yellow card) 35'	Stadium: Stadio Olimpico Grande Torino; Attendance: 9,067; Referee: Paride Tremolada
