= Andrea Vassallo (footballer) =

Italian footballer (born 1997)

Personal information
- Date of birth: 30 September 1997 (age 29)
- Place of birth: Milan, Italy
- Height: 1.80 m (5 ft 11 in)
- Positions: Forward; winger

Team information
- Current team: Saronno

Youth career
- 2014–2016: Milan

Senior career*
Years	Team	Apps	(Gls)
2016–2019	Bologna	0	(0)
2016–2017	→ Brescia (loan)	3	(1)
2017–2018	→ Carrarese (loan)	33	(6)
2018–2019	→ Catania (loan)	13	(1)
2019	→ Renate (loan)	4	(0)
2020–2021	Vis Artena	4	(0)
2021	Real Calepina	8	(1)
2021–2022	Accademia Pavese		
2022–2023	RG Ticino		
2023	Muggiò		
2023–2024	Pavia		
2024–2025	Leon		
2025	Sant'Angelo	3	(0)
2025–	Saronno		

International career^{‡}
2014–2015	Italy U18	5	(2)
2015	Italy U19	1	(0)
- * Club domestic league appearances and goals as of 5 October 2025 ‡ National team caps and goals as of 15 March 2018

Andrea Vassallo (born 30 September 1997) is an Italian footballer who plays for Eccellenza club Saronno.

== Club career ==
=== Bologna ===
==== Loan to Brescia ====
On 15 July 2016, Vassallo was signed by Serie B side Brescia on a season-long loan deal. On 7 August he made his debut for Brescia, as a substitute replacing Leonardo Morosini in the 71st minute of a 2–0 home defeat against Pisa in the second round of Coppa Italia. On 15 October, Vassallo made his Serie B debut, as a substitute replacing Andrea Caracciolo in the 74th minute of a 1–1 home draw against Salernitana. On 25 October he scored his first professional goal, as a substitute, in the 87th minute of a 2–1 home win over Vicenza. Vassallo ended his loan to Brescia with only 4 appearances, all as a substitute, and 1 goal. During this season he played also 6 matches with Brescia youth team.

==== Loan to Carrarese ====
On 20 July 2017, Vassallo was signed by Serie C side Carrarese on a season-long loan deal. On 27 August he made his Serie C debut for Carrarese as a substitute replacing Tommaso Biasci in the 85th minute of a 1–0 away win over Cuneo. On 4 October, Vassallo scored his first goal for Carrarese in the 29th minute of a 5–2 away win over Prato. On 15 October he scored his second goal in the 46th minute of a 2–2 away draw against Giana Erminio. On 9 November he played his first entire match for Carrarese, a 3–2 home defeat against Pisa. On 26 November, Vassallo scored his third goal in the 52nd minute of a 4–1 home win over Pontedera. Vassallo ended his season-long loan to Carrarese with 33 appearances, 6 goals and 3 assists.

==== Loan to Catania and Renate ====
On 14 July 2018, Vassallo was loaned to another Serie C club Catania on a season-long loan deal. On 29 September he made his Serie C debut for Catania as a substitute replacing Kalifa Manneh in the 66th minute of a 2–1 away win over Rende. On 16 October he was sent off, as a substitute, with a double yellow card in the 91st minute of a 3–1 home win over Trapani. One month later, on 17 November, he played his first entire match for the team, a 0–0 away draw against Juve Stabia. Ten days later he scored his first goal for Catania in the 39th minute of a 2–0 away win over Matera. However, in January 2019, his loan was interrupted and he left Catania with 13 appearances, only 5 as a starter and 1 goal.

On 30 January 2019, Vassallo was signed by Renate on a 6-month loan deal. On 16 February he made his debut for the club as a substitute replacing Davide Guglielmotti in the 81st minute of a 1–1 home draw against Pordenone. Two weeks later, on 3 March, Vassallo played his first match as a starter, a 1–0 home defeat against Ravenna, he was replaced by Alberto Spagnoli after 46 minutes. Vassallo ended his 6-month loan to Renate with only 4 appearances, but only 1 as a starter.

== International career ==
Vassallo represented Italy at Under-18 and Under-19 level. On 22 October 2014 he made his U-18 debut as a substitute replacing Simone Minelli in the 82nd minute of a 1–0 home defeat against Austria U-18. On 18 November 2014, Vassallo played his first entire match at U-18 and he scored his first international goal in the 86th minute of a 3–1 home win over Croatia U-18. On 12 May 2015 he scored his second goal at U-18 level in the 52nd minute of a 2–0 home win over Iran U-18. On 16 December 2015, Vassallo made his debut at U-19 level in a 4–1 home win over Serbia U-19, but he was replaced by Edoardo Soleri in the 8th minute for an injury.

== Career statistics ==
=== Club ===
As of 9 May 2019

Club	Season	League			Cup		Europe		Other		Total	
Club	Season	League	Apps	Goals	Apps	Goals	Apps	Goals	Apps	Goals	Apps	Goals
Brescia (loan)	2016–17	Serie B	3	1	1	0	—		—		4	1
Carrarese (loan)	2017–18	Serie C	33	6	0	0	—		—		33	6
Catania (loan)	2018–19	Serie C	13	1	0	0	—		—		13	1
Renate (loan)	2018–19	Serie C	4	0	—		—		—		4	0
Career total			53	8	1	0	—		—		54	8
