= 2022–23 US Sassuolo Calcio season =

Sassuolo
2022–23 season
- Owner: Mapei
- Chairman: Carlo Rossi
- Head coach: Alessio Dionisi
- Stadium: Mapei Stadium – Città del Tricolore
- Serie A: 13th
- Coppa Italia: Round of 64
- Top goalscorer: League: Domenico Berardi (12); All: Domenico Berardi (13)
- Biggest win: Sassuolo 5–0 Salernitana
- Biggest defeat: Napoli 4–0 Sassuolo
Home colours	Away colours	Third colours

The 2022–23 season was the 103rd season in the history of US Sassuolo Calcio and their tenth consecutive season in the top flight. The club participated in Serie A and the Coppa Italia.

== Players ==
As of 31 January 2023

Note: Flags indicate national team as defined under FIFA eligibility rules; some limited exceptions apply. Players may hold more than one non-FIFA nationality.

No.	Pos.	Nation	Player
3	DF	ITA	Riccardo Marchizza
6	DF	BRA	Rogério
7	MF	BRA	Matheus Henrique
8	MF	MAR	Abdou Harroui
9	FW	ITA	Andrea Pinamonti (on loan from Inter Milan)
10	FW	ITA	Domenico Berardi (vice-captain)
11	FW	URU	Agustín Álvarez
13	DF	ITA	Gian Marco Ferrari (captain)
14	MF	GEQ	Pedro Obiang
15	FW	NOR	Emil Konradsen Ceide
16	MF	ITA	Davide Frattesi
17	DF	TUR	Mert Müldür
19	DF	ITA	Filippo Romagna
20	MF	ALB	Nedim Bajrami (on loan from Empoli)

No.	Pos.	Nation	Player
21	DF	ITA	Nadir Zortea (on loan from Atalanta)
22	DF	GER	Jeremy Toljan
25	GK	ITA	Gianluca Pegolo
27	MF	FRA	Maxime Lopez
28	DF	CRO	Martin Erlić
30	GK	ITA	Gioele Zacchi
35	MF	ITA	Luca D'Andrea
42	MF	NOR	Kristian Thorstvedt
44	DF	BRA	Ruan
45	FW	FRA	Armand Laurienté
47	GK	ITA	Andrea Consigli
64	GK	ITA	Alessandro Russo
92	FW	FRA	Grégoire Defrel

=== Other players under contract ===
As of 31 January 2023

Note: Flags indicate national team as defined under FIFA eligibility rules; some limited exceptions apply. Players may hold more than one non-FIFA nationality.

No. / Pos. / Nation / Player; — / FW / GHA / Brian Oddei	No. / Pos. / Nation / Player; — / FW / FRA / Isaac Karamoko

=== Out on loan ===
As of 31 January 2023.

Note: Flags indicate national team as defined under FIFA eligibility rules; some limited exceptions apply. Players may hold more than one non-FIFA nationality.

No.	Pos.	Nation	Player
—	GK	ITA	Matteo Campani (at Vis Pesaro until 30 June 2023)
—	GK	ITA	Giacomo Satalino (at Carrarese until 30 June 2023)
—	GK	ITA	Stefano Turati (at Frosinone until 30 June 2023)
—	GK	ITA	Samuele Vitale (at Gelbison until 30 June 2023)
—	DF	TUR	Kaan Ayhan (at Galatasaray until 30 June 2023)
—	DF	GRE	Giorgos Kyriakopoulos (at Bologna until 30 June 2023)
—	DF	NED	Ryan Flamingo (at Vitesse until 30 June 2023)
—	DF	COL	Yeferson Paz (at Perugia until 30 June 2023)
—	DF	ITA	Stefano Piccinini (at Pergolettese until 30 June 2023)
—	DF	ITA	Matteo Pinelli (at Fidelis Andria until 30 June 2023)
—	DF	ITA	Matteo Saccani (at Pergolettese until 30 June 2023)
—	MF	ITA	Federico Artioli (at Pergolettese until 30 June 2023)
—	MF	ITA	Andrea Ghion (at Catanzaro until 30 June 2023)

No.	Pos.	Nation	Player
—	MF	ITA	Manuel Locatelli (at Juventus until 30 June 2023)
—	MF	ROU	Andrei Mărginean (at Novara until 30 June 2023)
—	MF	ITA	Alessandro Mercati (at Carrarese until 30 June 2023)
—	MF	ITA	Marco Sala (at Palermo until 30 June 2023)
—	MF	CIV	Hamed Traorè (at Bournemouth until 30 June 2023)
—	FW	FRA	Janis Antiste (at Amiens until 30 June 2023)
—	FW	ITA	Riccardo Ciervo (at Venezia until 30 June 2023)
—	FW	ITA	Giacomo Manzari (at Frosinone until 30 June 2023)
—	FW	ITA	Luca Moro (at Frosinone until 30 June 2023)
—	FW	ITA	Jacopo Pellegrini (at Reggiana until 30 June 2023)
—	FW	ITA	Giacomo Raspadori (at Napoli until 30 June 2023)
—	FW	ITA	Luigi Samele (at Audace Cerignola until 30 June 2023)

== Transfers ==
=== In ===
Date	Pos.	Player	Age	Coming From	Fee	Notes
17 June 2022	FW	(Uruguay) Agustín Álvarez	21	(Uruguay) Peñarol		
12 July 2022	MF	(Norway) Kristian Thorstvedt	23	(Belgium) Genk		

==== Loans in ====
Date	Pos.	Player	Age	Moving from	Fee	Notes
11 August 2022	FW	(Italy) Andrea Pinamonti	23	(Italy) Inter Milan		

=== Out ===
Date	Pos.	Player	Age	Moving to	Fee	Notes
8 July 2022	CB	(Romania) Vlad Chiricheș	32	(Italy) Cremonese		
26 July 2022	FW	(Italy) Gianluca Scamacca	23	(England) West Ham	£30.5M + £5M add-ons	
1 August 2022	MF	(Serbia) Filip Đuričić	30	(Italy) Sampdoria		

==== Loans out ====
Date	Pos.	Player	Age	Moving to	Fee	Notes
4 July 2022	FW	(Italy) Luca Moro	21	(Italy) Frosinone		
20 August 2022	FW	(Italy) Giacomo Raspadori	22	(Italy) Napoli		Obligation to buy

== Pre-season and friendlies ==
Win Draw Loss Fixtures

10 July 2022 Friendly	Sassuolo (Italy)	10–1	(Italy) Real Vicenza	Sterzing, Italy
18:00 CEST (UTC+2)	Matheus Henrique 5'; Berardi 10', 14' (pen.); Raspadori 36', 43'; Ceïde 39', 40', 44'; Álvarez 64'; Defrel 75'	Report	Amana 33'	Stadium: Centro Sportivo di Vipiteno; Referee: Marco Menozzi

16 July 2022 Friendly	Sassuolo (Italy)	3–1	(Czech Republic) Jablonec	Sterzing, Italy
18:00 CEST (UTC+2)	Frattesi 9'; Harroui 75'; Defrel 80'	Report	Sejk 28'	Stadium: Centro Sportivo di Vipiteno; Referee: Andrea Bordin (Italy)

21 July 2022 Friendly	Sassuolo (Italy)	2–0	(Italy) Südtirol	Sterzing, Italy
18:00 CEST (UTC+2)	Matheus Henrique 25'; Álvarez 83' (pen.)	Report		Stadium: Centro Sportivo di Vipiteno; Referee: Daniele Perenzoni

31 July 2022 Friendly	Reims (France)	2–2	(Italy) Sassuolo	Reims, France
20:00 CEST (UTC+2)	Van Bergen 20'; Zeneli 61'	Report	Ceide 64'; Raspadori 67'	Stadium: Stade Auguste-Delaune; Referee: Benoît Bastien (France)

4 August 2022 Friendly	Sassuolo (Italy)	4–1	(Italy) Vis Pesaro	Sassuolo, Italy
18:00 CEST (UTC+2)	Thorstvedt 34'; Lopez 44'; Álvarez 53'; Raspadori 84'	Report	Gucci 59'	Stadium: Stadio Enzo Ricci; Referee: Gianluca Manganiello

11 December 2022 Friendly	Sassuolo (Italy)	3–2	(France) Marseille	Marbella, Spain
16:00 CET (UTC+1)	Berardi 26'; Pinamonti 66'; Thorstvedt 90+2'		Sánchez 10'; Balerdi (red card) 34'; Payet 56'	Stadium: Marbella Football Center; Attendance: 0

17 December 2022 Friendly	Sassuolo (Italy)	1–2	(Netherlands) PSV Eindhoven	Marbella, Spain
15:00 CET (UTC+1)	Fratessi 58'		El-Ghazi 63'; Bakayoko 75'	Stadium: Estadio Municipal de Marbella

23 December 2022 Friendly	Empoli (Italy)	2–1	(Italy) Sassuolo	Empoli, Italy
16:00 CET (UTC+1)				Stadium: Stadio Carlo Castellani

29 December 2022 Friendly	Sassuolo (Italy)	0–1	(Italy) Internazionale	Reggio Emilia, Italy
17:00 CET (UTC+1)	Traorè (yellow card) 33'		Džeko 63'; Škriniar (yellow card) 67'; Barella (yellow card) 79'; Zanotti (yellow card) 90+2'	Stadium: Mapei Stadium – Città del Tricolore; Referee: Lorenzo Maggioni (Italy)

== Competitions ==
=== Overall record ===
Competition	First match	Last match	Starting round	Final position	Record							
Competition	First match	Last match	Starting round	Final position	Pld	W	D	L	GF	GA	GD	Win %
Serie A	15 August 2022	2 June 2023	Matchday 1	13th	38	12	9	17	47	61	−14	31.58
Coppa Italia	8 August 2022		Round of 64	Round of 64	1	0	0	1	2	3	−1	0.00
Total					39	12	9	18	49	64	−15	30.77

Source: Soccerway

=== Serie A ===
==== League table ====
Pos	Team	Pld	W	D	L	GF	GA	GD	Pts
11	Monza	38	14	10	14	48	52	−4	52
12	Udinese	38	11	13	14	47	48	−1	46
13	Sassuolo	38	12	9	17	47	61	−14	45
14	Empoli	38	10	13	15	37	49	−12	43
15	Salernitana	38	9	15	14	48	62	−14	42

Source: Serie A
Rules for classification: 1) Points; 2) Tiebreaker for Champions team and third relegated team; 3) Head-to-head points; 4) Head-to-head goal difference; 5) Goal difference; 6) Goals scored; 7) Draw. (Note: Head-to-head record is used only after all the matches between the teams in question have been played)

==== Results summary ====
Overall								Home						Away					
Pld	W	D	L	GF	GA	GD	Pts	W	D	L	GF	GA	GD	W	D	L	GF	GA	GD
38	12	9	17	47	61	−14	45	8	4	7	24	23	+1	4	5	10	23	38	−15

Source: Serie A

==== Results by round ====
Round	1	2	3	4	5	6	7	8	9	10	11	12	13	14	15	16	17	18	19	20	21	22	23	24	25	26	27	28	29	30	31	32	33	34	35	36	37	38
Ground	A	H	A	H	A	H	A	H	H	A	H	A	A	H	A	H	A	H	A	A	H	A	H	A	H	A	H	H	A	H	A	H	A	H	A	H	A	H
Result	L	W	D	D	D	L	W	W	L	L	W	L	L	D	L	L	L	L	D	W	W	D	L	W	W	W	W	D	L	W	L	W	L	D	L	L	D	L
Position	20	10	12	12	12	13	11	8	9	9	9	11	13	12	15	16	16	17	17	16	15	15	15	14	13	13	12	12	12	10	13	11	13	13	13	13	13	13

Source: Serie A
A = Away; H = Home; W = Win; D = Draw; L = Loss

==== Matches ====
The league fixtures were announced on 24 June 2022.

15 August 2022 1	Juventus	3–0	Sassuolo	Turin
20:45 CEST (UTC+2)	Locatelli (yellow card) 16'; Di María 26'; Vlahović 43' (pen.), 51'	Report	Thorstvedt (yellow card) 33'; Ferrari (yellow card) 41'; Matheus Henrique (yellow card) 69'	Stadium: Juventus Stadium; Attendance: 38,725; Referee: Antonio Rapuano

20 August 2022 2	Sassuolo	1–0	Lecce	Reggio Emilia
20:45 CEST (UTC+2)	Matheus Henrique (yellow card) 37'; Berardi 40', (yellow card) 55'; Rogério (yellow card) 66'; Frattesi (yellow card) 77'	Report	Gonzàlez (yellow card) 68'	Stadium: Mapei Stadium – Città del Tricolore; Attendance: 9,219; Referee: Andrea Colombo

27 August 2022 3	Spezia	2–2	Sassuolo	La Spezia
20:45 CEST (UTC+2)	Bastoni 30'; Nzola 45+4' (pen.); Ekdal (yellow card) 68' (yellow-red card) 82'	Report	Frattesi 27'; Ferrari (yellow card) 45+2'; Pinamonti 50'	Stadium: Stadio Alberto Picco; Attendance: 6,500; Referee: Francesco Cosso

30 August 2022 4	Sassuolo	0–0	Milan	Reggio Emilia
18:30 CEST (UTC+2)	Berardi (penalty missed) 22'; Frattesi (yellow card) 64'; Lopez (yellow card) 72'; Ferrari (yellow card) 76'; Defrel (yellow card) 86'; Álvarez (yellow card) 90+7'	Report	Hernandez (yellow card) 27'; Saelemaekers (yellow card) 43'	Stadium: Mapei Stadium – Città del Tricolore; Attendance: 18,053; Referee: Giovanni Ayroldi

4 September 2022 5	Cremonese	0–0	Sassuolo	Cremona
12:30 CEST (UTC+2)	Tsadjout (yellow card) 78'	Report	Thorstvedt (yellow card) 47'	Stadium: Stadio Giovanni Zini; Attendance: 9,105; Referee: Luca Pairetto

11 September 2022 6	Sassuolo	1–3	Udinese	Reggio Emilia
15:00 CEST (UTC+2)	Frattesi 33'; Ruan (red card) 44'; Lopez (yellow card) 72'	Report	Becão (yellow card) 8'; Ebosse (yellow card) 25'; Ehizibue (yellow card) 63'; Beto 75', 90+3'; Samardžić 90+1'	Stadium: Mapei Stadium – Città del Tricolore; Attendance: 8,694; Referee: Giacomo Camplone

17 September 2022 7	Torino	0–1	Sassuolo	Turin
20:45 CEST (UTC+2)	Buongiorno (yellow card) 10'; Lazaro (yellow card) 45+1'; Singo (yellow card) 57'; Linetty (yellow card) 84'	Report	Lopez (yellow card) 69'; Álvarez 90+3'	Stadium: Stadio Olimpico Grande Torino; Attendance: 14,822; Referee: Niccolò Baroni

2 October 2022 8	Sassuolo	5–0	Salernitana	Reggio Emilia
15:00 CEST (UTC+2)	Laurienté 12'; Pinamonti 39' (pen.); Thorstvedt 53'; Rogério (yellow card) 74'; Harroui 76'; Antiste 90+2'	Report	Vilhena (yellow card) 58'	Stadium: Mapei Stadium – Città del Tricolore; Attendance: 15,786; Referee: Maria Sole Ferrieri Caputi

8 October 2022 9	Sassuolo	1–2	Internazionale	Reggio Emilia
15:00 CEST (UTC+2)	Ferrari (yellow card) 21'; Frattesi 60'; Harroui (yellow card) 72'; Ruan (yellow card) 90+4'	Report	Asllani (yellow card) 19'; Džeko 44', 75'; D'Ambrosio (yellow card) 55'	Stadium: Mapei Stadium – Città del Tricolore; Attendance: 17,574; Referee: Simone Sozza

15 October 2022 10	Atalanta	2–1	Sassuolo	Bergamo
20:45 CEST (UTC+2)	Scalvini (yellow card) 16'; Pašalić 45+1'; Lookman 46'	Report	Kyriakopoulos (yellow card) 21', (goal) 41'; Pinamonti (yellow card) 24'; Thorstvedt (yellow card) 30'; Ferrari (yellow card) 83'	Stadium: Gewiss Stadium; Attendance: 17,772; Referee: Matteo Marcenaro

24 October 2022 11	Sassuolo	2–1	Hellas Verona	Reggio Emilia
20:45 CEST (UTC+2)	Laurienté 32'; Erlić (yellow card) 48'; Frattesi 74'	Report	Ceccherini 2', (yellow card) 27'; Faraoni (yellow card) 75'; Đurić (yellow card) 90+3'	Stadium: Mapei Stadium – Città del Tricolore; Attendance: 11,368; Referee: Alberto Santoro

29 October 2022 12	Napoli	4–0	Sassuolo	Naples
15:00 CEST (UTC+2)	Osimhen 4', 19', 77'; Kvaratskhelia 36'	Report	Lopez (yellow card) 75'; Laurienté (yellow card) 76' (yellow-red card) 84'	Stadium: Stadio Diego Armando Maradona; Attendance: 47,156; Referee: Antonio Rapuano

5 November 2022 13	Empoli	1–0	Sassuolo	Empoli
15:00 CET (UTC+1)	Marin (yellow card) 27'; Fazzini (yellow card) 54'; Baldanzi 64'	Report		Stadium: Stadio Carlo Castellani; Attendance: 7,834; Referee: Ermanno Feliciani

9 November 2022 14	Sassuolo	1–1	Roma	Reggio Emilia
18:30 CET (UTC+1)	Laurienté (yellow card) 38'; Ayhan (yellow card) 54'; Lopez (yellow card) 62'; Kyriakopoulos (yellow card) 68'; Pinamonti 85', (yellow card) 86'	Report	Zaniolo (yellow card) 26'; Cristante (yellow card) 73'; Abraham 80'; Mancini (yellow card) 90+3'	Stadium: Mapei Stadium – Città del Tricolore; Attendance: 16,665; Referee: Giovanni Ayroldi

12 November 2022 15	Bologna	3–0	Sassuolo	Bologna
20:45 CET (UTC+1)	Soumaoro (yellow card) 16'; Aebischer 30'; Arnautović 50'; Ferguson 78'	Report		Stadium: Stadio Renato Dall'Ara; Attendance: 20,811; Referee: Ivano Pezzuto

4 January 2023 16	Sassuolo	1–2	Sampdoria	Reggio Emilia
12:30 CET (UTC+1)	Berardi (yellow card) 58', (goal) 64' (pen.); Rogério (yellow card) 86'	Report	Gabbiadini 25'; Augello 28'; Vieira (yellow card) 37'; Amione (yellow card) 59'; Montevago (yellow card) 78'	Stadium: Mapei Stadium – Città del Tricolore; Attendance: 11,782; Referee: Fabio Maresca

7 January 2023 17	Fiorentina	2–1	Sassuolo	Florence
15:00 CET (UTC+1)	Milenković (yellow card) 10'; Saponara 48'; Dodô (yellow card) 57'; Castrovilli (yellow card) 75'; González 90+1' (pen.), (yellow card) 90+4'	Report	Traorè (yellow card) 19'; Ruan (yellow card) 26'; Berardi 57', (yellow card) 90+2'	Stadium: Stadio Artemio Franchi; Attendance: 29,695; Referee: Gianluca Manganiello

15 January 2023 18	Sassuolo	0–2	Lazio	Reggio Emilia
12:30 CET (UTC+1)	Toljan (yellow card) 45+1'; Ruan (yellow card) 45+2'; Rogério (yellow card) 64'; Erlić (yellow card) 83'; Lopez (yellow card) 88'	Report	Casale (yellow card) 18'; Cataldi (yellow card) 45+2'; Zaccagni 45+3'; Hysaj (yellow card) 65'; Felipe Anderson 90+4'	Stadium: Mapei Stadium – Città del Tricolore; Attendance: 10,059; Referee: Luca Pairetto

22 January 2023 19	Monza	1–1	Sassuolo	Monza
15:00 CET (UTC+1)	Caprari 60'; Colpani (yellow card) 71'; Valoti (yellow card) 88'	Report	Ferrari 13'; Laurienté (yellow card) 38'; Berardi (yellow card) 90+4'	Stadium: Stadio Brianteo; Attendance: 10,200; Referee: Alessandro Prontera

29 January 2023 20	Milan	2–5	Sassuolo	Milan
12:30 CET (UTC+1)	Giroud 24', (yellow card) 90+1'; Tonali (yellow card) 38'; Rebić (yellow card) 45+4'; Calabria (yellow card) 46'; Krunić (yellow card) 61'; Origi 81'; Gabbia (yellow card) 87'; Pobega (yellow card) 90+5'	Report	Defrel 19'; Frattesi 22', (yellow card) 73'; Berardi 30'; Laurienté 47' (pen.); Obiang (yellow card) 53'; Kyriakopoulos (yellow card) 61'; Matheus Henrique 79'; Ruan (yellow card) 90+2'	Stadium: San Siro; Attendance: 70,428; Referee: Antonio Giua

4 February 2023 21	Sassuolo	1–0	Atalanta	Reggio Emilia
20:45 CET (UTC+1)	Rogério (yellow card) 33'; Laurienté 55', (yellow card) 63'; Defrel (yellow card) 69'; Zortea (yellow card) 84'; Thorstvedt (yellow card) 90'	Report	Mæhle (red card) 30'; Scalvini (yellow card) 43'; Muriel (red card) 90+6'	Stadium: Mapei Stadium – Città del Tricolore; Attendance: 11,000; Referee: Matteo Marcenaro

12 February 2023 22	Udinese	2–2	Sassuolo	Udine
12:30 CET (UTC+1)	Udogie 1'; Bijol 28'; Ehizibue (yellow card) 55'; Pérez (yellow card) 81'	Report	Matheus Henrique 6'; Laurienté (yellow card) 31'; Pérez 45+2' (o.g.); Zortea (yellow card) 56'	Stadium: Stadio Friuli; Attendance: 20,912; Referee: Ivano Pezzuto

17 February 2023 23	Sassuolo	0–2	Napoli	Reggio Emilia
20:45 CET (UTC+1)	Laurienté (yellow card) 43'; Lopez (yellow card) 81'	Report	Kvaratskhelia 12'; Osimhen 33'; Elmas (yellow card) 53'; Zieliński (yellow card) 68'	Stadium: Mapei Stadium – Città del Tricolore; Attendance: 15,911; Referee: Andrea Colombo

25 February 2023 24	Lecce	0–1	Sassuolo	Lecce
20:45 CET (UTC+1)	Banda (yellow card) 17'; Baschirotto (yellow card) 74'	Report	Berardi (yellow card) 22'; Obiang (yellow card) 35'; Thorstvedt 65'	Stadium: Stadio Via del mare Attendance: 23,760; Referee: Niccolò Baroni

6 March 2023 25	Sassuolo	3–2	Cremonese	Reggio Emilia
18:30 CET (UTC+1)	Laurienté 26'; Frattesi 41'; Zortea (yellow card) 52'; Bajrami 90+2'	Report	Afena-Gyan (yellow card) 44'; Dessers 62', 83'; Vásquez (yellow card) 87'; Pickel (yellow card) 90+7'; Benassi (yellow card) 90+7'	Stadium: Mapei Stadium – Città del Tricolore; Attendance: 11,587; Referee: Francesco Fourneau

12 March 2023 26	Roma	3–4	Sassuolo	Rome
18:00 CET (UTC+1)	Smalling (yellow card) 9'; Zalewski 26'; Kumbulla (red card) 45+3'; Dybala 50'; Matić (yellow card) 54'; Ibañez (yellow card) 73'; Camara (yellow card) 86'; Wijnaldum 90+4'	Report	Laurienté 13', 18'; Berardi 45+4' (pen.); Lopez (yellow card) 50'; Ruan (yellow card) 59'; Pinamonti 75'	Stadium: Stadio Olimpico; Attendance: 60,816; Referee: Michael Fabbri

17 March 2023 27	Sassuolo	1–0	Spezia	Reggio Emilia
18:30 CET (UTC+1)	Berardi 71' (pen.)	Report	Nzola (yellow card) 66'; Amian (yellow card) 70'	Stadium: Mapei Stadium – Città del Tricolore; Attendance: 11,152; Referee: Davide Ghersini

3 April 2023 28	Sassuolo	1–1	Torino	Reggio Emilia
20:45 CEST (UTC+2)	Pinamonti 36'; Frattesi (yellow card) 75'	Report	Sanabria 66'; Linetty (yellow card) 90+5'	Stadium: Mapei Stadium – Città del Tricolore; Attendance: 12,894; Referee: Ivano Pezzuto

8 April 2023 29	Hellas Verona	2–1	Sassuolo	Verona
18:30 CEST (UTC+2)	Veloso (yellow card) 43'; Ceccherini 84'; Lasagna (yellow card) 85'; Magnani (yellow card) 90'; Gaich 90+5'	Report	Laurienté (yellow card) 20'; Harroui 34'; Ruan (yellow card) 48'; Pinamonti (yellow card) 57'; Lopez (yellow card) 90'	Stadium: Stadio Marcantonio Bentegodi; Attendance: 23,660; Referee: Francesco Fourneau

16 April 2023 30	Sassuolo	1–0	Juventus	Reggio Emilia
18:00 CEST (UTC+2)	Defrel 64'	Report	Chiesa (yellow card) 90+5'	Stadium: Mapei Stadium – Città del Tricolore; Attendance: 19,566; Referee: Antonio Rapuano

22 April 2023 31	Salernitana	3–0	Sassuolo	Salerno
15:00 CEST (UTC+2)	Pirola 9'; Dia 20'; Coulibaly 65'; Bronn (yellow card) 70'	Report	Matheus Henrique (yellow card) 78'; Ruan (yellow card) 80'	Stadium: Stadio Arechi; Attendance: 23,060; Referee: Giacomo Camplone

30 April 2023 32	Sassuolo	2–1	Empoli	Reggio Emilia
15:00 CEST (UTC+2)	Laurienté (yellow card) 26'; Lopez (yellow card) 62'; Pinamonti (red card) 74'; Berardi 82', 90+7' (pen.)	Report	Cambiaghi 11'; Bandinelli (yellow card) 63'	Stadium: Mapei Stadium – Città del Tricolore; Attendance: 10,267; Referee: Federico Dionisi

3 May 2023 33	Lazio	2–0	Sassuolo	Rome
21:00 CEST (UTC+2)	Felipe Anderson 14'; Luis Alberto (yellow card) 40'; Marušić (yellow card) 62'; Lazzari (yellow card) 84'; Bašić 90+2'	Report	Laurienté (yellow card) 27'; Berardi (yellow card) 41'; Ruan (yellow card) 51'; Zortea (yellow card) 60'; Toljan (yellow card) 82'	Stadium: Stadio Olimpico; Attendance: 38,000; Referee: Massimiliano Irrati

8 May 2023 34	Sassuolo	1–1	Bologna	Reggio Emilia
20:45 CEST (UTC+2)	Berardi 15'; Lopez (yellow card) 44'	Report	Posch (yellow card) 27'; Domínguez 42'	Stadium: Mapei Stadium – Città del Tricolore; Attendance: 13,664; Referee: Maria Sole Ferrieri Caputi

13 May 2023 35	Internazionale	4–2	Sassuolo	Milan
20:45 CEST (UTC+2)	Lukaku 41', 89'; Ruan 55' (o.g.); Martínez 58'; De Vrij (yellow card) 70'; Brozović (yellow card) 84'	Report	Defrel (yellow card) 30'; Ruan (yellow card) 42'; Matheus Henrique 63', (yellow card) 66'; Frattesi 77'	Stadium: San Siro; Attendance: 71,246; Referee: Matteo Marcenaro

19 May 2023 36	Sassuolo	1–2	Monza	Reggio Emilia
20:45 CEST (UTC+2)	Ruan (yellow card) 36' (yellow-red card) 68'; Berardi 45+6' (pen.)	Report	Marí (yellow card) 12'; Caprari (yellow card) 13'; Caldirola (yellow card) 40'; Mota (yellow card) 50'; Ciurria 60'; Marlon (yellow card) 72'; Pessina 90+3'	Stadium: Mapei Stadium – Città del Tricolore; Attendance: 11,745; Referee: Alberto Santoro

26 May 2023 37	Sampdoria	2–2	Sassuolo	Genoa
20:45 CEST (UTC+2)	Gabbiadini 8'; Oikonomou (yellow card) 53'; Erlić 78' (o.g.)	Report	Berardi 9'; Matheus Henrique 11'; Thorstvedt (yellow card) 15'; Harroui (yellow card) 49'	Stadium: Stadio Luigi Ferraris; Attendance: 18,430; Referee: Francesco Meraviglia

2 June 2023 38	Sassuolo	1–3	Fiorentina	Reggio Emilia
21:00 CEST (UTC+2)	Berardi (yellow card) 32', (goal) 71' (pen.); Ruan (yellow card) 55' (yellow-red card) 81'; Rogério (red card) 87'; Marchizza (yellow card) 90+2'	Report	Terzić (yellow card) 7'; Ranieri (yellow card) 32'; Kouamé (yellow card) 45'; Cabral 46', (yellow card) 70'; Saponara 79'; González 83'	Stadium: Mapei Stadium – Città del Tricolore; Attendance: 12,456; Referee: Matteo Marchetti

=== Coppa Italia ===
8 August 2022 Round of 64	Modena	3–2	Sassuolo	Modena
18:00 CEST (UTC+2)	Falcinelli 11'; Mosti 30', 52'; Panada (yellow card) 45+4'	Report	Berardi 45+2' (pen.); Ayhan 88'	Stadium: Stadio Alberto Braglia; Attendance: 7,274; Referee: Gianluca Aureliano
