= 2025–26 AC Ospitaletto Franciacorta season =

AC Ospitaletto Franciacorta
2025–26 season
- Manager: Andrea Quaresmini
- Stadium: Stadio Lino Turina
- Serie C: 18th
- Coppa Italia Serie C: Second round
- Biggest win: Lecco 0–1 Ospitaletto

The 2025–26 season is the 102nd in the history of Associazione Ospitaletto Franciacorta and the club's first season in the third tier of Italian football leagues since 1998. In addition to the domestic league, Ospitaletto competes in the Coppa Italia Serie C.

== Squad ==
=== Transfers In ===
Pos.	Player	Transferred from	Fee	Date	Source
FW	(Italy) Marco Bertoli	(Italy) Varesina	Free	1 July 2025	
MF	(Italy) Matteo Gualandris	(Italy) Feralpisalò	Free	3 July 2025	
FW	(Italy) Alessandro Torri	(Italy) Empoli	Loan	8 July 2025	
GK	(Italy) Luca Sonzogni	(Italy) Mantova	Loan	10 July 2025	
MF	(Italy) Mattia Ievoli	(Italy) Fiorentina U20	Loan	6 August 2025	
DF	(Albania) Samuele Sina	(Italy) Union Brescia	Loan	8 August 2025	
MF	(Ukraine) Vladyslav Nagrudnyi	(Italy) Cremonese U20	Loan	11 August 2025	
FW	(Italy) Andrea Pavanello	(Italy) Pisa	Loan	11 August 2025	
DF	(Italy) Saer Diop	(Italy) Union Brescia	Loan	1 September 2025	

=== Transfers Out ===
Pos.	Player	Transferred to	Fee	Date	Source
MF	(Italy) Matteo Gualandris	(Italy) Feralpisalò	Loan return	30 June 2025	
MF	(Italy) Simone Cantamessa	(Italy) Union Brescia	Loan return	30 June 2025	
DF	(Ivory Coast) Aboubakar Bakayoko	(Italy) Desenzano	Free	11 July 2025	
MF	(Albania) Frenci Qeros	(Italy) Varese	Free	11 July 2025	
MF	(Albania) Viserjan Lleshaj	(Italy) Rovato	Free	20 July 2025	
MF	(Senegal) Yves Baraye	(Italy) Desenzano	Free	24 August 2025	

== Friendlies ==
26 July 2025	Ospitaletto	2–1	Union Brescia	Piamborno
				Stadium: Campo sportivo di Piamborno; Attendance: 1,500

2 August 2025	Pergolettese	0–0	Ospitaletto

== Competitions ==
=== Overall record ===
Competition	First match	Last match	Starting round	Record							
Competition	First match	Last match	Starting round	Pld	W	D	L	GF	GA	GD	Win %
Serie C	23 August 2025	26 April 2026	Matchday 1	5	0	2	3	3	7	−4	0.00
Coppa Italia Serie C	17 August 2025		First round	1	1	0	0	1	0	+1	100.00
Total				6	1	2	3	4	7	−3	16.67

Last updated: 21 September 2025
Source: Competitions

=== Serie C ===
Group A

==== Results by round ====
Round	1	2	3	4	5
Ground	A	H	A	H	A
Result	L	D	D	L	L
Position	15	17			

Updated to match(es) played on 21 September 2025. Source:
A = Away; H = Home; W = Win; D = Draw; L = Loss

==== Matches ====
23 August 2025 1	Lecco	2–1	Ospitaletto	Lecco
21:00 UTC+2	Zanellato 16'; Šipoš 22'		Guarneri 57'	Stadium: Stadio Rigamonti-Ceppi; Attendance: 2,619; Referee: Michele Maccorin

31 August 2025 2	Ospitaletto	0–0	Vicenza	Salò
21:00 UTC+2				Stadium: Stadio Lino Turina; Attendance: 1,097; Referee: Gabriele Sacchi

7 September 2025 3	Triestina	1–1	Ospitaletto	Trieste
15:00 UTC+2	Gündüz 40', (yellow card) 70' (yellow-red card) 75'		Gualandris 69'; Messaggi (penalty missed) 88'	Stadium: Stadio Nereo Rocco; Referee: Gabriele Totaro

12 September 2025 4	Ospitaletto	1–2	Pergolettese	Salò
20:30 UTC+2	Gobbi 39'; Possenti (red card) 59'		Dore 35'; Ferrandino 75'	Stadium: Stadio Lino Turina; Attendance: 411; Referee: Andrea Bortolussi

21 September 2025 5	Lumezzane	2–0	Ospitaletto	Lumezzane
17:30 UTC+2	Malotti 40'; Rolando 69'		Sina (red card) 90+2'	Stadium: Stadio Tullio Saleri; Referee: Andrea Zoppi

=== Coppa Italia Serie C ===
17 August 2025 First round	Lecco	0–1	Ospitaletto	Lecco
18:00			Bertoli 69'	Stadium: Stadio Rigamonti-Ceppi; Referee: Vittorio Emanuele Teghille

28–30 October 2025 Second round	Ospitaletto	v	Inter U23
