= Samuele Sina =

Albanian footballer (born 2007)

Personal information
- Date of birth: 14 February 2007 (age 19)
- Place of birth: Iseo, Italy
- Height: 1.89 m (6 ft 2 in)
- Position: Defender

Team information
- Current team: Union Brescia
- Number: 95

Youth career
- 2019–2022: Inter Milan
- 2022–2023: Sporting Franciacorta
- 2023–2024: Feralpisalò

Senior career*
| Years | Team | Apps | (Gls) |
| 2024–2025 | Feralpisalò | 0 | (0) |
| 2025– | Union Brescia | 12 | (2) |
| 2025–2026 | → Ospitaletto (loan) | 25 | (0) |

International career^{‡}
| 2023 | Albania U17 | 4 | (0) |
| 2024–2025 | Albania U19 | 13 | (0) |
| 2026– | Albania U21 | 1 | (0) |
| 2026– | Albania | 1 | (0) |
- * Club domestic league appearances and goals as of 22 November 2026 ‡ National team caps and goals as of 17 November 2026

Samuele Sina (born 14 February 2007) is a professional footballer who plays as a defender for Serie C club Union Brescia and the Albania national football team.

After starting his development at Inter Milan, Sina continued his youth career at Sporting Franciacorta and Feralpisalò. He joined Union Brescia in 2025 and spent the 2025–26 season on loan at Ospitaletto, making his professional debut in Serie C.

Born in Italy, he represented Albania U17 and Albania U19 before making his senior debut in September 2026.

== Club career ==
=== Early career ===
Born in Iseo, Lombardy, Sina grew up in Palazzolo sull'Oglio and comes from an Albanian family. He began playing football at a young age and joined Inter Milan's youth academy in 2019. In April that year, he was part of the club's Under-12 side that finished runners-up at the Ibercup in Brazil, scoring in a group-stage match against Cruzeiro. He spent three years in the club's youth system, developing as a centre-back before leaving in 2022.

In 2022, Sina moved to Sporting Franciacorta, where he spent one season before joining Feralpisalò in 2023. He continued his development with the club's Under-17 and Primavera teams, progressing to the latter's first team during the 2024–25 season. In May 2024, he was named among the substitutes for Feralpisalò's final Serie B match against Ternana, although he did not make an appearance.

=== Brescia ===
Following the dissolution of Feralpisalò and the formation of Union Brescia in 2025, Sina became part of the newly established club. On 8 August 2025, he joined fellow Serie C side Ospitaletto on loan until 30 June 2026.

Sina made his professional debut on 12 September 2025, starting in a 2–1 home defeat against Pergolettese. During the 2025–26 season, he made 25 appearances across the league and Coppa Italia Serie C, gaining his first experience of senior football.

After returning to Union Brescia in 2026, Sina made his debut for the club on 21 August, scoring in a 3–1 victory over Carpi. Under manager Eugenio Corini, he established himself as a first-team regular and scored again in the following league match, a 1–0 win against Pergolettese on 30 August. His performances earned him his first call-up to the senior Albania national team in September 2026.

== International career ==
Sina was initially called up by Albania under-15 for a youth training camp in November 2019, and went on to represent Albania U17, Albania U19 and Albania U21 between 2023 and 2026, making appearances across friendly matches and European Championship qualifying competitions.

On 19 September 2026, Rolando Maran called Sina up to the senior team for the 2026–27 UEFA Nations League. He made his senior debut on 29 September, starting in a 3–0 away win over San Marino and playing the full 90 minutes.

== Career statistics ==
=== Club ===
As of match played 22 November 2026

Appearances and goals by club, season and competition
| Club | Season | League | | | Cup | | Europe | | Other | | Total | |
| Club | Season | Division | Apps | Goals | Apps | Goals | Apps | Goals | Apps | Goals | Apps | Goals |
|---|---|---|---|---|---|---|---|---|---|---|---|---|
| Feralpisalò | 2023–24 | Serie B | 0 | 0 | — | | — | | — | | 0 | 0 |
| Feralpisalò | 2024–25 | Serie C | 0 | 0 | 0 | 0 | — | | — | | 0 | 0 |
| Feralpisalò | Total | | 0 | 0 | 0 | 0 | — | | — | | 0 | 0 |
| Ospitaletto | 2025–26 | Serie C | 23 | 0 | 2 | 0 | — | | — | | 25 | 0 |
| Union Brescia | 2026–27 | Serie C | 12 | 2 | 2 | 0 | — | | — | | 14 | 2 |
| Career total | | | 35 | 2 | 4 | 0 | 0 | 0 | 0 | 0 | 39 | 2 |

=== International ===
As of match played 26 September 2026

Appearances and goals by national team and year
| National team | Year | Apps | Goals |
|---|---|---|---|
| Albania | 2026 | 1 | 0 |
| Total | | 1 | 0 |
