= Christian Mora =

Italian footballer (born 1997)

Personal information
- Date of birth: 31 December 1997 (age 28)
- Place of birth: Treviglio, Italy
- Height: 1.84 m (6 ft 0 in)
- Position: Defender

Team information
- Current team: Giana Erminio
- Number: 19

Youth career
- –2016: Atalanta

Senior career*
Years	Team	Apps	(Gls)
2016–2025	Atalanta	0	(0)
2016–2017	→ Renate (loan)	21	(0)
2017–2018	→ Piacenza (loan)	22	(1)
2018–2019	→ Pro Patria (loan)	34	(1)
2019–2020	→ Cittadella (loan)	18	(0)
2020–2021	→ Alessandria (loan)	18	(2)
2021–2023	→ Siena (loan)	36	(0)
2023–2024	→ Atalanta U23 (loan)	2	(0)
2024	→ Renate (loan)	1	(0)
2025	Union Clodiense Chioggia	5	(0)
2025–2026	Pro Patria	25	(0)
2026–	Giana Erminio	0	(0)
- * Club domestic league appearances and goals as of 30 April 2026

Christian Mora (born 31 December 1997) is an Italian footballer who plays as a defender for Serie C Group A club Giana Erminio.

== Club career ==
=== Atalanta ===
==== Loan to Renate ====
On 13 July 2016, Mora was signed by Serie C side Renate on a season-long loan deal. Two weeks later he made his professional debut in Serie C for Renate in a 2–1 home win over Olbia, he was replaced by Alberto Schettino in the 69th minute. On 2 October he played his first entire match for Renate, a 2–0 home win over Prato. Mora ended his season-long loan to Renate with 21 appearances, 11 as a starter and 3 assist, however he played only 2 entire match for the team.

==== Loan to Piacenza ====
On 14 July 2017, Mora was loaned to Serie C club Piacenza on a season-long loan deal. On 30 July he made his debut for Piacenza in a 1–0 home win over Massese in the first round of Coppa Italia, he was replaced by Robero Masullo in the 60th minute. On 27 August he made his Serie C debut for Piacenza as a substitute replacing Edoardo Masciangelo in the 62nd minute of a 2–0 away defeat against Monza. On 1 October, Mora scored his first professional goal, as a substitute, in the 77th minute of a 1–0 away win over Lucchese. On 4 December he played his first entire match for Piacenza, a 3–0 home win over Gavorrano. Mora ended his loan with 25 appearances, 13 as a starter, 1 goal and 2 assists.

==== Loan to Pro Patria ====
On 1 July 2018, Mora was signed by newly Serie C promoted team Aurora Pro Patria on a season-long loan deal for the 2018–19 season. On 16 September he made his debut in Serie C for Pro Patria in a 2–1 home win over Pistoiese, he played the entire match. On 23 December he scored his first goal for Aurora Pro Patria in the 48th minute of a 2–0 away win over Pisa. Mora ended his season-long loan to Aurora Pro Patria with 35 appearances, 1 goal and 4 assists, he also helps the club to reach the play-off, however they lost 2–0 against Carrarese in the first round .

==== Loan to Cittadella ====
After 3 years of loans in Serie C, on 5 July 2019, Mora was loaned to Serie B club Cittadella on a season-long loan deal. On 11 August he made his debut for Cittadella in a 3–0 home win over Padova in the second round of Coppa Italia, he was replaced by Alberto Rizzo after 74 minutes. Twenty days later, on 31 August, he made his Serie B debut for the club in a 4–1 away defeat against Benevento, he played the entire match.

==== Loan to Alessandria ====
On 24 September 2020, he joined Serie C club Alessandria on a two-year loan with an option to purchase.

==== Loan to Siena ====
After he appeared in one 2021–22 Serie B game for Alessandria, his loan there was terminated and on 25 August 2021 he moved on a two-year loan to Siena.

== Career statistics ==
=== Club ===
As of 3 April 2022

Club	Season	League			Cup		Europe		Other		Total	
Club	Season	League	Apps	Goals	Apps	Goals	Apps	Goals	Apps	Goals	Apps	Goals
Renate (loan)	2016–17	Serie C	21	0	0	0	—		—		21	0
Piacenza (loan)	2017–18	Serie C	22	1	3	0	—		—		25	1
Pro Patria (loan)	2018–19	Serie C	34	1	0	0	—		2 (Note: All appearance(s) in Serie C play-off.)	0	36	1
Cittadella (loan)	2019–20	Serie B	18	0	2	0	—		—		20	0
Alessandria (loan)	2020–21	Serie B	19	2	1	0	—		—		20	2
Alessandria (loan)	2021–22	Serie C	1	0	1	0	—		—		2	0
Alessandria (loan)	Total		20	2	2	0	—		—		22	2
Siena (loan)	2021–22	Serie C	32	0	0	0	—		—		32	0
Career total			147	4	7	0	—		2	0	156	4
