= Luigi Samele =

Luigi Samele may refer to:

- Luigi Samele (fencer) (born 1987), Italian fencer
- Luigi Samele (footballer) (born 2002), Italian footballer
