= Alberto De Francesco =

Italian footballer (born 1994)

Personal information
- Date of birth: 12 October 1994 (age 32)
- Place of birth: Rome, Italy
- Height: 1.82 m (6 ft 0 in)
- Position: Midfielder

Team information
- Current team: Desenzano
- Number: 15

Youth career
- –2011: Tor di Quinto
- 2011–2013: Lazio

Senior career*
Years	Team	Apps	(Gls)
2013–2014	Lazio	0	(0)
2013–2014	→ Ischia (loan)	24	(1)
2014–2016	L'Aquila	54	(0)
2016–2018	Reggina	57	(5)
2018–2019	Spezia	18	(2)
2019–2020	Reggina	15	(1)
2020–2022	Avellino	50	(3)
2022–2023	Mantova	30	(5)
2023–2025	Sorrento	55	(11)
2025	Feralpisalò	15	(0)
2025–2026	Union Brescia	21	(1)
2026–	Desenzano	1	(0)
- * Club domestic league appearances and goals as of 23 August 2026

Alberto De Francesco (born 12 October 1994) is an Italian professional footballer who plays as a midfielder for Serie C Group A club Desenzano.

== Club career ==
He made his Serie C debut for L'Aquila on 30 August 2014 in a game against Gubbio.

On 16 August 2019, he returned to Reggina on a two-year contract.

On 17 September 2020 he became a new Avellino player.

On 13 July 2022, De Francesco moved to Mantova.

On 11 January 2025, he joined Feralpisalò.
