= Claudio Santini =

Italian footballer (born 1992)

Personal information
- Date of birth: 12 February 1992 (age 34)
- Place of birth: Bagno a Ripoli, Italy
- Height: 1.78 m (5 ft 10 in)
- Position: Forward

Team information
- Current team: Desenzano
- Number: 9

Youth career
- –2010: Fiorentina

Senior career*
Years	Team	Apps	(Gls)
2010–2013	Borgo a Buggiano	77	(8)
2013–2015	Empoli	0	(0)
2013–2014	→ Gavorrano (loan)	27	(2)
2014–2015	→ Lucchese (loan)	10	(0)
2015	Prato	11	(0)
2015–2016	Valdinievole Montecatini	31	(21)
2016–2017	Pontedera	35	(13)
2017–2019	Ascoli	6	(1)
2018	→ Robur Siena (loan)	20	(6)
2018–2019	→ Alessandria (loan)	32	(8)
2019–2022	Padova	75	(12)
2022–2023	Rimini	32	(16)
2023–2025	Virtus Entella	46	(5)
2025	Feralpisalò	12	(2)
2025–2026	Union Brescia	0	(0)
2025–2026	→ Sorrento (loan)	16	(0)
2026–	Desenzano	1	(0)
- * Club domestic league appearances and goals as of 23 August 2026

Claudio Santini (born 12 February 1992) is an Italian professional footballer who plays as a forward for Serie C Group A club Desenzano.

== Club career ==
He made his Serie C debut for Lucchese on 30 August 2014 in a game against Santarcangelo.

On 5 July 2019, he signed a 2-year contract with Serie C club Padova.

On 19 July 2022, Santini joined Rimini on a two-year contract.

On 10 August 2023, Santini moved to Virtus Entella.
