= Gioele Zacchi =

Italian footballer (born 2005)

Personal information
- Date of birth: 10 July 2003 (age 23)
- Place of birth: Modena, Italy
- Height: 1.85 m (6 ft 1 in)
- Position: Goalkeeper

Team information
- Current team: Union Brescia (on loan from Sassuolo)
- Number: 43

Youth career
- 2009–2014: Valsa Gold
- 2014–2022: Sassuolo

Senior career*
Years	Team	Apps	(Gls)
2022–	Sassuolo	1	(0)
2023–2024	→ Giana Erminio (loan)	34	(0)
2024–2025	→ Latina (loan)	30	(0)
2026–	→ Union Brescia (loan)	1	(0)

International career^{‡}
2019	Italy U16	2	(0)
2019–2020	Italy U17	7	(0)
2021–2022	Italy U19	6	(0)
2022–2023	Italy U20	3	(0)
2024–2025	Italy U21	7	(0)
Medal record
Men's football
Representing Italy
FIFA U-20 World Cup
Runner-up	2023 Argentina
- * Club domestic league appearances and goals as of 21 August 2026 ‡ National team caps and goals as of 14:41, 16 March 2026 (UTC)

Gioele Zacchi (born 10 July 2003) is an Italian professional footballer who plays as a goalkeeper for Serie C Group A club Union Brescia, on loan from Sassuolo.

== Club career ==
A youth product of Valsa Gold, Zacchi joined the academy of Sassuolo in 2014, and signed his first professional contract with the club on 29 September 2022 until 2025. On 19 July 2023, he joined Giana Erminio on a season-long loan in Serie C. On 12 July 2024, he joined Latina on season-long loan, again in Serie C. On 4 December 2025, he extended his contract with Sassuolo until 2029.

== International career ==
Zacchi was called up to the Italy U19s for the 2022 UEFA European Under-19 Championship. He was then called up to the Italy U20s for the 2023 FIFA U-20 World Cup and 2024 Maurice Revello Tournament. He was called up to the Italy U21s for the 2025 UEFA European Under-21 Championship.

== Career statistics ==
As of match played 16 March 2026

Appearances and goals by club, season and competition
Club	Season	League			National cup		Continental		Other		Total	
Club	Season	Division	Apps	Goals	Apps	Goals	Apps	Goals	Apps	Goals	Apps	Goals
Sassuolo	2021–22	Serie A	0	0	0	0	—		—		0	0
Sassuolo	2022–23	Serie A	0	0	0	0	—		—		0	0
Sassuolo	2025–26	Serie A	0	0	0	0	—		—		0	0
Sassuolo	Total		0	0	0	0	—		—		0	0
Giana Erminio (loan)	2023–24	Serie C	34	0	—		—		2	0	36	0
Latina (loan)	2024–25	Serie C	30	0	—		—		1	0	31	0
Career total			64	0	0	0	0	0	3	0	67	0

== Honours ==
Italy U20

- FIFA U-20 World Cup runner-up: 2023
