= Hergheligiu =

Hergheligiu is a surname. Notable people with the surname include:

- Andrei Hergheligiu (born 1992), Romanian footballer
- Denis Hergheligiu (born 1999), Italian-Romanian footballer
