= Lorenzo Milani (footballer) =

Italian association football player (born 2001)

Personal information
- Date of birth: 21 May 2001 (age 25)
- Place of birth: Livorno, Italy
- Height: 1.78 m (5 ft 10 in)
- Position: Defender

Team information
- Current team: Desenzano
- Number: 2

Youth career
- Empoli
- US Grosseto 1912

Senior career*
Years	Team	Apps	(Gls)
2020–2022	Pontedera	69	(6)
2022–2024	Pescara	68	(5)
2024–2026	Heracles Almelo	7	(0)
2026	→ Bra (loan)	9	(1)
2026–	Desenzano	1	(0)
- * Club domestic league appearances and goals as of 23 August 2026

Lorenzo Milani (born 22 May 2001) is an Italian footballer who plays as a defender for Serie C Group A club Desenzano.

== Career ==
He is from Livorno and played in the youth system at Empoli and US Grosseto 1912. He played for Pontedera in his native Tuscany. He joined Pescara of Serie C in July 2022.

In June 2024, he signed for Eredivisie side Heracles Almelo on a four-year contract taking him up to 2028, with the option of an extra season. He made his league debut for Heracles Almelo on the 11 August 2024 against Sparta Rotterdam.

On 30 January 2026, Milani returned to Italy and joined Bra of Serie C on loan.
