= Atalanta BC Under-23 =

Reserve team of Atalanta BC

La Dea (The Goddess)
- Full name: Atalanta Bergamasca Calcio Under-23
- Nickname: La Dea (The Goddess)
- Founded: 4 August 2023; 3 years ago
- Ground: Stadio Comunale, Caravaggio, Italy
- Capacity: 2,180
- Manager: Nicola Beati
- League: Serie C Group C
- 2025–26: Serie C Group C, 11th of 20
- Website: www.atalanta.it
Home colours	Away colours	Third colours

Atalanta Bergamasca Calcio Under-23, or simply Atalanta U23, is a professional football team based in Bergamo, Lombardy, Italy, which acts as the reserve team of Serie A club Atalanta. Founded on 4 August 2023, the team competes in Serie C Group A and the Coppa Italia Serie C.

== History ==
Historically, Atalanta has been known for its youth academy, both in Italy and across Europe. The Atalanta side that won the 1962–63 Coppa Italia was predominantly composed of players trained in the club's youth ranks such as Angelo Domenghini and Piero Gardoni. Additionally, many players who began their professional careers at Atalanta went on to play in Europe's most successful clubs, such as Gaetano Scirea (who would also win the 1982 FIFA World Cup with Italy).

Following Italy's failure to qualify for the 2018 FIFA World Cup, the Italian Football Federation implemented several reforms, among them the reintroduction of reserve teams, which already existed in other countries such as Spain, Germany, Portugal, and England. They play in the same league system as first teams, subject to special regulations such as being restricted to a lower division than that of their corresponding first team. Juventus was the first Italian club to establish a reserve team; Juventus Next Gen (then known as Juventus U23) was admitted to the 2018–19 Serie C on 3 August 2018. Several other clubs expressed interest in establishing a reserve team during the following years. However, prior to 2023, none materialized, and reserve teams drew criticism from fans of Serie B and Serie C clubs; FIGC president Gabriele Gravina nonetheless defended the project.

In spring 2023, Atalanta announced its intention to establish a reserve team, to provide continuity for players continuing beyond the Primavera (under 19) team. Atalanta filed for admission of its second team on 14 July 2023; on 4 August 2023, Atalanta Under-23 was officially admitted to Serie C for the 2023–24 season, becoming the second Italian club to have a reserve team. The club's admission to Serie C was confirmed following the exclusion of Siena due to financial irregularities.

Atalanta Under-23 competes in Serie C Group A. The team played its first match on 3 September 2023, a 2–3 home loss against Virtus Verona. On 15 September, Atalanta Under-23 gained their first ever victory, a 3–2 home win over Giana Erminio.

== Stadium ==
The club plays its home matches at the Stadio Comunale in Caravaggio, a comune in the Province of Bergamo. However, the first few matches of the 2023–24 season were instead played at the Stadio Comunale in Gorgonzola, while the stadium in Caravaggio underwent renovations.

== Players ==
As of 1 September 2026

Note: Flags indicate national team as defined under FIFA eligibility rules; some limited exceptions apply. Players may hold more than one non-FIFA nationality.

No.	Pos.	Nation	Player
1	GK	POL	Piotr Pardel
3	DF	ITA	Federico Simonetto
5	DF	ITA	Matteo Plaia
7	MF	ITA	Alberto Manzoni
8	MF	CGO	Digne Kaelas Pounga
9	FW	ITA	Giulio Misitano
10	MF	ITA	Andrea Bonanomi
12	GK	ITA	Tommaso Bertini
13	GK	ROU	Gabriel Bugli
14	DF	ITA	Jacopo Mirra
16	MF	ESP	Gerard Ruiz
18	DF	ITA	Alessio Guerini
19	DF	SLO	Relja Obrić
22	GK	ITA	Alessandro Anelli
23	DF	ITA	Isaac Isoa
24	MF	ITA	Davide Ghislandi

No.	Pos.	Nation	Player
25	MF	ITA	Federico Steffanoni
28	FW	ITA	Gabriele Bertolini
29	FW	ESP	Siren Diao
31	MF	ITA	Marco Leandri
37	DF	ESP	Albert Navarro
43	DF	CRO	Ljubo Puljić
45	FW	GUI	Henry Camara
47	MF	CRO	Sergej Levak
61	MF	ITA	Javison Idele
66	DF	ITA	Federico Bergonzi
77	DF	ITA	Alessandro Rinaldi
79	MF	ITA	Mattia Pedretti
80	FW	ITA	Tommaso De Nipoti
90	FW	ITA	Emanuele Zanaboni
91	MF	ITA	Filippo Mencaraglia

=== Out on loan ===
As of 1 September 2026

Note: Flags indicate national team as defined under FIFA eligibility rules; some limited exceptions apply. Players may hold more than one non-FIFA nationality.

No.	Pos.	Nation	Player
—	GK	ITA	Filippo Cecchini (at Tritium until 30 June 2027)
—	DF	ITA	Pietro Comi (at Lecco until 30 June 2027)
—	DF	ITA	Pietro Asiatico (at Cavese until 30 June 2027)
—	DF	ITA	Giorgio Cittadini (at Frosinone until 30 June 2027)
—	DF	ITA	Pietro Tornaghi (at Giana Erminio until 30 June 2027)
—	DF	ITA	Pietro Parmiggiani (at Ospitaletto until 30 June 2027)

No.	Pos.	Nation	Player
—	MF	ITA	Andrea Oliveri (at Ascoli until 30 June 2027)
—	MF	ALB	Endri Muhameti (at Giana Erminio until 30 June 2027)
—	FW	SRB	Vanja Vlahović (at Mantova until 30 June 2027)
—	FW	ITA	Dominic Vavassori (at Palermo until 30 June 2027)
—	FW	GUI	Moustapha Cissé (at Carrarese until 30 June 2027)

== Coaching staff ==
As of 13 July 2026

Position	Staff
Manager	(Italy) Nicola Beati
Assistant manager	(Italy) Luca Cacioli
Technical coach	(Italy) Diego Daldosso
Goalkeeping coach	(Italy) Francesco Benussi
Fitness trainers	(Italy) Daniele Maggioni
Fitness trainers	(Italy) Federico Scaia
Match analysts	(Italy) Federico Santi
Match analysts	(Italy) Matteo Limonta

== See also ==
- Italian reserve football teams
