= Andrea Cisco =

Italian footballer (born 1998)

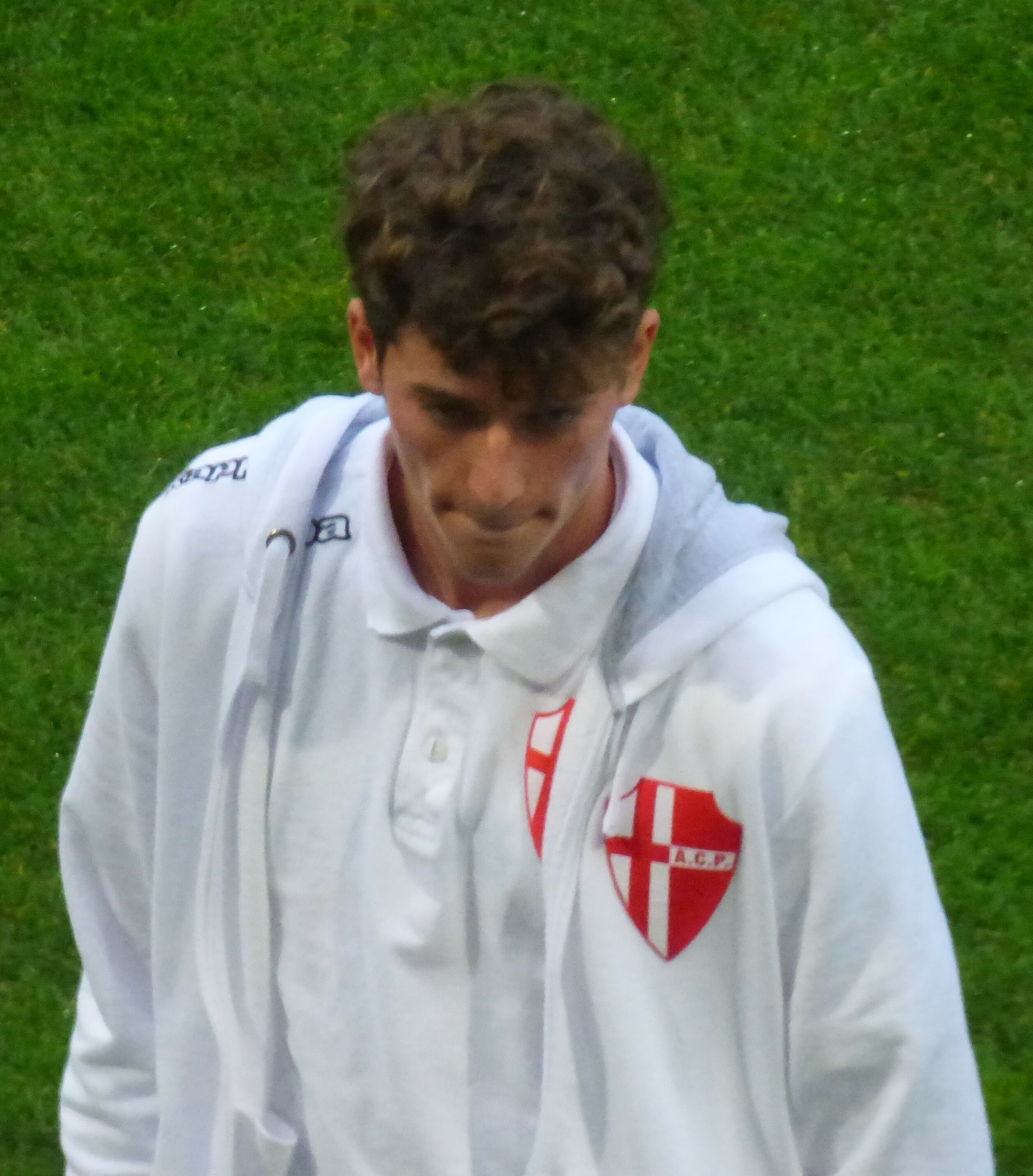
- Cisco in 2018

Personal information
- Date of birth: 8 October 1998 (age 28)
- Place of birth: Padua, Italy
- Height: 1.83 m (6 ft 0 in)
- Position: Winger

Team information
- Current team: Perugia (on loan from Union Brescia)
- Number: 7

Youth career
- –2017: Padova

Senior career*
Years	Team	Apps	(Gls)
2016–2018	Padova	13	(2)
2018–2021	Sassuolo	0	(0)
2018–2019	→ Padova (loan)	12	(1)
2019	→ Albissola (loan)	17	(2)
2019–2020	→ Pescara (loan)	2	(0)
2020–2021	→ Novara (loan)	33	(1)
2021–2023	Pisa	2	(0)
2022	→ Teramo (loan)	9	(0)
2022–2023	→ Virtus Francavilla (loan)	36	(1)
2023–2025	Südtirol	18	(0)
2024–2025	→ Perugia (loan)	23	(5)
2025–	Union Brescia	33	(3)
2026–	→ Perugia (loan)	0	(0)
- * Club domestic league appearances and goals as of 23 August 2026

Andrea Cisco (born 8 October 1998) is an Italian professional footballer who plays as a winger for Serie C Group B club Perugia on loan from Union Brescia.

== Career ==
Cisco made his Serie C debut for Padova on 10 April 2017 in a game against Venezia.

On 31 January 2018, he was signed by the Serie A club Sassuolo, who loaned him back to Padova until the end of the 2017–18 season. At the end of the season the loan has been extended.

On 9 January 2019, he was loaned by Sassuolo to Albissola in Serie C until the end of the season.

On 28 June 2019, Cisco joined Pescara on loan until 30 June 2021 with Pescara holding an obligation to buy his rights at the end of the loan.

On 21 January 2020, he moved on loan to Serie C club Novara for a 1.5-year term with an option to purchase.

On 11 August 2021, he joined Pisa permanently.

On 29 January 2022, he went to Teramo on loan.

On 26 August 2022, Cisco moved on loan to Virtus Francavilla.

On 7 July 2023, he signed a 3-years deal for Südtirol. On 29 August 2024, Cisco was loaned to Perugia, with an option to buy.
