= Marco Moscati =

Italian footballer

Personal information
- Date of birth: 1 November 1992 (age 34)
- Place of birth: Livorno, Italy
- Height: 1.78 m (5 ft 10 in)
- Position: Midfielder

Team information
- Current team: Desenzano
- Number: 7

Youth career
- –2011: Livorno

Senior career*
Years	Team	Apps	(Gls)
2011–2018	Livorno	69	(2)
2011–2013	→ Perugia (loan)	65	(8)
2013–2014	→ Perugia (loan)	33	(5)
2016–2017	→ Entella (loan)	38	(1)
2017–2018	→ Novara (loan)	39	(6)
2018–2021	Perugia	44	(2)
2019–2020	→ Trapani (loan)	19	(2)
2021–2023	Südtirol	20	(0)
2023–2026	Lumezzane	107	(3)
2026–	Desenzano	5	(0)
- * Club domestic league appearances and goals as of 26 September 2026

Marco Moscati (born 1 November 1992) is an Italian footballer who plays as a midfielder for Serie C Group A club Desenzano.

== Club career ==
He made his professional debut in the Serie B for Livorno on 29 May 2011 in a game against Frosinone.

=== Perugia ===
==== Loan to Trapani ====
On 2 September 2019, he joined Trapani on loan.

=== Südtirol ===
On 3 August 2021, he joined Südtirol as a free agent.

=== Lumezzane ===
On 28 July 2023, Moscati agreed to move to Lumezzane on a two-year contract.
