= Piotr Pardel =

Polish footballer (born 2005)

Personal information
- Full name: Piotr Michał Pardel
- Date of birth: 31 January 2005 (age 21)
- Place of birth: Poland
- Position: Goalkeeper

Team information
- Current team: Atalanta U23
- Number: 1

Youth career
- Czarni Marianowo
- –2022: FASE Szczecin
- 2022–: Atalanta

Senior career*
Years	Team	Apps	(Gls)
2023–	Atalanta U23	21	(0)
- * Club domestic league appearances and goals as of 20:00, 1 June 2026 (UTC)

Piotr Michał Pardel (born 31 January 2005) is a Polish professional footballer who plays as a goalkeeper for Serie C Group C club Atalanta U23.

== Early life ==
Pardel was born on 31 January 2005. Born in Poland, he is a native of Marianowo, Poland.

== Career ==
As a youth player, Pardel joined Polish side FASE Szczecin at the age of nine. Following his stint there, he joined the youth academy of Serie A side Atalanta during January 2022 and was promoted to the club's reserve team ahead of the 2023–24 season.
