= Daniele Pinto =

Italian footballer (born 1986)

Personal information
- Date of birth: 9 May 1986 (age 40)
- Place of birth: Vimercate, Italy
- Height: 1.70 m (5 ft 7 in)
- Position: Midfielder

Team information
- Current team: Giana Erminio
- Number: 7

Youth career
- Dipo Vimercate
- Carugate
- Usmate

Senior career*
Years	Team	Apps	(Gls)
–2009	Usmate	?	(0)
2009–2011	Vimercatese Oreno	?	(16)
2011–2013	Giana Erminio	?	(25)
2014–	Giana Erminio	321	(14)
- * Club domestic league appearances and goals as of 30 April 2026

Daniele Pinto (born 9 May 1986) is an Italian professional footballer who plays as a midfielder for Serie C Group A club Giana Erminio.

== Club career ==
Pinto started his career on Italian Eccellenza, and in the 2011–12 season signed for Promozione club Giana Erminio. He won the promotion in his first season, and after that the promotion to Serie D in the 2012-13 Eccellenza season. Pinto didn't play in Serie D, and left football for the 2013–14 season to accept a job as director of a store in Inzago, Milan.

He returned to the recently promoted Giana Erminio in the 2014–15 Lega Pro, current Serie C, and he's the captain of the club since 2018.
