= Albert Navarro =

Spanish footballer (born 2007

Personal information
- Full name: Albert Navarro Escriche
- Date of birth: 24 May 2007 (age 19)
- Place of birth: Barcelona, Spain
- Height: 1.88 m (6 ft 2 in)
- Positions: Centre-back; left-back

Team information
- Current team: Atalanta U23
- Number: 37

Youth career
- –2015: Damm
- 2015–2024: Barcelona

Senior career*
Years	Team	Apps	(Gls)
2024–	Atalanta U23	57	(3)
2026–	Atalanta	0	(0)

International career^{‡}
2021–2022	Spain U15	7	(0)
2022–2023	Spain U16	7	(1)
2023–2024	Spain U17	11	(0)
2024–	Spain U18	3	(0)
- * Club domestic league appearances and goals as of 1 May 2026 ‡ National team caps and goals as of 15 October 2024

Albert Navarro Escriche (born 24 May 2007) is a Spanish professional footballer who plays for Serie C Group C club Atalanta U23. Mainly a centre-back, he can also play as a left-back.

== Early life ==
Navarro was born in Barcelona, Catalonia. Growing up, he was friends with Spain international Pau Cubarsí and regarded Spain international Jordi Alba as his football idol.

== Club career ==
As a youth player, Navarro joined the youth academy of Spanish side Damm. In 2015, he joined the youth academy of La Liga side Barcelona, where he played in the UEFA Youth League and was promoted to the club's reserve team in 2023, where he made zero league appearances and scored zero goals. Ahead of the 2024–25 season, he signed for the reserve team of Serie A side Atalanta.

== International career ==
Navarro is a Spain youth international. During the summer of 2024, he played for the Spain national under-17 football team at the 2024 UEFA European Under-17 Championship.

== Style of play ==
Navarro plays as a defender and is left-footed. Spanish newspaper Sport wrote in 2024 that he "stands out for his power, effective marking in defensive duties, and his fantastic left-footed shot".
