= Marco Nichetti =

Italian footballer

Personal information
- Full name: Marco Emilio Nichetti
- Date of birth: 22 December 1996 (age 29)
- Place of birth: Lodi, Italy
- Height: 1.88 m (6 ft 2 in)
- Position: Midfielder

Team information
- Current team: Novara
- Number: 6

Youth career
- Casaletto Ceredano
- Pergolettese
- –2014: AlbinoLeffe

Senior career*
Years	Team	Apps	(Gls)
2014–2022	AlbinoLeffe	170	(2)
2022–2024	Alessandria	67	(1)
2024–2025	Giana Erminio	26	(1)
2025–2026	Virtus Entella	26	(0)
2026–	Novara	0	(0)
- * Club domestic league appearances and goals as of 22 August 2026

Marco Emilio Nichetti (born 22 December 1996) is an Italian footballer who plays as a midfielder for Serie C Group A club Novara.

== Career ==
=== AlbinoLeffe ===
A graduate of the club's youth academy, Nichetti made his league debut on 28 September 2014, coming on as a late substitute for Mattia Corradi in a 1-0 home victory over Monza.

=== Alessandria ===
On 24 August 2022, Nichetti signed a two-year contract with Alessandria.

=== Virtus Entella ===
On 8 July 2025, Nichetti moved to Virtus Entella in Serie B.
