= Stefano Minelli =

Italian footballer

Personal information
- Date of birth: 5 March 1994 (age 32)
- Place of birth: Brescia, Italy
- Height: 1.84 m (6 ft 0 in)
- Position: Goalkeeper

Team information
- Current team: Desenzano
- Number: 1

Youth career
- –2014: Brescia

Senior career*
| Years | Team | Apps | (Gls) |
| 2014–2019 | Brescia | 129 | (0) |
| 2019–2020 | Padova | 44 | (0) |
| 2020–2021 | SPAL | 0 | (0) |
| 2021 | Perugia | 8 | (0) |
| 2021–2022 | Frosinone | 11 | (0) |
| 2022–2023 | Cesena | 0 | (0) |
| 2023 | → Südtirol (loan) | 0 | (0) |
| 2023–2024 | Feralpisalò | 0 | (0) |
| 2024–2025 | Novara | 54 | (0) |
| 2025–2026 | Venezia | 0 | (0) |
| 2026– | Desenzano | 1 | (0) |
- * Club domestic league appearances and goals as of 23 August 2026

Stefano Minelli (born 5 March 1994) is an Italian footballer who plays as a goalkeeper for Serie C Group A club Desenzano.

== Club career ==
Minelli was a youth player with Brescia Calcio. He made his debut on 25 May 2014 against Juve Stabia in a Serie B game. He played the full game in a 4-1 home win.

On 4 September 2019, he joined Padova.

On 11 December 2020, he signed as a free-agent with SPAL.

On 30 January 2021, he moved to Perugia.

On 10 September 2021, he joined Frosinone on a one-year contract.

On 14 July 2022, Minelli signed a two-year deal with Cesena. On 13 January 2023, he moved on loan to Südtirol until the end of the season.

On 16 July 2023, Minelli moved on a two-year deal to Feralpisalò.

On 23 January 2024, Minelli signed a contract with Novara until 30 June 2025.

On 6 November 2025, Minelli joined Venezia in Serie B until the end of the 2025–26 season.
