= Calcio Desenzano SSD =

Italian football club

Desenzano
- Full name: Desenzano Football Club
- Founded: 1946 (as Calvina); 2020 (as Desenzano Calvina, then Calcio Desenzano Società Sportiva Dilettantistica)
- Stadium: Stadio Tre Stelle-Francesco Ghizzi
- Capacity: 1,100
- President: Roberto Marai
- Head coach: Marco Gaburro
- League: Serie C Group A
- 2025–26: Serie D Group D, 1st of 18 (promoted)
| Home colours | Away colours |

Desenzano Football Club, known simply as Desenzano is an Italian association football club, based in Desenzano del Garda, which currently plays in Serie C Group A.

== History ==
The club was founded in 1946 as Calvina, playing at the amateur level in the minor leagues for the entirety of its history before reaching a place in the Serie D in 2018. In 2019, the club was acquired by entrepreneur Roberto Marai who, just a year later, agreed upon a merger with minor club Sporting Desenzano. The new club, named Desenzano Calvina from 2020 to 2022 and, since 2022, just Desenzano, played consistently in the Serie D league, always in the higher spots of the league table, ending in third place by the end of the 2024–25 Serie D season.

In the 2025–26 Serie D season, Desenzano emerged as strong promotion candidates, despite the presence of former Serie A clubs such as Pistoiese and Piacenza in the same league group.

== Current squad ==
As of 2 September 2026

Note: Flags indicate national team as defined under FIFA eligibility rules; some limited exceptions apply. Players may hold more than one non-FIFA nationality.

| No. | Pos. | Nation | Player |
|---|---|---|---|
| 1 | GK | ITA | Stefano Minelli |
| 2 | DF | ITA | Lorenzo Milani |
| 3 | DF | ITA | Lorenzo Giorgi |
| 4 | MF | ITA | Francesco Antonelli |
| 6 | DF | ITA | Tommaso Panelli |
| 7 | MF | ITA | Marco Moscati |
| 8 | MF | ITA | Stefano Tomaselli |
| 9 | FW | ITA | Claudio Santini |
| 10 | FW | ITA | Vincenzo Millico |
| 11 | FW | ITA | Nicolas Boiga |
| 12 | GK | ITA | Filippo Bastianoni |
| 15 | MF | ITA | Alberto De Francesco |
| 17 | FW | ITA | Saverio D'Onofrio (on loan from Avellino) |
| 19 | DF | ITA | Alessandro Pilati (on loan from Union Brescia) |

| No. | Pos. | Nation | Player |
|---|---|---|---|
| 20 | DF | ITA | Denis Andreis |
| 21 | MF | ITA | Edoardo Bovolon |
| 22 | GK | ITA | Marco Cassin (on loan from Cremonese) |
| 23 | MF | ITA | Filippo Bono |
| 24 | FW | ITA | Kevin Biondi |
| 30 | FW | ITA | Andrea Procaccio |
| 34 | FW | ITA | Leonardo Ubaldi |
| 43 | MF | ITA | Luca Lupano |
| 49 | DF | ITA | Leon Baldi |
| 70 | DF | ITA | Mattia Parlato |
| 77 | MF | ITA | Filippo Liberati (on loan from Carrarese) |
| 93 | DF | ITA | Pietro Reggiori |
| 98 | GK | ITA | Alberto Rizzi |

=== Out on loan ===
Note: Flags indicate national team as defined under FIFA eligibility rules; some limited exceptions apply. Players may hold more than one non-FIFA nationality.

| No. | Pos. | Nation | Player |
|---|---|---|---|
| — | DF | ITA | Francesco Turelli (at Pavonese until 30 June 2027) |

== Colors and badge ==
The team's colors are blue and white.

== Stadium ==
Desenzano play their home games at the Stadio Tre Stelle in their hometown of Desenzano del Garda.
