= Marcello Possenti =

Italian footballer

Personal information
- Date of birth: 6 July 1992 (age 34)
- Place of birth: Bergamo, Italy
- Height: 1.90 m (6 ft 3 in)
- Position: Left-back

Team information
- Current team: Ospitaletto
- Number: 3

Youth career
- Atalanta

Senior career*
Years	Team	Apps	(Gls)
2010–2013	Atalanta	0	(0)
2011–2012	→ Tritium (loan)	30	(0)
2012–2013	→ Lumezzane (loan)	27	(0)
2013–2016	Reggiana	23	(0)
2014–2015	→ Pordenone (loan)	11	(0)
2015	→ Santarcangelo (loan)	12	(0)
2015–2016	→ Pro Patria (loan)	32	(0)
2016–2017	Reggina	27	(1)
2017–2018	Carrarese	32	(0)
2018–2019	Forlì	21	(0)
2019–2024	Renate	147	(11)
2024–2025	Grosseto	25	(1)
2025–	Ospitaletto	26	(0)

International career
2010	Italy U-19	1	(0)
- * Club domestic league appearances and goals as of 30 April 2026

Marcello Possenti (born 6 July 1992) is an Italian footballer who plays as a left-back for Serie C Group A club Ospitaletto.

== Club career ==
Possenti made his debut for Nerazzurri on 27 October 2010 in Coppa Italia, against Livorno, and he played the whole match.

In July 2011, he was loaned to Tritium, alongside Emanuele Suagher, Jurgen Pandiani and Christian Monacizzo.

He made his debut for Tritium on 7 August 2011, against Benevento.

On 5 July 2019, he signed with Renate.

== International ==
He represented Italy at the under-19 level, in a friendly against Romania.
