= Óscar Siafá =

Equatoguinean footballer (born 1997)

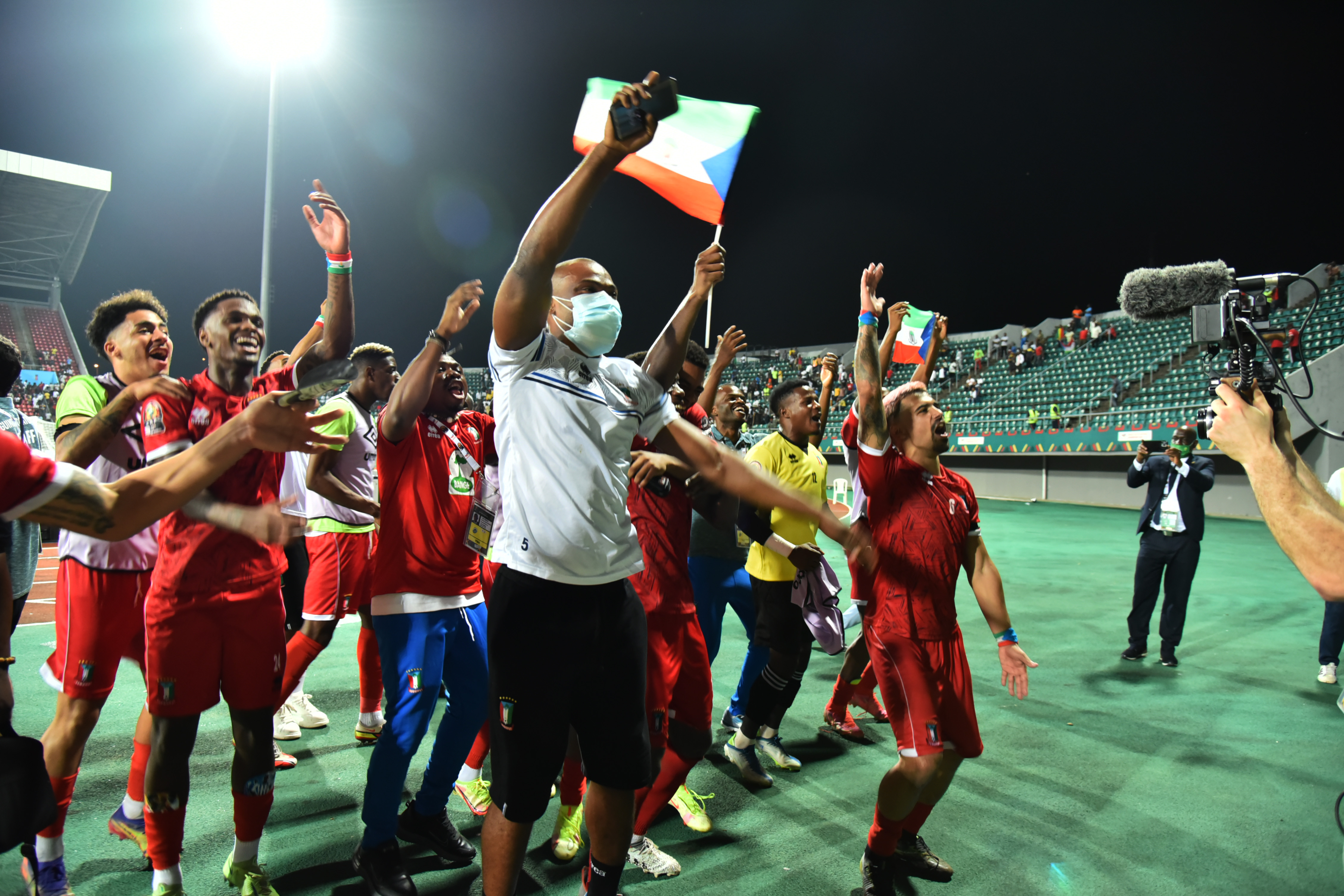
- Siafá with Equatorial Guinea in 2022

Personal information
- Full name: Juan José Óscar Siafá Etoha
- Date of birth: 12 September 1997 (age 29)
- Place of birth: Madrid, Spain
- Height: 1.91 m (6 ft 3 in)
- Position: Forward

Team information
- Current team: ASA Târgu Mureș
- Number: 7

Youth career
- –2015: Fuenlabrada
- 2015–2016: Móstoles URJC

Senior career*
Years	Team	Apps	(Gls)
2016–2018	Móstoles URJC B	28	(5)
2018	Elche B	12	(0)
2019	Eldense	18	(1)
2019	Cartagena	3	(0)
2019–2020	Cartagena B	15	(2)
2020	Alzira	9	(2)
2020–2021	Laredo	25	(4)
2021–2022	Olympiacos Volos	24	(7)
2022–2023	Niki Volos	21	(2)
2023–2024	Alessandria	24	(3)
2024	Birkirkara	11	(1)
2025	Pro Vercelli	11	(0)
2025–2026	CSM Slatina	27	(8)
2026–	ASA Târgu Mureș	12	(1)

International career^{‡}
2021–	Equatorial Guinea	17	(0)
- * Club domestic league appearances and goals as of 31 October 2026 ‡ National team caps and goals as of 25 March 2026

Juan José Óscar Siafá Etoha (born 12 September 1997) is a professional footballer who plays as a forward for Liga II club ASA Târgu Mureș. Born in Spain, he plays for the Equatorial Guinea national team.

== Early life ==
Siafá was born in Madrid to Equatoguinean Bubi parents.

== Club career ==
Siafá is a CF Fuenlabrada product. He has played for CD Móstoles URJC, Elche CF Ilicitano, CD Eldense, FC Cartagena, UD Alzira and CD Laredo in Spain.

On 12 October 2023, Siafá joined US Alessandria Calcio 1912 in Italy.

On 29 August 2024, Siafá joined Birkirkara F.C. in Malta. That same day, he made his Maltese Premier League debut for the club.

On 24 January 2025, Siafá moved to Pro Vercelli back in Italy.

On 4 July 2025, Siafá joined Slatina in Romania.

== International career ==
Siafá made his senior debut for Equatorial Guinea on 7 September 2021.

== Career statistics ==
=== International ===
As of 25 March 2026

Appearances and goals by national team and year
National team	Year	Apps	Goals
Equatorial Guinea	2021	5	0
Equatorial Guinea	2022	6	0
Equatorial Guinea	2023	2	0
Equatorial Guinea	2024	3	0
Equatorial Guinea	2025	0	0
Equatorial Guinea	2026	1	0
Total		17	0
