= Davide Guglielmotti =

Italian footballer (born 1994)

Personal information
- Date of birth: 24 March 1994 (age 32)
- Place of birth: Novara, Italy
- Height: 1.84 m (6 ft 0 in)
- Position: Winger

Team information
- Current team: Union Brescia
- Number: 44

Youth career
- Pro Vercelli
- Inter Milan

Senior career*
Years	Team	Apps	(Gls)
2013–2015	Pro Patria	35	(2)
2015–2016	Cremonese	19	(0)
2016–2017	Pistoiese	27	(0)
2018–2021	Renate	72	(10)
2021–2023	Reggiana	55	(7)
2023–2024	Lecco	22	(0)
2024–2025	Catania	20	(3)
2025–	Union Brescia	4	(0)
- * Club domestic league appearances and goals as of 21 October 2025

Davide Guglielmotti (born 24 March 1994) is an Italian professional footballer who plays as a winger for Serie C Group A club Union Brescia.

== Career ==
Born in Novara, Guglielmotti started his career in Pro Vercelli and Inter Milan youth sectors.

As a senior, in 2013 he signed with Serie C club Pro Patria. He made his professional debut on 26 January 2014 against AlbinoLeffe.

After two seasons in Pro Patria, on 2 July 2015 he moved to Cremonese.

He played one year for Cremonese, and on 27 July 2016 he joined to Pistoiese.

For the 2018–19 season, Guglielmotti signed with Renate. He played three seasons for Renate.

On 2 July 2021, he signed with Reggiana.

On 23 August 2023, Guglielmotti signed a two-year contract with Lecco.

On 29 August 2024, Guglielmotti moved to Catania on a three-year deal.
