= Alessandro Mastalli =

Italian footballer (born 1996)

Personal information
- Date of birth: 7 February 1996 (age 30)
- Place of birth: Bologna, Italy
- Height: 1.75 m (5 ft 9 in)
- Position: Midfielder

Team information
- Current team: Siena
- Number: 24

Youth career
- AC Milan

Senior career*
Years	Team	Apps	(Gls)
2014–2015	AC Milan	1	(0)
2015–2016	→ Lugano (loan)	0	(0)
2016–2021	Juve Stabia	118	(13)
2021–2022	Avellino	19	(1)
2022–2023	Lucchese	36	(4)
2023–2024	Alessandria	37	(4)
2024–	Siena	12	(1)

International career^{‡}
2011	Italy U16	1	(0)
2014	Italy U18	2	(1)
2014	Italy U19	3	(0)
- * Club domestic league appearances and goals as of 17 November 2024 ‡ National team caps and goals as of 9 September 2014

Alessandro Mastalli (born 7 February 1996) is an Italian professional footballer who plays as a midfielder for Serie D club Siena.

== Club career ==
Mastalli is a youth exponent from AC Milan. He made his Serie A debut at 24 May 2015 against Torino F.C. He replaced Andrea Poli after 76 minutes in a 3–0 home win.

At the start of the 2015–16 season, he moved to Swiss club Lugano on a one-year loan deal, but he moved back to Milan in January 2016.

On 14 July 2021, he signed a two-year contract with Avellino.

On 16 August 2022, Mastalli joined Lucchese.

On 1 September 2023, Mastalli signed a two-year contract with Alessandria.
