= Mauro Ghiozzi =

Italian footballer (born 2002)

Personal information
- Date of birth: 27 February 2002 (age 24)
- Height: 1.73 m (5 ft 8 in)
- Position: Midfielder

Team information
- Current team: Pavia
- Number: 33

Youth career
- Alessandria

Senior career*
Years	Team	Apps	(Gls)
2021–2023	Alessandria	28	(0)
2024	Sangiuliano City	4	(0)
2024	Mestre	8	(0)
2024–2025	Oltrepò	7	(0)
2025–	Pavia	5	(1)
- * Club domestic league appearances and goals as of 22 February 2026

Mauro Ghiozzi (born 27 February 2002) is an Italian footballer who plays as a midfielder for Serie D club Pavia.

== Club career ==
Ghiozzi made his Serie B debut for Alessandria on 19 March 2022 in a game against Ternana. On 20 October 2023, Ghiozzi's contract with Alessandria was mutually terminated.
