= Giovanni Foresta =

Italian footballer

Personal information
- Date of birth: 4 September 1995 (age 31)
- Place of birth: Catanzaro, Italy
- Height: 1.67 m (5 ft 6 in)
- Position: Midfielder

Team information
- Current team: Alessandria
- Number: 28

Youth career
- –2014: Crotone

Senior career*
Years	Team	Apps	(Gls)
2014–2017	Crotone	0	(0)
2015–2016	→ Catanzaro (loan)	20	(0)
2016–2017	→ ACR Messina (loan)	29	(1)
2017–2022	Carrarese	83	(1)
2022–2023	Gelbison	7	(0)
2023	Recanatese	10	(0)
2023–	Alessandria	17	(1)
- * Club domestic league appearances and goals as of 3 May 2024

Giovanni Foresta (born 4 September 1995) is an Italian footballer who plays as a midfielder for club Alessandria.

== Career ==
A Crotone youth product, Foresta played all of his career at Serie C level. In 2017 he joined Carrarese, during which he was also promoted to captain by head coach Silvio Baldini, who often praised him for his attitude and commitment.

He left Carrarese in August 2022, after five seasons with the Tuscans, to join newly promoted Serie C club Gelbison. On 1 February 2023, Foresta moved to Recanatese also in Serie C.

On 16 October 2023, Foresta signed with Alessandria.
