= Alberto Spagnoli =

Italian footballer (born 1994)

Personal information
- Date of birth: 2 October 1994 (age 32)
- Place of birth: Pordenone, Italia
- Height: 1.86 m (6 ft 1 in)
- Position: Forward

Team information
- Current team: Union Brescia
- Number: 91

Youth career
- –2010: Liventina
- 2010–2013: AC Milan
- 2011–2012: → Hellas Verona (loan)

Senior career*
Years	Team	Apps	(Gls)
2013–2015	Sacilese	63	(15)
2015–2017	Südtirol	46	(5)
2017–2018	Mestre	32	(6)
2018–2019	Renate	38	(1)
2019–2021	Modena	56	(10)
2021–2022	Feralpisalò	33	(4)
2022–2024	Ancona	63	(26)
2024–2025	Padova	30	(6)
2025–	Union Brescia	11	(3)
- * Club domestic league appearances and goals as of 29 April 2026

Alberto Spagnoli (born 2 October 1994) is an Italian professional footballer who plays as a forward for Serie C Group A club Union Brescia.

== Club career ==
On 1 July 2021 he joined to Serie C club Feralpisalò, after two seasons on Modena.

On 5 July 2022, Spagnoli moved to Ancona-Matelica.

On 2 July 2024, Spagnoli signed a three-season contract with Padova.
