= Edgaras Dubickas =

Lithuanian footballer

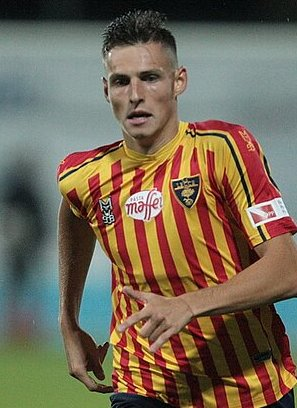

Personal information
- Date of birth: 9 July 1998 (age 28)
- Place of birth: Marijampolė, Lithuania
- Height: 1.82 m (6 ft 0 in)
- Position: Forward

Team information
- Current team: Suwon Samsung Bluewings
- Number: 98

Youth career
- 2015–2017: Švyturys Marijampolė
- 2016–2017: → Crotone (loan)

Senior career*
Years	Team	Apps	(Gls)
2014	Sūduva Marijampolė	0	(0)
2017–2018	Švyturys Marijampolė		
2017–2018	→ Lecce (loan)	16	(1)
2018–2021	Lecce	7	(0)
2019	→ Sicula Leonzio (loan)	9	(2)
2020	→ Gubbio (loan)	7	(0)
2021	→ Livorno (loan)	16	(5)
2021–2022	Piacenza	32	(10)
2022–2023	Pordenone	23	(5)
2023–2025	Pisa	0	(0)
2023	→ Pordenone (loan)	10	(3)
2023–2024	→ Catania (loan)	14	(0)
2024–2025	→ Feralpisalò (loan)	36	(9)
2025	→ Juve Stabia (loan)	5	(0)
2025–2026	Ternana	28	(10)
2026–	Suwon Samsung Bluewings	10	(2)

International career^{‡}
2016	Lithuania U-18	4	(0)
2016	Lithuania U-19	4	(0)
2017–2020	Lithuania U-21	11	(1)
2021–	Lithuania	8	(0)
- * Club domestic league appearances and goals as of 1 September 2026 ‡ National team caps and goals as of 20:20, 18 November 2026 (UTC)

Edgaras Dubickas (born 9 July 1998) is a Lithuanian professional footballer who plays as a forward for South Korean K League 2 club Suwon Samsung Bluewings and the Lithuania national team.

== Club career ==
He made his Serie C debut for Lecce on 30 September 2017 in a game against Bisceglie.

On 10 August 2018, following the loan in the 2017–18 season, he joined Lecce on a permanent basis, signing a three-year contract.

On 25 November 2019 he made his Serie A debut against Cagliari.

On 17 January 2020 he joined Serie C club Gubbio on loan.

On 1 February 2021 he was loaned to Serie C club Livorno.

On 6 July 2021, he signed a two-year contract with an additional option year with Piacenza.

On 19 August 2022, Dubickas signed a four-year contract with Pordenone.

On 31 January 2023, Dubickas signed with Pisa and was loaned back to Pordenone for the rest of the 2022–23 season.

On 24 August 2023, Dubickas moved on loan to Catania.

On 3 February 2025, Dubickas joined Juve Stabia in Serie B on loan with an option to buy.

On 1 September 2025, Dubickas transferred to Ternana as free agent.

== International career ==
Dubickas debuted with the senior Lithuania national team in a friendly 4–0 loss to Spain on 8 June 2021.
