= Alessandro Mercati =

Italian footballer (born 2002)

Personal information
- Date of birth: 12 April 2002 (age 24)
- Place of birth: Castelnovo ne' Monti, Italy
- Height: 1.81 m (5 ft 11 in)
- Position: Midfielder

Team information
- Current team: Union Brescia
- Number: 6

Youth career
- Sassuolo

Senior career*
Years	Team	Apps	(Gls)
2020–2024	Sassuolo	0	(0)
2021–2022	→ Montevarchi (loan)	36	(1)
2022–2023	→ Carrarese (loan)	24	(0)
2023–2024	→ Gubbio (loan)	35	(2)
2024–2025	Athens Kallithea	30	(0)
2025–	Union Brescia	21	(2)
- * Club domestic league appearances and goals as of 29 April 2026

Alessandro Mercati (born 12 April 2002) is an Italian professional footballer who plays as a midfielder for Serie C club Union Brescia.

== Club career ==
On 1 August 2022, Mercati joined Serie C club Carrarese on a season-long loan.

On 2 August 2023, Mercati joined fellow Serie C club Gubbio on a season-long loan.

On 14 August 2024, Mercati joined Greek side Athens Kallithea for an undisclosed fee.

== Career statistics ==
As of 21 October 2024

Appearances and goals by club, season and competition
Club	Season	League			Cup		Continental		Other		Total	
Club	Season	Division	Apps	Goals	Apps	Goals	Apps	Goals	Apps	Goals	Apps	Goals
Montevarchi (loan)	2021–22	Serie C	36	1	1	0	—		—		37	1
Carrarese (loan)	2022–23	Serie C	24	0	1	0	—		—		25	0
Gubbio (loan)	2023–24	Serie C	35	2	1	0	—		—		36	2
Athens Kallithea	2024–25	Superleague Greece 2	7	0	0	0	—		—		7	0
Career total			102	3	3	0	0	0	0	0	105	3
