= Federico Bergonzi =

Italian footballer (born 2001)

Personal information
- Date of birth: 12 January 2001 (age 25)
- Place of birth: Treviglio, Italy
- Height: 1.80 m (5 ft 11 in)
- Position: Right-back

Team information
- Current team: Atalanta U23
- Number: 66

Youth career
- –2020: Atalanta

Senior career*
Years	Team	Apps	(Gls)
2020–	Atalanta	0	(0)
2020–2024	→ Feralpisalò (loan)	131	(3)
2024–	→ Atalanta U23	50	(5)
- * Club domestic league appearances and goals as of 1 May 2026

Federico Bergonzi (born 12 January 2001) is an Italian professional footballer who plays as right-back for Serie C Group C side Atalanta U23.

== Career ==
Bergonzi began his career in the Atalanta Youth Sector. In the under-19 team, he made 17 appearances and two assists.

On 12 September 2020, he moved on loan to Feralpisalò in Serie C. On 16 July 2021, the loan was renewed for the 2021–22 season.

== Style of play ==
Federico Bergonzi is a very fast right-back.
