= Denis Hergheligiu =

Italian-born Romanian footballer (born 1999)

Personal information
- Full name: Denis Andrea Libera Hergheligiu
- Date of birth: 9 December 1999 (age 26)
- Place of birth: Chiari, Italy
- Height: 1.85 m (6 ft 1 in)
- Position: Midfielder

Team information
- Current team: Vado
- Number: 27

Youth career
- 2010–2019: Atalanta
- 2016–2019: → Feralpisalò (loan)

Senior career*
Years	Team	Apps	(Gls)
2017–2019	Atalanta	0	(0)
2017–2019	→ Feralpisalò (loan)	10	(0)
2019–2025	Feralpisalò	135	(1)
2025–2026	Union Brescia	1	(0)
2025–2026	→ Latina (loan)	23	(0)
2026–	Vado	4	(0)
- * Club domestic league appearances and goals as of 26 September 2026

Denis Andrea Libera Hergheligiu (born 9 December 1999) is a professional footballer who plays as a midfielder for Serie C Group B club Vado.

== Club career ==
=== Feralpisalò ===
He first joined Feralpisalò on loan in the summer of 2016, still in the junior teams. On 27 July 2018, as he reached senior team age, the loan was renewed for the 2018–19 season. He made his Serie C debut for FeralpiSalò on 21 October 2018 in a game against Ravenna, as a 68th-minute substitute for Fabio Scarsella. On 4 July 2019, he moved to Feralpisalò on a permanent basis, signing a 2-year contract.

== Career statistics ==
As of match played 26 September 2026

Appearances and goals by club, season and competition
Club	Season	League			National cup (Note: Includes Coppa Italia and Coppa Italia Serie C)		Europe		Other		Total	
Club	Season	Division	Apps	Goals	Apps	Goals	Apps	Goals	Apps	Goals	Apps	Goals
Feralpisalò (loan)	2017–18	Serie C	—		2	0	—		—		2	0
Feralpisalò (loan)	2018–19	Serie C	10	0	4	0	—		—		14	0
Feralpisalò	2019–20	Serie C	8	0	3	0	—		—		11	0
Feralpisalò	2020–21	Serie C	18	0	1	0	—		2 (Note: Appearances in Serie C promotion play-offs)	0	21	0
Feralpisalò	2021–22	Serie C	35	1	1	0	—		6	0	42	1
Feralpisalò	2022–23	Serie C	24	0	1	0	—		2 (Note: Appearances in Supercoppa di Serie C)	0	27	0
Feralpisalò	2023–24	Serie B	17	0	2	0	—		—		19	0
Feralpisalò	2024–25	Serie C	36	0	2	0	—		2	0	40	0
Feralpisalò	Total		148	1	16	0	—		12	0	176	1
Union Brescia	2025–26	Serie C	0	0	0	0	—		—		0	0
Union Brescia	2026–27	Serie C	1	0	1	0	—		—		2	0
Union Brescia	Total		1	0	1	0	—		—		2	0
Latina (loan)	2025–26	Serie C	23	0	3	1	—		—		26	1
Vado	2026–27	Serie C	4	0	1	0	—		—		5	0
Career total			176	1	21	1	—		12	0	209	2

== Personal life ==
He has dual Romanian-Italian citizenship.

== Honours ==
Feralpisalò

- Serie C: 2022–23 (group A)

Latina

- Coppa Italia Serie C runner-up: 2025–26
