= Alessandro Pilati =

Italian footballer (born 2000)

Personal information
- Date of birth: 26 March 2000 (age 26)
- Place of birth: Mantua, Italy
- Height: 1.90 m (6 ft 3 in)
- Position: Centre back

Team information
- Current team: Desenzano (on loan from Union Brescia)
- Number: 19

Youth career
- Mantova
- 2016–2020: Sassuolo

Senior career*
Years	Team	Apps	(Gls)
2020–2022	Sassuolo	0	(0)
2020–2021	→ Imolese (loan)	22	(1)
2021–2022	→ Mantova (loan)	14	(0)
2022–2025	Feralpisalò	68	(3)
2025–	Union Brescia	3	(0)
2026	→ Virtus Entella (loan)	1	(0)
2026–	→ Desenzano (loan)	1	(0)
- * Club domestic league appearances and goals as of 23 August 2026

Alessandro Pilati (born 26 March 2000) is an Italian professional footballer who plays as a centre back for Serie C Group A club Desenzano on loan from Union Brescia.

== Club career ==
Born in Mantua, Pilati started his career on local club Mantova. In 2016 he joined to Sassuolo youth system.

On 3 September 2020, he was loaned to Serie C club Imolese. He scored his first professional goal on 13 October 2020 against Carpi.

On 28 July 2021, Pilati was loaned to Mantova.

On 15 July 2022, Pilati signed a three-year deal with Feralpisalò.

On 2 February 2026, he was loaned by Serie B club Virtus Entella, with an option to buy.
