= Alberto Rizzo (footballer) =

Italian association football player (born 1997)

Personal information
- Date of birth: 25 April 1997 (age 29)
- Place of birth: Erice, Italy
- Height: 1.75 m (5 ft 9 in)
- Position: Defender

Team information
- Current team: Union Brescia
- Number: 3

Youth career
- –2016: Trapani
- 2015–2016: → Bologna (loan)

Senior career*
Years	Team	Apps	(Gls)
2014	Trapani	0	(0)
2016–2018	Trapani	25	(1)
2016–2017	→ Cuneo (loan)	28	(0)
2018–2020	Cittadella	14	(0)
2020–2022	Juve Stabia	50	(0)
2022–2024	Foggia	70	(1)
2024–2025	Feralpisalò	31	(0)
2025–	Union Brescia	33	(1)
- * Club domestic league appearances and goals as of 29 April 2026

Alberto Rizzo (born 25 April 1997) is an Italian footballer who plays as a defender for Serie C Group A club Union Brescia.

== Club career ==
He made his Serie C debut for Trapani on 2 September 2017 in a game against Lecce.

On 19 September 2020, he signed with Juve Stabia.

On 20 January 2022, he signed a contract with Foggia until 30 June 2024.

On 14 July 2024, Rizzo joined Feralpisalò on a two-year deal.
