= Lorenzo Giubilato =

Italian footballer

Personal information
- Date of birth: 6 December 2000 (age 25)
- Place of birth: Italy
- Height: 1.82 m (6 ft 0 in)
- Position: Centre back

Team information
- Current team: Alessandria
- Number: 13

Youth career
- Valenza
- Alessandria

Senior career*
Years	Team	Apps	(Gls)
2018–2020	Alessandria	0	(0)
2018–2019	→ Sanremese Calcio (loan)	23	(0)
2019–2020	→ Pro Sesto (loan)	24	(0)
2020–2023	Pro Sesto	71	(0)
2023–	Alessandria	9	(0)
- * Club domestic league appearances and goals as of 3 May 2024

Lorenzo Giubilato (born 6 December 2000) is an Italian professional footballer who plays as a centre back for Serie D club Alessandria.

== Club career ==
Giubilato was formed in Alessandria youth system.

In 2018, he was loaned to Serie D club Sanremese Calcio.

He joined to Pro Sesto on loan for the 2019–20 season. The next year, he signed for Pro Sesto permanently.

On 2 September 2023, Giubilato returned to Alessandria.
