= Jacopo Pellegrini =

Italian footballer (born 2000)

Personal information
- Date of birth: 12 September 2000 (age 26)
- Place of birth: Reggio Emilia, Italy
- Height: 1.82 m (6 ft 0 in)
- Position: Forward

Team information
- Current team: Union Brescia
- Number: 30

Senior career*
Years	Team	Apps	(Gls)
2019–2024	Sassuolo	0	(0)
2020–2021	→ Gubbio (loan)	32	(6)
2021–2022	→ Pordenone (loan)	17	(0)
2022–2023	→ Reggiana (loan)	35	(10)
2023–2024	→ Vicenza (loan)	35	(6)
2024–2025	Feralpisalò	19	(1)
2025	→ Monopoli (loan)	9	(3)
2025–	Union Brescia	1	(0)
2025–2026	→ Trento (loan)	38	(9)
- * Club domestic league appearances and goals as of 21 August 2026

Jacopo Pellegrini (born 12 September 2000) is an Italian professional footballer who plays as a forward for Serie C Group A club Union Brescia.

== Club career ==
Pellegrini made his professional debut for Sassuolo in a 2–1 Coppa Italia loss to Perugia on 4 December 2019.

On 23 May 2020 he signed his first professional contract for Sassuolo.

On 8 September 2020 he joined Serie C club Gubbio on loan.

On 22 July 2021, he moved to Pordenone in Serie B on a season-long loan.

On 13 July 2022, Pellegrini joined Reggiana on loan.

On 24 August 2023, Pellegrini moved on loan to Vicenza, with an option to buy.

On 3 August 2024, he joined Feralpisalò on permanent basis.
