= Luca Liverani =

Italian footballer

Personal information
- Date of birth: 2 June 1989 (age 37)
- Place of birth: Ravenna, Italy
- Height: 1.83 m (6 ft 0 in)
- Position: Goalkeeper

Team information
- Current team: Union Brescia
- Number: 1

Youth career
- 2005–2008: Ravenna

Senior career*
Years	Team	Apps	(Gls)
2008–2009	Jesolo	33	(0)
2009–2010	Viterbese	28	(0)
2010–2012	Celano	51	(0)
2012–2015	Barletta	82	(0)
2015–2016	Catania	23	(0)
2016–2017	Paganese	15	(0)
2017–2019	Monza	47	(0)
2019–2022	Feralpisalò	17	(0)
2022–2024	Alessandria	41	(0)
2024–2025	Feralpisalò	8	(0)
2025–	Union Brescia	0	(0)
- * Club domestic league appearances and goals as of 25 April 2025

Luca Liverani (born 2 June 1989) is an Italian footballer who plays as a goalkeeper for Serie C Group A club Union Brescia.

== Club career ==
On 10 June 2017, Liverani joined Monza.

On 11 July 2019, he signed a 2-year contract with Feralpisalò.

On 31 August 2022, Liverani joined Alessandria on a one-year contract. On 26 January 2024, Alessandria announced Liverani's return to Feralpisalò.
