= AC Ospitaletto Franciacorta =

Italian football club

Ospitaletto
- Full name: Associazione Calcio; Ospitaletto Franciacorta
- Founded: 1923; 2000 (refounded)
- Ground: Stadio Gino Corioni, Ospitaletto, Italy
- Capacity: 4,000
- Chairman: Giuseppe Taini
- Manager: Andrea Quaresmini
- League: Serie C Group A
- 2025–26: Serie C Group A, 15th of 20
- Website: https://www.acospitaletto.it/
Home colours	Away colours

AC Ospitaletto Franciacorta, commonly known as Ospitaletto, is an Italian association football club located in Ospitaletto, Lombardy. The club currently plays in Serie C Group A.

== Current squad ==
As of 26 August 2026

Note: Flags indicate national team as defined under FIFA eligibility rules; some limited exceptions apply. Players may hold more than one non-FIFA nationality.

No.	Pos.	Nation	Player
1	GK	ITA	Cristiano Fratti
3	DF	ITA	Marcello Possenti
4	DF	ITA	Riccardo Nessi
7	FW	ITA	Claudio Messaggi
8	MF	ITA	Edoardo Tigani (on loan from Parma)
9	FW	ITA	Francesco Gobbi
10	MF	ITA	Simone Cantamessa
11	FW	ITA	Federico Ragnoli Galli (on loan from Cremonese)
14	FW	ITA	Francesco Galuppini (on loan from Ascoli)
15	DF	ITA	Pietro Parmiggiani (on loan from Atalanta)
16	MF	ITA	Matteo Gualandris
17	FW	ITA	Artem Plutnik
18	DF	ITA	Michele Paganotti (on loan from Cremonese)

No.	Pos.	Nation	Player
20	DF	ITA	Michele Casali
21	FW	ITA	Alessandro Torri
22	GK	ITA	Mathias Ferrante (on loan from Napoli)
24	DF	ITA	Giorgio Valota
26	MF	ITA	Gabriele Mondini
28	MF	ITA	Michel Panatti (captain)
43	MF	ITA	Mattia Guarneri
45	FW	ITA	Mattia Valente (on loan from Union Brescia)
55	GK	ITA	Riccardo Mundi
77	FW	ITA	Davide Stefanoni
95	DF	ITA	Cristian Poiatti
98	MF	ITA	Francesco Ferrari
