= Luigi Samele (footballer) =

Italian footballer (born 2002)

Personal information
- Date of birth: 9 April 2002 (age 24)
- Place of birth: Foggia, Italy
- Height: 1.86 m (6 ft 1 in)
- Position: Forward

Team information
- Current team: Giana Erminio
- Number: 29

Youth career
- 2014–2018: Bari
- 2018–2019: Foggia
- 2019–2020: Teramo

Senior career*
| Years | Team | Apps | (Gls) |
| 2020–2021 | Monopoli | 12 | (1) |
| 2021 | → Sassuolo (loan) | 0 | (0) |
| 2021–2024 | Sassuolo | 2 | (0) |
| 2022–2023 | → Carrarese (loan) | 9 | (1) |
| 2023 | → Cerignola (loan) | 12 | (1) |
| 2023–2024 | → Taranto (loan) | 16 | (0) |
| 2024 | → Alessandria (loan) | 11 | (2) |
| 2024–2026 | Alcione | 43 | (4) |
| 2026– | Giana Erminio | 15 | (4) |
- * Club domestic league appearances and goals as of 30 April 2026

Luigi Samele (born 9 April 2002) is an Italian professional footballer who plays as a forward for Serie C Group A club Giana Erminio.

== Club career ==
Luigi Samele made his professional debut for Monopoli on the 23 September 2020, replacing Álvaro Montero in a 1–0 Coppa Italia home win against Modena.

On 6 January 2022 he debuted in Serie A for Sassuolo in 1–1 draw against Genoa.

In August 2022, Samele was loaned to Carrarese. On 20 January 2023, Samele moved on a new loan to Cerignola.

On 11 July 2023, Samele joined Taranto on loan.

On 31 January 2024 he moved on loan to Alessandria, in Group A of Serie C, after ending his loan with Taranto early, with whom he made 16 appearances.

On 7 January 2026, Samele joined Giana Erminio on permanent basis.
