= Union Brescia =

Italian association football club

- Full name: Union Brescia srl
- Nicknames: I Biancazzurri (The White and Blues); La Leonessa (The Lioness)
- Founded: 17 July 2025; 14 months ago
- Ground: Stadio Mario Rigamonti
- Capacity: 23,550
- Owner: Giuseppe Pasini
- President: Giuseppe Pasini
- Head coach: Eugenio Corini
- League: Serie C Group A
- 2025–26: Serie C Group A, 2nd of 20
- Website: unionbrescia.com
Home colours	Away colours

Union Brescia, commonly referred to as Brescia (Italian pronunciation: [ˈbreʃʃa]), is an Italian professional football club based in Brescia, Lombardy. The club was founded in 2025, following the relocation of Feralpisalò to the city of Brescia after the disbandment of the original Brescia Calcio club.

The team's colours are blue and white, and they play their home games at the Stadio Mario Rigamonti.

== History ==
The team was founded in 2025, following the relocation of the neighbouring Serie C club Feralpisalò to Brescia. This came after the original Brescia Calcio was relegated from Serie B and subsequently denied admission to Serie C due to financial issues. The move was facilitated by Brescia Mayor Laura Castelletti to ensure the presence of a professional club in the city.

The new club's identity was announced on 17 July 2025 by owner and chairman Giuseppe Pasini.

== Recent seasons ==
Season	Division	Tier	Pos	Pl	W	D	L	+	-	P	Cup	Note
2025–26	Serie C (Group A)	III	2	38	19	12	7	49	24	69	–	Lost in the Promotion play-offs final to Ascoli

== Current squad ==
As of 1 September 2026

Note: Flags indicate national team as defined under FIFA eligibility rules; some limited exceptions apply. Players may hold more than one non-FIFA nationality.

No.	Pos.	Nation	Player
1	GK	ITA	Luca Liverani
3	DF	ITA	Alberto Rizzo
4	DF	DEN	Frederik Sørensen
5	DF	ITA	Nicola Pasini
6	MF	ITA	Alessandro Mercati
7	FW	ITA	Davide Di Molfetta
8	MF	ITA	Davide Balestrero (captain)
9	FW	ITA	Valerio Crespi
12	GK	ITA	Samuel Henry Mbengue (on loan from Tabor Sežana)
14	MF	ITA	Alessandro Mallamo
15	MF	ARG	Tiago Casasola
17	FW	ITA	Manuel Marras
18	MF	ITA	Vincent De Maria
20	MF	ITA	Mattia Zennaro

No.	Pos.	Nation	Player
24	DF	ALB	Brayan Boci
25	MF	ITA	Andrea Rizzo Pinna
26	MF	ITA	Marco Frigerio (on loan from Südtirol)
27	MF	ITA	Alessandro Lamesta
28	DF	ITA	Luigi Silvestri
30	FW	ITA	Jacopo Pellegrini
43	GK	ITA	Gioele Zacchi (on loan from Sassuolo)
44	MF	ITA	Davide Guglielmotti
55	GK	ITA	Nicola Grazioli
66	GK	ITA	Stefano Gori
72	MF	ITA	Filippo Armanini
82	DF	ITA	Loris Armati
91	FW	ITA	Alberto Spagnoli
95	DF	ALB	Samuele Sina

=== Out on loan ===
Note: Flags indicate national team as defined under FIFA eligibility rules; some limited exceptions apply. Players may hold more than one non-FIFA nationality.

No.	Pos.	Nation	Player
—	GK	ITA	Mattia Damioli (at Como U20 until 30 June 2027)
—	GK	KOS	Leonard Kolgecaj (at Mestre until 30 June 2027)
—	DF	ITA	Alessandro Pilati (at Desenzano until 30 June 2027)
—	MF	ITA	Andrea Cisco (at Perugia until 30 June 2027)

No.	Pos.	Nation	Player
—	MF	ITA	Lorenzo Di Cintio (at Vigor Campagnano until 30 June 2027)
—	MF	ITA	Riccardo Fogliata (at Campobasso until 30 June 2027)
—	FW	ITA	Luca Vido (at Monopoli until 30 June 2027)
—	FW	ITA	Mattia Valente (at Ospitaletto until 30 June 2027)
