= AS Giana Erminio =

Italian football club

Giana Erminio
- Full name: Associazione Sportiva Giana Erminio S.r.l.
- Nicknames: La Giana; I Biancazzurri (The White & Light Blue); I Ragazzi della Martesana (The Boys of Martesana)
- Founded: 1909; 1931 (refounded)
- Ground: Città di Gorgonzola, Gorgonzola, Italy
- Capacity: 3,766
- Chairman: Oreste Bamonte
- Manager: Mario Tacchinardi
- League: Serie C Group A
- 2025–26: Serie C Group A, 10th of 20
- Website: http://www.asgiana.com/
Home colours	Away colours	Third colours

Associazione Sportiva Giana Erminio S.r.l. is an Italian football club based in Gorgonzola, Lombardy. The team currently plays in Italy's Serie C Group A.

== History ==
The club was founded in 1909 as Unione Sportiva Argentia, and later adopted the current name in honour of Erminio Giana, an alpino born in Gorgonzola, killed during World War I. After decades competing in the Italian regional leagues, in the 2012–13 season the club won the B group of Eccellenza Lombardy, and was promoted to the Serie D for the first time in its history. The following season the team won the A group of the 2013-14 Serie D, obtaining promotion to the 2014-15 Serie C.

Since its first season, the club established as a mid-table team in the league, also qualifying to the promotion playoffs during the 2016–17 season. In June 2018, 68-year old long time head coach Cesare Albè ended his 22-year tenure in charge of the club to become the club's vice-president; he was replaced as head coach by his assistant Raul Bertarelli. Cesare Albè returned as head coach between January and February 2019, and again from September 2019, following the dismissal of Riccardo Maspero. Giana was relegated back to Serie D by the end of the 2019–20 Serie C season, but was subsequently readmitted to fill a vacancy in the third division. In December 2020, Albé left his coaching duties for good, moving back to his previous role as vice-president, and was replaced by Oscar Brevi.

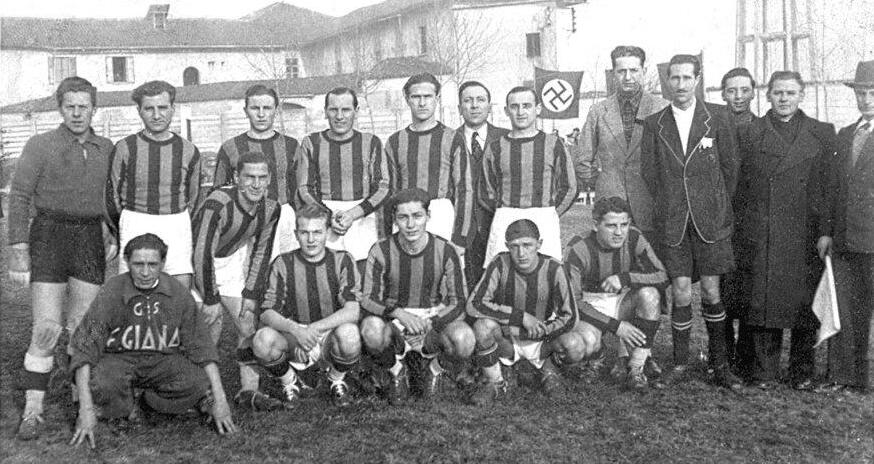
A.S. Giana Erminio in 1939

== Players ==
=== Current squad ===
As of 26 August 2026

Note: Flags indicate national team as defined under FIFA eligibility rules; some limited exceptions apply. Players may hold more than one non-FIFA nationality.

No.	Pos.	Nation	Player
1	GK	ITA	Alexander Zenti
3	DF	ITA	Tommaso Nucifero
4	DF	ITA	Andrea Piazza
5	MF	ITA	Samuele Ghezzi
6	MF	ITA	Nicholas Saggionetto
7	MF	ITA	Daniele Pinto (Captain)
8	FW	ITA	Luca Magazzú
9	FW	ITA	Alessio Quaggio
10	MF	ITA	Federico Renda
11	MF	ITA	Simone Comelli
12	GK	ITA	Emilio Azzolari
13	DF	ITA	Mattia Golin
14	MF	ITA	Matteo Marotta

No.	Pos.	Nation	Player
17	FW	ITA	Gabriel Avinci
19	DF	ITA	Christian Mora
21	MF	ALB	Endri Muhameti (on loan from Atalanta)
22	GK	ITA	Andrea Mazza
23	DF	ITA	Pietro Tornaghi (on loan from Atalanta)
24	DF	ITA	Luca Ruffini
25	MF	ITA	Mattia Zanchetta (on loan from Inter Milan)
26	MF	ITA	Marco Ballabio
27	DF	ITA	Francesco Manzoni
28	DF	ITA	Christian Di Bitonto
29	FW	ITA	Luigi Samele
60	DF	ITA	Enrico Rovinelli

== Trophies ==
- Eccellenza:
  - Promotion to Serie D: 2012–13
- Serie D:
  - Serie D Girone A winners: 2013–14
