= 2024–25 US Sassuolo Calcio season =

US Sassuolo Calcio
2024–25 season
- Owner: Mapei
- Chairman: Carlo Rossi
- Head coach: Fabio Grosso
- Stadium: Mapei Stadium – Città del Tricolore
- Serie B: 1st (promoted)
- Coppa Italia: Round of 16
- Top goalscorer: League: Armand Laurienté (18); All: Armand Laurienté (19)
Home colours	Away colours	Third colours

The 2024–25 season was the 105th season in the history of US Sassuolo Calcio, and the club's first season in Serie B since 2013, following relegation from the top flight in the previous campaign. In addition to the domestic league, the club participated in the Coppa Italia.

Sassuolo won Serie B, earning promotion back to Serie A at the first attempt.

== Players ==
=== First-team squad ===
As of 30 August 2024

Note: Flags indicate national team as defined under FIFA eligibility rules; some limited exceptions apply. Players may hold more than one non-FIFA nationality.

No.	Pos.	Nation	Player
1	GK	ITA	Alessandro Russo
2	DF	ITA	Filippo Missori
3	DF	SCO	Josh Doig
7	FW	ITA	Cristian Volpato
8	MF	ITA	Andrea Ghion
9	FW	ITA	Samuele Mulattieri
10	FW	ITA	Domenico Berardi (captain)
11	MF	ITA	Daniel Boloca
12	GK	ITA	Giacomo Satalino
14	MF	GEQ	Pedro Obiang
15	DF	ITA	Edoardo Pieragnolo
17	DF	COL	Yeferson Paz
19	DF	ITA	Filippo Romagna
20	DF	ITA	Matteo Lovato (on loan from Salernitana)
23	DF	GER	Jeremy Toljan

No.	Pos.	Nation	Player
24	FW	ITA	Luca Moro
25	FW	ITA	Luca D'Andrea
26	DF	NED	Cas Odenthal
28	FW	FRA	Janis Antiste
29	MF	ITA	Fabrizio Caligara
31	GK	ROU	Horațiu Moldovan (on loan from Atlético Madrid)
35	MF	ITA	Luca Lipani
40	MF	ITA	Edoardo Iannoni
42	MF	NOR	Kristian Thorstvedt
44	DF	ITA	Kevin Miranda
45	FW	FRA	Armand Laurienté
55	MF	ITA	Justin Kumi
77	FW	ITA	Nicholas Pierini
80	DF	BIH	Tarik Muharemović (on loan from Juventus Next Gen)
91	FW	ITA	Flavio Russo

== Transfers ==
=== In ===
Pos.	Player	Transferred from	Fee	Date	Source
FW	(Italy) Janis Antiste	(Italy) Reggiana	Loan return	30 June 2024	
FW	(Italy) Luca D'Andrea	(Italy) Catanzaro	Loan return	30 June 2024	
MF	(Italy) Andrea Ghion	(Italy) Catanzaro	Loan return	30 June 2024	
DF	(Italy) Kevin Miranda	(Italy) Catanzaro	Loan return	30 June 2024	
DF	(Colombia) Yeferson Paz	(Italy) Perugia	Loan return	30 June 2024	
DF	(Italy) Edoardo Pieragnolo	(Italy) Reggiana	Loan return	30 June 2024	
DF	(Italy) Filippo Romagna	(Italy) Reggiana	Loan return	30 June 2024	
GK	(Italy) Giacomo Satalino	(Italy) Reggiana	Loan return	30 June 2024	
GK	(Italy) Alessandro Russo	(Italy) Trento	Loan return	30 June 2024	
MF	(Italy) Fabrizio Caligara	(Italy) Ascoli	€500,000	20 July 2024	
DF	(Netherlands) Cas Odenthal	(Italy) Como	€1,200,000	31 July 2024	
DF	(Italy) Matteo Lovato	(Italy) Salernitana	Loan	7 August 2024	
MF	(Italy) Edoardo Iannoni	(Italy) Perugia	€1,000,000	23 August 2024	
GK	(Romania) Horațiu Moldovan	(Spain) Atlético Madrid	Loan	23 August 2024	
DF	(Bosnia and Herzegovina) Tarik Muharemović	(Italy) Juventus Next Gen	Loan	28 August 2024	
FW	(Italy) Nicholas Pierini	(Italy) Venezia	€2,000,000	30 August 2024	

=== Out ===
Pos.	Player	Transferred to	Fee	Date	Source
MF	(Italy) Angelo Foresta	(Italy) Pistoiese	End of contract	30 June 2024	
GK	(Italy) Gianluca Pegolo	Unattached	End of contract	30 June 2024	
FW	(Spain) Samu Castillejo	(Spain) Valencia	Loan return	30 June 2024	
GK	(Italy) Alessio Cragno	(Italy) Monza	Loan return	30 June 2024	
DF	(Albania) Marash Kumbulla	(Italy) Roma	Loan return	30 June 2024	
MF	(Norway) Marcus Pedersen	(Netherlands) Feyenoord	Loan return	30 June 2024	
DF	(Italy) Mattia Viti	(France) Nice	Loan return	30 June 2024	
DF	(Italy) Federico Artioli	(Italy) Mantova	Undisclosed	1 July 2024	
DF	(Netherlands) Ryan Flamingo	(Netherlands) Utrecht	€2,750,000	1 July 2024	
MF	(Italy) Davide Frattesi	(Italy) Inter Milan	€31,400,000	1 July 2024	
MF	(Greece) Giorgos Kyriakopoulos	(Italy) Monza	€3,000,000	1 July 2024	
FW	(Italy) Riccardo Ciervo	(Italy) Cosenza	Loan	6 July 2024	
MF	(Italy) Federico Casolari	(Italy) Cittadella	Undisclosed	10 July 2024	
MF	(Brazil) Matheus Henrique	(Brazil) Cruzeiro	€8,500,000	10 July 2024	
FW	(Italy) Giacomo Manzari	(Italy) Bari	Undisclosed	12 July 2024	
MF	(Italy) Matteo Saccani	(Italy) Latina	Undisclosed	12 July 2024	
GK	(Italy) Gioele Zacchi	(Italy) Latina	Loan	12 July 2024	
GK	(Italy) Bryan Bonucci	(Italy) Sarnese	Undisclosed	17 July 2024	
MF	(Romania) Andrei Mărginean	(Romania) Dinamo București	Loan	19 July 2024	
MF	(Italy) Christian Aucelli	(Italy) Trento	Undisclosed	31 July 2024	
DF	(Croatia) Martin Erlić	(Italy) Bologna	€7,000,000	2 August 2024	
FW	(Italy) Jacopo Pellegrini	(Italy) Feralpisalò	Undisclosed	4 August 2024	
FW	(Italy) Luigi Samele	(Italy) Alcione Milano	Undisclosed	6 August 2024	
FW	(France) Grégoire Defrel	(Italy) Modena	Free	7 August 2024	
MF	(Italy) Alessandro Mercati	(Greece) Athens Kallithea	Undisclosed	14 August 2024	
FW	(Norway) Emil Konradsen Ceïde	(Norway) Rosenborg	Loan	16 August 2024	
FW	(Italy) Andrea Pinamonti	(Italy) Genoa	Loan	16 August 2024	
FW	(Uruguay) Agustín Álvarez	(Spain) Elche	Loan	17 August 2024	
DF	(Brazil) Ruan Tressoldi	(Brazil) São Paulo	Loan	19 August 2024	
MF	(Serbia) Uroš Račić	(England) West Bromwich Albion	Loan	22 August 2024	
GK	(Italy) Stefano Turati	(Italy) Monza	Loan	23 August 2024	
MF	(France) Maxime Lopez	(France) Paris	Free	29 August 2024	
MF	(Niger) Salim Abubakar	(Italy) Pergolettese	Loan	30 August 2024	
MF	(Albania) Nedim Bajrami	(Scotland) Rangers	€4,000,000	30 August 2024	
DF	(Italy) Gian Marco Ferrari	(Italy) Salernitana	Free	30 August 2024	
DF	(Italy) Stefano Piccinini	(Italy) Cittadella	Undisclosed	30 August 2024	

== Friendlies ==
=== Pre-season ===
20 July 2024 Friendly	Sassuolo (Italy)	2–0	(Italy) SPAL	Val di Non
	Pinamonti 17'; Mulattieri 40'	Report		Referee: Kevin Bonacina

21 July 2024 Friendly	Sassuolo (Italy)	1–0	(Italy) Real Vicenza
17:30

24 July 2024 Friendly	Sassuolo (Italy)	3–1	(Italy) Trento
16:00

31 July 2024 Friendly	Sassuolo (Italy)	1–0	(Italy) Padova
18:30	Volpato 87'

3 August 2024 Friendly	Monza (Italy)	2–2	(Italy) Sassuolo
17:00

== Competitions ==
=== Overall record ===
Competition	First match	Last match	Starting round	Final position	Record							
Competition	First match	Last match	Starting round	Final position	Pld	W	D	L	GF	GA	GD	Win %
Serie B	18 August 2024	13 May 2025	Matchday 1	Winners	38	25	7	6	78	38	+40	65.79
Coppa Italia	9 August 2024	3 December 2024	First round	Round of 16	3	2	0	1	5	7	−2	66.67
Total					41	27	7	7	83	45	+38	65.85

Source: Soccerway

=== Serie B ===
==== League table ====
Pos	Team	Pld	W	D	L	GF	GA	GD	Pts	Promotion, qualification or relegation
1	Sassuolo (C, P)	38	25	7	6	78	38	+40	82	Promotion to Serie A
2	Pisa (P)	38	23	7	8	64	35	+29	76	Promotion to Serie A
3	Spezia	38	17	15	6	59	33	+26	66	Promotion play-offs semi-finals
4	Cremonese (O, P)	38	16	13	9	62	44	+18	61	Promotion play-offs semi-finals
5	Juve Stabia	38	14	13	11	42	41	+1	55	Promotion play-offs preliminary round

Source: Serie BKT
Rules for classification: 1) Points; 2) Head-to-head points; 3) Head-to-head goal difference; 4) Goal difference; 5) Goals scored; 6) Draw.
(Note: Head-to-head record is used only after all the matches between the teams in question have been played)
(C) Champions; (O) Play-off winners; (P) Promoted

==== Results summary ====
Overall								Home						Away					
Pld	W	D	L	GF	GA	GD	Pts	W	D	L	GF	GA	GD	W	D	L	GF	GA	GD
38	25	7	6	78	38	+40	82	14	2	3	43	17	+26	11	5	3	35	21	+14

Source: Soccerway

==== Results by round ====
Round	1	2	3	4	5	6	7	8	9	10	11	12	13	14	15	16	17	18	19	20	21	22	23	24	25	26	27	28	29	30	31	32	33	34	35	36	37	38
Ground	A	H	A	H	A	A	H	H	A	H	A	H	A	H	A	H	A	H	A	H	A	H	A	H	A	H	A	H	H	A	H	A	A	H	A	H	A	H
Result	D	W	D	L	W	W	D	W	W	W	D	W	W	W	W	W	W	W	L	W	W	W	L	W	W	W	D	W	D	W	W	L	W	L	W	W	D	L
Position	12	7	7	13	6	3	4	3	3	2	2	2	2	1	1	1	1	1	1	1	1	1	1	1	1	1	1	1	1	1	1	1	1	1	1	1	1	1

Source: worldfootball
A = Away; H = Home; W = Win; D = Draw; L = Loss

==== Matches ====
The match schedule was released on 10 July 2024.

18 August 2024 1	Catanzaro	1–1	Sassuolo	Catanzaro
20:30 CET	Pontisso (yellow card) 35' (goal) 53'; Petriccione (yellow card) 71'; Matias Antonini (yellow card) 90+3'	Report	Thorstvedt (yellow card) 29'; Mulattieri 38'; Laurienté (yellow card) 58'; Odenthal (yellow card) 67'; Romagna (yellow card) 80'	Stadium: Stadio Nicola Ceravolo; Attendance: 12,490; Referee: (Italy) Marco Piccinini

24 August 2024 2	Sassuolo	2–1	Cesena	Reggio Emilia
20:30 CET	Antiste 34' (yellow card) 74'; Odenthal (yellow card) 36'; Flavio Russo 65'; Boloca (yellow card) 90+4'	Report	Curto (yellow card) 10' (goal) 53'; Berti (yellow card) 80'	Stadium: Mapei Stadium – Città del Tricolore; Attendance: 5,017; Referee: (Italy) Luca Massimi

27 August 2024 3	Bari	1–1	Sassuolo	Bari
20:30 CET	Lasagna 90+3'; Novakovich (yellow card) 90+6'	Report	Thorstvedt 19'; Lovato (red card) 35'; Antiste (yellow card) 85'	Stadium: Stadio San Nicola; Attendance: 15,733; Referee: (Italy) Federico La Penna

31 August 2024 4	Sassuolo	1–4	Cremonese	Reggio Emilia
20:30 CET	Moro 31' (pen.); Boloca (yellow card) 33'; Romagna (yellow card) 59'	Report	Nasti 20'; Collocolo 35'; Johnsen 43'; Antov (yellow card) 65'; Sernicola 87'	Stadium: Mapei Stadium – Città del Tricolore; Attendance: 4,752; Referee: (Italy) Gianluca Manganiello

15 September 2024 5	Carrarese	0–2	Sassuolo	Pisa
15:00 CET		Report	Pedro Obiang (yellow card) 75'; Mulattieri 77'; Volpato (yellow card) 81'; Thorstvedt 90+4'	Stadium: Arena Garibaldi – Stadio Romeo Anconetani; Attendance: 2,777; Referee: (Italy) Maurizio Mariani

21 September 2024 6	Cosenza	0–1	Sassuolo	Cosenza
15:00 CET	Kouan (yellow card) 9'; Venturi (yellow card) 28'; Sankoh (yellow card) 74'	Report	Iannoni (yellow card) 6'; Laurienté 52'; Paz (yellow card) 81'; Mulattieri (yellow card) 85'; Lipani (yellow card) 90+1'	Stadium: Stadio San Vito-Gigi Marulla; Attendance: 7,922; Referee: (Italy) Alberto Arena

28 September 2024 7	Sassuolo	0–0	Spezia	Reggio Emilia
15:00 CET	Paz (yellow card) 11'; Doig (yellow card) 64'	Report	Bandinelli (yellow card) 31'; Wiśniewski (yellow card) 68'	Stadium: Mapei Stadium – Città del Tricolore; Attendance: 5,405; Referee: (Italy) Marco Piccinini

5 October 2024 8	Sassuolo	6–1	Cittadella	Reggio Emilia
15:00 CET	Mulattieri 4'; Volpato 55'; Thorstvedt 63' (pen.) 82'; Pierini 68'; Laurienté 72' (pen.)	Report	Vita 17' (yellow card) 34'; Carissoni (yellow card) 41'; Pavan (yellow card) 51'; Rabbi (yellow card) 88'	Stadium: Mapei Stadium – Città del Tricolore; Attendance: 3,956; Referee: (Italy) Mario Perri

19 October 2024 9	Brescia	2–5	Sassuolo	Brescia
17:15 CET	Fogliata 20'; Verreth (yellow card) 25'; Besaggio (yellow card) 66'; Bjarnason 83'	Report	Boloca 2'; Volpato (yellow card) 53' (goal) 55'; Laurienté 57' (yellow card) 63'; Berardi (yellow card) 68'; Iannoni 81'; Pierini 90+3'	Stadium: Stadio Mario Rigamonti; Attendance: 4,014; Referee: (Italy) Alessandro Prontera

26 October 2024 10	Sassuolo	2–0	Modena	Reggio Emilia
17:15 CET	Iannoni (yellow card) 33'; Laurienté 41' (pen.); Volpato (yellow card) 45+1'; Thorstvedt 64'	Report		Stadium: Mapei Stadium – Città del Tricolore; Attendance: 7,752; Referee: (Italy) Luca Pairetto

29 October 2024 11	Juve Stabia	2–2	Sassuolo	Castellammare di Stabia
20:30 CET	Maistro 36'; Adorante 60'	Report	Pierini 32' 59' (yellow card) 65'; Volpato (red card) 90+7'	Stadium: Stadio Romeo Menti; Attendance: 4,589; Referee: (Italy) Davide Ghersini

3 November 2024 12	Sassuolo	1–0	Mantova	Reggio Emilia
17:15 CET	Laurienté (yellow card) 23'; Berardi 63' (pen.)	Report	Solini (yellow card) 16'; Muroni (yellow card) 58'	Stadium: Mapei Stadium – Città del Tricolore; Attendance: 6,182; Referee: (Italy) Francesco Cosso

9 November 2024 13	Südtirol	0–1	Sassuolo	Bolzano
15:00 CET	Merkaj (yellow card) 51'	Report	Laurienté 57'; Mulattieri (yellow card) 70'	Stadium: Stadio Druso; Attendance: 3,513; Referee: (Italy) Antonio Giua

23 November 2024 14	Sassuolo	4–0	Salernitana	Reggio Emilia
15:00 CET	Pierini 64'; Laurienté 82'; Moro 90' (pen.); Thorstvedt 90+6'	Report	Bronn (yellow card) 16'; Tello (yellow card) 41'	Stadium: Mapei Stadium – Città del Tricolore; Attendance: 5,113; Referee: (Italy) Valerio Crezzini

29 November 2024 15	Reggiana	0–2	Sassuolo	Reggio Emilia
20:30 CET	Sersanti (yellow card) 13'; Portanova (yellow card) 28'; Sampirisi (yellow card) 45+1'; Marras (yellow card) 48'; Meroni (yellow card) 50'; Girma (yellow card) 72'	Report	Thorstvedt (yellow card) 21' (goal) 45+1'; Laurienté (yellow card) 28'; Edoardo Pieragnolo (yellow card) 43'; Mulattieri (yellow card) 68' (goal) 77'; Paz (yellow card) 74'; Odenthal (yellow card) 80'	Stadium: Mapei Stadium – Città del Tricolore; Attendance: 11,308; Referee: (Italy) Francesco Fourneau

8 December 2024 16	Sassuolo	5–1	Sampdoria	Reggio Emilia
17:15 CET	Thorstvedt (yellow card) 9'; Laurienté 25'; Odenthal 45'; Pierini 64'; Berardi 74' 90'	Report	Ferrari (yellow card) 30'; Benedetti (yellow card) 60'; Coda 81' (pen.)	Stadium: Mapei Stadium – Città del Tricolore; Attendance: 5,638; Referee: (Italy) Maria Sole Ferrieri Caputi

14 December 2024 17	Frosinone	1–2	Sassuolo	Frosinone
15:00 CET	Oyono 24'; Bracaglia (yellow card) 81'	Report	Ghion (yellow card) 8'; Mulattieri 37'; Edoardo Pieragnolo (yellow card) 43'; Thorstvedt (yellow card) 54'; Boloca (yellow card) 63'; Moro 73'	Stadium: Stadio Benito Stirpe; Attendance: 9,740; Referee: (Italy) Davide Massa

21 December 2024 18	Sassuolo	2–1	Palermo	Reggio Emilia
15:00 CET	Laurienté 9'; Pierini 70'	Report	Le Douaron 21'; Baniya (yellow card) 82'; Nikolaou (yellow card) 84'	Stadium: Mapei Stadium – Città del Tricolore; Attendance: 4,744; Referee: (Italy) Giovanni Ayroldi

26 December 2024 19	Pisa	3–1	Sassuolo	Pisa
12:30 CET	Caracciolo (yellow card) 16'; Tramoni 24' 61'; Touré 33'	Report	Doig (yellow card) 58'; Berardi (yellow card) 64'; Pierini 70'; Muharemović (yellow card) 80'	Stadium: Arena Garibaldi – Stadio Romeo Anconetani; Attendance: 9,300; Referee: (Italy) Rosario Abisso

29 December 2024 20	Sassuolo	2–1	Cosenza	Reggio Emilia
15:00 CET	Toljan (yellow card) 77'; Moro 86'; Lipani 90'	Report	Venturi 60' (yellow card) 90+6'; Zilli (yellow card) 68'; Charlys Matheus Lima Pontes (yellow card) 85'	Stadium: Mapei Stadium – Città del Tricolore; Attendance: 4,521; Referee: (Italy) Alberto Santoro

12 January 2025 21	Salernitana	1–2	Sassuolo	Salerno
12:30 CET	Amatucci (yellow card) 22'; Ghiglione (yellow card) 30'; Cerri 47'; Ferrari (yellow card) 90+1'; Tello (red card) 90+1'	Report	Flavio Russo 6' (yellow card) 30'; Muharemović 40'	Stadium: Stadio Arechi; Attendance: 7,463; Referee: (Italy) Antonio Rapuano

19 January 2025 22	Sassuolo	5–3	Südtirol	Reggio Emilia
15:00 CET	Berardi 9'; Doig 55'; Boloca 58'; Laurienté 69'; Moldovan (yellow card) 90'; Volpato 90+2'	Report	Odogwu 3' (yellow card) 51'; Veseli (yellow card) 7'; Pyyhtiä 11' (yellow card) 35'; Merkaj (yellow card) 43'; Nicola Pietrangeli 64'; Mallamo (yellow card) 82'	Stadium: Mapei Stadium – Città del Tricolore; Attendance: 3,802; Referee: (Italy) Mario Perri

24 January 2025 23	Spezia	2–1	Sassuolo	La Spezia
20:30 CET	Vignali 8' 75'; Elia (yellow card) 12'; Di Serio (yellow card) 40'; Esposito (yellow card) 72'; Matějů (yellow card) 85'	Report	Mulattieri 35'; Muharemović (yellow card) 40'; Thorstvedt (yellow card) 81'	Stadium: Stadio Alberto Picco; Attendance: 10,112; Referee: (Italy) Marco Piccinini

1 February 2025 24	Sassuolo	2–0	Juve Stabia	Reggio Emilia
15:00 CET	Laurienté 45'; Mulattieri 71'; Boloca (yellow card) 75'; Muharemović (yellow card) 84'	Report	Buglio (yellow card) 26'; Maistro (yellow card) 65'	Stadium: Mapei Stadium – Città del Tricolore; Attendance: 4,541; Referee: (Italy) Maria Sole Ferrieri Caputi

8 February 2025 25	Mantova	0–3	Sassuolo	Mantova
15:00 CET	Burrai (yellow card) 81'	Report	Laurienté 19' 54'; Iannoni (yellow card) 39'; Paz (yellow card) 52'; Pedro Obiang (yellow card) 90+1'; Pierini 90+5'	Stadium: Stadio Danilo Martelli; Attendance: 7,146; Referee: (Italy) Daniele Perenzoni

15 February 2025 26	Sassuolo	2–0	Brescia	Reggio Emilia
15:00 CET	Lovato 34'; Toljan (yellow card) 41'; Laurienté 73'; Pedro Obiang (yellow card) 90'	Report	Dickmann (yellow card) 43'; Verreth (yellow card) 75'	Stadium: Mapei Stadium – Città del Tricolore; Attendance: 3,918; Referee: (Italy) Paride Tremolada

21 February 2025 27	Sampdoria	0–0	Sassuolo	Genoa
20:30 CET	Altare (yellow card) 3'; Riccio (yellow card) 15'; Curto (yellow card) 53'; Sibilli (yellow card) 64'; Meulensteen (yellow card) 67'	Report	Doig (yellow card) 44'; Berardi (yellow card) 66'; Lovato (yellow card) 73'	Stadium: Stadio Luigi Ferraris; Attendance: 21,395; Referee: (Italy) Luca Pairetto

1 March 2025 28	Sassuolo	1–0	Pisa	Reggio Emilia
17:15 CET	Mazzitelli (yellow card) 19'; Moro 23'	Report		Stadium: Mapei Stadium – Città del Tricolore; Attendance: 11,241; Referee: (Italy) Davide Ghersini

9 March 2025 29	Sassuolo	1–1	Bari	Reggio Emilia
15:00 CET	Laurienté (yellow card) 56'; Volpato 82' (yellow card) 86'	Report	Lasagna 37'; Ahmad Benali (yellow card) 45'; Saco (yellow card) 76'; Maita (yellow card) 82'; Tripaldelli (yellow card) 87'	Stadium: Mapei Stadium – Città del Tricolore; Attendance: 5,970; Referee: (Italy) Federico Dionisi

15 March 2025 30	Cittadella	1–2	Sassuolo	Cittadella
15:00 CET	Salvi (yellow card) 54'; Tronchin (yellow card) 82' (goal) 90'; Pavan (yellow card) 90+1'	Report	Mulattieri 15'; Berardi 46'; Doig (yellow card) 51'; Moro (yellow card) 90+6'	Stadium: Stadio Pier Cesare Tombolato; Attendance: 3,649; Referee: (Italy) Marco Monaldi

29 March 2025 31	Sassuolo	5–1	Reggiana	Reggio Emilia
19:30 CET	Mulattieri 15'; Reinhart 18' (o.g.); Laurienté 35'; Boloca 38'; Ghion (yellow card) 44'; Edoardo Pieragnolo (yellow card) 57'; Verdi 86' (pen.)	Report	Antonio Vergara 3' (yellow card) 41'; Reinhart (yellow card) 22'; Girma (yellow card) 82'	Stadium: Mapei Stadium – Città del Tricolore; Attendance: 5,058; Referee: (Italy) Federico La Penna

6 April 2025 32	Palermo	5–3	Sassuolo	Palermo
15:00 CET	Pohjanpalo 18' 45+1' 81'; Toljan 25' (o.g.); Magnani (yellow card) 48'; Segre 55' (yellow card) 76'	Report	Laurienté (yellow card) 15'; Toljan (yellow card) 61'; Pierini 73'; Moro 74'; Pedro Obiang 84'	Stadium: Stadio Renzo Barbera; Attendance: 18,752; Referee: (Italy) Fabio Maresca

12 April 2025 33	Modena	1 – 3	Sassuolo	Modena
19:30 CET	60' Santoro	Report	Berardi 36'; Laurienté 64'; Moro 76'	Stadium: Stadio Alberto Braglia; Attendance: 13,340; Referee: (Italy) Alberto Santoro

=== Coppa Italia ===
9 August 2024 First Round	Sassuolo	2–1	Cittadella	Reggio Emilia
18:00 CET	Mulattieri 45'; Laurienté 58'	Report	Baldini 48'	Stadium: Mapei Stadium – Città del Tricolore; Attendance: 2,000; Referee: (Italy) Alessandro Prontera

24 September 2024 Second Round	Lecce	0–2	Sassuolo	Lecce
16:00 CET		Report	Muharemović 13'; Volpato (yellow card) 19'; Doig (yellow card) 54'; Lipani (yellow card) 64'; D'Andrea 79' (yellow card) 80'	Stadium: Stadio Via del mare Attendance: 13,951; Referee: (Italy) Daniele Perenzoni

3 December 2024 Round of 16	AC Milan	6–1	Sassuolo	Milan
21:00 CET	Chukwueze 12' 21'; Reijnders 17'; Rafael Leão 23'; Calabria 56'; Abraham 62'; Terracciano (yellow card) 80'	Report	Paz (yellow card) 39'; Mulattieri 59'; Odenthal (yellow card) 64'	Stadium: San Siro; Attendance: 31,392; Referee: (Italy) Kevin Bonacina
