= 2023–24 US Sassuolo Calcio season =

US Sassuolo Calcio
2023–24 season
- Owner: Mapei
- Chairman: Carlo Rossi
- Head coach: Alessio Dionisi (until 25 February); Emiliano Bigica (caretaker, 25 February–1 March); Davide Ballardini (from 1 March)
- Stadium: Mapei Stadium – Città del Tricolore
- Serie A: 19th (relegated)
- Coppa Italia: Round of 16
- Top goalscorer: League: Andrea Pinamonti (11); All: Andrea Pinamonti (12)
Home colours	Away colours	Third colours

The 2023–24 season was US Sassuolo Calcio's 104th season in existence and eleventh consecutive season in Serie A. They also competed in the Coppa Italia.

In the team's 26th match, they dropped to 17th place with only one win in twelve matches, leading to the dismissal of manager Alessio Dionisi.

== Players ==
=== First-team squad ===
As of 1 February 2024

Note: Flags indicate national team as defined under FIFA eligibility rules; some limited exceptions apply. Players may hold more than one non-FIFA nationality.

No.	Pos.	Nation	Player
2	DF	ITA	Filippo Missori
3	DF	NOR	Marcus Pedersen (on loan from Feyenoord)
5	DF	CRO	Martin Erlić (4th captain)
6	MF	SRB	Uroš Račić
7	MF	BRA	Matheus Henrique
8	FW	ITA	Samuele Mulattieri
9	FW	ITA	Andrea Pinamonti
10	FW	ITA	Domenico Berardi (vice-captain)
11	MF	ALB	Nedim Bajrami
13	DF	ITA	Gian Marco Ferrari (captain)
14	MF	GEQ	Pedro Obiang
15	FW	NOR	Emil Konradsen Ceide
19	DF	ALB	Marash Kumbulla (on loan from Roma)
20	FW	ESP	Samu Castillejo (on loan from Valencia)

No.	Pos.	Nation	Player
21	DF	ITA	Mattia Viti (on loan from Nice)
22	DF	GER	Jeremy Toljan
23	FW	AUS	Cristian Volpato
24	MF	ITA	Daniel Boloca
25	GK	ITA	Gianluca Pegolo
28	GK	ITA	Alessio Cragno (on loan from Monza)
35	MF	ITA	Luca Lipani
42	MF	NOR	Kristian Thorstvedt
43	DF	SCO	Josh Doig
44	DF	BRA	Ruan Tressoldi
45	FW	FRA	Armand Laurienté
47	GK	ITA	Andrea Consigli (3rd captain)
92	FW	FRA	Grégoire Defrel

=== Out on loan ===
As of 3 February 2024.

Note: Flags indicate national team as defined under FIFA eligibility rules; some limited exceptions apply. Players may hold more than one non-FIFA nationality.

No.	Pos.	Nation	Player
—	GK	ITA	Alessandro Russo (on loan to Trento until 30 June 2024)
—	GK	ITA	Giacomo Satalino (on loan to Reggiana until 30 June 2024)
—	GK	ITA	Stefano Turati (on loan to Frosinone until 30 June 2024)
—	GK	ITA	Gioele Zacchi (on loan to Giana Erminio until 30 June 2024)
—	DF	NED	Ryan Flamingo (on loan to Utrecht until 30 June 2024)
—	DF	GRE	Giorgos Kyriakopoulos (on loan to Monza until 30 June 2024)
—	DF	ITA	Kevin Miranda (on loan to Catanzaro until 30 June 2024)
—	DF	ITA	Stefano Piccinini (on loan to Pergolettese until 30 June 2024)
—	DF	ITA	Edoardo Pieragnolo (on loan to Reggiana until 30 June 2024)
—	DF	ITA	Filippo Romagna (on loan to Reggiana until 30 June 2024)
—	MF	ITA	Davide Frattesi (on loan to Inter until 30 June 2024)
—	MF	ITA	Andrea Ghion (on loan to Catanzaro until 30 June 2024)
—	MF	FRA	Maxime Lopez (on loan to Fiorentina until 30 June 2024)

No.	Pos.	Nation	Player
—	MF	ROU	Andrei Mărginean (on loan to Novara until 30 June 2024)
—	MF	ITA	Alessandro Mercati (on loan to Gubbio until 30 June 2024)
—	MF	COL	Yeferson Paz (at Perugia until 30 June 2024)
—	MF	ITA	Matteo Saccani (on loan to Turris until 30 June 2024)
—	FW	URU	Agustín Álvarez (on loan to Sampdoria until 30 June 2024)
—	FW	FRA	Janis Antiste (on loan to Reggiana until 30 June 2024)
—	FW	ITA	Riccardo Ciervo (on loan to Südtirol until 30 June 2024)
—	FW	ITA	Luca D'Andrea (on loan to Catanzaro until 30 June 2024)
—	FW	ITA	Giacomo Manzari (on loan to Feralpisalò until 30 June 2024)
—	FW	ITA	Luca Moro (on loan to Spezia until 30 June 2024)
—	FW	ITA	Jacopo Pellegrini (on loan to Vicenza until 30 June 2024)
—	FW	ITA	Luigi Samele (on loan to Alessandria until 30 June 2024)

== Transfers ==
=== In ===
Pos.	Player	Transferred from	Fee	Date	Source
MF	(Albania) Nedim Bajrami	(Italy) Empoli	€6,000,000	1 July 2023	
MF	(Italy) Cristian Volpato	(Italy) Roma	7,500,000	1 July 2023	
DF	(Italy) Filippo Missori	(Italy) Roma U19	2,500,000	1 July 2023	
FW	(Italy) Andrea Pinamonti	(Italy) Internazionale	€20,000,000	1 July 2023	
FW	(Italy) Samuele Mulattieri	(Italy) Internazionale	€6,000,000	7 July 2023	
MF	(Romania) Daniel Boloca	(Italy) Frosinone	Undisclosed	13 July 2023	
GK	(Italy) Alessio Cragno	(Italy) Monza	Loan	15 July 2023	
MF	(Italy) Luca Lipani	(Italy) Genoa	€8,000,000	8 August 2023	
MF	(Serbia) Uroš Račić	(Spain) Valencia	€2,500,000	15 August 2023	
DF	(Norway) Marcus Holmgren Pedersen	(Netherlands) Feyenoord	Loan	22 August 2023	
FW	(Spain) Samu Castillejo	(Spain) Valencia	Loan	1 September 2023	
DF	(Albania) Marash Kumbulla	(Italy) Roma	Loan	1 February 2024	

=== Out ===
Pos.	Player	Transferred to	Fee	Date	Source
DF	(Turkey) Kaan Ayhan	(Turkey) Galatasaray	€2,800,000	1 July 2023	
DF	(Italy) Riccardo Marchizza	(Italy) Frosinone	Undisclosed	13 July 2023	
MF	(Morocco) Abdou Harroui	(Italy) Frosinone	Undisclosed	13 July 2023	
MF	(Romania) Andrei Mărginean	(Italy) Ternana	Loan	12 August 2023	
DF	(Netherlands) Ryan Flamingo	(Netherlands) FC Utrecht	Loan	18 August 2023	
GK	(Italy) Matteo Campani	(Italy) Pisa	Free	24 August 2023	
FW	(Italy) Jacopo Pellegrini	(Italy) Vicenza	Loan	24 August 2023	
FW	(France) Janis Antiste	(Italy) Reggiana	Loan	1 September 2023	
MF	(France) Maxime Lopez	(Italy) Fiorentina	Loan	1 September 2023	

Notes
1.Exercised buy option.

== Pre-season and friendlies ==
Win Draw Loss

15 July 2023 Friendly	Sassuolo (Italy)	22–0	(Italy) Real Vicenza	Vipiteno
17:30 UTC+2	Pinamonti 2', 11', 41'; Antiste 20', 30', 44'; Berardi 23', 28' (pen.); Kyriakopoulos 36'; Matheus Henrique 45'; Bajrami 47', 64', 79'; Thorstvedt 51', 54', 83', 90'; Mulattieri 56', 58', 73', 85', 88'	Report		Stadium: Città di Vipiteno; Referee: Pandini

19 July 2023 Friendly	Sassuolo (Italy)	2–1	(Cyprus) Pafos	Bruneck, Italy
17:00 UTC+2	Beradi 26'; Defrel 89'	Report	Valakari 14'	Stadium: Campo da calcio Stegona; Referee: Daniele Chiffi (Italy)

23 July 2023 Friendly	Sassuolo (Italy)	2–3	(Italy) Spezia	Sterzing
17:00 UTC+2	Matheus Henrique 38'; Defrel 61'	Report	Amian 7'; Reca 29'; Krollis 53'	Referee: Minelli
Note: Match was played in three 35-minute periods.

27 July 2023 Friendly	Sassuolo (Italy)	4–0	(Italy) Südtirol	Sterzing
17:00 UTC+1	Matheus Henrique 13'; Erlić 24'; Defrel 57', 83'	Report		Stadium: Centro Sportivo di Vipiteno; Referee: Alessandro Prontera

2 August 2023 Friendly	Parma (Italy)	1–0	(Italy) Sassuolo	Parma
20:30 UTC+2	Hainaut 68'	Report		Stadium: Stadio Ennio Tardini; Referee: Paride Tremolada

5 August 2023 Friendly	VfL Wolfsburg (Germany)	1–1	(Italy) Sassuolo	Wolfsburg, Germany
15:00 UTC+2	Wind 27'		Bajrami 42'	Stadium: VfL-Stadion am Elsterweg

9 September 2023 Friendly	Sassuolo (Italy)	0–2	(Italy) Feralpisalò	Sassuolo
	Boloca (yellow card) 35'; Falasca (yellow card) 52'	Report	Compagnon 83'; Gjyla 90'	Stadium: Stadio Enzo Ricci; Referee: Marco Monaldi

24 January 2024 Friendly	Sassuolo (Italy)	5–1	(Italy) Virtus Verona	campo del Monza
15:00 UTC+1	Matheus Henrique 44'; Volpato 55' (pen.); Mulattieri 64', 88', 90'	Report	Begheldo 42'	Referee: Francesco Passarotti

== Competitions ==
=== Overall record ===
Competition	First match	Last match	Starting round	Final position	Record							
Competition	First match	Last match	Starting round	Final position	Pld	W	D	L	GF	GA	GD	Win %
Serie A	20 August 2023	26 May 2024	Matchday 1	19th	38	7	9	22	43	75	−32	18.42
Coppa Italia	13 August 2023	3 January 2024	Round of 64	Round of 16	3	1	1	1	6	5	+1	33.33
Total					41	8	10	23	49	80	−31	19.51

Source: Soccerway

=== Serie A ===
==== League table ====
Pos	Team	Pld	W	D	L	GF	GA	GD	Pts	Qualification or relegation
16	Cagliari	38	8	12	18	42	68	−26	36 (Note: Cagliari finished ahead of Empoli on head-to-head points: Cagliari 0–0 Empoli, Empoli 0–1 Cagliari.)	
17	Empoli	38	9	9	20	29	54	−25	36	
18	Frosinone (R)	38	8	11	19	44	69	−25	35	Relegation to Serie B
19	Sassuolo (R)	38	7	9	22	43	75	−32	30	Relegation to Serie B
20	Salernitana (R)	38	2	11	25	32	81	−49	17	Relegation to Serie B

Source: Serie A
Rules for classification: 1) Points; 2) Tiebreaker for Champions team and third relegated team; 3) Head-to-head points; 4) Head-to-head goal difference; 5) Goal difference; 6) Goals scored; 7) Draw.
(Note: Head-to-head record is used only after all the matches between the teams in question have been played)
(R) Relegated

==== Results summary ====
Overall								Home						Away					
Pld	W	D	L	GF	GA	GD	Pts	W	D	L	GF	GA	GD	W	D	L	GF	GA	GD
38	7	9	22	43	75	−32	30	5	5	9	23	34	−11	2	4	13	20	41	−21

Source: Serie A

==== Results by round ====
Round	1	2	3	4	5	6	7	8	9	10	11	12	13	14	15	16	17	18	19	20	21	22	23	24	25	26	27	28	29	30	31	32	33	34	35	36	37	38
Ground	H	A	H	A	H	A	H	A	H	H	A	H	A	H	A	A	H	A	H	A	H	A	A	H	A	H	A	H	A	H	A	H	H	A	H	A	H	A
Result	L	L	W	L	W	W	L	D	L	D	L	D	W	L	L	D	L	L	W	L	L	L	L	D	L	L	L	W	L	D	D	D	L	L	W	L	L	D
Position	18	20	13	17	12	9	11	12	13	15	15	15	14	15	15	15	15	16	14	14	15	15	15	17	17	17	19	19	19	19	19	19	19	19	19	19	19	19

Source: Serie A
A = Away; H = Home; W = Win; D = Draw; L = Loss

==== Matches ====
The league fixtures were unveiled on 5 July 2023.

20 August 2023 1	Sassuolo	0–2	Atalanta	Reggio Emilia
18:30 CEST (UTC+2)		Report	De Ketelaere 83'; Zortea 90+3'	Stadium: Mapei Stadium – Città del Tricolore; Attendance: 12,298; Referee: Matteo Marchetti

27 August 2023 2	Napoli	2–0	Sassuolo	Naples
20:45 CEST (UTC+2)	Osimhen 16' (pen.); Raspadori (penalty missed) 60'; Di Lorenzo 64'	Report	Ruan (yellow card) 30'; Lopez (red card) 51'	Stadium: Stadio Diego Armando Maradona; Attendance: 46,925; Referee: Antonio Giua

1 September 2023 3	Sassuolo	3–1	Hellas Verona	Reggio Emilia
18:30 CEST (UTC+2)	Pinamonti 11'; Boloca (yellow card) 29'; Berardi 63', 73' (pen.)	Report	Coppola (yellow card) 42'; Magnani (yellow card) 45+5'; Ngonge 56'; Doig (yellow card) 71'	Stadium: Mapei Stadium – Città del Tricolore; Attendance: 10,356; Referee: Marco Piccinini

17 September 2023 4	Frosinone	4–2	Sassuolo	Frosinone
15:00 CEST (UTC+2)	Romagnoli (yellow card) 34'; Cheddira 45+4' (pen.); Barrenechea (yellow card) 55'; Mazzitelli 70', 76'; Caso (yellow card) 80'; Gelli (yellow card) 82'; Lirola 90+6'	Report	Pinamonti 7', 24'; Ruan (yellow card) 45+4'; Erlić (yellow card) 80'	Stadium: Stadio Benito Stirpe; Attendance: 13,133; Referee: Alessandro Prontera

23 September 2023 5	Sassuolo	4–2	Juventus	Reggio Emilia
18:00 CEST (UTC+2)	Laurienté 12'; Berardi 41', (yellow card) 58'; Boloca (yellow card) 52'; Viña (yellow card) 64'; Pinamonti 82', (yellow card) 83'; Gatti 90+5' (o.g.)	Report	Viña 21' (o.g.); Rabiot (yellow card) 36'; Danilo (yellow card) 55'; Chiesa 78'	Stadium: Mapei Stadium – Città del Tricolore; Attendance: 20,141; Referee: Andrea Colombo

27 September 2023 6	Internazionale	1–2	Sassuolo	Milan
20:45 CEST (UTC+2)	Dumfries 45+1'	Report	Bajrami 54'; Berardi 63'; Matheus Henrique (yellow card) 74'	Stadium: San Siro; Attendance: 70,864; Referee: Luca Massimi

2 October 2023 7	Sassuolo	0–1	Monza	Reggio Emilia
18:30 CEST (UTC+2)		Report	Colombo 66'	Stadium: Mapei Stadium – Città del Tricolore; Attendance: 10,165; Referee: Luca Zufferli

6 October 2023 8	Lecce	1–1	Sassuolo	Lecce
20:45 CEST (UTC+2)	Rafia (yellow card) 44'; Krstović 48', (yellow card) 72'	Report	Boloca (yellow card) 1'; Berardi 22' (pen.); Pedersen (yellow card) 43'; Ferrari (yellow card) 80'	Stadium: Stadio Via del mare Attendance: 26,160; Referee: Juan Luca Sacchi

21 October 2023 9	Sassuolo	0–2	Lazio	Reggio Emilia
20:45 CEST (UTC+2)	Pedersen (yellow card) 31'	Report	Felipe Anderson 28'; Rovella (yellow card) 32'; Pedro (yellow card) 44'; Luis Alberto 35', (yellow card) 75'; Immobile (yellow card) 63'; Cataldi (yellow card) 77'	Stadium: Mapei Stadium – Città del Tricolore; Attendance: 15,597; Referee: Marco Di Bello

28 October 2023 10	Sassuolo	1–1	Bologna	Reggio Emilia
15:00 CEST (UTC+2)	Boloca 44'; Berardi (yellow card) 90'	Report	Zirkzee 3'; Lykogiannis (yellow card) 58'; El Azzouzi (yellow card) 71'; Saelemaekers (yellow card) 90+5'	Stadium: Mapei Stadium – Città del Tricolore; Attendance: 16,931; Referee: Antonio Giua

6 November 2023 11	Torino	2–1	Sassuolo	Turin
20:45 CET (UTC+1)	Sanabria 5', (yellow card) 54'; Vlašić 68'	Report	Thorstvedt 18'; Berardi (yellow card) 86'	Stadium: Stadio Olimpico Grande Torino; Attendance: 18,000; Referee: Maria Sole Ferrieri Caputi

10 November 2023 12	Sassuolo	2–2	Salernitana	Reggio Emilia
18:30 CET (UTC+1)	Thorstvedt 36', 52', (yellow card) 80'; Toljan (yellow card) 71'	Report	Ikwuemesi 5', (yellow card) 45'; Dia 17'	Stadium: Mapei Stadium – Città del Tricolore; Attendance: 10,495; Referee: Davide Ghersini

26 November 2023 13	Empoli	3–4	Sassuolo	Empoli
15:00 CET (UTC+1)	Caputo 4' (pen.); Fazzini (yellow card) 25', (goal) 30'; Maleh (yellow card) 31'; Viña 86' (o.g.); Gyasi (yellow card) 90+1'; Grassi (yellow card) 90+2'	Report	Pinamonti 12'; Matheus Henrique 22', (yellow card) 37'; Berardi (yellow card) 50', (goal) 66' (pen.), 90+2'	Stadium: Stadio Carlo Castellani; Attendance: 9,954; Referee: Simone Sozza

3 December 2023 14	Sassuolo	1–2	Roma	Reggio Emilia
18:00 CET (UTC+1)	Matheus Henrique 32', (yellow card) 83'; Thorstvedt (yellow card) 56'; Boloca (red card) 63'; Berardi (yellow card) 69'; Erlić (yellow card) 90+3'	Report	Dybala 76' (pen.); Kristensen (yellow card) 78', (goal) 82'	Stadium: Mapei Stadium – Città del Tricolore; Attendance: 19,113; Referee: Matteo Marcenaro

11 December 2023 15	Cagliari	2–1	Sassuolo	Cagliari
20:45 CET (UTC+1)	Goldaniga (yellow card) 55'; Lapadula 90+4'; Pavoletti 90+9'	Report	Erlić 7', (yellow card) 43'; Laurienté (yellow card) 9'; Ruan (yellow card) 35' (yellow-red card) 62'; Consigli (yellow card) 69'; Thorstvedt (yellow card) 90+3'; Mulattieri (yellow card) 90+5'	Stadium: Unipol Domus; Attendance: 15,769; Referee: Maurizio Mariani

17 December 2023 16	Udinese	2–2	Sassuolo	Udine
15:00 CET (UTC+1)	Lucca 36'; Pereyra 55', (yellow card) 90+3'; Payero (red card) 59'; Ebosele (yellow card) 77'; Masina (yellow card) 90'	Report	Pedersen (yellow card) 20'; Berardi 75' (pen.), 88' (pen.)	Stadium: Stadio Friuli; Attendance: 20,490; Referee: Gianluca Manganiello

22 December 2023 17	Sassuolo	1–2	Genoa	Reggio Emilia
18:30 CET (UTC+1)	Laurienté (yellow card) 22'; Pinamonti 28'; Ferrari (yellow card) 39'	Report	Bani (yellow card) 13'; Guðmundsson 64' (pen.); Ekuban 87'	Stadium: Mapei Stadium – Città del Tricolore; Attendance: 11,745; Referee: Marco Guida

30 December 2023 18	Milan	1–0	Sassuolo	Milan
18:00 CET (UTC+1)	Pulisic 59'	Report	Castillejo (yellow card) 88'	Stadium: San Siro; Attendance: 70,385; Referee: Livio Marinelli

6 January 2024 19	Sassuolo	1–0	Fiorentina	Reggio Emilia
20:45 CET (UTC+1)	Pinamonti 9', (yellow card) 52'; Matheus Henrique (yellow card) 34'; Berardi (yellow card) 69'	Report	Martínez Quarta (yellow card) 35'; Bonaventura (penalty missed) 64'; Ikoné (yellow card) 90+6'	Stadium: Mapei Stadium – Città del Tricolore; Attendance: 15,759; Referee: Rosario Abisso

16 January 2024 20	Juventus	3–0	Sassuolo	Turin
20:45 CET (UTC+1)	Vlahović 15', 37'; Chiesa 89'	Report	Erlić (yellow card) 42'; Ferrari (yellow card) 64'	Stadium: Juventus Stadium; Attendance: 39,005; Referee: Marco Piccinini

28 January 2024 22	Monza	1–0	Sassuolo	Monza
15:00 CET (UTC+1)	Colpani 31'; Akpa Akpro (yellow card) 42'	Report	Matheus Henrique (yellow card) 43'; Pedersen (yellow card) 68'; Ruan (yellow card) 90+8'	Stadium: Stadio Brianteo; Attendance: 9,882; Referee: Gianluca Manganiello

3 February 2024 23	Bologna	4–2	Sassuolo	Bologna
20:45 CET (UTC+1)	Viti 24' (o.g.); Aebischer (yellow card) 55'; Fabbian 73'; Ferguson 83'; Saelemaekers 86'	Report	Thorstvedt 13', (yellow card) 45+1'; Volpato 34'; Boloca (yellow card) 85'; Doig (yellow card) 90+3'	Stadium: Stadio Renato Dall'Ara; Attendance: 20,932; Referee: Juan Luca Sacchi

10 February 2024 24	Sassuolo	1–1	Torino	Reggio Emilia
20:45 CET (UTC+1)	Pinamonti 5'; Doig (yellow card) 33'	Report	Zapata 9'; Lovato (yellow card) 66'; Tameze (yellow card) 82'; Vlašić (yellow card) 90'	Stadium: Mapei Stadium – Città del Tricolore; Attendance: 10,955; Referee: Daniele Orsato

17 February 2024 25	Atalanta	3–0	Sassuolo	Bergamo
20:45 CET (UTC+1)	Pašalić 22'; Koopmeiners 58'; Bakker 75'	Report	Pinamonti (penalty missed) 45+5'	Stadium: Gewiss Stadium; Attendance: 14,474; Referee: Alessandro Prontera

24 February 2024 26	Sassuolo	2–3	Empoli	Reggio Emilia
15:00 CET (UTC+1)	Boloca (yellow card) 10'; Pinamonti 54' (pen.); Ferrari 77'	Report	Luperto 11'; Ismajli (yellow card) 54'; Cancellieri (yellow card) 56'; Niang 64' (pen.); Bastoni 90+4', (yellow card) 90+5'	Stadium: Mapei Stadium – Città del Tricolore; Attendance: 12,774; Referee: Gianluca Aureliano

28 February 2024 21	Sassuolo	1–6	Napoli	Reggio Emilia
18:00 CET (UTC+1)	Račić 17'	Report	Rrahmani 29'; Osimhen 31', 41', 47'; Kvaratskhelia 51', 75'	Stadium: Mapei Stadium – Città del Tricolore; Attendance: 17,085; Referee: Daniele Chiffi
Note: The match was originally scheduled for 21 January 2024, but was postponed due to Napoli's participation in the 2023 Supercoppa Italiana.

3 March 2024 27	Hellas Verona	1–0	Sassuolo	Verona
12:30 CET (UTC+1)	Dawidowicz (yellow card) 51'; Świderski 79'; Cabal (yellow card) 81'; Serdar (yellow card) 83'; Coppola (yellow card) 89'	Report	Matheus Henrique (yellow card) 47'; Castillejo (yellow card) 72'	Stadium: Stadio Marcantonio Bentegodi; Attendance: 19,338; Referee: Fabio Maresca

9 March 2024 28	Sassuolo	1–0	Frosinone	Reggio Emilia
15:00 CET (UTC+1)	Thorstvedt (yellow card) 23', (goal) 58'; Doig (yellow card) 32'; Laurienté (yellow card) 73'	Report	Ghedjemis (yellow card) 50'; Kaio (penalty missed) 90'	Stadium: Mapei Stadium – Città del Tricolore; Attendance: 11,189; Referee: Federico La Penna

17 March 2024 29	Roma	1–0	Sassuolo	Rome
18:00 CET (UTC+1)	Pellegrini 50', (yellow card) 59'; Azmoun (yellow card) 89'	Report	Erlić (yellow card) 90'	Stadium: Stadio Olimpico; Attendance: 66,871; Referee: Gianluca Manganiello

1 April 2024 30	Sassuolo	1–1	Udinese	Reggio Emilia
15:00 CEST (UTC+2)	Doig (yellow card) 40'; Defrel 41'	Report	Lucca (yellow card) 16'; Bijol (yellow card) 25'; Thauvin 44'	Stadium: Mapei Stadium – Città del Tricolore; Attendance: 11,512; Referee: Michael Fabbri

5 April 2024 31	Salernitana	2–2	Sassuolo	Salerno
20:45 CEST (UTC+2)	Pierozzi (yellow card) 27'; Candreva 52' (pen.); Maggiore (yellow card) 62', (goal) 90+1'; Pirola (yellow card) 72'; Vignato (yellow card) 90+7'	Report	Laurienté 37', (yellow card) 67'; Bajrami 44'; Kumbulla (yellow card) 82'; Račić (yellow card) 90+3'	Stadium: Stadio Arechi; Attendance: 14,306; Referee: Simone Sozza

14 April 2024 32	Sassuolo	3–3	Milan	Reggio Emilia
15:00 CEST (UTC+2)	Pinamonti 4', (yellow card) 69'; Laurienté 10', 53'; Ferrari (yellow card) 19'; Ruan (yellow card) 57'	Report	Leão 20'; Jović 59'; Thiaw (yellow card) 69'; Okafor 84'	Stadium: Mapei Stadium – Città del Tricolore; Attendance: 19,199; Referee: Davide Massa

21 April 2024 33	Sassuolo	0–3	Lecce	Reggio Emilia
12:30 CEST (UTC+2)	Laurienté (yellow card) 19'	Report	Gendrey 11'; Dorgu 15'; Piccoli 61'	Stadium: Mapei Stadium – Città del Tricolore; Attendance: 16,210; Referee: Daniele Doveri

28 April 2024 34	Fiorentina	5–1	Sassuolo	Florence
20:45 CEST (UTC+2)	Sottil 17'; Martínez Quarta (yellow card) 32', (goal) 54'; González 58', 66'; Barák 62'; Comuzzo (yellow card) 80'	Report	Ruan (yellow card) 13'; Thorstvedt 57', (yellow card) 67'	Stadium: Stadio Artemio Franchi; Attendance: 22,575; Referee: Matteo Marcenaro

4 May 2024 35	Sassuolo	1–0	Internazionale	Reggio Emilia
20:45 CEST (UTC+2)	Laurienté 20'; Boloca (yellow card) 90'	Report	Pavard (yellow card) 89'	Stadium: Mapei Stadium – Città del Tricolore; Attendance: 19,454; Referee: Matteo Marchetti

12 May 2024 36	Genoa	2–1	Sassuolo	Genoa
15:00 CEST (UTC+2)	Thorsby (yellow card) 48'; Badelj 56'; Kumbulla 63' (o.g.)	Report	Pinamonti 31' (pen.); Obiang (yellow card) 50'; Doig (yellow card) 75'	Stadium: Stadio Luigi Ferraris; Attendance: 31,412; Referee: Maurizio Mariani

19 May 2024 37	Sassuolo	0–2	Cagliari	Reggio Emilia
12:30 CEST (UTC+2)	Thorstvedt (yellow card) 54'; Pinamonti (yellow card) 79'; Matheus Henrique (yellow card) 90+3' (yellow-red card) 90+3'	Report	Deiola (yellow card) 61'; Prati 71'; Dossena (yellow card) 76'; Lapadula 90+1' (pen.)	Stadium: Mapei Stadium – Città del Tricolore; Attendance: 15,548; Referee: Daniele Doveri

26 May 2024 38	Lazio	1–1	Sassuolo	Rome
20:45 CEST (UTC+2)	Zaccagni 60', (yellow card) 88'; Kamada (yellow card) 65'; Guendouzi (yellow card) 82'	Report	Volpato (yellow card) 19'; Viti 66'	Stadium: Stadio Olimpico; Attendance: 56,000; Referee: Paride Tremolada

=== Coppa Italia ===
13 August 2023 Round of 64	Cosenza	2–5 (a.e.t.)	Sassuolo	Cosenza
18:00 CEST (UTC+2)	Tutino 9' (pen.); Zuccon (yellow card) 45+2'; Calò (yellow card) 71' (yellow-red card) 100'; Mazzocchi 90'; Praszelik (yellow card) 102'	Report	Viti (yellow card) 9'; Erlić (yellow card) 37'; Bajrami 45+4'; Pinamonti 79' (pen.); Volpato (yellow card) 88'; Viña (yellow card) 89'; Lopez (yellow card) 101'; Defrel (yellow card) 101'; Ceide 105'; Mulattieri 115', 118'	Stadium: Stadio San Vito-Gigi Marulla; Attendance: 8,800; Referee: Giuseppe Collu

2 November 2023 Round of 32	Sassuolo	0–0 (a.e.t.) (5–4 p)	Spezia	Reggio Emilia
18:00 CET (UTC+1)	Volpato (yellow card) 24'; Berardi (yellow card) 83'; Račić (yellow card) 90+1'	Report	Krollis (yellow card) 35'; Pietra (yellow card) 70'; Candelari (yellow card) 106'; Hristov (yellow card) 107'	Stadium: Mapei Stadium – Città del Tricolore; Attendance: 2,013; Referee: Luca Zufferli
	Penalties
	Berardi (penalty scored); Pinamonti (penalty scored); Bajrami (penalty scored); Thorstvedt (penalty scored); Laurienté (penalty scored)		(penalty scored) Kouda; (penalty missed) Moro; (penalty scored) Candelari; (penalty scored) Nikolaou; (penalty scored) Esposito

3 January 2024 Round of 16	Atalanta	3–1	Sassuolo	Bergamo
18:00 CET (UTC+1)	De Ketelaere 24', 63'; Miranchuk 71'	Report	Ceide (yellow card) 54'; Boloca 90+5'	Stadium: Gewiss Stadium; Attendance: 13,509; Referee: Alberto Santoro
