= Alessandro Russo =

Alessandro Russo may refer to:

- Alessandro Russo (footballer, born 2001), Italian football player, goalkeeper
- Alessandro Russo (footballer, born 2003), Italian football player, midfielder
