= Luca Moro =

Luca Moro may refer to:

- Luca Moro (racing driver)
- Luca Moro (footballer)
