= Josh Doig =

Scottish footballer (born 2002)

Personal information
- Full name: Josh Thomas Doig
- Date of birth: 18 May 2002 (age 24)
- Place of birth: Edinburgh, Scotland
- Height: 6 ft 2 in (1.89 m)
- Positions: Left-back; left wing-back; centre-back

Team information
- Current team: Sassuolo
- Number: 3

Youth career
- Heart of Midlothian
- 2019–2020: Hibernian

Senior career*
Years	Team	Apps	(Gls)
2020–2022	Hibernian	62	(1)
2020	→ Queen's Park (loan)	7	(0)
2022–2024	Hellas Verona	34	(2)
2024–	Sassuolo	78	(2)

International career^{‡}
2019	Scotland U18	1	(0)
2021–2024	Scotland U21	12	(1)
2025–	Scotland	2	(0)
- * Club domestic league appearances and goals as of 09:48, 12 September 2026 (UTC) ‡ National team caps and goals as of 29 September 2026

Josh Thomas Doig (born 18 May 2002) is a Scottish professional footballer who plays as a left-back or left wing-back for Serie A club Sassuolo and the Scotland national team.

== Early life ==
Josh Thomas Doig was born on 18 May 2002 in Edinburgh. He attended Newcraighall Primary School and Portobello High School.

== Club career ==
=== Hibernian ===
Doig was released the youth system in 2019 of Edinburgh club, Hearts. He joined Hibernian in the summer of 2019. At this point, Doig still played as a centre-back. In February 2020, he signed a contract with Hibs to run until the summer of 2023. Hibs announced at the same that Doig was being loaned to League Two club Queen's Park for the rest of the 2019–20 season. It was at Queen's Park when Doig moved from centre-back to left-back.

Doig was added to the Hibs first team squad ahead of the 2020–21 season, and he made his first competitive appearance for the club on 1 August 2020 in a 2–1 win against Kilmarnock. Doig played regularly for Hibs during the 2020–21 season, and in January 2021 it was reported by BBC Sport that English Premier League clubs and Celtic had expressed interest in signing him. Doig scored his first senior goal on 20 February 2021, in a 2–0 win for Hibs against Hamilton. Doig then signed a new contract with Hibs, which was due to expire in the summer of 2025. At the end of his breakthrough season with Hibs, Doig won the SFWA Young Player of the Year award.

Amid transfer speculation, Doig returned to Hibernian's squad starting in his first game back against Ross County where Hibernian won 3–0 on 9 August 2021.

On 20 November 2021, Doig signed a new long-term contract at Hibernian. Hibs accepted an offer of over £3 million for Doig from Italian club Hellas Verona in July 2022.

=== Hellas Verona ===
Doig completed his move to Hellas Verona on 13 July 2022, signing a four-year contract with the Italian side. He later admitted that he wanted to escape the pressures of playing for one of the big two Edinburgh clubs. He made his Serie A debut in a 1–0 loss to Atalanta. Doig provided an assist on his second appearance a week later. He scored a goal on his first start for Verona, a 2–1 win against Sampdoria on 4 September. On 3 October 2022, Doig scored his second goal for Hellas Verona, a volley, later voted one of the best goals of the season in Serie A. He made 22 appearances in Serie A in the 2022–23 season, and recorded two goals and four assists. In the following 2023–24 season, he made twelve Serie A appearances, missing four games through injury.

=== Sassuolo ===
After Hellas Verona refused to allow a transfer to Marseille in France, Doig joined fellow Serie A club Sassuolo on 20 January 2024 for a fee of €6 million, plus €1 million in add-ons, with a 10% sell-on clause in favour of Verona on a future transfer. He was given the number 43 shirt.

On 28 January 2024, Doig made his debut during the 22nd Serie A matchday against AC Monza as a left-back. He provided two assists and played his 50th Serie A match against Lazio in a 1–1 draw at the Stadio Olimpico. Sassuolo were relegated at the end of the 2023–24 season but they won promotion back to Serie A at the first attempt by winning the 2024–25 Serie B.

== International career ==
Doig was selected in a Scotland U18 squad in September 2019, and played in a 2–1 win against Paraguay. The following month, he was selected in the Scotland U19 squad.

In May 2021, after a successful individual season for Doig in which he was named the SFWA Young Player of the Year, he was selected for the Scotland under-21 squad. He was later forced to withdraw through injury.

Doig was added to the full Scotland squad for the first time in September 2022. He was selected for the full squad again in November 2023, following injuries to Andy Robertson and Kieran Tierney. Doig made his debut on 9 June 2025 against Liechtenstein, coming on in the 59th minute to replace Robertson, as Scotland won 4–0. He made his debut at the same time as Andy Irving, who had attended the same schools as Doig.

== Style of play ==
A goal.com profile of Doig in 2021 described him as, "strong in the air and possessing an appetite for tough tackles."

== Career statistics ==
As of match played 6 September 2026

Appearances and goals by club, season and competition
Club	Season	League			National cup (Note: Includes Scottish Cup, Coppa Italia)		League cup (Note: Includes Scottish League Cup)		Europe		Other		Total	
Club	Season	Division	Apps	Goals	Apps	Goals	Apps	Goals	Apps	Goals	Apps	Goals	Apps	Goals
Hibernian Under-20s	2019–20	SPFL Development League	—		—		—		—		1	0	1	0
Queen's Park FC (on loan)	2019–20	Scottish League Two	7	0	—		—		—		—		7	0
Hibernian	2019–20	Scottish Premiership	0	0	1	0	0	0	—		—		1	0
Hibernian	2020–21	Scottish Premiership	28	1	5	0	2	0	—		—		35	1
Hibernian	2021–22	Scottish Premiership	34	0	3	0	3	0	2 (Note: Appearances in the UEFA Conference League)	0	—		42	0
Hibernian	Total		62	1	9	0	5	0	2	0	—		78	1
Hellas Verona	2022–23	Serie A	22	2	0	0	—		—		0	0	22	2
Hellas Verona	2023–24	Serie A	12	0	2	0	—		—		—		14	0
Hellas Verona	Total		34	2	2	0	—		—		0	0	36	2
Sassuolo	2023–24	Serie A	16	0	0	0	—		—		—		16	0
Sassuolo	2024–25	Serie B	29	1	2	0	—		—		—		31	1
Sassuolo	2025–26	Serie A	30	0	1	1	—		—		—		31	1
Sassuolo	2026–27	Serie A	3	1	1	0	—		—		—		4	1
Sassuolo	Total		78	2	4	1	—		—		—		82	3
Career total			181	5	15	1	5	0	2	0	1	0	204	6

=== International ===
As of match played 29 September 2026

Appearances and goals by national team and year
National team	Year	Apps	Goals
Scotland	2025	1	0
Scotland	2026	1	0
Total		2	0

== Honours ==
Hibernian

- Scottish Cup runner-up: 2020–21
- Scottish League Cup runner-up: 2021–22

Sassuolo

- Serie B: 2024–25

Individual

- SPFL Premiership Team of the Season: 2020–21
- SFWA Young Player of the Year: 2020–21
- Hibernian Young Player of the Year: 2020–21
- PFA Scotland Young Player of the Year nominee: 2021–22
- SFWA Young Player of the Year nominee: 2021–22
