= Edoardo Iannoni =

Italian footballer (born 2001)

Personal information
- Date of birth: 11 April 2001 (age 25)
- Place of birth: Rome, Italy
- Height: 1.85 m (6 ft 1 in)
- Position: Midfielder

Team information
- Current team: Hellas Verona
- Number: 44

Youth career
- Roma

Senior career*
Years	Team	Apps	(Gls)
2019–2020	Savio	26	(3)
2019–2020	Trastevere	21	(0)
2020–2024	Salernitana	1	(0)
2021	→ Juve Stabia (loan)	5	(0)
2021–2022	→ Ancona (loan)	36	(2)
2022–2024	→ Perugia (loan)	61	(4)
2024	Perugia	0	(0)
2024–2026	Sassuolo	37	(2)
2026–	Hellas Verona	3	(1)
- * Club domestic league appearances and goals as of 20 September 2026

Edoardo Iannoni (born 11 April 2001) is a professional footballer who plays as a midfielder for Serie B club Hellas Verona.

== Career ==
Iannoni was born in Rome and grew up in the nearby Silvestri, Monteverde. He started his career on Serie D club Trastevere. On 20 June 2020, he signed with Serie B club Salernitana. The midfielder made his Serie B debut on 17 January 2021 against Empoli, as a late substitute.

On 29 January 2021, Iannoni moved to Juve Stabia. On 20 July, he joined Ancona-Matelica on loan. On 30 October, Iannoni scored a goal against Viterbese. On 8 July 2022, he moved on another loan, this time to Perugia. On 12 June 2024, Perugia exercised their option to make the transfer permanent.

On 23 August 2024, Iannoni joined Sassuolo in Serie B. As the club was promoted to Serie A for the following season, he made his league debut in a 3–2 loss against Cremonese on 29 August 2025, replacing Nemanja Matić at the 82th minute. The following month, on 28 September, Iannoni scored his first goal for Sassuolo in a victory against Udinese.

== Honours ==
- Sassuolo: 2024–25 Serie B
