= Nicholas Pierini =

Italian footballer (born 1998)

Personal information
- Date of birth: 6 August 1998 (age 28)
- Place of birth: Parma, Italy
- Height: 1.76 m (5 ft 9 in)
- Position: Forward

Team information
- Current team: Sassuolo
- Number: 77

Youth career
- –2011: Córdoba
- 2011–2015: Parma
- 2015: Empoli
- 2015–2017: Sassuolo

Senior career*
Years	Team	Apps	(Gls)
2017–2021	Sassuolo	3	(0)
2018–2019	→ Spezia (loan)	25	(5)
2019–2020	→ Cosenza (loan)	20	(3)
2020–2021	→ Ascoli (loan)	12	(0)
2021	→ Modena (loan)	10	(3)
2021–2022	Cesena	35	(12)
2022–2024	Venezia	75	(9)
2024–	Sassuolo	42	(10)
2026	→ Sampdoria (loan)	9	(2)

International career
2016	Italy U18	1	(0)
2016–2017	Italy U19	3	(0)
- * Club domestic league appearances and goals as of 13 May 2026

Nicholas Pierini (born 6 August 1998) is an Italian professional footballer who plays as a forward for Serie A club Sassuolo.

== Club career ==
=== Sassuolo ===
On 29 October 2017, Pierini made his professional debut in Serie A for Sassuolo as a substitute replacing Luca Mazzitelli in the 71st minute of a 3–1 away defeat against Napoli. On 20 December he played his first match as a starter in Coppa Italia, a 2–1 away defeat against Atalanta in the round of 16, he was replaced by Diego Falcinelli in the 54th minute.

==== Loan to Spezia ====
On 10 July 2018, Pierini was signed by Serie B side Spezia on a season-long loan deal. On 4 August he made his debut for Spezia and he scored his first professional goal in the 66th minute of a 2–1 home win over Sambenedettese in the second round of Coppa Italia, he was replaced by Luca Vignali after 85 minutes. Three weeks later, on 25 August, he made his Serie B debut for Spezia as a substitute replacing Emmanuel Gyasi in the 64th minute of a 1–0 away defeat against Venezia. One week later, on 1 September, Pierini scored twice in a 3–2 home win over Brescia. On 27 October he played his first entire match for the team, a 0–0 away draw against Padova. Pierini ended his season-long loan with 27 appearances and 6 goals.

==== Loan to Cosenza ====
On 9 August 2019, Pierini was loaned to Serie B side Cosenza on season-long loan deal. On 11 August he made his debut for the club in a 1–0 away defeat against Monopoli in the second round of Coppa Italia, he played the entire match. On 24 August he made his league debut for Cosenza in a 0–0 away draw against Crotone, he was replaced Riccardo Moreo after 74 minutes. One week later he played his first entire match for Cosenza, a 1–0 home defeat against Salernitana. On 24 September, Pierini scored his first goal for Cosenza, as a substitute, in the 94th minute of a 1–1 home draw against Livorno. On 10 November he scored twice in a 2–2 away draw against Trapani. Pierini ended his loan to Cosenza with 21 appearances, 3 goals and 1 assist.

==== Loan to Ascoli and Modena ====
On 5 October 2020, Pierini joined Serie B club Ascoli on loan for the 2020-21 season. On 17 October he made his debut for the club, as a starter in a 1–0 away defeat against Frosinone, he played the entire match. However in January 2021 his loan was interrupted and he returned to Sassuolo leaving Ascoli with 12 appearances, only 5 of them as a starter and one assist.

On 1 February 2021, he moved on a new loan to Serie C club Modena. On the next day, Pierini made his debut for his new club as a substitute replacing Sodinha in the 78th minute of a 1–1 home draw against Triestina. On 21 March he played his first match as a starter for Modena in a 1–0 home win over Cesena, he was replaced by Enrico Bearzotti in the 82nd minute. On 18 April he scored his first goal for the club in the 53rd minute of a 3–0 home win over Padova. One week later, on 25 April, he scored his second goal in the 75th minute of a 3–0 home win over Legnago. Pierini ended his six-month loan to Modena 12 appearances, 3 goals and 3 assists, he also helped the club to reach the play-offs, but Modena was elimininated 2–1 on aggregate against AlbinoLeffe in the round of 16.

=== Cesena ===
On 31 August 2021, he signed a four-year contract with Cesena.

=== Venezia ===
On 13 July 2022, Pierini moved to Venezia on a four-year contract. He contributed to their promotion back to Serie A and played his first top-level games in six years early in the 2024–25 season.

=== Return to Sassuolo ===
On 30 August 2024, Pierini signed with Sassuolo in Serie B.

On 2 February 2026, he was loaned by Sampdoria, with an option to buy.

== Personal life ==
He is a son of former Italy international footballer and current coach Alessandro Pierini.

== Career statistics ==
=== Club ===
As of match played 26 December 2024

Appearances and goals by club, season and competition
Club	Season	League			Cup		Europe		Other		Total	
Club	Season	League	Apps	Goals	Apps	Goals	Apps	Goals	Apps	Goals	Apps	Goals
Sassuolo	2017–18	Serie A	3	0	1	0	—		—		4	0
Spezia (loan)	2018–19	Serie B	25	5	2	1	—		—		27	6
Cosenza (loan)	2019–20	Serie B	20	3	1	0	—		—		21	3
Ascoli (loan)	2020–21	Serie B	12	0	0	0	—		—		12	0
Modena (loan)	2020–21	Serie C	10	3	—		—		2 (Note: All appearance(s) in Serie C play-off.)	0	12	3
Cesena	2021–22	Serie C	35	12	1	1	—		2	1	38	14
Venezia	2022–23	Serie B	35	4	0	0	—		1 (Note: Appearances in Serie B – Promotion play-offs)	1	36	5
Venezia	2023–24	Serie B	38	5	1	0	—		4	1	43	6
Venezia	2024–25	Serie A	2	0	1	0	—		—		3	0
Venezia	Total		75	9	2	0	—		5	2	82	11
Sassuolo	2024–25	Serie B	16	8	1	0	—		—		17	8
Career total			196	40	8	2	—		9	3	213	45

== Honours ==
Sassuolo

- Serie B: 2024–25
