= Domenico Berardi =

Italian footballer (born 1994)

Domenico Berardi Cavaliere OMRI
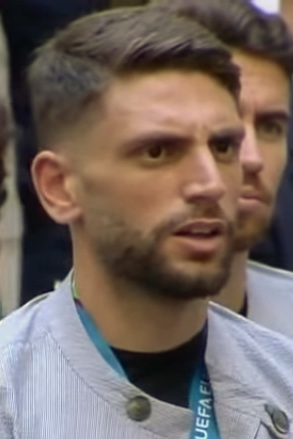
- Berardi with Italy in 2021

Personal information
- Full name: Domenico Berardi
- Date of birth: 1 August 1994 (age 32)
- Place of birth: Cariati, Italy
- Height: 1.83 m (6 ft 0 in)
- Positions: Forward; right winger

Team information
- Current team: Sassuolo
- Number: 10

Youth career
- 2008–2010: Cosenza
- 2010–2012: Sassuolo

Senior career*
Years	Team	Apps	(Gls)
2012–2013	Sassuolo	37	(11)
2013–2015	Juventus	0	(0)
2013–2015	→ Sassuolo (loan)	61	(31)
2015–	Sassuolo	314	(107)

International career
2012–2013	Italy U19	3	(1)
2014–2017	Italy U21	23	(4)
2018–2023	Italy	27	(8)
Medal record
Men's Football
Representing Italy
UEFA European Championship
Winner	2020 Europe
UEFA Nations League
Third place	2021 Italy
- * Club domestic league appearances and goals as of 20:48, 16 October 2026 (UTC)

Domenico Berardi Cavaliere OMRI (Italian pronunciation: [doˈmeːniko beˈrardi]; born 1 August 1994) is an Italian professional footballer who plays as a forward or right winger for Serie A club Sassuolo.

Berardi began his club career with Sassuolo during the 2012–13 Serie B season, helping the team win the title and earn promotion to Serie A, being named the best player of the competition. His prolific performances in Serie A saw him emerge as one of Italy's most promising young footballers, and earned him the Bravo Award in 2015. He is Sassuolo's all-time top scorer, with over 150 goals in all competitions.

Berardi made his senior international debut with Italy in 2018, and was a member of the squad that won UEFA Euro 2020.

== Club career ==
=== Sassuolo ===
==== Youth career ====
Born in Cariati, Calabria, Berardi joined the youth academy of Cosenza at the age of 13, before moving to Sassuolo at the age of 16.

==== 2012–13 season ====
He made his senior debut for Sassuolo in Serie B on 27 August 2012, at the age of 18, in a 3–0 away win over Cesena, and scored his first professional goal five days later, in a 2–1 home win over Crotone. In 2013, he was named Best Player of the Serie B in the past season in the annual Gran Galà del calcio awards, after helping Sassuolo win the Serie B title, and a historic promotion to Serie A, scoring 11 goals. In June 2013, he was described as the "undoubted star of the [Sassuolo] side."

==== 2013–14 season ====
On 2 September 2013, Juventus confirmed via their official website that Berardi had joined the club on a co-ownership basis that saw Luca Marrone transfer in the opposite direction, both for a fee of €4.5 million. Berardi remained with Sassuolo on a season-long loan deal for the 2013–14 season. He made his Serie A debut at the age of 19, in a 1–1 away draw against Napoli, on 25 September 2013. He scored his first Serie A goal from a penalty on 6 October 2013, in a 3–1 defeat to Parma. On 20 October, he scored a penalty as Sassuolo defeated Bologna 2–1 for their first Serie A win, moving them off bottom spot. He scored a hat-trick, including two penalties, in Sassuolo's first ever Serie A away win, 4–3 against Sampdoria on 3 November 2013.

On 12 January 2014, Berardi scored all four goals in a 4–3 home win against AC Milan. In doing so, he became the second youngest player to score four goals in a single Serie A match – the youngest was the 18-year-old Silvio Piola in 1931 – and the first player to score four in a league match against Milan. On 6 May 2014, Berardi scored a first-half hat-trick in 4–3 away win at Fiorentina. He finished the season with 16 goals in 29 games in the league as Sassuolo avoided relegation.

==== 2014–15 season ====
In July 2014, Berardi's agent confirmed that he would remain on loan at Sassuolo for another season; the co-ownership deal was also renewed on 20 June 2014.

On 17 May 2015, he scored a hat-trick at the Mapei Stadium in a 3–2 win over Milan. He finished the 2014–15 Serie A season with 15 goals and 10 assists, and was one of the top assist providers in the league. He reached 30 league goals in 59 games, noted by UEFA to be quicker than the 70 matches taken for Lionel Messi to reach that milestone; at the age of 20, he also became the youngest player to reach 30 Serie A goals since 1958.

==== 2015–16 season ====
On 25 June 2015, it was announced through an official statement that co-ownership was resolved in favour of Sassuolo for €10 million. It was reported that it was part of Simone Zaza's deal to Juventus. However, Juventus also retained the option to bring Berardi back to Turin in 2016.

Berardi opened the 2015–16 Serie A season with a Man of the Match performance in a 2–1 home win over Napoli, setting up Floro Flores's goal; however, he also picked up an injury during the match, which would reportedly rule him out for a month and a half. He returned to the pitch after an early recovery on 20 September 2015, coming on as a substitute in a 2–2 away draw against Roma. He scored his first goal of the season from the penalty spot in a 2–1 home win over Lazio on 18 October 2015. Sassuolo finished the league season in sixth place, sealing a spot in the third qualifying round of the 2016–17 UEFA Europa League.

==== 2016–17 season ====
On 28 July 2016, Berardi made his debut in European competitions in the first leg of a third-round UEFA Europa League qualifying match against FC Luzern, scoring his and Sassuolo's first ever goal in the competition from the penalty spot in a 1–1 away draw. In the return leg on 4 August, he scored twice in a 3–0 home win which allowed Sassuolo to advance to the play-off round. In the first leg of the Europa League play-offs, on 18 August, Berardi scored a goal and set up another in a 3–0 home win over Red Star Belgrade. On the opening match of the 2016–17 Serie A season three days later, he scored once again, from the penalty spot, to give Sassuolo a 1–0 away victory over Palermo. On 25 August, he scored yet another goal (his sixth in five matches) in a 1–1 draw against Red Star Belgrade in the return leg of the Europa League play-offs to seal a spot for Sassuolo in the season's Europa League group stage. On 28 August, he continued his goalscoring run, netting a goal in a 2–1 home win over Pescara, becoming the youngest Italian player since the 1994–95 season to score 40 goals in Serie A, and the second youngest player overall, behind Alexandre Pato, at the age of 22 years and 27 days; he later suffered an injury during the match, and it was later announced that he had suffered knee ligament damage, ruling him out for the rest of the calendar year. After being sidelined for almost four and a half months, Berardi returned to action as a second-half substitute in a 0–0 home draw against Torino on 8 January 2017.

==== 2017–present ====
On 24 August 2017, Berardi signed a five-year contract with Sassuolo. On 19 August 2018, Berardi scored a goal from a penalty in a 1–0 home win over Inter Milan, in the first match of the 2018–19 Serie A season. On 1 September 2019, Berardi netted a hat-trick in a 4–1 win over Sampdoria.

On 17 April 2021, Berardi scored twice as Sassuolo came from behind to beat Fiorentina by a score of 3–1. This meant that Berardi had reached 100 goals in all competitions for the Neroverdi since debuting for the club in the Serie B in August 2012. On 23 May 2021, Berardi scored his 17th goal of the 2020–21 Serie A season in a 2–0 win over Lazio. It was Berardi's best goal-scoring season in his professional career and helped Sassuolo to an 8th place finish, missing out on European competition on goal difference.

On 18 March 2022, Berardi scored twice in a 4–1 home win over Spezia; his second goal, which came from a penalty, was his 100th goal in Serie A, all of which came with Sassuolo. In the 2022–23 season, he scored 12 goals in Serie A, the most by an Italian player along with Ciro Immobile.

On 23 September 2023, Berardi celebrated his milestone of 300 games in Serie A with a goal against Juventus, in the eventual 4–2 home win. On 28 September 2023, during weekday away game against Inter Milan, he scored the winning goal in a 2–1 comeback for Sassuolo.

On 3 March 2024, after returning to action from an injury to his left knee sustained in January, Berardi suffered an injury to his right ankle in the second half of a 1–0 away defeat to Verona in Serie A, which immediately forced him off the pitch. After surgical reparation of a torn Achilles tendon, he began rehabilitation expected to last approximately 10 months.

During the 2024 summer transfer window, Berardi was linked with a transfer to several clubs, including former club Juventus. However, he stayed at Sassuolo despite the club's recent relegation to the Serie B in his absence.

In October 2024, Berardi returned to playing.

== International career ==
=== Youth ===
Berardi was a component of the Italian under-19 national team, but did not answer his call-up for qualifications to the European Championship of the age group and was disqualified for nine months for violation of the code of ethics.

Berardi has played for the Italian under-21 national team. He received his first call-up on 28 February 2014, for the team's European qualifying match against Northern Ireland on 5 March. On 2 March, however, he elbowed Cristian Molinaro during Sassuolo's league fixture against Parma, and was subsequently excluded from the squad for violating the team's code of ethics. He made his debut under Italy under-21 manager Luigi Di Biagio on 4 June 2014, in a 4–0 home win over Montenegro. He scored his first goal on his third appearance for the azzurrini, the match-winning goal in a 3–2 win over Serbia in a 2015 UEFA European Under-21 Championship qualifying match, which allowed Italy to progress to the playoffs, and eventually qualify for the final tournament, which would be held in the Czech Republic.

On 1 June 2015, Berardi was selected in Di Biagio's 27-man provisional squad for the 2015 UEFA European Under-21 Championship; on 7 June, he was included in the final 23-man squad which would take part at the tournament. Berardi scored a goal from a penalty in Italy's opening match of the tournament, against Sweden, on 18 June, which ended in a 2–1 loss. On 24 June, he set up Andrea Belotti's goal in Italy's 3–1 win over England in Italy's final group match, although the result was not enough to see the Italian under-21 side progress to the semi-finals, as the azzurrini finished third in their group, behind the two eventual finalists Portugal and Sweden.

In June 2017, Berardi was included in the Italy under-21 squad for the 2017 UEFA European Under-21 Championship by manager Di Biagio. In Italy's second group match on 21 June, he scored his team's only goal in a 3–1 defeat to Czech Republic. Italy were eliminated by Spain in the semi-finals on 27 June, following a 3–1 defeat.

=== Senior ===
Berardi received his first senior international call-up for Italy from manager Antonio Conte in October 2015, ahead of Italy's UEFA Euro 2016 qualifiers against Azerbaijan and Norway on 10 and 13 October; he suffered a muscular injury in Sassuolo's pre-match warmup against Empoli on 4 October, however, which forced him to pull out of the national side for the two upcoming fixtures.

In May 2017, Berardi was selected by Italy's senior head coach Gian Piero Ventura for the team's unofficial friendly against San Marino in Empoli on 31 May. He made his unofficial senior international debut in the match, captaining the squad, and starting in Italy's eventual 8–0 win, setting up Gianluca Lapadula's second goal.

Berardi made his official senior international debut for Italy under Roberto Mancini, starting in a 3–1 friendly loss to France in Nice on 1 June 2018.

Berardi scored his first senior goal for the national team on 7 October 2020, the final goal of a 6–0 home win against Moldova in a friendly match.

In June 2021, Berardi was included in Italy's squad for UEFA Euro 2020. In the opening match of the tournament on 11 June, a 3–0 win over Turkey, his cross led to the opening goal of the game, an own–goal by Merih Demiral. In the following group match on 16 June, he set up Manuel Locatelli for Italy's opening goal in an eventual 3–0 win over Switzerland. On 11 July, Berardi won the European Championship with Italy following a 3–2 penalty shoot-out victory over England at Wembley Stadium in the final, after a 1–1 draw in extra-time; Berardi came on as a substitute for Ciro Immobile in the second half of regulation time, and later scored Italy's first spot-kick in the shoot-out.

On 10 October, Berardi scored the match–winning goal from a penalty in a 2–1 home victory over Belgium in the bronze medal match of the 2020–21 UEFA Nations League.

== Style of play ==
"He's our symbol, the Francesco Totti of Sassuolo."

— Sassuolo CEO Giovanni Carnevali on Berardi.

A quick, tenacious, technically gifted and hardworking left-footed forward, with an eye for goal, Berardi is capable of being deployed in several offensive positions across the pitch. He has been utilised as a striker and as a supporting forward, although his preferred position is on the right wing, which allows him to cut into the centre and shoot on goal with his stronger left foot, or link up with teammates to create goalscoring opportunities for other players. Berardi has also been praised for his movement, positional sense, and work-rate off the ball, as well as his determination, maturity, tactical intelligence, decision making, and composure; however, he has also drawn criticism at times for his behaviour, lack of discipline, and a tendency to pick up unnecessary cards. He has also struggled with injuries throughout his career. An accurate finisher from both inside and outside the area, and in one on one situations, he is also an accurate set-piece and penalty taker. Berardi is regarded as one of the most talented and promising young footballers of his generation; in 2013, 2014, and 2015, Don Balón listed him as one of the top-100 young players in the world.

In 2014, former AC Milan and Italy manager Arrigo Sacchi described Berardi as "a player of great talent, a modern footballer who constantly plays with and for the team all over the field. Liveliness, intuition, temperament, physical strength, stamina combined with a good technique are his main attributes." In 2015, 1982 FIFA World Cup winner Giancarlo Antognoni described Berardi as "...the young [Roberto] Baggio of this generation" who "mixes creativity with strength. Just like when Platini called Baggio 'a nine and a half.' He must only learn to control his character. At times his temper betrays him but he will learn." In a 2015 interview, Berardi stated that his main influences as a footballer were Lionel Messi, Zlatan Ibrahimović and Arjen Robben. In 2017, he revealed that Inter Milan was his favorite childhood team, also describing Ronaldo and Diego Milito as his biggest footballing idols at the time.

== Career statistics ==
=== Club ===
As of match played 16 October 2026

Appearances and goals by club, season and competition
Club	Season	League			Coppa Italia		Europe		Total	
Club	Season	Division	Apps	Goals	Apps	Goals	Apps	Goals	Apps	Goals
Sassuolo	2012–13	Serie B	37	11	2	0	—		39	11
Juventus	2013–14	Serie A	—		—		—		0	0
Juventus	2014–15	Serie A	—		—		—		0	0
Juventus	Total		0	0	0	0	0	0	0	0
Sassuolo (loan)	2013–14	Serie A	29	16	1	0	—		30	16
Sassuolo (loan)	2014–15	Serie A	32	15	2	0	—		34	15
Sassuolo (loan)	Total		61	31	3	0	0	0	64	31
Sassuolo	2015–16	Serie A	29	7	2	0	—		31	7
Sassuolo	2016–17	Serie A	21	5	0	0	4 (Note: Appearances in UEFA Europa League)	5	25	10
Sassuolo	2017–18	Serie A	31	4	2	1	—		33	5
Sassuolo	2018–19	Serie A	35	8	2	2	—		37	10
Sassuolo	2019–20	Serie A	31	14	1	0	—		32	14
Sassuolo	2020–21	Serie A	30	17	0	0	—		30	17
Sassuolo	2021–22	Serie A	33	15	1	0	—		34	15
Sassuolo	2022–23	Serie A	26	12	1	1	—		27	13
Sassuolo	2023–24	Serie A	17	9	1	0	—		18	9
Sassuolo	2024–25	Serie B	29	6	0	0	—		29	6
Sassuolo	2025–26	Serie A	26	8	1	0	—		27	8
Sassuolo	2026–27	Serie A	6	2	1	0	—		7	2
Sassuolo	Total		314	107	12	4	4	5	330	116
Career total			412	149	17	4	4	5	433	158

=== International ===
As of match played 17 November 2023

Appearances and goals by national team and year
National team	Year	Apps	Goals
Italy	2018	5	0
Italy	2019	0	0
Italy	2020	4	3
Italy	2021	14	3
Italy	2022	1	0
Italy	2023	3	2
Total		27	8

Scores and results list Italy's goal tally first, score column indicates score after each Berardi goal.

List of international goals scored by Domenico Berardi
No.	Date	Venue	Opponent	Score	Result	Competition
1	7 October 2020	Stadio Artemio Franchi, Florence, Italy	Moldova	6–0	6–0	Friendly
2	15 November 2020	Mapei Stadium, Reggio Emilia, Italy	Poland	2–0	2–0	2020–21 UEFA Nations League A
3	18 November 2020	Stadion Grbavica, Sarajevo, Bosnia and Herzegovina	Bosnia and Herzegovina	2–0	2–0	2020–21 UEFA Nations League A
4	25 March 2021	Stadio Ennio Tardini, Parma, Italy	Northern Ireland	1–0	2–0	2022 FIFA World Cup qualification
5	4 June 2021	Stadio Renato Dall'Ara, Bologna, Italy	Czech Republic	4–0	4–0	Friendly
6	10 October 2021	Juventus Stadium, Turin, Italy	Belgium	2–0	2–1	2021 UEFA Nations League Finals
7	14 October 2023	Stadio San Nicola, Bari, Italy	Malta	2–0	4–0	UEFA Euro 2024 qualifying
8	14 October 2023	Stadio San Nicola, Bari, Italy	Malta	3–0	4–0	UEFA Euro 2024 qualifying

== Honours ==
Sassuolo

- Serie B: 2012–13, 2024–25

Italy

- UEFA European Championship: 2020
- UEFA Nations League third place: 2020–21

Individual

- Serie B Footballer of the Year: 2013
- AIAC Leader Under-21 Award: 2013–14
- Bravo Award: 2015
- Serie A top assist provider: 2014–15, 2021–22

Orders

- 5th Class / Knight: Cavaliere Ordine al Merito della Repubblica Italiana: 2021
