= Luca Lipani =

Italian footballer (born 2005)

Personal information
- Full name: Luca Lipani
- Date of birth: 18 May 2005 (age 21)
- Place of birth: Genoa, Italy
- Height: 1.85 m (6 ft 1 in)
- Position: Midfielder

Team information
- Current team: Sassuolo
- Number: 35

Youth career
- 2012–2023: Genoa

Senior career*
Years	Team	Apps	(Gls)
2022–2023	Genoa	2	(0)
2023–	Sassuolo	54	(1)

International career^{‡}
2019	Italy U15	3	(0)
2021–2022	Italy U17	18	(2)
2022	Italy U18	1	(0)
2022–2024	Italy U19	25	(5)
2023–2025	Italy U20	10	(2)
2025–	Italy U21	12	(5)
2026–	Italy	2	(0)
Medal record
Men's football
Representing Italy
FIFA U-20 World Cup
Runner-up	2023 Argentina
UEFA European Under-19 Championship
Winner	2023 Malta
- * Club domestic league appearances and goals as of 23:34, 25 May 2026 (UTC) ‡ National team caps and goals as of 16 November 2026

Luca Lipani (born 18 May 2005) is an Italian professional footballer who plays as a midfielder for Serie A club Sassuolo and the Italy national team.

== Club career ==
Born in Genoa, Lipani joined the eponymous team's youth sector at the age of seven. Having come through the club's youth ranks, he started playing for the under-19 squad during the 2021–22 season.

Since the start of 2022–23 season, the midfielder started training with the first team, under head coach Alexander Blessin, before being regularly included in senior match-day squads by new manager Alberto Gilardino. In December 2022, he renewed his professional contract with Genoa, with the length remaining undisclosed.

On 25 February 2023, Lipani made his professional debut, coming on as a substitute for Milan Badelj at the 85th minute of a Serie B match against SPAL: in the same occasion, he served an assist for Eddie Salcedo, whose goal settled up the game's final score for a 3–0 win. At the end of the campaign, he was involved in a double promotion, as Genoa's first team returned to Serie A after just one year, while the Primavera squad gained automatic promotion back to the Campionato Primavera 1.

On 8 August 2023, Lipani joined fellow Serie A club Sassuolo on a permanent deal, for a reported fee of eight million euros, plus add-ons. On 2 November, he made his debut for the club, coming on for Uroš Račić in the first half of extra-time of a Coppa Italia match against Spezia, which ended in a 5–4 win on penalties. On 3 January 2024, he made his first start for the Neroverdi in a 3–1 cup defeat to Atalanta.

== International career ==
Lipani has represented Italy at various youth international levels, having played for the under-15, under-17, under-18, under-19 and under-20 national teams. He also wore the captain armband for the under-17 national team.

In May 2022, he was included in the Italian squad that took part in the UEFA European Under-17 Championship in Israel: during the tournament, he scored a goal, as the Azzurrini were eventually eliminated by the Netherlands (2–1) in the quarter-finals.

In December of the same year, he took part in a training camp with the staff of the Italian senior national team, under manager Roberto Mancini.

In May 2023, he was included by head coach Carmine Nunziata in the Italian squad that took part in the FIFA U-20 World Cup in Argentina, where the Azzurrini finished runners-up after losing to Uruguay in the final match.

In June of the same year, he was included in the Italian squad for the UEFA European Under-19 Championship in Malta, where the Azzurrini eventually won their second continental title.

In May 2026, Lipani was one of the players who were called up with the Italy national senior squad by interim head coach Silvio Baldini, for the friendly matches against Luxembourg and Greece on 3 and 7 June 2026, respectively.

== Style of play ==
Lipani is a right-footed holding midfielder, who excels in winning the ball during the defensive phase, as well as creating chances for his team-mates, thanks to his technical skills. Despite mainly playing in a defensive role, he has also been regarded for his goal contributions, thanks to his shooting abilities.

He has cited Milan Badelj as a source of inspiration.

== Career statistics ==
=== Club ===
As of match played 17 August 2026

Appearances and goals by club, season and competition
Club	Season	League			Coppa Italia		Total	
Club	Season	Division	Apps	Goals	Apps	Goals	Apps	Goals
Genoa	2022–23	Serie B	2	0	0	0	2	0
Sassuolo	2023–24	Serie A	8	0	2	0	10	0
Sassuolo	2024–25	Serie B	22	1	2	0	24	1
Sassuolo	2025–26	Serie A	24	0	2	0	26	0
Sassuolo	2026–27	Serie A	0	0	1	1	1	1
Sassuolo	Total		54	1	7	1	61	2
Career total			56	1	7	1	63	2

=== International ===
As of match played 7 June 2026

Appearances and goals by national team and year
National team	Year	Apps	Goals
Italy	2026	2	0
Total		2	0

== Honours ==
Sassuolo

- Serie B: 2024–25

Italy U20

- FIFA U-20 World Cup runner-up: 2023

Italy U19

- UEFA European Under-19 Championship: 2023
