= Samuele Mulattieri =

Italian footballer (born 2000)

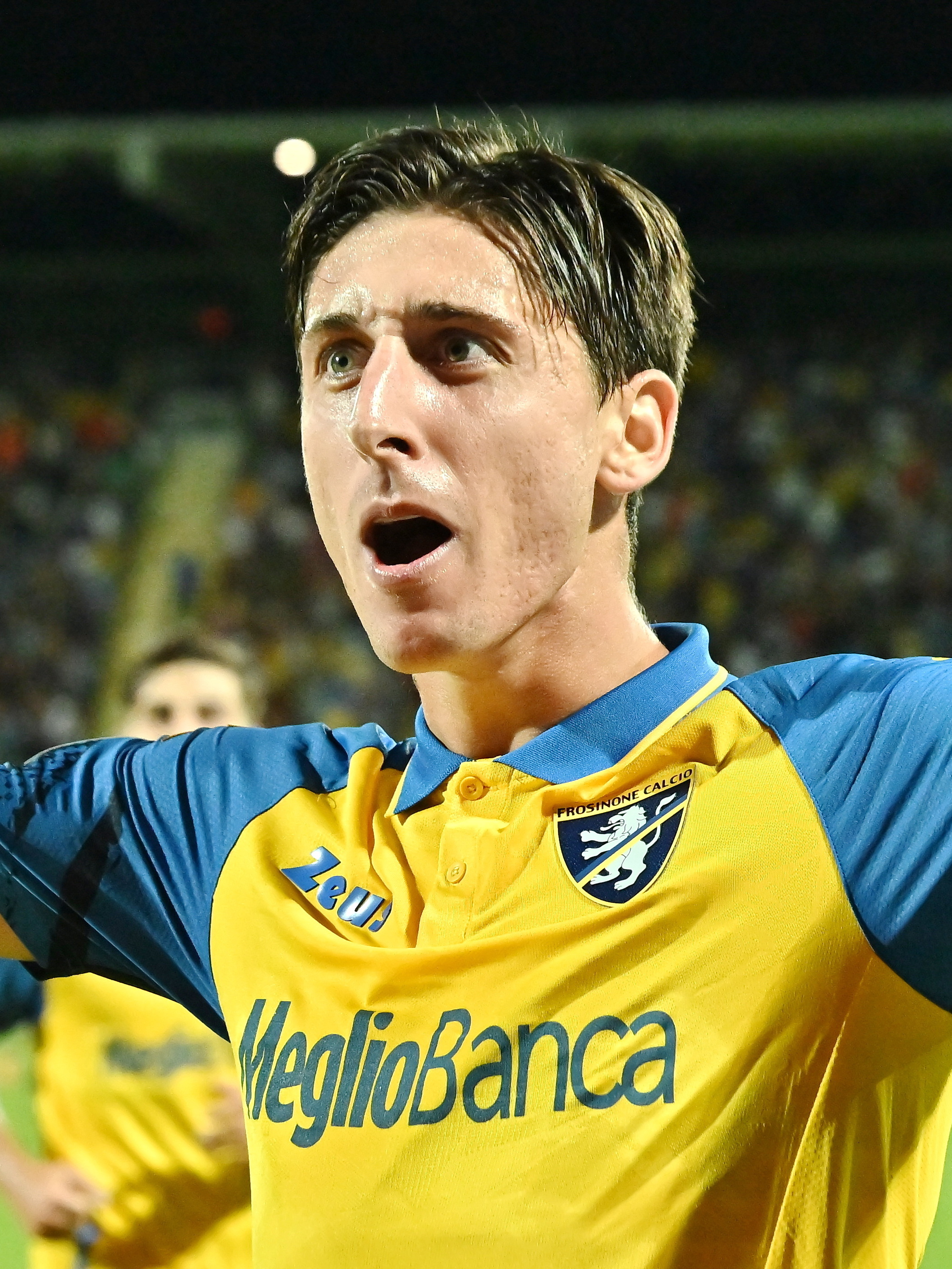
- Mulattieri with Frosinone in 2022

Personal information
- Date of birth: 7 October 2000 (age 26)
- Place of birth: La Spezia, Italy
- Height: 1.83 m (6 ft 0 in)
- Position: Forward

Team information
- Current team: Hellas Verona (on loan from Sassuolo)
- Number: 19

Youth career
- 2008–2018: Spezia
- 2018–2020: Inter Milan

Senior career*
Years	Team	Apps	(Gls)
2018	Spezia	3	(1)
2020–2023	Inter Milan	0	(0)
2020–2021	→ Volendam (loan)	30	(18)
2021–2022	→ Crotone (loan)	28	(6)
2022–2023	→ Frosinone (loan)	29	(12)
2023–	Sassuolo	59	(9)
2025–2026	→ Deportivo La Coruña (loan)	29	(4)
2026–	→ Hellas Verona (loan)	0	(0)

International career
2018	Italy U18	5	(1)
2018	Italy U19	1	(1)
2021–2023	Italy U21	5	(3)
- * Club domestic league appearances and goals as of 31 May 2026

Samuele Mulattieri (born 7 October 2000) is an Italian professional footballer who plays as a forward for Serie B club Hellas Verona, on loan from Sassuolo.

== Club career ==
=== Spezia ===
A youth academy graduate of Spezia, Mulattieri made his professional debut on 14 April 2018 in a 1–1 draw against Frosinone. He scored his first goal following week in a 3–2 defeat against Pescara.

=== Inter Milan ===
He joined Inter Milan after the end of 2017–18 Serie B season.

Mulattieri spent his first two seasons as Inter Milan player with primavera team in Campionato Primavera 1.

==== Loan moves ====
On 5 October 2020, he joined Dutch club Volendam on a season long loan deal. On 27 July 2021, he joined Serie B club Crotone on a season long loan deal. On 25 July 2022, he moved to Frosinone on loan, with an option to buy.

=== Sassuolo ===
On 7 July 2023, Mulattieri joined Sassuolo on a permanent transfer.

==== Loan to Deportivo La Coruña ====
On 26 August 2025, Mulattieri was loaned to Spanish Segunda División side Deportivo La Coruña for one year.

==== Loan to Hellas Verona ====
On 31 July 2026, Mulattieri joined Hellas Verona on loan, with the move including an obligation to buy if certain conditions were met.

== International career ==
On 7 September 2021, he made his debut with the Italy U21 squad, playing as a substitute in the qualifying match won 1–0 against Montenegro.

== Career statistics ==
As of match played 9 May 2025

Appearances and goals by club, season and competition
Club	Season	League			Cup		Other		Total	
Club	Season	Division	Apps	Goals	Apps	Goals	Apps	Goals	Apps	Goals
Spezia	2017–18	Serie B	3	1	0	0	—		3	1
Volendam (loan)	2020–21	Eerste Divisie	30	18	1	0	1 (Note: Appearance in promotion/relegation play-offs)	1	32	19
Crotone (loan)	2021–22	Serie B	28	6	1	1	—		29	7
Frosinone (loan)	2022–23	Serie B	29	12	1	0	—		30	12
Sassuolo	2023–24	Serie A	27	0	3	2	—		30	2
Sassuolo	2024–25	Serie B	32	9	2	2	—		34	11
Sassuolo	Total		59	9	5	4	0	0	64	13
Career total			149	46	8	5	1	1	158	52

== Honours ==
Sassuolo

- Serie B: 2024–25
