= Alessandro Russo (footballer, born 2003) =

Italian footballer (born 2003)

Personal information
- Date of birth: 6 September 2003 (age 23)
- Place of birth: Avellino, Italy
- Height: 1.78 m (5 ft 10 in)
- Position: Midfielder

Team information
- Current team: Gravina

Youth career
- Salernitana
- 2019–2020: → Lazio (loan)

Senior career*
Years	Team	Apps	(Gls)
2021–2023	Salernitana	1	(0)
2023–2024	Matese	13	(2)
2024–	Gravina	1	(0)
- * Club domestic league appearances and goals as of 17 November 2024

Alessandro Russo (born 6 September 2003) is an Italian footballer who plays as a midfielder for Serie D club Gravina.

== Career ==
In the 2019–20 season, Russo played for the Under-17 squad of Lazio.

He made his Serie A debut for Salernitana on 23 January 2022 in a game against Napoli.
