= Andrea Pinamonti =

Italian footballer (born 1999)

Personal information
- Full name: Andrea Pinamonti
- Date of birth: 19 May 1999 (age 27)
- Place of birth: Cles, Italy
- Height: 1.88 m (6 ft 2 in)
- Position: Striker

Team information
- Current team: Lazio
- Number: 9

Youth career
- –2013: Chievo
- 2013–2017: Inter Milan

Senior career*
Years	Team	Apps	(Gls)
2016–2020	Inter Milan	3	(0)
2018–2019	→ Frosinone (loan)	27	(5)
2019–2020	→ Genoa (loan)	32	(5)
2020	Genoa	0	(0)
2020–2023	Inter Milan	8	(1)
2021–2022	→ Empoli (loan)	36	(13)
2022–2023	→ Sassuolo (loan)	32	(5)
2023–2026	Sassuolo	74	(20)
2024–2025	→ Genoa (loan)	36	(10)
2026–	Lazio	8	(2)

International career^{‡}
2014	Italy U15	6	(4)
2014–2015	Italy U16	13	(6)
2015–2016	Italy U17	15	(7)
2016–2018	Italy U19	21	(3)
2018–2019	Italy U20	11	(5)
2019–2021	Italy U21	9	(2)
2022–	Italy	1	(0)
Medal record
Men's football
Representing Italy
UEFA European Under-19 Championship
Runner-up	2018 Finland
- * Club domestic league appearances and goals as of 17:19, 1 November 2026 (UTC) ‡ National team caps and goals as of 16 November 2022

Andrea Pinamonti (born 19 May 1999) is an Italian professional footballer who plays as a striker for Serie A club Lazio and the Italy national team.

== Club career ==
=== Inter Milan ===
At the age of 17 on 8 December 2016, Pinamonti made his senior debut for Inter Milan against Sparta Prague in the last match of 2016–17 UEFA Europa League group stage. He was selected as a starter by coach Stefano Pioli and delivered a well-received performance, helping Inter to finish their European campaign with a 2–1 victory. On 12 February 2017, Pinamonti made his Serie A debut in a 2–0 victory against Empoli at San Siro. He latter dubbed his debut as "indescribable". In the 2016–17 season, Pinamonti also won the Primavera title with the U19 youth team.

In the 2017–18 season, Pinamonti became a member of the first team but continued to play with Internzionale's U19 team in the UEFA Youth League. He made his season's first appearance on 12 December 2017, playing as a starter in the Coppa Italia match against Serie C club Pordenone.

==== Loan moves to Frosinone, Genoa, and Empoli ====
On 17 August 2018, Pinamonti joined Serie A club Frosinone on loan until 30 June 2019. He scored his first goal in Serie A with Frosinone on 28 October against SPAL.

On 30 June 2019, Pinamonti joined Genoa on loan with an obligation to buy. On 18 September 2020, his contract was bought back by Inter Milan. On 25 August 2021, he joined Empoli on a season-long loan.

=== Sassuolo ===
On 11 August 2022, Pinamonti joined Sassuolo on loan with an obligation to buy for a reported fee of €20 million, with a subsequent contract valid until June 2027.

==== Loan to Genoa ====
On 16 August 2024, Pinamonti returned to Genoa on loan with an option to buy.

=== Lazio ===
On 27 August 2026, Pinamonti joined Lazio for €3 million on a five-year deal.

== International career ==
In January 2019, Pinamonti was called up for the 2019 UEFA European Under-21 Championship, but forced to withdraw due to a knee injury he suffered at the U-20 FIFA World Cup earlier that year. On 16 November 2022, Pinamonti made his senior team debut in a 3–1 friendly victory against Albania.

== Personal life ==
Pinamonti is a lifelong Inter fan and has cited Mauro Icardi as his favourite player and role model.

== Career statistics ==
=== Club ===
As of match played 1 November 2026

Appearances and goals by club, season and competition
Club	Season	League			Coppa Italia		Europe		Total	
Club	Season	Division	Apps	Goals	Apps	Goals	Apps	Goals	Apps	Goals
Inter Milan	2016–17	Serie A	2	0	0	0	1 (Note: Appearance in UEFA Europa League)	0	3	0
Inter Milan	2017–18	Serie A	1	0	1	0	—		2	0
Inter Milan	2020–21	Serie A	8	1	1	0	1 (Note: Appearance in UEFA Champions League)	0	10	1
Inter Milan	Total		11	1	2	0	2	0	15	1
Frosinone (loan)	2018–19	Serie A	27	5	0	0	—		27	5
Genoa (loan)	2019–20	Serie A	32	5	2	2	—		34	7
Empoli (loan)	2021–22	Serie A	36	13	1	0	—		37	13
Sassuolo (loan)	2022–23	Serie A	32	5	—		—		32	5
Sassuolo	2023–24	Serie A	38	11	2	1	—		40	12
Sassuolo	2025–26	Serie A	36	9	1	0	—		37	9
Sassuolo	Sassuolo total		106	25	3	1	—		109	26
Genoa (loan)	2024–25	Serie A	36	10	1	1	—		37	11
Lazio	2026–27	Serie A	8	2	—		—		8	2
Career total			256	61	9	4	2	0	267	65

=== International ===
As of match played 16 November 2022

Appearances and goals by national team and year
National team	Year	Apps	Goals
Italy	2022	1	0
Total		1	0

== Honours ==
Inter Milan

- Serie A: 2020–21

Italy U19

- UEFA European Under-19 Championship runner-up: 2018
