= Stefano Piccinini =

Italian footballer (born 2002)

Personal information
- Date of birth: 31 December 2002 (age 23)
- Place of birth: Reggio Emilia, Italy
- Height: 1.86 m (6 ft 1 in)
- Position: Defender

Team information
- Current team: Monopoli
- Number: 35

Youth career
- –2018: Reggiana
- 2018–2020: Sassuolo

Senior career*
Years	Team	Apps	(Gls)
2020–2024	Sassuolo	1	(0)
2021–2022	→ Vis Pesaro (loan)	32	(0)
2022–2024	→ Pergolettese (loan)	63	(6)
2024–2026	Cittadella	5	(0)
2025–2026	→ Monopoli (loan)	30	(0)
2026–	Monopoli	0	(0)

International career^{‡}
2020	Italy U18	1	(0)
- * Club domestic league appearances and goals as of 1 May 2026 ‡ National team caps and goals as of 12 February 2020

Stefano Piccinini (born 31 December 2002) is an Italian professional footballer who plays as a defender for Serie C Group C club Monopoli.

== Club career ==
On 22 May 2020, Piccinini signed his first professional contract with Sassuolo. On 2 August 2020, he made his Serie A debut against Udinese.

On 17 July 2021, Piccinini was loaned to Serie C club Vis Pesaro. On 4 August 2022, he moved on a new loan to Pergolettese. The loan was extended for the 2023–24 season.

On 30 August 2024, Piccinini signed for Cittadella.

== Personal life ==
His older brother Gabriele Piccinini is also a footballer.

== Club statistics ==
=== Club ===
As of match played 9 April 2022

Club	Season	League			Cup		Other		Total	
Club	Season	Division	Apps	Goals	Apps	Goals	Apps	Goals	Apps	Goals
Sassuolo	2019–20	Serie A	1	0	1	0	0	0	2	0
Vis Pesaro (loan)	2021–22	Serie C	32	0	0	0	0	0	32	0
Career total			33	0	1	0	0	0	34	0
