= Edoardo Pieragnolo =

Italian footballer

Personal information
- Date of birth: 3 January 2003 (age 23)
- Place of birth: Padua, Italy
- Height: 1.84 m (6 ft 0 in)
- Position: Left-back

Team information
- Current team: Sassuolo

Youth career
- 2012–2018: Padova
- 2018–2024: Sassuolo

Senior career*
Years	Team	Apps	(Gls)
2024–	Sassuolo	20	(0)
2023–2024	→ Reggiana (loan)	33	(4)

International career^{‡}
2022	Italy U19	1	(0)
2023	Italy U20	3	(0)
2024	Italy U21	2	(0)
- * Club domestic league appearances and goals as of 01:34, 26 May 2025 (UTC) ‡ National team caps and goals as of 01:34, 26 May 2025 (UTC)

Edoardo Pieragnolo (born 3 January 2003) is an Italian professional footballer who plays as a left-back for Serie A club Sassuolo.

== Club career ==
A youth product of Padova for 6 years, Pieragnolo joined the youth academy of Sassuolo in 2018. On 20 December 2022, he signed his first professional contract with Sassuolo until 2027. On 8 July 2023, he joined Reggiana on a season-long loan in the Serie B. He debuted with Reggiana in a 6–2 Coppa Italia win over Pescara on 6 August 2023. After a successful season with Reggiana scoring 4 goals in 34 matches, Pieragnolo returned to Sassuolo on 6 June 2024 for the following season in the Serie B. On 16 October 2024, he extended his professional contract until 2029. He helped Sassuolo win the 2024–25 Serie B, earning the club promotion to the Serie A.

== International career ==
Pieragnolo was called up to the Italy U21s in May 2024 for the 2024 Maurice Revello Tournament.

== Honours ==
Sassuolo

- Serie B: 2024–25
