= Luca Moro (footballer) =

Italian footballer (born 2001)

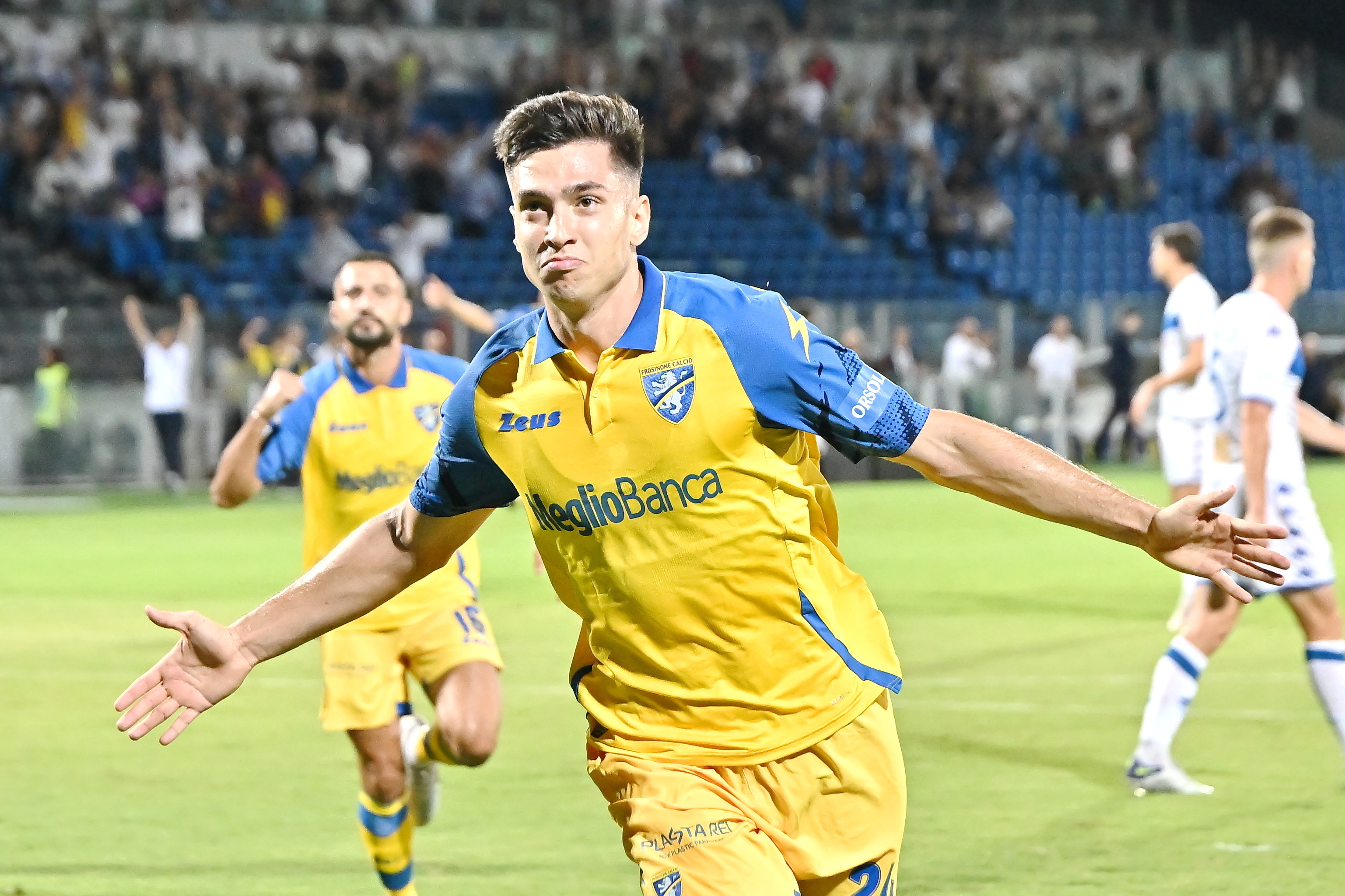
- Moro playing in Frosinone in 2022

Personal information
- Date of birth: 25 January 2001 (age 25)
- Place of birth: Sant'Elena, Italy
- Height: 1.89 m (6 ft 2 in)
- Position: Forward

Team information
- Current team: Padova
- Number: 9

Youth career
- Padova
- 2019–2020: → Genoa (loan)
- 2020–2021: → SPAL (loan)

Senior career*
Years	Team	Apps	(Gls)
2019–2022	Padova	2	(0)
2019–2020	→ Genoa (loan)	0	(0)
2020–2021	→ SPAL (loan)	8	(0)
2021–2022	→ Catania (loan)	19	(20)
2022–2026	Sassuolo	39	(7)
2022	→ Catania (loan)	25	(21)
2022	→ Frosinone (loan)	34	(6)
2023–2024	→ Spezia (loan)	26	(4)
2026–	Padova	0	(0)

International career^{‡}
2021–2022	Italy U20	4	(1)
2022	Italy U21	1	(0)
- * Club domestic league appearances and goals as of 23 August 2026 ‡ National team caps and goals as of 26 September 2022

Luca Moro (born 25 January 2001) is an Italian professional footballer who plays as a forward for Serie B club Padova.

== Club career ==
Moro made his Serie B debut for Padova on 6 April 2019 in a game against Carpi, as an 82nd-minute substitute for Nico Pulzetti.

On 2 September 2019, he was loaned by Genoa and assigned to their Under-19 squad.

On 26 September 2020, he was loaned to SPAL, once again being assigned to the Under-19 squad. He was soon moved to the senior squad and made his debut for SPAL on 24 October 2020 against Vicenza.

On 31 August 2021, he was loaned to Serie C club Catania.

On 31 January 2022, his rights were bought by Sassuolo, who loaned him back to Catania for the remainder of the 2021–22 season. His loan was cut short on 9 April 2022, following Catania's exclusion from the Serie C league due to financial issues.

On 4 July 2022, Moro was loaned to Frosinone for the 2022–23 season.

On 18 July 2023, Moro joined Spezia on loan.

== Honours ==
Sassuolo

- Serie B: 2024–25
