= Andrea Ghion =

Italian footballer (born 2000)

Personal information
- Date of birth: 23 February 2000 (age 26)
- Place of birth: Mantua, Italy
- Height: 1.74 m (5 ft 9 in)
- Position: Midfielder

Team information
- Current team: Sassuolo
- Number: 8

Youth career
- 2015–2020: Sassuolo

Senior career*
Years	Team	Apps	(Gls)
2020–	Sassuolo	27	(0)
2020–2021	→ Carpi (loan)	33	(5)
2021–2022	→ Perugia (loan)	13	(0)
2022–2024	→ Catanzaro (loan)	54	(2)
2025–2026	→ Empoli (loan)	26	(0)

International career^{‡}
2015	Italy U16	1	(0)
- * Club domestic league appearances and goals as of 13 May 2026 ‡ National team caps and goals as of 16 July 2020

Andrea Ghion (born 23 February 2000) is an Italian professional footballer who plays as a midfielder for Serie A club Sassuolo.

== Club career ==
Ghion joined the youth academy of Sassuolo in 2015. He made his senior debut with Sassuolo in a 3–1 Serie A win over Fiorentina on 1 July 2020.

On 5 October 2020, he was loaned to Serie C club Carpi.

On 31 August 2021, he joined Perugia on a two-year loan. On 25 August 2022, that loan was cut short and Ghion was loaned to Catanzaro instead.

On 15 July 2023, the loan to Catanzaro was extended.

On 1 September 2025, Ghion was loaned to Empoli, with a conditional obligation to buy.

== International career ==
Ghion represented the Italy U16s in a 2–0 friendly win over the Bulgaria U16s on 26 August 2015.

== Honours ==
Sassuolo

- Serie B: 2024–25
