= Yeferson Paz =

Colombian footballer (born 2002)

Personal information
- Full name: Yeferson Santos Paz Blandón
- Date of birth: 13 June 2002 (age 24)
- Place of birth: El Carmen del Darién, Colombia
- Height: 1.79 m (5 ft 10 in)
- Position: Right-back

Team information
- Current team: Sassuolo
- Number: 27

Youth career
- Cortuluá

Senior career*
| Years | Team | Apps | (Gls) |
| 2019–2020 | Cortuluá | 23 | (0) |
| 2021– | Sassuolo | 13 | (0) |
| 2022–2023 | → Perugia (loan) | 26 | (0) |
| 2023–2024 | → Perugia (loan) | 31 | (7) |
| 2026 | → Reggiana (loan) | 1 | (0) |

International career^{‡}
| 2019 | Colombia U17 | 3 | (0) |
| 2019 | Colombia U18 | 1 | (0) |
| 2020 | Colombia U20 | 2 | (0) |
- * Club domestic league appearances and goals as of 23 August 2026 ‡ National team caps and goals as of 19 December 2020

Yeferson Paz Blandón (born 13 June 2002) is a Colombian professional footballer who plays as a right-back for Serie A club Sassuolo.

== Club career ==
Paz started his career with Colombian second-tier side Cortuluá. Before the second half of 2020–21, he signed for Sassuolo in Serie A.

On 28 July 2022, Paz was sent on loan to Serie B club Perugia. On 5 August 2022, he made his professional debut for Perugia in a 3–2 loss to Cagliari.

On 7 September 2023, his loan to Perugia was officially renewed for another season.

On 1 February 2026, Paz was loaned by Reggiana.

== Honours ==
Sassuolo

- Serie B: 2024–25
