= Alessandro Russo (footballer, born 2001) =

Italian footballer

Personal information
- Date of birth: 31 March 2001 (age 25)
- Place of birth: Reggio Calabria, Italy
- Height: 1.93 m (6 ft 4 in)
- Position: Goalkeeper

Team information
- Current team: Sassuolo

Youth career
- Carmine Coppola
- 2015–2016: F24 Messina
- 2016–2019: Genoa

Senior career*
Years	Team	Apps	(Gls)
2019–	Sassuolo	2	(0)
2020–2021	→ Virtus Entella (loan)	18	(0)
2021–2022	→ Alessandria (loan)	2	(0)
2022	→ Sint-Truiden (loan)	2	(0)
2023–2024	→ Trento (loan)	34	(0)
2025–2026	→ Giugliano (loan)	12	(0)
2026	→ Cerignola (loan)	3	(0)

International career^{‡}
2017	Italy U16	4	(0)
2017–2018	Italy U17	18	(0)
2018	Italy U18	1	(0)
2018–2020	Italy U19	9	(0)
2021	Italy U21	1	(0)
Medal record
Representing Italy
UEFA European Under-17 Championship
Runner-up	England 2018	U-17 Team
- * Club domestic league appearances and goals as of 1 May 2026 ‡ National team caps and goals as of 18:41, 16 November 2021 (UTC)

Alessandro Russo (born 31 March 2001) is an Italian professional footballer who plays as a goalkeeper for Serie A club Sassuolo.

== Club career ==
Russo is a youth product of Carmine Coppola, F24 Messina, and Genoa. On 12 September 2019, Russo signed with Sassuolo. Russo made his professional debut with Sassuolo in a 2-1 Coppa Italia loss to Perugia on 4 December 2019.

On 29 August 2020, he went to Virtus Entella on loan.

On 15 July 2021, he joined Alessandria on loan. On 24 January 2022, he moved on a new loan to Sint-Truiden in Belgium.

Russo spent the 2022–23 season back with Sassuolo as a back-up to Andrea Consigli. Russo made his Serie A debut in the last league game of the season on 2 June 2023 against Fiorentina.

On 12 July 2023, Russo moved to Serie C club Trento on a season-long loan.

On 27 August 2025, Russo joined Giugliano on loan.

== Personal life ==
On 12 October 2020, he tested positive for COVID-19. He tested negative 18 days later.

== Career statistics ==
As of match played 7 May 2024

Appearances and goals by club, season and competition
Club	Season	League			National cup		Continental		Other		Total	
Club	Season	Division	Apps	Goals	Apps	Goals	Apps	Goals	Apps	Goals	Apps	Goals
Sassuolo	2018–19	Serie A	0	0	0	0	—		—		0	0
Sassuolo	2022–23	Serie A	1	0	0	0	—		—		1	0
Sassuolo	Total		1	0	0	0	—		—		1	0
Virtus Entella (loan)	2020–21	Serie B	18	0	2	0	—		—		20	0
Alessandria (loan)	2021–22	Serie B	2	0	0	0	—		—		2	0
Sint-Truiden (loan)	2021–22	Belgian First Division A	2	0	—		—		—		2	0
Trento (loan)	2023–24	Serie C	34	0	—		—		1	0	35	0
Career total			57	0	2	0	0	0	1	0	60	0

== Honours ==
Sassuolo

- Serie B: 2024–25
