= US Sassuolo Calcio =

Association football club based in Sassuolo, Italy

Sassuolo
- Full name: Unione Sportiva Sassuolo; Calcio S.r.l.
- Nicknames: I Neroverdi (The Black and Greens)
- Founded: 1920; 106 years ago, as Sassuolo FC; 1974; 52 years ago, as US Sassuolo
- Stadium: Mapei Stadium – Città del Tricolore
- Capacity: 21,584
- Owner: Mapei S.p.A.
- President: Carlo Rossi
- Head coach: Roberto D'Aversa
- League: Serie A
- 2025–26: Serie A, 11th of 20
- Website: www.sassuolocalcio.it
Home colours	Away colours	Third colours

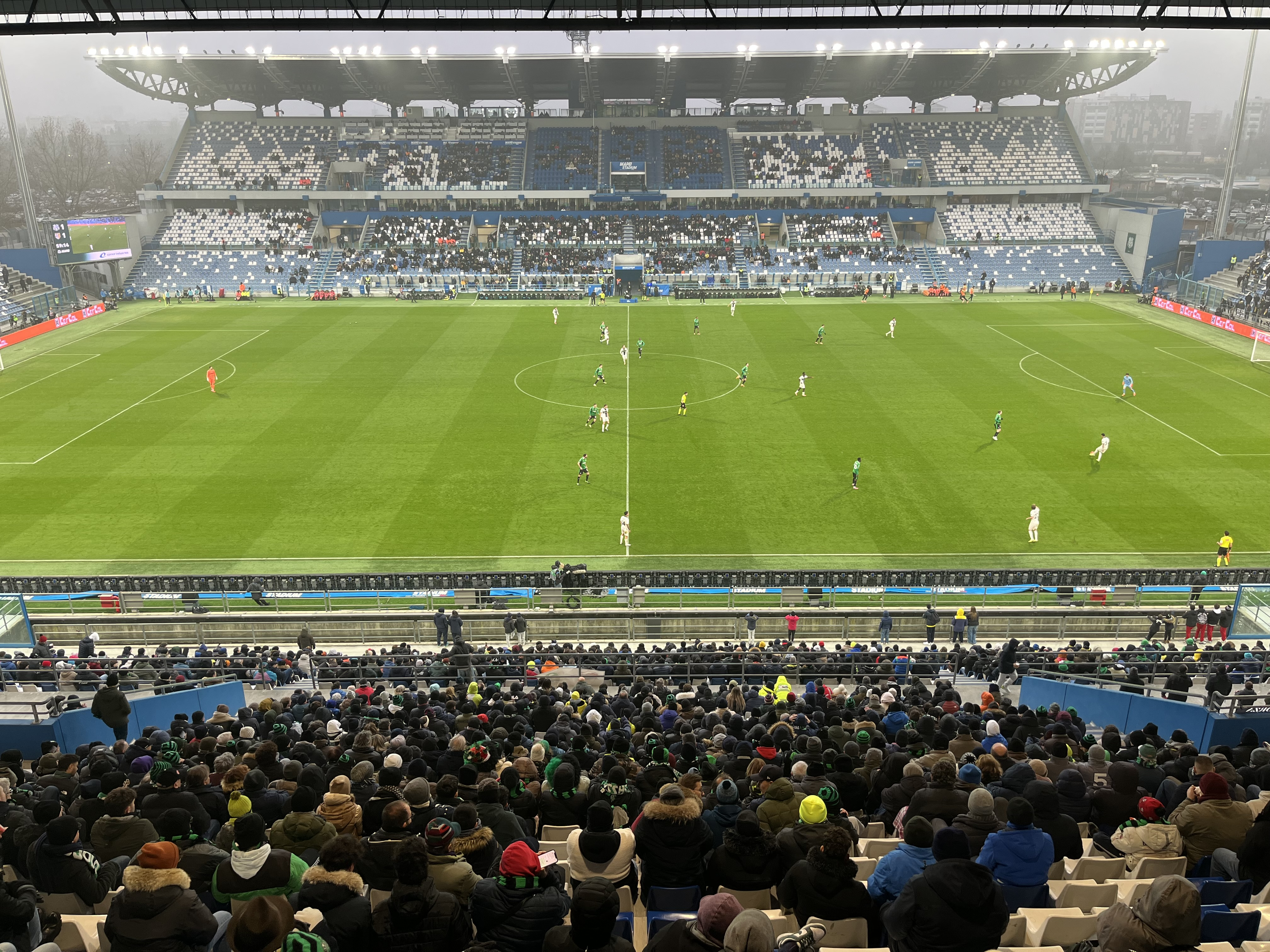
A view from the grandstand of Mapei Stadium during a Serie A match between Sassuolo Calcio and Parma Calcio in January 2026.

Unione Sportiva Sassuolo Calcio, commonly known as Sassuolo (Italian pronunciation: [sasˈswɔːlo]), is a professional football club based in Sassuolo, Emilia-Romagna, Italy. The team's colours are black and green, which have earned them the nickname Neroverdi ("black and greens"). Sassuolo competes in Serie A, the highest division in the Italian football league system.

The club made its debut in Serie A during the 2013–14 season, becoming one of the few teams to compete in the top division without representing a provincial capital. (Note: Empoli, Legnano, Pro Patria (Busto Arsizio), Carpi, and Casale.) Sassuolo remained in Serie A until the 2023–24 season, when they were relegated to Serie B. They returned to the top flight after one season.

== History ==
The club was founded in 1920 and played in the Emilian amateur divisions for most of its history until its first promotion to Serie D in 1968. In this era, the club merged with other local football teams to eventually form US Sassuolo Calcio in 1974. In 1984, the club gained promotion to Serie C2, the lowest level of professional football in Italy. However, they were relegated in 1990 and subsequently spent most of the 1990s in Serie D. In 1998, a second-place finish ensured promotion back to Serie C2.

=== Serie C1 (2006–2008) ===
Sassuolo reached Serie C1 for the first time in 2006 after winning the Serie C2 promotion play-offs by beating Sansovino in the final. In the following years, Sassuolo proved to be a serious contender for promotion to Serie B. With Gian Marco Remondina as head coach, they narrowly missed it in 2007, as they lost immediate promotion to Grosseto in the final days of the season, finishing in second-place; and then were defeated by fifth-placed Monza in the play-off semi-finals. Remondina then left Sassuolo to join Serie B's Piacenza, and former Serie A player Massimiliano Allegri was chosen as new head coach.

Under Allegri, Sassuolo quickly revived their hopes to obtain promotion to Serie B; this ultimately materialized on 27 April 2008, when they won the Serie C1/A title, thus ensuring a historical promotion to Serie B, the first in the club's history.

=== Serie B (2008–2013) ===
Following Sassuolo's promotion to the Italian second tier, Allegri left Sassuolo to fill the head coaching position at Serie A team Cagliari. In July 2008, the club appointed former Atalanta and Siena boss Andrea Mandorlini for the 2008–09 season.

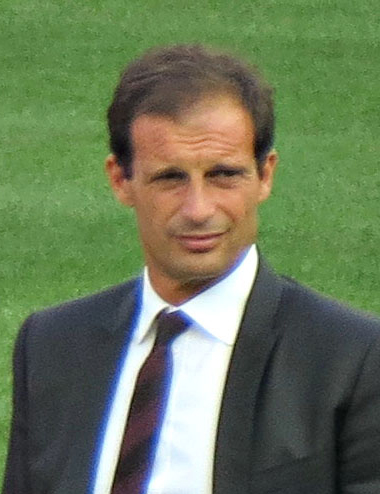
Massimiliano Allegri, manager of Sassuolo in 2008 who won promotion to Serie B, winning group A of Serie C1 and the Supercoppa Lega Pro

Sassuolo had a surprisingly good start to the 2008–09 campaign and held a promotion playoff place for a very long time. They only won two points in their last five matches to eventually finish in seventh place. Despite a successful season, Mandorlini left Sassuolo by mutual consent in June 2009, whereupon the team then appointed former Piacenza coach Stefano Pioli on 11 June 2009.

Sassuolo successively qualified to the Serie B promotion playoffs in 2009–10 by placing fourth, and 2011–12 in third, being eliminated at the semi-finals in both seasons.

In the 2012–13 season, however, under the guidance of new head coach Eusebio Di Francesco, Sassuolo played a majority of the season in first place in the table, and eventually secured direct promotion with a 1–0 victory over Livorno on 18 May 2013. At the conclusion of the season, Sassuolo had won the Serie B title and had ensured a first top-flight campaign ever for the 2013–14 season. The club had reached the highest level of the Italian football league system only seven years after playing in Serie C2. The key role that was played in this achievement by 18-year-old academy product Domenico Berardi saw the player win the league's Player of the Year award.

=== Serie A (2013–2024; 2025–present) ===
During pre-season training in July 2013, Sassuolo won the TIM Trophy after beating Juventus on penalties then beating AC Milan 2–1, marking the first time a team other than Milan, Inter Milan or Juventus have won the Cup.

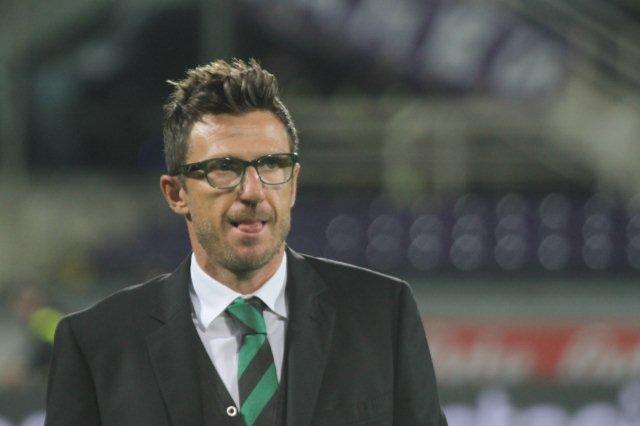
Eusebio Di Francesco, manager of the historic promotion to Serie A for the Neroverdi in 2013

On 25 August 2013, Sassuolo played their first-ever Serie A match, a 2–0 loss away at Torino. The team's second match was their first at home, against Livorno, where striker Simone Zaza scored Sassuolo's first top-flight goal as they lost 4–1. On 22 September 2013, Sassuolo endured a heavy 7–0 defeat at home to Inter. The team earned their first point in their fifth match, on 25 September away to Napoli. Zaza equalised as the game finished 1–1, ending the hosts' perfect start to the season. This was followed by a first home point on 29 September, a 2–2 draw with Lazio. On 20 October 2013, Sassuolo won their first Serie A game, defeating Bologna 2–1 at home with goals from Domenico Berardi and Antonio Floro Flores, moving the club off bottom place. Sassuolo won away for the first time in Serie A on 3 November against Sampdoria, with Berardi scoring their first top-flight hat-trick to win 4–3. Since the following match, a 1–1 draw at Roma on 10 November, the club was outside the relegation zone. On 12 January 2014, Berardi was the only player in the season to score four goals in a game, as Sassuolo came from 2–0 down to win 4–3 against Milan. Towards the end of January 2014, Sassuolo were in bottom place and so manager Di Francesco was relieved of his duties and Alberto Malesani was brought in. The managerial change did not have the desired effects and so in early March, Sassuolo re-entrusted the side to the management of Di Francesco. Sassuolo won its away match against Fiorentina 4–3 on 6 May 2014, and after winning 4–2 against Genoa on 11 May, Sassuolo guaranteed its place in Serie A for the 2014–15 season. Berardi finished in equal 7th place in the Serie A top scorers list, with 16 goals for the season.

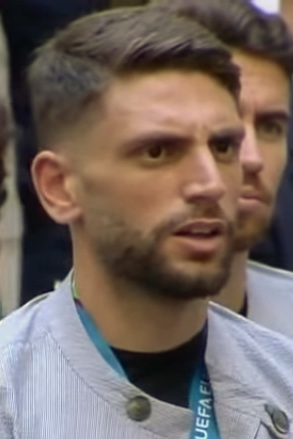
Domenico Berardi began his club career with Sassuolo in 2012, helping the team win the Serie B title and earn promotion to Serie A in his debut season. He is Sassuolo's all-time top scorer, with over 100 goals in all competitions.

The Neroverdi had a much better 2014–15 Serie A season, finishing comfortably beyond relegation in 12th place. Berardi was once more the club's top goalscorer with 15 league goals.

Sassuolo improved again in the 2015–16 Serie A season, finishing ahead of the likes of Milan and Lazio in sixth place. The season included an opening day win over Napoli, a Round 10 1–0 victory over Juventus at Mapei Stadium and a 1–0 victory over Inter at the San Siro.

On 21 May 2016, Sassuolo achieved their first ever Europa League qualification after finishing sixth in 2015–16 courtesy of a Juventus Coppa Italia win over Milan as Milan would have gone to Europe instead if they had won the final. On 25 August 2016, Sassuolo qualified for the Europa League group stage after beating Red Star Belgrade 4–1 on aggregate in the playoff round.

Over the following three seasons, the Neroverdi returned to mid-table, ending the 2016–17 season in 12th position, and then the club followed this up with consecutive 11th-place finishes in 2018 and 2019, as well being knocked out in the round of 16 in three successive Coppa Italia campaigns. In the home match against Lazio on 25 February 2018, club captain Francesco Magnanelli made his 400th appearance for Sassuolo since joining the club's in its most recent spell in Serie C2 in 2005, having led the Neroverdi through three promotions and also playing in European competition in that time. On 13 June 2018, Roberto De Zerbi was appointed as manager, after impressing with his possession-based tactics at relegated Benevento in the previous season.

The 2019–20 season oversaw an improvement in Sassuolo's fortunes. The club concluded the season in 8th position, just outside the final qualifying position for the UEFA Europa League, marking only the second top-half Serie A finish in its history. A primary reason for Sassuolo's growth was due to De Zerbi's innovative, attack-minded style of play, which began to flourish and led to a record-breaking Serie A goal return of 69, the most prolific the club has been since promotion in 2013. The transfer of Francesco Caputo from Empoli in the preceding off-season was particularly crucial to this, as the striker ended the campaign with 21 league goals, and wingers Jérémie Boga and Domenico Berardi also achieved double-figure goal tallies.

The club continued its development as a top 10 team in Serie A in the following season, in which the record of 61 points in 2015–16 was broken with another 8th-place finish on 62 points. After eight matches, Sassuolo was placed second in the table, which in part was the result of the excellent form of the likes of Berardi, Manuel Locatelli, Filip Đuričić, amongst others. An impressive 2–0 away win against Napoli on matchday six was perhaps the best reflection of this impressive early-season form. Although the club's form declined slightly in the mid-stage of the season, a 2–0 victory over Lazio on the final matchday meant that Sassuolo reached the same points total as Roma in 7th place, but narrowly missed out on European qualification on goal difference. Berardi, in his eighth professional season with the club, enjoyed the best year of his career with 17 league goals and his double in a 3–1 against Fiorentina on 17 April 2021 meant that he had reached 100 goals in all competitions for the Neroverdi. De Zerbi announced he would leave the club at the end of the season to take up the vacant head coach position at Shakhtar Donetsk. On 11 July 2021, Sassuolo's Manuel Locatelli, Domenico Berardi and Giacomo Raspadori were part of the Italy national squad that defeated England in the UEFA Euro 2020 final.

In the 2023–24 season, Sassuolo finished 19th on the table and were relegated to Serie B ending their 11-year stay in the top flight. They immediately won the Serie B in 2025 and were promoted back to Serie A.

== Stadium and kit ==
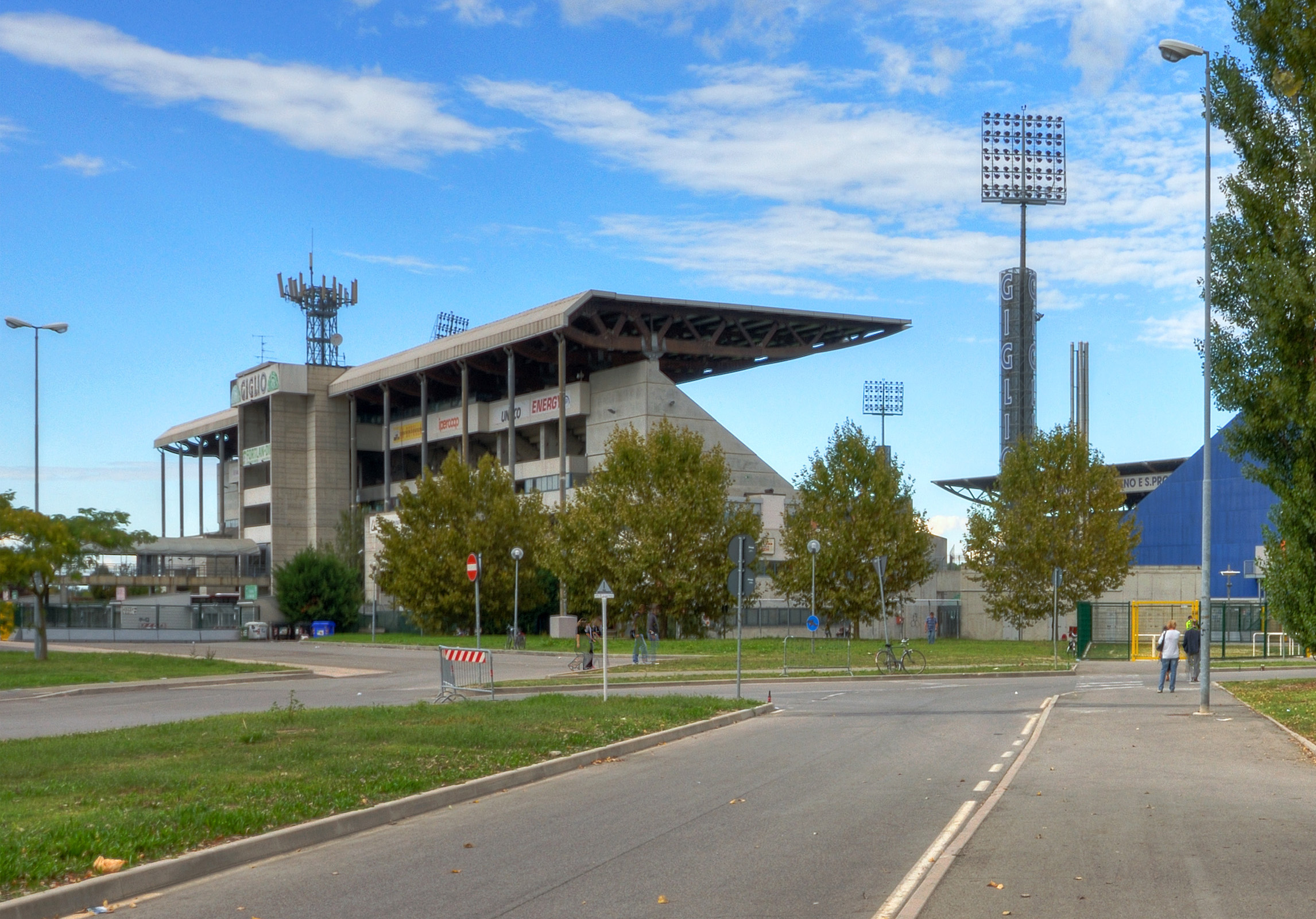
Stadio Città del Tricolore

Sassuolo's home stadium is the Stadio Enzo Ricci in Sassuolo, still used by the club for training, but due to its tiny capacity (4,000) the club played Serie B seasons in Modena's Stadio Alberto Braglia.

Starting from the 2013–14 season, the first Serie A campaign for the club, Sassuolo plays in Reggio Emilia at the renovated Mapei Stadium – Città del Tricolore (formerly Stadio Giglio) in a venue-sharing agreement with Serie B club Reggiana. The stadium was also bought by the parent company of Sassuolo, Mapei.

The club first wore yellow and red, the colours of the coat of arms of the city of Sassuolo. Sassuolo begin wearing its present colours of green and black during the 1970–71 Serie D season. Some media reports saying the club has worn green and black since the 1920s as a result of an English touring team called 'Lancaster Rovers' are erroneous.

== Players ==
=== Current squad ===
As of 1 September 2026

Note: Flags indicate national team as defined under FIFA eligibility rules; some limited exceptions apply. Players may hold more than one non-FIFA nationality.

No.	Pos.	Nation	Player
3	DF	SCO	Josh Doig
5	DF	GBS	Fali Candé
6	DF	POL	Sebastian Walukiewicz
7	FW	AUS	Cristian Volpato
8	MF	ITA	Andrea Ghion
9	FW	SCO	Kieron Bowie (on loan from Hellas Verona)
10	FW	ITA	Domenico Berardi (captain)
11	MF	ROU	Daniel Boloca
12	GK	ITA	Giacomo Satalino
15	DF	CRO	Duje Ćaleta-Car
16	DF	BEL	Fedde Leysen (on loan from Union SG)
17	MF	MNE	Vasilije Adžić (on loan from Juventus)
18	MF	SRB	Nemanja Matić
19	FW	DEN	Laurs Skjellerup
20	DF	BEL	Ignace Van Der Brempt (on loan from Como)
21	DF	IDN	Jay Idzes
22	GK	ITA	Lorenzo Nyarko

No.	Pos.	Nation	Player
25	FW	ARG	Benja Domínguez (on loan from Bologna)
26	DF	NED	Cas Odenthal
27	DF	COL	Yeferson Paz
33	DF	ESP	Rafa Obrador (on loan from Benfica)
35	MF	ITA	Luca Lipani
36	DF	ITA	Giorgio Vezzosi
42	MF	NOR	Kristian Thorstvedt
45	FW	FRA	Armand Laurienté
46	DF	ITA	Simone Cinquegrano
49	GK	KOS	Arijanet Muric
50	MF	FRA	Darryl Bakola
55	MF	GHA	Ibrahim Sulemana (on loan from Atalanta)
77	FW	ITA	Nicholas Pierini
80	GK	ITA	Stefano Turati
90	MF	CAN	Ismaël Koné
94	FW	ITA	Sebastiano Esposito (on loan from Cagliari)

=== Sassuolo Primavera ===
Note: Flags indicate national team as defined under FIFA eligibility rules; some limited exceptions apply. Players may hold more than one non-FIFA nationality.

No.	Pos.	Nation	Player
14	FW	ALB	Gabriel Kulla

=== Other players under contract ===
As of 1 September 2026

Note: Flags indicate national team as defined under FIFA eligibility rules; some limited exceptions apply. Players may hold more than one non-FIFA nationality.

No. / Pos. / Nation / Player; — / GK / ITA / Alessandro Russo	No. / Pos. / Nation / Player; — / DF / ITA / Edoardo Pieragnolo

=== Out on loan ===
As of 31 August 2026

Note: Flags indicate national team as defined under FIFA eligibility rules; some limited exceptions apply. Players may hold more than one non-FIFA nationality.

No.	Pos.	Nation	Player
—	GK	ITA	Gioele Zacchi (at Union Brescia until 30 June 2027)
—	DF	ITA	Francesco Corradini (at Pineto until 30 June 2027)
—	DF	ITA	Alessandro Di Bitonto (at Avellino until 30 June 2027)
—	DF	ITA	Tommaso Macchioni (at Carrarese until 30 June 2027)
—	DF	ITA	Kevin Miranda (at Cerignola until 30 June 2027)
—	DF	ITA	Filippo Missori (at Avellino until 30 June 2027)
—	MF	ITA	Kevin Bruno (at Vado until 30 June 2027)
—	MF	ITA	Justin Kumi (at Juve Stabia until 30 June 2027)
—	MF	ITA	Kevin Leone (at Arezzo until 30 June 2027)

No.	Pos.	Nation	Player
—	MF	ITA	Patrick Nuamah (at Sabadell until 30 June 2027)
—	FW	URU	Agustín Álvarez (at Talleres until 30 June 2027)
—	FW	MTQ	Janis Antiste (at Górnik Zabrze until 30 June 2027)
—	FW	ITA	Riccardo Ciervo (at Cagliari until 30 June 2027)
—	FW	ITA	Luca D'Andrea (at Cesena until 30 June 2027)
—	FW	GHA	Amoako Minta (at Gubbio until 30 June 2027)
—	FW	ITA	Samuele Mulattieri (at Hellas Verona until 30 June 2027)
—	FW	ITA	Flavio Russo (at Catania until 30 June 2027)

== Coaching staff ==
As of 11 November 2026

Position	Staff
Head coach	Roberto D'Aversa
Assistant coach	Vacant
Goalkeeping coach	Vacant
Technical coach	Vacant
Athletic coach	Vacant
Match analyst	Vacant
Rehab coach	Vacant
Head of medical staff	(Italy) Dott. Roberto D’Ovidio
Club doctor	(Italy) Dott. Luca Terzi
Nutritionist	(Italy) Davide Tonelli
Physiotherapist	(Italy) Emanuele Randelli (Italy) Nicola Daprile (Italy) Luca Attolini (Italy) Luca Traggiai

== Coaches ==
- Ezio Pascutti (1986–87)
- Loris Boni (1997–98)
- Stefano Garuti
- Roberto Busi
- Gianni Balugani
- Daniele Simeoni
- Fabio Bedogni
- Paolo Magnani (2000 – 26 March 2002)
- Oscar Lamagni
- Cesare Maestroni (2002 – 13 January 2003)
- Cristiano Bergodi (1 July 2003 – 30 June 2004)
- Giuseppe Brucato (1 July 2004 – 30 June 2005)
- Gian Marco Remondina (1 July 2005 – 30 June 2007)
- Massimiliano Allegri (17 July 2007 – 28 May 2008)
- Andrea Mandorlini (7 July 2008 – 30 June 2009)
- Stefano Pioli (12 June 2009 – 9 June 2010)
- Daniele Arrigoni (26 June 2010 – 3 October 2010)
- Angelo Gregucci (3 October 2010 – 9 May 2011)
- Paolo Mandelli (9 May 2011 – 9 June 2011)
- Fulvio Pea (9 June 2011 – 10 June 2012)
- Eusebio Di Francesco (19 June 2012 – 28 January 2014)
- Alberto Malesani (29 January 2014 – 3 March 2014)
- Eusebio Di Francesco (3 March 2014 – 13 June 2017)
- Cristian Bucchi (20 June 2017 – 27 November 2017)
- Giuseppe Iachini (27 November 2017 – 5 June 2018)
- Roberto De Zerbi (13 June 2018 – 25 May 2021)
- Alessio Dionisi (16 June 2021 – 25 February 2024)
- Emiliano Bigica (25 February 2024 – 1 March 2024)
- Davide Ballardini (1 March 2024 – 30 June 2024)
- Fabio Grosso (1 July 2024 – 4 June 2026)
- Alberto Aquilani (12 June 2026 – 9 November 2026)
- Roberto D'Aversa (11 November 2026 – present)

Results of league and cup competitions by season
Season	Division	Pld	W	D	L	GF	GA	Pts	Pos	Cup	Supercoppa Italiana	Cup	Result	Player(s)	Goals
Season	League									Cup	Supercoppa Italiana	UEFA – FIFA		Top goalscorer(s)	
2023–24	Serie A (1)	38	7	9	22	43	75	30	19th	R16				Andrea Pinamonti	12
2022–23	Serie A (1)	38	12	9	17	47	61	45	13th	R64				Domenico Berardi	13
2021–22	Serie A (1)	38	13	11	14	64	66	50	11th	QF				Gianluca Scamacca	16
2020–21	Serie A (1)	38	17	11	10	64	56	62	8th	R16				Domenico Berardi	17
2019–20	Serie A (1)	38	14	9	15	69	63	51	8th	4R				Francesco Caputo	21
2018–19	Serie A (1)	38	9	16	13	53	60	43	11th	R16				Domenico Berardi	10
2017–18	Serie A (1)	38	11	10	17	29	59	43	11th	R16				Matteo Politano	11
2016–17	Serie A (1)	38	13	7	18	58	63	46	12th	R16		Europa League	Group stage	Grégoire Defrel	16
2015–16	Serie A (1)	38	16	13	9	49	40	61	6th	4R				Domenico Berardi Grégoire Defrel Nicola Sansone	7
2014–15	Serie A (1)	38	12	13	13	49	57	49	12th	R16				Domenico Berardi	15

== Honours ==
=== League ===
- Serie B:
  - Winners: 2012–13, 2024–25
- Serie C1:
  - Winners: 2007–08 North
- Serie D:
  - Winners: 1983–84 Emilia zone, 1997–98 Emilia zone,
- Promozione Emilia-Romagna:
  - Winners: 1980–81

=== Cups ===
- Supercoppa di Serie C:
  - Winners: 2008

== In Europe ==
Season	Competition	Round	Club	Home	Away	Agg.	Ref.
2016–17	Europa League	QR3	(Switzerland) Luzern	3–0	1–1	4–1	
2016–17	Europa League	PO	(Serbia) Red Star Belgrade	3–0	1–1	4–1	
2016–17	Europa League	GS	(Spain) Athletic Bilbao	3–0	2–3	4th out of 4	
2016–17	Europa League	GS	(Belgium) Genk	0–2	1–3	4th out of 4	
2016–17	Europa League	GS	(Austria) Rapid Wien	2–2	1–1	4th out of 4	
