= 2021–22 US Sassuolo Calcio season =

U.S. Sassuolo Calcio
2021–22 season
- Owner: Mapei
- Chairman: Carlo Rossi
- Head coach: Alessio Dionisi
- Stadium: Mapei Stadium – Città del Tricolore
- Serie A: 11th
- Coppa Italia: Quarter-finals
- Top goalscorer: League: Gianluca Scamacca (16); All: Gianluca Scamacca (16)
Home colours	Away colours	Third colours

The 2021–22 season was the 102nd season in the existence of U.S. Sassuolo Calcio and the club's ninth consecutive season in the top flight of Italian football. In addition to the domestic league, Sassuolo participated in this season's edition of the Coppa Italia.

== Players ==
=== First-team squad ===
As of 31 January 2022

Note: Flags indicate national team as defined under FIFA eligibility rules; some limited exceptions apply. Players may hold more than one non-FIFA nationality.

No.	Pos.	Nation	Player
4	MF	ITA	Francesco Magnanelli (captain)
5	DF	TUR	Kaan Ayhan
6	DF	BRA	Rogério
7	FW	ITA	Brian Oddei
8	MF	FRA	Maxime Lopez
10	MF	SRB	Filip Đuričić
11	FW	ITA	Riccardo Ciervo (on loan from Roma)
13	DF	ITA	Federico Peluso
14	MF	GEQ	Pedro Obiang
15	FW	NOR	Emil Ceïde (on loan from Rosenborg)
16	MF	ITA	Davide Frattesi
17	DF	TUR	Mert Müldür
18	FW	ITA	Giacomo Raspadori (3rd captain)
19	DF	ITA	Filippo Romagna
20	MF	MAR	Abdou Harroui (on loan from Sparta Rotterdam)

No.	Pos.	Nation	Player
21	DF	ROU	Vlad Chiricheș
22	DF	GER	Jeremy Toljan
23	MF	CIV	Hamed Traorè
24	GK	ITA	Giacomo Satalino
25	FW	ITA	Domenico Berardi
29	FW	ITA	Luigi Samele
31	DF	ITA	Gian Marco Ferrari (vice-captain)
44	DF	BRA	Ruan
47	GK	ITA	Andrea Consigli
56	GK	ITA	Gianluca Pegolo
68	DF	GHA	Salim Abubakar
77	DF	GRE	Giorgos Kyriakopoulos
91	FW	ITA	Gianluca Scamacca
92	FW	FRA	Grégoire Defrel
97	MF	BRA	Matheus Henrique (on loan from Grêmio)

=== Other players under contract ===
Note: Flags indicate national team as defined under FIFA eligibility rules; some limited exceptions apply. Players may hold more than one non-FIFA nationality.

No.	Pos.	Nation	Player
—	FW	URU	Nicolás Schiappacasse

=== Out on loan ===
As of 7 February 2022

Note: Flags indicate national team as defined under FIFA eligibility rules; some limited exceptions apply. Players may hold more than one non-FIFA nationality.

No.	Pos.	Nation	Player
—	GK	ITA	Matteo Campani (at Vis Pesaro until 30 June 2022)
—	GK	ITA	Alessandro Russo (at (Belgium) Sint-Truiden until 30 June 2022)
—	GK	ITA	Stefano Turati (at Reggina until 30 June 2022)
—	DF	ITA	Claud Adjapong (at Reggina until 30 June 2022)
—	DF	ITA	Giuseppe Aurelio (at Gubbio until 30 June 2022)
—	DF	ITA	Martin Erlic (at Spezia until 30 June 2022)
—	DF	ITA	Davide Manarelli (at Renate until 30 June 2022)
—	DF	ITA	Riccardo Marchizza (at Empoli until 30 June 2022)
—	DF	ITA	Andrea Meroni (at Cremonese until 30 June 2022)
—	DF	ITA	Stefano Piccinini (at Vis Pesaro until 30 June 2022)
—	DF	ITA	Alessandro Pilati (at Mantova until 30 June 2022)
—	DF	ITA	Matteo Pinelli (at (Slovenia) NK Krško until 30 June 2022)
—	DF	ITA	Matteo Saccani (at Vis Pesaro until 30 June 2022)
—	DF	ITA	Leonardo Sernicola (at Cremonese until 30 June 2022)
—	MF	ITA	Federico Artioli (at Grosseto until 30 June 2022)
—	MF	MAR	Mehdi Bourabia (at Spezia until 30 June 2022)

No.	Pos.	Nation	Player
—	MF	CIV	Jérémie Boga (at Atalanta until 30 June 2022)
—	MF	ITA	Andrea Ghion (at Perugia until 30 June 2022)
—	MF	SVK	Lukáš Haraslín (at (Czech Republic) Sparta Prague until 30 June 2022)
—	MF	ITA	Manuel Locatelli (at Juventus until 30 June 2023)
—	MF	ROU	Andrei Mărginean (at ACR Messina until 30 June 2022)
—	MF	ITA	Alessandro Mercati (at Montevarchi until 30 June 2022)
—	MF	ITA	Marco Pinato (at Pordenone until 30 June 2022)
—	MF	ITA	Marco Sala (at Crotone until 30 June 2022)
—	FW	ITA	Enrico Brignola (at Benevento until 30 June 2022)
—	FW	ITA	Francesco Caputo (at Sampdoria until 30 June 2022)
—	FW	URU	Emiliano Gómez (at (Spain) Albacete until 30 June 2022)
—	FW	ITA	Giacomo Manzari (at Frosinone until 30 June 2023)
—	FW	ITA	Andrea Mattioli (at Pontedera until 30 June 2022)
—	FW	ITA	Luca Moro (at Catania until 30 June 2022)
—	FW	DEN	Jens Odgaard (at (Netherlands) RKC Waalwijk until 30 June 2022)
—	FW	ITA	Jacopo Pellegrini (at Pordenone until 30 June 2022)

== Transfers ==
=== In ===
No.	Pos	Player	Transferred from	Fee	Date	Source
15	DF	(Germany) Jeremy Toljan	(Germany) Borussia Dortmund	€3,500,000	1 July 2021	

=== Out ===
No.	Pos	Player	Transferred from	Fee	Date	Source
73	MF	(Italy) Manuel Locatelli	Juventus	Loan (Note: With obligation to buy in 2023 for €25M + €12.5M variables)	18 August 2021	

== Pre-season and friendlies ==
Win Draw Loss Fixtures

24 July 2021 Friendly	Sassuolo (Italy)	0–0	(Italy) Südtirol	Sterzing, Italy
18:45 CEST (UTC+2)		Report		Stadium: Centro Sportivo di Vipiteno; Referee: Bogdan Sfira

1 August 2021 Friendly	Parma (Italy)	0–3	(Italy) Sassuolo	Parma, Italy
21:30 CEST (UTC+2)	Balogh (red card) 62'	Report	Đuričić 18', 75'; Manzari 88'	Stadium: Stadio Ennio Tardini; Referee: Antonio Di Martino

7 August 2021 Friendly	Sassuolo (Italy)	3–1	(Italy) Vicenza	Sassuolo, Italy
18:00 CEST (UTC+2)	Haraslín 7'; Boga 51'; Raspadori 53'	Report	Diaw 24' (pen.)	Stadium: Stadio Enzo Ricci; Referee: Antonio Rapuano

14 August 2021 Friendly	Lazio (Italy)	1–1	(Italy) Sassuolo	Frosinone, Italy
19:00 CEST (UTC+2)	Akpa Akpro 31'		Traorè 45'	Stadium: Stadio Benito Stirpe; Referee: Matteo Marchetti

4 September 2021 Friendly	Sassuolo (Italy)	0–2	(Italy) Cremonese	Sassuolo, Italy
17:00 CEST (UTC+2)		Report	Di Carmine 12' (pen.); Gaetano 34'	Stadium: Stadio Enzo Ricci; Referee: Tommaso Zamagni

== Competitions ==
=== Overview ===
Competition	First match	Last match	Starting round	Final position	Record							
Competition	First match	Last match	Starting round	Final position	Pld	W	D	L	GF	GA	GD	Win %
Serie A	21 August 2021	22 May 2022	Matchday 1	11th	38	13	11	14	64	66	−2	34.21
Coppa Italia	19 January 2022	10 February 2022	Round of 16	Quarter-finals	2	1	0	1	2	2	+0	50.00
Total					40	14	11	15	66	68	−2	35.00

Source: Soccerway

=== Serie A ===
==== League table ====
Pos	Team	Pld	W	D	L	GF	GA	GD	Pts
9	Hellas Verona	38	14	11	13	65	59	+6	53
10	Torino	38	13	11	14	46	41	+5	50 (Note: Torino finished ahead of Sassuolo on head-to-head points: Sassuolo 0–1 Torino, Torino 1–1 Sassuolo.)
11	Sassuolo	38	13	11	14	64	66	−2	50
12	Udinese	38	11	14	13	61	58	+3	47
13	Bologna	38	12	10	16	44	55	−11	46

Source: Serie A
Rules for classification: 1) Points; 2) Head-to-head points; 3) Head-to-head goal difference; 4) Goal difference; 5) Goals scored; 6) Draw. (Note: Head-to-head record is used only after all the matches between the teams in question have been played)

==== Results summary ====
Overall								Home						Away					
Pld	W	D	L	GF	GA	GD	Pts	W	D	L	GF	GA	GD	W	D	L	GF	GA	GD
38	13	11	14	64	66	−2	50	6	6	7	27	30	−3	7	5	7	37	36	+1

Source: Serie A

==== Results by round ====
Round	1	2	3	4	5	6	7	8	9	10	11	12	13	14	15	16	17	18	19	20	21	22	23	24	25	26	27	28	29	30	31	32	33	34	35	36	37	38
Ground	A	H	A	H	A	H	H	A	H	A	H	A	H	A	H	A	H	A	H	H	A	H	A	A	H	A	H	A	A	H	A	H	A	H	A	H	A	H
Result	W	D	L	L	L	W	L	D	W	W	L	L	D	W	D	D	W	D	L	D	W	L	D	L	D	W	W	W	D	W	L	W	L	L	L	D	W	L
Position	6	8	9	12	14	12	14	14	13	9	13	13	13	12	12	12	12	11	13	13	10	12	11	12	12	11	10	10	10	9	10	9	10	10	11	11	11	11

Source: Serie A
A = Away; H = Home; W = Win; D = Draw; L = Loss

==== Matches ====
The league fixtures were announced on 14 July 2021.

21 August 2021 1	Hellas Verona	2–3	Sassuolo	Verona
18:30 CEST (UTC+2)	Veloso (yellow card) 35' (yellow-red card) 45+1'; Zaccagni 70' (pen.), 90'; Di Carmine (yellow card) 75'	Report	Lopez (yellow card) 23'; Raspadori 32'; Đuričić 51', (yellow card) 79'; Traorè 77'	Stadium: Stadio Marcantonio Bentegodi; Attendance: 5,448; Referee: Manuel Volpi

29 August 2021 2	Sassuolo	0–0	Sampdoria	Reggio Emilia
18:30 CEST (UTC+2)	Caputo (yellow card) 49'; Chiricheș (yellow card) 78'	Report	Bereszyński (yellow card) 41'; Thorsby (yellow card) 90+3'	Stadium: Mapei Stadium – Città del Tricolore; Attendance: 3,309; Referee: Juan Luca Sacchi

12 September 2021 3	Roma	2–1	Sassuolo	Rome
20:45 CEST (UTC+2)	Cristante 37', (yellow card) 66'; Ibañez (yellow card) 43'; El Shaarawy 90+1'	Report	Chiricheș (yellow card) 36'; Đuričić 57'	Stadium: Stadio Olimpico; Attendance: 29,604; Referee: Simone Sozza

17 September 2021 4	Sassuolo	0–1	Torino	Reggio Emilia
20:45 CEST (UTC+2)		Report	Bremer (yellow card) 12'; Aina (yellow card) 35'; Rodriguez (yellow card) 54'; Pjaca 83'; Djidji (yellow card) 90+5'	Stadium: Mapei Stadium – Città del Tricolore; Attendance: 4,090; Referee: Marco Piccinini

21 September 2021 5	Atalanta	2–1	Sassuolo	Bergamo
20:45 CEST (UTC+2)	Gosens 3'; Zappacosta 37'; Malinovskyi (yellow card) 61'; Pezzella (yellow card) 74'	Report	Ferrari (yellow card) 25'; Berardi 44'; Lopez (yellow card) 90+1'	Stadium: Gewiss Stadium; Attendance: 7,353; Referee: Davide Massa

26 September 2021 6	Sassuolo	1–0	Salernitana	Reggio Emilia
15:00 CEST (UTC+2)	Lopez (yellow card) 15'; Ferrari (yellow card) 31'; Berardi 54'; Scamacca (yellow card) 87'	Report	Ranieri (yellow card) 30'; Gondo (yellow card) 36'; Bonazzoli (yellow card) 89'	Stadium: Mapei Stadium – Città del Tricolore; Attendance: 5,177; Referee: Antonio Giua

2 October 2021 7	Sassuolo	1–2	Internazionale	Reggio Emilia
20:45 CEST (UTC+2)	Berardi 22' (pen.); Müldür (yellow card) 64'; Lopez (yellow card) 70'; Consigli (yellow card) 76'; Raspadori (yellow card) 80'	Report	Džeko 58'; Perišić (yellow card) 67'; Barella (yellow card) 70'; Martínez 78' (pen.)	Stadium: Mapei Stadium – Città del Tricolore; Attendance: 10,400; Referee: Luca Pairetto

17 October 2021 8	Genoa	2–2	Sassuolo	Genoa
15:00 CEST (UTC+2)	Destro 27', (yellow card) 72'; Biraschi (yellow card) 35'; Vásquez 90'; Sturaro (yellow card) 90+3'	Report	Scamacca 17', 20'; Frattesi (yellow card) 32'; Chiricheș (yellow card) 36'; Harroui (yellow card) 82'; Toljan (yellow card) 88'	Stadium: Stadio Luigi Ferraris; Attendance: 10,370; Referee: Daniele Chiffi

23 October 2021 9	Sassuolo	3–1	Venezia	Reggio Emilia
18:00 CEST (UTC+2)	Berardi 37'; Henry 50' (o.g.); Frattesi 67'; Rogério (yellow card) 78'	Report	Črnigoj (yellow card) 9'; Okereke 32'; Henry (yellow card) 39'	Stadium: Mapei Stadium – Città del Tricolore; Attendance: 4,482; Referee: Antonio Di Martino

27 October 2021 10	Juventus	1–2	Sassuolo	Turin
18:30 CEST (UTC+2)	Cuadrado (yellow card) 63'; McKennie 76'	Report	Defrel (yellow card) 30'; Frattesi 44'; Berardi (yellow card) 58'; Rogério (yellow card) 61'; Traorè (yellow card) 72'; Müldür (yellow card) 86'; Lopez 90+5'	Stadium: Juventus Stadium; Attendance: 18,288; Referee: Juan Luca Sacchi

31 October 2021 11	Sassuolo	1–2	Empoli	Reggio Emilia
15:00 CET (UTC+1)	Scamacca (yellow card) 40'; Tonelli 43' (o.g.); Raspadori (yellow card) 66'; Defrel (yellow card) 87'; Lopez (yellow card) 90'	Report	Stojanović (yellow card) 62'; Pinamonti 83' (pen.), (yellow card) 84'; Żurkowski 90+1'	Stadium: Mapei Stadium – Città del Tricolore; Attendance: 3,539; Referee: Luca Massimi

7 November 2021 12	Udinese	3–2	Sassuolo	Udine
15:00 CET (UTC+1)	Arslan (yellow card) 4'; Deulofeu 8'; Frattesi 39' (o.g.); Beto 51', (yellow card) 84'; Makengo (yellow card) 86' (yellow-red card) 89'	Report	Berardi 15'; Frattesi 28'; Ferrari (yellow card) 38'; Müldür (yellow card) 67'; Consigli (yellow card) 82'	Stadium: Stadio Friuli; Attendance: 8,322; Referee: Federico Dionisi

21 November 2021 13	Sassuolo	2–2	Cagliari	Reggio Emilia
12:30 CET (UTC+1)	Scamacca 37'; Berardi 52' (pen.); Ayhan (yellow card) 72'	Report	Marin (yellow card) 33'; Keita 40'; Grassi (yellow card) 42'; João Pedro 56' (pen.)	Stadium: Mapei Stadium – Città del Tricolore; Attendance: 4,135; Referee: Niccolò Baroni

28 November 2021 14	Milan	1–3	Sassuolo	Milan
15:00 CET (UTC+1)	Romagnoli 21', (red card) 77'; Bennacer (yellow card) 53'; Hernandez (yellow card) 54'; Tonali (yellow card) 71'; Kjær (yellow card) 73'	Report	Scamacca 24'; Lopez (yellow card) 27'; Kjær 33' (o.g.); Raspadori (yellow card) 38'; Berardi 66'	Stadium: San Siro; Attendance: 52,824; Referee: Gianluca Manganiello

1 December 2021 15	Sassuolo	2–2	Napoli	Reggio Emilia
20:45 CET (UTC+1)	Rogério (yellow card) 25'; Berardi (yellow card) 54'; Scamacca 71'; Matheus Henrique (yellow card) 87'; Ferrari 89'; Defrel (yellow card) 90+4'	Report	Fabián 51'; Mertens 59'; Politano (yellow card) 84'; Demme (yellow card) 88'	Stadium: Mapei Stadium – Città del Tricolore; Attendance: 8,192; Referee: Ivano Pezzuto

5 December 2021 16	Spezia	2–2	Sassuolo	La Spezia
15:00 CET (UTC+1)	Reca (yellow card) 1'; Maggiore (yellow card) 4'; Sala (yellow card) 26'; Manaj 35'; Gyasi 48'; Hristov (yellow card) 90'	Report	Frattesi (yellow card) 44'; Raspadori 66', 79'; Kyriakopoulos (yellow card) 74'; Berardi (yellow card) 85'	Stadium: Stadio Alberto Picco; Attendance: 4,987; Referee: Fabio Maresca

12 December 2021 17	Sassuolo	2–1	Lazio	Reggio Emilia
18:00 CET (UTC+1)	Berardi 63', (yellow card) 77'; Raspadori 69'; Ayhan (red card) 87'	Report	Zaccagni 6'; Marušić (yellow card) 39'; Anderson (yellow card) 73'	Stadium: Mapei Stadium – Città del Tricolore; Attendance: 5,346; Referee: Simone Sozza

19 December 2021 18	Fiorentina	2–2	Sassuolo	Florence
12:30 CET (UTC+1)	Biraghi (yellow card) 44' (yellow-red card) 68'; Vlahović 51'; Martínez Quarta (yellow card) 58'; Torreira 61'	Report	Toljan (yellow card) 27'; Scamacca 32', (yellow card) 59'; Frattesi 37', (yellow card) 71'; Chiricheș (yellow card) 54'; Traorè (yellow card) 56'	Stadium: Stadio Artemio Franchi; Attendance: 21,514; Referee: Marco Serra

22 December 2021 19	Sassuolo	0–3	Bologna	Reggio Emilia
16:30 CET (UTC+1)	Magnanelli (yellow card) 90'	Report	Orsolini 36'; Hickey 44'; Svanberg (yellow card) 59'; Domínguez (yellow card) 64'; Santander (yellow card) 76', (goal) 90+4'	Stadium: Mapei Stadium – Città del Tricolore; Attendance: 4,763; Referee: Michael Fabbri

6 January 2022 20	Sassuolo	1–1	Genoa	Reggio Emilia
16:30 CET (UTC+1)	Raspadori (yellow card) 21'; Berardi 55'; Rogério (yellow card) 86'; Lopez (yellow card) 90+3'	Report	Destro 7'	Stadium: Mapei Stadium – Città del Tricolore; Attendance: 4,696; Referee: Gianluca Manganiello

9 January 2022 21	Empoli	1–5	Sassuolo	Empoli
12:30 CET (UTC+1)	Henderson 16'; Viti (yellow card) 59' (yellow-red card) 61'	Report	Berardi 13' (pen.), (yellow card) 49'; Raspadori 24', 71'; Scamacca 67', 90+2'; Kyriakopoulos (yellow card) 69'; Lopez (yellow card) 79'	Stadium: Stadio Carlo Castellani; Attendance: 4,081; Referee: Manuel Volpi

16 January 2022 22	Sassuolo	2–4	Hellas Verona	Reggio Emilia
12:30 CET (UTC+1)	Scamacca 57'; Kyriakopoulos (yellow card) 59'; Defrel 64'; Ferrari (yellow card) 85'	Report	Caprari 37'; Barák 44', 57' (pen.), 90+4'; Depaoli (yellow card) 61'; Ceccherini (yellow card) 65'; Montipò (yellow card) 89'; Kalinić (yellow card) 90+1'	Stadium: Mapei Stadium – Città del Tricolore; Attendance: 3,843; Referee: Alessandro Prontera

23 January 2022 23	Torino	1–1	Sassuolo	Turin
15:00 CET (UTC+1)	Sanabria 16'; Mandragora (yellow card) 63'; Bremer (yellow card) 64'; Pobega (yellow card) 75'	Report	Rogério (yellow card) 51'; Scamacca (yellow card) 63'; Frattesi (yellow card) 86'; Raspadori 88'	Stadium: Stadio Olimpico Grande Torino; Attendance: 5,000; Referee: Francesco Fourneau

6 February 2022 24	Sampdoria	4–0	Sassuolo	Genoa
15:00 CET (UTC+1)	Caputo 5'; Sensi 7'; Candreva (yellow card) 20', (goal) 90+1' (pen.); Falcone (yellow card) 58'; Conti 63'	Report	Raspadori (yellow card) 45+4'; Scamacca (yellow card) 50'	Stadium: Stadio Luigi Ferraris; Attendance: 6,232; Referee: Fabio Maresca

13 February 2022 25	Sassuolo	2–2	Roma	Reggio Emilia
18:00 CET (UTC+1)	Ferrari (yellow card) 19' (yellow-red card) 78'; Berardi (yellow card) 45+1'; Lopez (yellow card) 45+2'; Smalling 47' (o.g.); Traorè 73'	Report	Mancini (yellow card) 21'; Abraham 45+1' (pen.); Kumbulla (yellow card) 83'; Cristante 90+4'	Stadium: Mapei Stadium – Città del Tricolore; Attendance: 9,282; Referee: Marco Guida

20 February 2022 26	Internazionale	0–2	Sassuolo	Milan
18:00 CET (UTC+1)	D'Ambrosio (yellow card) 86'	Report	Raspadori 8', (yellow card) 49'; Scamacca 26'; Müldür (yellow card) 59'	Stadium: San Siro; Attendance: 38,324; Referee: Francesco Fourneau

26 February 2022 27	Sassuolo	2–1	Fiorentina	Reggio Emilia
20:50 CET (UTC+1)	Traorè 19'; Lopez (yellow card) 70'; Defrel 90+4'	Report	Bonaventura (yellow card) 79' (yellow-red card) 80'; Cabral 88'	Stadium: Mapei Stadium – Città del Tricolore; Attendance: 8,952; Referee: Alessandro Prontera

6 March 2022 28	Venezia	1–4	Sassuolo	Venice
15:00 CET (UTC+1)	Aramu (yellow card) 17', (penalty missed) 85'; Fiordilino (yellow card) 19'; Henry 34'; Vacca (yellow card) 38'; Svoboda (yellow card) 50'	Report	Raspadori 2'; Berardi 17' (pen.), 71' (pen.); Scamacca 29' (pen.), (yellow card) 40'	Stadium: Stadio Pier Luigi Penzo; Attendance: 5,732; Referee: Luca Pairetto

12 March 2022 29	Salernitana	2–2	Sassuolo	Salerno
15:00 CET (UTC+1)	Bonazzoli 8'; Ruggeri (yellow card) 62'; Ranieri (yellow card) 80'; Đurić 82'	Report	Berardi (yellow card) 13'; Scamacca 20'; Traorè 30'; Raspadori (yellow card) 57' (yellow-red card) 59'; Lopez (yellow card) 90'	Stadium: Stadio Arechi; Attendance: 10,249; Referee: Luca Massimi

18 March 2022 30	Sassuolo	4–1	Spezia	Reggio Emilia
18:45 CET (UTC+1)	Berardi 17' (pen.), 48', (yellow card) 44'; Matheus Henrique (yellow card) 20'; Ayhan 78'; Scamacca 81'	Report	Kovalenko (yellow card) 15'; Verde 36'; Maggiore (yellow card) 55'; Erlić (yellow card) 80'	Stadium: Mapei Stadium – Città del Tricolore; Attendance: 6,130; Referee: Manuel Volpi

2 April 2022 31	Lazio	2–1	Sassuolo	Rome
18:00 CEST (UTC+2)	Felipe Anderson (yellow card) 7'; Lazzari 17'; Milinković-Savić 51'	Report	Kyriakopoulos (yellow card) 5'; Frattesi (yellow card) 32'; Harroui (yellow card) 84'; Traorè 90+5'	Stadium: Stadio Olimpico; Attendance: 15,000; Referee: Antonio Rapuano

10 April 2022 32	Sassuolo	2–1	Atalanta	Reggio Emilia
15:00 CEST (UTC+2)	Traorè 24', 61'; Matheus Henrique (yellow card) 39'; Müldür (yellow card) 63'	Report	Zappacosta (yellow card) 90+2'; Muriel 90+3'	Stadium: Mapei Stadium – Città del Tricolore; Attendance: 7,842; Referee: Juan Luca Sacchi

16 April 2022 33	Cagliari	1–0	Sassuolo	Cagliari
12:30 CEST (UTC+2)	Deiola 42'; Lovato (yellow card) 45+5'; Pereiro (yellow card) 90+4'	Report	Ruan (yellow card) 27'; Traorè (yellow card) 45+5'	Stadium: Unipol Domus; Attendance: 14,689; Referee: Davide Massa

25 April 2022 34	Sassuolo	1–2	Juventus	Reggio Emilia
20:45 CEST (UTC+2)	Raspadori 39'; Lopez (yellow card) 45+2'; Scamacca (yellow card) 50'	Report	Dybala 45'; De Sciglio (yellow card) 62'; Kean 89', (yellow card) 90'	Stadium: Mapei Stadium – Città del Tricolore; Attendance: 17,838; Referee: Fabio Maresca

30 April 2022 35	Napoli	6–1	Sassuolo	Naples
15:00 CEST (UTC+2)	Koulibaly 7'; Osimhen 15'; Lozano 19'; Mertens 21', 54'; Rrahmani 80'	Report	Lopez (yellow card) 18', (goal) 87'; Frattesi (yellow card) 53'; Berardi (yellow card) 84'	Stadium: Stadio Diego Armando Maradona; Attendance: 20,000; Referee: Antonio Rapuano

7 May 2022 36	Sassuolo	1–1	Udinese	Reggio Emilia
18:00 CEST (UTC+2)	Scamacca 6'; Ayhan (yellow card) 39'; Kyriakopoulos (yellow card) 76'	Report	Pérez (yellow card) 15'; Becão (yellow card) 39'; Nuytinck 77'	Stadium: Mapei Stadium – Città del Tricolore; Attendance: 7,460; Referee: Matteo Marcenaro

15 May 2022 37	Bologna	1–3	Sassuolo	Bologna
12:30 CEST (UTC+2)	Orsolini 90+1' (pen.)	Report	Scamacca 35', 80'; Raspadori (yellow card) 57'; Berardi 75'	Stadium: Stadio Renato Dall'Ara; Attendance: 19,794; Referee: Davide Ghersini

22 May 2022 38	Sassuolo	0–3	Milan	Reggio Emilia
18:00 CEST (UTC+2)	Lopez (yellow card) 37'; Kyriakopoulos (yellow card) 53'	Report	Giroud 17', 32'; Tonali (yellow card) 34'; Kessié 36'	Stadium: Mapei Stadium – Città del Tricolore; Attendance: 21,525; Referee: Daniele Doveri

=== Coppa Italia ===
19 January 2022 Round of 16	Sassuolo	1–0	Cagliari	Reggio Emilia
17:30 CET (UTC+1)	Harroui 18'; Ferrari (yellow card) 86'	Report	Obert (yellow card) 53'	Stadium: Mapei Stadium – Città del Tricolore; Attendance: 850; Referee: Matteo Marchetti

10 February 2022 Quarter-finals	Juventus	2–1	Sassuolo	Turin
21:00 CET (UTC+1)	Dybala 3'; Ruan 88' (o.g.)	Report	Traorè 24', (yellow card) 58'; Matheus Henrique (yellow card) 68'	Stadium: Juventus Stadium; Attendance: 16,111; Referee: Livio Marinelli

== Statistics ==
=== Appearances and goals ===
No.	Pos	Nat	Player	Total		Serie A		Coppa Italia	
No.	Pos	Nat	Player	Apps	Goals	Apps	Goals	Apps	Goals
Goalkeepers
47	GK	(Italy) ITA	Andrea Consigli	8	0	8	0	0	0
Defenders
3	DF	(Italy) ITA	Edoardo Goldaniga	1	0	0+1	0	0	0
5	DF	(Turkey) TUR	Kaan Ayhan	3	0	1+2	0	0	0
6	DF	(Brazil) BRA	Rogério	7	0	7	0	0	0
13	DF	(Italy) ITA	Federico Peluso	0	0	0	0	0	0
17	DF	(Turkey) TUR	Mert Müldür	3	0	3	0	0	0
21	DF	(Romania) ROU	Vlad Chiriches	7	0	7	0	0	0
22	DF	(Germany) GER	Jeremy Toljan	5	0	5	0	0	0
31	DF	(Italy) ITA	Gian Marco Ferrari	8	0	8	0	0	0
77	DF	(Greece) GRE	Georgios Kyriakopoulos	5	0	1+4	0	0	0
Midfielders
4	MF	(Italy) ITA	Francesco Magnanelli	4	0	1+3	0	0	0
8	MF	(France) FRA	Maxime Lopez	8	0	7+1	0	0	0
10	MF	(Serbia) SRB	Filip Djuricic	8	2	7+1	2	0	0
14	MF	(Equatorial Guinea) GEQ	Pedro Obiang	0	0	0	0	0	0
16	MF	(Italy) ITA	Davide Frattesi	8	0	8	0	0	0
20	MF	(Morocco) MAR	Abdou Harroui	4	0	0+4	0	0	0
23	MF	(Ivory Coast) CIV	Hamed Traorè	7	1	1+6	1	0	0
97	MF	(Brazil) BRA	Matheus Henrique	0	0	0	0	0	0
Forwards
7	FW	(Ivory Coast) CIV	Jérémie Boga	7	0	7	0	0	0
18	FW	(Italy) ITA	Giacomo Raspadori	8	1	6+2	1	0	0
25	FW	(Italy) ITA	Domenico Berardi	6	3	6	3	0	0
91	FW	(Italy) ITA	Gianluca Scamacca	8	2	1+7	2	0	0
92	FW	(France) FRA	Grégoire Defrel	8	0	2+6	0	0	0
Players transferred out during the season
9	FW	(Italy) ITA	Francesco Caputo	2	0	2	0	0	0

Last updated: 17 October 2021
Source: Competitions
