= 2020–21 US Sassuolo Calcio season =

Sassuolo
2020–21 season
- Owner: Mapei
- Chairman: Carlo Rossi
- Head coach: Roberto De Zerbi
- Stadium: Mapei Stadium – Città del Tricolore
- Serie A: 8th
- Coppa Italia: Round of 16
- Top goalscorer: League: Domenico Berardi (17); All: Domenico Berardi (17)
| Home colours | Away colours | Third colours |

The 2020–21 season was the 101st season in the existence of U.S. Sassuolo Calcio and the club's 8th consecutive season in the top flight of Italian football. In addition to the domestic league, Sassuolo participated in this season's edition of the Coppa Italia. The season covered the period from 3 August 2020 to 30 June 2021.

== First-team squad ==
As of 20 September 2020

| Squad no. | Name | Nationality | Position(s) | Date of birth | Signed from | Apps | Goals |
Goalkeepers
| 47 | Andrea Consigli | (Italy) | GK | 27 January 1987 (age 39) | (Italy) Atalanta | 226 | 0 |
| 56 | Gianluca Pegolo | (Italy) | GK | 25 March 1981 (age 45) | (Italy) Siena | 53 | 0 |
| 63 | Stefano Turati | (Italy) | GK | 5 September 2001 (age 25) | (Italy) Youth Academy | 2 | 0 |
Defenders
| 2 | Marlon | (Brazil) | CB | 7 September 1995 (age 31) | (Spain) Barcelona | 41 | 1 |
| 5 | Kaan Ayhan | (Turkey) | CB | 10 November 1994 (age 32) | (Germany) Fortuna Düsseldorf | 0 | 0 |
| 6 | Rogério | (Brazil) | LB/LM | 13 January 1998 (age 28) | (Italy) Juventus | 66 | 2 |
| 12 | Claud Adjapong | (Italy) | RB/RM/LM | 6 May 1998 (age 28) | (Italy) Youth Academy | 36 | 2 |
| 13 | Federico Peluso | (Italy) | LB/CB | 20 January 1984 (age 42) | (Italy) Juventus | 181 | 4 |
| 17 | Mert Müldür | (Turkey) | RB | 3 April 1999 (age 27) | (Austria) Rapid Wien | 25 | 2 |
| 19 | Filippo Romagna | (Italy) | CB | 26 May 1997 (age 29) | (Italy) Cagliari | 18 | 0 |
| 21 | Vlad Chiricheș | (Romania) | CB | 14 November 1989 (age 36) | (Italy) Napoli | 9 | 0 |
| 22 | Jeremy Toljan | (Germany) | RB | 8 August 1994 (age 32) | (Germany) Borussia Dortmund | 30 | 1 |
| 31 | Gian Marco Ferrari | (Italy) | CB | 15 May 1992 (age 34) | (Italy) Sampdoria | 56 | 4 |
| 77 | Giorgos Kyriakopoulos | (Greece) | LB | 5 February 1996 (age 30) | (Greece) Asteras Tripolis | 26 | 0 |
Midfielders
| 4 | Francesco Magnanelli | (Italy) | DM | 12 November 1984 (age 42) | (Italy) Sangiovannese | 458 | 9 |
| 8 | Maxime Lopez | (France) | AM | 4 December 1997 (age 28) | (France) Marseille | 0 | 0 |
| 10 | Filip Đuričić | (Serbia) | AM/LW | 30 January 1992 (age 34) | (Italy) Sampdoria | 55 | 7 |
| 14 | Pedro Obiang | (Equatorial Guinea) | DM/CM | 27 March 1992 (age 34) | (England) West Ham | 27 | 1 |
| 23 | Hamed Junior Traorè | (Ivory Coast) | AM/CM | 16 February 2000 (age 26) | (Italy) Empoli | 33 | 5 |
| 36 | Luca Mazzitelli | (Italy) | CM/DM | 15 November 1995 (age 30) | (Italy) Roma | 48 | 1 |
| 44 | Andrea Ghion | (Italy) | CM/DM | 23 February 2000 (age 26) | (Italy) Youth Academy | 3 | 0 |
| 68 | Mehdi Bourabia | (Morocco) | CM/DM | 7 August 1991 (age 35) | (Turkey) Konyaspor | 53 | 3 |
| 73 | Manuel Locatelli | (Italy) | DM/CM | 8 January 1998 (age 28) | (Italy) Milan | 65 | 3 |
Forwards
| 7 | Jérémie Boga | (Ivory Coast) | LW/SS | 3 January 1997 (age 29) | (England) Chelsea | 62 | 14 |
| 9 | Francesco Caputo | (Italy) | CF | 6 August 1987 (age 39) | (Italy) Empoli | 37 | 21 |
| 11 | Jens Odgaard | (Denmark) | CF | 31 March 1999 (age 27) | (Italy) Inter Milan | 1 | 0 |
| 16 | Federico Ricci | (Italy) | RW/LW | 27 May 1994 (age 32) | (Italy) Roma | 31 | 2 |
| 18 | Giacomo Raspadori | (Italy) | CF | 18 February 2000 (age 26) | (Italy) Youth Academy | 14 | 2 |
| 20 | Giacomo Manzari | (Italy) | LW/CF/RW | 21 September 2000 (age 26) | (Italy) Bari | 3 | 0 |
| 25 | Domenico Berardi | (Italy) | RW | 1 August 1994 (age 32) | (Italy) Juventus | 261 | 88 |
| 27 | Lukáš Haraslín | (Slovakia) | LW/RW | 26 May 1996 (age 30) | (Poland) Lechia Gdańsk | 11 | 1 |
| 92 | Grégoire Defrel | (France) | CF | 17 June 1991 (age 35) | (Italy) Roma | 90 | 26 |
| 98 | Nicholas Pierini | (Italy) | LW | 6 August 1998 (age 28) | (Italy) Youth Academy | 4 | 0 |
| 99 | Gianluca Scamacca | (Italy) | CF | 1 January 1999 (age 27) | (Netherlands) PSV | 3 | 0 |

== Transfers and loans ==
=== Transfers in ===
| Entry date | Position | No. | Player | From club | Fee | Ref. |
|---|---|---|---|---|---|---|
| 16 August 2020 | DF | 5 | (Turkey) Kaan Ayhan | (Germany) Fortuna Düsseldorf | €2,500,000 | |
| 17 September 2020 | DF | 19 | (Italy) Filippo Romagna | (Italy) Cagliari | Undisclosed | |

=== Transfers out ===
| Exit date | Position | No. | Player | To club | Fee | Ref. |
|---|---|---|---|---|---|---|
| 17 September 2020 | DF | 33 | (Italy) Alessandro Tripaldelli | (Italy) Cagliari | Undisclosed | |

=== Loans out ===
| Start date | End date | Position | No. | Player | To club | Fee | Ref. |
|---|---|---|---|---|---|---|---|
| 1 September 2020 | 30 June 2021 | DF | — | (Italy) Giuseppe Aurelio | (Italy) Cesena | None | |
| 1 September 2020 | 30 June 2021 | GK | — | (Italy) Matteo Campani | (Italy) Paganese | None | |
| 1 September 2020 | 30 June 2021 | FW | — | (Albania) Aristidi Kolaj | (Italy) Pro Patria | None | |
| 1 September 2020 | 30 June 2021 | DF | — | (Italy) Luca Ravanelli | (Italy) Cremonese | None | |
| 1 September 2020 | 30 June 2021 | GK | — | (Italy) Alessandro Russo | (Italy) Virtus Entella | None | |
| 1 September 2020 | 30 June 2021 | GK | — | (Italy) Giacomo Satalino | (Italy) Cesena | None | |
| 2 September 2020 | 30 June 2021 | DF | 32 | (Italy) Giangiacomo Magnani | (Italy) Verona | None | |
| 3 September 2020 | 31 December 2021 | FW | — | (Senegal) Khouma Babacar | (Turkey) Alanyaspor | None | |
| 3 September 2020 | 30 June 2021 | MF | — | (Italy) Marco Pinato | (Italy) Cremonese | None | |
| 3 September 2020 | 30 June 2021 | DF | — | (Italy) Alessandro Pilati | (Italy) Imolese | None | |
| 16 September 2020 | 30 June 2021 | DF | — | (Italy) Edoardo Goldaniga | (Italy) Genoa | None | |
| 16 September 2020 | 30 June 2021 | MF | — | (Italy) Davide Frattesi | (Italy) Monza | None | |

== Pre-season and friendlies ==
| 13 September 2020 Friendly | Sassuolo Neroverde (Italy) ^{[A]} | 1–0 | (Italy) Pisa | Reggio Emilia, Italy |
| 18:00 CEST (UTC+2) | Đuričić 36' | Report | | Stadium: Mapei Stadium; Attendance: 0 |
Note: 45 minute match.

| 13 September 2020 Friendly | Sassuolo Neroverde (Italy) ^{[A]} | 0–1 | (Italy) Sassuolo Bianco^{[A]} | Reggio Emilia, Italy |
| 19:00 CEST (UTC+2) | | Report | Manzari 22' | Stadium: Mapei Stadium; Attendance: 0 |
Note: 45 minute match.

| 13 September 2020 Friendly | Pisa (Italy) | 1–0 | (Italy) Sassuolo Bianco^{[A]} | Reggio Emilia, Italy |
| 20:00 CEST (UTC+2) | Marconi 27' | Report | | Stadium: Mapei Stadium; Attendance: 0 |
Note: 45 minute match.

== Competitions ==
=== Overview ===
| Competition | First match | Last match | Starting round | Final position | Record | | | | | | | |
| Competition | First match | Last match | Starting round | Final position | Pld | W | D | L | GF | GA | GD | Win % |
|---|---|---|---|---|---|---|---|---|---|---|---|---|
| Serie A | 20 September 2020 | 23 May 2021 | Matchday 1 | 8th | 38 | 17 | 11 | 10 | 64 | 56 | +8 | 44.74 |
| Coppa Italia | 14 January 2021 | | Round of 16 | Round of 16 | 1 | 0 | 0 | 1 | 0 | 2 | −2 | 0.00 |
| Total | | | | | 39 | 17 | 11 | 11 | 64 | 58 | +6 | 43.59 |

Last updated: 23 May 2021
Source: Soccerway

=== Serie A ===
==== League table ====
| Pos | Team | Pld | W | D | L | GF | GA | GD | Pts | Qualification or relegation |
|---|---|---|---|---|---|---|---|---|---|---|
| 6 | Lazio | 38 | 21 | 5 | 12 | 61 | 55 | +6 | 68 | Qualification for Europa League group stage (Note: Since the winners of the 2020–21 Coppa Italia, Juventus, qualified for the Champions League, the Europa League berth awarded to the Coppa Italia winners was passed to the sixth-placed team, and the Europa Conference League berth awarded to the sixth-placed team was passed to the seventh-placed team.) |
| 7 | Roma | 38 | 18 | 8 | 12 | 68 | 58 | +10 | 62 | Qualification for Conference League play-off round |
| 8 | Sassuolo | 38 | 17 | 11 | 10 | 64 | 56 | +8 | 62 | |
| 9 | Sampdoria | 38 | 15 | 7 | 16 | 52 | 54 | −2 | 52 | |
| 10 | Hellas Verona | 38 | 11 | 12 | 15 | 46 | 48 | −2 | 45 | |

Source: Serie A, Soccerway
Rules for classification: 1) Points; 2) Head-to-head points; 3) Head-to-head goal difference; 4) Goal difference; 5) Goals scored; 6) Draw. (Note: Head-to-head record is used only after all the matches between the teams in question have been played)

==== Results summary ====
| Overall | | | | | | | | Home | | | | | | Away | | | | | |
| Pld | W | D | L | GF | GA | GD | Pts | W | D | L | GF | GA | GD | W | D | L | GF | GA | GD |
|---|---|---|---|---|---|---|---|---|---|---|---|---|---|---|---|---|---|---|---|
| 38 | 17 | 11 | 10 | 64 | 56 | +8 | 62 | 7 | 8 | 4 | 31 | 27 | +4 | 10 | 3 | 6 | 33 | 29 | +4 |

Last updated: 23 May 2021.
Source: Serie A

==== Results by round ====
| Round | 1 | 2 | 3 | 4 | 5 | 6 | 7 | 8 | 9 | 10 | 11 | 12 | 13 | 14 | 15 | 16 | 17 | 18 | 19 | 20 | 21 | 22 | 23 | 24 | 25 | 26 | 27 | 28 | 29 | 30 | 31 | 32 | 33 | 34 | 35 | 36 | 37 | 38 |
|---|---|---|---|---|---|---|---|---|---|---|---|---|---|---|---|---|---|---|---|---|---|---|---|---|---|---|---|---|---|---|---|---|---|---|---|---|---|---|
| Ground | H | A | H | A | H | A | H | A | H | A | H | A | H | A | A | H | A | H | A | A | H | A | H | A | H | A | H | A | H | A | H | A | H | H | A | H | A | H |
| Result | D | W | W | W | D | W | D | W | L | D | W | D | L | W | L | W | L | D | L | D | L | W | D | L | D | L | W | L | D | W | W | W | W | D | W | L | W | W |
| Position | 8 | 7 | 5 | 2 | 3 | 2 | 2 | 2 | 3 | 5 | 5 | 6 | 6 | 4 | 6 | 5 | 7 | 8 | 9 | 8 | 8 | 8 | 8 | 9 | 9 | 9 | 8 | 8 | 9 | 8 | 8 | 8 | 8 | 8 | 8 | 8 | 8 | 8 |

Updated to match(es) played on 23 May 2021. Source: Serie A
A = Away; H = Home; W = Win; D = Draw; L = Loss

==== Matches ====
The league fixtures were announced on 2 September 2020.

| 20 September 2020 1 | Sassuolo | 1–1 | Cagliari | Reggio Emilia |
| 18:00 CEST (UTC+2) | Chiricheș (yellow card) 59'; Bourabia 87' | Report | Faragò (yellow card) 7'; Nández (yellow card) 16'; Rog (yellow card) 51'; Simeone 77' | Stadium: Mapei Stadium; Referee: Livio Marinelli |

| 27 September 2020 2 | Spezia | 1–4 | Sassuolo | Cesena |
| 12:30 CEST (UTC+2) | Galabinov 30'; Sala (yellow card) 44'; Zoet (yellow card) 63' | Report | Đuričić 12', (yellow card) 45+4'; Berardi 64' (pen.); Defrel 66'; Caputo 76' | Stadium: Stadio Dino Manuzzi; Referee: Davide Ghersini |

| 3 October 2020 3 | Sassuolo | 4–1 | Crotone | Reggio Emilia |
| 15:00 CEST (UTC+2) | Berardi 19'; Chiricheș (yellow card) 24'; Caputo 58' (pen.), 85'; Kyriakopoulos (yellow card) 74'; Locatelli 90+3' | Report | Simy 49' (pen.), (yellow card) 61'; Magallán (yellow card) 63'; Cigarini (yellow card) 65' | Stadium: Mapei Stadium; Referee: Ivano Pezzuto |

| 18 October 2020 4 | Bologna | 3–4 | Sassuolo | Bologna |
| 12:30 CEST (UTC+2) | Soriano 9'; Svanberg (yellow card) 35', (goal) 39'; Orsolini 60'; Skorupski (yellow card) 73'; Mbaye (yellow card) 75' | Report | Berardi 18'; Đuričić 64'; Caputo 70'; Locatelli (yellow card) 73'; Tomiyasu 77' (o.g.); Ayhan (yellow card) 82' | Stadium: Stadio Renato Dall'Ara; Referee: Daniele Doveri |

| 23 October 2020 5 | Sassuolo | 3–3 | Torino | Reggio Emilia |
| 20:45 CEST (UTC+2) | Ferrari (yellow card) 59'; Đuričić 71'; Berardi (yellow card) 78'; Chiricheș 84'; Caputo 85' | Report | Vojvoda (yellow card) 27'; Linetty 33'; Rincón (yellow card) 73'; Belotti 77'; Lukić 79' | Stadium: Mapei Stadium; Referee: Marco Guida |

| 1 November 2020 6 | Napoli | 0–2 | Sassuolo | Naples |
| 18:00 CET (UTC+1) | Manolas (yellow card) 61'; Ospina (yellow card) 90+6' | Report | Locatelli (yellow card) 49', (goal) 59' (pen.); Bourabia (yellow card) 90'; Lopez 90+5' | Stadium: Stadio San Paolo; Attendance: 0 Referee: Maurizio Mariani |

| 6 November 2020 7 | Sassuolo | 0–0 | Udinese | Reggio Emilia |
| 20:45 CET (UTC+1) | Traorè (yellow card) 31'; Ferrari (yellow card) 43' | Report | Pussetto (yellow card) 9'; Nuytinck (yellow card) 16' | Stadium: Mapei Stadium; Attendance: 0 Referee: Eugenio Abbattista |

| 22 November 2020 8 | Hellas Verona | 0–2 | Sassuolo | Verona |
| 15:00 CET (UTC+1) | Dimarco (yellow card) 45+1' | Report | Boga 42'; Lopez (yellow card) 55'; Locatelli (yellow card) 60'; Berardi 76'; Marlon (yellow card) 90' | Stadium: Stadio Marcantonio Bentegodi; Attendance: 0 Referee: Daniele Chiffi |

| 28 November 2020 9 | Sassuolo | 0–3 | Internazionale | Reggio Emilia |
| 15:00 CET (UTC+1) | Locatelli (yellow card) 49'; Rogério (yellow card) 57'; Lopez (yellow card) 66' | Report | Sánchez 4'; Chiricheș 14' (o.g.); Gagliardini 60'; Perišić (yellow card) 80' | Stadium: Mapei Stadium; Attendance: 0 Referee: Massimiliano Irrati |

| 6 December 2020 10 | Roma | 0–0 | Sassuolo | Rome |
| 15:00 CET (UTC+1) | Pedro (yellow card) 11' (yellow-red card) 41'; Villar (yellow card) 25'; Mirante (yellow card) 45+2'; Karsdorp (yellow card) 87' | Report | Lopez (yellow card) 18'; Raspadori (yellow card) 71'; Obiang (yellow card) 79' | Stadium: Stadio Olimpico; Attendance: 0 Referee: Fabio Maresca |

| 11 December 2020 11 | Sassuolo | 1–0 | Benevento | Reggio Emilia |
| 20:45 CET (UTC+1) | Berardi 7' (pen.), (yellow card) 40'; Haraslín (red card) 49'; Ayhan (yellow card) 86' | Report | Hetemaj (yellow card) 9'; Ioniță (yellow card) 23'; Barba (yellow card) 69'; Dabo (yellow card) 87' | Stadium: Mapei Stadium; Attendance: 0 Referee: Simone Sozza |

| 16 December 2020 12 | Fiorentina | 1–1 | Sassuolo | Florence |
| 20:45 CET (UTC+1) | Amrabat (yellow card) 7'; Vlahović 35' (pen.); Castrovilli (yellow card) 42'; Biraghi (yellow card) 45+1'; Milenković (yellow card) 90+2' | Report | Traorè 13', (yellow card) 29'; Locatelli (yellow card) 18'; Berardi (yellow card) 19'; Toljan (yellow card) 62' | Stadium: Stadio Artemio Franchi; Attendance: 0 Referee: Paolo Valeri |

| 20 December 2020 13 | Sassuolo | 1–2 | Milan | Reggio Emilia |
| 15:00 CET (UTC+1) | Berardi (yellow card) 65', (goal) 89' | Report | Leão 1'; Saelemaekers 26'; Kessié (yellow card) 61'; Calabria (yellow card) 71'; Romagnoli (yellow card) 88' | Stadium: Mapei Stadium; Attendance: 0 Referee: Maurizio Mariani |

| 23 December 2020 14 | Sampdoria | 2–3 | Sassuolo | Genoa |
| 20:45 CET (UTC+1) | Colley (yellow card) 49'; Quagliarella 55'; Tonelli (yellow card) 72'; Keita 84', (red card) 90+2' | Report | Traorè 2'; Caputo (yellow card) 34', (goal) 56'; Magnanelli (yellow card) 44'; Berardi 58'; Chiricheș (yellow card) 68'; Locatelli (yellow card) 90+5' | Stadium: Stadio Luigi Ferraris; Attendance: 0 Referee: Giovanni Ayroldi |

| 3 January 2021 15 | Atalanta | 5–1 | Sassuolo | Bergamo |
| 15:00 CET (UTC+1) | Zapata 11', 49'; Hateboer (yellow card) 25'; Romero (yellow card) 44'; Pessina 45'; Gosens 57'; Muriel 68'; De Roon (yellow card) 80' | Report | Chiricheș (yellow card) 51', (goal) 75' | Stadium: Gewiss Stadium; Attendance: 0 Referee: Fabio Maresca |

| 6 January 2021 16 | Sassuolo | 2–1 | Genoa | Reggio Emilia |
| 15:00 CET (UTC+1) | Ayhan (yellow card) 39'; Boga 52'; Bourabia (yellow card) 59'; Raspadori 83'; Müldür (yellow card) 87' | Report | Criscito (yellow card) 12'; Masiello (yellow card) 23'; Shomurodov 64'; Goldaniga (yellow card) 85' | Stadium: Mapei Stadium; Attendance: 0 Referee: Michael Fabbri |

| 10 January 2021 17 | Juventus | 3–1 | Sassuolo | Turin |
| 20:45 CET (UTC+1) | Bonucci (yellow card) 13'; Bentancur (yellow card) 35'; Danilo 50'; Frabotta (yellow card) 71'; Kulusevski (yellow card) 79'; Ramsey 82'; Ronaldo 90+2' | Report | Ferrari (yellow card) 17'; Obiang (red card) 45+2'; Defrel 58' | Stadium: Allianz Stadium; Attendance: 0 Referee: Davide Massa |

| 17 January 2021 18 | Sassuolo | 1–1 | Parma | Reggio Emilia |
| 15:00 CET (UTC+1) | Chiricheș (yellow card) 1'; Lopez (yellow card) 71'; Rogério (yellow card) 77'; Đuričić 90+5' (pen.) | Report | Kucka 37'; Brugman (yellow card) 80'; Busi (yellow card) 84' | Stadium: Mapei Stadium; Attendance: 0 Referee: Ivano Pezzuto |

| 24 January 2021 19 | Lazio | 2–1 | Sassuolo | Rome |
| 18:00 CET (UTC+1) | Milinković-Savić 25'; Patric (yellow card) 59'; Immobile 71'; Lucas (yellow card) 75' | Report | Caputo 6'; Marlon (yellow card) 65'; Obiang (yellow card) 68'; Ferrari (yellow card) 90+2' | Stadium: Stadio Olimpico; Attendance: 0 Referee: Antonio Giua |

| 31 January 2021 20 | Cagliari | 1–1 | Sassuolo | Cagliari |
| 15:00 CET (UTC+1) | Marin (yellow card) 20'; Nainggolan (yellow card) 52'; João Pedro 75' | Report | Obiang (yellow card) 60'; Lopez (yellow card) 85'; Rogério (yellow card) 90'; Boga 90+4' | Stadium: Sardegna Arena; Attendance: 0 Referee: Maurizio Mariani |

| 6 February 2021 21 | Sassuolo | 1–2 | Spezia | Reggio Emilia |
| 15:00 CET (UTC+1) | Caputo 25'; Locatelli (yellow card) 79'; Ferrari (yellow card) 86' | Report | Bastoni (yellow card) 31'; Erlić 39', (yellow card) 69'; Gyasi 78'; Vignali (yellow card) 90+1' | Stadium: Mapei Stadium; Attendance: 0 Referee: Juan Luca Sacchi |

| 14 February 2021 22 | Crotone | 1–2 | Sassuolo | Crotone |
| 18:00 CET (UTC+1) | Ounas 26'; Vulić (yellow card) 80' | Report | Berardi 14'; Peluso (yellow card) 34'; Caputo 49' (pen.) | Stadium: Stadio Ezio Scida; Attendance: 0 Referee: Ivano Pezzuto |

| 20 February 2021 23 | Sassuolo | 1–1 | Bologna | Reggio Emilia |
| 20:45 CET (UTC+1) | Caputo 52'; Traorè (yellow card) 90+2' | Report | Soriano 17'; Hickey (red card) 30' | Stadium: Mapei Stadium; Attendance: 0 Referee: Federico La Penna |

| 3 March 2021 25 | Sassuolo | 3–3 | Napoli | Reggio Emilia |
| 18:30 CET (UTC+1) | Đuričić (yellow card) 30'; Maksimović 36' (o.g.); Berardi 45+1' (pen.); Marlon (yellow card) 79'; Caputo 90+5' (pen.) | Report | Zieliński 38'; Demme (yellow card) 69'; Di Lorenzo 72'; Ghoulam (yellow card) 77'; Insigne 90' (pen.) | Stadium: Mapei Stadium; Attendance: 0 Referee: Valerio Marini |

| 6 March 2021 26 | Udinese | 2–0 | Sassuolo | Udine |
| 18:00 CET (UTC+1) | Llorente 42'; De Paul (yellow card) 53'; Pereyra 90+3' | Report | | Stadium: Stadio Friuli; Attendance: 0 Referee: Lorenzo Maggioni |

| 13 March 2021 27 | Sassuolo | 3–2 | Hellas Verona | Reggio Emilia |
| 15:00 CET (UTC+1) | Locatelli 4', (yellow card) 76'; Đuričić 51', (yellow card) 52'; Traorè 81', (yellow card) 90+3' | Report | Faraoni (yellow card) 29'; Lazović 43'; Magnani (yellow card) 55'; Dimarco 79' | Stadium: Mapei Stadium; Attendance: 0 Referee: Alessandro Prontera |

| 17 March 2021 24 | Torino | 3–2 | Sassuolo | Turin |
| 15:00 CET (UTC+1) | Sanabria (yellow card) 72'; Zaza 77', 90+2'; Mandragora 87' | Report | Berardi 6', 38'; Defrel (yellow card) 60'; Toljan (yellow card) 78' | Stadium: Stadio Olimpico Grande Torino; Attendance: 0 Referee: Maurizio Mariani |
Note: The match was originally scheduled for 26 February 2021, but was postponed after eight Torino players tested positive for COVID-19 amid its pandemic in Italy.

| 3 April 2021 29 | Sassuolo | 2–2 | Roma | Reggio Emilia |
| 15:00 CEST (UTC+2) | Đuričić (yellow card) 2'; Traorè 57'; Raspadori 85'; Rogério (yellow card) 87'; Turati (yellow card) 90'; Haraslín (yellow card) 90+3' | Report | Diawara (yellow card) 15'; Pellegrini 26' (pen.), (yellow card) 44'; Peres 69'; Cristante (yellow card) 90+2' | Stadium: Mapei Stadium; Attendance: 0 Referee: Luca Pairetto |

| 7 April 2021 28 | Internazionale | 2–1 | Sassuolo | Milan |
| 18:45 CEST (UTC+2) | Lukaku 10'; Barella (yellow card) 17'; Young (yellow card) 60'; Martínez 67' | Report | Consigli (yellow card) 7'; Traorè (yellow card) 23', (goal) 85'; Lopez (yellow card) 84' | Stadium: San Siro; Attendance: 0 Referee: Massimiliano Irrati |
Note: The match was originally scheduled for 20 March 2021, but was postponed after four Internazionale players tested positive for COVID-19. On 24 March, the match was rescheduled to 7 April 2021.

| 12 April 2021 30 | Benevento | 0–1 | Sassuolo | Benevento |
| 20:45 CEST (UTC+2) | Tuia (yellow card) 55'; Schiattarella (yellow card) 58'; Letizia (yellow card) 84' | Report | Ferrari (yellow card) 11'; Barba 45' (o.g.); Magnanelli (yellow card) 64' | Stadium: Stadio Ciro Vigorito; Attendance: 0 Referee: Valerio Marini |

| 17 April 2021 31 | Sassuolo | 3–1 | Fiorentina | Reggio Emilia |
| 18:00 CEST (UTC+2) | Traorè (yellow card) 13'; Lopez (yellow card) 45+1', (goal) 75'; Berardi 59' (pen.), 62' (pen.); Müldür (yellow card) 70' | Report | Castrovilli (yellow card) 15'; Milenković (yellow card) 28'; Bonaventura 31'; Biraghi (yellow card) 68'; Eysseric (yellow card) 81'; Pulgar (yellow card) 90+1' | Stadium: Mapei Stadium; Attendance: 0 Referee: Gianluca Aureliano |

| 21 April 2021 32 | Milan | 1–2 | Sassuolo | Milan |
| 18:30 CEST (UTC+2) | Çalhanoğlu 30' | Report | Đuričić (yellow card) 60'; Raspadori 76', 83' | Stadium: San Siro; Attendance: 0 Referee: Juan Luca Sacchi |

| 24 April 2021 33 | Sassuolo | 1–0 | Sampdoria | Reggio Emilia |
| 20:45 CEST (UTC+2) | Berardi 69' | Report | | Stadium: Mapei Stadium; Attendance: 0 Referee: Matteo Gariglio |

| 2 May 2021 34 | Sassuolo | 1–1 | Atalanta | Reggio Emilia |
| 15:00 CEST (UTC+2) | Marlon (yellow card) 28' (yellow-red card) 75'; Chiricheș (yellow card) 35'; Locatelli (yellow card) 40'; Obiang (yellow card) 45+1'; Berardi 52' (pen.); Ferrari (yellow card) 53' | Report | Gollini (red card) 23'; Gosens 32'; Muriel (penalty missed) 76'; Djimsiti (yellow card) 78' | Stadium: Mapei Stadium; Attendance: 0 Referee: Luca Pairetto |

| 9 May 2021 35 | Genoa | 1–2 | Sassuolo | Genoa |
| 12:30 CEST (UTC+2) | Zappacosta (yellow card) 30', (goal) 85'; Cassata (yellow card) 90+4' | Report | Raspadori 14'; Berardi 61' | Stadium: Stadio Luigi Ferraris; Attendance: 0 Referee: Maurizio Mariani |

| 12 May 2021 36 | Sassuolo | 1–3 | Juventus | Reggio Emilia |
| 20:45 CEST (UTC+2) | Berardi (penalty missed) 16'; Marlon (yellow card) 18'; Raspadori 59' | Report | Danilo (yellow card) 24'; Rabiot 28'; Chiesa (yellow card) 33'; Ronaldo 45'; Dybala 66' | Stadium: Mapei Stadium; Attendance: 0 Referee: Piero Giacomelli |

| 16 May 2021 37 | Parma | 1–3 | Sassuolo | Parma |
| 18:00 CEST (UTC+2) | Kurtić (yellow card) 28'; Alves 32' | Report | Locatelli 25' (pen.); Defrel 62'; Boga 69' | Stadium: Stadio Ennio Tardini; Attendance: 0 Referee: Marco Piccinini |

| 23 May 2021 38 | Sassuolo | 2–0 | Lazio | Reggio Emilia |
| 20:45 CEST (UTC+2) | Kyriakopoulos 10', (yellow card) 50' (yellow-red card) 61'; Berardi 78' (pen.) | Report | Parolo (yellow card) 90+3' | Stadium: Mapei Stadium; Attendance: 0 Referee: Alessandro Prontera |

=== Coppa Italia ===
The draw for the tournament was held on 8 September 2020. Sassuolo entered in the round of 16.

| 14 January 2021 Round of 16 | Sassuolo | 0–2 | SPAL | Reggio Emilia |
| 17:30 CET (UTC+1) | Đuričić (red card) 47'; Müldür (yellow card) 66' | Report | Missiroli 49'; Dickmann 58' | Stadium: Mapei Stadium; Referee: Giacomo Camplone |

== Squad statistics ==
=== Appearances and goals ===
| No. | Pos | Nat | Player | Total | | Serie A | | Coppa Italia | |
| No. | Pos | Nat | Player | Apps | Goals | Apps | Goals | Apps | Goals |
Goalkeepers
| 47 | GK | (Italy) ITA | Andrea Consigli | 37 | 0 | 37 | 0 | 0 | 0 |
| 56 | GK | (Italy) ITA | Gianluca Pegolo | 2 | 0 | 1 | 0 | 1 | 0 |
| 63 | GK | (Italy) ITA | Stefano Turati | 0 | 0 | 0 | 0 | 0 | 0 |
Defenders
| 2 | DF | (Brazil) BRA | Marlon | 25 | 0 | 19+5 | 0 | 1 | 0 |
| 5 | DF | (Turkey) TUR | Kaan Ayhan | 20 | 0 | 7+12 | 0 | 0+1 | 0 |
| 6 | DF | (Brazil) BRA | Rogério | 29 | 0 | 21+7 | 0 | 1 | 0 |
| 13 | DF | (Italy) ITA | Federico Peluso | 8 | 0 | 2+5 | 0 | 1 | 0 |
| 17 | DF | (Turkey) TUR | Mert Müldür | 29 | 0 | 18+10 | 0 | 1 | 0 |
| 19 | DF | (Italy) ITA | Filippo Romagna | 0 | 0 | 0 | 0 | 0 | 0 |
| 21 | DF | (Romania) ROU | Vlad Chiricheș | 24 | 2 | 22+2 | 2 | 0 | 0 |
| 22 | DF | (Germany) GER | Jeremy Toljan | 26 | 0 | 18+8 | 0 | 0 | 0 |
| 31 | DF | (Italy) ITA | Gian Marco Ferrari | 34 | 0 | 33+1 | 0 | 0 | 0 |
| 77 | DF | (Greece) GRE | Giorgos Kyriakopoulos | 24 | 1 | 16+7 | 1 | 0+1 | 0 |
Midfielders
| 4 | MF | (Italy) ITA | Francesco Magnanelli | 10 | 0 | 7+3 | 0 | 0 | 0 |
| 7 | MF | (Ivory Coast) CIV | Jérémie Boga | 28 | 4 | 20+7 | 4 | 1 | 0 |
| 8 | MF | (France) FRA | Maxime Lopez | 30 | 2 | 22+7 | 2 | 1 | 0 |
| 10 | MF | (Serbia) SRB | Filip Đuričić | 33 | 5 | 27+5 | 5 | 1 | 0 |
| 14 | MF | (Equatorial Guinea) GEQ | Pedro Obiang | 34 | 0 | 16+17 | 0 | 1 | 0 |
| 23 | MF | (Ivory Coast) CIV | Hamed Junior Traorè | 35 | 5 | 20+15 | 5 | 0 | 0 |
| 27 | MF | (Slovakia) SVK | Lukáš Haraslín | 15 | 0 | 2+12 | 0 | 0+1 | 0 |
| 68 | MF | (Morocco) MAR | Mehdi Bourabia | 15 | 1 | 4+11 | 1 | 0 | 0 |
| 73 | MF | (Italy) ITA | Manuel Locatelli | 34 | 4 | 32+2 | 4 | 0 | 0 |
Forwards
| 9 | FW | (Italy) ITA | Francesco Caputo | 25 | 11 | 19+6 | 11 | 0 | 0 |
| 18 | FW | (Italy) ITA | Giacomo Raspadori | 28 | 6 | 13+14 | 6 | 1 | 0 |
| 25 | FW | (Italy) ITA | Domenico Berardi | 30 | 17 | 28+2 | 17 | 0 | 0 |
| 26 | FW | (France) FRA | Isaac Karamoko | 1 | 0 | 0+1 | 0 | 0 | 0 |
| 30 | FW | (Italy) ITA | Brian Oddei | 6 | 0 | 0+5 | 0 | 1 | 0 |
| 92 | FW | (France) FRA | Grégoire Defrel | 28 | 3 | 14+14 | 3 | 0 | 0 |
Players transferred out during the season
| 16 | FW | (Italy) ITA | Federico Ricci | 1 | 0 | 0+1 | 0 | 0 | 0 |
| 91 | FW | (Uruguay) URU | Nicolás Schiappacasse | 2 | 0 | 0+1 | 0 | 0+1 | 0 |

Last updated: 23 May 2021
Source: Competitions

=== Goalscorers ===
As of 23 May 2021

| Rank | No. | Pos | Nat | Name | Serie A | Coppa Italia | Total |
|---|---|---|---|---|---|---|---|
| 1 | 25 | FW | (Italy) | Domenico Berardi | 17 | 0 | 17 |
| 2 | 9 | FW | (Italy) | Francesco Caputo | 11 | 0 | 11 |
| 3 | 18 | FW | (Italy) | Giacomo Raspadori | 6 | 0 | 6 |
| 4 | 10 | MF | (Serbia) | Filip Đuričić | 5 | 0 | 5 |
| 4 | 23 | MF | (Ivory Coast) | Hamed Traorè | 5 | 0 | 5 |
| 6 | 7 | MF | (Ivory Coast) | Jérémie Boga | 4 | 0 | 4 |
| 6 | 73 | MF | (Italy) | Manuel Locatelli | 4 | 0 | 4 |
| 8 | 92 | FW | (France) | Grégoire Defrel | 3 | 0 | 3 |
| 9 | 8 | MF | (France) | Maxime Lopez | 2 | 0 | 2 |
| 9 | 21 | DF | (Romania) | Vlad Chiricheș | 2 | 0 | 2 |
| 11 | 68 | MF | (Morocco) | Mehdi Bourabia | 1 | 0 | 1 |
| 11 | 77 | DF | (Greece) | Giorgos Kyriakopoulos | 1 | 0 | 1 |
| Own goals | | | | | 3 | 0 | 3 |
| Totals | | | | | 64 | 0 | 64 |

=== Disciplinary record ===
As of match played 20 September 2020

| No. | Pos. | Name | Serie A | | Coppa Italia | | Total | |
| No. | Pos. | Name | Yellow card | Red card | Yellow card | Red card | Yellow card | Red card |
|---|---|---|---|---|---|---|---|---|
| 21 | DF | (Romania) Vlad Chiricheș | 1 | 0 | 0 | 0 | 1 | 0 |

== Notes ==
A. Sassuolo roster divided into two squads.
