= Mert Müldür =

Turkish footballer (born 1999)

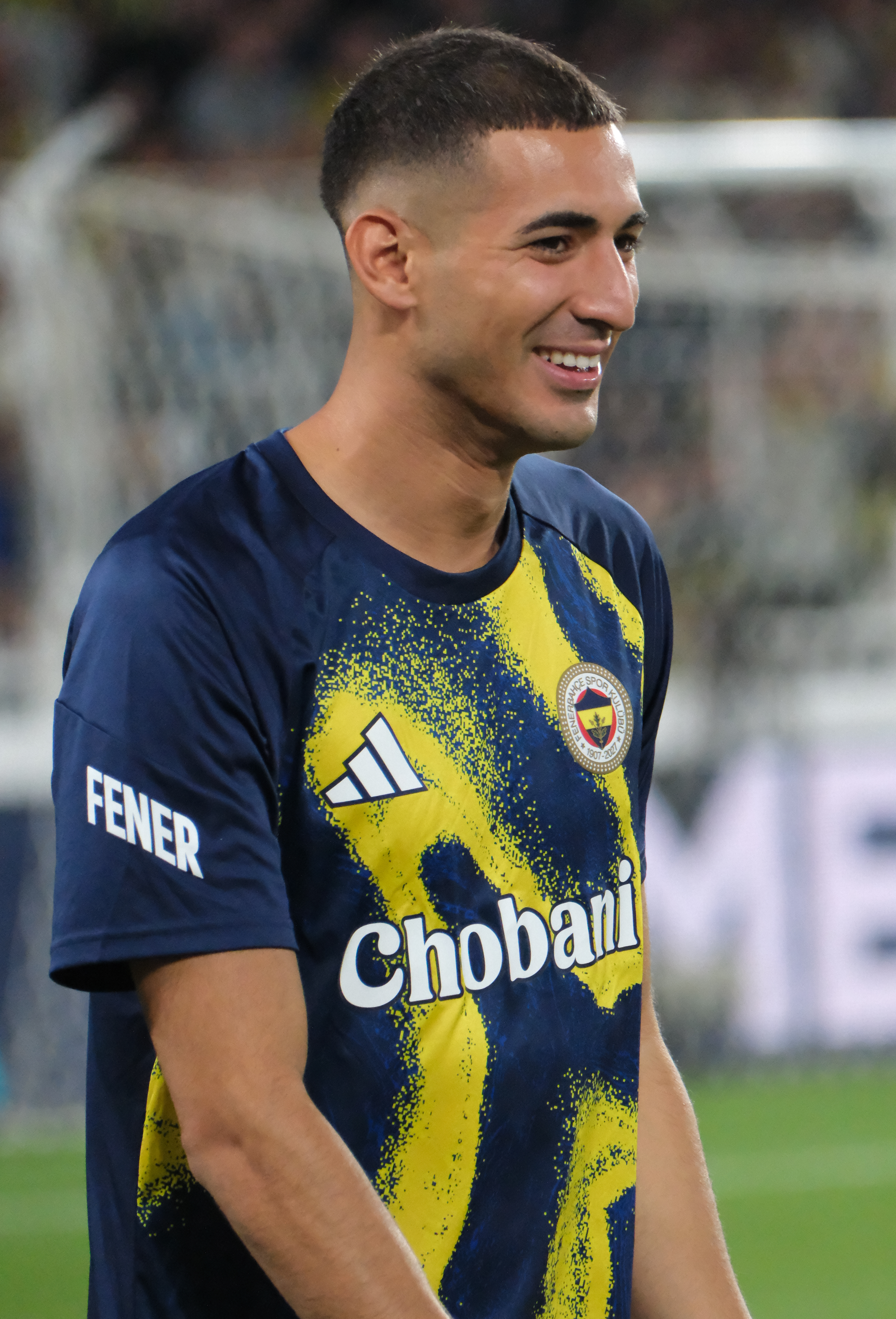
- Müldür with Fenerbahçe in 2026

Personal information
- Full name: Mert Müldür
- Date of birth: 3 April 1999 (age 27)
- Place of birth: Vienna, Austria
- Height: 1.88 m (6 ft 2 in)
- Positions: Full-back; centre-back

Team information
- Current team: Fenerbahçe
- Number: 18

Youth career
- 2006–2018: Rapid Wien

Senior career*
Years	Team	Apps	(Gls)
2017–2018	Rapid Wien II	23	(0)
2018–2019	Rapid Wien	32	(1)
2019–2023	Sassuolo	85	(2)
2023–	Fenerbahçe	83	(5)

International career^{‡}
2016	Turkey U17	6	(0)
2017	Turkey U19	4	(0)
2019	Turkey U21	5	(2)
2018–	Turkey	48	(3)
- * Club domestic league appearances and goals as of 8 November 2026 ‡ National team caps and goals as of 25 June 2026

Mert Müldür (born 3 April 1999) is a professional footballer who plays as a right-back or a centre-back for Süper Lig club Fenerbahçe. Born in Austria, he represents the Turkey national team. A versatile player, he is capable of playing in multiple positions, especially as a defender.

== Club career ==
=== Rapid Wien ===
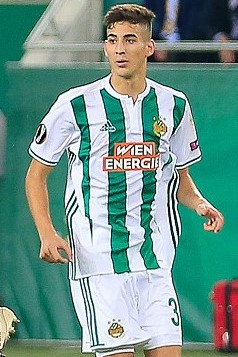
Müldür with Rapid Wien in 2018

Müldür joined the SK Rapid Wien youth academy at the age of six in 2006, and worked his way up into the professional team. He made his professional debut for SK Rapid in a 4–1 Austrian Football Bundesliga loss to FC Red Bull Salzburg on 13 May 2018. On 29 May 2018, Müldür signed his first professional contract for three years with Rapid Wien.

=== Sassuolo ===
On 20 August 2019, Müldür signed for Italian club Sassuolo. He made his debut five days later, coming on as a substitute in a 2–1 away loss against Torino.

On 15 August 2022, he suffered an ankle fracture injury against Juventus and missed 16 matches.

=== Fenerbahçe ===
On 2 August 2023, Müldür signed a four-year contract with Fenerbahçe until 2027.

He made his debut with the team in a 3–0 UEFA Europa Conference League win over NK Maribor on 17 August 2023. On 21 August 2023, he made his Süper Lig debut with the team against Samsunspor in an away game, Fenerbahçe won 2–0.

On 2 February 2026, he made his 100th appearances in all competitions for Fenerbahçe against FCSB in 1–1 UEFA Europa League away draw.

== International career ==
Born in Austria to Turkish parents, Müldür is a youth international for Turkey. He made his debut for the senior Turkish national team on 11 October 2018 in a 0–0 friendly draw against Bosnia and Herzegovina.

At UEFA Euro 2024, Turkey's first and last goals were ignominiously credited to Müldür: he began his country's goal tally with a volley against Georgia in the group stage opener and scored the decisive own goal against the Netherlands in the quarter-finals.

On 2 June 2026, Müldür was selected in the 26-man squad for the 2026 FIFA World Cup.

== Style of play ==
Müldür is right-footed and began playing for Rapid Wien II as a right-back, although he is also known to play in the left-back position and as an attacker. Müldür is known for his sliding tackles, speed, stamina and aerial abilities which can make him play in a centre-back position. Through utilization of both feet, he can also successfully distribute passes from the back, which is considered an important feature of the new generation of defenders.

== Personal life ==
Müldür is a longtime fan of Fenerbahçe since his childhood.

Müldür is multilingual, speaking five languages fluently: Turkish and German as main languages, English in education, also Bosnian and Serbian fluently because of his Serbian girlfriend, whom he has been with for many years.

== Career statistics ==
=== Club ===
As of match played 8 November 2026

Appearances and goals by club, season and competition
Club	Season	League			National cup (Note: Includes Austrian Cup, Coppa Italia and Turkish Cup)		Europe		Other		Total	
Club	Season	Division	Apps	Goals	Apps	Goals	Apps	Goals	Apps	Goals	Apps	Goals
Rapid Wien II	2017–18	Austrian Regionalliga Ost	23	0	—		—		—		23	0
Rapid Wien	2017–18	Austrian Bundesliga	2	0	—		—		—		2	0
Rapid Wien	2018–19	Austrian Bundesliga	26	0	5	0	10 (Note: Appearance(s) in UEFA Europa League)	1	—		41	1
Rapid Wien	2019–20	Austrian Bundesliga	4	1	—		—		—		4	1
Rapid Wien	Total		32	1	5	0	10	1	0	0	47	2
Sassuolo	2019–20	Serie A	24	2	1	0	—		—		25	2
Sassuolo	2020–21	Serie A	28	0	1	0	—		—		29	0
Sassuolo	2021–22	Serie A	31	0	2	0	—		—		33	0
Sassuolo	2022–23	Serie A	2	0	1	0	—		—		3	0
Sassuolo	Total		85	2	5	0	0	0	0	0	90	2
Fenerbahçe	2023–24	Süper Lig	26	1	3	0	2 (Note: Appearance(s) in UEFA Europa Conference League)	0	0	0	31	1
Fenerbahçe	2024–25	Süper Lig	29	3	3	0	14 (Note: Four appearances in UEFA Champions League, ten appearances in UEFA Europa League)	0	—		46	3
Fenerbahçe	2025–26	Süper Lig	24	1	5	0	10 (Note: Four appearances in UEFA Champions League, six appearances in UEFA Europa League)	0	2 (Note: Appearance(s) in Turkish Super Cup)	0	41	1
Fenerbahçe	2026–27	Süper Lig	4	0	0	0	5 (Note: Appearance(s) in UEFA Champions League)	0	0	0	9	0
Fenerbahçe	Total		83	5	11	0	31	0	2	0	127	5
Career total			223	8	21	0	41	1	2	0	287	9

=== International ===
As of match played 25 June 2026

Appearances and goals by national team and year
National team	Year	Apps	Goals
Turkey	2018	2	0
Turkey	2019	0	0
Turkey	2020	1	0
Turkey	2021	11 (Note: Two appearances in UEFA Euro 2020)	1
Turkey	2022	4	0
Turkey	2023	2	0
Turkey	2024	13 (Note: Four appearances and one goal in UEFA Euro 2024)	1
Turkey	2025	8	1
Turkey	2026	7 (Note: Three appearances in 2026 FIFA World Cup)	0
Total		48	3

Scores and results list Turkey's goal tally first, score column indicates score after each Müldür goal.

List of international goals scored by Mert Müldür
No.	Date	Venue	Cap	Opponent	Score	Result	Competition
1	13 November 2021	Başakşehir Fatih Terim Stadium, Istanbul, Turkey	14	Gibraltar	6–0	6–0	2022 FIFA World Cup qualification
2	18 June 2024	Westfalenstadion, Dortmund, Germany	25	Georgia	1–0	3–1	UEFA Euro 2024
3	4 September 2025	Boris Paichadze National Stadium, Tbilisi, Georgia	37	Georgia	1–0	3–2	2026 FIFA World Cup qualification

== Honours ==
Fenerbahçe

- Turkish Super Cup: 2025

Individual

- UEFA European Championship Fans' Goal of the Tournament: 2024
