= Giorgos Kyriakopoulos =

Greek footballer (born 1996)

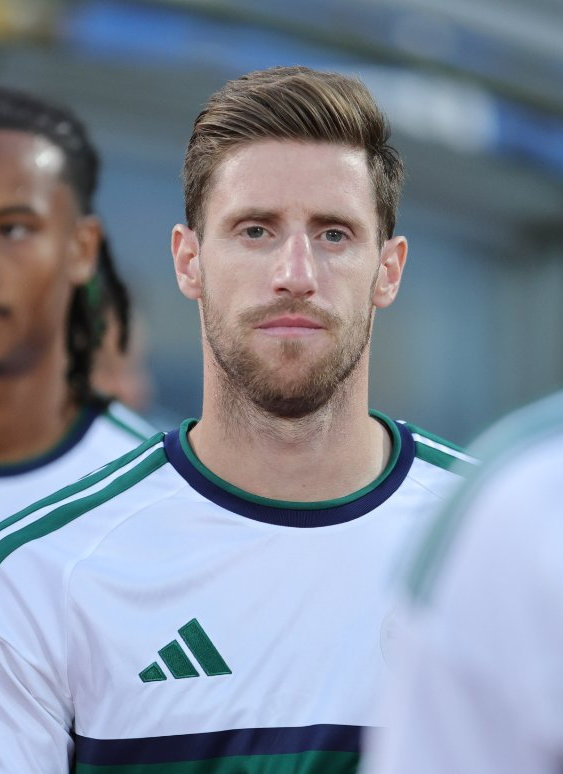
- Kyriakopoulos with Panathinaikos in 2026

Personal information
- Full name: Georgios Kyriakopoulos
- Date of birth: 5 February 1996 (age 30)
- Place of birth: Patras, Greece
- Height: 1.78 m (5 ft 10 in)
- Position: Left-back

Team information
- Current team: Panathinaikos
- Number: 77

Youth career
- –2011: Thyella Patras
- 2011–2013: Asteras Tripolis

Senior career*
Years	Team	Apps	(Gls)
2013–2020	Asteras Tripolis	58	(4)
2015–2016	→ Ergotelis (loan)	12	(0)
2016	→ Lamia (loan)	13	(0)
2019–2020	→ Sassuolo (loan)	26	(0)
2020–2024	Sassuolo	64	(2)
2023	→ Bologna (loan)	12	(0)
2023–2024	→ Monza (loan)	28	(0)
2024–2025	Monza	34	(2)
2025–	Panathinaikos	33	(1)

International career^{‡}
2014	Greece U18	1	(0)
2014–2015	Greece U19	13	(0)
2016–2018	Greece U21	6	(1)
2020–	Greece	11	(0)
- * Club domestic league appearances and goals as of 8 November 2026 ‡ National team caps and goals as of 7 June 2026

Giorgos Kyriakopoulos (Greek: Γιώργος Κυριακόπουλος, born 5 February 1996) is a Greek professional footballer who plays as a left-back or a left wing-back for Super League club Panathinaikos and the Greece national team.

== Club career ==
=== Early career ===
Kyriakopoulos was born in Patras, Greece. As a child he played for Thyella Patras until 2011. At the age of 14, he moved to Asteras Tripolis and was a key member of the U17 and U20 teams of the club.

=== Asteras Tripolis ===
His first professional contract with Asteras Tripolis signed it in 2013. He played as on loan at the Football League with Ergotelis and Lamia.

==== Loan to Ergotelis ====
On 13 August 2015, Kyriakopoulos moved to Ergotelis as a loanee from Asteras Tripolis.

==== Loan to Lamia ====
On 26 January 2016, Kyriakopoulos moved to Lamia as a loanee from Asteras Tripolis.

==== Loan to Sassuolo ====
On 2 September 2019, Kyriakopoulos moved to Sassuolo as a loanee from Asteras Tripolis, for an initial loan fee of €200,000 with a purchase option of €1 million for the summer of 2020.

=== Sassuolo ===
On 22 June 2020, Sassuolo have officially exercised their option to purchase defender Kyriakopoulos from Asteras Tripolis. The 24-year-old left-back had arrived last summer on loan for €200,000 with an option to buy for a further €1.2 million. During his debut Serie A season, Kyriakopoulos has so far made 17 appearances in the Neroverdi jersey and he also contributed with three assists. On 23 May 2021, Kyriakopoulos scored his first goal in Serie A, with an amazing shot from 35 meters opening the score in the last matchday of 2020–21 season against Lazio, but he was sent off in the second half with a second yellow card. It was his first goal with the club in all competitions. On 16 January 2022, he gave two assists in a 4–2 home loss against Hellas Verona.

==== Loan to Bologna ====
On 31 January 2023, Kyriakopoulos moved on loan to Bologna, with an option to buy.

==== Loan to Monza ====
On 28 July 2023, Kyriakopoulos was loaned out to fellow Serie A side Monza for one year, with a conditional obligation to buy.

=== Panathinaikos ===
On 6 June 2025, Kyriakopoulos returned to Greece, signing a four-year contract with Panathinaikos.

== International career ==
Kyriakopoulos made his national team debut on 7 October 2020, in a friendly against Austria.

== Career statistics ==
=== Club ===
As of match played 8 November 2026

Club	Season	League			National cup (Note: Includes Greek Football Cup, Coppa Italia)		Europe		Total	
Club	Season	Division	Apps	Goals	Apps	Goals	Apps	Goals	Apps	Goals
Asteras Tripolis	2013–14	Super League Greece	5	0	1	0	0	0	6	0
Asteras Tripolis	2014–15	Super League Greece	1	0	2	0	0	0	3	0
Asteras Tripolis	2016–17	Super League Greece	8	1	4	0	–		12	1
Asteras Tripolis	2017–18	Super League Greece	18	2	3	0	–		21	2
Asteras Tripolis	2018–19	Super League Greece	24	1	4	0	2 (Note: Appearances in UEFA Europa League)	2	30	3
Asteras Tripolis	2019–20	Super League Greece	2	0	0	0	0	0	2	0
Asteras Tripolis	Total		58	4	14	2	2	2	74	6
Ergotelis (loan)	2015–16	Football League	12	0	4	0	–		16	0
Lamia (loan)	2015–16	Football League	13	0	0	0	–		13	0
Sassuolo	2019–20	Serie A	26	0	0	0	–		26	0
Sassuolo	2020–21	Serie A	23	1	1	0	–		24	1
Sassuolo	2021–22	Serie A	29	0	2	0	–		31	0
Sassuolo	2022–23	Serie A	12	1	1	0	–		13	1
Sassuolo	Total		90	2	4	0	0	0	94	2
Bologna (loan)	2022–23	Serie A	12	0	0	0	–		12	0
Monza (loan)	2023–24	Serie A	28	0	1	0	–		29	0
Monza	2024–25	Serie A	34	2	2	1	–		36	3
Monza	Total		62	2	3	1	0	0	65	3
Panathinaikos	2025–26	Super League Greece	24	1	3	0	16 (Note: Two appearances in UEFA Champions League, Fourteen appearances in UEFA Europa League)	1	43	2
Panathinaikos	2026–27	Super League Greece	9	0	2	0	9 (Note: Appearances in UEFA Conference League)	0	20	0
Panathinaikos	Total		33	1	5	0	24	1	63	2
Career total			280	9	30	1	27	3	338	13
