= Francesco Caputo =

Italian footballer (born 1987)

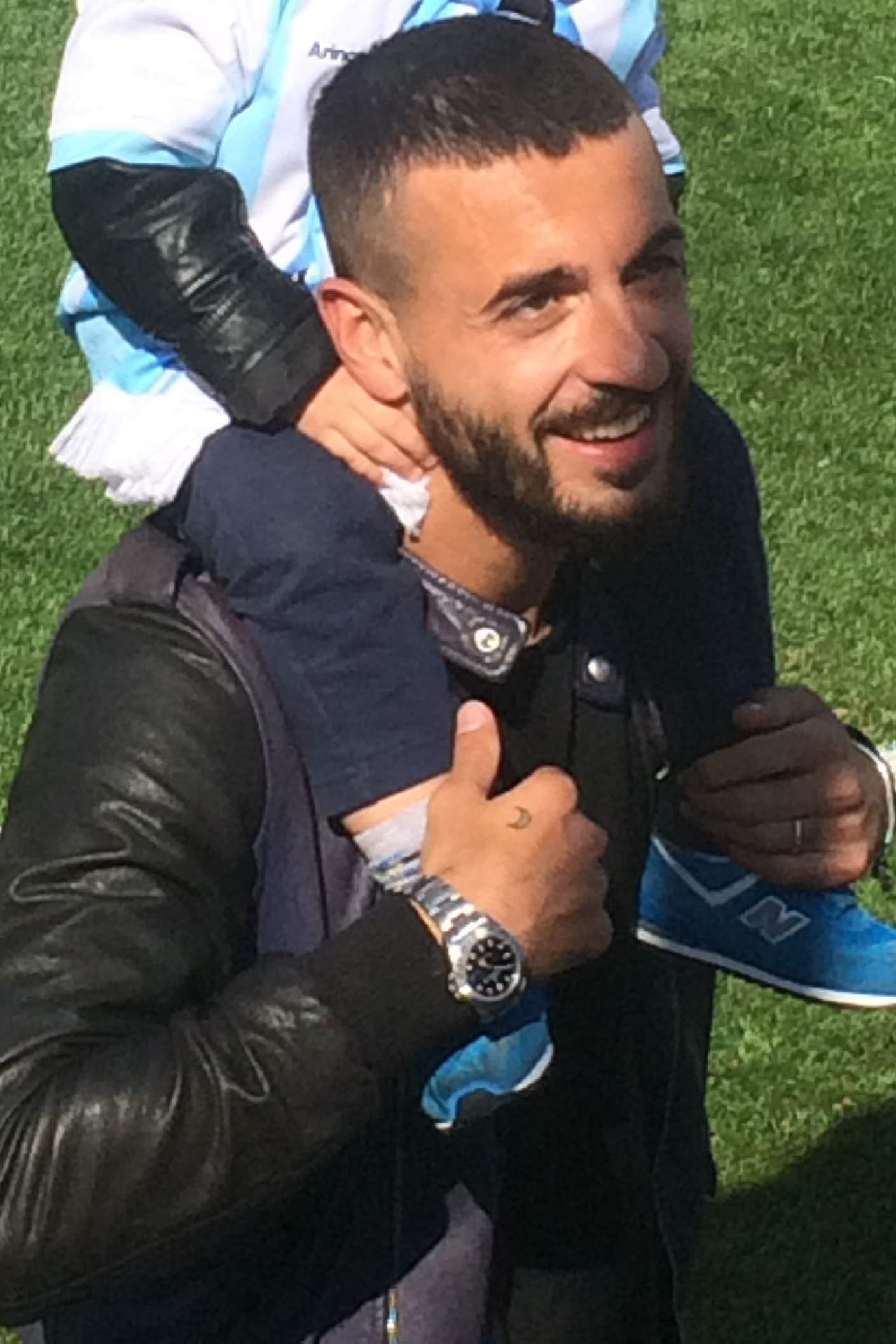
- Caputo with Virtus Entella in 2016

Personal information
- Date of birth: 6 August 1987 (age 39)
- Place of birth: Altamura, Italy
- Height: 1.81 m (5 ft 11 in)
- Position: Forward

Senior career*
Years	Team	Apps	(Gls)
2005–2006	Toritto	20	(14)
2006–2007	Altamura	30	(12)
2007–2008	Noicattaro	29	(11)
2008–2015	Bari	142	(48)
2009–2010	→ Salernitana (loan)	36	(6)
2010–2011	→ Siena (loan)	14	(3)
2015–2017	Virtus Entella	80	(35)
2017–2019	Empoli	79	(42)
2019–2022	Sassuolo	63	(32)
2021–2022	→ Sampdoria (loan)	36	(11)
2022–2023	Sampdoria	15	(1)
2023	→ Empoli (loan)	21	(5)
2023–2024	Empoli	21	(3)

International career^{‡}
2020	Italy	2	(1)
- * Club domestic league appearances and goals as of 25 August 2024 ‡ National team caps and goals as of 11 October 2020

Francesco Caputo (born 6 August 1987), commonly known as Ciccio, is an Italian professional footballer who plays as a forward. He has also represented the Italy national team.

== Club career ==
Caputo started his career in the Pugliesi amateur divisions, first with Toritto and then with Real Altamura, before joining Bari in the summer of 2008. With the club, Caputo won the Serie B title during the 2008–09 season, but he was excluded from Bari's Serie A plans the following season. In mid-2009, he was loaned to Salernitana, along with his teammates Giuseppe Statella and Gianluca Galasso. The following season, he was loaned out to Siena. He returned to Bari in 2011 and remained at the club for four seasons.

In 2015, he joined Entella on loan with an option to buy; at the end of the season, he was signed outright by the club. He remained with Entella for two seasons, scoring 35 goals.

On 18 August 2017, Empoli signed Caputo on a four-year contract for €2.8 million plus bonuses. He helped Empoli win the Serie B title and achieve promotion to Serie A during the 2017–18 season, forming a prolific attacking partnership with Alfredo Donnarumma; together, the pair scored 49 goals, and Caputo finished as the top scorer in the league, with 26 goals, while Donnarumma finished as the second-highest scorer with 23.

On 13 July 2019, Caputo signed to Sassuolo.

On 31 August 2021, Caputo joined Sampdoria on loan with an obligation to buy.

On 2 January 2023, Caputo returned to his former club Empoli on loan with an obligation to buy should his new club avoid relegation. On 26 August 2024, his contract with Empoli was terminated by mutual consent.

== International career ==
Caputo was called up to the senior Italy squad for the UEFA Nations League matches against Bosnia and Herzegovina and Netherlands in September 2020. Caputo made his debut for the national team on 7 October 2020 in a 6–0 home friendly win against Moldova, scoring the match's second goal. In so doing, he became the oldest player in history to score his debut goal for Italy at 33 years and 62 days. This was surpassed by Giacomo Bonaventura, who tallied his inaugural goal at 34 years, one month and 22 days on 14 October 2023 in a Euro 2024 qualifier against Malta.

== Style of play ==
Caputo has been described as a technically gifted forward, with an eye for goal; he mainly plays as a striker, although he is capable of playing anywhere along the front line. Caputo is mainly known in the media for his pace, work rate, movement off the ball, and his powerful and accurate striking ability.

== Career statistics ==
=== Club ===
As of match played 10 August 2024

Appearances and goals by club, season and competition
Club	Season	League			Coppa Italia		Total	
Club	Season	Division	Apps	Goals	Apps	Goals	Apps	Goals
Bari	2008–09	Serie B	27	10	1	0	28	10
Bari	2010–11	Serie A	12	1	3	1	16	2
Bari	2011–12	Serie B	28	9	3	1	31	10
Bari	2012–13	Serie B	36	17	1	0	37	17
Bari	2013–14	Serie B	0	0	0	0	0	0
Bari	2014–15	Serie B	38	11	0	0	38	11
Bari	Total		141	48	8	2	150	50
Salernitana (loan)	2009–10	Serie B	36	6	2	1	38	7
Siena (loan)	2010–11	Serie B	14	3	0	0	14	3
Virtus Entella	2015–16	Serie B	40	17	0	0	40	17
Virtus Entella	2016–17	Serie B	40	18	1	0	41	18
Virtus Entella	2017–18	Serie B	0	0	1	0	1	0
Virtus Entella	Total		80	35	2	0	82	35
Empoli	2017–18	Serie B	41	26	0	0	41	26
Empoli	2018–19	Serie A	38	16	1	0	39	16
Empoli	Total		79	42	1	0	80	42
Sassuolo	2019–20	Serie A	36	21	1	0	37	21
Sassuolo	2020–21	Serie A	25	11	0	0	25	11
Sassuolo	2021–22	Serie A	2	0	0	0	2	0
Sassuolo	Total		63	32	1	0	64	32
Sampdoria (loan)	2021–22	Serie A	36	11	2	0	38	11
Sampdoria	2022–23	Serie A	15	1	2	1	17	2
Empoli (loan)	2022–23	Serie A	21	5	—		21	5
Empoli	2023–24	Serie A	20	3	1	1	21	4
Empoli	2024–25	Serie A	0	0	1	0	1	0
Empoli	Total		20	3	2	1	22	4
Career total			506	186	20	5	526	191

=== International ===
As of match played 11 October 2020

Appearances and goals by national team and year
National team	Year	Apps	Goals
Italy	2020	2	1
Total		2	1

Scores and results list Italy's goal tally first, score column indicates score after each Caputo goal.

List of international goals scored by Francesco Caputo
No.	Date	Venue	Cap	Opponent	Score	Result	Competition
1	7 October 2020	Stadio Artemio Franchi, Florence, Italy	1	Moldova	2–0	6–0	Friendly

== Honours ==
Bari

- Serie B: 2008–09

Empoli

- Serie B: 2017–18

Individual

- Serie B top scorer: 2017–18
