= Hamed Traorè =

Ivorian footballer (born 2000)

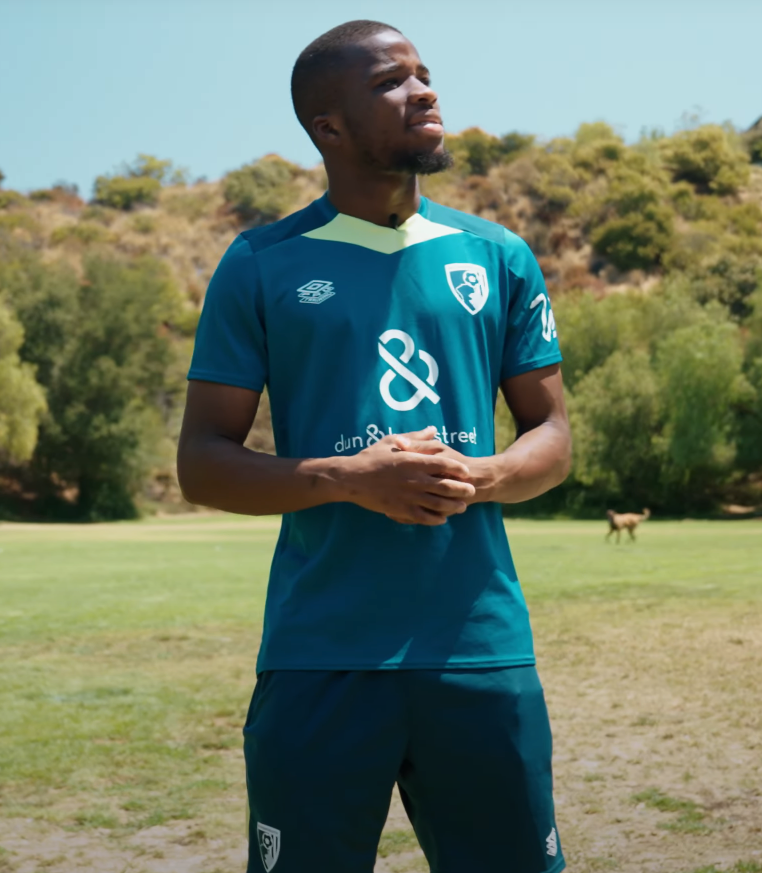
- Traorè with Bournemouth

Personal information
- Full name: Hamed Junior Traorè
- Date of birth: 16 February 2000 (age 26)
- Place of birth: Abidjan, Ivory Coast
- Height: 1.84 m (6 ft 0 in)
- Position: Midfielder

Team information
- Current team: Genoa (on loan from Marseille)
- Number: 25

Youth career
- 2015: Boca Barco
- 2015–2018: Empoli

Senior career*
Years	Team	Apps	(Gls)
2017–2021	Empoli	42	(2)
2019–2021	→ Sassuolo (loan)	66	(9)
2021–2023	Sassuolo	42	(7)
2023	→ Bournemouth (loan)	7	(0)
2023–2026	Bournemouth	4	(0)
2024	→ Napoli (loan)	9	(0)
2024–2025	→ Auxerre (loan)	26	(10)
2025–2026	→ Marseille (loan)	13	(2)
2026–	Marseille	0	(0)
2026–	→ Genoa (loan)	0	(0)

International career^{‡}
2019	Ivory Coast U23	4	(0)
2021–	Ivory Coast	12	(2)
- * Club domestic league appearances and goals as of 16:00, 2 May 2026 (UTC) ‡ National team caps and goals as of 22:50, 31 August 2025 (UTC)

Hamed Junior Traorè (born 16 February 2000) is an Ivorian professional footballer who plays as a midfielder for Serie A club Genoa, on loan from Ligue 1 club Marseille, and the Ivory Coast national team.

== Early life ==
Born in Abidjan, Ivory Coast, Traorè moved to Italy at the age of 15.

== Club career ==
=== Empoli ===
Traorè made his Serie B debut for Empoli on 8 October 2017 in a game against Foggia. On 26 August 2018, he made his debut in Serie A in the defeat against Genoa, substituting Zajc the 85th minute.

On 15 January 2019, Fiorentina agreed a deal to sign Traorè with him remaining on loan at Empoli for the remainder of the season. However, at the end of the season, Empoli chairman Fabrizio Corsi announced the deal had fallen through.

=== Sassuolo ===
On 12 July 2019, Traorè joined Sassuolo on a two-year loan with an option to buy.

=== Bournemouth ===
On 31 January 2023, Traorè joined Premier League side Bournemouth on an initial loan until the end of the season, with the deal being set to turn into a permanent transfer and including a five-year contract. On 16 May, Bournemouth announced that the mandatory obligation to buy for the player had officially been activated.

In December 2023, Bournemouth manager Andoni Iraola publicly confirmed that Traorè had been hospitalized after being diagnosed with malaria, and that he was set to undergo long-term recovery. The following month, following medical tests in Rome, he was cleared to return to full training.

==== Loan to Napoli ====
On 17 January 2024, Traorè returned to Italy and joined Serie A club Napoli on loan with a reported option to buy of €25 million. He only managed to make nine appearances in an underwhelming Napoli side

==== Loan to Auxerre ====
On 27 August 2024, Ligue 1 side Auxerre announced they had completed the loan signing of Traorè from Bournemouth for one year with no purchase clause.

=== Marseille ===
On 29 August 2025, Traorè transferred to Marseille in France, with the transfer structured as a loan for the 2025–26 season, with an obligation to buy at the end of the loan term.

==== Loan to Genoa ====
In July 2026, Traoré joined Serie A club Genoa on a season-long loan with an option to buy. The move marked his return to Italian football after previous spells with Empoli, Sassuolo and Napoli, with Genoa viewing his experience in Serie A as a key factor in the transfer.

== International career ==
Traorè debuted for the Ivory Coast U23s in a pair of 2019 Africa U-23 Cup of Nations qualification matches in March 2019.

He made his debut for the Ivory Coast national team on 6 September 2021 in a World Cup qualifier against Cameroon, a 2–1 home victory. He substituted Jérémie Boga in the 69th minute.

== Personal life ==
In July 2020, an investigation into trafficking of football players was launched by the public prosecutor's office of Parma. Among the involved was Hamed Mamadou Traorè, a distant relative of Hamed and his alleged brother Amad Diallo, who was accused of posing as their father to facilitate their immigration to Italy. The investigation also questioned the relationship between Hamed and Amad.

On 10 February 2021, Traorè was found guilty of violating the Italian Sports Justice Code in order to join the football club "ASD Boca Barco" in 2015 under the name "Hamed Junior Traorè". He was accused of falsifying documents in order to fake a relationship with Hamed Mamadou Traorè, an Ivorian citizen resident in Italy, and request a family reunification. Traorè requested a plea bargain, with the Federal Prosecutor's Office imposing a fine of €48,000.

== Career statistics ==
=== Club ===
As of match played 2 May 2026

Appearances and goals by club, season and competition
Club	Season	League			National cup (Note: Includes Coppa Italia, Coupe de France)		League cup (Note: Includes EFL Cup)		Europe		Other		Total	
Club	Season	Division	Apps	Goals	Apps	Goals	Apps	Goals	Apps	Goals	Apps	Goals	Apps	Goals
Empoli	2017–18	Serie B	10	0	—		—		—		—		10	0
Empoli	2018–19	Serie A	32	2	1	0	—		—		—		33	2
Empoli	Total		42	2	1	0	—		—		—		43	2
Sassuolo (loan)	2019–20	Serie A	31	4	2	1	—		—		—		33	5
Sassuolo (loan)	2020–21	Serie A	35	5	0	0	—		—		—		35	5
Sassuolo (loan)	Total		66	9	2	1	—		—		—		68	10
Sassuolo	2021–22	Serie A	31	7	1	1	—		—		—		32	8
Sassuolo	2022–23	Serie A	11	0	0	0	—		—		—		11	0
Sassuolo	Total		42	7	1	1	—		—		—		43	8
Bournemouth (loan)	2022–23	Premier League	7	0	—		—		—		—		7	0
Bournemouth	2023–24	Premier League	3	0	0	0	3	1	—		—		6	1
Bournemouth	2024–25	Premier League	0	0	0	0	0	0	—		—		0	0
Bournemouth	2025–26	Premier League	1	0	—		0	0	—		—		1	0
Bournemouth	Total		4	0	0	0	3	1	—		—		7	1
Napoli (loan)	2023–24	Serie A	9	0	—		—		2 (Note: Appearances in UEFA Champions League)	0	0	0	11	0
Auxerre (loan)	2024–25	Ligue 1	26	10	0	0	—		—		—		26	10
Marseille (loan)	2025–26	Ligue 1	13	2	3	1	—		2	0	1 (Note: Appearance in Trophée des Champions)	0	19	3
Career total			209	30	7	3	3	1	4	0	1	0	224	34

=== International ===
As of match played 15 November 2024

Appearances and goals by national team and year
National team	Year	Apps	Goals
Ivory Coast	2021	3	0
Ivory Coast	2022	1	0
Ivory Coast	2023	5	2
Ivory Coast	2024	3	0
Total		12	2

Scores and results list Ivory Coast's goal tally first, score column indicates score after each Traorè goal.

List of international goals scored by Hamed Traorè
No.	Date	Venue	Opponent	Score	Result	Competition	Ref.
1	17 November 2023	Alassane Ouattara Stadium, Abidjan, Ivory Coast	Seychelles	3–0	9–0	2026 FIFA World Cup qualification	
2	17 November 2023	Alassane Ouattara Stadium, Abidjan, Ivory Coast	Seychelles	8–0	9–0	2026 FIFA World Cup qualification	

== Honours ==
Ivory Coast U23

- Africa U-23 Cup of Nations runner-up: 2019
