= Jeremy Toljan =

German footballer (born 1994)

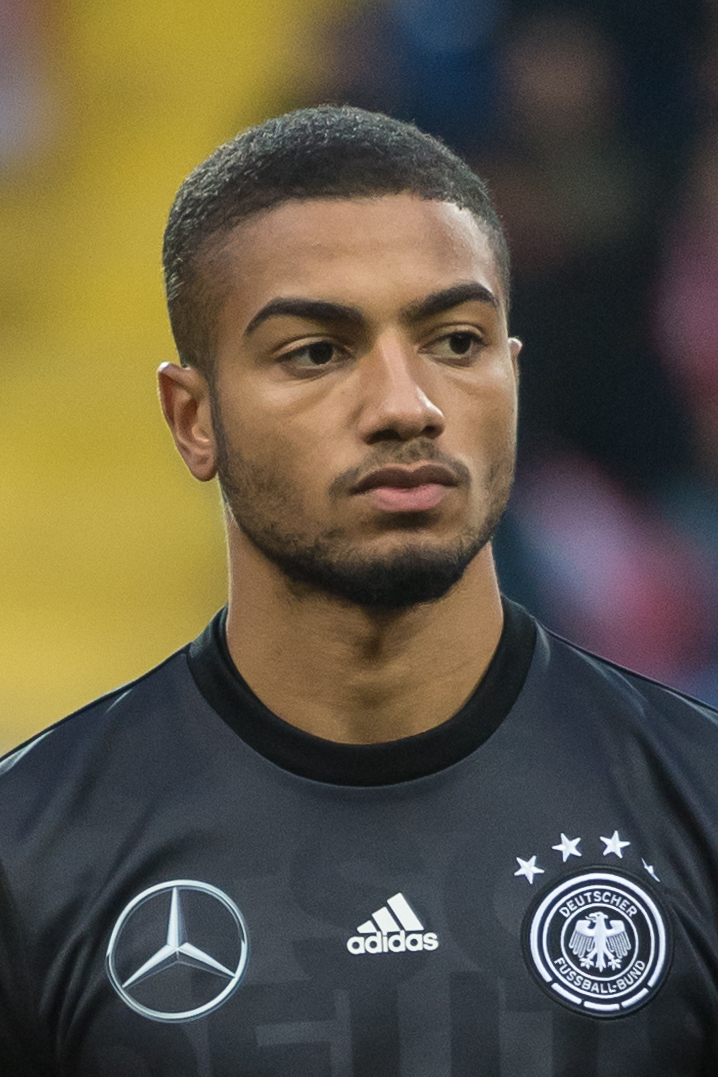
- Toljan with Germany U21 in 2016

Personal information
- Full name: Jeremy Isaiah Richard Toljan
- Date of birth: 8 August 1994 (age 32)
- Place of birth: Stuttgart, Germany
- Height: 1.82 m (6 ft 0 in)
- Position: Right-back

Team information
- Current team: Levante
- Number: 22

Youth career
- 2004–2006: SV Grün-Weiss Sommerrain
- 2008: TSV Steinhaldenfeld
- 2008–2009: Stuttgarter Kickers
- 2009–2011: VfB Stuttgart
- 2011–2013: TSG Hoffenheim

Senior career*
Years	Team	Apps	(Gls)
2012–2014	TSG Hoffenheim II	25	(1)
2013–2017	TSG Hoffenheim	56	(2)
2017–2021	Borussia Dortmund	16	(1)
2018	→ Borussia Dortmund II	1	(0)
2019	→ Celtic (loan)	10	(0)
2019–2021	→ Sassuolo (loan)	55	(1)
2021–2025	Sassuolo	110	(0)
2025–	Levante	37	(1)

International career^{‡}
2010–2011	Germany U17	7	(0)
2013	Germany U19	1	(0)
2013–2015	Germany U20	4	(0)
2015–2017	Germany U21	18	(1)
2016	Germany U23	6	(0)
Medal record
Men's football
Representing Germany
Olympic Games
Silver medal – second place	2016 Rio de Janeiro
UEFA European Under-21 Championship
Winner	2017 Poland
- * Club domestic league appearances and goals as of 27 May 2026 ‡ National team caps and goals as of 30 June 2017

Jeremy Isaiah Richard Toljan (pronounced [tôʎaːn]; born 8 August 1994) is a German professional footballer who plays as a right-back for La Liga club Levante.

== Club career ==
On 5 October 2013, Toljan made his debut for TSG Hoffenheim in a Bundesliga game against Mainz 05. He played the full game, which ended in a 2–2 draw.

In the summer of 2017 Toljan signed a five-year deal with Borussia Dortmund.

In January 2019, Toljan signed a six-month loan deal with Scottish club Celtic.

In July 2019, Italian club Sassuolo announced the signing of Toljan on two seasons-long loan deal. On 1 July 2021, Toljan moved to Sassuolo on a permanent transfer.

Toljan moved to Spain, and joined newly-promoted La Liga club Levante on a free transfer on 8 July 2025, signing a two-year contract.

== International career ==
Toljan has played for German national teams at various age levels. He is also eligible to play for both the United States and Croatia; Toljan has he rejected approaches from both teams to maintain eligibility for Germany.

He was part of the squad for the 2016 Summer Olympics, where Germany won the silver medal.

== Personal life ==
He was born in Stuttgart to an African American father and a Croatian mother. His father, who was an artist, died before he was born.

== Career statistics ==
=== Club ===
As of match played 26 May 2024

Appearances and goals by club, season and competition
Club	Season	League			National cup (Note: Includes DFB-Pokal, Scottish Cup, Coppa Italia)		Europe		Total	
Club	Season	Division	Apps	Goals	Apps	Goals	Apps	Goals	Apps	Goals
TSG Hoffenheim II	2012–13	Regionalliga Südwest	18	1	–		–		18	1
TSG Hoffenheim II	2013–14	Regionalliga Südwest	4	0	–		–		4	0
TSG Hoffenheim II	2014–15	Regionalliga Südwest	3	0	—		—		3	0
TSG Hoffenheim II	Total		25	1	—		—		25	1
TSG Hoffenheim	2013–14	Bundesliga	10	0	1	0	—		11	0
TSG Hoffenheim	2014–15	Bundesliga	6	0	2	0	—		8	0
TSG Hoffenheim	2015–16	Bundesliga	18	1	1	0	—		19	1
TSG Hoffenheim	2016–17	Bundesliga	20	1	1	0	—		21	1
TSG Hoffenheim	2017–18	Bundesliga	2	0	1	0	1 (Note: Appearances in UEFA Champions League)	0	4	0
TSG Hoffenheim	Total		56	2	6	0	1	0	63	2
Borussia Dortmund	2017–18	Bundesliga	16	1	1	0	6 (Note: Four appearances in UEFA Champions League, two appearances in UEFA Europa League)	0	23	1
Borussia Dortmund	2018–19	Bundesliga	0	0	0	0	0	0	0	0
Borussia Dortmund	Total		16	1	1	0	6	0	23	1
Borussia Dortmund II	2018–19	Regionalliga West	1	0	0	0	—		1	0
Celtic (loan)	2018–19	Scottish Premiership	10	0	2	0	2 (Note: Appearances in UEFA Europa League)	0	14	0
Sassuolo (loan)	2019–20	Serie A	29	1	1	0	—		30	1
Sassuolo (loan)	2020–21	Serie A	26	0	0	0	—		26	0
Sassuolo (loan)	Total		55	1	1	0	—		56	1
Sassuolo	2021–22	Serie A	20	0	0	0	—		20	0
Sassuolo	2022–23	Serie A	31	0	0	0	—		31	0
Sassuolo	2023–24	Serie A	25	0	2	0	—		27	0
Sassuolo	Total		76	0	2	0	—		78	0
Career total			239	5	12	0	9	0	260	5

== Honours ==
Celtic

- Scottish Premiership: 2018–19
- Scottish Cup: 2018–19

Sassuolo

- Serie B: 2024–25

Germany U21

- UEFA European Under-21 Championship: 2017

Germany U23

- Olympic Silver Medal: 2016

Individual

- UEFA European Under-21 Championship Team of the Tournament: 2017
