= Maxime Lopez =

French footballer (born 1997)

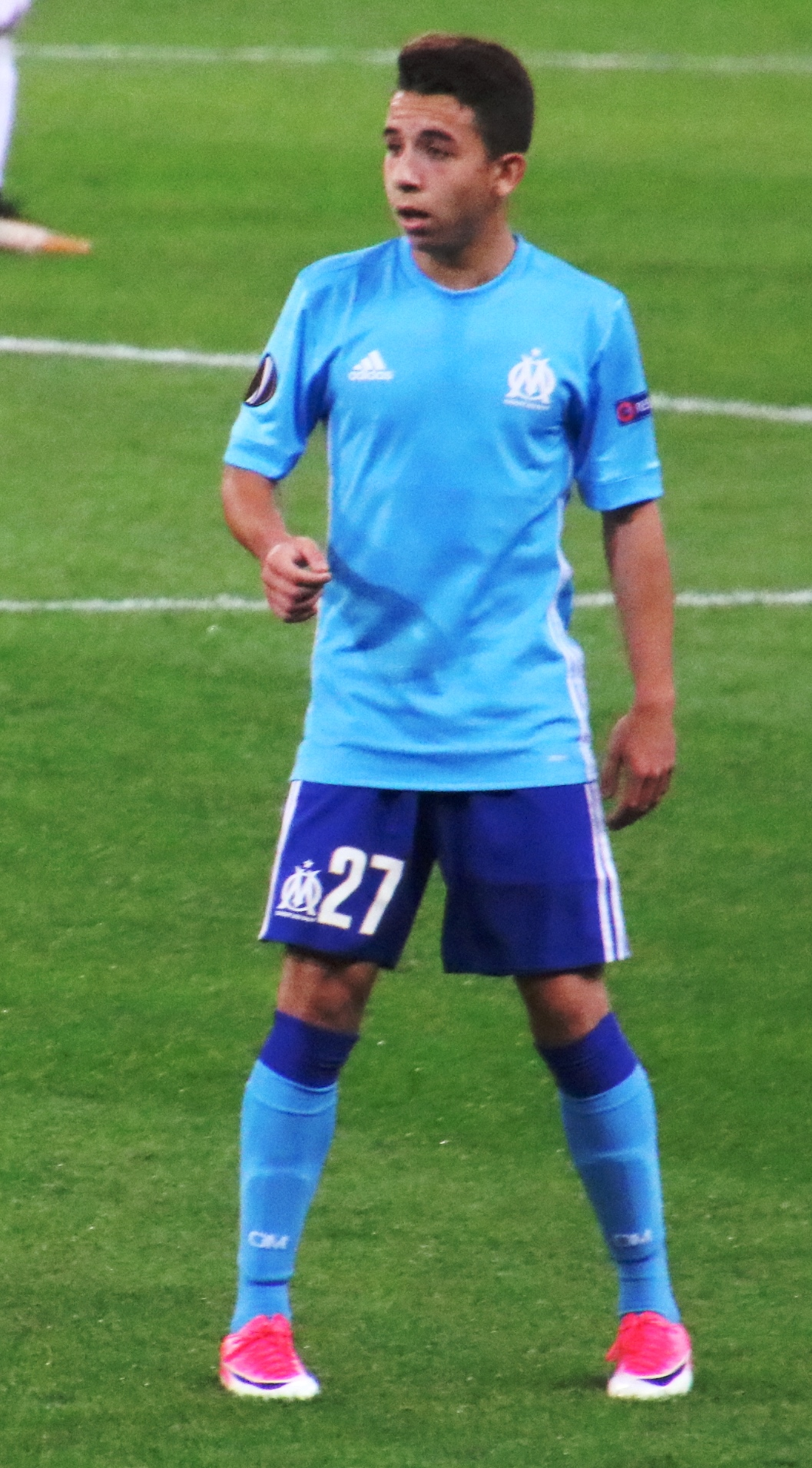
- Lopez with Marseille in 2017

Personal information
- Full name: Maxime Baila Lopez
- Date of birth: 4 December 1997 (age 28)
- Place of birth: Marseille, France
- Height: 1.67 m (5 ft 6 in)
- Position: Defensive midfielder

Team information
- Current team: Paris FC
- Number: 21

Youth career
- 2003–2010: Burel FC
- 2010–2016: Marseille

Senior career*
Years	Team	Apps	(Gls)
2014–2016	Marseille II	30	(3)
2016–2021	Marseille	113	(4)
2020–2021	→ Sassuolo (loan)	22	(1)
2021–2024	Sassuolo	74	(3)
2023–2024	→ Fiorentina (loan)	19	(0)
2024–	Paris FC	53	(3)

International career
2016–2017	France U20	3	(0)
2017–2019	France U21	13	(0)
- * Club domestic league appearances and goals as of 19 May 2026

Maxime Baila Lopez (Spanish: López, pronounced [ˈlopeθ]; born 4 December 1997) is a French professional footballer who plays as a defensive midfielder for Ligue 1 club Paris FC.

Lopez is an academy graduate of Marseille, having made his professional debut in August 2016 and appeared in 150 games for the side. He signed for Sassuolo in 2021 following a loan deal at the club. He also represented France internationally at youth level.

== Club career ==
=== Marseille ===
==== Early career ====
Born in Marseille, Maxime Lopez is a product of Olympique de Marseille's football academy, having joined in 2010 from F.C. Burel. During his time in the academy he represented the club at U-19 level in the UEFA Youth League. He signed his first professional contract with Marseille on 12 July 2014, and was handed his non-competitive debut by interim manager Franck Passi on the same date two years later in a friendly encounter with Lausanne Sport.

==== 2016–17 season ====
Lopez made his senior debut for Marseille on 21 August 2016, coming on as a 60th-minute substitute for Bouna Sarr in a 2–1 Ligue 1 away defeat to Guingamp and, just 18-minutes after entering the field of play, assisted Florian Thauvin for Marseille's only goal. His home debut at the Stade Vélodrome came on 16 October in Marseille's 1–0 Ligue 1 win over Metz. Later that month, on 30 October, he made his first start for Marseille in a 0–0 Ligue 1 home draw with Bordeaux. On 20 November, Lopez made 129 touches during Marseille's 1-0 Ligue 1 home win against Caen, which was the most ever by a Marseille player in a single match in recorded history. He then scored the first goal of his senior club career on 10 December, netting the opening goal in Marseille's 2–1 Ligue 1 away victory over Dijon. Lopez was later named Ligue 1 Player of the Month in recognition of his performances throughout the month of December. On 30 April 2017, he scored twice in a 5–1 Ligue 1 away win over Caen, thereby becoming the youngest Marseille player in 30 years to score a brace in Ligue 1. He ultimately made 35 appearances across all competitions and scored three times in his debut season with Marseille.

==== 2017–18 season ====
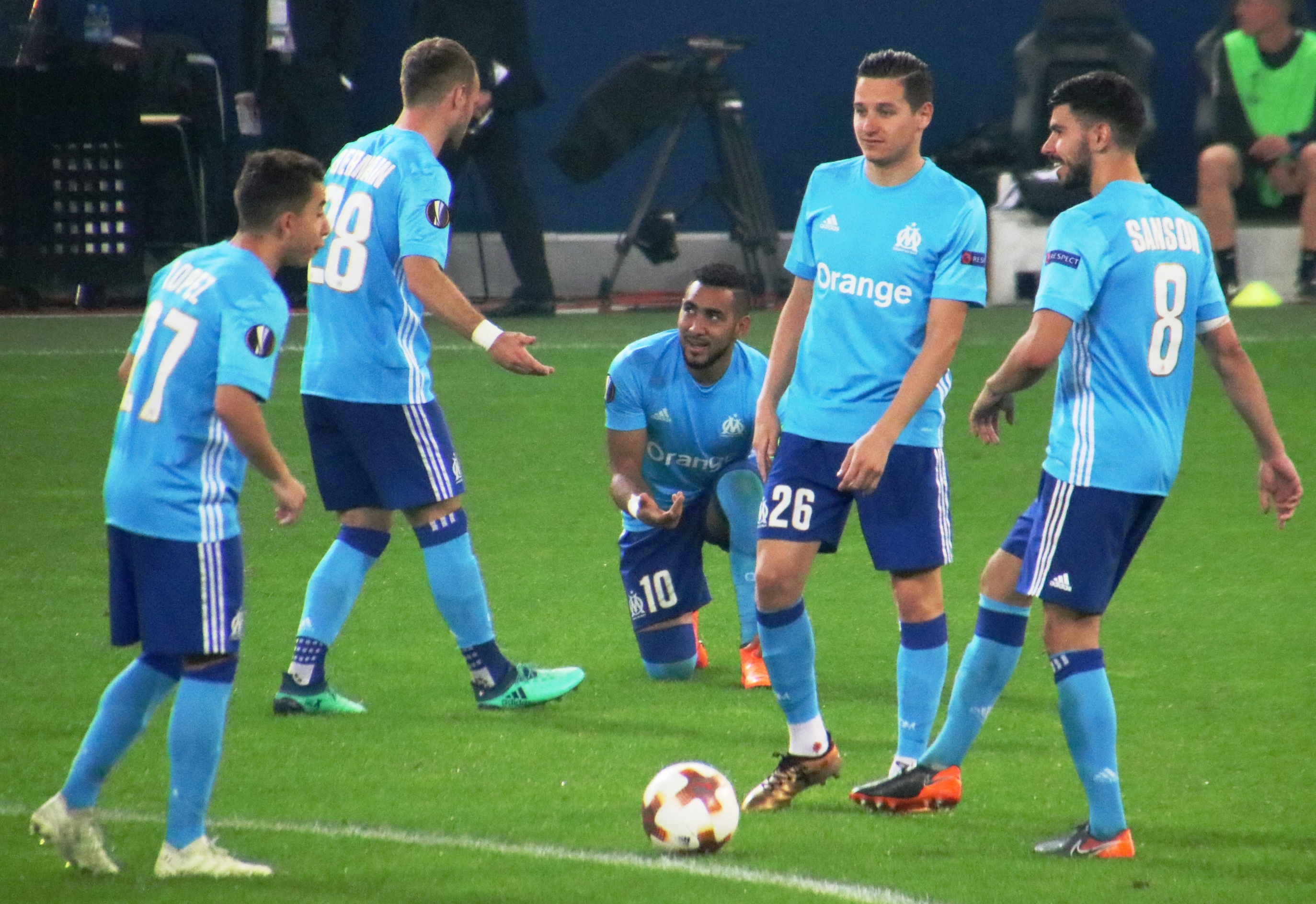
Lopez warming up with teammates Florian Thauvin and Morgan Sanson ahead of Marseille's Europa League encounter with Red Bull Salzburg.

The following season, Lopez temporarily retained his starting berth in Marseille's midfield under coach Rudi Garcia, but lost his position following a dip in form during the campaign's opening matches. On 19 October 2017, he scored his first and only goal of the season, and his first ever in European competitions, when he netted in a 2–1 Europa League group-stage win over Vitória de Guimarães. He made his 50th league appearance for Marseille on 15 April 2018 in a 3–2 victory over Troyes. He continued to feature regularly in the club's Europa League campaign and helped the side reach the final of the competition, where he appeared as a substitute in a 3–0 loss to Spanish side, Atlético Madrid.

==== 2018–19 season ====
Lopez scored his first goal of the following campaign, and his first in the league since April 2017, in a 1–1 draw with Monaco on 15 January 2019. His performance earned him the man of the match award and saw him named as the highest performing player in the league over the weekend. The following week, he made his 100th appearance for the club in a 2–1 league loss to Saint-Étienne.

=== Sassuolo ===
On 5 October 2020, Lopez joined Serie A club Sassuolo on a season-long loan with option to buy. The deal was made permanent in April 2021 after he had played over 30 minutes in 20 Serie A games, triggering an obligation to buy from Marseille. Lopez's contract at Sassuolo would now keep him at the club until June 2025.

==== Loan to Fiorentina ====
On 1 September 2023, Lopez moved to Fiorentina on loan with an option to buy.

=== Paris FC ===
On 29 August 2024, Lopez signed a three year contract with Paris FC in the French second division after Sassuolo were relegated.

== Style of play ==
Due to his Algerian lineage and similar progression through Marseille's academy, Lopez has often been likened to former Marseille midfielder Samir Nasri. Though small in stature, Lopez has been described as a versatile playmaker capable of fluid movement and quick and intelligent passing.

== Personal life ==
Lopez was born in France to a French father of partially Spanish origin, and an Algerian mother. He holds French and Algerian nationalities. His older brother, Julien is also a footballer who plays in the Ligue 1 with Paris FC and was a youth international for Algeria.

== Career statistics ==
As of match played 1 November 2024

Appearances and goals by club, season and competition
Club	Season	League			National cup (Note: Includes Coupe de France and Coppa Italia)		Continental		Other		Total	
Club	Season	League	Apps	Goals	Apps	Goals	Apps	Goals	Apps	Goals	Apps	Goals
Marseille II	2013–14	CFA 2	2	0	—		—		—		2	0
Marseille II	2014–15	CFA 2	2	0	—		—		—		2	0
Marseille II	2015–16	CFA	23	2	—		—		—		23	2
Marseille II	2016–17	CFA	3	1	—		—		—		3	1
Marseille II	Total		30	3	—		—		—		30	3
Marseille	2016–17	Ligue 1	30	3	3	0	—		2 (Note: Appearance(s) in Coupe de la Ligue)	0	35	3
Marseille	2017–18	Ligue 1	24	0	4	0	17 (Note: Appearances in UEFA Europa League)	1	0	0	45	1
Marseille	2018–19	Ligue 1	32	1	1	0	5	0	1	0	39	1
Marseille	2019–20	Ligue 1	23	0	4	0	—		0	0	27	0
Marseille	2020–21	Ligue 1	4	0	0	0	0	0	0	0	4	0
Marseille	Total		113	4	12	0	22	1	3	0	150	5
Sassuolo (loan)	2020–21 (Note: Lopez was on loan until 12 April 2021, when the buy option in his deal at Sassuolo was exercised.)	Serie A	22	1	1	0	—		—		23	1
Sassuolo	2020–21	Serie A	7	1	0	0	—		—		7	1
Sassuolo	2021–22	Serie A	35	2	2	0	—		—		37	2
Sassuolo	2022–23	Serie A	30	0	1	0	—		—		31	0
Sassuolo	2023–24	Serie A	2	0	1	0	—		—		3	0
Sassuolo	Total		96	4	5	0	—		—		101	4
Fiorentina (loan)	2023–24	Serie A	19	0	2	0	10 (Note: Appearances in UEFA Europa Conference League)	1	—		31	1
Paris FC	2024–25	Ligue 2	9	2	0	0	0	0	0	0	9	2
Career total			267	13	19	0	32	2	3	0	321	15

== Honours ==
Marseille

- UEFA Europa League runner-up: 2017–18

Individual

- UNFP Player of the Month: December 2016
- UNFP Ligue 2 Team of the Year: 2024–25
