= Davide Manarelli =

Italian footballer (born 2002)

Personal information
- Date of birth: 1 February 2002 (age 24)
- Place of birth: Dalmine, Italy
- Height: 1.77 m (5 ft 10 in)
- Position: Left-back

Youth career
- 2009–2012: Osio Sopra
- 2012–2016: AlbinoLeffe
- 2016–2019: Renate
- 2019–2021: Sassuolo

Senior career*
Years	Team	Apps	(Gls)
2021	→ Renate (loan)	0	(0)
2021–2022	→ Paganese (loan)	28	(0)
2022–2023	Viterbese	3	(0)
2023	→ Virtus Francavilla (loan)	0	(0)
- * Club domestic league appearances and goals as of 23 April 2023

Davide Manarelli (born 1 February 2002) is an Italian footballer who plays as a left-back.

== Club career ==
Born in Dalmine, a comune near Bergamo, Manarelli started playing football at a local grassroots club in Osio Sopra in 2009, before joining AlbinoLeffe three years later, and then Renate in 2016. After winning a national Under-16 title and finishing runners-up in the Under-17 championship with the latter club, in the summer of 2019 he was scouted and signed on loan by Sassuolo, where he initially joined the Under-18 team, together with his club-mate and fellow loanee Martino Ripamonti. Both deals were then made permanent at the start of the following season, with Manarelli spending one more season in the Campionato Primavera.

On 19 July 2021, he officially started his senior career by returning to Renate on a season-long loan. However, on 11 August, the spell was cut short, as Manarelli joined fellow Serie C side Paganese with the same formula, instead. He subsequently made his professional debut on 21 August, as he started the league cup match against Foggia, which ended in a 2-0 loss for his side. The full-back played regularly for the club in the third tier, as Paganese eventually got relegated to Serie D after losing the play-out with Fidelis Andria, despite a 1-1 final score on aggregate, since the latter club were better placed in the league table.

On 2 July 2022, Manarelli officially joined Viterbese on a permanent deal, signing a three-year deal with the club, who had just escaped relegation from Serie C in the previous season. Having collected three appearances in the first part of the 2022–23 season, on 31 January 2023 he joined fellow third-tier side Virtus Francavilla on loan until the end of the season, as part of a swap deal that saw Federico Mastropietro go the opposite way.

== International career ==
Although he has never represented Italy in an international match so far, Manarelli took part in a joint training camp for the under-18 and under-19 national teams in January 2020.

== Style of play ==
Manarelli is primarily a left-back, who can also play as a left wing-back in a five-men midfield.

He cited Marcelo as his biggest source of inspiration.

== Career statistics ==
=== Club ===
As of match played 24 September 2022

Club	Season	League			Coppa Italia		Other		Total	
Club	Season	Division	Apps	Goals	Apps	Goals	Apps	Goals	Apps	Goals
Paganese (loan)	2021–22	Serie C	27	0	—		2 (Note: One appearance in Coppa Italia Serie C; one appearance in Serie C promotion play-offs.)	0	29	0
Viterbese	2022–23	Serie C	3	0	—		0	0	3	0
Virtus Francavilla (loan)	2022–23	Serie C	0	0			0	0	0	0
Career total			30	0	0	0	0	0	32	0
