= Manuel Locatelli =

Italian footballer (born 1998)

Manuel Locatelli Cavaliere OMRI
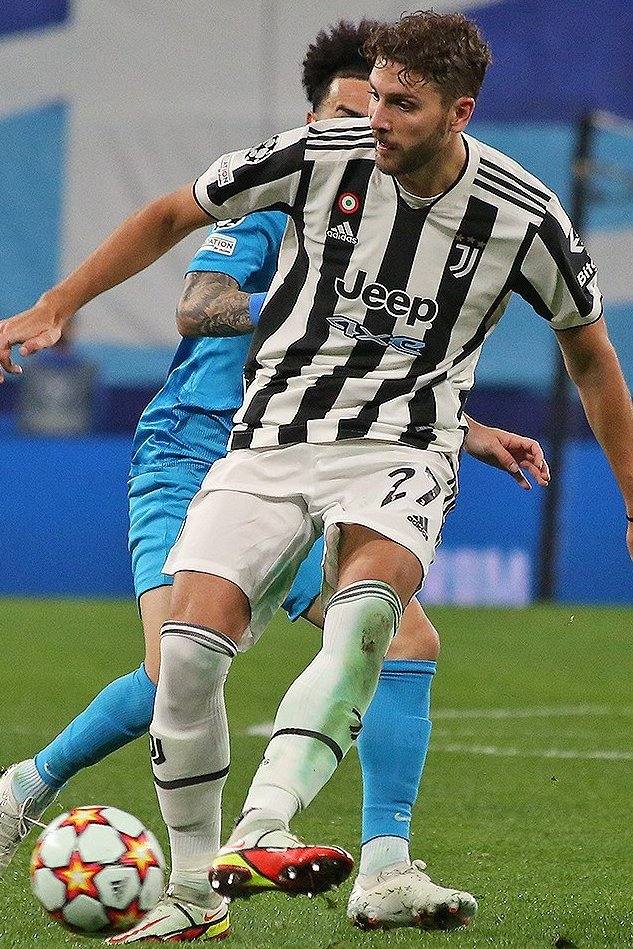
- Locatelli playing for Juventus in 2021

Personal information
- Full name: Manuel Locatelli
- Date of birth: 8 January 1998 (age 28)
- Place of birth: Lecco, Italy
- Height: 1.85 m (6 ft 1 in)
- Position: Defensive midfielder

Team information
- Current team: Juventus
- Number: 5

Youth career
- 2007–2009: Atalanta
- 2009–2016: AC Milan

Senior career*
Years	Team	Apps	(Gls)
2016–2019	AC Milan	48	(2)
2018–2019	→ Sassuolo (loan)	29	(2)
2019–2023	Sassuolo	67	(4)
2021–2023	→ Juventus (loan)	63	(3)
2023–	Juventus	111	(4)

International career^{‡}
2013	Italy U15	5	(0)
2014	Italy U16	2	(0)
2013–2015	Italy U17	25	(1)
2015–2016	Italy U19	16	(1)
2017–2019	Italy U21	23	(2)
2020–	Italy	36	(3)
Medal record
Men's Football
Representing Italy
UEFA European Championship
Winner	2020 Europe
UEFA Nations League
Third place	2021 Italy
UEFA European Under-19 Championship
Runner-up	2016 Germany
CONMEBOL–UEFA Cup of Champions
Runner-up	2022 England
- * Club domestic league appearances and goals as of 23:09, 6 September 2026 (UTC) ‡ National team caps and goals as of 31 March 2026

Manuel Locatelli Cavaliere OMRI (born 8 January 1998) is an Italian professional footballer who plays as a defensive midfielder for Serie A club Juventus, which he captains, and the Italy national team.

After coming through the club's youth system, Locatelli made his professional debut with AC Milan, helping them win the 2016 Supercoppa Italiana. He moved to Sassuolo in 2018, before joining Juventus in 2021.

Locatelli represents Italy in international football and was part of the country's victorious UEFA Euro 2020 squad.

== Club career ==
=== Early career ===
Born in Lecco, Lombardy, Locatelli began his career with Atalanta, before moving to AC Milan at the age of 11 years. With the Rossoneri he progressed through each youth category, from Esordienti to Primavera. In March 2015, Locatelli signed his first professional contract with Milan, effective from 1 July 2015 until 30 June 2018.

=== AC Milan ===
Locatelli received his first-ever call-up to Milan's senior team ahead of the away game against Udinese played on 22 September 2015; he, however, remained an unused substitute. Later that season, he was promoted into the first team by the then Milan head coach Siniša Mihajlović.

He made his Serie A debut aged 18, on 21 April 2016, replacing Andrea Poli after 87 minutes in a 0−0 home draw against Carpi. On 14 May 2016 he made his debut as a starter, in the last league match of the season against Roma at the San Siro.

==== 2016–17 season ====
He made his season debut in a 1–0 victory over Sampdoria, appearing as a second-half substitute. On 2 October 2016, after coming on as a substitute for captain Riccardo Montolivo, Locatelli scored his first Serie A goal with his first ever shot, in a dramatic 4–3 win over Sassuolo. Beginning the season on the bench, Locatelli received his first start of the season on 16 October at Chievo, taking over the deep-lying playmaker role in midfield vacated by Montolivo, who suffered a long-term injury over the international break. On 22 October, Locatelli scored with his second ever Serie A shot on target, the only goal in a rival match against Juventus, a strike with the outside of his right foot that hit the underside of the crossbar, and rifled past keeper Gianluigi Buffon.

Following a series of excellent performances, Locatelli received and accepted the offer to extend his contract until 30 June 2020, with the rise in pay.

On 25 January 2017, Locatelli was sent off for the first time of his career after receiving two yellow cards in 2016–17 Coppa Italia Quarter Final match against Juventus.

==== 2017–18 season ====
Locatelli began the season as a starter in the second leg of Milan's Europa League qualification match against CS U Craiova, playing a vital role in Milan's 2–0 win on 3 August 2017. However, Montolivo's eventual recovery, combined with the arrival of Lucas Biglia and frequent changes of formation under Vincenzo Montella, started to limit his playing time.

In November 2017, Montella was dismissed and replaced by Gennaro Gattuso, who also viewed Locatelli as more of a backup for either Biglia or Montolivo than a starting lineup player. He finished the season with only 15 starts (of which only 5 were in Serie A) and 18 sub-ins.

=== Sassuolo ===
In the summer of 2018, Milan loaned in Tiémoué Bakayoko and suggested that Locatelli join one of the lower-ranking Serie A teams on loan, preferably without a buy-out option. Locatelli agreed to depart yet submitted a full transfer request, later citing a perceived lack of trust in him from the club as the main reason for his decision. On 13 August 2018, Locatelli transferred to Sassuolo on loan with an obligation to buy. In his debut season for the neroverdi he made 31 appearances and scored 3 goals (against Catania in Coppa Italia and Cagliari and Chievo Verona in Serie A).

=== Juventus ===
On 18 August 2021, Juventus announced the signing of Locatelli on an initial two-year loan, with Juventus holding an obligation to then purchase the player for €25 million payable over three years plus €12.5 million in potential add-ons. At Juventus, Locatelli reunited with Massimiliano Allegri, who had once been the head coach of Milan and called up Locatelli to train with the senior team in 2013 aged 15. On 22 August, Locatelli debuted for Juventus in a 2–2 draw against Udinese, coming on as a substitute in the 90th minute. On 26 September, Locatelli scored his first goal for Juventus, the winning goal of a 3–2 home win over Sampdoria. In the 86th minute of play, he scored the lone goal of a 1–0 win against Derby della Mole rivals Torino on 2 October.

On 22 October 2023, exactly seven years since the 1–0 home win for Milan against Juventus in the 2016–17 Serie A, courtesy of the goal by Locatelli, he faced Milan as an opponent and scored the only goal for Juventus in the 1–0 win at San Siro. On 9 November 2023, Locatelli signed a five-year contract extension with Juventus.

During the 2024–25 season, Locatelli assumed the club's captaincy under coach Thiago Motta. On 25 May 2025, he scored from the penalty spot in a 3–2 away victory over Venezia, securing his club's fourth-place finish in the league and qualification for the Champions League.

== International career ==
=== Youth ===
Locatelli was part of the Italy U17 team at the 2015 UEFA European Under-17 Championship. He also took part in the 2016 Under-19 Championship with the under-19 side, as Italy finished runners-up. Locatelli made his debut with the Italy U21 team on 23 March 2017, in a friendly 2–1 win against Poland. In June 2017, he was included in the Italy under-21 squad for the 2017 UEFA European Under-21 Championship by manager Luigi Di Biagio. Italy were eliminated by Spain in the semi-finals on 27 June, following a 3–1 defeat. Locatelli additionally took part in the 2019 UEFA European Under-21 Championship.

=== Senior ===
Locatelli debuted with the Italian senior squad on 7 September 2020, playing as a starter in a 1–0 UEFA Nations League victory against the Netherlands in Amsterdam. On 28 March 2021, Locatelli scored his first goal for Italy, the second of a 2–0 away victory over Bulgaria in a 2022 World Cup qualification match. In June 2021, Locatelli was included in Italy's squad for UEFA Euro 2020 by manager Roberto Mancini. On 16 June, he scored two goals in Italy's second group stage match, a 3–0 win against Switzerland. Although he started in Italy's first two group games of the tournament, he was later relegated to the bench following the recovery of the injured Marco Verratti. On 6 July, in the semi-final of the competition against Spain, Locatelli came on as a substitute for Nicolò Barella late in the second half of regulation time; following a 1–1 draw after extra-time, he took Italy's first spot-kick in resulting shoot-out, which was saved by Unai Simón, although Italy ultimately advanced to the final 4–2 on penalties.

On 11 July, Locatelli won the European Championship with Italy following a 3–2 penalty shoot-out victory over England at Wembley Stadium in the final, after a 1–1 draw in extra-time; Locatelli made a substitute appearance during the final, coming on for Verratti in the first half of extra-time.

== Style of play ==
Locatelli is primarily deployed as a deep-lying midfielder, usually operating in a defensive role in front of the team's defence, in a position similar to that of his idol Andrea Pirlo, due to his ability to create chances or dictate the tempo of his team's play in midfield with his passing range. A versatile midfielder, he can also play in a box-to-box role, or as a mezzala in a 4–3–3 formation, although this is not his preferred position; he has occasionally even been used as an attacking midfielder, a position in which he was initially fielded in his youth, before being moved into a deeper midfield role.

While not particularly fast, he is an elegant and quick-thinking player who possesses excellent vision, passing, ball control, technique, and dribbling skills, as well as a powerful and accurate shot from long range. His reading of the game, defensive work-rate, tactical intelligence, and ball-winning abilities are also optimal for a defensive midfielder. His playing style has been compared to that of Argentine midfielder Fernando Redondo, but with more of an offensive mindset, due to his ability to make late attacking runs off the ball from behind; he has also been likened to other playmakers such as Xavi, Zinedine Zidane, and Demetrio Albertini. Not long before Locatelli signed with Juventus, former long-term club player Alessio Tacchinardi compared him to himself and Antonio Conte, calling Locatelli a mix of both. Considered to be a promising young player, in 2015 The Guardian named him one of the 50 best young players in the world born in 1998.

== Personal life ==
On 21 June 2022, he married Thessa Lachovic. On 16 October, his wife announced that she was pregnant.

== Career statistics ==
=== Club ===
As of match played 6 September 2026

Appearances and goals by club, season and competition
Club	Season	League			Coppa Italia		Europe		Other		Total	
Club	Season	Division	Apps	Goals	Apps	Goals	Apps	Goals	Apps	Goals	Apps	Goals
AC Milan	2015–16	Serie A	2	0	0	0	—		—		2	0
AC Milan	2016–17	Serie A	25	2	2	0	—		1 (Note: Appearance in Supercoppa Italiana)	0	28	2
AC Milan	2017–18	Serie A	21	0	3	0	9 (Note: Appearances in UEFA Europa League)	0	—		33	0
AC Milan	Total		48	2	5	0	9	0	1	0	63	2
Sassuolo (loan)	2018–19	Serie A	29	2	2	1	—		—		31	3
Sassuolo	2019–20	Serie A	33	0	1	0	—		—		34	0
Sassuolo	2020–21	Serie A	34	4	0	0	—		—		34	4
Sassuolo	Sassuolo total		96	6	3	1	—		—		99	7
Juventus (loan)	2021–22	Serie A	31	3	4	0	7 (Note: Appearances in UEFA Champions League)	0	1	0	43	3
Juventus (loan)	2022–23	Serie A	32	0	4	0	13 (Note: Five appearances in UEFA Champions League, eight appearances in UEFA Europa League)	0	—		49	0
Juventus	2023–24	Serie A	36	1	4	0	—		—		40	1
Juventus	2024–25	Serie A	36	2	2	0	9	0	4 (Note: One appearance in Supercoppa Italiana, three appearances in FIFA Club World Cup)	0	51	2
Juventus	2025–26	Serie A	36	1	2	1	9	1	—		47	3
Juventus	2026–27	Serie A	3	0	0	0	0	0	—		3	0
Juventus	Juventus total		174	7	16	1	38	1	5	0	233	9
Career total			318	15	24	2	47	1	6	0	395	18

=== International ===
As of match played 31 March 2026

Appearances and goals by national team and year
National team	Year	Apps	Goals
Italy	2020	6	0
Italy	2021	14	3
Italy	2022	4	0
Italy	2023	2	0
Italy	2024	4	0
Italy	2025	4	0
Italy	2026	2	0
Total		36	3

Scores and results list Italy's goal tally first, score column indicates score after each Locatelli goal

List of international goals scored by Manuel Locatelli
No.	Date	Venue	Cap	Opponent	Score	Result	Competition
1	28 March 2021	Vasil Levski National Stadium, Sofia, Bulgaria	8	Bulgaria	2–0	2–0	2022 FIFA World Cup qualification
2	16 June 2021	Stadio Olimpico, Rome, Italy	12	Switzerland	1–0	3–0	UEFA Euro 2020
3	16 June 2021	Stadio Olimpico, Rome, Italy	12	Switzerland	2–0	3–0	UEFA Euro 2020

== Honours ==
AC Milan

- Supercoppa Italiana: 2016

Juventus

- Coppa Italia: 2023–24

Italy U19

- UEFA European Under-19 Championship runner-up: 2016

Italy

- UEFA European Championship: 2020
- UEFA Nations League third place: 2020–21

Individual

- Premio Bulgarelli Number 8: 2020
- Serie A Team of the Season: 2024–25

Orders

- Knight of the Order of Merit of the Italian Republic: 2021
