= Matteo Campani =

Italian footballer

Personal information
- Date of birth: 19 August 2000 (age 26)
- Place of birth: Florence, Italy
- Height: 1.89 m (6 ft 2 in)
- Position: Goalkeeper

Team information
- Current team: Vigor Senigallia

Youth career
- –2018: Pisa
- 2018–2019: Sassuolo

Senior career*
Years	Team	Apps	(Gls)
2017–2018	Pisa	0	(0)
2018–2023	Sassuolo	0	(0)
2019–2021	→ Paganese (loan)	15	(0)
2021–2023	→ Vis Pesaro (loan)	6	(0)
2023–2024	Pisa	0	(0)
2024–	Vigor Senigallia	0	(0)
- * Club domestic league appearances and goals as of 1 July 2024

Matteo Campani (born 19 August 2000) is an Italian professional footballer who plays as a goalkeeper for Serie D club Vigor Senigallia.

== Career ==
Campani was raised in the youth teams of Pisa and began to receive call-ups to the senior squad late in the 2016–17 Serie B season. He made his senior debut for Pisa on 29 July 2018 in a Coppa Italia game against Triestina. The game reached the shoot-out and Pisa advanced thanks to a kick saved by Campani. In the next Cup round, he saved two penalties again in the shoot-out to eliminate Cremonese. In the next round, Pisa eliminated Parma as Campani kept a clean sheet.

On 17 August 2018 (5 days after the Parma game), Campani signed with the Serie A club Sassuolo, where he was assigned to the Under-19 squad.

On 30 July 2019, he joined Serie C club Paganese on a season-long loan. He made his professional Serie C debut for Paganese on 27 October 2019 in a game against Picerno. He started the game and played the full match as Paganese lost 0–2. On 21 August 2020 the loan has been extended.

On 17 July 2021, he moved on a new loan to Serie C club Vis Pesaro. The loan was renewed for the 2022–23 season.

On 24 August 2023, Campani returned to Pisa.
