= Marco Pinato =

Italian footballer (born 1995)

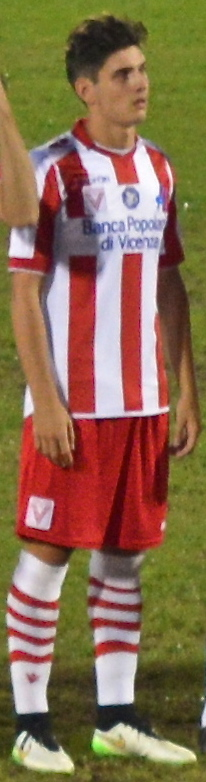
- Marco Pinato

Personal information
- Date of birth: 9 January 1995 (age 31)
- Place of birth: Monza, Italy
- Height: 1.75 m (5 ft 9 in)
- Position: Defender

Team information
- Current team: Gubbio
- Number: 11

Youth career
- 2012–2014: AC Milan

Senior career*
Years	Team	Apps	(Gls)
2014–2015	AC Milan	0	(0)
2014–2015	→ Lanciano (loan)	13	(1)
2015–2016	Vicenza	6	(0)
2016–2017	Latina	10	(0)
2017–2018	Venezia	36	(4)
2018–2022	Sassuolo	0	(0)
2018–2019	→ Venezia (loan)	22	(0)
2019–2020	→ Pisa (loan)	27	(2)
2020–2021	→ Cremonese (loan)	24	(2)
2021–2022	→ Pordenone (loan)	16	(1)
2022	→ SPAL (loan)	15	(1)
2022–2023	Pordenone	31	(7)
2023–2026	Benevento	38	(5)
2026–	Gubbio	0	(0)

International career
2012	Italy U17	2	(0)
2014	Italy U19	3	(0)
2014–2016	Italy U20	6	(0)
- * Club domestic league appearances and goals as of 22 August 2026

Marco Pinato (born 9 January 1995) is an Italian professional footballer who plays as a defender for Serie C Group B club Gubbio.

== Club career ==
On 20 August 2014 he was signed by Lanciano in a temporary deal. On 10 July 2015 he was signed by Vicenza. On 31 August 2016 he moved to Latina in a definitive deal.

On 5 July 2017 Pinato was signed by Venezia.

On 16 August 2018, Pianto signed to Serie A club Sassuolo on the condition that he remained at Venezia until the end of the season.

On 30 July 2019, Pinato joined Serie B side Pisa on loan until 30 June 2020.

On 3 September 2020 he moved to Cremonese on loan.

On 31 August 2021, he was loaned to Pordenone. On 31 January 2022, Pinato moved on a new loan to SPAL.

On 1 September 2022, Pinato returned to Pordenone on a permanent basis and signed a three-year contract.

On 17 August 2023, Pinato signed with Benevento.
