= Giacomo Manzari =

Italian footballer (born 2000)

Personal information
- Date of birth: 21 September 2000 (age 26)
- Place of birth: Bari, Italy
- Height: 1.78 m (5 ft 10 in)
- Position: Forward

Team information
- Current team: Bari
- Number: 10

Youth career
- 2008–2018: Bari
- 2018–2020: Sassuolo

Senior career*
Years	Team	Apps	(Gls)
2020–2024	Sassuolo	3	(0)
2020–2021	→ Carrarese (loan)	29	(3)
2021–2022	→ Frosinone (loan)	12	(0)
2022–2023	→ Monopoli (loan)	35	(8)
2023–2024	→ Ascoli (loan)	15	(1)
2024	→ Feralpisalò (loan)	10	(0)
2024–	Bari	12	(0)
2025	→ Carrarese (loan)	4	(0)
2025–2026	→ Perugia (loan)	25	(4)
- * Club domestic league appearances and goals as of 28 August 2026

Giacomo Manzari (born 21 September 2000) is an Italian footballer who plays as a forward for Serie C Group C club Bari.

== Club career ==
Manzari is a youth product of his local side Bari, and joined Sassuolo in 2018. Manzari senior debut with Sassuolo in a 1–1 Serie A tie with Cagliari on 18 July 2020.

On 24 September 2020, he joined Serie C club Carrarese on loan.

On 23 August 2021, he went to Serie B side Frosinone on a two-year loan. On 27 August 2022, Frosinone arranged his sub-loan to Monopoli, with the consent of Sassuolo.

On 19 July 2023, Manzari moved on a new loan to Ascoli. On 30 January 2024, Manzari joined Feralpisalò on loan with a conditional obligation to buy.

On 12 July 2024, Manzari returned to Bari on a three-season contract. On 3 February 2025, he was loaned by Carrarese.
