= 2017–18 US Sassuolo Calcio season =

Sassuolo
2017–18 season
- President: Carlo Rossi
- Manager: Cristian Bucchi (until 27 November 2017); Giuseppe Iachini (from 27 November 2017)
- Stadium: Mapei Stadium – Città del Tricolore
- Serie A: 11th
- Coppa Italia: Round of 16
- Top goalscorer: League: Matteo Politano (10); All: Matteo Politano (11)
- Highest home attendance: 21,584 vs Juventus (17 September 2017, Serie A)
- Lowest home attendance: 2,198 vs Bari (29 November 2017, Coppa Italia)
- Average home league attendance: 11,237
Home colours	Away colours	Third colours

The 2017–18 season was Unione Sportiva Sassuolo Calcio's fifth consecutive season in the top-flight of Italian football. The club competed in Serie A and the Coppa Italia following a 12th-place finish last season, finishing 11th and being eliminated in the round of 16 respectively.

On 13 June 2017 coach Eusebio Di Francesco was appointed as Roma manager; Cristian Bucchi was appointed to manage the club on 20 June.

== Players ==
=== Squad information ===
As of 1 September 2017

Note: Flags indicate national team as defined under FIFA eligibility rules; some limited exceptions apply. Players may hold more than one non-FIFA nationality.

No.	Pos.	Nation	Player
4	MF	ITA	Francesco Magnanelli (captain)
6	MF	ITA	Luca Mazzitelli
7	MF	ITA	Simone Missiroli
8	MF	ITA	Davide Biondini
10	FW	ITA	Alessandro Matri
11	FW	ITA	Diego Falcinelli
12	MF	ITA	Stefano Sensi
13	DF	ITA	Federico Peluso
14	FW	ITA	Gianluca Scamacca
15	DF	ITA	Francesco Acerbi
16	FW	ITA	Matteo Politano
17	FW	ITA	Nicholas Pierini
21	DF	ESP	Pol Lirola (on loan from Juventus)
22	MF	ITA	Davide Frattesi
23	DF	ITA	Marcello Gazzola

No.	Pos.	Nation	Player
24	DF	ITA	Edoardo Goldaniga
25	FW	ITA	Domenico Berardi
26	DF	BRA	Rogério (on loan from Juventus)
28	DF	ITA	Paolo Cannavaro
29	MF	ITA	Francesco Cassata
32	MF	GHA	Alfred Duncan
39	DF	ITA	Cristian Dell'Orco
47	GK	ITA	Andrea Consigli
55	DF	NED	Timo Letschert
70	GK	ITA	Leonardo Marson (on loan from Palermo)
76	GK	ITA	Giacomo Satalino
79	GK	ITA	Gianluca Pegolo
90	FW	ITA	Antonino Ragusa
98	DF	ITA	Claud Adjapong

== Transfers ==
=== In ===
Date	Pos.	Player	Age	Moving from	Fee	Notes	Source
30 June 2017	FW	(Italy) Federico Ricci	23	(Italy) Roma	Undisclosed		
9 July 2017	MF	(Italy) Filippo Bandinelli	22	Unattached	Free		
29 July 2017	DF	(Italy) Edoardo Goldaniga	23	(Italy) Palermo	€5M		

==== Loans in ====
Date	Pos.	Player	Age	Moving from	Fee	Notes	Source

=== Out ===
Date	Pos.	Player	Age	Moving to	Fee	Notes	Source
30 June 2017	MF	(Italy) Lorenzo Pellegrini	21	(Italy) Roma	€10M		
7 August 2017	GK	(Italy) Alberto Pomini	36	(Italy) Palermo	Undisclosed		

==== Loans out ====
Date	Pos.	Player	Age	Moving to	Fee	Notes	Source
20 July 2017	FW	(France) Grégoire Defrel	26	(Italy) Roma	€5M	€5M + €15M obligation to buy	
22 July 2017	FW	(Italy) Marcello Trotta	24	(Italy) Crotone	Loan	Second consecutive loan with Crotone	
4 August 2017	DF	(Italy) Gian Marco Ferrari	30	(Italy) Sampdoria	Loan	Loan with an option to buy	
31 August 2017	DF	(Italy) Luca Antei	25	(Italy) Benevento	Loan	Loan with an option to buy	
31 August 2017	FW	(Italy) Pietro Iemmello	25	(Italy) Benevento	Loan	Loan with an option to buy	
31 August 2017	FW	(Italy) Federico Ricci	23	(Italy) Genoa	Loan	Loan with an option to buy for €11M; counter-option for €14M	

== Competitions ==
=== Serie A ===
==== League table ====
Pos	Team	Pld	W	D	L	GF	GA	GD	Pts
9	Torino	38	13	15	10	54	46	+8	54
10	Sampdoria	38	16	6	16	56	60	−4	54
11	Sassuolo	38	11	10	17	29	59	−30	43
12	Genoa	38	11	8	19	33	43	−10	41
13	Chievo	38	10	10	18	36	59	−23	40 (Note: Chievo finished ahead of Udinese on head-to-head points: Chievo 1–1 Udinese, Udinese 1–2 Chievo.)

Source: Serie A, Soccerway
Rules for classification: 1) Points; 2) Head-to-head points; 3) Head-to-head goal difference; 4) Goal difference; 5) Goals scored; 6) Draw.

==== Results summary ====
Overall								Home						Away					
Pld	W	D	L	GF	GA	GD	Pts	W	D	L	GF	GA	GD	W	D	L	GF	GA	GD
38	11	10	17	29	59	−30	43	4	7	8	11	22	−11	7	3	9	18	37	−19

Last updated: 20 May 2018.
Source: Competitive matches

==== Results by round ====
Round	1	2	3	4	5	6	7	8	9	10	11	12	13	14	15	16	17	18	19	20	21	22	23	24	25	26	27	28	29	30	31	32	33	34	35	36	37	38
Ground	H	A	A	H	A	H	A	H	A	H	A	H	A	H	A	H	A	H	A	A	H	H	A	H	A	H	A	H	A	H	A	H	A	H	A	H	A	H
Result	D	L	L	L	W	L	L	D	W	L	L	L	W	L	L	W	W	W	D	L	D	L	L	D	L	L	D	D	W	D	D	D	W	W	L	W	W	L
Position	12	15	17	17	14	15	17	19	13	15	17	17	16	16	17	15	15	14	14	15	14	14	16	15	16	16	16	17	15	16	14	15	13	13	13	12	11	11

Updated to match(es) played on 20 May 2018. Source: Competitive matches
A = Away; H = Home; W = Win; D = Draw; L = Loss

==== Matches ====
20 August 2017 1	Sassuolo	0–0	Genoa	Reggio Emilia
20:45 CEST (UTC+02:00)	Magnanelli (yellow card) 55'; Politano (yellow card) 61'	Report	Veloso (yellow card) 26'; Rossettini (yellow card) 45+1'; Gentiletti (yellow card) 63'	Stadium: Mapei Stadium – Città del Tricolore; Attendance: 8,134; Referee: Antonio Damato

27 August 2017 2	Torino	3–0	Sassuolo	Turin
18:00 CEST (UTC+02:00)	Belotti 44'; Ljajić 84'; Obi 88', (yellow card) 90+1'	Report	Ragusa (yellow card) 80'	Stadium: Stadio Olimpico Grande Torino; Attendance: 18,289; Referee: Paolo Mazzoleni

10 September 2017 3	Atalanta	2–1	Sassuolo	Bergamo
15:00 CEST (UTC+02:00)	Cornelius 35'; Petagna 77'	Report	Sensi 27'; Magnanelli (yellow card) 53'	Stadium: Stadio Atleti Azzurri d'Italia; Attendance: 16,120; Referee: Fabrizio Pasqua

17 September 2017 4	Sassuolo	1–3	Juventus	Reggio Emilia
12:30 CEST (UTC+02:00)	Politano 51'; Adjapong (yellow card) 56'	Report	Dybala 16', 49', 63'; Alex Sandro (yellow card) 31'; Bernardeschi (yellow card) 86'	Stadium: Mapei Stadium – Città del Tricolore; Attendance: 21,584; Referee: Davide Massa

20 September 2017 5	Cagliari	0–1	Sassuolo	Cagliari
20:45 CEST (UTC+02:00)	Barella (yellow card) 17'; Ceppitelli (yellow card) 29'; Giannetti (yellow card) 90+3'	Report	Matri 60' (pen.); Magnanelli (yellow card) 71'; Cannavaro (yellow card) 83'; Lirola (yellow card) 84'	Stadium: Sardegna Arena; Attendance: 13,898; Referee: Claudio Gavillucci

24 September 2017 6	Sassuolo	0–1	Bologna	Reggio Emilia
18:00 CEST (UTC+02:00)	Adjapong (yellow card) 52'; Magnanelli (yellow card) 73' (yellow-red card) 80'	Report	Pulgar (yellow card) 83'; Poli (yellow card) 86'; Okwonkwo 89', (yellow card) 90'; Donsah (yellow card) 90+2'	Stadium: Mapei Stadium – Città del Tricolore; Attendance: 10,805; Referee: Paolo Tagliavento

1 October 2017 7	Lazio	6–1	Sassuolo	Rome
CEST (UTC+02:00)	De Vrij (yellow card) 26', (goal) 56'; Luis Alberto 45+1', 57'; Immobile (yellow card) 53', (goal) 81' (pen.); Parolo 64', 69'	Report	Berardi (yellow card) 24', (goal) 27' (pen.); Adjapong (yellow card) 32'; Sensi (yellow card) 45'	Stadium: Stadio Olimpico; Attendance: 25,000; Referee: Fabio Maresca

15 October 2017 8	Sassuolo	0–0	Chievo	Reggio Emilia
15:00 CEST (UTC+02:00)	Duncan (yellow card) 62'; Gazzola (yellow card) 65'	Report		Stadium: Mapei Stadium – Città del Tricolore; Attendance: 8,712; Referee: Gianluca Manganiello

22 October 2017 9	SPAL	0–1	Sassuolo	Ferrara
15:00 CEST (UTC+02:00)	Borriello (yellow card) 18'; Schiattarella (yellow card) 64'; Viviani (yellow card) 76'	Report	Politano 1'; Peluso (yellow card) 10'; Duncan (yellow card) 38'; Sensi (yellow card) 49'; Cassata (red card) 90'	Stadium: Stadio Paolo Mazza; Attendance: 10,338; Referee: Michael Fabbri

25 October 2017 10	Sassuolo	0–1	Udinese	Reggio Emilia
20:45 CEST (UTC+02:00)	Peluso (yellow card) 54'; Cannavaro (yellow card) 90+4'	Report	Barák 32'; Samir (yellow card) 45+2'; Jankto (yellow card) 69'; Stryger Larsen (yellow card) 74'	Stadium: Mapei Stadium – Città del Tricolore; Attendance: 7,563; Referee: Paolo Tagliavento

29 October 2017 11	Napoli	3–1	Sassuolo	Naples
15:00 CET (UTC+01:00)	Allan 22'; Callejón 44'; Mertens 54'; Zieliński (yellow card) 79'; Giaccherini (yellow card) 88'	Report	Ragusa (yellow card) 18'; Falcinelli 41'; Cassata (yellow card) 43'	Stadium: Stadio San Paolo; Attendance: 53,609; Referee: Luca Pairetto

5 November 2017 12	Sassuolo	0–2	Milan	Reggio Emilia
20:45 CET (UTC+01:00)	Acerbi (yellow card) 45+3'; Missiroli (yellow card) 89'	Report	Romagnoli 39', (yellow card) 45+3'; Bonucci (yellow card) 55'; Montolivo (yellow card) 64'; Suso 67'	Stadium: Mapei Stadium – Città del Tricolore; Attendance: 12,683; Referee: Antonio Damato

19 November 2017 13	Benevento	1–2	Sassuolo	Benevento
15:00 CET (UTC+01:00)	Letizia (yellow card) 25' (yellow-red card) 67'; Costa (yellow card) 43'; Armenteros 65', (yellow card) 66'	Report	Magnanelli (yellow card) 30'; Matri 57'; Peluso 90+4'	Stadium: Stadio Ciro Vigorito; Attendance: 10,312; Referee: Paolo Mazzoleni

25 November 2017 14	Sassuolo	0–2	Hellas Verona	Reggio Emilia
18:00 CET (UTC+01:00)		Report	Heurtaux (yellow card) 11' (yellow-red card) 67'; B. Zuculini 22'; Verde 31'; Fares (yellow card) 80'	Stadium: Mapei Stadium – Città del Tricolore; Attendance: 8,774; Referee: Paolo Valeri

3 December 2017 15	Fiorentina	3–0	Sassuolo	Florence
15:00 CET (UTC+01:00)	Simeone 32'; Benassi (yellow card) 39'; Veretout 42'; Chiesa 71'	Report	Berardi (yellow card) 56'; Magnanelli (yellow card) 72'; Cannavaro (yellow card) 80'	Stadium: Stadio Artemio Franchi; Attendance: 23,398; Referee: Luca Banti

10 December 2017 16	Sassuolo	2–1	Crotone	Reggio Emilia
18:00 CET (UTC+01:00)	Berardi (yellow card) 36'; Goldaniga 49'; Politano 61'; Missiroli (yellow card) 72'; Cassata (yellow card) 74'	Report	Ajeti (yellow card) 50'; Acerbi 66' (o.g.); Romero (yellow card) 90+3'	Stadium: Mapei Stadium – Città del Tricolore; Attendance: 8,319; Referee: Gianluca Manganiello

17 December 2017 17	Sampdoria	0–1	Sassuolo	Genoa
15:00 CET (UTC+01:00)	Ramírez (yellow card) 67'	Report	Falcinelli (yellow card) 38'; Lirola (yellow card) 49'; Berardi (yellow card) 72'; Goldaniga (yellow card) 84'; Matri 90'; Consigli (yellow card) 90+3'; Ragusa (yellow card) 90+6'	Stadium: Stadio Luigi Ferraris; Attendance: 17,563; Referee: Claudio Gavillucci

23 December 2017 18	Sassuolo	1–0	Internazionale	Reggio Emilia
15:00 CET (UTC+01:00)	Falcinelli 34', (yellow card) 73'	Report	Brozović (yellow card) 21'; Cancelo (yellow card) 74'	Stadium: Mapei Stadium – Città del Tricolore; Attendance: 18,767; Referee: Daniele Doveri

30 December 2017 19	Roma	1–1	Sassuolo	Rome
15:00 CET (UTC+01:00)	Pellegrini 31'; Džeko (yellow card) 58'	Report	Missiroli 78'; Magnanelli (yellow card) 90+1'; Falcinelli (yellow card) 90+4'	Stadium: Stadio Olimpico; Attendance: 37,157; Referee: Daniele Orsato

6 January 2018 20	Genoa	1–0	Sassuolo	Genoa
15:00 CET (UTC+01:00)	Rigoni (yellow card) 29'; Zukanović (yellow card) 70'; Galabinov (yellow card) 77', (goal) 80'	Report	Missiroli (yellow card) 68'	Stadium: Stadio Luigi Ferraris; Attendance: 18,639; Referee: Piero Giacomelli

21 January 2018 21	Sassuolo	1–1	Torino	Reggio Emilia
15:00 CET (UTC+01:00)	Duncan (yellow card) 39'; Berardi 54'; Acerbi (yellow card) 65'; Matri (yellow card) 70'; Goldaniga (yellow card) 90+2'	Report	Obi 26'; Rincón (yellow card) 48'; Baselli (yellow card) 81'	Stadium: Mapei Stadium – Città del Tricolore; Attendance: 10,402; Referee: Michael Fabbri

27 January 2018 22	Sassuolo	0–3	Atalanta	Reggio Emilia
18:00 CET (UTC+01:00)	Goldaniga (yellow card) 68' (yellow-red card) 90+7'	Report	Masiello 30'; Cristante 83'; Freuler 86'	Stadium: Mapei Stadium – Città del Tricolore; Attendance: 8,852; Referee: Paolo Valeri

4 February 2018 23	Juventus	7–0	Sassuolo	Turin
15:00 CET (UTC+01:00)	Alex Sandro 9'; Khedira 24', 27'; Pjanić 38'; Higuaín 63', 74', 83'	Report	Peluso (yellow card) 33'; Magnanelli (yellow card) 86'	Stadium: Allianz Stadium; Attendance: 40,400; Referee: Fabrizio Pasqua

11 February 2018 24	Sassuolo	0–0	Cagliari	Reggio Emilia
12:30 CET (UTC+01:00)		Report	Andreolli (yellow card) 56'	Stadium: Mapei Stadium – Città del Tricolore; Attendance: 9,149; Referee: Paolo Mazzoleni

18 February 2018 25	Bologna	2–1	Sassuolo	Bologna
15:00 CET (UTC+01:00)	Poli 12'; De Maio (yellow card) 37'; Pulgar 88'	Report	Peluso (yellow card) 29'; Babacar 38'; Goldaniga (yellow card) 60' (yellow-red card) 86'; Ragusa (yellow card) 90+3'	Stadium: Stadio Renato Dall'Ara; Attendance: 16,271; Referee: Paolo Tagliavento

25 February 2018 26	Sassuolo	0–3	Lazio	Reggio Emilia
15:00 CET (UTC+01:00)	Berardi (yellow card) 20' (red card) 54'; Missiroli (yellow card) 45+4'; Rogério (yellow card) 63'	Report	Milinković-Savić 7', 46'; Lucas (yellow card) 28'; Immobile 31' (pen.); Wallace (yellow card) 35'; Lukaku (yellow card) 45+1'; Marušić (red card) 62'	Stadium: Mapei Stadium – Città del Tricolore; Attendance: 8,582; Referee: Gianluca Manganiello

11 March 2018 28	Sassuolo	1–1	SPAL	Reggio Emilia
15:00 CET (UTC+01:00)	Ragusa (yellow card) 17'; Babacar 31' (pen.); Peluso (yellow card) 35'; Mazzitelli (yellow card) 89'	Report	Antenucci 27'; Cionek (yellow card) 38'; Lazzari (yellow card) 57'; Grassi (yellow card) 88'	Stadium: Mapei Stadium – Città del Tricolore; Attendance: 11,589; Referee: Daniele Doveri

18 March 2018 29	Udinese	1–2	Sassuolo	Udine
15:00 CET (UTC+01:00)	Fofana 44'; Barák (yellow card) 63'	Report	Adjapong (yellow card) 15'; Mazzitelli (yellow card) 29'; Ali Adnan 42' (o.g.); Sensi 74'	Stadium: Dacia Arena; Attendance: 14,970; Referee: Rosario Abisso

31 March 2018 30	Sassuolo	1–1	Napoli	Reggio Emilia
15:00 CEST (UTC+02:00)	Politano 22'; Peluso (yellow card) 35'; Berardi (yellow card) 44'; Goldaniga (yellow card) 59'; Cassata (yellow card) 86'; Ragusa (yellow card) 89'	Report	Albiol (yellow card) 31'; Jorginho (yellow card) 42'; Callejón 80'	Stadium: Mapei Stadium – Città del Tricolore; Attendance: 16,904; Referee: Michael Fabbri

4 April 2018 27	Chievo	1–1	Sassuolo	Verona
18:30 CEST (UTC+02:00)	Gobbi (yellow card) 42'; Giaccherini (yellow card) 45+2'; 72'; Hetemaj (yellow card) 48'; Cacciatore (yellow card) 90+4'	Report	Magnanelli (yellow card) 22' (yellow-red card) 84'; Adjapong (red card) 27'; Cassata 90+5'	Stadium: Stadio Marc'Antonio Bentegodi; Attendance: 8,000; Referee: Paolo Tagliavento
Note: Postponed due to Fiorentina player Davide Astori's death; originally scheduled for 4 March 2018.

8 April 2018 31	Milan	1–1	Sassuolo	Milan
20:45 CEST (UTC+02:00)	Kessié (yellow card) 22'; Musacchio (yellow card) 74'; Bonucci (yellow card) 81'; Kalinić 86'	Report	Rogério (yellow card) 29'; Mazzitelli (yellow card) 36'; Politano 75'	Stadium: San Siro; Attendance: 43,140; Referee: Luca Pairetto

15 April 2018 32	Sassuolo	2–2	Benevento	Reggio Emilia
15:00 CEST (UTC+02:00)	Peluso (yellow card) 3'; Acerbi (yellow card) 23'; Politano 41', 64'; Magnanelli (yellow card) 45+6'	Report	Diabaté 22', 72'; Cataldi (yellow card) 46'; Sandro (yellow card) 71'	Stadium: Mapei Stadium – Città del Tricolore; Attendance: 8,880; Referee: Claudio Gavillucci

18 April 2018 33	Hellas Verona	0–1	Sassuolo	Verona
20:45 CEST (UTC+02:00)	Ferrari (yellow card) 23'; Vuković (yellow card) 69'; Lee Seung-woo (yellow card) 90+4'	Report	Rogério (yellow card) 31'; Lemos 38'; Mazzitelli (yellow card) 61'; Duncan (yellow card) 71'; Peluso (yellow card) 75'	Stadium: Stadio Marc'Antonio Bentegodi; Attendance: 13,996; Referee: Marco Guida

21 April 2018 34	Sassuolo	1–0	Fiorentina	Reggio Emilia
18:00 CEST (UTC+02:00)	Peluso (yellow card) 34'; Politano 41'; Berardi (yellow card) 43'; Lemos (yellow card) 47'; Adjapong (yellow card) 72'; Rogério (yellow card) 87'; Consigli (yellow card) 90+3'	Report	Dabo (yellow card) 6' (yellow-red card) 30'; Laurini (yellow card) 42'; Benassi (yellow card) 90'	Stadium: Mapei Stadium – Città del Tricolore; Attendance: 10,739; Referee: Massimiliano Irrati

29 April 2018 35	Crotone	4–1	Sassuolo	Crotone
12:30 CEST (UTC+02:00)	Trotta 3', 31', (yellow card) 81'; Simy 16', 89'; Mandragora (yellow card) 44'; Ajeti (yellow card) 85'	Report	Berardi 45+2' (pen.); Lemos (yellow card) 80'	Stadium: Stadio Ezio Scida; Attendance: 13,600; Referee: Antonio Damato

6 May 2018 36	Sassuolo	1–0	Sampdoria	Reggio Emilia
18:00 CEST (UTC+02:00)	Peluso (yellow card) 54'; Politano 68'	Report	Ramírez (yellow card) 90'	Stadium: Mapei Stadium – Città del Tricolore; Attendance: 10,483; Referee: Federico La Penna

12 May 2018 37	Internazionale	1–2	Sassuolo	Milan
20:45 CEST (UTC+02:00)	Brozović (yellow card) 23'; Rafinha 80'	Report	Berardi (yellow card) 17', (goal) 72'; Politano 25'; Acerbi (yellow card) 85'	Stadium: San Siro; Attendance: 66,876; Referee: Rosario Abisso

20 May 2018 38	Sassuolo	0–1	Roma	Reggio Emilia
20:45 CEST (UTC+02:00)	Biondini (yellow card) 90+1'	Report	Fazio (yellow card) 35'; Pegolo 45+1' (o.g.)	Stadium: Mapei Stadium – Città del Tricolore; Attendance: 13,129; Referee: Eugenio Abbattista

=== Coppa Italia ===
12 August 2017 Third round	Sassuolo	2–0	Spezia	Reggio Emilia
20:45 CEST (UTC+02:00)	Missiroli 8'; Berardi 27'	Report	Terzi (yellow card) 57'; Sciaudone (yellow card) 70'; Giani (yellow card) 77'; Vignali (yellow card) 90'	Stadium: Mapei Stadium – Città del Tricolore; Attendance: 9,184; Referee: Luca Pairetto

29 November 2017 Fourth round	Sassuolo	2–1	Bari	Reggio Emilia
15:00 CET (UTC+01:00)	Falcinelli 34'; Mazzitelli (yellow card) 39'; Peluso (yellow card) 72'; Cassata (yellow card) 78'; Politano 90+3'	Report	Nenê 64' (pen.); Greco (yellow card) 90+1'	Stadium: Mapei Stadium – Città del Tricolore; Attendance: 2,198; Referee: Luigi Pillitteri

20 December 2017 Round of 16	Atalanta	2–1	Sassuolo	Bergamo
15:00 CET (UTC+01:00)	Cornelius 16'; Toloi 33'; Kurtić (yellow card) 61' (red card) 89'	Report	Cassata (yellow card) 25'; Rogério (yellow card) 73'; Toloi 74' (o.g.)	Stadium: Stadio Atleti Azzurri d'Italia; Attendance: 3,867; Referee: Davide Ghersini

== Statistics ==
=== Appearances and goals ===
No.	Pos	Nat	Player	Total		Serie A		Coppa Italia	
No.	Pos	Nat	Player	Apps	Goals	Apps	Goals	Apps	Goals
Goalkeepers
47	GK	(Italy) ITA	Andrea Consigli	38	0	37	0	1	0
70	GK	(Italy) ITA	Leonardo Marson	0	0	0	0	0	0
76	GK	(Italy) ITA	Giacomo Satalino	0	0	0	0	0	0
79	GK	(Italy) ITA	Gianluca Pegolo	4	0	1+1	0	2	0
Defenders
5	DF	(Uruguay) URU	Mauricio Lemos	8	1	8	1	0	0
13	DF	(Italy) ITA	Federico Peluso	33	1	28+3	1	2	0
15	DF	(Italy) ITA	Francesco Acerbi	41	0	38	0	3	0
21	DF	(Spain) ESP	Pol Lirola	26	0	22+2	0	2	0
24	DF	(Italy) ITA	Edoardo Goldaniga	14	1	13	1	1	0
26	DF	(Brazil) BRA	Rogério	14	0	10+3	0	1	0
39	DF	(Italy) ITA	Cristian Dell'Orco	8	0	5+3	0	0	0
55	DF	(Netherlands) NED	Timo Letschert	7	0	5+2	0	0	0
98	DF	(Italy) ITA	Claud Adjapong	16	0	14+2	0	0	0
Midfielders
4	MF	(Italy) ITA	Francesco Magnanelli	34	0	30+2	0	1+1	0
6	MF	(Italy) ITA	Luca Mazzitelli	23	0	10+10	0	2+1	0
7	MF	(Italy) ITA	Simone Missiroli	37	2	33+2	1	1+1	1
8	MF	(Italy) ITA	Davide Biondini	8	0	2+5	0	0+1	0
12	MF	(Italy) ITA	Stefano Sensi	19	2	10+7	2	2	0
22	MF	(Italy) ITA	Davide Frattesi	1	0	0	0	1	0
29	MF	(Italy) ITA	Francesco Cassata	12	1	5+5	1	2	0
32	MF	(Ghana) GHA	Alfred Duncan	26	0	23+3	0	0	0
Forwards
10	FW	(Italy) ITA	Alessandro Matri	25	3	7+16	3	1+1	0
16	FW	(Italy) ITA	Matteo Politano	39	11	33+3	10	2+1	1
17	FW	(Italy) ITA	Nicholas Pierini	4	0	0+3	0	1	0
25	FW	(Italy) ITA	Domenico Berardi	33	5	29+2	4	1+1	1
30	FW	(Senegal) SEN	Khouma Babacar	13	2	8+5	2	0	0
90	FW	(Italy) ITA	Antonino Ragusa	32	0	7+23	0	2	0
Players transferred out during the season
11	FW	(Italy) ITA	Diego Falcinelli	23	3	15+5	2	2+1	1
14	FW	(Italy) ITA	Gianluca Scamacca	3	0	0+3	0	0	0
23	DF	(Italy) ITA	Marcello Gazzola	10	0	9	0	1	0
28	DF	(Italy) ITA	Paolo Cannavaro	21	0	16+3	0	2	0

Last updated: 20 May 2018
Source: Competitions

=== Goalscorers ===
Rank	No.	Pos	Nat	Name	Serie A	Coppa Italia	Total
1	16	FW	(Italy)	Matteo Politano	10	1	11
2	25	FW	(Italy)	Domenico Berardi	4	1	5
3	10	FW	(Italy)	Alessandro Matri	3	0	3
3	11	FW	(Italy)	Diego Falcinelli	2	1	3
5	7	MF	(Italy)	Simone Missiroli	1	1	2
5	12	MF	(Italy)	Stefano Sensi	2	0	2
5	30	FW	(Senegal)	Khouma Babacar	2	0	2
8	5	DF	(Uruguay)	Mauricio Lemos	1	0	1
8	13	DF	(Italy)	Federico Peluso	1	0	1
8	24	DF	(Italy)	Edoardo Goldaniga	1	0	1
8	29	MF	(Italy)	Francesco Cassata	1	0	1
Own goal					1	1	2
Totals					29	5	34

Last updated: 20 May 2018

=== Clean sheets ===
Rank	No.	Pos	Nat	Name	Serie A	Coppa Italia	Total
1	47	GK	(Italy)	Andrea Consigli	10	1	11
Totals					10	1	11

Last updated: 20 May 2018

=== Disciplinary record ===
No.	Pos	Nat	Name	Serie A			Coppa Italia			Total		
No.	Pos	Nat	Name	Booked	(yellow card) (yellow-red card)	Sent off (straight red)	Booked	(yellow card) (yellow-red card)	Sent off (straight red)	Booked	(yellow card) (yellow-red card)	Sent off (straight red)
47	GK	(Italy)	Andrea Consigli	2	0	0	0	0	0	2	0	0
5	DF	(Uruguay)	Mauricio Lemos	2	0	0	0	0	0	2	0	0
13	DF	(Italy)	Federico Peluso	10	0	0	1	0	0	11	0	0
15	DF	(Italy)	Francesco Acerbi	4	0	0	0	0	0	4	0	0
21	DF	(Spain)	Pol Lirola	2	0	0	0	0	0	2	0	0
23	DF	(Italy)	Marcello Gazzola	1	0	0	0	0	0	1	0	0
24	DF	(Italy)	Edoardo Goldaniga	3	2	0	0	0	0	3	2	0
26	DF	(Brazil)	Rogério	4	0	0	1	0	0	5	0	0
28	DF	(Italy)	Paolo Cannavaro	3	0	0	0	0	0	3	0	0
98	DF	(Italy)	Claud Adjapong	5	0	1	0	0	0	5	0	1
4	MF	(Italy)	Francesco Magnanelli	9	2	0	0	0	0	9	2	0
6	MF	(Italy)	Luca Mazzitelli	4	0	0	1	0	0	5	0	0
7	MF	(Italy)	Simone Missiroli	4	0	0	0	0	0	4	0	0
8	MF	(Italy)	Davide Biondini	1	0	0	0	0	0	1	0	0
12	MF	(Italy)	Stefano Sensi	2	0	0	0	0	0	2	0	0
29	MF	(Italy)	Francesco Cassata	3	0	1	2	0	0	5	0	1
32	MF	(Ghana)	Alfred Duncan	4	0	0	0	0	0	4	0	0
10	FW	(Italy)	Alessandro Matri	1	0	0	0	0	0	1	0	0
11	FW	(Italy)	Diego Falcinelli	2	0	0	0	0	0	2	0	0
16	FW	(Italy)	Matteo Politano	1	0	0	0	0	0	1	0	0
25	FW	(Italy)	Domenico Berardi	8	0	1	0	0	0	8	0	1
90	FW	(Italy)	Antonino Ragusa	6	0	0	0	0	0	6	0	0
Totals				81	4	3	5	0	0	86	4	3

Last updated: 20 May 2018
