= 2018–19 US Sassuolo Calcio season =

Sassuolo
2018–19 season
- President: Carlo Rossi
- Manager: Roberto De Zerbi
- Stadium: Mapei Stadium – Città del Tricolore
- Serie A: 11th
- Coppa Italia: Round of 16
- Top goalscorer: League: Domenico Berardi (8); All: Domenico Berardi (10)
- Highest home attendance: 23,717 vs Internazionale (19 August 2018, Serie A)
- Lowest home attendance: 1,098 vs Catania (5 December 2018, Coppa Italia)
- Average home league attendance: 12,619
Home colours	Away colours	Third colours

The 2018–19 season was Unione Sportiva Sassuolo Calcio's sixth consecutive season in the top-flight of Italian football. The club competed in Serie A and the Coppa Italia.

Coach Giuseppe Iachini left the club on 5 June; he was replaced by former Palermo and Benevento coach Roberto De Zerbi on 13 June.

== Players ==
=== Squad information ===
As of 26 May 2019
Appearances include league matches only

No.	Name	Nat	Position(s)	Date of birth (age)	Signed from	Signed in	Contract ends	Apps.	Goals	Notes
Goalkeepers
28	Giacomo Satalino	(Italy)	GK	20 May 1999 (aged 20)	(Italy) Youth Sector	2018	2021	0	0	
47	Andrea Consigli	(Italy)	GK	27 January 1987 (aged 32)	(Italy) Atalanta	2014	2022	182	0	
79	Gianluca Pegolo	(Italy)	GK	25 March 1981 (aged 38)	(Italy) Siena	2013	2019	41	0	
Defenders
2	Marlon	(Brazil)	CB	7 September 1995 (aged 23)	(Spain) Barcelona	2018	2020	18	1	
3	Merih Demiral	(Turkey)	CB / RB	5 March 1998 (aged 21)	(Portugal) Sporting CP B	2019	2019	14	2	Loan
5	Mauricio Lemos	(Uruguay)	CB	28 December 1995 (aged 23)	(Spain) Las Palmas	2018	2019	11	1	Loan
6	Rogério	(Brazil)	LB	13 January 1998 (aged 21)	(Italy) Juventus	2017	2019	46	1	Loan
13	Federico Peluso	(Italy)	LB / CB	20 January 1984 (aged 35)	(Italy) Juventus	2014	2020	143	4	
17	Leonardo Sernicola	(Italy)	LB	30 July 1997 (aged 21)	(Italy) Ternana	2018	2023	1	0	
21	Pol Lirola	(Spain)	RB	13 August 1997 (aged 21)	(Italy) Juventus	2016	2021	81	2	
23	Giangiacomo Magnani	(Italy)	CB	4 October 1995 (aged 23)	(Italy) Juventus	2018	2023	19	0	
31	Gian Marco Ferrari	(Italy)	CB	15 February 1992 (aged 27)	(Italy) Crotone	2016	2021	31	4	
98	Claud Adjapong	(Italy)	RB	6 May 1998 (aged 21)	(Italy) Youth Sector	2016	2023	32	2	
Midfielders
4	Francesco Magnanelli	(Italy)	DM	12 November 1984 (aged 34)	(Italy) Sangiovannese	2005	2019	404	8	Captain
9	Filip Đuričić	(Serbia)	AM	30 January 1992 (aged 27)	(Italy) Sampdoria	2018	2022	23	2	
12	Stefano Sensi	(Italy)	DM / CM	5 August 1995 (aged 23)	(Italy) Cesena	2016	2020	61	5	
20	Jérémie Boga	(Ivory Coast)	AM / LW	3 January 1997 (aged 22)	(England) Chelsea	2018	2022	25	3	
32	Alfred Duncan	(Ghana)	CM	10 March 1993 (aged 26)	(Italy) Sampdoria	2015	2020	106	6	
68	Mehdi Bourabia	(Morocco)	CM / AM	7 August 1991 (aged 27)	(Turkey) Konyaspor	2018	2022	32	1	
73	Manuel Locatelli	(Italy)	DM / CM	8 January 1998 (aged 21)	(Italy) Milan	2018	2019	29	2	Loan
Forwards
10	Alessandro Matri	(Italy)	ST	19 August 1984 (aged 34)	(Italy) Milan	2016	2019	73	13	
11	Gianluca Scamacca	(Italy)	ST	1 January 1999 (aged 20)	(Italy) Youth Sector	2017	2020	3	0	
18	Giacomo Raspadori	(Italy)	ST	18 February 2000 (aged 19)	(Italy) Youth Sector	2018	2022	1	0	
19	Jens Odgaard	(Denmark)	ST	31 March 1999 (aged 20)	(Italy) Internazionale	2018	2023	1	0	
25	Domenico Berardi	(Italy)	RW / LW / SS	1 August 1994 (aged 24)	(Italy) Youth Sector	2012	2022	214	66	
30	Khouma Babacar	(Senegal)	ST	17 March 1993 (aged 26)	(Italy) Fiorentina	2018	2022	42	9	
34	Federico Di Francesco	(Italy)	LW / RW / AM	14 June 1994 (aged 25)	(Italy) Bologna	2018	2023	19	2	
99	Enrico Brignola	(Italy)	RW / SS	8 July 1999 (aged 19)	(Italy) Benevento	2018	2023	7	1	
Players transferred during the season
27	Kevin-Prince Boateng	(Ghana)	AM / CM / SS	6 March 1987 (aged 32)	(Germany) Eintracht Frankfurt	2018	2021	13	4	
29	Marcello Trotta	(Italy)	ST	29 September 1992 (aged 26)	(Italy) Avellino	2016	2020	8	1	
39	Cristian Dell'Orco	(Italy)	LB	10 February 1994 (aged 25)	(Italy) Parma	2015	2020	20	0	

== Transfers ==
=== In ===
Date	Pos.	Player	Age	Moving from	Fee	Notes	Source
22 June 2018	MF	(Serbia) Filip Đuričić	26	(Italy) Sampdoria	Free		
29 June 2018	FW	(Denmark) Jens Odgaard	24	(Italy) Internazionale	€5M	Buyback option included for €5M in 2019 or €10M in 2020	
1 July 2018	DF	(Italy) Gian Marco Ferrari	26	(Italy) Sampdoria	Loan return		
1 July 2018	FW	(Italy) Marcello Trotta	25	(Italy) Crotone	Loan return		
4 July 2018	FW	(Italy) Federico Di Francesco	24	(Italy) Bologna	N/A	Part of swap deal for Diego Falcinelli	
5 July 2018	MF	(Ghana) Kevin-Prince Boateng	31	(Germany) Eintracht Frankfurt	Undisclosed		
21 July 2018	MF	(Ivory Coast) Jérémie Boga	21	(England) Chelsea	£3.6M		
2 August 2018	FW	(Italy) Enrico Brignola	19	(Italy) Benevento	€3.5M		

==== Loans in ====
Date	Pos.	Player	Age	Moving from	Fee	Notes	Source
29 June 2018	DF	(Uruguay) Mauricio Lemos	22	(Spain) Las Palmas	Loan	Second consecutive loan	

=== Out ===
Date	Pos.	Player	Age	Moving to	Fee	Notes	Source
4 July 2018	FW	(Italy) Diego Falcinelli	27	(Italy) Bologna	N/A	Part of swap deal for Federico Di Francesco	
11 July 2018	DF	(Italy) Francesco Acerbi	30	(Italy) Lazio	€10M	€10M + €2M in bonuses	
17 August 2018	MF	(Italy) Simone Missiroli	32	(Italy) SPAL	Undisclosed		

==== Loans out ====
Date	Pos.	Player	Age	Moving to	Fee	Notes	Source
30 June 2018	FW	(Italy) Matteo Politano	24	(Italy) Internazionale	€5M	Loan with an option to buy for €20M	
6 July 2018	MF	(Italy) Luca Mazzitelli	22	(Italy) Genoa	Loan	Loan with compulsory purchase option	
15 July 2018	DF	(Italy) Edoardo Goldaniga	24	(Italy) Frosinone	Loan		

== Competitions ==
=== Serie A ===
==== League table ====
Pos	Team	Pld	W	D	L	GF	GA	GD	Pts
9	Sampdoria	38	15	8	15	60	51	+9	53
10	Bologna	38	11	11	16	48	56	−8	44
11	Sassuolo	38	9	16	13	53	60	−7	43
12	Udinese	38	11	10	17	39	53	−14	43
13	SPAL	38	11	9	18	44	56	−12	42

Source: Serie A, Soccerway
Rules for classification: 1) Points; 2) Head-to-head points; 3) Head-to-head goal difference; 4) Goal difference; 5) Goals scored; 6) Draw. (Note: Head-to-head record is used only after all the matches between the teams in question have been played).

==== Results summary ====
Overall								Home						Away					
Pld	W	D	L	GF	GA	GD	Pts	W	D	L	GF	GA	GD	W	D	L	GF	GA	GD
38	9	16	13	53	60	−7	43	5	10	4	33	33	0	4	6	9	20	27	−7

Last updated: 26 May 2019.
Source: Competitive matches

==== Results by round ====
Round	1	2	3	4	5	6	7	8	9	10	11	12	13	14	15	16	17	18	19	20	21	22	23	24	25	26	27	28	29	30	31	32	33	34	35	36	37	38
Ground	H	A	H	A	H	A	H	A	A	H	A	H	A	H	H	A	H	A	H	A	H	A	H	A	H	A	H	H	A	H	A	H	A	A	H	A	H	A
Result	W	D	W	L	W	W	L	L	D	D	W	D	L	D	D	W	D	L	L	D	W	D	L	L	D	L	D	L	L	W	D	D	D	W	D	L	D	L
Position	6	6	2	6	4	3	4	8	8	9	6	7	8	8	9	8	8	11	11	12	11	11	11	11	11	11	11	13	14	11	11	11	12	10	10	10	10	11

Updated to match(es) played on 26 May 2019. Source: Competitive matches
A = Away; H = Home; W = Win; D = Draw; L = Loss

==== Matches ====
19 August 2018 1	Sassuolo	1–0	Internazionale	Reggio Emilia
20:30 CEST (UTC+02:00)	Duncan (yellow card) 6'; Rogério (yellow card) 16'; Berardi 27' (pen.); Sensi (yellow card) 90'	Report	Miranda (yellow card) 26'; Vecino (yellow card) 54'	Stadium: Mapei Stadium – Città del Tricolore; Attendance: 23,717; Referee: Maurizio Mariani

26 August 2018 2	Cagliari	2–2	Sassuolo	Cagliari
20:30 CEST (UTC+02:00)	Pavoletti 10', 73'; Barella (yellow card) 34'; Cigarini (yellow card) 61'; Ioniță (yellow card) 69'; Romagna (yellow card) 90+9'	Report	Locatelli (yellow card) 33'; Berardi 53'; Marlon (yellow card) 63' (yellow-red card) 90+2'; Boateng (yellow card) 74', (goal) 90+9' (pen.)	Stadium: Sardegna Arena; Attendance: 14,432; Referee: Luca Pairetto

2 September 2018 3	Sassuolo	5–3	Genoa	Reggio Emilia
20:30 CEST (UTC+02:00)	Rogério (yellow card) 31'; Magnani (yellow card) 33'; Boateng 34'; Lirola 38'; Babacar 41'; Spolli 45+2' (o.g.); Ferrari 62'; Duncan (yellow card) 90+2'	Report	Piątek 27', 83', (yellow card) 29'; Criscito (yellow card) 52'; Pandev 70'; Bessa (yellow card) 90+1'	Stadium: Mapei Stadium – Città del Tricolore; Attendance: 9,740; Referee: Gianluca Rocchi

16 September 2018 4	Juventus	2–1	Sassuolo	Turin
15:00 CEST (UTC+02:00)	Cancelo (yellow card) 32'; Ronaldo 50', 65'; Alex Sandro (yellow card) 60'; Douglas Costa (yellow card) 90+1' (red card) 90+4'	Report	Đuričić (yellow card) 23'; Berardi (yellow card) 26'; Bourabia (yellow card) 40'; Babacar 90+1'	Stadium: Allianz Stadium; Attendance: 40,563; Referee: Daniele Chiffi

21 September 2018 5	Sassuolo	3–1	Empoli	Reggio Emilia
20:30 CEST (UTC+02:00)	Boateng 13'; Di Francesco (yellow card) 31', (goal) 85'; Ferrari 57'	Report	Caputo 1'; Capezzi (yellow card) 6'; Krunić (yellow card) 11'; Zajc (yellow card) 45+1' (yellow-red card) 71'	Stadium: Mapei Stadium – Città del Tricolore; Attendance: 10,183; Referee: Federico La Penna

27 September 2018 6	SPAL	0–2	Sassuolo	Ferrara
19:00 CEST (UTC+02:00)	Kurtić (yellow card) 66'	Report	Adjapong 59'; Matri 90'	Stadium: Stadio Paolo Mazza; Attendance: 13,945; Referee: Eugenio Abbattista

30 September 2018 7	Sassuolo	1–4	Milan	Reggio Emilia
20:30 CEST (UTC+02:00)	Đuričić 68'; Rogério (yellow card) 70'	Report	Biglia (yellow card) 17'; Kessié 39'; Suso 50', 90+4'; Castillejo 60'	Stadium: Mapei Stadium – Città del Tricolore; Attendance: 16,795; Referee: Piero Giacomelli

7 October 2018 8	Napoli	2–0	Sassuolo	Naples
18:00 CEST (UTC+02:00)	Ounas 3'; Diawara (yellow card) 42'; Insigne 72'; Koulibaly (yellow card) 82'	Report	Locatelli (yellow card) 38'; Rogério (red card) 87'; Consigli (yellow card) 90'	Stadium: Stadio San Paolo; Attendance: 29,647; Referee: Marco Di Bello

22 October 2018 9	Sampdoria	0–0	Sassuolo	Genoa
20:30 CEST (UTC+02:00)	Andersen (yellow card) 20'; Barreto (yellow card) 54'	Report	Marlon (yellow card) 5'; Di Francesco (yellow card) 32'; Berardi (yellow card) 62'	Stadium: Stadio Luigi Ferraris; Attendance: 19,064; Referee: Francesco Fourneau

28 October 2018 10	Sassuolo	2–2	Bologna	Reggio Emilia
12:30 CET (UTC+01:00)	Marlon 17'; Ferrari (yellow card) 28'; Magnanelli (yellow card) 38'; Boateng 85' (pen.)	Report	Palacio 2', (yellow card) 49'; Poli (yellow card) 19'; Svanberg (yellow card) 41'; Mbaye 56'	Stadium: Mapei Stadium – Città del Tricolore; Attendance: 12,647; Referee: Daniele Doveri

4 November 2018 11	Chievo	0–2	Sassuolo	Verona
15:00 CET (UTC+01:00)	Obi (yellow card) 14'; Kiyine (yellow card) 35'; Depaoli (yellow card) 65'; Tanasijević (yellow card) 85' (yellow-red card) 88'	Report	Ferrari (yellow card) 20'; Berardi (yellow card) 37'; Di Francesco 42'; Giaccherini 90+4' (o.g.)	Stadium: Stadio Marc'Antonio Bentegodi; Attendance: 11,000; Referee: Gianluca Aureliano

11 November 2018 12	Sassuolo	1–1	Lazio	Reggio Emilia
18:00 CET (UTC+01:00)	Ferrari 15'; Duncan (yellow card) 23'; Adjapong (yellow card) 51'; Marlon (yellow card) 71'; Locatelli (yellow card) 76'	Report	Parolo 8'; Radu (yellow card) 28'; Luis Alberto (yellow card) 41'; Luiz Felipe (yellow card) 54'	Stadium: Mapei Stadium – Città del Tricolore; Attendance: 11,317; Referee: Gianpaolo Calvarese

25 November 2018 13	Parma	2–1	Sassuolo	Parma
12:30 CET (UTC+01:00)	Gervinho 6'; Inglese (yellow card) 20'; Alves 25', (yellow card) 36'; Bastoni (yellow card) 39'	Report	Babacar 36' (pen.); Duncan (yellow card) 62'; Marlon (yellow card) 82'; Ferrari (yellow card) 88'; Consigli (yellow card) 90+2'	Stadium: Stadio Ennio Tardini; Attendance: 14,354; Referee: Paolo Valeri

2 December 2018 14	Sassuolo	0–0	Udinese	Reggio Emilia
15:00 CET (UTC+01:00)	Ferrari (yellow card) 4'; Lirola (yellow card) 79'; Matri (yellow card) 87'	Report	De Paul (yellow card) 33'; Pezzella (yellow card) 51'	Stadium: Mapei Stadium – Città del Tricolore; Attendance: 10,655; Referee: Marco Guida

9 December 2018 15	Sassuolo	3–3	Fiorentina	Reggio Emilia
12:30 CET (UTC+01:00)	Sensi (yellow card) 47', (goal) 80'; Duncan 62'; Babacar 67'; Berardi (yellow card) 71'; Đuričić (yellow card) 86', (red card) 87'; Matri (yellow card) 90+2'	Report	Fernandes (yellow card) 23'; Milenković (yellow card) 25' (yellow-red card) 90+2'; Benassi (yellow card) 65', (goal) 89'; Simeone 70'; Veretout (yellow card) 90+1'; Mirallas 90+6'	Stadium: Mapei Stadium – Città del Tricolore; Attendance: 11,436; Referee: Daniele Chiffi

16 December 2018 16	Frosinone	0–2	Sassuolo	Frosinone
15:00 CET (UTC+01:00)	Chibash (yellow card) 23'; Ciano (yellow card) 57'; Soddimo (yellow card) 90+4'	Report	Rogério (yellow card) 34'; Ariaudo 44' (o.g.); Sensi (yellow card) 47'; Berardi 58'	Stadium: Stadio Benito Stirpe; Attendance: 12,377; Referee: Eugenio Abbattista

22 December 2018 17	Sassuolo	1–1	Torino	Reggio Emilia
15:00 CET (UTC+01:00)	Rogério (yellow card) 63'; Brignola 90+2', (yellow card) 90+8'	Report	Rincón (yellow card) 45'; Belotti 55'; Izzo (yellow card) 76'; Lukić (yellow card) 90'	Stadium: Mapei Stadium – Città del Tricolore; Attendance: 11,148; Referee: Luca Banti

26 December 2018 18	Roma	3–1	Sassuolo	Rome
18:00 CET (UTC+01:00)	Perotti 8' (pen.); Schick 23'; Florenzi (yellow card) 27'; Zaniolo 59'	Report	Ferrari (yellow card) 8'; Babacar 90'	Stadium: Stadio Olimpico; Attendance: 35,893; Referee: Piero Giacomelli

29 December 2018 19	Sassuolo	2–6	Atalanta	Reggio Emilia
15:00 CET (UTC+01:00)	Duncan 51', 58'; Sensi (yellow card) 70'	Report	Castagne (yellow card) 16'; Zapata 19', (yellow card) 81'; Gómez 42'; Mancini 54'; Iličić 74', 87', 90+2'	Stadium: Mapei Stadium – Città del Tricolore; Attendance: 12,233; Referee: Fabrizio Pasqua

19 January 2019 20	Internazionale	0–0	Sassuolo	Milan
20:30 CET (UTC+01:00)	Brozović (yellow card) 50'	Report	Sensi (yellow card) 32'; Rogério (yellow card) 51'; Peluso (yellow card) 90+3'	Stadium: San Siro; Attendance: 11,000; Referee: Luca Pairetto

26 January 2019 21	Sassuolo	3–0	Cagliari	Reggio Emilia
15:00 CET (UTC+01:00)	Locatelli 9'; Peluso (yellow card) 25'; Babacar 45+4' (pen.); Matri 87'	Report	Barella (yellow card) 14'	Stadium: Mapei Stadium – Città del Tricolore; Attendance: 9,970; Referee: Massimiliano Irrati

3 February 2019 22	Genoa	1–1	Sassuolo	Genoa
15:00 CET (UTC+01:00)	Sanabria 41'; Romero (yellow card) 54'	Report	Đuričić 28'; Duncan (yellow card) 44'; Bourabia (yellow card) 64'; Rogério (yellow card) 88'	Stadium: Stadio Luigi Ferraris; Attendance: 18,927; Referee: Gianluca Manganiello

10 February 2019 23	Sassuolo	0–3	Juventus	Reggio Emilia
18:00 CET (UTC+01:00)	Magnani (yellow card) 30'; Bourabia (yellow card) 38'; Lirola (yellow card) 90+4'	Report	Pjanić (yellow card) 6'; Khedira 23'; Alex Sandro (yellow card) 27'; Ronaldo 70'; Can 86'	Stadium: Mapei Stadium – Città del Tricolore; Attendance: 21,584; Referee: Paolo Mazzoleni

17 February 2019 24	Empoli	3–0	Sassuolo	Empoli
15:00 CET (UTC+01:00)	Krunić 34'; Acquah 37'; Farias 60'; Pasqual (yellow card) 71'	Report	Sensi (yellow card) 57'; Berardi (yellow card) 65'; Bourabia (yellow card) 84'	Stadium: Stadio Carlo Castellani; Attendance: 7,192; Referee: Maurizio Mariani

24 February 2019 25	Sassuolo	1–1	SPAL	Reggio Emilia
15:00 CET (UTC+01:00)	Peluso 43', (yellow card) 58'; Magnanelli (yellow card) 67'; Duncan (yellow card) 89', (red card) 90+3'; Rogério (yellow card) 90+1'	Report	Valoti (yellow card) 26'; Petagna 68' (pen.)	Stadium: Mapei Stadium – Città del Tricolore; Attendance: 11,554; Referee: Fabio Maresca

2 March 2019 26	Milan	1–0	Sassuolo	Milan
18:00 CET (UTC+01:00)	Lirola 35' (o.g.); Bakayoko (yellow card) 37'; Paquetá (yellow card) 51'; Rodríguez (yellow card) 90+2'	Report	Consigli (red card) 64'	Stadium: San Siro; Attendance: 61,642; Referee: Paolo Valeri

10 March 2019 27	Sassuolo	1–1	Napoli	Reggio Emilia
18:00 CET (UTC+01:00)	Berardi 52'; Ferrari (yellow card) 61'; Pegolo (yellow card) 68'; Bourabia (yellow card) 87'	Report	Allan (yellow card) 68'; Diawara (yellow card) 80'; Insigne 86'	Stadium: Mapei Stadium – Città del Tricolore; Attendance: 14,969; Referee: Gianluca Manganiello

16 March 2019 28	Sassuolo	3–5	Sampdoria	Reggio Emilia
15:00 CET (UTC+01:00)	Boga 38'; Duncan (yellow card) 45+5', (goal) 63'; Babacar 90+2'	Report	Defrel 15'; Quagliarella 36'; Linetty 39'; Praet 46'; Gabbiadini (yellow card) 48', (goal) 72'	Stadium: Mapei Stadium – Città del Tricolore; Attendance: 11,193; Referee: Federico Dionisi

31 March 2019 29	Bologna	2–1	Sassuolo	Bologna
18:00 CEST (UTC+02:00)	Helander (yellow card) 22'; Pulgar 68' (pen.); Destro 90+6', (yellow card) 90+8'	Report	Demiral (yellow card) 29'; Sensi (yellow card) 61'; Bourabia (yellow card) 86'; Boga 90+2'	Stadium: Stadio Renato Dall'Ara; Attendance: 23,551; Referee: Marco Guida

4 April 2019 30	Sassuolo	4–0	Chievo	Reggio Emilia
19:00 CEST (UTC+02:00)	Demiral 4', 45'; Peluso (yellow card) 31'; Locatelli 47'; Berardi 57'	Report	Kiyine (yellow card) 33'	Stadium: Mapei Stadium – Città del Tricolore; Attendance: 9,193; Referee: Lorenzo Maggioni

7 April 2019 31	Lazio	2–2	Sassuolo	Rome
18:00 CEST (UTC+02:00)	Parolo (yellow card) 31'; Immobile 53' (pen.); Badelj (yellow card) 78'; Lulić 90+5'	Report	Locatelli (yellow card) 52'; Rogério 57'; Berardi 89'	Stadium: Stadio Olimpico; Attendance: 37,487; Referee: Rosario Abisso

14 April 2019 32	Sassuolo	0–0	Parma	Reggio Emilia
15:00 CEST (UTC+02:00)	Matri (yellow card) 53'; Ferrari (yellow card) 86'; Sensi (yellow card) 90+3'	Report	Scozzarella (yellow card) 75'; Dimarco (yellow card) 90'	Stadium: Mapei Stadium – Città del Tricolore; Attendance: 12,538; Referee: Marco Piccinini

20 April 2019 33	Udinese	1–1	Sassuolo	Udine
15:00 CEST (UTC+02:00)	Mandragora (yellow card) 14'; Sandro (yellow card) 28'; Stryger Larsen (yellow card) 71'; Lirola 80' (o.g.)	Report	Demiral (yellow card) 25'; Sensi 31'; Locatelli (yellow card) 79'	Stadium: Dacia Arena; Attendance: 22,343; Referee: Luca Pairetto

29 April 2019 34	Fiorentina	0–1	Sassuolo	Florence
21:00 CEST (UTC+02:00)	Laurini (yellow card) 8'; Pezzella (yellow card) 29'; Medja (yellow card) 85'	Report	Berardi 37'; Peluso (yellow card) 40'	Stadium: Stadio Artemio Franchi; Attendance: 25,567; Referee: Francesco Fourneau

5 May 2019 35	Sassuolo	2–2	Frosinone	Reggio Emilia
15:00 CEST (UTC+02:00)	Bourabia (yellow card) 57'; Ferrari 66'; Boga 78'; Locatelli (yellow card) 80'	Report	Sammarco 8', (yellow card) 23'; Paganini 36'; Brighenti (yellow card) 44'; Sportiello (yellow card) 87'	Stadium: Mapei Stadium – Città del Tricolore; Attendance: 10,073; Referee: Antonio Giua

12 May 2019 36	Torino	3–2	Sassuolo	Turin
12:30 CEST (UTC+02:00)	Lukić (yellow card) 8'; Belotti 56', 82'; Zaza 81'	Report	Bourabia (yellow card) 12' (yellow-red card) 29', (goal) 27'; Ferrari (yellow card) 26'; Lirola 71'; Locatelli (yellow card) 87'; Demiral (yellow card) 90+4'	Stadium: Stadio Olimpico Grande Torino; Attendance: 25,360; Referee: Piero Giacomelli

19 May 2019 37	Sassuolo	0–0	Roma	Reggio Emilia
20:30 CEST (UTC+02:00)	Magnanelli (yellow card) 41'; Brignola (yellow card) 90+6'	Report	Zaniolo (yellow card) 40'; Fazio (yellow card) 49'; Juan Jesus (yellow card) 52'; Nzonzi (yellow card) 86'	Stadium: Mapei Stadium – Città del Tricolore; Attendance: 12,914; Referee: Fabio Maresca

26 May 2019 38	Atalanta	3–1	Sassuolo	Bergamo
20:30 CEST (UTC+02:00)	Zapata 35'; Iličić (yellow card) 38'; De Roon (yellow card) 45+5'; Gómez 53'; Pašalić 65'	Report	Berardi 19', (red card) 45+5'; Rogério (yellow card) 45+4'; Magnanelli (yellow card) 45+5' (yellow-red card) 83'; Ferrari (yellow card) 48'	Stadium: Stadio Atleti Azzurri d'Italia; Attendance: 14,376; Referee: Daniele Doveri

=== Coppa Italia ===
12 August 2018 Third round	Sassuolo	5–1	Ternana	Reggio Emilia
20:30 CEST (UTC+02:00)	Boateng 9'; Rogério (yellow card) 18'; Berardi 23' (pen.), 41'; Duncan 29', (yellow card) 43'; Magnanelli 81'	Report	López (yellow card) 69'; Defendi 72'	Stadium: Mapei Stadium – Città del Tricolore; Attendance: 1,307; Referee: Gianpaolo Calvarese

5 December 2018 Fourth round	Sassuolo	2–1	Catania	Reggio Emilia
18:00 CET (UTC+01:00)	Matri 14'; Peluso (yellow card) 52'; Locatelli 80'; Brignola (yellow card) 89'	Report	Brodić 41'; Silvestri (yellow card) 86'	Stadium: Mapei Stadium – Città del Tricolore; Attendance: 1,098; Referee: Antonio Rapuano

13 January 2019 Round of 16	Napoli	2–0	Sassuolo	Naples
20:45 CET (UTC+01:00)	Milik 15'; Maksimović (yellow card) 34'; Ounas (yellow card) 64'; Mário Rui (yellow card) 71'; Fabián 74'	Report	Berardi (yellow card) 45'; Magnani (yellow card) 45+1'; Locatelli (yellow card) 49'; Peluso (yellow card) 58'	Stadium: Stadio San Paolo; Attendance: 14,908; Referee: Daniele Chiffi

== Statistics ==
=== Appearances and goals ===
No.	Pos	Nat	Player	Total		Serie A		Coppa Italia	
No.	Pos	Nat	Player	Apps	Goals	Apps	Goals	Apps	Goals
Goalkeepers
28	GK	(Italy) ITA	Giacomo Satalino	0	0	0	0	0	0
47	GK	(Italy) ITA	Andrea Consigli	37	0	36	0	1	0
79	GK	(Italy) ITA	Gianluca Pegolo	5	0	2+1	0	2	0
Defenders
2	DF	(Brazil) BRA	Marlon	18	1	18	1	0	0
3	DF	(Turkey) TUR	Merih Demiral	14	2	14	2	0	0
5	DF	(Uruguay) URU	Mauricio Lemos	4	0	3	0	1	0
6	DF	(Brazil) BRA	Rogério	35	1	29+4	1	2	0
13	DF	(Italy) ITA	Federico Peluso	18	1	14+2	1	2	0
17	DF	(Italy) ITA	Leonardo Sernicola	1	0	0+1	0	0	0
21	DF	(Spain) ESP	Pol Lirola	38	2	32+3	2	2+1	0
23	DF	(Italy) ITA	Giangiacomo Magnani	22	0	17+2	0	3	0
31	DF	(Italy) ITA	Gian Marco Ferrari	32	4	31	4	1	0
98	DF	(Italy) ITA	Claud Adjapong	5	1	3+2	1	0	0
Midfielders
4	MF	(Italy) ITA	Francesco Magnanelli	28	1	21+5	0	2	1
9	MF	(Serbia) SRB	Filip Đuričić	25	2	16+7	2	2	0
12	MF	(Italy) ITA	Stefano Sensi	30	2	23+5	2	2	0
20	MF	(Ivory Coast) CIV	Jérémie Boga	27	3	14+11	3	0+2	0
32	MF	(Ghana) GHA	Alfred Duncan	28	5	21+5	4	2	1
68	MF	(France) FRA	Mehdi Bourabia	34	1	21+11	1	0+2	0
73	MF	(Italy) ITA	Manuel Locatelli	31	3	21+8	2	2	1
Forwards
10	FW	(Italy) ITA	Alessandro Matri	20	3	6+13	2	1	1
11	FW	(Italy) ITA	Gianluca Scamacca	0	0	0	0	0	0
18	FW	(Italy) ITA	Giacomo Raspadori	1	0	0+1	0	0	0
19	FW	(Denmark) DEN	Jens Odgaard	1	0	0+1	0	0	0
25	FW	(Italy) ITA	Domenico Berardi	37	10	32+3	8	2	2
30	FW	(Senegal) SEN	Khouma Babacar	31	7	16+13	7	0+2	0
34	FW	(Italy) ITA	Federico Di Francesco	21	2	14+5	2	1+1	0
99	FW	(Italy) ITA	Enrico Brignola	8	1	2+5	1	1	0
Players transferred out during the season
22	MF	(Italy) ITA	Davide Frattesi	0	0	0	0	0	0
27	MF	(Ghana) GHA	Kevin-Prince Boateng	15	5	11+2	4	2	1
29	FW	(Italy) ITA	Marcello Trotta	2	0	0+1	0	1	0
39	DF	(Italy) ITA	Cristian Dell'Orco	5	0	1+2	0	1+1	0

Last updated: 26 May 2019
Source: Competitions

=== Goalscorers ===
Rank	No.	Pos	Nat	Name	Serie A	Coppa Italia	Total
1	25	FW	(Italy)	Domenico Berardi	8	2	10
2	30	FW	(Senegal)	Khouma Babacar	7	0	7
3	27	MF	(Ghana)	Kevin-Prince Boateng	4	1	5
3	32	MF	(Ghana)	Alfred Duncan	4	1	5
5	31	DF	(Italy)	Gian Marco Ferrari	4	0	4
6	10	FW	(Italy)	Alessandro Matri	2	1	3
6	20	MF	(Ivory Coast)	Jérémie Boga	3	0	3
6	73	MF	(Italy)	Manuel Locatelli	2	1	3
9	3	DF	(Turkey)	Merih Demiral	2	0	2
9	9	MF	(Serbia)	Filip Đuričić	2	0	2
9	12	MF	(Italy)	Stefano Sensi	2	0	2
9	21	DF	(Spain)	Pol Lirola	2	0	2
9	34	FW	(Italy)	Federico Di Francesco	2	0	2
14	2	DF	(Brazil)	Marlon	1	0	1
14	4	MF	(Italy)	Francesco Magnanelli	0	1	1
14	6	DF	(Brazil)	Rogério	1	0	1
14	13	DF	(Italy)	Federico Peluso	1	0	1
14	68	MF	(France)	Mehdi Bourabia	1	0	1
14	98	DF	(Italy)	Claud Adjapong	1	0	1
14	99	FW	(Italy)	Enrico Brignola	1	0	1
Own goal					3	0	3
Totals					53	7	60

Last updated: 26 May 2019

=== Clean sheets ===
Rank	No.	Pos	Nat	Name	Serie A	Coppa Italia	Total
1	47	GK	(Italy)	Andrea Consigli	12	0	12
Totals					12	0	12

Last updated: 26 May 2019

=== Disciplinary record ===
No.	Pos	Nat	Name	Serie A			Coppa Italia			Total		
No.	Pos	Nat	Name	Booked	(yellow card) (yellow-red card)	Sent off (straight red)	Booked	(yellow card) (yellow-red card)	Sent off (straight red)	Booked	(yellow card) (yellow-red card)	Sent off (straight red)
47	GK	(Italy)	Andrea Consigli	2	0	1	0	0	0	2	0	1
79	GK	(Italy)	Gianluca Pegolo	1	0	0	0	0	0	1	0	0
2	DF	(Brazil)	Marlon	3	1	0	0	0	0	3	1	0
3	DF	(Turkey)	Merih Demiral	3	0	0	0	0	0	3	0	0
6	DF	(Brazil)	Rogério	9	0	1	1	0	0	10	0	1
13	DF	(Italy)	Federico Peluso	5	0	0	2	0	0	7	0	0
21	DF	(Spain)	Pol Lirola	2	0	0	0	0	0	2	0	0
23	DF	(Italy)	Giangiacomo Magnani	2	0	0	1	0	0	3	0	0
31	DF	(Italy)	Gian Marco Ferrari	9	0	0	0	0	0	9	0	0
98	DF	(Italy)	Claud Adjapong	1	0	0	0	0	0	1	0	0
4	MF	(Italy)	Francesco Magnanelli	3	1	0	0	0	0	3	1	0
9	MF	(Serbia)	Filip Đuričić	2	0	1	0	0	0	2	0	1
12	MF	(Italy)	Stefano Sensi	8	0	0	0	0	0	8	0	0
27	MF	(Ghana)	Kevin-Prince Boateng	1	0	0	0	0	0	1	0	0
32	MF	(Ghana)	Alfred Duncan	7	0	1	1	0	0	8	0	1
68	MF	(France)	Mehdi Bourabia	7	1	0	0	0	0	7	1	0
73	MF	(Italy)	Manuel Locatelli	7	0	0	1	0	0	8	0	0
10	FW	(Italy)	Alessandro Matri	3	0	0	0	0	0	3	0	0
25	FW	(Italy)	Domenico Berardi	5	0	1	1	0	0	6	0	1
34	FW	(Italy)	Federico Di Francesco	2	0	0	0	0	0	2	0	0
99	FW	(Italy)	Enrico Brignola	2	0	0	1	0	0	3	0	0
Totals				83	3	5	8	0	0	91	3	5

Last updated: 26 May 2019
