= Mazzitelli =

Mazzitelli is an Italian surname. Notable people with the surname include:

- Luca Mazzitelli (born 1995), Italian footballer
