= Maximiliano Lemos =

Uruguayan footballer (born 1993)

Maximliano Lemos
Personal information
- Full name: Pablo Maximiliano Lemos Merladett
- Date of birth: 17 December 1993 (age 32)
- Place of birth: Rivera, Uruguay
- Height: 1.73 m (5 ft 8 in)
- Position: Midfielder

Team information
- Current team: Comerciantes
- Number: 23

Youth career
- 2009–2012: Defensor Sporting

Senior career*
Years	Team	Apps	(Gls)
2012–2014	Defensor Sporting	0	(0)
2014–2018	Juventud	28	(2)
2017	→ Villa Teresa (loan)	10	(0)
2018–2019	Alianza Lima	37	(3)
2019–2020	Deportivo Maldonado	15	(0)
2020–2021	Rentistas	36	(5)
2021	Danubio	14	(0)
2022	Miramar Misiones	23	(1)
2023	Libertad Gran Mamoré	25	(5)
2024–	Comerciantes	19	(7)
- * Club domestic league appearances and goals as of 1 September 2024

Pablo Maximiliano Lemos Merladett (born 17 December 1993) is a Uruguayan footballer who plays as a midfielder for Comerciantes in the Peruvian Segunda División.

== Career ==
=== Rentistas ===
Prior to the 2020 season, Lemos moved to Rentistas from Deportivo Maldonado. He made his league debut for the club on 16 February 2020, coming on as a 55th minute substitute for Bryan Bautista in a 2-0 home victory over Nacional.

== Personal life ==
Lemos is the older brother of footballer Mauricio Lemos.

== Career statistics ==
=== Club ===
As of 27 November 2023.

Club	Division	Season	League		Cup		Continental		Total	
Club	Division	Season	Apps	Goals	Apps	Goals	Apps	Goals	Apps	Goals
Juventud	Uruguayan Primera División	2015	1	0	—		2	0	3	0
Juventud	Uruguayan Primera División	2016	16	1	—		—		16	1
Villa Teresa	Uruguayan Segunda División	2017	12	0	—		—		12	0
Juventud	Uruguayan Primera División	2017	11	1	—		—		11	1
Juventud	Total		28	2	—		2	0	30	2
Alianza Lima	Peruvian Primera División	2018	36	3	—		4	0	40	3
Deportivo Maldonado	Uruguayan Primera División	2019	15	0	—		—		15	0
Rentistas	Uruguayan Primera División	2020	36	5	—		—		36	5
Danubio	Uruguayan Primera División	2021	14	0	—		—		14	0
Miramar Misiones	Uruguayan Segunda División	2022	23	0	1	0	—		24	0
Libertad Gran Mamoré	Bolivian Primera División	2023	25	5	6	1	—		31	6
Career total			189	15	7	1	6	0	202	16
