= Pol Lirola =

Spanish footballer (born 1997)

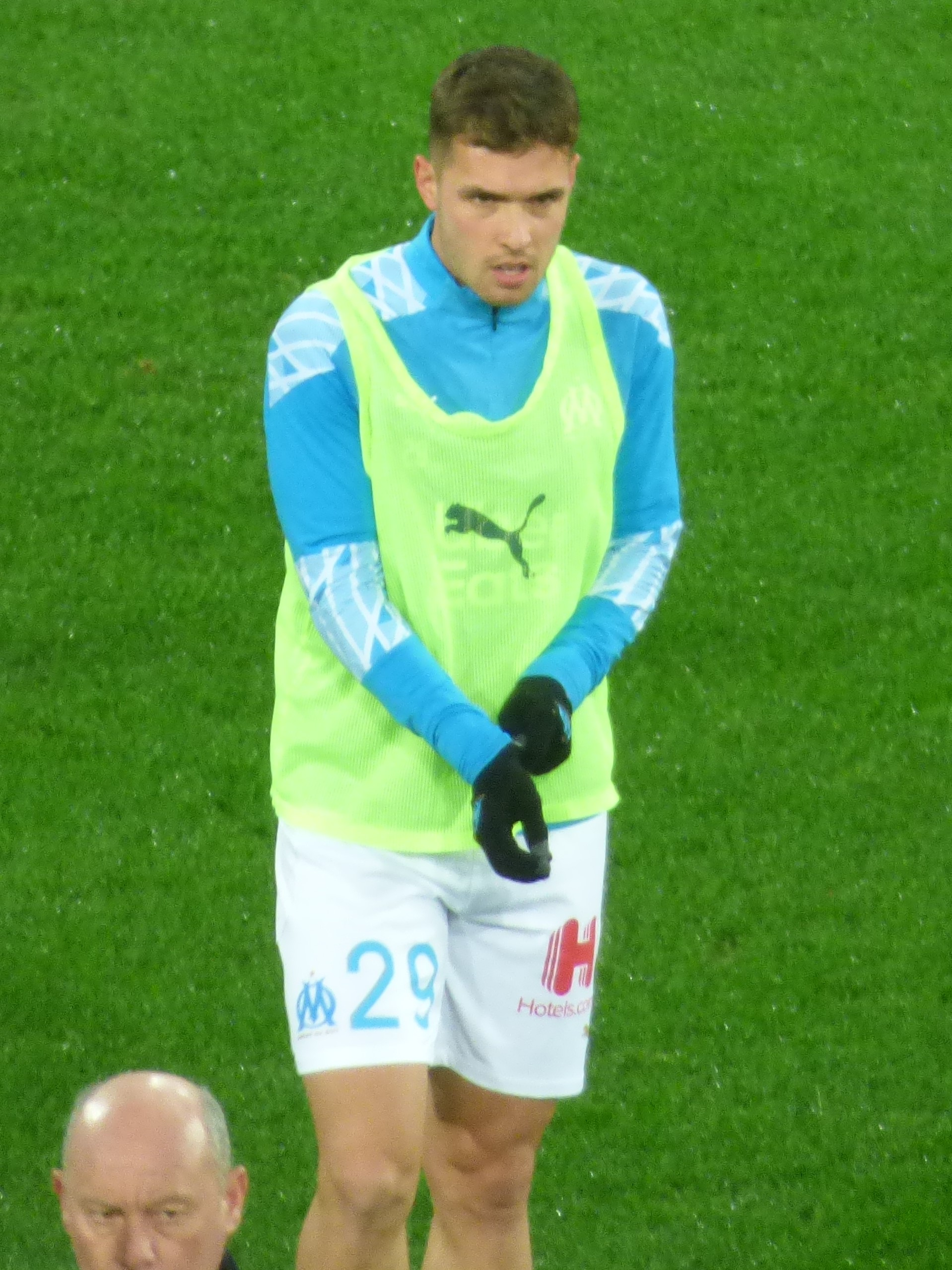
- Lirola with Marseille in 2021

Personal information
- Full name: Pol Mikel Lirola Kosok
- Date of birth: 13 August 1997 (age 29)
- Place of birth: Mollet del Vallès, Spain
- Height: 1.83 m (6 ft 0 in)
- Position: Right-back

Youth career
- 2013–2015: Espanyol
- 2015: → Juventus (loan)
- 2015–2016: Juventus

Senior career*
Years	Team	Apps	(Gls)
2014–2015	Espanyol B	1	(0)
2016	Juventus	0	(0)
2016–2019	Sassuolo	81	(2)
2019–2021	Fiorentina	47	(0)
2021	→ Marseille (loan)	19	(2)
2021–2026	Marseille	56	(2)
2022–2023	→ Elche (loan)	12	(1)
2023–2024	→ Frosinone (loan)	25	(2)
2026	Hellas Verona	6	(0)

International career^{‡}
2013	Spain U17	1	(0)
2017–2018	Spain U21	2	(0)
2016	Catalonia	1	(0)
- * Club domestic league appearances and goals as of 25 May 2026 ‡ National team caps and goals as of 11 October 2018

Pol Mikel Lirola Kosok (born 13 August 1997) is a Spanish professional footballer who plays as a right-back.

== Club career ==
=== Espanyol ===
Born in Mollet del Vallès, Barcelona, Catalonia, Lirola started his career at RCD Espanyol youth system, making his debut with B team in the Spanish third division in 2014. Lirola was sent on loan to Italian side Juventus in January 2015, where he joined the club's youth side.

=== Juventus ===
During the summer session of the transfer market later that year, Juventus bought Lirola outright. On 28 July 2016, he moved to Sassuolo on a two-year loan.

Lirola made his official professional debut in the play-off round of the UEFA Europa League, assisting Domenico Berardi's goal in a 1–1 away draw against Red Star Belgrade, which enabled the club to qualify for the group stage of the competition for the first time in their history. In the same competition, he scored the opening goal, the first of his career, in a 3–0 home win over Athletic Bilbao on 15 September, in the club's opening group match; this was the club's historic first ever goal in official European competitions.

=== Sassuolo ===
On 31 January 2018, Sassuolo signed Lirola outright, for €7 million fee.

=== Fiorentina ===
On 1 August 2019, Lirola joined Serie A side Fiorentina on loan with an obligation to buy.

=== Marseille ===
On 12 January 2021, Lirola joined French side Marseille, on a loan until the end of the season.

==== Loan to Elche ====
On 12 August 2022, Lirola moved to La Liga club Elche on loan with an option to buy.

=== Hellas Verona ===
On 18 January 2026, he joined Serie A club Hellas Verona for free on a six-month deal.

== International career ==
Lirola has represented the Spain at the under-17 level in 2013. On 28 December 2016, he made his debut for the Catalonia national football team, starting in a 3–3 draw against Tunisia (2–4 penalty loss).

== Personal life ==
Lirola is of German descent through his mother. He holds a German passport, and speaks the language fluently.

== Career statistics ==
As of match played 1 November 2025

Appearances and goals by club, season and competition
Club	Season	League			National cup (Note: Includes Coppa Italia, Coupe de France, Copa del Rey)		Europe		Other		Total	
Club	Season	Division	Apps	Goals	Apps	Goals	Apps	Goals	Apps	Goals	Apps	Goals
Espanyol B	2014–15	Segunda División B	1	0	—		—		—		1	0
Juventus	2016–17	Serie A	0	0	0	0	0	0	0	0	0	0
Sassuolo (loan)	2016–17	Serie A	22	0	0	0	7 (Note: Appearances in UEFA Europa League)	1	—		29	1
Sassuolo (loan)	2017–18	Serie A	24	0	2	0	—		—		26	0
Sassuolo (loan)	Total		46	0	2	0	7	1	—		55	1
Sassuolo	2018–19	Serie A	35	2	3	0	—		—		38	2
Fiorentina (loan)	2019–20	Serie A	35	0	4	1	—		—		39	1
Fiorentina	2020–21	Serie A	12	0	1	0	—		—		13	0
Marseille (loan)	2020–21	Ligue 1	19	2	2	0	—		1 (Note: Appearance in Trophée des Champions)	0	22	2
Marseille	2021–22	Ligue 1	34	1	4	0	13 (Note: Six appearances in UEFA Europa League, seven appearances in UEFA Europa Conference League)	0	—		51	1
Marseille	2024–25	Ligue 1	19	1	0	0	0	0	—		19	1
Marseille	2025–26	Ligue 1	3	0	0	0	0	0	—		3	0
Marseille	Total		56	2	4	0	13	0	—		73	2
Elche (loan)	2022–23	La Liga	12	1	1	0	—		—		13	1
Frosinone (loan)	2023–24	Serie A	16	2	3	0	—		—		19	2
Career total			232	9	20	1	20	1	1	0	273	11

== Honours ==
Spain U21

- UEFA European Under-21 Championship: 2019
