= Mauricio Lemos =

Uruguayan footballer (born 1995)

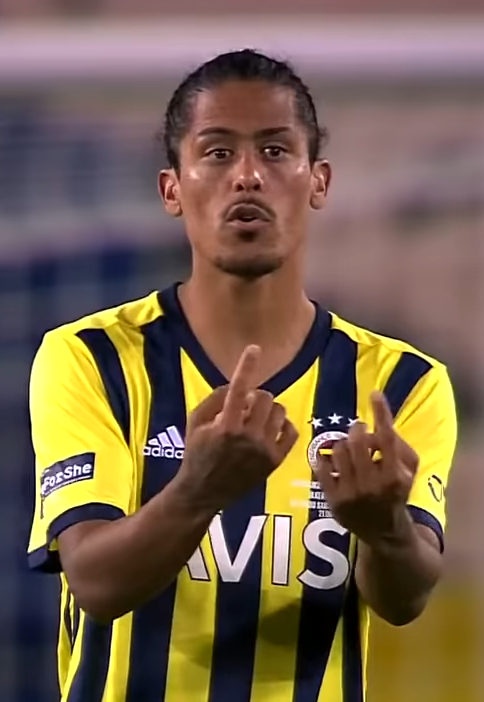
- Lemos with Fenerbahçe in 2020

Personal information
- Full name: Paolo Mauricio Lemos Merladett
- Date of birth: 28 December 1995 (age 30)
- Place of birth: Rivera, Uruguay
- Height: 1.87 m (6 ft 2 in)
- Position: Centre-back

Team information
- Current team: Peñarol
- Number: 3

Youth career
- –2013: Defensor Sporting

Senior career*
Years	Team	Apps	(Gls)
2013–2015	Defensor Sporting	9	(0)
2015–2016	Rubin Kazan	4	(0)
2016–2020	Las Palmas	75	(6)
2018–2019	→ Sassuolo (loan)	11	(1)
2020–2023	Fenerbahçe	10	(0)
2021–2022	→ Beerschot (loan)	15	(1)
2023–2024	Atlético Mineiro	44	(3)
2025	Vasco da Gama	5	(0)
2026-	Peñarol	4	(0)

International career
2014–2015	Uruguay U20	22	(2)
2015	Uruguay U22	3	(0)
2017–2023	Uruguay	3	(0)
Medal record
Representing Uruguay
Men's Football
Pan American Games
Gold medal – first place	2015 Toronto	Team
- * Club domestic league appearances and goals as of 13 April 2026

Paolo Mauricio Lemos Merladett (born 28 December 1995) is a Uruguayan professional footballer who plays as a centre-back for Peñarol.

== Club career ==
=== Defensor ===
Born in Rivera, Lemos was a Defensor Sporting youth graduate. On 6 January 2014, aged 18, he was promoted to the main squad.

Lemos made his professional debut on 11 May 2014, starting in a 2–1 home loss against Montevideo Wanderers. After appearing in only two matches during his debut campaign, he was more regularly used in his second; however, his appearances were limited due to an appendicitis and call-ups to the under-20 national team.

=== Rubin Kazan ===
On 3 July 2015, Lemos was loaned to Russian Premier League side FC Rubin Kazan, for one year. He made his debut for the club on 3 August, playing the full 90 minutes in a 1–0 away defeat to Spartak Moscow.

After appearing in eight matches for the club (four in the league), Lemos was bought outright.

=== Las Palmas ===
On 28 January 2016, Lemos was loaned to La Liga side UD Las Palmas, with a buyout clause. He made his debut in the competition on 20 February, coming on as a second-half substitute for Jonathan Viera in a 1–2 home loss against FC Barcelona.

On 6 May 2016, after appearing in nine matches for the Amarillos, Lemos signed a permanent five-year deal with the club effective in July. He scored his first goal in the main category of Spanish football the following 30 January, netting his team's second in a 3–1 home win against Valencia CF.

On 10 March 2017, Lemos scored a brace in a 4–3 away win against RCD Espanyol.

==== Sassuolo (loan) ====
On 22 January 2018, Las Palmas announced they had reached an agreement with Italian club Sassuolo for the loan of Lemos.

=== Fenerbahçe ===
On 26 August 2020, Fenerbahçe announced the signing of Lemos on a three-year contract.

==== Beerschot (loan) ====
On 31 August 2021, Lemos was loaned to Belgian club K Beerschot VA for the 2021–22 season.

=== Atlético Mineiro ===
On 16 February 2023, Lemos joined Brazilian club Atlético Mineiro on a ten-month deal.

=== Vasco da Gama ===
On 15 January 2025, Lemos signed a one-year deal with Vasco da Gama.

=== Peñarol ===
He signed for Urugyuan club Peñarol in February 2026, something he described as a dream. He told the club that "you'll have a fan on the pitch".

== International career ==
Lemos has represented Uruguay with the U22 team at 2015 Pan American Games, winning the gold medal.

He received maiden call-up to senior team in October 2017 and was included in the squad to play friendlies against Poland and Austria. He made his debut on 10 November 2017, playing 90 minutes in a 0–0 draw against Poland.

== Personal life ==
Lemos is the younger brother of footballer Maximiliano Lemos.

== Career statistics ==
=== Club ===
As of 15 December 2024

Appearances and goals by club, season and competition
Club	Season	League			National cup (Note: Includes Russian Cup, Copa del Rey, Coppa Italia, Turkish Cup, Belgian Cup)		Continental		Other		Total	
Club	Season	Division	Apps	Goals	Apps	Goals	Apps	Goals	Apps	Goals	Apps	Goals
Defensor	2013–14	Uruguayan Primera División	2	0	–		0	0	–		2	0
Defensor	2014–15	Uruguayan Primera División	7	0	–		–		–		7	0
Defensor	Total		9	0	–		0	0	–		9	0
Rubin Kazan	2015–16	Russian Premier League	4	0	1	0	2 (Note: Appearances in UEFA Europa League)	0	–		7	0
Las Palmas	2015–16	La Liga	10	0	0	0	–		–		10	0
Las Palmas	2016–17	La Liga	23	5	3	0	–		–		26	5
Las Palmas	2017–18	La Liga	16	0	2	0	–		–		18	0
Las Palmas	2019–20	Segunda División	26	1	1	0	–		–		27	1
Las Palmas	Total		75	6	6	0	–		–		81	6
Sassuolo (loan)	2017–18	Serie A	8	1	0	0	–		–		8	1
Sassuolo (loan)	2018–19	Serie A	3	0	1	0	–		–		4	0
Sassuolo (loan)	Total		11	1	1	0	–		–		12	1
Fenerbahçe	2020–21	Süper Lig	8	0	2	0	–		–		10	0
Fenerbahçe	2022–23	Süper Lig	2	0	0	0	3	0	–		5	0
Fenerbahçe	Total		10	0	0	0	3	0	–		15	0
Beerschot (loan)	2021–22	Belgian First Division A	15	1	1	0	–		–		16	1
Atlético Mineiro	2023	Série A	27	1	2	0	8 (Note: Appearances in Copa Libertadores)	0	4 (Note: Appearances in Campeonato Mineiro)	0	41	1
Atlético Mineiro	2024	Série A	8	0	2	0	1	0	5	2	16	2
Atlético Mineiro	Total		35	1	4	0	9	0	9	2	57	3
Career total			159	9	15	0	14	0	9	2	197	11

=== International ===
As of 30 June 2023

Appearances and goals by national team and year
National team	Year	Apps	Goals
Uruguay	2017	1	0
Uruguay	2018	1	0
Uruguay	2023	1	0
Total		3	0

== Honours ==
Atlético Mineiro

- Campeonato Mineiro: 2023, 2024
