= Giacomo Satalino =

Italian footballer (born 1999)

Personal information
- Date of birth: 20 May 1999 (age 27)
- Place of birth: Putignano, Italy
- Height: 1.88 m (6 ft 2 in)
- Position: Goalkeeper

Team information
- Current team: Sassuolo
- Number: 12

Youth career
- –2013: Esperia Monopoli
- 2013–2017: Fiorentina
- 2017–2018: Sassuolo

Senior career*
Years	Team	Apps	(Gls)
2016–2017	Fiorentina	0	(0)
2017–	Sassuolo	11	(0)
2019–2020	→ Renate (loan)	27	(0)
2020–2021	→ Cesena (loan)	6	(0)
2021	→ Monopoli (loan)	10	(0)
2022–2023	→ Carrarese (loan)	23	(0)
2023–2024	→ Reggiana (loan)	9	(0)

International career^{‡}
2014–2015	Italy U16	5	(0)
2015	Italy U17	1	(0)
2016	Italy U18	1	(0)
- * Club domestic league appearances and goals as of 17 May 2025 ‡ National team caps and goals as of 16 November 2016

Giacomo Satalino (born 20 May 1999) is an Italian professional footballer who plays as a goalkeeper for Serie A club Sassuolo.

== Club career ==
=== Fiorentina ===
Satalino started playing for Serie A side Fiorentina's under-19 squad in the 2015–16 season. In that season and the next, he appeared on the bench as a backup for the senior squad 26 times in different competitions, but did not see any time on the field.

=== Sassuolo ===
In July 2017, Satalino transferred to fellow-Serie A club Sassuolo, and spent the 2017–18 season in their under-19 squad. In the 2018–19 season, he appeared on the bench for the senior squad 17 times, but again did not see any field time.

==== Loan to Renate ====
On 31 July 2019, Satalino joined Serie C club Renate on a season-long loan. He made his professional league debut on 25 August 2019, in a season-opening game against Giana Erminio. He established himself as first-choice goalkeeper for Renate early in the season.

==== Loan to Cesena ====
On 1 September 2020, Satalino went to Cesena on loan, also in the Serie C. He began the season as a starter, but was injured in his sixth game; upon recovery from the injury he could not reclaim the first-goalkeeper spot that had been taken over by Michele Nardi.

==== Loan to Monopoli ====
On 15 January 2021, he was loaned to Monopoli.

==== Return to Sassuolo and Serie A debut ====
Satalino made his Serie A debut for Sassuolo on 22 May 2022 against Milan, on the last day of the 2021–22 season with 8 minutes left in the game that Sassuolo lost 0–3.

==== Loan to Carrarese ====
On 2 August 2022, Satalino was loaned by Carrarese.

== International career ==
Satalino made his first appearances representing his country internationally in 2014, in friendly games for the under-16 team. He also played at under-17 and under-18 levels.

== Career statistics ==
As of match played 9 May 2025

Appearances and goals by club, season and competition
Club	Season	League			National cup		Continental		Other		Total	
Club	Season	Division	Apps	Goals	Apps	Goals	Apps	Goals	Apps	Goals	Apps	Goals
Fiorentina	2015–16	Serie A	0	0	0	0	0	0	—		0	0
Fiorentina	2016–17	Serie A	0	0	0	0	—		—		0	0
Fiorentina	Total		0	0	0	0	0	0	—		0	0
Sassuolo	2017–18	Serie A	0	0	0	0	—		—		0	0
Sassuolo	2018–19	Serie A	0	0	0	0	—		—		0	0
Sassuolo	2021–22	Serie A	1	0	0	0	—		—		1	0
Sassuolo	2024–25	Serie B	10	0	3	0	—		—		13	0
Sassuolo	2025–26	Serie A	0	0	0	0	—		—		0	0
Sassuolo	2026–27	Serie A	0	0	0	0	—		—		0	0
Sassuolo	Total		11	0	3	0	—		—		14	0
Renate (loan)	2019–20	Serie C	27	0	—		—		3	0	30	0
Cesena (loan)	2020–21	Serie C	6	0	—		—		—		6	0
Monopoli (loan)	2020–21	Serie C	10	0	0	0	—		—		10	0
Carrarese (loan)	2022–23	Serie C	23	0	—		—		0	0	23	0
Reggiana (loan)	2023–24	Serie B	9	0	1	0	—		—		10	0
Career total			86	0	4	0	0	0	3	0	93	0

== Honours ==
Sassuolo

- Serie B: 2024–25
