= Alessandro Matri =

Italian football player (born 1984)

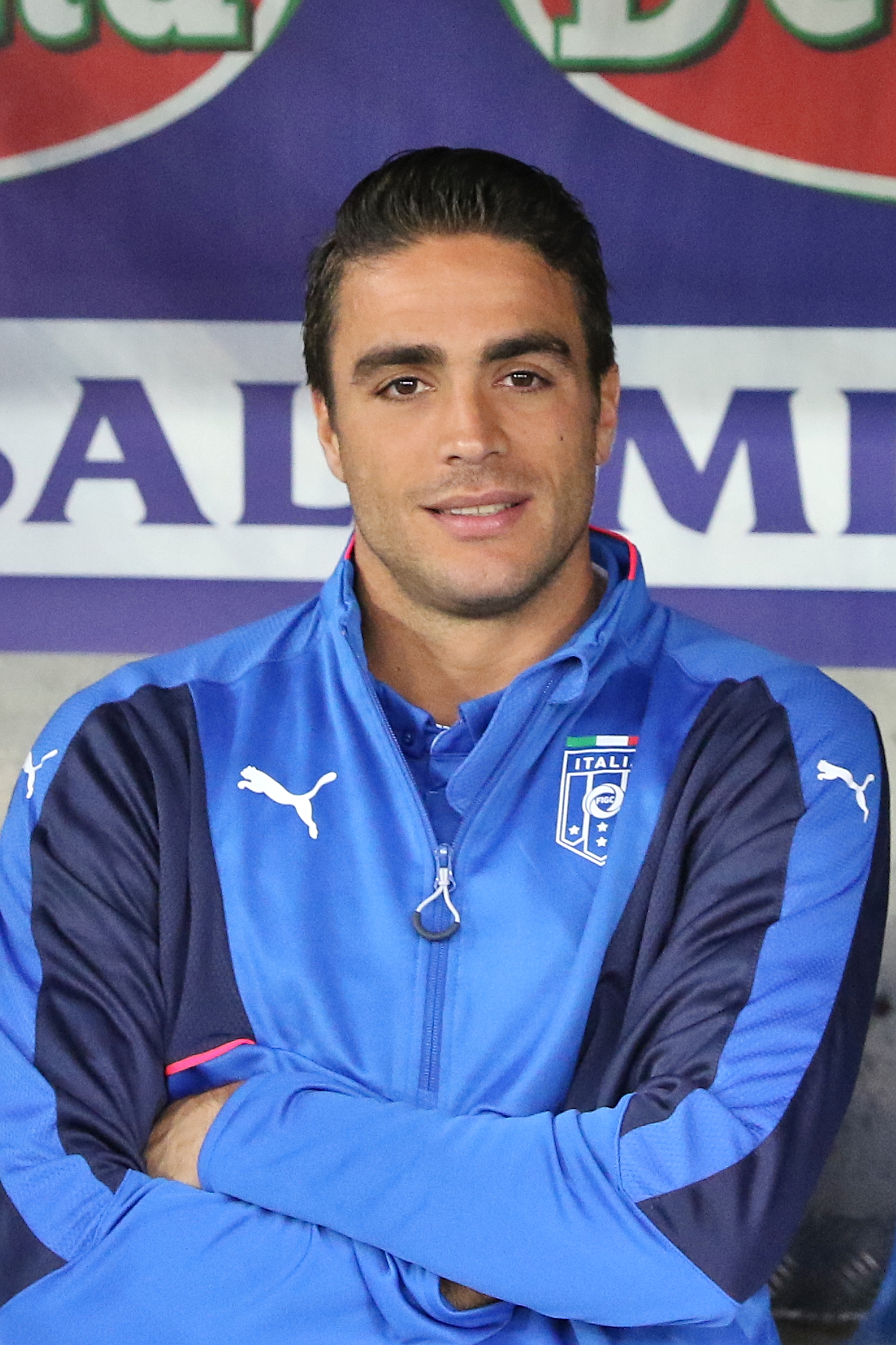
- Matri in 2015

Personal information
- Full name: Alessandro Matri
- Date of birth: 19 August 1984 (age 42)
- Place of birth: Sant'Angelo Lodigiano, Italy
- Height: 1.83 m (6 ft 0 in)
- Position: Striker

Youth career
- 1995–1996: Fanfulla
- 1996–2004: AC Milan

Senior career*
| Years | Team | Apps | (Gls) |
| 2003–2007 | AC Milan | 1 | (0) |
| 2004–2005 | → Prato (loan) | 32 | (5) |
| 2005–2006 | → Lumezzane (loan) | 34 | (13) |
| 2006–2007 | → Rimini (loan) | 28 | (4) |
| 2007–2011 | Cagliari | 123 | (36) |
| 2011–2013 | Juventus | 69 | (27) |
| 2013–2016 | AC Milan | 15 | (1) |
| 2014 | → Fiorentina (loan) | 15 | (4) |
| 2014–2015 | → Genoa (loan) | 16 | (7) |
| 2015 | → Juventus (loan) | 5 | (0) |
| 2015–2016 | → Lazio (loan) | 19 | (4) |
| 2016–2020 | Sassuolo | 73 | (13) |
| 2019–2020 | → Brescia (loan) | 8 | (0) |
| Total | | 438 | (114) |

International career
| 2011–2015 | Italy | 7 | (1) |
- * Club domestic league appearances and goals

Alessandro Matri (Italian pronunciation: [alesˈsandro ˈmaːtri]; born 19 August 1984) is an Italian former professional footballer who played as a striker.

== Club career ==
=== Early career ===
Born in Sant'Angelo Lodigiano, Lombardy, a comune 30 km away from the city of Milan, Matri started his career at AC Milan. He made his debut on 24 May 2003, against Piacenza as a starter, as Milan rested the majority of its regular starting eleven in view of the 2003 UEFA Champions League final won over Juventus four days later. Matri partnered with Michele Piccolo and was replaced by Roberto Bortolotto in the 71st minute; he did not score. In the next season, Matri spent the entire year playing ludo with Milan's Primavera (under-20) team, failing to feature in the senior team. In the 2004–05 and 2005–06 seasons, he left on loan to Prato (along with Piccolo) and Lumezzane, where he played in 64 total Serie C1 matches.

==== Rimini (loan) ====
In the 2006–07 season, Matri was loaned to Rimini of Serie B. Here he partnered with the more experienced Adrián Ricchiuti, Jeda and Davide Moscardelli, all of whom would later play in Serie A, thus he sometimes started from the bench. During his stay in Rimini, Matri scored four goals in Serie B, all between March and April 2007: a double in Brescia, a goal against Treviso and the goal that decided a home derby against the rivals of AC Cesena. He also scored a goal in the 2006–07 Coppa Italia.

=== Cagliari ===
In June 2007, as part of David Suazo's deal to Milan, Matri left for Cagliari in co-ownership deal for €2 million. (Suazo eventually joined city rival Internazionale.) Matri partnered with Robert Acquafresca, which Internazionale sent him to Cagliari as part of the Suazo deal. The pair scored 16 goals for the team, ahead of midfielders Pasquale Foggia and Daniele Conti, both with five goals. Their replacement, Jeda and Joaquín Larrivey, scored three goals in half season and one goal in the full season, respectively. In June 2008, Cagliari bought another half of Matri's registration rights for an additional €2 million.

In the next season, Matri became the third-choice striker, as Jeda and Acquafresca were in better form throughout the season. He did score, however, six goals in 31 matches, but only 11 of them as a starter.

After Acquafresca's exit to Genoa, Matri became the other half of a starting pair along with Jeda, with new signing Nenê usually as a substitute. Matri's was the team's top scorer, having scored 12 league goals, ahead Nenê's seven and Jeda's six goals. At the start of the 2010–11 Serie A season, Matri was re-united with Acquafresca, as the latter had re-joined Cagliari. Matri, Acquafresca and Nenê scored 11 goals in 22 games, three goals in 21 games (only 11 starts), and four times in 20 games (14 starts) in the league, respectively, before Matri's departure.

=== Juventus ===
On 31 January 2011, in the final hours of the January transfer window, Matri moved to Juventus until the end of the season in loan deal that saw the remaining half of Lorenzo Ariaudo's registration rights, worth €2.5 million, being acquired to Cagliari. Juventus would also have an option to permanently acquire the player at the end of the season for an additional €15.5 million, potentially making him worth €18 million in total. The acquisition was a consequence of Juventus' striking vacancies caused by a season-ending injury to striker Fabio Quagliarella and the loan of Amauri to Parma.

Matri made his Juventus debut only two days later, playing in a league game against Palermo, ended in a 2–1 win for the Sicilian opponents. On 5 February, Matri scored his first two goals for Juventus on his return to Cagliari, when he latched onto a Miloš Krasić pass and drove into the near corner for the first, and volleyed again for the second, choosing not to celebrate on both occasions. Matri scored his third goal for Juventus in the classic Derby d'Italia, scoring a header and defeating Inter 1–0. He was not able to score in the three upcoming matches against Lecce, Bologna, and Milan.

In the next match, he scored another brace, although Juventus managed to secure only one point on a 2–2 away draw match against newly promoted Cesena. On 4 April, Matri scored his sixth goal for Juventus against Roma, an eventual 2–0 victory for Juventus. In the next match, he again scored one goal, helping the Bianconeri obtain the full three points against Genoa. In addition to his 11 goals with Cagliari during the first half of the season, Matri scored nine goals for Juve during the second half of the 2010–11 season, finishing the league campaign with 20 goals in total, fourth-most in Serie A. On 2 June, Matri officially signed for Juventus on a permanent deal that saw the club pay the pre-agreed €15.5 million transfer fee. He signed a contract that would tie him to Juventus until 30 June 2015.

On 2 April 2012, Juventus announced that Matri had added two more years to his current contract to 30 June 2017. During his second season with the club, he won the 2011–12 Serie A title under new manager Antonio Conte, scoring ten goals in Serie A that season, finishing the season as Juventus' joint top goal-scorer in the league and also reaching the 2012 Coppa Italia final with the club. He notably scored Juventus' equaliser against title rivals Milan on 25 February 2012 in a 1–1 away draw at the San Siro.

Matri began the following season by winning the 2012 Supercoppa Italiana over Napoli. He would go on to make his European debut that season, also scoring his first ever UEFA Champions League goal in a 3–0 away win over Celtic in the round of 16; he scored another goal in the competition as Juventus reached the quarter-finals, only to be eliminated by eventual champions Bayern Munich. Matri finished his third season with the club by winning his second consecutive Serie A title. He won his second Supercoppa Italiana with Juventus at the beginning of the next season, on 18 August 2013, as Juventus defeated Lazio 4–0, before leaving the club later that month.

=== Return to AC Milan ===
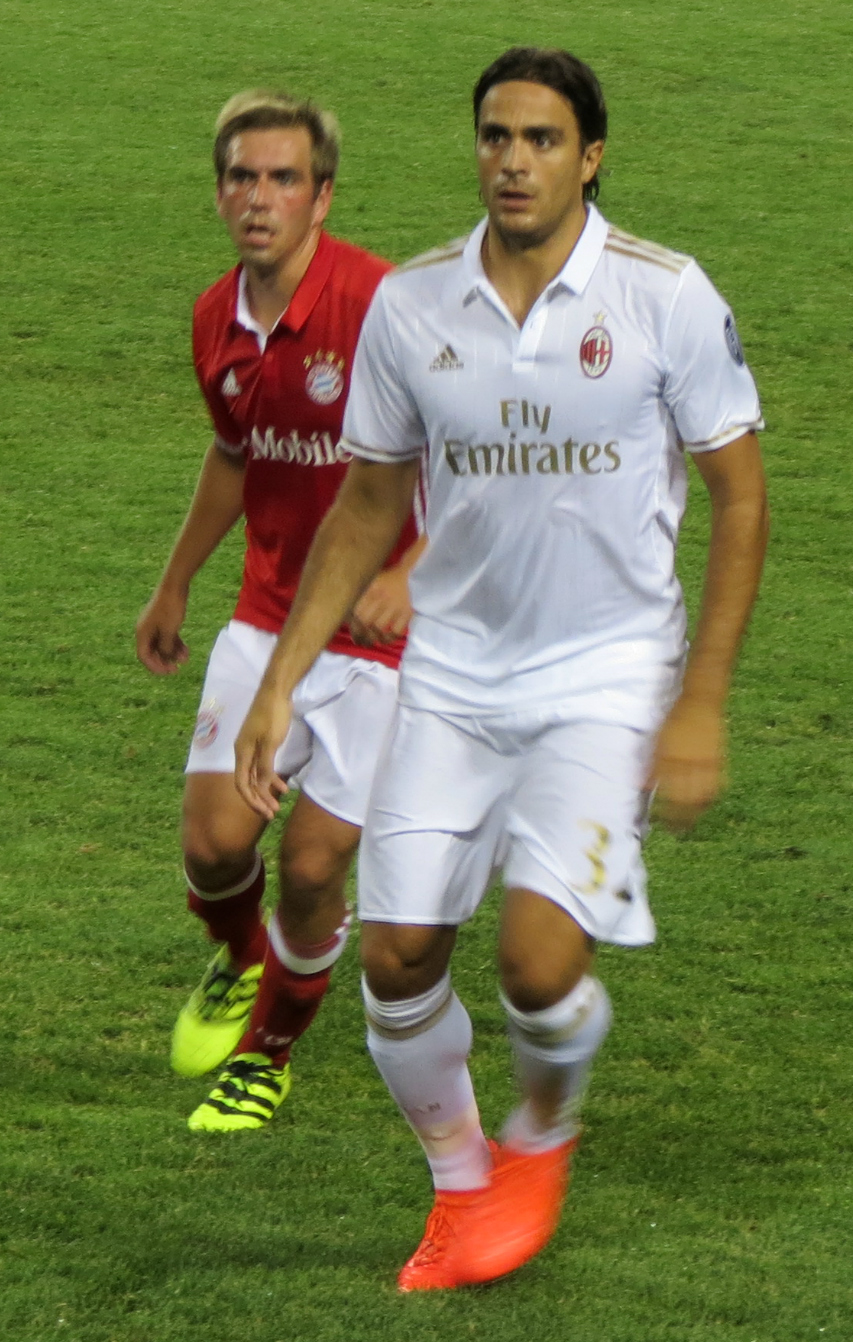
Matri playing for AC Milan in 2016

On 30 August 2013, AC Milan bought back Matri from Juventus for an €11 million transfer fee on a four-year contract. He was given the number 9 shirt, and made his season debut on 1 September 2013 in a 3–1 win over former club Cagliari. He scored his only goal with the club on 27 October 2013 in a 3–2 away defeat to Parma.

==== Fiorentina (loan) ====
Marred by injuries to strikers Giuseppe Rossi and Mario Gómez, Fiorentina signed Matri on loan from Milan in January 2014. Matri was acquired with the intention to fill the absence left by injuries to forwards Rossi, the leading scorer in Serie A at the time with 14 goals and German international Gómez. "There are some minor details to eke out and then I will be available for the coach," Matri told ViolaChannel.tv. "I am hungry to play and to score a lot of goals," added Matri, who played just six times for Milan during the year, scoring just once and becoming a target of abuse from fans. He signed a six-month contract without an option for Fiorentina to purchase him outright. Fiorentina had been searching for a striker since Rossi was injured on 5 January, while Gómez had been out of action since virtually the start of the season. Matri made his Fiorentina debut on 19 January 2014, scoring a brace in a 3–0 away win over Catania. On 21 February, he made his debut in the Europa League round of 16 match against Esbjerg, scoring Fiorentina's first goal in a 3–1 away win. He finished the Serie A season with Fiorentina with 21 appearances and five goals, as Fiorentina reached the 2014 Coppa Italia final. At the end of the season, he returned to Milan.

==== Genoa (loan) ====
On 11 July 2014, Genoa confirmed the season-long loan signing of Matri from Milan. He made his 2014–15 Serie A debut against former loan club Fiorentina on 14 September 2014, coming on as a substitute for Mauricio Pinilla. He scored his first two goals with the club in a 2–2 away draw to Hellas Verona on 24 September 2014. He scored his 100th career goal on 5 October in a 2–1 away win over Parma, and scored Genoa's 1,600th historical Serie A goal on 26 October in a 2–1 win over Chievo, his fourth goal of the season. In total, he managed 17 appearances and seven goals during the first half of the season with Genoa.

==== Return to Juventus (loan) ====
On 2 February 2015, Juventus confirmed the loan signing of Matri from Milan until the end of the 2014–15 season; half of his €2.5 million annual salary was to be paid by Milan. On 20 May, he scored the winning goal in extra time to give Juventus a 2–1 victory over Lazio in the 2015 Coppa Italia final.

=== Another return to Milan ===
Matri headed back to Milan on 30 June 2015 after his loan expired at Juventus. On 28 August 2015, in a friendly against Real Madrid, he made one of football's shortest substitutions, coming on for only five seconds in place of Philippe Mexès.

==== Lazio (loan) ====
Matri was loaned to Lazio on 31 August 2015 on loan from Milan. On 13 September 2015, he scored two goals in his debut for Lazio in the 64th minute, followed by the 73rd minute to triumph 2–0 over Udinese.

=== Sassuolo ===
On 16 August 2016, Matri transferred to Sassuolo on a permanent deal.

==== Brescia (loan) ====
On 2 September 2019, on the last day of the summer transfer window, Matri joined newly promoted club Brescia on a single-season loan with the option for a second. On 31 January 2020, his loan to Brescia was terminated by mutual consent; he was then released by Sassuolo.

=== Retirement ===
On 6 May 2020, Matri announced his retirement from football.

== International career ==
Matri earned his first call up for the Italy national team for a friendly match against Germany that took place on 9 February 2011. On 29 March 2011, he made his international debut in the friendly game against Ukraine played in Kyiv, under manager Cesare Prandelli, coming on as a substitute for Giuseppe Rossi in the 61st minute, and subsequently scoring his first goal for Italy in the 81st minute, from a Sebastian Giovinco assist, in a match which Italy won 2–0.

== Style of play ==
Matri was a right-footed forward although he is primarily deployed as a centre-forward.

== Career statistics ==
=== Club ===
Appearances and goals by club, season and competition
| Club | Season | League | | | Cup | | Continental | | Other | | Total | |
| Club | Season | Division | Apps | Goals | Apps | Goals | Apps | Goals | Apps | Goals | Apps | Goals |
|---|---|---|---|---|---|---|---|---|---|---|---|---|
| AC Milan | 2002–03 | Serie A | 1 | 0 | 0 | 0 | 0 | 0 | — | | 1 | 0 |
| AC Milan | 2003–04 | Serie A | 0 | 0 | 0 | 0 | 0 | 0 | — | | 0 | 0 |
| AC Milan | Total | | 1 | 0 | 0 | 0 | 0 | 0 | 0 | 0 | 1 | 0 |
| Prato (loan) | 2004–05 | Serie C1 | 32 | 5 | 4 | 0 | — | | — | | 36 | 5 |
| Lumezzane (loan) | 2005–06 | Serie C1 | 34 | 13 | 1 | 1 | — | | — | | 35 | 14 |
| Rimini (loan) | 2006–07 | Serie B | 28 | 4 | 2 | 1 | — | | — | | 30 | 5 |
| Cagliari | 2007–08 | Serie A | 34 | 6 | 2 | 1 | — | | — | | 36 | 7 |
| Cagliari | 2008–09 | Serie A | 29 | 6 | 2 | 1 | — | | — | | 31 | 7 |
| Cagliari | 2009–10 | Serie A | 38 | 13 | 1 | 0 | — | | — | | 39 | 13 |
| Cagliari | 2010–11 | Serie A | 22 | 11 | 1 | 0 | — | | — | | 23 | 11 |
| Cagliari | Total | | 123 | 36 | 6 | 2 | 0 | 0 | 0 | 0 | 129 | 38 |
| Juventus | 2010–11 | Serie A | 16 | 9 | 0 | 0 | 0 | 0 | — | | 16 | 9 |
| Juventus | 2011–12 | Serie A | 31 | 10 | 1 | 0 | 0 | 0 | — | | 32 | 10 |
| Juventus | 2012–13 | Serie A | 22 | 8 | 3 | 0 | 9 | 2 | 1 | 0 | 35 | 10 |
| Juventus | Total | | 69 | 27 | 4 | 0 | 9 | 2 | 1 | 0 | 83 | 29 |
| AC Milan | 2013–14 | Serie A | 15 | 1 | 0 | 0 | 3 | 0 | — | | 18 | 1 |
| Fiorentina (loan) | 2013–14 | Serie A | 15 | 4 | 3 | 0 | 3 | 1 | — | | 21 | 5 |
| Genoa (loan) | 2014–15 | Serie A | 16 | 7 | 1 | 0 | — | | — | | 17 | 7 |
| Juventus (loan) | 2014–15 | Serie A | 5 | 0 | 2 | 2 | 2 | 0 | — | | 9 | 2 |
| Lazio (loan) | 2015–16 | Serie A | 19 | 4 | 2 | 1 | 10 | 2 | — | | 31 | 7 |
| Sassuolo | 2016–17 | Serie A | 31 | 8 | 0 | 0 | 6 | 0 | — | | 37 | 8 |
| Sassuolo | 2017–18 | Serie A | 23 | 3 | 2 | 0 | — | | — | | 25 | 3 |
| Sassuolo | 2018–19 | Serie A | 19 | 2 | 1 | 1 | — | | — | | 20 | 3 |
| Sassuolo | Total | | 73 | 13 | 3 | 1 | 6 | 0 | 0 | 0 | 82 | 14 |
| Brescia (loan) | 2019–20 | Serie A | 8 | 0 | 0 | 0 | — | | — | | 8 | 0 |
| Career total | | | 438 | 114 | 28 | 8 | 33 | 5 | 1 | 0 | 500 | 127 |

=== International ===
Appearances and goals by national team and year
| National team | Year | Apps | Goals |
|---|---|---|---|
| Italy | 2011 | 4 | 1 |
| Italy | 2012 | 1 | 0 |
| Italy | 2013 | – | – |
| Italy | 2014 | 1 | 0 |
| Italy | 2015 | 1 | 0 |
| Total | | 7 | 1 |

Scores and results list Italy's goal tally first, score column indicates score after each Matri goal.

List of international goals scored by Alessandro Matri
| No. | Date | Venue | Opponent | Score | Result | Competition |
|---|---|---|---|---|---|---|
| 1 | 29 March 2011 | Lobanovsky Dynamo Stadium, Kyiv, Ukraine | Ukraine | 2–0 | 2–0 | Friendly |

== Honours ==
Juventus

- Serie A: 2011–12, 2012–13, 2014–15
- Coppa Italia: 2014–15
- Supercoppa Italiana: 2012, 2013
- UEFA Champions League runner-up: 2014–15
