= Bryan Bautista =

Uruguayan footballer (born 1997)

Personal information
- Full name: Bryan Federico Bautista López
- Date of birth: 29 January 1997 (age 29)
- Place of birth: Montevideo, Uruguay
- Height: 1.71 m (5 ft 7 in)
- Position: Midfielder

Youth career
- –2015: Rentistas

Senior career*
Years	Team	Apps	(Gls)
2015–2021	Rentistas	20	(0)
2017	→ Bella Vista (loan)	14	(0)
2021	→ Rampla Juniors (loan)	1	(0)
2021	→ Uruguay Montevideo (loan)	4	(0)
2022	Miramar Misiones	2	(0)
2023	Basáñez		
- * Club domestic league appearances and goals as of 26 June 2022

Bryan Federico Bautista López (born 29 January 1997) is a Uruguayan footballer who plays as a midfielder.

== Career ==
=== Rentistas ===
A product of the club's youth academy, Bautista made his league debut for the club on 17 September 2016, coming on as an 80th minute substitute for Richard Dorrego in a 1-1 draw with Cerro Largo.
