= Alfred Duncan =

Ghanaian footballer (born 1993)

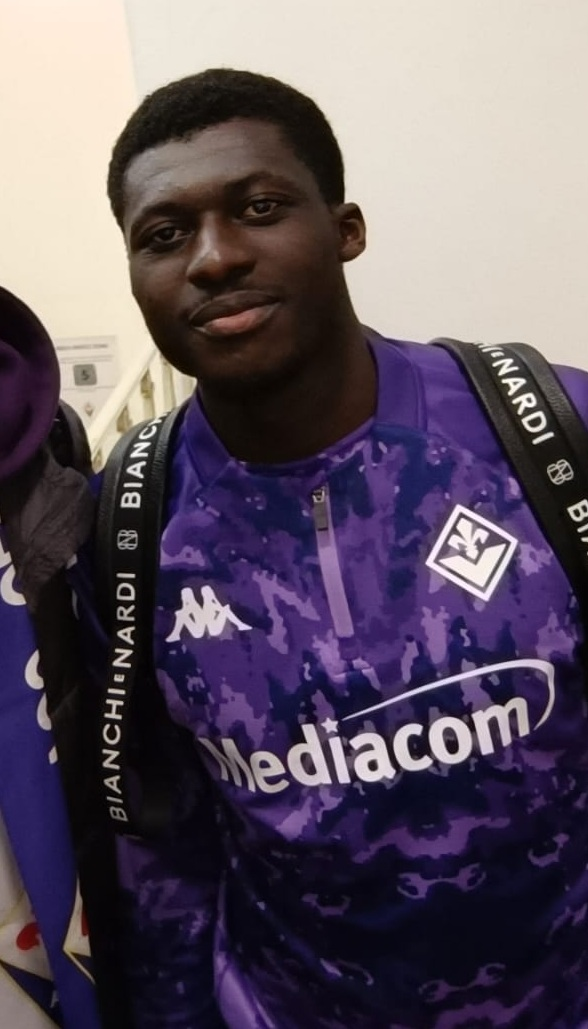
- Duncan in 2024

Personal information
- Full name: Joseph Alfred Duncan
- Date of birth: 10 March 1993 (age 33)
- Place of birth: Accra, Ghana
- Height: 1.78 m (5 ft 10 in)
- Position: Defensive midfielder

Team information
- Current team: Venezia
- Number: 32

Youth career
- 2010–2012: Inter Milan

Senior career*
Years	Team	Apps	(Gls)
2012–2014	Inter Milan	3	(0)
2012–2014	→ Livorno (loan)	51	(1)
2014–2016	Sampdoria	26	(1)
2015–2016	→ Sassuolo (loan)	33	(1)
2016–2020	Sassuolo	76	(6)
2020	→ Fiorentina (loan)	13	(1)
2020–2024	Fiorentina	92	(5)
2021	→ Cagliari (loan)	19	(0)
2024–	Venezia	33	(1)

International career^{‡}
2013	Ghana U20	4	(2)
2012–2017	Ghana	10	(0)
- * Club domestic league appearances and goals as of 12 May 2026 ‡ National team caps and goals as of 29 March 2021

Joseph Alfred Duncan (born 10 March 1993) is a Ghanaian professional footballer who plays as a defensive midfielder for Serie A club Venezia.

== Club career ==
=== Inter Milan ===
Duncan began training with Inter Milan in the summer 2010. But due to FIFA regulations, he formally joined Inter in March 2011, after his 18th birthday. During that time, he lived in Inter training centre "Centro Sportivo Giacinto Facchetti" in Milan. Duncan made his Serie A debut for Inter in August 2012.

=== Sampdoria ===
On 19 July 2014, Duncan joined fellow Serie A side Sampdoria from Inter Milan for two seasons, until 30 June 2016. Duncan moved permanently in January 2015 with Sampdoria paying a transfer fee of about €3 million and Duncan signing a 4 1/2-year contract.

=== Sassuolo ===
On 23 July 2015, Duncan was signed by Sassuolo on a temporary deal, with an obligation to sign him outright at the end of season from Sampdoria, for about €6 million. On 6 March 2016, Duncan scored his first goal for the club against AC Milan in a 2–0 win.

=== Fiorentina ===
On 31 January 2020, Duncan joined Fiorentina on loan with an obligation to buy.

==== Loan to Cagliari ====
On 17 January 2021, Duncan joined Cagliari on loan until 30 June 2021 with an option to buy.

=== Venezia ===
On 27 July 2024, following the end of his contract with Fiorentina, Duncan joined newly promoted Serie A club Venezia on a two-year contract.

== International career ==
Duncan represented Ghana at the 2013 FIFA U-20 World Cup in Turkey playing four games during it. He made his full international debut on 14 November 2012 against Cape Verde.

== Career statistics ==
=== Club ===
As of match played 20 April 2025

Appearances and goals by club, season and competition
Club	Season	League			Coppa Italia		Europe		Other		Total	
Club	Season	Division	Apps	Goals	Apps	Goals	Apps	Goals	Apps	Goals	Apps	Goals
Inter Milan	2012–13	Serie A	3	0	1	0	—		—		4	0
Livorno (loan)	2012–13	Serie B	19	1	0	0	—		4 (Note: Appearances in Serie B play-offs)	1	23	2
Livorno (loan)	2013–14	Serie A	32	0	0	0	—		—		32	0
Livorno (loan)	Total		51	1	0	0	0	0	4	1	55	2
Sampdoria	2014–15	Serie A	26	1	1	0	—		—		27	1
Sassuolo	2015–16	Serie A	33	1	2	0	—		—		35	1
Sassuolo	2016–17	Serie A	21	1	1	0	5 (Note: Appearances in UEFA Europa League)	0	—		27	1
Sassuolo	2017–18	Serie A	26	0	0	0	—		—		26	0
Sassuolo	2018–19	Serie A	26	4	2	1	—		—		28	5
Sassuolo	2019–20	Serie A	13	1	1	0	—		—		14	1
Sassuolo	Total		109	7	6	1	5	0	0	0	120	8
Fiorentina (loan)	2019–20	Serie A	13	1	0	0	—		—		13	1
Fiorentina	2020–21	Serie A	4	0	1	0	—		—		5	0
Fiorentina	2021–22	Serie A	33	2	4	0	—		—		37	2
Fiorentina	2022–23	Serie A	25	1	2	0	3 (Note: Appearances in UEFA Europa Conference League)	0	—		30	1
Fiorentina	2023–24	Serie A	30	2	2	0	8	0	1 (Note: Appearance in Supercoppa Italiana)	0	41	2
Fiorentina	Total		105	6	9	0	11	0	1	0	126	6
Cagliari (loan)	2020–21	Serie A	19	0	—		—		—		19	0
Venezia (loan)	2024–25	Serie A	16	0	1	0	—		—		17	0
Career total			339	15	18	1	16	0	5	1	378	17

=== International ===
Appearances and goals by national team and year
National team	Year	Apps	Goals
Ghana	2012	1	0
Total		1	0

== Honours ==
Inter Primavera

- Campionato Nazionale Primavera: 2011–12
- NextGen series: 2011–12

Livorno

- Serie B play-offs: 2013

Fiorentina

- Coppa Italia runner-up: 2022–23
- UEFA Europa Conference League runner-up: 2022–23

Ghana U20

- FIFA U-20 World Cup bronze medal: 2013
