= Gianluca Pegolo =

Italian ex footballer (born 1981)

Personal information
- Date of birth: 25 March 1981 (age 45)
- Place of birth: Bassano del Grappa, Italy
- Height: 1.84 m (6 ft 0 in)
- Position: Goalkeeper

Youth career
- Hellas Verona

Senior career*
Years	Team	Apps	(Gls)
2000–2001	Fiorenzuola	34	(0)
2001–2007	Hellas Verona	186	(0)
2007–2009	Genoa	0	(0)
2007–2008	→ Mantova (loan)	26	(0)
2008–2009	→ Parma (loan)	4	(0)
2009–2013	Siena	61	(0)
2013–2024	Sassuolo	50	(0)
Total		361	(0)

International career
2002–2003	Italy U21	3	(0)
- * Club domestic league appearances and goals

Gianluca Pegolo (born 25 March 1981) is an Italian professional footballer who plays as a goalkeeper.

== Career ==
=== Early career ===
Pegolo was born in Bassano del Grappa. He joined Genoa on 6 July 2007 on free transfer. He left for Mantova on 31 August 2007 and then another Serie B club Parma in August 2008, joining Julio César de León and Alessandro Lucarelli. Pegolo was the backup keeper of Nicola Pavarini.

=== Siena ===
On 29 June 2009, Pegolo joined Siena for €1 million. On the same day Genoa also signed Houssine Kharja for €6.5 million. Siena also signed the remain 50% registration rights of Manuel Coppola on 26 June for another €1.5 million. He was the backup keeper of Ferdinando Coppola (Željko Brkić in 2011–12 season)

== Career statistics ==
=== Club ===
Appearances and goals by club, season and competition
Club	Season	League			Cup		Europe		Other		Total	
Club	Season	Division	Apps	Goals	Apps	Goals	Apps	Goals	Apps	Goals	Apps	Goals
Fiorenzuola	2000–01	Serie C2	34	0	—		—		2	0	36	0
Hellas Verona	2001–02	Serie A	1	0	0	0	—		—		1	0
Hellas Verona	2002–03	Serie B	37	0	2	0	—		—		39	0
Hellas Verona	2003–04	Serie B	31	0	1	0	—		—		32	0
Hellas Verona	2004–05	Serie B	37	0	2	0	—		—		39	0
Hellas Verona	2005–06	Serie B	39	0	2	0	—		—		41	0
Hellas Verona	2006–07	Serie B	41	0	2	0	—		2	0	45	0
Hellas Verona	Total		186	0	9	0	—		2	0	197	0
Mantova (loan)	2007–08	Serie B	26	0	0	0	—		—		26	0
Parma (loan)	2008–09	Serie B	4	0	0	0	—		—		4	0
Siena	2009–10	Serie A	4	0	1	0	—		—		5	0
Siena	2010–11	Serie B	0	0	0	0	—		—		0	0
Siena	2011–12	Serie A	19	0	2	0	—		—		21	0
Siena	2012–13	Serie A	38	0	1	0	—		—		39	0
Siena	Total		61	0	4	0	—		—		65	0
Sassuolo	2013–14	Serie A	33	0	0	0	—		—		33	0
Sassuolo	2014–15	Serie A	0	0	0	0	—		—		0	0
Sassuolo	2015–16	Serie A	2	0	1	0	—		—		3	0
Sassuolo	2016–17	Serie A	1	0	1	0	1	0	—		3	0
Sassuolo	2017–18	Serie A	2	0	2	0	—		—		4	0
Sassuolo	2018–19	Serie A	3	0	2	0	—		—		5	0
Sassuolo	2019–20	Serie A	5	0	0	0	—		—		5	0
Sassuolo	2020–21	Serie A	1	0	1	0	—		—		2	0
Sassuolo	2021–22	Serie A	1	0	2	0	—		—		3	0
Sassuolo	2022–23	Serie A	2	0	0	0	—		—		2	0
Sassuolo	2023–24	Serie A	0	0	0	0	—		—		0	0
Sassuolo	Total		50	0	9	0	1	0	—		60	0
Career total			361	0	22	0	1	0	4	0	388	0
