= Richard Dorrego =

Uruguayan football player (born 1995)

Personal information
- Full name: Richard Andrés Dorrego Coito
- Date of birth: 1 February 1995 (age 31)
- Place of birth: Montevideo, Uruguay
- Height: 1.76 m (5 ft 9 in)
- Position: Midfielder

Team information
- Current team: Cerro Largo
- Number: 22

Senior career*
Years	Team	Apps	(Gls)
2016	Progreso	12	(2)
2016–2018	Rentistas	37	(11)
2018	Plaza Colonia	22	(1)
2019	Villa Española	15	(1)
2020–	Cerro Largo	3	(0)
- * Club domestic league appearances and goals as of 11:24, 16 November 2020 (UTC)

Richard Andrés Dorrego Coito (born 1 February 1995) is a Uruguayan footballer who plays as a midfielder for Cerro Largo in the Uruguayan Primera División.
