= Luca Mazzitelli =

Italian footballer (born 1995)

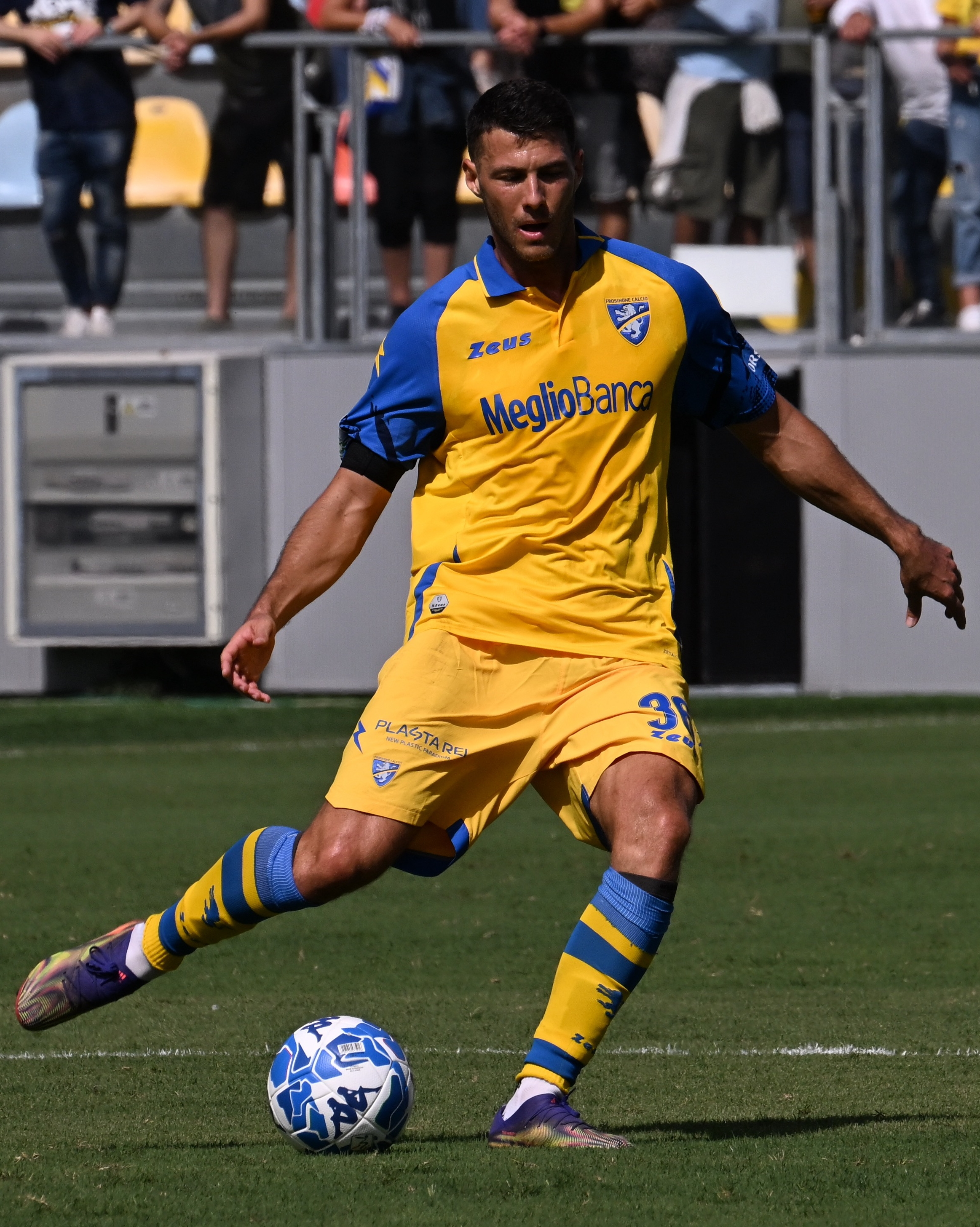
- Mazzitelli with Frosinone in 2022

Personal information
- Date of birth: 15 November 1995 (age 30)
- Place of birth: Rome, Italy
- Height: 1.84 m (6 ft 0 in)
- Position: Central midfielder

Team information
- Current team: Palermo
- Number: 36

Youth career
- Roma

Senior career*
Years	Team	Apps	(Gls)
2014–2016	Roma	1	(0)
2014–2015	→ Südtirol (loan)	24	(1)
2015–2016	→ Brescia (loan)	36	(5)
2016–2021	Sassuolo	38	(1)
2018–2019	→ Genoa (loan)	10	(0)
2020	→ Virtus Entella (loan)	18	(3)
2020–2021	→ Pisa (loan)	34	(5)
2021–2023	Monza	28	(2)
2022–2023	→ Frosinone (loan)	25	(3)
2023–2025	Frosinone	29	(5)
2024–2025	→ Como (loan)	11	(1)
2025	→ Sassuolo (loan)	7	(0)
2025–2026	Como	0	(0)
2025–2026	→ Cagliari (loan)	18	(2)
2026–	Palermo	0	(0)

International career
2012	Italy U17	2	(0)
2015–2016	Italy U20	5	(0)
2016	Italy U21	7	(0)
- * Club domestic league appearances and goals as of 21 July 2026

Luca Mazzitelli (born 15 November 1995) is an Italian professional footballer who plays as a central midfielder for Serie B club Palermo.

== Club career ==
=== Roma and loans ===
Mazzitelli is a youth exponent from Roma. He made his Serie A debut on 18 May 2014 in a 1-0 away defeat against Genoa.

On 10 July 2015, Mazzitelli was loaned out from Roma to Brescia in search of more playing time. Mazzitelli experience with Brescia was successful due to him being the first choice Central Midfield from the beginning of the season. He then was able to put on great displays on the pitch and gained attention from clubs in the first division.

=== Sassuolo and loans ===
On 1 February 2016, Sassuolo confirmed the permanent signing of Mazzitelli from Roma for €3.5 million; the player will however remain on loan with Brescia until 30 June 2016.

On 17 May 2016, Sassuolo DS Giovanni Carnevali confirmed that Luca Mazzitelli will be part of Sassuolo first team squad for the 2016-17 season.

On 6 July 2018, Mazzitelli signed with Genoa until 30 June 2019 a loan with an obligation to buy.

On 15 January 2020, he joined Serie B club Virtus Entella on loan until the end of 2019–20 season. If certain conditions were met, Entella would be obligated to purchase his rights at the end of the loan.

On 25 September 2020, he moved to Serie B club Pisa on loan with an obligation to buy.

=== Monza ===
On 9 July 2021, joined fellow-Serie B side Monza on a four-year contract. He made his debut on 11 September, in a 1–1 league draw against SPAL. On 28 October, Mazzitelli scored his first goal for Monza in a 1–1 away draw to Vicenza.

=== Frosinone ===
On 23 August 2022, Mazzitelli was sent on a one-year loan to Frosinone, with conditional obligation for purchase. On 3 February 2025, he returned to Sassuolo on loan.

=== Como ===
On 26 July 2024, Mazzitelli joined Como on loan with an obligation to buy. he signed a contract until 2027.

==== Loan to Cagliari ====
On 30 July 2025, Mazzitelli was loaned from Como by Cagliari, with an option to buy.

== International career ==
On 24 March 2016, he made his debut with the Italy U21 team, in a qualification match against Republic of Ireland.

== Career statistics ==
=== Club ===
As of match played 31 January 2026

Appearances and goals by club, season and competition
Club	Season	League			Coppa Italia		Continental		Other		Total	
Club	Season	Division	Apps	Goals	Apps	Goals	Apps	Goals	Apps	Goals	Apps	Goals
Roma	2013–14	Serie A	1	0	0	0	—		—		1	0
Roma	2014–15	Serie A	—		—		—		—		0	0
Roma	2015–16	Serie A	—		—		—		—		0	0
Roma	Total		1	0	0	0	0	0	0	0	0	0
Südtirol (loan)	2014–15	Lega Pro	24	1	2	0	—		—		26	1
Brescia (loan)	2015–16	Serie B	36	5	2	0	—		—		38	5
Sassuolo	2016–17	Serie A	17	1	1	0	5 (Note: Appearances in UEFA Europa League)	0	—		23	1
Sassuolo	2017–18	Serie A	20	0	3	0	—		—		23	0
Sassuolo	2018–19	Serie A	—		—		—		—		0	0
Sassuolo	2019–20	Serie A	1	0	1	0	—		—		2	0
Sassuolo	2020–21	Serie A	—		—		—		—		0	0
Sassuolo	Total		38	1	5	0	5	0	0	0	48	1
Genoa (loan)	2018–19	Serie A	10	0	1	0	—		—		11	0
Virtus Entella (loan)	2019–20	Serie B	18	3	0	0	—		—		18	3
Pisa (loan)	2020–21	Serie B	34	5	2	0	—		—		36	5
Monza	2021–22	Serie B	28	2	0	0	—		3 (Note: Appearances in play-offs)	0	31	2
Frosinone (loan)	2022–23	Serie B	25	3	0	0	—		—		25	3
Frosinone	2023–24	Serie A	29	5	3	0	—		—		32	5
Frosinone	Total		54	8	3	0	0	0	0	0	57	8
Como	2024–25	Serie A	11	1	1	0	—		—		12	1
Sassuolo (loan)	2024–25	Serie B	7	0	0	0	—		—		7	0
Cagliari (loan)	2025–26	Serie A	13	2	2	0	—		—		15	2
Career total			274	28	18	0	5	0	3	0	300	28

== Honours ==
Sassuolo

- Serie B: 2024–25

Individual

- Serie A Goal of the Month: October 2024
