= Cristian Dell'Orco =

Italian footballer (born 1994)

Personal information
- Date of birth: 10 February 1994 (age 32)
- Place of birth: Sant'Angelo Lodigiano, Italy
- Height: 1.83 m (6 ft 0 in)
- Position: Defender

Team information
- Current team: Pergolettese
- Number: 15

Senior career*
Years	Team	Apps	(Gls)
2011–2012	Fiorenzuola	34	(0)
2012–2015	Parma	0	(0)
2013–2014	→ FeralpiSalò (loan)	25	(2)
2014–2015	→ Ascoli (loan)	25	(1)
2015–2021	Sassuolo	20	(0)
2015–2016	→ Novara (loan)	31	(0)
2019	→ Empoli (loan)	12	(1)
2019–2020	→ Lecce (loan)	14	(0)
2020–2021	→ Spezia (loan)	8	(0)
2021–2026	Perugia	95	(0)
2026–	Pergolettese	1	(0)

International career
2013	Italy U19	2	(0)
2013–2014	Italy U20	3	(0)
- * Club domestic league appearances and goals as of 22 August 2026

Cristian Dell'Orco (born 10 February 1994) is an Italian professional footballer who plays for Serie C Group A club Pergolettese as a defender.

== Career ==
Born in Sant'Angelo Lodigiano, Lombardy region, Dell'Orco started his senior career at Serie D club Fiorenzuola, in Emilia region. In the 2012–13 season, he returned to youth football for Parma's reserve team. On 30 June 2013, Dell'Orco was signed by FeralpiSalò on a temporary deal. On 20 June 2014, he was signed by Ascoli on another temporary deal. During that season, he helped his side to promotion to Serie B. He had a contract with Parma which would last until 30 June 2019. However, he became a free agent on 25 June 2015, after the bankruptcy of Parma.

On 28 July 2015, Dell'Orco was signed by Sassuolo on a free transfer on a five-year contract. He wore no.39 shirt for the team. On 31 August he was signed by Serie B club Novara in a temporary deal.

On 31 January 2019, Dell'Orco joined Empoli on loan until 30 June 2019.

On 9 August 2019, he joined Serie A club Lecce on loan with an option to buy.

On 11 September 2020, Dell'Orco joined Spezia on loan until 30 June 2021.

On 16 July 2021 he moved to Perugia on a three-year contract.

== International career ==
In November 2015, he was called up by Luigi Di Biagio to the national under-21 team to replace the injured Nicola Murru, however failing to make his debut with the Azzurrini.

On 9 April 2017, he received his first call-up to the senior national team, during the third seasonal training camp for emerging footballers in Coverciano.

== Honors ==
Ascoli

- Serie C: 2014–15 Group B
