= Rogério (footballer, born 1998) =

Brazilian footballer (born 1998)

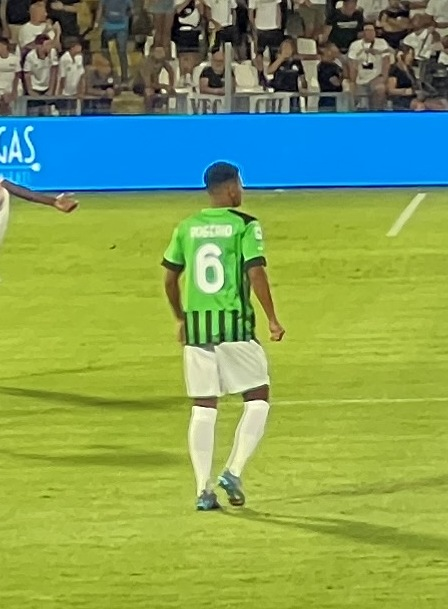
- Rogério in 2022 playing for Sassuolo

Personal information
- Full name: Rogério Oliveira da Silva
- Date of birth: 13 January 1998 (age 28)
- Place of birth: Nobres, Brazil
- Height: 1.78 m (5 ft 10 in)
- Position: Left-back

Team information
- Current team: Wolfsburg
- Number: 13

Youth career
- –2016: Internacional
- 2016: Sassuolo
- 2016–2017: Juventus

Senior career*
Years	Team	Apps	(Gls)
2017–2019	Juventus	0	(0)
2017–2019	→ Sassuolo (loan)	46	(1)
2019–2023	Sassuolo	102	(1)
2023–	Wolfsburg	13	(1)

International career^{‡}
2015	Brazil U17	5	(0)
2017	Brazil U20	4	(0)
2019	Brazil U23	1	(0)
- * Club domestic league appearances and goals as of 21 May 2024 ‡ National team caps and goals as of 22:37, 2 July 2021 (UTC)

Rogério Oliveira da Silva (born 13 January 1998), known as Rogério, is a Brazilian professional footballer who plays as a left-back for 2. Bundesliga side Wolfsburg.

== Club career ==
After a season playing for the Primavera team of Juventus, Rogério returned to Sassuolo in August 2017 on a season-long loan deal. On 17 July 2018, Rogério was loaned out to Sassuolo once again, this time with an option to buy. The deal was turned permanent at the end of the 2018–19 season.

In the summer of 2023, he negotiated with Spartak Moscow, but Sassuolo did not let him go to Russia. The club's management said that despite the "serious offer" of 8 million euros, the club would not deal with the Russians for ethical reasons.

On 5 August 2023, Rogério signed a four-year contract with Wolfsburg in Germany.

== Career statistics ==
=== Club ===
As of match played 16 March 2024

Appearances and goals by club, season and competition
Club	Season	League			Cup		Continental		Other		Total	
Club	Season	Division	Apps	Goals	Apps	Goals	Apps	Goals	Apps	Goals	Apps	Goals
Juventus	2017–18	Serie A	0	0	0	0	0	0	–		0	0
Sassuolo (loan)	2017–18	Serie A	13	0	1 (Note: Appearances in the Coppa Italia)	0	–		–		14	0
Sassuolo (loan)	2018–19	Serie A	33	1	2	0	–		–		35	1
Sassuolo	2019–20	Serie A	15	1	2	0	–		–		17	1
Sassuolo	2020–21	Serie A	28	0	1	0	–		–		29	0
Sassuolo	2021–22	Serie A	23	0	1	0	–		–		24	0
Sassuolo	2022–23	Serie A	36	0	1	0	–		–		37	0
Sassuolo	Total		148	2	8	0	0	0	0	0	156	2
Wolfsburg	2023–24	Bundesliga	13	1	2	0	–		–		15	1
Wolfsburg	2025–26	Bundesliga	0	0	0	0	–		–		0	0
Wolfsburg	Total		13	1	2	0	–		–		15	1
Career total			161	3	10	0	0	0	0	0	171	3
