= Claud Adjapong =

Italian association football player (born 1998)

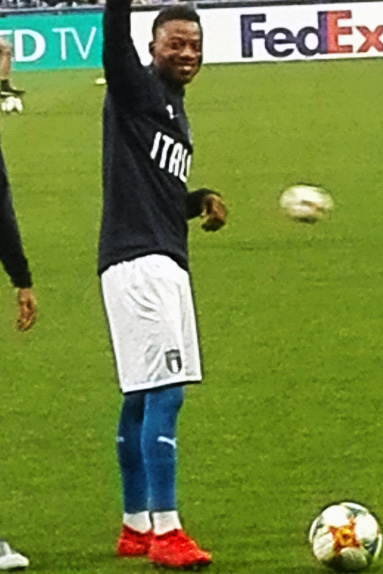
- Adjapong with Italy U21 in 2019

Personal information
- Date of birth: 6 May 1998 (age 28)
- Place of birth: Modena, Italy
- Height: 1.80 m (5 ft 11 in)
- Position: Right-back

Team information
- Current team: Potenza
- Number: 98

Youth career
- 2013–2017: Sassuolo

Senior career*
Years	Team	Apps	(Gls)
2016–2022	Sassuolo	32	(2)
2019–2020	→ Verona (loan)	5	(0)
2020–2021	→ Lecce (loan)	19	(1)
2021–2022	→ Reggina (loan)	20	(0)
2022–2025	Ascoli	59	(1)
2025–	Potenza	24	(3)

International career^{‡}
2016–2017	Italy U19	11	(0)
2017–2020	Italy U21	21	(0)
- * Club domestic league appearances and goals as of 1 May 2026 ‡ National team caps and goals as of 8 September 2020

Claud Adjapong (born 6 May 1998) is an Italian professional footballer who plays as a right-back for Serie C Group C club Potenza.

== Club career ==
=== Sassuolo ===
Adjapong is a youth exponent from Sassuolo. He made his Serie A debut on 11 March 2016 against Juventus. He replaced Matteo Politano after 89 minutes in a 1–0 away defeat.

==== Loan to Hellas Verona ====
On 21 August 2019, Adjapong joined Serie A club Verona on loan with an option to buy.

==== Loan to Reggina ====
On 9 August 2021, he moved to Serie B side Reggina on a season-long loan.

=== Ascoli ===
On 1 September 2022, Adjapong signed a three-year contract with Ascoli.

== International career ==
Adjapong was born and raised in Italy to parents of Ghanaian descent. Until he was 18, he only had a Ghanaian passport. He is eligible to play for the Ghana national team.

After receiving his passport, on 25 August 2016, he received a call-up from the Italy-U19. He made his debut with the Italy-U21 team on 1 September 2017, in a friendly match lost 3–0 against Spain.

== Career statistics ==
As of match played 5 April 2021

Club	Season	League	League		Cup		Europe		Other		Total	
Club	Season	League	Apps	Goals	Apps	Goals	Apps	Goals	Apps	Goals	Apps	Goals
Sassuolo	2015–16	Serie A	2	0	–		–		–		2	0
Sassuolo	2016–17	Serie A	9	1	1	0	3	0	–		13	1
Sassuolo	2017–18	Serie A	16	0	0	0	–		–		16	0
Sassuolo	2018–19	Serie A	5	1	0	0	–		–		5	1
Sassuolo	Total		32	2	1	0	3	0	0	0	36	2
Verona (loan)	2019–20	Serie A	5	0	0	0	–		–		5	0
Lecce (loan)	2020–21	Serie B	19	1	2	0	–		–		21	1
Career total			56	3	3	0	3	0	0	0	62	3
