= Edoardo Goldaniga =

Italian footballer (born 1993)

Personal information
- Date of birth: 2 November 1993 (age 33)
- Place of birth: Milan, Italy
- Height: 1.88 m (6 ft 2 in)
- Position: Centre back

Team information
- Current team: Como
- Number: 18

Youth career
- –2010: Pizzighettone

Senior career*
Years	Team	Apps	(Gls)
2010–2012	Pizzighettone	63	(1)
2012–2017	Palermo	45	(4)
2013–2014	→ Pisa (loan)	33	(2)
2014–2015	→ Perugia (loan)	36	(4)
2017–2022	Sassuolo	14	(1)
2018–2019	→ Frosinone (loan)	29	(1)
2019–2021	→ Genoa (loan)	38	(1)
2022–2024	Cagliari	42	(0)
2024–	Como	50	(3)

International career
2013–2014	Italy U20	3	(0)
2014	Italy U21	2	(0)
- * Club domestic league appearances and goals as of 08:07, 19 June 2026 (UTC)

Edoardo Goldaniga (born 2 November 1993) is an Italian professional footballer who plays a defender for Serie A club Como.

== Club career ==
=== Pizzighettone & Palermo ===
Born in Milan, Goldaniga began his career when he was signed by Pizzighettone as a youth. He made his senior debut for the club in a Serie D league match in 2010. After eventually racking up more than 60 appearances for the club, he was subsequently noted by scouts from Serie A club Palermo, who agreed to sign him in July 2012. Initially joining the first team's pre-season camp, Goldaniga was then included into the Primavera under-20 squad, where he spent the 2012–13 season.

==== Pisa (loan), Juventus & Perugia (loan) ====
In July 2013 he was loaned out to Lega Pro Prima Divisione club Pisa in order to gain regular first team experience. His impressive performances in the first half of the 2013–14 season won him interest from defending Serie A champions Juventus, who acquired 50% of the player's transfer rights in January 2014 on a co-ownership basis from Palermo (in a cashless swap with Eric Lanini). He remained with Pisa for the entirety of the 2013–14 Lega Pro Prima Divisione helping the team to a 6th-place finish in Group B and a spot in promotion play-off. Goldaniga featured in all 33 matches for the club as a starter, scoring two goals, although Pisa eventually lost out in their hopes for promotion following a 2–1 aggregate defeat to Frosinone in the semi-finals. Upon the conclusion of the loan agreement, Goldaniga returned to Juventus on 30 June 2014, after the club renewal of the co-ownership agreement.

After officially joining Juventus for the first time on 1 July 2014, Goldaniga was instantaneously sent out on a season-long loan deal to newly promoted Serie B side Perugia, who were promoted from the Lega Pro Prima Divisione as Group B champions.

=== Return to Palermo ===
After a great season in Serie B, Goldaniga re-joined Palermo who announced they had resolved co-ownership of the player with Juventus.

=== Sassuolo ===
He, along with Palermo goalkeeper Leonardo Marson, signed for Sassuolo on 29 July 2017.

==== Loan to Frosinone ====
On 15 July 2018, Goldaniga signed with Frosinone on loan until 30 June 2019.

==== Loan to Genoa ====
On 2 September 2019, he joined Genoa on a season-long loan with option to buy. On 16 September 2020, the loan was renewed for an additional season.

=== Cagliari ===
On 12 January 2022, he signed a two-and-a-half-year contract with Cagliari.

=== Como ===
On 28 January 2024, Goldaniga joined Serie B club Como on a two-and-a-half-year deal.

== International career ==
Goldaniga is part of the Italy U21 squad since April 2014, selected by coach Luigi Di Biagio, with whom he made his debut on 4 June 2014 in a friendly match against Montenegro. He has also featured for the Italy U20 squad on three occasions.

== Career statistics ==
As of match played 24 May 2026

Appearances and goals by club, season and competition
Club	Season	League			National Cup		Continental		Other		Total	
Club	Season	Division	Apps	Goals	Apps	Goals	Apps	Goals	Apps	Goals	Apps	Goals
Pisa (loan)	2013–14	Lega Pro	30	1	0	0	—		3	1	33	2
Perugia (loan)	2014–15	Serie B	35	3	2	0	—		1	1	38	4
Palermo	2015–16	Serie A	17	2	0	0	—		—		17	2
Palermo	2016–17	Serie A	28	2	2	0	—		—		30	2
Palermo	Total		45	4	2	0	0	0	0	0	47	4
Sassuolo	2017–18	Serie A	13	1	1	0	—		—		14	1
Frosinone (loan)	2018–19	Serie A	29	1	1	0	—		—		30	1
Genoa (loan)	2019–20	Serie A	13	1	1	0	—		—		14	1
Genoa (loan)	2020–21	Serie A	25	0	2	0	—		—		27	0
Genoa (loan)	Total		38	1	3	0	0	0	0	0	41	1
Sassuolo	2021–22	Serie A	1	0	0	0	—		—		1	0
Cagliari	2021–22	Serie A	11	0	1	0	—		—		12	0
Cagliari	2022–23	Serie B	18	0	1	0	—		4 (Note: Appearances in Serie B playoffs)	0	23	0
Cagliari	2023–24	Serie A	13	0	1	0	—		—		14	0
Cagliari	Total		42	0	3	0	—		—		45	0
Como	2023–24	Serie B	16	2	—		—		—		16	2
Como	2024–25	Serie A	32	1	1	0	—		—		33	1
Como	2025–26	Serie A	2	0	1	0	—		—		3	0
Como	Total		50	3	2	0	—		—		52	3
Career total			283	14	14	0	0	0	8	2	305	16
