= 2017–18 FC Crotone season =

Crotone
2017–18 season
- President: Gianni Vrenna
- Manager: Davide Nicola (until 6 December 2017); Walter Zenga (from 8 December 2017)
- Stadium: Stadio Ezio Scida
- Serie A: 18th (relegated)
- Coppa Italia: Fourth round
- Top goalscorer: League: Marcello Trotta (7); All: Marcello Trotta (8)
- Highest home attendance: 15,021 vs Juventus (18 April 2018, Serie A)
- Lowest home attendance: 4,869 vs Piacenza (12 August 2017, Coppa Italia)
- Average home league attendance: 10,581
Home colours	Away colours	Third colours

The 2017–18 season was Football Club Crotone's second season in Serie A after the club's 17th-place finish the previous season, in which the club sat in the relegation zone for most of the campaign. Crotone competed in Serie A and the Coppa Italia. The club finished 18th in the league, being relegated to Serie B after just two seasons in Serie A, and were eliminated in the fourth round of the Coppa Italia.

== Players ==
=== Squad information ===
As of 6 September 2017.

Note: Flags indicate national team as defined under FIFA eligibility rules; some limited exceptions apply. Players may hold more than one non-FIFA nationality.

No.	Pos.	Nation	Player
1	GK	ITA	Alex Cordaz (captain)
3	GK	ITA	Marco Festa
5	MF	ROU	Adrian Stoian
6	MF	SWE	Marcus Rohdén
7	DF	ITA	Federico Ceccherini
8	MF	VEN	Aristóteles Romero
9	FW	ITA	Andrea Nalini
10	MF	ITA	Andrea Barberis
11	MF	GER	Oliver Kragl
13	MF	ARG	Mariano Julio Izco
14	MF	BIH	Ćazim Suljić
17	FW	CRO	Ante Budimir (on loan from Sampdoria)
20	DF	BIH	Daniel Pavlović
21	DF	ITA	Giuseppe Cuomo
24	MF	BUL	Aleksandar Tonev

No.	Pos.	Nation	Player
28	FW	ITA	Giuseppe Borello
29	FW	ITA	Marcello Trotta (on loan from Sassuolo)
31	DF	ITA	Mario Sampirisi
32	FW	ITA	Marco Tumminello (on loan from Roma)
34	DF	CZE	Stefan Simić (on loan from Milan)
37	DF	ITA	Davide Faraoni
38	MF	ITA	Rolando Mandragora (on loan from Juventus)
44	DF	URU	Leandro Cabrera
47	MF	SVN	Andrej Kotnik
78	GK	ITA	Aniello Viscovo
87	MF	ITA	Bruno Martella
89	MF	ITA	Giovanni Crociata
93	DF	ALB	Arlind Ajeti (on loan from Torino)
99	FW	NGA	Simy

== Transfers ==
=== In ===
Date	Pos.	Player	Age	Moving from	Fee	Notes	Source
23 July 2017	MF	(Argentina) Mariano Julio Izco	34	Unattached	Free		
2 August 2017	MF	(Italy) Giovanni Crociata	19	(Italy) Milan	Undisclosed		

==== Loans in ====
Date	Pos.	Player	Age	Moving from	Fee	Notes	Source
22 July 2017	FW	(Italy) Marcello Trotta	24	(Italy) Sassuolo	Loan	Second consecutive loan with Crotone	
1 August 2017	DF	(Albania) Arlind Ajeti	23	(Italy) Torino	Loan		
5 August 2017	MF	(Italy) Rolando Mandragora	20	(Italy) Juventus	Loan		
31 August 2017	DF	(Bosnia and Herzegovina) Daniel Pavlović	29	(Italy) Sampdoria	Loan		

=== Out ===
Date	Pos.	Player	Age	Moving to	Fee	Notes	Source

==== Loans out ====
Date	Pos.	Player	Age	Moving to	Fee	Notes	Source

== Pre-season and friendlies ==
v

== Competitions ==
=== Serie A ===
==== League table ====
Pos	Team	Pld	W	D	L	GF	GA	GD	Pts	Qualification or relegation
16	Cagliari	38	11	6	21	33	61	−28	39	
17	SPAL	38	8	14	16	39	59	−20	38	
18	Crotone (R)	38	9	8	21	40	66	−26	35	Relegation to Serie B
19	Hellas Verona (R)	38	7	4	27	30	78	−48	25	Relegation to Serie B
20	Benevento (R)	38	6	3	29	33	84	−51	21	Relegation to Serie B

Source: Serie A, Soccerway
Rules for classification: 1) Points; 2) Head-to-head points; 3) Head-to-head goal difference; 4) Goal difference; 5) Goals scored; 6) Draw.
(R) Relegated

==== Results summary ====
Overall								Home						Away					
Pld	W	D	L	GF	GA	GD	Pts	W	D	L	GF	GA	GD	W	D	L	GF	GA	GD
38	9	8	21	40	66	−26	35	6	6	7	23	25	−2	3	2	14	17	41	−24

Last updated: 20 May 2018.
Source: Competitive matches

==== Results by round ====
Round	1	2	3	4	5	6	7	8	9	10	11	12	13	14	15	16	17	18	19	20	21	22	23	24	25	26	27	28	29	30	31	32	33	34	35	36	37	38
Ground	H	H	A	H	A	H	A	H	A	A	H	A	H	A	H	A	H	A	H	A	A	H	A	H	A	H	A	H	H	A	H	A	H	A	H	A	H	A
Result	L	D	L	L	L	W	D	D	L	L	W	W	L	L	L	L	W	L	L	L	W	D	D	D	L	L	L	W	L	L	W	L	D	W	W	L	D	L
Position	19	14	18	18	19	16	16	15	17	17	15	15	15	15	16	17	16	18	18	18	17	17	17	17	17	17	18	16	18	18	18	18	18	16	15	16	18	18

Updated to match(es) played on 20 May 2018. Source: Competitive matches
A = Away; H = Home; W = Win; D = Draw; L = Loss

==== Matches ====
20 August 2017 1	Crotone	0–3	Milan	Crotone
20:45 CEST (UTC+02:00)	Ceccherini (red card) 5'; Dussenne (yellow card) 90'	Report	Kessié 6' (pen.); Cutrone (yellow card) 9', (goal) 18'; Suso 23'; Locatelli (yellow card) 59'; Bonucci (yellow card) 69'	Stadium: Stadio Ezio Scida; Attendance: 13,478; Referee: Maurizio Mariani

27 August 2017 2	Crotone	0–0	Hellas Verona	Crotone
20:45 CEST (UTC+02:00)	Stoian (yellow card) 38'	Report	Büchel (yellow card) 36'; Fares (yellow card) 52'; Bessa (yellow card) 90+3'; Zaccagni (yellow card) 90+3'	Stadium: Stadio Ezio Scida; Attendance: 9,158; Referee: Marco Guida

10 September 2017 3	Cagliari	1–0	Crotone	Cagliari
15:00 CEST (UTC+02:00)	Sau 33'; Cigarini (yellow card) 43'; Padoin (yellow card) 45+1'	Report	Ceccherini (yellow card) 53'	Stadium: Sardegna Arena; Attendance: 14,076; Referee: Daniele Doveri

16 September 2017 4	Crotone	0–2	Internazionale	Crotone
15:00 CEST (UTC+02:00)	Cordaz (yellow card) 83'	Report	Miranda (yellow card) 40'; Škriniar 82'; Candreva (yellow card) 90'; Perišić 90+2'	Stadium: Stadio Ezio Scida; Attendance: 13,422; Referee: Luca Banti

20 September 2017 5	Atalanta	5–1	Crotone	Bergamo
20:45 CEST (UTC+02:00)	Petagna 5'; Caldara 25'; Iličić 38'; Gómez 63', 74' (pen.)	Report	Ajeti (yellow card) 45+2'; Tumminello 70'	Stadium: Stadio Atleti Azzurri d'Italia; Attendance: 16,378; Referee: Marco Piccinini

24 September 2017 6	Crotone	2–0	Benevento	Crotone
15:00 CEST (UTC+02:00)	Mandragora 43'; Rohdén 58'	Report		Stadium: Stadio Ezio Scida; Attendance: 8,827; Referee: Daniele Orsato

1 October 2017 7	SPAL	1–1	Crotone	Ferrara
15:00 CEST (UTC+02:00)	Paloschi 39'; Felipe (yellow card) 84'; Schiattarella (yellow card) 88'	Report	Rohdén (yellow card) 35'; Simy 59'	Stadium: Stadio Paolo Mazza; Attendance: 11,187; Referee: Paolo Mazzoleni

15 October 2017 8	Crotone	2–2	Torino	Crotone
15:00 CEST (UTC+02:00)	Rohdén 25'; Ajeti (yellow card) 52'; Martella 64'	Report	Falque 53'; De Silvestri 90+2'	Stadium: Stadio Ezio Scida; Attendance: 9,563; Referee: Paolo Valeri

21 October 2017 9	Sampdoria	5–0	Crotone	Genoa
18:00 CEST (UTC+02:00)	Ferrari 3'; Quagliarella 11' (pen.); Torreira (yellow card) 25'; Caprari 38'; Linetty 71'; Kownacki 76'	Report	Budimir (yellow card) 6'; Stoian (yellow card) 26'; Mandragora (yellow card) 41'	Stadium: Stadio Luigi Ferraris; Attendance: 18,220; Referee: Gianpaolo Calvarese

25 October 2017 10	Roma	1–0	Crotone	Rome
20:45 CEST (UTC+02:00)	Perotti 10' (pen.)	Report	Budimir (yellow card) 71'	Stadium: Stadio Olimpico; Attendance: 31,605; Referee: Gianluca Manganiello

29 October 2017 11	Crotone	2–1	Fiorentina	Crotone
15:00 CET (UTC+01:00)	Budimir 17', (yellow card) 47'; Trotta 18'; Simić (yellow card) 74'; Cordaz (yellow card) 76'	Report	Astori (yellow card) 39'; Benassi 44'; Chiesa (yellow card) 62'; Babacar (yellow card) 74'	Stadium: Stadio Ezio Scida; Attendance: 8,906; Referee: Fabio Maresca

4 November 2017 12	Bologna	2–3	Crotone	Bologna
18:00 CET (UTC+01:00)	Verdi 38', 45+1'; Krafth (yellow card) 67'; González (yellow card) 84'	Report	Budimir 42', 70', (yellow card) 48'; Sampirisi (yellow card) 44'; Simić (yellow card) 59'; Trotta 68' (pen.)	Stadium: Stadio Renato Dall'Ara; Attendance: 20,146; Referee: Fabrizio Pasqua

19 November 2017 13	Crotone	0–1	Genoa	Crotone
12:30 CET (UTC+01:00)	Stoian (yellow card) 39'	Report	Rigoni 11', (yellow card) 70'; Spolli (yellow card) 33'; Veloso (yellow card) 54'	Stadium: Stadio Ezio Scida; Attendance: 9,106; Referee: Paolo Tagliavento

26 November 2017 14	Juventus	3–0	Crotone	Turin
20:45 CET (UTC+01:00)	Benatia (yellow card) 45+1', (goal) 71'; Matuidi (yellow card) 50'; Mandžukić 52'; De Sciglio 60'	Report	Budimir (yellow card) 32'; Rohdén (yellow card) 85'	Stadium: Allianz Stadium; Attendance: 38,585; Referee: Claudio Gavillucci

4 December 2017 15	Crotone	0–3	Udinese	Crotone
19:00 CET (UTC+01:00)		Report	Jankto 40', 53'; Lasagna 66'	Stadium: Stadio Ezio Scida; Attendance: 8,564; Referee: Davide Massa

10 December 2017 16	Sassuolo	2–1	Crotone	Reggio Emilia
18:00 CET (UTC+01:00)	Berardi (yellow card) 36'; Goldaniga 49'; Politano 61'; Missiroli (yellow card) 72'; Cassata (yellow card) 74'	Report	Ajeti (yellow card) 50'; Acerbi 66' (o.g.); Romero (yellow card) 90+3'	Stadium: Mapei Stadium – Città del Tricolore; Attendance: 8,319; Referee: Gianluca Manganiello

17 December 2017 17	Crotone	1–0	Chievo	Crotone
15:00 CET (UTC+01:00)	Ajeti (yellow card) 12'; Budimir 33'; Barberis (yellow card) 63'; Mandragora (yellow card) 65'; Romero (yellow card) 90+4'	Report	Bastien (yellow card) 41'; Gobbi (yellow card) 61'; Birsa (yellow card) 65'; Dainelli (yellow card) 71'	Stadium: Stadio Ezio Scida; Attendance: 8,799; Referee: Luca Pairetto

23 December 2017 18	Lazio	4–0	Crotone	Rome
12:30 CET (UTC+01:00)	Milinković-Savić (yellow card) 40'; Lukaku 56'; Immobile 78'; Lulić 86'; Felipe Anderson 89'	Report	Ajeti (yellow card) 68'; Budimir (yellow card) 74'	Stadium: Stadio Olimpico; Attendance: 40,000; Referee: Gianpaolo Calvarese

29 December 2017 19	Crotone	0–1	Napoli	Crotone
20:45 CET (UTC+01:00)	Ceccherini (yellow card) 39'	Report	Hamšík 17'; Jorginho (yellow card) 30'; Albiol (yellow card) 51'	Stadium: Stadio Ezio Scida; Attendance: 11,063; Referee: Maurizio Mariani

6 January 2018 20	Milan	1–0	Crotone	Milan
15:00 CET (UTC+01:00)	Biglia (yellow card) 45'; Bonucci 54'; Kalinić (yellow card) 90+4'	Report	Mandragora (yellow card) 20'; Martella (yellow card) 90+3'	Stadium: San Siro; Attendance: 42,533; Referee: Fabio Maresca

21 January 2018 21	Hellas Verona	0–3	Crotone	Verona
15:00 CET (UTC+01:00)	Fares (yellow card) 32'; B. Zuculini (red card) 61'	Report	Barberis 3'; Ricci (yellow card) 17', (goal) 67'; Ceccherini (yellow card) 27'; Martella (yellow card) 28'; Stoian (yellow card) 50', (goal) 54'; Capuano (yellow card) 82'	Stadium: Stadio Marc'Antonio Bentegodi; Attendance: 16,075; Referee: Gianluca Rocchi

28 January 2018 22	Crotone	1–1	Cagliari	Crotone
15:00 CET (UTC+01:00)	Trotta 29' (pen.); Ricci (yellow card) 56'; Ceccherini (yellow card) 62'	Report	Cigarini (yellow card) 19', (goal) 45+7'; Pisacane (red card) 45+2'; Farias (yellow card) 56'	Stadium: Stadio Ezio Scida; Attendance: 8,987; Referee: Paolo Tagliavento

3 February 2018 23	Internazionale	1–1	Crotone	Milan
20:45 CET (UTC+01:00)	Éder 23', (yellow card) 59'	Report	Mandragora (yellow card) 29'; Barberis 60'; Benali (yellow card) 80'; Ricci (yellow card) 89'	Stadium: San Siro; Attendance: 46,807; Referee: Daniele Orsato

10 February 2018 24	Crotone	1–1	Atalanta	Crotone
18:00 CET (UTC+01:00)	Capuano (yellow card) 52'; Budimir (yellow card) 76'; Mandragora 79'; Faraoni (yellow card) 83'; Nalini (yellow card) 90+3'	Report	Palomino (yellow card) 35', (goal) 88'; Toloi (yellow card) 85'	Stadium: Stadio Ezio Scida; Attendance: 8,795; Referee: Davide Massa

18 February 2018 25	Benevento	3–2	Crotone	Benevento
15:00 CET (UTC+01:00)	Coda (yellow card) 25'; Letizia (yellow card) 32'; Sandro 37', (yellow card) 80'; Brignola (yellow card) 58'; Viola 65'; Đuričić (yellow card) 67'; Diabaté 89'	Report	Crociata 11'; Budimir (yellow card) 66'; Benali 73', (yellow card) 75'	Stadium: Stadio Ciro Vigorito; Attendance: 10,163; Referee: Gianluca Rocchi

25 February 2018 26	Crotone	2–3	SPAL	Crotone
12:30 CET (UTC+01:00)	Sampirisi (yellow card) 23'; Budimir 49', 86'	Report	Vicari (yellow card) 30'; Antenucci 37'; Cionek (yellow card) 50'; Šimić 51'; Paloschi 60', (yellow card) 81'; Schiattarella (yellow card) 81'	Stadium: Stadio Ezio Scida; Attendance: 8,658; Referee: Daniele Orsato

11 March 2018 28	Crotone	4–1	Sampdoria	Crotone
15:00 CET (UTC+01:00)	Trotta 6', 36'; Stoian 23'; Viviano 85' (o.g.); Martella (yellow card) 90+2'	Report	Murru (yellow card) 41'; Linetty (yellow card) 65'; Zapata 69'	Stadium: Stadio Ezio Scida; Attendance: 8,738; Referee: Paolo Mazzoleni

18 March 2018 29	Crotone	0–2	Roma	Crotone
15:00 CET (UTC+01:00)		Report	El Shaarawy 39'; Nainggolan 75'	Stadium: Stadio Ezio Scida; Attendance: 11,691; Referee: Luca Banti

31 March 2018 30	Fiorentina	2–0	Crotone	Florence
15:00 CEST (UTC+02:00)	Simeone 3'; Cristóforo (yellow card) 30'; Pezzella (yellow card) 32'; Veretout (yellow card) 43'; Chiesa 62'; Olivera (yellow card) 78'	Report	Ricci (yellow card) 16'; Mandragora (yellow card) 18'; Stoian (yellow card) 18'; Capuano (yellow card) 49' (yellow-red card) 57'	Stadium: Stadio Artemio Franchi; Attendance: 22,710; Referee: Paolo Valeri

4 April 2018 27	Torino	4–1	Crotone	Turin
18:30 CEST (UTC+02:00)	Belotti 16', 36', 68'; Falque 20'; Rincón (yellow card) 66'	Report	Faraoni (yellow card) 36', (goal) 90'	Stadium: Stadio Olimpico Grande Torino; Attendance: 15,760; Referee: Marco Guida
Note: Postponed due to Fiorentina player Davide Astori's death; originally scheduled for 4 March 2018.

8 April 2018 31	Crotone	1–0	Bologna	Crotone
15:00 CEST (UTC+02:00)	Simy 25'; Capuano (yellow card) 48'; Mandragora (yellow card) 74'	Report	Torosidis (yellow card) 42'; Di Francesco (yellow card) 44'; De Maio (yellow card) 86'; Džemaili (yellow card) 86'	Stadium: Stadio Ezio Scida; Attendance: 9,679; Referee: Gianpaolo Calvarese

14 April 2018 32	Genoa	1–0	Crotone	Genoa
18:00 CEST (UTC+02:00)	Medeiros (yellow card) 12'; Bessa 28'; Pereira (yellow card) 90+2'	Report	Ajeti (yellow card) 45+1'; Trotta (yellow card) 46'; Tumminello (yellow card) 86'; Simy (yellow card) 86'	Stadium: Stadio Luigi Ferraris; Attendance: 18,988; Referee: Massimiliano Irrati

18 April 2018 33	Crotone	1–1	Juventus	Crotone
20:45 CEST (UTC+02:00)	Mandragora (yellow card) 36'; Simy 65'	Report	Alex Sandro 16'; Benatia (yellow card) 73'; Lichtsteiner (yellow card) 84'	Stadium: Stadio Ezio Scida; Attendance: 15,021; Referee: Michael Fabbri

22 April 2018 34	Udinese	1–2	Crotone	Udine
15:00 CEST (UTC+02:00)	Lasagna 5'; Behrami (yellow card) 58'; Jankto (yellow card) 68'	Report	Simy 7'; Faraoni 86'	Stadium: Dacia Arena; Attendance: 21,746; Referee: Marco Di Bello

29 April 2018 35	Crotone	4–1	Sassuolo	Crotone
12:30 CEST (UTC+02:00)	Trotta 3', 31', (yellow card) 81'; Simy 16', 89'; Mandragora (yellow card) 44'; Ajeti (yellow card) 85'	Report	Berardi 45+2' (pen.); Lemos (yellow card) 80'	Stadium: Stadio Ezio Scida; Attendance: 13,600; Referee: Antonio Damato

6 May 2018 36	Chievo	2–1	Crotone	Verona
15:00 CEST (UTC+02:00)	Birsa 12'; Radovanović (yellow card) 42'; Rigoni (yellow card) 53'; Hetemaj (yellow card) 61'; Bani (yellow card) 78'; Stępiński 82'; Sorrentino (yellow card) 88'	Report	Faraoni (yellow card) 82'; Tumminello 90+4'	Stadium: Stadio Marc'Antonio Bentegodi; Attendance: 17,258; Referee: Davide Massa

13 May 2018 37	Crotone	2–2	Lazio	Crotone
15:00 CEST (UTC+02:00)	Simy 29'; Nalini (yellow card) 36'; Ceccherini 61'	Report	Lulić 17' (pen.); Radu (yellow card) 20'; Murgia (yellow card) 22'; Nani (yellow card) 69'; Milinković-Savić 84'	Stadium: Stadio Ezio Scida; Attendance: 14,983; Referee: Paolo Mazzoleni

20 May 2018 38	Napoli	2–1	Crotone	Naples
18:00 CEST (UTC+02:00)	Milik 23'; Callejón 32'	Report	Tumminello 90'	Stadium: Stadio San Paolo; Attendance: 51,382; Referee: Luca Banti

=== Coppa Italia ===
12 August 2017 Third round	Crotone	2–1	Piacenza	Crotone
20:45 CEST (UTC+02:00)	Budimir 25'; Trotta 83'	Report	Bini 62'	Stadium: Stadio Ezio Scida; Attendance: 4,869; Referee: Riccardo Pinzani

30 November 2017 Fourth round	Genoa	1–0	Crotone	Genoa
21:00 CET (UTC+01:00)	Migliore 54'; Cofie (yellow card) 83'	Report	Simić (yellow card) 16'; Martella (yellow card) 57'; Suljić (yellow card) 66'	Stadium: Stadio Luigi Ferraris; Attendance: 4,149; Referee: Gianluca Manganiello

== Statistics ==
=== Appearances and goals ===
No.	Pos	Nat	Player	Total		Serie A		Coppa Italia	
No.	Pos	Nat	Player	Apps	Goals	Apps	Goals	Apps	Goals
Goalkeepers
1	GK	(Italy) ITA	Alex Cordaz	39	0	38	0	1	0
3	GK	(Italy) ITA	Marco Festa	1	0	0	0	1	0
33	GK	(Italy) ITA	Aniello Viscovo	0	0	0	0	0	0
Defenders
7	DF	(Italy) ITA	Federico Ceccherini	38	1	37	1	1	0
20	DF	(Bosnia and Herzegovina) BIH	Daniel Pavlović	10	0	8+2	0	0	0
23	DF	(Italy) ITA	Marco Capuano	16	0	16	0	0	0
31	DF	(Italy) ITA	Mario Sampirisi	31	0	24+7	0	0	0
34	DF	(Czech Republic) CZE	Stefan Simić	10	0	6+3	0	1	0
37	DF	(Italy) ITA	Davide Faraoni	30	2	18+10	2	2	0
87	DF	(Italy) ITA	Bruno Martella	32	1	30	1	2	0
93	DF	(Albania) ALB	Arlind Ajeti	23	0	15+6	0	1+1	0
Midfielders
5	MF	(Romania) ROU	Adrian Stoian	34	2	26+6	2	2	0
6	MF	(Sweden) SWE	Marcus Rohdén	28	2	20+6	2	1+1	0
10	MF	(Italy) ITA	Andrea Barberis	39	2	34+4	2	1	0
13	MF	(Argentina) ARG	Mariano Julio Izco	6	0	2+3	0	1	0
19	MF	(France) FRA	Moussa Diaby	2	0	1+1	0	0	0
21	MF	(Italy) ITA	Niccolò Zanellato	1	0	0+1	0	0	0
38	MF	(Italy) ITA	Rolando Mandragora	37	2	36	2	0+1	0
89	MF	(Italy) ITA	Giovanni Crociata	12	1	2+9	1	1	0
92	MF	(Libya) LBY	Ahmad Benali	10	1	10	1	0	0
Forwards
9	FW	(Italy) ITA	Andrea Nalini	23	0	19+4	0	0	0
11	FW	(Italy) ITA	Federico Ricci	15	1	10+5	1	0	0
17	FW	(Croatia) CRO	Ante Budimir	24	7	17+5	6	2	1
29	FW	(Italy) ITA	Marcello Trotta	35	8	27+7	7	0+1	1
32	FW	(Italy) ITA	Marco Tumminello	9	3	2+7	3	0	0
99	FW	(Nigeria) NGA	Simy	24	7	11+12	7	0+1	0
Players transferred out during the season
8	MF	(Venezuela) VEN	Aristóteles Romero	7	0	0+6	0	1	0
11	MF	(Germany) GER	Oliver Kragl	5	0	0+5	0	0	0
14	MF	(Bosnia and Herzegovina) BIH	Ćazim Suljić	1	0	0	0	1	0
24	FW	(Bulgaria) BUL	Aleksandar Tonev	10	0	5+3	0	1+1	0
33	DF	(Belgium) BEL	Noë Dussenne	1	0	0+1	0	0	0
44	DF	(Uruguay) URU	Leandro Cabrera	7	0	4+1	0	2	0

Last updated: 20 May 2018
Source: Competitions

=== Goalscorers ===
Rank	No.	Pos	Nat	Name	Serie A	Coppa Italia	Total
1	29	FW	(Italy)	Marcello Trotta	7	1	8
2	17	FW	(Croatia)	Ante Budimir	6	1	7
2	99	FW	(Nigeria)	Simy	7	0	7
4	32	FW	(Italy)	Marco Tumminello	3	0	3
5	5	MF	(Romania)	Adrian Stoian	2	0	2
5	6	MF	(Sweden)	Marcus Rohdén	2	0	2
5	10	MF	(Italy)	Andrea Barberis	2	0	2
5	37	DF	(Italy)	Davide Faraoni	2	0	2
5	38	MF	(Italy)	Rolando Mandragora	2	0	2
10	7	DF	(Italy)	Federico Ceccherini	1	0	1
10	11	FW	(Italy)	Federico Ricci	1	0	1
10	87	DF	(Italy)	Bruno Martella	1	0	1
10	89	MF	(Italy)	Giovanni Crociata	1	0	1
10	92	MF	(Libya)	Ahmad Benali	1	0	1
Own goal					2	0	2
Totals					40	2	42

Last updated: 20 May 2018

=== Clean sheets ===
Rank	No.	Pos	Nat	Name	Serie A	Coppa Italia	Total
1	1	GK	(Italy)	Alex Cordaz	5	0	5
Totals					5	0	5

Last updated: 20 May 2018

=== Disciplinary record ===
No.	Pos	Nat	Name	Serie A			Coppa Italia			Total		
No.	Pos	Nat	Name	Booked	(yellow card) (yellow-red card)	Sent off (straight red)	Booked	(yellow card) (yellow-red card)	Sent off (straight red)	Booked	(yellow card) (yellow-red card)	Sent off (straight red)
1	GK	(Italy)	Alex Cordaz	2	0	0	0	0	0	2	0	0
7	DF	(Italy)	Federico Ceccherini	4	0	1	0	0	0	4	0	1
23	DF	(Italy)	Marco Capuano	3	1	0	0	0	0	3	1	0
31	DF	(Italy)	Mario Sampirisi	2	0	0	0	0	0	2	0	0
33	DF	(Belgium)	Noë Dussenne	1	0	0	0	0	0	1	0	0
34	DF	(Czech Republic)	Stefan Simić	2	0	0	1	0	0	3	0	0
37	DF	(Italy)	Davide Faraoni	3	0	0	0	0	0	3	0	0
87	DF	(Italy)	Bruno Martella	3	0	0	1	0	0	4	0	0
93	DF	(Albania)	Arlind Ajeti	7	0	0	0	0	0	7	0	0
5	MF	(Romania)	Adrian Stoian	5	0	0	0	0	0	5	0	0
6	MF	(Sweden)	Marcus Rohdén	2	0	0	0	0	0	2	0	0
8	MF	(Venezuela)	Aristóteles Romero	2	0	0	0	0	0	2	0	0
10	MF	(Italy)	Andrea Barberis	1	0	0	0	0	0	1	0	0
14	MF	(Bosnia and Herzegovina)	Ćazim Suljić	0	0	0	1	0	0	1	0	0
38	MF	(Italy)	Rolando Mandragora	8	0	0	0	0	0	8	0	0
92	MF	(Libya)	Ahmad Benali	2	0	0	0	0	0	2	0	0
9	FW	(Italy)	Andrea Nalini	2	0	0	0	0	0	2	0	0
11	FW	(Italy)	Federico Ricci	4	0	0	0	0	0	4	0	0
17	FW	(Croatia)	Ante Budimir	8	0	0	0	0	0	8	0	0
29	FW	(Italy)	Marcello Trotta	2	0	0	0	0	0	2	0	0
32	FW	(Italy)	Marco Tumminello	1	0	0	0	0	0	1	0	0
99	FW	(Nigeria)	Simy	1	0	0	0	0	0	1	0	0
Totals				65	1	1	3	0	0	68	1	1

Last updated: 20 May 2018
