= 2016–17 FC Crotone season =

Crotone
2016–17 season
- President: Raffaele Vrenna
- Manager: Davide Nicola
- Stadium: Stadio Ezio Scida
- Serie A: 17th
- Coppa Italia: Third round
- Top goalscorer: League: Diego Falcinelli (13); All: Diego Falcinelli (13)
- Highest home attendance: 15,354 vs Juventus (8 February 2017, Serie A)
- Lowest home attendance: 7,298 vs Chievo (30 October 2016, Serie A)
- Average home league attendance: 9,636
Home colours	Away colours	Third colours

The 2016–17 season was Football Club Crotone's first ever season in Serie A. The club competed in the two Italian domestic competitions, finishing 17th in the league while being eliminated in the third round of the Coppa Italia. Crotone miraculously avoided relegation on the final day of the season, defeating Lazio 3–1 while already-relegated U.S. Città di Palermo secured a 2–1 victory over Empoli which doomed the Tuscan side to Serie B.

== Players ==
=== Squad information ===
As of 6 September 2016

Note: Flags indicate national team as defined under FIFA eligibility rules; some limited exceptions apply. Players may hold more than one non-FIFA nationality.

No.	Pos.	Nation	Player
1	GK	ITA	Alex Cordaz
3	DF	BRA	Claiton
5	GK	ITA	Marco Festa
6	MF	SWE	Marcus Rohdén
7	FW	ITA	Raffaele Palladino
8	MF	ITA	Lorenzo Crisetig (on loan from Bologna)
9	FW	ITA	Andrea Nalini
10	MF	ITA	Pietro De Giorgio
11	FW	ITA	Diego Falcinelli (on loan from Sassuolo)
12	MF	ROU	Adrian Stoian
13	DF	ITA	Gian Marco Ferrari
14	MF	FRA	Eddy Gnahoré (on loan from Napoli)
17	DF	ITA	Federico Ceccherini
18	MF	ITA	Andrea Barberis
20	MF	ITA	Aniello Salzano

No.	Pos.	Nation	Player
21	DF	ALG	Djamel Mesbah
22	DF	ITA	Aleandro Rosi
23	DF	BEL	Noë Dussenne
24	FW	BUL	Aleksandar Tonev
28	MF	ITA	Leonardo Capezzi
29	FW	ITA	Marcello Trotta (on loan from Sassuolo)
30	DF	ITA	Luca Bruno
31	DF	ITA	Mario Sampirisi
33	GK	ITA	Aniello Viscovo
77	MF	ITA	Nicolò Fazzi
87	DF	ITA	Bruno Martella
88	MF	ITA	Andrea Mazzarani
93	DF	ITA	Giuseppe Zampano
98	DF	ITA	Manuel Nicoletti
99	FW	NGR	Simy

== Transfers ==
=== In ===
Date	Pos.	Player	Age	Moving from	Fee	Notes	Source
30 March 2016	FW	(Croatia) Ante Budimir	24	(Germany) St. Pauli	Undisclosed		
3 August 2016	MF	(Sweden) Marcus Rohdén	25	(Sweden) Elfsborg	Undisclosed		

=== Out ===
Date	Pos.	Player	Age	Moving to	Fee	Notes	Source

== Pre-season and friendlies ==
Friendly	v

== Competitions ==
=== Overall ===
Competition	Started round	Current position	Final position	First match	Last match
Serie A	Matchday 1	—	17th	20 August 2016	28 May 2017
Coppa Italia	Third round	—	Third round	14 August 2016	14 August 2016

Last updated: 28 May 2017

=== Serie A ===
==== League table ====
Pos	Team	Pld	W	D	L	GF	GA	GD	Pts	Qualification or relegation
15	Bologna	38	11	8	19	40	58	−18	41	
16	Genoa	38	9	9	20	38	64	−26	36	
17	Crotone	38	9	7	22	34	58	−24	34	
18	Empoli (R)	38	8	8	22	29	61	−32	32	Relegation to Serie B
19	Palermo (R)	38	6	8	24	33	77	−44	26	Relegation to Serie B

Source: Serie A, Soccerway
Rules for classification: 1) Points; 2) Head-to-head points; 3) Head-to-head goal difference; 4) Goal difference; 5) Goals scored; 6) Draw.
(R) Relegated

==== Results summary ====
Overall								Home						Away					
Pld	W	D	L	GF	GA	GD	Pts	W	D	L	GF	GA	GD	W	D	L	GF	GA	GD
38	9	7	22	34	58	−24	34	6	4	9	21	25	−4	3	3	13	13	33	−20

Last updated: 28 May 2017.
Source: Competitive matches

==== Results by round ====
Round	1	2	3	4	5	6	7	8	9	10	11	12	13	14	15	16	17	18	19	20	21	22	23	24	25	26	27	28	29	30	31	32	33	34	35	36	37	38
Ground	A	H	A	H	A	H	A	A	H	A	H	A	H	H	A	H	A	H	A	H	A	H	A	H	A	H	H	A	H	A	H	A	A	H	A	H	A	H
Result	L	L	L	D	L	L	L	L	L	D	W	L	L	D	L	W	L	L	L	L	D	W	L	L	L	L	D	L	L	W	W	D	W	D	W	W	L	W
Position	15	19	20	20	20	20	20	20	20	20	20	20	20	19	19	18	18	19	19	19	18	18	19	19	19	19	19	19	19	18	18	18	18	18	18	18	18	17

Updated to match(es) played on 28 May 2017. Source: Competitive matches
A = Away; H = Home; W = Win; D = Draw; L = Loss

==== Matches ====
21 August 2016 1	Bologna	1–0	Crotone	Bologna
20:45 CEST (UTC+02:00)	Pulgar (yellow card) 75'; Destro 86'	Report	Rohdén (yellow card) 35'	Stadium: Stadio Renato Dall'Ara; Attendance: 18,396; Referee: Claudio Gavillucci

28 August 2016 2	Crotone	1–3	Genoa	Pescara
20:45 CEST (UTC+02:00)	Ferrari (yellow card) 14'; Palladino 34', (yellow card) 68'	Report	Gakpé 51'; Pavoletti 55', 63'; Laxalt (yellow card) 62'; Izzo (yellow card) 88'	Stadium: Stadio Adriatico – Giovanni Cornacchia; Attendance: 821; Referee: Nicola Rizzoli

12 September 2016 3	Empoli	2–1	Crotone	Empoli
20:45 CEST (UTC+02:00)	Bellusci 31'; Costa 56'; Croce (yellow card) 90+4'	Report	Dussenne (yellow card) 23' (yellow-red card) 80'; Sampirisi 45+2'; Crisetig (yellow card) 52'	Stadium: Stadio Carlo Castellani; Attendance: 7,678; Referee: Paolo Valeri

18 September 2016 4	Crotone	1–1	Palermo	Pescara
15:00 CEST (UTC+02:00)	Trotta 23'; Capezzi (yellow card) 45+2'; Crisetig (yellow card) 71'; Claiton (yellow card) 90'	Report	Nestorovski 66'; Goldaniga (yellow card) 81'; Anđelković (yellow card) 88'	Stadium: Stadio Adriatico – Giovanni Cornacchia; Attendance: 510; Referee: Domenico Celi

21 September 2016 5	Roma	4–0	Crotone	Rome
20:45 CEST (UTC+02:00)	El Shaarawy 26'; Salah 37'; Džeko 48', 57'	Report	Nalini (yellow card) 50'	Stadium: Stadio Olimpico; Attendance: 24,325; Referee: Carmine Russo

26 September 2016 6	Crotone	1–3	Atalanta	Pescara
19:00 CEST (UTC+02:00)	Tonev (yellow card) 66'; Ceccherini (yellow card) 71'; Capezzi (yellow card) 81'; Simy 86'	Report	Petagna 3'; Masiello (yellow card) 36'; Kurtić 40'; Gómez 45+1'; Kessié (red card) 62'	Stadium: Stadio Adriatico – Giovanni Cornacchia; Attendance: 522; Referee: Gianluca Rocchi

2 October 2016 7	Cagliari	2–1	Crotone	Cagliari
15:00 CEST (UTC+02:00)	Di Gennaro 38'; Padoin 56'	Report	Palladino (yellow card) 43'; Rosi (yellow card) 48'; Rohdén (yellow card) 75'; Stoian 90+1'; Dussenne (yellow card) 90+2'	Stadium: Stadio Sant'Elia; Attendance: 14,501; Referee: Piero Giacomelli

16 October 2016 8	Sassuolo	2–1	Crotone	Reggio Emilia
15:00 CEST (UTC+02:00)	Sensi 83'; Iemmello 86', (yellow card) 87'	Report	Falcinelli 2'; Crisetig (yellow card) 33'; Capezzi (yellow card) 85'; Palladino (yellow card) 90+1'	Stadium: Mapei Stadium – Città del Tricolore; Attendance: 11,569; Referee: Davide Massa

23 October 2016 9	Crotone	1–2	Napoli	Crotone
15:00 CEST (UTC+02:00)	Ferrari (yellow card) 32'; Crisetig (yellow card) 58'; Rosi 89'	Report	Callejón 17'; Gabbiadini (red card) 31'; Maksimović 33'	Stadium: Stadio Ezio Scida; Attendance: 8,329; Referee: Paolo Mazzoleni

26 October 2016 10	Fiorentina	1–1	Crotone	Florence
20:45 CEST (UTC+02:00)	Astori 85'; Salcedo (yellow card) 87'	Report	Falcinelli 24'; Stoian (yellow card) 50'; Ceccherini (yellow card) 75'	Stadium: Stadio Artemio Franchi; Attendance: 22,983; Referee: Claudio Gavillucci

30 October 2016 11	Crotone	2–0	Chievo	Crotone
15:00 CET (UTC+01:00)	Trotta 45+3' (pen.); Rosi (yellow card) 60'; Falcinelli 90+2'	Report	Hetemaj (yellow card) 45'; Spolli (yellow card) 76'	Stadium: Stadio Ezio Scida; Attendance: 7,298; Referee: Luca Pairetto

6 November 2016 12	Internazionale	3–0	Crotone	Milan
18:00 CET (UTC+01:00)	Ranocchia (yellow card) 11'; Perišić 84'; Icardi 88' (pen.), 90+3'	Report	Mesbah (yellow card) 14'; Rosi (yellow card) 70'	Stadium: San Siro; Attendance: 40,626; Referee: Marco Guida

20 November 2016 13	Crotone	0–2	Torino	Crotone
15:00 CET (UTC+01:00)	Palladino (yellow card) 47'	Report	Martínez (yellow card) 71'; Belotti 80', 89'	Stadium: Stadio Ezio Scida; Attendance: 7,759; Referee: Domenico Celi

27 November 2016 14	Crotone	1–1	Sampdoria	Crotone
15:00 CET (UTC+01:00)	Rosi (yellow card) 5'; Trotta (yellow card) 37'; Falcinelli 43'; Ferrari (yellow card) 90+4'	Report	Fernandes 71'	Stadium: Stadio Ezio Scida; Attendance: 7,508; Referee: Fabio Maresca

4 December 2016 15	Milan	2–1	Crotone	Milan
12:30 CET (UTC+01:00)	Pašalić 41'; Locatelli (yellow card) 49'; Sosa (yellow card) 63'; Lapadula 86', (yellow card) 87'; Kucka (yellow card) 90+2'	Report	Falcinelli 26'; Rosi (yellow card) 43'; Crisetig (yellow card) 53'; Rohdén (yellow card) 60'; Stoian (yellow card) 67'	Stadium: San Siro; Attendance: 37,924; Referee: Marco Di Bello

10 December 2016 16	Crotone	2–1	Pescara	Crotone
18:00 CET (UTC+01:00)	Palladino 24' (pen.); Capezzi (yellow card) 68' (yellow-red card) 80'; Falcinelli (yellow card) 75'; Ferrari 83'	Report	Gyömbér (yellow card) 18'; Aquilani (yellow card) 45+1' (yellow-red card) 73'; Manaj (yellow card) 66'; Campagnaro 82'; Zampano (yellow card) 83'	Stadium: Stadio Ezio Scida; Attendance: 7,470; Referee: Antonio Damato

18 December 2016 17	Udinese	2–0	Crotone	Udine
15:00 CET (UTC+01:00)	Théréau 43', 61'	Report	Crisetig (yellow card) 38'; Trotta (yellow card) 55'; Ferrari (yellow card) 59'; Cordaz (red card) 86'; Barberis (yellow card) 90+1'	Stadium: Stadio Friuli; Attendance: 14,346; Referee: Juan Luca Sacchi

8 January 2017 19	Lazio	1–0	Crotone	Rome
15:00 CET (UTC+01:00)	Lombardi (yellow card) 15'; Immobile 90', (yellow card) 90'	Report	Festa (yellow card) 54'; Rohdén (yellow card) 77'	Stadium: Stadio Olimpico; Attendance: 15,000; Referee: Fabio Maresca

14 January 2017 20	Crotone	0–1	Bologna	Crotone
18:00 CET (UTC+01:00)	Palladino (yellow card) 4'; Falcinelli (yellow card) 68'	Report	Gastaldello (yellow card) 41'; Džemaili 51'; Masina (yellow card) 71'; Maietta (yellow card) 76'; Nagy (yellow card) 86'	Stadium: Stadio Ezio Scida; Attendance: 7,474; Referee: Gianpaolo Calvarese

22 January 2017 21	Genoa	2–2	Crotone	Genoa
15:00 CET (UTC+01:00)	Simeone 43'; Cataldi (yellow card) 58'; Ocampos 66' (pen.)	Report	Rosi (yellow card) 34'; Ceccherini 54'; Ferrari 74'; Crisetig (yellow card) 89'	Stadium: Stadio Luigi Ferraris; Attendance: 18,880; Referee: Maurizio Mariani

29 January 2017 22	Crotone	4–1	Empoli	Crotone
15:00 CET (UTC+01:00)	Stoian 24'; Ceccherini (yellow card) 34'; Falcinelli 56', 90+1' (pen.), 90+2', (yellow card) 57'; Rosi (yellow card) 63'	Report	Mchedlidze 39'; Krunić (yellow card) 57'	Stadium: Stadio Ezio Scida; Attendance: 7,486; Referee: Paolo Tagliavento

5 February 2017 23	Palermo	1–0	Crotone	Palermo
18:00 CET (UTC+01:00)	Cionek (yellow card) 9'; Nestorovski 27'; Rispoli (yellow card) 57'	Report	Crisetig (yellow card) 62' (yellow-red card) 69'; Barberis (yellow card) 71'; Stoian (yellow card) 76'	Stadium: Stadio Renzo Barbera; Attendance: 8,934; Referee: Gianluca Rocchi

8 February 2017 18	Crotone	0–2	Juventus	Crotone
18:00 CET (UTC+01:00)		Report	Mandžukić 60'; Bonucci (yellow card) 65'; Higuaín 74'	Stadium: Stadio Ezio Scida; Attendance: 15,354; Referee: Paolo Valeri
Note: Postponed from 22 December 2016 due to the 2016 Supercoppa Italiana.

12 February 2017 24	Crotone	0–2	Roma	Crotone
12:30 CET (UTC+01:00)		Report	Nainggolan 40'; Džeko 77'	Stadium: Stadio Ezio Scida; Attendance: 11,309; Referee: Carmine Russo

18 February 2017 25	Atalanta	1–0	Crotone	Bergamo
18:00 CET (UTC+01:00)	Conti 48', (yellow card) 78'; Freuler (yellow card) 52'	Report	Rosi (yellow card) 29'; Claiton (yellow card) 45'; Ferrari (yellow card) 58'; Crisetig (yellow card) 66'; Ceccherini (yellow card) 69'	Stadium: Stadio Atleti Azzurri d'Italia; Attendance: 17,577; Referee: Luca Banti

26 February 2017 26	Crotone	1–2	Cagliari	Crotone
15:00 CET (UTC+01:00)	Stoian 10'; Rosi (yellow card) 51'; Acosty (yellow card) 59'; Barberis (yellow card) 89'	Report	João Pedro 32'; Barella (yellow card) 61'; Borriello 69'	Stadium: Stadio Ezio Scida; Attendance: 7,341; Referee: Daniele Orsato

5 March 2017 27	Crotone	0–0	Sassuolo	Crotone
15:00 CET (UTC+01:00)	Rosi (yellow card) 37'; Ceccherini (yellow card) 63'; Martella (yellow card) 66'	Report	Gazzola (yellow card) 73'	Stadium: Stadio Ezio Scida; Attendance: 7,544; Referee: Michael Fabbri

12 March 2017 28	Napoli	3–0	Crotone	Naples
15:00 CET (UTC+01:00)	Rog (yellow card) 27'; Insigne 32' (pen.), 70'; Mertens 66' (pen.)	Report	Martella (yellow card) 42'; Crisetig (yellow card) 54'; Ferrari (yellow card) 87'	Stadium: Stadio San Paolo; Attendance: 45,169; Referee: Maurizio Mariani

19 March 2017 29	Crotone	0–1	Fiorentina	Crotone
15:00 CET (UTC+01:00)	Cordaz (yellow card) 41'	Report	Gonzalo (yellow card) 61'; Kalinić 90'	Stadium: Stadio Ezio Scida; Attendance: 7,997; Referee: Luca Pairetto

2 April 2017 30	Chievo	1–2	Crotone	Verona
15:00 CEST (UTC+02:00)	Pellissier 57'; Castro (yellow card) 68'; Radovanović (yellow card) 90+3'	Report	Ferrari 51'; Ceccherini (yellow card) 66'; Rosi (yellow card) 74'; Falcinelli 82'	Stadium: Stadio Marc'Antonio Bentegodi; Attendance: 8,500; Referee: Gianpaolo Calvarese

9 April 2017 31	Crotone	2–1	Internazionale	Crotone
15:00 CEST (UTC+02:00)	Falcinelli 18' (pen.), 22'; Martella (yellow card) 46'; Ceccherini (yellow card) 47'; Acosty (yellow card) 90'; Capezzi (yellow card) 90+8'	Report	Palacio (yellow card) 47'; Banega (yellow card) 51'; D'Ambrosio 65'	Stadium: Stadio Ezio Scida; Attendance: 13,967; Referee: Marco Guida

15 April 2017 32	Torino	1–1	Crotone	Turin
15:00 CEST (UTC+02:00)	Rossettini (yellow card) 43'; Belotti 66' (pen.); Lukić (yellow card) 85'	Report	Cordaz (yellow card) 63'; Ceccherini (yellow card) 65'; Rosi (yellow card) 69'; Simy 81'	Stadium: Stadio Olimpico Grande Torino; Attendance: 18,750; Referee: Daniele Doveri

23 April 2017 33	Sampdoria	1–2	Crotone	Genoa
15:00 CEST (UTC+02:00)	Schick 20'; Praet (yellow card) 61'; Torreira (yellow card) 83'	Report	Ceccherini (yellow card) 62'; Falcinelli 67', (yellow card) 83'; Ferrari (yellow card) 79'; Simy 80'	Stadium: Stadio Luigi Ferraris; Attendance: 18,215; Referee: Nicola Rizzoli

30 April 2017 34	Crotone	1–1	Milan	Crotone
15:00 CEST (UTC+02:00)	Trotta 8'; Ferrari (yellow card) 20'; Crisetig (yellow card) 26'; Falcinelli (yellow card) 90+4'	Report	Kucka (yellow card) 24' (yellow-red card) 90+6'; Deulofeu (yellow card) 43'; Paletta 50'	Stadium: Stadio Ezio Scida; Attendance: 14,518; Referee: Luca Banti

7 May 2017 35	Pescara	0–1	Crotone	Pescara
15:00 CEST (UTC+02:00)	Caprari (yellow card) 42'; Brugman (yellow card) 62'; Benali (yellow card) 76' (red card) 76'; Coulibaly (yellow card) 83'	Report	Capezzi (yellow card) 54'; Tonev 71', (yellow card) 72'	Stadium: Stadio Adriatico – Giovanni Cornacchia; Attendance: 10,447; Referee: Carmine Russo

14 May 2017 36	Crotone	1–0	Udinese	Crotone
15:00 CEST (UTC+02:00)	Rohdén 18'; Falcinelli (yellow card) 37'; Sampirisi (yellow card) 88'	Report	Kums (yellow card) 37'; Ali Adnan (yellow card) 76'	Stadium: Stadio Ezio Scida; Attendance: 8,230; Referee: Michael Fabbri

21 May 2017 37	Juventus	3–0	Crotone	Turin
15:00 CEST (UTC+02:00)	Mandžukić 12'; Dybala 39'; Alex Sandro 83'; Dani Alves (yellow card) 89'	Report	Martella (yellow card) 76'	Stadium: Juventus Stadium; Attendance: 39,596; Referee: Paolo Mazzoleni

28 May 2017 38	Crotone	3–1	Lazio	Crotone
20:45 CEST (UTC+02:00)	Nalini 14', 60', (yellow card) 60'; Falcinelli 22', (yellow card) 23'; Crisetig (yellow card) 33'	Report	Bastos (yellow card) 21' (yellow-red card) 42'; Immobile 26' (pen.); Patric (yellow card) 42'; Biglia (yellow card) 45+1'; Murgia (yellow card) 58'	Stadium: Stadio Ezio Scida; Attendance: 14,594; Referee: Gianluca Rocchi

=== Coppa Italia ===
14 August 2016 Third round	Hellas Verona	2–1	Crotone	Verona
20:45 CEST (UTC+02:00)	Fossati 11'; Valoti (yellow card) 37'; Greco (yellow card) 62'; Zuculini 78'; Ganz (yellow card) 83'	Report	Claiton (yellow card) 15'; Simy 62'; Palladino (yellow card) 90'	Stadium: Stadio Marc'Antonio Bentegodi; Attendance: 7,753; Referee: Carmine Russo

== Statistics ==
=== Appearances and goals ===
No.	Pos	Nat	Player	Total		Serie A		Coppa Italia	
No.	Pos	Nat	Player	Apps	Goals	Apps	Goals	Apps	Goals
Goalkeepers
1	GK	(Italy) ITA	Alex Cordaz	37	0	36	0	1	0
5	GK	(Italy) ITA	Marco Festa	3	0	2+1	0	0	0
33	GK	(Italy) ITA	Aniello Viscovo	0	0	0	0	0	0
Defenders
3	DF	(Brazil) BRA	Claiton	11	0	9+1	0	1	0
13	DF	(Italy) ITA	Gian Marco Ferrari	37	3	37	3	0	0
15	DF	(Algeria) ALG	Djamel Mesbah	10	0	8+2	0	0	0
17	DF	(Italy) ITA	Federico Ceccherini	36	1	35	1	1	0
21	DF	(Italy) ITA	Giuseppe Cuomo	1	0	0+1	0	0	0
22	DF	(Italy) ITA	Aleandro Rosi	31	1	30+1	1	0	0
23	DF	(Belgium) BEL	Noë Dussenne	8	0	4+4	0	0	0
31	DF	(Italy) ITA	Mario Sampirisi	23	1	11+12	1	0	0
42	DF	(Bosnia and Herzegovina) BIH	Ćazim Suljić	2	0	0+2	0	0	0
87	DF	(Italy) ITA	Bruno Martella	29	0	26+3	0	0	0
Midfielders
6	MF	(Sweden) SWE	Marcus Rohdén	35	1	30+4	1	0+1	0
8	MF	(Italy) ITA	Lorenzo Crisetig	32	0	29+3	0	0	0
10	MF	(Italy) ITA	Pietro De Giorgio	1	0	0+1	0	0	0
12	MF	(Romania) ROU	Adrian Stoian	28	3	17+10	3	1	0
14	MF	(France) FRA	Eddy Gnahoré	1	0	0+1	0	0	0
18	MF	(Italy) ITA	Andrea Barberis	27	0	23+3	0	1	0
28	MF	(Italy) ITA	Leonardo Capezzi	26	0	18+7	0	1	0
77	MF	(Italy) ITA	Nicolò Fazzi	2	0	0+1	0	1	0
Forwards
9	FW	(Italy) ITA	Andrea Nalini	18	2	7+10	2	0+1	0
11	FW	(Italy) ITA	Diego Falcinelli	35	13	35	13	0	0
20	FW	(Slovenia) SLO	Andrej Kotnik	2	0	0+2	0	0	0
24	FW	(Bulgaria) BUL	Aleksandar Tonev	14	1	9+4	1	1	0
27	FW	(Ghana) GHA	Boadu Maxwell Acosty	11	0	3+8	0	0	0
29	FW	(Italy) ITA	Marcello Trotta	29	3	23+6	3	0	0
92	FW	(Italy) ITA	Giuseppe Borello	1	0	0+1	0	0	0
99	FW	(Nigeria) NGR	Simy	22	3	4+17	2	0+1	1
Players transferred out during the season
7	FW	(Italy) ITA	Raffaele Palladino	20	2	16+3	2	1	0
11	FW	(Italy) ITA	Nunzio Di Roberto	2	0	0+1	0	1	0
20	MF	(Italy) ITA	Aniello Salzano	8	0	6+1	0	1	0

Last updated: 28 May 2017
Source: Competitions

=== Goalscorers ===
Rank	No.	Pos	Nat	Name	Serie A	Coppa Italia	Total
1	11	FW	(Italy)	Diego Falcinelli	13	0	13
2	99	FW	(Nigeria)	Simy	3	1	4
3	12	MF	(Romania)	Adrian Stoian	3	0	3
3	13	DF	(Italy)	Gian Marco Ferrari	3	0	3
3	29	FW	(Italy)	Marcello Trotta	3	0	3
6	7	FW	(Italy)	Raffaele Palladino	2	0	2
6	9	FW	(Italy)	Andrea Nalini	2	0	2
8	6	MF	(Sweden)	Marcus Rohdén	1	0	1
8	17	DF	(Italy)	Federico Ceccherini	1	0	1
8	22	DF	(Italy)	Aleandro Rosi	1	0	1
8	24	FW	(Bulgaria)	Aleksandar Tonev	1	0	1
8	31	DF	(Italy)	Mario Sampirisi	1	0	1
Own goal					0	0	0
Totals					34	1	35

Last updated: 28 May 2017

=== Clean sheets ===
Rank	No.	Pos	Nat	Name	Serie A	Coppa Italia	Total
1	1	GK	(Italy)	Alex Cordaz	4	0	4
Totals					4	0	4

Last updated: 28 May 2017

=== Disciplinary record ===
No.	Pos	Nat	Player	Serie A			Coppa Italia			Total		
No.	Pos	Nat	Player	Booked	(yellow card) (yellow-red card)	Sent off (straight red)	Booked	(yellow card) (yellow-red card)	Sent off (straight red)	Booked	(yellow card) (yellow-red card)	Sent off (straight red)
1	GK	(Italy)	Alex Cordaz	2	0	1	0	0	0	2	0	1
5	GK	(Italy)	Marco Festa	1	0	0	0	0	0	1	0	0
3	DF	(Brazil)	Claiton	2	0	0	1	0	0	3	0	0
13	DF	(Italy)	Gian Marco Ferrari	8	0	0	0	0	0	8	0	0
15	DF	(Algeria)	Djamel Mesbah	1	0	0	0	0	0	1	0	0
17	DF	(Italy)	Federico Ceccherini	9	0	0	0	0	0	9	0	0
22	DF	(Italy)	Aleandro Rosi	12	0	0	0	0	0	12	0	0
23	DF	(Belgium)	Noë Dussenne	1	1	0	0	0	0	1	1	0
31	DF	(Italy)	Mario Sampirisi	1	0	0	0	0	0	1	0	0
87	DF	(Italy)	Bruno Martella	4	0	0	0	0	0	4	0	0
6	MF	(Sweden)	Marcus Rohdén	4	0	0	0	0	0	4	0	0
8	MF	(Italy)	Lorenzo Crisetig	11	1	0	0	0	0	11	1	0
12	MF	(Romania)	Adrian Stoian	3	0	0	0	0	0	3	0	0
18	MF	(Italy)	Andrea Barberis	3	0	0	0	0	0	3	0	0
28	MF	(Italy)	Leonardo Capezzi	5	1	0	0	0	0	5	1	0
7	FW	(Italy)	Raffaele Palladino	5	0	0	1	0	0	6	0	0
9	FW	(Italy)	Andrea Nalini	2	0	0	0	0	0	2	0	0
11	FW	(Italy)	Diego Falcinelli	7	0	0	0	0	0	7	0	0
24	FW	(Bulgaria)	Aleksandar Tonev	2	0	0	0	0	0	2	0	0
27	FW	(Ghana)	Boadu Maxwell Acosty	2	0	0	0	0	0	2	0	0
29	FW	(Italy)	Marcello Trotta	2	0	0	0	0	0	2	0	0
Totals				87	3	1	2	0	0	89	3	1

Last updated: 28 May 2017
