= 2017–18 UC Sampdoria season =

Sampdoria
2017–18 season
- President: Massimo Ferrero
- Manager: Marco Giampaolo
- Stadium: Stadio Luigi Ferraris
- Serie A: 10th
- Coppa Italia: Round of 16
- Top goalscorer: League: Fabio Quagliarella (19); All: Fabio Quagliarella (19)
- Highest home attendance: 30,117 vs Genoa (7 April 2018, Serie A)
- Lowest home attendance: 4,858 vs Pescara (28 November 2017, Coppa Italia)
- Average home league attendance: 20,156
Home colours	Away colours	Third colours

The 2017–18 season was Unione Calcio Sampdoria's 61st season in Serie A, and their 6th consecutive season in the top-flight. The club competed in Serie A and in the Coppa Italia, finishing 10th in the league after spending most of the campaign in 6th, and being eliminated in the latter competition in the round of 16.

The season was the second in charge for former Empoli manager Marco Giampaolo. Veteran Italian striker Fabio Quagliarella was the club's top scorer, with 19 league goals.

== Players ==
=== Squad information ===
As of 22 February 2018

Note: Flags indicate national team as defined under FIFA eligibility rules; some limited exceptions apply. Players may hold more than one non-FIFA nationality.

No.	Pos.	Nation	Player
1	GK	ITA	Emiliano Viviano
3	DF	DEN	Joachim Andersen
7	MF	ITA	Jacopo Sala
8	MF	PAR	Édgar Barreto
9	FW	ITA	Gianluca Caprari
11	MF	ARG	Ricky Álvarez
12	GK	LTU	Titas Krapikas
13	DF	ITA	Gian Marco Ferrari (on loan from Sassuolo)
14	MF	MNE	Ognjen Stijepović
16	MF	POL	Karol Linetty
17	DF	CRO	Ivan Strinić
18	MF	BEL	Dennis Praet
19	DF	ITA	Vasco Regini (Captain)

No.	Pos.	Nation	Player
21	MF	ITA	Valerio Verre
24	DF	POL	Bartosz Bereszyński
26	DF	ARG	Matías Silvestre
27	FW	ITA	Fabio Quagliarella (Vice-captain)
28	MF	ITA	Leonardo Capezzi
29	DF	ITA	Nicola Murru
34	MF	URU	Lucas Torreira
72	GK	SVN	Vid Belec (on loan from Benevento)
90	MF	URU	Gastón Ramírez
91	FW	COL	Duván Zapata (on loan from Napoli)
92	GK	ITA	Andrea Tozzo
99	FW	POL	Dawid Kownacki

== Transfers ==
=== In ===
Date	Pos.	Player	Age	Moving from	Fee	Notes	Source
30 June 2017	FW	(Italy) Gianluca Caprari	23	(Italy) Internazionale	€15M		
30 June 2017	DF	(Italy) Nicola Murru	22	(Italy) Cagliari	€7M	€7M + Luca Cigarini	
1 July 2017	FW	(Italy) Federico Bonazzoli	20	(Italy) Brescia	Loan return		
1 July 2017	MF	(Italy) Leonardo Capezzi	22	(Italy) Crotone	Loan return		
1 July 2017	FW	(Italy) Francesco Fedato	24	(Italy) Carpi	Loan return		
1 July 2017	MF	(Slovakia) Dávid Ivan	22	(Italy) Bari	Loan return		
1 July 2017	MF	(Switzerland) Alessandro Martinelli	24	(Italy) Brescia	Loan return		
1 July 2017	MF	(Italy) Valerio Verre	23	(Italy) Pescara	Loan return		
11 July 2017	FW	(Poland) Dawid Kownacki	20	(Poland) Lech Poznań	Undisclosed		
4 August 2017	MF	(Uruguay) Gastón Ramírez	26	(England) Middlesbrough	€11M		
25 August 2017	DF	(Denmark) Joachim Andersen	21	(Netherlands) Twente	Undisclosed		
31 August 2017	DF	(Croatia) Božo Mikulić	20	(Croatia) RNK Split	Undisclosed		
31 August 2017	DF	(Croatia) Ivan Strinić	30	(Italy) Napoli	€23M	Fee part of Duván Zapata deal	

==== Loans in ====
Date	Pos.	Player	Age	Moving from	Fee	Notes	Source
4 August 2017	DF	(Italy) Gian Marco Ferrari	30	(Italy) Sassuolo	Loan	Loan with an option to buy	
31 August 2017	FW	(Colombia) Duván Zapata	26	(Italy) Napoli	€23M	Fee part of Ivan Strinić deal; loan with an obligation to buy	
31 January 2018	GK	(Slovenia) Vid Belec	27	(Italy) Benevento	Loan	Swapped for Christian Puggioni	

=== Out ===
Date	Pos.	Player	Age	Moving to	Fee	Notes	Source
27 June 2017	MF	(Portugal) Bruno Fernandes	22	(Portugal) Sporting CP	€9M	€9M + bonuses	
30 June 2017	MF	(Italy) Luca Cigarini	31	(Italy) Cagliari	Free	Included as part of Nicola Murru's transfer	
1 July 2017	MF	(Italy) Angelo Palombo	35	Retired			
4 July 2017	MF	(Slovakia) Jakub Hromada	21	(Czech Republic) Slavia Prague	Undisclosed		
7 July 2017	DF	(Slovakia) Milan Škriniar	22	(Italy) Internazionale	€18M	€18M + Gianluca Caprari	
11 July 2017	FW	(Colombia) Luis Muriel	26	(Spain) Sevilla	€20M	€20M + 20% of any future transfer fee	
31 January 2018	GK	(Italy) Christian Puggioni	37	(Italy) Benevento	Undisclosed	Swapped for Vid Belec	

==== Loans out ====
Date	Pos.	Player	Age	Moving to	Fee	Notes	Source
22 August 2017	FW	(Italy) Federico Bonazzoli	20	(Italy) SPAL	Loan	Loan with an option to buy	
29 August 2017	FW	(Czech Republic) Patrik Schick	21	(Italy) Roma	€5M	€5M + €9M obligation to buy	
31 August 2017	DF	(Bosnia and Herzegovina) Daniel Pavlović	29	(Italy) Crotone	Loan		
18 January 2018	MF	(Serbia) Filip Đuričić	25	(Italy) Benevento	Loan		

== Competitions ==
=== Serie A ===
==== League table ====
Pos	Team	Pld	W	D	L	GF	GA	GD	Pts
8	Fiorentina	38	16	9	13	54	46	+8	57
9	Torino	38	13	15	10	54	46	+8	54
10	Sampdoria	38	16	6	16	56	60	−4	54
11	Sassuolo	38	11	10	17	29	59	−30	43
12	Genoa	38	11	8	19	33	43	−10	41

Source: Serie A, Soccerway
Rules for classification: 1) Points; 2) Head-to-head points; 3) Head-to-head goal difference; 4) Goal difference; 5) Goals scored; 6) Draw.

==== Results summary ====
Overall								Home						Away					
Pld	W	D	L	GF	GA	GD	Pts	W	D	L	GF	GA	GD	W	D	L	GF	GA	GD
38	16	6	16	56	60	−4	54	12	3	4	36	20	+16	4	3	12	20	40	−20

Last updated: 20 May 2018.
Source: Competitive matches

==== Results by round ====
Round	1	2	3	4	5	6	7	8	9	10	11	12	13	14	15	16	17	18	19	20	21	22	23	24	25	26	27	28	29	30	31	32	33	34	35	36	37	38
Ground	H	A	H	A	A	H	A	H	H	A	H	A	H	A	H	A	H	A	H	A	H	A	H	H	A	H	A	A	H	A	H	A	H	A	H	A	H	A
Result	W	W	D	D	D	W	L	W	W	L	W	W	W	L	L	D	L	L	W	L	W	W	D	W	L	W	W	L	L	L	D	L	W	L	W	L	L	L
Position	6	5	6	7	8	7	9	6	6	6	6	6	6	6	6	6	6	6	6	6	6	6	6	6	6	6	6	7	7	8	8	9	8	8	8	9	9	10

Updated to match(es) played on 20 May 2018. Source: Competitive matches
A = Away; H = Home; W = Win; D = Draw; L = Loss

==== Matches ====
20 August 2017 1	Sampdoria	2–1	Benevento	Genoa
20:45 CEST (UTC+02:00)	Quagliarella 38', 54'; Barreto (yellow card) 45'	Report	Ciciretti 15'; Del Pinto (yellow card) 49'; Cataldi (yellow card) 90+5'	Stadium: Stadio Luigi Ferraris; Attendance: 19,223; Referee: Fabrizio Pasqua

27 August 2017 2	Fiorentina	1–2	Sampdoria	Florence
20:45 CEST (UTC+02:00)	Tomović (yellow card) 29'; Badelj (yellow card) 30', (goal) 50'; Chiesa (yellow card) 88'	Report	Praet (yellow card) 2'; Caprari 32'; Quagliarella 35' (pen.), (yellow card) 90+3'; Silvestre (yellow card) 80'; Torreira (yellow card) 90+2'	Stadium: Stadio Artemio Franchi; Attendance: 25,611; Referee: Daniele Doveri

17 September 2017 4	Torino	2–2	Sampdoria	Turin
15:00 CEST (UTC+02:00)	Baselli 13'; Belotti 15'; De Silvestri (yellow card) 60'; Moretti (yellow card) 90+1'	Report	Zapata 1'; Quagliarella 34'; Strinić (yellow card) 59'	Stadium: Stadio Olimpico Grande Torino; Attendance: 19,879; Referee: Paolo Tagliavento

20 September 2017 5	Hellas Verona	0–0	Sampdoria	Verona
20:45 CEST (UTC+02:00)	B. Zuculini (yellow card) 32'; Valoti (yellow card) 75'; Kean (yellow card) 90+5'	Report	Caprari (yellow card) 20'	Stadium: Stadio Marc'Antonio Bentegodi; Attendance: 14,690; Referee: Gianluca Manganiello

24 September 2017 6	Sampdoria	2–0	Milan	Genoa
12:30 CEST (UTC+02:00)	Zapata 72'; Álvarez 90+1'	Report	Donnarumma (yellow card) 72'; Bonucci (yellow card) 83'	Stadium: Stadio Luigi Ferraris; Attendance: 21,896; Referee: Paolo Valeri

30 September 2017 7	Udinese	4–0	Sampdoria	Udine
18:00 CEST (UTC+02:00)	Barák (yellow card) 15'; De Paul 27' (pen.), (yellow card) 32'; López 66' (pen.), 85'; Fofana (yellow card) 76', (goal) 90+5' (pen.); Balić (yellow card) 83'	Report	Barreto (yellow card) 29' (yellow-red card) 40'	Stadium: Dacia Arena; Attendance: 17,935; Referee: Michael Fabbri

15 October 2017 8	Sampdoria	3–1	Atalanta	Genoa
15:00 CEST (UTC+02:00)	Silvestre (yellow card) 44'; Zapata 56'; Caprari 59', (yellow card) 60'; Linetty 68'; Regini (yellow card) 85'	Report	Cristante 21', (yellow card) 90+1'; Freuler (yellow card) 41'; Hateboer (yellow card) 75'	Stadium: Stadio Luigi Ferraris; Attendance: 19,672; Referee: Maurizio Mariani

21 October 2017 9	Sampdoria	5–0	Crotone	Genoa
18:00 CEST (UTC+02:00)	Ferrari 3'; Quagliarella 11' (pen.); Torreira (yellow card) 25'; Caprari 38'; Linetty 71'; Kownacki 76'	Report	Budimir (yellow card) 6'; Stoian (yellow card) 26'; Mandragora (yellow card) 41'	Stadium: Stadio Luigi Ferraris; Attendance: 18,220; Referee: Gianpaolo Calvarese

24 October 2017 10	Internazionale	3–2	Sampdoria	Milan
20:45 CEST (UTC+02:00)	Škriniar 18'; Icardi 32', 54'; Gagliardini (yellow card) 89'; Éder (yellow card) 90'	Report	Murru (yellow card) 61'; Kownacki 64'; Quagliarella 85', (yellow card) 86'	Stadium: San Siro; Attendance: 54,451; Referee: Marco Guida

29 October 2017 11	Sampdoria	4–1	Chievo	Genoa
15:00 CET (UTC+01:00)	Linetty 20', (yellow card) 78'; Torreira 26', 84'; Praet (yellow card) 40'; Zapata 44'	Report	Cacciatore 24', (yellow card) 72'; Castro (yellow card) 26'; Dainelli (yellow card) 60'	Stadium: Stadio Luigi Ferraris; Attendance: 17,972; Referee: Daniele Doveri

4 November 2017 12	Genoa	0–2	Sampdoria	Genoa
20:45 CET (UTC+01:00)	Lapadula (yellow card) 27'; Veloso (yellow card) 58'; Rossettini (yellow card) 69'; Taarabt (yellow card) 81'	Report	Bereszyński (yellow card) 23'; Ramírez 24'; Ferrari (yellow card) 44'; Quagliarella 84'	Stadium: Stadio Luigi Ferraris; Attendance: 32,288; Referee: Massimiliano Irrati

19 November 2017 13	Sampdoria	3–2	Juventus	Genoa
15:00 CET (UTC+01:00)	Zapata 52'; Quagliarella (yellow card) 54'; Ferrari (yellow card) 63', (goal) 79'; Torreira 71'; Linetty (yellow card) 75'; Ramírez (yellow card) 90'	Report	Bernardeschi (yellow card) 14'; Rugani (yellow card) 59'; Khedira (yellow card) 63'; Higuaín 90+1' (pen.); Dybala 90+4'	Stadium: Stadio Luigi Ferraris; Attendance: 28,786; Referee: Marco Guida

25 November 2017 14	Bologna	3–0	Sampdoria	Bologna
15:00 CET (UTC+01:00)	Verdi 3'; Mbaye 23'; Torosidis (yellow card) 44' (yellow-red card) 45+2'; Okwonkwo 73'	Report	Bereszyński (yellow card) 61'; Ferrari (yellow card) 70'	Stadium: Stadio Renato Dall'Ara; Attendance: 20,192; Referee: Fabio Maresca

3 December 2017 15	Sampdoria	1–2	Lazio	Genoa
20:45 CET (UTC+01:00)	Zapata 56'	Report	Milinković-Savić 79'; Caicedo 90+1'; Immobile (yellow card) 90+4'	Stadium: Stadio Luigi Ferraris; Attendance: 18,050; Referee: Paolo Mazzoleni

9 December 2017 16	Cagliari	2–2	Sampdoria	Cagliari
18:00 CET (UTC+01:00)	Ioniță (yellow card) 28'; Farias 56', (yellow card) 67'; Pavoletti 60'; Cigarini (yellow card) 84'	Report	Quagliarella 11', 19'	Stadium: Sardegna Arena; Attendance: 13,424; Referee: Fabrizio Pasqua

17 December 2017 17	Sampdoria	0–1	Sassuolo	Genoa
15:00 CET (UTC+01:00)	Ramírez (yellow card) 67'	Report	Falcinelli (yellow card) 38'; Lirola (yellow card) 49'; Berardi (yellow card) 72'; Goldaniga (yellow card) 84'; Matri 90'; Consigli (yellow card) 90+3'; Ragusa (yellow card) 90+6'	Stadium: Stadio Luigi Ferraris; Attendance: 17,563; Referee: Claudio Gavillucci

23 December 2017 18	Napoli	3–2	Sampdoria	Naples
15:00 CET (UTC+01:00)	Allan 16'; Mertens (yellow card) 21'; Hysaj (yellow card) 26'; Insigne 33'; Hamšík 39'; Mário Rui (yellow card) 52' (yellow-red card) 77'	Report	Ramírez 2', (yellow card) 82'; Strinić (yellow card) 18'; Quagliarella 27' (pen.); Viviano (yellow card) 57'; Torreira (yellow card) 62'; Verre (yellow card) 72'	Stadium: Stadio San Paolo; Attendance: 48,434; Referee: Davide Massa

30 December 2017 19	Sampdoria	2–0	SPAL	Genoa
15:00 CET (UTC+01:00)	Barreto (yellow card) 15'; Ramírez (yellow card) 39'; Sala (yellow card) 65'; Quagliarella 90+2' (pen.), 90+4'	Report	Viviani (yellow card) 13'; Vicari (yellow card) 72'; Schiattarella (yellow card) 77'; Mora (yellow card) 84'	Stadium: Stadio Luigi Ferraris; Attendance: 19,583; Referee: Luca Pairetto

6 January 2018 20	Benevento	3–2	Sampdoria	Benevento
15:00 CET (UTC+01:00)	Brignola (yellow card) 32', (goal) 90+1'; Coda 69', 84'	Report	Caprari 45+1'; Barreto (yellow card) 60'; Sala (red card) 83'; Kownacki 90+4'	Stadium: Stadio Ciro Vigorito; Attendance: 11,363; Referee: Gianluca Manganiello

21 January 2018 21	Sampdoria	3–1	Fiorentina	Genoa
15:00 CET (UTC+01:00)	Quagliarella 30', 60', 68'; Torreira (yellow card) 86'	Report	Eysseric (yellow card) 33'; Pezzella (yellow card) 39'; Sánchez 80'	Stadium: Stadio Luigi Ferraris; Attendance: 19,083; Referee: Fabrizio Pasqua

24 January 2018 3	Sampdoria	1–1	Roma	Genoa
20:45 CET (UTC+01:00)	Linetty (yellow card) 38'; Quagliarella 45+2' (pen.)	Report	Džeko (yellow card) 15', (goal) 90+1'; Strootman (yellow card) 61'; Florenzi (yellow card) 90+2'	Stadium: Stadio Luigi Ferraris; Attendance: 19,302; Referee: Daniele Orsato
Note: Postponed due to inclement weather; originally scheduled for 9 September 2017.

28 January 2018 22	Roma	0–1	Sampdoria	Rome
20:45 CET (UTC+01:00)	Kolarov (yellow card) 57'; Florenzi (yellow card) 80'	Report	Bereszyński (yellow card) 39'; Zapata 80'; Murru (yellow card) 87'	Stadium: Stadio Olimpico; Attendance: 29,468; Referee: Luca Banti

3 February 2018 23	Sampdoria	1–1	Torino	Genoa
18:00 CET (UTC+01:00)	Ramírez (yellow card) 11'; Torreira 11'; Barreto (yellow card) 23'; Viviano (yellow card) 85'	Report	Niang (yellow card) 16'; Acquah 25', (yellow card) 45+4' (yellow-red card) 73'; Baselli (yellow card) 58'	Stadium: Stadio Luigi Ferraris; Attendance: 19,035; Referee: Gianluca Rocchi

11 February 2018 24	Sampdoria	2–0	Hellas Verona	Genoa
15:00 CET (UTC+01:00)	Bereszyński (yellow card) 20'; Barreto 50'; Quagliarella 85' (pen.)	Report	Fares (yellow card) 58'	Stadium: Stadio Luigi Ferraris; Attendance: 18,000; Referee: Luca Pairetto

18 February 2018 25	Milan	1–0	Sampdoria	Milan
20:45 CET (UTC+01:00)	Bonaventura 13', (yellow card) 71'	Report	Linetty (yellow card) 40'; Ferrari (yellow card) 54'; Verre (yellow card) 79'	Stadium: San Siro; Attendance: 46,594; Referee: Daniele Doveri

25 February 2018 26	Sampdoria	2–1	Udinese	Genoa
15:00 CET (UTC+01:00)	Murru (yellow card) 27'; Silvestre 35'; Caprari (yellow card) 62'; Zapata 83'	Report	Stryger Larsen (yellow card) 20'; Jankto (yellow card) 74'; Silvestre 90+5' (o.g.)	Stadium: Stadio Luigi Ferraris; Attendance: 17,767; Referee: Antonio Damato

11 March 2018 28	Crotone	4–1	Sampdoria	Crotone
15:00 CET (UTC+01:00)	Trotta 6', 36'; Stoian 23'; Viviano 85' (o.g.); Martella (yellow card) 90+2'	Report	Murru (yellow card) 41'; Linetty (yellow card) 65'; Zapata 69'	Stadium: Stadio Ezio Scida; Attendance: 8,738; Referee: Paolo Mazzoleni

18 March 2018 29	Sampdoria	0–5	Internazionale	Genoa
12:30 CET (UTC+01:00)	Ramírez (yellow card) 37'; Caprari (yellow card) 53'	Report	Perišić 26'; Icardi 30' (pen.), 31', 44', 51'; Rafinha (yellow card) 77'	Stadium: Stadio Luigi Ferraris; Attendance: 21,336; Referee: Paolo Tagliavento

31 March 2018 30	Chievo	2–1	Sampdoria	Verona
18:00 CEST (UTC+02:00)	Tomović (yellow card) 31'; Depaoli (yellow card) 58'; Castro 62'; Hetemaj 79'; Bani (yellow card) 84'	Report	Quagliarella 26' (pen.); Regini (yellow card) 65'; Torreira (yellow card) 86'	Stadium: Stadio Marc'Antonio Bentegodi; Attendance: 10,000; Referee: Daniele Orsato

3 April 2018 27	Atalanta	1–2	Sampdoria	Bergamo
18:30 CET (UTC+01:00)	Toloi 67'; Petagna (yellow card) 79'; Gómez (yellow card) 82'	Report	Caprari 43'; Praet (yellow card) 83'; Zapata 84', (yellow card) 90'; Ramírez (yellow card) 90+2'	Stadium: Stadio Atleti Azzurri d'Italia; Attendance: 17,612; Referee: Fabrizio Pasqua
Note: Postponed due to Fiorentina player Davide Astori's death; originally scheduled for 4 March 2018.

7 April 2018 31	Sampdoria	0–0	Genoa	Genoa
20:45 CEST (UTC+02:00)	Bereszyński (yellow card) 45'	Report	Pandev (yellow card) 24'; Rigoni (yellow card) 45'	Stadium: Stadio Luigi Ferraris; Attendance: 30,117; Referee: Davide Massa

15 April 2018 32	Juventus	3–0	Sampdoria	Turin
18:00 CEST (UTC+02:00)	Asamoah (yellow card) 33'; Mandžukić 45'; Höwedes (yellow card) 52', (goal) 60'; Khedira 75'	Report		Stadium: Allianz Stadium; Attendance: 40,121; Referee: Maurizio Mariani

18 April 2018 33	Sampdoria	1–0	Bologna	Genoa
20:45 CEST (UTC+02:00)	Silvestre (yellow card) 55'; Zapata 90+3'	Report	Masina (yellow card) 39'; Palacio (yellow card) 80'; Crisetig (yellow card) 84'	Stadium: Stadio Luigi Ferraris; Attendance: 17,563; Referee: Gianluca Manganiello

22 April 2018 34	Lazio	4–0	Sampdoria	Rome
15:00 CEST (UTC+02:00)	Lucas (yellow card) 24'; Milinković-Savić 32'; De Vrij 43'; Immobile 85', 88'	Report	Praet (yellow card) 25'; Torreira (yellow card) 67'	Stadium: Stadio Olimpico; Attendance: 40,000; Referee: Daniele Orsato

29 April 2018 35	Sampdoria	4–1	Cagliari	Genoa
15:00 CEST (UTC+02:00)	Praet 7'; Quagliarella 26'; Linetty (yellow card) 39'; Kownacki 45+4'; Ramírez 87'	Report	Cigarini (yellow card) 19' (yellow-red card) 77'; Pisacane (yellow card) 31'; Farias (yellow card) 37'; Castán (yellow card) 45+1'; Pavoletti 49'; Ioniță (yellow card) 56'; Padoin (yellow card) 82'	Stadium: Stadio Luigi Ferraris; Attendance: 20,189; Referee: Rosario Abisso

6 May 2018 36	Sassuolo	1–0	Sampdoria	Reggio Emilia
18:00 CEST (UTC+02:00)	Peluso (yellow card) 54'; Politano 68'	Report	Ramírez (yellow card) 90'	Stadium: Mapei Stadium – Città del Tricolore; Attendance: 10,483; Referee: Federico La Penna

13 May 2018 37	Sampdoria	0–2	Napoli	Genoa
20:45 CEST (UTC+02:00)	Ramírez (yellow card) 86'; Linetty (yellow card) 90'	Report	Milik 72', (yellow card) 73'; Albiol 80'; Hamšík (yellow card) 86'	Stadium: Stadio Luigi Ferraris; Attendance: 19,250; Referee: Claudio Gavillucci

20 May 2018 38	SPAL	3–1	Sampdoria	Ferrara
18:00 CEST (UTC+02:00)	Antenucci 4' (pen.), 52'; Grassi 50'; Viviani (yellow card) 76'	Report	Caprari (yellow card) 2' (yellow-red card) 33'; Linetty (yellow card) 45'; Kownacki 65'; Quagliarella (yellow card) 74'	Stadium: Stadio Paolo Mazza; Attendance: 12,753; Referee: Marco Di Bello

=== Coppa Italia ===
12 August 2017 Third round	Sampdoria	3–0	Foggia	Genoa
20:45 CEST (UTC+02:00)	Barreto 19'; Caprari 74'; Kownacki 80'	Report	Guarna (yellow card) 75'; Gerbo (yellow card) 82'; Agnelli (yellow card) 89'	Stadium: Stadio Luigi Ferraris; Attendance: 10,000; Referee: Luca Banti

28 November 2017 Fourth round	Sampdoria	4–1	Pescara	Genoa
21:00 CET (UTC+01:00)	Kownacki 2', 74'; Ramírez 9'; Caprari 31'	Report	Perrotta (yellow card) 40'; Benali 53'; Campagnaro (yellow card) 58'; Fornasier (yellow card) 90+2'	Stadium: Stadio Luigi Ferraris; Attendance: 4,858; Referee: Francesco Fourneau

13 December 2017 Round of 16	Fiorentina	3–2	Sampdoria	Florence
17:30 CET (UTC+01:00)	Babacar 2'; Veretout 59' (pen.), 90' (pen.)	Report	Barreto 39', (yellow card) 47'; Ramírez 77' (pen.); Strinić (yellow card) 81'	Stadium: Stadio Artemio Franchi; Attendance: 7,038; Referee: Rosario Abisso

== Statistics ==
=== Appearances and goals ===
No.	Pos	Nat	Player	Total		Serie A		Coppa Italia	
No.	Pos	Nat	Player	Apps	Goals	Apps	Goals	Apps	Goals
Goalkeepers
2	GK	(Italy) ITA	Emiliano Viviano	27	0	27	0	0	0
12	GK	(Lithuania) LTU	Titas Krapikas	0	0	0	0	0	0
72	GK	(Slovenia) SVN	Vid Belec	2	0	2	0	0	0
92	GK	(Italy) ITA	Andrea Tozzo	0	0	0	0	0	0
Defenders
3	DF	(Denmark) DEN	Joachim Andersen	8	0	6+1	0	0+1	0
7	DF	(Italy) ITA	Jacopo Sala	16	0	12+1	0	3	0
13	DF	(Italy) ITA	Gian Marco Ferrari	31	2	29+1	2	0+1	0
17	DF	(Croatia) CRO	Ivan Strinić	18	0	16+1	0	1	0
19	DF	(Italy) ITA	Vasco Regini	17	0	10+4	0	3	0
24	DF	(Poland) POL	Bartosz Bereszyński	31	0	28+3	0	0	0
26	DF	(Argentina) ARG	Matías Silvestre	37	1	34	1	3	0
29	DF	(Italy) ITA	Nicola Murru	23	0	16+4	0	2+1	0
Midfielders
8	MF	(Paraguay) PAR	Édgar Barreto	30	3	24+4	1	2	2
11	MF	(Argentina) ARG	Ricky Álvarez	15	1	2+10	1	2+1	0
14	MF	(Montenegro) MNE	Ognjen Stijepović	1	0	0+1	0	0	0
16	MF	(Poland) POL	Karol Linetty	29	3	21+8	3	0	0
18	MF	(Belgium) BEL	Dennis Praet	35	1	31+1	1	3	0
21	MF	(Italy) ITA	Valerio Verre	19	0	2+16	0	1	0
28	MF	(Italy) ITA	Leonardo Capezzi	8	0	2+4	0	2	0
34	MF	(Uruguay) URU	Lucas Torreira	38	4	36	4	1+1	0
90	MF	(Uruguay) URU	Gastón Ramírez	40	5	28+9	3	1+2	2
Forwards
9	FW	(Italy) ITA	Gianluca Caprari	37	7	19+15	5	3	2
27	FW	(Italy) ITA	Fabio Quagliarella	36	19	33+2	19	1	0
91	FW	(Colombia) COL	Duván Zapata	32	11	24+7	11	1	0
99	FW	(Poland) POL	Dawid Kownacki	24	8	6+16	5	1+1	3
Players transferred out during the season
1	GK	(Italy) ITA	Christian Puggioni	12	0	9	0	3	0
6	DF	(Brazil) BRA	Dodô	0	0	0	0	0	0
10	MF	(Serbia) SRB	Filip Đuričić	2	0	0+1	0	0+1	0
20	DF	(Bosnia and Herzegovina) BIH	Daniel Pavlović	1	0	1	0	0	0
97	FW	(Italy) ITA	Federico Bonazzoli	1	0	0+1	0	0	0

Last updated: 20 May 2018
Source: Competitions

=== Goalscorers ===
Rank	No.	Pos	Nat	Name	Serie A	Coppa Italia	Total
1	27	FW	(Italy)	Fabio Quagliarella	19	0	19
2	91	FW	(Colombia)	Duván Zapata	11	0	11
3	99	FW	(Poland)	Dawid Kownacki	5	3	8
4	9	FW	(Italy)	Gianluca Caprari	5	2	7
5	90	MF	(Uruguay)	Gastón Ramírez	3	2	5
6	34	MF	(Uruguay)	Lucas Torreira	4	0	4
7	8	MF	(Paraguay)	Édgar Barreto	1	2	3
7	16	MF	(Poland)	Karol Linetty	3	0	3
9	13	DF	(Italy)	Gian Marco Ferrari	2	0	2
10	11	MF	(Argentina)	Ricky Álvarez	1	0	1
10	18	MF	(Belgium)	Dennis Praet	1	0	1
10	26	DF	(Argentina)	Matías Silvestre	1	0	1
Own goal					0	0	0
Totals					56	9	65

Last updated: 20 May 2018

=== Clean sheets ===
Rank	No.	Pos	Nat	Name	Serie A	Coppa Italia	Total
1	2	GK	(Italy)	Emiliano Viviano	6	0	6
2	1	GK	(Italy)	Christian Puggioni	3	1	4
Totals					9	1	10

Last updated: 20 May 2018

=== Disciplinary record ===
No.	Pos	Nat	Name	Serie A			Coppa Italia			Total		
No.	Pos	Nat	Name	Booked	(yellow card) (yellow-red card)	Sent off (straight red)	Booked	(yellow card) (yellow-red card)	Sent off (straight red)	Booked	(yellow card) (yellow-red card)	Sent off (straight red)
2	GK	(Italy)	Emiliano Viviano	2	0	0	0	0	0	2	0	0
7	DF	(Italy)	Jacopo Sala	1	0	1	0	0	0	1	0	1
13	DF	(Italy)	Gian Marco Ferrari	4	0	0	0	0	0	4	0	0
17	DF	(Croatia)	Ivan Strinić	2	0	0	1	0	0	3	0	0
19	DF	(Italy)	Vasco Regini	2	0	0	0	0	0	2	0	0
24	DF	(Poland)	Bartosz Bereszyński	5	0	0	0	0	0	5	0	0
26	DF	(Argentina)	Matías Silvestre	3	0	0	0	0	0	3	0	0
29	DF	(Italy)	Nicola Murru	4	0	0	0	0	0	4	0	0
8	MF	(Paraguay)	Édgar Barreto	4	1	0	1	0	0	5	1	0
16	MF	(Poland)	Karol Linetty	8	0	0	0	0	0	8	0	0
18	MF	(Belgium)	Dennis Praet	4	0	0	0	0	0	4	0	0
21	MF	(Italy)	Valerio Verre	2	0	0	0	0	0	2	0	0
34	MF	(Uruguay)	Lucas Torreira	6	0	0	0	0	0	6	0	0
90	MF	(Uruguay)	Gastón Ramírez	9	0	0	0	0	0	9	0	0
9	FW	(Italy)	Gianluca Caprari	4	1	0	0	0	0	4	1	0
27	FW	(Italy)	Fabio Quagliarella	4	0	0	0	0	0	4	0	0
91	FW	(Colombia)	Duván Zapata	1	0	0	0	0	0	1	0	0
Totals				65	2	1	2	0	0	67	2	1

Last updated: 20 May 2018
