= 2019–20 FC Crotone season =

Crotone
2019–20 season
- Chairman: Gianni Vrenna
- Head coach: Giovanni Stroppa
- Stadium: Stadio Ezio Scida
- Serie B: 2nd (promoted)
- Coppa Italia: Third round
- Top goalscorer: League: Simy (20); All: Simy (21)
Home colours	Away colours	Third colours
- All statistics correct as of 31 July 2020.

The 2019–20 F.C. Crotone season was the club's 111th season in existence and the second consecutive season in the second division of Italian football. In addition to the domestic league, Crotone participated in this season's edition of the Coppa Italia. The season covered the period from 1 July 2019 to 31 July 2020.

== Players ==
=== First-team squad ===
As of 21 February 2020.

Note: Flags indicate national team as defined under FIFA eligibility rules; some limited exceptions apply. Players may hold more than one non-FIFA nationality.

No.	Pos.	Nation	Player
1	GK	ITA	Alex Cordaz (Captain)
2	DF	ARG	Marcos Curado (on loan from Genoa)
3	DF	ITA	Giuseppe Cuomo
5	DF	SRB	Vladimir Golemić
6	DF	FRA	Guillaume Gigliotti
7	MF	ITA	Mattia Mustacchio
8	DF	ARG	Nicolás Spolli
9	FW	SWE	Samuel Armenteros (on loan from Benevento)
10	MF	LBA	Ahmad Benali
11	FW	MNE	Marko Janković (on loan from SPAL)
12	GK	ITA	Giacomo Figliuzzi
13	DF	ITA	Gabriele Bellodi (on loan from Milan)
14	MF	ITA	Giovanni Crociata
16	MF	ITA	Alberto Gerbo (on loan from Ascoli)
17	MF	ITA	Salvatore Molina

No.	Pos.	Nation	Player
18	MF	ITA	Andrea Barberis
19	MF	CRO	Tomislav Gomelt
20	FW	ARG	Maxi López
21	MF	ITA	Niccolò Zanellato
22	GK	ITA	Marco Festa
23	MF	ITA	Antonio Mazzotta
24	MF	ITA	Francesco Rodio
25	FW	NGR	Simy
26	MF	FRA	Jean Lambert Evans
27	FW	ITA	Zak Ruggiero
28	MF	NED	Moreno Rutten
29	DF	ITA	Federico Panza
30	MF	BRA	Junior Messias
34	DF	ITA	Luca Marrone (on loan from Verona)

=== Out on loan ===
Note: Flags indicate national team as defined under FIFA eligibility rules; some limited exceptions apply. Players may hold more than one non-FIFA nationality.

No.	Pos.	Nation	Player
—	GK	ITA	Gian Marco Crespi (at Gozzano)
—	GK	ITA	Aniello Viscovo (at Fano)
—	MF	ITA	Francesco Di Giorno (at Este)
—	MF	CRO	Mateo Itrak (at Gorica)
—	MF	FRA	Jeremy Petris (at Bisceglie)
—	MF	VEN	Aristóteles Romero (at Partizani)

No.	Pos.	Nation	Player
—	FW	ITA	Giuseppe Borello (at Cesena)
—	FW	SRB	Luka Marković (at Torino)
—	FW	ITA	Giuseppe Borello (at Cesena)
—	FW	SLE	Augustus Kargbo (at Reggio Audace)
—	FW	SMR	Nicola Nanni (at Monopoli)

== Pre-season and friendlies ==
Win Draw Loss Fixtures

24 July 2019 Friendly	Crotone (Italy)	6–2	(Italy) ACD Morrone	TBD, Italy
17:00 CEST (UTC+2)

29 July 2019 Friendly	Crotone (Italy)	3–0	(Italy) Castrovillari	Crotone, Italy
17:00 CEST (UTC+2)				Stadium: Campo Ampollino

2 August 2019 Friendly	Getafe (Spain)	1–0	(Italy) Crotone	Getafe, Spain
20:00 CEST (UTC+2)				Stadium: Coliseum Alfonso Pérez

5 September 2019 Friendly	Roccella (Italy)	0–2	(Italy) Crotone	TBD, Italy
17:00 CEST (UTC+2)

== Competitions ==
=== Overview ===
Competition	First match	Last match	Starting round	Final position	Record							
Competition	First match	Last match	Starting round	Final position	Pld	W	D	L	GF	GA	GD	Win %
Serie B	24 August 2019	31 July 2020	Matchday 1	2nd	38	20	8	10	63	40	+23	52.63
Coppa Italia	11 August 2019	18 August 2019	Second round	Third round	2	1	0	1	5	6	−1	50.00
Total					40	21	8	11	68	46	+22	52.50

Last updated: 31 July 2020
Source: Soccerway

=== Serie B ===
==== League table ====
Pos	Team	Pld	W	D	L	GF	GA	GD	Pts	Promotion, qualification or relegation
1	Benevento (C, P)	38	26	8	4	67	27	+40	86	Promotion to Serie A
2	Crotone (P)	38	20	8	10	63	40	+23	68	Promotion to Serie A
3	Spezia (O, P)	38	17	10	11	54	40	+14	61	Qualification for promotion play-offs semi-finals
4	Pordenone	38	16	10	12	48	46	+2	58 (Note: Pordenone finished ahead of Cittadella on head-to-head points: Pordenone 0–0 Cittadella, Cittadella 0–2 Pordenone.)	Qualification for promotion play-offs semi-finals
5	Cittadella	38	17	7	14	49	49	0	58	Qualification for promotion play-offs preliminary round

Source: Lega Serie B (in Italian) SOCCERWAY (in English)
Rules for classification: 1) Points; 2) Head-to-head points; 3) Head-to-head goal difference; 4) Goal difference; 5) Goals scored; 6) Draw.
(C) Champions; (O) Play-off winners; (P) Promoted

==== Results summary ====
Overall								Home						Away					
Pld	W	D	L	GF	GA	GD	Pts	W	D	L	GF	GA	GD	W	D	L	GF	GA	GD
38	20	8	10	63	40	+23	68	12	5	2	33	14	+19	8	3	8	30	26	+4

Last updated: 31 July 2020.

==== Results by round ====
Round	1	2	3	4	5	6	7	8	9	10	11	12	13	14	15	16	17	18	19	20	21	22	23	24	25	26	27	28	29	30	31	32	33	34	35	36	37	38
Ground	H	A	H	A	H	A	H	A	H	A	H	H	A	H	A	A	H	A	H	A	H	A	H	A	H	A	H	A	H	A	A	H	A	H	H	A	H	A
Result	D	W	D	L	W	W	W	D	W	L	L	W	L	D	L	L	W	W	W	W	L	L	W	L	W	W	W	W	D	D	D	W	W	W	D	W	W	L
Position	11	7	10	12	8	5	2	2	1	2	3	2	3	2	7	10	6	4	3	3	3	3	2	4	4	3	3	2	2	2	2	2	2	2	2	2	2	2

Updated to match(es) played on 31 July 2020. Source:
A = Away; H = Home; W = Win; D = Draw; L = Loss

==== Matches ====
24 August 2019 1	Crotone	0–0	Cosenza
18:00 CEST (UTC+2)

31 August 2019 2	Spezia	1–2	Crotone
18:00 CEST (UTC+2)

15 September 2019 3	Crotone	0–0	Empoli
15:00 CEST (UTC+2)

21 September 2019 4	Cremonese	2–1	Crotone
15:00 CEST (UTC+2)

24 September 2019 5	Crotone	2–0	Juve Stabia
21:00 CEST (UTC+2)

27 September 2019 6	Pescara	0–3	Crotone
21:00 CEST (UTC+2)

5 October 2019 7	Crotone	3–1	Virtus Entella
15:00 CEST (UTC+2)

20 October 2019 8	Pisa	1–1	Crotone
15:00 CEST (UTC+2)

26 October 2019 9	Crotone	3–2	Venezia
15:00 CEST (UTC+2)

29 October 2019 10	Chievo	2–1	Crotone
21:00 CEST (UTC+2)

2 November 2019 11	Crotone	2–3	Perugia
15:00 CEST (UTC+2)

8 November 2019 12	Crotone	3–1	Ascoli
21:00 CEST (UTC+2)

23 November 2019 13	Benevento	2–0	Crotone
15:00 CEST (UTC+2)

30 November 2019 14	Crotone	1–1	Cittadella
15:00 CEST (UTC+2)

8 December 2019 15	Pordenone	1–0	Crotone
21:00 CEST (UTC+2)

15 December 2019 16	Salernitana	3–2	Crotone
21:00 CEST (UTC+2)

21 December 2019 17	Crotone	2–1	Livorno
15:00 CEST (UTC+2)

26 December 2019 18	Frosinone	1–2	Crotone
15:00 CEST (UTC+2)

29 December 2019 19	Crotone	3–0	Trapani
15:00 CEST (UTC+2)

20 January 2020 20	Cosenza	0–1	Crotone
21:00 CEST (UTC+2)

26 January 2020 21	Crotone	1–2	Spezia
15:00 CEST (UTC+2)

1 February 2020 22	Empoli	3–1	Crotone
18:00 CEST (UTC+2)

8 February 2020 23	Crotone	1–0	Cremonese
15:00 CEST (UTC+2)

15 February 2020 24	Juve Stabia	3–2	Crotone
15:00 CEST (UTC+2)

23 February 2020 25	Crotone	4–1	Pescara
21:00 CEST (UTC+2)

28 February 2020 26	Virtus Entella	1–2	Crotone
21:00 CEST (UTC+2)

3 March 2020 27	Crotone	1–0	Pisa
21:00 CEST (UTC+2)

7 March 2020 28	Venezia	1–3	Crotone
15:00 CEST (UTC+2)

20 June 2020 29	Crotone	1–1	Chievo
18:00 CEST (UTC+2)

26 June 2020 30	Perugia	0–0	Crotone
21:00 CEST (UTC+2)

29 June 2020 31	Ascoli	1–1	Crotone
21:00 CEST (UTC+2)

3 July 2020 32	Crotone	3–0	Benevento
21:00 CEST (UTC+2)

10 July 2020 33	Cittadella	1–3	Crotone
21:00 CEST (UTC+2)

13 July 2020 34	Crotone	1–0	Pordenone
21:00 CEST (UTC+2)

17 July 2020 35	Crotone	1–1	Salernitana
21:00 CEST (UTC+2)

24 July 2020 36	Livorno	1–5	Crotone
18:45 CEST (UTC+2)

27 July 2020 37	Crotone	1–0	Frosinone
21:00 CEST (UTC+2)

31 July 2020 38	Trapani	2–0	Crotone
21:00 CEST (UTC+2)
