= Andrea Barberis =

Italian footballer (born 1993)

Personal information
- Date of birth: 11 December 1993 (age 32)
- Place of birth: Genoa, Italy
- Height: 1.77 m (5 ft 10 in)
- Position: Midfielder

Team information
- Current team: Cittadella
- Number: 5

Youth career
- 2005–2011: Finale Ligure
- 2011–2012: Varese
- 2011–2012: → Palermo (loan)

Senior career*
Years	Team	Apps	(Gls)
2008–2011	Finale Ligure	24	(2)
2012–2015	Varese	42	(1)
2012–2013	→ Pisa (loan)	23	(2)
2015–2020	Crotone	157	(6)
2020–2023	Monza	84	(3)
2023–2024	Pisa	9	(0)
2024–2025	Crotone	13	(0)
2025–	Cittadella	25	(0)

International career
2011	Italy U18	5	(0)
2011	Italy U19	3	(0)
- * Club domestic league appearances and goals as of 29 April 2026

Andrea Barberis (born 11 December 1993) is an Italian professional footballer who plays as a midfielder for Serie C Group A club Cittadella.

== Club career ==
=== Early career ===
Born in Genoa, Liguria, Italy, Barberis started his career at Finale Ligure. In the middle of 2010, he transferred at Lombard club Varese. In August 2011 Barberis was swapped with Jasmin Kurtić, both in temporary deal with option to buy. However, Palermo did not excise the option and paid Varese €200,000 for the counter-option of Kurtić. He played with Palermo's reserves initially, and was assigned kit number 53 for the first team. On 22 June 2012, Barberis left for Pisa, with Alex Benvenga returned to Varese.

=== Monza ===
On 9 June 2020, newly promoted Serie B side Monza announced the signing of Barberis on a free contract. His first goal for the club was a 25-meter free kick on 4 May 2021, in a 2020–21 Serie B game against Lecce which ended in a 1–0 win.

=== Pisa ===
On 21 August 2023, Barberis returned to Pisa.

=== Return to Crotone ===
On 22 October 2024, Barberis returned to Serie C club Crotone on a contract until the end of the season.

== Career statistics ==
As of match played 22 October 2022

Club	Season	League			Coppa Italia		Other		Total	
Club	Season	Division	Apps	Goals	Apps	Goals	Apps	Goals	Apps	Goals
Finale Ligure	2010–11	Promozione	1	0	—		—		1	0
Varese	2012–13	Serie B	—		—		—		0	0
Varese	2013–14	Serie B	18	0	1	0	2 (Note: Appearances in play-offs)	0	21	0
Varese	2014–15	Serie B	24	1	3	0	—		27	1
Varese	Total		42	1	4	0	2	0	48	1
Pisa (loan)	2012–13	Lega Pro 1D	23	2	2	0	6 (Note: Four appearances one goal in play-offs, two appearances three goals in Coppa Italia Lega Pro)	4	31	6
Crotone	2015–16	Serie B	26	1	3	0	—		29	1
Crotone	2016–17	Serie A	26	0	1	0	—		27	0
Crotone	2017–18	Serie A	38	2	1	0	—		39	2
Crotone	2018–19	Serie B	30	2	3	0	—		33	2
Crotone	2019–20	Serie B	37	1	2	1	—		39	2
Crotone	Total		157	6	10	1	0	0	167	7
Monza	2020–21	Serie B	33	1	2	0	2	0	37	1
Monza	2021–22	Serie B	36	2	0	0	4	0	40	2
Monza	2022–23	Serie A	7	0	1	0	—		8	0
Monza	Total		76	3	3	0	6	0	85	3
Career total			299	11	19	1	14	4	332	16
