= Mario Sampirisi =

Italian footballer (born 1992)

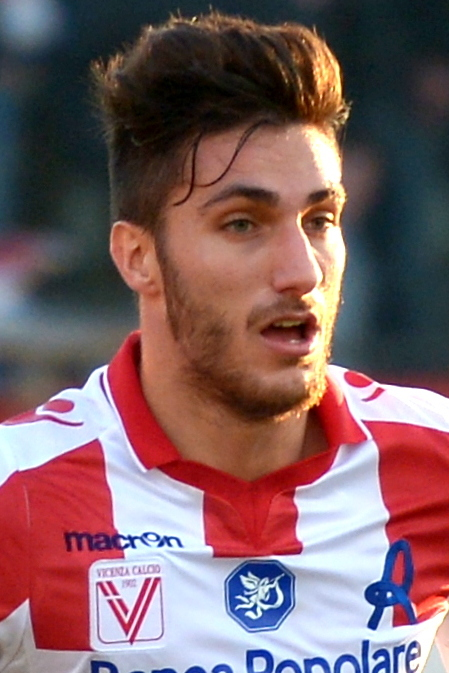
- Sampirisi with Vicenza in 2014

Personal information
- Date of birth: 31 October 1992 (age 34)
- Place of birth: Caltagirone, Italy
- Height: 1.88 m (6 ft 2 in)
- Position: Full-back

Youth career
- Aldini Bariviera
- 2009–2011: AC Milan

Senior career*
Years	Team	Apps	(Gls)
2011–2016	Genoa	24	(0)
2013	→ Chievo (loan)	3	(0)
2014	→ Olhanense (loan)	11	(0)
2014–2016	→ Vicenza (loan)	76	(0)
2016–2019	Crotone	54	(1)
2019–2023	Monza	67	(6)
2022–2023	→ Frosinone (loan)	28	(0)
2023–2026	Reggiana	52	(0)

International career
2011	Italy U19	4	(1)
2011–2012	Italy U20	5	(0)
2012	Italy U21	1	(0)
- * Club domestic league appearances and goals as of 13 May 2026

Mario Sampirisi (born 31 October 1992) is an Italian professional footballer who plays as a full-back.

== Club career ==
=== Genoa ===
On 30 August 2011, Sampirisi joined Genoa in a 4-year contract. He was exchanged with Pelé. Half of Sampirisi's registration rights was "valued" €1,000,000 and Pelé for €950,000. Samprisi made his Serie A debut for Genoa on 22 January 2012 in a game against Palermo when he came on as a substitute in the 45th minute for Juraj Kucka. In June 2012, AC Milan signed Pelé (€900,000) and Chinellato outright (€1,750,000); while Genoa acquired Nicola Pasini (€1,650,000) and Sampirisi outright (€1,000,000). Circa 2012 he signed a new 4-year contract with Genoa (last until 30 June 2016).

In January 2013 he was signed by Chievo.

In January 2014 he was signed by Olhanense.

=== Vicenza ===
On 14 September 2014, he was signed by Serie B newcomer Vicenza in a temporary deal. He scored an own goal in the return leg of the semi-finals of the promotion playoffs. On 10 July 2015 Vicenza re-signed Sampirisi in a temporary deal, with an obligation to sign him outright.

=== Crotone ===
In July 2016, Sampirisi was signed by Crotone on a free transfer.

=== Monza ===
In July 2019, Sampirisi was signed by Monza on a free transfer. On 15 December 2020, Sampirisi scored a brace in the Serie B against Virtus Entella, helping Monza win 5–0. He was subbed on in the 80th minute, scoring a first-touch long-range goal in the 82nd minute, and another in the 90th minute. His two goals were his first in the competition.

Sampirisi helped Monza gain promotion to the Serie A for the first time as their captain in 2021–22. He played 77 games and scored six goals, and was key to helping Monza gain promotions to the Serie B and Serie A.

==== Loan to Frosinone ====
On 24 August 2022, Sampirisi was loaned to Serie B club Frosinone.

=== Reggiana ===
On 27 August 2023, Sampirisi moved to Reggiana.

== International career ==
Samprisi played for Italy internationally at under-19, under-20, and under-21 levels.

== Career statistics ==
=== Club ===
As of match played 29 May 2022

Club	Season	League			National cup (Note: Includes Coppa Italia, Taça de Portugal)		League cup (Note: Includes Taça da Liga)		Other		Total	
Club	Season	Division	Apps	Goals	Apps	Goals	Apps	Goals	Apps	Goals	Apps	Goals
Genoa	2011–12	Serie A	4	0	1	0	—		—		5	0
Genoa	2012–13	Serie A	16	0	0	0	—		—		16	0
Genoa	2013–14	Serie A	4	0	0	0	—		—		4	0
Genoa	2014–15	Serie A	—		—		—		—		0	0
Genoa	2015–16	Serie A	—		—		—		—		0	0
Genoa	Total		24	0	1	0	0	0	0	0	25	0
ChievoVerona (loan)	2012–13	Serie A	3	0	0	0	—		—		3	0
Olhanense (loan)	2013–14	Primeira Liga	11	0	0	0	0	0	—		11	0
Vicenza (loan)	2014–15	Serie B	38	1	0	0	—		2 (Note: Appearance(s) in play-offs)	0	40	1
Vicenza (loan)	2015–16	Serie B	38	0	3	0	—		—		41	0
Vicenza (loan)	Total		76	1	3	0	0	0	2	0	81	1
Crotone	2016–17	Serie A	23	1	0	0	—		—		23	1
Crotone	2017–18	Serie A	31	0	0	0	—		—		31	0
Crotone	2018–19	Serie B	18	0	3	0	—		—		21	0
Crotone	Total		72	1	3	0	0	0	0	0	75	1
Monza	2019–20	Serie C	15	1	0	0	—		—		15	1
Monza	2020–21	Serie B	25	2	2	0	—		2	0	29	2
Monza	2021–22	Serie B	27	3	1	0	—		1	0	29	3
Monza	Total		67	6	3	0	0	0	3	0	73	6
Career total			253	8	10	0	0	0	5	0	268	8

== Honours ==
Monza

- Serie C Group A: 2019–20
