= Giuseppe Borello =

Italian footballer (born 1999)

Personal information
- Date of birth: 28 April 1999 (age 27)
- Place of birth: Catanzaro, Italy
- Height: 1.67 m (5 ft 6 in)
- Position: Forward

Team information
- Current team: Giugliano
- Number: 10

Youth career
- –2012: Catanzarese
- 2012–2018: Crotone
- 2018: → Torino (loan)

Senior career*
Years	Team	Apps	(Gls)
2017–2022	Crotone	20	(1)
2018–2019	→ Cuneo (loan)	15	(2)
2019	→ Rende (loan)	16	(3)
2019–2020	→ Cesena (loan)	26	(6)
2020–2021	→ Pro Vercelli (loan)	11	(0)
2021	→ Cesena (loan)	9	(0)
2022–2023	Újpest	11	(0)
2023–2024	Monopoli	38	(6)
2024–2025	Benevento	15	(0)
2025–	Giugliano	18	(1)

International career
2016	Italy U-18	1	(0)
- * Club domestic league appearances and goals as of 1 May 2026

Giuseppe Borello (born 28 April 1999) is an Italian professional footballer who plays as a forward for Serie C Group C club Giugliano.

== Club career ==
=== Crotone ===
He made his Serie A debut for Crotone on 28 May 2017 in a game against Lazio as an added-time substitute for Diego Falcinelli.

==== Loan to Cuneo and Rende ====
On 16 August 2018, Borello was signed by Serie C side Cuneo on a season-long loan deal. On 17 September he made his Serie C debut for Cuneo in a 1–0 away defeat against Pisa, he was replaced by Giorgio Spizzichino in the 78th minute. Three week later, on 14 October, he scored his first professional goal in the 43rd minute of a 1–0 home win over Olbia. On 25 November he scored his second goal, as a substitute, in the 86th minute of a 3–0 away win over Alessandria. In January 2019, Borello was returned to Crotone leaving Cuneo with 15 appearances, 2 goals and 1 assist, but he never played any entire match.

On 8 January 2019, Borello was loaned to Serie C club Rende on a 6-month loan deal. On 20 January he made his debut for Rende in a 3–0 away defeat against Catanzaro, he played the entire match. Three days later he scored his first goal for the team in the 46th minute of a 4–2 home defeat against Monopoli. He became Rende's first-choice in the second part of the season. On 28 April he scored twice in a 3–1 away win over Viterbese Castrense. Borello ended his 6-month loan to Rende with 17 appearances, including 16 as a starter, 3 goals and 2 assists.

==== Loan to Cesena ====
On 18 July 2019, Borello was loaned to newly Serie C side Cesena on a season-long loan deal. Five weeks later, on 25 August, Borello made his debut and he scored his first goal for the club in the 43rd minute of a 4–1 away defeat against Carpi, he played the entire match. He became Cesena's first-choice early in the season. On 15 September he scored his second goal in the 66th minute of a 3–2 home win over Triestina. Four more weeks later, on 13 October, he scored his third goal in the 62nd minute of a 3–1 home defeat against Sambenedettese. Borello ended his loan to Cesena with 26 appearances, including 22 as a starter, 6 goals and 1 assist.

==== Loan to Pro Vercelli and Cesena ====
He appeared on the bench for Crotone on 3 October 2020 in a 2020–21 Serie A game against Sassuolo. On 5 October 2020 he moved on loan to Serie C club Pro Vercelli, becoming the fifth Crotone player loaned to Pro Vercelli for that season. Six days later, on 11 October, he made his debut for the club as a substitute replacing Alessio Zerbin for the last 15 minutes of a 2–1 home win over Lucchese. On 11 November, Borello played his first match as a starter for the club, a 1–0 home win over Pistoiese, he was replaced by Alessandro Romairone in the 71st minute. However in January 2021 his loan was terminated and he returned to Crotone leaving Pro Vercelli with 11 appearances, including only 3 of them as a starter and without playing any entire match for the club.

On 15 January 2021, Borello returned on another loan to Serie C club Cesena until the end of the season. On the next day he made his debut for Cesena as a substitute replacing Mattia Bortolussi in the 89th minute of a 2–0 away win over Arezzo. Two weeks later, on 30 January, Borello played his first entire match for the club in a 2–1 away defeat against Triestina. Borello ended his 6-months loan to Cesena with only 9 appearances, he also helped the club to reach the play-off but Cesena was eliminated by Matelica in the second round.

=== Újpest ===
On 4 August 2022, Borello joined Újpest in Hungary.

=== Monopoli ===
On 8 August 2023, Borello signed a two-year contract with Monopoli.

== International career ==
Borello represented Italy only at Under 18 level. On 11 November 2016, Borello made his international debut as a substitute replacing Christian Capone in the 80th minute of a 1–0 home win over Austria U-18 in an international friendly.

== Career statistics ==
=== Club ===
As of 11 April 2021

Club	Season	League			Cup		Europe		Other		Total	
Club	Season	League	Apps	Goals	Apps	Goals	Apps	Goals	Apps	Goals	Apps	Goals
Crotone	2016–17	Serie A	1	0	0	0	—		—		1	0
Crotone	2017–18	Serie A	0	0	0	0	—		—		0	0
Cuneo (loan)	2018–19	Serie C	15	2	0	0	—		—		15	2
Rende (loan)	2018–19	Serie C	16	3	—		—		1 (Note: All appearance(s) in Serie C play-off.)	0	17	3
Cesena (loan)	2019–20	Serie C	26	6	0	0	—		—		26	6
Pro Vercelli (loan)	2020–21	Serie C	11	0	0	0	—		—		11	0
Cesena (loan)	2020–21	Serie C	9	0	—		—		—		9	0
Career total			78	11	0	0	—		1	0	79	11

== Honours ==
=== Club ===
Torino Primavera

- Coppa Italia Primavera: 2017–18
