= Daniel Pavlović =

Bosnian footballer (born 1988)

Personal information
- Full name: Daniel Pavlović
- Date of birth: 22 April 1988 (age 38)
- Place of birth: Rorschach, Switzerland
- Height: 1.83 m (6 ft 0 in)
- Position: Left back

Team information
- Current team: Basel U21

Youth career
- FC Rorschach
- St. Gallen
- 2004–2006: SC Freiburg

Senior career*
Years	Team	Apps	(Gls)
2006–2007	SC Freiburg II	10	(1)
2007–2010	FC Schaffhausen	44	(6)
2009–2010	→ 1. FC Kaiserslautern (loan)	14	(0)
2010–2016	Grasshopper	120	(4)
2015–2016	→ Frosinone (loan)	22	(0)
2016–2018	Sampdoria	10	(0)
2017–2018	→ Crotone (loan)	10	(0)
2019	Perugia	0	(0)
2019–2020	Lugano	4	(0)
2021–	Chiasso	26	(2)
2022–2023	→ Basel U21 (loan)	3	(1)

International career
2005–2007	Switzerland U19	16	(1)
2007	Switzerland U20	1	(0)
2007–2010	Switzerland U21	16	(1)
2017–	Bosnia and Herzegovina	2	(0)

Managerial career
- 2024–: Grasshoppers Academy (goalkeeping)
- * Club domestic league appearances and goals

Daniel Pavlović (Bosnian pronunciation: [dǎniel pâːʋloʋitɕ]; born 22 April 1988) is a Bosnian professional footballer who plays as a left back for Swiss club Chiasso. He is currently the head goalkeeping coach of Grasshopper Club Zürich's academy.

== Club career ==
Pavlović started playing professionally for SC Freiburg II and spent his early career playing in lower league teams, like FC Schaffhausen and 1. FC Kaiserslautern, up until 2010, when he signed for Grasshopper. Pavlović made a name for himself playing for most successful Swiss club, staying there for five seasons, being the team captain in the last one.

He was signed on one-year loan deal by newly promoted Serie A club Frosinone in the summer of 2015.

In July 2016, Pavlović signed a two-year deal with Sampdoria.

On 31 August 2017, Pavlović joined Crotone on a loan deal. After the loan deal in June 2018 ended, he went back to Sampdoria but the next day left the club after his contract had expired.

On 21 March 2019, Pavlović signed with Serie B club Perugia until 30 June 2019, with an option for an extension for another two seasons.

On 18 July 2022, Pavlović was loaned by Basel for their Under-21 squad that plays in the third-tier Swiss Promotion League.

== International career ==
Pavlović represented Switzerland, country of his birth, on various youth levels. However, he decided to represent Bosnia and Herzegovina on senior level, and got FIFA approval in December 2016.

On 25 March 2017, Pavlović made his senior international debut for Bosnia and Herzegovina in a convincing 5–0 win over Gibraltar.

== Career statistics ==
=== Club ===
As of match played 4 April 2018.

Club	Season	League			Cup		Continental		Total	
Club	Season	Division	Apps	Goals	Apps	Goals	Apps	Goals	Apps	Goals
SC Freiburg II	2006–07	Oberliga Baden-Württemberg	10	1	–		–		10	1
FC Schaffhausen	2007–08	Swiss Challenge League	24	1	1	0	–		25	1
FC Schaffhausen	2008–09	Swiss Challenge League	20	5	1	0	–		21	5
FC Schaffhausen	Total		44	6	2	0	–		46	6
1. FC Kaiserslautern (loan)	2009–10	2. Bundesliga	14	0	3	0	–		17	0
Grasshopper	2010–11	Swiss Super League	27	2	4	1	0	0	31	3
Grasshopper	2011–12	Swiss Super League	14	1	2	1	–		16	2
Grasshopper	2012–13	Swiss Super League	23	0	4	0	–		27	0
Grasshopper	2013–14	Swiss Super League	31	1	4	0	4	0	39	1
Grasshopper	2014–15	Swiss Super League	25	0	4	0	2	0	31	0
Grasshopper	Total		120	4	18	2	6	0	144	6
Frosinone (loan)	2015–16	Serie A	22	0	0	0	–		22	0
Sampdoria	2016–17	Serie A	9	0	1	0	–		10	0
Sampdoria	2017–18	Serie A	1	0	0	0	–		1	0
Sampdoria	Total		10	0	1	0	–		11	0
Crotone	2017–18	Serie A	10	0	0	0	–		10	0
Career total			230	11	24	2	6	0	260	13

=== International ===
As of match played 28 March 2017.

National team	Year	Apps	Goals
Bosnia and Herzegovina
Bosnia and Herzegovina	2017	2	0
Bosnia and Herzegovina	2018	0	0
Total		2	0

== Honours ==
1. FC Kaiserslautern

- 2. Bundesliga: 2009–10

Grasshopper

- Swiss Cup: 2012–13
