= Leonardo Capezzi =

Italian footballer (born 1995)

Personal information
- Date of birth: 28 March 1995 (age 31)
- Place of birth: Figline Valdarno, Italy
- Height: 1.78 m (5 ft 10 in)
- Position: Midfielder

Team information
- Current team: Sorrento
- Number: 28

Youth career
- 2004–2008: Sangiovannese
- 2008–2012: Fiorentina

Senior career*
Years	Team	Apps	(Gls)
2012–2016	Fiorentina	0	(0)
2014–2015	→ Varese (loan)	36	(2)
2015–2016	→ Crotone (loan)	33	(2)
2016	Crotone	1	(0)
2016–2020	Sampdoria	6	(0)
2016–2017	→ Crotone (loan)	24	(0)
2018–2019	→ Empoli (loan)	12	(0)
2019–2020	→ Albacete (loan)	7	(0)
2020	→ Salernitana (loan)	7	(0)
2020–2023	Salernitana	37	(1)
2023	Perugia	13	(0)
2023–2026	Carrarese	38	(0)
2026–	Sorrento	15	(0)

International career^{‡}
2011–2012	Italy U17	18	(1)
2014–2016	Italy U20	5	(0)
2016	Italy U21	3	(0)
- * Club domestic league appearances and goals as of 1 May 2026 ‡ National team caps and goals as of 10 November 2016

Leonardo Capezzi (born 28 March 1995) is an Italian professional footballer who plays as a midfielder for Serie C Group C club Sorrento.

== Club career ==
Capezzi is a youth exponent from Fiorentina. He made his professional debut at 7 November 2013, in a Europa League game against Romanian side CS Pandurii Târgu Jiu. Capezzi replaced defender Facundo Roncaglia after 80 minutes and helped Fiorentina come back from 0–1 down to win 2–1 away. On 1 September 2014, he moved on loan to Varese. On 26 June 2015, Capezzi returned to Fiorentina.

On 18 August 2015, he moved on loan to Crotone with an option to ransom and against ransom for Fiorentina. The following year Sampdoria bought him, but he re-joined Crotone on loan.

On 3 August 2018, Capezzi joined Empoli on loan until 30 June 2019.

On 2 September 2019, he joined Spanish side Albacete on loan with an option to buy. On 30 January 2020, Sampdoria terminated the loan and instead sent him on loan to Salernitana.

On 29 September 2020, Capezzi joined Salernitana on permanent deal.

On 30 January 2023, he signed for Perugia until the end of the 2022–23 season, with an option to extend for two more years.

== International career ==
Capezzi made his debut with the Italy U21 side on 2 June 2016, in a friendly match against France.

== Career statistics ==
=== Club ===
As of match played 23 August 2023

Appearances and goals by club, season and competition
Club	Season	League			National Cup (Note: Includes Coppa Italia, Copa del Rey)		Europe		Other		Total	
Club	Season	Division	Apps	Goals	Apps	Goals	Apps	Goals	Apps	Goals	Apps	Goals
Fiorentina	2013–14	Serie A	0	0	0	0	1 (Note: Appearance(s) in UEFA Europa League)	0	—		1	0
Varese (loan)	2014–15	Serie B	36	2	1	0	—		—		37	2
Crotone (loan)	2015–16	Serie B	32	2	0	0	—		—		32	2
Crotone (loan)	2016–17	Serie A	25	0	1	0	—		—		26	0
Crotone (loan)	Total		57	2	1	0	—		—		58	2
Sampdoria	2017–18	Serie A	6	0	2	0	—		—		8	0
Empoli (loan)	2018–19	Serie A	12	0	1	0	—		—		13	0
Albacete (loan)	2019–20	Segunda División	7	0	2	0	—		—		9	0
Salernitana	2019–20	Serie B	7	0	0	0	—		—		7	0
Salernitana	2020–21	Serie B	32	1	2	1	—		—		34	2
Salernitana	2021–22	Serie A	5	0	1	0	—		—		6	0
Salernitana	2022–23	Serie A	0	0	1	0	—		—		1	0
Salernitana	Total		44	1	4	1	—		—		48	2
Perugia	2022–23	Serie B	13	0	0	0	—		—		13	0
Career total			175	5	11	1	1	0	—		187	6
