= Gian Marco Ferrari =

Italian footballer (born 1992)

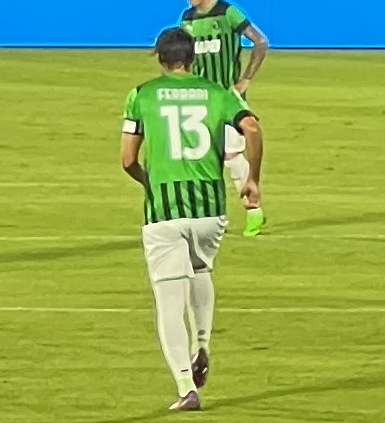
- Ferrari with Sassuolo in 2022

Personal information
- Date of birth: 15 May 1992 (age 34)
- Place of birth: Parma, Italy
- Height: 1.89 m (6 ft 2 in)
- Position: Centre-back

Team information
- Current team: Arezzo
- Number: 67

Youth career
- 2000–2009: Parma

Senior career*
Years	Team	Apps	(Gls)
2009–2013	Parma	0	(0)
2009–2010	→ Monticelli Terme (loan)	10	(1)
2010–2011	→ Crociati Noceto (loan)	0	(0)
2011	→ Fiorenzuola (loan)	15	(0)
2011–2013	→ Renate (loan)	30	(1)
2013–2014	Gubbio	30	(2)
2014–2015	Parma	0	(0)
2014–2015	→ Crotone (loan)	32	(0)
2015–2016	Crotone	41	(1)
2016–2024	Sassuolo	188	(7)
2016–2017	→ Crotone (loan)	37	(3)
2017–2018	→ Sampdoria (loan)	30	(2)
2024–2025	Salernitana	34	(3)
2025–2026	Dubai United		
2026–	Arezzo	0	(0)

International career^{‡}
2021	Italy	1	(1)
- * Club domestic league appearances and goals as of 29 September 2026 ‡ National team caps and goals as of 18 March 2022

Gian Marco Ferrari (born 15 May 1992) is an Italian professional footballer who plays as a centre-back for Serie B club Arezzo. He has previously represented the Italy national team.

== Club career ==
Ferrari joined Renate on loan from Parma in the summer of 2011.

On 3 July 2013, he joined Gubbio in a co-ownership deal for €300,000, with Cristian Damiano having also been signed by Parma for the same price. In June 2014 Parma bought Ferrari back for €200,000, bought Luca Procacci outright for €200,000, and sold Giuliano Laezza outright to Gubbio also for €200,000.

On 3 July 2014, he was signed by Crotone on a temporary deal.

In June 2015, Crotone excised the option to sign Ferrari on a permanent deal.

=== Sassuolo ===
On 31 August 2016, fellow Serie A club Sassuolo signed Ferrari from Crotone. Ferrari, Diego Falcinelli and Marcello Trotta also joined Crotone on loan for 2016–17 Serie A season.

On 4 August 2017, Ferrari was signed by another Serie A club U.C. Sampdoria.

=== Salernitana ===
On 30 August 2024, Ferrari signed with Salernitana in Serie B for one season, with an automatic two-year renewal option, conditional on performance.

== International career ==
Gian Marco Ferrari was first officially called up to Italy’s senior national team on 9 April 2017 for a senior-team training camp at Coverciano, and receive call-up in June 2017 for matches against Uruguay and Liechtenstein. In March 2018, Ferrari was called up to the senior Italy squad for friendlies against Argentina and England.

On 28 May 2021, Ferrari scored his first goal for Italy in a 7–0 home win over San Marino.

== Career statistics ==
=== Club ===
As of match played 26 May 2024

Appearances and goals by club, season and competition
Club	Season	League			National cup		Other		Total	
Club	Season	Division	Apps	Goals	Apps	Goals	Apps	Goals	Apps	Goals
Renate (loan)	2011–12	Lega Pro 2D	15	0	0	0	—		15	0
Renate (loan)	2012–13	Lega Pro 2D	16	1	0	0	—		16	1
Renate (loan)	Total		31	1	0	0	0	0	31	1
Gubbio	2013–14	Lega Pro	30	2	0	0	—		30	2
Crotone (loan)	2014–15	Serie B	32	0	1	0	—		33	0
Crotone	2015–16	Serie B	41	1	3	0	—		44	1
Sassuolo	2018–19	Serie A	31	4	1	0	—		32	4
Sassuolo	2019–20	Serie A	23	0	1	0	—		24	0
Sassuolo	2020–21	Serie A	34	0	0	0	—		34	0
Sassuolo	2021–22	Serie A	36	1	2	0	—		38	1
Sassuolo	2022–23	Serie A	33	1	1	0	—		34	1
Sassuolo	2023–24	Serie A	31	1	1	0	—		32	1
Sassuolo	Total		188	7	6	0	0	0	194	7
Crotone (loan)	2016–17	Serie A	37	3	0	0	—		37	3
Sampdoria (loan)	2017–18	Serie A	30	2	1	0	—		31	2
Career total			389	16	11	0	0	0	400	16

=== International ===
As of match played 28 May 2021

Appearances and goals by national team and year
National team	Year	Apps	Goals
Italy	2021	1	1
Total		1	1

Scores and results list Italy's goal tally first, score column indicates score after each Ferrari goal.

List of international goals scored by Gian Marco Ferrari
No.	Date	Venue	Opponent	Score	Result	Competition
1	28 May 2021	Sardegna Arena, Cagliari, Italy	San Marino	2–0	7–0	Friendly
