= Francesco Di Giorno =

Italian football player

Personal information
- Date of birth: 22 February 2000 (age 26)
- Place of birth: Cetraro, Italy
- Height: 1.73 m (5 ft 8 in)
- Position: Midfielder

Team information
- Current team: Belvedere

Youth career
- –2018: Crotone

Senior career*
Years	Team	Apps	(Gls)
2018–2019	Crotone	0	(0)
2018–2019	→ Rende (loan)	5	(0)
2019	→ Modena (loan)	0	(0)
2019	→ Este (loan)	1	(0)
2019–	Belvedere	0	(0)
- * Club domestic league appearances and goals as of 1 December 2019

Francesco Di Giorno (born 22 February 2000) is an Italian football player. He plays for Belvedere.

== Club career ==
=== Crotone ===
He is the product of Crotone youth teams.

==== Loan to Rende ====
He joined Serie C club Rende on a season-long loan for the 2018–19 season. He made his Serie C debut for Rende on 21 October 2018 in a game against Bisceglie as an 88th-minute substitute for Roberto Sabato. He ended his loan spell early with just 5 substitute appearances for a total of 27 minutes of field time.

==== Loan to Modena ====
On 30 January 2019 he moved on new loan to Serie D club Modena.

==== Loan to Este ====
On 9 July 2019, he signed with Este on loan, again in Serie D.
