= Luca Bruno =

Italian football player

Personal information
- Date of birth: 24 August 1996 (age 30)
- Place of birth: Longhena, Italy
- Height: 1.80 m (5 ft 11 in)
- Position: Centre back

Team information
- Current team: Nissa
- Number: 15

Youth career
- –2015: Brescia

Senior career*
Years	Team	Apps	(Gls)
2014–2015	Brescia	0	(0)
2015–2018	Crotone	0	(0)
2016	→ L'Aquila (loan)	4	(0)
2016–2017	→ Messina (loan)	26	(1)
2017	→ Pro Vercelli (loan)	4	(0)
2018	→ Siracusa (loan)	8	(0)
2018–2019	Siracusa	21	(0)
2019–2020	Rende	28	(0)
2020–2021	Fano	30	(0)
2021–2022	Trapani	28	(0)
2022–2023	Grosseto	28	(0)
2023–2024	San Marzano	18	(1)
2024–	Nissa	64	(0)
- * Club domestic league appearances and goals as of 2 October 2026

Luca Bruno (born 24 August 1996) is an Italian footballer who plays as a centre back for Serie D club Nissa.

== Club career ==
He made his Serie C debut for L'Aquila on 10 April 2016 in a game against Prato.

On 1 November 2018 he returned to Siracusa.

On 15 July 2019, he signed with Rende.

On 19 September 2020 he joined Fano.

On 16 August 2021, he moved to Trapani in Serie D.
