= Ćazim Suljić =

Footballer (born 1996)

Personal information
- Date of birth: 29 October 1996 (age 30)
- Place of birth: Saint-Priest-en-Jarez, France
- Height: 1.78 m (5 ft 10 in)
- Position: Midfielder

Team information
- Current team: Amiens
- Number: 8

Youth career
- –2015: Saint-Étienne

Senior career*
Years	Team	Apps	(Gls)
2014–2016	Saint-Étienne	0	(0)
2014–2016	→ Saint-Étienne II	44	(2)
2016–2019	Crotone	2	(0)
2018	→ Ankaran Hrvatini (loan)	18	(2)
2018–2019	→ Cuneo (loan)	30	(0)
2019–2021	Alessandria	41	(1)
2021–2023	Piacenza	76	(2)
2023–2024	GOAL FC	28	(0)
2024–2026	Nancy	18	(0)
2026–	Amiens	0	(0)

International career^{‡}
2014	Bosnia and Herzegovina U19	3	(0)
- * Club domestic league appearances and goals as of 12 May 2026 ‡ National team caps and goals as of 10 September 2014

Ćazim Suljić (Bosnian pronunciation: [sǔːʎitɕ]; born 29 October 1996) is a footballer who plays as a midfielder for Ligue 3 club Amiens. Born in France, he represented Bosnia and Herzegovina at youth international level.

== Club career ==
Suljić is a youth product of Saint-Étienne. He made his Coupe de la Ligue debut on 16 December 2015 against Paris Saint-Germain. He played the full game.

On 11 July 2019, he signed with Alessandria.

On 28 January 2021, he joined Piacenza on a 2.5-year contract.

== Honours ==
Nancy

- Championnat National: 2024–25
