= Alberto Gerbo =

Italian footballer (born 1989)

Personal information
- Date of birth: 9 November 1989 (age 36)
- Place of birth: Valenza, Italy
- Height: 1.77 m (5 ft 9 1/2 in)
- Position: Midfielder

Senior career*
Years	Team	Apps	(Gls)
2006–2007	Giaveno	32	(1)
2007–2011	Inter	0	(0)
2009–2010	→ Ancona (loan)	13	(0)
2010–2011	→ Triestina (loan)	16	(0)
2011–2012	Gubbio	14	(0)
2012–2014	Latina	34	(1)
2014–2019	Foggia	139	(8)
2019–2021	Ascoli	27	(1)
2020	→ Crotone (loan)	14	(1)
2021–2022	Cosenza	32	(0)
2022–2025	Juve Stabia	44	(0)
- * Club domestic league appearances and goals as of 13 May 2025

Alberto Gerbo (born 9 November 1989) is an Italian footballer who plays as a midfielder.

== Club career ==
On 1 August 2012, Gerbo signed with Serie C club Latina.

On 30 July 2019, he signed a 2-year contract with Ascoli.

On 31 January 2020, he joined Crotone on loan until the end of the 2019–20 season.

On 25 January 2021 he moved to Cosenza on a 1.5-year contract.

On 1 September 2022, Gerbo signed a two-year contract with Juve Stabia.
