= Andrea Nalini =

Italian footballer (born 1990)

Personal information
- Date of birth: 20 June 1990 (age 36)
- Place of birth: Isola della Scala, Verona, Italy
- Height: 1.80 m (5 ft 11 in)
- Position: Forward

Team information
- Current team: Mozzecane

Youth career
- Villafranca

Senior career*
Years	Team	Apps	(Gls)
2007–2014	Virtus Verona	161	(18)
2014–2016	Salernitana	35	(3)
2016–2020	Crotone	59	(3)
2020–2021	Vicenza	19	(2)
2021–2024	Virtus Verona	68	(2)
2024–	Mozzecane	0	(0)
- * Club domestic league appearances and goals as of 3 May 2024

Andrea Nalini (born 20 June 1990) is an Italian footballer who plays as a forward for Mozzecane.

== Club career ==
Nalini started his career with Virtus Verona, playing at the Serie D level for a number of years. In 2013, after the club's promotion to professionalism, he was scouted by Salernitana and signed by them. In 2016, he signed for newly-promoted Serie A side Crotone, making his debut in the top flight. In the final game of the 2016–17 season, he scored a brace (his only two Serie A goals to date) that led Crotone to a vital 2–1 win to Lazio that allowed the Calabrians to escape relegation.

On 31 January 2020, he signed a 1.5-year contract with Vicenza.

On 14 September 2021 he returned to Virtus Verona.
