= Bruno Martella =

Italian footballer (born 1992)

Personal information
- Date of birth: 14 August 1992 (age 34)
- Place of birth: Atri, Italy
- Height: 1.83 m (6 ft 0 in)
- Position: Defender

Team information
- Current team: Cittadella

Youth career
- 2005–2012: Pescara
- 2011–2012: Sampdoria

Senior career*
Years	Team	Apps	(Gls)
2011–2012	→ Viareggio (loan)	10	(0)
2012–2013	→ Perugia (loan)	9	(0)
2013	→ Viareggio (loan)	12	(1)
2013–2014	→ Pisa (loan)	21	(3)
2014–2019	Crotone	135	(4)
2019	→ Brescia (loan)	10	(2)
2019–2021	Brescia	59	(0)
2021–2026	Ternana	109	(3)
2023–2024	→ Feralpisalò (loan)	29	(1)
2026–	Cittadella	0	(0)
- * Club domestic league appearances and goals as of 30 April 2026

Bruno Martella (born 14 August 1992) is an Italian footballer who plays for Serie C Group A club Cittadella.

== Biography ==
=== Pescara ===
Born in Atri, Abruzzo, Martella started his career at the Abruzzo team Pescara. He was a member of the Giovanissimi Provincial U14 team "A" in the 2005–06 season. Martella was a member of Allievi A U17 team in 2008–09 season and lastly for the reserve from 2009 to January 2012. Martella played in Berretti Reserve League in 2009–10 and Primavera Reserve League from 2010 to January 2012 after the first team was promoted to Serie B. He also spent 6 months with Sampdoria's reserve after the club signed Martella in co-ownership deal for €250,000 in 4 1/2-year contract. The co-ownership deal was renewed in June 2011 and Martella returned to Pescara in temporary deal, along with Loris Bacchetti on 1 July 2011.

Martella wore no.42 and no.16 for the first team in 2010–11 Serie B and 2011–12 Serie B respectively. However, he failed to make any debut, despite Martella received call-up. On 20 January 2012 Martella left for Viareggio in temporary deal, with Sampdoria teammate Simone Zaza already joined on 12 January .

Martella made 8 appearances in 2011–12 Lega Pro Prima Divisione.

=== Sampdoria ===
On 21 June 2012, Sampdoria bought Martella outright and allowed Bacchetti returned to Pescara outright.

On 15 July 2012, he left for Perugia of Lega Pro Prima Divisione on a temporary deal. On 25 January 2013 he was signed by Viareggio.

On 8 July 2013, he left for A.C. Pisa 1909 of Lega Pro Prima Divisione in temporary deal.

=== Crotone ===
On 8 July 2014 he was sold to Serie B club Crotone in 3-year contract.

=== Brescia ===
On 31 January 2019, he joined Brescia on loan. At the end of the season, Brescia decided to redeem the player and he penned a 3-year contract with the club.

=== Ternana ===
On 23 August 2021, he signed a three-year contract with Ternana. On 31 July 2023, Martella joined Feralpisalò on loan with an option to buy.

== Career statistics ==
As of match played on 1 August 2020

Appearances and goals by club, season and competition
Club	Season	League			Cup		League Cup		Other		Total	
Club	Season	Division	Apps	Goals	Apps	Goals	Apps	Goals	Apps	Goals	Apps	Goals
Viareggio (loan)	2011–12	Lega Pro Prima Divisione	10	0	0	0	—				10	0
Perugia (loan)	2012–13	Lega Pro Prima Divisione	9	0	0	0	—				9	0
Viareggio (loan)	2012–13	Lega Pro Prima Divisione	12	1	0	0	—				12	1
Pisa (loan)	2013–14	Lega Pro Prima Divisione	21	3	2	1	—				23	4
Crotone	2014–15	Serie B	28	0	1	0	—				29	0
Crotone	2015–16	Serie B	33	3	3	0	—				36	3
Crotone	2016–17	Serie A	29	0	0	0	—				29	0
Crotone	2017–18	Serie A	30	1	2	0	—				32	1
Crotone	2018–19	Serie B	15	0	2	0	—				17	0
Crotone	Total		135	4	8	0	0	0	0	0	143	4
Brescia	2018–19	Serie B	10	2	0	0	—				10	2
Brescia	2019–20	Serie A	24	0	0	0	—				24	0
Brescia	Total		34	2	0	0	0	0	0	0	34	2
Career totals			221	10	10	1	0	0	0	0	231	11
