= Paolo Mazzoleni =

Italian football referee

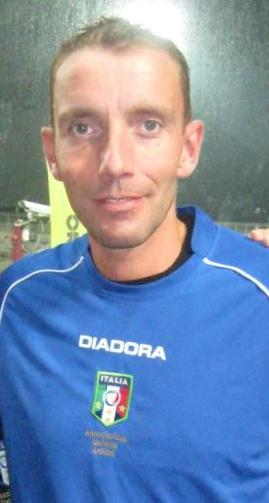
- Mazzoleni at 2012 Piermario Morosini Memorial
- Full name: Paolo Silvio Mazzoleni
- Born: 12 June 1974 (age 52); Bergamo, Italy

Domestic
Years	League	Role
2005–	Serie A	"Referee"

International
Years	League	Role
2011–2018	FIFA listed	"Referee"

Paolo Mazzoleni (born 12 June 1974) is an Italian football referee. He was a full international for FIFA from 2011 to 2018.
