= Diego Falcinelli =

Italian footballer (born 1991)

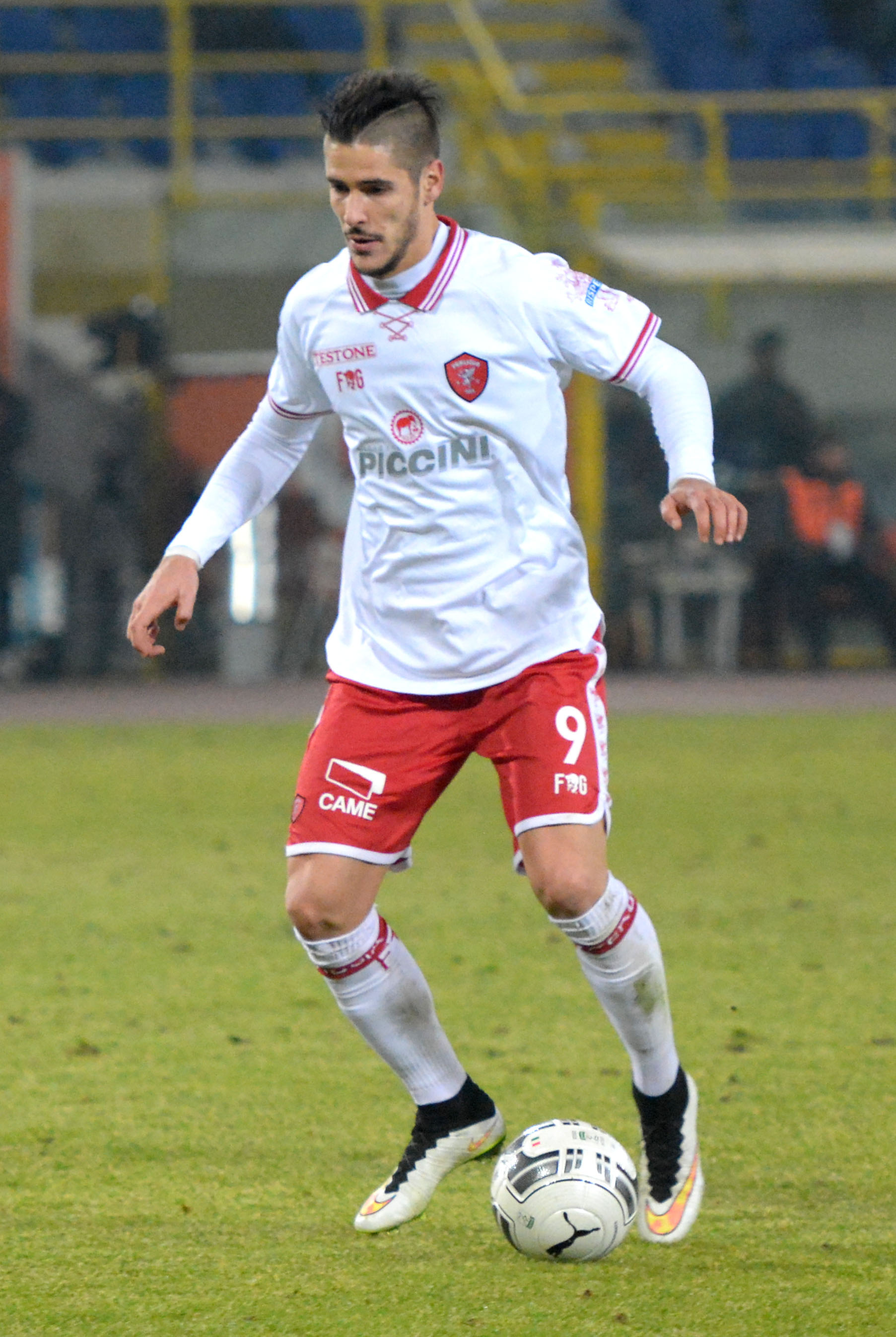
- Falcinelli in action with Perugia in 2015

Personal information
- Date of birth: 26 June 1991 (age 35)
- Place of birth: Marsciano, Italy
- Height: 1.86 m (6 ft 1 in)
- Position: Striker

Team information
- Current team: Cittadella
- Number: 91

Youth career
- –2008: Pontevecchio
- 2007–2008: → Inter Milan (loan)

Senior career*
Years	Team	Apps	(Gls)
2008–2009	Pontevecchio	32	(4)
2009–2010	Sassuolo	1	(0)
2010–2011	Foligno	29	(5)
2011–2018	Sassuolo	49	(4)
2012	→ Juve Stabia (loan)	12	(1)
2012–2014	→ Lanciano (loan)	73	(9)
2014–2015	→ Perugia (loan)	39	(14)
2016–2017	→ Crotone (loan)	35	(13)
2018	→ Fiorentina (loan)	12	(1)
2018–2022	Bologna	21	(0)
2019–2020	→ Perugia (loan)	25	(3)
2020–2021	→ Red Star Belgrade (loan)	23	(9)
2022–2024	Modena	50	(8)
2024–2025	Spezia	38	(1)
2025–	Cittadella	22	(3)

International career^{‡}
2017	Italy B	1	(0)
- * Club domestic league appearances and goals as of 29 April 2026 ‡ National team caps and goals as of 1 October 2020

Diego Falcinelli (born 26 June 1991) is an Italian professional footballer who plays as a striker for Serie C Group A club Cittadella.

== Club career ==
=== Pontevecchio ===
Born in Marsciano, in the Province of Perugia, Falcinelli started his career at Ponte San Giovanni (a frazione of Perugia) based club Pontevecchio. He was loaned to Inter Milan in June 2007. He played one friendly for the first team in February 2008. He also won the Campionato Nazionale Allievi with Inter U17 youth team.

On 1 July 2008, he returned to Perugia, making his Serie D debut.

=== Sassuolo ===
On 2 July 2009, Falcinelli was signed by Sassuolo for the youth team. He also awarded no.26 shirt of the first team, which he made his Serie B debut on 28 November 2009, replacing Gianluigi Bianco in the 82nd minute and assisting Alessandro Noselli for the equalising goal a minute later as Sassuolo drew 2–2 with Ancona.

=== Foligno ===
On 26 July 2010, Falcinelli left for Lega Pro Prima Divisione club Foligno in a co-ownership deal, for a peppercorn fee of one hundred euro. He made his debut on 8 August 2010, in 2010–11 Coppa Italia first round. Since the cup second round, he partnered with Matteo Cavagna and Stefano Giacomelli in a 4–3–3 formation, only missing rounds 6 and 7 of the league.

=== Return to Sassuolo ===
In June 2011 Sassuolo re-signed Falcinelli on a three-year contract, for a transfer fee of €25,000. In January 2012 he was signed by Juve Stabia in a temporary deal.

==== Lanciano and Perugia loans ====
Falcinelli spent two seasons on loan to Serie B club Lanciano, scoring nine goals from 2012 to 2014.

During the 2014 summer transfer window, he joined newly promoted Serie B club Perugia. He scored a career high of 14 goals for the hometown club in 2014–15 Serie B, making him secure a place for Sassuolo in 2015–16 Serie A season.

==== 2015–16 season at Sassuolo ====
Falcinelli picked no.9 shirt in 2015–16 season. On 14 January 2016, he signed a 4 1/2-year contract.

==== Crotone (loan) ====
On 31 August 2016, Falcinelli left for Serie A newcomer Crotone on loan. He scored three goals against Empoli on 29 January 2017. He also scored once on 28 May (round 38), a 3–1 win against Lazio; Crotone secured three points to survive from relegation as well as ranked higher than Empoli for the second time of the season (the team ranked higher than Empoli in round 2; from round 2 to 37 Crotone was in the relegation zone)

Falcinelli signed a new five-year contract with Sassuolo on 25 August 2017.

==== Fiorentina (loan) ====
In January 2018, Falcinelli joined Fiorentina on loan until 30 June 2018 as part of swap deal, in which Khouma Babacar moved the other way. Fiorentina also secured an option to sign Falcinelli permanently from Sassuolo.

=== Bologna ===
On 4 July 2018, Falcinelli joined Bologna on a four-year contract.

==== Return to Perugia ====
On 2 September 2019, he returned to Perugia on a season-long loan.

==== Loan to Red Star Belgrade ====
Coach Siniša Mihajlović, was aware that his former club, Red Star Belgrade, were searching for an experienced striker. Dejan Stanković, having been recently promoted to coach, accepted Mihajlović's suggestion on Falcinelli. Falcinelli and Red Star signed a year-long loan agreement.

=== Modena ===
On 6 July 2022, Falcinelli joined Modena on a two-year contract, with an option for a third year.

=== Spezia ===
On 24 January 2024, Falcinelli signed a contract with Serie B club Spezia until 30 June 2025.

== International career ==
Falcinelli received a call-up to Italy under-20 Lega Pro representative team in September 2010. He also received a call-up to Italy Amateur U18 team and Italy U19 team.

He played once for Italy under-21 Serie B representative team in 2011–12 season.

On 31 May 2017, he debuted for the Italy national team in a non-FIFA sanctioned friendly game against San Marino, which ended in a 8–0 win for Italy.

== Career statistics ==
=== Club ===
As of end of 2021—22 season

Appearances and goals by club, season and competition
Club	Season	League			National Cup		Europe		Other		Total	
Club	Season	Division	Apps	Goals	Apps	Goals	Apps	Goals	Apps	Goals	Apps	Goals
Sassuolo	2009–10	Serie B	1	0	1	0	–		0	0	2	0
Foligno	2010–11	Lega Pro	29	5	2	1	–		2	1	33	7
Sassuolo	2011–12	Serie B	3	0	1	0	–		–		4	0
Sassuolo	2012–13	Serie B	0	0	2	0	–		–		2	0
Sassuolo	2015–16	Serie A	25	2	2	1	–		–		27	3
Sassuolo	2016–17	Serie A	1	0	0	0	4	0	–		5	0
Sassuolo	2017–18	Serie A	20	2	3	1	–		–		23	3
Sassuolo	Total		49	4	8	2	4	0	–			6
Juve Stabia (loan)	2011–12	Serie B	12	1	0	0	–		–		12	1
Virtus Lanciano (loan)	2012–13	Serie B	39	5	0	0	–		–		39	5
Virtus Lanciano (loan)	2013–14	Serie B	34	4	1	0	–		–		35	4
Virtus Lanciano (loan)	Total		73	9	1	0	–		–			9
Perugia (loan)	2014–15	Serie B	38	14	3	1	–		1	0	42	15
Crotone (loan)	2016–17	Serie A	35	13	0	0	–		–		35	13
Fiorentina (loan)	2017–18	Serie A	12	0	0	0	–		–		12	0
Bologna	2018–19	Serie A	16	0	2	1	–		–		18	1
Bologna	2021–22	Serie A	6	0	0	0	–		–		6	0
Bologna	Total		22	0	2	1	–		–		24	1
Perugia (loan)	2019–20	Serie B	27	3	2	0	–		0	0	29	3
Red Star Belgrade (loan)	2020–21	Serbian SuperLiga	23	9	4	2	10	2	—		37	13
Career total			321	58	23	7	14	2	3	1	361	68

== Honours ==
Red Star Belgrade

- Serbian SuperLiga: 2020–21
- Serbian Cup: 2020–21
