= Marco Festa =

Italian footballer

Personal information
- Date of birth: 6 June 1992 (age 34)
- Place of birth: Montichiari, Italy
- Height: 1.90 m (6 ft 3 in)
- Position: Goalkeeper

Team information
- Current team: Cremonese
- Number: 12

Senior career*
Years	Team	Apps	(Gls)
2009–2011	Castellana	63	(0)
2011–2015	Mantova	91	(0)
2012–2013	→ Portogruaro (loan)	1	(0)
2015–2022	Crotone	36	(0)
2022–2023	Pordenone	33	(0)
2023–2026	Mantova	91	(0)
2026–	Cremonese	0	(0)
- * Club domestic league appearances and goals as of 22 August 2026

Marco Festa (born 6 June 1992) is an Italian footballer who plays as a goalkeeper for Serie B club Cremonese.

== Career ==
=== Castellana ===
Festa started off his career at Serie D club Castellana in 2009. He spent 2 years with the club and racked up 63 appearances.

=== Mantova ===
On 1 July 2011, Festa was sold to Mantova for an undisclosed fee. He made 91 appearances for the club. After returning from loan, Festa spent 2 more years at the club.

=== Portogruaro (Loan) ===
On 31 January 2013, Festa was sent out on loan to Portogruaro. He spent half a season there and only made one appearance. That appearance came on 10 February 2013 in a 2-0 loss to San Marino Calcio.

=== Crotone ===
On 11 July 2015, Festa was sold to Serie B club Crotone for an undisclosed fee. In the season they were promoted to Serie A, he made no appearances. He made his top flight debut on 28 August 2016 in a 3-1 loss to Genoa.

=== Pordenone ===
On 14 July 2022 he signed a 2-years deal for Pordenone.

=== Return to Mantova ===
On 11 July 2023, he returned to Mantova.
