= 2015–16 Frosinone Calcio season =

Frosinone
2015–16 season
- Chairman: Maurizio Stirpe
- Manager: Roberto Stellone
- Stadium: Stadio Matusa
- Serie A: 19th
- Coppa Italia: Third round
- Top goalscorer: League: Daniel Ciofani, Federico Dionisi (9); All: Daniel Ciofani, Federico Dionisi (9)
Home colours	Away colours	Third colours

The 2015–16 season was Frosinone Calcio's first-ever season in Serie A. The team was promoted to the first division after finishing second in the 2014–15 Serie B, and competed in Serie A and the Coppa Italia. They were relegated back down to Serie B after just one season in the top flight.

== Players ==
=== Squad information ===
As of 20 February 2016

Note: Flags indicate national team as defined under FIFA eligibility rules; some limited exceptions apply. Players may hold more than one non-FIFA nationality.

No.	Pos.	Nation	Player
1	GK	(Brazil) BRA	Massimo Zappino
3	DF	(Italy) ITA	Roberto Crivello
4	DF	(Italy) ITA	Adriano Russo
5	MF	(Italy) ITA	Mirko Gori
6	DF	(Italy) ITA	Leonardo Blanchard
7	MF	(Italy) ITA	Alessandro Frara (captain)
8	MF	(Austria) AUT	Robert Gucher (vice-captain)
9	FW	(Italy) ITA	Daniel Ciofani
10	MF	(Italy) ITA	Danilo Soddimo
11	MF	(Germany) GER	Oliver Kragl
12	FW	(Italy) ITA	Samuele Longo (on loan from Inter Milan)
13	DF	(Italy) ITA	Matteo Ciofani

No.	Pos.	Nation	Player
17	FW	(Italy) ITA	Luca Paganini
18	FW	(Italy) ITA	Federico Dionisi
19	MF	(Bulgaria) BUL	Aleksandar Tonev
20	DF	(Switzerland) SUI	Daniel Pavlović (on loan from Grasshopper)
21	MF	(Italy) ITA	Paolo Sammarco
22	MF	(Ghana) GHA	Raman Chibsah (on loan from Sassuolo)
25	GK	(Italy) ITA	Francesco Bardi (on loan from Inter Milan)
28	DF	(Italy) ITA	Aleandro Rosi (on loan from Genoa)
29	FW	(Italy) ITA	Massimiliano Carlini
33	GK	(Italy) ITA	Nicola Leali (on loan from Juventus)
44	DF	(Ukraine) UKR	Vasyl Pryima (on loan from Torino)
93	DF	(Albania) ALB	Arlind Ajeti

== Transfers ==
=== In ===
Date	Pos.	Player	Age	Moving from	Fee	Notes	Source
10 July 2015	DF	(France) Modibo Diakité	28	(Italy) Cagliari			
27 August 2015	FW	(Bulgaria) Aleksandar Tonev	25	(England) Aston Villa			
24 November 2015	DF	(Albania) Arlind Ajeti	22	(Switzerland) Basel			

==== Loans in ====
Date	Pos.	Player	Age	Loaned from	Fee	Notes	Source
9 July 2015	FW	(Italy) Daniele Verde	19	(Italy) Roma			
13 July 2015	GK	(Italy) Nicola Leali	22	(Italy) Juventus			
13 July 2015	RW	(Italy) Aleandro Rosi	28	(Italy) Genoa			
15 July 2015	MF	(Ghana) Yussif Raman Chibsah	22	(Italy) Sassuolo			
18 July 2015	DF	(Switzerland) Daniel Pavlović	27	(Switzerland) Grasshopper			
4 August 2015	ST	(Italy) Samuele Longo	23	(Italy) Internazionale			
28 August 2015	ST	(Chile) Nicolás Castillo	22	(Belgium) Club Brugge			

=== Out ===
Date	Pos.	Player	Age	Moving to	Fee	Notes	Source
1 February 2016	DF	(France) Modibo Diakité	28	(Italy) Sampdoria			

== Competitions ==
=== Serie A ===
==== League table ====
Pos	Team	Pld	W	D	L	GF	GA	GD	Pts	Qualification or relegation
16	Palermo	38	10	9	19	38	65	−27	39 (Note: Palermo ahead of Udinese on head-to-head points; Palermo 6 points, Udinese 0 points.)	
17	Udinese	38	10	9	19	35	60	−25	39	
18	Carpi (R)	38	9	11	18	37	57	−20	38	Relegation to Serie B
19	Frosinone (R)	38	8	7	23	35	76	−41	31	Relegation to Serie B
20	Hellas Verona (R)	38	5	13	20	34	63	−29	28	Relegation to Serie B

Source: Serie A, Soccerway
Rules for classification: 1) Points; 2) Head-to-head points; 3) Head-to-head goal difference; 4) Goal difference; 5) Goals scored; 6) Draw.
(R) Relegated

==== Results by round ====
Round	1	2	3	4	5	6	7	8	9	10	11	12	13	14	15	16	17	18	19	20	21	22	23	24	25	26	27	28	29	30	31	32	33	34	35	36	37	38
Ground	H	A	H	A	A	H	A	H	A	H	A	H	A	H	H	A	H	A	H	A	H	A	H	H	A	H	A	H	A	H	A	H	A	A	H	A	H	A
Result	L	L	L	L	D	W	L	W	L	W	L	D	L	W	L	L	L	D	L	L	D	L	W	L	W	D	L	W	L	D	L	L	W	L	L	D	L	L
Position	13	19	20	20	20	16	19	16	17	17	17	18	18	17	18	18	18	18	18	19	19	19	19	19	18	18	18	18	18	19	19	19	18	18	19	19	19	19

Updated to match(es) played on 14 May 2016. Source: Competitive matches
A = Away; H = Home; W = Win; D = Draw; L = Loss

==== Matches ====
23 August 2015 1	Frosinone	1–2	Torino	Frosinone
20:45 CEST (UTC+02:00)	Soddimo 7'; Dionisi (yellow card) 89'; Ciofani (yellow card) 90+5'	Report	Peres (yellow card) 45+1'; Quagliarella 59'; Baselli 64'; Maksimović (yellow card) 74'	Stadium: Stadio Matusa; Attendance: 8,300; Referee: Luca Banti

30 August 2015 2	Atalanta	2–0	Frosinone	Bergamo
20:45 CEST (UTC+02:00)	Stendardo 21'; Pinilla (yellow card) 35'; Gómez 69'	Report	Blanchard (yellow card) 7'; Diakité (yellow card) 35'; Paganini (yellow card) 56'; Dionisi (yellow card) 90+2'	Stadium: Stadio Atleti Azzurri d'Italia; Attendance: 14,546; Referee: Domenico Celi

12 September 2015 3	Frosinone	0–2	Roma	Frosinone
18:00 CEST (UTC+02:00)	Diakité (yellow card) 40'; Pavlović (yellow card) 66'; Rosi (yellow card) 76'; Leali (yellow card) 90+4'	Report	Falque (yellow card) 27', (goal) 44'; Totti (yellow card) 39'; De Rossi (yellow card) 64'; Iturbe 90+3'	Stadium: Stadio Matusa; Attendance: 9,400; Referee: Andrea Gervasoni

20 September 2015 4	Bologna	1–0	Frosinone	Bologna
15:00 CEST (UTC+02:00)	Diawara (yellow card) 18'; Mounier 27'; Crisetig (yellow card) 53'; Ferrari (yellow card) 71'	Report	Longo (yellow card) 32'; Sammarco (yellow card) 48'; Paganini (yellow card) 59'; Soddimo (yellow card) 61'; Pavlović (yellow card) 89'	Stadium: Stadio Renato Dall'Ara; Attendance: 15,722; Referee: Daniele Orsato

23 September 2015 5	Juventus	1–1	Frosinone	Turin
20:45 CEST (UTC+02:00)	Bonucci (yellow card) 46'; Zaza 50', (yellow card) 67'	Report	Crivello (yellow card) 32'; Soddimo (yellow card) 36'; Rosi (yellow card) 84'; Blanchard 90+2'	Stadium: Juventus Stadium; Attendance: 35,793; Referee: Angelo Cervellera

28 September 2015 6	Frosinone	2–0	Empoli	Frosinone
19:00 CEST (UTC+02:00)	Gori (yellow card) 17'; Soddimo (yellow card) 37'; Dionisi 58', 71'; Blanchard (yellow card) 79'	Report	Laurini (yellow card) 27'; Zieliński (yellow card) 51'; Tonelli (yellow card) 75'; Saponara (red card) 77'; Livaja (yellow card) 84'	Stadium: Stadio Matusa; Attendance: 7,165; Referee: Marco Guida

4 October 2015 7	Lazio	2–0	Frosinone	Rome
18:00 CEST (UTC+02:00)	Biglia (yellow card) 53'; Gentiletti (yellow card) 59'; Anderson (yellow card) 68'; Keita 80', (yellow card) 81'; Đorđević 90+4'	Report	Dionisi (yellow card) 53'	Stadium: Stadio Olimpico; Attendance: 27,806; Referee: Marco Di Bello

18 October 2015 8	Frosinone	2–0	Sampdoria	Frosinone
15:00 CEST (UTC+02:00)	Blanchard (yellow card) 20'; Paganini 54'; Dionisi 55' (yellow card) 77'	Report	Zukanović (yellow card) 16'; Ivan (yellow card) 41'; Moisander (yellow card) 78'; Carbonero (yellow card) 88'	Stadium: Stadio Matusa; Attendance: 7,252; Referee: Massimiliano Irrati

25 October 2015 9	Udinese	1–0	Frosinone	Udine
15:00 CET (UTC+01:00)	Ali Adnan (yellow card) 12'; Lodi 20', (yellow card) 86'; Felipe (yellow card) 26'; Wagué (yellow card) 73'	Report	Gori (yellow card) 15'; Castillo (yellow card) 71'	Stadium: Stadio Friuli; Attendance: 13,298; Referee: Nicola Rizzoli

28 October 2015 10	Frosinone	2–1	Carpi	Frosinone
20:45 CET (UTC+01:00)	Soddimo (yellow card) 45' (yellow-red card) 72'; Ciofani 51'; Sammarco (yellow card) 82', (goal) 90+1'	Report	Bianco (yellow card) 45+1'; Marrone 67', (yellow card) 75'; Borriello (red card) 72'; Spolli (yellow card) 87'	Stadium: Stadio Matusa; Attendance: 6,444; Referee: Antonio Damato

1 November 2015 11	Fiorentina	4–1	Frosinone	Florence
12:30 CET (UTC+01:00)	Rebić 24'; Rodríguez 29'; Babacar 31' (pen.); Suárez 43'	Report	Paganini (yellow card) 28'; Frara 87'	Stadium: Stadio Artemio Franchi; Attendance: 27,466; Referee: Michael Fabbri

8 November 2015 12	Frosinone	2–2	Genoa	Frosinone
15:00 CET (UTC+01:00)	Blanchard 31', (yellow card) 67'; Diakité 38'; Dionisi (yellow card) 60'	Report	Pavoletti 6'; Costa (yellow card) 13'; De Maio (yellow card) 32' (yellow-red card) 36'; Figueiras (yellow card) 35'; Gakpé 75'; Burdisso (yellow card) 88'	Stadium: Stadio Matusa; Attendance: 6,450; Referee: Gianpaolo Calvarese

22 November 2015 13	Internazionale	4–0	Frosinone	Milan
20:45 CET (UTC+01:00)	Miranda (yellow card) 26'; Biabiany 29'; Icardi 53'; Murillo 87'; Brozović 90+2'	Report	Diakité (yellow card) 10'; Soddimo (yellow card) 40'; Paganini (yellow card) 62'	Stadium: San Siro; Attendance: 37,469; Referee: Marco Guida

29 November 2015 14	Frosinone	3–2	Hellas Verona	Frosinone
15:00 CET (UTC+01:00)	Ciofani 22' (pen.), 40'; Blanchard (yellow card) 43'; Dionisi 48'	Report	Souprayen (yellow card) 18'; Rafael (red card) 20'; Viviani (yellow card) 45+1', (goal) 69'; Hallfreðsson (yellow card) 60'; Moras (yellow card) 64', (goal) 75'	Stadium: Stadio Matusa; Attendance: 6,864; Referee: Nicola Rizzoli

6 December 2015 15	Frosinone	0–2	Chievo	Frosinone
15:00 CET (UTC+01:00)	Gori (yellow card) 22'; Dionisi (yellow card) 27'; Diakité (yellow card) 88'	Report	Rigoni (yellow card) 16'; Paloschi (yellow card) 33', (goal) 90'; Dainelli (yellow card) 46'; Cacciatore (yellow card) 83'; Pepe (yellow card) 90+2' (yellow-red card) 90+2'; Meggiorini 90+3'	Stadium: Stadio Matusa; Attendance: 6,007; Referee: Gianluca Rocchi

12 December 2015 16	Palermo	4–1	Frosinone	Palermo
18:00 CET (UTC+01:00)	Goldaniga 5'; Vázquez 17'; Đurđević (yellow card) 39'; Trajkovski 60'; Gilardino 86'; González (yellow card) 88'	Report	Sammarco 24'; Pavlović (yellow card) 34'; Blanchard (yellow card) 39'; Gori (yellow card) 42'	Stadium: Stadio Renzo Barbera; Attendance: 14,402; Referee: Daniele Doveri

20 December 2015 17	Frosinone	2–4	Milan	Frosinone
18:00 CET (UTC+01:00)	Ciofani 19', (yellow card) 90+1'; Tonev (yellow card) 45+1'; Soddimo (yellow card) 55'; Blanchard (yellow card) 62'; Pavlović (yellow card) 68'; Dionisi 84'	Report	Niang (yellow card) 49'; Abate 50'; Bacca 55'; Romagnoli (yellow card) 60'; Alex 77'; Donnarumma (yellow card) 83'; Bonaventura 90+3'	Stadium: Stadio Matusa; Attendance: 7,931; Referee: Luca Banti

6 January 2016 18	Sassuolo	2–2	Frosinone	Reggio Emilia
15:00 CET (UTC+01:00)	Ajeti 22' (o.g.); Pellegrini (yellow card) 32' (yellow-red card) 90+3'; Peluso (yellow card) 44'; Falcinelli 75'	Report	Dionisi 16'; Ajeti 45'; Leali (yellow card) 73'; Pavlović (yellow card) 79'	Stadium: Mapei Stadium – Città del Tricolore; Attendance: 8,850; Referee: Luca Pairetto

10 January 2016 19	Frosinone	1–5	Napoli	Frosinone
15:00 CET (UTC+01:00)	Dionisi (yellow card) 21'; Blanchard (yellow card) 32'; Sammarco 81'	Report	Albiol 20'; Higuaín 30' (pen.), 60'; Hysaj (yellow card) 51'; Hamšík 59'; Gabbiadini 71'	Stadium: Stadio Matusa; Attendance: 7,954; Referee: Paolo Tagliavento

16 January 2016 20	Torino	4–2	Frosinone	Turin
17:00 CET (UTC+01:00)	Immobile 9' (pen.); Belotti 37', 41'; Molinaro (yellow card) 60'; Benassi 82'	Report	Bertoncini (yellow card) 7'; Sammarco 33'; Avelar 73' (o.g.)	Stadium: Stadio Olimpico di Torino; Referee: Massimiliano Irrati

23 January 2016 21	Frosinone	0–0	Atalanta	Frosinone
17:00 CET (UTC+01:00)	Gori (yellow card) 30'; Ajeti (yellow card) 43'	Report	Kurtić (yellow card) 41'	Stadium: Stadio Matusa; Referee: Paolo Valeri

30 January 2016 22	Roma	3–1	Frosinone	Rome
19:45 CET (UTC+01:00)	Nainggolan 18'; Manolas (yellow card) 41'; El Shaarawy 48'; Pjanić 84'	Report	Ajeti (yellow card) 15'; Ciofani 24'; Dionisi (yellow card) 64'	Stadium: Stadio Olimpico; Referee: Marco Guida

3 February 2016 23	Frosinone	1–0	Bologna	Frosinone
17:30 CET (UTC+01:00)	Blanchard (yellow card) 29'; Russo (yellow card) 34'; Dionisi 77' (pen.)	Report	Diawara (yellow card) 9'; Taïder (yellow card) 22'; Oikonomou (yellow card) 35' (yellow-red card) 64'; Ferrari (yellow card) 45'; Rossettini (yellow card) 76'	Stadium: Stadio Matusa; Referee: Andrea Gervasoni

7 February 2016 24	Frosinone	0–2	Juventus	Frosinone
15:00 CET (UTC+01:00)	Crivello (yellow card) 53'; Sammarco (yellow card) 76'; Soddimo (yellow card) 90+5'	Report	Cuadrado 73'; Morata (yellow card) 82'; Dybala 90+1'	Stadium: Stadio Matusa; Referee: Davide Massa

13 February 2016 25	Empoli	1–2	Frosinone	Empoli
14:00 CET (UTC+01:00)	Maccarone 59'; Büchel (yellow card) 63'; Rui (yellow card) 90+3'	Report	Ciofani 17', 73' (pen.); Sammarco (yellow card) 35'; Blanchard (yellow card) 56'; Gori (yellow card) 58'; Tonev (yellow card) 64'; Rosi (yellow card) 69'; Longo (yellow card) 85'	Stadium: Stadio Carlo Castellani; Referee: Marco Di Bello

21 February 2016 26	Frosinone	0–0	Lazio	Frosinone
17:00 CET (UTC+01:00)	Rosi (yellow card) 75'; Raman Chibsah (yellow card) 90+4'	Report		Stadium: Stadio Matusa; Referee: Carmine Russo

28 February 2016 27	Sampdoria	2–0	Frosinone	Genoa
15:00 CET (UTC+01:00)	Fernando 44'; Correa (yellow card) 53'; Quagliarella 69', (yellow card) 70'; Silvestre (yellow card) 78'; Krstičić (yellow card) 80'; Moisander (yellow card) 90'	Report	Frara (yellow card) 58'; Sammarco (yellow card) 86'	Stadium: Stadio Luigi Ferraris; Referee: Daniele Orsato

6 March 2016 28	Frosinone	2–0	Udinese	Frosinone
15:00 CET (UTC+01:00)	Ciofani 12'; Paganini (yellow card) 40'; Blanchard 60', (yellow card) 73'	Report	Matos (yellow card) 59'; Théréau (yellow card) 70'; Piris (yellow card) 81'	Stadium: Stadio Matusa; Referee: Nicola Rizzoli

13 March 2016 29	Carpi	2–1	Frosinone	Modena
16:00 CET (UTC+01:00)	Bianco (yellow card) 1', (goal) 27'; Pasciuti (yellow card) 60' de Guzmán 90' (pen.); Letizia (yellow card) 90+5'	Report	Gori (yellow card) 1'; Rosi (yellow card) 67'; Dionisi 72'; Soddimo (yellow card) 89'	Stadium: Stadio Alberto Braglia; Referee: Luca Banti

20 March 2016 30	Frosinone	0–0	Fiorentina	Frosinone
16:00 CET (UTC+01:00)	Ajeti (yellow card) 25'; Gori (yellow card) 35'; Kragl (yellow card) 82'; Sammarco (yellow card) 88'	Report	Alonso (yellow card) 31'; Roncaglia (yellow card) 36'; Astori (yellow card) 49'; Kalinić (yellow card) 81'	Stadium: Stadio Matusa; Referee: Paolo Valeri

3 April 2016 31	Genoa	4–0	Frosinone	Genoa
15:00 CET (UTC+01:00)	Suso 43', 60', 76'; Perin (yellow card) 61'; Rigoni 72'	Report	Gucher (yellow card) 4'; Ajeti (yellow card) 33'; Gori (yellow card) 45+1'; Dionisi (yellow card) 56'	Stadium: Stadio Luigi Ferraris; Referee: Paolo Mazzoleni

10 April 2016 32	Frosinone	0–1	Internazionale	Frosinone
15:00 CET (UTC+01:00)	Gucher (yellow card) 23'; Frara (yellow card) 29'; Kragl (yellow card) 34'; Ajeti (yellow card) 50'; Pavlović (yellow card) 58'; Blanchard (yellow card) 63' (yellow-red card) 80'	Report	D'Ambrosio (yellow card) 32'; Melo (yellow card) 71'; Icardi 74'	Stadium: Stadio Matusa; Referee: Paolo Tagliavento

17 April 2016 33	Hellas Verona	1–2	Frosinone	Verona
15:00 CET (UTC+01:00)	Bianchetti (yellow card) 23', (goal) 64'; Viviani (yellow card) 62'	Report	Russo 15'; Frara (yellow card) 30', (goal) 90+2'; Crivello (yellow card) 74'	Stadium: Stadio Marc'Antonio Bentegodi; Referee: Daniele Doveri

20 April 2016 34	Chievo	5–1	Frosinone	Verona
20:45 CET (UTC+01:00)	Sardo (yellow card) 15', (goal) 60'; Floro Flores 36'; Pellissier 47' (pen.), 80'; Pinzi (yellow card) 55'; Rigoni 58'	Report	D. Ciofani 5'; M. Ciofani (yellow card) 14'; Ajeti (red card) 17'; Leali (yellow card) 18'; Raman Chibsah (yellow card) 30' (yellow-red card) 52'; Soddimo (yellow card) 63'	Stadium: Stadio Marc'Antonio Bentegodi; Referee: Carmine Russo

24 April 2016 35	Frosinone	0–2	Palermo	Frosinone
15:00 CET (UTC+01:00)	Rosi (yellow card) 45+3'; Blanchard (yellow card) 79'; Soddimo (yellow card) 90'	Report	González (yellow card) 24'; Gilardino 56'; Cionek (yellow card) 78'; Maresca (yellow card) 90'; Trajkovski 90+2'	Stadium: Stadio Matusa; Referee: Gianluca Rocchi

1 May 2016 36	Milan	3–3	Frosinone	Milan
15:00 CET (UTC+01:00)	Balotelli (yellow card) 26'; Kucka (yellow card) 45'; Bacca 50'; Antonelli 74'; Ménez 90+2' (pen.)	Report	Paganini 2'; Sammarco (yellow card) 10'; Gori (yellow card) 19'; Bardi (yellow card) 39'; Kragl 44', (yellow card) 45'; Russo (yellow card) 48'; Dionisi 54', (yellow card) 55'; Pryima (yellow card) 90+1'	Stadium: San Siro; Referee: Davide Massa

8 May 2016 37	Frosinone	0–1	Sassuolo	Frosinone
15:00 CET (UTC+01:00)	Gucher (yellow card) 16'; Kragl (yellow card) 32'; Dionisi (yellow card) 81'; Crivello (yellow card) 86'	Report	Peluso (yellow card) 14'; Cannavaro (yellow card) 55'; Berardi (yellow card) 81'; Politano 85', (yellow card) 86'	Stadium: Stadio Matusa; Referee: Angelo Cervellera

15 May 2016 38	Napoli	4–0	Frosinone	Naples
20:45 CET (UTC+01:00)	Jorginho (yellow card) 33'; Hamšík 44'; Higuaín 52', 62', 71'	Report	Gori (red card) 13'; Crivello (yellow card) 14'	Stadium: Stadio San Paolo; Referee: Domenico Celi

=== Coppa Italia ===
15 August 2015 Third round	Frosinone	0–0 (a.e.t.) (5–6 p)	Spezia	Frosinone
20:45 CEST (UTC+02:00)	Diakité (yellow card) 28'; Gori (yellow card) 41'	Report		Stadium: Stadio Matusa; Attendance: 3,321; Referee: Carmine Russo
	Penalties
	Longo (penalty scored); Dionisi (penalty scored); Verde (penalty scored); Carlini (penalty missed); Chibsah (penalty scored); Crivello (penalty scored); Rosi (penalty missed)		(penalty scored) Brezovec; (penalty scored) Postigo; (penalty scored) Miguel; (penalty missed) Catellani; (penalty scored) Calaiò; (penalty scored) Chichizola; (penalty scored) Situm

== Statistics ==
=== Goalscorers ===
Rank	No.	Pos	Nat	Name	Serie A	Coppa Italia	Total
1	9	MF	(Italy)	Daniel Ciofani	9	0	9
1	18	FW	(Italy)	Federico Dionisi	9	0	9
3	21	MF	(Italy)	Paolo Sammarco	4	0	4
4	6	DF	(Italy)	Leonardo Blanchard	3	0	3
5	7	MF	(Italy)	Alessandro Frara	2	0	2
5	17	FW	(Italy)	Luca Paganini	2	0	2
6	4	DF	(Italy)	Adriano Russo	1	0	1
6	10	FW	(Italy)	Danilo Soddimo	1	0	1
6	11	MF	(Germany)	Oliver Kragl	1	0	1
6	24	DF	(France)	Modibo Diakité	1	0	1
6	93	DF	(Albania)	Arlind Ajeti	1	0	1
Own goal					1	0	1
Totals					35	0	35

Last updated:14 May 2016
