= 2015–16 US Sassuolo Calcio season =

Sassuolo
2015–16 season
- President: Carlo Rossi
- Manager: Eusebio Di Francesco
- Stadium: Mapei Stadium – Città del Tricolore
- Serie A: 6th
- Coppa Italia: Fourth round
- Top goalscorer: League: Domenico Berardi, Grégoire Defrel, Nicola Sansone (7); All: Domenico Berardi, Grégoire Defrel, Nicola Sansone (7)
- Highest home attendance: 20,570 vs Juventus (28 October 2015, Serie A)
- Lowest home attendance: 2,071 vs Cagliari (3 December 2015, Coppa Italia)
- Average home league attendance: 11,437
Home colours	Away colours	Third colours

The 2015–16 season is Unione Sportiva Sassuolo Calcio's third consecutive season in Serie A. The team will compete in Serie A and the Coppa Italia.

== Players ==
=== Squad information ===
As of 2 February 2016

Note: Flags indicate national team as defined under FIFA eligibility rules; some limited exceptions apply. Players may hold more than one non-FIFA nationality.

No.	Pos.	Nation	Player
1	GK	ITA	Alberto Pomini
3	DF	ITA	Alessandro Longhi
4	MF	ITA	Francesco Magnanelli (captain)
5	DF	ITA	Luca Antei
6	MF	ITA	Lorenzo Pellegrini
7	MF	ITA	Simone Missiroli
8	MF	ITA	Davide Biondini
9	FW	ITA	Diego Falcinelli
10	MF	ITA	Karim Laribi
11	DF	CRO	Šime Vrsaljko
13	DF	ITA	Federico Peluso
15	DF	ITA	Francesco Acerbi

No.	Pos.	Nation	Player
16	FW	ITA	Matteo Politano (on loan from Roma)
17	FW	ITA	Nicola Sansone
21	DF	ITA	Leonardo Fontanesi
23	DF	ITA	Marcello Gazzola
25	FW	ITA	Domenico Berardi
26	DF	ITA	Emanuele Terranova
28	DF	ITA	Paolo Cannavaro
29	FW	ITA	Marcello Trotta
32	MF	GHA	Alfred Duncan
47	GK	ITA	Andrea Consigli
79	GK	ITA	Gianluca Pegolo
92	FW	FRA	Grégoire Defrel

== Competitions ==
=== Serie A ===
==== League table ====
Pos	Team	Pld	W	D	L	GF	GA	GD	Pts	Qualification or relegation
4	Internazionale	38	20	7	11	50	38	+12	67	Qualification to Europa League group stage (Note: Since the winners of the 2015–16 Coppa Italia, Juventus, qualified for European competition based on league position, the spot awarded to the cup winners (Europa League group stage) was passed to fifth-placed team and the spot awarded to the fifth-placed team (Europa League third qualifying round) was passed to the sixth-placed team.)
5	Fiorentina	38	18	10	10	60	42	+18	64	Qualification to Europa League group stage
6	Sassuolo	38	16	13	9	49	40	+9	61	Qualification to Europa League third qualifying round
7	Milan	38	15	12	11	49	43	+6	57	
8	Lazio	38	15	9	14	52	52	0	54	

Source: Serie A, Soccerway
Rules for classification: 1) Points; 2) Head-to-head points; 3) Head-to-head goal difference; 4) Goal difference; 5) Goals scored; 6) Draw.

==== Results summary ====
Overall								Home						Away					
Pld	W	D	L	GF	GA	GD	Pts	W	D	L	GF	GA	GD	W	D	L	GF	GA	GD
38	16	13	9	49	40	+9	61	8	8	3	25	20	+5	8	5	6	24	20	+4

Last updated: 14 May 2016.
Source: Competitive matches

==== Results by round ====
Round	1	2	3	4	5	6	7	8	9	10	11	12	13	14	15	16	17	18	19	20	21	22	23	24	25	26	27	28	29	30	31	32	33	34	35	36	37	38
Ground	H	A	H	A	A	H	A	H	A	H	A	H	A	H	A	H	A	H	A	A	H	A	H	H	A	H	A	H	A	H	A	H	A	H	A	H	A	H
Result	W	W	D	D	W	D	L	W	L	W	D	W	L	D	W	D	D	D	W	L	L	D	L	D	D	W	W	W	L	D	W	L	L	D	W	W	W	W
Position	5	4	6	5	3	4	8	5	6	5	5	5	5	6	6	7	6	6	6	7	7	7	7	7	8	7	7	7	7	7	7	7	7	7	7	6	6	6

Updated to match(es) played on 14 May 2016. Source: Competitive matches
A = Away; H = Home; W = Win; D = Draw; L = Loss

==== Matches ====
23 August 2015 1	Sassuolo	2–1	Napoli	Reggio Emilia
20:45 CEST (UTC+02:00)	Magnanelli (yellow card) 4'; Floro Flores 32'; Berardi (yellow card) 45'; Peluso (yellow card) 57'; Sansone 84', (yellow card) 86'	Report	Hamšík 3'; Chiricheș (yellow card) 18'; Valdifiori (yellow card) 39'	Stadium: Mapei Stadium – Città del Tricolore; Attendance: 13,755; Referee: Daniele Doveri

29 August 2015 2	Bologna	0–1	Sassuolo	Bologna
18:00 CEST (UTC+02:00)	Falco (yellow card) 18'; Destro (yellow card) 26'; Ferrari (yellow card) 66'	Report	Cannavaro (yellow card) 24'; Floro Flores 86'	Stadium: Stadio Renato Dall'Ara; Attendance: 15,732; Referee: Carmine Russo

13 September 2015 3	Sassuolo	2–2	Atalanta	Reggio Emilia
15:00 CEST (UTC+02:00)	Magnanelli 22'; Duncan (yellow card) 26'; Floro Flores 41'; Sansone (yellow card) 61'; Vrsaljko (yellow card) 83' (yellow-red card) 84'; Missiroli (yellow card) 89'	Report	Cherubin (yellow card) 6'; Pinilla 13', 33', (yellow card) 38' (yellow-red card) 48'; Paletta (yellow card) 19'; Bellini (yellow card) 23'; Toloi (yellow card) 90+2'	Stadium: Mapei Stadium – Città del Tricolore; Attendance: 8,644; Referee: Maurizio Mariani

20 September 2015 4	Roma	2–2	Sassuolo	Rome
15:00 CEST (UTC+02:00)	Totti 36'; Salah 49'; Maicon (yellow card) 57'; De Rossi (yellow card) 73'	Report	Defrel 22'; Politano (yellow card) 40', (goal) 45'; Sansone (yellow card) 86'; Peluso (yellow card) 88'	Stadium: Stadio Olimpico; Attendance: 36,727; Referee: Davide Massa

23 September 2015 5	Palermo	0–1	Sassuolo	Palermo
20:45 CEST (UTC+02:00)	Rigoni (yellow card) 43' (yellow-red card) 85'	Report	Missiroli (yellow card) 31'; Floccari 35'; Vrsaljko (yellow card) 61'; Acerbi (yellow card) 68'; Cannavaro (yellow card) 72'; Biondini (yellow card) 77'; Magnanelli (yellow card) 83'	Stadium: Stadio Renzo Barbera; Attendance: 17,730; Referee: Luca Pairetto

27 September 2015 6	Sassuolo	1–1	Chievo	Reggio Emilia
15:00 CEST (UTC+02:00)	Defrel 3'; Peluso (yellow card) 12'; Magnanelli (yellow card) 56'; Berardi (yellow card) 64'	Report	Paloschi 24'; Hetemaj (yellow card) 43'	Stadium: Mapei Stadium – Città del Tricolore; Attendance: 7,500; Referee: Michael Fabbri

4 October 2015 7	Empoli	1–0	Sassuolo	Empoli
12:30 CEST (UTC+02:00)	Zieliński (yellow card) 16' (yellow-red card) 90'; Tonelli (yellow card) 26'; Maccarone 88'; Krunić (yellow card) 90+2'	Report	Terranova (yellow card) 17'; Peluso (yellow card) 36'; Vrsaljko (yellow card) 72'	Stadium: Stadio Carlo Castellani; Attendance: 7,634; Referee: Gianpaolo Calvarese

18 October 2015 8	Sassuolo	2–1	Lazio	Reggio Emilia
15:00 CEST (UTC+02:00)	Berardi 7' (pen.); Sansone (yellow card) 44'; Missiroli 60'	Report	Lulić (yellow card) 7'; Milinković-Savić (yellow card) 20'; Anderson 67'; Cataldi (yellow card) 75' (yellow-red card) 90+3'; Maurício (yellow card) 85'	Stadium: Mapei Stadium – Città del Tricolore; Attendance: 11,812; Referee: Marco Guida

25 October 2015 9	Milan	2–1	Sassuolo	Milan
15:00 CET (UTC+01:00)	Bacca 31' (pen.); Abate (yellow card) 33'; Luiz Adriano 86'	Report	Consigli (red card) 30'; Berardi (yellow card) 31', (goal) 53'; Cannavaro (yellow card) 71'; Missiroli (yellow card) 87'	Stadium: San Siro; Attendance: 37,568; Referee: Gianluca Rocchi

28 October 2015 10	Sassuolo	1–0	Juventus	Reggio Emilia
20:45 CET (UTC+01:00)	Peluso (yellow card) 13'; Sansone 20', (yellow card) 90+4'; Pegolo (yellow card) 60'; Berardi (yellow card) 68'; Cannavaro (yellow card) 82'	Report	Chiellini (yellow card) 4' (yellow-red card) 39'; Lemina (yellow card) 18'; Pogba (yellow card) 77'	Stadium: Mapei Stadium – Città del Tricolore; Attendance: 20,570; Referee: Andrea Gervasoni

1 November 2015 11	Udinese	0–0	Sassuolo	Udine
15:00 CET (UTC+01:00)	Danilo (yellow card) 11'	Report	Missiroli (yellow card) 5'; Biondini (yellow card) 22'	Stadium: Stadio Friuli; Attendance: 13,277; Referee: Federico La Penna

8 November 2015 12	Sassuolo	1–0	Carpi	Reggio Emilia
15:00 CET (UTC+01:00)	Falcinelli (yellow card) 23'; Sansone 28'; Pellegrini (yellow card) 58'; Biondini (yellow card) 66'; Consigli (yellow card) 85'	Report	Marrone (yellow card) 27'; Lollo (yellow card) 57'; Zaccardo (yellow card) 64'; Di Gaudio (yellow card) 73'; Wallace (yellow card) 90+2'	Stadium: Mapei Stadium – Città del Tricolore; Attendance: 10,264; Referee: Paolo Valeri

22 November 2015 13	Genoa	2–1	Sassuolo	Genoa
15:00 CET (UTC+01:00)	Rincón (yellow card) 25', (goal) 51'; Perin (yellow card) 42'; Perotti (red card) 42'; Burdisso (yellow card) 88'; Pavoletti 90+5'	Report	Berardi (red card) 41'; Acerbi 90+3'	Stadium: Stadio Luigi Ferraris; Attendance: 19,347; Referee: Nicola Rizzoli

30 November 2015 14	Sassuolo	1–1	Fiorentina	Reggio Emilia
19:00 CET (UTC+01:00)	Floccari 42', (yellow card) 53'; Vrsaljko (yellow card) 56'	Report	Valero 5'; Badelj (yellow card) 66'	Stadium: Mapei Stadium – Città del Tricolore; Attendance: 13,633; Referee: Davide Massa

6 December 2015 15	Sampdoria	1–3	Sassuolo	Genoa
18:00 CET (UTC+01:00)	Silvestre (yellow card) 84'; Zukanović 90'; Cassani (yellow card) 90+3'	Report	Acerbi 8', (yellow card) 17'; Floccari 27'; Vrsaljko (yellow card) 29'; Pellegrini 39', (yellow card) 43'	Stadium: Stadio Luigi Ferraris; Attendance: 20,581; Referee: Maurizio Mariani

20 December 2015 17	Hellas Verona	1–1	Sassuolo	Verona
15:00 CET (UTC+01:00)	Hallfreðsson (yellow card) 1'; Toni 39'; Sala (yellow card) 50'	Report	Missiroli (yellow card) 5'; Floccari 35'	Stadium: Stadio Marc'Antonio Bentegodi; Attendance: 16,949; Referee: Marco Guida

6 January 2016 18	Sassuolo	2–2	Frosinone	Reggio Emilia
15:00 CET (UTC+01:00)	Ajeti 22' (o.g.); Pellegrini (yellow card) 32' (yellow-red card) 90+3'; Peluso (yellow card) 44'; Falcinelli 75'	Report	Dionisi 16'; Ajeti 45'; Leali (yellow card) 73'; Pavlović (yellow card) 79'	Stadium: Mapei Stadium – Città del Tricolore; Attendance: 8,850; Referee: Luca Pairetto

10 January 2016 19	Internazionale	0–1	Sassuolo	Milan
12:30 CET (UTC+01:00)	Murillo (yellow card) 34'; Miranda (yellow card) 90+4'	Report	Cannavaro (yellow card) 67'; Magnanelli (yellow card) 82'; Berardi 90+5' (pen.)	Stadium: San Siro; Attendance: 40,322; Referee: Daniele Doveri

16 January 2016 20	Napoli	3–1	Sassuolo	Naples
20:45 CET (UTC+01:00)	Callejón 19'; Higuaín 42', 90+3'	Report	Falcinelli 3' (pen.); Acerbi (yellow card) 88'	Stadium: Stadio San Paolo; Attendance: 40,047; Referee: Piero Giacomelli

20 January 2016 16	Sassuolo	1–1	Torino	Reggio Emilia
20:45 CET (UTC+01:00)	Acerbi 40'; Vrsaljko (yellow card) 83'; Magnanelli (yellow card) 86'	Report	Belotti 22'; Benassi (yellow card) 58'; Glik (yellow card) 70'; Maksimović (yellow card) 78'; Acquah (yellow card) 90+2'	Stadium: Mapei Stadium – Città del Tricolore; Attendance: 7,000; Referee: Domenico Celi
Note: Postponed to 20 January 2016 due to heavy fog.

24 January 2016 21	Sassuolo	0–2	Bologna	Reggio Emilia
15:00 CET (UTC+01:00)		Report	Giaccherini 68'; Ferrari (yellow card) 87'; Brighi (yellow card) 90+1'; Floccari 90+4'	Stadium: Mapei Stadium – Città del Tricolore; Attendance: 12,202; Referee: Angelo Cervellera

30 January 2016 22	Atalanta	1–1	Sassuolo	Bergamo
18:00 CET (UTC+01:00)	Conti (yellow card) 25'; Denis 32'; Diamanti (yellow card) 69'	Report	Berardi 27', (yellow card) 33'; Consigli (yellow card) 32'; Defrel (yellow card) 66'; Longhi (yellow card) 70'	Stadium: Stadio Atleti Azzurri d'Italia; Attendance: 13,640; Referee: Claudio Gavillucci

2 February 2016 23	Sassuolo	0–2	Roma	Reggio Emilia
20:45 CET (UTC+01:00)	Duncan (yellow card) 76'	Report	Salah 11'; Keita (yellow card) 30'; Nainggolan (yellow card) 73' (yellow-red card) 87'; Vainqueur (yellow card) 90+1'; El Shaarawy 90+4'	Stadium: Mapei Stadium – Città del Tricolore; Attendance: 11,102; Referee: Gianpaolo Calvarese

7 February 2016 24	Sassuolo	2–2	Palermo	Reggio Emilia
15:00 CET (UTC+01:00)	Antei (yellow card) 43'; Defrel 45+1'; Missiroli 50'; Pellegrini (yellow card) 55'; Gazzola (yellow card) 73'	Report	Vázquez 30'; Lazaar (yellow card) 40' (yellow-red card) 75'; Đurđević 53'	Stadium: Mapei Stadium – Città del Tricolore; Attendance: 8,719; Referee: Maurizio Mariani

13 February 2016 25	Chievo	1–1	Sassuolo	Verona
18:00 CET (UTC+01:00)	Rigoni (yellow card) 23'; Radovanović (yellow card) 25'; Birsa (yellow card) 25', (goal) 29' (pen.)	Report	Peluso (yellow card) 28'; Sansone 30'; Missiroli (yellow card) 59'	Stadium: Stadio Marc'Antonio Bentegodi; Attendance: 8,500; Referee: Davide Ghersini

21 February 2016 26	Sassuolo	3–2	Empoli	Reggio Emilia
15:00 CET (UTC+01:00)	Missiroli (yellow card) 14' (yellow-red card) 31'; Berardi 41'; Defrel 48', 50'; Peluso (yellow card) 69'	Report	Tonelli (yellow card) 10' (yellow-red card) 38'; Zieliński 36'; Saponara (yellow card) 53'; Maccarone 70' (pen.)	Stadium: Mapei Stadium – Città del Tricolore; Attendance: 10,243; Referee: Paolo Valeri

29 February 2016 27	Lazio	0–2	Sassuolo	Rome
19:00 CET (UTC+01:00)	Maurício (yellow card) 40'	Report	Magnanelli (yellow card) 20'; Berardi 41' (pen.); Consigli (yellow card) 58'; Defrel 67'	Stadium: Stadio Olimpico; Attendance: 13,995; Referee: Antonio Damato

6 March 2016 28	Sassuolo	2−0	Milan	Reggio Emilia
15:00 CET (UTC+01:00)	Berardi (yellow card) 5'; Duncan 27'; Defrel (yellow card) 64' (yellow-red card) 77'; Sansone 72'	Report	Bonaventura (yellow card) 1'; Bertolacci (yellow card) 87'	Stadium: Mapei Stadium – Città del Tricolore; Attendance: 17,697; Referee: Piero Giacomelli

11 March 2016 29	Juventus	1–0	Sassuolo	Turin
20:45 CET (UTC+01:00)	Dybala 36'	Report	Duncan (yellow card) 23'; Sansone (yellow card) 41'; Vrsaljko (yellow card) 55'	Stadium: Juventus Stadium; Attendance: 39,240; Referee: Domenico Celi

20 March 2016 30	Sassuolo	1–1	Udinese	Reggio Emilia
15:00 CET (UTC+01:00)	Antei (yellow card) 13'; Politano 64'; Defrel (yellow card) 67'	Report	Zapata 8'; Heurtaux (yellow card) 9'; Hallfreðsson (yellow card) 32'; Felipe (yellow card) 83'; Danilo (yellow card) 88'	Stadium: Mapei Stadium – Città del Tricolore; Attendance: 10,344; Referee: Marco Di Bello

2 April 2016 31	Carpi	1–3	Sassuolo	Modena
18:00 CEST (UTC+02:00)	Gagliolo (yellow card) 21', (goal) 25'; Bianco (yellow card) 40'; Verdi (yellow card) 89'	Report	Sansone 4', (yellow card) 75'; Magnanelli (yellow card) 24'; Defrel 35'; Vrsaljko (yellow card) 55'; Acerbi 73'	Stadium: Stadio Alberto Braglia; Attendance: 7,457; Referee: Angelo Cervellera

9 April 2016 32	Sassuolo	0–1	Genoa	Reggio Emilia
18:00 CEST (UTC+02:00)	Duncan (yellow card) 76'; Politano (yellow card) 88'	Report	Džemaili 42'; Muñoz (yellow card) 55'	Stadium: Mapei Stadium – Città del Tricolore; Attendance: 10,249; Referee: Claudio Gavillucci

17 April 2016 33	Fiorentina	3–1	Sassuolo	Florence
15:00 CEST (UTC+02:00)	Gonzalo 10'; Iličić 57'; Tello (yellow card) 59'; Consigli 83' (o.g.)	Report	Vrsaljko (yellow card) 35'; Peluso (yellow card) 45'; Berardi 55', (yellow card) 86'	Stadium: Stadio Artemio Franchi; Attendance: 27,585; Referee: Luca Banti

20 April 2016 34	Sassuolo	0–0	Sampdoria	Reggio Emilia
18:30 CEST (UTC+02:00)	Cannavaro (yellow card) 36'; Sansone (yellow card) 44'; Pellegrini (yellow card) 63'; Berardi (yellow card) 81'	Report	Diakité (yellow card) 18'; Dodô (yellow card) 19'; Ranocchia (yellow card) 22' (yellow-red card) 27'; Krstičić (yellow card) 88'	Stadium: Mapei Stadium – Città del Tricolore; Attendance: 9,392; Referee: Maurizio Mariani

24 April 2016 35	Torino	1–3	Sassuolo	Turin
15:00 CEST (UTC+02:00)	Peres 7'; Gazzi (yellow card) 87'; Moretti (yellow card) 88'	Report	Sansone 2'; Peluso (yellow card) 21', (goal) 75'; Trotta 90+4'	Stadium: Stadio Olimpico di Torino; Attendance: 19,751; Referee: Michael Fabbri

1 May 2016 36	Sassuolo	1–0	Hellas Verona	Reggio Emilia
15:00 CEST (UTC+02:00)	Pellegrini 58'	Report	Albertazzi (yellow card) 39'	Stadium: Mapei Stadium – Città del Tricolore; Attendance: 10,389; Referee: Claudio Gavillucci

8 May 2016 37	Frosinone	0–1	Sassuolo	Frosinone
15:00 CET (UTC+01:00)	Gucher (yellow card) 16'; Kragl (yellow card) 32'; Dionisi (yellow card) 81'; Crivello (yellow card) 86'	Report	Peluso (yellow card) 14'; Cannavaro (yellow card) 55'; Berardi (yellow card) 81'; Politano 85', (yellow card) 86'	Stadium: Stadio Matusa; Attendance: 6,014; Referee: Angelo Cervellera

15 May 2016 38	Sassuolo	3–1	Internazionale	Reggio Emilia
15:00 CEST (UTC+02:00)	Politano 6', 39'; Pellegrini 26'; Magnanelli (yellow card) 31'; Duncan (yellow card) 66'; Cannavaro (yellow card) 85'	Report	Telles (yellow card) 22'; Palacio 32'; Brozović (yellow card) 55'; Murillo (yellow card) 59' (yellow-red card) 59'; Juan Jesus (yellow card) 66'	Stadium: Mapei Stadium – Città del Tricolore; Referee: Andrea Gervasoni

=== Coppa Italia ===
15 August 2015 Third round	Sassuolo	2–0	Modena	Reggio Emilia
20:30 CEST (UTC+02:00)	Falcinelli 53'; Floro Flores 66'	Report		Stadium: Mapei Stadium – Città del Tricolore; Attendance: 2,329; Referee: Gianpaolo Calvarese

3 December 2015 Fourth round	Sassuolo	0–1	Cagliari	Reggio Emilia
21:00 CET (UTC+01:00)	Politano (yellow card) 90+4'	Report	Sau (yellow card) 18', (goal) 36'; Cragno (yellow card) 76'; Benedetti (yellow card) 90+5'; Colombatto (yellow card) 90+6'	Stadium: Mapei Stadium – Città del Tricolore; Attendance: 2,071; Referee: Claudio Gavillucci

== Statistics ==
=== Appearances and goals ===
No.	Pos	Nat	Player	Total		Serie A		Coppa Italia	
No.	Pos	Nat	Player	Apps	Goals	Apps	Goals	Apps	Goals
Goalkeepers
1	GK	(Italy) ITA	Alberto Pomini	0	0	0	0	0	0
47	GK	(Italy) ITA	Andrea Consigli	38	0	37	0	1	0
79	GK	(Italy) ITA	Gianluca Pegolo	3	0	1+1	0	1	0
Defenders
3	DF	(Italy) ITA	Alessandro Longhi	8	0	4+2	0	1+1	0
5	DF	(Italy) ITA	Luca Antei	5	0	4+1	0	0	0
11	DF	(Croatia) CRO	Šime Vrsaljko	36	0	35	0	1	0
13	DF	(Italy) ITA	Federico Peluso	36	1	34	1	1+1	0
15	DF	(Italy) ITA	Francesco Acerbi	38	4	36	4	2	0
23	DF	(Italy) ITA	Marcello Gazzola	10	0	4+5	0	1	0
26	DF	(Italy) ITA	Emanuele Terranova	6	0	3+3	0	0	0
28	DF	(Italy) ITA	Paolo Cannavaro	32	0	30+1	0	1	0
98	DF	(Ghana) GHA	Claud Adjapong	2	0	0+2	0	0	0
Midfielders
4	MF	(Italy) ITA	Francesco Magnanelli	35	1	34	1	1	0
6	MF	(Italy) ITA	Lorenzo Pellegrini	20	3	13+6	3	1	0
7	MF	(Italy) ITA	Simone Missiroli	25	2	22+2	2	1	0
8	MF	(Italy) ITA	Davide Biondini	23	0	12+10	0	1	0
10	MF	(Italy) ITA	Karim Laribi	11	0	6+5	0	0	0
32	MF	(Ghana) GHA	Alfred Duncan	35	1	27+6	1	2	0
Forwards
9	FW	(Italy) ITA	Diego Falcinelli	28	3	11+15	2	2	1
16	FW	(Italy) ITA	Matteo Politano	29	5	11+17	5	0+1	0
17	FW	(Italy) ITA	Nicola Sansone	38	7	28+9	7	1	0
25	FW	(Italy) ITA	Domenico Berardi	31	7	26+3	7	2	0
29	FW	(Italy) ITA	Marcello Trotta	8	1	1+7	1	0	0
92	FW	(France) FRA	Grégoire Defrel	35	7	24+9	7	0+2	0
Players transferred out during the season
20	DF	(Italy) ITA	Lorenzo Ariaudo	5	0	2+2	0	1	0
83	FW	(Italy) ITA	Antonio Floro Flores	16	4	8+6	3	1+1	1
99	FW	(Italy) ITA	Sergio Floccari	7	4	5+2	4	0	0

Last updated: 14 May 2016
Source: Competitions

=== Goalscorers ===
Rank	No.	Pos	Nat	Name	Serie A	Coppa Italia	Total
1	17	FW	(Italy)	Nicola Sansone	7	0	7
1	25	FW	(Italy)	Domenico Berardi	7	0	7
1	92	FW	(France)	Grégoire Defrel	7	0	7
4	16	FW	(Italy)	Matteo Politano	5	0	5
5	15	DF	(Italy)	Francesco Acerbi	4	0	4
5	83	FW	(Italy)	Antonio Floro Flores	3	1	4
5	99	FW	(Italy)	Sergio Floccari	4	0	4
8	6	MF	(Italy)	Lorenzo Pellegrini	3	0	3
8	9	FW	(Italy)	Diego Falcinelli	2	1	3
10	7	MF	(Italy)	Simone Missiroli	2	0	2
11	4	MF	(Italy)	Francesco Magnanelli	1	0	1
11	13	DF	(Italy)	Federico Peluso	1	0	1
11	29	FW	(Italy)	Marcello Trotta	1	0	1
11	32	MF	(Ghana)	Alfred Duncan	1	0	1
Own goal					2	0	1
Totals					49	2	51

Last updated: 14 May 2016

=== Clean sheets ===
Rank	No.	Pos	Nat	Name	Serie A	Coppa Italia	Total
1	47	GK	(Italy)	Andrea Consigli	10	1	11
Totals					10	1	11

Last updated: 8 May 2016
