= Massimo Zappino =

Brazilian footballer

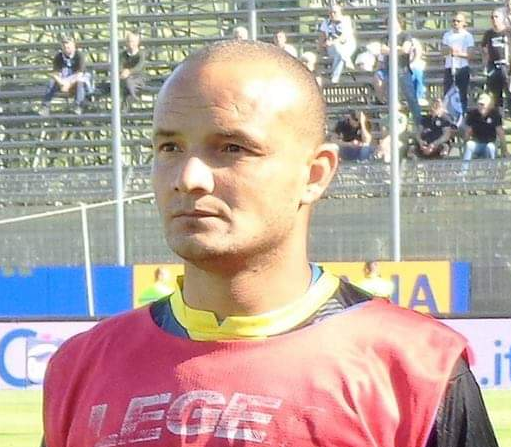
- Massimo Zappino with Frosinone in 2017

Personal information
- Full name: Massimo Zenildo Zappino
- Date of birth: 12 June 1981 (age 45)
- Place of birth: Pesqueira, Brazil
- Height: 1.90 m (6 ft 3 in)
- Position: Goalkeeper

Senior career*
Years	Team	Apps	(Gls)
2000–2001	Catania	0	(0)
2001	Acireale	0	(0)
2002–2004	Nocerina	27	(0)
2004–2008	Frosinone	81	(0)
2007	→ Chievo (loan)	0	(0)
2008	→ Pro Sesto (loan)	14	(0)
2008–2009	Foggia	0	(0)
2009	→ Lecco (loan)	14	(0)
2009	Taranto	0	(0)
2009–2010	Como	13	(0)
2010–2011	Varese	35	(0)
2012–2018	Frosinone	101	(0)
Total		289	(0)
- * Club domestic league appearances and goals

Massimo Zenildo Zappino (born 12 June 1981) is a Brazilian former footballer who played as a goalkeeper.

He also holds an Italian passport.

== Playing career ==
In summer 2007, he was exchanged with Vincenzo Sicignano but failed to make permanent move. In summer 2008 he was signed by Foggia in exchange with Nunzio Di Roberto to Frosinone In June Foggia acquired the remaining 50% registration rights from Frosinone.

In July 2009 he signed a 2-year contract with Taranto as the joint-ownership bid accepted. It changed to definitive deal in late July. He then left for Como on free transfer.

On 2 September 2010 he joined Serie B club Varese He was the first choice keeper. The team finished fourth but failed to win the promotion playoffs.

On 1 November 2015 he made his debut in Serie A with Frosinone, eventually conceding 4 goals to Fiorentina.

After leaving Frosinone in 2018, he shortly joined Promozione amateur club Siracusa in 2019, being released just a few weeks after his signing due to physical and fitness problems, with no first team appearances.

== Coaching career ==
After retiring as a player, Zappino stayed on in Syracuse and started a career as a goalkeeping coach and scout.

In 2022, he was hired as the new goalkeeping coach of Eccellenza Sicily amateurs Real Siracusa.

== Personal life ==
Zappino was born in Pesqueira, Brazil to a poor family, and then successively adopted by an Italian family from Syracuse, Sicily.

== Career statistics ==
Appearances and goals by club, season and competition
Club	Season	League			National cup		Other		Total	
Club	Season	Division	Apps	Goals	Apps	Goals	Apps	Goals	Apps	Goals
Catania	2000–01	Serie C1	0	0	0	0	—		0	0
Acireale	2001–02	Serie C2	0	0	0	0				
Nocerina	2001–02	Serie C1	2	0	—		0	0	2	0
Nocerina	2002–03	Serie C1	0	0	0	0	—		0	0
Nocerina	2003–04	Serie C1	25	0	0	0	—		25	0
Nocerina	Total		27	0	0	0	0	0	27	0
Frosinone	2004–05	Serie C1	15	0	2	0	2	0	19	0
Frosinone	2005–06	Serie C1	31	0	1	0	4	0	36	0
Frosinone	2006–07	Serie B	29	0	1	0	—		30	0
Frosinone	Total		75	0	4	0	6	0	85	0
Chievo (loan)	2007–08	Serie B	0	0	0	0	—		0	0
Pro Sesto (loan)	2007–08	Serie C1	14	0	—		—		14	0
Foggia	2008–09	Lega Pro 1D	0	0	1	0	—		1	0
Lecco (loan)	2008–09	Lega Pro 1D	14	0	—		2	0	16	0
Como	2009–10	Lega Pro 1D	15	0	2	0	—		17	0
Varese	2010–11	Serie B	33	0	0	0	2	0	35	0
Frosinone	2011–12	Lega Pro 1D	12	0	—		—		12	0
Frosinone	2012–13	Lega Pro 1D	25	0	0	0	—		25	0
Frosinone	2013–14	Lega Pro 1D	26	0	4	0	5	0	35	0
Frosinone	2014–15	Serie B	25	0	1	0	—		26	0
Frosinone	2015–16	Serie A	4	0	0	0	—		4	0
Frosinone	2016–17	Serie B	3	0	1	0	0	0	4	0
Frosinone	2017–18	Serie B	1	0	2	0	—		3	0
Frosinone	Total		96	0	8	0	5	0	109	0
Career total			274	0	2	0	15	0	291	0

== Honours ==
Frosinone

- Serie C1 runner-up and promotion playoff winner: 2006
