= Salvatore Aurelio =

Italian footballer

Personal information
- Date of birth: 15 January 1986 (age 40)
- Place of birth: Naples, Italy
- Height: 1.74 m (5 ft 9 in)
- Position: Winger

Youth career
- 2002–2004: Genoa

Senior career*
Years	Team	Apps	(Gls)
2004–2009	Genoa	5	(0)
2004–2005	→ Carrarese (loan)	34	(4)
2005–2006	→ Verona (loan)	28	(0)
2007	→ Lucchese (loan)	10	(0)
2007–2008	→ Cesena (loan)	1	(0)
2008–2009	→ Crotone (loan)	30	(0)
2009–2014	Frosinone	101	(10)
2011	→ Salernitana (loan)	9	(1)
2014–2015	AlbinoLeffe	24	(0)
2015	Paganese	15	(1)
2015	Lavagnese	7	(1)
2015–2017	Vado	20	(8)
2017–2019	Arenzano		
2019–2020	Vado	0	(0)
2020–2021	USD Legino 1910		
2021–2022	Old Boys Rensen		
2022–2023	ASD Praese 1945		
Total		284	(25)

International career
2001–2002	Italy U16	5	(0)
2002	Italy U17	9	(3)
2006	Italy U20	1	(1)
- * Club domestic league appearances and goals

Salvatore Aurelio (born 15 January 1986) is an Italian former footballer who plays as a winger.

== Club career ==
=== Genoa and loans ===
A youth product of Genoa C.F.C., he played on loan with Carrarese (Serie C2, also in co-ownership deal) and Verona (Serie B).

He joined the first team in the 2006–07 season, but in January left on loan to Lucchese (Serie C1), due to new strikers being signed.

After Genoa won a promotion to Serie A, Aurelio became surplus to the team and was sold to A.C. Cesena in co-ownership deal in late June, for €0.5 million (also part of Papa Waigo's deal).

He then bought back by Genoa for just €1,000 and loaned him to Crotone, as part of Felice Natalino's deal.

=== Frosinone ===
In June 2009, Aurelio was sold to Frosinone in co-ownership deal, for €800,000. In the same month Genoa signed Salvatore Bocchetti outright for another €2.3 million.

On 24 June 2010, the club signed him outright along with Diogo Tavares, co-currently, Robert Gucher joined Genoa. At that time half of the registration rights of Aurelio was valued €800,000, while Tavares was valued €600,000 and lastly Gucher for €1.3 million. Moreover, Selim Ben Djemia's loan had cost Fronisone €100,000 and Gucher had cost Geona €200,000, made Genoa nor Fronisone owe more money to opposite side.

In January 2011 he left for Lega Pro Prima Divisione club Salernitana in temporary deal, with Manolo Pestrin moved to opposite direction. He only played 3 Serie B games for Frosinone in the first half of 2010–11 Serie B. In 2011 Frosinone relegated to the same division, as well as the bankruptcy of Salernitana.

Aurelio spent 2 1/2 seasons with Fronisone in the third division.

=== AlbinoLeffe ===
On 31 January 2014 Aurelio left for fellow Prima Divisione club AlbinoLeffe, with Alessio Viola moved to opposite direction. Fronisone promoted to Serie B while AlbinoLeffe losing the promotion playoffs.

== International career ==
Aurelio was a member of the Italy Under-17 side during the 2003 UEFA European Under-17 Championship first qualifying round. However he was dropped out from the squad in the second qualifying round as well as in the finals.
