= Matteo Ciofani =

Italian footballer

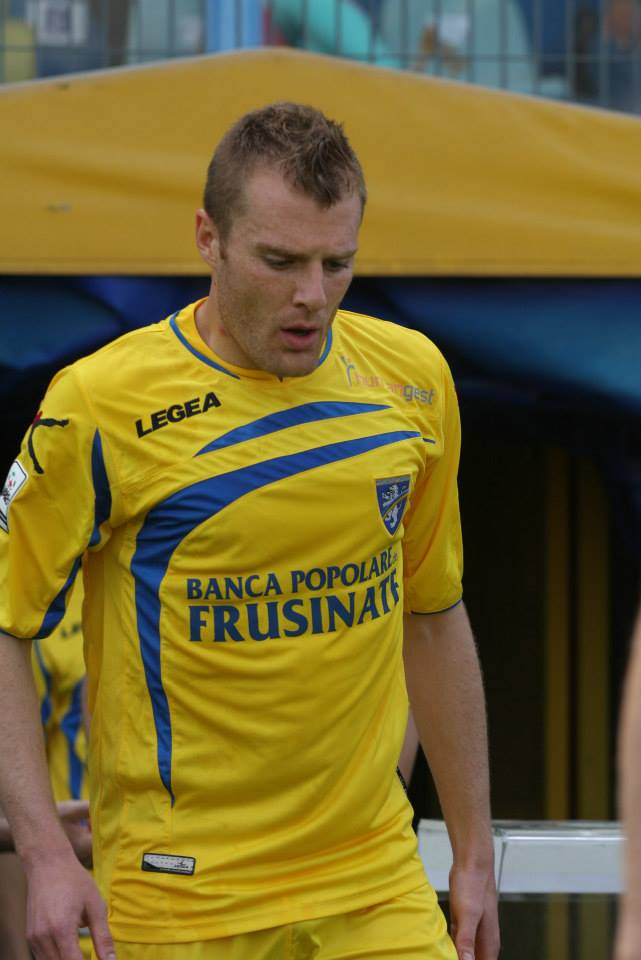
- Matteo Ciofani with Frosinone in 2014

Personal information
- Date of birth: 26 February 1988 (age 38)
- Place of birth: Avezzano, Italy
- Height: 1.83 m (6 ft 0 in)
- Position: Right-back

Senior career*
Years	Team	Apps	(Gls)
2007–2008	Pescara	5	(0)
2008	→ Bitonto (loan)	9	(0)
2008–2009	RC Angolana	32	(2)
2009–2012	Ascoli	70	(2)
2012–2013	Ternana	11	(0)
2013–2018	Frosinone	142	(6)
2018–2020	Pescara	35	(2)
2020–2021	Bari	33	(3)
2021–2022	Modena	33	(1)
2022–2024	Triestina	51	(0)
- * Club domestic league appearances and goals

Matteo Ciofani (born 26 February 1988) is an Italian former footballer who played as a defender.

== Club career ==
Born in Avezzano, Abruzzo, Ciofani started his professional career at local side Pescara.

Ciofani made his Serie B debut on 5 May 2007. He started a match that ended in 3–2 in a loss to Crotone. He followed the team towards relegated to Serie C1 and was subsequently loaned out to Serie D side Bitonto in January 2008.

In the summer of 2008, Ciofani left for Serie D side RC Angolana. He made 32 league appearances for the Serie D side and then signed for Serie B side Ascoli in June 2009.

On 1 November 2012, Serie B side Ternana announced they had signed Ciofani until June 2013.

On 16 August 2018, Ciofani signed with Serie B team Pescara.

On 29 January 2020, he moved to Serie C club Bari.

On 1 July 2021, he signed a two-year contract with Modena.

On 24 August 2022, Ciofani moved to Triestina on a two-year contract.

== Personal life ==
Matteo Ciofani's brother, Daniel, is also a professional footballer and was his teammate at Frosinone between 2013 and 2018.

== Career statistics ==
=== Club ===
As of match played 20 February 2022

Appearances and goals by club, season and competition
Club	Season	League			National Cup		League Cup		Other		Total	
Club	Season	Division	Apps	Goals	Apps	Goals	Apps	Goals	Apps	Goals	Apps	Goals
Pescara	2006–07	Serie B	4	0	0	0	—		—		4	0
Pescara	2007–08	Serie C1	1	0	0	0	—		—		1	0
Pescara	Total		5	0	0	0	0	0	0	0	5	0
Bitonto (loan)	2007–08	Serie D	9	0	0	0	—		—		9	0
RC Angolana	2008–09	Serie D	32	2	0	0	—		—		32	2
Ascoli	2009–10	Serie B	15	0	1	0	—		—		16	0
Ascoli	2010–11	Serie B	25	1	2	0	—		—		27	1
Ascoli	2011–12	Serie B	30	1	2	0	—		—		32	1
Ascoli	Total		70	2	5	0	0	0	0	0	75	2
Ternana	2012–13	Serie B	11	0	0	0	—		—		11	0
Frosinone	2013–14	Lega Pro 1	27	1	4	0	1	0	5 (Note: Appearance(s) in Promotion Playoffs)	0	37	1
Frosinone	2014–15	Serie B	29	1	1	0	—		—		30	1
Frosinone	2015–16	Serie A	18	0	0	0	—		—		18	0
Frosinone	2016–17	Serie B	29	1	0	0	—		2	0	31	1
Frosinone	2017–18	Serie B	39	3	2	0	—		4	0	45	3
Frosinone	Total		142	6	7	0	1	0	11	0	161	6
Pescara	2018–19	Serie B	24	1	0	0	—		0	0	24	1
Pescara	2019–20	Serie B	11	1	0	0	—		—		11	1
Pescara	Total		35	2	0	0	0	0	0	0	35	2
Bari	2019–20	Serie C	7	1	—		—		3	0	10	1
Bari	2020–21	Serie C	26	2	2	0	—		3	0	31	2
Bari	Total		33	3	2	0	0	0	6	0	41	3
Modena	2021–22	Serie C	25	0	0	0	2	0	—		27	0
Career total			362	15	14	0	3	0	17	0	396	15
