= Oliver Kragl =

German footballer (born 1990)

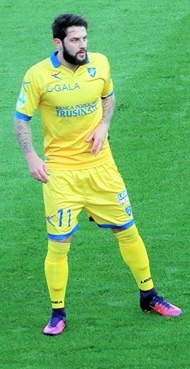
- Kragl with Frosinone in 2016

Personal information
- Date of birth: 12 May 1990 (age 36)
- Place of birth: Wolfsburg, West Germany
- Height: 1.79 m (5 ft 10 in)
- Position: Midfielder

Team information
- Current team: Nissa

Youth career
- TSV Wolfsburg
- TV Jahn Wolfsburg
- –2009: VfL Wolfsburg

Senior career*
Years	Team	Apps	(Gls)
2009–2011	Eintracht Braunschweig II	25	(6)
2009–2011	Eintracht Braunschweig	17	(2)
2011–2012	VfB Germania Halberstadt	31	(5)
2012–2013	SV Babelsberg 03	35	(3)
2013–2016	SV Ried	85	(12)
2016–2017	Frosinone	43	(4)
2017–2018	Crotone	5	(0)
2018	→ Foggia (loan)	20	(6)
2018–2019	Foggia	33	(7)
2019–2021	Benevento	27	(5)
2020–2021	→ Ascoli (loan)	21	(1)
2022	Avellino	13	(3)
2022	SV Ried	5	(0)
2023	Messina	13	(3)
2023–2024	Trapani	28	(13)
2024–2025	Fidelis Andria	24	(9)
2025	Trapani	5	(1)
2025–	Nissa	0	(0)
- * Club domestic league appearances and goals as of 21 July 2025

Oliver Kragl (born 12 May 1990) is a German professional footballer who plays as a midfielder for Italian Serie D club Nissa.

== Career ==
Kragl made and scored on his professional debut for Eintracht Braunschweig during the 2009–10 3. Liga season in a 2–1 home win over FC Ingolstadt 04. He made 16 appearances for Braunschweig during his debut season, scoring two goals. Due to injury problems, Kragl only made one further appearance for the club during the 2010–11 season and subsequently left Braunschweig in the summer of 2011 to join Regionalliga side VfB Germania Halberstadt.

In June 2013, Kragl joined Austrian Bundesliga side SV Ried. He made his league debut on 20 July 2013 in a 0–0 draw with SV Grödig. He scored his first goal in the league on 3 August 2013 in a 3–3 draw against Austria Wien. The goal came in the 80th minute.

During the winter break of the 2015–16 season, he transferred to Italian club Frosinone. He made his league debut on 10 January 2016 in a 5–1 loss against Napoli. He was replaced by Raman Chibsah in the 62nd minute. He scored his first goal for the club in a 3–3 away draw to Milan on 1 May 2016.

On 5 July 2017, Kragl was signed by Crotone. He made his league debut on 27 August 2017 in a 0–0 draw with Hellas Verona. He was brought on in the 68th minute, replacing Adrian Stoian.

In January 2018, he moved to Serie B side Foggia on loan. He made his league debut on 20 January 2018 in a 1–0 loss to Pescara. His first goal for the club came just a week later in a 2–1 win over Virtus Entella. His goal, assisted by Leandro Greco, came in the 32nd minute. On 19 June 2018, Foggia exercised the option to make the transfer permanent.

Following Foggia's bankruptcy, on 16 July 2019, Kragl signed a three-year contract with Serie B club Benevento.

On 5 October 2020, he joined Serie B club Ascoli on loan. On 31 August 2021, his contract with Benevento was terminated by mutual consent.

On 2 February 2022, Kragl signed a contract with Avellino in Serie C until 30 June 2022, with automatic extension in case of promotion to Serie B.

After spending the first half of the 2022–23 season with SV Ried in Austria, on 11 January 2023 Kragl returned to Italy, joining Serie C club Messina.

After having been a protagonist in Messina's relegation escape in the second half of the club's 2022–23 Serie C campaign, Kragl left the Giallorossi later in August 2023 to join fellow Sicilian club Trapani in the Serie D league. He contributed to Trapani's promotion to Serie C for the 2024–25 season. On 28 August 2024, Kragl's contract with Trapani was terminated by mutual consent.

He successfully joined the Serie D club Fidelis Andria and served as a team captain before mutually agreeing to terminate his contract on 26 March 2025. Just a day later, he returned to Trapani, now in the Serie C. On 21 July 2025, Kragl terminated his contract with Trapani by mutual consent.

== Career statistics ==
=== Club ===
As of match played 30 May 2024

Appearances and goals by club, season and competition
Club	Season	League			National Cup		Other		Total	
Club	Season	Division	Apps	Goals	Apps	Goals	Apps	Goals	Apps	Goals
Eintracht Braunschweig II	2009–10	3. Liga	16	2	—		—		16	2
Eintracht Braunschweig II	2010–11	3. Liga	1	0	—		—		1	0
Eintracht Braunschweig II	Total		17	2	0	0	0	0	17	2
Eintracht Braunschweig	2009–10	Oberliga	15	6	—		—		15	6
Eintracht Braunschweig	2010–11	Regionalliga	10	0	—		—		10	0
Eintracht Braunschweig	Total		25	6	0	0	0	0	25	6
VfB Germania Halberstadt	2011–12	Regionalliga	31	5	—		—		31	5
SV Babelsberg 03	2012–13	3. Liga	35	3	—		—		35	3
SV Ried	2013–14	Austrian Bundesliga	34	8	3	0	—		37	8
SV Ried	2014–15	Austrian Bundesliga	32	3	2	0	—		34	3
SV Ried	2015–16	Austrian Bundesliga	19	1	3	1	—		22	2
SV Ried	Total		85	12	8	1	0	0	93	13
Frosinone	2015–16	Serie A	15	1	0	0	—		15	1
Frosinone	2016–17	Serie B	28	3	0	0	—		28	3
Frosinone	Total		43	4	0	0	0	0	43	4
Crotone	2017–18	Serie A	5	0	0	0	—		5	0
Foggia (loan)	2017–18	Serie B	20	6	0	0	—		20	6
Foggia	2018–19	Serie B	33	7	1	0	—		34	7
Foggia	Total		53	13	1	0	0	0	54	13
Benevento	2019–20	Serie B	27	5	1	0	—		28	5
Ascoli (loan)	2020–21	Serie B	21	1	0	0	—		21	1
Avellino	2021–22	Serie C	13	3	—		1 (Note: Appearance(s) in Serie C play-off)	0	14	3
SV Ried	2022–23	Austrian Bundesliga	5	0	1	1	—		6	1
Messina	2022–23	Serie C	13	3	—		2 (Note: Appearance(s) in Serie C play-out)	0	15	3
Trapani	2023–24	Serie D	28	13	6	1	—		34	14
Career total			401	67	17	3	3	0	421	73

== Honours ==
Benevento

- Serie B: 2019–20

Trapani

- Serie D: 2023–24 (Group I)
- Coppa Italia Serie D: 2023–24
