= Nicola Sansone =

Italian footballer (born 1991)

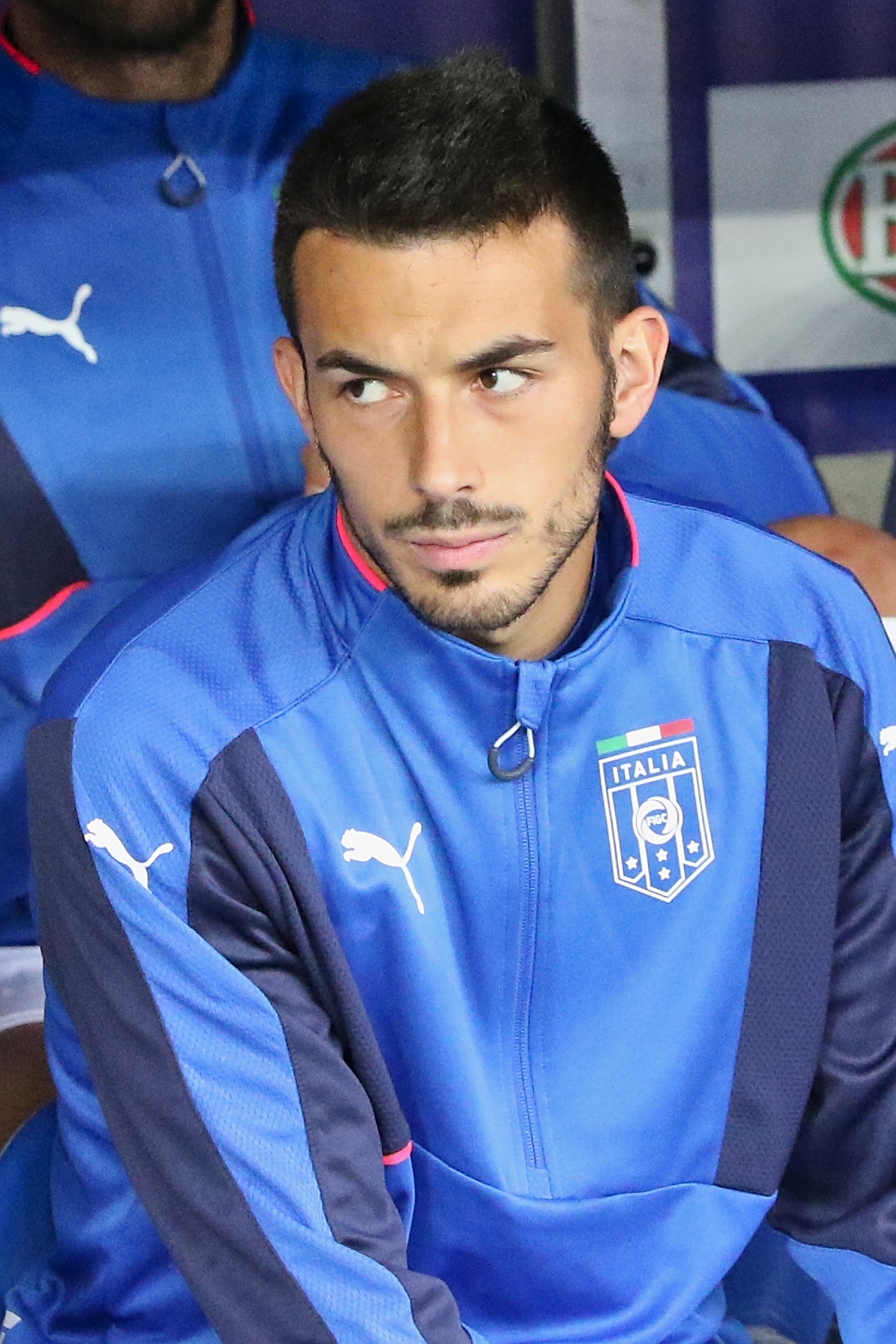
- Sansone with Italy in 2015

Personal information
- Full name: Nicola Domenico Sansone
- Date of birth: 10 September 1991 (age 35)
- Place of birth: Munich, Germany
- Height: 1.73 m (5 ft 8 in)
- Position: Forward

Youth career
- –2002: SV Neuperlach
- 2002–2010: Bayern Munich

Senior career*
Years	Team	Apps	(Gls)
2010–2011	Bayern Munich II	32	(2)
2011–2014	Parma	43	(8)
2011–2012	→ Crotone (loan)	35	(5)
2014–2016	Sassuolo	84	(17)
2016–2019	Villarreal	53	(14)
2019	→ Bologna (loan)	15	(2)
2019–2023	Bologna	104	(12)
2023–2025	Lecce	30	(2)

International career^{‡}
2007	Italy U17	1	(0)
2009	Italy U18	1	(1)
2009–2010	Italy U19	6	(1)
2012	Italy U20	1	(0)
2012–2013	Italy U21	8	(0)
2015–2016	Italy	3	(0)
- * Club domestic league appearances and goals as of 30 May 2025 ‡ National team caps and goals as of 15 November 2016

Nicola Domenico Sansone (Italian pronunciation: [niˈkɔːla doˈmeːniko sanˈsoːne]; born 10 September 1991) is an Italian professional footballer who plays as a forward. Born in Germany, he has played for the Italy national team.

== Club career ==
Sansone was born in Munich in Germany and his first club was SV Neuperlach. At the age of 10, he transferred to Bayern Munich, where he progressed through the Junior Team. He made his debut for Bayern's reserve team in January 2010, in a 3. Liga match against Dynamo Dresden. He made three more appearances in the 2009–10 season, and was a regular in the team during the 2010–11 season. In October 2010, he was named on the substitutes bench for the first-team in a Bundesliga match against SC Freiburg. He was released in June 2011 after Bayern's reserves were relegated from the 3. Liga.

=== Sassuolo ===
On 21 January 2014, Sansone along with teammates Pedro Mendes and Aleandro Rosi joined Sassuolo from fellow Serie A club Parma. Sansone and Mendes both signed co-ownership deals, for €2.5 million and €500,000 respectively. Rosi however made a loan switch from Parma to Sassuolo, as part of the swap with Jonathan Rossini also in temporary deal.

In June 2014 Raman Chibsah and Sansone joined Sassuolo outright for an additional €5.75 million from Parma, as well as Parma bought back Mendes for €2.5 million.

=== Villarreal ===
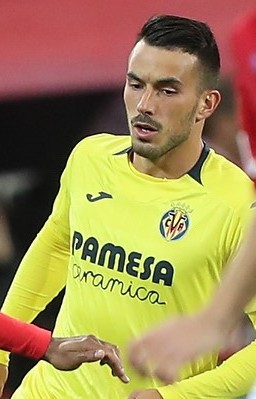
Nicola Sansone with Villareal in 2018

On 7 August 2016, Sansone signed with Villarreal on a five-year contract reported to be in the region of €13 million. He made his club debut in a 1–1 away draw against Granada in La Liga, on 20 August, and scored his first goal for the club in a 2–0 away win over Málaga in La Liga, on 10 September.

=== Bologna ===
On 4 January 2019, he joined Italian club Bologna on loan with an obligation to buy.

=== Lecce ===
On 11 September 2023, Serie A club Lecce announced the signing of Sansone.

== International career ==
Sansone made his U17 debut in November 2007 along with Bayern teammate Roberto Soriano. Both players also called up to 2008 Minsk under-17 International Tournament He scored a goal in the second match, a 3–0 win against Belarus. However, he was not called up to 2008 UEFA European Under-17 Football Championship elite round in March.

He played for the Italy U19 team on 11 March 2009, the second match of the 2009–10 season (for which only players born in or after 1991 were eligible), and he was also called up to the team's next friendly match against Ukraine (class of 1990 team), as Ukraine was preparing for the 2009 UEFA European Under-19 Football Championship finals. He scored a goal in the match, which ended in a 2–2 draw. He then dropped from the team, as he did not receive a call-up to the U18 team (class of 1991) for a friendly tournament in Slovakia. In November 2009, he was recalled to the U19 team for 2010 UEFA European Under-19 Football Championship qualification. He replaced captain Jacopo Sala in the first match, then started in the next two matches as a wing forward, partnered with forward Mattia Destro and Nicolao Dumitru against San Marino, ahead of Marco D'Alessandro, who started in the first match. In the last match against Republic of Ireland, Sansone was partnered with Destro in a 4–4–2 formation. Sansone was then selected in one of the three friendly matches before the 2010 UEFA European Under-19 Football Championship elite qualification, but never received a call-up again, as some of the players had recovered from injury and other players had returned from the U21 team (Fabio Borini and midfielder Soriano, etc.).

Sansone made his U20 debut in February 2012. He also played an unofficial friendly against the Italy under-21 Serie B representative team in December 2011.

On 31 May 2015, Sansone received his first senior Italy national team call-up from Antonio Conte.

On 16 June 2015, Sansone debuted for the Italian senior team after being substituted on for Stephan El Shaarawy in the 68th minute in a 1–0 friendly defeat to Portugal.

== Style of play ==
Sansone is a fast and agile forward with a slender physique and an eye for goal. He possesses good technique and dribbling skills, which enable him to take on opponents in one on one situations. He is capable of playing as a second striker, but his preferred position is as a left winger, a position which allows him to cut into the centre to strike on goal with his favoured right foot or make attacking runs into the area in order to create space for teammates.

== Career statistics ==
=== Club ===
As of match played 25 May 2025

Appearances and goals by club, season and competition
Club	Season	League			National cup		Continental		Total	
Club	Season	Division	Apps	Goals	Apps	Goals	Apps	Goals	Apps	Goals
Bayern Munich II	2009–10	3. Liga	4	0	—		—		4	0
Bayern Munich II	2010–11	3. Liga	28	2	—		—		28	2
Bayern Munich II	Total		32	2	—		—		32	2
Parma	2011–12	Serie A	0	0	0	0	—		0	0
Parma	2012–13	Serie A	26	6	0	0	—		26	6
Parma	2013–14	Serie A	17	2	2	0	—		19	2
Parma	Total		43	8	2	0	—		45	8
Crotone (loan)	2011–12	Serie B	35	5	1	1	—		36	6
Sassuolo	2013–14	Serie A	12	5	—		—		12	5
Sassuolo	2014–15	Serie A	35	5	2	3	—		37	8
Sassuolo	2015–16	Serie A	37	7	1	0	—		38	7
Sassuolo	2016–17	Serie A	0	0	0	0	2 (Note: Appearance(s) in UEFA Europa League)	0	2	0
Sassuolo	Total		84	17	3	3	2	0	89	20
Villarreal	2016–17	La Liga	32	8	4	0	6	1	42	9
Villarreal	2017–18	La Liga	18	5	1	0	3	1	22	6
Villarreal	2018–19	La Liga	3	1	1	0	3	0	7	1
Villarreal	Total		53	14	6	0	12	2	71	16
Bologna (loan)	2018–19	Serie A	15	2	1	0	—		16	2
Bologna	2019–20	Serie A	33	4	1	0	—		34	4
Bologna	2020–21	Serie A	26	2	2	0	—		28	2
Bologna	2021–22	Serie A	27	2	0	0	—		27	2
Bologna	2022–23	Serie A	18	4	2	1	—		20	5
Bologna	Total		119	14	6	1	—		125	15
Lecce	2023–24	Serie A	25	2	1	0	—		26	2
Lecce	2024–25	Serie A	5	0	0	0	—		5	0
Lecce	Total		30	2	1	0	—		31	2
Career total			396	62	19	5	14	2	429	69

=== International ===
As of match played on 15 November 2016

Appearances and goals by national team and year
National team	Year	Apps	Goals
Italy	2015	1	0
Italy	2016	2	0
Total		3	0
