= Raman Chibsah =

Ghanaian footballer (born 1993)

Personal information
- Full name: Yussif Raman Chibsah
- Date of birth: 10 March 1993 (age 33)
- Place of birth: Accra, Ghana
- Height: 1.78 m (5 ft 10 in)
- Position: Midfielder

Youth career
- –2009: Bechem United
- 2009–2011: Sassuolo
- 2011–2012: Juventus

Senior career*
Years	Team	Apps	(Gls)
2012–2013	Parma	0	(0)
2012–2013	→ Sassuolo (loan)	28	(2)
2013–2017	Sassuolo	26	(0)
2015–2016	→ Frosinone (loan)	22	(0)
2016–2017	→ Benevento (loan)	36	(5)
2017–2018	Benevento	14	(0)
2018	→ Frosinone (loan)	16	(1)
2018–2019	Frosinone	32	(1)
2019–2020	Gaziantep	24	(1)
2020–2022	VfL Bochum	10	(1)
2022	Apollon Smyrnis	13	(0)
2022–2023	Ionikos	9	(0)
2023–2024	Caratese	13	(1)
2024–2025	Ceahlăul Piatra Neamț	18	(0)
2025–2026	CSM Slatina	18	(0)

International career
2013	Ghana U20	1	(0)
2015	Ghana U23	1	(0)
2013	Ghana	2	(0)
- * Club domestic league appearances and goals as of 9 May 2026

Yussif Raman Chibsah (born 10 March 1993) is a Ghanaian professional footballer who plays as a midfielder. He represented the Ghana national team.

== Club career ==
On 17 August 2012, Chibsah moved from Juventus to Parma in a co-ownership deal (swap with Francesco Anacoura) before being immediately loaned to Sassuolo, where he was under contract prior to his move to Juventus in 2011 (having joined from Bechem United in March 2009). Both 50% registration rights of Anacoura and Chibsah were tagged for €750,000. Chibsah also received a call-up to Parma's pre-season camp on 14 July 2012.

On 1 September 2012, he made his professional debut for Sassuolo against Crotone as a substitute in a 2–1 victory in Serie B.

On 19 June 2013, Parma acquired the playing rights for Chibsah outright for €1 million and renewed the co-ownership of Anacoura. Sassuolo later acquired half of the registration rights of Chibsah from Parma for €2.5 million.

In June 2014 Sassuolo acquired playing rights for Chibsah and Nicola Sansone outright for an additional €5.75 million, and Pedro Filipe Mendes was bought back for €2.5 million.

On 6 July 2015, Chibsah joined newly promoted Serie A side Frosinone in a season-long loan move.

On 15 July 2016, he was signed by Serie B side Benevento on loan, winning the promotion playoffs to Serie A. Benevento also acquired Chibsah outright at the end of season. However, on 15 January 2018, Chibsah returned to Frosinone on loan. On 19 June, Chibsah joined Frosinone outright.

On 8 August 2019, Chibsah joined Turkish Süper Lig club Gazişehir Gaziantep. On 9 September 2020, Gazisehir Gaziantep announced they had parted ways with Chibsah following a mutual contract termination.

On 18 September 2020, he became a new VfL Bochum player.

On 2 February 2022, Chibsah signed with Apollon Smyrnis in Greece.

== International career ==
Chibsah was born and raised in Ghana. He debuted for the Ghana U20s in 2013, for the senior team in a friendly 2–2 tie against Turkey in 2013, and for the Ghana U23 in a 1–0 loss to the Mozambique U23s.

== Career statistics ==
=== Club ===
As of match played 9 May 2026

Appearances and goals by club, season and competition
Club	Season	League			National cup (Note: Includes Coppa Italia, Turkish Cup, Turkish Cup, DFB-Pokal, Greek Cup, Cupa României)		Europe		Other		Total	
Club	Season	Division	Apps	Goals	Apps	Goals	Apps	Goals	Apps	Goals	Apps	Goals
Sassuolo (loan)	2012–13	Serie B	28	2	—		—		—		28	2
Sassuolo	2013–14	Serie A	18	0	1	0	—		—		19	0
Sassuolo	2014–15	Serie A	8	0	3	0	—		—		11	0
Sassuolo	Total		54	2	4	0	—		—		58	2
Frosinone (loan)	2015–16	Serie A	22	0	1	0	—		—		23	0
Benevento (loan)	2016–17	Serie B	36	5	1	0	—		5 (Note: Appearances in Serie B promotion play-offs)	1	42	6
Benevento	2017–18	Serie A	14	0	0	0	—		—		14	0
Benevento	Total		50	5	1	0	—		5	1	56	6
Frosinone (loan)	2017–18	Serie B	16	1	—		—		3	0	19	1
Frosinone	2018–19	Serie A	32	1	1	0	—		—		33	1
Frosinone	Total		48	2	1	0	—		3	0	52	2
Gaziantep	2019–20	Süper Lig	24	1	4	1	—		—		28	2
VfL Bochum	2020–21	2. Bundesliga	10	1	1	0	—		—		11	1
VfL Bochum	2021–22	Bundesliga	0	0	0	0	—		—		0	0
VfL Bochum	Total		10	1	1	0	—		—		11	1
Apollon Smyrnis	2021–22	Super League Greece	13	0	—		—		—		13	0
Ionikos	2022–23	Super League Greece	9	0	1	0	—		—		10	0
Folgore Caratese	2023–24	Serie D	13	1	—		—		—		13	1
Ceahlăul Piatra Neamț	2024–25	Liga II	18	0	2	0	—		—		20	0
CSM Slatina	2025–26	Liga II	18	0	3	0	—		—		21	0
Career total			279	12	18	1	0	0	8	1	305	14

=== International ===
As of match played 10 September 2013

Appearances and goals by national team and year
National team	Year	Apps	Goals
Ghana	2013	2	0
Total		2	0

== Honours ==
Sassuolo

- Serie B: 2012–13

VfL Bochum

- 2. Bundesliga: 2020–21
