= Adriano Russo =

Italian footballer (born 1987)

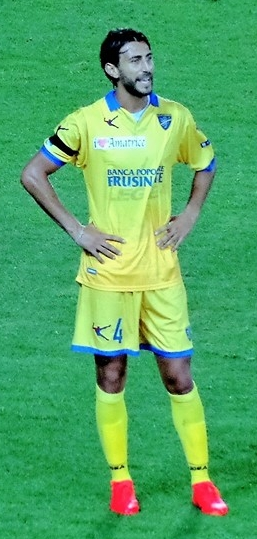
- Adriano Russo, Frosinone football player

Personal information
- Date of birth: 6 June 1987 (age 39)
- Place of birth: Naples, Italy
- Height: 1.86 m (6 ft 1 in)
- Position: Defender

Senior career*
Years	Team	Apps	(Gls)
2006–2007	Siena	0	(0)
2007–2008	Massese	15	(0)
2008–2010	Colligiana	22	(0)
2010	Vico Equense	12	(0)
2010–2011	Todi	21	(2)
2011–2013	Perugia	46	(2)
2013–2018	Frosinone	78	(2)
2019	Voluntari	6	(0)
- * Club domestic league appearances and goals as of 1 June 2019

Adriano Russo (born 6 June 1987) is an Italian former footballer who played as a defender.

== Career ==
He scored his first Serie A goal for Frosinone on 17 April 2016 in a 2–1 defeat of Hellas Verona.
