= Selim Ben Djemia =

Tunisian footballer (born 1989)

Personal information
- Date of birth: 29 January 1989 (age 37)
- Place of birth: Thiais, France
- Height: 1.86 m (6 ft 1 in)
- Position: Defender

Youth career
- 2007–2008: Genoa

Senior career*
Years	Team	Apps	(Gls)
2008–2013	Genoa	0	(0)
2009–2010	→ Padova (loan)	5	(0)
2010–2011	→ Frosinone (loan)	18	(0)
2011	→ Red Star (loan)	4	(0)
2012	→ Petrolul Ploiești (loan)	12	(0)
2012–2013	→ Astra Giurgiu (loan)	5	(0)
2013–2015	Laval	32	(0)
2013–2015	Laval B	15	(0)
2015–2016	Sfaxien	18	(1)
2017	Vereya	28	(1)
2018	Lamia	5	(0)
2019	Dunărea Călărași	9	(0)
2020–2021	Don Benito	13	(0)
Total		164	(2)

International career
2014–2015	Tunisia	5	(0)
- * Club domestic league appearances and goals

Selim Ben Djemia (born 29 January 1989) is a former professional footballer who played as a defender. Born in France, he represented Tunisia at international level.

== Club career ==
In 2007, Ben Djemia joined Italian side Genoa at the age of 18. On 23 June 2010, Serie B club Padova decided not to buy him outright; on the next day, he went to Frosinone on loan with option to co-own the player as part of Robert Gucher's deal.

On 8 February 2017, Ben Djemia signed with Bulgarian club Vereya.

On 10 February 2018, in the last day before the end of the transfer window for unattached players, Ben Djemia signed with Super League Greece club Lamia, on a six-month deal.

He joined Romanian club Dunărea Călărași in January 2019.

== International career ==
Ben Djemia was named in Tunisia's international squad for their friendly match against South Korea on 28 May 2014, in which he made his debut in their 1–0 win.
