= Massimiliano Carlini =

Italian footballer (born 1986)

Personal information
- Date of birth: 20 August 1986 (age 40)
- Place of birth: Terracina, Italy
- Height: 1.75 m (5 ft 9 in)
- Position: Winger

Team information
- Current team: Terracina

Senior career*
Years	Team	Apps	(Gls)
2004–2005	Isola Liri	31	(7)
2005–2010	Frosinone	24	(0)
2006–2007	→ Sambenedettese (loan)	29	(7)
2008–2009	→ Lecco (loan)	28	(9)
2010–2012	Sorrento	75	(14)
2012–2013	Cremonese	42	(11)
2014–2016	Frosinone	51	(4)
2016–2017	Casertana	19	(5)
2017–2018	Reggiana	57	(4)
2018–2020	Juve Stabia	44	(10)
2020–2022	Catanzaro	73	(14)
2022–2023	Monterosi	29	(5)
2023–	Terracina	0	(0)
- * Club domestic league appearances and goals as of 23 April 2023

Massimiliano Carlini (born 20 August 1986) is an Italian footballer who plays as a winger for Eccellenza Lazio club Terracina.

== Career ==
On 28 July 2018, he signed a two-year contract with the Serie C club Juve Stabia.

On 28 January 2020, Carlini joined Catanzaro on a 1.5-year contract.
