= Leonardo Blanchard =

Italian footballer

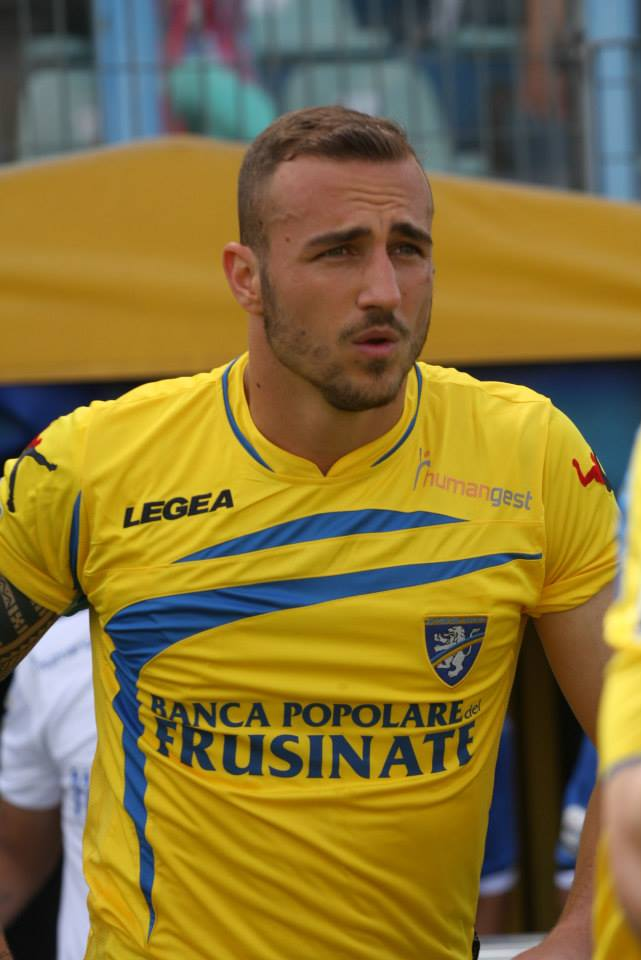
- Leonardo Blanchard in 2014.

Personal information
- Date of birth: 6 May 1988 (age 38)
- Place of birth: Grosseto, Italy
- Height: 1.87 m (6 ft 2 in)
- Position: Centre-back

Youth career
- –2006: Sauro Rispescia
- 2005–2006: → Siena (loan)

Senior career*
Years	Team	Apps	(Gls)
2006–2012	Siena	0	(0)
2006–2007	→ Poggibonsi (loan)	3	(0)
2007	→ Sangimignano (loan)	15	(1)
2008–2010	→ VdG (loan)	44	(0)
2010	→ Pergo (loan)	11	(1)
2010–2011	→ Pavia (loan)	24	(2)
2011–2012	→ FeralpiSalò (loan)	23	(1)
2012–2016	Frosinone	113	(9)
2016–2018	Carpi	7	(0)
2017	→ Brescia (loan)	17	(2)
2018	→ Alessandria (loan)	6	(0)
- * Club domestic league appearances and goals as of 23 May 2018

Leonardo Blanchard (born 6 May 1988) is an Italian footballer who plays as a centre-back.

== Club career ==
Born in Grosseto, Tuscany, Blanchard started his career at his hometown club Sauro Rispescia, located in Rispescia frazione.

=== Siena ===
On 30 August 2005 he was signed by Serie A team Siena, which is also a Tuscan team. He played for its Berretti team (B team of under-20 age group or U-18 team). In the next season he left for Poggibonsi, but in January 2007 left for Serie D team Sangimignano; the team was relegated to Eccellenza Tuscany at the end of season. Blanchard was promoted to the Primavera under-20 team of Siena in 2007–08 season.

In 2008, he left for Valle del Giovenco, his first team outside Tuscany, where he spent 1 1/2 seasons. At the end of the 2010 winter (January) transfer window, he left for Pergocrema, with Fabrizio Di Bella moving in the opposite direction on a temporary deal. He played both legs of the relegation "play-out".

In July 2010 he left for Pavia. He was a call-up to Siena's pre-season camp in 2011. He played a few friendlies before he left the club on 20 July.

=== Frosinone ===
On 9 August 2012 he left for Frosinone. On 19 June 2013 Frosinone bought Blanchard's registration rights definitively for a peppercorn fee of €1,000.

On 23 September 2015, Blanchard made Frosinone club history by scoring the equalizing goal in the closing minute of stoppage time in a 1–1 draw against Serie A giants, Juventus. This was Frosinone's first historical Serie A point. Blanchard also revealed it was "an emotional moment" especially since he declared to have been a Juventus fan for a long time.

=== Carpi ===
In mid-2016 he was signed by Carpi. He joined the pre-season camp circa 22 July. He was assigned No.23 shirt. On 30 January 2017 Blanchard left for Brescia on loan.

Blanchard returned to Carpi in mid-2017. However, he was left out from the squad for 2017–18 Serie B season.

On 31 January 2018 Blanchard left for Alessandria. Blanchard was released by Carpi in July 2018 in a mutual consent.
