= Daniel Ciofani =

Italian footballer (born 1985)

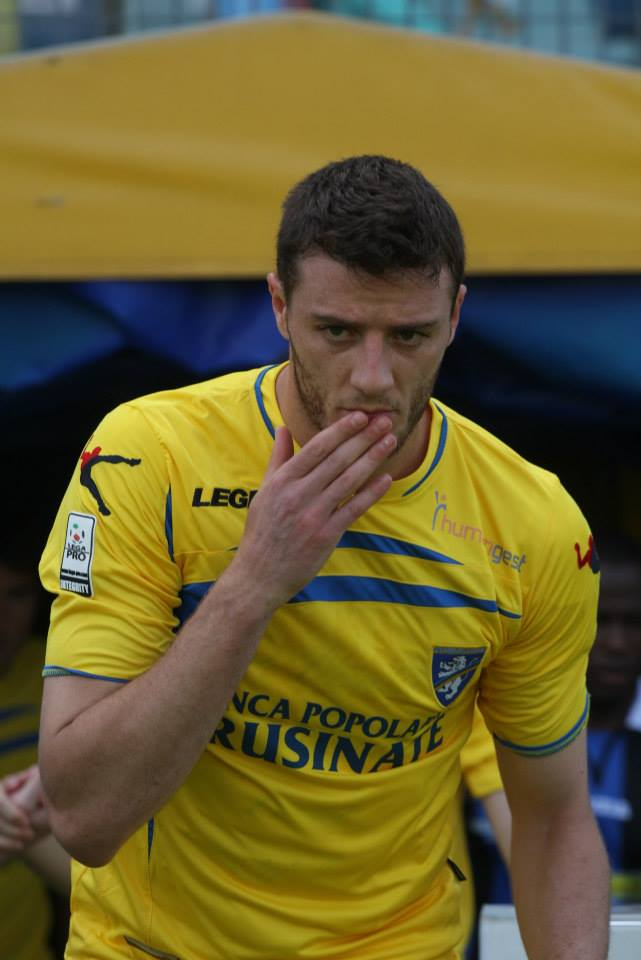
- Ciofani with Frosinone in 2014

Personal information
- Full name: Daniel Ciofani
- Date of birth: 31 July 1985 (age 41)
- Place of birth: Avezzano, Italy
- Height: 1.91 m (6 ft 3 in)
- Position: Forward

Youth career
- Pescara

Senior career*
Years	Team	Apps	(Gls)
2005–2008	Pescara	12	(1)
2006–2007	→ Celano (loan)	29	(7)
2008	→ Gela (loan)	15	(7)
2008–2011	Cisco/Atletico Roma	98	(54)
2011–2013	Parma	0	(0)
2011–2012	→ Gubbio (loan)	37	(8)
2012–2013	→ Perugia (loan)	28	(12)
2013–2019	Frosinone	211	(71)
2019–2024	Cremonese	153	(33)
Total		583	(193)
- * Club domestic league appearances and goals

Daniel Ciofani (born 31 July 1985) is an Italian former professional footballer who played as a forward.

== Career ==
=== Pescara ===
Born in Avezzano, Abruzzo, Ciofani started his career at Serie B side Pescara. In August 2006, he was loaned to Serie C1 side Celano along with Alessio Spoltore. He made 29 league appearances for Celano and returned to Pescara on 1 July 2007. As Pescara were recently relegated to Serie C1 in June 2007, he only made two appearances. On 4 January 2008, he was loaned to Gela of Serie C2. He scored seven goals in a half season.

=== Atletico Roma ===
Ciofani was loaned to Seconda Divisione (ex- Serie C2) side Cisco Roma in August 2008 (renamed to Atletico Roma in 2010) with option to buy half of the registration rights in June 2009, for €130,000. He scored 37 goals in two seasons and won the promotion playoffs with Cisco Roma in 2010. He was the team top-scorer of Cisco Roma and top-scorer of the 2nd Divisione Group C in 2009–10 season. Which he was the joint-topscorer of the league along with Alessandro Marotta of Group B. He scored two more goals in the playoffs, just one goal short behind Alessandro Cesarini and Giacomo Casoli (both three goals) and shared the play-offs second highest scorer with Alessandro Cesca, Francesco Corapi, Antonio Montella and Antonio Gaeta; thus he was the overall top-scorer of the 2nd Divisione.

In June 2010, Pescara also won promotion (but to Serie B) and both clubs failed to agree the price of the remained 50% registration rights, thus both clubs had to submit a bid in envelope to Lega Pro to decide the ownership. On 30 June 2010, Lega Pro announced that Cisco Roma won the closed tender as the highest bidder for an additional €222,000.

=== Parma ===
On 8 July 2010, Ciofani signed for Serie A side Parma F.C. in another co-ownership deal, for €300,000 in four-year contract. As part of the deal, Atletico Roma signed Alessio Tombesi (for €50,000) and Abel Gigli (for a peppercorn fee) in co-ownership deal, Abdou Doumbia and Gianluca Lapadula on loan. Ciofani also remained in Rome on loan for another season. He scored 16 goals in 2010–11 season as team-topscorer. On 24 June 2011, Parma bought the remain 50% registration rights for €100,000 and bought back Gigli.

In July 2011, he was loaned to Serie B newcomer Gubbio, which Parma also bore part of the wage for €185,000 as premi di valorizzazione. On 2 August 2012, he signed for A.C. Perugia Calcio. In summer 2012 he added one more year to his contract with Parma (to 2015), making Parma still eligible for a co-ownership contract with any club until 2013.

=== Frosinone ===
On 30 June 2013, Ciofani signed for Frosinone Calcio in co-ownership deal, swapped with Leandro Campagna. Both 50% registration rights of the players were tagged for €600,000. On 24 January 2014, Frosinone signed Ciofani outright. He scored his first goal in Serie A for the club on 28 October 2015 in a 2–1 win over Carpi.

=== Cremonese ===
On 9 August 2019, Ciofani signed a multi-year contract with Cremonese. On 28 February 2023, he scored a penalty in a 2–1 win over Roma, which was his club's first win in the 2022–23 Serie A season after 24 matches, and also the first since the 1995–96 season.

== Personal life ==
His brother, Matteo is also a professional footballer, and they played together as teammates for Frosinone between 2013 and 2018.
