= Robert Gucher =

Austrian footballer (born 1991)

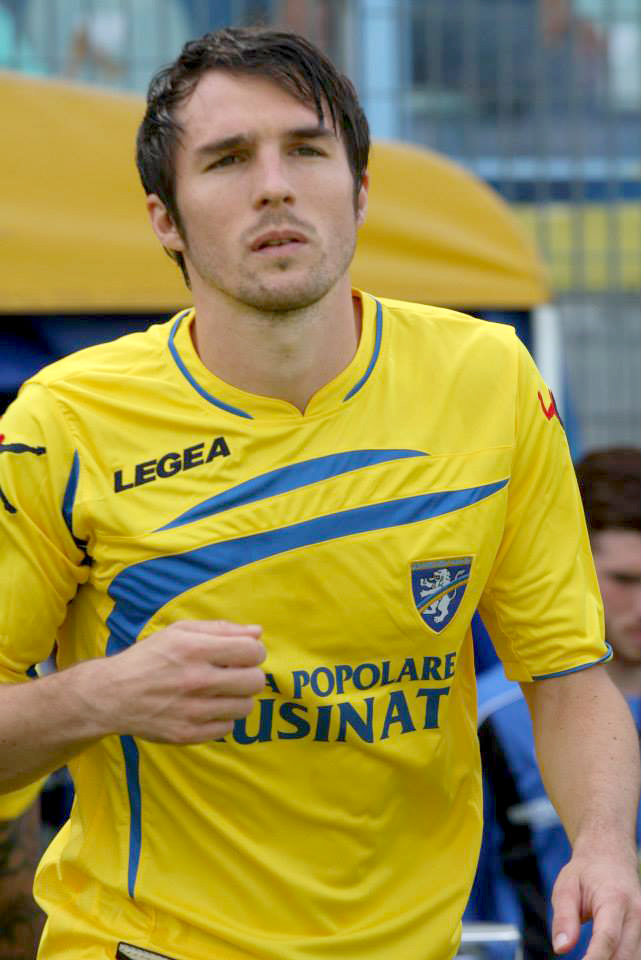

Personal information
- Full name: Robert Franz Gucher
- Date of birth: 20 February 1991 (age 35)
- Place of birth: Graz, Austria
- Height: 1.83 m (6 ft 0 in)
- Position: Defensive midfielder

Team information
- Current team: Treviso
- Number: 27

Youth career
- Grazer AK
- 2008–2010: Frosinone

Senior career*
Years	Team	Apps	(Gls)
2009–2017	Frosinone	129	(7)
2010	→ Genoa (loan)	0	(0)
2011–2012	→ SV Kapfenberg (loan)	21	(1)
2017	Vicenza	18	(0)
2017–2023	Pisa	163	(11)
2023	Pordenone	11	(0)
2023–2025	Lucchese	55	(4)
2025–	Treviso	31	(3)

International career^{‡}
2006–2008	Austria U17	9	(1)
2008–2010	Austria U19	14	(2)
2011	Austria U20	3	(0)
- * Club domestic league appearances and goals as of 30 June 2026 ‡ National team caps and goals as of 14:21, 18 December 2022 (UTC)

Robert Franz Gucher (born 20 February 1991) is an Austrian professional footballer who plays as a midfielder for Serie C Group A club Treviso.

== Club career ==
Born in Graz, Gucher started his career at hometown club Grazer AK. In July 2008, aged 17, he joined Frosinone of Serie B along with Dieter Elsneg after his club was expelled from professional football.

He played his league debut on 21 April 2009 as starter against Modena, he was replaced by Nunzio Di Roberto in the 60th minutes. In the next season he played eight starts and two substitutes appearances in Serie B.

On 1 February 2010, he was loaned to Genoa for €200,000, while Elsneg joined Genoa's city rival Sampdoria earlier in January. He played at their Primavera Under-20 Team.

On 24 June 2010, Genoa signed him in a co-ownership deal, for €1.3 million, co-currently, Frosinone signed the remain 50% rights of Salvatore Aurelio (for €800,000) and Diogo Tavares (for €600,000), and the loan of Selim Ben Djemia (for €100,000) But Gucher spent the first half of the 2010–11 season at Frosinone, and was loaned to Austrian Bundesliga side Kapfenberger SV for 1.5 years on 31 January 2011.

In June 2012, Gucher returned to Frosinone.

On 31 January 2023, Gucher signed a two-and-a-half-year contract with Pordenone in Serie C.

On 21 July 2023, Gucher moved to Lucchese on a two-year deal.

== International career ==
Gucher represented Austria at under-17 level before going on to play for the under-19 side at 2010 UEFA European Under-19 Championship and the under-20 side at the 2011 FIFA U-20 World Cup.

Gucher got his first call up to the senior Austria squad for a friendly against Switzerland in November 2015.
