= Federico Dionisi =

Italian footballer (born 1987)

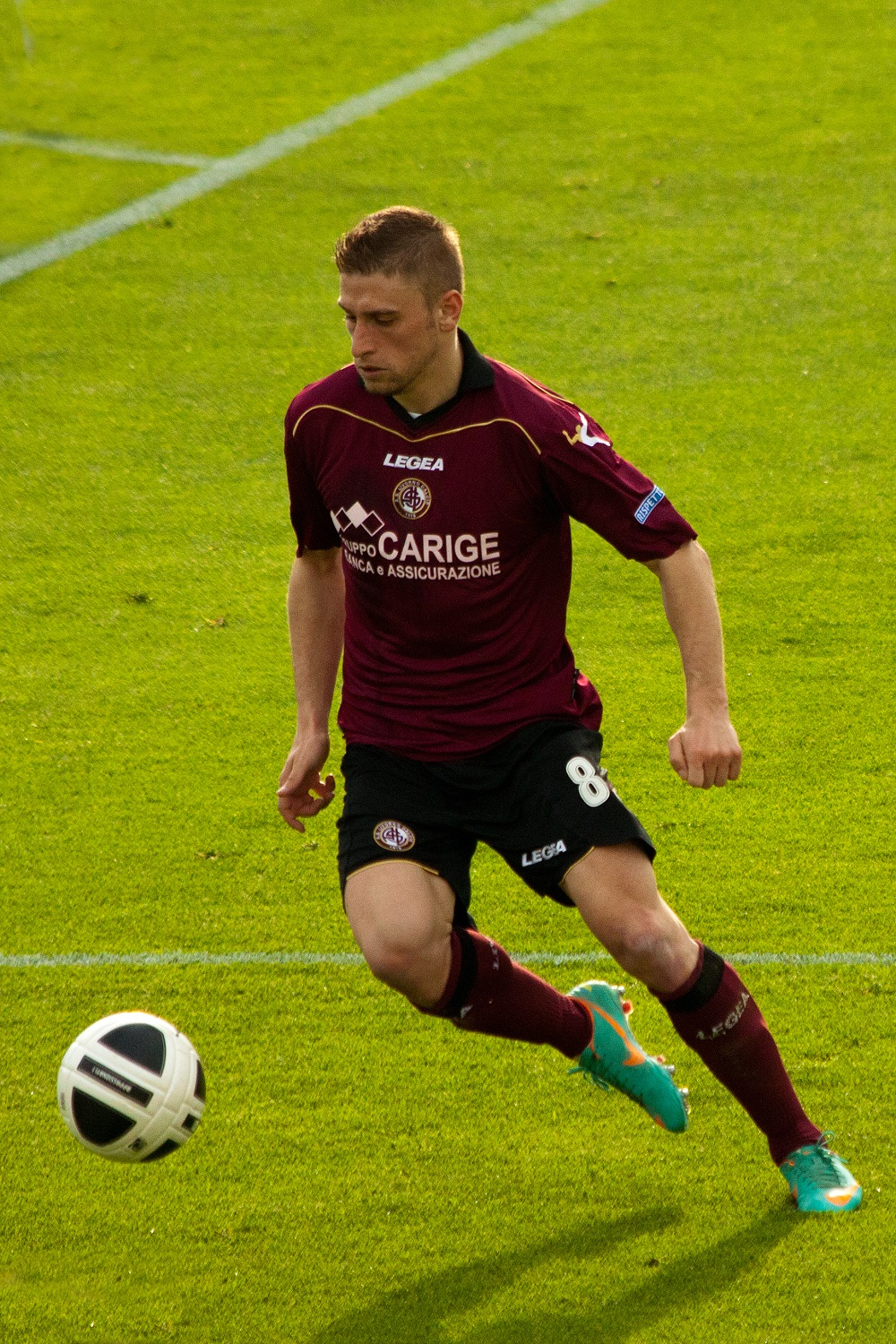

Personal information
- Date of birth: 16 June 1987 (age 39)
- Place of birth: Rieti, Italy
- Height: 1.80 m (5 ft 11 in)
- Position: Striker

Team information
- Current team: Lucchese
- Number: 9

Youth career
- –2003: Monterotondo

Senior career*
Years	Team	Apps	(Gls)
2003–2006	Monterotondo	42	(17)
2006–2007	Cisco Roma	10	(0)
2007–2009	Celano	74	(28)
2009–2014	Livorno	111	(36)
2010	→ Salernitana (loan)	18	(10)
2013–2014	→ Olhanense (loan)	24	(8)
2014–2021	Frosinone	192	(62)
2021–2023	Ascoli	82	(20)
2023–2024	Ternana	22	(1)
2024–2026	Livorno	65	(23)
2026–	Lucchese	0	(0)
- * Club domestic league appearances and goals as of 30 April 2026

Federico Dionisi (born 16 June 1987) is an Italian professional footballer who plays as a striker for Serie D club Lucchese.

== Career ==
Dionisi started his career at non-professional team Monterotondo. He also spent 1 season at Messina's youth team. A native of Lazio, he moved to Rome which is both the capital of Lazio and Italy, for Cisco Roma of Serie C2. In January 2007, he moved to Abruzzo for Celano. He played 15 league matches in his first professional season, including one in playoffs.

=== Livorno ===
On 2 January 2009, Dionisi agreed to join Livorno after some good performances with Celano and Monterotondo. He was presented by Livorno on 2 July with other news players of Livorno, Francesco Di Bella and Cristian Raimondi. He scored his first official goal with Livorno on 14 August against Torino in Coppa Italia. Livorno won the match for 2–0.

In September 2013, he signed a one-year loan deal with Olhanense.

=== Frosinone ===
On 28 July 2014, Dionisi signed permanently with Frosinone. He helped Frosinone gain promotion to Serie A for the 2015–16 season. He scored his first Serie A goal on 28 September 2015 in the 58th minute and then scored a second in the 71st minute in a 2–0 home win against Empoli.

=== Ascoli ===
On 24 January 2021, Dionisi signed a 2.5-year contract for Serie B team Ascoli.

=== Ternana ===
On 29 August 2023, Dionisi joined Ternana on a one-year deal with an optional second year.
