= 2015–16 Serie A =

114th season of top-tier Italian football

Serie A
- Season: 2015–16
- Dates: 22 August 2015 – 15 May 2016
- Champions: Juventus; 32nd title
- Relegated: Carpi; Frosinone; Hellas Verona
- Champions League: Juventus; Napoli; Roma
- Europa League: Internazionale; Fiorentina; Sassuolo
- Matches: 380
- Goals: 979 (2.58 per match)
- Top goalscorer: Gonzalo Higuaín (36 goals)
- Best goalkeeper: Gianluigi Buffon (21 clean sheets)
- Biggest home win: Napoli 6–0 Bologna (19 April 2016)
- Biggest away win: Goal difference of 4; 6 games
- Highest scoring: Sampdoria 5–2 Carpi (23 August 2015); Lazio 5–2 Hellas Verona (11 February 2016)
- Longest winning run: 15 games Juventus
- Longest unbeaten run: 26 games Juventus
- Longest winless run: 22 games Hellas Verona
- Longest losing run: 5 games Genoa
- Highest attendance: 79,154; Internazionale 1–0 Milan (13 September 2015); Internazionale 0–0 Juventus (18 October 2015)
- Lowest attendance: 0 (behind closed doors); Palermo 2–2 Atalanta (20 April 2016)
- Average attendance: 22,199

The 2015–16 Serie A (known as the Serie A TIM for sponsorship reasons) was the 114th season of top-tier Italian football, the 84th in a round-robin tournament, and the 6th since its organization under a league committee separate from Serie B. Juventus were the defending champions. The campaign began on 22 August 2015 and ended on 15 May 2016.

On 25 April 2016, Juventus succeeded in defending their title for the fifth consecutive season, after second placed Napoli lost to Roma, giving Juventus a 12-point lead with only three games left.

== Events ==
On 28 April 2015 Carpi obtained its first promotion ever to Serie A, after debuting in Serie B the year before, becoming the 64th team to participate in Serie A since the 1929–30 season. On 16 May, Frosinone also earned its first promotion to Serie A, becoming the 65th to participate. On 9 June 2015 Bologna won Serie B play-off, returning to the Serie A after just one year.

This season of Serie A was the first season to have goal-line technology implemented after severe complaints from various teams' general managers (first Adriano Galliani) in relation to controversial ghost goals during recent seasons of Serie A.

On 20 March 2016, Gianluigi Buffon broke the previous record of Sebastiano Rossi (929 minutes) by setting a longer period of 974 minutes without conceding a goal.

On 14 May, Gonzalo Higuaín broke Gunnar Nordahl's record for most goals scored in Serie A (20 teams championship) in a season (35 in 1949–50) and equaled Gino Rossetti's record in 1928–29 (that was composed of 32 teams, instead) by scoring 36 goals and winning the Capocannoniere.

Three Serie A icons also retired at the end of the season; the Verona captain Luca Toni, who scored 157 goals in 324 league appearances and was twice the league's top scorer, as well as Gianpaolo Bellini, the left-back who spent his entire career with Atalanta, making 435 appearances with the club. Both players also scored in their final games with their clubs on 8 May 2016, Toni in a 2–1 win over champions Juventus and Bellini in a 1–1 draw with Udinese; and on 14 May, Christian Abbiati for Milan in the last fixture of the season at home against Roma, however, he did not get any playing time, totaling 281 league appearances for the club.

== Teams ==
=== Stadiums and locations ===
Locations of the 2015–16 Serie A teams

Team	Home city	Stadium	Capacity	2014–15 season
Atalanta	Bergamo	Stadio Atleti Azzurri d'Italia	26,542	17th in Serie A
Bologna	Bologna	Stadio Renato Dall'Ara	38,279	Serie B playoffs winner
Carpi	Carpi	Stadio Alberto Braglia (Modena)	21,151	Serie B Champions
Chievo	Verona	Stadio Marc'Antonio Bentegodi	38,402	14th in Serie A
Empoli	Empoli	Stadio Carlo Castellani	16,800	15th in Serie A
Fiorentina	Florence	Stadio Artemio Franchi	47,282	4th in Serie A
Frosinone	Frosinone	Stadio Matusa	10,000	2nd in Serie B
Genoa	Genoa	Stadio Luigi Ferraris	36,685	6th in Serie A
Hellas Verona	Verona	Stadio Marc'Antonio Bentegodi	38,402	13th in Serie A
Internazionale	Milan	San Siro	80,018	8th in Serie A
Juventus	Turin	Juventus Stadium	41,475	Serie A Champions
Lazio	Rome	Stadio Olimpico	72,698	3rd in Serie A
Milan	Milan	San Siro	80,018	10th in Serie A
Napoli	Naples	Stadio San Paolo	60,240	5th in Serie A
Palermo	Palermo	Stadio Renzo Barbera	36,349	11th in Serie A
Roma	Rome	Stadio Olimpico	72,698	2nd in Serie A
Sampdoria	Genoa	Stadio Luigi Ferraris	36,685	7th in Serie A
Sassuolo	Sassuolo	Mapei Stadium – Città del Tricolore (Reggio Emilia)	23,717	12th in Serie A
Torino	Turin	Stadio Olimpico Grande Torino	27,994	9th in Serie A
Udinese	Udine	Dacia Arena	25,144	16th in Serie A

=== Personnel and kits ===
Team	Head coach	Captain	Kit manufacturer	Shirt sponsor(s)	
Team	Head coach	Captain	Kit manufacturer	Main	Other
Atalanta	(Italy) Edoardo Reja	(Italy) Gianpaolo Bellini	Nike	SuisseGas	Front: Stone City; Back: Elettrocanali
Bologna	(Italy) Roberto Donadoni	(Italy) Archimede Morleo	Macron	FAAC	Back: Illumia
Carpi	(Italy) Fabrizio Castori	(Italy) Filippo Porcari	Givova	Azimut Holding	Back: Gaudì Jeans
Chievo	(Italy) Rolando Maran	(Italy) Sergio Pellissier	Givova	Paluani/Payexe/Nobis Assicurazioni/Italgreen/Cubi e Perina/Pescherie Viviani/Buccia di Mela/IM.COS/Midac Batteries/Salumi Negri/Alufer/I. Bis Trading/Ecoprogram/CF Costruzioni/Salumi Coati/Centro Atlante Verona/Contri Spumanti/SimetBus	Front: Payexe/Paluani; Back: Nobis Assicurazioni/Paluani/Authoitalia/Filo diretto Assicurazioni
Empoli	(Italy) Marco Giampaolo	(Italy) Massimo Maccarone	Joma	Gensan	Front: Computer Gross; Back: NGM Mobile
Fiorentina	(Portugal) Paulo Sousa	(Argentina) Gonzalo Rodríguez	Le Coq Sportif	Save the Children	Back: Save the Children (in UEFA matches)
Frosinone	(Italy) Roberto Stellone	(Italy) Alessandro Frara	Legea	Banca Popolare del Frusinate	Front: Gruppo GALA; Back: 7Sette Carburanti
Genoa	(Italy) Gian Piero Gasperini	(Argentina) Nicolás Burdisso	Lotto	AT.P.CO	Back: LeasePlan
Hellas Verona	(Italy) Luigi Delneri	(Italy) Luca Toni	Nike	Metano Nord	Front: Leaderform/SEC Events; Back: Manila Grace/Jetcoin
Internazionale	(Italy) Roberto Mancini	(Argentina) Mauro Icardi	Nike	Pirelli (H)/Driver (A)	None
Juventus	(Italy) Massimiliano Allegri	(Italy) Gianluigi Buffon	Adidas	Jeep	None
Lazio	(Italy) Simone Inzaghi	(Argentina) Lucas Biglia	Macron	Clinica Paideia	None
Milan	(Italy) Cristian Brocchi	(Italy) Riccardo Montolivo	Adidas	Fly Emirates	None
Napoli	(Italy) Maurizio Sarri	(Slovakia) Marek Hamšík	Kappa	Lete	Front: Pasta Garofalo
Palermo	(Italy) Davide Ballardini	(Italy) Stefano Sorrentino	Joma	None	None
Roma	(Italy) Luciano Spalletti	(Italy) Francesco Totti	Nike	Football Cares/Telethon	None
Sampdoria	(Italy) Vincenzo Montella	(Italy) Angelo Palombo	Joma	Parà Tempotest/Samsung Galaxy/Samsung Galaxy S7/UNICEF	Back: SsangYong Tivoli/SsangYong XLV
Sassuolo	(Italy) Eusebio Di Francesco	(Italy) Francesco Magnanelli	Kappa	Mapei	None
Torino	(Italy) Giampiero Ventura	(Poland) Kamil Glik	Kappa	Suzuki Vitara	Front: Fratelli Beretta; Back: Tecnoalarm
Udinese	(Italy) Luigi De Canio	(Italy) Antonio Di Natale	HS Football	Dacia	Back: Udinese TV (H)

- Additionally, referee kits are now being made by Diadora, and Nike has a new match ball, the Ordem Serie A.

=== Managerial changes ===
Team	Outgoing manager	Manner of departure	Date of vacancy	Position in table	Replaced by	Date of appointment
Napoli	(Spain) Rafael Benítez	Signed by Real Madrid	25 May 2015	Pre-season	(Italy) Maurizio Sarri	12 June 2015
Udinese	(Italy) Andrea Stramaccioni	Resigned	1 June 2015	Pre-season	(Italy) Stefano Colantuono	4 June 2015
Sampdoria	(Serbia) Siniša Mihajlović	Signed by Milan	1 June 2015	Pre-season	(Italy) Walter Zenga	4 June 2015
Milan	(Italy) Filippo Inzaghi	Sacked	4 June 2015	Pre-season	(Serbia) Siniša Mihajlović	16 June 2015
Empoli	(Italy) Maurizio Sarri	Signed by Napoli	5 June 2015	Pre-season	(Italy) Marco Giampaolo	9 June 2015
Fiorentina	(Italy) Vincenzo Montella	Sacked	8 June 2015	Pre-season	(Portugal) Paulo Sousa	21 June 2015
Carpi	(Italy) Fabrizio Castori	Sacked	28 September 2015	20th	(Italy) Giuseppe Sannino	29 September 2015
Bologna	(Italy) Delio Rossi	Sacked	28 October 2015	18th	(Italy) Roberto Donadoni	28 October 2015
Carpi	(Italy) Giuseppe Sannino	Sacked	3 November 2015	20th	(Italy) Fabrizio Castori	3 November 2015
Palermo	(Italy) Giuseppe Iachini	Sacked	10 November 2015	12th	(Italy) Davide Ballardini	10 November 2015
Sampdoria	(Italy) Walter Zenga	Sacked	10 November 2015	10th	(Italy) Vincenzo Montella	15 November 2015
Hellas Verona	(Italy) Andrea Mandorlini	Sacked	30 November 2015	20th	(Italy) Luigi Delneri	1 December 2015
Palermo	(Italy) Davide Ballardini	Sacked	11 January 2016	16th	(Italy) Fabio Viviani (caretaker)	11 January 2016
Roma	(France) Rudi Garcia	Sacked	13 January 2016	5th	(Italy) Luciano Spalletti	13 January 2016
Palermo	(Italy) Fabio Viviani (caretaker)	End of caretaker spell	18 January 2016	14th	(Italy) Giovanni Tedesco	26 January 2016
Palermo	(Italy) Giovanni Tedesco	End of interim spell	10 February 2016	14th	(Italy) Giovanni Bosi	10 February 2016
Palermo	(Italy) Giovanni Bosi	Sacked	15 February 2016	15th	(Italy) Giuseppe Iachini	15 February 2016
Palermo	(Italy) Giuseppe Iachini	Sacked	10 March 2016	17th	(Italy) Walter Novellino	10 March 2016
Udinese	(Italy) Stefano Colantuono	Sacked	14 March 2016	16th	(Italy) Luigi De Canio	15 March 2016
Lazio	(Italy) Stefano Pioli	Sacked	3 April 2016	8th	(Italy) Simone Inzaghi (caretaker)	3 April 2016
Palermo	(Italy) Walter Novellino	Sacked	11 April 2016	18th	(Italy) Davide Ballardini	12 April 2016
Milan	(Serbia) Siniša Mihajlović	Sacked	12 April 2016	6th	(Italy) Cristian Brocchi	12 April 2016

== League table ==
Pos	Team	Pld	W	D	L	GF	GA	GD	Pts	Qualification or relegation
1	Juventus (C)	38	29	4	5	75	20	+55	91	Qualification to Champions League group stage
2	Napoli	38	25	7	6	80	32	+48	82	Qualification to Champions League group stage
3	Roma	38	23	11	4	83	41	+42	80	Qualification to Champions League play-off round
4	Internazionale	38	20	7	11	50	38	+12	67	Qualification to Europa League group stage (Note: Since the winners of the 2015–16 Coppa Italia, Juventus, qualified for European competition based on league position, the spot awarded to the cup winners (Europa League group stage) was passed to fifth-placed team and the spot awarded to the fifth-placed team (Europa League third qualifying round) was passed to the sixth-placed team.)
5	Fiorentina	38	18	10	10	60	42	+18	64	Qualification to Europa League group stage
6	Sassuolo	38	16	13	9	49	40	+9	61	Qualification to Europa League third qualifying round
7	Milan	38	15	12	11	49	43	+6	57	
8	Lazio	38	15	9	14	52	52	0	54	
9	Chievo	38	13	11	14	43	45	−2	50	
10	Empoli	38	12	10	16	40	49	−9	46 (Note: Empoli ahead of Genoa on head-to-head goal difference; Empoli +1, Genoa –1.)	
11	Genoa	38	13	7	18	45	48	−3	46	
12	Torino	38	12	9	17	52	55	−3	45 (Note: Torino ahead of Atalanta on head-to-head points; Torino 6 points, Atalanta 0 points.)	
13	Atalanta	38	11	12	15	41	47	−6	45	
14	Bologna	38	11	9	18	33	45	−12	42	
15	Sampdoria	38	10	10	18	48	61	−13	40	
16	Palermo	38	10	9	19	38	65	−27	39 (Note: Palermo ahead of Udinese on head-to-head points; Palermo 6 points, Udinese 0 points.)	
17	Udinese	38	10	9	19	35	60	−25	39	
18	Carpi (R)	38	9	11	18	37	57	−20	38	Relegation to Serie B
19	Frosinone (R)	38	8	7	23	35	76	−41	31	Relegation to Serie B
20	Hellas Verona (R)	38	5	13	20	34	63	−29	28	Relegation to Serie B

Source: Serie A, Soccerway
Rules for classification: 1) Points; 2) Head-to-head points; 3) Head-to-head goal difference; 4) Goal difference; 5) Goals scored; 6) Draw.
(C) Champions; (R) Relegated

== Results ==
Home \ Away	ATA	BOL	CRP	CHV	EMP	FIO	FRO	GEN	HEL	INT	JUV	LAZ	MIL	NAP	PAL	ROM	SAM	SAS	TOR	UDI
Atalanta		2–0	3–0	1–0	0–0	2–3	2–0	0–2	1–1	1–1	0–2	2–1	2–1	1–3	3–0	3–3	2–1	1–1	0–1	1–1
Bologna	3–0		0–0	0–1	2–3	1–1	1–0	2–0	0–1	0–1	0–0	2–2	0–1	3–2	0–1	2–2	3–2	0–1	0–1	1–2
Carpi	1–1	1–2		1–2	1–0	0–1	2–1	4–1	0–0	1–2	2–3	1–3	0–0	0–0	1–1	1–3	2–1	1–3	2–1	2–1
Chievo	1–0	0–0	1–0		1–1	0–0	5–1	1–0	1–1	0–1	0–4	4–0	0–0	0–1	3–1	3–3	1–1	1–1	1–0	2–3
Empoli	0–1	0–0	3–0	1–3		2–0	1–2	2–0	1–0	0–1	1–3	1–0	2–2	2–2	0–0	1–3	1–1	1–0	2–1	1–1
Fiorentina	3–0	2–0	2–1	2–0	2–2		4–1	1–0	1–1	2–1	1–2	1–3	2–0	1–1	0–0	1–2	1–1	3–1	2–0	3–0
Frosinone	0–0	1–0	2–1	0–2	2–0	0–0		2–2	3–2	0–1	0–2	0–0	2–4	1–5	0–2	0–2	2–0	0–1	1–2	2–0
Genoa	1–2	0–1	1–2	3–2	1–0	0–0	4–0		2–0	1–0	0–2	0–0	1–0	0–0	4–0	2–3	2–3	2–1	3–2	2–1
Hellas Verona	2–1	0–2	1–2	3–1	0–1	0–2	1–2	1–1		3–3	2–1	1–2	2–1	0–2	0–1	1–1	0–3	1–1	2–2	1–1
Internazionale	1–0	2–1	1–1	1–0	2–1	1–4	4–0	1–0	1–0		0–0	1–2	1–0	2–0	3–1	1–0	3–1	0–1	1–2	3–1
Juventus	2–0	3–1	2–0	1–1	1–0	3–1	1–1	1–0	3–0	2–0		3–0	1–0	1–0	4–0	1–0	5–0	1–0	2–1	0–1
Lazio	2–0	2–1	0–0	4–1	2–0	2–4	2–0	2–0	5–2	2–0	0–2		1–3	0–2	1–1	1–4	1–1	0–2	3–0	2–0
Milan	0–0	0–1	0–0	1–0	2–1	2–0	3–3	2–1	1–1	3–0	1–2	1–1		0–4	3–2	1–3	4–1	2–1	1–0	1–1
Napoli	2–1	6–0	1–0	3–1	5–1	2–1	4–0	3–1	3–0	2–1	2–1	5–0	1–1		2–0	0–0	2–2	3–1	2–1	1–0
Palermo	2–2	0–0	2–2	1–0	0–1	1–3	4–1	1–0	3–2	1–1	0–3	0–3	0–2	0–1		2–4	2–0	0–1	1–3	4–1
Roma	0–2	1–1	5–1	3–0	3–1	4–1	3–1	2–0	1–1	1–1	2–1	2–0	1–1	1–0	5–0		2–1	2–2	3–2	3–1
Sampdoria	0–0	2–0	5–2	0–1	1–1	0–2	2–0	0–3	4–1	1–1	1–2	2–1	0–1	2–4	2–0	2–1		1–3	2–2	2–0
Sassuolo	2–2	0–2	1–0	1–1	3–2	1–1	2–2	0–1	1–0	3–1	1–0	2–1	2–0	2–1	2–2	0–2	0–0		1–1	1–1
Torino	2–1	2–0	0–0	1–2	0–1	3–1	4–2	3–3	0–0	0–1	1–4	1–1	1–1	1–2	2–1	1–1	2–0	1–3		0–1
Udinese	2–1	0–1	1–2	0–0	1–2	2–1	1–0	1–1	2–0	0–4	0–4	0–0	2–3	3–1	0–1	1–2	1–0	0–0	1–5	

Source: Serie A
Legend: Blue = home team win; Yellow = draw; Red = away team win.

== Attendances ==
Pos	Team	Total	High	Low	Average	Change
1	Internazionale	865,226	79,154	31,494	45,538	+22.2%
2	Napoli	736,434	56,452	18,766	38,760	+20.1%
3	Juventus	734,580	41,305	28,899	38,662	+0.3%
4	Milan	719,352	77,043	25,517	37,861	+3.3%
5	Roma	668,449	55,508	27,000	35,182	−12.3%
6	Fiorentina	545,947	36,297	22,791	28,734	−5.2%
7	Sampdoria	417,513	31,375	20,223	21,974	+1.1%
8	Genoa	405,813	31,770	19,061	21,359	+6.6%
9	Lazio	399,471	31,108	10,000	21,025	−39.8%
10	Torino	368,449	25,868	14,327	19,392	+16.2%
11	Bologna	359,078	29,463	15,576	18,899	+24.5%^{1}
12	Hellas Verona	345,678	23,423	15,198	18,194	−5.7%
13	Palermo	324,241	33,445	10,223	18,013	+3.0%
14	Udinese	307,974	25,467	12,704	16,209	+81.9%
15	Atalanta	302,959	19,770	12,352	15,945	+5.2%
16	Sassuolo	217,298	20,570	7,000	11,437	−10.9%
17	Chievo	213,700	25,000	7,500	11,247	+5.6%
18	Empoli	180,695	14,693	7,309	9,510	+3.0%
19	Carpi	170,393	17,775	5,268	8,968	+197.0%^{1}
20	Frosinone	138,478	9,400	6,007	7,288	+38.9%^{1}
	League total	8,241,728	79,154	5,268	22,221	+0.7%

Updated to games played on 15 May 2016
Source: Stadia Postcards
Notes:
^{1} Team played last season in Serie B.

== Season statistics ==
=== Top goalscorers ===
Rank	Player	Club	Goals
1	(Argentina) Gonzalo Higuaín	Napoli	36
2	(Argentina) Paulo Dybala	Juventus	19
3	(Colombia) Carlos Bacca	Milan	18
4	(Argentina) Mauro Icardi	Internazionale	16
5	(Italy) Leonardo Pavoletti	Genoa	14
5	(Egypt) Mohamed Salah	Roma	14
7	(Italy) Éder	Sampdoria/Internazionale	13
7	(Slovenia) Josip Iličić	Fiorentina	13
7	(Italy) Massimo Maccarone	Empoli	13
10	(Italy) Andrea Belotti	Torino	12
10	(Italy) Lorenzo Insigne	Napoli	12
10	(Croatia) Nikola Kalinić	Fiorentina	12

=== Hat-tricks ===
Player	Club	Against	Result	Date
(Croatia) Nikola Kalinić	Fiorentina	Internazionale	4–1 Archived 1 November 2016 at the Wayback Machine	27 September 2015
(Spain) Suso	Genoa	Frosinone	4–0 Archived 22 April 2016 at the Wayback Machine	3 April 2016
(Belgium) Dries Mertens	Napoli	Bologna	6–0 Archived 7 May 2016 at the Wayback Machine	19 April 2016
(Argentina) Gonzalo Higuaín	Napoli	Frosinone	4–0 Archived 16 May 2016 at the Wayback Machine	14 May 2016

== Awards ==
Gran Galà del Calcio AIC: 2015–16 Individual Awards
Player of the Year (MVP)	(Italy) Leonardo Bonucci (Juventus)
Coach of the Year	(Italy) Massimiliano Allegri (Juventus)
Club of the Year	(Italy) Juventus
Goalkeeper of the Year	(Italy) Gianluigi Buffon (Juventus)

AIC Team of the Year: 2015–16 Serie A
Goalkeeper	(Italy) Gianluigi Buffon (Juventus)			
Defenders	(Italy) Andrea Barzagli (Juventus)	(Senegal) Kalidou Koulibaly (Napoli)	(Italy) Leonardo Bonucci (Juventus)	(Italy) Giorgio Chiellini (Juventus)
Midfielders	(Belgium) Radja Nainggolan (Roma)	(Slovakia) Marek Hamšík (Napoli)	(France) Paul Pogba (Juventus)	(Bosnia and Herzegovina) Miralem Pjanić (Roma)
Forwards	(Argentina) Paulo Dybala (Juventus)		(Argentina) Gonzalo Higuaín (Napoli)	
