= Roberto Crivello =

Italian footballer

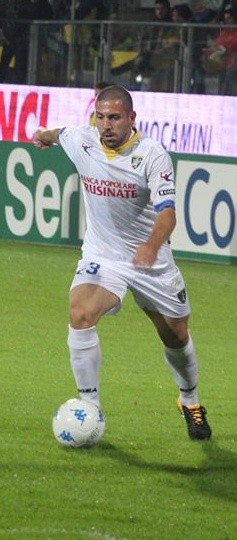

Personal information
- Date of birth: 14 September 1991 (age 35)
- Place of birth: Palermo, Italy
- Height: 1.80 m (5 ft 11 in)
- Position: Left back

Team information
- Current team: Athletic Club Palermo

Youth career
- Parmonval
- Juventus

Senior career*
Years	Team	Apps	(Gls)
2009–2011	Juventus	0	(0)
2010	→ Carrarese (loan)	0	(0)
2011	→ Gela (loan)	2	(0)
2011–2013	San Marino	48	(0)
2013–2018	Frosinone	103	(2)
2018–2019	Spezia	9	(0)
2019–2023	Palermo	74	(0)
2023	→ Padova (loan)	14	(0)
2024	Monterosi	9	(0)
2024–	Athletic Club Palermo	41	(1)
- * Club domestic league appearances and goals as of 7 March 2026 ‡ National team caps and goals as of 11 July 2015

Roberto Crivello (born 14 September 1991) is an Italian footballer who plays as a left back for Serie D club Athletic Club Palermo.

== Career ==
Crivello started his career as a youth player with Mondello club Parmonval, before being scouted and signed by Juventus in 2009.

In 2013 he joined Lega Pro Prima Divisione club Frosinone, with whom he won two consecutive promotions and made his Serie A debut in 2015. He was also part of Frosinone's 2018 squad that won their second Serie A promotion in the club's history.

In 2018 he joined Serie B club Spezia. In August 2019 he rescinded his contract with Spezia and joined hometown club Palermo (Serie D level) as a free transfer. He was part of Palermo's squad that won promotion to Serie C and then to Serie B in 2022.

On 6 January 2023, after appearing sparingly for the Rosanero in the first half of the club's 2022–23 Serie B campaign, Crivello was loaned out to Serie C club Padova until the end of the season.

On 1 September 2023, Palermo announced to have agreed with Crivello to release him from his contract.

On 31 January 2024, Crivello signed for Serie C club Monterosi on a contract until the end of the season.

After suffering relegation with Monterosi and being released by the end of the season, Crivello signed for Eccellenza Sicily amateurs Athletic Club Palermo on 14 September 2024.

== Career statistics ==
=== Club ===
As of 5 June 2022

Appearances and goals by club, season and competition
Club	Season	League			National cup		Other		Total	
Club	Season	Division	Apps	Goals	Apps	Goals	Apps	Goals	Apps	Goals
Carrarese (loan)	2010–11	Lega Pro Seconda Divisione	0	0	0	0	—		0	0
Gela (loan)	2010–11	Lega Pro Prima Divisione	2	0	0	0	—		2	0
San Marino	2011–12	Lega Pro Seconda Divisione	26	0	0	0	—		26	0
San Marino	2012–13	Lega Pro Prima Divisione	22	0	1	0	—		23	0
San Marino	Total		48	0	1	0	0	0	49	0
Frosinone	2013–14	Lega Pro Prima Divisione	21	0	3	0	4 (Note: All appearance(s) in promotion play-offs.)	0	28	0
Frosinone	2014–15	Serie B	29	0	1	0	—		30	0
Frosinone	2015–16	Serie A	17	0	1	0	—		18	0
Frosinone	2016–17	Serie B	20	0	2	0	2	0	24	0
Frosinone	2017–18	Serie B	16	2	2	1	4	0	22	3
Frosinone	Total		103	2	9	1	10	0	122	3
Spezia	2018–19	Serie B	9	0	0	0	0	0	9	0
Palermo	2019–20	Serie D	22	0	1	0	—		23	0
Palermo	2020–21	Serie C	24	0	—		0	0	24	0
Palermo	2021–22	Serie C	16	0	1	0	6	0	23	0
Palermo	Total		62	0	2	0	6	0	70	0
Career total			224	2	12	1	16	0	252	3
