= Danilo Soddimo =

Italian footballer (born 1987)

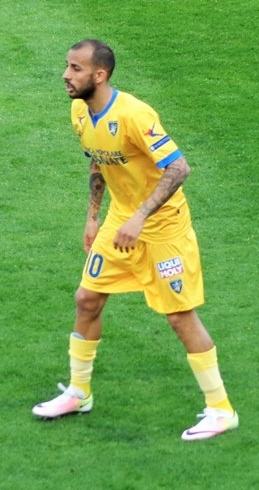
- Frosinone football player, 2017

Personal information
- Date of birth: 27 September 1987 (age 39)
- Place of birth: Rome, Italy
- Height: 1.85 m (6 ft 1 in)
- Position: Winger

Youth career
- 2004–2007: Sampdoria

Senior career*
| Years | Team | Apps | (Gls) |
| 2006–2010 | Sampdoria | 3 | (0) |
| 2007–2008 | → Sambenedettese (loan) | 20 | (3) |
| 2008–2009 | → Ancona (loan) | 26 | (3) |
| 2009–2010 | → Salernitana (loan) | 8 | (0) |
| 2010–2013 | Pescara | 63 | (7) |
| 2013 | → Grosseto (loan) | 15 | (0) |
| 2013–2018 | Frosinone | 151 | (12) |
| 2019–2020 | Cremonese | 31 | (2) |
| 2020–2021 | Pisa | 30 | (2) |

International career
| 2004 | Italy U-18 | 3 | (0) |
| 2006 | Italy U-19 | 7 | (0) |
| 2007 | Italy U-21 | 9 | (1) |
- * Club domestic league appearances and goals as of 10 May 2021

Danilo Soddimo (born 27 September 1987) is an Italian footballer.

== Background ==
He has gradually made his way through the Sampdoria's youth system, and made his Serie A debut on April 30, 2006, in a home match against Udinese. He was loaned out to Sambenedettese during the 2007 summer transfer window in order to let him achieve some first team experience.

In July 2009, he was loaned to Salernitana. but in January 2010 the loan was canceled. He then joined Pescara in co-ownership deal for €300,000. (swapped with 50% rights of Loris Bacchetti also for €300,000) In June 2010 Pescara acquired the full rights of Soddimo also for €300,000, with Emanuele Testardi joined Sampdoria for €450,000.

He extended his contract to June 2014 in December 2010. In January 2013 Soddimo was signed by Serie B club U.S. Grosseto F.C. in temporary deal.

In July 2013 he was signed by Frosinone.

On 8 January 2019, he signed a multi-year contract with Serie B club Cremonese.

On 16 January 2020, he signed with Serie B club Pisa for a term of 1.5-years with an option for an additional season.
