= Alessandro Frara =

Italian footballer (born 1982)

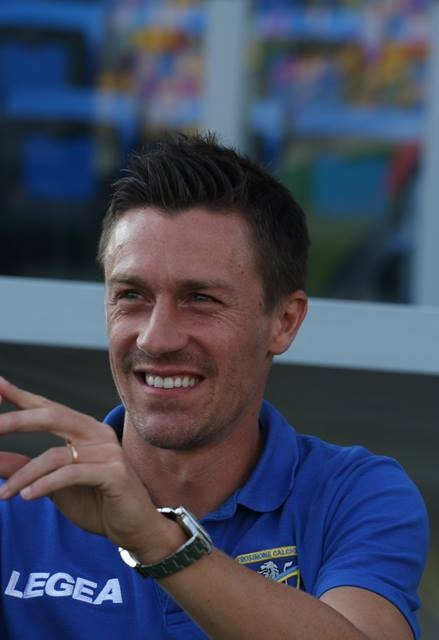

Personal information
- Date of birth: 7 November 1982 (age 43)
- Place of birth: Turin, Italy
- Height: 1.77 m (5 ft 10 in)
- Position: Midfielder

Youth career
- –2002: Juventus

Senior career*
Years	Team	Apps	(Gls)
2002–2003	Juventus	0	(0)
2002–2003	→ Bologna (loan)	19	(0)
2003–2007	Ternana	67	(0)
2006–2007	→ Spezia (loan)	48	(0)
2008–2010	Rimini	51	(5)
2010–2011	Varese	30	(2)
2011–2018	Frosinone	169	(15)
Total		384	(22)

International career
1998	Italy U16	1	(0)
1998–2001	Italy U18	4	(0)
- * Club domestic league appearances and goals as of 8 July 2018

Alessandro Frara (born 7 November 1982) is a former Italian footballer who played as a midfielder.

== Career ==
Frara started his career at hometown club Juventus. With the Italian giant, he played at youth side until June 2002. In June 2002, he was loaned to Bologna and made his Serie A debut on 14 September 2002, against A.S. Roma.

In January 2008 he was signed by Rimini. But he suffered from leg injuries and had an operation in May. He played his first game for Rimini in 2008–09 season.

He scored his first Serie A goal with Frosinone on 1 November 2015 in a 4–1 loss to Fiorentina.
