= Nunzio Di Roberto =

Italian footballer

Personal information
- Date of birth: 21 September 1985 (age 41)
- Place of birth: Naples, Italy
- Height: 1.77 m (5 ft 10 in)
- Position: Midfielder

Team information
- Current team: Cavese

Youth career
- –2004: Napoli

Senior career*
Years	Team	Apps	(Gls)
2003–2004	Napoli	2	(0)
2003	→ Torres (loan)	0	(0)
2004–2006	Giugliano	51	(3)
2006	→ Potenza (loan)	13	(2)
2006–2008	Foggia	21	(3)
2008–2009	Frosinone	20	(1)
2009	Foggia	15	(1)
2010	Taranto	11	(0)
2010–2014	Cittadella	128	(26)
2014–2015	Varese	19	(1)
2014–2015	→ Pro Vercelli (loan)	37	(3)
2015–2016	Pro Vercelli	24	(1)
2016–2017	Crotone	15	(0)
2016–2017	→ Cesena (loan)	19	(1)
2017–2018	Salernitana	17	(0)
2018–2019	Juve Stabia	18	(1)
2019–	Cavese	12	(2)
- * Club domestic league appearances and goals as of 23:49, 3 December 2019 (UTC)

Nunzio Di Roberto (born 21 September 1985) is an Italian former footballer.

== Club career ==
He made his Serie B debut for Napoli in early 2004.

After playing more than 250 games in the second-tier Serie B, he finally made his top-level Serie A debut for Crotone at the age of 30 on 28 August 2016 as a late substitute in a game against Genoa. Three days later he was loaned back to the Serie B, to Cesena.

On 17 August 2018, he signed a two-year contract with Serie C club Juve Stabia.

On 23 July 2019, he signed with Cavese.
