= Stadio Matusa =

Multi-use stadium in Frosinone, Italy

Coordinates: 41°38′16″N 13°20′35″E

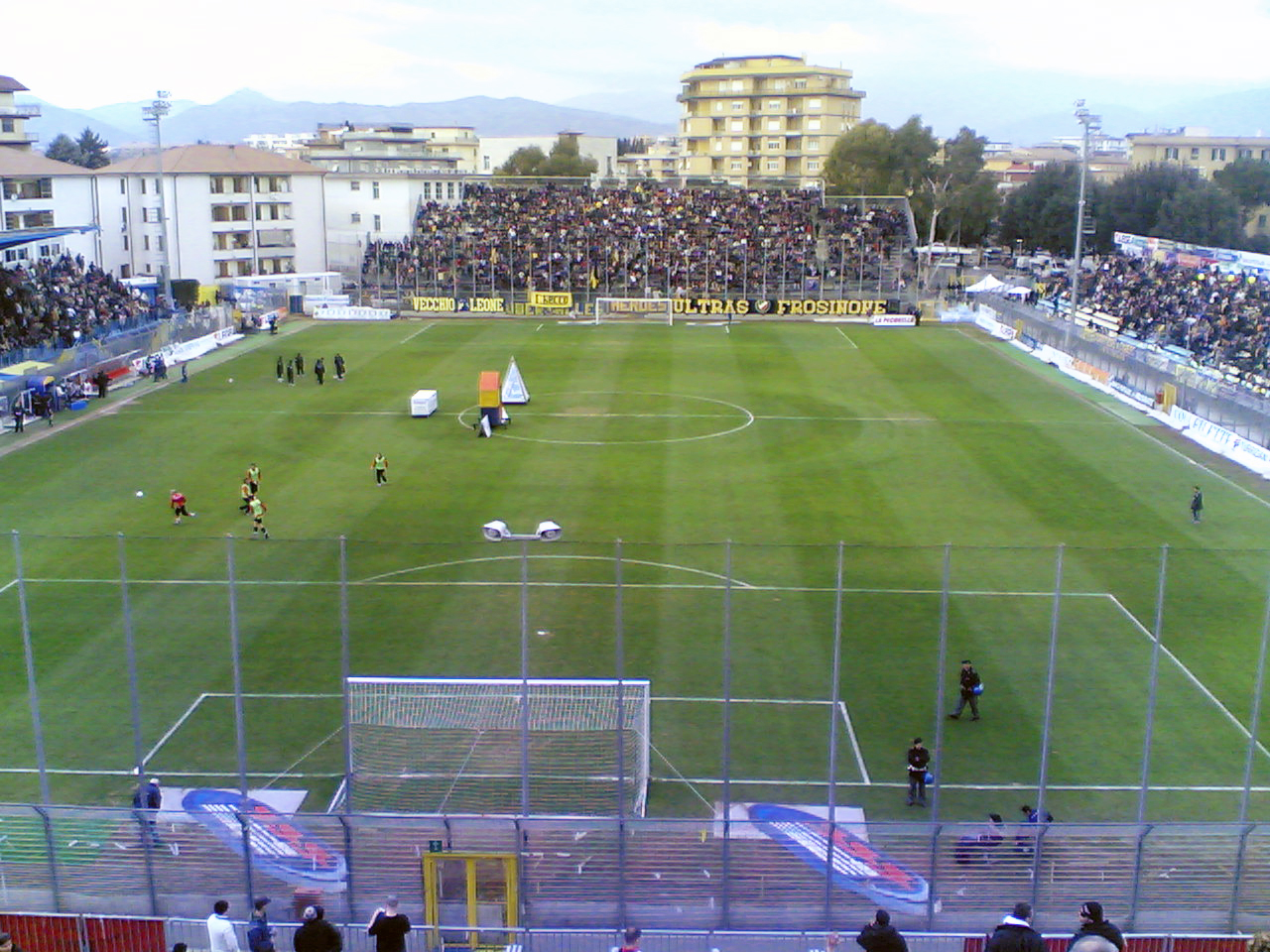
- Interactive map of Stadio Matusa
- Former names: Stadio Comunale
- Location: Frosinone, Italy
- Owner: Municipality of Frosinone
- Capacity: 10,000
- Surface: Grass; 100x65m

Construction
- Groundbreaking: 1932
- Opened: 1932
- Renovated: 2006, 2015
- Closed: 2017
- Demolished: 2017

Tenant
- Frosinone Calcio (1932–2017)

Stadio Comunale Matusa was a multi-use stadium in Frosinone, Italy. It was used mostly for football matches and was the home ground of Frosinone Calcio — replaced by Stadio Benito Stirpe. The stadium holds 10,000.
