= 2019–20 Frosinone Calcio season =

Frosinone
2019–20 season
- Chairman: Maurizio Stirpe
- Manager: Alessandro Nesta
- Stadium: Stadio Benito Stirpe
- Serie B: 8th
- Coppa Italia: Fourth round
Home colours	Away colours	Third colours

The 2019–20 Frosinone Calcio season is Frosinone Calcio's first season back in second division of the Italian football league, the Serie B, and the 31st as a football club. Besides the Serie B, the club also competed in the 2019–20 Coppa Italia, losing in the fourth round to Serie A side Parma.

== Players ==
=== First-team squad ===
As of 27 January 2020

Note: Flags indicate national team as defined under FIFA eligibility rules; some limited exceptions apply. Players may hold more than one non-FIFA nationality.

No.	Pos.	Nation	Player
1	GK	ITA	Alessandro Iacobucci
2	DF	ITA	Francesco Zampano
3	DF	ITA	Marco Capuano
4	DF	ITA	Francesco Verde
5	MF	ITA	Mirko Gori (Captain)
7	MF	ITA	Luca Paganini
8	MF	ITA	Raffaele Maiello
9	FW	ITA	Nicola Citro
10	FW	ITA	Federico Dionisi (Vice-Captain)
11	MF	SUI	Nicolas Haas (on loan from Atalanta)
13	DF	ITA	Andrea Beghetto
14	DF	ITA	Alessandro Salvi
15	DF	ITA	Lorenzo Ariaudo
17	MF	SWE	Marcus Rohdén

No.	Pos.	Nation	Player
18	FW	USA	Andrija Novakovich
19	FW	ITA	Luca Matarese
20	MF	ITA	Alessio Tribuzzi
21	MF	ITA	Andrea Tabanelli
22	GK	ITA	Francesco Bardi
23	DF	ITA	Nicolò Brighenti
24	MF	ITA	Mattia Vitale (on loan from SPAL)
25	DF	POL	Przemysław Szymiński
28	FW	ITA	Camillo Ciano
30	GK	ITA	Paolo Bastianello
32	DF	SLO	Luka Krajnc
33	DF	ITA	Salvatore D'Elia
45	FW	ITA	Matteo Ardemagni

=== Out on loan ===
Note: Flags indicate national team as defined under FIFA eligibility rules; some limited exceptions apply. Players may hold more than one non-FIFA nationality.

No.	Pos.	Nation	Player
—	MF	GHA	Emmanuel Besea (at Viterbese until 30 June 2020)
—	MF	ITA	Andrea Errico (at Viterbese until 30 June 2020)
—	FW	CRC	Joel Campbell (at Club León until 30 June 2020)

No.	Pos.	Nation	Player
—	FW	ITA	Marcello Trotta (at Ascoli until 30 June 2020)
—	FW	ITA	Michele Volpe (at Viterbese until 30 June 2020)

== Competitions ==
=== Overview ===
Competition	First match	Last match	Starting round	Final position	Record							
Competition	First match	Last match	Starting round	Final position	Pld	W	D	L	GF	GA	GD	Win %
Serie B	25 August 2019	31 July 2020	Matchday 1	8th	38	14	12	12	41	38	+3	36.84
Serie B promotion play-offs	5 August 2020	20 August 2020	Preliminary round	Finals	5	3	0	2	6	4	+2	60.00
Coppa Italia	11 August 2019	5 December 2019	Second round	Fourth round	3	2	0	1	10	3	+7	66.67
Total					46	19	12	15	57	45	+12	41.30

Source: Soccerway

=== Serie B ===
==== League table ====
Pos	Team	Pld	W	D	L	GF	GA	GD	Pts	Promotion, qualification or relegation
6	Chievo	38	14	14	10	48	38	+10	56	Qualification for promotion play-offs preliminary round
7	Empoli	38	14	12	12	47	48	−1	54 (Note: Head-to-head points: Empoli 9, Frosinone 5, Pisa 2.)	Qualification for promotion play-offs preliminary round
8	Frosinone	38	14	12	12	41	38	+3	54	Qualification for promotion play-offs preliminary round
9	Pisa	38	14	12	12	49	45	+4	54	
10	Salernitana	38	14	10	14	53	50	+3	52	

Source: Lega Serie B (in Italian) SOCCERWAY (in English)
Rules for classification: 1) Points; 2) Head-to-head points; 3) Head-to-head goal difference; 4) Goal difference; 5) Goals scored; 6) Draw.

==== Results summary ====
Overall								Home						Away					
Pld	W	D	L	GF	GA	GD	Pts	W	D	L	GF	GA	GD	W	D	L	GF	GA	GD
38	14	12	12	41	38	+3	54	10	5	4	29	18	+11	4	7	8	12	20	−8

==== Results by round ====
Round	1	2	3	4	5	6	7	8	9	10	11	12	13	14	15	16	17	18	19	20	21	22	23	24	25	26	27	28	29	30	31	32	33	34	35	36	37	38
Ground																																						
Result	L	W	L	D	L	D	D	W	D	W	D	W	L	W	W	W	L	L	D	D	W	W	W	W	W	W	D	L	D	L	L	W	L	D	D	L	L	D
Position	20	14	15	15	17	15	15	15	16	13	12	11	13	10	5	3	3	7	6	8	5	4	4	3	2	2	2	3	3	5	6	5	6	6	5	5	8	8

A = Away; H = Home; W = Win; D = Draw; L = Loss

==== Matches ====
26 August 2019 1	Pordenone	3–0	Frosinone	Udine
21:00 CEST (UTC+2)				Stadium: Stadio Friuli

1 September 2019 2	Frosinone	2–1	Ascoli	Frosinone
CEST (UTC+2)				Stadium: Stadio Benito Stirpe

14 September 2019 3	Virtus Entella	1–0	Frosinone	Chiavari
15:00 CEST (UTC+2)				Stadium: Stadio Comunale

20 September 2019 4	Frosinone	1–1	Venezia	Frosinone
CEST (UTC+2)				Stadium: Stadio Benito Stirpe

24 September 2019 5	Perugia	3–1	Frosinone	Perugia
CEST (UTC+2)				Stadium: Stadio Renato Curi

28 September 2019 6	Frosinone	1–1	Cosenza	Frosinone
CEST (UTC+2)				Stadium: Stadio Benito Stirpe

6 October 2019 7	Salernitana	1–1	Frosinone	Salerno
CEST (UTC+2)				Stadium: Stadio Arechi

21 October 2019 8	Frosinone	1–0	Livorno	Frosinone
CEST (UTC+2)				Stadium: Stadio Benito Stirpe

27 October 2019 9	Cremonese	1–1	Frosinone	Cremona
CEST (UTC+2)				Stadium: Stadio Giovanni Zini

30 October 2019 10	Frosinone	3–0	Trapani	Frosinone
CET (UTC+1)				Stadium: Stadio Benito Stirpe

3 November 2019 11	Cittadella	0–0	Frosinone	Cittadella
CET (UTC+1)				Stadium: Stadio Pier Cesare Tombolato

10 November 2019 12	Frosinone	2–0	Chievo	Frosinone
CET (UTC+1)				Stadium: Stadio Benito Stirpe

24 November 2019 13	Spezia	2–0	Frosinone	La Spezia
CET (UTC+1)				Stadium: Alberto Picco

30 November 2019 14	Frosinone	4–0	Empoli	Frosinone
CET (UTC+1)				Stadium: Stadio Benito Stirpe

8 December 2019 15	Juve Stabia	0–2	Frosinone	Castellammare di Stabia
CET (UTC+1)				Stadium: Stadio Romeo Menti

14 December 2019 16	Frosinone	2–0	Pescara	Frosinone
CET (UTC+1)				Stadium: Stadio Benito Stirpe

21 December 2019 17	Benevento	1–0	Frosinone	Benevento
CET (UTC+1)				Stadium: Stadio Ciro Vigorito

26 December 2019 18	Frosinone	1–2	Crotone	Frosinone
15:00 CET (UTC+1)				Stadium: Stadio Benito Stirpe

29 December 2019 19	Pisa	0–0	Frosinone	Pisa
CET (UTC+1)				Stadium: Arena Garibaldi – Stadio Romeo Anconetani

17 January 2020 20	Frosinone	2–2	Pordenone	Frosinone
CET (UTC+1)				Stadium: Stadio Benito Stirpe

26 January 2020 21	Ascoli	0–1	Frosinone	Ascoli Piceno
CET (UTC+1)				Stadium: Stadio Cino e Lillo Del Duca

1 February 2020 22	Frosinone	1–0	Virtus Entella	Frosinone
CET (UTC+1)				Stadium: Stadio Benito Stirpe

8 February 2020 23	Venezia	0–1	Frosinone	Venice
CET (UTC+1)				Stadium: Pier Luigi Penzo Stadium

16 February 2020 24	Frosinone	1–0	Perugia	Frosinone
CET (UTC+1)				Stadium: Stadio Benito Stirpe

21 February 2020 25	Cosenza	0–2	Frosinone	Cosenza
CEST (UTC+2)				Stadium: Stadio San Vito-Gigi Marulla

29 February 2020 26	Frosinone	1–0	Salernitana	Frosinone
CET (UTC+1)				Stadium: Stadio Benito Stirpe

3 March 2020 27	Livorno	2–2	Frosinone	Livorno
CET (UTC+1)				Stadium: Armando Picchi Stadium

7 March 2020 28	Frosinone	0–2	Cremonese	Frosinone
CET (UTC+1)				Stadium: Stadio Benito Stirpe

20 June 2020 29	Trapani	0–0	Frosinone	Trapani
CEST (UTC+2)				Stadium: Stadio Polisportivo Provinciale

26 June 2020 30	Frosinone	0–2	Cittadella	Frosinone
CET (UTC+1)				Stadium: Stadio Benito Stirpe

29 June 2020 31	Chievo	2–0	Frosinone	Verona
CEST (UTC+2)				Stadium: Marcantonio Bentegodi

3 July 2020 32	Frosinone	2–1	Spezia	Frosinone
CEST (UTC+2)				Stadium: Stadio Benito Stirpe

10 July 2020 33	Empoli	2–0	Frosinone	Empoli
21:00 CEST (UTC+2)				Stadium: Stadio Carlo Castellani

13 July 2020 34	Frosinone	2–2	Juve Stabia	Frosinone
CEST (UTC+2)				Stadium: Stadio Benito Stirpe

17 July 2020 35	Pescara	1–1	Frosinone	Pescara
CEST (UTC+2)				Stadium: Stadio Adriatico – Giovanni Cornacchia

24 July 2020 36	Frosinone	2–3	Benevento	Frosinone
21:00 CEST (UTC+2)				Stadium: Stadio Benito Stirpe

27 July 2020 37	Crotone	1–0	Frosinone	Crotone
21:00 CEST (UTC+2)				Stadium: Stadio Ezio Scida

31 July 2020 38	Frosinone	1–1	Pisa	Frosinone
21:00 CEST (UTC+2)				Stadium: Stadio Benito Stirpe

==== Promotion play-offs ====
5 August 2020 Preliminary round	Cittadella	2–3 (a.e.t.)	Frosinone	Cittadella
21:00 CEST (UTC+2)	Diaw 5' (pen.), 45+1'	Report	Salvi 45+4'; Dionisi 51'; Ciano 120+1'	Stadium: Pier Cesare Tombolato; Attendance: 0 Referee: Simone Sozza

9 August 2020 Semi-finals; First leg	Frosinone	0–1	Pordenone	Frosinone
21:00 CEST (UTC+2)		Report	Tremolada 82'	Stadium: Benito Stirpe; Attendance: 0 Referee: Luca Massimi

12 August 2020 Semi-finals; Second leg	Pordenone	0–2 (1–2 agg.)	Frosinone	Trieste
21:00 CEST (UTC+2)		Report	Ciano 7'; Novakovich 15'	Stadium: Nereo Rocco; Attendance: 0 Referee: Manuel Volpi

16 August 2020 Finals; First leg	Frosinone	0–1	Spezia	Frosinone
21:15 CEST (UTC+2)		Report	Gyasi 21'	Stadium: Benito Stirpe; Attendance: 0 Referee: Francesco Fourneau

20 August 2020 Finals; Second leg	Spezia	0–1 (1–1 agg.)	Frosinone	La Spezia
21:15 CEST (UTC+2)		Report	Rohdén 61'	Stadium: Alberto Picco; Attendance: 0 Referee: Gianluca Sacchi

=== Coppa Italia ===
11 August 2019 Second round	Frosinone	4–0	Carrarese	Frosinone
20:30 CEST (UTC+2)	Cian0 10'; Paganini 43'; Ariaudo 49'; Tribuzzi 81'			Stadium: Stadio Benito Stirpe

18 August 2019 Third round	Frosinone	5–1	Monopoli	Frosinone
20:30 CEST (UTC+2)	Trotta 31', 36'; Ciano 57'; Citro 67'; Brighenti 75'		Ferrara 82'	Stadium: Stadio Benito Stirpe; Attendance: 4,109; Referee: Fabio Maresca

5 December 2019 Fourth round	Parma	2–1	Frosinone	Parma
18:00 CET (UTC+1)	Siligardi 20'; Hernani 90+2' (pen.)		Trotta 71'	Stadium: Stadio Ennio Tardini; Attendance: 1,190; Referee: Federico Dionisi
