= 2018–19 Frosinone Calcio season =

Frosinone
2018–19 season
- President: Maurizio Stirpe
- Manager: Moreno Longo (until 19 December); Marco Baroni (from 19 December)
- Stadium: Stadio Benito Stirpe
- Serie A: 19th (relegated)
- Coppa Italia: Third round
- Top goalscorer: League: Camillo Ciano (7); All: Camillo Ciano (7)
Home colours	Away colours	Third colours

The 2018–19 season was Frosinone Calcio's second-ever season in Serie A. The club were promoted as champions of Serie B at the end of the 2017–18 season, after spending two seasons in the second division following their maiden Serie A campaign in 2015–16. Frosinone competed in Serie A and the Coppa Italia.

== Players ==
=== Squad information ===
As of 20 January 2019
Appearances include league matches only

No.	Name	Nat	Position(s)	Date of birth (age)	Signed from	Signed in	Contract ends	Apps.	Goals	Notes
Goalkeepers
22	Francesco Bardi	(Italy)	GK	18 January 1992 (age 34)	(Italy) Internazionale	2015	–	68	0	
57	Marco Sportiello	(Italy)	GK	10 May 1992 (age 34)	(Italy) Atalanta	2018	2019	20	0	Loan
91	Alessandro Iacobucci	(Italy)	GK	3 June 1991 (age 34)	(Italy) Virtus Entella	2018	2020	0	0	
Defenders
	Stefan Simić	(Czech Republic)	CB / RB	20 January 1995 (age 31)	(Italy) Milan	2019	2019	0	0	Loan
2	Paolo Ghiglione	(Italy)	RB / RM	2 February 1997 (age 29)	(Italy) Genoa	2018	2019	6	0	Loan
3	Cristian Molinaro	(Italy)	LB	30 July 1983 (age 42)	(Italy) Torino	2018	2019	9	0	
6	Edoardo Goldaniga	(Italy)	CB	2 November 1993 (age 32)	(Italy) Sassuolo	2018	2019	17	1	Loan
15	Lorenzo Ariaudo	(Italy)	CB	11 June 1989 (age 36)	(Italy) Sassuolo	2016	2021	82	5	
17	Francesco Zampano	(Italy)	RB / RM	30 September 1993 (age 32)	(Italy) Pescara	2018	2019	18	0	Loan
23	Nicolò Brighenti	(Italy)	CB / RB	1 August 1989 (age 36)	(Italy) Vicenza	2016	2020	49	0	
25	Marco Capuano	(Italy)	CB	14 October 1991 (age 34)	(Italy) Cagliari	2018	2021	13	0	
27	Bartosz Salamon	(Poland)	CB / DM	1 May 1991 (age 35)	(Italy) SPAL	2018	2019	9	0	Loan
32	Luka Krajnc	(Slovenia)	CB	19 September 1994 (age 31)	(Italy) Cagliari	2017	–	53	0	
Midfielders
	Federico Viviani	(Italy)	DM	24 March 1992 (age 34)	(Italy) SPAL	2019	2019	0	0	Loan
4	Rai Vloet	(Netherlands)	AM	8 May 1995 (age 31)	(Switzerland) Chiasso	2018	2022	5	0	
5	Mirko Gori	(Italy)	CM	4 February 1993 (age 33)	(Italy) Frosinone Primavera	2012	2019	150	2	
8	Raffaele Maiello	(Italy)	CM	10 July 1991 (age 34)	(Italy) Napoli	2017	2022	74	2	
10	Danilo Soddimo	(Italy)	LM / RM / AM	27 September 1987 (age 38)	(Italy) Pescara	2013	2019	144	12	
16	Luca Valzania	(Italy)	CM	5 March 1996 (age 30)	(Italy) Atalanta	2019	2019	1	0	Loan
21	Paolo Sammarco	(Italy)	CM	17 March 1983 (age 43)	(Italy) Spezia	2015	2019	99	7	
24	Francesco Cassata	(Italy)	CM	16 July 1997 (age 28)	(Italy) Sassuolo	2018	2019	11	1	Loan
31	Emmanuel Besea	(Ghana)	CM	15 April 1997 (age 29)	(Italy) Modena	2017	–	6	0	
33	Andrea Beghetto	(Italy)	LM / CM	11 October 1994 (age 31)	(Italy) Genoa	2017	2022	44	1	
66	Raman Chibsah	(Ghana)	CM	10 March 1993 (age 33)	(Italy) Benevento	2018	2021	36	2	
88	Lorenzo Crisetig	(Italy)	CM	20 January 1993 (age 33)	(Italy) Bologna	2018	2019	8	0	Loan
Forwards
9	Daniel Ciofani	(Italy)	ST	31 July 1985 (age 40)	(Italy) Parma	2013	2019	193	69	Captain
11	Stipe Perica	(Croatia)	ST	7 July 1995 (age 30)	(Italy) Udinese	2018	2019	7	0	
18	Federico Dionisi	(Italy)	CF / RW / LW	16 June 1987 (age 38)	(Italy) Livorno	2014	2021	143	50	
19	Luca Matarese	(Italy)	LW	16 April 1998 (age 28)	(Italy) Genoa	2017	2020	11	0	
28	Camillo Ciano	(Italy)	RW / SS	22 February 1990 (age 36)	(Italy) Cesena	2017	2021	59	18	
29	Joel Campbell	(Costa Rica)	RW / LW / ST	26 June 1992 (age 33)	(England) Arsenal	2018	2021	17	0	
89	Andrea Pinamonti	(Italy)	ST	19 May 1999 (age 27)	(Italy) Internazionale	2018	2019	13	2	Loan
99	Joaquín Ardaiz	(Uruguay)	ST	11 January 1999 (age 27)	(Switzerland) Chiasso	2018	2019	1	0	Loan
	Marcello Trotta	(Italy)	ST	29 September 1992 (age 33)	(Italy) Sassuolo	2019		0	0	
Players transferred during the season
26	Emanuele Terranova	(Italy)	CB	14 April 1987 (age 39)	(Italy) Sassuolo	2017	2019	52	4	
20	Emil Hallfreðsson	(Iceland)	CM / LM	29 June 1984 (age 41)	(Italy) Udinese	2018	2020	6	0	

== Transfers ==
=== In ===
Date	Pos.	Player	Age	Moving from	Fee	Notes	Source
5 July 2018	MF	(Italy) Andrea Beghetto	23	(Italy) Genoa	Undisclosed		
11 July 2018	DF	(Italy) Cristian Molinaro	34	Unattached	Free		
31 July 2018	MF	(Iceland) Emil Hallfreðsson	34	(Italy) Udinese	Undisclosed		
15 August 2018	MF	(Netherlands) Rai Vloet	23	(Switzerland) Chiasso	Undisclosed		
17 August 2018	FW	(Costa Rica) Joel Campbell	26	(England) Arsenal	Undisclosed		
17 August 2018	DF	(Italy) Marco Capuano	26	(Italy) Cagliari	Undisclosed		
25 January 2019	FW	(Italy) Marcello Trotta	26	(Italy) Sassuolo	Undisclosed		

==== Loans in ====
Date	Pos.	Player	Age	Moving from	Fee	Notes	Source
6 July 2018	GK	(Italy) Marco Sportiello	26	(Italy) Atalanta	Loan	Loan with an option to buy	
10 July 2018	MF	(Italy) Lorenzo Crisetig	25	(Italy) Bologna	Loan	Loan with an option to buy	
15 July 2018	DF	(Italy) Edoardo Goldaniga	24	(Italy) Sassuolo	Loan		
18 July 2018	FW	(Croatia) Stipe Perica	23	(Italy) Udinese	Loan		
9 August 2018	DF	(Poland) Bartosz Salamon	27	(Italy) SPAL	Loan	Loan with an obligation to buy	
16 August 2018	DF	(Italy) Francesco Zampano	24	(Italy) Pescara	Loan	Loan with an obligation to buy for €2M	
17 August 2018	MF	(Italy) Francesco Cassata	21	(Italy) Sassuolo	Loan		
17 August 2018	FW	(Uruguay) Joaquín Ardaiz	19	(Switzerland) Chiasso			
17 August 2018	FW	(Italy) Andrea Pinamonti	19	(Italy) Internazionale	Loan		
8 January 2019	MF	(Italy) Luca Valzania	21	(Italy) Atalanta	Loan	Season-long loan deal	
24 January 2019	MF	(Italy) Federico Viviani	26	(Italy) SPAL	Loan	On loan for the rest of the season with an option to buy for €5.5M	
24 January 2019	DF	(Czech Republic) Stefan Simić	24	(Italy) Milan	Loan	On loan for the rest of the season with no option to buy	

=== Out ===
Date	Pos.	Player	Age	Moving to	Fee	Notes	Source
16 August 2018	DF	(Italy) Matteo Ciofani	30	(Italy) Pescara			
17 August 2018	DF	(Italy) Emanuele Terranova	31	(Italy) Cremonese			
22 January 2019	MF	(Iceland) Emil Hallfreðsson	34			Contract termination	

==== Loans out ====
Date	Pos.	Player	Age	Moving to	Fee	Notes	Source

== Competitions ==
=== Serie A ===
==== League table ====
Pos	Team	Pld	W	D	L	GF	GA	GD	Pts	Qualification or relegation
16	Fiorentina	38	8	17	13	47	45	+2	41 (Note: Positions determined by head-to-head points: Parma: 9 pts; Cagliari: 7 pts; Fiorentina: 1 pt.)	
17	Genoa	38	8	14	16	39	57	−18	38 (Note: Genoa finished ahead of Empoli on head-to-head points: Genoa 2–1 Empoli, Empoli 1–3 Genoa.)	
18	Empoli (R)	38	10	8	20	51	70	−19	38	Relegation to Serie B
19	Frosinone (R)	38	5	10	23	29	69	−40	25	Relegation to Serie B
20	Chievo (R)	38	2	14	22	25	75	−50	17 (Note: Chievo were deducted 3 points after being found guilty of false accounting.)	Relegation to Serie B

Source: Serie A, Soccerway
Rules for classification: 1) Points; 2) Head-to-head points; 3) Head-to-head goal difference; 4) Goal difference; 5) Goals scored; 6) Draw. (Note: Head-to-head record is used only after all the matches between the teams in question have been played).
(R) Relegated

==== Results summary ====
Overall								Home						Away					
Pld	W	D	L	GF	GA	GD	Pts	W	D	L	GF	GA	GD	W	D	L	GF	GA	GD
38	5	10	23	29	69	−40	25	1	6	12	14	38	−24	4	4	11	15	31	−16

Last updated: 25 May 2019.
Source: Competitive matches

==== Results by round ====
Round	1	2	3	4	5	6	7	8	9	10	11	12	13	14	15	16	17	18	19	20	21	22	23	24	25	26	27	28	29	30	31	32	33	34	35	36	37	38
Ground	A	H	A	H	H	A	H	A	H	A	A	H	A	H	A	H	A	H	A	H	A	H	A	A	H	A	H	A	H	H	A	H	A	H	A	H	A	H
Result	L	D	L	L	L	L	L	L	D	W	D	D	L	D	L	L	D	D	L	L	W	L	W	L	L	D	L	L	L	W	W	L	L	L	D	L	L	D
Position	20	16	19	19	19	19	19	19	19	19	19	19	19	19	19	19	19	19	19	19	19	19	19	19	19	19	19	19	19	19	19	19	19	19	19	19	19	19

Updated to match(es) played on 25 May 2019. Source: Competitive matches
A = Away; H = Home; W = Win; D = Draw; L = Loss

==== Matches ====
20 August 2018 1	Atalanta	4–0	Frosinone	Bergamo
20:30 CEST (UTC+02:00)	Gómez 14', 90+2'; Hateboer 48'; Pašalić 61'	Report	Perica (yellow card) 31'; Goldaniga (yellow card) 88'	Stadium: Stadio Atleti Azzurri d'Italia; Attendance: 18,257; Referee: Marco Piccinini

26 August 2018 2	Frosinone	0–0	Bologna	Turin
20:30 CEST (UTC+02:00)	Perica (yellow card) 61'; Krajnc (yellow card) 86'	Report	Okwonkwo (yellow card) 84'	Stadium: Stadio Olimpico Grande Torino; Attendance: 0 Referee: Gianluca Manganiello
Note: Match played at the Stadio Olimpico Grande Torino instead of Frosinone's home stadium as punishment for unsporting behavior during the 2017–18 Serie B promotion play-off against Palermo.

2 September 2018 3	Lazio	1–0	Frosinone	Rome
20:30 CEST (UTC+02:00)	Parolo (yellow card) 20'; Luis Alberto 49'	Report	Brighenti (yellow card) 3'; Ghiglione (yellow card) 90+2'	Stadium: Stadio Olimpico; Attendance: 32,000; Referee: Gianpaolo Calvarese

15 September 2018 4	Frosinone	0–5	Sampdoria	Frosinone
20:30 CEST (UTC+02:00)	Maiello (yellow card) 17'; Brighenti (yellow card) 34'; Soddimo (yellow card) 63'	Report	Quagliarella 10'; Defrel (yellow card) 22', (goal) 54', 86'; Caprari 47'; Kownacki 83' (pen.)	Stadium: Stadio Benito Stirpe; Attendance: 12,502; Referee: Massimiliano Irrati

23 September 2018 5	Frosinone	0–2	Juventus	Frosinone
20:30 CEST (UTC+02:00)	Perica (yellow card) 29'; Molinaro (yellow card) 62'; Sportiello (yellow card) 80'	Report	Bentancur (yellow card) 28'; Ronaldo 81'; Bernardeschi 90+4'	Stadium: Stadio Benito Stirpe; Attendance: 16,310; Referee: Piero Giacomelli

26 September 2018 6	Roma	4–0	Frosinone	Rome
21:00 CEST (UTC+02:00)	Ünder 2'; Pastore 28'; El Shaarawy 35'; Kolarov 87'	Report	Campbell (yellow card) 90+1'	Stadium: Stadio Olimpico; Attendance: 34,380; Referee: Marco Di Bello

30 September 2018 7	Frosinone	1–2	Genoa	Frosinone
15:00 CEST (UTC+02:00)	Goldaniga (yellow card) 20'; Ciano 41' (pen.); Hallfreðsson (yellow card) 56'; Campbell (yellow card) 61'	Report	Piątek 33', 36'; Sandro (yellow card) 70'; Mazzitelli (yellow card) 84'	Stadium: Stadio Benito Stirpe; Attendance: 12,384; Referee: Juan Luca Sacchi

5 October 2018 8	Torino	3–2	Frosinone	Turin
20:30 CEST (UTC+02:00)	Rincón 20'; Baselli 46'; Sirigu (yellow card) 59'; Izzo (yellow card) 69'; Berenguer 71'; Meïté (yellow card) 80'	Report	Ciano (yellow card) 11', (goal) 64'; Hallfreðsson (yellow card) 53'; Goldaniga 58'; Krajnc (yellow card) 60'	Stadium: Stadio Olimpico Grande Torino; Attendance: 16,554; Referee: Ivano Pezzuto

21 October 2018 9	Frosinone	3–3	Empoli	Frosinone
12:30 CEST (UTC+02:00)	Silvestre 8' (o.g.); Ciofani 54' (pen.), 63'; Molinaro (yellow card) 88'; Ciano (yellow card) 90+1'	Report	Zajc (yellow card) 6', (goal) 32'; Silvestre 48'; Maietta (yellow card) 69'; Uçan 79'; Bennacer (yellow card) 86'	Stadium: Stadio Benito Stirpe; Attendance: 12,287; Referee: Daniele Orsato

28 October 2018 10	SPAL	0–3	Frosinone	Ferrara
15:00 CET (UTC+01:00)	Fares (yellow card) 27'; Lazzari (yellow card) 39'; Schiattarella (yellow card) 49'	Report	Maiello (yellow card) 25'; Chibsah (yellow card) 34', (goal) 40'; Ciano (yellow card) 45+3', (goal) 53'; Sportiello (yellow card) 82'; Campbell (yellow card) 86'; Pinamonti 89', (yellow card) 90'	Stadium: Stadio Paolo Mazza; Attendance: 13,676; Referee: Daniele Chiffi

4 November 2018 11	Parma	0–0	Frosinone	Parma
15:00 CET (UTC+01:00)	Štulac (red card) 61'; Alves (yellow card) 71'	Report	Maiello (yellow card) 32'; Chibsah (yellow card) 38'; Goldaniga (yellow card) 71'; Gori (yellow card) 78'	Stadium: Stadio Ennio Tardini; Attendance: 14,004; Referee: Gianluca Manganiello

9 November 2018 12	Frosinone	1–1	Fiorentina	Frosinone
20:30 CET (UTC+01:00)	Zampano (yellow card) 26'; Ariaudo (yellow card) 48'; Maiello (yellow card) 68'; Pinamonti 89'	Report	Benassi 47'	Stadium: Stadio Benito Stirpe; Attendance: 13,378; Referee: Fabrizio Pasqua

24 November 2018 13	Internazionale	3–0	Frosinone	Milan
20:30 CET (UTC+01:00)	Keita 10', 82'; Asamoah (yellow card) 14'; Martínez 57'	Report	Crisetig (yellow card) 6'; Beghetto (yellow card) 40'; Cassata (yellow card) 44'	Stadium: San Siro; Attendance: 63,645; Referee: Luca Pairetto

2 December 2018 14	Frosinone	1–1	Cagliari	Frosinone
15:00 CET (UTC+01:00)	Cassata 14', (yellow card) 32'	Report	Ceppetelli (yellow card) 34'; Bradarić (yellow card) 37'; Srna (yellow card) 40'; Barella (yellow card) 54' (yellow-red card) 85'; Pavoletti (yellow card) 60'; Farias 77', (yellow card) 90+2'	Stadium: Stadio Benito Stirpe; Attendance: 12,377; Referee: Marco Serra

8 December 2018 15	Napoli	4–0	Frosinone	Naples
15:00 CET (UTC+01:00)	Zieliński 7', (yellow card) 33'; Ounas 40'; Milik 68', 84'	Report	Cassata (yellow card) 64'; Campbell (yellow card) 90'	Stadium: Stadio San Paolo; Attendance: 34,631; Referee: Gianluca Manganiello

16 December 2018 16	Frosinone	0–2	Sassuolo	Frosinone
15:00 CET (UTC+01:00)	Chibsah (yellow card) 23'; Ciano (yellow card) 57'; Soddimo (yellow card) 90+4'	Report	Rogério (yellow card) 34'; Ariaudo 44' (o.g.); Sensi (yellow card) 47'; Berardi 58'	Stadium: Stadio Benito Stirpe; Attendance: 12,377; Referee: Eugenio Abbattista

22 December 2018 17	Udinese	1–1	Frosinone	Udine
15:00 CET (UTC+01:00)	Mandragora 32'; Behrami (yellow card) 73'; D'Alessandro (yellow card) 83'	Report	Cassata (yellow card) 6'; Krajnc (yellow card) 8'; Ciano 61' (pen.); Chibsah (yellow card) 75'; Sportiello (yellow card) 78'	Stadium: Dacia Arena; Attendance: 15,954; Referee: Paolo Valeri

26 December 2018 18	Frosinone	0–0	Milan	Frosinone
12:30 CET (UTC+01:00)	Ghiglione (yellow card) 41'; Crisetig (yellow card) 54'	Report	Donnarumma (yellow card) 40'	Stadium: Stadio Benito Stirpe; Attendance: 15,217; Referee: Marco Guida

29 December 2018 19	Chievo	1–0	Frosinone	Verona
15:00 CET (UTC+01:00)	Pellissier (yellow card) 46'; Giaccherini (yellow card) 51', (goal) 76'; Bani (yellow card) 64'; Radovanović (yellow card) 68'	Report	Crisetig (yellow card) 10'; Pinamonti (yellow card) 49'; Capuano (yellow card) 58' (yellow-red card) 58'; Ciano (yellow card) 69'; Beghetto (yellow card) 75'	Stadium: Stadio Marc'Antonio Bentegodi; Attendance: 10,000; Referee: Gianluca Rocchi

20 January 2019 20	Frosinone	0–5	Atalanta	Frosinone
12:30 CET (UTC+01:00)	Ghiglione (yellow card) 88'; Matarese (yellow card) 90+1'	Report	Mancini 11'; Zapata 44', 47', 64', 73'	Stadium: Stadio Benito Stirpe; Attendance: 12,728; Referee: Daniele Chiffi

27 January 2019 21	Bologna	0–4	Frosinone	Bologna
15:00 CET (UTC+01:00)	Poli (yellow card) 12'; Mattiello (red card) 13'; Sansone (yellow card) 54'; Helander (yellow card) 74'	Report	Capuano (yellow card) 5'; Ghiglione 18'; Ciano 21', 75'; Salamon (yellow card) 32'; Pinamonti 52'; Cassata (yellow card) 64'; Gori (yellow card) 81'	Stadium: Stadio Renato Dall'Ara; Attendance: 16,076; Referee: Luca Banti

4 February 2019 22	Frosinone	0–1	Lazio	Frosinone
19:00 CET (UTC+01:00)	Ciano (yellow card) 66'	Report	Parolo (yellow card) 29'; Caicedo 36', (yellow card) 44'; Lucas (yellow card) 61'; Strakosha (yellow card) 80'; Durmisi (yellow card) 90+3'	Stadium: Stadio Benito Stirpe; Attendance: 13,221; Referee: Michael Fabbri

10 February 2019 23	Sampdoria	0–1	Frosinone	Genoa
15:00 CET (UTC+01:00)	Tavares (yellow card) 35'; Gabbiadini (yellow card) 55'; Linetty (yellow card) 77'	Report	Ciofani 25'; Cassata (yellow card) 30'; Ciano (yellow card) 45'; Sportiello (yellow card) 90'	Stadium: Stadio Luigi Ferraris; Attendance: 18,937; Referee: Livio Marinelli

15 February 2019 24	Juventus	3–0	Frosinone	Turin
20:30 CET (UTC+01:00)	Dybala 6'; Bonucci 17'; Can (yellow card) 27'; Ronaldo 63'; Cancelo (yellow card) 89'	Report	Salamon (yellow card) 37'; Capuano (yellow card) 62'; Cassata (yellow card) 81'	Stadium: Allianz Stadium; Attendance: 37,294; Referee: Antonio Giua

23 February 2019 25	Frosinone	2–3	Roma	Frosinone
20:30 CET (UTC+01:00)	Ciano 5'; Goldaniga (yellow card) 68'; Cassata (yellow card) 78'; Pinamonti 80'	Report	Džeko 30', 90+5', (yellow card) 42'; Lo. Pellegrini 31'; El Shaarawy (yellow card) 39'	Stadium: Stadio Benito Stirpe; Attendance: 14,057; Referee: Gianluca Manganiello

3 March 2019 26	Genoa	0–0	Frosinone	Genoa
15:00 CET (UTC+01:00)	Zukanović (yellow card) 36'; Kouamé (yellow card) 74'	Report	Cassata (yellow card) 21', (red card) 34'; Viviani (yellow card) 25'; Ciofani (yellow card) 82'	Stadium: Stadio Luigi Ferraris; Attendance: 19,920; Referee: Maurizio Mariani

10 March 2019 27	Frosinone	1–2	Torino	Frosinone
15:00 CET (UTC+01:00)	Capuano (yellow card) 22'; Paganini 42'; Ciano (yellow card) 71'	Report	Rincón (yellow card) 30'; Meïté (yellow card) 37'; Belotti 56', 78'; Zaza (yellow card) 82'; Aina (yellow card) 85'	Stadium: Stadio Benito Stirpe; Attendance: 13,895; Referee: Piero Giacomelli

17 March 2019 28	Empoli	2–1	Frosinone	Empoli
15:00 CET (UTC+01:00)	Caputo 20' (pen.); Pajač 38'; Pasqual (yellow card) 78'; Drągowski (yellow card) 90+4'; Acquah (yellow card) 90+5'; Silvestre (yellow card) 90+6'	Report	Valzania (yellow card) 68', (goal) 70'; Goldaniga (yellow card) 75'	Stadium: Stadio Carlo Castellani; Attendance: 7,828; Referee: Davide Massa

31 March 2019 29	Frosinone	0–1	SPAL	Frosinone
15:00 CEST (UTC+02:00)	Valzania (yellow card) 21'; Salamon (yellow card) 84'; Dionisi (yellow card) 89'	Report	Vicari 13'; Cionek (yellow card) 46'; Kurtić (yellow card) 60'; Valoti (yellow card) 74'	Stadium: Stadio Benito Stirpe; Attendance: 12,969; Referee: Marco Di Bello

3 April 2019 30	Frosinone	3–2	Parma	Frosinone
21:00 CEST (UTC+02:00)	Pinamonti 13'; Brighenti (yellow card) 25'; Valzania (yellow card) 27', (goal) 45+2'; Capuano (yellow card) 44'; Ciofani 90+13' (pen.)	Report	Sierralta (yellow card) 12'; Barillà 18'; Gazzola (yellow card) 41'; Ceravolo 58' (pen.), (yellow card) 59'; Gobbi (yellow card) 90+4'	Stadium: Stadio Benito Stirpe; Attendance: 12,285; Referee: Gianluca Manganiello

7 April 2019 31	Fiorentina	0–1	Frosinone	Florence
12:30 CEST (UTC+02:00)	Dabo (yellow card) 90+1'	Report	Beghetto (yellow card) 41'; Paganini (yellow card) 59'; Capuano (yellow card) 71'; Ciofani 84'; Goldaniga (yellow card) 90'	Stadium: Stadio Artemio Franchi; Attendance: 26,958; Referee: Daniele Chiffi

14 April 2019 32	Frosinone	1–3	Internazionale	Frosinone
20:30 CEST (UTC+02:00)	Paganini (yellow card) 31'; Chibsah (yellow card) 35'; Cassata 61'; Ciano (yellow card) 83'	Report	Nainggolan 19'; Perišić 37' (pen.); Vecino (yellow card) 48', (goal) 90+3'	Stadium: Stadio Benito Stirpe; Referee: Davide Massa

20 April 2019 33	Cagliari	1–0	Frosinone	Cagliari
15:00 CEST (UTC+02:00)	João Pedro 27' (pen.), (yellow card) 82'; Faragò (yellow card) 57' (yellow-red card) 79'	Report	Ciano (yellow card) 90+2'	Stadium: Sardegna Arena; Attendance: 16,095; Referee: Rosario Abisso

28 April 2019 34	Frosinone	0–2	Napoli	Frosinone
12:30 CEST (UTC+02:00)	Ghiglione (yellow card) 45'; Gori (yellow card) 80'; Dionisi (yellow card) 81'	Report	Mertens 19'; Younes 49'; Fabián (yellow card) 79'	Stadium: Stadio Benito Stirpe; Attendance: 13,600; Referee: Federico La Penna

5 May 2019 35	Sassuolo	2–2	Frosinone	Reggio Emilia
15:00 CEST (UTC+02:00)	Bourabia (yellow card) 57'; Ferrari 66'; Boga 78'; Locatelli (yellow card) 80'	Report	Sammarco 8', (yellow card) 23'; Paganini 36'; Brighenti (yellow card) 44'; Sportiello (yellow card) 87'	Stadium: Mapei Stadium – Città del Tricolore; Attendance: 10,073; Referee: Antonio Giua

12 May 2019 36	Frosinone	1–3	Udinese	Frosinone
15:00 CEST (UTC+02:00)	Ariaudo (yellow card) 41'; Ciano (yellow card) 52'; Dionisi 85'	Report	Okaka 11', 45', (yellow card) 31'; Samir 41', (yellow card) 90'; Sandro (yellow card) 54'	Stadium: Stadio Benito Stirpe; Attendance: 12,261; Referee: Fabrizio Pasqua

19 May 2019 37	Milan	2–0	Frosinone	Milan
18:00 CEST (UTC+02:00)	Abate (yellow card) 49'; Piątek 57'; Suso 66'	Report		Stadium: San Siro; Attendance: 61,765; Referee: Gianluca Manganiello

25 May 2019 38	Frosinone	0–0	Chievo	Frosinone
18:00 CEST (UTC+02:00)	Valzania (yellow card) 33'; Ciano (yellow card) 52'	Report	Depaoli (yellow card) 36'; Rigoni (yellow card) 90'	Stadium: Stadio Benito Stirpe; Attendance: 12,167; Referee: Antonio Di Martino

=== Coppa Italia ===
12 August 2018 Third round	Frosinone	0–2	Südtirol	Benevento
20:30 CEST (UTC+02:00)	Ghiglione (yellow card) 28'; Maiello (yellow card) 43'; Terranova (yellow card) 75'	Report	Morosini (yellow card) 25'; Costantino 40'; Ierardi (yellow card) 45'; Turchetta 88'	Stadium: Stadio Ciro Vigorito; Attendance: 0 Referee: Fabio Maresca
Note: Match played behind closed doors.

== Statistics ==
=== Appearances and goals ===
No.	Pos	Nat	Player	Total		Serie A		Coppa Italia	
No.	Pos	Nat	Player	Apps	Goals	Apps	Goals	Apps	Goals
Goalkeepers
22	GK	(Italy) ITA	Francesco Bardi	0	0	0	0	0	0
57	GK	(Italy) ITA	Marco Sportiello	32	0	31	0	1	0
91	GK	(Italy) ITA	Alessandro Iacobucci	0	0	0	0	0	0
Defenders
2	DF	(Italy) ITA	Paolo Ghiglione	9	1	5+3	1	1	0
3	DF	(Italy) ITA	Cristian Molinaro	15	0	13+1	0	1	0
4	DF	(Czech Republic) CZE	Stefan Simić	0	0	0	0	0	0
6	DF	(Italy) ITA	Edoardo Goldaniga	25	1	24	1	1	0
15	DF	(Italy) ITA	Lorenzo Ariaudo	12	0	12	0	0	0
17	DF	(Italy) ITA	Francesco Zampano	23	0	21+2	0	0	0
23	DF	(Italy) ITA	Nicolò Brighenti	6	0	6	0	0	0
25	DF	(Italy) ITA	Marco Capuano	23	0	23	0	0	0
27	DF	(Poland) POL	Bartosz Salamon	21	0	19+1	0	1	0
32	DF	(Slovenia) SVN	Luka Krajnc	9	0	9	0	0	0
Midfielders
5	MF	(Italy) ITA	Mirko Gori	9	0	1+8	0	0	0
8	MF	(Italy) ITA	Raffaele Maiello	24	0	19+4	0	1	0
16	MF	(Italy) ITA	Luca Valzania	6	2	5+1	2	0	0
21	MF	(Italy) ITA	Paolo Sammarco	5	0	2+2	0	0+1	0
24	MF	(Italy) ITA	Francesco Cassata	17	1	12+5	1	0	0
33	MF	(Italy) ITA	Andrea Beghetto	20	0	18+2	0	0	0
66	MF	(Ghana) GHA	Raman Chibsah	31	1	29+1	1	1	0
92	MF	(Italy) ITA	Federico Viviani	5	0	5	0	0	0
Forwards
7	FW	(Italy) ITA	Luca Paganini	7	1	6+1	1	0	0
9	FW	(Italy) ITA	Daniel Ciofani	25	5	14+11	5	0	0
18	FW	(Italy) ITA	Federico Dionisi	3	0	0+2	0	1	0
20	FW	(Italy) ITA	Marcello Trotta	8	0	2+6	0	0	0
28	FW	(Italy) ITA	Camillo Ciano	28	7	23+4	7	0+1	0
89	FW	(Italy) ITA	Andrea Pinamonti	22	5	13+9	5	0	0
Players transferred out during the season
4	MF	(Netherlands) NED	Rai Vloet	5	0	1+4	0	0	0
10	MF	(Italy) ITA	Danilo Soddimo	10	0	1+9	0	0	0
11	FW	(Croatia) CRO	Stipe Perica	8	0	6+1	0	1	0
19	FW	(Italy) ITA	Luca Matarese	3	0	0+2	0	0+1	0
20	MF	(Iceland) ISL	Emil Hallfreðsson	7	0	5+1	0	1	0
26	DF	(Italy) ITA	Emanuele Terranova	1	0	0	0	1	0
29	FW	(Costa Rica) CRC	Joel Campbell	17	0	11+6	0	0	0
31	MF	(Ghana) GHA	Emmanuel Besea	0	0	0	0	0	0
88	MF	(Italy) ITA	Lorenzo Crisetig	8	0	5+3	0	0	0
99	FW	(Uruguay) URU	Joaquín Ardaiz	1	0	0+1	0	0	0

Last updated: 10 April 2019
Source: Competitions

=== Goalscorers ===
Rank	No.	Pos	Nat	Name	Serie A	Coppa Italia	Total
1	28	FW	(Italy)	Camillo Ciano	4	0	4
2	9	FW	(Italy)	Daniel Ciofani	2	0	2
2	89	FW	(Italy)	Andrea Pinamonti	2	0	2
4	6	DF	(Italy)	Edoardo Goldaniga	1	0	1
4	24	MF	(Italy)	Francesco Cassata	1	0	1
4	66	MF	(Ghana)	Raman Chibsah	1	0	1
Own goal					1	0	1
Totals					12	0	12

Last updated: 20 January 2019

=== Clean sheets ===
Rank	No.	Pos	Nat	Name	Serie A	Coppa Italia	Total
1	57	GK	(Italy)	Marco Sportiello	4	0	4
Totals					4	0	4

Last updated: 20 January 2019

=== Disciplinary record ===
No.	Pos	Nat	Name	Serie A			Coppa Italia			Total		
No.	Pos	Nat	Name	Booked	(yellow card) (yellow-red card)	Sent off (straight red)	Booked	(yellow card) (yellow-red card)	Sent off (straight red)	Booked	(yellow card) (yellow-red card)	Sent off (straight red)
57	GK	(Italy)	Marco Sportiello	3	0	0	0	0	0	3	0	0
2	DF	(Italy)	Paolo Ghiglione	3	0	0	1	0	0	4	0	0
3	DF	(Italy)	Cristian Molinaro	2	0	0	0	0	0	2	0	0
6	DF	(Italy)	Edoardo Goldaniga	3	0	0	0	0	0	3	0	0
15	DF	(Italy)	Lorenzo Ariaudo	1	0	0	0	0	0	1	0	0
17	DF	(Italy)	Francesco Zampano	1	0	0	0	0	0	1	0	0
23	DF	(Italy)	Nicolò Brighenti	2	0	0	0	0	0	2	0	0
25	DF	(Italy)	Marco Capuano	0	1	0	0	0	0	0	1	0
26	DF	(Italy)	Emanuele Terranova	0	0	0	1	0	0	1	0	0
32	DF	(Slovenia)	Luka Krajnc	3	0	0	0	0	0	3	0	0
5	MF	(Italy)	Mirko Gori	1	0	0	0	0	0	1	0	0
8	MF	(Italy)	Raffaele Maiello	4	0	0	1	0	0	5	0	0
10	MF	(Italy)	Danilo Soddimo	2	0	0	0	0	0	2	0	0
20	MF	(Iceland)	Emil Hallfreðsson	2	0	0	0	0	0	2	0	0
24	MF	(Italy)	Francesco Cassata	4	0	0	0	0	0	4	0	0
33	MF	(Italy)	Andrea Beghetto	2	0	0	0	0	0	2	0	0
66	MF	(Ghana)	Raman Chibsah	4	0	0	0	0	0	4	0	0
88	MF	(Italy)	Lorenzo Crisetig	3	0	0	0	0	0	3	0	0
11	FW	(Croatia)	Stipe Perica	3	0	0	0	0	0	3	0	0
19	FW	(Italy)	Luca Materese	1	0	0	0	0	0	1	0	0
28	FW	(Italy)	Camillo Ciano	5	0	0	0	0	0	5	0	0
29	FW	(Costa Rica)	Joel Campbell	4	0	0	0	0	0	4	0	0
89	FW	(Italy)	Andrea Pinamonti	2	0	0	0	0	0	2	0	0
Totals				55	1	0	3	0	0	58	1	0

Last updated: 20 January 2019
