= 2021–22 Frosinone Calcio season =

Frosinone
2021–22 season
- Chairman: Maurizio Stirpe
- Manager: Fabio Grosso
- Stadium: Stadio Benito Stirpe
- Serie B: 9th
- Coppa Italia: First round
- Top goalscorer: League: Gabriel Charpentier (10); All: Gabriel Charpentier (10)

The 2021–22 season was Frosinone Calcio's third consecutive season in second division of the Italian football league, the Serie B, and the 116th as a football club.

== Players ==
=== First-team quad ===
As of 31 January 2022

Note: Flags indicate national team as defined under FIFA eligibility rules; some limited exceptions apply. Players may hold more than one non-FIFA nationality.

No.	Pos.	Nation	Player
1	GK	ITA	Federico Ravaglia (on loan from Bologna)
3	DF	DEN	Lukas Klitten
4	DF	ALB	Sergio Kalaj
6	DF	ITA	Federico Gatti (on loan from Juventus)
7	MF	SWE	Marcus Rohdén
9	FW	FRA	Gabriel Charpentier (on loan from Genoa)
11	DF	ITA	Francesco Zampano
15	MF	ITA	Hamza Haoudi
16	DF	ITA	Luca Garritano
17	MF	ITA	Emanuele Cicerelli (on loan from Lazio)
18	FW	USA	Andrija Novakovich
19	MF	ITA	Alessio Tribuzzi
21	MF	ROU	Daniel Boloca
23	DF	ITA	Nicolò Brighenti (captain)

No.	Pos.	Nation	Player
24	MF	ITA	Alessio Zerbin (on loan from Napoli)
25	DF	POL	Przemysław Szymiński
26	MF	CRO	Karlo Lulić
27	MF	ITA	Luigi Canotto
28	FW	ITA	Camillo Ciano
29	DF	ITA	Matteo Cotali
32	DF	ITA	Salvatore D'Elia
34	MF	ITA	Andrea Tabanelli
43	DF	SRB	Milan Kremenovic
44	DF	BIH	Adrian Leon Barišić (on loan from Osijek)
78	FW	ITA	Giacomo Manzari (on loan from Sassuolo)
88	MF	ITA	Matteo Ricci
94	GK	ITA	Stefano Minelli
—	DF	GAB	Anthony Oyono

=== Other players under contract ===
Note: Flags indicate national team as defined under FIFA eligibility rules; some limited exceptions apply. Players may hold more than one non-FIFA nationality.

No.	Pos.	Nation	Player
—	GK	ITA	Giuseppe Marcianò

=== Out on loan ===
Note: Flags indicate national team as defined under FIFA eligibility rules; some limited exceptions apply. Players may hold more than one non-FIFA nationality.

No.	Pos.	Nation	Player
—	GK	ITA	Victor De Lucia (at Feralpisalò)
—	GK	ITA	Thomas Vettorel (at Carrarese)
—	DF	ITA	Federico Bevilacqua (at Carrarese)
—	DF	SLO	Luka Koblar (at Potenza )
—	DF	ITA	Mattia Tonetto (at Monterosi)
—	MF	ITA	Andrea Errico (at Monterosi)
—	MF	ITA	Mirko Gori (at Alessandria)

No.	Pos.	Nation	Player
—	MF	ITA	Raffaele Maiello (at Bari)
—	FW	ITA	Pietro Iemmello (at Catanzaro)
—	FW	ITA	Pierluca Luciani (at Monterosi)
—	FW	ITA	Luca Matarese (at Imolese)
—	FW	POL	Piotr Parzyszek (at Pogoń Szczecin)
—	FW	MLT	Alexander Satariano (at Pergolettese)
—	FW	ITA	Michele Volpe (at Vibonese)

== Pre-season and friendlies ==
Win Draw Loss

24 July 2021 Friendly	Frosinone (Italy)	11–0	(Italy) Alatri	Fiuggi, Italy
17:00 CEST (UTC+2)				Stadium: Stadio Comunale

28 July 2021 Friendly	Frosinone (Italy)	1–2	(Italy) Viterbese	Fiuggi, Italy
17:00 CEST (UTC+2)				Stadium: Stadio Comunale

31 July 2021 Friendly	Frosinone (Italy)	2–0	(Italy) Ternana	Frosinone, Italy
17:00 CEST (UTC+2)				Stadium: Stadio Benito Stirpe

7 August 2021 Friendly	Frosinone (Italy)	2–2	(Italy) Benevento	Frosinone, Italy
19:00 CEST (UTC+2)				Stadium: Stadio Benito Stirpe

== Competitions ==
=== Overall record ===
Competition	First match	Last match	Starting round	Final position	Record							
Competition	First match	Last match	Starting round	Final position	Pld	W	D	L	GF	GA	GD	Win %
Serie B	20 August 2021	6 May 2022	Matchday 1	9th	38	15	13	10	58	45	+13	39.47
Coppa Italia	15 August 2021		First round	First round	1	0	1	0	1	1	+0	0.00
Total					39	15	14	10	59	46	+13	38.46

Last updated: 6 May 2022
Source: Soccerway

=== Serie B ===
==== League table ====
Pos	Team	Pld	W	D	L	GF	GA	GD	Pts	Promotion, qualification or relegation
7	Benevento	38	18	9	11	62	39	+23	63	Qualification for promotion play-offs preliminary round
8	Perugia	38	14	16	8	40	32	+8	58 (Note: Perugia finished ahead of Frosinone on head-to-head points: Frosinone 0–0 Perugia, Perugia 3–0 Frosinone.)	Qualification for promotion play-offs preliminary round
9	Frosinone	38	15	13	10	58	45	+13	58	
10	Ternana	38	15	9	14	58	61	−3	54	
11	Cittadella	38	13	13	12	38	36	+2	52	

Source: Lega Serie B (in Italian), Soccerway (in English)
Rules for classification: 1) Points; 2) Head-to-head points; 3) Head-to-head goal difference; 4) Goal difference; 5) Goals scored; 6) Draw.

==== Results summary ====
Overall								Home						Away					
Pld	W	D	L	GF	GA	GD	Pts	W	D	L	GF	GA	GD	W	D	L	GF	GA	GD
38	15	13	10	58	45	+13	58	10	6	3	34	16	+18	5	7	7	24	29	−5

Last updated: 6 May 2022.
Source: Serie B

==== Results by round ====
Round	1	2	3	4	5	6	7	8	9	10	11	12	13	14	15	16	17	18	19	20	21	22	23	24	25	26	27	28	29	30	31	32	33	34	35	36	37	38
Ground	H	A	H	A	H	A	H	A	H	A	H	A	H	H	A	H	A	H	A	A	H	A	H	A	H	A	H	A	H	A	H	A	A	H	A	H	A	H
Result	D	W	D	W	D	D	L	D	W	D	W	W	D	D	D	D	L	W	W	W	W	L	L	D	W	L	W	D	W	L	W	L	L	W	D	W	L	L
Position	10	5	7	6	5	7	8	10	7	7	6	5	4	4	7	8	10	8	7	7	5	7	6	8	8	8	7	7	7	8	6	8	8	8	8	8	8	9

Updated to match(es) played on 6 May 2022. Source: Serie B
A = Away; H = Home; W = Win; D = Draw; L = Loss

==== Matches ====
The league fixtures were announced on 24 July 2021.

=== Coppa Italia ===
15 August 2021 First round	Venezia	1–1 (a.e.t.) (8–7 p)	Frosinone	Ferrara
20:45 CEST (UTC+2)	Fiordilino (yellow card) 67'; Di Mariano 101' (pen.)	Report	Rohdén (yellow card) 60'; Gori 93'; Brighenti (yellow card) 108'	Stadium: Stadio Paolo Mazza; Attendance: 250; Referee: Alessandro Prontrera
	Penalties
	Sigurðsson (penalty scored); Heymans (penalty scored); Di Mariano (penalty scored); Tessmann (penalty missed); Vacca (penalty scored); Ceccaroni (penalty scored); Johnses (penalty scored); Caldara (penalty scored); Ebuehi (penalty scored)		(penalty scored) Ciano; (penalty missed) Maiello; (penalty scored) Zampano; (penalty scored) Iemmello; (penalty scored) Vitale; (penalty scored) Brighenti; (penalty scored) Szymiński; (penalty scored) Zerbin; (penalty missed) Gatti
