= Raffaele Maiello =

Italian footballer

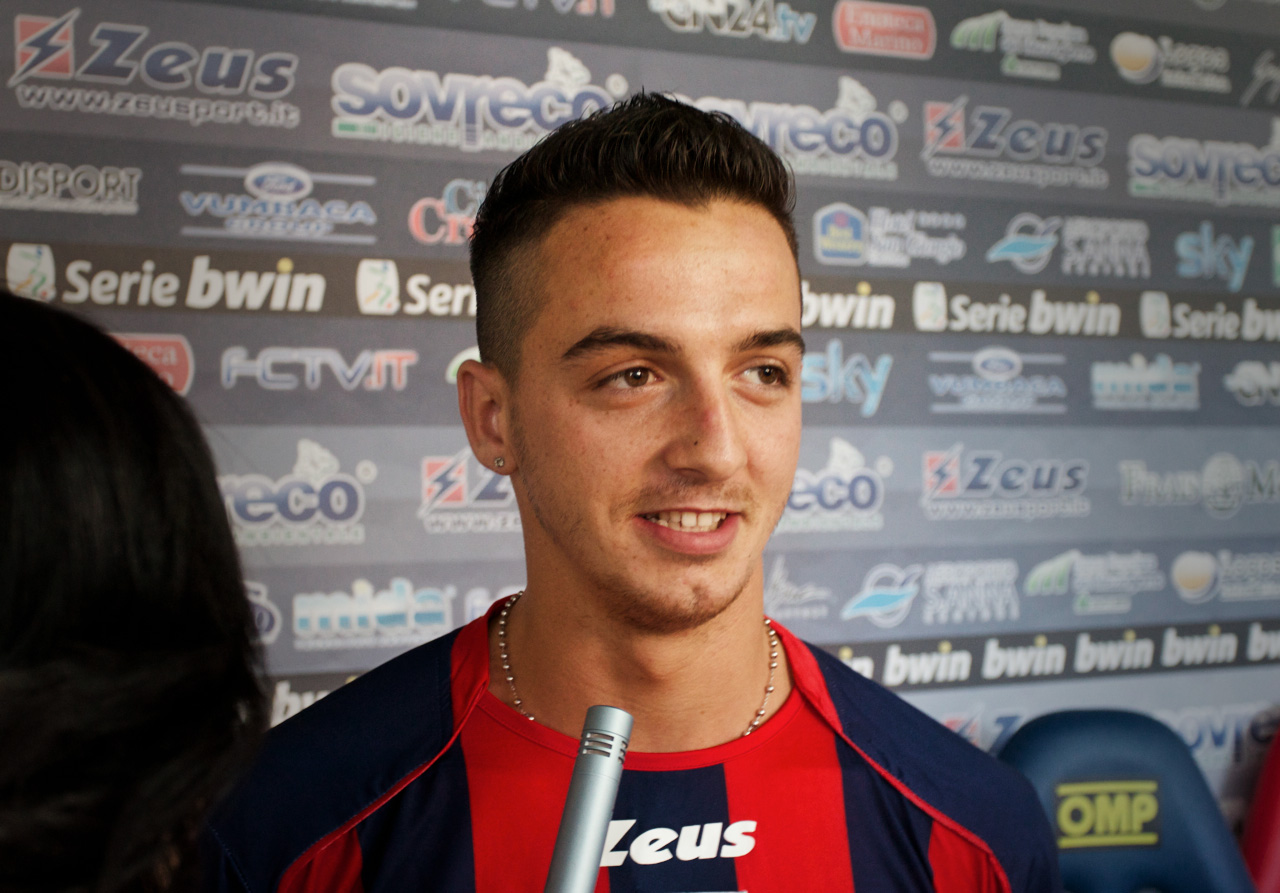

Personal information
- Date of birth: 10 July 1991 (age 35)
- Place of birth: Acerra, Italy
- Height: 1.77 m (5 ft 10 in)
- Position: Midfielder

Team information
- Current team: Casarano
- Number: 17

Senior career*
Years	Team	Apps	(Gls)
2010–2015	Napoli	4	(0)
2011–2013	→ Crotone (loan)	62	(5)
2013–2014	→ Ternana (loan)	30	(2)
2014–2015	→ Crotone (loan)	38	(3)
2015	Crotone	0	(0)
2015–2017	Napoli	0	(0)
2015–2017	→ Empoli (loan)	13	(0)
2017	→ Frosinone (loan)	20	(0)
2017–2022	Frosinone	145	(6)
2022	→ Bari (loan)	15	(0)
2022–2025	Bari	57	(1)
2025–	Casarano	25	(1)

International career
2010	Italy U-19	1	(0)
2011	Italy U-20	1	(0)
2011–2012	Italy U-21 Serie B	5	(1)
- * Club domestic league appearances and goals as of 1 May 2026

Raffaele Maiello (born 10 July 1991) is an Italian professional footballer who plays as a midfielder for Serie C Group C club Casarano.

== Club career ==
He made his Serie A debut for Napoli on 16 May 2010 in a game against Sampdoria when he came on as a substitute in the 86th minute for Luca Cigarini.

On 29 January 2022, he joined Bari in Serie C on loan, with Bari holding an obligation to purchase his rights in case of promotion to Serie B.

== Career statistics ==
As of match played on 2 June 2023

Appearances and goals by club, season and competition
Club	Season	League			National Cup		Continental		Other		Total	
Club	Season	Division	Apps	Goals	Apps	Goals	Apps	Goals	Apps	Goals	Apps	Goals
Napoli	2009–10	Serie A	1	0	0	0	—		—		1	0
Napoli	2010–11	Serie A	3	0	0	0	0	0	—		3	0
Napoli	Total		4	0	0	0	0	0	0	0	4	0
Crotone (loan)	2011–12	Serie B	26	0	3	0	—		—		29	0
Crotone (loan)	2012–13	Serie B	36	5	1	0	—		—		37	5
Crotone (loan)	Total		62	5	4	0	0	0	0	0	66	5
Ternana (loan)	2013–14	Serie B	30	2	1	0	—		—		31	2
Crotone (loan)	2014–15	Serie B	38	3	0	0	—		—		38	3
Empoli (loan)	2015–16	Serie A	12	0	0	0	—		—		12	0
Empoli (loan)	2016–17	Serie A	1	0	2	0	—		—		3	0
Empoli (loan)	Total		13	0	2	0	0	0	0	0	15	0
Frosinone (loan)	2016–17	Serie B	20	0	0	0	—		2 (Note: Appearance(s) in Promotion Playoffs)	0	22	0
Frosinone	2017–18	Serie B	36	2	0	0	—		2	1	38	3
Frosinone	2018–19	Serie A	29	0	1	0	—		—		30	0
Frosinone	2019–20	Serie B	34	1	2	0	—		5	0	41	1
Frosinone	2020–21	Serie B	33	2	1	0	—		—		34	2
Frosinone	2021–22	Serie B	13	1	1	0	—		—		14	1
Frosinone	Total		145	6	5	0	0	0	7	1	157	7
Bari (loan)	2021–22	Serie C	15	0	—		—		2 (Note: Appearances in the Supercoppa di Serie C)	0	17	0
Bari	2022–23	Serie B	28	0	2	0	—		2	0	32	0
Career total			355	16	14	0	0	0	13	1	382	17

== Honours ==
Bari

- Serie C: 2021–22 (Group C)
