= Andrija Novakovich =

American soccer player (born 1996)

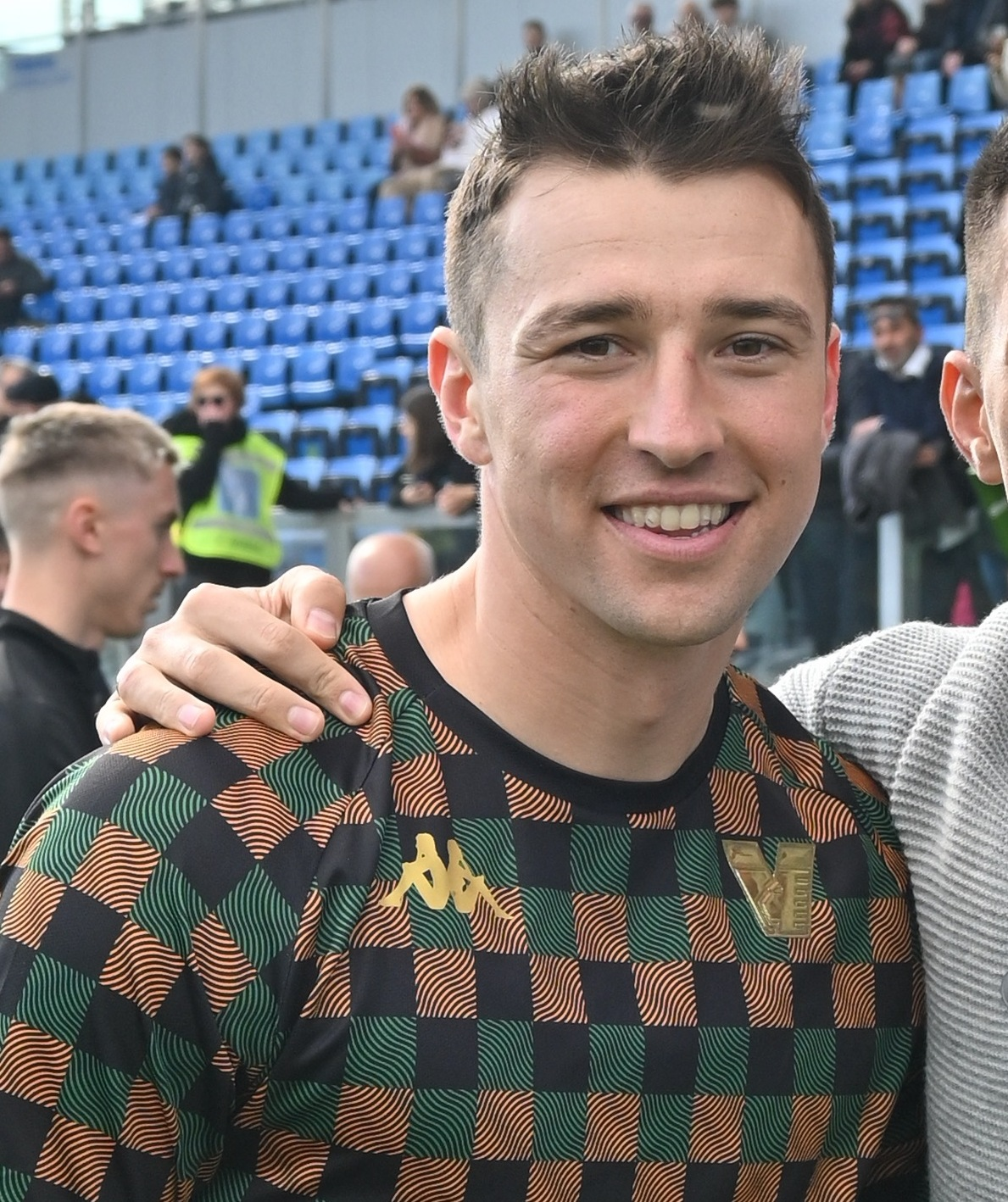
- Novakovich in 2023.

Personal information
- Full name: Andrija Novakovich
- Date of birth: September 21, 1996 (age 30)
- Place of birth: Muskego, Wisconsin, United States
- Height: 1.93 m (6 ft 4 in)
- Position: Forward

Team information
- Current team: Maccabi Haifa
- Number: 9

Youth career
- 2004–2006: United Serbians
- 2012–2014: Chicago Magic PSG
- 2014–2015: Reading

Senior career*
| Years | Team | Apps | (Gls) |
| 2015–2019 | Reading | 3 | (0) |
| 2015–2016 | → Cheltenham Town (loan) | 4 | (0) |
| 2017–2018 | → Telstar (loan) | 35 | (19) |
| 2018–2019 | → Fortuna Sittard (loan) | 29 | (9) |
| 2019–2022 | Frosinone | 95 | (18) |
| 2022–2025 | Venezia | 35 | (1) |
| 2023–2024 | → Lecco (loan) | 38 | (6) |
| 2024–2025 | → Bari (loan) | 28 | (3) |
| 2025–2026 | Reggiana | 33 | (5) |
| 2026– | Maccabi Haifa | 1 | (0) |

International career^{‡}
| 2013 | United States U17 | 2 | (2) |
| 2013–2014 | United States U18 | 7 | (1) |
| 2014 | United States U20 | 5 | (3) |
| 2018 | United States | 3 | (0) |
- * Club domestic league appearances and goals as of August 22, 2026 ‡ National team caps and goals as of October 11, 2018

Andrija Novakovich (Serbian: Андрија Новаковић, romanized: Andrija Novaković; born 21 September 1996) is an American professional soccer player who plays as a forward for Israeli Premier League club Maccabi Haifa.

== Club career ==
=== Youth ===
Born and raised in Muskego, Wisconsin to Serbian parents, Novakovich spent his youth career with United Serbians, Red Star, and Chicago Magic. He was once named Gatorade Wisconsin Player of the Year after scoring 41 goals

=== Senior ===
Despite signing a letter of intent to play college soccer at Marquette University, Novakovich agreed to join English Championship side Reading in April 2014, signing for the club in June of the same year, the move being made easier due to Novakovich holding a British passport through his mother who was born in England of Serbian descent.

On November 26, 2015, Novakovich joined National League side Cheltenham Town on loan until January 2, 2016. Novakovich returned to Reading on January 4, 2016, after Cheltenham Town didn't extend his loan deal.

On July 2, 2017, Reading announced that Novakovich had signed a new two-year contract with the club, and that he would join Eerste Divisie side SC Telstar for the 2017–18 season. A year later, June 20, 2018, Novakovich signed a new two-year contract with Reading and moved to Fortuna Sittard on a season-long loan deal.

On September 2, 2019, it was announced that Novakovich would leave Reading, with Frosinone paying an undisclosed fee for the player. Novakovich signed a contract with Frosinone lasting until 30 June 2022.

On July 15, 2022, Novakovich moved to another Italian club Venezia on a four-year contract. On August 23, 2023, he was loaned to Lecco for the 2023–24 season. On July 23, 2024, Novakovich moved on a new loan to Bari, with an option to buy and a conditional obligation to buy.

On August 21, 2025, Novakovich signed a two-season contract with Reggiana.

== International career ==
In March 2018, Novakovich was called up to the USMNT for the first time for their international friendly against Paraguay on March 27, 2018. In the 77' minute, he earned his first cap replacing Bobby Wood, the goalscorer, in Cary, North Carolina at WakeMed Soccer Park. Novakovich holds both British and American passports, as his mother Zorka was born in England, and remains eligible to represent England or the United States in a competitive match, as well as Serbia, his father's birthplace.

== Career statistics ==
=== Club ===
As of match played May 1, 2023

Appearances and goals by club, season and competition
| Club | Season | League | | | National cup (Note: Includes KNVB Cup, Coppa Italia) | | Other | | Total | |
| Club | Season | Division | Apps | Goals | Apps | Goals | Apps | Goals | Apps | Goals |
|---|---|---|---|---|---|---|---|---|---|---|
| Reading | 2014–15 | Championship | 2 | 0 | 0 | 0 | – | | 2 | 0 |
| Reading | 2015–16 | Championship | 0 | 0 | 0 | 0 | – | | 0 | 0 |
| Reading | 2016–17 | Championship | 0 | 0 | 0 | 0 | – | | 0 | 0 |
| Reading | 2019–20 | Championship | 1 | 0 | 0 | 0 | – | | 1 | 0 |
| Reading | Total | | 3 | 0 | 0 | 0 | – | | 3 | 0 |
| Cheltenham Town (loan) | 2015–16 | National League | 4 | 0 | 0 | 0 | 1 | 0 | 5 | 0 |
| Telstar (loan) | 2017–18 | Eerste Divisie | 35 | 19 | 1 | 1 | 2 (Note: Appearances in Eredivisie promotion play-offs) | 2 | 38 | 22 |
| Fortuna Sittard (loan) | 2018–19 | Eredivisie | 29 | 9 | 2 | 1 | 1 | 1 | 32 | 11 |
| Frosinone | 2019–20 | Serie B | 33 | 4 | 0 | 0 | 5 (Note: Appearances in Serie B promotion play-offs) | 1 | 38 | 5 |
| Frosinone | 2020–21 | Serie B | 33 | 11 | 1 | 0 | – | | 34 | 11 |
| Frosinone | 2021–22 | Serie B | 29 | 3 | 0 | 0 | – | | 29 | 3 |
| Frosinone | Total | | 95 | 18 | 1 | 0 | 5 | 1 | 101 | 19 |
| Venezia | 2022–23 | Serie B | 33 | 1 | 1 | 0 | – | | 34 | 1 |
| Lecco (loan) | 2023–24 | Serie B | 38 | 6 | 0 | 0 | – | | 38 | 6 |
| Bari (loan) | 2024–25 | Serie B | 28 | 3 | 1 | 0 | – | | 29 | 3 |
| Reggiana | 2025–26 | Serie B | 9 | 1 | 0 | 0 | – | | 9 | 1 |
| Career total | | | 274 | 57 | 6 | 2 | 9 | 4 | 289 | 63 |

=== International ===
As of match played October 12, 2018

Appearances and goals by national team and year
| National team | Year | Apps | Goals |
|---|---|---|---|
| United States | 2018 | 3 | 0 |
| Total | | 3 | 0 |
