= Przemysław Szymiński =

Polish footballer

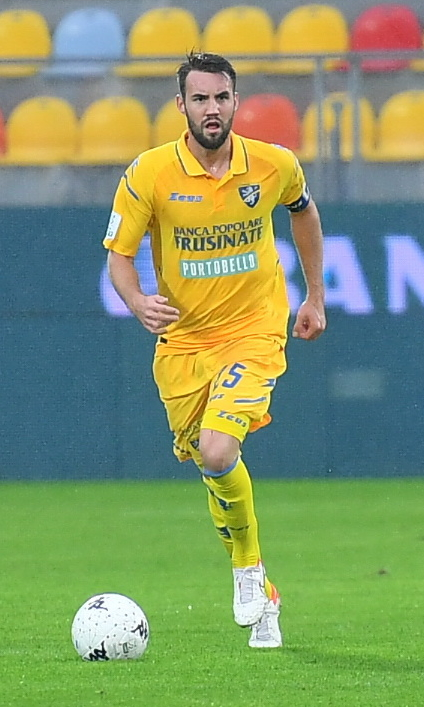
- Szymiński in 2022 with Frosinone

Personal information
- Full name: Przemysław Marek Szymiński
- Date of birth: 24 June 1994 (age 32)
- Place of birth: Katowice, Poland
- Height: 1.85 m (6 ft 1 in)
- Position: Centre-back

Senior career*
Years	Team	Apps	(Gls)
2012–2014	Rozwój Katowice	80	(3)
2014–2017	Wisła Płock	81	(3)
2017–2019	Palermo	48	(1)
2019–2025	Frosinone	89	(3)
2023–2024	→ Reggiana (loan)	21	(0)
2025–2026	Ruch Chorzów	3	(0)

International career
2016–2017	Poland U21	3	(0)
- * Club domestic league appearances and goals as of 14:41, 29 May 2026 (UTC)

Przemysław Marek Szymiński (born 24 June 1994) is a Polish professional footballer who plays as a centre-back.

== Club career ==
He joined Serie B club Palermo in August 2017.

After being released in July 2019 due to the club's exclusion from Italian football, he joined Frosinone soon afterwards. Szymiński made his Serie A debut on 26 August 2023, coming on as a substitute in a 2–1 home win against Atalanta. Five days later, he joined second division side Reggiana on a season-long loan. He returned to Frosinone at the end of the season.

On 2 July 2025, Szymiński returned to Silesia to join Polish second tier club Ruch Chorzów on a one-year contract, with an option for a further year. He made three appearances for the Silesian club before being released at the end of the 2025–26 season.

== Career statistics ==
As of match played 3 August 2025

Appearances and goals by club, season and competition
Club	Season	League			National cup (Note: Includes Polish Cup, Coppa Italia)		Europe		Total	
Club	Season	Division	Apps	Goals	Apps	Goals	Apps	Goals	Apps	Goals
Rozwój Katowice	2011–12	III liga, gr. F	10	0	—		—		10	0
Rozwój Katowice	2012–13	II liga	20	1	—		—		20	1
Rozwój Katowice	2013–14	II liga	32	1	2	0	—		34	1
Rozwój Katowice	2014–15	II liga	18	1	1	0	—		19	1
Rozwój Katowice	Total		80	3	3	0	—		83	3
Wisła Płock	2014–15	I liga	12	0	—		—		12	0
Wisła Płock	2015–16	I liga	32	0	1	0	—		33	0
Wisła Płock	2016–17	Ekstraklasa	34	3	0	0	—		34	3
Wisła Płock	2017–18	Ekstraklasa	3	0	0	0	—		3	0
Wisła Płock	Total		81	3	1	0	—		82	3
Palermo	2017–18	Serie B	28 (Note: Includes two appearances in Serie B promotion play-offs)	0	0	0	—		28	0
Palermo	2018–19	Serie B	20	1	0	0	—		20	1
Palermo	Total		48	1	0	0	—		48	1
Frosinone	2019–20	Serie B	10	0	1	0	—		11	0
Frosinone	2020–21	Serie B	30	2	1	0	—		31	2
Frosinone	2021–22	Serie B	32	0	1	0	—		33	0
Frosinone	2022–23	Serie B	15	1	1	0	—		16	1
Frosinone	2023–24	Serie A	1	0	0	0	—		1	0
Frosinone	2024–25	Serie B	1	0	0	0	—		1	0
Frosinone	Total		89	3	4	0	—		93	3
Reggiana (loan)	2023–24	Serie B	21	0	0	0	—		21	0
Ruch Chorzów	2025–26	I liga	3	0	0	0	—		3	0
Career total			322	10	8	0	0	0	330	10

== Honours ==
Rozwój Katowice

- III liga Opole–Silesia: 2011–12

Frosinone

- Serie B: 2022–23
