= Marco Sportiello =

Italian footballer (born 1992)

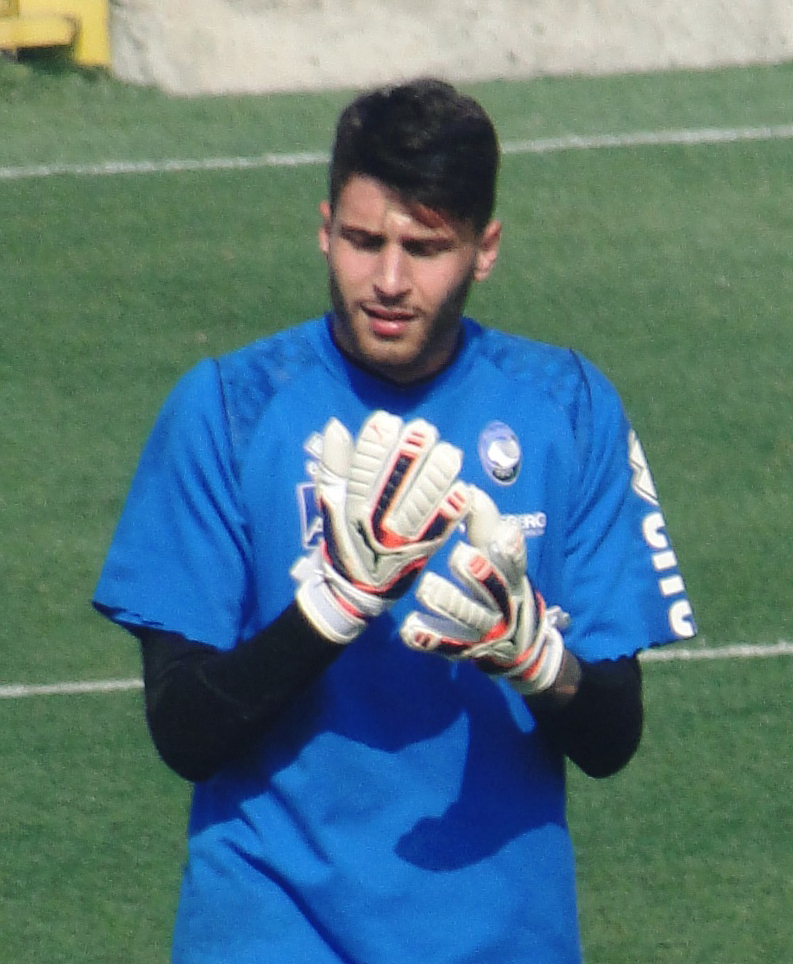
- Sportiello training with Atalanta in 2014

Personal information
- Date of birth: 10 May 1992 (age 34)
- Place of birth: Desio, Italy
- Height: 1.92 m (6 ft 4 in)
- Position: Goalkeeper

Team information
- Current team: Atalanta
- Number: 57

Youth career
- 1998–1999: Zibido San Giacomo
- 1999–2010: Atalanta

Senior career*
Years	Team	Apps	(Gls)
2010–2011	Seregno	28	(0)
2011–2012	Poggibonsi	34	(0)
2012–2013	Carpi	30	(0)
2013–2023	Atalanta	125	(0)
2017–2018	→ Fiorentina (loan)	39	(0)
2018–2019	→ Frosinone (loan)	35	(0)
2023–2025	AC Milan	9	(0)
2025–	Atalanta	1	(0)
- * Club domestic league appearances and goals as of 23:13, 22 May 2026 (UTC)

Marco Sportiello (born 10 May 1992) is an Italian professional footballer who plays as a goalkeeper for Serie A club Atalanta. He is considered a penalty saving specialist.

== Club career ==
=== Early career ===
Born in Desio, Sportiello finished his graduation with Atalanta's youth system, and subsequently moved to Seregno in a co-ownership deal. A season later, Atalanta bought the remaining half of his rights back for free.

On 20 June 2011, Sportiello joined Poggibonsi, again in a co-ownership. A year later his rights were fully assigned to La Dea. On 14 July 2012, he moved to Carpi on a season-long loan deal. After being a regular starter during the promotion campaign to Serie B, Sportiello returned to Atalanta, being third-choice (behind Andrea Consigli and Giorgio Frezzolini).

=== Atalanta ===
On 4 December 2013, Sportiello made his Atalanta debut, starting in a 2–0 home win over Sassuolo, for the season's Coppa Italia; his Serie A debut came on 12 January of the following year, starting in a 2–1 home success over Catania.

After Consigli's departure to Sassuolo, Sportiello was made starter for the 2014–15 campaign, overtaking veterans Frezzolini and new signing Vlada Avramov.

==== Loan to Fiorentina ====
On 13 January 2017, Fiorentina confirmed the signing of Sportiello from league rivals Atalanta on an 18-month loan (with an option to purchase). On 3 March 2018, the day before Fiorentina captain Davide Astori died in his sleep, Sportiello was the last person to see him alive.

==== Loan to Frosinone ====
On 6 July 2018, Sportiello signed with Frosinone on loan from Atalanta until 30 June 2019.

==== 2020–2023: Return to Atalanta and final season ====
At the end of the loan spell he returned to Atalanta. On 11 March 2020, he made his debut with the club in the Champions League, in the round of 16 against Valencia.

=== AC Milan ===
After not renewing his contract with Atalanta, Sportiello joined AC Milan as a free agent on a four-year deal on 28 June 2023. By joining Milan, Sportiello also reunited with the head coach Stefano Pioli, who was in charge of Fiorentina during the 2017–18 season, in which Sportiello was the first choice. On 19 September 2023, Sportiello stepped in for an injured Mike Maignan and made his official AC Milan debut in a Champions League group stage match against Newcastle United, which concluded in a 0–0 draw.

In October 2023, after Mike Maignan had been suspended for the home game against Juventus, Sportiello was supposed to start the game yet sustained an injury in training, which sidelined him for the rest of the 2023 calendar year.

Sportiello returned on the bench by 20 January 2024, the away Serie A game against Udinese, and made six more appearances throughout the rest of the season as Mike Maignan continued to struggle with injuries in April and May of the year. He finished the season with 9 appearances, 3 clean sheets, and 12 goals conceded.

=== Return to Atalanta ===
On 18 July 2025, Sportiello returned to Atalanta for the 2025–26 season, joining permanently from AC Milan.

== International career ==
He has been called up for the 2015 UEFA European Under-21 Championship as a reserve goalkeeper, without having made his official debut with the Italy U21 side. He has been called up for the Italy training camp on 16 May 2016.

== Career statistics ==
=== Club ===
As of match played 22 May 2026

Appearances and goals by club, season and competition
Club	Season	League			National cup		Europe		Other		Total	
Club	Season	Division	Apps	Goals	Apps	Goals	Apps	Goals	Apps	Goals	Apps	Goals
Poggibonsi	2011–12	Lega Pro 2D	34	0	—		—		—		34	0
Carpi	2012–13	Lega Pro 1D	30	0	3	0	—		4	0	37	0
Atalanta	2013–14	Serie A	3	0	1	0	—		—		4	0
Atalanta	2014–15	Serie A	37	0	0	0	—		—		37	0
Atalanta	2015–16	Serie A	36	0	1	0	—		—		37	0
Atalanta	2016–17	Serie A	8	0	2	0	—		—		10	0
Atalanta	2019–20	Serie A	6	0	0	0	2 (Note: Appearances in UEFA Champions League)	0	—		8	0
Atalanta	2020–21	Serie A	15	0	1	0	5	0	—		21	0
Atalanta	2021–22	Serie A	5	0	0	0	0	0	—		5	0
Atalanta	2022–23	Serie A	15	0	0	0	—		—		15	0
Atalanta	Total		125	0	5	0	7	0	—		137	0
Fiorentina (loan)	2016–17	Serie A	2	0	0	0	—		—		2	0
Fiorentina (loan)	2017–18	Serie A	37	0	0	0	—		—		37	0
Fiorentina (loan)	Total		39	0	0	0	—		—		39	0
Frosinone (loan)	2018–19	Serie A	35	0	1	0	—		—		36	0
AC Milan	2023–24	Serie A	7	0	0	0	2 (Note: One appearance in UEFA Champions League, one appearance in UEFA Europa League)	0	—		9	0
AC Milan	2024–25	Serie A	2	0	1	0	0	0	—		3	0
AC Milan	Total		9	0	1	0	2	0	—		12	0
Atalanta	2025–26	Serie A	1	0	1	0	2	0	—		4	0
Career total			273	0	11	0	11	0	4	0	299	0

== Honours ==
AC Milan

- Supercoppa Italiana: 2024–25
