= Marcus Rohdén =

Swedish footballer

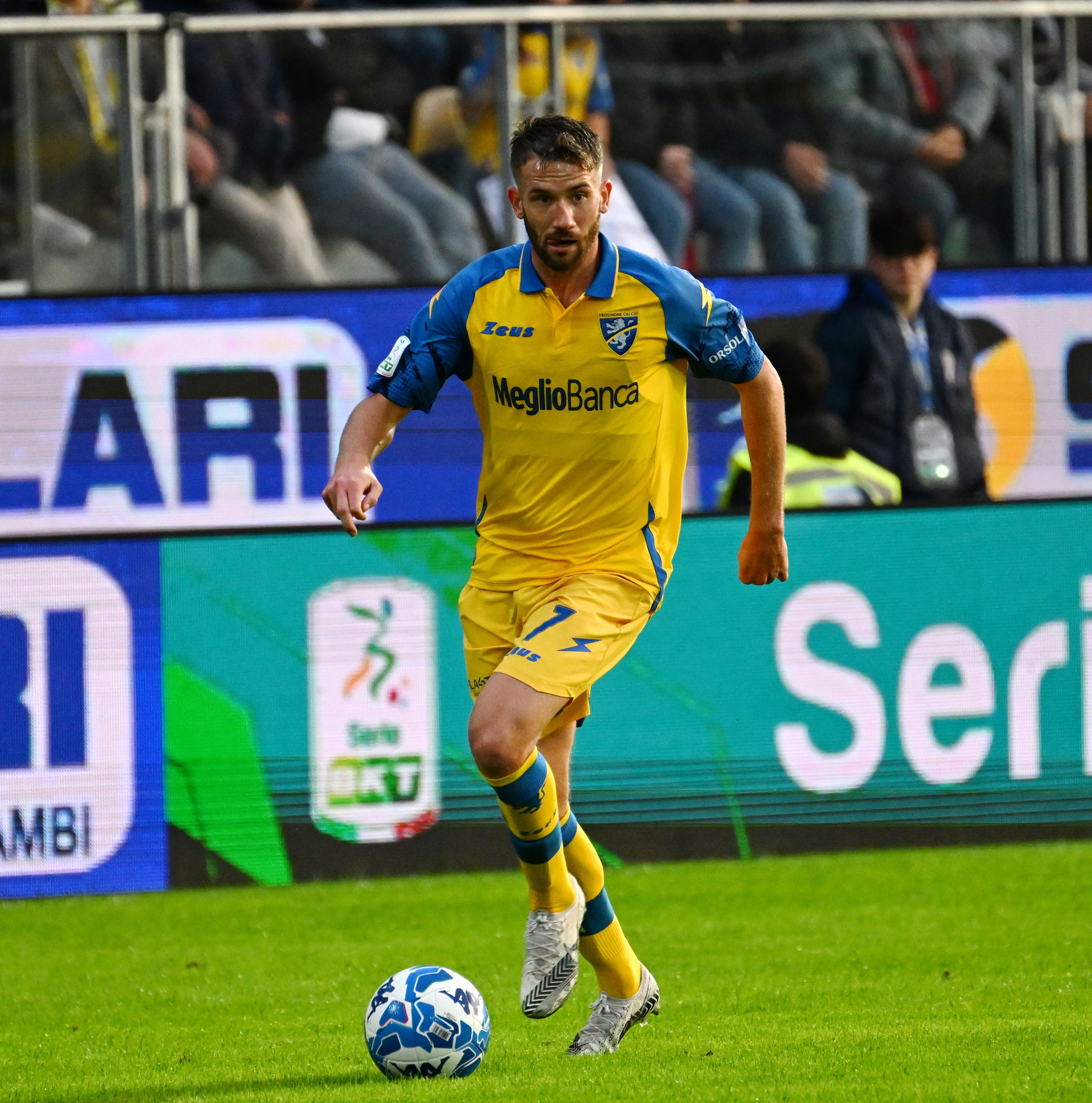
- Rohdén with Frosinone in 2022

Personal information
- Full name: Marcus Christer Rohdén
- Date of birth: 11 May 1991 (age 35)
- Place of birth: Knätte (near Ulricehamn), Sweden
- Height: 1.82 m (6 ft 0 in)
- Position: Midfielder

Team information
- Current team: IF Elfsborg
- Number: 7

Youth career
- –2007: Hössna IF
- 2007–2011: IF Elfsborg

Senior career*
Years	Team	Apps	(Gls)
2011–2016	IF Elfsborg	120	(22)
2011	→ Skövde AIK (loan)	4	(0)
2016–2019	Crotone	89	(6)
2019–2023	Frosinone	117	(10)
2023–2024	Fatih Karagümrük	34	(4)
2024–2026	AEK Larnaca	48	(5)
2026–	IF Elfsborg	0	(0)

International career^{‡}
2008	Sweden U17	3	(0)
2012	Sweden U21	1	(0)
2015–2023	Sweden	19	(2)
- * Club domestic league appearances and goals as of 8 July 2026 ‡ National team caps and goals as of 19:45, 12 October 2023 (UTC)

Marcus Christer Rohdén (born 11 May 1991) is a Swedish professional footballer who plays as a midfielder for IF Elfsborg.

Beginning his career with IF Elfsborg in 2011, he won Allsvenskan and Svenska Cupen with the club before moving to Crotone and Serie A in 2016. In 2019, he signed with Frosinone. A full international between 2015 and 2023, he won 19 caps for the Sweden national team and represented his country at the 2018 FIFA World Cup.

== Club career ==
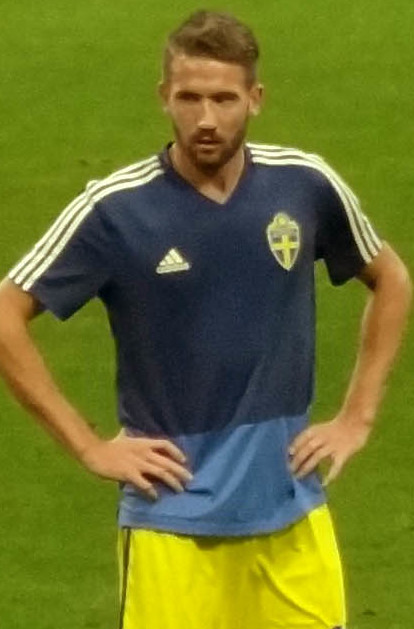
Rohdén training with Sweden at the 2018 FIFA World Cup

Rohdén started his career in Hössna IF and moved to IF Elfsborg as a 16-year-old signing a youth contract. In December 2011 Marcus signed a senior contract with IF Elfsborg on a five-year deal after returning from a loan at Skövde AIK. He scored his first goal in Allsvenskan against BK Häcken on 26 August 2012, in his debut season in both Elfsborg and Allsvenskan.

On 3 August 2016, Rohdén signed for Serie A newcomers Crotone.

On 13 August 2019, Rohdén was announced as a Frosinone player.

On July 26, 2023, he signed a 2-year contract with Süper Lig club Fatih Karagümrük.

Rohdén was announced at AEK Larnaca on 9 July 2024, signing a two-year contract.

After leaving AEK Larnaca in summer 2026, Rohdén moved back to his former club IF Elfsborg where he signed a two-and-a-half year contract.

== International career ==
Rohdén represented the Sweden U17 and U21 teams before making his full international debut for Sweden on 15 January 2015 in a friendly 2–0 win against the Ivory Coast. He also scored his first international goal in the same match. He made his competitive debut for Sweden in a 2018 FIFA World Cup qualifier against the Netherlands, playing for 77 minutes before being replaced by Emir Kujovic in a 1–1 draw.

In May 2018 he was named in Sweden's 23 man squad for the 2018 FIFA World Cup in Russia. He remained on the bench in all five games as Sweden reached the quarter-finals in a FIFA World Cup for the first time since 1994.

== Personal life ==
Rohdén is one of the founders of the menswear brand Ciszere.

== Career statistics ==
=== Club ===
As of matches played 26 August 2023

Appearances and goals by club, season and competition
Club	Season	League			National Cup		Europe		Other		Total	
Club	Season	Division	Apps	Goals	Apps	Goals	Apps	Goals	Apps	Goals	Apps	Goals
Elfsborg	2011	Allsvenskan	0	0	0	0	—		—		0	0
Elfsborg	2012	Allsvenskan	22	2	4	2	3 (Note: Appearances in the Europa League)	0	—		29	4
Elfsborg	2013	Allsvenskan	28	4	7	4	11 (Note: Four appearances and two goals in the Champions League; seven appearances in the Europa League)	2	—		46	10
Elfsborg	2014	Allsvenskan	28	5	6	0	6	1	1 (Note: Appearance in the Svenska Supercupen)	0	41	6
Elfsborg	2015	Allsvenskan	27	7	4	0	6	2	—		37	9
Elfsborg	2016	Allsvenskan	15	4	0	0	0	0	—		15	4
Elfsborg	Total		120	22	21	6	26	5	1	0	168	33
Skövde AIK (loan)	2011	Division 1 Södra	4	0	0	0	—		—		4	0
Crotone	2016–17	Serie A	34	1	1	0	—		—		35	1
Crotone	2017–18	Serie A	26	2	2	0	—		—		28	2
Crotone	2018–19	Serie B	29	3	2	1	—		—		31	4
Crotone	Total		89	6	5	1	0	0	0	0	94	7
Frosinone	2019–20	Serie B	30	3	0	0	—		—		30	3
Frosinone	2020–21	Serie B	32	2	1	0	—		—		33	2
Frosinone	2021–22	Serie B	22	2	1	0	—		—		21	2
Frosinone	2022–23	Serie B	33	1	1	0	—		—		4	1
Frosinone	Total		117	10	3	0	0	0	0	0	120	10
Fatih Karagümrük	2023–24	Süper Lig	2	0	0	0	—		—		2	0
Career total			332	38	29	7	26	5	1	0	388	50

=== International ===
As of match played 12 October 2023

Appearances and goals by national team and year
National team	Year	Apps	Goals
Sweden	2015	3	1
Sweden	2016	5	0
Sweden	2017	2	0
Sweden	2018	5	0
Sweden	2019	0	0
Sweden	2020	0	0
Sweden	2021	0	0
Sweden	2022	2	1
Sweden	2023	2	0
Total		19	2

Scores and results list Sweden's goal tally first, score column indicates score after each Rohdén goal.

List of international goals scored by Marcus Rohdén
No.	Date	Venue	Opponent	Score	Result	Competition	Ref.
1	15 January 2015	Zayed Sports City Stadium, Abu Dhabi, United Arab Emirates	Ivory Coast	2–0	2–0	Friendly	
2	16 November 2022	Estadi Montilivi, Girona, Spain	Mexico	1–0	2–1	Friendly	

== Honours ==
Elfsborg

- Allsvenskan: 2012
- Svenska Cupen: 2012-13

Frosinone

- Serie B: 2022-23

AEK Larnaca

- Cypriot Cup: 2024–25
