= Francesco Cassata =

Italian footballer (born 1997)

Personal information
- Full name: Francesco D'Assisi Cassata
- Date of birth: 16 July 1997 (age 29)
- Place of birth: Sarzana, Italy
- Height: 1.83 m (6 ft 0 in)
- Position: Midfielder

Team information
- Current team: Spezia
- Number: 29

Youth career
- Empoli
- 2015–2016: Juventus

Senior career*
Years	Team	Apps	(Gls)
2016–2017	Juventus	0	(0)
2016–2017	→ Ascoli (loan)	36	(1)
2017–2020	Sassuolo	10	(1)
2018–2019	→ Frosinone (loa	19	(2)
2019–2020	→ Genoa (loan)	24	(2)
2020–2024	Genoa	9	(0)
2022	→ Parma (loan)	1	(0)
2022–2023	→ Ternana (loan)	27	(0)
2023–2024	→ Spezia (loan)	31	(0)
2024–	Spezia	49	(0)

International career^{‡}
2013–2014	Italy U-17	3	(0)
2014–2015	Italy U-18	5	(0)
2015–2016	Italy U19	5	(0)
2016–2018	Italy U20	12	(0)
2018	Italy U21	2	(0)
Medal record
Men's football
Representing Italy
FIFA U-20 World Cup
Third place	2017 South Korea
UEFA European Under-19 Championship
Runner-up	2016 Germany
- * Club domestic league appearances and goals as of 2 March 2026 ‡ National team caps and goals as of 11 September 2018

Francesco D'Assisi Cassata (born 16 July 1997) is an Italian professional footballer who plays as a midfielder for Serie C Group B club Spezia.

== Club career ==
On 18 January 2022, Cassata joined Parma on loan until the end of the 2021–22 season, with an option to buy.

On 30 August 2022, Cassata was loaned to Ternana with an option to buy.

On 18 July 2023, Cassata joined Serie B club Spezia for two seasons. The 2023–24 season is a loan, with the obligation to buy for the 2024–25 season.

== International career ==
Francesco Cassata received his first official Italy U21 call-up on 27 May 2018, when Luigi Di Biagio summoned him as an injury replacement for Nicolò Barella ahead of the friendly against France. On 6 September 2018, Cassata made his debut with Italy U21 team in a friendly match lost 3–0 against Slovakia.

== Career statistics ==
As of match played 23 August 2024

Appearances and goals by club, season and competition
Club	Season	League	League		Cup (Note: Includes Coppa Italia)		Europe		Other		Total	
Club	Season	League	Apps	Goals	Apps	Goals	Apps	Goals	Apps	Goals	Apps	Goals
Ascoli (loan)	2016–17	Serie B	36	1	–		–		–		36	1
Sassuolo	2017–18	Serie A	10	1	2	0	–		–		12	1
Frosinone (loan)	2018–19	Serie A	19	2	0	0	–		–		19	2
Genoa (loan)	2019–20	Serie A	24	2	2	0	–		–		26	2
Genoa	2020–21	Serie A	8	0	1	0	–		–		9	0
Genoa	2021–22	Serie A	1	0	1	0	–		–		2	0
Genoa	Total		33	2	4	0	–		–		37	2
Parma (loan)	2021–22	Serie B	1	0	0	0	–		–		1	0
Ternana (loan)	2022–23	Serie B	27	0	0	0	–		–		27	0
Spezia (loan)	2023–24	Serie B	31	0	1	0	–		–		32	0
Career total			157	6	7	0	–		–		164	6

== Honours ==
Italy U19

- UEFA European Under-19 Championship runner-up: 2016

Italy U20

- FIFA U-20 World Cup third place: 2017
