= Marcello Trotta =

Italian footballer (born 1992)

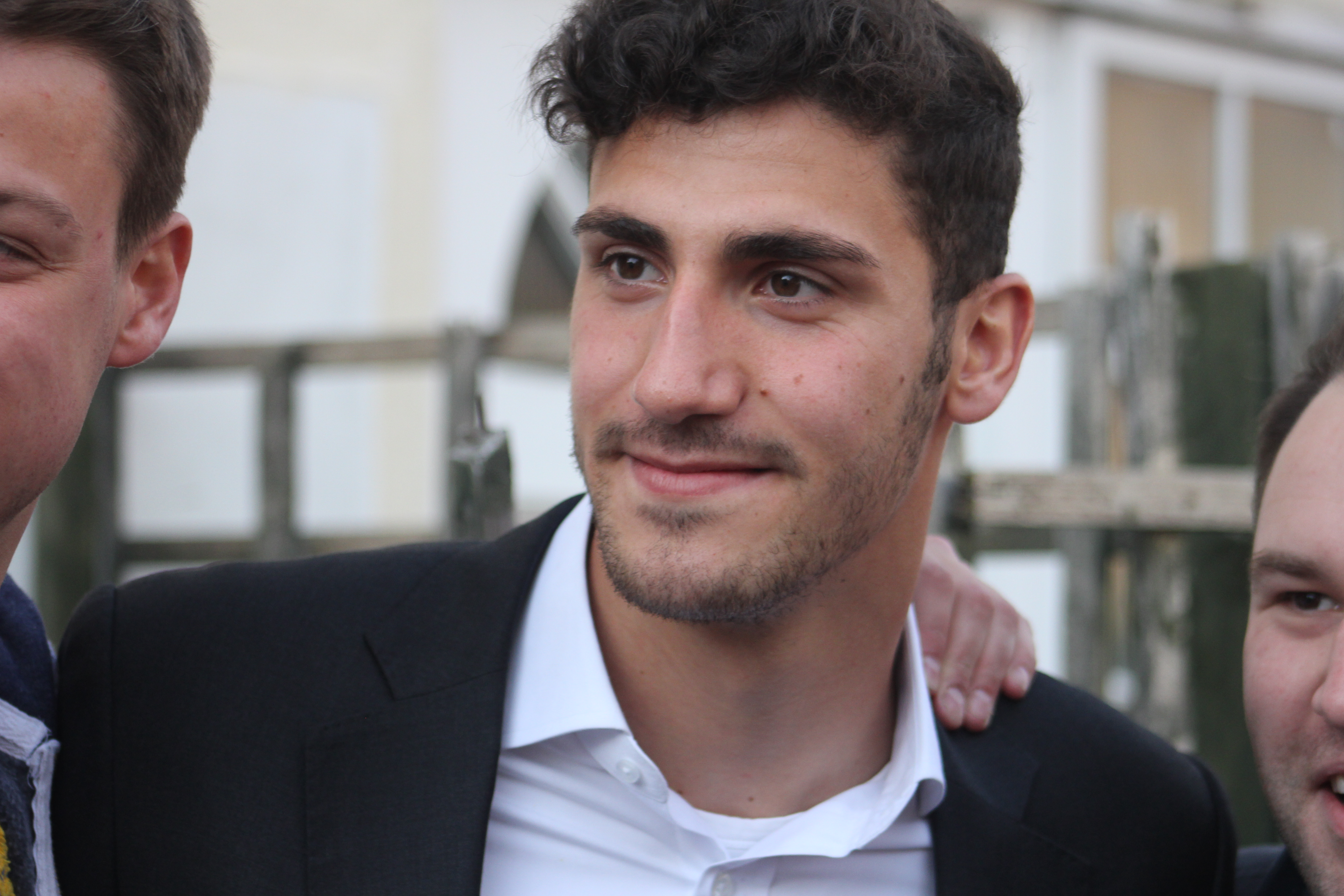
- Trotta in 2014

Personal information
- Full name: Marcello Trotta
- Date of birth: 29 September 1992 (age 34)
- Place of birth: Santa Maria Capua Vetere, Italy
- Height: 1.88 m (6 ft 2 in)
- Position: Forward

Team information
- Current team: Hamrun Spartans
- Number: 29

Youth career
- 2004–2008: Napoli
- 2008–2009: Manchester City
- 2009–2011: Fulham

Senior career*
Years	Team	Apps	(Gls)
2011–2015	Fulham	1	(0)
2011–2012	→ Wycombe Wanderers (loan)	8	(8)
2012–2013	→ Watford (loan)	1	(0)
2012–2013	→ Brentford (loan)	22	(6)
2013–2014	→ Brentford (loan)	37	(13)
2014–2015	→ Barnsley (loan)	5	(1)
2015–2016	Avellino	36	(13)
2016–2019	Sassuolo	13	(1)
2016–2017	→ Crotone (loan)	29	(3)
2017–2018	→ Crotone (loan)	34	(7)
2019–2021	Frosinone	22	(0)
2020	→ Ascoli (loan)	17	(6)
2020–2021	→ Famalicão (loan)	6	(0)
2021	→ Cosenza (loan)	18	(1)
2021–2022	Triestina	30	(6)
2022–2023	Avellino	32	(6)
2023–2024	Pistoiese	10	(3)
2024	Brindisi	12	(3)
2024–2026	Turris	9	(0)
2026-	Hamrun Spartans	4	(2)

International career
2008–2009	Italy U16	4	(2)
2009–2010	Italy U18	1	(1)
2010	Italy U19	1	(0)
2012	Italy U20	1	(0)
2014–2015	Italy U21	9	(3)
- * Club domestic league appearances and goals as of 18 December 2024

Marcello Trotta (born 29 September 1992) is an Italian professional footballer who plays as a forward for Maltese club Hamrun Spartans

== Club career ==
=== Early career ===
Born in Santa Maria Capua Vetere, Italy, Trotta began his career in the youth team at Serie A club Napoli and decided to leave to experience "a new culture, a new language, a new type of football" in England. In September 2013, he revealed that he would be interested in signing again for Napoli in the future if the opportunity arose, as England provided no new football at all. He joined the academy at Premier League club Manchester City in 2008. The club described him as one of the club's brightest young talents, with his skill and ruthlessness in front of goal. He only lasted three months with the club.

=== Fulham ===
Trotta signed a professional contract with Premier League club Fulham in September 2009. He made six appearances in the Premier Reserve League South during the 2009–10 season and scored two goals. He received his first call up to the first team for a Europa League qualifying match versus Crusaders on 21 July 2011, where he was an unused substitute for a 4–0 win. He made his first senior appearance for Fulham in a 2–1 FA Cup fourth round defeat to Everton on 27 January 2012. He replaced Danny Murphy after 87 minutes. In the days after the game, Trotta was the subject of loan attention from Scottish Premier League club Rangers as a replacement for Nikica Jelavić, but a deal never materialised. After featuring as an unused substitute through the latter months of the 2011–12 season, Trotta made his Premier League debut in Fulham's away match against Bolton Wanderers on 7 April 2012. He was brought on for Alex Kačaniklić after 88 minutes and almost scored a goal in the dying minutes of a comfortable 3–0 win for the Cottagers. Trotta made two senior appearances during the 2011–12 season and also clocked up 14 Premier Reserve League South appearances, scoring 15 goals. He netted five times in a 7–0 thrashing of Bolton Wanderers on 30 August and scored four in a 6–2 win over Norwich City on 4 October.

At the start of the 2012–13 season, Trotta signed a new deal which would keep him at Craven Cottage until the summer of 2015. He was called into the first team squad on one occasion during the 2012–13 season, when he was an unused substitute for a 3–0 win over West Bromwich Albion on 15 September 2012. He made six U21 Premier League appearances and scored three goals during the 2012–13 season.

Trotta made his only appearance of the 2013–14 season in a 1–0 U21 Premier League win over Middlesbrough on 16 August 2013, lasting 81 minutes before being substituted for Dino Islamović. In September 2013, then-manager Martin Jol stated that Trotta is not "the finished article yet" and challenged him to "step up a gear and then maybe he can play for Fulham in the next couple of years". In January 2014, Trotta was the subject of loan attention from a number of Italian Serie B clubs. After returning to Craven Cottage on 4 May from his loan away from the club, new manager Felix Magath cast his eye over Trotta in training prior to the final Premier League match of the season against Crystal Palace, but the Italian failed to make the squad. With the Cottagers playing in the Championship for the 2014–15 season, it was reported on 13 May that Trotta was keen to sit down for talks with Magath over his future. The talks were subsequently postponed until June, casting further doubts over his future. Those doubts were confirmed when Trotta submitted a transfer request on 3 June. He failed to receive a first team call under Magath or his successor Kit Symons and departed Craven Cottage on 9 January 2015. He made just three senior appearances in five years at Craven Cottage.

==== Wycombe Wanderers (loan) ====
Trotta moved on an initial one-month loan to League One club Wycombe Wanderers on 24 November 2011 and scored on his debut against Milton Keynes Dons in a 4–3 loss. He scored in the following fixture against Chesterfield on 20 December and again in the next fixture, away at Carlisle. Fulham confirmed that Trotta's loan had been extended until 14 January 2012 and on Boxing Day 2011 he scored a hat-trick (the first professional hat-trick of his career) against Exeter City in a 3–1 win. After the match, Manager Gary Waddock labelled him a "goal-scoring machine" after Trotta took his tally to six goals in four games. On 14 January 2012, Trotta netted a brace in Wycombe's 3–2 loss to Preston North End at Deepdale. Despite being offered an extension, he ended his loan spell at Wycombe on 17 January 2012. After his loan spell ended, Waddock insisted he had no hard feelings about Trotta choosing to test himself at a higher level. Trotta made eight appearances for Wycombe and scored eight goals.

==== Watford (loan) ====
On 23 February 2012, Trotta joined Championship club Watford on a one-month youth loan. He made his debut in a 3–0 league defeat to Southampton two days later. He started the match and was brought off after 59 minutes for Joe Garner. He was an unused substitute for the following three games and returned to Fulham after his loan expired having made only one appearance for the club.

==== Brentford (loan) ====
On 22 November 2012, Fulham confirmed that Trotta would join League One club Brentford on loan, initially until 13 January 2013. Two days later, he made his debut for the club, coming on as a substitute for Lee Hodson, in a 2–0 win against Sheffield United. He scored twice before setting up a goal for Harry Forrester, in a 4–2 FA Cup second round replay win over Bradford City on 18 December. He scored his first league goal for the club in a 3–1 win over Colchester United on Boxing Day. Fulham confirmed on 14 January that Trotta would stay with Brentford until the end of the 2012–13 season. On 27 January 2013, Trotta scored the opening goal of a memorable 2–2 FA Cup fourth round draw against Chelsea. He scored in bursts over the remainder of the season, scoring two in two games against Bury and Stevenage in February and three goals in four games in April.

==== Doncaster Rovers penalty incident ====
Brentford's final game of the regular season came against Doncaster Rovers at Griffin Park on 27 April 2013. With the score at 0–0 and Brentford needing to win to secure automatic promotion to the Championship, the Bees were handed a lifeline when they won a penalty in the fourth of five minutes' injury time. Defender Kevin O'Connor was manager Uwe Rösler's designated penalty taker, but Trotta wrestled the ball from O'Connor, with the intention of taking the penalty. Trotta slammed the spot-kick against the crossbar and Doncaster scored from the resulting breakaway, winning the game 1–0 and consigning Brentford to the end-of-season playoffs. Rösler stated after the game that he had not wanted him to take the penalty, saying "I am not going to hold anyone out to dry. We will deal with the matter internally". In another interview, Rösler said he refused to blame him for the outcome. As a result of the penalty incident, Rösler decided to instruct which players will take the penalties by putting a sheet up in the dressing room ahead of play-off matches against Swindon Town. Trotta, commented after the incident:

I scored my last penalty and was feeling confident, so I stepped up to take it. Unfortunately I hit the bar. I was devastated and didn't sleep for two days afterwards. I couldn't stop thinking about it. But the guys here have been brilliant and have helped me a lot. This is a chance now for me to put it right. I want to give even more because I feel it was down to me. We have got another opportunity and will do our best to get to Wembley. It's a tough schedule and a massive couple of days for the club, but we have a big enough squad to cope. This is a new scenario for me and a lot of the lads because we've never been involved in the play-offs. We will do our best to win.

Trotta was an unused substitute for the first leg of the playoff semi-finals versus Swindon Town (which resulted in a 1–1 draw, via a penalty from Kevin O'Connor) and he played 82 minutes of the second leg at Griffin Park, being credited with an assist for Clayton Donaldson's goal, which put Brentford 2–0 up. He was substituted for Paul Hayes after 82 minutes. With the score at 3–3 at the end of extra time, Brentford advanced to the final after winning the resulting penalty shootout 5–4. He praised the Brentford fans for being there for him after the worst week of his career. Trotta started the playoff final versus Yeovil Town at Wembley Stadium up front alongside Clayton Donaldson, but he was brought off for Bradley Wright-Phillips after 62 minutes of the 2–1 defeat. He returned to Fulham after the match, having made 29 appearances and scored 9 goals during the 2012–13 season.

==== Return to Brentford (loan) ====
On 2 September 2013, Trotta rejoined Brentford on loan until 5 January 2014. His return was met with resistance from some Brentford supporters and Uwe Rösler was forced to move quickly to state that "Marcello knows some people have not forgotten what happened, but he wants to come here and fight for his place". After his arrival, he said "I can’t change what happened in the past – but I can in the future". Trotta failed to score until his seventh appearance, a goal which set up a run of four goals in six games through October and November 2013. He scored three goals in three games in December (netting in wins against Preston North End, Swindon Town and Milton Keynes Dons) to help fire Brentford to the top of League One. On 7 January 2014, Trotta's loan was extended until the end of the 2013–14 season. Three goals and two assists in five games in January saw him nominated for the League One Player Of The Month award. He notched his 20th career goal for Brentford with the opener in a 1–1 draw with Shrewsbury Town on 1 February.

Trotta scored the winner in a crunch match versus Leyton Orient on 15 March, firing in the only goal of the game in front of the Sky Sports cameras at Brisbane Road, which saw the Bees return to the automatic promotion places in League One. The strike later won him the club's Bees Player Outstanding Moment of the Season award. He made it two goals in two games when he put the Bees ahead of Coventry City in a 3–1 win the following week. A 1–0 win over Preston North End at Griffin Park on 18 April saw Brentford promoted to the Championship with three games remaining. After the match, Trotta said "I felt I owed something to Brentford, that’s why I decided to come back after what happened last year. I dug in and wanted to repay the fans and the club. The lads have been great and it’s a special day". He made 40 appearances and scored 13 goals during the campaign. It was reported after the season that manager Mark Warburton was interested in signing Trotta on a permanent deal, but the club's interest cooled in mid-June. Across both his spells with Brentford, Trotta made 69 appearances and scored 23 goals.

==== Barnsley (loan) ====
On 1 November 2014, Trotta joined League One club Barnsley on loan until 5 January 2015. He made seven appearances and scored one goal before returning to Craven Cottage.

=== Avellino ===
On 9 January 2015, Trotta returned to Italy to sign for Serie B club Avellino on a deal until 30 June 2017.

=== Sassuolo ===
On 20 January 2016, Trotta was signed by Serie A club Sassuolo.

On 31 August 2016, Trotta and Diego Falcinelli were signed by F.C. Crotone in a temporary deal.

=== Frosinone ===
On 25 January 2019, Trotta signed with Frosinone.

==== Loan to Ascoli ====
On 27 January 2020, he joined Ascoli on loan with an option to buy.

==== Loan to Famalicão ====
On 5 October 2020, he was loaned to Portuguese club Famalicão with an option to buy.

==== Loan to Cosenza ====
On 23 January 2021, he moved on a new loan to Serie B club Cosenza.

=== Triestina ===
On 31 August 2021, he signed with Triestina in Serie C.

=== Return to Avellino ===
On 2 September 2022, Trotta returned to Avellino on a two-year contract. On 31 August 2023, his contract with Avellino was terminated by mutual consent.

=== Malta ===
Trotta signs for Maltese Club Hamrun Spartans

== International career ==
Trotta has represented Italy from U16 through to U21 level. level. He made his only appearance for the U18s in a friendly versus Belarus U17 on 26 May 2010. He replaced Alberto Libertazzi after 49 minutes and scored Italy's second goal in a 2–0 win.

His only appearance for the U19s came before his U18 debut, in a 1–1 draw with Germany on 17 March 2010. He played for the final 9 minutes after replacing Mattia Destro. Trotta's solitary U20 cap came in a 3–1 victory over Denmark on 18 April 2012, where he was taken off at half time.

Trotta received his first call up to the U21 squad for a friendly against Italy B on 17 December 2013. He played and scored in the 3–0 win, though it was an unsanctioned international match and he didn't win a cap. He was called up to the U21 squad in January 2014 for an unsanctioned three-way friendly tournament and training camp in Florence between the Italy U21, U20 and U19 squads. Trotta made his official debut for the U21s in a 2015 European U21 Championship qualifier against Northern Ireland on 5 March 2014. He scored the second goal in a 2–0 victory. Trotta was called up to another training camp in Florence in late April 2014 and scored two goals in a 2–0 training ground win over Fiorentina Primavera on 29 April. On 1 June, Trotta received another call into the U21 squad in advance of a friendly versus Montenegro on 4 June. Coming on as a 28th-minute substitute for Domenico Berardi, Trotta scored the fourth goal in a 4–0 victory.

== Career statistics ==
As of match played 25 May 2019

Appearances and goals by club, season and competition
Club	Season	League			National cup		League cup		Europe		Other		Total	
Club	Season	Division	Apps	Goals	Apps	Goals	Apps	Goals	Apps	Goals	Apps	Goals	Apps	Goals
Fulham	2011–12	Premier League	1	0	1	0	0	0	0	0	–		2	0
Fulham	2012–13	Premier League	0	0	–		1	0	–		–		1	0
Fulham	Total		1	0	1	0	1	0	0	0	–		3	0
Wycombe Wanderers (loan)	2011–12	League One	8	8	–		–		–		–		8	8
Watford (loan)	2011–12	Championship	1	0	–		–		–		–		1	0
Brentford (loan)	2012–13	League One	22	6	5	3	–		–		2 (Note: Appearances in League One play-offs)	0	29	9
Brentford (loan)	2013–14	League One	37	13	2	1	–		–		1 (Note: Appearance in Football League Trophy)	0	40	14
Barnsley (loan)	2014–15	League One	5	1	2	0	–		–		–		7	1
Avellino	2014–15	Serie B	16	5	–		–		–		3 (Note: Appearances in Serie B promotion play-offs)	2	19	7
Avellino	2015–16	Serie B	20	8	2	2	–		–		–		22	10
Avellino	Total		36	13	2	2	0	0	0	0	3	2	41	17
Sassuolo	2015–16	Serie A	8	1	–		–		–		–		8	1
Sassuolo	2016–17	Serie A	0	0	–		–		2 (Note: Appearances in Europa League)	0	–		2	0
Sassuolo	2018–19	Serie A	5	0	1	0	–		–		–		6	0
Sassuolo	Total		13	1	1	0	–		2	0	–		16	1
Crotone (loan)	2016–17	Serie A	29	3	–		–		–		–		29	3
Crotone (loan)	2017–18	Serie A	34	7	1	1	–		–		–		35	8
Frosinone	2018–19	Serie A	12	0	–		–		–		–		12	0
Frosinone	2019–20	Serie B	10	0	3	0	–		–		–		13	0
Frosinone	Total		22	0	3	0	0	0	0	0	0	0	25	0
Ascoli (loan)	2019–20	Serie B	17	6	–		–		–		–		17	6
Famalicão (loan)	2020–21	Primeira Liga	6	0	1	0	–		–		–		7	0
Cosenza (loan)	2020–21	Serie B	18	1	–		–		–		–		18	1
Triestina	2021–22	Serie C	7	1	–		–		–		–		7	1
Career total			256	60	18	7	1	0	2	0	6	2	283	63

== Honours ==
Brentford

- Football League One second-place promotion: 2013–14
