= Nicola Citro =

Italian football player

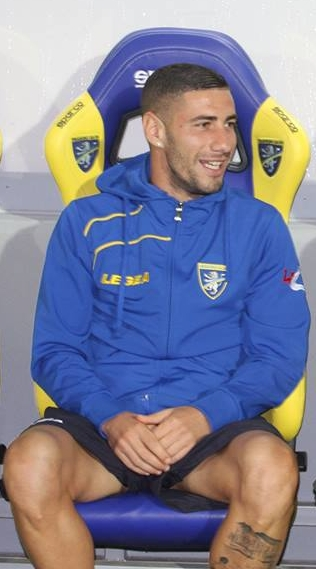

Personal information
- Date of birth: 27 May 1989 (age 37)
- Place of birth: Salerno, Italy
- Height: 1.72 m (5 ft 7 1/2 in)
- Position: Forward

Team information
- Current team: Matera
- Number: 10

Senior career*
Years	Team	Apps	(Gls)
2007–2008	Sanseverinese	20	(7)
2008–2011	Ebolitana	68	(22)
2011–2012	Valle Grecanica	11	(4)
2012–2013	ACR Messina	31	(10)
2013–2014	Marcianise	32	(21)
2014–2018	Trapani	82	(19)
2017–2018	→ Frosinone (loan)	31	(4)
2018–2020	Frosinone	17	(2)
2018–2019	→ Venezia (loan)	17	(5)
2020–2022	Bari	25	(2)
2022	Pistoiese	12	(3)
2022–2024	Casarano	47	(10)
2024–	Matera	9	(3)
- * Club domestic league appearances and goals as of 17 November 2024

Nicola Citro (born 27 May 1989) is an Italian football player who plays as a forward for Serie D club Matera.

== Career ==
He made his professional debut in the Serie B for Trapani on 19 September 2014 in a game against Carpi.

On 17 August 2018, he joined Venezia on a season-long loan. Venezia held a buyout option at the end of the loan.

On 5 October 2020 he signed a two-year contract with Bari.

On 16 September 2022, Citro signed with Pistoiese in Serie D.

== Honours ==
Bari

- Serie C: 2021–22 (Group C)
