= Emmanuel Besea =

Ghanaian footballer

Personal information
- Full name: Prince Emmanuel Doudu Besea
- Date of birth: 15 April 1997 (age 29)
- Place of birth: Wenchi, Ghana
- Height: 1.93 m (6 ft 4 in)
- Position: Midfielder

Youth career
- Modena

Senior career*
Years	Team	Apps	(Gls)
2013–2017	Modena	18	(2)
2017–2020	Frosinone	6	(0)
2019	→ Venezia (loan)	7	(0)
2019–2020	→ Viterbese (loan)	18	(0)
2020–2021	Viterbese	20	(1)
2021–2022	Vis Pesaro	15	(1)
- * Club domestic league appearances and goals as of 23 April 2022

Prince Emmanuel Doudu Besea, known as Emmanuel Besea (born 15 April 1997) is a Ghanaian footballer who plays as a midfielder.

== Club career ==
He made his professional debut in the Serie B for Modena on 17 October 2015 in a game against Ascoli.

On 2 September 2019, he joined Viterbese on loan.

On 5 October 2020 his contract with Frosinone was terminated by mutual consent.

On 27 July 2021, he signed with Vis Pesaro for a term of one year with an option to extend for another year.
