= Michele Volpe =

Italian footballer

Personal information
- Date of birth: 16 September 1997 (age 29)
- Place of birth: Benevento, Italy
- Height: 1.93 m (6 ft 4 in)
- Position: Forward

Team information
- Current team: San Marino

Youth career
- Frosinone

Senior career*
Years	Team	Apps	(Gls)
2016–2023	Frosinone	5	(0)
2018–2019	→ Rimini (loan)	38	(7)
2019–2020	→ Viterbese (loan)	22	(10)
2021	→ Catania (loan)	1	(0)
2021–2022	→ Viterbese (loan)	13	(4)
2022	→ Vibonese (loan)	7	(1)
2022–2023	→ Pergolettese (loan)	6	(0)
2023	→ Juve Stabia (loan)	7	(1)
2023–2024	Alessandria	6	(0)
2024–2025	USD Palmese	25	(9)
2025	Termoli	12	(2)
2025–2026	Sarnese	4	(0)
2026–	San Marino	0	(0)
- * Club domestic league appearances and goals as of 12 February 2026

Michele Volpe (born 16 September 1997) is an Italian footballer who plays as a forward for San Marino.

== Club career ==
He made his professional debut in the Serie B for Frosinone on 10 December 2016 in a game against Salernitana.

On 7 August 2019, he joined Viterbese on loan.

On 1 February 2021 he was loaned to Catania.

On 9 July 2021, he returned to Viterbese on another loan.

On 27 January 2022, he joined Vibonese on loan.

On 13 July 2022, Volpe was loaned to Pergolettese. On 31 January 2023, he moved on a new loan to Juve Stabia.

On 31 August 2023, Volpe signed a one-year contract with Alessandria.
