= Luca Paganini =

Italian footballer (born 1993)

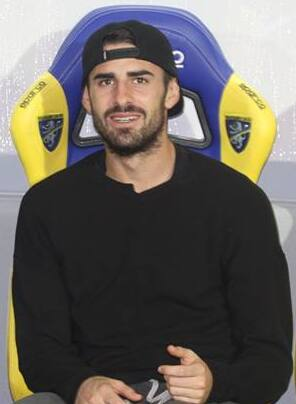

Personal information
- Date of birth: 8 June 1993 (age 33)
- Place of birth: Rome, Italy
- Height: 1.82 m (6 ft 0 in)
- Position: Right winger

Team information
- Current team: Treviso
- Number: 17

Youth career
- –2011: Frosinone

Senior career*
Years	Team	Apps	(Gls)
2011–2020	Frosinone	179	(26)
2013	→ Fondi (loan)	16	(2)
2020–2021	Lecce	27	(1)
2021–2022	Ascoli	12	(0)
2022–2023	Triestina	32	(3)
2023–2024	Latina	36	(2)
2024–2026	Vis Pesaro	59	(8)
2026–	Treviso	1	(0)
- * Club domestic league appearances and goals as of 23 August 2026

Luca Paganini (born 8 June 1993) is an Italian footballer who plays as a right winger for Serie C Group A club Treviso.

== Club career ==
Paganini is a youth exponent from Frosinone Calcio. He made his first team debut on 18 December 2011 against U.S. Siracusa in a Lega Pro Prima Divisione game. He came in as an 89th-minute substitute for Fabio Catacchini in a 1-0 away defeat. He was loaned out to Fondi for six months from January 2013 until June 2013. He scored his first Serie A goal on 18 October 2015 with Frosinone after a 2–0 defeat of Sampdoria.

On 7 September 2020, he joined Lecce.

On 27 January 2022, he signed with Ascoli until the end of the 2021–22 season.

On 24 August 2022, Paganini signed a two-year contract with Triestina.

On 4 July 2024, he moved to Vis Pesaro on a two-year deal.
