= Andrea Beghetto =

Italian footballer (born 1994)

Personal information
- Date of birth: 11 October 1994 (age 32)
- Place of birth: Perugia, Italy
- Height: 1.82 m (6 ft 0 in)
- Positions: Left-back; central midfielder

Team information
- Current team: Conegliano

Youth career
- –2011: Montebelluna
- 2011–2013: Padova

Senior career*
| Years | Team | Apps | (Gls) |
| 2013–2014 | Padova | 0 | (0) |
| 2013–2014 | → Bellaria Igea Marina (loan) | 25 | (0) |
| 2014–2015 | Este | 36 | (12) |
| 2015–2017 | SPAL | 31 | (0) |
| 2017–2018 | Genoa | 3 | (0) |
| 2017–2018 | → Frosinone (loan) | 31 | (1) |
| 2018–2021 | Frosinone | 70 | (2) |
| 2021 | → Pisa (loan) | 12 | (0) |
| 2021–2026 | Pisa | 0 | (0) |
| 2021–2022 | → Alessandria (loan) | 13 | (0) |
| 2022 | → Perugia (loan) | 17 | (0) |
| 2022–2023 | → Perugia (loan) | 7 | (0) |
| 2023 | → Venezia (loan) | 2 | (0) |
| 2024–2025 | → Lecco (loan) | 13 | (0) |
| 2025 | → Vicenza (loan) | 6 | (0) |
| 2025–2026 | → Vis Pesaro (loan) | 7 | (0) |
| 2026– | Conegliano | 0 | (0) |
- * Club domestic league appearances and goals as of 30 April 2026

Andrea Beghetto (born 11 October 1994) is an Italian professional footballer who plays as a midfielder for Serie D club Conegliano.

== Club career ==
=== SPAL and Genoa ===
Beghetto began his career in Serie D, starting his career as a fullback or wingback, before switching to a winger, and later to a central midfielder. After a promising season with SPAL in the Serie B, wherein he was considered one of the strongest players, Berghetto transferred to Genoa in January 2017.

=== Frosinone ===
Beghetto transferred to Frosinone on 5 July 2017.

=== Pisa ===
On 31 January 2021 he moved to Pisa. The contract was technically a loan for the first 18 months, after which Pisa was obligated to purchase his rights on a permanent basis.

==== Loans by Pisa ====
On 5 August 2021, he was loaned by Pisa to Alessandria. On 31 January 2022, Beghetto moved on a new loan to Perugia. On 30 August 2022, Beghetto returned to Perugia on a new loan. On 26 January 2023, Beghetto was loaned by Venezia. On 25 July 2024, Beghetto moved on loan to Lecco. On 21 January 2025, he joined Vicenza on loan.

== Personal life ==
Andrea's grandfather Giuseppe is a former Olympic gold-medalist cyclist, his father Massimo is a former footballer and current footballing coach, and his uncle Luigi is a retired professional footballer.

== Honours ==
SPAL

- Lega Pro: 2015–16
- Supercoppa di Lega Pro: 2016
- Serie B: 2016–17
