= Mirko Gori =

Italian footballer

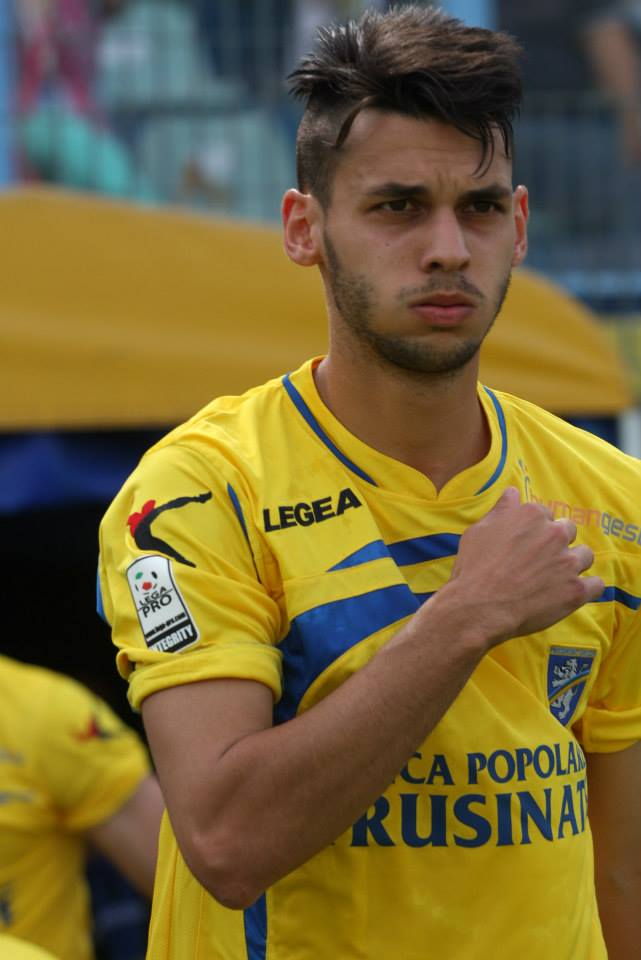

Personal information
- Date of birth: 4 February 1993 (age 33)
- Place of birth: Frosinone, Italy
- Height: 1.77 m (5 ft 10 in)
- Position: Central midfielder

Team information
- Current team: L'Aquila

Youth career
- –2012: Frosinone
- 2010–2011: → Parma (loan)

Senior career*
Years	Team	Apps	(Gls)
2012–2022	Frosinone	203	(2)
2022	→ Alessandria (loan)	14	(0)
2022–2024	Triestina	29	(0)
2024	→ Monterosi (loan)	14	(0)
2024–2026	Desenzano	57	(2)
2026–	L'Aquila	0	(0)

International career
2009	Italy U16	2	(0)
2012	Italy U20 Lega Pro	2	(0)
- * Club domestic league appearances and goals as of 3 May 2026

Mirko Gori (born 4 February 1993) is an Italian footballer who plays as a midfielder for Serie D club L'Aquila.

== Career ==
Gori started his career at Frosinone. He was the member of the under-16–17 mixed team in 2008–09 season, as well as for the under-20 reserve team in 2009–10 season. On 31 August 2010 Gori was signed by Serie A club Parma along with Daniele Abbracciante in temporary deals for €25,000 each. Parma purchased half of the registration rights of Abbracciante but sent Gori back to city of Frosinone after 4 league appearances for Parma's reserve. Gori was a player for Frosinone in Berretti under-19 reserve league in 2011–12 season, due to the first team had relegated from Serie B in 2011 to Lega Pro Prima Divisione, made the reserve ineligible to Primavera reserve league dedicated to Serie A and B clubs. However, the reserve won the national title for the club that season.

Gori was promoted to the first team for 2012–13 Lega Pro Prima Divisione. He made his debut in 2012–13 Coppa Italia against Delta Porto Tolle. Gori was the central midfielder in 4–3–3 formation in the second round of the cup. as well as left central midfielder in the first round of the league. He made 18 starts in the league.

Gori also received call-up to Italy Lega Pro representative teams for the last group match of 2011–13 International Challenge Trophy against Russia, as well as a friendly match against Oman.

On 27 January 2022, he joined Alessandria on loan until the end of the 2021–22 season.

On 9 August 2022, Gori signed a three-year contract with Triestina. Gori's contract with Triestina was terminated by mutual consent on 14 August 2024.
