= Francesco Zampano =

Italian footballer (born 1993)

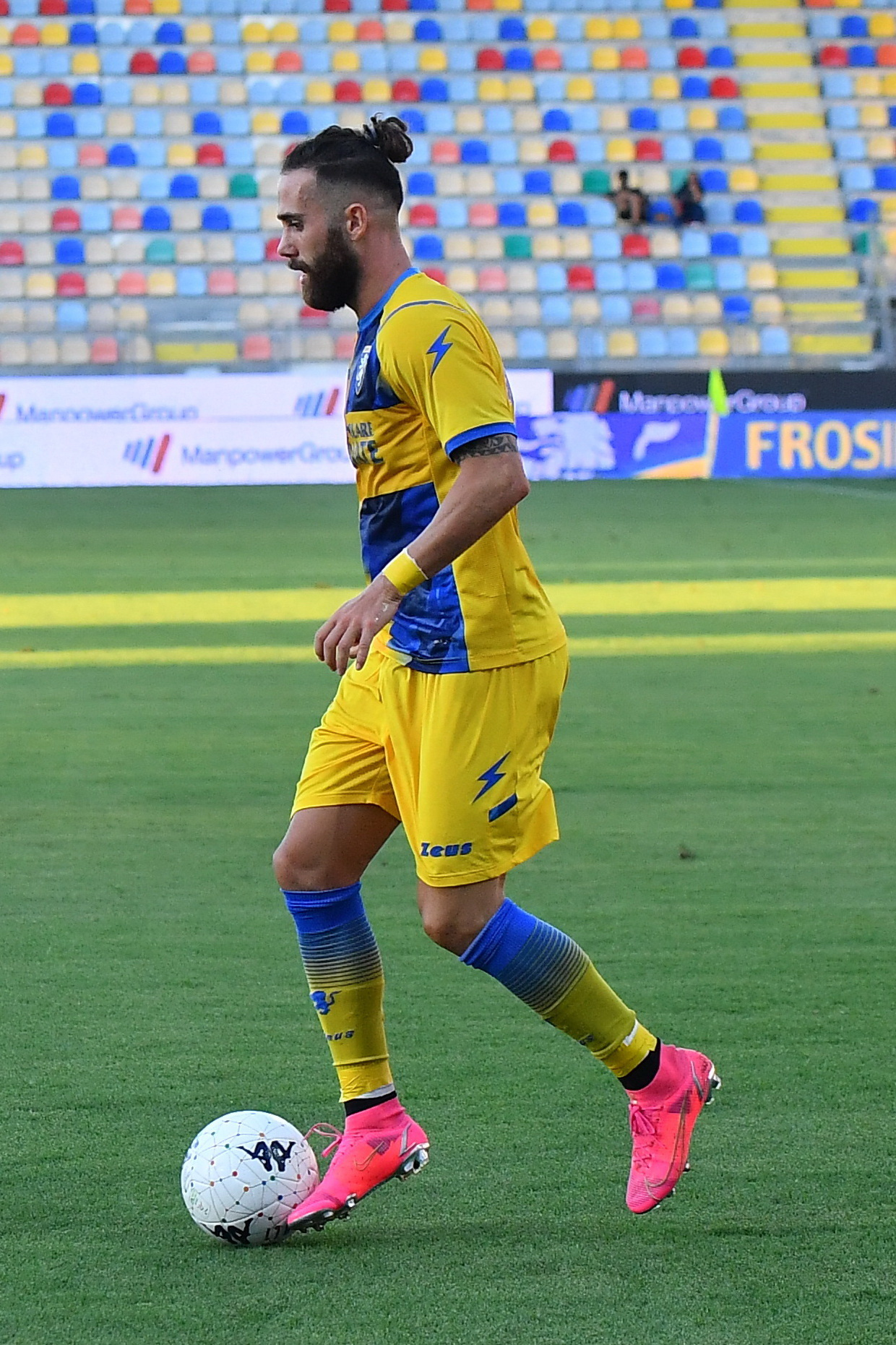
- Zampano with Frosinone in 2021

Personal information
- Full name: Francesco Filippo Zampano
- Date of birth: 30 September 1993 (age 33)
- Place of birth: Genoa, Italy
- Height: 1.78 m (5 ft 10 in)
- Positions: Full-back; midfielder

Team information
- Current team: Modena
- Number: 7

Youth career
- –2011: Sampdoria
- 2010–2011: → Entella (loan)

Senior career*
Years	Team	Apps	(Gls)
2011–2013	Entella	49	(0)
2013–2015	Hellas Verona	0	(0)
2013–2014	→ Juve Stabia (loan)	33	(2)
2014–2015	→ Pescara (loan)	33	(0)
2015–2019	Pescara	79	(1)
2018	→ Udinese (loan)	6	(0)
2018–2019	→ Frosinone (loan)	27	(0)
2019–2022	Frosinone	87	(4)
2022–2025	Venezia	92	(3)
2025–	Modena	35	(4)

International career
2012	Italy U19	6 (Note: FIGC Archive corrupted for the match against Hungary: only 10-men in the archive and Zampano who played 90 minutes, missed.)	(0)
2012–2014	Italy U20	5	(0)
- * Club domestic league appearances and goals as of 10 May 2026

Francesco Filippo Zampano (born 30 September 1993) is an Italian professional footballer who plays as a full-back for Serie B club Modena.

== Club career ==
=== Sampdoria ===
Born in Genoa, Liguria along with his twin brother Giuseppe, they spent their youth career inside the Italian region. Giuseppe and Francesco both played for Genoese side U.C. Sampdoria's U17 team during the 2009–10 season.

=== Virtus Entella ===
In the 2010–11 season both left for another Ligurian team Virtus Entella (named after the river). In the 2011–12 season Entella signed Francesco in a co-ownership deal for a peppercorn of €500, and Giuseppe returned to Sampdoria for their under-19 team. Francesco played for both first team and the U19 team for Entella. Among the defenders of Lega Pro who were born in 1991 or after, Francesco had the fourth highest average score of 6.24/10 ranked by La Gazzetta dello Sport, and was the best Lega Pro defender born in the 1993 age group. In June 2012, Sampdoria failed to buy back Alberto Masi and Francesco Zampano, both due to failing to give the highest price in a sealed bid to Lega Serie B. A. Masi and F. Zampano were the teammates who represented the team of Lega Pro.

=== Verona ===
During summer 2013 he moved to Verona, and then became on loan to Juve Stabia.

=== Pescara ===
After his loan period ended following the 2014–15 season, Zampano was loaned to Pescara, with an option to purchase. On 23 July 2015, Pescara signed Zampano outright.

On 16 August 2018, Zampano joined Serie A team Frosinone on loan until 30 June 2019 with an obligation to buy.

=== Venezia ===
On 1 June 2022, Zampano signed a three-year contract with Venezia.

=== Modena ===
On 8 July 2025, Zampano moved to Modena on a two-season contract.

== International career ==
Francesco Zampano received his first national team call-up in his breakthrough 2011–12 season. Zampano scored a goal against the Italy U19 team when representing the Lega Pro U20 representative team in December 2011. Zampano made his debut for the Italy U19 side on 29 February 2012. He played all 3 games of the 2012 UEFA European Under-19 Football Championship elite qualification in May. He also received a call-up from the Lega Pro representative team for a youth tournament in Dubai in April, however, he did not play.

== Career statistics ==
As of match played 18 May 2025

Appearances and goals by club, season and competition
Club	Season	League			National Cup		Continental		Other		Total	
Club	Season	Division	Apps	Goals	Apps	Goals	Apps	Goals	Apps	Goals	Apps	Goals
Virtus Entella	2011–12	Lega Pro Seconda Divisione	26	0	0	0	—		2 (Note: Appearances in Lega Pro Seconda Divisione-Play-off)	0	28	0
Virtus Entella	2012–13	Lega Pro	23	0	2	0	—		—		25	0
Virtus Entella	Total		49	0	2	0	0	0	2	0	53	0
Juve Stabia (loan)	2013–14	Serie B	33	2	1	0	—		—		34	2
Pescara (loan)	2014–15	Serie B	33	0	0	0	—		5 (Note: Appearances in Serie B – Promotion play-offs)	0	38	0
Pescara	2015–16	Serie B	34	1	2	0	—		4	0	40	1
Pescara	2016–17	Serie A	34	0	2	0	—		—		36	0
Pescara	2017–18	Serie B	11	0	2	0	—		—		13	0
Pescara	Total		112	1	6	0	0	0	9	0	127	1
Udinese (loan)	2017–18	Serie A	6	0	0	0	—		—		6	0
Frosinone (loan)	2018–19	Serie A	27	0	—		—		—		27	0
Frosinone	2019–20	Serie B	19	1	3	0	—		3	0	25	1
Frosinone	2020–21	Serie B	35	1	1	0	—		—		36	1
Frosinone	2021–22	Serie B	33	2	1	0	—		—		34	2
Frosinone	Total		114	4	5	0	0	0	3	0	122	4
Venezia	2022–23	Serie B	33	1	1	0	—		1	0	35	1
Venezia	2023–24	Serie B	35	1	1	0	—		3	0	39	1
Venezia	2024–25	Serie A	24	1	1	0	—		—		25	1
Venezia	Total		92	3	3	0	—		4	0	99	3
Career total			406	10	17	0	0	0	18	0	441	10
