= Luca Matarese =

Italian footballer

Personal information
- Date of birth: 16 April 1998 (age 28)
- Place of birth: Scafati, Italy
- Height: 1.77 m (5 ft 10 in)
- Position: Forward

Youth career
- –2017: Genoa

Senior career*
Years	Team	Apps	(Gls)
2017–2023	Frosinone	15	(0)
2019	→ Foggia (loan)	8	(0)
2020–2021	→ Casertana (loan)	2	(1)
2021–2022	→ Imolese (loan)	16	(1)
2023–2024	Paganese	4	(0)

International career
2014	Italy U-16	5	(0)
2014–2015	Italy U-17	17	(2)
2015–2016	Italy U-18	13	(2)
2016	Italy U-19	3	(0)
- * Club domestic league appearances and goals as of 4 April 2025

Luca Matarese (born 16 April 1998) is an Italian footballer who plays as a forward.

His cousin, Domenico Vanacore, plays for Zeta Milano.

== Club career ==
Matarese made his Serie B debut for Frosinone on 23 September 2017 in a game against Perugia.

On 31 January 2019, he joined Foggia on loan.

On 5 October 2020, he signed with Casertana.

On 28 August 2021, he was loaned to Imolese.

On 21 November 2023, Matarese joined Paganese in Serie D.
