= Camillo Ciano =

Italian footballer (born 1990)

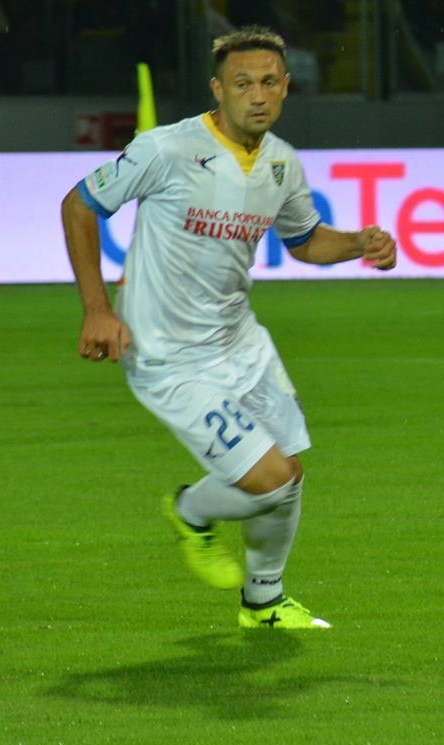

Personal information
- Date of birth: 22 February 1990 (age 36)
- Place of birth: Marcianise, Italy
- Height: 1.80 m (5 ft 11 in)
- Positions: Winger; attacking midfielder

Team information
- Current team: Casertana
- Number: 10

Youth career
- 2007–2009: Napoli

Senior career*
Years	Team	Apps	(Gls)
2009–2014	Napoli	0	(0)
2009–2010	→ Lecco (loan)	31	(8)
2010–2011	→ Cavese (loan)	30	(11)
2011–2013	→ Crotone (loan)	66	(10)
2013–2014	→ Padova (loan)	13	(2)
2014	→ Avellino (loan)	17	(3)
2014–2015	Parma	0	(0)
2014–2015	→ Crotone (loan)	36	(17)
2015–2017	Cesena	68	(27)
2017–2022	Frosinone	164	(36)
2022–2024	Benevento	50	(10)
2025–	Casertana	0	(0)

International career
2006–2007	Italy U-16	1	(0)
2007–2008	Italy U-17	4	(0)
- * Club domestic league appearances and goals as of 7 March 2025

Camillo Ciano (born 22 February 1990) is an Italian professional footballer who plays as a midfielder for club Casertana.

== Career ==
In summer 2014, Ciano was signed by Parma. On 1 September 2014, he was sent to Crotone on a two-year loan deal.

As of the summer of 2015, he has played for Cesena.

On 27 August 2022, Ciano agreed to move to Benevento from Frosinone, with Roberto Insigne moving in the opposite direction in exchange.

On 7 March 2025, Ciano joined Serie C club Casertana.
