= 2015–16 Inter Milan season =

Internazionale
2015–16 season
- Chairman: Erick Thohir
- Manager: Roberto Mancini
- Stadium: San Siro
- Serie A: 4th
- Coppa Italia: Semi-finals
- Top goalscorer: League: Mauro Icardi (16); All: Mauro Icardi (16)
- Highest home attendance: 79,154 vs Milan (13 September 2015); Juventus (18 October 2015)
- Lowest home attendance: 17,102 vs Cagliari (15 December 2015)
- Average home league attendance: 43,414
Home colours	Away colours	Third colours

The 2015–16 season was Football Club Internazionale Milano's 107th in existence and 100th consecutive season in the top flight of Italian football.

== Season overview ==
Internazionale bought several players (Felipe Melo, Stevan Jovetić, Adem Ljajić, Miranda, Geoffrey Kondogbia, Jeison Murillo, Ivan Perišić and Alex Telles), which were for the most part from abroad. The predictable lack of team spirit between the new arrivals (due to the fact that, only months before, they played in foreign leagues) and the absence of a basic plan (Mancini used 19 different lineups in equal games) often caused Inter's results to stem from individual elements. Despite a 4–1 defeat by Fiorentina and three consecutive draws, after the November pause Inter moved up to first place. It was retained until the end of year when the side beats a record: all goals, along the last 12 months, were scored by foreign footballers.

Losing with Sassuolo in January, Inter fell in the standings between January and February. Inter reacted in the Coppa Italia where, in the second leg of the semifinals, Inter defeated Juventus 3–0, which equalized the score of the first leg, however the Turin side then won on penalties. After having wasted chances to reach third place, Inter achieved fourth. The side collected 67 points, for the best result of the last five years.

== Kit Information ==
Supplier: Nike / Sponsor: Pirelli

Home	Home alt.	Away	Third
Goalkeeper 1	Goalkeeper 2	Goalkeeper 3

== Players ==
=== Squad information ===
As of 29 January 2016

Squad no.	Name	Nationality	Position	Date of birth (age)
Goalkeepers
1	Samir Handanović	(Slovenia)	GK	14 July 1984 (aged 31)
18	Juan Pablo Carrizo	(Argentina)	GK	6 May 1984 (aged 32)
46	Tommaso Berni HG	(Italy)	GK	6 March 1983 (aged 33)
Defenders
5	Juan Jesus	(Brazil)	LB/CB	10 June 1991 (aged 25)
12	Alex Telles (on loan from Galatasaray)	(Brazil)	LB	15 December 1992 (aged 23)
21	Davide Santon HG	(Italy)	RB/LB	2 January 1991 (aged 25)
24	Jeison Murillo	(Colombia)	CB	27 May 1992 (aged 24)
25	Miranda	(Brazil)	CB	7 September 1984 (aged 31)
33	Danilo D'Ambrosio HG	(Italy)	RB/LB	9 September 1988 (aged 27)
55	Yuto Nagatomo	(Japan)	RB/LB	12 September 1986 (aged 29)
Midfielders
7	Geoffrey Kondogbia	(France)	DM/CM	15 February 1993 (aged 23)
17	Gary Medel	(Chile)	DM/CB	3 August 1987 (aged 28)
22	Adem Ljajić HG (on loan from Roma)	(Serbia)	LW/AM	29 September 1991 (aged 24)
77	Marcelo Brozović (on loan from Dinamo Zagreb)	(Croatia)	CM/AM	16 November 1992 (aged 23)
83	Felipe Melo	(Brazil)	DM/CM	26 June 1983 (aged 33)
Forwards
8	Rodrigo Palacio	(Argentina)	FW	5 February 1982 (aged 34)
9	Mauro Icardi HG (Captain)	(Argentina)	FW	19 February 1993 (aged 23)
10	Stevan Jovetić HG (on loan from Manchester City)	(Montenegro)	FW	2 November 1989 (aged 26)
11	Jonathan Biabiany HG	(France)	LW/RW	28 April 1988 (aged 28)
23	Éder (on loan from Sampdoria)	(Italy)	FW	15 November 1986 (aged 29)
44	Ivan Perišić	(Croatia)	LW/RW	2 February 1989 (aged 27)

HG Player formed at country

=== Youth team players added to the first squad ===
Note: Flags indicate national team as defined under FIFA eligibility rules; some limited exceptions apply. Players may hold more than one non-FIFA nationality.

No.	Pos.	Nation	Player
19	MF	POR	Pedro Delgado
27	MF	CIV	Assane Gnoukouri
31	MF	ITA	Enrico De Micheli
56	DF	ROU	Răzvan Popa
92	FW	ITA	Enrico Baldini
97	FW	ALB	Rey Manaj
98	GK	ROU	Ionuț Radu
99	FW	GNB	Zé Turbo

== Transfers ==
=== In ===
No.	Pos.	Nat.	Name	Age	EU	Moving from	Type	Transfer window	Ends	Transfer fee	Source
16	MF	(France)	Geoffrey Kondogbia	22	EU	(France) Monaco	Transfer	Summer	2020	€29,000,000	Inter.it
25	CB	(Brazil)	Miranda	30	Non-EU	(Spain) Atlético Madrid	Loan	Summer	2018	€3,000,000	Inter.it
24	CB	(Colombia)	Jeison Murillo	23	EU	(Spain) Granada	Transfer	Summer	2020	€8,000,000	Inter.it
	CB	(Italy)	Matteo Bianchetti	22	EU	(Italy) Verona	Co-ownership settlement	Summer		undisclosed	Inter.it
14	RB	(Spain)	Martín Montoya	24	EU	(Spain) Barcelona	Loan	Summer	2016	€1,000,000	Inter.it
11	FW	(France)	Jonathan Biabiany	27	EU	Unattached	Free	Summer	2019	Free	Inter.it
19	CM	(Algeria)	Saphir Taïder	23	EU	(Italy) Sassuolo	Loan Return	Summer	2017	N/A	
12	FW	(Italy)	Samuele Longo	23	EU	(Italy) Cagliari	Loan Return	Summer	2017	N/A	
	GK	(Italy)	Francesco Bardi	23	EU	(Italy) Chievo	Loan Return	Summer	2017	N/A	
	CM	(Slovenia)	Rene Krhin	25	EU	(Spain) Córdoba	Loan Return	Summer	2016	N/A	
7	RW	(Italy)	Ezequiel Schelotto	26	EU	(Italy) Chievo	Loan Return	Summer	2017	N/A	
11	FW	(Montenegro)	Stevan Jovetić	25	Non-EU	(England) Manchester City	Loan	Summer	2017	€3,000,000	Inter.it
22	LW	(Serbia)	Adem Ljajić	23	Non-EU	(Italy) Roma	Loan	Summer	2016	€1,750,000	Inter.it
5	DM	(Brazil)	Felipe Melo	31	EU	(Turkey) Galatasaray	Transfer	Summer	2019	€3,700,000 + Bonus	Inter.it
12	LB	(Brazil)	Alex Telles	22	EU	(Turkey) Galatasaray	Loan	Summer	2016	€1,300,000 + Bonus	Inter.it
44	LW	(Croatia)	Ivan Perišić	26	EU	(Germany) VfL Wolfsburg	Transfer	Summer	2020	€16,000,000	
23	ST	(Italy)	Éder	28	EU	(Italy) Sampdoria	Loan	Winter	2020		

To add: €16,000,000 for the full purchase of Xherdan Shaqiri from Bayern Munich and €3,500,000 for the full purchase of Davide Santon from Newcastle United.

Total Spending : €85,250,000

=== Out ===
No.	Pos.	Nat.	Name	Age	EU	Moving to	Type	Transfer window	Transfer fee	Source
11	FW	(Germany)	Lukas Podolski	30	EU	(England) Arsenal	End of loan	Summer	Free	ESPNFC.US
97	FW	(Italy)	Federico Bonazzoli	18	EU	(Italy) Sampdoria	End of loan	Summer	Free	
17	MF	(Serbia)	Zdravko Kuzmanović	27	EU	(Switzerland) Basel	Transfer	Summer	€2,000,000	fcb.ch
14	CB	(Argentina)	Hugo Campagnaro	35	EU	(Italy) Pescara	End of contract	Summer	Free	
26	CB	(Brazil)	Felipe	31	EU	(Italy) Udinese	End of contract	Summer	Free	
2	RB	(Brazil)	Jonathan	29	EU	(Brazil) Fluminense	End of contract	Summer	Free	
N/A	MF	(Italy)	Marco Benassi	20	EU	(Italy) Torino	Co-ownership settlement	Summer	€3,500,000	Inter.it
N/A	CB	(Italy)	Matteo Bianchetti	22	EU	(Italy) Verona	Transfer	Summer	€1,000,000	Inter.it
20	MF	(Nigeria)	Joel Obi	24	EU	(Italy) Torino	Transfer	Summer	€2,400,000	inter.it
N/A	AM	(Argentina)	Rubén Botta	25	EU	(Mexico) Pachuca	Transfer	Summer	€2,700,000	Inter.it
54	CB	(Ghana)	Isaac Donkor	20	Non-EU	(Italy) Bari	Loan	Summer	loan	Inter.it
N/A	CM	(Slovenia)	Rene Krhin	25	EU	(Spain) Granada CF	Transfer	Summer	€1,300,000	
N/A	GK	(Italy)	Francesco Bardi	23	EU	(Spain) Espanyol	Loan	Summer	loan	
29	MF	(Guinea)	Gaston Camara	19	Non-EU	(Italy) Bari	Loan	Summer	loan	
28	FW	(Romania)	George Pușcaș	19	EU	(Italy) Bari	Loan	Summer	loan	
12	FW	(Italy)	Samuele Longo	23	EU	(Italy) Frosinone	Loan	Summer	N/A	
N/A	MF	(Italy)	Lorenzo Crisetig	22	EU	(Italy) Bologna	Loan	Summer	€1,800,000	bolognafc.it
91	FW	(Switzerland)	Xherdan Shaqiri	23	Non-EU	(England) Stoke City	Transfer	Summer	€17,000,000	
19	CM	(Algeria)	Saphir Taïder	23	EU	(Italy) Bologna	Transfer	Summer	€4,000,000	
88	MF	(Brazil)	Hernanes	30	Non-EU	(Italy) Juventus	Transfer	Summer	€11,000,000	
6	CB	(Italy)	Marco Andreolli	29	EU	(Spain) Sevilla	Loan	Summer	N/A	
16	RW	(Italy)	Ezequiel Schelotto	26	EU	N/A	End of contract	Summer	Free	
10	CM	(Croatia)	Mateo Kovačić	21	EU	(Spain) Real Madrid	Transfer	Summer	€35,000,000	
15	CB	(Serbia)	Nemanja Vidić	34	Non-EU	N/A	End of contract	Winter	Free	
26	FW	(Italy)	Vincenzo Tommasone	20	EU	(Italy) Paganese	Loan	Winter		
13	MF	(Colombia)	Fredy Guarín	29	Non-EU	(China) Shanghai Greenland Shenhua	Transfer	Winter	€14,000,000	
23	CB	(Italy)	Andrea Ranocchia	27	EU	(Italy) Sampdoria	Loan	Winter		
6	LB	(Brazil)	Dodô	23	EU	(Italy) Sampdoria	Loan	Winter		
14	RB	(Spain)	Martín Montoya	24	EU	(Spain) Real Betis	End of Loan	Winter		
N/A	GK	(Italy)	Francesco Bardi	23	EU	(Italy) Frosinone	Loan	Winter	loan	

To add: €3,500,000 from Bologna for Ibrahima Mbaye; €2,600,000 from Sampdoria for Alfred Duncan; €400,000 from Sturm Graz for Lukas Spendlhofer; €200,000 from Alessandria for Riccardo Bocalon. No fee was paid by Sampdoria for Matías Silvestre: his agreement with Inter was terminated and he joined on a free transfer. Sunderland owes Inter €11,000,000 for Ricky Álvarez, but the case has to be discussed at FIFA, as both teams recurred on appeal. In winter, Inter also received €3,700,000 from Estudiantes La Plata for Álvaro Pereira.

Total income: €104,100,000

Total expenditure: ▲€18,850,000

== Technical staff ==
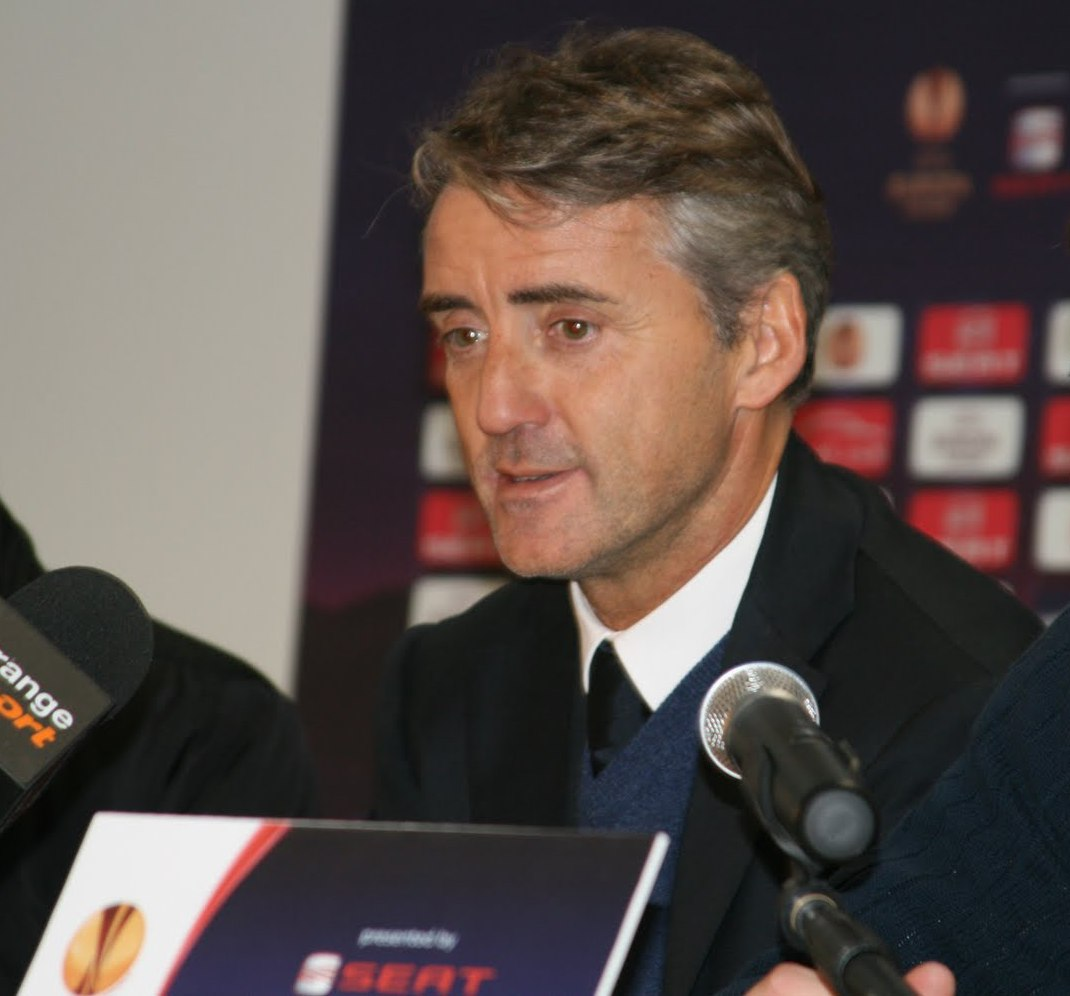
Roberto Mancini

As of 20 June 2015

Position	Name
Head coach	Roberto Mancini
First Team Club Manager	Dejan Stanković
Assistant coach	Giulio Nuciari
Technical Assistant	Sylvinho
Technical Assistant	Fausto Salsano
Technical Assistant	José Duque
Goalkeeping coach	Adriano Bonaiuti
Match analyst	Michele Salzarulo
Chief of Medical Staff	Piero Volpi
Doctor	Daniele Casalini
Doctor	Simone Porcelli
Head Fitness Coach	Ivan Carminati
Fitness coach	Andrea Scanavino
Rehabilitation Coach Responsible	Giannicola Bisciotti
Rehabilitation Coach	Massimiliano Marchesi
Chief of physiotherapists	Marco Dellacasa
Physiotherapist	Massimo Dellacasa
Physiotherapist	Andrea Belli
Physiotherapist	Marco Frigerio
Physiotherapist	Matteo Perasso

== Pre-season and friendlies ==
=== Riscone di Brunico training camp ===
11 July 2015 Friendly	Internazionale	4–3	Stuttgarter Kickers	Bruneck
17:00 CEST (UTC+02:00)	Palacio 3', 10'; Brozović 23'; Icardi 29'	Report	Fischer 54', 85'; Ivan 90'	Stadium: Riscone di Brunico; Referee: Daniele Perenzoni (Italy)

15 July 2015 Friendly	Internazionale	4–2	Carpi	Bruneck
18:00 CEST (UTC+02:00)	Palacio 4'; Icardi 24'; Hernanes 33'; Longo 48'		Lasagna 22'; Matos 69'	Stadium: Riscone di Brunico; Referee: Daniele Chiffi (Italy)

=== Audi Football Summit ===
21 July 2015 Friendly	Internazionale	0–1	Bayern Munich	Shanghai, China
20:00 CST (UTC+08:00)		Report	Götze 80'	Stadium: Shanghai Stadium; Referee: Shi Zhenlu (China)

=== International Champions Cup ===
25 July 2015 ICC	Milan	1–0	Internazionale	Shenzhen, China
20:00 CST (UTC+08:00)	Mexès 62'	Report		Stadium: Shenzhen Universiade Sports Centre; Attendance: 38,497; Referee: Tan Hai (China)

27 July 2015 ICC	Internazionale	0–3	Real Madrid	Guangzhou, China
20:00 CST (UTC+08:00)		Report	Jesé 29'; Varane 56'; Rodríguez 88'	Stadium: Tianhe Stadium; Attendance: 39,896; Referee: Fu Ming (China)

=== TIM Trophy ===
12 August 2015 TIM Trophy	Milan	2–1	Internazionale	Reggio Emilia
20:45 CEST (UTC+02:00)	Bertolacci 5'; Bacca 23'	Report	Brozović 31'	Stadium: Mapei Stadium – Città del Tricolore; Referee: Andrea Gervasoni

12 August 2015 TIM Trophy	Internazionale	0–1	Sassuolo	Reggio Emilia
21:45 CEST (UTC+02:00)		Report	Defrel 23'	Stadium: Mapei Stadium – Città del Tricolore; Referee: Marco Di Bello

=== Trofeo Luigi Berlusconi ===
21 October 2015 Berlusconi Trophy	Milan	0–1	Internazionale	Milan
18:00 CST (UTC+08:00)		Report	Kondogbia 12'	Stadium: San Siro; Referee: Marco Di Bello

=== Trofeo San Nicola ===
24 November 2015 San Nicola Trophy	Internazionale	2–0	Bari	Bari
20:00 CET (UTC+02:00)	Manaj 31'; Guarín 36'	Report		Stadium: Stadio San Nicola; Attendance: 19,629; Referee: Angelo Cervellera

24 November 2015 San Nicola Trophy	Milan	1–0	Internazionale	Bari
21:00 CET (UTC+02:00)	Poli 15'	Report		Stadium: Stadio San Nicola; Attendance: 19,623; Referee: Domenico Celi

=== Other friendlies ===
2 August 2015 Friendly	Galatasaray	1–0	Internazionale	Istanbul, Turkey
19:00 CEST (UTC+02:00)	Sneijder 54'	Report		Stadium: Türk Telekom Arena

5 August 2015 Friendly	Internazionale	1–1	Al Ahly SC	Bruneck
18:00 CEST (UTC+02:00)	Jovetić 89' (pen.)		4' Lima	Stadium: Riscone di Brunico; Referee: Romeo

8 August 2015 Friendly	Internazionale	2–0	Athletic Bilbao	Parma, Italy
21:00 CEST (UTC+02:00)	Jovetić 27'; Icardi 84'	Report		Stadium: Stadio Ennio Tardini

16 August 2015 Friendly	Internazionale	0–0	AEK Athens	Ancona, Italy
21:00 CEST (UTC+02:00)		Report		Stadium: Stadio del Conero; Referee: Sebastiano Peruzzo

30 December 2015 Friendly	Paris Saint-Germain	1–0	Internazionale	Doha, Qatar
17:30 CET (UTC+01:00)	Augustin 45'			Stadium: Jassim Bin Hamad Stadium; Referee: Khamis Al-Marri

== Competitions ==
=== Overview ===
Competition	First match	Last match	Starting round	Final position	Record							
Competition	First match	Last match	Starting round	Final position	Pld	W	D	L	GF	GA	GD	Win %
Serie A	23 August 2015	15 May 2016	Matchday 1	4th	38	20	7	11	50	38	+12	52.63
Coppa Italia	15 December 2015	2 March 2016	Round of 16	Semi-finals	4	3	0	1	8	3	+5	75.00
Total					42	23	7	12	58	41	+17	54.76

Source: Serie A statistics, Coppa Italia statistics

=== Serie A ===
==== League table ====
Pos	Team	Pld	W	D	L	GF	GA	GD	Pts	Qualification or relegation
2	Napoli	38	25	7	6	80	32	+48	82	Qualification to Champions League group stage
3	Roma	38	23	11	4	83	41	+42	80	Qualification to Champions League play-off round
4	Internazionale	38	20	7	11	50	38	+12	67	Qualification to Europa League group stage (Note: Since the winners of the 2015–16 Coppa Italia, Juventus, qualified for European competition based on league position, the spot awarded to the cup winners (Europa League group stage) was passed to fifth-placed team and the spot awarded to the fifth-placed team (Europa League third qualifying round) was passed to the sixth-placed team.)
5	Fiorentina	38	18	10	10	60	42	+18	64	Qualification to Europa League group stage
6	Sassuolo	38	16	13	9	49	40	+9	61	Qualification to Europa League third qualifying round

Source: Serie A, Soccerway
Rules for classification: 1) Points; 2) Head-to-head points; 3) Head-to-head goal difference; 4) Goal difference; 5) Goals scored; 6) Draw.

==== Results summary ====
Overall								Home						Away					
Pld	W	D	L	GF	GA	GD	Pts	W	D	L	GF	GA	GD	W	D	L	GF	GA	GD
38	20	7	11	50	38	+12	67	13	2	4	29	15	+14	7	5	7	21	23	−2

Source: Competitive matches

==== Results by round ====
Round	1	2	3	4	5	6	7	8	9	10	11	12	13	14	15	16	17	18	19	20	21	22	23	24	25	26	27	28	29	30	31	32	33	34	35	36	37	38
Ground	H	A	H	A	H	H	A	H	A	A	H	A	H	A	H	A	H	A	H	A	H	A	H	A	A	H	A	H	H	A	H	A	H	A	H	A	H	A
Result	W	W	W	W	W	L	D	D	D	W	W	W	W	L	W	W	L	W	L	D	D	L	W	D	L	W	L	W	W	D	L	W	W	L	W	L	W	L
Position	7	3	1	1	1	2	2	3	4	4	2	2	1	2	1	1	1	1	3	3	4	4	4	4	5	5	5	5	5	5	5	4	4	4	4	4	4	4

Source: Competitive matches
A = Away; H = Home; W = Win; D = Draw; L = Loss

==== Matches ====
23 August 2015 1	Internazionale	1–0	Atalanta	Milan
20:45 CEST (UTC+02:00)	Palacio (yellow card) 36'; Jovetić 90+3'; Manaj (yellow card) 90+5'	Report	Moralez (yellow card) 46'; Carmona (yellow card) 66' (yellow-red card) 71'; Pinilla (yellow card) 82'	Stadium: San Siro; Attendance: 37,042; Referee: Gianpaolo Calvarese

30 August 2015 2	Carpi	1–2	Internazionale	Modena
20:45 CEST (UTC+02:00)	Lollo (yellow card) 20'; Letizia (yellow card) 70'; Di Gaudio 81'; Gabriel Silva (yellow card) 88'	Report	Jovetić 31', 89' (pen.); Santon (yellow card) 60'; Medel (yellow card) 65'; Handanović (yellow card) 90+2'	Stadium: Stadio Alberto Braglia; Attendance: 10,591; Referee: Davide Massa

13 September 2015 3	Internazionale	1–0	Milan	Milan
20:45 CEST (UTC+02:00)	Juan Jesus (yellow card) 37'; Guarín 58'; Felipe Melo (yellow card) 63'	Report	Abate (yellow card) 22'; Honda (yellow card) 42'; Kucka (yellow card) 66'	Stadium: San Siro; Attendance: 79,154; Referee: Gianluca Rocchi

20 September 2015 4	Chievo	0–1	Internazionale	Verona
12:30 CEST (UTC+02:00)	Rigoni (yellow card) 37'; Meggiorini (yellow card) 40'; M'Poku (yellow card) 90+4'	Report	Guarín (yellow card) 27'; Icardi 42'	Stadium: Stadio Marc'Antonio Bentegodi; Attendance: 20,000; Referee: Paolo Tagliavento

23 September 2015 5	Internazionale	1–0	Hellas Verona	Milan
20:45 CEST (UTC+02:00)	Guarín (yellow card) 3'; Kondogbia (yellow card) 37'; Felipe Melo 56', (yellow card) 90+1'; Biabiany (yellow card) 90+3'	Report	Albertazzi (yellow card) 9'; Sala (yellow card) 61'; Greco (yellow card) 65'; Helander (yellow card) 82'	Stadium: San Siro; Attendance: 34,548; Referee: Carmine Russo

27 September 2015 6	Internazionale	1–4	Fiorentina	Milan
20:45 CEST (UTC+02:00)	Handanović (yellow card) 3'; Miranda (red card) 31'; Kondogbia (yellow card) 40'; Guarín (yellow card) 43'; Icardi 60'; Medel (yellow card) 81'	Report	Iličić 4' (pen.); Kalinić 18', 23', 76'; Alonso (yellow card) 90'	Stadium: San Siro; Attendance: 42,687; Referee: Antonio Damato

4 October 2015 7	Sampdoria	1–1	Internazionale	Genoa
15:00 CEST (UTC+02:00)	Muriel 51'; Barreto (yellow card) 64'; Fernando (yellow card) 81'	Report	Perišić (yellow card) 68', (goal) 76'; Felipe Melo (yellow card) 80'; Medel (yellow card) 82'; Guarín (yellow card) 90+4'	Stadium: Stadio Luigi Ferraris; Attendance: 24,329; Referee: Gianluca Rocchi

18 October 2015 8	Internazionale	0–0	Juventus	Milan
20:45 CEST (UTC+02:00)	Felipe Melo (yellow card) 8'; Brozović (yellow card) 78'; Miranda (yellow card) 90+1'	Report	Marchisio (yellow card) 7'; Khedira (yellow card) 11'; Zaza (yellow card) 16'; Evra (yellow card) 60'; Chiellini (yellow card) 86'	Stadium: San Siro; Attendance: 79,154; Referee: Paolo Valeri

24 October 2015 9	Palermo	1–1	Internazionale	Palermo
20:45 CEST (UTC+02:00)	Vázquez (yellow card) 38'; Maresca (yellow card) 49'; Gilardino 66', (yellow card) 85'	Report	Murillo (yellow card) 27' (yellow-red card) 79'; Kondogbia (yellow card) 31'; Perišić 60'	Stadium: Stadio Renzo Barbera; Attendance: 20,626; Referee: Daniele Doveri

27 October 2015 10	Bologna	0–1	Internazionale	Bologna
20:45 CET (UTC+01:00)	Rossettini (yellow card) 87'	Report	Kondogbia (yellow card) 39'; Felipe Melo (yellow card) 53' (yellow-red card) 60'; Icardi 67'	Stadium: Stadio Renato Dall'Ara; Attendance: 22,350; Referee: Luca Banti

31 October 2015 11	Internazionale	1–0	Roma	Milan
20:45 CET (UTC+01:00)	Medel 31'; Guarín (yellow card) 59'; Handanović (yellow card) 70'; Palacio (yellow card) 77'; Ljajić (yellow card) 90+1'	Report	Pjanić (yellow card) 41' (yellow-red card) 73'; Digne (yellow card) 90+4'	Stadium: San Siro; Attendance: 59,213; Referee: Nicola Rizzoli

8 November 2015 12	Torino	0–1	Internazionale	Turin
12:30 CET (UTC+01:00)	Glik (yellow card) 31'; Peres (yellow card) 74'	Report	Kondogbia 31'; Medel (yellow card) 63'	Stadium: Stadio Olimpico di Torino; Attendance: 25,868; Referee: Massimiliano Irrati

22 November 2015 13	Internazionale	4–0	Frosinone	Milan
20:45 CET (UTC+01:00)	Miranda (yellow card) 26'; Biabiany 29'; Icardi 53'; Murillo 87'; Brozović 90+2'	Report	Diakité (yellow card) 10'; Soddimo (yellow card) 40'; Paganini (yellow card) 62'	Stadium: San Siro; Attendance: 37,469; Referee: Marco Guida

30 November 2015 14	Napoli	2–1	Internazionale	Naples
21:00 CET (UTC+01:00)	Higuaín 2', 62'; Koulibaly (yellow card) 11'; Hysaj (yellow card) 36'; Allan (yellow card) 52'; Callejón (yellow card) 84'	Report	Nagatomo (yellow card) 35' (yellow-red card) 44'; Guarín (yellow card) 52'; Ljajić 67'	Stadium: Stadio San Paolo; Attendance: 54,149; Referee: Daniele Orsato

5 December 2015 15	Internazionale	1–0	Genoa	Milan
20:45 CET (UTC+01:00)	Ljajić 59'; D'Ambrosio (yellow card) 69' (yellow-red card) 86'; Telles (yellow card) 82'	Report	Costa (yellow card) 29'; Ansaldi (yellow card) 89'; Perotti (yellow card) 90+1'	Stadium: San Siro; Attendance: 39,485; Referee: Piero Giacomelli

12 December 2015 16	Udinese	0–4	Internazionale	Udine
20:45 CET (UTC+01:00)	Fernandes (yellow card) 52'; Domizzi (yellow card) 66'; Marquinho (yellow card) 89'	Report	Perišić (yellow card) 8'; Telles (yellow card) 15'; Ljajić (yellow card) 21'; Icardi 23', 84'; Jovetić 31'; Brozović 87'	Stadium: Stadio Friuli; Attendance: 16,780; Referee: Davide Massa

20 December 2015 17	Internazionale	1–2	Lazio	Milan
20:45 CET (UTC+01:00)	Biabiany (yellow card) 55'; Icardi 61'; Felipe Melo (red card) 90'	Report	Candreva 5', 87', (yellow card) 90+2'; Biglia (yellow card) 49'; Milinković-Savić (yellow card) 65' (yellow-red card) 90+3'	Stadium: San Siro; Attendance: 46,260; Referee: Paolo Mazzoleni

6 January 2016 18	Empoli	0–1	Internazionale	Empoli
18:00 CET (UTC+01:00)	Paredes (yellow card) 26'; Croce (yellow card) 68'	Report	Murillo (yellow card) 16'; Brozović (yellow card) 35'; Icardi 45+1'	Stadium: Stadio Carlo Castellani; Attendance: 13,735; Referee: Domenico Celi

10 January 2016 19	Internazionale	0–1	Sassuolo	Milan
12:30 CET (UTC+01:00)	Murillo (yellow card) 34'; Miranda (yellow card) 90+4'; D'Ambrosio (yellow card) 90+5'	Report	Cannavaro (yellow card) 67'; Magnanelli (yellow card) 82'; Berardi 90+5' (pen.), (yellow card) 90+5'	Stadium: San Siro; Attendance: 40,322; Referee: Daniele Doveri

16 January 2016 20	Atalanta	1–1	Internazionale	Bergamo
15:00 CET (UTC+01:00)	Toloi (yellow card) 14'; Murillo 17' (o.g.); Gómez (yellow card) 40'; Monachello (yellow card) 51'; Cigarini (yellow card) 90+3'	Report	Toloi 25' (o.g.); Jovetić (yellow card) 36'; Guarín (yellow card) 44'; Brozović (yellow card) 53'; D'Ambrosio (yellow card) 62'; Biabiany (yellow card) 82'	Stadium: Stadio Atleti Azzurri d'Italia; Attendance: 19,274; Referee: Nicola Rizzoli

24 January 2016 21	Internazionale	1–1	Carpi	Milan
15:00 CET (UTC+01:00)	Telles (yellow card) 20'; Palacio 39', (yellow card) 63'; Jovetić (yellow card) 88'	Report	Crimi (yellow card) 23'; Pasciuti (yellow card) 40' (yellow-red card) 83'; Daprelà (yellow card) 63'; Suagher (yellow card) 79'; Lasagna 90+2'	Stadium: San Siro; Attendance: 35,826; Referee: Andrea Gervasoni

31 January 2016 22	Milan	3–0	Internazionale	Milan
20:45 CET (UTC+01:00)	Alex 35', (yellow card) 58'; Kucka (yellow card) 65'; Bacca 73'; Niang 77'; Balotelli (yellow card) 80'	Report	Jovetić (yellow card) 45+1'	Stadium: San Siro; Attendance: 77,043; Referee: Antonio Damato

3 February 2016 23	Internazionale	1–0	Chievo	Milan
20:45 CET (UTC+01:00)	Icardi 48'; Éder (yellow card) 53'; Miranda (yellow card) 59'; Nagatomo (yellow card) 74'	Report	Rigoni (yellow card) 5'; Pellissier (yellow card) 30'; Spolli (yellow card) 71'; Inglese (yellow card) 72'; Castro (yellow card) 75'	Stadium: San Siro; Attendance: 31,494; Referee: Paolo Valeri

7 February 2016 24	Hellas Verona	3–3	Internazionale	Verona
12:30 CET (UTC+01:00)	Helander 13'; Pisano 16'; Wszołek (yellow card) 36'; Ioniță 57'; Fares (yellow card) 60'; Marrone (yellow card) 83'	Report	Murillo 8'; Felipe Melo (yellow card) 31'; Icardi 61'; Telles (yellow card) 77'; Perišić 78'	Stadium: Stadio Marc'Antonio Bentegodi; Attendance: 21,104; Referee: Piero Giacomelli

14 February 2016 25	Fiorentina	2–1	Internazionale	Florence
20:45 CET (UTC+01:00)	Alonso (yellow card) 47'; Valero 60'; Kalinić (yellow card) 75'; Babacar 90+1'; Zárate (red card) 90+5'	Report	Telles (yellow card) 11' (yellow-red card) 82'; Medel (yellow card) 11'; Brozović 26', (yellow card) 68'; Icardi (yellow card) 28'; Palacio (yellow card) 76'; Kondogbia (red card) 90+6'	Stadium: Stadio Artemio Franchi; Attendance: 30,486; Referee: Paolo Mazzoleni

20 February 2016 26	Internazionale	3–1	Sampdoria	Milan
20:45 CET (UTC+01:00)	D'Ambrosio 23'; Brozović (yellow card) 42'; Miranda (yellow card) 50', (goal) 57'; Nagatomo (yellow card) 72'; Icardi 73'	Report	Ranocchia (yellow card) 18'; Dodô (yellow card) 33'; Quagliarella 90+2'	Stadium: San Siro; Attendance: 39,055; Referee: Davide Massa

28 February 2016 27	Juventus	2–0	Internazionale	Turin
20:45 CET (UTC+01:00)	Lichtsteiner (yellow card) 39'; Hernanes (yellow card) 45'; Bonucci 47'; Khedira (yellow card) 59'; Morata 84' (pen.)	Report	Juan Jesus (yellow card) 58'	Stadium: Juventus Stadium; Attendance: 40,204; Referee: Gianluca Rocchi

6 March 2016 28	Internazionale	3–1	Palermo	Milan
20:45 CET (UTC+01:00)	Ljajić 11'; Icardi 23'; Perišić 54'; Medel (yellow card) 58'	Report	Vázquez 45'; González (yellow card) 70'	Stadium: San Siro; Attendance: 32,455; Referee: Carmine Russo

12 March 2016 29	Internazionale	2–1	Bologna	Milan
20:45 CET (UTC+01:00)	Medel (yellow card) 56'; Perišić 72'; D'Ambrosio 76'; Palacio (yellow card) 90+3'	Report	Brienza 90'	Stadium: San Siro; Attendance: 40,267; Referee: Gianpaolo Calvarese

19 March 2016 30	Roma	1–1	Internazionale	Rome
20:45 CET (UTC+01:00)	Keita (yellow card) 22'; Nainggolan 84'; Manolas (yellow card) 88'	Report	Perišić 53'; Medel (yellow card) 62'; Handanović (yellow card) 75'	Stadium: Stadio Olimpico; Attendance: 47,049; Referee: Daniele Orsato

3 April 2016 31	Internazionale	1–2	Torino	Milan
20:45 CEST (UTC+02:00)	Icardi 17' (pen.); Miranda (yellow card) 19' (yellow-red card) 57'; Medel (yellow card) 42'; Nagatomo (red card) 72'	Report	Moretti (yellow card) 17'; Vives (yellow card) 29'; Molinaro 55', (yellow card) 88'; Belotti 73' (pen.), (yellow card) 90'; Peres (yellow card) 82'	Stadium: San Siro; Attendance: 39,125; Referee: Marco Guida

9 April 2016 32	Frosinone	0–1	Internazionale	Frosinone
15:00 CET (UTC+01:00)	Gucher (yellow card) 23'; Frara (yellow card) 29'; Kragl (yellow card) 34'; Ajeti (yellow card) 50'; Pavlović (yellow card) 58'; Blanchard (yellow card) 63' (yellow-red card) 80'	Report	D'Ambrosio (yellow card) 32'; Felipe Melo (yellow card) 71'; Icardi 74'	Stadium: Stadio Matusa; Attendance: 7,954; Referee: Paolo Tagliavento

16 April 2016 33	Internazionale	2–0	Napoli	Milan
20:45 CEST (UTC+02:00)	Icardi 4'; Nagatomo (yellow card) 14'; Murillo (yellow card) 33'; Perišić (yellow card) 42'; Brozović 44'; Kondogbia (yellow card) 62'	Report	Jorginho (yellow card) 22'; Albiol (yellow card) 55'	Stadium: San Siro; Attendance: 59,310; Referee: Gianluca Rocchi

20 April 2016 34	Genoa	1–0	Internazionale	Genoa
20:45 CEST (UTC+02:00)	Muñoz (yellow card) 56'; De Maio 77'; Tachtsidis (yellow card) 80'	Report	Medel (yellow card) 80'; Brozović (yellow card) 88'	Stadium: Stadio Luigi Ferraris; Attendance: 22,781; Referee: Massimiliano Irrati

23 April 2016 35	Internazionale	3–1	Udinese	Milan
20:45 CEST (UTC+02:00)	Jovetić (yellow card) 31', (goal) 36', 75'; Kondogbia (yellow card) 65'; Perišić (yellow card) 82'; Éder 90+5'	Report	Théréau 9'; Danilo (yellow card) 61'; Zapata (yellow card) 86'	Stadium: San Siro; Attendance: 48,012; Referee: Domenico Celi

1 May 2016 36	Lazio	2–0	Internazionale	Rome
20:45 CEST (UTC+02:00)	Klose 8', (yellow card) 64'; Gentiletti (yellow card) 13'; Keita (yellow card) 52'; Lulić (yellow card) 68'; Candreva 84' (pen.), (yellow card) 85'	Report	Murillo (yellow card) 81' (yellow-red card) 83'	Stadium: Stadio Olimpico; Attendance: 20,000; Referee: Luca Banti

7 May 2016 37	Internazionale	2–1	Empoli	Milan
18:00 CEST (UTC+02:00)	Iacardi 12'; Perišić 40', (yellow card) 88'; Nagatomo (yellow card) 50'; Handanović (yellow card) 87'	Report	Büchel (yellow card) 21'; Pucciarelli 37'	Stadium: San Siro; Attendance: 44,348; Referee: Marco Di Bello

15 May 2016 38	Sassuolo	3–1	Internazionale	Reggio Emilia
15:00 CEST (UTC+02:00)	Politano 6', 39'; Pellegrini 26'; Magnanelli (yellow card) 31'; Duncan (yellow card) 66'; Cannavaro (yellow card) 85'	Report	Telles (yellow card) 22'; Palacio 32'; Brozović (yellow card) 55'; Murillo (yellow card) 59' (yellow-red card) 60'; Juan Jesus (yellow card) 66'	Stadium: Mapei Stadium – Città del Tricolore; Attendance: 14,213; Referee: Andrea Gervasoni

=== Coppa Italia ===
15 December 2015 Round of 16	Internazionale	3–0	Cagliari	Milan
21:00 CET (UTC+01:00)	Brozović (yellow card) 15', (goal) 71'; Palacio 24'; Medel (yellow card) 38'; Perišić 81'	Report	Deiola (yellow card) 49'; Colombatto (yellow card) 85'	Stadium: San Siro; Attendance: 17,102; Referee: Carmine Russo

19 January 2016 Quarter-finals	Napoli	0–2	Internazionale	Naples
20:45 CET (UTC+01:00)	Valdifiori (yellow card) 71'; Mertens (yellow card) 79' (yellow-red card) 88'; Higuaín (yellow card) 80'	Report	Miranda (yellow card) 47'; Jovetić 74'; Ljajić 90+2'	Stadium: Stadio San Paolo; Attendance: 25,968; Referee: Paolo Valeri

27 January 2016 Semi-finals; First leg	Juventus	3–0	Internazionale	Turin
20:45 CET (UTC+01:00)	Bonucci (yellow card) 18'; Morata 36' (pen.), 64'; Dybala 84'	Report	Murillo (yellow card) 34' (yellow-red card) 70'; Miranda (yellow card) 45+1'; Kondogbia (yellow card) 89'	Stadium: Juventus Stadium; Attendance: 39,441; Referee: Paolo Tagliavento

2 March 2016 Semi-finals; Second leg	Internazionale	3–0 (a.e.t.) (3–3 agg.) (3–5 p)	Juventus	Milan
20:45 CET (UTC+01:00)	Brozović 17', 82' (pen.); Juan Jesus (yellow card) 24'; Perišić 49', (yellow card) 90+2'; D'Ambrosio (yellow card) 90+1'; Éder (yellow card) 102'; Santon (yellow card) 106'	Report	Sturaro (yellow card) 37'; Bonucci (yellow card) 41'; Cuadrado (yellow card) 90+2'; Lemina (yellow card) 93'; Pogba (yellow card) 98'; Zaza (yellow card) 109'	Stadium: San Siro; Attendance: 29,357; Referee: Andrea Gervasoni
	Penalties
	Brozović (penalty scored); Palacio (penalty missed); Manaj (penalty scored); Nagatomo (penalty scored)		(penalty scored) Barzagli; (penalty scored) Zaza; (penalty scored) Morata; (penalty scored) Pogba; (penalty scored) Bonucci

== Statistics ==
=== Appearances and goals ===
No.	Pos	Nat	Player	Total		Serie A		Coppa Italia	
No.	Pos	Nat	Player	Apps	Goals	Apps	Goals	Apps	Goals
Goalkeepers
1	GK	(Slovenia) SVN	Samir Handanović	38	0	36	0	2	0
30	GK	(Argentina) ARG	Juan Pablo Carrizo	4	0	2	0	2	0
46	GK	(Italy) ITA	Tommaso Berni	0	0	0	0	0	0
98	GK	(Romania) ROU	Ionuț Radu	1	0	0+1	0	0	0
Defenders
5	DF	(Brazil) BRA	Juan Jesus	23	0	16+3	0	3+1	0
12	DF	(Brazil) BRA	Alex Telles	22	0	18+3	0	1	0
21	DF	(Italy) ITA	Davide Santon	13	0	11+1	0	1	0
24	DF	(Colombia) COL	Jeison Murillo	35	2	32+2	2	1	0
25	DF	(Brazil) BRA	Miranda	34	1	31+1	1	2	0
28	DF	(Italy) ITA	Fabio Della Giovanna	1	0	0+1	0	0	0
33	DF	(Italy) ITA	Danilo D'Ambrosio	24	2	18+3	2	3	0
55	DF	(Japan) JPN	Yuto Nagatomo	26	0	19+3	0	4	0
Midfielders
7	MF	(France) FRA	Geoffrey Kondogbia	30	1	23+3	1	4	0
18	MF	(Chile) CHI	Gary Medel	33	1	28+1	1	4	0
27	MF	(Ivory Coast) CIV	Assane Gnoukouri	3	0	1+1	0	0+1	0
77	MF	(Croatia) CRO	Marcelo Brozović	35	7	25+7	4	2+1	3
83	MF	(Brazil) BRA	Felipe Melo	28	1	21+5	1	1+1	0
Forwards
8	FW	(Argentina) ARG	Rodrigo Palacio	30	3	15+12	2	1+2	1
9	FW	(Argentina) ARG	Mauro Icardi	34	16	32+1	16	0+1	0
10	FW	(Montenegro) MNE	Stevan Jovetić	28	7	18+8	6	2	1
11	FW	(France) FRA	Jonathan Biabiany	22	1	7+12	1	2+1	0
22	FW	(Serbia) SRB	Adem Ljajić	28	4	16+9	3	3	1
23	FW	(Italy) ITA	Éder	14	1	8+5	1	1	0
44	FW	(Croatia) CRO	Ivan Perišić	37	9	26+8	7	2+1	2
97	FW	(Albania) ALB	Rey Manaj	6	0	0+4	0	1+1	0
Players transferred out during the season
6	DF	(Brazil) BRA	Dodô	1	0	0	0	0+1	0
13	MF	(Colombia) COL	Fredy Guarín	16	1	11+5	1	0	0
14	DF	(Spain) ESP	Martín Montoya	4	0	3	0	1	0
15	DF	(Serbia) SRB	Nemanja Vidić	0	0	0	0	0	0
23	DF	(Italy) ITA	Andrea Ranocchia	10	0	1+9	0	0	0
88	MF	(Brazil) BRA	Hernanes	2	0	0+2	0	0	0
93	DF	(Italy) ITA	Federico Dimarco	0	0	0	0	0	0

Last updated: 14 May 2016
Source: Competitions

=== Goalscorers ===
Rank	No.	Pos	Nat	Name	Serie A	Coppa Italia	Total
1	9	FW	(Argentina)	Mauro Icardi	16	0	16
2	44	FW	(Croatia)	Ivan Perišić	7	2	9
3	10	FW	(Montenegro)	Stevan Jovetić	6	1	7
3	77	MF	(Croatia)	Marcelo Brozović	4	3	7
5	22	FW	(Serbia)	Adem Ljajić	3	1	4
6	8	FW	(Argentina)	Rodrigo Palacio	2	1	3
7	24	DF	(Colombia)	Jeison Murillo	2	0	2
7	33	DF	(Italy)	Danilo D'Ambrosio	2	0	2
9	7	MF	(France)	Geoffrey Kondogbia	1	0	1
9	11	FW	(France)	Jonathan Biabiany	1	0	1
9	13	MF	(Colombia)	Fredy Guarín	1	0	1
9	18	MF	(Chile)	Gary Medel	1	0	1
9	23	FW	(Italy)	Éder	1	0	1
9	25	DF	(Brazil)	Miranda	1	0	1
9	83	MF	(Brazil)	Felipe Melo	1	0	1
Own goal					1	0	1
Totals					50	8	58

Last updated: 14 May 2016

=== Clean sheets ===
Rank	No.	Pos	Nat	Name	Serie A	Coppa Italia	Total
1	1	GK	(Slovenia)	Samir Handanović	15	0	15
Totals					15	0	15

Last updated: 14 May 2016

=== Disciplinary record ===
N	P	Nat.	Name	Serie A			Coppa Italia			Total			Notes
N	P	Nat.	Name	Yellow card	Second yellow card	Red card	Yellow card	Second yellow card	Red card	Yellow card	Second yellow card	Red card	Notes
1	GK	(Slovenia)	Samir Handanović	5						5			
5	DF	(Brazil)	Juan Jesus	3			1			4			
7	MF	(France)	Geoffrey Kondogbia	6		1	1			7		1	
8	FW	(Argentina)	Rodrigo Palacio	5						5			
9	FW	(Argentina)	Mauro Icardi	1						1			
10	FW	(Montenegro)	Stevan Jovetić	4						4			
11	FW	(France)	Jonathan Biabiany	3						3			
12	DF	(Brazil)	Alex Telles	6	1					6	1		
13	MF	(Colombia)	Fredy Guarín	7						7			
18	MF	(Chile)	Gary Medel	10			1			11			
21	DF	(Italy)	Davide Santon	1			1			2			
22	FW	(Serbia)	Adem Ljajić	2						2			
23	FW	(Italy)	Éder	1			1			2			
24	DF	(Colombia)	Jeison Murillo	6	3		1	1		7	4		
25	DF	(Brazil)	Miranda	7	1	1	2			9	1	1	
33	DF	(Italy)	Danilo D'Ambrosio	4	1		1			5	1		
44	FW	(Croatia)	Ivan Perišić	5			1			6			
55	DF	(Japan)	Yuto Nagatomo	5	1	1				5	1	1	
77	MF	(Croatia)	Marcelo Brozović	7			1			8			
83	MF	(Brazil)	Felipe Melo	7	1	1				7	1	1	
97	FW	(Albania)	Rey Manaj	1						1			

Last updated: 14 May 2016
Source: inter.it, legaseriea.it
Only competitive matches
(yellow card) = Number of bookings; (second yellow card) = Number of sending offs after a second yellow card; (red card) = Number of sending offs by a direct red card.
