= 2015–16 AC Milan season =

Milan
2015–16 season
- Chairman Honorary Chairman: Vacant; Silvio Berlusconi
- Manager: Siniša Mihajlović (until 12 April 2016); Cristian Brocchi (from 12 April 2016)
- Stadium: San Siro
- Serie A: 7th
- Coppa Italia: Runners-up
- Top goalscorer: League: Carlos Bacca (18); All: Carlos Bacca (20)
Home colours	Away colours	Third colours

In the 2015–16 season, Associazione Calcio Milan competed in the Serie A for the 82nd time, as well as the Coppa Italia. It was their 33rd consecutive season in the top flight of Italian football.

Milan finished in seventh place in Serie A, failing to qualify for European competition for a third season in a row. Milan also reached the final of the Coppa Italia, losing to rivals Juventus after extra time.

== Squad information ==
No.	Player	Nat.	Position(s)	Date of birth (age)	Signed in	Contract until	Signed from	Transfer fee	Notes
Goalkeepers
1	Diego López	(Spain)	GK	3 November 1981 (aged 34)	2014	2018	(Spain) Real Madrid	Free	
32	Christian Abbiati	(Italy)	GK	8 July 1977 (aged 38)	1998	2016	(Italy) Monza	€0.75M	Vice-captain
99	Gianluigi Donnarumma	(Italy)	GK	25 February 1999 (aged 17)	2015	2018	(Italy) Milan Primavera	€250,000	From Youth system
Defenders
2	Mattia De Sciglio	(Italy)	RB / LB	20 October 1992 (aged 23)	2011	2018	(Italy) Milan Primavera	Free	From Youth system
5	Philippe Mexès	(France)	CB	30 May 1982 (aged 34)	2011	2016	(Italy) Roma	Free	
13	Alessio Romagnoli	(Italy)	CB	12 January 1995 (aged 21)	2015	2020	(Italy) Roma	€25M	
15	Rodrigo Ely	(Brazil) (Italy)	CB	3 November 1993 (aged 22)	2015	2019	(Italy) Avellino	Free	From Youth system
17	Cristián Zapata	(Colombia)	CB	30 September 1986 (aged 29)	2012	2016	(Spain) Villarreal	€6M	
20	Ignazio Abate	(Italy)	RB	12 November 1986 (aged 29)	2009	2019	(Italy) Torino	€2.8M	From Youth system
25	Stefan Simić	(Czech Republic) (Croatia)	CB	20 January 1995 (aged 21)	2015	2018	(Italy) Milan Primavera	Free	
31	Luca Antonelli	(Italy)	LB	11 February 1987 (aged 29)	2015	2018	(Italy) Genoa	€4.5M	From Youth system
33	Alex	(Brazil)	CB	17 June 1982 (aged 34)	2014	2016	(France) Paris Saint-Germain	Free	
96	Davide Calabria	(Italy)	RB / LB	6 December 1996 (aged 19)	2015	2018	(Italy) Milan Primavera	Free	From Youth System
Midfielders
4	José Mauri	(Italy) (Argentina)	CM	16 May 1996 (aged 20)	2015	2019	(Italy) Parma	Free	
10	Keisuke Honda	(Japan)	RW	13 June 1986 (aged 30)	2014	2017	(Russia) CSKA Moscow	Free	
16	Andrea Poli	(Italy)	CM	29 September 1989 (aged 26)	2013	2018	(Italy) Sampdoria	€9.7M	
18	Riccardo Montolivo	(Italy)	CM	18 January 1985 (aged 31)	2012	2016	(Italy) Fiorentina	Free	Captain
27	Juraj Kucka	(Slovakia)	CM	26 February 1987 (aged 29)	2015	2019	(Italy) Genoa	€3M	
28	Giacomo Bonaventura	(Italy)	LW	22 August 1989 (aged 26)	2014	2019	(Italy) Atalanta	€7M	
72	Kevin-Prince Boateng	(Ghana)	RW	6 March 1987 (aged 29)	2015	2016	(Germany) Schalke 04	Free	
73	Manuel Locatelli	(Italy)	CM	8 January 1998 (aged 18)	2010	2018	(Italy) Milan Primavera	Free	From Youth System
91	Andrea Bertolacci	(Italy)	CM	11 January 1991 (aged 25)	2015	2019	(Italy) Roma	€20M	
Forwards
7	Jérémy Ménez	(France)	SS / AM	7 May 1987 (aged 29)	2014	2017	(France) Paris Saint-Germain	Free	
9	Luiz Adriano	(Brazil)	ST	12 April 1987 (aged 29)	2015	2020	(Ukraine) Shakhtar Donetsk	€8M	
19	M'Baye Niang	(France)	ST / SS	19 December 1994 (aged 21)	2012	2019	(France) Caen	€3M	
45	Mario Balotelli	(Italy)	ST	12 August 1990 (aged 25)	2015	2016	(England) Liverpool	On loan	
70	Carlos Bacca	(Colombia)	ST	8 September 1986 (aged 29)	2015	2019	(Spain) Sevilla	€30M	

== Transfers ==
=== Summer 2015 ===
==== In ====
Date	Pos.	Player	Age	Moving from	Fee	Notes
9 June 2015	DF	(Italy) (Brazil) Rodrigo Ely	21	(Italy) Avellino	Free	
25 June 2015	MF	(Italy) Simone Verdi	22	(Italy) Torino	€450,000	Co-ownership solved
29 June 2015	MF	(Italy) Andrea Bertolacci	24	(Italy) Roma	€20,000,000	
29 June 2015	MF	(Italy) Matteo Pessina	18	(Italy) Monza	€20,000	
2 July 2015	FW	(Brazil) Luiz Adriano	28	(Ukraine) Shakhtar Donetsk	€8,000,000	
2 July 2015	FW	(Colombia) Carlos Bacca	28	(Spain) Sevilla	€30,000,000	
3 July 2015	GK	(Italy) Gianluigi Donnarumma	16	(Italy) Milan Youth System	Free	Promoted
6 July 2015	MF	(Italy) (Argentina) José Mauri	19	(Italy) Parma	Free	
8 July 2015	MF	(Argentina) Juan Mauri	26	(Argentina) Tiro Federal	Free	
15 July 2015	DF	(Italy) Davide Calabria	18	(Italy) Milan Youth System	Free	Promoted
10 August 2015	DF	(Italy) Alessio Romagnoli	20	(Italy) Roma	€25,000,000	
28 August 2015	MF	(Slovakia) Juraj Kucka	28	(Italy) Genoa	€3,000,000	

===== On loan =====
Date	Pos.	Player	Age	Moving from	Fee	Notes
27 August 2015	FW	(Italy) Mario Balotelli	25	(England) Liverpool	Free	

===== Loan returns =====
Date	Pos.	Player	Age	Moving from	Fee	Notes
1 July 2015	DF	(Czech Republic) Stefan Simić	20	(Italy) Varese	Free	
1 July 2015	MF	(Italy) Marco Bortoli	20	(Italy) Messina	Free	
1 July 2015	MF	(Ghana) Edmund Hottor	22	(Italy) Venezia	Free	
1 July 2015	MF	(Italy) Antonio Nocerino	30	(Italy) Parma	Free	
1 July 2015	FW	(France) M'Baye Niang	20	(Italy) Genoa	Free	
31 August 2015	FW	(Nigeria) Nnamdi Oduamadi	24	(Turkey) Şanlıurfaspor	Free	Unilaterally ended agreement

Total spending: ▼€86,470,000

==== Out ====
Date	Pos.	Player	Age	Moving to	Fee	Notes
13 May 2015	FW	(Brazil) Robinho	31	(China) Guangzhou Evergrande	Free	After return from loan
14 May 2015	MF	(Italy) Riccardo Saponara	23	(Italy) Empoli	€4M	Buy option exercised
2 June 2015	MF	(Ghana) Michael Essien	32	(Greece) Panathinaikos	Free	Expired contract
24 June 2015	MF	(Italy) Marco Fossati	22	(Italy) Cagliari	Free	After return from loan
26 June 2015	MF	(Italy) Mario Piccinocchi	20	(Italy) Vicenza	Free	
30 June 2015	MF	(Ghana) Sulley Muntari	30	(Saudi Arabia) Al-Ittihad	Free	
1 July 2015	GK	(Italy) Edoardo Pazzagli	26	Unattached	Free	Expired contract. After return from loan
1 July 2015	DF	(Italy) Daniele Bonera	34	(Spain) Villarreal	Free	Expired contract
1 July 2015	DF	(Romania) Cristian Daminuță	25	(Iraq) Zakho	Free	Expired contract. After return from loan
1 July 2015	DF	(France) Adil Rami	29	(Spain) Sevilla	€3.5M	
1 July 2015	DF	(Spain) Dídac Vilà	26	(Greece) AEK Athens	Free	After return from loan
1 July 2015	MF	(Hungary) Attila Filkor	26	(Hungary) Újpest	Free	Expired contract. After return from loan
1 July 2015	MF	(Portugal) Pelé	23	(Portugal) Benfica	Free	Expired contract. After return from loan
1 July 2015	FW	(Nigeria) Ezekiel Henty	22	(Slovenia) NK Olimpija	€150,000	Loan to full purchase
1 July 2015	FW	(Italy) Giampaolo Pazzini	30	(Italy) Hellas Verona	Free	Expired contract
2 July 2015	MF	(Slovenia) Valter Birsa	28	(Italy) Chievo	€1.5M	Buy option exercised
11 July 2015	MF	(Italy) Marco Pinato	20	(Italy) Vicenza	Undisclosed	After return from loan
16 July 2015	DF	(Brazil) Marcus Diniz	27	(Italy) Padova	Free	After return from loan
30 July 2015	DF	(Italy) Michelangelo Albertazzi	24	(Italy) Hellas Verona	Undisclosed	
6 August 2015	DF	(Hungary) Krisztián Tamás	20	(Italy) Spezia	Undisclosed	After return from loan
28 August 2015	GK	(Italy) Stefano Gori	20	(Italy) Bari	Undisclosed	
28 August 2015	FW	(Italy) Michael Fabbro	19	(Italy) Bassano	Undisclosed	
31 August 2015	DF	(Italy) Cristian Zaccardo	33	(Italy) Carpi	Free	
31 August 2015	MF	(Slovenia) Žan Benedičič	19	(Italy) Como	Undisclosed	After return from loan
1 September 2015	GK	(Italy) Davide Narduzzo	21	Unattached	Free	After return from loan
1 September 2015	FW	(Argentina) (Italy) Alessio Innocenti	22	(Italy) Melfi	Undisclosed	After return from loan
1 September 2015	DF	(Italy) Johad Ferretti	21	Unattached	Free	After return from loan

===== Loans ended =====
Date	Pos.	Player	Age	Moving to	Fee	Notes
1 July 2015	DF	(Italy) Salvatore Bocchetti	28	(Russia) Spartak Moscow	Free	
1 July 2015	MF	(Netherlands) Marco van Ginkel	22	(England) Chelsea	Free	
1 July 2015	FW	(Italy) Mattia Destro	24	(Italy) Roma	Free	

===== Loaned out =====
Date	Pos.	Player	Age	Moving to	Fee	Notes
23 June 2015	FW	(Italy) Gianmario Comi	23	(Italy) Livorno	Free	After return from loan, option to buy back
13 July 2015	FW	(Italy) Stephan El Shaarawy	22	(France) Monaco	€2M	Option to full purchase at €14M
13 July 2015	FW	(Italy) Gianmarco Zigoni	23	(Italy) SPAL	Free	Loan confirmed
14 July 2015	MF	(Italy) Alessandro Mastalli	19	(Switzerland) Lugano	Free	After promotion to first squad
15 July 2015	GK	(Brazil) Gabriel	22	(Italy) Napoli	Free	After return from loan
21 July 2015	FW	(Nigeria) Nnamdi Oduamadi	24	(Turkey) Şanlıurfaspor	Free	After return from loan
30 July 2015	FW	(Italy) Davide Di Molfetta	19	(Italy) Benevento	Free	
31 July 2015	FW	(Italy) Giacomo Beretta	23	(Italy) Pro Vercelli	Free	Loan confirmed
4 August 2015	MF	(Bosnia and Herzegovina) Andrej Modić	19	(Italy) Vicenza	Free	After promotion to first squad
10 August 2015	MF	(Italy) Matteo Pessina	18	(Italy) Lecce	Free	
16 August 2015	MF	(Italy) Simone Verdi	23	(Spain) Eibar	Free	Option to full purchase
17 August 2015	MF	(Argentina) Juan Mauri	26	(Italy) Akragas	Free	
25 August 2015	DF	(Colombia) Jherson Vergara	21	(Italy) Livorno	Free	After return from loan
26 August 2015	DF	(Italy) (Argentina) Gabriel Paletta	29	(Italy) Atalanta	Free	
30 August 2015	GK	(Italy) Michael Agazzi	31	(England) Middlesbrough	Free	Option to full purchase
30 August 2015	FW	(Italy) Andrea Petagna	20	(Italy) Ascoli	Free	After return from loan, option to buy back
31 August 2015	MF	(Morocco) Hachim Mastour	17	(Spain) Málaga	Free	Two-year loan. Option to full purchase and buy back
31 August 2015	FW	(Italy) Alessandro Matri	31	(Italy) Lazio	Free	After return from loan
31 August 2015	MF	(Nigeria) Favour Aniekan	21	(Slovenia) NK Krka	Free	Loan confirmed
31 August 2015	FW	(Italy) Matteo Chinellato	23	(Italy) Cuneo	Free	After anticipated return from loan

Total income: ▲€11,150,000
Net income: ▼€75,320,000

=== Winter 2015–16 ===
==== In ====
Date	Pos.	Player	Age	Moving from	Fee	Notes
9 December 2015	MF	(Ghana) Kevin-Prince Boateng	28	Unattached	Free	Effective from 4 January 2016
1 February 2016	MF	(Italy) Manuel Locatelli	18	Milan Youth System	Free	Promoted

===== Loan returns =====
Date	Pos.	Player	Age	Moving from	Fee	Notes
1 January 2016	MF	(Italy) Alessandro Mastalli	19	(Switzerland) Lugano	Free	Re-joined Primavera squad

Total spending: ▼€0

==== Out ====
Date	Pos.	Player	Age	Moving to	Fee	Notes
7 January 2016	DF	(Italy) Ivan Rondanini	20	(Italy) Savona	Free	Previously out of main roster
22 January 2016	FW	(Italy) Alessio Cerci	28	(Spain) Atlético Madrid	Free (end of loan)	Will play for Genoa
25 January 2016	FW	(Italy) Andrea Petagna	20	(Italy) Atalanta	€1M	After return from loan, will play for Ascoli
31 January 2016	MF	(Netherlands) Nigel de Jong	31	Unattached	Free	Will play for (United States) LA Galaxy
1 February 2016	DF	(Ghana) Edmund Hottor	22	Unattached	Free	Bought by Internazionale, will play for (Portugal) Atletico CP
16 February 2016	MF	(Italy) Antonio Nocerino	30	Unattached	Free	Will play for (United States) Orlando City

===== Loaned out =====
Date	Pos.	Player	Age	Moving to	Fee	Notes
27 December 2015	MF	(Spain) Suso	22	(Italy) Genoa	Free	Effective from 4 January 2016
19 January 2016	MF	(Italy) Matteo Pessina	18	(Italy) Catania	Free	After return from loan
26 January 2016	FW	(Italy) Stephan El Shaarawy	23	(Italy) Roma	€1.4M	After return from loan
29 January 2016	FW	(Italy) Davide Di Molfetta	19	(Italy) Rimini	Free	After return from loan
1 February 2016	MF	(Italy) Simone Verdi	23	(Italy) Carpi	Free	After return from loan
1 February 2016	DF	(Italy) Giorgio Altare	17	(Italy) Virtus Bergamo	Free	
22 March 2016	FW	(Nigeria) Nnamdi Oduamadi	25	(Finland) HJK	Free	Till 31 December 2016

Total income: ▲€2,400,000
Net income: ▲€2,400,000

== Pre-season and friendlies ==
Milan began their pre-season campaign taking on Italian lower division sides A.S.D. Alcione and A.S.D. Legnano in Solbiate Arno. Milan won both these first matches, with Nigel de Jong scoring the first goal of the season.

Milan was then involved in matches against several European top level cubs, including Lyon, Internazionale and Real Madrid in the International Champions Cup, and Bayern Munich and Tottenham Hotspur in the 2015 Audi Cup.

On 12 August, Milan won the 2015 TIM trophy after again defeating Inter and Sassuolo (the later after penalties) after two matches of 45 minutes each.

After the start of the season, Milan played other friendlies, mainly during October and November, including the Berlusconi Trophy and the Trofeo ‘San Nicola.

10 July 2015 Friendly	Milan	5–1	Alcione	Solbiate Arno, Italy
	De Jong 20' (pen.); Poli 30'; Cerci 45'; Niang 51', 61'		Gennarelli 5'	Stadium: Stadio Felice Chinetti

14 July 2015 Friendly	Milan	5–1	Legnano	Solbiate Arno, Italy
	Poli 39'; Alex 41'; Mastour 42'; Honda 64'; Verdi 73'	Report	Anelli 10'	Stadium: Stadio Felice Chinetti; Referee: Di Wang (China)

18 July 2015 Friendly	Lyon	2–1	Milan	Lyon, France
	Fekir 24'; Lacazette 78'		Poli 75'	Stadium: Stade de Gerland

25 July 2015 ICC	Milan	1–0	Internazionale	Shenzhen, China
19:00 CST	Mexès 62'			Stadium: Shenzhen Universiade Sports Centre

30 July 2015 ICC	Real Madrid	0–0 (10−9 p)	Milan	Shanghai, China
20:00 CST		Report		Stadium: Shanghai Stadium
	Penalties
	Rodríguez (penalty scored); Marcelo (penalty scored); Casemiro (penalty scored); Ramos (penalty scored); Kroos (penalty missed); Carvajal (penalty scored); Nacho (penalty scored); Cheryshev (penalty scored); Isco (penalty scored); Jesé (penalty scored); Casilla (penalty scored)		(penalty scored) De Jong; (penalty scored) Matri; (penalty missed) Bacca; (penalty scored) Honda; (penalty scored) Luiz Adriano; (penalty scored) Montolivo; (penalty scored) Zapata; (penalty scored) Mauri; (penalty scored) Calabria; (penalty scored) Paletta; (penalty missed) Donnarumma

4 August 2015 Audi Cup	Bayern Munich	3–0	Milan	Munich, Germany
20:45 CEST (UTC+02:00)	Bernat 24'; Götze 74'; Lewandowski 85'	Report		Stadium: Allianz Arena; Referee: Peter Sippel (Germany)

5 August 2015 Audi Cup	Tottenham Hotspur	2–0	Milan	Munich, Germany
18:15 CEST (UTC+02:00)	Chadli 8'; Carroll 71'	Report		Stadium: Allianz Arena; Attendance: 70,000; Referee: Robert Hartmann (Germany)

12 August 2015 TIM Trophy	Milan	2–1	Internazionale	Reggio Emilia, Italy
20:45 CEST (UTC+02:00)	Bertolacci 4'; Bacca 22'		Brozović 31'	Stadium: Mapei Stadium – Città del Tricolore
Note: 45-minute match

12 August 2015 TIM Trophy	Sassuolo	1–1 (3−4 p)	Milan	Reggio Emilia, Italy
22:45 CEST (UTC+02:00)	Duncan 7'		Nocerino 45+3'	Stadium: Mapei Stadium – Città del Tricolore
	Penalties
	Falcinelli (penalty scored); Floccari (penalty scored); Berardi (penalty missed); Duncan (penalty scored); Acerbi (penalty missed)		(penalty scored) Matri; (penalty scored) Cerci; (penalty scored) Suso; (penalty missed) Montolivo; (penalty scored) Nocerino
Note: 45-minute match

3 September 2015 Friendly	Mantova	2–3	Milan	Mantua, Italy
19:00 CEST (UTC+02:00)	Ungaro 17'; Trainotti 27'		Balotelli 3'; Poli 37'; Luiz Adriano 63' (pen.)	Stadium: Stadio Danilo Martelli; Attendance: 10,000

7 October 2015 Friendly	Monza	0–3	Milan	Monza, Italy
18:00 CEST (UTC+02:00)			Luiz Adriano 23'; Nocerino 28'; Cerci 41'	Stadium: Stadio Brianteo

21 October 2015 Berlusconi Trophy	Milan	0–1	Inter	Milan, Italy
18:00 CEST (UTC+02:00)		Report	Kondogbia 12'	Stadium: Stadio Giuseppe Meazza

24 November 2015 Friendly	Bari	0–1	Milan	Bari, Italy
18:00 CEST (UTC+02:00)		Report	Tonucci 12' (o.g.)	Stadium: Stadio San Nicola; Attendance: 15,000; Referee: Angelo Cervellera
Note: 45-minute match

24 November 2015 Friendly	Milan	1–0	Inter	Bari, Italy
20:00 CEST (UTC+02:00)	Poli 14'	Report		Stadium: Stadio San Nicola; Attendance: 15,000; Referee: Angelo Cervellera
Note: 45-minute match

24 March 2016 Friendly	Milan	4–0	Varese	Carnago, Italy
15:00 CEST (UTC+02:00)	Balotelli 17'; Luiz Adriano 27'; Balotelli 52'; Ménez 68'	Report		Stadium: Milanello

== Competitions ==

Mihajlovic's favourite starting line-up during most of his spell as AC Milan manager.

=== Serie A ===
The 2015–16 Serie A season began on 22 August 2015 and concluded on 15 May 2016.

==== League table ====
Pos	Team	Pld	W	D	L	GF	GA	GD	Pts	Qualification or relegation
5	Fiorentina	38	18	10	10	60	42	+18	64	Qualification to Europa League group stage (Note: Since the winners of the 2015–16 Coppa Italia, Juventus, qualified for European competition based on league position, the spot awarded to the cup winners (Europa League group stage) was passed to fifth-placed team and the spot awarded to the fifth-placed team (Europa League third qualifying round) was passed to the sixth-placed team.)
6	Sassuolo	38	16	13	9	49	40	+9	61	Qualification to Europa League third qualifying round
7	Milan	38	15	12	11	49	43	+6	57	
8	Lazio	38	15	9	14	52	52	0	54	
9	Chievo	38	13	11	14	43	45	−2	50	

Source: Serie A, Soccerway
Rules for classification: 1) Points; 2) Head-to-head points; 3) Head-to-head goal difference; 4) Goal difference; 5) Goals scored; 6) Draw.

==== Results summary ====
Overall								Home						Away					
Pld	W	D	L	GF	GA	GD	Pts	W	D	L	GF	GA	GD	W	D	L	GF	GA	GD
38	15	12	11	49	43	+6	57	9	6	4	28	22	+6	6	6	7	21	21	0

Last updated: 14 May 2015.
Source: Competitive matches

==== Results by round ====
Round	1	2	3	4	5	6	7	8	9	10	11	12	13	14	15	16	17	18	19	20	21	22	23	24	25	26	27	28	29	30	31	32	33	34	35	36	37	38
Ground	A	H	A	H	A	A	H	A	H	H	A	H	A	H	A	H	A	H	A	H	A	H	A	H	H	A	H	A	A	H	A	H	A	H	A	H	A	H
Result	L	W	L	W	W	L	L	D	W	W	W	D	L	W	D	D	W	L	D	W	D	W	W	D	W	D	W	L	D	D	L	L	W	D	L	D	W	L
Position	19	12	12	9	7	11	11	11	10	8	6	6	7	7	8	7	6	7	8	6	6	6	6	6	6	6	6	6	6	6	6	6	6	6	6	7	7	7

Updated to match(es) played on 14 May 2015. Source: Competitive matches
A = Away; H = Home; W = Win; D = Draw; L = Loss

==== Matches ====
23 August 2015 1	Fiorentina	2–0	Milan	Florence
20:45 CEST (UTC+02:00)	Roncaglia (yellow card) 31'; Alonso 38'; Iličić (yellow card) 45', (goal) 56' (pen.); Bernardeschi (yellow card) 59'	Report	Ely (yellow card) 9' (yellow-red card) 36'; Bonaventura (yellow card) 37'; Romagnoli (yellow card) 55'	Stadium: Stadio Artemio Franchi; Attendance: 33,904; Referee: Paolo Valeri

29 August 2015 2	Milan	2–1	Empoli	Milan
20:45 CEST (UTC+02:00)	Bacca 16'; Luiz Adriano 69'	Report	Saponara 20'; Tonelli (yellow card) 27'; Maccarone (yellow card) 42'	Stadium: San Siro; Attendance: 34,382; Referee: Piero Giacomelli

13 September 2015 3	Internazionale	1–0	Milan	Milan
20:45 CEST (UTC+02:00)	Juan (yellow card) 37'; Guarín 58'; Melo (yellow card) 63'	Report	Abate (yellow card) 22'; Honda (yellow card) 42'; Kucka (yellow card) 66'	Stadium: San Siro; Attendance: 79,154; Referee: Gianluca Rocchi

19 September 2015 4	Milan	3–2	Palermo	Milan
20:45 CEST (UTC+02:00)	Bacca 21', 75'; Bonaventura 40'; Montolivo (yellow card) 80'	Report	Hiljemark 32', 72'; Lazaar (yellow card) 45+3'; González (yellow card) 66'	Stadium: San Siro; Attendance: 33,689; Referee: Carmine Russo

22 September 2015 5	Udinese	2–3	Milan	Udine
20:45 CEST (UTC+02:00)	Piris (yellow card) 31'; Iturra (yellow card) 39'; Badu 51'; Wagué (yellow card) 53'; D. Zapata 58'; Fernandes (yellow card) 59' (yellow-red card) 90+3'; Marquinho (yellow card) 86'	Report	Balotelli 5', (yellow card) 15'; Bonaventura 11'; Calabria (yellow card) 18'; C. Zapata 45+1', (yellow card) 71'	Stadium: Stadio Friuli; Attendance: 16,500; Referee: Daniele Doveri

27 September 2015 6	Genoa	1–0	Milan	Genoa
12:30 CEST (UTC+02:00)	Džemaili 10', (yellow card) 67'; Pavoletti (yellow card) 58'; De Maio (yellow card) 61'; Burdisso (yellow card) 89'	Report	Bonaventura (yellow card) 11'; Romagnoli (yellow card) 18' (yellow-red card) 42'; Calabria (yellow card) 56'; Luiz Adriano (yellow card) 83'; Bertolacci (yellow card) 90+1'	Stadium: Stadio Luigi Ferraris; Attendance: 21,294; Referee: Paolo Tagliavento

4 October 2015 7	Milan	0–4	Napoli	Milan
20:45 CEST (UTC+02:00)	Bonaventura (yellow card) 32'; Antonelli (yellow card) 64'; Ely (yellow card) 66'	Report	Allan 13', (yellow card) 14'; Insigne 48', 68'; Callejón (yellow card) 61'; Ely 77' (o.g.)	Stadium: San Siro; Attendance: 50,488; Referee: Nicola Rizzoli

17 October 2015 8	Torino	1–1	Milan	Turin
20:45 CEST (UTC+02:00)	Baselli (yellow card) 20', (goal) 73'; Gazzi (yellow card) 41'; Bovo (yellow card) 75'	Report	Kucka (yellow card) 13'; Bonaventura (yellow card) 52'; Bacca 63'; Romagnoli (yellow card) 79'; López (yellow card) 88'	Stadium: Stadio Olimpico di Torino; Attendance: 25,477; Referee: Andrea Gervasoni

25 October 2015 9	Milan	2–1	Sassuolo	Milan
15:00 CET (UTC+01:00)	Bacca 31' (pen.); Abate (yellow card) 33'; Luiz Adriano 86'	Report	Consigli (red card) 30'; Berardi (yellow card) 31', (goal) 53'; Cannavaro (yellow card) 71'; Missiroli (yellow card) 87'	Stadium: San Siro; Attendance: 37,568; Referee: Gianluca Rocchi

28 October 2015 10	Milan	1–0	Chievo	Milan
20:45 CET (UTC+01:00)	Antonelli 53'	Report	Pinzi (yellow card) 50'; Cesar (yellow card) 58'	Stadium: San Siro; Attendance: 25,517; Referee: Gianpaolo Calvarese

1 November 2015 11	Lazio	1–3	Milan	Rome
20:45 CET (UTC+01:00)	Basta (yellow card) 59'; Kishna 85'; Gentiletti (yellow card) 90+2'	Report	Bertolacci 25'; Mexès 53'; Romagnoli (yellow card) 66'; Bacca 79'; Bonaventura (yellow card) 88'	Stadium: Stadio Olimpico; Attendance: 28,020; Referee: Antonio Damato

7 November 2015 12	Milan	0–0	Atalanta	Milan
20:45 CET (UTC+01:00)	De Sciglio (yellow card) 24'; Mexès (yellow card) 59'; Calabria (yellow card) 77'; Bacca (yellow card) 84'	Report	Cigarini (yellow card) 42'; Pinilla (yellow card) 48'; Gómez (yellow card) 56'; Carmona (yellow card) 89'	Stadium: San Siro; Attendance: 33,192; Referee: Piero Giacomelli

21 November 2015 13	Juventus	1–0	Milan	Turin
20:45 CET (UTC+01:00)	Sturaro (yellow card) 28'; Lichtsteiner (yellow card) 50'; Dybala 65'	Report	Kucka (yellow card) 31'; Alex (yellow card) 53'	Stadium: Juventus Stadium; Attendance: 40,841; Referee: Paolo Mazzoleni

28 November 2015 14	Milan	4–1	Sampdoria	Milan
20:45 CET (UTC+01:00)	Bonaventura 16'; Niang 38' (pen.), 49'; Kucka (yellow card) 39'; Luiz Adriano 79'	Report	De Silvestri (yellow card) 37'; Soriano (yellow card) 45+1'; Éder 87' (pen.)	Stadium: San Siro; Attendance: 32,368; Referee: Daniele Doveri

6 December 2015 15	Carpi	0–0	Milan	Modena
20:45 CET (UTC+01:00)		Report	Alex (yellow card) 14'; Romagnoli (yellow card) 57'	Stadium: Stadio Alberto Braglia; Attendance: 12,150; Referee: Massimiliano Irrati

13 December 2015 16	Milan	1–1	Hellas Verona	Milan
15:00 CET (UTC+01:00)	Bacca 52'; De Jong (red card) 56'; Bonaventura (yellow card) 72'; Abate (yellow card) 73'; Kucka (yellow card) 86'	Report	Toni 57' (pen.); Moras (yellow card) 60'; Pisano (yellow card) 68'; Wszołek (yellow card) 71'; Ioniță (yellow card) 72'; Márquez (yellow card) 82'; Gollini (yellow card) 84'	Stadium: San Siro; Attendance: 27,497; Referee: Paolo Valeri

20 December 2015 17	Frosinone	2–4	Milan	Frosinone
18:00 CET (UTC+01:00)	Ciofani 19', (yellow card) 90+1'; Tonev (yellow card) 45+1'; Soddimo (yellow card) 55'; Blanchard (yellow card) 62'; Pavlović (yellow card) 68'; Dionisi 84'	Report	Niang (yellow card) 49'; Abate 50'; Bacca 55'; Romagnoli (yellow card) 60'; Alex 77'; Donnarumma (yellow card) 83'; Bonaventura 90+3'	Stadium: Stadio Matusa; Attendance: 7,931; Referee: Luca Banti

6 January 2016 18	Milan	0–1	Bologna	Milan
15:00 CET (UTC+01:00)	Montolivo (yellow card) 31'; De Sciglio (yellow card) 58'; Abate (yellow card) 75'; Mexès (yellow card) 85'; Kucka (yellow card) 90'; Luiz Adriano (yellow card) 90+2'	Report	Mounier (yellow card) 12'; Diawara (yellow card) 21'; Masina (yellow card) 38'; Giaccherini 82'; Brighi (yellow card) 90+1'; Destro (yellow card) 90+3'	Stadium: San Siro; Attendance: 31,381; Referee: Davide Massa

9 January 2016 19	Roma	1–1	Milan	Rome
20:45 CET (UTC+01:00)	Rüdiger 4'; Manolas (yellow card) 29'; Pjanić (yellow card) 34'; Nainggolan (yellow card) 88'	Report	Kucka (yellow card) 28', (goal) 50'; Zapata (yellow card) 28'; Luiz Adriano (yellow card) 42'; Bertolacci (yellow card) 87'	Stadium: Stadio Olimpico; Attendance: 34,777; Referee: Daniele Orsato

17 January 2016 20	Milan	2–0	Fiorentina	Milan
20:45 CET (UTC+01:00)	Bacca 4', (yellow card) 68'; Bertolacci (yellow card) 73'; Boateng 88'	Report	Suárez (yellow card) 31'; Kalinić (yellow card) 45'; Vecino (yellow card) 59'; Tomović (yellow card) 67'	Stadium: San Siro; Attendance: 28,374; Referee: Daniele Doveri

23 January 2016 21	Empoli	2–2	Milan	Empoli
20:45 CET (UTC+01:00)	Zieliński 32'; Barba (yellow card) 36'; Saponara (yellow card) 60'; Maccarone 61'	Report	Bacca 8'; Bonaventura 48'; Honda (yellow card) 59'; Montolivo (yellow card) 60'; Balotelli (yellow card) 82'; Romagnoli (yellow card) 90+1'	Stadium: Stadio Carlo Castellani; Attendance: 11,499; Referee: Carmine Russo

31 January 2016 22	Milan	3–0	Internazionale	Milan
20:45 CET (UTC+01:00)	Alex 35', (yellow card) 58'; Kucka (yellow card) 65'; Bacca 73'; Niang 77'; Balotelli (yellow card) 80'	Report	Jovetić (yellow card) 45+1'	Stadium: San Siro; Attendance: 77,043; Referee: Antonio Damato

3 February 2016 23	Palermo	0–2	Milan	Palermo
20:45 CET (UTC+01:00)	Goldaniga (yellow card) 43'; Jajalo (yellow card) 50'; Vázquez (yellow card) 74'	Report	Bacca 19'; Niang 33' (pen.)	Stadium: Stadio Renzo Barbera; Attendance: 17,605; Referee: Paolo Mazzoleni

7 February 2016 24	Milan	1–1	Udinese	Milan
15:00 CET (UTC+01:00)	Montolivo (yellow card) 35'; Niang 48'	Report	Armero 17'; Badu (yellow card) 27'; Lodi (yellow card) 64'; Edenílson (yellow card) 76'	Stadium: San Siro; Attendance: 27,656; Referee: Massimiliano Irrati

14 February 2016 25	Milan	2–1	Genoa	Milan
12:30 CET (UTC+01:00)	Bacca 5'; Honda 64'; Romagnoli (yellow card) 90+2'	Report	Rigoni (yellow card) 67'; Cerci 90+3'	Stadium: San Siro; Attendance: 30,547; Referee: Gianpaolo Calvarese

22 February 2016 26	Napoli	1–1	Milan	Naples
21:00 CET (UTC+01:00)	Insigne 39'	Report	Bonaventura 44'; Donnarumma (yellow card) 53'; Montolivo (yellow card) 66'	Stadium: Stadio San Paolo; Attendance: 54,758; Referee: Luca Banti

27 February 2016 27	Milan	1–0	Torino	Milan
20:45 CET (UTC+01:00)	Antonelli 45'; Abate (yellow card) 69'; Boateng (yellow card) 80'	Report	Glik (yellow card) 43'	Stadium: San Siro; Attendance: 33,748; Referee: Domenico Celi

6 March 2016 28	Sassuolo	2–0	Milan	Reggio Emilia
15:00 CET (UTC+01:00)	Berardi (yellow card) 5'; Duncan 27'; Defrel (yellow card) 64' (yellow-red card) 77'; Sansone 72'	Report	Bonaventura (yellow card) 1'; Bertolacci (yellow card) 87'	Stadium: Mapei Stadium – Città del Tricolore; Attendance: 17,697; Referee: Piero Giacomelli

13 March 2016 29	Chievo	0–0	Milan	Verona
12:30 CET (UTC+01:00)	Dainelli (yellow card) 41'; Castro (yellow card) 60'; Cacciatore (yellow card) 84'; Gobbi (yellow card) 90+2'	Report	Ménez (yellow card) 44'; Bonaventura (yellow card) 85'; Abate (yellow card) 86'	Stadium: Stadio Marc'Antonio Bentegodi; Attendance: 15,000; Referee: Antonio Damato

20 March 2016 30	Milan	1–1	Lazio	Milan
20:45 CET (UTC+01:00)	Bacca 15'; Abate (yellow card) 76'	Report	Parolo 9'; Lulić (yellow card) 61' (yellow-red card) 84'; Biglia (yellow card) 72'	Stadium: San Siro; Attendance: 33,481; Referee: Paolo Tagliavento

3 April 2016 31	Atalanta	2–1	Milan	Bergamo
15:00 CEST (UTC+02:00)	Pinilla 44'; Cigarini (yellow card) 55'; Gómez 63'	Report	Luiz Adriano 5' (pen.); De Sciglio (yellow card) 31'; Bertolacci (yellow card) 45+2'; Zapata (yellow card) 49'	Stadium: Stadio Atleti Azzurri d'Italia; Attendance: 18,652; Referee: Gianluca Rocchi

9 April 2016 32	Milan	1–2	Juventus	Milan
20:45 CEST (UTC+02:00)	Alex 18', (yellow card) 59'; Balotelli (yellow card) 51'; Kucka (yellow card) 61'; Antonelli (yellow card) 89'	Report	Asamoah (yellow card) 20'; Mandžukić 27', (yellow card) 50'; Pogba 65'; Zaza (yellow card) 86'	Stadium: San Siro; Attendance: 75,393; Referee: Daniele Orsato

17 April 2016 33	Sampdoria	0–1	Milan	Genoa
20:45 CEST (UTC+02:00)	Krstičić (yellow card) 29'; Fernando (yellow card) 72'; De Silvestri (yellow card) 74'	Report	Bacca 71'; Poli (yellow card) 74'; Kucka (yellow card) 82'	Stadium: Stadio Luigi Ferraris; Attendance: 21,615; Referee: Paolo Valeri

21 April 2016 34	Milan	0–0	Carpi	Milan
21:00 CEST (UTC+02:00)	Balotelli (yellow card) 45+3'; Alex (yellow card) 67'	Report	Cofie (yellow card) 32'; Crimi (yellow card) 45+1'; Suagher (yellow card) 86'	Stadium: San Siro; Attendance: 28,801; Referee: Marco Guida

25 April 2016 35	Hellas Verona	2–1	Milan	Verona
17:00 CEST (UTC+02:00)	Albertazzi (yellow card) 48'; Pazzini 72' (pen.); Siligardi 90+5'	report	Ménez 21'; Zapata (yellow card) 67'; Mauri (yellow card) 73'	Stadium: Stadio Marc'Antonio Bentegodi; Attendance: 18,738; Referee: Marco Di Bello

1 May 2016 36	Milan	3–3	Frosinone	Milan
15:00 CEST (UTC+02:00)	Balotelli (yellow card) 26'; Kucka (yellow card) 45'; Bacca 50'; Antonelli 74'; Ménez 90+2' (pen.)	Report	Paganini 2'; Sammarco (yellow card) 10'; Gori (yellow card) 19'; Bardi (yellow card) 39'; Kragl 44', (yellow card) 45'; Russo (yellow card) 48'; Dionisi 54', (yellow card) 55'; Pryima (yellow card) 90+1'	Stadium: San Siro; Attendance: 35,936; Referee: Davide Massa

7 May 2016 37	Bologna	0–1	Milan	Bologna
20:45 CEST (UTC+02:00)	Diawara (yellow card) 6' (yellow-red card) 12'; Oikonomou (yellow card) 35'; Costa (yellow card) 39'; Giaccherini (yellow card) 89'	Report	Mauri (yellow card) 6'; Mexès (yellow card) 16'; Bacca 40' (pen.); Bertolacci (yellow card) 58'; Calabria (yellow card) 63'; Romagnoli (yellow card) 90+4'	Stadium: Stadio Renato Dall'Ara; Attendance: 22,544; Referee: Daniele Doveri

14 May 2016 38	Milan	1–3	Roma	Milan
20:45 CEST (UTC+02:00)	Locatelli (yellow card) 21'; Mexès (yellow card) 54'; Luiz Adriano (yellow card) 56'; Donnarumma (yellow card) 61'; Bacca 86'	Report	Salah 19'; El Shaarawy 59'; Emerson 82'	Stadium: San Siro; Attendance: 41,571; Referee: Nicola Rizzoli

=== Coppa Italia ===
The 2015–16 Coppa Italia began in August with Milan entering the competition in the third round. Their first match was against Serie B side Perugia and was played on 17 August 2015, following a request by Milan to delay the match by two days due to other pre-season obligations. Milan opened the score early through Keisuke Honda and then within 20 minutes, scored again through Luiz Adriano, who scored his first official goal for the club.

Milan then advanced into the fourth round where Crotone was defeated after extra time. Luiz Adriano during regular time, and Giacomo Bonaventura and M'Baye Niang during extra time were the scorers. Further in December, Milan also ruled out Sampdoria in an emotions limited match, thanks to Niang and Carlos Bacca goals, earning the right to face Carpi in the quarter-finals.

Milan played its first Coppa Italia match in 2016 against Carpi on 13 January. The Rossoneri progressed to the semi-finals by beating Reggio Emilia side with 2−1 at a moderately attended San Siro. Bacca gave Milan the lead after 14 minutes of play with a fine rabona, then Niang found himself on the scoresheet just before the half-hour mark. Milan will face Alessandria in a two-legged semi-final encounter.

In a rather tedious match, Milan came out victorious against Alessandria in the first leg of the Coppa's semi-finals. Mario Balotelli converted a penalty kick into a game-winning goal just before half-time. In the second leg, played at San Siro, Milan easily outplayed Alessandria and won the semi-finals 6–0 on aggregate. Jérémy Ménez scored a doppietta, while Alessio Romagnoli and Balotelli scored one goal each. Alessandria's Roberto Sabato also scored an own goal.

Milan then traveled to Rome to meet Juventus in the final on 21 May at Stadio Olimpico. The Rossoneri were defeated by Álvaro Morata's goal during the second period of extra time, despite being arguably the better opponent in the final, controlling the ball possession and the pace of the match and creating more scoring chances.

17 August 2015 Third round	Milan	2–0	Perugia	Milan
21:00 CEST (UTC+02:00)	Honda 10'; Luiz Adriano 28'; Antonelli (yellow card) 36'; Poli (yellow card) 77'	Report	Lanzafame (yellow card) 38' (yellow-red card) 64'	Stadium: San Siro; Attendance: 23,683; Referee: Massimiliano Irrati

1 December 2015 Fourth round	Milan	3–1 (a.e.t.)	Crotone	Milan
21:00 CET (UTC+01:00)	Luiz Adriano 47', (yellow card) 109'; Mauri (yellow card) 65'; Bonaventura 105+1'; Niang 115'	Report	Budimir 68'; Balasa (yellow card) 84'	Stadium: San Siro; Attendance: 10,229; Referee: Michael Fabbri

17 December 2015 Round of 16	Sampdoria	0–2	Milan	Genoa
21:00 CET (UTC+01:00)	Christodoulopoulos (yellow card) 61'; Zukanović (yellow card) 64', (red card) 64'	Report	Bertolacci (yellow card) 5'; Mexès (yellow card) 16'; Abate (yellow card) 34'; Niang 50'; De Sciglio (yellow card) 61'; Bacca 90+3'	Stadium: Stadio Luigi Ferraris; Attendance: 11,200; Referee: Domenico Celi

13 January 2016 Quarter-finals	Milan	2–1	Carpi	Milan
21:00 CET (UTC+01:00)	Bacca 14'; Niang (yellow card) 21', (goal) 29'; Boateng (yellow card) 66'; Montolivo (yellow card) 77'	Report	Lollo (yellow card) 22'; Silva (yellow card) 46'; Mancosu 50'	Stadium: San Siro; Attendance: 12,319; Referee: Gianpaolo Calvarese

26 January 2016 Semi-finals	Alessandria	0–1	Milan	Turin
21:00 CET (UTC+01:00)	Morero (yellow card) 43'; Sabato (yellow card) 50'; Sosa (yellow card) 86'	Report	Balotelli 43' (pen.)	Stadium: Stadio Olimpico di Torino; Attendance: 20,605; Referee: Massimiliano Irrati
Note: First Leg

1 March 2016 Semi-finals	Milan	5–0	Alessandria	Milan
21:00 CET (UTC+01:00)	Ménez 20', 39'; Romagnoli 24'; Sabato 80' (o.g.); Balotelli 89'	Report		Stadium: San Siro; Attendance: 28,202; Referee: Marco Guida
Note: Second leg Leg

21 May 2016 Final	Milan	0–1 (a.e.t.)	Juventus	Rome
20:45 CEST (UTC+02:00)	Zapata (yellow card) 50'; Honda (yellow card) 88'; Niang (yellow card) 101'; Mauri (yellow card) 119'	Report	Pogba (yellow card) 62'; Barzagli (yellow card) 105'; Morata 110', (yellow card) 119'; Chiellini (yellow card) 117'; Rugani (yellow card) 120+2'	Stadium: Stadio Olimpico; Referee: Gianluca Rocchi

== Statistics ==
=== Appearances and goals ===
No.	Pos	Nat	Player	Total		Serie A		Coppa Italia	
No.	Pos	Nat	Player	Apps	Goals	Apps	Goals	Apps	Goals
Goalkeepers
1	GK	(Spain) ESP	Diego López	9	0	8	0	1	0
32	GK	(Italy) ITA	Christian Abbiati	6	0	0+1	0	5	0
99	GK	(Italy) ITA	Gianluigi Donnarumma	31	0	30	0	1	0
Defenders
2	DF	(Italy) ITA	Mattia De Sciglio	29	0	21+1	0	7	0
5	DF	(France) FRA	Philippe Mexès	7	1	4+1	1	2	0
13	DF	(Italy) ITA	Alessio Romagnoli	40	1	33+1	0	6	1
15	DF	(Brazil) BRA	Rodrigo Ely	4	0	2+1	0	1	0
17	DF	(Colombia) COL	Cristián Zapata	21	1	14+2	1	5	0
20	DF	(Italy) ITA	Ignazio Abate	28	1	27	1	1	0
25	DF	(Czech Republic) CZE	Stefan Simić	0	0	0	0	0	0
31	DF	(Italy) ITA	Luca Antonelli	32	3	25+3	3	4	0
33	DF	(Brazil) BRA	Alex	25	3	24+1	3	0	0
96	DF	(Italy) ITA	Davide Calabria	8	0	3+3	0	2	0
Midfielders
4	MF	(Italy) ITA	José Mauri	10	0	3+2	0	2+3	0
10	MF	(Japan) JPN	Keisuke Honda	37	2	23+7	1	6+1	1
16	MF	(Italy) ITA	Andrea Poli	24	0	4+14	0	4+2	0
18	MF	(Italy) ITA	Riccardo Montolivo	35	0	31	0	2+2	0
27	MF	(Slovakia) SVK	Juraj Kucka	35	1	25+5	1	4+1	0
28	MF	(Italy) ITA	Giacomo Bonaventura	39	7	31+2	6	5+1	1
72	MF	(Ghana) GHA	Kevin-Prince Boateng	14	1	1+10	1	1+2	0
73	MF	(Italy) ITA	Manuel Locatelli	2	0	1+1	0	0+0	0
91	MF	(Italy) ITA	Andrea Bertolacci	30	1	21+6	1	2+1	0
Forwards
7	FW	(France) FRA	Jérémy Ménez	12	4	2+8	2	1+1	2
9	FW	(Brazil) BRA	Luiz Adriano	29	6	12+14	4	3	2
19	FW	(France) FRA	M'Baye Niang	21	8	15+1	5	2+3	3
45	FW	(Italy) ITA	Mario Balotelli	23	3	8+12	1	2+1	2
70	FW	(Colombia) COL	Carlos Bacca	43	20	36+2	18	4+1	2
Players transferred out during the season
8	MF	(Spain) ESP	Suso	2	0	1	0	1	0
11	FW	(Italy) ITA	Alessio Cerci	15	0	8+5	0	1+1	0
23	MF	(Italy) ITA	Antonio Nocerino	3	0	1+1	0	1	0
34	MF	(Netherlands) NED	Nigel de Jong	6	0	5	0	1	0

Last updated: 21 May 2016
Source: Competitions

=== Goalscorers ===
Rank	No.	Pos	Nat	Name	Serie A	Coppa Italia	Total
1	70	FW	(Colombia)	Carlos Bacca	18	2	20
2	19	FW	(France)	M'Baye Niang	5	3	8
3	28	MF	(Italy)	Giacomo Bonaventura	6	1	7
4	9	FW	(Brazil)	Luiz Adriano	4	2	6
5	7	FW	(France)	Jérémy Ménez	2	2	4
6	33	DF	(Brazil)	Alex	3	0	3
6	45	FW	(Italy)	Mario Balotelli	1	2	3
6	31	DF	(Italy)	Luca Antonelli	3	0	3
9	10	MF	(Japan)	Keisuke Honda	1	1	2
10	5	DF	(France)	Philippe Mexès	1	0	1
10	13	DF	(Italy)	Alessio Romagnoli	0	1	1
10	17	DF	(Colombia)	Cristián Zapata	1	0	1
10	20	DF	(Italy)	Ignazio Abate	1	0	1
10	27	MF	(Slovakia)	Juraj Kucka	1	0	1
10	72	FW	(Ghana)	Kevin-Prince Boateng	1	0	1
10	91	MF	(Italy)	Andrea Bertolacci	1	0	1
Own goal					0	1	1
Totals					49	15	64

Last updated: 21 May 2016

=== Disciplinary record ===
Includes all competitive matches. Players listed below made at least one appearance for A.C. Milan first squad during the season.

N	P	Nat.	Name	Serie A			Coppa Italia			Total			Notes
N	P	Nat.	Name	Yellow card	Second yellow card	Red card	Yellow card	Second yellow card	Red card	Yellow card	Second yellow card	Red card	Notes
1	GK	(Spain)	Diego López	1						1			
2	DF	(Italy)	Mattia De Sciglio	3			1			4			
4	MF	(Italy)	José Mauri	2			2			4			
5	DF	(France)	Phillipe Mexes	4			1			5			
7	FW	(France)	Jérémy Ménez	1						1			
9	FW	(Brazil)	Luiz Adriano	4			1			5			
10	MF	(Japan)	Keisuke Honda	2			1			3			
13	DF	(Italy)	Alessio Romagnoli	8	1					8	1		
15	DF	(Brazil)	Rodrigo Ely	1	1					1	1		
16	MF	(Italy)	Andrea Poli	1			1			2			
17	DF	(Colombia)	Cristián Zapata	4			1			5			
18	MF	(Italy)	Riccardo Montolivo	5			1			6			
19	FW	(France)	M'Baye Niang	1			2			3			
20	DF	(Italy)	Ignazio Abate	7			1			8			
27	MF	(Slovakia)	Juraj Kucka	11						11			
28	MF	(Italy)	Giacomo Bonaventura	8						8			
31	DF	(Italy)	Luca Antonelli	2			1			3			
33	DF	(Brazil)	Alex	5						5			
34	MF	(Netherlands)	Nigel de Jong			1						1	
45	FW	(Italy)	Mario Balotelli	6						6			
70	FW	(Colombia)	Carlos Bacca	2						2			
72	FW	(Ghana)	Kevin-Prince Boateng	1			1			2			
73	MF	(Italy)	Manuel Locatelli	1						1			
91	MF	(Italy)	Andrea Bertolacci	6			1			7			
96	DF	(Italy)	Davide Calabria	4						4			
99	GK	(Italy)	Gianluigi Donnarumma	3						3			

Last updated: 21 May 2015.
Source: ESPNFC.com
Only competitive matches
(yellow card) = Number of bookings; (second yellow card) = Number of sending offs after a second yellow card; (red card) = Number of sending offs by a direct red card.
