= Trofeo San Nicola =

- Founded: 2015
- Region: Italy
- Teams: 3
- Current champions: Milan (1st title)
- Most championships: Milan (1 title)

The Trofeo San Nicola is a yearly football friendly tournament played by three Italian football teams. The trophy is played in an unusual format where each team plays a traditional half of football against the other two teams, each half of which comprises a separate match.

== Winners ==
Team	Times played	Titles won	Years
Milan	1	1	2015
Bari	1		
Internazionale	1		

== Editions ==
=== 2015 Trofeo San Nicola ===
==== Standings ====
- Only one 45-minute half played.
- 3 points for win, 0 points for loss
- 2 points for penalty shoot-out win, 1 point for penalty shoot-out loss.
- Milan won the tournament.

Pos	Team	Pld	W	PKW	PKL	L	GF	GA	GD	Pts
1	Milan	2	2	0	0	0	2	0	+2	6
2	Internazionale	2	1	0	0	1	2	1	+1	3
3	Bari	2	0	0	0	2	0	3	−3	0

==== Scorers ====
Rank	Name	Team	Goals
1	(Colombia) Fredy Guarín	Internazionale	1
1	(Albania) Rey Manaj	Internazionale	1
1	(Italy) Andrea Poli	Milan	1

==== Matches ====
24 November 2015
19:00 CEST

Bari	0–1	Milan
		Tonucci 12' (o.g.)

Stadio San Nicola, Bari

24 November 2015
20:00 CEST

Bari	0–2	Internazionale
		Manaj 31'; Guarín 36'

Stadio San Nicola, Bari
Referee: Angelo Cervellera

24 November 2015
21:00 CEST

Milan	1–0	Internazionale
Poli 14'

Stadio San Nicola, Bari
