= 2015 International Champions Cup =

Tournament details
- Host countries: Australia; China; Canada; England; Italy; Mexico; United States
- Dates: July 11 – August 5
- Teams: 15 (from 2 confederations)
- Venues: 18 (in 18 host cities)

Final positions
- Champions: Australia: (Spain) Real Madrid (2nd title); China: (Spain) Real Madrid (3rd title); North America and Europe: (France) Paris Saint-Germain (1st title)

Tournament statistics
- Matches played: 23
- Goals scored: 63 (2.74 per match)
- Top scorer(s): (Sweden) Zlatan Ibrahimović (France) Jean-Kévin Augustin (Uruguay) Luis Suárez (3 goals each)

The 2015 International Champions Cup (or ICC) was a series of friendly association football tournaments. It was the first tournament played separately in Australia, China, North America and Europe.

The Australian edition of the tournament featured three teams played across three matches at the Melbourne Cricket Ground on July 18, 21 and 24. Real Madrid were the first club to announce their involvement. Manchester City and Roma were later confirmed to take part in the Australian tournament. The Chinese edition of the tournament featured Real Madrid, Milan and Internazionale playing a total of three matches in the cities of the Shenzhen, Guangzhou and Shanghai.

Real Madrid won both the Australian and the Chinese competitions.

The North American and European edition of the tournament featured 10 teams but some games were played in Mexico, Canada, Italy and England. Each team involved in the US edition played four games, except the three United States–based teams that only played two games. Select Major League Soccer (MLS) matches between the ICC competing teams counted towards the point total to allow MLS teams to have four games count on the table. 2014 International Champions Cup winners Manchester United were the first team to confirm their involvement in the US edition.

== Teams ==
Australia

Nation	Team	Location	Confederation	League
England	Manchester City	Manchester	UEFA	Premier League
Italy	Roma	Rome	UEFA	Serie A
Spain	Real Madrid	Madrid	UEFA	La Liga

China

Nation	Team	Location	Confederation	League
Italy	Internazionale	Milan	UEFA	Serie A
Italy	Milan	Milan	UEFA	Serie A
Spain	Real Madrid	Madrid	UEFA	La Liga

North America and Europe

Nation	Team	Location	Confederation	League
England	Chelsea	London	UEFA	Premier League
England	Manchester United	Manchester	UEFA	Premier League
France	Paris Saint-Germain	Paris	UEFA	Ligue 1
Italy	Fiorentina	Florence	UEFA	Serie A
Mexico	América	Mexico City	CONCACAF	Liga MX
Portugal	Benfica	Lisbon	UEFA	Primeira Liga
Spain	Barcelona	Barcelona	UEFA	La Liga
United States	LA Galaxy	Carson	CONCACAF	Major League Soccer
United States	New York Red Bulls	Harrison	CONCACAF	Major League Soccer
United States	San Jose Earthquakes	San Jose	CONCACAF	Major League Soccer

== Venues ==
Australia

Melbourne	Location of the host city of the 2015 International Champions Cup in Australia.
Melbourne Cricket Ground	Location of the host city of the 2015 International Champions Cup in Australia.
37°49′12″S 144°59′0″E	Location of the host city of the 2015 International Champions Cup in Australia.
Capacity: 100,024	Location of the host city of the 2015 International Champions Cup in Australia.

China

Guangzhou	Shenzhen	Shanghai	Location of the host cities of the 2015 International Champions Cup in China.
Tianhe Stadium	Shenzhen Universiade Sports Centre	Shanghai Stadium	Location of the host cities of the 2015 International Champions Cup in China.
23°8′26.33″N 113°19′9.58″E	22°41′49.70″N 114°12′43.90″E	31°11′0.61″N 121°26′14.28″E	Location of the host cities of the 2015 International Champions Cup in China.
Capacity: 58,500	Capacity: 60,334	Capacity: 56,842	Location of the host cities of the 2015 International Champions Cup in China.

North America

Seattle	Chicago	Toronto	East Hartford
CenturyLink Field	Soldier Field	BMO Field	Rentschler Field
47°35′42.72″N 122°19′53.76″W	41°51′45″N 87°37′0″W	43°37′58″N 79°25′7″W	41°45′35″N 72°37′8″W
Capacity: 67,000	Capacity: 61,500	Capacity: 30,000	Capacity: 40,642
Santa Clara	Location of the host cities of the 2015 International Champions Cup in North America.		Harrison
Levi's Stadium	Location of the host cities of the 2015 International Champions Cup in North America.		Red Bull Arena
37°24′10.8″N 121°58′12″W	Location of the host cities of the 2015 International Champions Cup in North America.		40°44′12″N 74°9′1″W
Capacity: 68,500	Location of the host cities of the 2015 International Champions Cup in North America.		Capacity: 25,000
San Jose	Location of the host cities of the 2015 International Champions Cup in North America.		Landover
Avaya Stadium	Location of the host cities of the 2015 International Champions Cup in North America.		FedExField
Capacity: 18,000	Location of the host cities of the 2015 International Champions Cup in North America.		Capacity: 79,000
37°21′5″N 121°55′30″W	Location of the host cities of the 2015 International Champions Cup in North America.		38°54′28″N 76°51′52″W
Pasadena	Carson	Mexico City	Charlotte
Rose Bowl	StubHub Center	Estadio Azteca	Bank of America Stadium
34°9′41″N 118°10′3″W	33°51′52″N 118°15′40″W	19°18′10.48″N 99°9′1.59″W	35°13′33″N 80°51′10″W
Capacity: 92,542	Capacity: 27,000	Capacity: 95,500	Capacity: 74,455

Europe

Location of the host cities of the 2015 International Champions Cup in Europe.	London	Florence
Location of the host cities of the 2015 International Champions Cup in Europe.	Stamford Bridge	Stadio Artemio Franchi
Location of the host cities of the 2015 International Champions Cup in Europe.	51°28′54″N 0°11′28″W	43°46′50.96″N 11°16′56.13″E
Location of the host cities of the 2015 International Champions Cup in Europe.	Capacity: 41,798	Capacity: 47,282

== Matches ==
Australia

July 18
19:00 AEDT (UTC+10)

Real Madrid (Spain)	0–0	(Italy) Roma
	Report
Penalties
Danilo (penalty scored); Kroos (penalty scored); Lucas Silva (penalty scored); Isco (penalty scored); Benzema (penalty scored); Nacho (penalty scored); Vázquez (penalty missed)	6–7	(penalty scored) Pjanić; (penalty scored) Ljajić; (penalty scored) Destro; (penalty scored) Florenzi; (penalty scored) Iturbe; (penalty scored) Paredes; (penalty scored) Keita

Melbourne Cricket Ground, Melbourne
Attendance: 80,746
Referee: Mark Clattenburg (England)

July 21
20:00 AEDT (UTC+10)

Roma (Italy)	2–2	(England) Manchester City
Pjanić 8'; Ljajić 86'	Report	Sterling 3'; Iheanacho 51'
Penalties
Nainggolan (penalty scored); Ljajić (penalty scored); Destro (penalty scored); Falque (penalty scored); Doumbia (penalty missed); Keita (penalty missed)	4–5	(penalty scored) Touré; (penalty missed) Kolarov; (penalty scored) Navas; (penalty scored) Lopes; (penalty scored) Hart; (penalty scored) Horsfield

Melbourne Cricket Ground, Melbourne
Attendance: 41,134
Referee: Jarred Gillett (Australia)

July 24
20:00 AEDT (UTC+10)

Manchester City (England)	1–4	(Spain) Real Madrid
Touré 45+4' (pen.)	Report	Benzema 21'; Ronaldo 25'; Pepe 44'; Cheryshev 73'

Melbourne Cricket Ground, Melbourne
Attendance: 99,382
Referee: Hiroyuki Kimura (Japan)

China

July 25
20:00 CST (UTC+8)

Milan (Italy)	1–0	(Italy) Internazionale
Mexès 62'	Report

Shenzhen Universiade Sports Centre, Shenzhen
Attendance: 38,497
Referee: Tan Hai (China)

July 27
20:00 CST (UTC+8)

Internazionale (Italy)	0–3	(Spain) Real Madrid
	Report	Jesé 29'; Varane 56'; Rodríguez 88'

Tianhe Stadium, Guangzhou
Attendance: 39,896
Referee: Fu Ming (China)

July 30
20:00 CST (UTC+8)

Real Madrid (Spain)	0–0	(Italy) Milan
	Report
Penalties
Rodríguez (penalty scored); Marcelo (penalty scored); Casemiro (penalty scored); Ramos (penalty scored); Kroos (penalty missed); Carvajal (penalty scored); Nacho (penalty scored); Cheryshev (penalty scored); Isco (penalty scored); Jesé (penalty scored); Casilla (penalty scored)	10–9	(penalty scored) De Jong; (penalty scored) Matri; (penalty missed) Bacca; (penalty scored) Honda; (penalty scored) Luiz Adriano; (penalty scored) Montolivo; (penalty scored) Zapata; (penalty scored) Mauri; (penalty scored) Calabria; (penalty scored) Paletta; (penalty missed) Donnarumma

Shanghai Stadium, Shanghai
Referee: Wang Di (China)

North America and Europe

April 17
19:00 EDT

New York Red Bulls (United States)	2–0	(United States) San Jose Earthquakes
Kljestan 29'; Grella 35'	Report

Red Bull Arena, Harrison
Attendance: 16,406
Referee: Jair Marrufo (United States)
- Note: Result taken from 2015 Major League Soccer season.
April 26
17:00 EDT

New York Red Bulls (United States)	1–1	(United States) LA Galaxy
Felipe 58'	Report	Jamieson 9'

Red Bull Arena, Harrison
Attendance: 20,062
Referee: Ted Unkel (United States)
- Note: Result taken from 2015 Major League Soccer season, counted as penalty loss for both teams.
July 17
20:00 PDT

LA Galaxy (United States)	5–2	(United States) San Jose Earthquakes
Keane 30' (pen.), 64', 80' (pen.); Gerrard 37'; Lletget 90+2'	Report	Amarikwa 22', 25'

StubHub Center, Carson
Attendance: 27,000
Referee: Alan Kelly (Republic of Ireland)
- Note: Result taken from 2015 Major League Soccer season.
July 11
20:30 PDT

LA Galaxy (United States)	2–1	(Mexico) América
Keane 45+1'; Gordon 79'	Report	Quintero 7'

StubHub Center, Carson
Attendance: 27,934
Referee: Armando Villarreal (United States)

July 14
19:30 PDT

San Jose Earthquakes (United States)	1–2	(Mexico) América
Goodson 23'	Report	Andrade 76'; Rivera 83'

Avaya Stadium, San Jose
Referee: Alejandro Mariscal (United States)

July 17
20:00 PDT

América (Mexico)	0–1	(England) Manchester United
	Report	Schneiderlin 5'

CenturyLink Field, Seattle
Attendance: 46,857
Referee: Edvin Jurisevic (United States)

July 18
20:30 EDT

Benfica (Portugal)	2–3	(France) Paris Saint-Germain
Talisca 34'; Jonas 42'	Report	Augustin 29'; Lucas 64' (pen.); Digne 79'

BMO Field, Toronto
Attendance: 17,853
Referee: Drew Fischer (Canada)

July 21
20:30 EDT

Paris Saint-Germain (France)	4–2	(Italy) Fiorentina
Matuidi 35'; Augustin 41', 75'; Ibrahimović 69'	Report	Joaquín 60'; Rossi 79' (pen.)

Red Bull Arena, Harrison
Attendance: 16,104
Referee: Jose Carlos Rivero (United States)

July 21
20:00 PDT

Barcelona (Spain)	2–1	(United States) LA Galaxy
Suárez 45'; Roberto 56'	Report	Meyer 90+1'

Rose Bowl, Pasadena
Attendance: 93,226
Referee: Ismail Elfath (United States)

July 21
20:00 PDT

Manchester United (England)	3–1	(United States) San Jose Earthquakes
Mata 32'; Depay 37'; Pereira 61'	Report	Alashe 42'

Avaya Stadium, San Jose
Attendance: 18,000
Referee: Juan Guzman (United States)

July 22
20:00 EDT

New York Red Bulls (United States)	4–2	(England) Chelsea
Castellanos 51'; Adams 70'; Davis 73', 77'	Report	Rémy 26'; Hazard 75'

Red Bull Arena, Harrison
Attendance: 24,076
Referee: Robert Sibiga (United States)

July 24
20:00 EDT

Benfica (Portugal)	0–0	(Italy) Fiorentina
	Report
Penalties
Almeida (penalty scored); Pizzi (penalty scored); Sílvio (penalty scored); Oliveira (penalty scored); Carcela (penalty missed)	4–5	(penalty scored) Pasqual; (penalty scored) Badelj; (penalty scored) Iličić; (penalty scored) Rebić; (penalty scored) Suárez

Rentschler Field, East Hartford
Attendance: 15,791
Referee: Sorin Stoica (United States)

July 25
13:00 PDT

Barcelona (Spain)	1–3	(England) Manchester United
Rafinha 90'	Report	Rooney 8'; Lingard 65'; Januzaj 90+1'

Levi's Stadium, Santa Clara
Attendance: 68,416
Referee: Baldomero Toledo (United States)

July 25
18:10 EDT

Paris Saint-Germain (France)	1–1	(England) Chelsea
Ibrahimović 25'	Report	Moses 64'
Penalties
Motta (penalty scored); Rabiot (penalty scored); Ongenda (penalty scored); Bahebeck (penalty missed); Cavani (penalty scored); Marquinhos (penalty scored); Thiago Silva (penalty missed)	5–6	(penalty scored) Falcao; (penalty scored) Azpilicueta; (penalty missed) Cuadrado; (penalty scored) Rémy; (penalty scored) Oscar; (penalty scored) Willian; (penalty scored) Courtois

Bank of America Stadium, Charlotte
Attendance: 61,224
Referee: Ted Unkel (United States)

July 26
19:30 EDT

New York Red Bulls (United States)	2–1	(Portugal) Benfica
Wright-Phillips 34'; Grella 56'	Report	Pizzi 7'

Red Bull Arena, Harrison
Attendance: 18,096
Referee: Alex Chilowicz (United States)

July 28
20:00 EDT

Chelsea (England)	2–2	(Spain) Barcelona
Hazard 10'; Cahill 86'	Report	Suárez 52'; Sandro 66'
Penalties
Falcao (penalty scored); Moses (penalty scored); Ramires (penalty scored); Rémy (penalty scored)	4–2	(penalty scored) Iniesta; (penalty missed) Halilović; (penalty missed) Piqué; (penalty scored) Sandro

FedExField, Landover
Attendance: 78,914
Referee: Allen Chapman (United States)

July 28
21:00 CDT

América (Mexico)	0–0	(Portugal) Benfica
	Report
Penalties
Martínez (penalty missed); Zúñiga (penalty scored); Marín (penalty scored); Colula (penalty scored); Rosel (penalty missed)	3–4	(penalty scored) Cristante; (penalty missed) Gaitán; (penalty scored) Samaris; (penalty scored) Santos; (penalty scored) Rodríguez

Estadio Azteca, Mexico City
Attendance: 10,373
Referee: Jorge Isaac Rojas Castillo (Mexico)

July 29
20:00 CDT

Manchester United (England)	0–2	(France) Paris Saint-Germain
	Report	Matuidi 25'; Ibrahimović 34'

Soldier Field, Chicago
Attendance: 61,351
Referee: Alan Kelly (Republic of Ireland)

August 2
21:00 CEST

Fiorentina (Italy)	2–1	(Spain) Barcelona
Bernardeschi 4', 12'	Report	Suárez 17'

Stadio Artemio Franchi, Florence
Referee: Massimiliano Irrati (Italy)

August 5
20:00 BST

Chelsea (England)	0–1	(Italy) Fiorentina
	Report	Rodríguez 57'

Stamford Bridge, London
Attendance: 41,435
Referee: David Coote (England)

== Tables ==
Australia

Pos	Team	Pld	W	WP	LP	L	GF	GA	GD	Pts	Final result
1	(Spain) Real Madrid	2	1	0	1	0	4	1	+3	4	2015 ICC Australia Champions
2	(Italy) Roma	2	0	1	1	0	2	2	0	3	
3	(England) Manchester City	2	0	1	0	1	3	6	−3	2	

Source: ICC

China

Pos	Team	Pld	W	WP	LP	L	GF	GA	GD	Pts	Final result
1	(Spain) Real Madrid	2	1	1	0	0	3	0	+3	5	2015 ICC China Champions
2	(Italy) Milan	2	1	0	1	0	1	0	+1	4	
3	(Italy) Internazionale	2	0	0	0	2	0	4	−4	0	

Source: ICC

North America and Europe

Pos	Team	Pld	W	WP	LP	L	GF	GA	GD	Pts	Final result
1	(France) Paris Saint-Germain	4	3	0	1	0	10	5	+5	10	2015 ICC North America Champions
2	(United States) New York Red Bulls	4	3	0	1	0	9	4	+5	10	
3	(England) Manchester United	4	3	0	0	1	7	4	+3	9	
4	(Italy) Fiorentina	4	2	1	0	1	5	5	0	8	
5	(United States) LA Galaxy	4	2	0	1	1	9	6	+3	7	
6	(Mexico) América	4	1	0	1	2	3	4	−1	4	
7	(Spain) Barcelona	4	1	0	1	2	6	8	−2	4	
8	(England) Chelsea	4	0	2	0	2	5	8	−3	4	
9	(Portugal) Benfica	4	0	1	1	2	3	5	−2	3	
10	(United States) San Jose Earthquakes	4	0	0	0	4	4	12	−8	0	

Source: ICC

== Top goalscorers ==
Rank	Name	Team	Goals
1	(Sweden) Zlatan Ibrahimović	(France) Paris Saint-Germain	3
1	(France) Jean-Kévin Augustin	(France) Paris Saint-Germain	3
1	(Uruguay) Luis Suárez	(Spain) Barcelona	3
4	(Belgium) Eden Hazard	(England) Chelsea	2
4	(France) Blaise Matuidi	(France) Paris Saint-Germain	2
4	(United States) Sean Davis	(United States) New York Red Bulls	2
4	(Italy) Federico Bernardeschi	(Italy) Fiorentina	2

Note: Goals from Major League Soccer games not included.

== Media coverage ==
Market	Countries	Broadcast partner	Ref
United States; Caribbean	24	Fox (English), ESPN Deportes (Spanish)	
Canada	1	TSN	
Mexico; Central America	8	Televisa, SKY México	
South America (excluding Brazil)	9	Direct TV	
Brazil	1	Esporte Interativo	
United Kingdom	1	Sky UK	
Spain	1	Canal+ Liga, TV3	
Italy	1	Mediaset Premium	
France	1	beIN	
Germany; Switzerland; Austria	3	Sport 1 (10 matches only)	
Netherlands	1	Eredivisie	
Iceland	1	365 Media	
Scandinavia; Finland	4	SBS Discovery	
Belgium	1	Belgacom	
Croatia	1	ArenaSport TV	
Portugal	1	Sport TV	
Balkans (excluding Bulgaria)	7	Arena	
Albania	1	Digitalb	
Romania	1	RDS	
Hungary	1	RDS	
Czech Republic; Slovakia	2	Digi TV	
Bulgaria	1	RING.BG	
Greece	1	Nova Sports	
Cyprus	1	Cyta	
Turkey	1	Dogan Group	
Malta	1	Go	
Israel	1	Charlton	
Russia	1	VGTRK	
Belarus	1	Belarus TV	
Baltics	3	Setanta	
Middle East; North Africa	22	beIN	
Sub-Saharan Africa	49	StarTimes	
Serbia; Bosnia; Macedonia; Montenegro	4	Arena sport	
Slovenia	1	Šport TV	
Eurasia	10	Setanta	
India	1	STAR India	
China	1	LeTV + regional channels	
Japan	1	J Sports	
Taiwan	1	Sportcast	
Hong Kong	1	i-Cable	
Macau	1	Macau Cable	
Vietnam	1	SCTV	
Singapore	1	StarHub	
Malaysia	1	Telekom Malaysia	
Indonesia	1	Indosiar	
Philippines	1	Perform	
Thailand	1	PPTV	
Myanmar	1	Sky Net	
New Zealand	1	VDR (3 Australian matches only)	
Australia	1	Nine Network	
Pakistan	1	Star Sports	
Total countries/territories	171		
