= Trofeo Luigi Berlusconi =

Annual association football exhibition match

- Founded: 1991; 35 years ago
- Abolished: 2021
- Teams: 2
- Last champions: Juventus (11 times)
- Most championships: AC Milan (13 times)
- Broadcaster: Mediaset

The Trofeo Luigi Berlusconi (Luigi Berlusconi Trophy) is an annual association football friendly match. It was first organized by Italian club AC Milan, and usually played in August at the San Siro, Milan's home stadium. After a five-year hiatus, the 2021 game was organized, for the first time, by Monza and played at the Stadio Brianteo, Monza's home stadium.

The competition was founded by Milan owner Silvio Berlusconi in memory of his father Luigi, and it was originally intended to be contested by Milan and former European Cup winners; in the first edition which took place on 23 August 1991; they faced Juventus. The match was won by Juventus 2–1.

Over the next three years, Milan played against Internazionale, Real Madrid and Bayern Munich respectively, winning all three times. Between 1995 and 2012, the tournament was contested exclusively between Milan and Juventus. In the 19 times Milan and Juventus have played each other, Juventus holds a 10–9 edge.

Due to scheduling conflicts no game was played in 2013. The game returned in 2014 with the 23rd edition; it was scheduled in November, but was not played against Juventus, but an Argentinian team, San Lorenzo: Milan won the game 2–0 to earn its 13th trophy. The 24th edition was played between Milan and Internazionale in 2015, won by Inter 1–0. In 2021, the tournament was restored and, for the first time in its history, did not involve Milan. The match was played between Monza and Juventus. This remains the last edition of the tournament dedicated to Luigi Berlusconi, which, starting in 2023, following the death of Silvio Berlusconi, has been effectively replaced by the Trofeo Silvio Berlusconi.

== List of results ==
No.	Date	Winner	Result	Loser
1	23 August 1991	(Italy) Juventus; 18’, 30’ Casiraghi	2–1	(Italy) AC Milan; 23’ Maldini
2	22 August 1992	(Italy) AC Milan; 4’ Papin	1–0	(Italy) Internazionale
3	17 August 1993	(Italy) AC Milan; 20’ Simone, 23’ Papin, 39’ Boban	3–2	(Spain) Real Madrid; 42’ Míchel, 55’ Zamorano (Penalty)
4	17 August 1994	(Italy) AC Milan; 67’ Gullit	1–0	(Germany) Bayern Munich
5	18 August 1995	(Italy) Juventus	0–0 (6–5) Penalties	(Italy) AC Milan
6	21 August 1996	(Italy) AC Milan; 83’ Eranio	1–0	(Italy) Juventus
7	19 August 1997	(Italy) AC Milan; 54’ Cruz, 60’ Kluivert, 62’ Weah	3–1	(Italy) Juventus; 31’ Conte
8	25 August 1998	(Italy) Juventus; 66’, 85’ Inzaghi	2–1	(Italy) AC Milan; 31’ Bierhoff
9	17 August 1999	(Italy) Juventus; 26’ Del Piero	1–0	(Italy) AC Milan
10	27 August 2000	(Italy) Juventus; 24’ Trezeguet, 65’ Inzaghi	2–2 (7–6) Penalties	(Italy) AC Milan; 2’ José Mari, 35’ Shevchenko (Penalty)
11	18 August 2001	(Italy) Juventus; 5’ Del Piero	1–1 (4–3) Penalties	(Italy) AC Milan; 85’ Serginho (Penalty)
12	18 August 2002	(Italy) AC Milan	0–0 (3–1) Penalties	(Italy) Juventus
13	17 August 2003	(Italy) Juventus; 40’ Del Piero, 45’ Camoranesi	2–0	(Italy) AC Milan
14	28 August 2004	(Italy) Juventus; 46’ Olivera	1–0	(Italy) AC Milan
15	14 August 2005	(Italy) AC Milan; 52’ Kaká, 76’ Serginho	2–1	(Italy) Juventus; 20’ Vieira
16	6 January 2007 (Note: The 2006 edition was postponed played in January 2007, because it was not possible to organize it in August due to fixtures in the UEFA Champions League for Milan and the Coppa Italia for Juventus.)	(Italy) AC Milan; 29’ Inzaghi, 68’ Seedorf, 86’ Aubameyang	3–2	(Italy) Juventus; 40’ Nedved, 67’ Del Piero
17	17 August 2007	(Italy) AC Milan; 43’ Inzaghi, 46’ Inzaghi	2–0	(Italy) Juventus
18	17 August 2008	(Italy) AC Milan; 21' Jankulovski, 25', 79 Ambrosini, 52' Inzaghi	4–1	(Italy) Juventus; 70' Pasquato
19	17 August 2009	(Italy) AC Milan; 69' Pato	1–1 (6–5) Penalties	(Italy) Juventus; 28' Diego
20	22 August 2010	(Italy) Juventus	0–0 (5–4) Penalties	(Italy) AC Milan
21	22 August 2011	(Italy) AC Milan; 9' Boateng 23' Seedorf	2–1	(Italy) Juventus; 57' Vučinić
22	19 August 2012	(Italy) Juventus; 13' Marchisio 42' Vidal 64' Matri	3–2	(Italy) AC Milan; 9', 77' Robinho (Penalty)
23	5 November 2014	(Italy) AC Milan; 30' Pazzini 84' Bonaventura	2–0	(Argentina) San Lorenzo
24	21 October 2015	(Italy) Inter; 12' Kondogbia	1–0	(Italy) AC Milan
25	31 July 2021	(Italy) Juventus; 13' Ranocchia 53' Kulusevski	2–1	(Italy) Monza; 87' D'Alessandro

Trofeo Silvio Berlusconi
- Founded: 2023; 3 years ago
- Teams: 2
- Current champions: AC Milan (15 times)
- Most championships: AC Milan (15 times)
- Broadcaster: Mediaset

No.	Date	Winner	Result	Loser
1	8 August 2023	(Italy) AC Milan	1–1 (7–6) Penalties	(Italy) Monza
2	13 August 2024	(Italy) AC Milan	3–1	(Italy) Monza
3	August 2026 - Pre-season 2026–27 Serie A - AC Milan - Inter - Juventus

== Total won ==
Club	Played	Winners	Winning years
(Italy) AC Milan	24	15	1992*, 1993*, 1994*, 1996, 1997, 2002, 2005, 2006, 2007, 2008, 2009, 2011, 2014, 2023 (Note: Trofeo Silvio Berlusconi), 2024 (Note: Trofeo Silvio Berlusconi)
(Italy) Juventus	20	11	1991, 1995, 1998, 1999, 2000, 2001, 2003, 2004, 2010, 2012, 2021
(Italy) Inter	2	1	2015
(Italy) Monza	3 (Note: 1 Trofeo Luigi Berlusconi and 2 Trofeo Silvio Berlusconi)	0	
(Spain) Real Madrid	1	0	
(Germany) Bayern Munich	1	0	
(Argentina) San Lorenzo	1	0	

'* defeated Internazionale, Real Madrid, Bayern Munich and San Lorenzo respectively

== Top goalscorers ==
Rank	Nat.	Player	Goals	Goal Years (Team)
1	(Italy)	Filippo Inzaghi	7	1998 (2), 2000 (Juventus), 2007 (3), 2008 (AC Milan)
2	(Italy)	Alessandro Del Piero	4	1999, 2001, 2003, 2007 (Juventus)
3	(Italy)	Massimo Ambrosini	2	2008 (2) (AC Milan)
	(Brazil)	Robinho	2	2012 (2) (AC Milan)
	(Netherlands)	Clarence Seedorf	2	2007, 2011 (AC Milan)
	(Brazil)	Serginho	2	2001, 2005 (AC Milan)
	(France)	Jean-Pierre Papin	2	1992, 1993 (AC Milan)
	(Italy)	Pierluigi Casiraghi	2	1991 (2) (Juventus)
7	(Italy)	Paolo Maldini	1	1991 (AC Milan)
	(Ghana)	Kevin-Prince Boateng	1	2011 (AC Milan)
	(Montenegro)	Mirko Vučinić	1	2011 (Juventus)
	(Brazil)	Alexandre Pato	1	2009 (AC Milan)
	(Brazil)	Diego	1	2009 (Juventus)
	(Italy)	Cristian Pasquato	1	2008 (Juventus)
	(Czech Republic)	Marek Jankulovski	1	2008 (AC Milan)
	(France)	Willy Aubameyang	1	2007 (AC Milan)
	(Czech Republic)	Pavel Nedvěd	1	2007 (Juventus)
	(Brazil)	Kaká	1	2005 (AC Milan)
	(Uruguay)	Rubén Olivera	1	2004 (Juventus)
	(Italy)	Mauro Camoranesi	1	2003 (Juventus)
	(Ukraine)	Andriy Shevchenko	1	2000 (AC Milan)
	(France)	David Trezeguet	1	2000 (Juventus)
	(Spain)	José Mari	1	2000 (AC Milan)
	(Germany)	Oliver Bierhoff	1	1998 (AC Milan)
	(Liberia)	George Weah	1	1997 (AC Milan)
	(Netherlands)	Patrick Kluivert	1	1997 (AC Milan)
	(Brazil)	André Cruz	1	1997 (AC Milan)
	(Italy)	Antonio Conte	1	1997 (Juventus)
	(Italy)	Stefano Eranio	1	1996 (AC Milan)
	(Netherlands)	Ruud Gullit	1	1994 (AC Milan)
	(Chile)	Iván Zamorano	1	1993 (Real Madrid)
	(Spain)	Míchel	1	1993 (Real Madrid)
	(Croatia)	Zvonimir Boban	1	1993 (AC Milan)
	(Italy)	Marco Simone	1	1993 (AC Milan)
	(Italy)	Claudio Marchisio	1	2012 (Juventus)
	(Chile)	Arturo Vidal	1	2012 (Juventus)
	(Italy)	Alessandro Matri	1	2012 (Juventus)
	(Italy)	Giampaolo Pazzini	1	2014 (AC Milan)
	(Italy)	Giacomo Bonaventura	1	2014 (AC Milan)
	(France)	Geoffrey Kondogbia	1	2015 (Internazionale)
	(Italy)	Filippo Ranocchia	1	2021 (Juventus)
	(Sweden)	Dejan Kulusevski	1	2021 (Juventus)
	(Italy)	Marco D'Alessandro	1	2021 (Monza)

== Statistics ==
- Coaches to have won the trophy multiple times include:
  - Carlo Ancelotti: (7 times with two teams) 1999 and 2000 with Juventus and in 2002, 2005, 2006, 2007 and 2008 with AC Milan
  - Fabio Capello: (5 times with two teams) 1992, 1993, 1994 and 1997 with AC Milan and 2004 with Juventus
  - Marcello Lippi: (4 times with one team) 1995, 1998, 2001 and 2003 with Juventus
- Filippo Inzaghi is the only player to have scored in and also have won the competition with two different teams: AC Milan and Juventus.
