= Andrea Poli =

Italian footballer (born 1989)

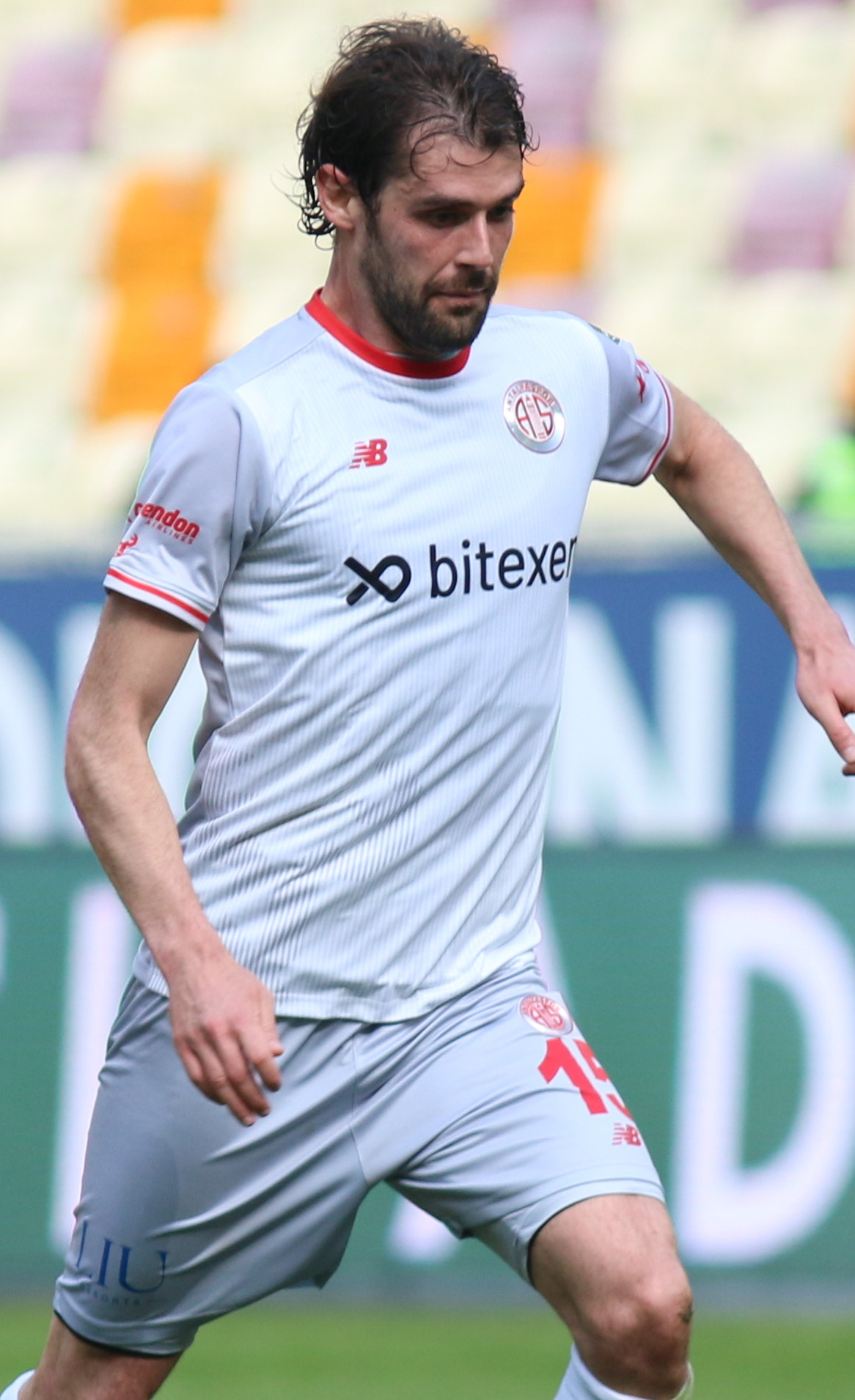
- Poli with Antalyaspor in 2022

Personal information
- Full name: Andrea Poli
- Date of birth: 29 September 1989 (age 37)
- Place of birth: Vittorio Veneto, Italy
- Height: 1.82 m (6 ft 0 in)
- Position: Midfielder

Team information
- Current team: Pro Sesto
- Number: 16

Youth career
- –2006: Treviso

Senior career*
Years	Team	Apps	(Gls)
2006–2007	Treviso	4	(0)
2007–2013	Sampdoria	84	(3)
2008–2009	→ Sassuolo (loan)	32	(5)
2011–2012	→ Internazionale (loan)	18	(0)
2013–2017	AC Milan	90	(3)
2017–2021	Bologna	108	(9)
2021–2022	Antalyaspor	28	(0)
2022–2023	Modena	11	(0)
2024–	Pro Sesto	10	(0)

International career^{‡}
2006	Italy U17	7	(0)
2006	Italy U18	4	(0)
2006–2008	Italy U19	11	(2)
2008	Italy U20	1	(0)
2009–2010	Italy U21	12	(1)
2012–2014	Italy	5	(1)
- * Club domestic league appearances and goals as of 3 May 2024 ‡ National team caps and goals as of 9 September 2014

Andrea Poli (Italian pronunciation: [anˈdrɛːa ˈpɔːli]; born 29 September 1989) is an Italian footballer who plays as a midfielder for Serie D club Pro Sesto.

== Club career ==
=== Treviso ===
He started his career in Serie B with his native club Treviso. He made his professional debut aged just 17 years, 2 months and 10 days under manager Ezio Rossi, in a 3–2 loss against Genoa C.F.C. on 9 December 2006. On 31 January 2007, he was signed by Serie A club Sampdoria in a joint ownership deal, but immediately loaned back to Treviso until officially becoming a member of Sampdoria at the end of the season. He made three further appearances for Treviso during the 2006–07 season.

=== Sampdoria ===
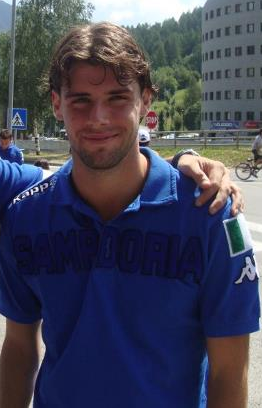
Poli with Sampdoria in 2012

On 4 November 2007, he made his Serie A debut for Sampdoria in a 0–3 away win against Cagliari, under manager Walter Mazzarri, aged 18 years, 1 month and 6 days. Andrea also made the bench on six other occasions in the 2007–08 season. He was also part of the Primaverasquad that won the Campionato Nazionale Primavera.

In the 2008–09 season he was loaned out to the Serie B club Sassuolo in order to gain experience. At Sassuolo he had a breakout season, making 33 appearances between the Coppa Italia and Serie B and managed five goals and three assists. A season highlight was scoring both of Sassuolo's goals against U.S. Grosseto F.C. in a 2–1 away win. During the season Andrea was also part of Italy's u19, u20 and u21 youth sides.

Upon his return to Sampdoria in the summer of 2009 he became a key player of the side that ended 4th in the league. He made 32 appearances playing as a central midfield playmaker and managed three assists. The next season Poli played less due to injuries and lack of form in Sampdoria side that endured a disastrous season. The side were knocked out of UEFA Champions League qualifying by SV Werder Bremen, were knocked out of the Europa League at the group stage and were eventually relegated from Serie A, finishing fourteen places lower than they did the last season.

=== Inter Milan ===
On 29 August 2011, Poli joined Internazionale on a season-long loan, with Inter having the option to buy him permanently in 2012. After missing most of the first half of the season through injury, Andrea had a very strong second half to the season and made 21 appearances for the Italian giants. Poli scored his first Inter goal in the Coppa Italia match against Genoa in a 2–1 win on 19 January 2012. He also made his UEFA Champions League proper debut against Olympique de Marseille. Despite his good performances for the Nerazzuri, Internazionale did not take up their buy option on the player and so he returned to Sampdoria.

Andrea returned to Sampdoria who were back in Serie A after just one season in Serie B. He made 32 appearances in the 2012–13 season scoring a career high three goals.

=== AC Milan ===
On 8 July 2013, Poli joined AC Milan becoming their third signing of summer 2013 for €3 million (€1.4 million plus 50% rights of Bartosz Salamon) in a co-ownership deal. Andrea made 37 appearances in all competitions in his first season with the Rossoneri. He managed two goals and four assists in what was a promising start to his Milan career. He was purchased outright by Milan on 9 June 2014.

=== Bologna ===
On 1 July 2017, he permanently joined Bologna by signing a four-year contract. The new four-year contract is worth €800,000 net per season.

On 15 October he signed his first goal for the rossoblu, in the 2–1 against SPAL.

=== Antalyaspor ===
On 23 July 2021, Poli signed a three-year deal with Turkish Süper Lig club Antalyaspor.

=== Modena ===
On 29 September 2022, Poli joined Modena in Serie B for the 2022–23 season.

=== Pro Sesto ===
On 7 February 2024, Poli signed with Serie C club Pro Sesto.

== International career ==
Poli was in the squad at the 2008 U-19 European Championships, where he scored two goals in the first round.

On 11 February 2009, he made his debut with the Italy U-21 squad in a 1–1 friendly draw against Sweden, played at the Stadio Nereo Rocco in Trieste. He was called up by manager Pierluigi Casiraghi for the 2009 European Championships in the summer, but did not make an appearance, as Italy reached the semi-finals, only to be eliminated 1–0 by eventual champions Germany. He scored his first goal for the under-21 side later that year, on 8 September, in a 2–0 home win over Luxembourg, in a Euro 2011 qualifier.

After being given his first senior international call-up by Cesare Prandelli on 10 August 2012, Poli made his debut with the Italian senior team on 15 August, coming on for Alberto Aquilani in the second half of a 2–1 friendly loss to England. On 31 May 2013, he scored his first goal with the national team, in a 4–0 friendly win against San Marino, in Bologna. Poli was initially included in Italy's 31-man preliminary squad for the 2013 FIFA Confederations Cup, but excluded from the final 23-man squad.

== Style of play ==
Poli mainly operates as an offensive-minded central midfielder, known as the "mezzala" role, in Italy, due to his ability to assist his team both offensively and defensively, although he can also be deployed as an attacking midfielder, or even as a defensive midfielder in front of the back-line; he has also been fielded as a full-back on occasion. He has been described as a versatile, energetic player, with good technical and creative qualities, which make him capable of starting attacking plays after winning back the ball. He also possesses an eye for goal due to his accurate striking ability from distance. He has been praised for his stamina, work-rate, and ability to read the game, as well as his tactical intelligence and discipline. Poli has been compared to Daniele De Rossi, and he has cited Andrea Pirlo, Frank Lampard, and Steven Gerrard as his role models, with the main focus on the latter.

== Career statistics ==
=== Club ===
As of match played 8 August 2024

Club	Season	League			Cup		Europe		Other		Total	
Club	Season	Division	Apps	Goals	Apps	Goals	Apps	Goals	Apps	Goals	Apps	Goals
Treviso	2006–07	Serie B	4	0	0	0	—		—		4	0
Treviso	Total		4	0	0	0	—		—		4	0
Sampdoria	2007–08	Serie A	1	0	0	0	—		—		1	0
Sampdoria	2009–10	Serie A	31	0	1	0	—		—		32	0
Sampdoria	2010–11	Serie A	21	0	2	0	5 (Note: One appearance in UEFA Champions League, Four appearances in Europa League)	0	—		28	0
Sampdoria	2012–13	Serie A	31	3	1	0	—		—		32	3
Sampdoria	Total		84	3	4	0	5	0	—		93	3
Sassuolo (loan)	2008–09	Serie B	32	5	1	0	—		—		33	5
Sassuolo (loan)	Total		32	5	1	0	—		—		33	5
Internazionale (loan)	2011–12	Serie A	18	0	1	1	1 (Note: All appearances in UEFA Champions League)	0	—		20	1
Internazionale (loan)	Total		18	0	1	1	1	0	—		20	1
AC Milan	2013–14	Serie A	26	2	1	0	10	0	—		37	2
AC Milan	2014–15	Serie A	33	1	2	0	—		—		35	1
AC Milan	2015–16	Serie A	18	0	6	0	—		—		24	0
AC Milan	2016–17	Serie A	13	0	0	0	—		0	0	13	0
AC Milan	Total		90	3	8	0	10	0	0	0	109	3
Bologna	2017–18	Serie A	32	2	1	0	—		—		33	2
Bologna	2018–19	Serie A	30	4	2	0	—		—		32	4
Bologna	2019–20	Serie A	28	2	2	1	—		—		30	3
Bologna	2020–21	Serie A	18	1	1	0	—		—		19	1
Bologna	Total		108	9	6	1	0	0	0	0	114	10
Antalyaspor	2021–22	Süper Lig	28	0	3	0	—		1 (Note: Appearance in Turkish Super Cup)	0	32	0
Modena	2022–23	Serie B	11	0	0	0	—		—		11	0
Pro Sesto	2023–24	Serie C	10	0	0	0	—		—		10	0
Career total			385	20	23	2	16	0	1	0	426	22

=== International ===
As of match played on 16 June 2015.

Italy national team
Year	Apps	Goals
2012	1	0
2013	3	1
2014	1	0
Total	5	1

== Honours ==
=== Club ===
AC Milan

- Supercoppa Italiana: 2016

Italy U21

- UEFA European Under-21 Championship bronze: 2009
