= Marco Piccioni =

Italian footballer (born 1976)

Personal information
- Date of birth: 25 January 1976 (age 50)
- Place of birth: Rome, Italy
- Height: 1.81 m (5 ft 11 in)
- Position: Centre back

Youth career
- Lazio

Senior career*
Years	Team	Apps	(Gls)
1996–1997	Ascoli	17	(0)
1997–1999	Prato	61	(1)
1999–2001	US Brescello	42	(0)
2001–2002	San Marino	31	(0)
2002–2004	Monza	39	(2)
2004–2012	Sassuolo	213	(12)
2012–2013	Padova	16	(0)
2013–2014	La Fiorita	0	(0)
2014	Juve Stabia	5	(1)
Total		424	(16)

Managerial career
- 2022: AC Colorno Calcio
- * Club domestic league appearances and goals

Marco Piccioni (born 25 January 1976) is an Italian manager and former footballer.

== Career ==
=== Early spells in Lega Pro ===
Born in Rome, Lazio, Piccioni started his career at hometown club S.S. Lazio. After graduating from the Primavera under-20 team, he left for Serie C1 and Serie C2 teams such as Ascoli, Prato, Brescello, San Marino Calcio and Monza.

=== Sassuolo ===
In mid-2004 Piccioni was signed by Serie C2 club Sassuolo along with Manuel Benetti and Filippo Pensalfini. The club also signed defender Fabrizio Anselmi, Nicolò Consolini, Sebastiano Girelli, Edevaldo Grimaldi, forward Gaetano Masucci and keeper Alberto Pomini, who all became a key player for the club promoted from Serie C2 to Serie B in 2008. In 2011–12 season, Piccioni, along with Consolini, Masucci and Pomini, were the only four players from the original 2004–05 squad plus Francesco Magnanelli who already played for Sassuolo since 2005. At first a midfielder, Piccioni later became a centre-back. Piccioni was the captain of the team in 2011–12 Serie B, while Magnanelli was the vice-captain. Piccioni wore no.6 shirt since the team promoted to the second division. In Italian Serie C, the team did not have a fixed number.

Piccioni played an average of 26 games per season (as of 2010–11 season). He had been suspended 11 times: (2004–05 once), (2005–06 twice), (2006–07 twice), (2007–08 three), (2008–09, once), (2009–10, once) and (2010–11, once)

2004–08

Piccioni played 26 games (25 starts) in 2004–05 Serie C1. However, he only played once in the first leg of the promotion playoffs. Piccioni made 5 more appearances than last season in 2005–06 Serie C2 (31 games and starts). He also played all 4 games in promotion playoffs. (but as emergency left-back) Piccioni remained as the midfielder in 2006–07 Serie C1 and played both leg of the first round (semi-finals) of promotion playoffs, losing to former club Monza. The playoffs used Piccioni as centre-back in the starting 4–3–3 formation.

He scored a career high of 6 goals in 2007–08 Serie C1. The club promoted directly as one of the two group stage champion. In 2008 Supercoppa di Lega di Prima Divisione, winning Salernitana to become the grand champion of the third division. Piccioni himself was one of the midfielder in the super cup.

2008–09

Piccioni made his Serie B debut at age 32. He played half of the matches of 2008–09 Serie B (23 of 42). New coach Andrea Mandorlini remained to use 4–3–3 formation, and used Piccioni as midfielder.

2009–10

In 2009–10 Serie B, Piccioni played 17 starts in 23 appearances. That season he also transformed into a centre-back by Stefano Pioli. However the usual centre-back were Mauro Minelli and Tiziano Polenghi. He also faced competition from Consolini. Piccioni did not play any games in the playoffs.

2010–11

Sassuolo performed poorly in 2010–11 Serie B. Under three coaches Daniele Arrigoni, Angelo Gregucci and Paolo Mandelli (caretaker), the team almost relegated. Piccioni made 18 appearances (14 starts) as a centre-back. As the team lack of signing (just Paolo Bianco and the renewal of Gianluigi Bianco's loan), the coach rely on the original members Consolini, Angelo Rea, Nicola Donazzan and Polenghi as defenders. In January 2011 the club re-signed Jonathan Rossini and swapped Minelli with Antonio Bocchetti. No players were able to play more than 30 games among the defenders.

2011–12

At the start of 2011–12 Serie B, Sassuolo re-launched the signing scheme. Piccioni also signed a new 1-year deal on 22 June 2011, which followed by Consolini and Donazzan. Under Fulvio Pea, the team used a 3–5–2 formation. Before the winter break the starting defenders were Bianco, Piccioni and Emanuele Terranova, with Alessandro Longhi and Lino Marzorati as wingback. Piccioni also named as the captain. However, after the January transfer window the coach used Consolini, Bianco and Marzorati as centre-back, Marcello Gazzola as right-back and Magnanelli as captain when Piccioni did not play.

On 25 February Piccioni returned to starting XI (round 28 to 30). However Piccioni missed the round 31 again despite received the call-up from Pea. Instead, Bianco returned to starting XI after suspended in round 30. Piccioni once again returned to starting-XI in round 35 and played until the last round. Piccioni left the club at the end of season.

=== Padova ===
On 4 July 2012 Piccioni was signed by fellow Serie B team Calcio Padova on free transfer.

=== Juve Stabia ===
In January 2014, Piccioni joined Serie B side Juve Stabia after a short spell with La Fiorita in San Marino.

== Honours ==
- Supercoppa di Lega di Prima Divisione: 2008 (Sassuolo)
  - Lega Pro Prima Divisione: 2008 (Sassuolo)
