= Nicolò Consolini =

Italian footballer (born 1984)

Personal information
- Date of birth: 22 December 1984 (age 41)
- Place of birth: Bologna, Italy
- Height: 1.79 m (5 ft 10 1/2 in)
- Position: Centre back

Youth career
- –2004: Bologna

Senior career*
Years	Team	Apps	(Gls)
2003–2004	Bologna	0	(0)
2004–2012	Sassuolo	179	(2)
2012–2014	Cesena	51	(0)
2015	Real Vicenza	0	(0)
Total		230	(2)
- * Club domestic league appearances and goals

Nicolò Consolini (born 22 December 1984) is a Italian former footballer who plays as a centre back.

== Career ==
=== Bologna ===
Born in Bologna, capital of Emilia–Romagna region, Consolini started his career with hometown club Bologna F.C. 1909. However Consolini never became a true member of the team. Consolini played his only game for the first team in 2003–04 Coppa Italia, against Brindisi on 2 October 2003. He wore no.29 shirt that season.

=== Sassuolo ===
In mid-2004 Consolini was transferred to Emilia minor club Sassuolo. That season the club also signed defenders Fabrizio Anselmi, Sebastiano Girelli, Edevaldo Grimaldi, midfielder Marco Piccioni and keeper Alberto Pomini whom became the key players for the team promoted from Serie C2 to Serie B in 2008. However, only Piccioni, Pomini and Consolini remained in 2011–12 Serie B squad, plus Francesco Magnanelli who played for Sassuolo since 2005. Consolini also transformed to an importance backup player of the team, instead of a regular starter with ability to reach the playoffs with team.

Consolini wore no.27 shirt for Sassuolo since 2008. Prior 2008 the team was in Serie C, did not have a fixed number.

2004–05

Consolini played 25 games (19 starts) in 2004–05 Serie C2. In the promotion playoffs Consolini substituted Manuel Benetti in the return leg against Pizzighettone. He also started the first leg. The team lost in the first round (semi-finals).

2005–06

Consolini made an improvement in 2005–06 Serie C2, with 30 games (28 starts). He played all 4 promotion playoffs as centre-back and Sassuolo won.

2006–07

In Consolini's maiden Serie C1 season, he made 33 appearances (29 starts). However Consolini did not play in the promotion playoffs (instead Gian Marco Remondina used Grimaldi, Anselmi, Benetti & Piccioni in the defensive line).

2007–08

Consolini made 25 starts in 2007–08 Serie C1. Sassuolo won direct promotion as one of the two group winner. Massimiliano Allegri also used Consolini in Supercoppa di Lega di Prima Divisione, winning Salernitana to become the grand champion of the third division.

2008–09

Consolini faced his first challenge in 2008–09 Serie B. Under Andrea Mandorlini, Consolini only made 18 appearances (14 starts). The club signed Marco Andreolli as new centre-back, and experienced Anselmi was also transformed to centre-back. The team finished as the 7th, 4 points behind the playoffs participant Grosseto.

2009–10

In 2009–10 Serie B saw the departure of Andreolli and Anselmi. However, Consolini was limited to 19 games (12 starts). He also played as an emergency left-back during the season. Piccioni also transformed to a centre-back. Stefano Pioli used new signing Mauro Minelli and Tiziano Polenghi as centre-backs in the playoffs. (They were the usual centre-back during the season) Consolini only able to play in the return leg as Polenghi rested. Sassuolo finished as the fourth that season.

2010–11

Sassuolo performed poorly in 2010–11 Serie B. The club had appointed three coaches: Daniele Arrigoni, Angelo Gregucci and Paolo Mandelli (care-taker). Sassuolo also did not find any replacement to every position in the defensive line, with Paolo Bianco and the renewal of Gianluigi Bianco's loan were the only signings. The club did not purchase fullback Jonathan Rossini from Sampdoria. Thus the club had to rely on old member of the squad, such as Piccioni, Angelo Rea, Nicola Donazzan and Tiziano Polenghi. Consolini also returned to starting XI with 20 starts in 28 games. He only missed the whole December as well as on the bench all the time in February. The team re-acquired Rossini on 3 January 2011 to fix the defensive line. The club also swapped Minelli with Antonio Bocchetti, despite the latter was an unsuccessful signing. That season Consolini also played as a left-back.

2011–12

Sassuolo restarted its signing scheme in 2011–12 Serie B. On 28 June 2011 Consolini signed a new 1-year contract. That season Masucci, Donazzan, Rea and Piccioni also offered a new deals varies from 1 to 2 years, which Magnanelli and Falcinelli signed a new 3-year deal on 8 July. Under Fulvio Pea, the team used 3–5–2 formation with the centre-backs were Paolo Bianco, Emanuele Terranova and Piccioni. Moreover, Lino Marzorati capable to play as a centre-back or right-wingback. As of March 2012, Consolini made 11 starts, almost all after January 2012. He also played as a midfielder.

=== Cesena ===
In December 2012 Consolini was signed by Serie B club Cesena as free agent. He signed a new 1-year contract in May 2013.

== Honours ==
- Supercoppa di Lega di Prima Divisione: 2008 (Sassuolo)
  - Lega Pro Prima Divisione: 2008 (Sassuolo)
