= Sebastiano Girelli =

Italian footballer (born 1984)

Personal information
- Date of birth: 3 February 1984 (age 42)
- Place of birth: Mantua, Italy
- Height: 1.80 m (5 ft 11 in)
- Position: Right back

Youth career
- Parma

Senior career*
Years	Team	Apps	(Gls)
2004–2011	Sassuolo	90	(2)
2009–2010	→ Reggiana (loan)	30	(0)
2011–2013	Mantova	41	(0)
2013–2018	Virtus Castelfranco	102	(6)
2018–2022	SS Serenissima 1918		
Total		263	(8)

International career
2005	Italy U20 Serie C		
- * Club domestic league appearances and goals

Sebastiano Girelli (born 3 February 1984) is an Italian former footballer who plays as a right back.

== Career ==
=== Parma ===
Born in Mantua (Italian: Mantova), Lombardy, Girelli started his professional career at nearby Emilia team Parma (about 55 km away). Girelli was the member of Parma's Primavera under-20 team. In 2003–04 Serie A, Girelli took no.2 shirt of the first team which vacated by Aimo Diana. Girelli was named in the B squad for 2003–04 UEFA Cup and received a call-up against Venezia in 2003–04 Coppa Italia.

=== Sassuolo ===
In mid-2004 Girelli graduated from the youth system and transferred to Sassuolo in co-ownership deal, a minor team of Emilia region. In June 2005 the team acquired Girelli outright. From 2004 to 2011 (except 2009–10 season) Girelli made 90 league appearances in total (15 games in average) for Sassuolo and suspended 6 times (in average once per season). He was one of the protagonist in Sassuolo's promotion from Serie C2 to Serie B, but did not make a major impact in Serie B from 2008 to 2011.

Girelli played 20 games in 2004–05 Serie C2. Girelli also played in the first round (semi-finals) of the promotion playoffs as a defender, losing to Pizzighettone. (right-back was Edevaldo Grimaldi and Anselmi rested, the other defenders were Consolini/Benetti) Girelli also suspended twice due to 4th and 8th yellow card. In June 2005, Sassuolo bought Girelli outright. He won promotion to Serie C1 in 2006, as the playoffs winner. In the playoffs Fabrizio Anselmi was the starting defender in the 4–3–3 formation, which Girelli only played once to replace rested Anselmi, with Piccioni as emergency left-back. Grimaldi remained as the right-back. Despite only played 18 times in 2005–06 Serie C2, in July 2006 Serie B club Modena signed Girelli outright. In June 2006 Modena also bought back Cris Gilioli from Sassuolo.

However, Girelli did not stay in Modena (which is the capital of the province of the same name which Sassuolo is located), but returned to Sassuolo in temporary deal along with William Jidayi. Girelli only able to play 15 times in 2006–07 Serie C1. He only played once in promotion playoffs, substituted right-back Grimaldi in the first game.

In July 2007, Sassuolo re-acquired half of the registration rights from Modena, as well as signing half of the card of Jidayi. Girelli made an improvement in 2007–08 Serie C1, with 27 appearances and 2 goals. However Girelli also suspended twice, one due to send off, one due to 4th yellow card. The Group A champion also won Supercoppa di Lega di Prima Divisione. Girelli was the starting defender of the team in the super cup return leg, which Grimaldi was the right back in both leg. In June 2008, Sassuolo bought back the remain 50% rights, but Girelli also returned to Modena as the club had to borrow Stadio Alberto Braglia.

However Girelli failed to play regularly in his maiden Serie B season. In 2008–09 Serie B season he only played 5 times, with one sent off (in round 39). Girelli made his Serie B debut on 21 March 2009 as starting defender. The coach rested the usual defender Angelo Rea in those 5 matches. That season Anselmi the usual to centre-back with Nicola Donazzan as left-back, while the departure of Grimaldi was replaced by Rea.

In August 2009, he left for another Emilia team Reggiana. In 2009–10 Lega Pro Prima Divisione, Girelli played 28 times in the third division as right-back. That season Massimiliano Mei was the left-back of the team.

Girelli returned to Sassuolo again in 2010–11 Serie B. He only made one more league appearance for the team, replacing Rea few minutes before the half time and was sent off in the second half. Before leaving Sassuolo, he was one of the longest serving players in the 2010–11 squad. (Nicolò Consolini, Marco Piccioni, keeper Alberto Pomini continuously serving Sassuolo since 2004 without any loan; Gaetano Masucci since 2004 with half season on loan; Francesco Magnanelli since 2005) Girelli wore no.15 shirt, no.5 (took from Bastrini) and 35 shirt respectively in his Serie B seasons.

=== Mantova ===
In July 2011 Girelli was signed by hometown club Mantova. The new birth Mantova returned to professional league (Lega Pro Seconda Divisione) as Serie D Group stage winner. However Girelli unable to enter the starting XI. He only able to play as a right-back in round 24, 26 and 28 due to tactical rotation (the usual right-back was Andrea Bertin) and as centre-back in round 1, 4, 21 to 23 (the usual centre-backs were Marco Zaninelli and Emanuele Fonte).

== International career ==
=== Representative team ===
Girelli was not capped for any FIGC Italy national football team at youth level. However he received a call-up from the Lega Calcio Serie C national representative team (known as Italy U-20 Serie C or just "Italy U20 C") in the 2004–05 Mirop Cup, against the representative team of Styria. He was a member of the Serie C2 Group A U-21 representative team in the 2005 Serie C Quadrangular Tournament.

== Honours ==
=== Club ===
Sassuolo

- Supercoppa di Lega di Prima Divisione: 2008
- Lega Pro Prima Divisione: 2008

=== International ===
Italy U-20 C

- Mirop Cup: 2005
