= Manuel Benetti =

Italian footballer (born 1981)

Personal information
- Date of birth: 27 January 1981 (age 45)
- Place of birth: Arzignano, Italy
- Height: 1.75 m (5 ft 9 in)
- Position: Centre back

Youth career
- Vicenza

Senior career*
Years	Team	Apps	(Gls)
2001–2002	Vicenza	0	(0)
2001–2002	→ San Marino (loan)	9	(0)
2002–2004	Monza	50	(2)
2004–2007	Sassuolo	69	(6)
2007–2008	Bassano	8	(0)
2008	→ Sassuolo (loan)	8	(0)
Total		144	(8)
- * Club domestic league appearances and goals

Manuel Benetti (born 27 January 1981) is an Italian former footballer who plays as a centre back.

== Career ==
=== Early career ===
Benetti started his professional career at Vicenza Calcio. After he spent one season on loan at San Marino Calcio, he was signed by Monza in co-ownership deal. He played 50 games for Monza, but also suspended six times.

=== Sassuolo ===
Sassuolo signed Benetti and team-mates Marco Piccioni, Filippo Pensalfini from Monza in 2004, and Vicenza retained 50% registration rights of Benetti. Sassuolo also signed Fabrizio Anselmi, Nicolò Consolini, Sebastiano Girelli and Edevaldo Grimaldi, made the defensive line highly competitive. Anselmi, Consolini, Girelli, Grimaldi and Piccioni were the key player that the team promoted. In 2004–05 Serie C2, Benetti just played 22 times (18 starts), but also played once in the return leg of the promotion playoffs. He was substituted by Consolini (who also played in the first leg).

In June 2005 Vicenza gave up the remain 50% registration rights of Benetti. Benetti only made 13 starts (in 19 appearances) in 2005–06 Serie C2. He missed the first 12 round of the season. Benetti did not play any game in the playoffs. That season the team promoted as the playoffs winner. In 2006–07 Serie C1, Benetti made 18 starts (in 28 appearances). Coach Gian Marco Remondina used Benetti and Piccioni as centre-backs in the 2007 playoffs, losing to former club Monza. In his 3 seasons with Sassuolo, Benetti was suspended 4 times. (2004–05, once) (2005–06, twice, in rescheduled round 21 and round 27), (2006–07, once)

=== Treviso ===
In July 2007 he was signed by Serie B club Treviso. Half of the registration rights was subsequently sold to Serie C2 club Bassano, which also located in Veneto. However, he only played 8 times for Bassano. In January 2008, he was swapped with Mario Stancanelli of Sassuolo. However Benetti only played 8 more times for the Emilia club. Benetti also suspended once. (He collected 3 yellow cards with Sassuolo and once with Bassano.) The team won 2007–08 Serie C1 group stage and promoted directly. Coach Massimiliano Allegri used Francesco Magnanelli and Consolini in Supercoppa di Lega di Prima Divisione, winning Salernitana to become the grand champion of the third division. In June 2008 Treviso bought back Benetti from Bassano. However, he did not have a shirt number and was released in June 2009 after the club bankrupted.

=== Serie D ===
Benetti was signed by Sarego of Eccellenza Veneto ca. 2010 (or 2009?). The team was located in the province of Vicenza. He followed the team promoted to 2011–12 Serie D.

== Honours ==
Sassuolo

- Supercoppa di Lega di Prima Divisione: 2008
- Lega Pro Prima Divisione: 2007–08
