= Alberto Pomini =

Italian footballer (born 1981)

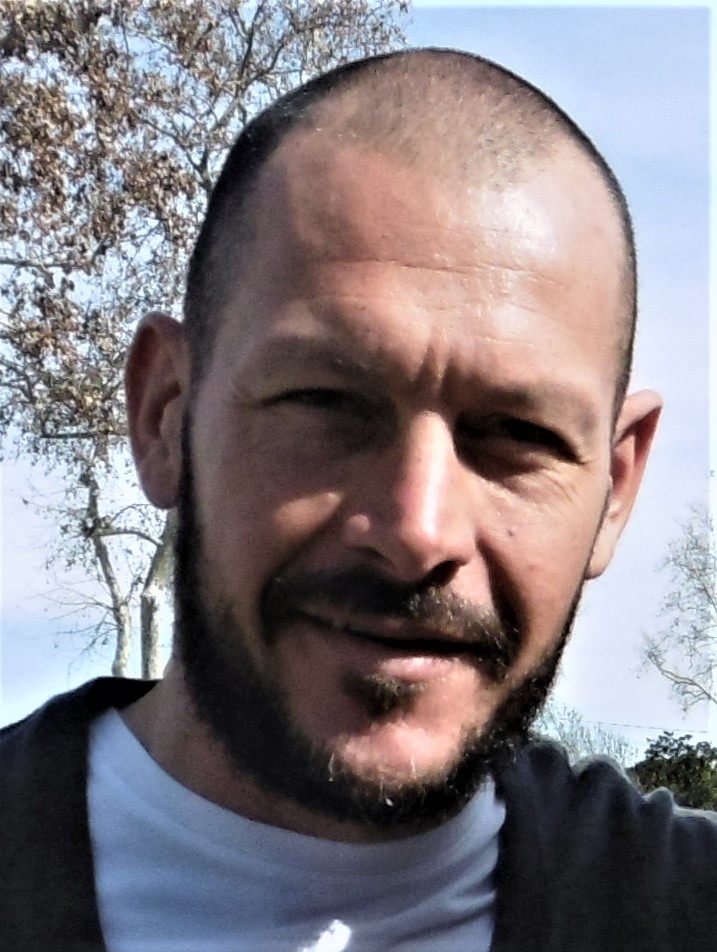

Personal information
- Date of birth: 17 March 1981 (age 45)
- Place of birth: Isola della Scala, Italy
- Height: 1.85 m (6 ft 1 in)
- Position: Goalkeeper

Youth career
- Verona

Senior career*
Years	Team	Apps	(Gls)
2001–2003	San Marino	17	(0)
2003–2004	Bellaria	20	(0)
2004–2017	Sassuolo	185	(0)
2017–2019	Palermo	32	(0)
2019–2021	Venezia	16	(0)
2021–2023	SPAL	6	(0)
Total		276	(0)
- * Club domestic league appearances and goals

Alberto Pomini (born 17 March 1981) is an Italian former footballer who played as a goalkeeper.

== Career ==
=== Early career ===
Born in Isola della Scala, Veneto, Pomini started his professional career at Verona. After graduating from Primavera under-20 reserve team in 2001, Pomini left for San Marino Calcio in co-ownership deal. In the first season he was the understudy of Fabio Fabbri. Pomini played half of the game of 2002–03 Serie C2. He shared the starting role with Giovanni Vecchini. In June 2003 Verona gave up the remain 50% registration rights to San Marino Calcio.

In mid-2003, he left for Serie C2 newcomer Bellaria – Igea Marina. Pomini played 20 games in 2003–04 Serie C2, ahead promotion protagonist Filippo Spitoni. Pomini also suspended 2 games due to send off.

=== Sassuolo ===
In mid-2004, Pomini was signed by fellow Serie C2 club Sassuolo. He was the longest serving player of the team as of 2015–16 Serie A season. Along with Nicolò Consolini, Gaetano Masucci and Marco Piccioni, they were the backbone of the squad to promote to Serie B in 2008. In the first season, Pomini shared the starting role with Gabriele Giaroli. Pomini played in the return leg of the promotion playoffs only. In the second season, Giaroli became the backup and Pomini played all four games in the promotion playoffs, which Sassuolo was the winner. In his maiden Serie C1 season, Romini was the understudy of Michael Agazzi. After Agazzi left the club in 2007, the club signed Massimiliano Benassi as first choice. The club promoted in 2007–08 Serie C1 as the grand champion.

Pomini only played once in his first Serie B season. In 2008–09 Serie B Pomini was the backup of Walter Bressan, along with Andrea Pinzan (since January 2009). Pomini was the understudy until 2010–11 Serie B, which Pomini played 23 games. Pomini also played in the playoffs round of 2009–10 Serie B, losing to Torino. In 2011–12 Serie B, Sassuolo signed former youth internationals Davide Bassi, however Pomini was able to become the first choice.

Pomini wore no.17 shirt from 2008 to 2012. In 2012, he received number 1 shirt from departing Davide Bassi.

In June 2015 he signed a new 1-year contract with Sassuolo. In May 2016 he signed a new 1-year contract again.

=== Palermo ===
In the summer of 2017, he signed for Serie B club Palermo. After starting the season behind Josip Posavec, he became the first choice by the end of the season.

He was confirmed as a reserve keeper for the club's 2018–19 campaign, with Posavec out on loan to Hajduk Split and Alberto Brignoli in as a replacement.

=== Venezia ===
On 17 July 2019, he signed a two-year contract with Venezia.

=== SPAL ===
On 27 August 2021, he joined SPAL in Serie B on a one-year contract.

== Career statistics ==
As of match played 19 May 2023

Appearances and goals by club, season and competition
Club	Season	League			National Cup		Continental		Other		Total	
Club	Season	Division	Apps	Goals	Apps	Goals	Apps	Goals	Apps	Goals	Apps	Goals
San Marino	2001–02	Serie C2	0	0	—		—		—		0	0
San Marino	2002–03	Serie C2	17	0	—		—		—		17	0
San Marino	Total		17	0	—		—		—		17	0
Bellaria	2003–04	Serie C2	20	0	—		—		—		20	0
Sassuolo	2004–05	Serie C2	16	0	—		—		1	0	17	0
Sassuolo	2005–06	Serie C2	22	0	—		—		4	0	26	0
Sassuolo	2006–07	Serie C1	14	0	0	0	—		0	0	14	0
Sassuolo	2007–08	Serie C1	11	0	0	0	—		1	0	12	0
Sassuolo	2008–09	Serie B	1	0	1	0	—		—		2	0
Sassuolo	2009–10	Serie B	5	0	1	0	—		2	0	8	0
Sassuolo	2010–11	Serie B	23	0	2	0	—		—		25	0
Sassuolo	2011–12	Serie B	42	0	2	0	—		2	0	46	0
Sassuolo	2012–13	Serie B	41	0	2	0	—		—		43	0
Sassuolo	2013–14	Serie A	3	0	1	0	—		—		4	0
Sassuolo	2014–15	Serie A	4	0	3	0	—		—		7	0
Sassuolo	2015–16	Serie A	0	0	0	0	—		—		0	0
Sassuolo	2016–17	Serie A	0	0	0	0	0	0	—		0	0
Sassuolo	Total		182	0	12	0	0	0	10	0	204	0
Palermo	2017–18	Serie B	23	0	0	0	—		4	0	27	0
Palermo	2018–19	Serie B	5	0	0	0	—		—		5	0
Palermo	Total		28	0	0	0	—		4	0	32	0
Venezia	2019–20	Serie B	4	0	0	0	—		—		4	0
Venezia	2020–21	Serie B	12	0	0	0	—		2	0	14	0
Venezia	Total		16	0	0	0	—		2	0	18	0
SPAL	2021–22	Serie B	3	0	0	0	—		—		3	0
SPAL	2022–23	Serie B	3	0	0	0	—		—		3	0
SPAL	Total		6	0	0	0	—		—		6	0
Career total			269	0	12	0	0	0	16	0	297	0

== Honours ==
- Supercoppa di Lega di Prima Divisione: 2008 (Sassuolo)
  - Lega Pro Prima Divisione: 2008 (Sassuolo)
