= Gaetano Masucci =

Italian footballer

Personal information
- Full name: Gaetano Vittor Masucci
- Date of birth: 26 October 1984 (age 42)
- Place of birth: Avellino, Italy
- Height: 1.73 m (5 ft 8 in)
- Position: Winger

Youth career
- 1998–2004: Torino

Senior career*
Years	Team	Apps	(Gls)
2004–2014	Sassuolo	228	(40)
2011	→ Frosinone (loan)	18	(4)
2014–2015	Frosinone	14	(1)
2015–2017	Virtus Entella	70	(17)
2017–2024	Pisa	198	(32)
Total		528	(94)
- * Club domestic league appearances and goals

Gaetano Masucci (born 26 October 1984) is an Italian former professional footballer who plays as a winger.

== Career ==
=== Torino ===
Born in Avellino, Campania, Masucci started his career at northern club Torino Calcio. In 2001–02 season he was the member of Berretti under-20 reserve team, the B team of the under-20 age group (usually U19 or U18 team). In 2003–04 season Masucci played a few games for Primavera under-20 reserve team. Masucci also played for Berretti in the playoffs that season.

=== Sassuolo ===
Masucci graduated from the reserve in June 2004. That transfer window he was signed by Serie C2 team Sassuolo. The team also signed numbers of player that season, which some of them became the protagonist for the promotion from Serie C2 to Serie B in 2008. As of 2011–12 season, Masucci, Nicolò Consolini, Marco Piccioni and Alberto Pomini were the only four players from the original 2004–05 squad plus Francesco Magnanelli who already played for the Emilia team since 2005.

2004–2008

Masucci was the starting forward in promotion playoffs in 2005 (partnering Andreini; substituted by Gilioli in the return leg), 2006, 2007 (in 4–3–3 formation: Erpen–Selva–Masucci). In 2008 Sassuolo finished as the first in the Group A of 2007–08 Serie C1 and won the 2008 Supercoppa di Lega di Prima Divisione to become the grand champion of the third division. However Masucci did not play. Masucci scored 9 goals in 2007–08 season. As Masucci sometimes wore no.7 before the team had a fix number in 2008 (but also wore no.11), Masucci sometimes incorrectly known as midfielder, as the line-up in the news usually listed players in alphabetical order (from 1 to 11) or according to position (from keeper, defender, midfielder to forward). Masucci also wore no.7 shirt since the team had a fix number in Serie B.

2008–11

Masucci scored 4 times in 2008–09 Serie B. He made 23 starts that season. In the next season Masucci made 18 starts, in the 4–3–3 formation. In the promotion playoffs the forwards were Quadrini – Martinetti – Noselli (Zampagna) in 4–3–3 formation. Coach Stefano Pioli also used 4–3–1–2 formation when Masucci was not available in whole October 2009. Masucci signed a new 2-year deal in September 2010. With Sassuolo in the first half of 2010–11 Serie B, coach Daniele Arrigoni and Angelo Gregucci and stick with 4–3–3, but Masucci lost his starting place in early November

Frosinone

After half season with 11 starts, Masucci left for fellow Serie B club Frosinone on 28 January 2011, along with Gianluigi Bianco. On the same day Antonio Bocchetti also joined Sassuolo in temporary deal but later as a replacement of Mauro Minelli who left for Frosinone on 31 January.. Masucci chose no.7 again with Frosinone. In his 5 months stay, he made 17 starts as first as a wing forward 4–3–3 formation. Since round 37, coach Salvatore Campilongo changed back to original 4–4–2 formation and Masucci usually was the right midfielder of the team Frosinone relegated at the end of season.

2012–2013

Under Fulvio Pea, Masucci made 12 starts before the winter break. He only played twice after the winter break.

2012–2013

He won promotion to Serie A in 2013.

2013–2014

In his only Serie A season, Masucci played 13 times.

=== Frosinone ===
On 3 July 2014 Masucci was signed by Serie B club Frosinone Calcio in a 2-year contract.

=== Entella ===
On 2 February 2015 he was signed by Entella.

=== Final years at Pisa ===
On 26 January 2017 he was transferred to Pisa, signing a contract until June 2019. Two days later he scored on his debut in the Nerazzurri’s 1–1 draw away to Novara. In the summer of 2019 he renewed his contract with the club for a further three years.

He remained with the Tuscan club until the 2023–24 season, after which he retired.

=== After retirement ===
In the summer of 2024 he was admitted to the UEFA B coaching course, which allows registration as a staff collaborator in Serie A and B, work as an assistant coach in Serie C, and the ability to coach any first team up to Serie D. After also obtaining the sporting director qualification, in September 2024 he joined the management staff of Sestri Levante, a Serie C club from Liguria, as a collaborator in the technical area.

== Personal life ==
On 21 June 2011 he married Livia Colucci in the church of Baiano.

== Honours ==
Sassuolo

- Serie C1: 2007–08
- Supercoppa di Serie C1: 2008

Pisa

- Lega Pro: 2015–16, 2018–19
