= 2013–14 US Sassuolo Calcio season =

Sassuolo
2013–14 season
- President: Carlo Rossi
- Manager: Eusebio Di Francesco
- Stadium: Mapei Stadium – Città del Tricolore
- Serie A: 17th
- Coppa Italia: Fourth round
- Top goalscorer: League: Domenico Berardi (16); All: Domenico Berardi (16)
Home colours	Away colours	Third colours

The 2013–14 season was Unione Sportiva Sassuolo Calcio's first ever season in Serie A after having been promoted at the end of the 2012–13 season. The club struggled throughout the season and finished 17th, avoiding relegation. They were eliminated from the Coppa Italia in the fourth round.

== Players ==
Note: Flags indicate national team as defined under FIFA eligibility rules; some limited exceptions apply. Players may hold more than one non-FIFA nationality.

No.	Pos.	Nation	Player
1	GK	(Italy) ITA	Alberto Pomini (vice-captain)
2	DF	(Italy) ITA	Raffaele Pucino
3	DF	(Italy) ITA	Alessandro Longhi
4	MF	(Italy) ITA	Francesco Magnanelli (captain)
5	DF	(Italy) ITA	Luca Antei
6	DF	(Italy) ITA	Lorenzo Ariaudo
7	MF	(Italy) ITA	Simone Missiroli
8	MF	(Italy) ITA	Luca Marrone (on loan from Juventus)
9	FW	(Italy) ITA	Sergio Floccari
10	FW	(Italy) ITA	Simone Zaza
11	FW	(Romania) ROU	Marius Alexe (on loan from Dinamo București)
14	FW	(Italy) ITA	Gaetano Masucci
15	DF	(Italy) ITA	Francesco Acerbi
16	MF	(Italy) ITA	Davide Biondini
17	FW	(Italy) ITA	Nicola Sansone
19	MF	(Colombia) COL	Alexis Zapata (on loan from Udinese)

No.	Pos.	Nation	Player
20	DF	(Italy) ITA	Paolo Bianco
21	MF	(Italy) ITA	Thomas Manfredini
22	MF	(Italy) ITA	Matteo Brighi
23	DF	(Italy) ITA	Marcello Gazzola
25	FW	(Italy) ITA	Domenico Berardi
26	DF	(Italy) ITA	Emanuele Terranova
28	DF	(Italy) ITA	Paolo Cannavaro
33	DF	(Portugal) POR	Pedro Mendes (on loan from Parma)
45	MF	(Ghana) GHA	Raman Chibsah
70	FW	(Brazil) BRA	Diego Farias (on loan from Chievo)
79	GK	(Italy) ITA	Gianluca Pegolo
83	FW	(Italy) ITA	Antonio Floro Flores
86	DF	(Switzerland) SUI	Reto Ziegler (on loan from Juventus)
87	DF	(Italy) ITA	Aleandro Rosi (on loan from Parma)
96	FW	(Paraguay) PAR	Antonio Sanabria
99	GK	(Italy) ITA	Ciro Polito

== Competitions ==
=== Overall ===
Competition	Started round	Current position	Final position	First match	Last match
Serie A	Matchday 1	—	17th	25 August 2013	18 May 2014
Coppa Italia	Third round	—	Fourth round	17 August 2013	4 December 2013

Last updated: 18 May 2014

=== Serie A ===
==== League table ====
Pos	Team	Pld	W	D	L	GF	GA	GD	Pts	Qualification or relegation
15	Cagliari	38	9	12	17	34	53	−19	39	
16	Chievo	38	10	6	22	34	54	−20	36	
17	Sassuolo	38	9	7	22	43	72	−29	34	
18	Catania (R)	38	8	8	22	34	66	−32	32	Relegation to Serie B
19	Bologna (R)	38	5	14	19	28	58	−30	29	Relegation to Serie B

Source: Serie A, Soccerway
Rules for classification: 1st points; 2nd head-to-head points; 3rd head-to-head goal difference; 4th goal difference; 5th number of goals scored; 6th public draw.
(Head-to-head record is applied for clubs with the same number of points only once all matches between said clubs have been played)
(R) Relegated

==== Matches ====
25 August 2013 1	Torino	2–0	Sassuolo	Turin
20:45 CEST (UTC+02:00)	Brighi 40'; Farnerud (yellow card) 43'; Cerci 63'; Glik (yellow card) 69'; Immobile (yellow card) 81'	Report	Farias (yellow card) 65'; Gazzola (yellow card) 85'	Stadium: Stadio Olimpico di Torino; Attendance: 13,418; Referee: Daniele Orsato

1 September 2013 2	Sassuolo	1–4	Livorno	Reggio Emilia
20:45 CEST (UTC+02:00)	Zaza 66'; Rosati (yellow card) 84'	Report	Greco 43', (yellow card) 60'; Rosati 69' (o.g.); Paulinho 74'; Emeghara 85' (pen.)	Stadium: Mapei Stadium – Città del Tricolore; Attendance: 9,929; Referee: Paolo Mazzoleni

15 September 2013 3	Hellas Verona	2–0	Sassuolo	Verona
15:00 CEST (UTC+02:00)	Martinho 12'; Bianchetti (yellow card) 35'; Rômulo (yellow card) 40', (goal) 90+3'; Janković (yellow card) 87'	Report	Gazzola (yellow card) 73'	Stadium: Stadio Marc'Antonio Bentegodi; Attendance: 18,433; Referee: Massimiliano Irrati

22 September 2013 4	Sassuolo	0–7	Internazionale	Reggio Emilia
12:30 CEST (UTC+02:00)	Magnanelli (yellow card) 13'; Missiroli (yellow card) 22'; Bianco (yellow card) 90'	Report	Palacio 7'; Taïder (yellow card) 16', (goal) 23'; Pucino 33' (o.g.); Álvarez 53'; Milito 63', 83'; Cambiasso 74'	Stadium: Mapei Stadium – Città del Tricolore; Referee: Carmine Russo

5	v

6	v

7	v

8	v

9	v

10	v

11	v

12	v

13	v

14	v

15	v

16	v

17	v

18	v

19	v

20	v

21	v

22	v

23	v

24	v

25	v

26	v

27	v

28	v

29	v

30	v

31	v

32	v

33	v

34	v

35	v

36	v

37	v

38	v
