= Davide Bassi =

Italian footballer (born 1985)

Personal information
- Date of birth: 12 April 1985 (age 41)
- Place of birth: Sarzana, Italy
- Height: 1.90 m (6 ft 3 in)
- Position: Goalkeeper

Youth career
- 2002–2003: Empoli

Senior career*
Years	Team	Apps	(Gls)
2003–2005	Massese	54	(0)
2005–2015	Empoli	185	(0)
2005–2006	→ Massese (loan)	29	(0)
2010–2011	→ Torino (loan)	16	(0)
2011–2012	→ Sassuolo (loan)	0	(0)
2015–2017	Atalanta	1	(0)
2017	Parma	4	(0)
2017–2019	Spezia	3	(0)
Total		292	(0)

International career
2008	Italy U23	3	(0)
- * Club domestic league appearances and goals

Davide Bassi (born 12 April 1985) is an Italian former professional footballer who played as a goalkeeper.

== Club career ==
Born in Sarzana, Liguria, Bassi was a product of Empoli's youth system, joining the team in 2002, but started his professional career at Tuscan club Massese in 2003. In 2005, he returned to Empoli in a co-ownership deal. Bassi formally returned to Empoli on 1 July 2006. He became the team's first-choice goalkeeper, ahead of Daniele Balli, during the second half of the 2007–08 Serie A season. After the team were relegated, he remained as the first-choice keeper. During the 2010–11 Serie B season, he left for Torino, to replace the recently departed Matteo Sereni. Empoli signed Jasmin Handanović to replace Bassi.

In July 2011, he left on loan for Sassuolo, but served as an understudy to Alberto Pomini.

In July 2013, Bassi changed his shirt number to no.28. He was the team's first choice goalkeeper during the 2013–14 Serie B season. However, the next year, he was a backup to Luigi Sepe during the 2014–15 Serie A season.

=== Atalanta ===
On 27 June 2015, Bassi signed a two-year contract with Serie A club Atalanta B.C. on a free transfer.

In January 2017, Bassi was released.

=== Parma ===
On 1 March 2017, Bassi was signed by Lega Pro club Parma on a free transfer, as an emergency signing to replace injured Pierluigi Frattali. However, on 3 April he was released again, due to the recovery of Frattali, as well as Parma ran out of quota to keep in their 25-men squad list. Bassi was the starting keeper for the Emilian club in March, with 1 win, 2 draws and 1 loss, conceding 4 goals. The match played on 2 April, Bassi was the backup of Frattali.

=== Spezia ===
Bassi joined Spezia on 10 July 2017.

== International career ==
Bassi was never capped for Italy at international level until the 2008 Toulon Tournament. The coach rested the regular starters of the under-21 team, and instead picked Bassi and Enrico Alfonso. They both shared the first-choice goalkeeping role, as Italy went on to win the tournament. However, despite his success, Bassi did not go on to represent the under-23 side at the Beijing Olympics that summer.

== Career statistics ==
Appearances and goals by club, season and competition
Club	Season	League			National cup		Europe		Other		Total	
Club	Season	Division	Apps	Goals	Apps	Goals	Apps	Goals	Apps	Goals	Apps	Goals
Massese	2003–04	Serie D	31	0	2	0	—		5	0	36	0
Massese	2004–05	Serie C2	23	0	6	0	—		—		29	0
Massese	Total		54	0	8	0	—		5	0	2	0
Empoli	2006–07	Serie A	8	0	4	0	—		—		12	0
Empoli	2007–08	Serie A	17	0	2	0	2	0	—		21	0
Empoli	2008–09	Serie B	42	0	4	0	—		2	0	48	0
Empoli	2009–10	Serie B	39	0	2	0	—		—		41	0
Empoli	2012–13	Serie B	30	0	0	0	—		4	0	34	0
Empoli	2013–14	Serie B	42	0	2	0	—		—		44	0
Empoli	2014–15	Serie A	7	0	2	0	—		—		9	0
Empoli	Total		185	0	16	0	2	0	6	0	209	0
Massese (loan)	2005–06	Serie C1	29	0	1	0	—		2	0	32	0
Torino (loan)	2010–11	Serie B	16	0	1	0	—		—		17	0
Sassuolo (loan)	2011–12	Serie B	0	0	0	0	—		0	0	0	0
Atalanta	2015–16	Serie A	1	0	1	0	—		—		2	0
Atalanta	2016–17	Serie A	0	0	0	0	—		—		0	0
Atalanta	Total		1	0	1	0	—		—		2	0
Parma	2016–17	Lega Pro	4	0	—		—		—		4	0
Spezia	2017–18	Série B	3	0	2	0	—		—		5	0
Career total			292	0	29	0	2	0	13	0	336	0

== Honours ==
Individual

- Toulon Tournament Best Goalkeeper: 2008
