= Giovanni Fietta =

Italian professional footballer

Personal information
- Date of birth: 14 November 1984 (age 41)
- Place of birth: Asolo, Italy
- Height: 1.81 m (5 ft 11 1/2 in)
- Position: Midfielder

Youth career
- Treviso

Senior career*
Years	Team	Apps	(Gls)
2003–2008	Treviso	35	(0)
2003–2004	→ Ivrea (loan)	33	(2)
2005–2006	→ Pizzighettone (loan)	19	(1)
2007–2008	→ Spezia (loan)	11	(0)
2008–2013	Cremonese	109	(5)
2013–2017	Como	95	(1)
2017–2018	Renate	17	(0)
2018–2024	Pro Patria	147	(3)
- * Club domestic league appearances and goals

Giovanni Fietta (born 14 November 1984) is an Italian former professional footballer who played as a midfielder.

== Club career ==
=== Treviso ===
Born in Asolo, in the Province of Treviso, Veneto, Fietta was a youth product of Treviso Football Club. He won the promotion to Serie B in 2003. However Treviso loaned Fietta back to lower divisions, for Serie C2 club Ivrea. Fietta returned to Treviso in 2004, which he briefly played in 2004–05 Serie B season. In 2005, he left the club again, for Serie C1 club Pizzighettone in co-ownership deal. Treviso also relegated in 2005–06 Serie A season. in June 2006 Pizzighettone purchased Fietta outright for undisclosed fee, however in July 2006 Treviso bought Fietta back for €45,000. That season he made 24 Serie B appearances. In July 2007, Fietta, Marco Zaninelli and Alfonso Camorani were signed by fellow Serie B club Spezia in temporary deal.

=== Cremonese ===
In January 2008 Fietta was signed by the third division club Cremonese in another co-ownership deal, for €170,000. In June 2009 Treviso bought back Fietta. However, due to the bankruptcy of Treviso, Fietta returned to Cremonese on a free transfer. On 16 July 2012 Fietta signed a new 1-year contract with the Lombard side.

=== Como ===
On 1 July 2013 Fietta became a free agent. On 3 September 2013 he was signed by the third division club Como in 2-year contract. Como finished as the losing quarter-finalists in the promotion playoffs.

=== Pro Patria ===
On 10 July 2018, he joined Serie C club Pro Patria.

== Honours ==
- Serie C1: 2003 (Treviso)
