= 2004–05 Serie C1 =

Annual soccer tournament

The 2004–05 Serie C1 was the twenty-seventh edition of Serie C1, the third highest league in the Italian football league system.

Initially, FIGC banned Como F.C. but the club then won the trial and was reinstated as special guest.

== Overview ==
=== Serie C1/A ===
It was contested by 19 teams, and U.S. Cremonese won the championship. It was decided that U.S. Cremonese, A.C. Mantova was promoted to Serie B, and A.S. Andria BAT, F.C. Vittoria, Calcio Como, A.C. Prato was demoted in Serie C2.

=== Serie C1/B ===
It was contested by 18 teams, and Rimini Calcio F.C. won the championship. It was decided that Rimini Calcio F.C., U.S. Avellino was promoted to Serie B, and A.C. Reggiana 1919, Benevento Calcio, SPAL 1907, A.S. Sora, A.S.D. Nuova Vis Pesaro Calcio 2006 was demoted to Serie C2.

== League standings ==
=== Group A ===
Pos	Team	Pld	W	D	L	GF	GA	GD	Pts	Promotion or relegation
1	Cremonese (P)	36	22	6	8	58	36	+22	72	Promoted to Serie B
2	Mantova (O, P)	36	18	10	8	45	25	+20	64	Playoffs
3	Grosseto	36	17	13	6	35	17	+18	64	Playoffs
4	Pavia	36	18	10	8	47	31	+16	64	Playoffs
5	Frosinone	36	17	8	11	42	39	+3	59	Playoffs
6	Pistoiese	36	15	11	10	42	31	+11	56	
7	Spezia	36	13	13	10	46	38	+8	52	
8	Sangiovannese	36	13	11	12	40	32	+8	50	
9	Pisa	36	11	14	11	35	31	+4	47	
10	Pro Patria	36	10	15	11	39	37	+2	45	
11	Lucchese	36	10	14	12	36	44	−8	44	
12	Lumezzane	36	11	11	14	29	39	−10	44	
13	Torres	36	10	12	14	36	43	−7	42	
14	Acireale	36	9	15	12	34	41	−7	42	
15	Novara	36	9	13	14	33	43	−10	40	Relegation play-off
16	Fidelis Andria (E, R)	36	6	16	14	24	39	−15	34 (Note: Despite winning their play-out, Fidelis Andria were relegated to Serie C2 after declaring bankruptcy.)	Rel.p/off then phoenix in Serie C2
17	Vittoria (R)	36	6	12	18	24	40	−16	30	Relegation play-off
18	Como (G, R, E)	36	7	14	15	33	46	−13	29 (Note: Como were deducted 6 points, then later suffered a double relegation to Serie D due to declaring bankruptcy and going out of business.)	Rel.p/off then phoenix in Serie D
19	Prato (R)	36	7	8	21	29	55	−26	29	Relegation to Serie C2

Source: Panini
(E) Eliminated; (G) Guests; (O) Play-off winners; (P) Promoted; (R) Relegated

==== Play-off ====
===== Quarter-finals =====
Location and date	Team 1	Score	Team 2
Frosinone, 29 May 2005	Frosinone	2–4	Mantova
Mantova, 5 June 2005	Mantova	1–0	Frosinone
Grosseto, 29 May 2005	Grosseto	1–1	Pavia
Pavia, 5 June 2005	Pavia	2–0	Grosseto

===== Final =====
Location and date	Team 1	Score	Team 2
Pavia, 12 June 2006	Pavia	1–3	Mantova
Mantova, 19 June 2006	Mantova	3–0	Pavia

==== Play-out ====
Location and date	Team 1	Score	Team 2
Como, 29 May 2005	Como	1–2	Novara
Novara, 5 June 2005	Novara	0–0	Como
Vittoria, 29 May 2005	Vittoria	1–1	Fidelis Andria
Andria, 5 June 2005	Fidelis Andria	1–1	Vittoria

=== Group B ===
Pos	Team	Pld	W	D	L	GF	GA	GD	Pts	Promotion or relegation
1	Rimini (P, C)	34	19	13	2	50	23	+27	70	Promoted to Serie B
2	Avellino (O, P)	34	18	10	6	48	29	+19	64	Playoffs
3	Napoli	34	17	10	7	45	31	+14	61	Playoffs
4	Sambenedettese	34	14	12	8	38	25	+13	54	Playoffs
5	Reggiana (E, R)	34	13	15	6	41	24	+17	51 (Note: Reggiana were deducted 3 points, then relegated to Serie C2 after declaring bankruptcy.)	Playoffs then phoenix in Serie C2
6	Padova	34	13	9	12	46	39	+7	48	
7	Lanciano	34	12	10	12	36	38	−2	46	
8	Benevento (E, R)	34	11	12	11	31	38	−7	45 (Note: Benevento were relegated to Serie C2 after declaring bankruptcy.)	Phoenix in Serie C2
9	SPAL (E, R)	34	10	13	11	36	33	+3	43 (Note: SPAL were relegated to Serie C2 after declaring bankruptcy.)	Phoenix in Serie C2
10	Foggia	34	9	15	10	36	35	+1	42	
11	Martina	34	10	12	12	31	41	−10	42	
12	Cittadella	34	9	14	11	36	37	−1	41	
13	Teramo	34	9	13	12	32	37	−5	40	
14	Fermana	34	10	9	15	30	45	−15	39	Relegation play-off (annulled)
15	Sora (R, E, R, R, R, R)	34	8	12	14	35	42	−7	34 (Note: Sora were deducted 2 points, then relegated to Serie C2 and declared bankruptcy. It was substituted by a local First Category team.)	Lost the play-out and went bankrupt
16	Giulianova	34	7	10	17	20	43	−23	31	Relegation play-off (annulled)
17	Chieti (T)	34	5	15	14	19	32	−13	30	Lost the playout but were later restored
18	Vis Pesaro (R, E, R, R)	34	5	10	19	21	39	−18	25	Phoenix in Promozione

Source: Panini
(C) Champions; (E) Eliminated; (O) Play-off winners; (P) Promoted; (R) Relegated; (T) Qualified, but not yet for the particular phase indicated

==== Play-off ====
===== Semifinal =====
Location and date	Team 1	Score	Team 2
San Benedetto del Tronto, 29 May 2005	Sambenedettese	1–1	Napoli
Naples, June 5, 2005	Napoli	2–0	Sambenedettese
Cremona, 29 May 2005	Reggiana	1–2	Avellino
Avellino, 5 June 2005	Avellino	2–2	Reggiana

===== Final =====
Location and date	Team 1	Score	Team 2
Naples, 12 June 2006	Napoli	0–0	Avellino
Avellino, 19 June 2006	Avellino	2–1	Napoli

==== Play-out ====
Later annulled for general bankruptcy

Location and date	Team 1	Score	Team 2
Chieti, 29 May 2005	Chieti	0–0	Fermana
Fermo, 5 June 2005	Fermana	1–1	Chieti
Giulianova, 29 May 2005	Giulianova	1–0	Sora
Sora, 5 June 2005	Sora	1–3	Giulianova

== Supercup ==
2005	Rimini	5–2	Cremonese	Stadio Romeo Neri, Rimini
2005	Cremonese	2–4	Rimini	Stadio Giovanni Zini, Cremona
2005	Rimini (group B) won 9–4 on aggregate
