= Zaninelli (surname) =

Zaninelli is a surname. Notable people with the surname include:

- Luigi Zaninelli (born 1932), Italian-American composer
- Marco Zaninelli (born 1977), Italian footballer
- Sergio Zaninelli (1929–2025), Italian academic
- Silvio Zaninelli (1913–1979), American football player
