= Donazzan =

Donazzan is an Italian surname. Notable people with the surname include:

- Elena Donazzan (born 1972), Italian politician
- Nicola Donazzan (born 1985), Italian footballer
