= Francesco Magnanelli =

Italian footballer

Personal information
- Full name: Francesco Magnanelli
- Date of birth: 12 November 1984 (age 41)
- Place of birth: Umbertide, Italy
- Height: 1.77 m (5 ft 10 in)
- Position: Defensive midfielder

Team information
- Current team: AC Milan (assistant)

Senior career*
Years	Team	Apps	(Gls)
2000–2002	Gubbio	15	(0)
2002–2003	Chievo	0	(0)
2003–2004	Fiorentina	0	(0)
2004–2005	Sangiovannese	7	(0)
2005–2022	Sassuolo	448	(8)
Total		470	(8)
- * Club domestic league appearances and goals

Francesco Magnanelli (born 12 November 1984) is an Italian football coach and former player. Since August 2024, he has been the head coach of Juventus's under-20 side.

A midfielder in his playing days, he is the all-time record appearance holder for Sassuolo.

== Playing career ==
Throughout his club career, Magnanelli has played for several Italian sides: he began his career with Gubbio in 2000, and later played for Chievo, Fiorentina, and Sangiovannese, before joining Sassuolo in 2005, where he helped the team from Serie C2 to Serie A promotion; he won the Serie C1 and Serie B titles with the club in 2008 and 2013 respectively, and was later named the team's captain. In June 2015 he signed a new two-year contract with Sassuolo.

On 29 October 2019, Magnanelli was given a one-match ban for blasphemy during Serie A matches. Italy has a strict ban on taking God's name in vain.

On 19 May 2022, Magnanelli announced his retirement from playing at the end of the season.

== Style of play ==
Magnanelli has been described as a talented, purposeful, humble and hard-working midfielder. He is usually deployed in the centre and is known in particular for his leadership and passing range, as well as his tactical awareness and reading of the game, in addition to his tenacity and ability to win back possession or intercept passes as a defensive midfielder.

== Coaching career ==
After retirement, Magnanelli stayed at Sassuolo as part of Alessio Dionisi's first team coaching staff.

He left Sassuolo in the summer of 2023 to rejoin Massimiliano Allegri, a former manager of his, as his technical collaborator at Juventus. Since then, he has been hailed as a key appointment for the Bianconeri due to his fresh tactical ideas that were deemed as reminiscent of the playing style of Roberto De Zerbi, another former coach of his at Sassuolo, and for having pushed towards different and more modern playing strategies involving key players such as Federico Chiesa and Dušan Vlahović.

== Career statistics ==
Appearances and goals by club, season and competition
Club	Season	League			National Cup		Continental		Other		Total	
Club	Season	Division	Apps	Goals	Apps	Goals	Apps	Goals	Apps	Goals	Apps	Goals
Sangiovannese	2004–05	Serie C	7	0	0	0	—		—		7	0
Sassuolo	2006–07	Serie C	21	1	1	0	—		2	0	24	1
Sassuolo	2007–08	Serie C	29	1	0	0	—		2	0	31	1
Sassuolo	2008–09	Serie B	37	0	1	0	—		—		38	0
Sassuolo	2009–10	Serie B	38	0	2	0	—		2	0	42	0
Sassuolo	2010–11	Serie B	39	2	1	0	—		—		40	2
Sassuolo	2011–12	Serie B	36	0	2	0	—		1	0	39	0
Sassuolo	2012–13	Serie B	40	1	2	0	—		—		42	1
Sassuolo	2013–14	Serie A	28	0	0	0	—		—		28	0
Sassuolo	2014–15	Serie A	29	1	2	0	—		—		31	1
Sassuolo	2015–16	Serie A	34	1	1	0	—		—		35	1
Sassuolo	2016–17	Serie A	15	1	0	0	9	0	—		24	1
Sassuolo	2017–18	Serie A	32	0	2	0	—		—		34	0
Sassuolo	2018–19	Serie A	26	0	2	1	—		—		28	1
Sassuolo	2019–20	Serie A	22	0	0	0	—		—		22	0
Sassuolo	2020–21	Serie A	10	0	0	0	—		—		10	0
Sassuolo	2021–22	Serie A	12	0	1	0	—		—		13	0
Sassuolo	Total		448	8	17	1	9	0	7	0	481	9
Career total			455	8	17	1	9	0	7	0	488	9

== Honours ==
Sassuolo

- Serie C1: 2007–08
- Supercoppa di Lega di Serie C1: 2008
- Serie B: 2012–13
