= 2006–07 Serie C1 =

Italian football league season

Geographical distribution of 2006-07 Serie C1 teams. Serie C1/A teams are depicted with red dots, whereas Serie C1/B ones were represented with yellow.

The 2006–07 Serie C1 was the twenty-ninth edition of Serie C1, the third highest league in the Italian football league system. It was divided into two phases: the regular season, played from 3 September 2006, to 13 May 2007, and the playoff phase. Once the regular season was over teams placed 2nd to 5th entered a playoff to determine the second team in each division to be promoted to Serie B. At the same time, teams placed 14th to 17th entered a playout for the right to remain in Serie C1 the following season.

As usual, Serie C1 was composed by two divisions, whose teams were divided geographically. Division C1/A was mainly composed by Northern Italy teams, whereas Division C1/B included mostly Central and Southern Italy teams. No teams from the major islands of Sardinia or Sicily took part in the 2006–07 Serie C1, as the only two eligible to participate in it, Gela and Sassari Torres, were both omitted due to financial troubles.

Teams finishing first in the regular season, plus one team winning the playoff round from each division were promoted to Serie B; teams finishing last in the regular season, plus two relegation playoff losers from each division were relegated to Serie C2. In all, four teams were promoted to Serie B, and six teams were relegated to Serie C2.

== Clubs ==
=== Serie C1/A ===
Club	City	Stadium	2005/2006 Season
A.S. Cittadella	Cittadella	Stadio Pier Cesare Tombolato	6th in Serie C1/A
U.S. Cremonese	Cremona	Stadio Giovanni Zini	21st in Serie B
U.S. Grosseto F.C.	Grosseto	Stadio Carlo Zecchini	3rd in Serie C1/B
U.S. Ivrea Calcio	Ivrea	Stadio Gino Pistoni	Serie C2/A Playoff Winners
A.S. Lucchese-Libertas	Lucca	Stadio Porta Elisa	7th in Serie C1/B
U.S. Massese 1919	Massa	Stadio Dino Manuzzi	16th in Serie C1/B
A.C. Monza Brianza 1912	Monza	Stadio Brianteo	3rd in Serie C1/A
Novara Calcio	Novara	Stadio Silvio Piola	8th in Serie C1/A
Calcio Padova	Padova	Stadio Euganeo	9th in Serie C1/A
A.C. Pavia	Pavia	Stadio Pietro Fortunati	4th in Serie C1/A
Pisa Calcio	Pisa	Arena Garibaldi - Romeo Anconetani	15th in Serie C1/B
A.C. Pistoiese	Pistoia	Stadio Marcello Melani	9th in Serie C1/B
AS Pizzighettone	Pizzighettone	Stadio Comunale	11th in Serie C1/A
Pro Patria	Busto Arsizio	Stadio Carlo Speroni	10th in Serie C1/A
A.C. Pro Sesto	Sesto San Giovanni	Stadio Breda	14th in Serie C1/A
A.C. Sangiovannese 1927	San Giovanni Valdarno	Stadio Virgilio Fedini	5th in Serie C1/B
U.S. Sassuolo Calcio	Sassuolo	Stadio Enzo Ricci	Serie C2/B Playoff Winners
S.S.C. Venezia	Venice	Stadio Pier Luigi Penzo	Serie C2/A Champions

=== Serie C1/B ===
Club	City	Stadium	2005/2006 Season
A.C. Ancona	Ancona	Stadio del Conero	5th in Serie C2/A
U.S. Avellino	Avellino	Stadio Partenio	19th in Serie B
S.S. Cavese 1919	Cava de' Tirreni	Stadio Simonetta Lamberti	Serie C2/B Champions
U.S. Foggia	Foggia	Stadio Pino Zaccheria	13th in Serie C1/B
Gallipoli Calcio	Gallipoli	Stadio Antonio Bianco	Serie C2/C Champions
Giulianova Calcio	Giulianova	Stadio Rubens Fadini	12th in Serie C1/A
S.S. Juve Stabia	Castellammare di Stabia	Stadio Romeo Menti	17th in Serie C1/B
S.S. Lanciano	Lanciano	Stadio Guido Biondi	11th in Serie C1/B
S.S. Manfredonia Calcio	Manfredonia	Stadio Miramare	10th in Serie C1/B
A.C. Martina	Martina Franca	Stadio Gian Domenico Tursi	8th in Serie C1/B
Perugia Calcio	Perugia	Stadio Renato Curi	6th in Serie C1/B
Ravenna Calcio	Ravenna	Stadio Bruno Benelli	13th in Serie C1/A
Salernitana Calcio 1919	Salerno	Stadio Arechi	5th in Serie C1/A
S.S. Sambenedettese Calcio	San Benedetto del Tronto	Stadio Carlo Speroni	15th in Serie C1/A
San Marino Calcio	Serravalle, San Marino	Stadio Olimpico	16th in Serie C1/A
Taranto Sport	Taranto	Stadio Erasmo Iacovone	Serie C2/C Playoff Winners
Teramo Calcio	Teramo	Stadio Comunale	7th in Serie C1/A
Ternana Calcio	Terni	Stadio Libero Liberati	20th in Serie B

== Final standings ==
=== Serie C1/A ===
Pos	Team	Pld	W	D	L	GF	GA	GD	Pts	Promotion or relegation
1	Grosseto (C, P)	34	16	14	4	46	27	+19	62	Promoted to Serie B
2	Sassuolo	34	17	10	7	42	27	+15	61	Lost in promotion playoffs
3	Pisa (P)	34	15	13	6	32	20	+12	58	Won promotion playoffs
4	Venezia	34	14	12	8	41	29	+12	54	Lost in promotion playoffs
5	Monza	34	13	15	6	42	32	+10	54	Lost in promotion playoffs
6	Cittadella	34	13	15	6	38	26	+12	54	
7	Padova	34	14	8	12	34	24	+10	50	
8	Lucchese	34	10	15	9	44	32	+12	45	
9	Pistoiese	34	10	13	11	33	29	+4	43	
10	Novara	34	10	11	13	32	37	−5	41	
11	Massese	34	9	14	11	32	39	−7	41	
12	Pro Patria	34	10	11	13	34	44	−10	41	
13	Cremonese	34	10	11	13	33	43	−10	41	
14	Pro Sesto	34	11	8	15	24	28	−4	41	Won relegation playoff
15	Sangiovannese	34	9	9	16	41	51	−10	36	Won relegation playoff
16	Pizzighettone (R)	34	7	12	15	24	41	−17	33	Lost relegation playoff
17	Ivrea (R)	34	7	10	17	25	43	−18	31	Lost relegation playoff
18	Pavia (R)	34	5	11	18	29	54	−25	26	Relegated to Serie C2

(C) Champions; (P) Promoted; (R) Relegated

=== Serie C1/B ===
Pos	Team	Pld	W	D	L	GF	GA	GD	Pts	Promotion or relegation
1	Ravenna (C, P)	34	21	6	7	50	30	+20	69	Promoted to Serie B
2	Avellino (P)	34	20	8	6	64	37	+27	66 (Note: 2 points deducted)	Won promotion playoffs
3	Cavese	34	17	11	6	46	30	+16	62	Lost in promotion playoffs
4	Foggia	34	16	11	7	41	25	+16	59	Lost in promotion playoffs
5	Taranto	34	15	11	8	45	31	+14	56	Lost in promotion playoffs
6	Perugia	34	15	9	10	40	29	+11	54	
7	Juve Stabia	34	13	14	7	34	27	+7	53	
8	Sambenedettese	34	14	7	13	45	45	0	49	
9	Manfredonia	34	12	10	12	41	43	−2	46	
10	Salernitana	34	11	11	12	38	41	−3	44	
11	Gallipoli	34	12	8	14	42	49	−7	44	
12	Lanciano	34	9	12	13	26	33	−7	39	
13	Ternana	34	9	12	13	30	36	−6	39	
14	Martina	34	9	10	15	27	40	−13	37	Won relegation playoff
15	Teramo (R)	34	9	10	15	27	39	−12	37	Lost relegation playoff
16	Ancona	34	9	6	19	37	49	−12	33	Won relegation playoff
17	San Marino (R)	34	8	8	18	37	43	−6	32	Lost relegation playoff
18	Giulianova (R)	34	2	6	26	18	60	−42	12	Relegated to Serie C2

(C) Champions; (P) Promoted; (R) Relegated

== Promotion and relegation playoffs ==
=== Serie C1/A ===
==== Promotion ====
Semi-finals
First legs played 27 May 2007; return legs played 3 June 2007

Team 1	Agg.	Team 2	1st leg	2nd leg
Monza (5)	4–3	(2) Sassuolo	0–1	4–2
Venezia (4)	2–4	(3) Pisa	1–1	1–3

Final
First leg played 10 June 2007; return leg played 17 June 2007

Team 1	Agg.	Team 2	1st leg	2nd leg
Monza (5)	1–2(aet)	(3) Pisa	1–0	0–2

Pisa promoted to Serie B

==== Relegation ====
Play-offs
First legs were played 27 May 2007; return were legs played 3 June 2007

Team 1	Agg.	Team 2	1st leg	2nd leg
Ivrea (17)	0–1	(14) Pro Sesto	0–0	0–1
Pizzighettone (16)	1–1	(15) Sangiovannese	1–1	0–0

Ivrea and Pizzighettone relegated to Serie C2

=== Serie C1/B ===
==== Promotion ====
Semi-finals
First legs played 27 May 2007; return legs played 3 June 2007

Team 1	Agg.	Team 2	1st leg	2nd leg
Taranto (5)	1–1	(2) Avellino	1–0	0–1
Foggia (4)	6–5	(3) Cavese	5–2	1–3

Final
First leg played 10 June 2007; return leg played 17 June 2007

Team 1	Agg.	Team 2	1st leg	2nd leg
Foggia (4)	1–3(aet)	(2) Avellino	1–0	0–3

Avellino promoted to Serie B

==== Relegation ====
Relegation play-offs
First legs were played 27 May 2007; return legs were played 3 June 2007

Team 1	Agg.	Team 2	1st leg	2nd leg
San Marino (17)	1–3	(14) Martina	0–2	1–1
Ancona (16)	4–2	(15) Teramo	2–0	2–2

San Marino and Teramo relegated to Serie C2
