= Manfredonia Calcio =

Italian football club

Manfredonia
- Full name: Manfredonia Calcio S.r.l.s.d.
- Nicknames: Donia; I Delfini (The Dolphins); Biancocelesti (The White and Sky Blues); I Sipontini (The Sipontans)
- Founded: 1932; 94 years ago
- Ground: Stadio Miramare
- Capacity: 4,076
- Chairman: Francesco Ciuffreda
- Manager: Francesco Cinque
- League: Serie D Group H
- 2022–23: Eccellenza Apulia, 1st of 14 (promoted)
Home colours	Away colours

Manfredonia Calcio S.r.l. Sportiva Dilettantistica commonly known as Manfredonia Calcio or just Manfredonia is an Italian association football club, based in Manfredonia, in the Province of Foggia, Apulia. Currently it plays in Serie D.

== History ==
=== Foundation ===
The club, founded in 1932 as Associazione Sportiva Manfredonia. Manfredonia is known for having been the first Italian professional team to play its home matches on a synthetic football field. The club also used Polisportiva Manfredonia as its denomination in 1940–41.

Manfredonia returned to play in the professional leagues only in 2004 (as S.S. Manfredonia Calcio S.r.l.), following 64 years of absence from Serie C. In 2004–05 Manfredonia won promotion from Serie C2 to Serie C1, but finished last in its division in 2007–08 and was directly relegated back down to Lega Pro Seconda Divisione (ex-Serie C2). The club also won the appeal to remain in the professional league in July 2008. The club initially failed the financial inspection by the Commissione di Vigilanza sulle Società di Calcio (Co.Vi.So.C.) of Italian Football Federation. At the end of the 2009–10 Lega Pro Seconda Divisione season, the company had major financial problems that led the team to failure. According to FIGC, the club had a capital shortfall of €918,661, in May 2010. The membership of the old company in FIGC was finally revoked in 2013.

=== Refoundation ===
Thanks to Article 52 of N.O.I.F., a phoenix club was founded in the summer of 2010 as A.S.D. Manfredonia Football 1932 and began the season in the Eccellenza Apulia. In the following year the club was renamed as A.S.D. Manfredonia Calcio.

In July 2016 the football club was incorporated again as a società a responsabilità limitata (means limited liability company): Manfredonia Calcio S.r.l. Sportiva Dilettantistica.

== Colors and badge ==
The team's colors are light blue and white.

== Rivalry ==
Manfredonia had a local rivalry with Foggia Calcio. They are both from the same province. In 2007 the match ended with multiple injuries among the journalists.

== Notable players ==
former players with international caps

- (Ghana) Ahmed Barusso
- (Philippines) Simone Rota
- (Italy) Marco Sau

former players who played in Serie A

- (Brazil) Eugênio Rômulo Togni
- (Italy) Marco Sansovini
