= Carpenedolo =

Carpenedolo Carpenédol
- Comune
- Comune di Carpenedolo
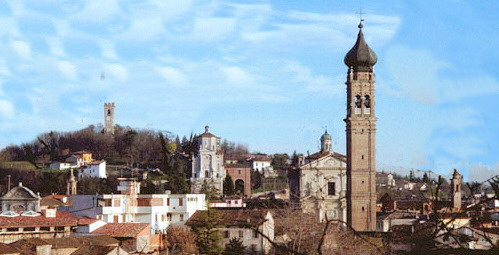

- Coat of arms

- Location within Italy Location within Lombardy
- Coordinates: 45°22′N 10°26′E
- Country: Italy
- Region: Lombardy
- Province: Brescia (BS)
- Frazioni: Cornali, Gerole, Lame, Lametta, Livelli, Ravere, Sant'Apollonia, Taglie, Tezze, Uve Bianche

Government
  - Mayor: Stefano Tramonti

Area
  - Total: 29.84 km^{2} (11.52 sq mi)
- Elevation: 78 m (256 ft)

Population (30 November 2017)
  - Total: 12,946
  - Density: 433.8/km^{2} (1,124/sq mi)
- Demonym: Carpenedolesi
- Time zone: UTC+1 (CET)
  - Summer (DST): UTC+2 (CEST)
- Postal code: 25013
- Dialing code: 030
- Patron saint: St. Bartholomew the Apostle
- Saint day: 24 August
- Website: Official website

Carpenedolo (Brescian: Carpenédol) is a town and comune in the province of Brescia, in Lombardy, northern Italy.
