= Filippo Spitoni =

Italian footballer

Personal information
- Date of birth: 17 April 1984 (age 42)
- Place of birth: Fabriano, Italy
- Height: 1.86 m (6 ft 1 in)
- Position: Goalkeeper

Team information
- Current team: Fabriano
- Number: 1

Senior career*
Years	Team	Apps	(Gls)
2001–2002	Vis Pesaro	0	(0)
2002–2008	Bellaria Igea Marina	132	(0)
2004–2005	→ Vis Pesaro (loan)	3	(0)
2008–2009	Andria BAT	26	(0)
2009–2010	Bologna	0	(0)
2010–	Pavia	4	(0)
- * Club domestic league appearances and goals as of 16:06, 19 April 2010 (UTC)

Filippo Spitoni (born 17 April 1984 in Fabriano) is an Italian professional footballer who currently plays as a goalkeeper for Fabriano.
