= Marco Zaninelli =

Italian footballer

Personal information
- Date of birth: 25 April 1977 (age 49)
- Place of birth: Tione di Trento, Italy
- Height: 1.82 m (5 ft 11 1/2 in)
- Position: Defender

Senior career*
Years	Team	Apps	(Gls)
1992–1996	Settaurense	97	(12)
1996–2004	Lumezzane	116	(5)
2001	→ Pro Vercelli (loan)	11	(1)
2004–2009	Treviso	42	(1)
2005–2007	→ Cesena (co-ownership)	58	(2)
2007–2008	→ Spezia (loan)	16	(1)
2009–2010	Pergocrema	11	(0)
2010–2012	Mantova	53	(4)
- * Club domestic league appearances and goals

Marco Zaninelli (born 25 April 1977) is an Italian former footballer.

Zaninelli had spent most of his career in Italian lower divisions, especially in Lega Pro. Zaninelli also played in Serie B from 2004 until 2009.

== Biography ==
=== Settaurense ===
Born in Tione di Trento, Trentino, Zaninelli started his career at Settaurense. He followed the team from Promozione (Italian 7th level) to Eccellenza Trentino – South Tyrol in 1993 and Serie D in 1995. The small team from Storo finished in the mid-table in 1995–96 Serie D.

=== Lumezzane ===
After the season Zaninelli was signed by Lombardy team Lumezzane. He spent 7 1/2 seasons with the Serie C team, winning 1996–97 Serie C2. After Lumezzane merely promoted to Serie B in 2004 (losing to Cesena in the playoffs), Zaninelli was signed by Serie B club Treviso along with Luis Centi on 31 August 2004.

=== Treviso ===
Zaninelli played 29 games for Treviso in 2004–05 Serie B. The club missed the promotion after losing to Perugia in the playoffs semifinals. However Treviso later re-admitted to 2005–06 Serie A, after Caso Genoa and the bankrupt of Torino Calcio and Perugia. In August 2005, Zaninelli returned to Serie B as the club sold him to Cesena in co-ownership deal, for a peppercorn of €500. He spent 2 seasons with the Emilia–Romagna club. In 2006–07 Serie B, Zaninelli made 22 starts. On 20 June 2007 Treviso bought back Zaninelli for a peppercorn again. In July 2007 Zaninelli left for Serie B struggler Spezia along with Giovanni Fietta and Davide Saverino. Treviso had purchased Leonardo Bonucci as centre-back from Internazionale. Zaninelli only able to play 15 starts with the Ligurian club. The club finished as the bottom. It was followed by the relegation and bankruptcy. Zaninelli returned to Veneto in 2008. Along with Bonucci (who left in January), Zaninelli was one of the defender of the Serie B struggler. Zaninelli made 9 starts and the club also relegated, and again folded.

=== Pergocrema ===
After 5 months without a club, Zaninelli was signed by Pergocrema That season Pergo was in Lega Pro Prima Divisione. However Zaninelli only added 11 games to his experienced third division career, 2 games less than in 2008–09 Serie B.

=== Mantova ===
Zaninelli was able to find another club in Lombardy. He joined newly re-found Mantova F.C., which is the heir of bankrupted AC Mantova which relegated from 2009–10 Serie B. Originally Mantova relegated to 2010–11 Lega Pro Prima Divisione, but after the bankruptcy, the heir was allowed to play in 2010–11 Serie D. Zaninelli was the starting defender of the team, winning Group B. However Mantova finished as the bottom of Group 1 in the playoffs for Scudetto Dilettanti (the [overall] champion of amateur [league]) After promoted back to professional league, Zaninelli remained as the starting centre-back of the team while Emanuele Fonte was his new partner.

== Honours ==
- Serie C2: 1997 (Lumezzane)
- Serie D: 2011 (Mantova)
- Eccellenza Trentino – South Tyrol: 1995 (Settaurense)
- Promozione Trentino – South Tyrol: 1993 (Settaurense)
