= Fabrizio Anselmi =

Italian footballer

Personal information
- Date of birth: 11 May 1978 (age 48)
- Place of birth: Rome, Italy
- Height: 1.88 m (6 ft 2 in)
- Position: Centre-back

Senior career*
Years	Team	Apps	(Gls)
1997–2002	Lodigiani	107	(3)
2002–2003	Sassari Torres	14	(1)
2003–2004	Grosseto	27	(5)
2004–2009	Sassuolo	120	(4)
2009–2010	Verona	16	(1)
2010–2011	Barletta	13	(0)
2011	→ Pisa (loan)	11	(0)
Total		308	(14)

Managerial career
- 2018–2019: ASD Tor Sapienza
- 2021–: ASD Tor Sapienza
- * Club domestic league appearances and goals

Fabrizio Anselmi (born 11 May 1978) is an Italian football manager and a former player who played as a defender. He is the manager of ASD Tor Sapienza. He spent most of his career in Italian Lega Pro.

== Career ==
Born in Rome, Lazio, Anselmi is a youth product of Lodigiani. In 2002, he left for Sassari Torres and then Grosseto. He settled in Sassuolo, which he followed the team promoted twice from Serie C2 to Serie B in 2008. Anselmi was the defender in 2006 and 2007 promotion playoffs (only missed once in 2006 and replaced by Girelli), but did not play in 2008 Supercoppa di Lega di Prima Divisione. After promoted to Serie B, he was one of the team's starting centre-backs along with Marco Andreolli.

In 2009, he left for Verona on a 2-year contract. On 31 August 2010 he left for Barletta in 2-year contract.

On 31 January 2011 he was traded to Pisa for Federico Cerone.

In August 2011 he was released by Barletta.

== Honours ==
Sassuolo

- Supercoppa di Lega di Prima Divisione: 2008
- Lega Pro Prima Divisione: 2008
