= Stadio Virgilio Fedini =

Coordinates: 43°34′26″N 11°31′36″E

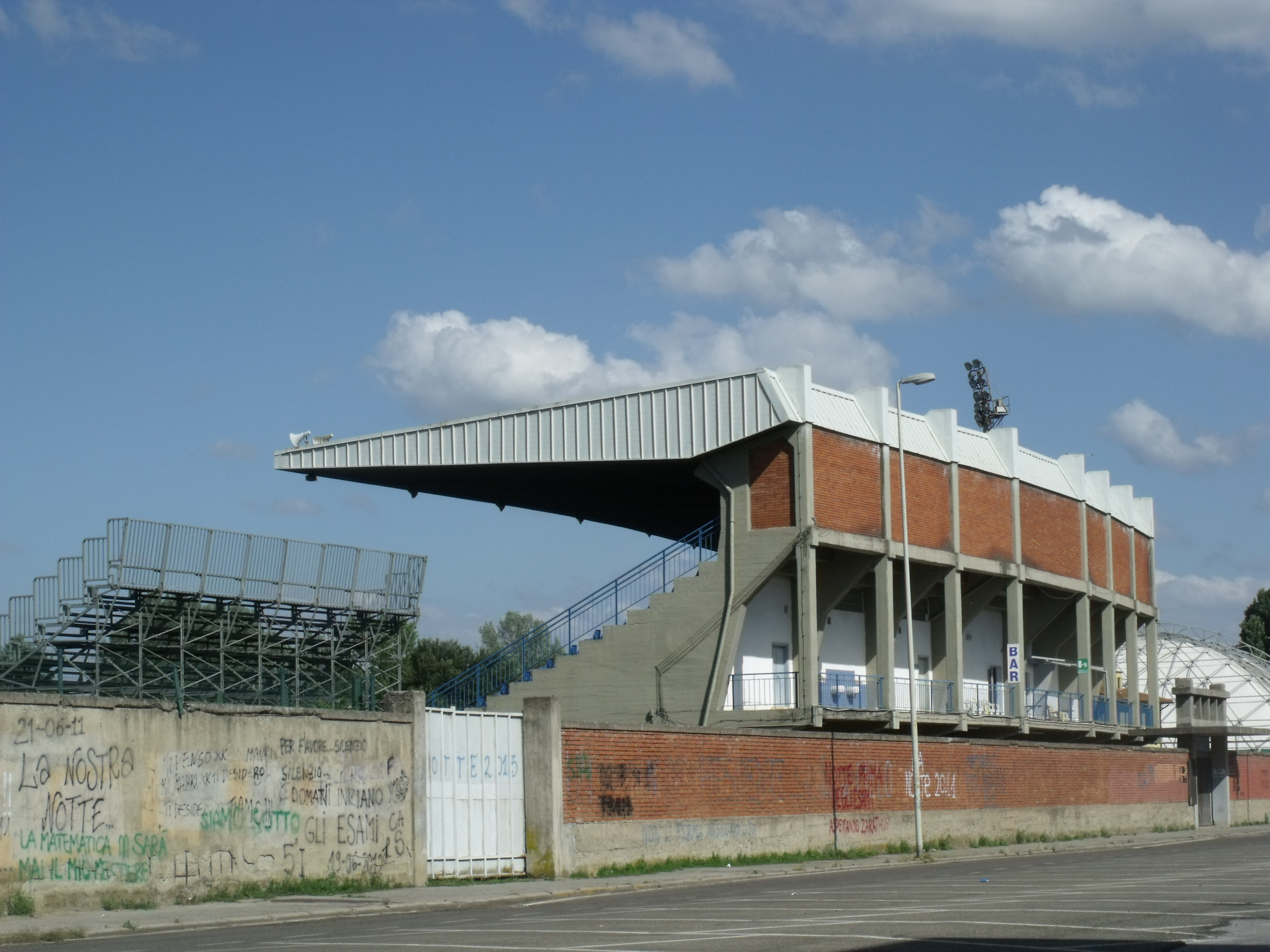
- Interactive map of Stadio Virgilio Fedini
- Location: San Giovanni Valdarno, Italy
- Owner: Municipality of San Giovanni Valdarno
- Capacity: 3,378
- Surface: Grass

Construction
- Opened: 1996

Tenant
- A.C. Sangiovannese 1927

Stadio Virgilio Fedini is a multi-use stadium in San Giovanni Valdarno, Italy. It is currently used mostly for football matches and is the home ground of A.C. Sangiovannese 1927. The stadium holds 3,378.
