= ASD Calcio Ivrea =

Italian football club

Ivrea
- Full name: Unione Sportiva Ivrea Calcio
- Founded: 1918; 108 years ago as, Unione Sportiva Eporediese; 1930; 96 years ago as, Ivrea Sport (refounded); 1932; 94 years ago as, Associazione Calcio Ivrea; 1959; 67 years ago as, Unione Sportiva Ivrea Calcio; 2010; 16 years ago as, A.S.D. Montalto Ivrea (relocated); 2012; 14 years ago as, A.S.D. Calcio Ivrea; 2015; 11 years ago as, Football Club Calcio Ivrea 1905 A.S.D. 2019; 7 years ago as, Unione Sportiva Ivrea Calcio (merged)
- Ground: Stadio Gino Pistoni, Ivrea, Italy
- Capacity: 3,500
- Chairman: Dario Ravera Chion
- Manager: Roberto Cretaz
- League: Promozione Piedmont-Aosta Valley
- 2008–09: Lega Pro Seconda Divisione/A, 9th (relegated after being declared bankrupt)
Home colours	Away colours

Unione Sportiva Ivrea Calcio commonly referred to as Ivrea, is an Italian association football club, based in Ivrea, Piedmont. It currently plays in Promozione Piedmont-Aosta Valley.

== History ==
=== U.S. Ivrea Calcio ===
Unione Sportiva Ivrea was founded in 1901, with its Football Division founded in 1918.

==== Seasons from 2005–06 to 2008–09 ====
U.S. Ivrea Calcio played 2005–2006 in Serie C2/A, and won the promotion play-offs beating A.C. Carpenedolo in the finals, being therefore promoted to Serie C1, but promptly relegated after having lost the relegation play-out the next season.

In the summer of 2009, the club failed to register in Lega Pro Seconda Divisione and disbanded.

=== From A.S.D. Montalto Ivrea to A.S.D. Calcio Ivrea ===
==== A.S.D. Montalto Ivrea ====
In the summer 2010 U.S.D. Montaltese, after the 9th place in 2009–10 Promozione Piedmont and Aosta Valley group B, transferred its seat from Montalto Dora to Ivrea and was renamed A.S.D. Montalto Ivrea, after the dissolution of the historical U.S. Ivrea Calcio the previous year.

In the 2010–11 season, it played always in Promozione Piedmont and Aosta Valley group B ranking 2nd in the league and 3rd in the subsequent playoffs.

In the season 2011–12 it was promoted to Eccellenza after winning the group B of Promozione Piedmont and Aosta Valley group B, also conquering the regional Scudetto of Promozione.

In the summer 2012 the club that plays in Eccellenza Piedmont and Aosta Valley group A was renamed A.S.D. Calcio Ivrea, thus becoming the new Ivrea.

This fake club moved to another town in 2015.

== Colors and badge ==
The team's color is orange.
