= Tiziano Polenghi =

Italian footballer

Personal information
- Date of birth: 26 September 1978 (age 48)
- Place of birth: Vizzolo Predabissi, Italy
- Height: 1.82 m (6 ft 0 in)
- Position: Defender

Youth career
- Inter Milan

Senior career*
Years	Team	Apps	(Gls)
1998–1999	Castel di Sangro	9	(0)
1999–2005	Novara	138	(8)
2004–2005	Salernitana	18	(2)
2005–2009	Lecce	88	(5)
2009–2011	Sassuolo	36	(2)
2011–2012	Cremonese	23	(0)
2012–2014	Monza	54	(1)
2014–2015	Santarcangelo	4	(0)
2015–2016	Giana Erminio	39	(0)
Total		409	(18)
- * Club domestic league appearances and goals

Tiziano Polenghi (born 26 September 1978) is an Italian former professional footballer who played as a defender, making 93 appearances for Lecce across Serie A, Serie B, and the Coppa Italia.
