= Stadio Miramare =

Multi-use stadium in Manfredonia, Italy

Coordinates: 41°37′41″N 15°55′8″E

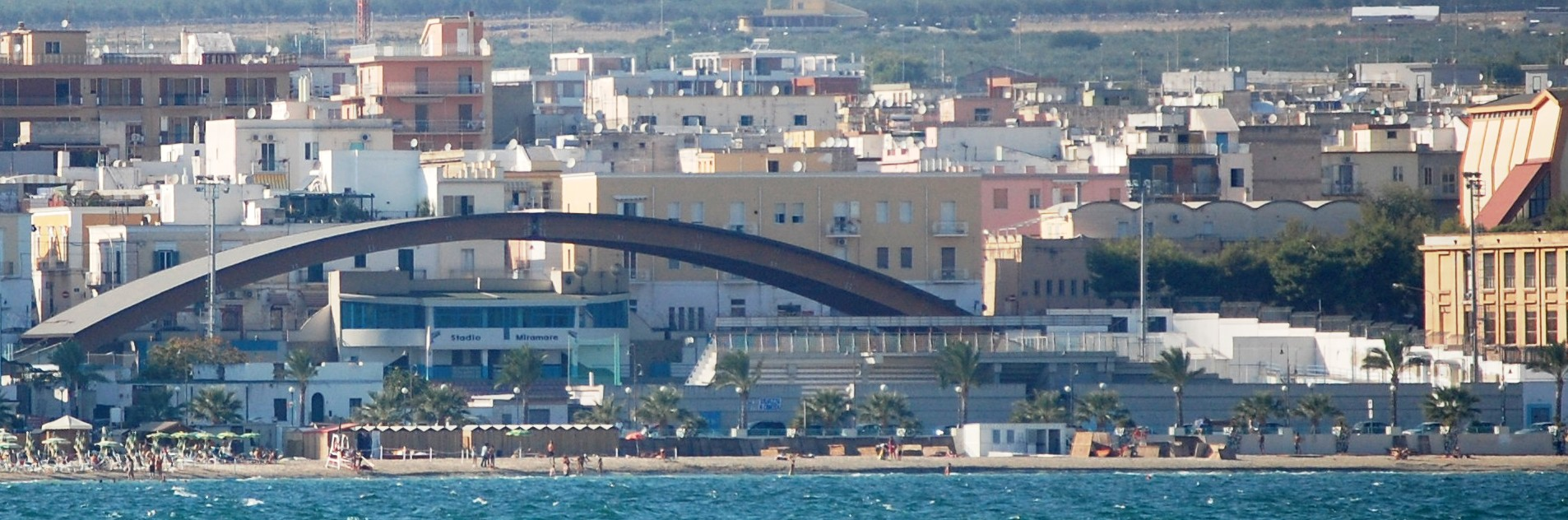
- Stadio Miramare (Manfredonia)
- Interactive map of Stadio Miramare
- Location: Manfredonia, Italy
- Owner: Municipality of Manfredonia
- Capacity: 4,076
- Surface: Grass

Construction
- Opened: 1932

Tenant
- Manfredonia Calcio

Stadio Miramare is a multi-use stadium in Manfredonia, Italy. It is currently used mostly for football matches and is the home ground of Manfredonia Calcio. The stadium holds 4,076 spectators.
