= Emanuele Terranova =

Italian footballer (born 1987)

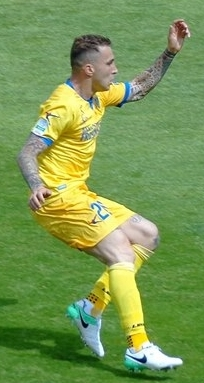

Personal information
- Date of birth: 14 April 1987 (age 39)
- Place of birth: Mazara del Vallo, Italy
- Height: 1.80 m (5 ft 11 in)
- Position: Centre back

Team information
- Current team: Sassuolo (youth coach)

Youth career
- Aurora Mazara
- Atletico Mazara
- 2005–2007: Palermo

Senior career*
Years	Team	Apps	(Gls)
2004–2005	Campobello di Mazara	30	(?)
2005–2011	Palermo	0	(0)
2007–2008	→ Vicenza (loan)	19	(2)
2008–2009	→ Livorno (loan)	21	(0)
2009–2010	→ Lecce (loan)	27	(0)
2010–2011	→ Frosinone (loan)	35	(3)
2011–2017	Sassuolo	91	(14)
2017–2018	Frosinone	52	(4)
2018–2022	Cremonese	73	(3)
2021–2022	→ Bari (loan)	34	(4)
2022–2023	Bari	10	(0)
2023	Reggina	10	(0)
2023–2024	Benevento	15	(0)
2024–2025	Lumezzane	0	(0)
- * Club domestic league appearances and goals as of 25 April 2025

Emanuele Terranova (born 14 April 1987) is an Italian football coach and retired defender, currently working with Sassuolo as a youth coach.

== Playing career ==
Terranova started his career playing with several local amateur teams, including Eccellenza side Campobello, then joined the Palermo youth system in 2005 and played with the Primavera under-20 squad with the rosanero.

He successively spent the entire 2007–08 season on loan to Vicenza of Serie B, being also often featured as a regular. He played the 2008–09 season again out on loan, this time to Livorno, being part of the Tuscans' successful campaign that led them back to Serie A after only one season. Livorno decided not to make an offer for a permanent deal, so Terranova returned to Palermo, and joined Walter Zenga's first team squad.

On 19 August 2009, Terranova was loaned out to Serie B outfit Lecce, with an option for the giallorossi from Apulia to buy half of the player's transfer rights at the end of the season, which the club did not use. In July 2010, Terranova went out on loan again, this time to Frosinone.

On 1 July 2011, Serie B club Sassuolo announced that they had completed the permanent signing of Terranova from Palermo.

On 17 August 2018, Terranova signed with Cremonese. On 30 August 2021, he was loaned to Bari, with an obligation to buy in case of Bari's promotion to Serie B.

On 31 January 2023, Terranova moved to Reggina on a year-and-a-half-long contract.

On 8 September 2023, Terranova signed a one-season contract with Benevento.

On 30 July 2024, Terranova joined Lumezzane for one season.

== Coaching career ==
On 15 December 2025, Terranova agreed to return to Sassuolo as a technical collaborator for the club's youth system.

== Career statistics ==
As of match played 24 April 2022

Appearances and goals by club, season and competition
Club	Season	League			National Cup		Other		Total	
Club	Season	Division	Apps	Goals	Apps	Goals	Apps	Goals	Apps	Goals
Palermo	2006–07	Serie A	0	0	0	0	—		0	0
Vicenza (loan)	2007–08	Serie B	20	2	0	0	—		20	2
Livorno (loan)	2008–09	Serie B	19	0	1	0	2 (Note: Appearance(s) in Promotion Playoffs)	0	22	0
Lecce (loan)	2009–10	Serie B	27	0	0	0	—		27	0
Frosinone (loan)	2010–11	Serie B	35	3	1	0	—		36	3
Sassuolo	2011–12	Serie B	32	3	2	0	2	0	36	3
Sassuolo	2012–13	Serie B	37	11	2	0	—		39	11
Sassuolo	2013–14	Serie A	4	0	1	0	—		5	0
Sassuolo	2014–15	Serie A	9	0	1	0	—		10	0
Sassuolo	2015–16	Serie A	6	0	0	0	—		6	0
Sassuolo	2016–17	Serie A	3	0	0	0	—		3	0
Sassuolo	Total		91	14	6	0	2	0	99	14
Frosinone	2016–17	Serie B	16	1	0	0	2	0	18	1
Frosinone	2017–18	Serie B	36	3	1	0	4	0	41	3
Frosinone	2018–19	Serie B	0	0	1	0	—		1	0
Frosinone	Total		52	4	2	0	6	0	60	4
Cremonese	2018–19	Serie B	31	2	0	0	—		31	2
Cremonese	2019–20	Serie B	19	0	1	0	—		20	0
Cremonese	2020–21	Serie B	23	1	1	0	—		24	1
Cremonese	Total		73	3	2	0	0	0	75	3
Bari (loan)	2021–22	Serie C	33	4	—		—		33	4
Career total			350	30	12	0	10	0	372	30

== Honours ==
Lecce

- Serie B: 2009–10

Sassuolo

- Serie B: 2012–13

Bari

- Serie C: 2021–22 (Group C)
