= Jonathan Rossini =

Swiss footballer (born 1989)

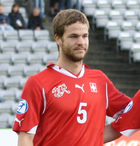
- Rossini with the Switzerland U21

Personal information
- Date of birth: 5 April 1989 (age 37)
- Place of birth: Giubiasco, Switzerland
- Height: 1.85 m (6 ft 1 in)
- Position: Centre-back

Youth career
- 2000–2005: Bellinzona
- 2005–2008: Sampdoria

Senior career*
Years	Team	Apps	(Gls)
2008–2009	Sampdoria	0	(0)
2008–2009	→ Legnano (loan)	17	(0)
2009	→ Cittadella (loan)	11	(0)
2009–2013	Udinese	0	(0)
2009–2010	→ Sassuolo (loan)	31	(2)
2010–2011	→ Sampdoria (loan)	0	(0)
2011	→ Sassuolo (loan)	18	(0)
2011–2013	→ Sampdoria (loan)	51	(0)
2013–2018	Sassuolo	6	(0)
2014	→ Parma (loan)	3	(0)
2014–2015	→ Bari (loan)	8	(0)
2015–2016	→ Savona (loan)	10	(0)
2016–2017	→ Livorno (loan)	16	(1)
2017–2018	→ Pistoiese (loan)	9	(0)
2018	→ Pontedera (loan)	12	(0)
2018–2019	Albissola	27	(0)
2019	Savona	6	(0)
2019–2021	Lavagnese	33	(2)
Total		258	(5)

International career
2005–2006	Switzerland U17	11	(0)
2007–2008	Switzerland U19	8	(0)
2008–2011	Switzerland U21	23	(1)
2010	Switzerland	1	(0)
- * Club domestic league appearances and goals

Jonathan "Johnny" Rossini (born 5 April 1989) is a Swiss former professional footballer who played as a centre back. He is also a former Switzerland international.

== Club career ==
=== Youth career ===
Rossini began his playing career at AC Bellinzona, near his birthplace.

=== Sampdoria ===
In summer 2005, aged 16, the minimum age for an international transfer within the European Economic Area (Switzerland signed a special agreement with EU), Rossini moved to Italian side Sampdoria. He moved on loan to Italy Lega Pro Prima Divisione team Legnano. In January 2009, he was transferred on loan to Cittadella in Serie B.

=== Between Sampdoria and Udinese ===
In summer 2009, Rossini was acquired by Udinese in a co-ownership deal from Sampdoria for €500,000 as part of Fernando Tissone's deal (€3 million) and subsequently loaned to Sassuolo for the 2009–10 season, alongside Sampdoria teammate Gianluigi Bianco.

In June 2010, along with Tissone, Rossini's co-ownership deal with Udinese was extended and he was loaned back to Sampdoria, however he did not make an immediate first-team appearance for them.

On 3 January 2011, Rossini was again loaned to Sassuolo for the remainder of the 2010–11 season, where he appeared in 18 league matches Serie B.

Rossini returned to Sampdoria for the 2011–12 season under manager Giuseppe Iachini. He made his Sampdoria debut on 19 November 2011 against Reggina, where he helped earn Sampdoria promotion to Serie A after they won the Serie B play-offs.

After promotion to Serie A, under new manager Ciro Ferrara, Rossini was first-choice centre-back alongside captain Daniele Gastaldello at the heart of the defence. Rossini's first Serie A match was against Milan on 26 August 2012. After the arrival of new manager Delio Rossi, Rossini lost his place in the team after Angelo Palombo returned from Internazionale and was played regularly at centre-back, at Rossini's expense. In total, Rossini made 25 Serie A appearances in the 2012–13 season.

On 20 June – 1 July 2013, Sassuolo, newly promoted to Serie A, purchased the 50% ownership rights to Rossini held by Udinese for €1.5 million, via Sampdoria. Sampdoria retained the remaining 50% of Rossini's rights.

=== Sassuolo ===
On 1 July 2013, Rossini joined Sassuolo on another co-ownership deal and appeared in six league matches for the first part of the 2013–14 season. However, Sassuolo later signed centre-backs Lorenzo Ariaudo and Paolo Cannavaro during the 2014 January transfer window, limiting Rossini's first-team appearances.

==== Parma (loan) ====
On 21 January 2014, Rossini was loaned out the fellow Serie A club Parma for the remainder of the season, with Aleandro Rosi moving in the opposite direction to Sassuolo, also on loan. Rossini mainly found himself used as the backup at centre-back to Italian international Gabriel Paletta and club captain Alessandro Lucarelli. Parma finished the season in sixth position and qualified for Europe. However, because Parma was ineligible to qualify for European competitions, Torino was given their place in the UEFA Europa League.

On 20 June 2014, Sampdoria relinquished the Rossini's remaining 50% rights to Sassuolo for free.

==== Bari (loan) ====
On 11 July 2014, after Rossini began training with English Championship club Leeds United, Leeds owner Massimo Cellino revealed the club was looking to sign Rossini on a year-long loan with the option to make the move permanent. However, on 13 July, Leeds opted to abandon the deal due to concerns of Rossini's lack of fitness, and the player returned to Sassuolo. Cellino said, "We want special players at Leeds United. Rossini didn't show enough during the three days he trained with the rest of the team. After speaking to him, it is clear that he didn't have the right attitude to join Leeds, so we have allowed him to leave."

On 17 July 2014, Rossini joined Serie B club Bari on loan from Sassuolo.

==== Savona (loan) ====
On 17 July 2015, Rossini was signed by Lega Pro club Savona on a temporary deal from Sassuolo.

==== Livorno (loan) ====
On 27 August 2016, Rossini was signed by Lega Pro club Livorno in another loan deal from Sassuolo.

==== Pistoiese & Pontedera (loan) ====
On 19 July 2017 Rossini joined Pistoiese on another loan deal. On 30 January 2018 Rossini moved to Pontedera on another loan.

==== Serie D ====
For the 2019–20 season, he returned to Savona, now in the Serie D. He left the club on 12 December 2019 to join fellow league club U.S.D. Lavagnese 1919.

== International career ==
Rossini debuted for the Switzerland under-21 national team on 19 November 2008 against Greece U21. The match ended in a 1–1 draw. He made his competitive U21 debut in a winning match against Armenia on 5 June 2009, the opening match of 2011 UEFA European Under-21 Championship qualification. He scored a goal in the return leg.

On 3 March 2010, Rossini made his senior Switzerland debut – as a starter – in a friendly match against Uruguay. He was replaced by Steve von Bergen at half-time. The match finished 3–1 to Uruguay, with Uruguay goals from Luis Suárez, Diego Forlán and Edinson Cavani, and Switzerland's goal from Gökhan Inler.

== Honours ==
Sampdoria

- Serie B play-offs: 2011–12 (Promoted)

Individual

- Voted in 2011 UEFA European Under-21 Championship Team of the Tournament
