= Nicola Donazzan =

Italian footballer

Personal information
- Date of birth: 8 January 1985 (age 41)
- Place of birth: Bassano del Grappa, Italy
- Height: 1.78 m (5 ft 10 in)
- Position: Defender

Team information
- Current team: Cittadella (assistant)

Youth career
- –2004: Inter Milan

Senior career*
Years	Team	Apps	(Gls)
2004–2007	Mantova	17	(0)
2007–2012	Sassuolo	88	(1)
2012–2013	Eurocalcio		
2013	Ceahlăul Piatra Neamț	0	(0)
2013–2014	Mantova	16	(0)
2014–2016	Cittadella	13	(0)
2016–2017	Eurocalcio		
Total		134	(0)

Managerial career
- 2019–2021: Cittadella U17
- 2021–: Cittadella (assistant)
- * Club domestic league appearances and goals

Nicola Donazzan (born 8 January 1985) is an Italian former player who played as a defender.

== Club career ==
Donazzan started his career with Internazionale, being later sold to Mantova in a co-ownership bid for a peppercorn fee of €500. He made a total 17 appearances during his three-year-long stay with the virgiliani. In July 2007, after Mantova made his transfer permanent for free, he was loaned out to Sassuolo, where he was protagonist of the neroverdi's successful Serie C1/A campaign. That season Donazzan was a utility player, who played in centre-back and left-back positions. However, he did not play in Supercoppa di Lega di Prima Divisione. Later in June 2008 Sassuolo decided to make his move became a co-ownership deal.

Donazzan signed a new 1-year deal on 22 June 2011.

== Honours ==
Sassuolo

- Serie C1: 2007–08
- Supercoppa di Serie C: 2008

Cittadella

- Lega Pro: 2015–16
