= Gianluigi Bianco =

Italian footballer

Personal information
- Date of birth: 11 May 1989 (age 37)
- Place of birth: Genoa, Italy
- Height: 1.84 m (6 ft 0 in)
- Position: Left back

Youth career
- Sampdoria

Senior career*
Years	Team	Apps	(Gls)
2008–2012	Sampdoria	0	(0)
2008–2009	→ Empoli (loan)	9	(0)
2009–2010	→ Sassuolo (loan)	42	(1)
2011	→ Frosinone (loan)	11	(1)
2011–2012	→ Grosseto (loan)	7	(0)
2012	→ Vicenza (loan)	11	(0)
2012–2013	Avellino	15	(0)
2013–2014	Castel Rigone	18	(2)
2014–2015	Casertana	27	(5)
2015–2016	Benevento	1	(0)
2016	→ Cremonese (loan)	6	(0)
2017	Pro Piacenza	14	(0)

International career
2009	Italy U20	1	(0)
- * Club domestic league appearances and goals as of 6 May 2017

Gianluigi Bianco (born 11 May 1989) is an Italian footballer who plays as a defender.

== Club career ==
Born in Genoa, Liguria, Bianco started his career at hometown club Sampdoria. On 13 August 2008, he left for Serie B side Empoli in co-ownership deal for €900,000 in a four-year deal.

In June 2009, he was bought back by Sampdoria for €500,000 in a four-year deal. In July 2009, he was loaned to Serie B side Sassuolo along with Jonathan Rossini. After playing five games for Sampdoria in the 2010 pre-season, he rejoined Sassuolo on loan. In January 2011 he left for Serie B bottom club Frosinone.

On 31 August 2012 Bianco left for Avellino for free.

On 10 July 2014 he was signed by Casertana.

== International career ==
Bianco was capped for the Italy U17 team on 1 June 2007, against Juniores Best XI, in an unofficial friendly.

He was also called up to the Italy U19 team, for 2008 UEFA European Under-19 Football Championship elite qualification, but did not play.

Bianco was capped once for Italy U20 team at 2008–09 Four Nations Tournament. He also played once for Italy under-21 Serie B representative team, in an internal training match. In February 2010, he received his first U21 call-up, for the 2011 U21 Euro qualifying match against Hungary U21 on 3 March. Bianco appeared as unused bench on that match.
