= Antonio Bocchetti =

Italian retired footballer (born 1980)

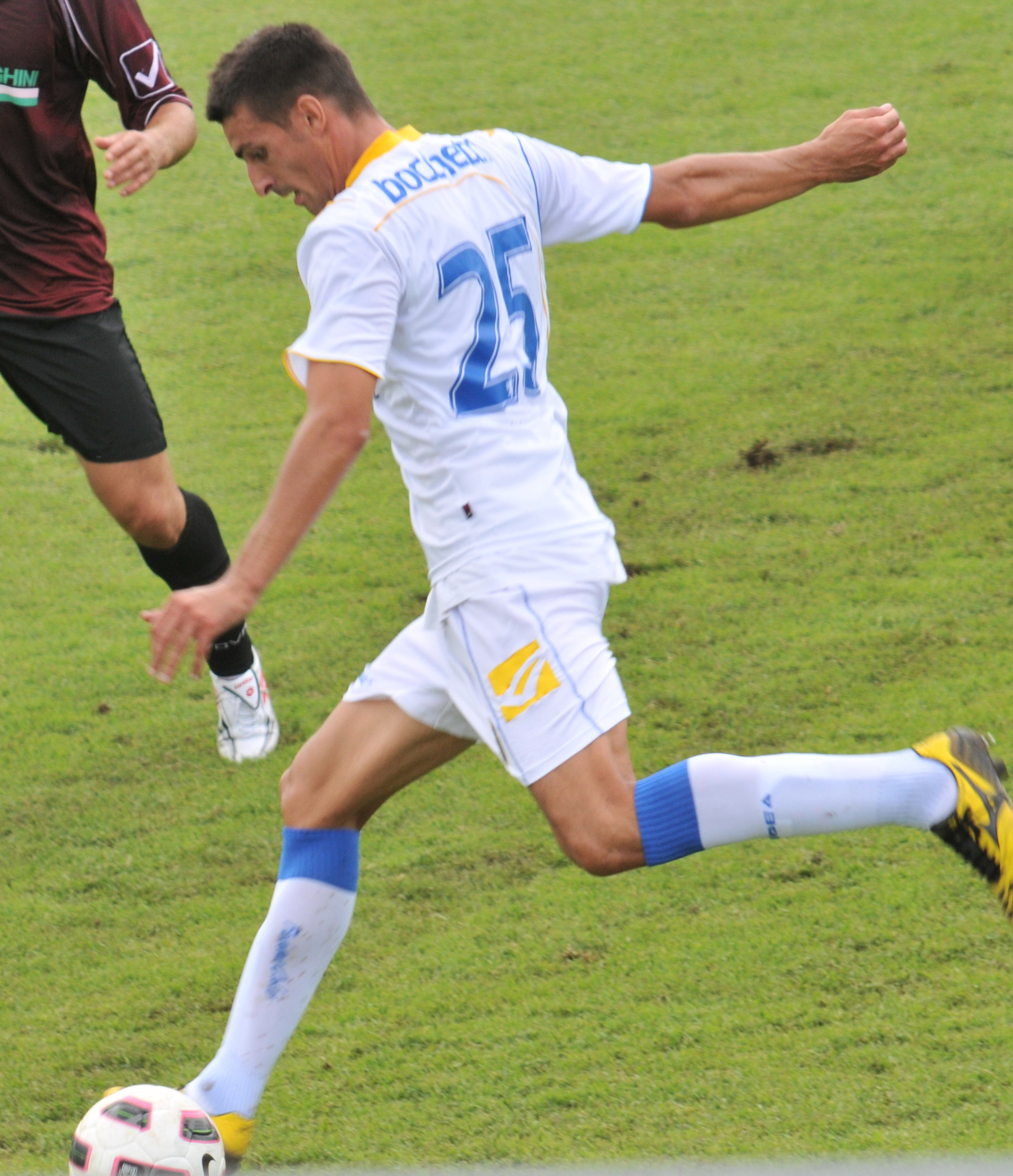

Personal information
- Full name: Antonio Bocchetti
- Date of birth: 11 June 1980 (age 46)
- Place of birth: Naples, Italy
- Height: 1.83 m (6 ft 0 in)
- Position: Defender

Team information
- Current team: Paganese (sporting director)

Youth career
- 1998–1999: Napoli

Senior career*
Years	Team	Apps	(Gls)
1999–2003	Napoli	69	(2)
1999–2000	→ Crotone (loan)	6	(0)
2003–2006	Piacenza	79	(3)
2006–2007	Parma	18	(0)
2007–2011	Frosinone	134	(1)
2011	→ Sassuolo (loan)	11	(0)
2011–2014	Pescara	14	(0)
2014–2016	Paganese	43	(1)
2015	→ Salernitana (loan)	15	(0)

International career
2000	Italy U-20	3	(0)
2001–2002	Italy U-21	2	(0)
- * Club domestic league appearances and goals

Antonio Bocchetti (born 11 June 1980) is an Italian retired footballer who played as a defender.

== Club career ==
Bocchetti started his career at Napoli. He played his first Serie A match on 3 December 2000. In July 2003, he was sold to Piacenza, then in Serie B in a co-ownership deal; Vittorio Tosto moved to Naples in exchange.

He signed with Parma of Serie A in a co-ownership deal in mid-2006, for €400,000. In June 2007 Parma bought Bocchetti outright for another €220,000. In mid-2007, he was sold to Frosinone of Serie B in another co-ownership deal for €450,000. In June 2008 Frosinone acquired Bocchetti outright for another €250,000.

== International career ==
Bocchetti was capped for the Italy U-20 team at the 2000 Toulon Tournament.

== After retiring ==
From 2016 until December 2017, Bocchetti worked as a coordinator for Paganese. On 8 December 2017, he was appointed as sporting director for the club. He worked for the club until the end of the 2017/18, where he joined Fano, also as a sporting director. On 11 March 2019, Bocchetti decided to resign.
