= ASD Sangiovannese 1927 =

Italian football club

Sangiovannese
- Full name: Associazione Sportiva Dilettantistica Sangiovannese 1927
- Nickname: Sangio
- Founded: 1927; 2011 (refounded)
- Ground: Stadio Virgilio Fedini, San Giovanni Valdarno, Italy
- Capacity: 3,378
- Chairman: Giovanni Serafini
- Manager: Agostino Iacobelli
- League: Eccellenza Tuscany
- 2024–25: Serie D/E, 17th (relegated)
Home colours	Away colours

Associazione Sportiva Dilettantistica Sangiovannese 1927 (formerly Associazione Calcio Sangiovannese 1927) is an Italian association football club based in San Giovanni Valdarno, Tuscany. They currently play in Eccellenza Tuscany.

== History ==
=== Sangiovannese 1927 ===
Old Sangiovannese logo

The club was founded in 1927 as A.C. Sangiovannese 1927.

Sangiovannese played in Serie C2 from 2000–01, following their promotion from Serie D, then reaching Serie C1 in 2003–04. The club played in this league until 2007–08 when they were relegated to Lega Pro Seconda Divisione. Sangio would remain in this division for three seasons until 2010–11.

They did not compete in the league during the 2011–12 Lega Pro Seconda Divisione season.

=== SanGiovanniValdarno ===
The club was refounded in 2011 as A.S.D. SanGiovanniValdarno.

In the 2013–14 season, they were promoted to Serie D after winning the play-out.

== Colours and badge ==
The team's colours are blue and white.

== Honours ==
- Serie D:
  - Winners 1: 1999–2000
- Scudetto Dilettanti:
  - Winners 1: 1999–2000
