= Edevaldo Grimaldi =

Italian footballer (born 1984)

Personal information
- Date of birth: 6 June 1984 (age 42)
- Place of birth: Ecoporanga, Espírito Santo, Brazil
- Height: 1.75 m (5 ft 9 in)
- Position: Right-back

Youth career
- Perugia

Senior career*
Years	Team	Apps	(Gls)
2003–2004	→ Rimini (loan)	0	(0)
2004–2009	Sassuolo	88	(0)
2008–2009	→ Lecco (loan)	18	(0)
2009–2010	Paganese	22	(0)
2012	Real Rimini	0	(0)

International career
2001	Italy U16	0	(0)
2001–2002	Italy U18	1	(0)

Managerial career
- 2021: Afragolese (assistant)
- * Club domestic league appearances and goals

Edevaldo Grimaldi (born 6 June 1984) is an Italian-Brazilian former professional footballer who played as a defender in the third and fourth tiers of Italian football.

== Club career ==
Grimaldi joined Sassuolo in 2004, from Serie B club Perugia, in a co-ownership deal. Grimaldi was the starting right-back of the team. He played in 2005, 2006 and 2007 playoffs. In the last season, which Sassuolo became the group stage champion of 2007–08 Serie C1, Grimaldi only played 12 times. However Grimaldi was able to play in the 2008 Supercoppa di Lega di Prima Divisione, winning Salernitana to become the grand champion of the third division. At the start of 2008–09 Serie B, Grimaldi picked the no.23 shirt, but left the club on loan on 1 September 2008.

In July 2009 he was signed by Paganese.

== International career ==
Grimaldi was an unused member of the Italy national under-16 football team during the team's 2001 UEFA European Under-16 Football Championship qualification campaign. The following season, UEFA changed the age limit to under-17 and 19 respectively. Grimaldi was capped for the first time ever with the reformed Italy U18 side, a feeder team of the U19 side, on 20 March 2002. Grimaldi came on as a substitute for Mauro Belotti in the 77th minute. He was not called up to the U19 squad for the 2003 UEFA European Under-19 Football Championship qualification in 2002–03 season, however.

== Honours ==
Sassuolo

- Supercoppa di Lega di Prima Divisione: 2008
- Lega Pro Prima Divisione: 2008
