= Paolo Bianco =

Italian footballer (born 1977)

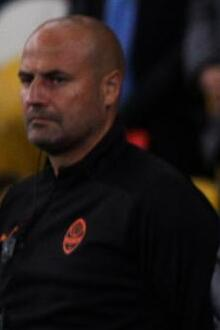
- Bianco with Shakhtar Donetsk in 2021

Personal information
- Date of birth: 20 August 1977 (age 49)
- Place of birth: Foggia, Italy
- Height: 1.84 m (6 ft 0 in)
- Position: Defender

Team information
- Current team: Pisa (head coach)

Youth career
- 1992–1994: Foggia

Senior career*
| Years | Team | Apps | (Gls) |
| 1994–1999 | Foggia | 98 | (1) |
| 1999–2004 | Treviso | 148 | (8) |
| 2004–2006 | Catania | 72 | (2) |
| 2006–2009 | Cagliari | 91 | (4) |
| 2009–2010 | Atalanta | 21 | (0) |
| 2010–2015 | Sassuolo | 96 | (0) |

International career
| 1998 | Italy U21 | 1 | (0) |

Managerial career
- 2015–2016: Sassuolo U19 (assistant)
- 2016–2017: Sassuolo (assistant)
- 2017–2018: Siracusa
- 2018: Leonzio
- 2019–2021: Sassuolo (technical coach)
- 2021–2022: Shakhtar Donetsk (technical coach)
- 2022–2023: Juventus (technical coach)
- 2023–2024: Modena
- 2025: Frosinone
- 2025–2026: Monza
- 2026–: Pisa
- * Club domestic league appearances and goals

Paolo Bianco (born 20 August 1977) is an Italian professional football coach and a former player who is the head coach of Serie B club Pisa. He played for several Serie A clubs as a defender.

== Club areer ==
=== Foggia ===
Bianco started his career within the junior ranks of Foggia in the Italian Serie B. In 1994, he was promoted to the first team and began to make official league appearances for his hometown club. He did not manage to break into the club's starting line-up in his first season, making just 13 appearances. Eventually, he made well over 100 appearances for the club in all competitions and netted two official goals. He was transferred to the Serie B side Treviso in the summer of 1999 for an undisclosed transfer fee.

=== Treviso ===
Bianco's transfer to the northern club was a big step in the player's career, as he instantly became a key team member and eventually earned the captain's armband for his club. In his first season in Treviso, Bianco made 16 appearances and followed up with 22 starts the following season. However, his efforts were not enough to save his club from relegation, and he spent the next two seasons in the Serie C1. After 60 Serie C1 appearances, Bianco captained his team to promotion back into the Italian second division and made 44 appearances for the club that season, more than any other player in the team. After five seasons with the club, Bianco made 148 league appearances alone and scored six goals while making over 160 appearances for his club in all competitions. His good form led to a 2004 transfer to Serie B rivals Catania.

=== Catania ===
The player arrived at the Sicilian club in the summer of 2004. He became a regular fixture in the club's line-up and made 37 league appearances in his first season in Sicily. His impressive displays continued the following season as he made an additional 35 league appearances and helped guide the club to a second-place finish in the Serie B table and, hence, Serie A promotion. Despite helping to lead the club into the Serie A, the player was loaned to fellow Serie A side Cagliari in August 2006.

=== Cagliari ===
Following his transfer from one Italian island to the other, the defender was instantly inserted into the Sardinian club's starting eleven. His Serie A debut came against his former side, Catania. In his first season in the top flight, Bianco made 35 league appearances and scored a solo goal. In June 2007, the club excised the rights to buy him. His second season, proved to be much of the same as the player made 31 appearances as both a central defender and a right back. Bianco entered the 2008–09 Serie A campaign with just one year left on his contract. In January 2010, he signed a pre-contract with Atalanta.

=== Atalanta ===
Bianco made the move to Bergamo following the expiration of his contract with Cagliari on 1 July 2009. In his first season with Atalanta, Bianco made 21 league appearances, with 20 coming from the starting XI. Despite a close relegation battle towards the end of the 2009–10 campaign, between Livorno, Siena, Atalanta, Chievo, Udinese and Bologna, his club failed in their efforts to avoid the bad fate. On 19 July 2010, his contract was terminated in mutual consent.

=== Sassuolo ===
Bianco made his debut on Sassuolo's defeat against Portogruaro. Bianco was re-signed by Sassuolo on a one-year contract on 17 July 2014.

== Managerial career ==
He was appointed head coach of Leonzio in Serie C on 18 June 2018. On 9 December 2018, he resigned from Sicula Leonzio, with the club in 10th place in the table. In October 2019, Bianco was hired as a part of Roberto De Zerbi's first team technical staff at Sassuolo.

After having worked as a technical collaborator for Juventus, on 14 June 2023, Bianco was unveiled as the new head coach of Serie B club Modena on a two-year contract. He was dismissed on 13 April 2024 following a negative string of results. On 18 January 2025, Bianco was appointed manager of Frosinone Calcio.

On 11 June 2025, he signed with Monza, a team relegated from the top division to Serie B. He led them back to Serie A at the end of the season.

On 22 June 2026, Bianco was hired by Pisa, returning to Serie B.
