= Angelo Rea =

Italian footballer (born 1982)

Personal information
- Date of birth: 16 June 1982 (age 44)
- Place of birth: Pomigliano d'Arco, Italy
- Height: 6 ft 1 in (1.85 m)
- Position: Centre back

Team information
- Current team: Lecco

Senior career*
Years	Team	Apps	(Gls)
2001–2006	Cesena	68	(1)
2006–2008	Messina	46	(0)
2008–2012	Sassuolo	66	(3)
2012	→ Nocerina (loan)	14	(0)
2012–2015	Varese	64	(5)
2015–2016	Avellino	14	(0)
2016–2017	Messina	23	(1)
2017	Vibonese	0	(0)
2017–	Lecco	9	(1)
- * Club domestic league appearances and goals as of 24 February 2017

Angelo Rea (born 16 June 1982) is an Italian footballer who is currently playing as a defender for Calcio Lecco 1912.

== Career ==
Rea signed a 2+1 year contract with Avellino on 13 June 2015.
