= 2005–06 Serie C2 =

Italian football league season

Geographical distribution of 2005-06 Serie C2 teams. Serie C2/A teams are depicted with red dots, Serie C2/B with green, and Serie C2/C with yellow ones.

The 2005–06 Serie C2 was the football league season of Italian Serie C2 for the years 2005 and 2006. It was divided into two phases: the regular season, played from August 28, 2005 to May 7, 2006, and the playoff phase. Once the regular season was over teams placed 2nd to 5th entered a playoff to determine the second team in each division to be promoted to Serie C1. At the same time, teams placed 14th to 17th entered a playout for the right to remain in Serie C2 the following season.

As usual, Serie C2 was composed by three divisions, whose teams were divided geographically. Division C2/A was mainly composed by Northern Italy and Sardinian teams, whereas division C2/B included North-Central and Central Italy teams, with the exception of two teams from Campania (Benevento and Cavese), and division C2/C was represented by teams hailing from Central-Southern Italy and Sicily.

Teams finishing first in the regular season, plus one team winning the playoff round from each division were promoted to Serie C1; teams finishing last in the regular season, plus two relegation playoff losers from each division were relegated to Serie D, losing also their professional club status. In all, six teams were promoted to Serie C1, and nine teams were relegated to Serie D.

== Teams ==
The season originally features 9 teams from Serie D, 6 teams from Serie C1 and 41 teams from last season Serie C2. However, COVISOC had expelled Calcio Como S.p.A., A.C. Imolese S.r.l., Polisportiva Rosetana Calcio S.r.l., A.S. Sora S.r.l., Vis Pesaro 1898 S.r.l. and Serie D Group B winner U.S. Canzese. Moreover, Monza, Chieti, Juve Stabia and San Marino Calcio were promoted to Serie C1 to fill the vacancies. The 10 vacancies was replaced by U.S. Città di Jesolo and Calcio Lecco 1912 from Serie D, as well as phoenix clubs that recreated by Lodo Petrucci: Andria, Benevento, Reggiana, SPAL and Venezia were relegated from 2005–06 Serie C1 to Serie C2, as well as on 19 August Biellese was readmitted from Serie D, which the team was relegated. Overall, the changes made the division had restored from 56 teams to 54 teams, or 18 teams in 3 groups, features 1 team from Serie B, 6 teams from Serie C1, 37 teams from Serie C2 and 10 teams from Serie D.

=== Group A ===
Team	Home city	Stadium	Capacity	2004–05 season
Bassano	Bassano			▲1st in Serie D Group C, Grand Champions (promoted)
Biellese	Biellese			15th in Serie C2 Group A (play-out loser, wild card)
Carpenedolo	Carpenedolo			9th in Serie C2 Group A
Casale	Casale			16th in Serie C2 Group A (play-out winner)
Cuneo	Cuneo			▲1st in Serie D Group A (promoted)
Ivrea	Ivrea			11th in Serie C2 Group A
Jesolo	Jesolo			▲3rd in Serie D Group C (wild card, play-off winner)
Legnano	Legnano			7th in Serie C2 Group A
Lecco	Lecco			▲2nd in Serie D Group B (wild card, play-off winner)
Montichiari	Montichiari			10th in Serie C2 Group A
Olbia	Olbia			12th in Serie C2 Group A
Pergocrema	Crema			▲1st in Serie D Group D (promoted)
Pro Vercelli	Vercelli			17th in Serie C2 Group A (Play-out winner)
Portogruaro	Portogruaro			13th in Serie C2 Group A
Sanremese	Sanremo			6th in Serie C2 Group A
South Tyrol	Bolzano			8th in Serie C2 Group A
Valenzana	Valenzana			4th in Serie C2 Group A (Play-off losing finalists)
Venezia	Venice			▼20th in Serie B (relegated, bankruptcy, wild card)

== Standings ==
=== Serie C2/A ===
Final table

Pos	Team	Pld	W	D	L	GF	GA	GD	Pts	Promotion or relegation
1	Venezia (P, C)	34	20	9	5	49	27	+22	69	Promoted to Serie C1
2	Cuneo	34	18	10	6	44	27	+17	64	Lost in promotion playoffs
3	Ivrea (P)	34	15	15	4	34	23	+11	60	Won promotion playoffs
4	Alto Adige	34	14	13	7	36	27	+9	55	Lost in promotion playoffs
5	Carpenedolo	34	13	14	7	36	27	+9	53	Lost in promotion playoffs
6	Pro Vercelli	34	13	11	10	35	30	+5	50	
7	Sanremese	34	11	13	10	33	34	−1	46	
8	Pergocrema	34	10	15	9	35	33	+2	45	
9	Valenzana	34	10	12	12	36	35	+1	42	
10	Lecco	34	9	14	11	32	32	0	41	
11	Legnano	34	11	8	15	34	35	−1	41	
12	Montichiari	34	10	10	14	30	27	+3	40	
13	Bassano Virtus	34	8	16	10	37	36	+1	40	
14	Jesolo (R)	34	8	14	12	38	44	−6	38	Lost relegation playoff
15	Portosummaga (R)	34	8	14	12	34	40	−6	38	Lost relegation playoff
16	Biellese	34	7	12	15	28	51	−23	33	Won relegation playoff
17	Olbia	34	6	12	16	30	46	−16	30	Won relegation playoff
18	Casale (R)	34	3	12	19	21	48	−27	21	Relegated to Serie D

(C) Champions; (P) Promoted; (R) Relegated

=== Serie C2/B ===
Final table

Pos	Team	Pld	W	D	L	GF	GA	GD	Pts	Promotion or relegation
1	Cavese (P, C)	34	18	12	4	47	18	+29	66	Promoted to Serie C1
2	Sassuolo (P)	34	16	9	9	43	32	+11	57	Won promotion playoffs
3	Sansovino	34	14	14	6	31	25	+6	56	Lost in promotion playoffs
4	Benevento	34	13	10	11	35	34	+1	49	Lost in promotion playoffs
5	Ancona	34	12	12	10	31	26	+5	48	Lost in promotion playoffs
6	Cuoiocappiano	34	12	11	11	34	34	0	47	
7	Castelnuovo	34	10	15	9	31	29	+2	45	
8	Reggiana	34	9	17	8	30	27	+3	44	
9	Bellaria Igea	34	11	11	12	34	33	+1	44	
10	Foligno	34	11	11	12	37	42	−5	44	
11	SPAL	34	10	13	11	40	37	+3	43	
12	Gubbio	34	10	13	11	33	32	+1	43	
13	Gualdo	34	11	10	13	43	47	−4	43	
14	Carrarese	34	10	12	12	27	32	−5	42	Won relegation playoff
15	Prato	34	9	10	15	27	38	−11	37	Won relegation playoff
16	Montevarchi (R)	34	7	15	12	26	33	−7	36	Lost relegation playoff
17	Castel San Pietro (R)	34	6	16	12	38	46	−8	34	Lost relegation playoff
18	Forlì (R)	34	4	15	15	20	42	−22	27	Relegated to Serie D

(C) Champions; (P) Promoted; (R) Relegated

=== Serie C2/C ===
Final table

Pos	Team	Pld	W	D	L	GF	GA	GD	Pts	Promotion or relegation
1	Gallipoli (P, C)	34	20	8	6	56	22	+34	68	Promoted to Serie C1
2	Taranto (P)	34	16	10	8	35	23	+12	58	Won promotion playoffs
3	Rende	34	15	10	9	43	36	+7	55	Lost in promotion playoffs
4	Pro Vasto	34	13	16	5	38	27	+11	55	Lost in promotion playoffs
5	Melfi	34	15	10	9	46	32	+14	55	Lost in promotion playoffs
6	Cisco Roma	34	14	13	7	37	26	+11	55	
7	Viterbese	34	14	11	9	32	35	−3	51 (Note: including 2 points deduction)	
8	Giugliano	34	11	13	10	41	38	+3	46	
9	Real Marcianise	34	11	10	13	32	35	−3	43	
10	Vigor Lamezia	34	11	10	13	35	39	−4	43	
11	Andria	34	11	10	13	31	35	−4	43	
12	Igea Virtus	34	10	11	13	40	45	−5	41	
13	Nocerina	34	8	16	10	35	37	−2	40	
14	Rieti	34	10	9	15	27	34	−7	39	Won relegation playoff
15	Potenza	34	10	11	13	31	38	−7	39	Won relegation playoff
16	Modica (R)	34	7	10	17	30	44	−14	31	Lost relegation playoff
17	Latina (R)	34	6	12	16	26	43	−17	28	Lost relegation playoff
18	Vittoria (R)	34	5	8	21	21	47	−26	23	Relegated to Serie D

(C) Champions; (P) Promoted; (R) Relegated

== Promotion and relegation playoffs ==
=== Serie C2/A ===
==== Promotion ====
Promotion playoff semifinals
First legs played May 21, 2007; return legs played May 28, 2007

Team 1	Agg.	Team 2	1st leg	2nd leg
Carpenedolo (5)	2-1	(2) Cuneo	2-1	0-0
Alto Adige (4)	2-2	(3) Ivrea	1-1	1-1

Promotion playoff finals
First leg played June 4, 2007; return leg played June 11, 2007

Team 1	Agg.	Team 2	1st leg	2nd leg
Carpenedolo (5)	2-2(aet)	(3) Ivrea	1-1	1-1

Ivrea promoted to Serie C1

==== Relegation ====
Relegation playoffs
First legs played May 21, 2007; return legs played May 28, 2007

Team 1	Agg.	Team 2	1st leg	2nd leg
Olbia (17)	3-2	(14) Jesolo	2-1	1-1
Biellese (16)	1-0	(15) Portosummaga	1-0	0-0

Jesolo and Portosummaga relegated to Serie D

=== Serie C2/B ===
==== Promotion ====
Promotion playoff semifinals
First legs played May 21, 2007; return legs played May 28, 2007

Team 1	Agg.	Team 2	1st leg	2nd leg
Ancona (5)	3-3	(2) Sassuolo	2-3	1-0
Benevento (4)	0-2	(3) Sansovino	0-0	0-2

Promotion playoff finals
First leg played June 4, 2007; return leg played June 11, 2007

Team 1	Agg.	Team 2	1st leg	2nd leg
Sansovino (3)	2-3	(2) Sassuolo	2-2	0-1

Sassuolo promoted to Serie C1

==== Relegation ====
Relegation playoffs
First legs played May 27, 2007; return legs played June 3, 2007

Team 1	Agg.	Team 2	1st leg	2nd leg
Castel San Pietro (17)	2-2	(14) Carrarese	1-1	1-1
Montevarchi (16)	1-1	(15) Prato	0-0	1-1

Castel San Pietro and Montevarchi relegated to Serie D

=== Serie C2/C ===
==== Promotion ====
Promotion playoff semifinals
First legs played May 21, 2007; return legs played May 28, 2007

Team 1	Agg.	Team 2	1st leg	2nd leg
Melfi (5)	3-3	(2) Taranto	3-1	0-2
Pro Vasto (4)	1-2	(3) Rende	1-1	0-1

Promotion playoff finals
First leg played June 4, 2007; return leg played June 11, 2007

Team 1	Agg.	Team 2	1st leg	2nd leg
Rende (3)	1-2	(2) Taranto	1-1	0-1

Taranto promoted to Serie C1

==== Relegation ====
Relegation playoffs
First legs played May 27, 2007; return legs played June 3, 2007

Team 1	Agg.	Team 2	1st leg	2nd leg
Latina (17)	0-1	(14) Rieti	0-0	0-1
Modica (16)	3-4	(15) Potenza	3-3	0-1

Latina and Modica relegated to Serie D
