= 2007–08 Serie C1 =

Football league season

Geographical distribution of 2007-08 Serie C1 teams. Serie C1/A teams are depicted with red dots, whereas Serie C1/B ones were represented with yellow.

The 2007–08 Serie C1 season was the thirtieth football league season of Italian Serie C1 since its establishment in 1978. It was divided into two phases: the regular season, played from September 2007 to May 2008, and the playoff phase from May to June 2008.

The league was composed of 36 teams divided into two divisions of 18 teams each, whose teams were divided mainly according to geographical principles.

Teams finishing first in the regular season, plus one team winning the playoff round from each division were promoted to Serie B; teams finishing last in the regular season, plus two relegation playoff losers from each division, were relegated to Serie C2. In all, four teams (Sassuolo, Cittadella, Salernitana, and Ancona) were promoted to Serie B, and six teams (Pro Patria, Lecco, Manfredonia, Lanciano, Sangiovannese, and Martina) were relegated to Serie C2.

== Events ==
The line-up was announced on 19 July 2007. No teams were excluded, and all the originally scheduled teams will therefore take part in the league.

The league featured four teams relegated from Serie B in 2006-07 (Verona, Arezzo, Crotone and Pescara) and six promoted from Serie C2 (Legnano, Foligno, Sorrento, Lecco, Paganese and Potenza).

The divisions' composition was confirmed as usual according to latitude. However, a number of South teams were included in a division different from their best fitting one in order to reduce the number of potentially heated local derbies. This caused all Tuscan clubs to be included in the Serie C1/B division, otherwise composed mostly by teams hailing from South of Italy, whereas two teams from Campania and two from Apulia were included in the Serie C1/A, which instead features mostly teams from the North.

=== Promotions ===
On 27 April 2008, with one week in the regular season yet to be played, both Sassuolo and Salernitana were mathematically ensured of their respective division titles, thus winning promotion to Serie B for the 2008-09 season.

== Clubs ==
=== Serie C1/A ===
| Club | City | Stadium | 2006/2007 Season |
|---|---|---|---|
| S.S. Cavese 1919 | Cava de' Tirreni | Stadio Simonetta Lamberti | 3rd in Serie C1/B |
| A.S. Cittadella | Cittadella | Stadio Pier Cesare Tombolato | 6th in Serie C1/A |
| U.S. Cremonese | Cremona | Stadio Giovanni Zini | 13th in Serie C1/A |
| U.S. Foggia | Foggia | Stadio Pino Zaccheria | 4th in Serie C1/B |
| Foligno Calcio | Foligno | Stadio Enzo Blasone | 1st in Serie C2/B |
| Calcio Lecco 1912 | Lecco | Stadio Rigamonti-Ceppi | 2nd in Serie C2/A |
| A.C. Legnano | Legnano | Stadio Giovanni Mari | 1st in Serie C2/A |
| S.S. Manfredonia Calcio | Manfredonia | Stadio Miramare | 9th in Serie C1/B |
| A.C. Monza Brianza 1912 | Monza | Stadio Brianteo | 5th in Serie C1/A |
| Novara Calcio | Novara | Stadio Silvio Piola | 10th in Serie C1/A |
| Calcio Padova | Padua | Stadio Euganeo | 7th in Serie C1/A |
| Paganese Calcio 1926 | Pagani | Stadio Marcello Torre | 4th in Serie C2/B |
| Pro Patria | Busto Arsizio | Stadio Carlo Speroni | 12th in Serie C1/A |
| A.C. Pro Sesto | Sesto San Giovanni | Stadio Breda | 14th in Serie C1/A |
| U.S. Sassuolo Calcio | Sassuolo | Stadio Enzo Ricci | 2nd in Serie C1/A |
| Ternana Calcio | Terni | Stadio Libero Liberati | 13th in Serie C1/B |
| S.S.C. Venezia | Venice | Stadio Pier Luigi Penzo | 4th in Serie C1/A |
| Hellas Verona F.C. | Verona | Stadio Marcantonio Bentegodi | 18th in Serie B |

=== Serie C1/B ===
| Club | City | Stadium | 2006/2007 Season |
|---|---|---|---|
| A.C. Ancona | Ancona | Stadio del Conero | 16th in Serie C1/B |
| A.C. Arezzo | Arezzo | Stadio Città di Arezzo | 20th in Serie B |
| F.C. Crotone | Crotone | Stadio Ezio Scida | 21st in Serie B |
| Gallipoli Calcio | Gallipoli | Stadio Antonio Bianco | 11th in Serie C1/B |
| S.S. Juve Stabia | Castellammare di Stabia | Stadio Romeo Menti | 7th in Serie C1/B |
| S.S. Lanciano | Lanciano | Stadio Guido Biondi | 12th in Serie C1/B |
| A.S. Lucchese-Libertas | Lucca | Stadio Porta Elisa | 8th in Serie C1/A |
| A.C. Martina | Martina Franca | Stadio Gian Domenico Tursi | 14th in Serie C1/B |
| U.S. Massese 1919 | Massa | Stadio degli Oliveti | 11th in Serie C1/A |
| Perugia Calcio | Perugia | Stadio Renato Curi | 6th in Serie C1/B |
| Pescara Calcio | Pescara | Stadio Adriatico | 22nd in Serie B |
| A.C. Pistoiese | Pistoia | Stadio Marcello Melani | 9th in Serie C1/A |
| Potenza S.C. | Potenza | Stadio Alfredo Viviani | 3rd in Serie C2/C |
| Salernitana Calcio 1919 | Salerno | Stadio Arechi | 10th in Serie C1/B |
| S.S. Sambenedettese Calcio | San Benedetto del Tronto | Stadio Riviera delle Palme | 8th in Serie C1/B |
| A.C. Sangiovannese 1927 | San Giovanni Valdarno | Stadio Virgilio Fedini | 15th in Serie C1/A |
| Sorrento Calcio | Sorrento | Stadio Italia | 1st in Serie C2/C |
| Taranto Sport | Taranto | Stadio Erasmo Iacovone | 5th in Serie C1/B |

== Final standings ==
=== Serie C1/A ===
| Pos | Team | Pld | W | D | L | GF | GA | GD | Pts | Promotion or relegation |
|---|---|---|---|---|---|---|---|---|---|---|
| 1 | Sassuolo (C, P) | 34 | 19 | 6 | 9 | 46 | 32 | +14 | 63 | Direct promotion to Serie B |
| 2 | Cremonese | 34 | 16 | 12 | 6 | 50 | 36 | +14 | 60 | Lost in Promotion playoffs |
| 3 | Cittadella (P) | 34 | 15 | 13 | 6 | 52 | 34 | +18 | 58 | Promoted to Serie B |
| 4 | Foligno | 34 | 15 | 12 | 7 | 38 | 30 | +8 | 57 | Lost in Promotion playoffs |
| 5 | Foggia | 34 | 15 | 11 | 8 | 47 | 34 | +13 | 56 | Lost in Promotion playoffs |
| 6 | Padova | 34 | 14 | 13 | 7 | 57 | 37 | +20 | 55 | |
| 7 | Legnano | 34 | 13 | 9 | 12 | 42 | 34 | +8 | 48 | |
| 8 | Monza | 34 | 11 | 13 | 10 | 38 | 35 | +3 | 46 | |
| 9 | Novara | 34 | 12 | 10 | 12 | 44 | 52 | −8 | 46 | |
| 10 | Cavese | 34 | 11 | 11 | 12 | 44 | 44 | 0 | 44 | |
| 11 | Pro Sesto | 34 | 11 | 10 | 13 | 42 | 45 | −3 | 43 | |
| 12 | Venezia | 34 | 13 | 5 | 16 | 38 | 41 | −3 | 43 (Note: 1 point deduction) | |
| 13 | Ternana | 34 | 11 | 8 | 15 | 34 | 40 | −6 | 41 | |
| 14 | Pro Patria (R) | 34 | 7 | 17 | 10 | 33 | 35 | −2 | 38 | Lost relegation playoffs |
| 15 | Paganese | 34 | 7 | 11 | 16 | 26 | 41 | −15 | 32 | Won relegation playoffs |
| 16 | Lecco (R) | 34 | 8 | 8 | 18 | 30 | 48 | −18 | 32 | Lost relegation playoffs |
| 17 | Verona | 34 | 7 | 10 | 17 | 24 | 41 | −17 | 31 | Won relegation playoffs |
| 18 | Manfredonia (R) | 34 | 8 | 7 | 19 | 24 | 50 | −26 | 31 | Direct relegation to Serie C2 |

(C) Champions; (P) Promoted; (R) Relegated

=== Serie C1/B ===
| Pos | Team | Pld | W | D | L | GF | GA | GD | Pts | Promotion or relegation |
|---|---|---|---|---|---|---|---|---|---|---|
| 1 | Salernitana (C, P) | 34 | 16 | 14 | 4 | 43 | 25 | +18 | 62 | Direct promotion to Serie B |
| 2 | Ancona (P) | 34 | 15 | 12 | 7 | 43 | 26 | +17 | 57 | Promoted to Serie B |
| 3 | Taranto | 34 | 14 | 13 | 7 | 47 | 31 | +16 | 55 | Lost in Promotion playoffs |
| 4 | Crotone | 34 | 14 | 13 | 7 | 45 | 30 | +15 | 55 | Lost in Promotion playoffs |
| 5 | Perugia | 34 | 15 | 8 | 11 | 35 | 34 | +1 | 53 | Lost in Promotion playoffs |
| 6 | Arezzo | 34 | 13 | 14 | 7 | 42 | 32 | +10 | 53 | |
| 7 | Pescara | 34 | 15 | 9 | 10 | 47 | 36 | +11 | 53 (Note: 1 point deduction) | |
| 8 | Lucchese | 34 | 12 | 15 | 7 | 36 | 30 | +6 | 51 | |
| 9 | Gallipoli | 34 | 12 | 10 | 12 | 51 | 44 | +7 | 46 | |
| 10 | Sorrento | 34 | 10 | 14 | 10 | 29 | 30 | −1 | 44 | |
| 11 | Potenza | 34 | 10 | 10 | 14 | 34 | 38 | −4 | 40 | |
| 12 | Sambenedettese | 34 | 9 | 13 | 12 | 32 | 39 | −7 | 40 | |
| 13 | Massese | 34 | 9 | 13 | 12 | 34 | 43 | −9 | 40 | |
| 14 | Pistoiese | 34 | 7 | 13 | 14 | 27 | 38 | −11 | 34 | Won relegation playoffs |
| 15 | Juve Stabia | 34 | 7 | 12 | 15 | 34 | 42 | −8 | 33 | Won relegation playoffs |
| 16 | Lanciano (R) | 34 | 9 | 15 | 10 | 30 | 34 | −4 | 32 (Note: 10 points deduction) | Lost relegation playoffs |
| 17 | Sangiovannese (R) | 34 | 6 | 11 | 17 | 24 | 48 | −24 | 29 | Lost relegation playoffs |
| 18 | Martina (R) | 34 | 4 | 9 | 21 | 25 | 58 | −33 | 20 | Direct relegation to Serie C2 |

(C) Champions; (P) Promoted; (R) Relegated

== Promotion and relegation playoffs ==
=== Serie C1/A ===
==== Promotion ====
Promotion playoff semifinals
First legs played 18 May 2008; return legs played 25 May 2008
(due to aggregate tie, higher classified team won)

| Team 1 | Agg. | Team 2 | 1st leg | 2nd leg |
|---|---|---|---|---|
| Foggia (5) | 1-1 | (2) Cremonese | 0-0 | 1-1 |
| Foligno (4) | 1-2 | (3) Cittadella | 1-0 | 0-2 |

Promotion playoff finals
First leg played 1 June 2008; return leg played 8 June 2008

| Team 1 | Agg. | Team 2 | 1st leg | 2nd leg |
|---|---|---|---|---|
| Cittadella (3) | 3-2 | (2) Cremonese | 0-1 | 3-1 |

Cittadella promoted to Serie B

==== Relegation ====
Relegation playoffs
First legs played 18 May 2008; return legs played 25 May 2008

| Team 1 | Agg. | Team 2 | 1st leg | 2nd leg |
|---|---|---|---|---|
| Verona (17) | 2-1 | 14) Pro Patria | 1-0 | 1-1 |
| Lecco (16) | 1-2 | (15) Paganese | 1-0 | 0-2 |

Pro Patria and Lecco relegated to Serie C2

=== Serie C1/B ===
==== Promotion ====
Promotion playoff semifinals
First legs played 18 May 2008; return legs played 25 May 2008
(due to aggregate tie, higher classified team won)

| Team 1 | Agg. | Team 2 | 1st leg | 2nd leg |
|---|---|---|---|---|
| Perugia (5) | 3-3 | (2) Ancona | 3-1 | 0-2 |
| Crotone (4) | 3-4 | (3) Taranto | 3-2 | 0-2 |

Promotion playoff finals
First leg played 1 June 2008; return leg played 8 June 2008

| Team 1 | Agg. | Team 2 | 1st leg | 2nd leg |
|---|---|---|---|---|
| Taranto (3) | 1-2 | (2) Ancona | 0-0 | 1-2 |

Ancona promoted to Serie B

==== Relegation ====
Relegation playoffs
First legs played 18 May 2008; return legs played 25 May 2008

| Team 1 | Agg. | Team 2 | 1st leg | 2nd leg |
|---|---|---|---|---|
| Sangiovannese (17) | 0-4 | (14) Pistoiese | 0-3 | 0-1 |
| Lanciano (16) | 0-1 | (15) Juve Stabia | 0-1 | 0-0 |

Sangiovannese and Lanciano relegated to Serie C2
