= 2004–05 Serie C2 =

Italian football league season

The Serie C2 2004-2005 was the twenty-seventh edition of the minor professional competition of the present-day Serie C.

Rules

Three independent championships (North, Centre, South). In each group: first team promoted, last team relegated, one more promoted team in a playoff of four teams, two more relegated teams in a two-legged playoff.

== Group A (North) ==
		A	Pt	G	V	N	P	GF	GS
15px	1.	Pro Sesto (P)	56	34	16	8	10	39	30
15px	2.	Calcio Pizzighettone(O,P)	55	34	15	10	4	44	39
	3.	Calcio Monza (T,P)	53	34	14	11	9	30	21
	4.	Valenzana	53	34	14	11	9	38	30
	5.	Sassuolo	52	34	14	10	10	40	35
	6.	Sanremese	51	34	12	15	7	27	25
	7.	Calcio Legnano	50	34	13	11	10	32	29
	8.	Sudtirol-Alto Adige	48	34	11	15	8	42	30
	9.	Calcio Carpenedolo	45	34	11	12	11	44	38
	10.	Calcio Montichiari	43	34	9	16	9	37	38
	11.	Ivrea	42	34	10	12	12	38	35
	12.	Olbia	42	34	10	12	12	28	30
	13.	Portosummaga	42	34	11	9	14	41	45
15px	14.	Calcio Palazzolo(R)	41	34	9	14	11	32	37
15px	15.	Biellese (T)	40	34	9	13	12	31	34
	16.	Calcio Casale	37	34	7	16	11	25	34
	17.	Pro Vercelli	33	34	7	12	15	29	46
15px	18.	Belluno (R)	26	34	5	11	18	21	45

=== Play-off A ===
Semifinal

	Result		date
Sassuolo	0-1	Pizzighettone	Sassuolo, 29 May 2005
Pizighettone	1-1	Sassuolo	Pizzighettone, 5 June 2005
Valenzana	0-0	Monza	Valenza, 29 May 2005
Monza	2-3	Valenzana	Monza, 5 June 2005

Final

	Result		date
Valenzana	0-2	Pizzighettone	Valenza, 12 June 2005
Pizzighettone	2-2	Valenzana	Pizzighettone, 19 June 2005

=== Play-out ===
	Result		date
Pro Vercelli	0 - 0	Palazzolo	Vercelli, 29 May 2005
Palazzolo	0 - 1	Pro Vercelli	Palazzolo sull'Oglio, 5 June 2005
Casale	0 - 0	Biellese	Casale Monferrato, 29 May 2005
Biellese	1 - 3	Casale	Biella, 5 June 2005

== Group B (Centre) ==
    team                   Points
 1. MASSESE                     75                Promoted to Serie C1
----------------------------------
 2. RAVENNA                     64                Promoted to Serie C1 after playoff
 3. Cisco Lodigiani             63
 4. San Marino                  61
Promoted by The FIGC
 5. Forlì                       61
----------------------------------
 6. Gubbio                      60
 7. Carrarese                   58
 8. Cuoiopelli                  57
 9. Montevarchi                 51
10. Castelnuovo                 50
11. Ancona                      49
12. Bellaria Igea Marina        45
13. Castel San Pietro           44
14. Sansovino                   44
15. Imolese                     43
Bankruptcy
----------------------------------
16. Tolentino                   41                Relegated to Serie D after playout
17. Fano                        41                Relegated to Serie D after playout
18. Gualdo                      41
19. Viterbo                     40
----------------------------------
20. Aglianese                   17                Relegated to Serie D

== Group C (South) ==
    Team                    Points
 1. MANFREDONIA                 72                Promoted to Serie C1
----------------------------------
 2. Juve Stabia                 71
 3. GELA                        67                Promoted to Serie C1 after playoff
 4. Giugliano                   58
 5. Cavese                      58
----------------------------------
 6. Melfi                       48
 7. Potenza                     47
 8. Vigor Lamezia               44
 9. Pro Vasto                   43
10. Rosetana                    43 (1)
Bankruptcy
11. Rende                       43
12. Latina                      42
13. Igea Virtus                 42
----------------------------------
14. Morro d'Oro                 40                Relegated to Serie D after play-out
15. Ragusa                      34                Relegated to Serie D after play-out
16. Taranto                     27                
17. Nocerina                    26                
----------------------------------
18. Castel di Sangro            23                Relegated and disbanded

(1) 2 points less

== Play-Off ==
- Gir. B: Forlì-Ravenna 1-1,1-3
- Gir. B: San Marino-Cisco Lodigiani 2-1, 0-2
- Gir. C: Cavese-Juve Stabia 1-0, 0-0
- Gir. C: Giugliano-Gela 0-0, 0-2

== Final Play-Off ==
- Gir. B: Lodigiani-Ravenna 1-1, 0-2
- Gir. C: Cavese-Gela 0-0, 0-1 (d.t.s.)

== Play-Out ==
- Gir. B: Fano-Gualdo 1-1, 0-1
- Gir. B: Viterbo-Tolentino 3-0, 1-0
- Gir. C: Nocerina-Morro d'Oro 2-1, 1-1
- Gir. C: Taranto-Ragusa 2-1, 2-1

== References and sources ==
- Almanacco Illustrato del Calcio - La Storia 1898-2004, Panini Edizioni, Modena, September 2005

Specific
