= Serie C2 =

Association football league

- Founded: 1978 as Serie C2; Lega Pro Seconda Divisione from 2008
- Folded: 2014
- Country: Italy
- Confederation: Lega Pro (FIGC)
- Number of clubs: 18 for each group: 72 (until 1991, 4 groups); 54 (until 2011, 3 groups); 36 (until 2014, 2 groups)
- Level on pyramid: 4
- Promotion to: Serie C1
- Relegation to: Serie D
- Domestic cup(s): Coppa Italia Serie C Supercoppa di Serie C2
- Most championships: Mantova, Messina, Prato, Siena, Varese (3 each)
- Website: www.lega-pro.com

Serie C2 was the fourth highest football league in Italy, the lowest with a professional status.

== History ==
Before the 1978–79 season, there were only three professional football leagues in Italy, the third being Serie C. The league menaging the C was also organizing the semi-professional Serie D. In 1978, it was decided to split the Serie C into Serie C1 (the third highest league) and Serie C2, a new tournament including the worst C and the best D clubs. Upon its inception in 1978–79, Serie C2 consisted of four groups of 18 teams, with two promotions and three relegations. During the season, teams only played the other teams in their division, according to the round robin method. The remnants of the Serie D were later, in 1981, moved to the amatorial sector as Campionato Interregionale, with the elimination of the semi-professional sector.

The groups were reduced to three from the start of the 1991–92 season. More notably, play-offs were introduced for the second promotion and the penultimate and the third relegation, together with the 3-victory-points rule. After the 2007–08 season, the league was known as Lega Pro Seconda Divisione.

In the 2011–12 season, there were 41 teams divided geographically into two divisions of 20 and 21. Group A covered northern Italy, Group B central and southern Italy. The following year it consisted of 36 teams.

The reform, already decided by the FIGC, lead to the reunification with the Serie C1 starting from 2014–15 and with the subsequent rebirth of the third tier championship with 60 teams divided into three groups of 20 as Serie C.

== Champions ==
=== Seasons from 1978–79 to 1990–91 ===
Season	Group A Winner	Group B Winner	Group C Winner	Group D Winner
1978–79	Sanremese	Cremapergo	Fano	Rende
1979–80	Prato	Modena	Giulianova	Cosenza
1980–81	Rhodense	Padova	Casertana	Campania
1981–82	Carrarese	Ancona	Siena	Barletta
1982–83	Prato	Legnano	Francavilla	Messina
1983–84	Livorno	Pavia	Jesi	Reggina
1984–85	Siena	Virescit Boccaleone	Brindisi	Licata
1985–86	Lucchese	Centese	Teramo	Nocerina
1986–87	Torres	Ospitaletto	Vis Pesaro	Frosinone
1987–88	Carrarese	Mantova	Perugia	Palermo
1988–89	Casale	Chievo	Fidelis Andria	Puteolana
1989–90	Siena	Varese	Fano	Battipagliese
1990–91	Alessandria	Palazzolo	Chieti	Ischia

=== Seasons from 1991–92 to 2007–08 ===
Season	Group A Winner	Group B Winner	Group C Winner
1991–92	Ravenna	Vis Pesaro	Potenza
1992–93	Mantova	Pistoiese	Juve Stabia
1993–94	Crevalcore	Gualdo	Trapani
1994–95	Brescello	Montevarchi	Nocerina
1995–96	Novara	Treviso	Avezzano
1996–97	Lumezzane	Ternana	Battipagliese
1997–98	Varese	SPAL	Marsala
1998–99	Pisa	Viterbese	Catania
1999–2000	Spezia	Torres	Messina
2000–01	Padova	Lanciano	Taranto
2001–02	Prato	Teramo	Martina
2002–03	Pavia	Florentia Viola	Foggia
2003–04	Mantova	Grosseto	Frosinone
2004–05	Pro Sesto	Massese	Manfredonia
2005–06	Venezia	Cavese	Gallipoli
2006–07	Legnano	Foligno	Sorrento
2007–08	Pergocrema	Reggiana	Benevento

=== Lega Pro Seconda Divisione ===
==== Seasons from 2008–09 to 2010–11 ====
Season	Group A Winner	Group A Playoff Winner	Group B Winner	Group B Playoff Winner	Group C Winner	Group C Playoff Winner
2008–09	Varese	Como	Figline	Giulianova	Cosenza	Pescina V.d.G.
2009–10	Südtirol	Spezia	Lucchese	Gubbio	Juve Stabia	Cisco Roma
2010–11	Tritium	FeralpiSalò	Carpi	Carrarese	Latina	Trapani

==== Seasons from 2011–12 to 2013–14 season ====
Season	Group A Winner	Group A Playoff Winner	Group B Winner	Group B Playoff Winner
2011–12	Treviso	Cuneo	Perugia	Paganese
2012–13	Pro Patria	Venezia	Salernitana	L'Aquila
2013–14	Bassano Virtus	Alessandria	Messina	Casertana

== See also ==
- Italian football league system
