= 2008–09 Lega Pro Seconda Divisione =

Italian football league season

Geographical distribution of 2008-09 Lega Pro Seconda Divisione teams. Girone A teams are depicted with red dots, Girone B with green, and Girone C with yellow ones.

The 2008–09 Lega Pro Seconda Divisione season was the thirty-first football league season of Italian Lega Pro Seconda Divisione since its establishment in 1978, and the first since the renaming from Serie C2 to Lega Pro.

It was divided into two phases: the regular season, played from September 2008 to May 2009, and the playoff phase from May to June 2009.

It was composed of 54 teams divided into three divisions of 18 teams each, whose teams were divided geographically. Teams only played other teams in their own division, once at home and once away for a total of 34 matches each.

Teams finishing first in the regular season, plus one team winning the playoff round from each division were promoted to Lega Pro Prima Divisione; teams finishing last in the regular season, plus two relegation playoff losers from each division were relegated to Serie D. In all, six teams were promoted to Lega Pro Prima Divisione, and nine teams were relegated to Serie D.

== Events ==
=== Start of season ===
The league was to feature six teams relegated from Serie C1 in 2007–08; Lecco, Manfredonia, Pro Patria, Lanciano, Martina, and Sangiovannese. Four vacancies were created with the re-admission of Pro Patria, Lanciano, and Lecco to Lega Pro Prima Divisione in 2008-09, and the non-admission of Martina.

It featured nine teams promoted from 2007–08 Serie D; Alessandria, Aversa Normanna, Como, Figline, Fortitudo Cosenza, Giacomense, Isola Liri, Itala San Marco, and Sangiustese.

The remaining 39 teams were to come from the group of teams that played in 2007–08 Serie C2 that were neither relegated nor promoted. Of those, Nuorese (9th in Girone A), Sassari Torres (13th in Girone A), Teramo (8th in Girone B), and Castelnuovo (15th in Girone B) were banned or failed to register, creating four more vacancies. A fifth vacancy from this group was created when SPAL, which lost in last year's promotional play-offs, was admitted to Lega Pro Prima Divisione anyway to fill a vacancy.

In all, nine vacancies were created. They were filled as follows:

- Sambonifacese - Serie D Playoff winner (Serie D/C 3rd)
- Colligiana - Serie D Playoff runner-up (Serie D/E 2nd)
- Montichiari - Serie D Playoff semi-finalist (Serie D/D - 2nd)
- Alghero - Serie D Playoff semi-finalist (Serie D/G - 4th)
- Barletta - Serie D best second-placed team in group phase of playoffs (Serie D/H - 2nd)
- Rovigo - a loser in Serie C2/B play-outs and originally destined to play in Serie D
- Andria - a loser in Serie C2/C play-outs and originally destined to play in Serie D
- Val di Sangro - a loser in Serie C2/C play-outs and originally destined to play in Serie D
- Pizzighettone - which finished last in Serie C2/A and originally destined to play in Serie D

Considering all changes, the final team list includes only 2 teams that played in Serie C1 last year, 38 teams that played in Serie C2, and 14 teams that played in Serie D.

=== Promotions ===
Two of the three division champions were playing in Serie D in 2007–08. Figline and Cosenza won direct promotion to Lega Pro Prima Divisione for the 2009–10 season by winning Girone B and Girone C respectively. The year before they had been division champions in their respective Serie D divisions, and have thus both been promoted twice in consecutive years. Varese won direct promotion by winning Girone A. Varese played in Lega Pro Seconda Divisione/C2 for three years after winning promotion from Serie D in the 2005–06 season.

== Teams ==
On August 14, 2008 the following clubs were confirmed to be competing in the division:

=== Girone A ===
| Club | City | Stadium | Capacity | 2007–08 season |
|---|---|---|---|---|
| U.S. Alessandria Calcio 1912 | Alessandria | Stadio Giuseppe Moccagatta | 8,182 | 1st in Serie D/A |
| Pol. Alghero | Alghero | Stadio Mariotti | 5,000 | 4th in Serie D/G |
| F.C. Canavese | San Giusto Canavese | Stadio Franco Cerutti | 1,200 | 6th in Serie C2/A |
| A.C. Carpenedolo | Carpenedolo | Stadio Mundial '82 | 2,500 | 2nd in Serie C2/A |
| Calcio Como | Como | Stadio Giuseppe Sinigaglia | 13,602 | 1st Serie D/B |
| U.S. Itala San Marco | Gradisca d'Isonzo | Stadio Gino Colaussi | 4,000 | 1st Serie D/C |
| U.S. Ivrea Calcio | Ivrea | Stadio Gino Pistoni | 3,500 | 8th in Serie C2/A |
| A.C. Mezzocorona | Mezzocorona (playing in Trento) | Stadio Briamasco | 4,227 | 5th in Serie C2/A |
| A.C. Montichiari | Montichiari | Stadio Romeo Menti | 2,500 | 2nd in Serie D/D |
| Olbia Calcio | Olbia | Stadio Bruno Nespoli | 8,000 | 10th in Serie C2/A |
| A.C. Pavia | Pavia | Stadio Pietro Fortunati | 6,000 | 15th in Serie C2/A |
| A.S. Pizzighettone | Pizzighettone | Stadio Comunale | 2,500 | 18th in Serie C2/A |
| U.S. Pro Vercelli Calcio | Vercelli | Stadio Silvio Piola | 6,165 | 7th in Serie C2/A |
| A.C. Rodengo Saiano | Rodengo-Saiano | Stadio Comunale | 2,500 | 3rd in Serie C2/A |
| A.C. Sambonifacese | San Bonifacio | Stadio Renzo Tizian | 1,450 | 3rd in Serie D/C |
| F.C. Südtirol | Bolzano | Stadio Marco Druso | 3,000 | 12th in Serie C2/A |
| Valenzana Calcio | Valenza | Stadio Comunale | 2,200 | 17th in Serie C2/A |
| A.S. Varese 1910 | Varese | Stadio Franco Ossola | 10,000 | 11th in Serie C2/A |

=== Girone B ===
| Club | City | Stadium | Capacity | 2007–08 season |
|---|---|---|---|---|
| Bassano Virtus 55 S.T. | Bassano del Grappa | Stadio Rino Mercante | 3,900 | 2nd in Serie C2/B |
| A.C. Bellaria Igea Marina | Bellaria-Igea Marina | Stadio Enrico Nanni | 2,500 | 7th in Serie C2/B |
| Carrarese Calcio | Carrara | Stadio dei Marmi | 15,000 | 13th in Serie C2/B |
| Celano F.C. Olimpia | Celano | Stadio Comunale | 3,200 | 5th in Serie C2/C |
| A.S. Cisco Calcio Roma | Rome | Stadio Flaminio | 25,000 | 9th in Serie C2/C |
| V.F. Colligiana | Colle di Val d'Elsa | Stadio Gino Manni | 3,000 | 2nd in Serie D/E |
| Cuoiopelli Cappiano R. | Santa Croce sull'Arno | Stadio Libero Masini | 3,350 | 11th in Serie C2/B |
| A.S. Figline | Figline Valdarno | Stadio Goffredo Del Buffa | 1,700 | 1st Serie D/E |
| A.C. Giacomense | Masi Torello (playing in Ferrara) | Stadio Paolo Mazza | 19,000 | 1st Serie D/D |
| Giulianova Calcio | Giulianova | Stadio Rubens Fadini | 5,625 | 12th in Serie C2/B |
| A.S. Gubbio 1910 | Gubbio | Stadio Polisportivo San Biagio | 5,000 | 10th in Serie C2/B |
| U.S. Poggibonsi | Poggibonsi | Stadio Stefano Lotti | 3,621 | 6th in Serie C2/B |
| A.C. Prato | Prato | Stadio Lungobisenzio | 6,800 | 9th in Serie C2/B |
| Rovigo Calcio | Rovigo | Stadio Francesco Gabrielli | 3,200 | 16th in Serie C2/B |
| San Marino Calcio | Serravalle, San Marino | Stadio Olimpico | 7,000 | 5th in Serie C2/B |
| A.C. Sangiovannese 1927 | San Giovanni Valdarno | Stadio Virgilio Fedini | 3,800 | 17th in Serie C1/B |
| A.C. Sangiustese | Monte San Giusto | Stadio Villa San Filippo | 1,487 | 1st Serie D/F |
| F.C. Esperia Viareggio | Viareggio | Stadio dei Pini | 4,700 | 14th in Serie C2/B |

=== Girone C ===
| Club | City | Stadium | Capacity | 2007–08 season |
|---|---|---|---|---|
| A.S. Andria BAT | Andria | Stadio degli Ulivi | 10,500 | 17th in Serie C2/C |
| S.F. Aversa Normanna | Aversa | Stadio Rinascita | 2,000 | 1st Serie D/H |
| S.S. Barletta Calcio | Barletta | Stadio Cosimo Puttilli | 5,000 | 2nd Serie D/H |
| S.S. Cassino 1927 | Cassino | Stadio Gino Salveti | 3,700 | 8th in Serie C2/C |
| F.C. Catanzaro | Catanzaro | Stadio Nicola Ceravolo | 13,619 | 10th in Serie C2/C |
| Cosenza Calcio 1914 | Cosenza | Stadio San Vito | 24,000 | 1st Serie D/I |
| Gela Calcio | Gela | Stadio Vincenzo Presti | 4,400 | 7th in Serie C2/C |
| F.C. Igea Virtus Barcellona | Barcellona Pozzo di Gotto | Stadio Carlo D'Alcontres | 5,000 | 11th in Serie C2/C |
| A.C. Isola Liri | Isola del Liri | Stadio Conte A. Mangoni | 3,400 | 1st Serie D/G |
| S.S. Manfredonia Calcio | Manfredonia | Stadio Miramare | 4,076 | 18th in Serie C1/A |
| A.S. Melfi | Melfi | Stadio Arturo Valerio | 4,500 | 13th in Serie C2/C |
| A.C. Monopoli | Monopoli | Stadio Vito Simone Veneziani | 6,880 | 6th in Serie C2/C |
| A.S. Noicattaro Calcio | Noicattaro | Stadio Comunale | 2,500 | 12th in Serie C2/C |
| A.S. Pescina Valle del Giovenco | Avezzano | Stadio dei Marsi | 4,500 | 2nd in Serie C2/C |
| S.S. Scafatese Calcio 1922 | Scafati | Stadio Comunale | 1,950 | 16th in Serie C2/C |
| Pol. Val di Sangro | Atessa | Stadio Montemarcone | 2,000 | 15th in Serie C2/C |
| U.S. Vibonese Calcio | Vibo Valentia | Stadio Luigi Razza | 4,500 | 14th in Serie C2/C |
| Vigor Lamezia | Lamezia Terme | Stadio Guido D'Ippolito | 4,000 | 4th in Serie C2/C |

== League tables ==
=== Group A ===
| Pos | Team | Pld | W | D | L | GF | GA | GD | Pts | Promotion or relegation |
|---|---|---|---|---|---|---|---|---|---|---|
| 1 | Varese (P) | 34 | 16 | 13 | 5 | 52 | 28 | +24 | 61 | Promotion to Lega Pro Prima Divisione |
| 2 | Alessandria (P) | 34 | 15 | 16 | 3 | 42 | 25 | +17 | 61 | Promotion play-off |
| 3 | Como (O, P) | 34 | 15 | 11 | 8 | 40 | 34 | +6 | 56 | Promotion after play-off |
| 4 | Rodengo Saiano | 34 | 14 | 13 | 7 | 39 | 26 | +13 | 55 | Promotion play-off |
| 5 | Olbia | 34 | 16 | 6 | 12 | 36 | 29 | +7 | 54 | Promotion play-off |
| 6 | Sambonifacese | 34 | 14 | 11 | 9 | 44 | 38 | +6 | 53 | |
| 7 | Itala San Marco | 34 | 12 | 14 | 8 | 36 | 29 | +7 | 50 | |
| 8 | Canavese | 34 | 11 | 11 | 12 | 37 | 41 | −4 | 44 | |
| 9 | Ivrea (E, R, R, R) | 34 | 11 | 10 | 13 | 37 | 39 | −2 | 43 | Phoenix in Promozione |
| 10 | Mezzocorona | 34 | 11 | 9 | 14 | 36 | 40 | −4 | 42 | |
| 11 | Pro Vercelli | 34 | 8 | 16 | 10 | 27 | 33 | −6 | 40 | |
| 12 | Pavia | 34 | 12 | 9 | 13 | 37 | 38 | −1 | 40 (Note: 5 points deducted.) | |
| 13 | Alghero | 34 | 9 | 11 | 14 | 36 | 44 | −8 | 38 | |
| 14 | Montichiari (R) | 34 | 9 | 11 | 14 | 43 | 47 | −4 | 38 | Relegation after play-off |
| 15 | Südtirol | 34 | 8 | 12 | 14 | 31 | 40 | −9 | 36 | Relegation play-off |
| 16 | Valenzana (T) | 34 | 8 | 12 | 14 | 27 | 36 | −9 | 36 | Relegation play-off |
| 17 | Carpenedolo | 34 | 7 | 12 | 15 | 29 | 41 | −12 | 33 | Relegation play-off |
| 18 | Pizzighettone (R) | 34 | 6 | 11 | 17 | 24 | 45 | −21 | 29 | Relegation to Serie D |

Updated to match(es) played on 10 May 2009. Source: Lega Calcio Professionistico
Rules for classification: 1) points; 2) goal difference; 3) number of goals scored.
(E) Eliminated; (O) Play-off winners; (P) Promoted; (R) Relegated; (T) Qualified, but not yet for the particular phase indicated

=== Group B ===
| Pos | Team | Pld | W | D | L | GF | GA | GD | Pts | Promotion or relegation |
|---|---|---|---|---|---|---|---|---|---|---|
| 1 | Figline (C, P) | 34 | 16 | 14 | 4 | 39 | 25 | +14 | 62 | Promotion to Lega Pro Prima Divisione |
| 2 | Viareggio (P) | 34 | 15 | 13 | 6 | 42 | 29 | +13 | 58 | Promotion play-off |
| 3 | Giulianova (O, P) | 34 | 15 | 13 | 6 | 36 | 24 | +12 | 58 | Promotion after play-off |
| 4 | Bassano Virtus | 34 | 14 | 13 | 7 | 47 | 36 | +11 | 55 | Promotion play-off |
| 5 | Prato | 34 | 15 | 9 | 10 | 41 | 35 | +6 | 54 | Promotion play-off |
| 6 | Cisco Roma | 34 | 14 | 9 | 11 | 37 | 30 | +7 | 50 (Note: 1 point deducted.) | |
| 7 | Gubbio | 34 | 11 | 11 | 12 | 36 | 35 | +1 | 44 | |
| 8 | Giacomense | 34 | 11 | 11 | 12 | 38 | 38 | 0 | 44 | |
| 9 | Carrarese | 34 | 10 | 13 | 11 | 34 | 33 | +1 | 43 | |
| 10 | Sangiustese | 34 | 9 | 16 | 9 | 29 | 31 | −2 | 43 | |
| 11 | Celano | 34 | 10 | 11 | 13 | 50 | 44 | +6 | 41 | |
| 12 | Sangiovannese | 34 | 10 | 10 | 14 | 34 | 38 | −4 | 40 | |
| 13 | Colligiana | 34 | 10 | 10 | 14 | 29 | 36 | −7 | 40 | |
| 14 | Cuoiocappiano (R) | 34 | 8 | 14 | 12 | 29 | 41 | −12 | 38 | Relegation after play-off |
| 15 | Poggibonsi (T) | 34 | 8 | 12 | 14 | 27 | 41 | −14 | 36 | Relegation play-off |
| 16 | San Marino | 34 | 7 | 14 | 13 | 37 | 45 | −8 | 35 | Relegation play-off |
| 17 | Bellaria Igea | 34 | 5 | 18 | 11 | 36 | 46 | −10 | 33 | Relegation play-off |
| 18 | Rovigo (R) | 34 | 5 | 15 | 14 | 29 | 43 | −14 | 30 | Relegation to Serie D |

Updated to match(es) played on 17 May 2009. Source: Lega Italiana Calcio Professionistico
Rules for classification: 1) points; 2) goal difference; 3) number of goals scored.
(C) Champions; (O) Play-off winners; (P) Promoted; (R) Relegated; (T) Qualified, but not yet for the particular phase indicated

=== Girone C ===
| Pos | Team | Pld | W | D | L | GF | GA | GD | Pts | Promotion or relegation |
|---|---|---|---|---|---|---|---|---|---|---|
| 1 | Cosenza (P) | 34 | 19 | 10 | 5 | 39 | 16 | +23 | 67 | Promotion to Lega Pro Prima Divisione |
| 2 | Gela | 34 | 17 | 13 | 4 | 42 | 23 | +19 | 64 | Promotion play-off |
| 3 | Catanzaro | 34 | 15 | 14 | 5 | 39 | 23 | +16 | 59 | Promotion play-off |
| 4 | Pescina V.d.G. (O, P) | 34 | 13 | 15 | 6 | 42 | 32 | +10 | 54 | Promotion after play-off |
| 5 | Andria BAT (P) | 34 | 15 | 7 | 12 | 33 | 28 | +5 | 52 | Promotion play-off |
| 6 | Cassino | 34 | 12 | 16 | 6 | 39 | 27 | +12 | 52 | |
| 7 | Barletta | 34 | 10 | 14 | 10 | 32 | 31 | +1 | 44 | |
| 8 | Monopoli | 34 | 9 | 16 | 9 | 42 | 36 | +6 | 43 | |
| 9 | Aversa Normanna | 34 | 10 | 12 | 12 | 32 | 33 | −1 | 42 | |
| 10 | Melfi | 34 | 9 | 14 | 11 | 39 | 41 | −2 | 41 | |
| 11 | Noicattaro | 34 | 9 | 14 | 11 | 25 | 28 | −3 | 41 | |
| 12 | Scafatese | 34 | 11 | 8 | 15 | 32 | 39 | −7 | 41 | |
| 13 | Igea Virtus | 34 | 8 | 16 | 10 | 29 | 27 | +2 | 40 | |
| 14 | Manfredonia | 34 | 10 | 11 | 13 | 25 | 32 | −7 | 40 (Note: 1 point deducted.) | Relegation play-off |
| 15 | Val di Sangro (R) | 34 | 8 | 11 | 15 | 29 | 43 | −14 | 35 | Relegation after play-off |
| 16 | Vibonese | 34 | 7 | 13 | 14 | 21 | 36 | −15 | 34 | Relegation play-off |
| 17 | Isola Liri (T) | 34 | 5 | 15 | 14 | 24 | 40 | −16 | 30 | Relegation play-off |
| 18 | Vigor Lamezia (R) | 34 | 5 | 9 | 20 | 20 | 49 | −29 | 24 | Relegation to Serie D |

Updated to match(es) played on 17 May 2009. Source: Lega Italiana Calcio Professionistico
Rules for classification: 1) points; 2) goal difference; 3) number of goals scored.
(O) Play-off winners; (P) Promoted; (R) Relegated; (T) Qualified, but not yet for the particular phase indicated

== Promotion and relegation playoffs ==
=== Girone A ===
==== Promotion ====
Promotion playoff semifinals
First legs played May 31, 2009; return legs played June 7, 2009

| Team 1 | Agg. | Team 2 | 1st leg | 2nd leg |
|---|---|---|---|---|
| Olbia (5) | 1–1 | (2) Alessandria | 1–0 | 0–1 |
| Rodengo Saiano (4) | 1–1 | (3) Como | 1–1 | 0–0 |

Promotion playoff finals
First leg played June 14, 2009; return leg played June 21, 2009

| Team 1 | Agg. | Team 2 | 1st leg | 2nd leg |
|---|---|---|---|---|
| Como (3) | 4–1 | (2) Alessandria | 2–1 | 2–0 |

Como promoted to Lega Pro Prima Divisione

==== Relegation ====
Relegation playoffs
First legs played May 31, 2009; return legs played June 7, 2009

| Team 1 | Agg. | Team 2 | 1st leg | 2nd leg |
|---|---|---|---|---|
| Carpenedolo (17) | 2–1 | (14) Montichiari | 1–0 | 1–1 |
| Valenzana (16) | 2–2 | (15) Südtirol-Alto Adige | 2–0 | 0–2 |

Montichiari and Valenzana relegated to Serie D

=== Girone B ===
==== Promotion ====
Promotion playoff semifinals
First legs played May 31, 2009; return legs played June 7, 2009

| Team 1 | Agg. | Team 2 | 1st leg | 2nd leg |
|---|---|---|---|---|
| Prato (5) | 3–2 | (2) Viareggio | 2–0 | 1–2 |
| Bassano (4) | 1–2 | (3) Giulianova | 1–1 | 0–1 |

Promotion playoff finals
First leg played June 14, 2009; return leg played June 21, 2009

| Team 1 | Agg. | Team 2 | 1st leg | 2nd leg |
|---|---|---|---|---|
| Prato (5) | 1–1(aet) | (3) Giulianova | 0–1 | 1–0 |

Giulianova promoted to Lega Pro Prima Divisione

==== Relegation ====
Relegation playoffs
First legs played May 31, 2009; return legs played June 7, 2009

| Team 1 | Agg. | Team 2 | 1st leg | 2nd leg |
|---|---|---|---|---|
| Bellaria Igea (17) | 4–2 | (14) Cuoiocappiano | 3–2 | 1–0 |
| San Marino (16) | 3–2 | (15) Poggibonsi | 3–1 | 0–1 |

Cuoiocappiano and Poggibonsi relegated to Serie D

=== Girone C ===
==== Promotion ====
Promotion playoff semifinals
First legs played May 31, 2009; return legs played June 7, 2009

| Team 1 | Agg. | Team 2 | 1st leg | 2nd leg |
|---|---|---|---|---|
| Andria BAT (5) | 1–1 | (2) Gela | 0–0 | 1–1 |
| Pescina V.d.G. (4) | 3–2 | (3) Catanzaro | 0–0 | 3–2 |

Promotion playoff finals
First leg played June 14, 2009; return leg played June 21, 2009

| Team 1 | Agg. | Team 2 | 1st leg | 2nd leg |
|---|---|---|---|---|
| Pescina V.d.G. (4) | 2–1 | (2) Gela | 1–0 | 1–1 |

Pescina V.d.G. promoted to Lega Pro Prima Divisione

==== Relegation ====
Relegation playoffs
First legs played May 31, 2009; return legs played June 7, 2009

| Team 1 | Agg. | Team 2 | 1st leg | 2nd leg |
|---|---|---|---|---|
| Isola Liri (17) | 0–5 | (14) Manfredonia | 0–3 | 0–2 |
| Vibonese (16) | 3–1 | (15) Val di Sangro | 1–0 | 2–1 |

Isola Liri and Val di Sangro relegated to Serie D
