= 2009–10 Lega Pro Seconda Divisione =

Geographical distribution of 2009-10 Lega Pro Seconda Divisione teams. Girone A teams are depicted with red dots, Girone B with green, and Girone C with yellow ones.

The 2009–10 Lega Pro Seconda Divisione season was the thirty-second football league season of Italian Lega Pro Seconda Divisione since its establishment in 1978, and the second since the renaming from Serie C to Lega Pro.

It was divided into two phases: the regular season, played from September 2009 to May 2010, and the playoff phase from May to June 2010.

The league was composed of 54 teams divided into three divisions of 18 teams each, whose teams were divided geographically. Teams played only other teams in their own division, once at home and once away for a total of 34 matches each.

Teams that finished first in the regular season, plus one team winning the playoff round from each division were promoted to Lega Pro Prima Divisione; teams that finished last in the regular season, plus two relegation playoff losers from each division were relegated to Serie D. In all, six teams were promoted to Prima Divisione, and nine teams were relegated to Serie D.

== Events ==
=== Start of season ===
On July 9, the Covisoc (Commissione di Vigilanza sulle Società Calcistiche, Vigilancy Commission on Football Clubs) organization announced that 11 Seconda Divisione clubs did not pass the financial requirements in order to be admitted to the league. The clubs were allowed to appeal the decision until July 11. Seven were eventually saved. Of the remaining four, two did not bother to file submissions even before the review started, one did not appeal Covisoc's decision, while the fourth team lost on appeal.

The league was to feature six teams relegated from 2008–09 Lega Pro Prima Divisione: Pro Sesto, Sambenedettese, Legnano, Pistoiese, Juve Stabia, and Potenza. Three vacancies were created from this group. Two teams were excluded from the 2009–10 season as they did not pass the financial requirements: Sambenedettese did not appeal the commission's decision, while Pistoiese lost on appeal. On July 30, Potenza was called up to Prima Divisione to fill a vacancy.

It was to feature nine teams promoted from 2008–09 Serie D as division winners: Biellese (that did not file any registration papers, and thus, was excluded from the league and replaced by Spezia) - Girone A, P.B. Vercelli - Girone B, Sacilese - Girone C, Crociati Noceto - Girone D, Sporting Lucchese - Girone E, Pro Vasto - Girone F, Villacidrese - Girone G, Brindisi - Girone H, and Siracusa - Girone I.

The remaining 39 teams were to come from the group of teams that played in 2008–09 Lega Pro Seconda Divisione that were neither relegated nor promoted. Another four vacancies were created from this group. Ivrea (9th in Girone A) failed to register for the upcoming season. Alessandria - 2nd in Girone A, Andria - 5th in Girone C, and Viareggio - 2nd in Girone B - all promotional playoff losers in the Second Divisione 2008–09 season were called up to Prima Divisione anyway to fill vacancies.

The eight vacancies were successively filled as follows:

- Spezia - 2nd in 2008–09 Serie D - Girone A, replacing first place Biellese
- Nocerina - 2nd in 2008–09 Serie D - Girone H, winner of the playoffs
- Vico Equense - 2nd in 2008–09 Serie D - Girone I, finalist in the playoffs
- Fano - 2nd in 2008–09 Serie D - Girone F, selected by the league
- FeralpiSalò - 4th in 2008–09 Serie D(as A.C. Salò) - Girone D, selected by the league
- Valenzana - 16th in 2008–09 Lega Pro Seconda Divisione - Girone A, originally relegated for losing in the playouts.
- Poggibonsi - 15th in 2008–09 Lega Pro Seconda Divisione - Girone B, originally relegated for losing in the playouts.
- Isola Liri - 17th in 2008–09 Lega Pro Seconda Divisione - Girone C, originally relegated for losing in the playouts.

== Teams ==
=== Girone A ===
Club	City	Stadium	Capacity	2008–09 season
Pol. Alghero	Alghero	Stadio Mariotti	5,000	13th in Lega Pro Seconda Divisione A
F.C. Canavese	San Giusto Canavese	Stadio Franco Cerutti	2,510	8th in Lega Pro Seconda Divisione A
A.C. Carpenedolo	Carpenedolo	Stadio Mundial '82	2,500	17th in Lega Pro Seconda Divisione A
Crociati Noceto	Noceto	Stadio Il Noce	1,000	1st in Serie D/D
FeralpiSalò	Salò and Lonato del Garda (playing in Salò)	Lino Turina	2,000	4th in Serie D/D (as A.C. Salò)
A.C. Legnano	Legnano	Stadio Giovanni Mari	6,600	18th in Lega Pro Prima Divisione A
A.C. Mezzocorona	Mezzocorona (playing in Trento)	Stadio Briamasco	4,227	10th in Lega Pro Seconda Divisione A
Olbia Calcio	Olbia	Stadio Bruno Nespoli	8,000	5th in Lega Pro Seconda Divisione A
A.C. Pavia	Pavia	Stadio Pietro Fortunati	3,999	12th in Lega Pro Seconda Divisione A
A.S. Pro Belvedere Vercelli	Vercelli	Stadio Silvio Piola	6,165	1st in Serie D/B
A.C. Pro Sesto	Sesto San Giovanni	Stadio Breda	4,500	14th in Lega Pro Prima Divisione A
U.S. Pro Vercelli Calcio	Vercelli	Stadio Silvio Piola	6,165	11th in Lega Pro Seconda Divisione A
A.C. Rodengo Saiano	Rodengo-Saiano	Stadio Comunale	2,500	4th in Lega Pro Seconda Divisione A
A.C. Sambonifacese	San Bonifacio	Stadio Renzo Tizian	1,450	6th in Lega Pro Seconda Divisione A
Spezia Calcio	La Spezia	Stadio Alberto Picco	10,336	2nd in Serie D/A
F.C. Südtirol	Brixen (playing in Bolzano)	Stadio Marco Druso	3,000	15th in Lega Pro Seconda Divisione A
Valenzana Calcio	Valenza	Stadio Comunale	2,200	17th in Lega Pro Seconda Divisione A
S.S. Villacidrese Calcio	Villacidro	Stadio Comunale	2,000	1st in Serie D/G

=== Girone B ===
Club	City	Stadium	Capacity	2008–09 season
Bassano Virtus 55 S.T.	Bassano del Grappa	Stadio Rino Mercante	3,900	4th in Lega Pro Seconda Divisione B
A.C. Bellaria Igea Marina	Bellaria-Igea Marina	Stadio Enrico Nanni	2,500	17th in Lega Pro Seconda Divisione B
Carrarese Calcio	Carrara	Stadio dei Marmi	15,000	9th in Lega Pro Seconda Divisione B
Celano F.C. Olimpia	Celano	Stadio Comunale	3,200	11th in Lega Pro Seconda Divisione B
V.F. Colligiana	Colle di Val d'Elsa	Stadio Gino Manni	3,000	13th in Lega Pro Seconda Divisione B
Fano Calcio	Fano	Stadio Raffaele Mancini	4,500	2nd in Serie D/F
A.C. Giacomense	Masi Torello (playing in Ferrara)	Stadio Paolo Mazza	7,000	8th in Lega Pro Seconda Divisione B
A.S. Gubbio 1910	Gubbio	Stadio San Biagio	5,000	7th in Lega Pro Seconda Divisione B
U.S. Itala San Marco	Gradisca d'Isonzo	Stadio Gino Colaussi	4,000	7th in Lega Pro Seconda Divisione A
A.S. Lucchese Libertas 1905	Lucca	Stadio Porta Elisa	7,400	1st in Serie D/E
A.S.G. Nocerina	Nocera Inferiore	Stadio San Francesco	9,000	2nd in Serie D/H
U.S. Poggibonsi	Poggibonsi	Stadio Stefano Lotti	3,621	15th in Lega Pro Seconda Divisione B
A.C. Prato	Prato	Stadio Lungobisenzio	6,800	5th in Lega Pro Seconda Divisione B
F.C. Pro Vasto	Vasto	Stadio Aragona	5,200	1st in Serie D/F
S.S. Sacilese Calcio	Sacile	Stadio XXV Aprile - Aldo Castenetto	2,600	1st in Serie D/C
San Marino Calcio	Serravalle, San Marino	Stadio Olimpico	7,000	16th in Lega Pro Seconda Divisione B
A.C. Sangiovannese 1927	San Giovanni Valdarno	Stadio Virgilio Fedini	3,800	12th in Lega Pro Seconda Divisione B
A.C. Sangiustese	Monte San Giusto	Stadio Villa San Filippo	1,200	10th in Lega Pro Seconda Divisione B

=== Girone C ===
Club	City	Stadium	Capacity	2008–09 season
S.F. Aversa Normanna	Aversa	Stadio Rinascita	2,000	9th in Lega Pro Seconda Divisione C
S.S. Barletta Calcio	Barletta	Stadio Cosimo Puttilli	5,000	7th in Lega Pro Seconda Divisione C
F.B. Brindisi 1912	Brindisi	Stadio Franco Fanuzzi	7,600	1st in Serie D/H
S.S. Cassino 1927	Cassino	Stadio Gino Salveti	3,700	6th in Lega Pro Seconda Divisione C
F.C. Catanzaro	Catanzaro	Stadio Nicola Ceravolo	13,619	3rd in Lega Pro Seconda Divisione C
A.S. Cisco Calcio Roma	Rome	Stadio Flaminio	25,000	6th in Lega Pro Seconda Divisione B
Gela Calcio	Gela	Stadio Vincenzo Presti	4,400	2nd in Lega Pro Seconda Divisione C
F.C. Igea Virtus Barcellona	Barcellona Pozzo di Gotto	Stadio Carlo D'Alcontres	5,000	13th in Lega Pro Seconda Divisione C
A.C. Isola Liri	Isola del Liri	Stadio Conte A. Mangoni	3,400	17th in Lega Pro Seconda Divisione C
S.S. Juve Stabia	Castellammare di Stabia	Stadio Romeo Menti	10,400	17th in Lega Pro Prima Divisione B
S.S. Manfredonia Calcio	Manfredonia	Stadio Miramare	4,076	14th in Lega Pro Seconda Divisione C
A.S. Melfi	Melfi	Stadio Arturo Valerio	4,500	10th in Lega Pro Seconda Divisione C
A.C. Monopoli	Monopoli	Stadio Vito Simone Veneziani	6,880	8th in Lega Pro Seconda Divisione C
A.S. Noicattaro Calcio	Noicattaro	Stadio Comunale	2,500	11th in Lega Pro Seconda Divisione C
S.S. Scafatese Calcio 1922	Scafati	Stadio Comunale	1,950	12th in Lega Pro Seconda Divisione C
U.S. Siracusa	Syracuse	Stadio Nicola De Simone	6,200	1st in Serie D/I
U.S. Vibonese Calcio	Vibo Valentia	Stadio Luigi Razza	4,500	16th in Lega Pro Seconda Divisione C
Vico Equense Calcio 1958	Vico Equense	Stadio Comunale	1,000	2nd in Serie D/I

== League table ==
=== Girone A ===
Pos	Team	Pld	W	D	L	GF	GA	GD	Pts	Promotion or relegation
1	Südtirol (C, P)	34	18	9	7	33	23	+10	63	Promotion to Lega Pro Prima Divisione
2	Spezia (P)	34	16	12	6	47	27	+20	60	Promotion to Lega Pro Prima Divisione
3	Legnano (R)	34	16	11	7	49	31	+18	57 (Note: LEG: 10 pts ; FER: 4 pts ; PAV: 2 pts) (Note: 2 point deduction.)	Excluded from professional football after bankruptcy (Note: Legnano and Alghero declared bankrupt and folded at the end of the season.)
4	FeralpiSalò	34	14	15	5	41	32	+9	57	Qualification for Promotion play-off
5	Pavia (P)	34	15	12	7	49	32	+17	57	Promotion to Lega Pro Prima Divisione (Note: Pavia promoted to the Lega Pro Prima Divisione to fill the vacancies created.)
6	Alghero (R)	34	15	12	7	43	25	+18	56 (Note: 1 point deduction due to financial irregularities.)	Excluded from professional football after bankruptcy
7	Rodengo Saiano	34	12	14	8	40	32	+8	49	
8	Crociati Noceto	34	9	15	10	36	37	−1	42 (Note: CRO 2-0 OLB ; OLB 2-1 CRO)	
9	Olbia (R)	34	8	18	8	32	27	+5	42	Relegation to Eccellenza (Note: Olbia declared bankrupt and will restart from Eccellenza as Olbia 1905.)
10	Valenzana	34	9	14	11	24	29	−5	41 (Note: VAL: 9 pts ; SAM: 6 pts ; PRO: 3 pts)	
11	Sambonifacese	34	10	12	12	44	46	−2	41	
12	Pro Vercelli (R)	34	11	8	15	31	37	−6	41	Excluded from professional football after bankruptcy (Note: Pro Vercelli was excluded by Federal Council's decision.)
13	Canavese	34	9	13	12	31	39	−8	40	
14	Mezzocorona	34	11	6	17	42	46	−4	39 (Note: MEZ 2-1 VIL ; VIL 1-0 MEZ)	Qualification for Relegation play-off
15	Villacidrese	34	10	9	15	38	43	−5	39	Qualification for Relegation play-off
16	Carpenedolo (R)	34	9	8	17	34	50	−16	35	Relegation to Serie D
17	P.B. Vercelli	34	5	13	16	15	39	−24	28	Relegation to Serie D (Note: P.B. Vercelli reprieved from relegation to fill the vacancies created in 2009–10 Lega Pro Seconda Divisione. Later changed its name to F.B. Pro Vercelli 1892, after the historical team was excluded from the league, under the name U.S. Pro Vercelli Calcio.)
18	Pro Sesto (R)	34	5	7	22	24	58	−34	20	Relegation to Promozione (Note: Pro Sesto declared bankrupt and entered in 2010-11 Promozione as Nuova Pro Sesto.)

Updated to match(es) played on 16 May 2010. Source: http://www.gazzetta.it/speciali/risultati_classifiche/2010/calcio/serieb/index.shtml
Rules for classification: 1) points; 2) goal difference; 3) number of goals scored.
(C) Champions; (P) Promoted; (R) Relegated

=== Girone B ===
Pos	Team	Pld	W	D	L	GF	GA	GD	Pts	Promotion or relegation
1	Lucchese (C, P)	34	19	11	4	58	34	+24	68	Promotion to Lega Pro Prima Divisione
2	San Marino	34	15	11	8	58	41	+17	56	Qualification for Promotion play-off
3	Gubbio (P)	34	15	10	9	40	27	+13	55 (Note: GUB 2-1 FAN; FAN 1-0 GUB)	Promotion to Lega Pro Prima Divisione
4	Fano	34	14	13	7	36	24	+12	55	Qualification for Promotion play-off
5	Sangiovannese	34	13	15	6	42	33	+9	54	Qualification for Promotion play-off
6	Prato	34	14	10	10	50	37	+13	52	
7	Bassano Virtus (P)	34	12	15	7	48	35	+13	51	Promotion to Lega Pro Prima Divisione (Note: Bassano Virtus and Nocerina promoted to the Lega Pro Prima D Divisione to fill the vacancies created.)
8	Sangiustese (R)	34	12	7	15	34	43	−9	43	Relegation to Eccellenza (Note: Sangiustese was excluded by a decision of the Federal Council and will start from Eccellenza.)
9	Itala San Marco (R)	34	10	12	12	42	45	−3	42	Relegation to Eccellenza (Note: Itala San Marco was excluded by a decision of the Federal Council and will start from Eccellenza as I.S.M. Gradisca.)
10	Celano	34	10	11	13	35	42	−7	41	
11	Sacilese	34	9	13	12	35	39	−4	40 (Note: SAC 3-1 PRO; PRO 0-1 SAC)	
12	Pro Vasto (R)	34	9	13	12	38	47	−9	40	Excluded from italian football after does not join the championship (Note: Pro Vasto declared bankrupt and folded at end of season.)
13	Nocerina (P)	34	8	14	12	37	37	0	38	Promotion to Lega Pro Prima Divisione
14	Giacomense	34	9	10	15	31	45	−14	37	Qualification for Relegation play-off
15	Poggibonsi	34	8	12	14	36	50	−14	36	Qualification for Relegation play-off
16	Bellaria Igea	34	8	11	15	27	40	−13	35	Relegation to Serie D (Note: Bellaria Igea and Carrarese reprieved from relegation to fill the vacancies created in 2009–10 Lega Pro Seconda Divisione.)
17	Colligiana (R)	34	8	11	15	32	43	−11	34 (Note: 1 point deduction due to financial irregularities.)	Relegation to Terza Categoria (Note: Colligiana declared bankrupt, and will start as Colle Giovane from Terza Categoria, the last level of Italian football.)
18	Carrarese	34	7	12	15	37	57	−20	33	Relegation to Serie D

Updated to match(es) played on 16 May 2010. Source: http://www.gazzetta.it/speciali/risultati_classifiche/2010/calcio/serie-c2/gironeb/index.shtml
Rules for classification: 1) points; 2) goal difference; 3) number of goals scored.
(C) Champions; (P) Promoted; (R) Relegated

=== Girone C ===
Pos	Team	Pld	W	D	L	GF	GA	GD	Pts	Promotion or relegation
1	Juve Stabia (C, P)	34	22	7	5	65	28	+37	73	Promotion to Lega Pro Prima Divisione
2	Catanzaro	34	22	6	6	61	29	+32	69 (Note: 3 point deduction due to financial irregularities.)	Qualification for Promotion play-off
3	Cisco Roma (P)	34	19	11	4	52	23	+29	68	Promotion to Lega Pro Prima Divisione
4	Brindisi	34	16	9	9	55	35	+20	57	Qualification for Promotion play-off
5	Barletta (P)	34	15	12	7	35	31	+4	56 (Note: 1 point deduction due to financial irregularities.)	Promotion to Lega Pro Prima Divisione (Note: Barletta, Siracusa and Gela promoted to the Lega Pro Prima Divisione to fill the vacancies created.)
6	Siracusa (P)	34	16	6	12	40	29	+11	54	Promotion to Lega Pro Prima Divisione
7	Gela (P)	34	13	10	11	34	26	+8	49	Promotion to Lega Pro Prima Divisione
8	Cassino (R)	34	14	6	14	40	43	−3	48	Relegation to Promozione (Note: Cassino excluded by Federal Council's decision, registered for Promozione as Nuova Cassino 1924.)
9	Melfi	34	13	8	13	48	42	+6	47	
10	Monopoli (R)	34	11	10	13	38	41	−3	43	Relegation to Terza Categoria (Note: Monopoli declared bankrupt and will start from Terza Categoria.)
11	Aversa Normanna	34	10	12	12	34	37	−3	42 (Note: MAN 2–1 AVE; AVE 1-0 MAN)	
12	Manfredonia (R)	34	11	9	14	33	42	−9	42	Relegation to Eccellenza (Note: Manfrdonia not given a Lega Pro Seconda Divisione licence for 2010-11 and will start from Eccellenza as Manfredonia Football 1932.)
13	Scafatese (R)	34	9	14	11	35	37	−2	41	Relegation to Terza Categoria (Note: Scafatese declared bankrupt and will start from Terza Categoria.)
14	Isola Liri	34	9	8	17	23	44	−21	35	Qualification for Relegation play-off
15	Noicattaro (R)	34	8	10	16	30	50	−20	34	Excluded from italian football after does not join the championship (Note: Noicattaro declared bankrupt and folded at end of season.)
16	Vibonese	34	7	11	16	27	47	−20	31	Qualification for Relegation play-off
17	Vico Equense (R)	34	5	11	18	21	37	−16	26	Relegation to Prima Categoria (Note: Vico Equense does not join the championship and will start from Prima Categoria.)
18	Igea Virtus (R)	34	1	10	23	24	74	−50	8 (Note: For Igea Virtus 5 point deduction due to financial irregularities.)	Excluded from italian football after does not join the championship (Note: Igea Virtus declared bankrupt and folded at end of season.)

Updated to match(es) played on 9 May 2010. Source: http://www.gazzetta.it/speciali/risultati_classifiche/2010/calcio/serie-c2/gironec/index.shtml
Rules for classification: 1) points; 2) goal difference; 3) number of goals scored.
(C) Champions; (P) Promoted; (R) Relegated

== Promotion Playoffs ==
=== Girone A ===
Semifinals
First legs played May 23, 2010; return legs played May 30, 2010

Team 1	Agg.	Team 2	1st leg	2nd leg
Pavia (5)	0-2	(2) Spezia	0–1	0–1
FeralpiSalò (4)	1-2	(3) Legnano	1–2	0-0

Final
First leg played June 6, 2010; return leg played June 13, 2010

Team 1	Agg.	Team 2	1st leg	2nd leg
Legnano (3)	2–3	(2) Spezia	2-1	0-2

Spezia promoted to Lega Pro Prima Divisione.

=== Girone B ===
Semifinals
First legs played May 23, 2010; return legs played May 30, 2010

Team 1	Agg.	Team 2	1st leg	2nd leg
Sangiovannese (5)	2-3	(2) San Marino	1-0	1–3
Fano (4)	2-4	(3) Gubbio	1–2	1-2

Final
First leg played June 6, 2010; return leg played June 13, 2010

Team 1	Agg.	Team 2	1st leg	2nd leg
(3) Gubbio	4-0	(2) San Marino	2-0	2-0

Gubbio promoted to Lega Pro Prima Divisione.

=== Girone C ===
Semifinals
First legs played May 23, 2010; return legs played May 30, 2010

Team 1	Agg.	Team 2	1st leg	2nd leg
Barletta (5)	0-2	(2) Catanzaro	0-1	0-1
Brindisi (4)	0-0 (hc)	(3) Cisco Roma	0-0	0-0

hc - higher classified team wins

Final
First leg played June 6, 2010; return leg played June 13, 2010

Team 1	Agg.	Team 2	1st leg	2nd leg
(3) Cisco Roma	6-4	(2) Catanzaro	4-0	2-4

Cisco Roma promoted to Lega Pro Prima Divisione.

== Relegation Playoffs ==
=== Girone A ===
First legs played May 23, 2010; return legs played May 30, 2010

Team 1	Agg.	Team 2	1st leg	2nd leg
P.B. Vercelli (17)	3–3 (hc)	(14) Mezzocorona	1–3	2–0
Carpenedolo (16)	2–3	(15) Villacidrese	2–2	0–1

hc - higher classified team wins

P.B. Vercelli and Carpenedolo relegated to Serie D.

=== Girone B ===
First legs played May 23, 2010; return legs played May 30, 2010

Team 1	Agg.	Team 2	1st leg	2nd leg
Colligiana (17)	2–2 (hc)	(14) Giacomense	1–1	1–1
Bellaria Igea (16)	0–1	(15) Poggibonsi	0–1	0–0

hc - higher classified team wins

Colligiana and Bellaria Igea relegated to Serie D.

=== Girone C ===
First legs played May 23, 2010; return legs played May 30, 2010

Team 1	Agg.	Team 2	1st leg	2nd leg
Vico Equense (17)	2–2 (hc)	(14) Isola Liri	2–0	0–2
Vibonese (16)	3–1	(15) Noicattaro	3–0	0–1

hc - higher classified team wins

Vico Equense and Noicattaro relegated to Serie D.
