= 2007–08 Serie C2 =

Italian football league season

Geographical distribution of 2007-08 Serie C2 teams. Serie C2/A teams are depicted with red dots, Serie C2/B with green, and Serie C2/C with yellow ones.

The 2007–08 Serie C2 season was the thirtieth football (soccer) league season of Italian Serie C2 since its establishment in 1978 . It was divided into two phases: the regular season, played from September 2007 to May 2008, and the playoff phase from May to June 2008.

The league was composed of 54 teams divided into three divisions of 18 teams each, whose teams will be divided geographically.

Teams finishing first in the regular season, plus one team winning the playoff round from each division were promoted to Serie C1; teams finishing last in the regular season, plus two relegation playoff losers from each division were relegated to Serie D. In all, six teams were promoted to Serie C1, and nine teams were relegated to Serie D.

== Events ==
The line-up was announced on July 19, 2007. The only team excluded because of financial troubles was Tempio, Serie D - Girone B winners in 2006–07. On August 3, 2007 it was announced that the vacancy would be filled by Serie D - Girone B runners-up U.S. Calcio Caravaggese (formerly USO Calcio Caravaggio).

The league features six teams relegated from Serie C1 in 2006–07 (Pizzighettone, Ivrea, Pavia, Teramo, San Marino and Giulianova) and nine promoted from Serie D (Canavese, Mezzocorona, Rodengo Saiano, Esperia Viareggio, Valle del Giovenco, Scafatese, Noicattaro, Neapolis and Calcio Caravaggese).

== Standings ==
=== Serie C2/A ===
Final standings

Pos	Team	Pld	W	D	L	GF	GA	GD	Pts	Promotion or relegation
1	Pergocrema (C, P)	34	14	15	5	38	22	+16	57	Promoted to Serie C1
2	Carpenedolo	34	16	9	9	49	39	+10	57	Lost in Promotion playoffs
3	Rodengo Saiano	34	13	13	8	42	31	+11	52	Lost in Promotion playoffs
4	Lumezzane (P)	34	15	7	12	48	46	+2	52	Promoted to Serie C1
5	Mezzocorona	34	14	9	11	36	31	+5	51	Lost in Promotion playoffs
6	Canavese	34	12	12	10	38	39	−1	48	
7	Pro Vercelli	34	12	11	11	43	43	0	47	
8	Ivrea	34	11	13	10	48	44	+4	46	
9	Nuorese	34	11	12	11	40	40	0	45	
10	Olbia	34	13	8	13	44	48	−4	45 (Note: 2 points deduction)	
11	Varese	34	10	14	10	36	33	+3	44	
12	Südtirol	34	10	14	10	34	33	+1	44	
13	Sassari Torres	34	13	11	10	42	34	+8	42 (Note: 8 points deduction)	
14	Cuneo (R)	34	10	12	12	42	43	−1	42	Lost relegation playoffs
15	Pavia	34	10	12	12	40	49	−9	42	Won relegation playoffs
16	Calcio Caravaggese (R)	34	7	13	14	30	39	−9	34	Lost relegation playoffs
17	Valenzana	34	8	9	17	28	44	−16	33	Won relegation playoffs
18	Pizzighettone (R)	34	6	8	20	36	56	−20	26	Direct relegation to Serie D

(C) Champions; (P) Promoted; (R) Relegated

=== Serie C2/B ===
Final standings

Pos	Team	Pld	W	D	L	GF	GA	GD	Pts	Promotion or relegation
1	Reggiana (C, P)	34	19	13	2	57	27	+30	70	Direct promotion to Serie C1
2	Bassano Virtus	34	19	9	6	60	34	+26	66	Lost in Promotion playoffs
3	Portosummaga (P)	34	18	7	9	57	34	+23	61	Promoted to Serie C1
4	SPAL	34	14	12	8	49	37	+12	54	Lost in Promotion playoffs
5	San Marino	34	13	11	10	44	37	+7	50	Lost in Promotion playoffs
6	Poggibonsi	34	12	11	11	34	38	−4	47	
7	Bellaria Igea	34	9	18	7	38	34	+4	45	
8	Teramo	34	11	13	10	37	41	−4	44 (Note: 2 points deducted)	
9	Prato	34	10	14	10	35	43	−8	44	
10	Gubbio	34	11	10	13	42	37	+5	43	
11	Cuoiocappiano	34	10	13	11	34	33	+1	42 (Note: 1 point deducted)	
12	Giulianova	34	9	15	10	28	32	−4	42	
13	Carrarese	34	12	6	16	37	42	−5	42	
14	Viareggio	34	10	9	15	30	36	−6	39	Won relegation playoffs
15	Castelnuovo	34	9	14	11	35	35	0	37 (Note: 4 points deducted)	Won relegation playoffs
16	Rovigo (R)	34	9	9	16	42	56	−14	36	Lost relegation playoffs
17	Viterbese (R)	34	6	10	18	28	54	−26	25 (Note: 3 points deducted)	Lost relegation playoffs
18	Sansovino (R)	34	3	10	21	25	62	−37	19	Direct relegation to Serie D

(C) Champions; (P) Promoted; (R) Relegated

=== Serie C2/C ===
Final standings

Pos	Team	Pld	W	D	L	GF	GA	GD	Pts	Promotion or relegation
1	Benevento (C, P)	34	20	8	6	51	21	+30	68	Direct promotion to Serie C1
2	Pescina V.d.G.	34	17	8	9	40	31	+9	59	Lost in Promotion playoffs
3	Real Marcianise (P)	34	16	7	11	48	40	+8	55	Promoted to Serie C1
4	Vigor Lamezia	34	13	14	7	35	26	+9	53	Lost in Promotion playoffs
5	Celano	34	15	8	11	38	36	+2	53	Lost in Promotion playoffs
6	Monopoli	34	13	11	10	46	35	+11	50	
7	Gela	34	13	7	14	38	39	−1	46	
8	Cassino	34	12	9	13	30	38	−8	45	
9	Cisco Roma	34	11	11	12	33	35	−2	44	
10	Catanzaro	34	10	15	9	32	25	+7	43 (Note: 2 points deducted)	
11	Igea Virtus	34	11	10	13	32	33	−1	43	
12	Noicattaro	34	11	10	13	42	45	−3	43	
13	Melfi	34	12	8	14	37	42	−5	43 (Note: 1 point deducted)	
14	Vibonese	34	10	12	12	26	30	−4	42	Won relegation playoffs
15	Val di Sangro (R)	34	9	9	16	36	42	−6	36	Lost relegation playoffs
16	Scafatese	34	8	11	15	27	40	−13	35	Won relegation playoffs
17	Andria (R)	34	7	13	14	35	47	−12	34	Lost relegation playoffs
18	Neapolis (R)	34	8	9	17	36	57	−21	33	Direct relegation to Serie D

(C) Champions; (P) Promoted; (R) Relegated

== Promotion and relegation playoffs ==
=== Serie C2/A ===
==== Promotion ====
Promotion playoff semifinals
First legs to be played May 18, 2008; return legs to be played May 25, 2008

Team 1	Agg.	Team 2	1st leg	2nd leg
Mezzocorona (5)	2-1	(2) Carpenedolo	2-1	0-0
Lumezzane (4)	2-1	(3) Rodengo Saiano	1-1	1-0

Promotion playoff finals
First leg to be played June 1, 2008; return leg played to be June 8, 2008

Team 1	Agg.	Team 2	1st leg	2nd leg
Mezzocorona (5)	0-0(et)	(4) Lumezzane	0-0	0-0

Lumezzane promoted to Serie C1

==== Relegation ====
Relegation playoffs
First legs to be played May 18, 2008; return legs to be played May 25, 2008

Team 1	Agg.	Team 2	1st leg	2nd leg
Valenzana (17)	2-1	(14) Cuneo	2-0	0-1
Calcio Caravaggese (16)	0-1	(15) Pavia	0-1	0-0

Cuneo and Calcio Caravaggese relegated to Serie D

=== Serie C2/B ===
==== Promotion ====
Promotion playoff semifinals
First legs to be played May 18, 2008; return legs to be played May 25, 2008

Team 1	Agg.	Team 2	1st leg	2nd leg
San Marino (5)	3-3	(2) Bassano	2-0	1-3
SPAL (4)	4-4	(3) Portosummaga	2-1	2-3

Promotion playoff finals
First leg to be played June 1, 2008; return leg played to be June 8, 2008

Team 1	Agg.	Team 2	1st leg	2nd leg
Portosummaga (3)	5-3	(2) Bassano	3-2	2-1

Portosummaga promoted to Serie C1

==== Relegation ====
Relegation playoffs
First legs to be played May 18, 2008; return legs to be played May 25, 2008

Team 1	Agg.	Team 2	1st leg	2nd leg
Viterbese (17)	1-3	(14) Viareggio	0-1	1-2
Rovigo (16)	3-3	(15) Castelnuovo	0-1	3-2

Viterbese and Rovigo relegated to Serie D

=== Serie C2/C ===
==== Promotion ====
Promotion playoff semifinals
First legs to be played May 18, 2008; return legs to be played May 25, 2008

Team 1	Agg.	Team 2	1st leg	2nd leg
Celano (5)	3-2	(2) Pescina V.d.G.	2-1	1-1
Vigor Lamezia (4)	1-3	(3) Real Marcianise	1-1	0-2

Promotion playoff finals
First leg to be played June 1, 2008; return leg played to be June 8, 2008

Team 1	Agg.	Team 2	1st leg	2nd leg
Celano (5)	1-3	(3) Real Marcianise	0-0	1-3

Real Marcianise promoted to Serie C1

==== Relegation ====
Relegation playoffs
First legs to be played May 18, 2008; return legs to be played May 25, 2008

Team 1	Agg.	Team 2	1st leg	2nd leg
Andria (17)	1-1	(14) Vibonese	0-1	1-0
Scafatese (16)	3-2	(15) Val di Sangro	1-0	2-2

Andria and Val di Sangro relegated to Serie D

== Clubs ==
=== Serie C2/A ===
Club	City	Stadium	2006/2007 Season
U.S. Calcio Caravaggese	Calcio	Stadio Comunale	2nd in Serie D/B
F.C. Canavese	San Giusto Canavese	Stadio Franco Cerutti	1st in Serie D/A
A.C. Carpenedolo	Carpenedolo	Stadio Mundial '82	6th in Serie C2/A
A.C. Cuneo 1905	Cuneo	Stadio Fratelli Paschiero	13th in Serie C2/A
U.S. Ivrea Calcio	Ivrea	Stadio Gino Pistoni	17th in Serie C1/A
A.C. Lumezzane	Lumezzane	Nuovo Stadio Comunale	14th in Serie C2/A
A.C. Mezzocorona	Mezzocorona	Stadio Comunale	1st in Serie D/C
F.C. Nuorese Calcio	Nuoro	Stadio Franco Frogheri	4th in Serie C2/A
Olbia Calcio	Olbia	Stadio Bruno Nespoli	9th in Serie C2/A
A.C. Pavia	Pavia	Stadio Pietro Fortunati	18th in Serie C1/A
U.S. Pergocrema 1932	Crema	Stadio Giuseppe Voltini	3rd in Serie C2/A
AS Pizzighettone	Pizzighettone	Stadio Comunale	16th in Serie C1/A
U.S. Pro Vercelli Calcio	Vercelli	Stadio Silvio Piola	8th in Serie C2/A
A.C. Rodengo Saiano	Rodengo-Saiano	Stadio Comunale	1st in Serie D/D
Sassari Torres 1903	Sassari	Stadio Vanni Sanna	12th in Serie C2/A
F.C. Südtirol-Alto Adige	Bolzano	Stadio Marco Druso	7th in Serie C2/A
Valenzana Calcio	Valenza	Stadio Comunale	10th in Serie C2/A
A.S. Varese 1910	Varese	Stadio Franco Ossola	11th in Serie C2/A

=== Serie C2/B ===
Club	City	Stadium	2006/2007 Season
Bassano Virtus 55 S.T.	Bassano del Grappa	Stadio Rino Mercante	5th in Serie C2/A
A.C. Bellaria Igea Marina	Bellaria-Igea Marina	Stadio Enrico Nanni	12th in Serie C2/B
Carrarese Calcio	Carrara	Stadio dei Marmi	15th in Serie C2/B
U.S. Castelnuovo Garfagnana	Castelnuovo di Garfagnana	Stadio Alessio Nardini	7th in Serie C2/B
Cuoio Pelli Cappiano Romaiano	Santa Croce sull'Arno	Stadio Libero Masini	10th in Serie C2/B
Giulianova Calcio	Giulianova	Stadio Rubens Fadini	18th in Serie C1/B
A.S. Gubbio 1910	Gubbio	Stadio Polisportivo San Biagio	11th in Serie C2/B
U.S. Poggibonsi	Poggibonsi	Stadio Stefano Lotti	13th in Serie C2/B
Calcio Portogruaro-Summaga	Portogruaro	Stadio Pier Giovanni Mecchia	15th in Serie C2/A
A.C. Prato	Prato	Stadio Lungobisenzio	9th in Serie C2/B
A.C. Reggiana 1919	Reggio Emilia	Stadio Giglio	5th in Serie C2/B
Rovigo Calcio	Rovigo	Stadio Francesco Gabrielli	6th in Serie C2/B
San Marino Calcio	Serravalle, San Marino	Stadio Olimpico	17th in Serie C1/B
A.C. Sansovino	Monte San Savino	Stadio Comunale	17th in Serie C2/B
SPAL 1907	Ferrara	Stadio Paolo Mazza	3rd in Serie C2/B
Teramo Calcio	Teramo	Stadio Comunale	15th in Serie C1/B
F.C. Esperia Viareggio	Viareggio	Stadio dei Pini	1st in Serie D/E
A.S. Viterbese Calcio	Viterbo	Stadio Enrico Rocchi	8th in Serie C2/B

=== Serie C2/C ===
Club	City	Stadium	2006/2007 Season
A.S. Andria BAT	Andria	Stadio degli Ulivi	8th in Serie C2/C
Benevento Calcio	Benevento	Stadio Santa Colomba	2nd in Serie C2/C
S.S. Cassino 1927	Cassino	Stadio Gino Salveti	13th in Serie C2/C
F.C. Catanzaro	Catanzaro	Stadio Nicola Ceravolo	9th in Serie C2/C
Celano F.C. Olimpia	Celano	Stadio Comunale	14th in Serie C2/C
A.S. Cisco Calcio Roma	Rome	Stadio Flaminio	2nd in Serie C2/B
Gela Calcio	Gela	Stadio Vincenzo Presti	4th in Serie C2/C
F.C. Igea Virtus Barcellona	Barcellona Pozzo di Gotto	Stadio Carlo D'Alcontres	11th in Serie C2/C
Real Marcianise Calcio	Marcianise	Stadio Progreditur	10th in Serie C2/C
A.S. Melfi	Melfi	Stadio Arturo Valerio	15th in Serie C2/C
A.C. Monopoli	Monopoli	Stadio Vito Simone Veneziani	5th in Serie C2/C
F.C. Sporting Neapolis	Naples	Stadio Arturo Collana	1st in Serie D/I
A.S. Noicattaro Calcio	Noicattaro	Stadio Comunale	1st in Serie D/H
A.S. Pescina Valle del Giovenco	Pescina	Stadio Alfredo Barbati	1st in Serie D/F
S.S. Scafatese Calcio 1922	Scafati	Stadio Comunale	1st in Serie D/G
Pol. Val di Sangro	Atessa	Stadio Montemarcone	6th in Serie C2/C
U.S. Vibonese Calcio	Vibo Valentia	Stadio Luigi Razza	12th in Serie C2/C
Vigor Lamezia	Lamezia Terme	Stadio Guido D'Ippolito	7th in Serie C2/C
