= 2006–07 Serie C2 =

Italian football league season

Geographical distribution of 2006-07 Serie C2 teams. Serie C2/A teams are depicted with red dots, Serie C2/B with green, and Serie C2/C with yellow ones.

The 2006–07 Serie C2 was the football (soccer) league season of Italian Serie C2 for the years 2006 and 2007. It was divided into two phases: the regular season, played from September 3, 2006 to May 13, 2007 and the playoff phase. Once the regular season was over, teams placed 2nd to 5th entered a playoff to determine the second team in each division to be promoted to Serie C1. At the same time, teams placed 14th to 17th entered a playout for the right to remain in Serie C2 the following season.

As usual, Serie C2 was composed by three divisions, whose teams were divided geographically. Division C2/A was mainly composed by Northern Italy and Sardinian teams, whereas division C2/B included North-Central and Central Italy teams, with the exception of two teams from Campania (Paganese and Giugliano), and division C2/C was represented by teams hailing from Central-Southern Italy and Sicily.

Teams finishing first in the regular season, plus one team winning the playoff round from each division were promoted to Serie C1; teams finishing last in the regular season, plus two relegation playoff losers from each division were relegated to Serie D. In all, six teams were promoted to Serie C1, and nine teams were relegated to Serie D.

Teams relegating to Serie D also lost the right to maintain their professional status.

== Standings ==
=== Serie C2/A ===
Final table

Pos	Team	Pld	W	D	L	GF	GA	GD	Pts	Promotion or relegation
1	Legnano (P, C)	34	17	10	7	34	22	+12	61	Promoted to Serie C1
2	Lecco (P)	34	16	12	6	42	28	+14	60	Won promotion playoffs
3	Pergocrema	34	17	8	9	45	35	+10	59	Lost in promotion playoffs
4	Nuorese	34	15	12	7	45	31	+14	57	Lost in promotion playoffs
5	Bassano Virtus	34	13	16	5	44	31	+13	55	Lost in promotion playoffs
6	Carpenedolo	34	13	13	8	47	41	+6	52	
7	Südtirol	34	12	13	9	37	33	+4	49	
8	Pro Vercelli	34	11	12	11	38	35	+3	44 (Note: including 1 point deduction)	
9	Olbia	34	10	12	12	31	33	−2	42	
10	Valenzana	34	11	9	14	33	38	−5	42	
11	Varese	34	9	14	11	32	35	−3	41	
12	Sassari Torres	34	10	12	12	33	39	−6	40 (Note: including 2 points deduction)	
13	Cuneo	34	9	11	14	43	46	−3	38	
14	Lumezzane	34	8	13	13	25	36	−11	37	Won relegation playoff
15	Portosummaga	34	8	12	14	35	43	−8	36	Won relegation playoff
16	Montichiari (R)	34	8	10	16	29	36	−7	34	Lost relegation playoff
17	Biellese (R)	34	8	9	17	32	49	−17	33	Lost relegation playoff
18	Sanremese (R)	34	7	10	17	18	32	−14	31	Relegated to Serie D

(C) Champions; (P) Promoted; (R) Relegated

=== Serie C2/B ===
Final table

Pos	Team	Pld	W	D	L	GF	GA	GD	Pts	Promotion or relegation
1	Foligno (P, C)	34	16	14	4	41	22	+19	62	Promoted to Serie C1
2	Cisco Roma	34	16	12	6	36	24	+12	60	Lost in promotion playoffs
3	SPAL	34	15	14	5	57	37	+20	59	Lost in promotion playoffs
4	Paganese (P)	34	16	9	9	54	41	+13	57	Won promotion playoffs
5	Reggiana	34	12	15	7	45	38	+7	51	Lost in promotion playoffs
6	Rovigo	34	13	10	11	43	43	0	49	
7	Castelnuovo	34	14	7	13	43	45	−2	49	
8	Viterbese	34	10	16	8	39	41	−2	46	
9	Prato	34	10	13	11	39	41	−2	43	
10	Cuoiocappiano	34	8	18	8	29	31	−2	42	
11	Gubbio	34	10	11	13	32	37	−5	41	
12	Bellaria Igea	34	9	13	12	38	37	+1	40	
13	Poggibonsi	34	9	12	13	26	34	−8	39	
14	Boca S. Lazzaro (R)	34	9	11	14	44	46	−2	38	Lost relegation playoff
15	Carrarese	34	7	16	11	21	25	−4	37	Won relegation playoff
16	Rieti (R)	34	9	8	17	36	43	−7	35	Lost relegation playoff
17	Sansovino	34	6	12	16	41	53	−12	30	Won relegation playoff
18	Giugliano (R)	34	7	9	18	29	55	−26	28 (Note: including 2 points deduction)	Relegated to Serie D

(C) Champions; (P) Promoted; (R) Relegated

=== Serie C2/C ===
Final table

Pos	Team	Pld	W	D	L	GF	GA	GD	Pts	Promotion or relegation
1	Sorrento (P, C)	34	17	13	4	48	26	+22	64	Promoted to Serie C1
2	Benevento	34	17	12	5	42	21	+21	63	Lost in promotion playoffs
3	Potenza (P)	34	16	6	12	37	32	+5	54	Won promotion playoffs
4	Gela	34	16	6	12	29	31	−2	54	Lost in promotion playoffs
5	Monopoli	34	14	11	9	42	35	+7	53	Lost in promotion playoffs
6	Val di Sangro	34	14	10	10	39	36	+3	52	
7	Vigor Lamezia	34	14	10	10	35	24	+11	50 (Note: including 2 points deduction)	
8	Andria	34	12	13	9	30	31	−1	49	
9	Catanzaro	34	11	12	11	34	27	+7	45	
10	Real Marcianise	34	12	8	14	48	47	+1	44	
11	Igea Virtus	34	8	17	9	35	35	0	41	
12	Vibonese	34	10	11	13	42	45	−3	41	
13	Cassino	34	11	8	15	39	42	−3	40 (Note: including 1 point deduction)	
14	Celano Olimpia	34	10	10	14	36	43	−7	40	Won relegation playoff
15	Melfi	34	10	8	16	27	43	−16	38	Won relegation playoff
16	Nocerina (R)	34	10	7	17	31	38	−7	37	Lost relegation playoff
17	Pro Vasto (R)	34	8	7	19	23	42	−19	31	Lost relegation playoff
18	Rende (R)	34	7	9	18	35	54	−19	30	Relegated to Serie D

(C) Champions; (P) Promoted; (R) Relegated

== Promotion and relegation playoffs ==
=== Serie C2/A ===
==== Promotion ====
Promotion playoff semifinals
First legs played May 27, 2007; return legs played June 3, 2007

Team 1	Agg.	Team 2	1st leg	2nd leg
Bassano (5)	1-2	(2) Lecco	0-0	1-2
Nuorese (4)	1-3	(3) Pergocrema	1-1	0-2

Promotion playoff finals
First leg played June 10, 2007; return leg played June 17, 2007

Team 1	Agg.	Team 2	1st leg	2nd leg
Pergocrema (3)	1-2	(2) Lecco	0-1	1-1

Pergocrema promoted to Serie C1

==== Relegation ====
Relegation playoffs
First legs played May 27, 2007; return legs played June 3, 2007

Team 1	Agg.	Team 2	1st leg	2nd leg
Biellese (17)	2-3	(14) Lumezzane	1-0	1-3
Montichiari (16)	1-1	(15) Portosummaga	0-0	1-1

Biellese and Montichiari relegated to Serie D

=== Serie C2/B ===
==== Promotion ====
Promotion playoff semifinals
First legs played May 27, 2007; return legs played June 3, 2007

Team 1	Agg.	Team 2	1st leg	2nd leg
Reggiana (5)	2-0	(2) Cisco Roma	1-0	1-0
Paganese (4)	2-1	(3) SPAL	1-0	1-1

Promotion playoff finals
First leg played June 10, 2007; return leg played June 17, 2007

Team 1	Agg.	Team 2	1st leg	2nd leg
Reggiana (5)	1-2(aet)	(4) Paganese	1-0	0-2

Paganese promoted to Serie C1

==== Relegation ====
Relegation playoffs
First legs played May 27, 2007; return legs played June 3, 2007

Team 1	Agg.	Team 2	1st leg	2nd leg
Sansovino (17)	3-2	(14) Boca S. Lazzaro	3-1	0-1
Rieti (16)	2-2	(15) Carrarese	0-1	2-1

Boca San Lazzaro and Rieti relegated to Serie D

=== Serie C2/C ===
==== Promotion ====
Promotion playoff semifinals
First legs played May 27, 2007; return legs played June 3, 2007

Team 1	Agg.	Team 2	1st leg	2nd leg
Monopoli (5)	0-3	(2) Benevento	0-0	0-3
Gela (4)	1-1	(3) Potenza	0-0	1-1

Promotion playoff finals
First leg played June 10, 2007; return leg played June 17, 2007

Team 1	Agg.	Team 2	1st leg	2nd leg
Potenza (3)	2-1(aet)	(2) Benevento	1-0	1-1

Potenza promoted to Serie C1

==== Relegation ====
Relegation playoffs
First legs played May 27, 2007; return legs played June 3, 2007

Team 1	Agg.	Team 2	1st leg	2nd leg
Pro Vasto (17)	3-3	(14) Celano Olimpia	1-1	2-2
Nocerina (16)	1-2	(15) Melfi	0-0	1-2

Pro Vasto and Nocerina relegated to Serie D

== Clubs ==
=== Serie C2/A ===
Club	City	Stadium	2005/2006 Season
Bassano Virtus 55 S.T.	Bassano del Grappa	Stadio Rino Mercante	13th in Serie C2/A
A.S. Biellese 1902	Biella	Stadio Antonio Lamarmora	16th in Serie C2/A
A.C. Carpenedolo	Carpenedolo	Stadio Mundial '82	5th in Serie C2/A
A.C. Cuneo 1905	Cuneo	Stadio Fratelli Paschiero	2nd in Serie C2/A
Calcio Lecco 1912	Lecco	Stadio Rigamonti-Ceppi	10th in Serie C2/A
A.C. Legnano	Legnano	Stadio Giovanni Mari	11th in Serie C2/A
A.C. Lumezzane	Lumezzane	Nuovo Stadio Comunale	17th in Serie C1/A
A.C. Montichiari	Montichiari	Stadio Romeo Menti	12th in Serie C2/A
F.C. Nuorese Calcio	Nuoro	Stadio Franco Frogheri	Serie D/B Champions
Olbia Calcio	Olbia	Stadio Bruno Nespoli	17th in Serie C2/A
U.S. Pergocrema 1932	Crema	Stadio Giuseppe Voltini	8th in Serie C2/A
Calcio Portogruaro-Summaga A.S.	Portogruaro	Stadio Pier Giovanni Mecchia	15th in Serie C2/A
U.S. Pro Vercelli Calcio	Vercelli	Stadio Silvio Piola	6th in Serie C2/A
U.S. Sanremese Calcio	Sanremo	Stadio Comunale	7th in Serie C2/A
F.C. Südtirol-Alto Adige	Bolzano	Stadio Marco Druso	4th in Serie C2/A
Sassari Torres 1903	Sassari	Stadio Vanni Sanna	3rd in Serie C1/B
Valenzana Calcio	Valenza	Stadio Comunale	9th in Serie C2/A
A.S. Varese 1910	Varese	Stadio Franco Ossola	Serie D/A Champions

=== Serie C2/B ===
Club	City	Stadium	2005/2006 Season
A.C. Bellaria Igea Marina	Bellaria-Igea Marina	Stadio Enrico Nanni	9th in Serie C2/B
A.C. Boca San Lazzaro	San Lazzaro di Savena	Stadio Kennedy	Serie D/C Champions
Carrarese Calcio	Carrara	Stadio dei Marmi	14th in Serie C2/B
U.S. Castelnuovo Garfagnana	Castelnuovo di Garfagnana	Stadio Alessio Nardini	7th in Serie C2/B
A.S. Cisco Roma	Rome	Stadio Flaminio	6th in Serie C2/C
Cuoio Pelli Cappiano Romaiano	Santa Croce sull'Arno	Stadio Libero Masini	6th in Serie C2/B
Foligno Calcio	Foligno	Stadio Enzo Blasone	10th in Serie C2/B
S.S.C. Giugliano	Giugliano in Campania	Stadio Alberto Di Cristofaro	8th in Serie C2/C
A.S. Gubbio 1910	Gubbio	Stadio Polisportivo San Biagio	12th in Serie C2/B
Paganese Calcio 1926	Pagani	Stadio Marcello Torre	Serie D/H Champions
U.S. Poggibonsi	Poggibonsi	Stadio Stefano Lotti	3rd in Serie D/E
A.C. Prato	Prato	Stadio Lungobisenzio	15th in Serie C2/B
A.C. Reggiana 1919	Reggio Emilia	Stadio Giglio	9th in Serie C2/B
F.C. Rieti	Rieti	Stadio Centro d'Italia	14th in Serie C2/C
Rovigo Calcio	Rovigo	Stadio Francesco Gabrielli	Serie D/D Champions
A.C. Sansovino	Monte San Savino	Stadio Comunale	3rd in Serie C2/B
SPAL 1907	Ferrara	Stadio Paolo Mazza	11th in Serie C2/B
A.S. Viterbese Calcio	Viterbo	Stadio Enrico Rocchi	7th in Serie C2/C

=== Serie C2/C ===
Club	City	Stadium	2005/2006 Season
A.S. Andria BAT	Andria	Stadio degli Ulivi	11th in Serie C2/C
Benevento Calcio	Benevento	Stadio Santa Colomba	4th in Serie C2/B
S.S. Cassino 1927	Cassino	Stadio Gino Salveti	Serie D/G Champions
F.C. Catanzaro	Catanzaro	Stadio Nicola Ceravolo	22nd in Serie B
Celano F.C. Olimpia	Celano	Stadio Comunale	Serie D Playoff Runners-up
Gela Calcio	Gela	Stadio Vincenzo Presti	12th in Serie C1/B
F.C. Igea Virtus Barcellona	Barcellona Pozzo di Gotto	Stadio Carlo D'Alcontres	12th in Serie C2/C
A.S. Melfi	Melfi	Stadio Arturo Valerio	5th in Serie C2/C
A.C. Monopoli	Monopoli	Stadio Vito Simone Veneziani	Serie D Playoff Winners
A.G. Nocerina 1910	Nocera Inferiore	Stadio San Francesco	13th in Serie C2/C
Potenza S.C.	Potenza	Stadio Alfredo Viviani	15th in Serie C2/C
F.C. Pro Vasto	Vasto	Stadio Aragona	4th in Serie C2/C
Real Marcianise Calcio	Marcianise	Stadio Progreditur	9th in Serie C2/C
Rende Calcio	Rende	Stadio Marco Lorenzon	3rd in Serie C2/C
Sorrento Calcio	Sorrento	Stadio Italia	Serie D/I Champions
Pol. Val di Sangro	Atessa	Stadio Montemarcone	Serie D/F Champions
U.S. Vibonese Calcio	Vibo Valentia	Stadio Luigi Razza	2nd in Serie D/I
Vigor Lamezia	Lamezia Terme	Stadio Guido D'Ippolito	10th in Serie C2/C
