= 2008–09 Lega Pro Prima Divisione =

Football competition in Italy

Geographical distribution of 2008-09 Lega Pro Prima Divisione teams. Girone A teams are depicted with red dots, whereas Girone B ones were represented with yellow.

The 2008–09 Lega Pro Prima Divisione season is the thirty-first since its renaming to Serie C1 in 1978, and the first edition since the renaming from Serie C1 to Lega Pro. It was divided into two phases: the regular season, played from September 2008 to May 2009, and the playoff phase from May to June 2009.

The league was composed of 36 teams divided into two divisions of 18 teams each, whose teams was divided mainly according to geographical principles. Teams will play only other teams in their own division, once at home and once away for a total of 34 matches.

Teams finishing first in the regular season, plus one team winning the playoff round from each division, were promoted to Serie B; teams finishing last in the regular season, plus two relegation playoff losers from each division was relegated to Lega Pro Seconda Divisione. In all, four teams was promoted to Serie B, and six teams were relegated to Lega Pro Seconda Divisione.

== Events ==
=== Start of season ===
The league was to feature four teams relegated from Serie B in 2007–08; Avellino, Ravenna, Spezia, and Cesena. Two vacancies were created with the re-admission of Avellino to Serie B, and the bankruptcy of Spezia.

It featured six teams promoted from 2007–08 Serie C2: Pergocrema, Reggiana, Benevento, Lumezzane, Portosummaga, and Marcianise.

The remaining 26 teams were to come from the teams that played in 2007–08 Serie C1 that were neither promoted nor relegated. Of those, Lucchese (8th in Girone B), and Massese (13th in Girone B) were also banned creating two more vacancies.

Three of the four vacancies were filled by Virtus Lanciano, Pro Patria and Lecco which had lost in last year's Serie C1 relegation playoffs and were destined to play in Lega Pro Seconda Divisione. The fourth vacancy was filled by SPAL, which lost in last year's Serie C2 promotional playoffs and was thus destined to remain there.

=== Promotions ===
Cesena won direct promotion to Serie B for the 2009–10 season by finishing first in Girone A. Just one year ago Cesena was directly relegated from the same Serie B for finishing in last place. Gallipoli also won direct promotion to Serie B by being crowned champions in Girone B. It was Gallipoli's third consecutive year in Lega Pro Prima Divisione/C1 after winning promotion from Serie C2 in 2005–06.

=== Relegations ===
Legnano and Potenza were the first two teams relegated by finishing last in their respective divisions. Both teams had been in Prima Divisione/C1 for two consecutive years after winning promotion from 2006–07 Serie C2.

Four teams were relegated by losing in the relegation playoffs. Pro Sesto was relegated after 4 seasons in Prima Divisione/C1, winning promotion from C2 in 2004–05. Pro Sesto was forced to play in the playouts two other times, winning one and losing the other in 2006, but asked to remain in C1 to fill vacancies. Sambenedettese also lost in the Girone A playouts after 7 seasons in Prima Divisione/C1, winning promotion from C2 in 2001–02.

In Girone B, Pistoiese and Juve Stabia lost in the relegation playoffs. Pistoiese had been in 2001–02 Serie B, and after being relegated that year, spent the next 7 years in Prima Divisione/C1. Juve Stabia was promoted from C2 2004–05, spending the next four seasons in C1/Lega Pro.

== Teams ==
On 14 August 2008 the following clubs were confirmed to be competing in the division:

=== Girone A ===
Club	City	Stadium	Capacity	2007–08 season
A.C. Cesena	Cesena	Stadio Dino Manuzzi	23,860	22nd in Serie B
U.S. Cremonese	Cremona	Stadio Giovanni Zini	22,000	2nd in Serie C1/A
Calcio Lecco 1912	Lecco	Stadio Rigamonti-Ceppi	4,977	16th in Serie C1/A
A.C. Legnano	Legnano	Stadio Giovanni Mari	6,600	7th in Serie C1/A
A.C. Lumezzane	Lumezzane	Nuovo Stadio Comunale	4,150	Serie C2/A Play-off Winners
A.C. Monza Brianza 1912	Monza	Stadio Brianteo	18,568	8th in Serie C1/A
Novara Calcio	Novara	Stadio Silvio Piola	8,810	9th in Serie C1/A
Calcio Padova	Padua	Stadio Euganeo	32,336	6th in Serie C1/A
U.S. Pergocrema 1932	Crema	Stadio Giuseppe Voltini	3,490	Serie C2/A Champions
Calcio Portogruaro Summaga	Portogruaro	Stadio Pier Giovanni Mecchia	3,335	Serie C2/B Play-off Winners
Pro Patria	Busto Arsizio	Stadio Carlo Speroni	3,990	14th in Serie C1/A
A.C. Pro Sesto	Sesto San Giovanni	Stadio Breda	4,500	11th in Serie C1/A
Ravenna Calcio	Ravenna	Stadio Bruno Benelli	12,020	20th in Serie B
A.C. Reggiana 1919	Reggio Emilia	Stadio Giglio	29,546	Serie C2/B Champions
S.S. Sambenedettese Calcio	San Benedetto del Tronto	Stadio Riviera delle Palme	22,000	12th in Serie C1/B
SPAL 1907	Ferrara	Stadio Paolo Mazza	19,000	4th in Serie C2/B
S.S.C. Venezia	Venice	Stadio Pier Luigi Penzo	10,500	12th in Serie C1/A
Hellas Verona F.C.	Verona	Stadio Marcantonio Bentegodi	39,211	17th in Serie C1/A

=== Girone B ===
Club	City	Stadium	Capacity	2007–08 season
A.C. Arezzo	Arezzo	Stadio Città di Arezzo	13,128	7th in Serie C1/B
Benevento Calcio	Benevento	Stadio Santa Colomba	18,927	Serie C2/C Champions
S.S. Cavese 1919	Cava de' Tirreni	Stadio Simonetta Lamberti	16,000	10th in Serie C1/A
F.C. Crotone	Crotone	Stadio Ezio Scida	9,631	4th in Serie C1/B
U.S. Foggia	Foggia	Stadio Pino Zaccheria	25,000	5th in Serie C1/A
Foligno Calcio	Foligno	Stadio Enzo Blasone	5,650	4th in Serie C1/A
Gallipoli Calcio	Gallipoli	Stadio Antonio Bianco	5,000	9th in Serie C1/B
S.S. Juve Stabia	Castellammare di Stabia	Stadio Romeo Menti	10,400	15th in Serie C1/B
Real Marcianise Calcio	Marcianise	Stadio Progreditur	3,000	Serie C2/C Play-off Winners
Paganese Calcio 1926	Pagani	Stadio Marcello Torre	3,700	15th in Serie C1/A
Perugia Calcio	Perugia	Stadio Renato Curi	28,000	5th in Serie C1/B
Pescara Calcio	Pescara	Stadio Adriatico	22,260	6th in Serie C1/B
A.C. Pistoiese	Pistoia	Stadio Marcello Melani	13,195	14th in Serie C1/B
Potenza S.C.	Potenza	Stadio Alfredo Viviani	6,000	11th in Serie C1/B
Sorrento Calcio	Sorrento	Stadio Italia	3,600	10th in Serie C1/B
Taranto Sport	Taranto	Stadio Erasmo Iacovone	28,000	3rd in Serie C1/B
Ternana Calcio	Terni	Stadio Libero Liberati	20,095	13th in Serie C1/A
S.S. Virtus Lanciano 1924	Lanciano	Stadio Guido Biondi	7,500	16th in Serie C1/B

== League tables ==
=== Girone A ===
Pos	Team	Pld	W	D	L	GF	GA	GD	Pts	Promotion or relegation
1	Cesena (C, P)	34	17	9	8	42	26	+16	60	Promotion to Serie B
2	Pro Patria	34	16	10	8	50	27	+23	58	Qualification for Promotion play-off
3	Ravenna	34	15	11	8	48	36	+12	56	Qualification for Promotion play-off
4	Padova (O, P)	34	15	9	10	37	31	+6	54	Promotion to Serie B
5	Reggiana	34	14	12	8	34	33	+1	54	Qualification for Promotion play-off
6	SPAL	34	14	11	9	38	30	+8	53	
7	Hellas Verona	34	11	15	8	38	32	+6	48	
8	Novara	34	11	13	10	36	36	0	46	
9	Cremonese	34	11	12	11	38	36	+2	45	
10	Lumezzane	34	10	15	9	37	35	+2	45	
11	Pergocrema	34	10	14	10	28	28	0	44	
12	Portogruaro	34	11	10	13	33	39	−6	43	
13	Monza	34	8	14	12	41	48	−7	38	
14	Pro Sesto (R)	34	9	10	15	34	49	−15	37	Qualification for Relegation play-off
15	Lecco	34	7	14	13	31	35	−4	35	Qualification for Relegation play-off
16	Sambenedettese (R)	34	7	11	16	22	36	−14	32	Relegation to Eccellenza
17	Venezia (R)	34	8	11	15	35	42	−7	31 (Note: 4 points deducted)	Relegation to Serie D
18	Legnano (R)	34	7	9	18	31	54	−23	30	Relegation to Lega Pro Seconda Divisione

Updated to match(es) played on 10 May 2009. Source: Lega Calcio Professionistico
Rules for classification: 1) points; 2) goal difference; 3) number of goals scored.
(C) Champions; (O) Play-off winners; (P) Promoted; (R) Relegated

=== Girone B ===
Pos	Team	Pld	W	D	L	GF	GA	GD	Pts	Promotion or relegation
1	Gallipoli (C, P)	34	20	6	8	55	32	+23	66	Promotion to Serie B
2	Benevento	34	18	10	6	49	31	+18	64	Qualification for Promotion play-off
3	Crotone (O, P)	34	18	5	11	46	37	+9	59	Promotion to Serie B
4	Arezzo	34	15	11	8	56	37	+19	56	Qualification for Promotion play-off
5	Foggia	34	14	14	6	44	33	+11	56	Qualification for Promotion play-off
6	Cavese	34	14	11	9	40	35	+5	53	
7	Real Marcianise	34	10	13	11	32	33	−1	43	
8	Perugia	34	11	10	13	33	30	+3	43	
9	Taranto	34	12	6	16	31	41	−10	42	
10	Ternana	34	9	15	10	36	34	+2	42	
11	Sorrento	34	10	12	12	37	39	−2	42	
12	Pescara	34	10	13	11	36	45	−9	42 (Note: 1 point deducted)	
13	Paganese	34	9	14	11	21	29	−8	41	
14	Virtus Lanciano	34	12	5	17	37	46	−9	41	Qualification for Relegation play-off
15	Foligno	34	8	11	15	35	45	−10	35	Qualification for Relegation play-off
16	Pistoiese (R)	34	7	12	15	27	42	−15	33	Relegation to Eccellenza
17	Juve Stabia (R)	34	8	10	16	29	40	−11	32 (Note: 2 points deducted)	Relegation to Relegation play-off
18	Potenza	34	7	10	17	24	39	−15	28 (Note: 3 points deducted)	Relegation to Lega Pro Seconda Divisione (Note: Potenza was reprieved from relegation to fill vacancy.)

Updated to match(es) played on 10 May 2009. Source: Lega Calcio Professionistico
Rules for classification: 1) points; 2) goal difference; 3) number of goals scored.
(C) Champions; (O) Play-off winners; (P) Promoted; (R) Relegated

== Promotion and relegation playoffs ==
=== Girone A ===
==== Promotion ====
Promotion playoff semifinals
First legs played 31 May 2009; return legs played 7 June 2009

Team 1	Agg.	Team 2	1st leg	2nd leg
Reggiana (5)	6–8	(2) Pro Patria	4–5	2–3
Padova (4)	3–2	(3) Ravenna	1–1	2–1

Promotion playoff finals
First legs played 14 June 2009; return legs played 21 June 2009

Team 1	Agg.	Team 2	1st leg	2nd leg
Padova (4)	2–1	(2) Pro Patria	0–0	2–1

Padova promoted to Serie B

==== Relegation ====
Relegation playoffs
First legs played 31 May 2009; return legs played 7 June 2009

Team 1	Agg.	Team 2	1st leg	2nd leg
Venezia (17)	4–2	(14) Pro Sesto	3–1	1–1
Sambenedettese (16)	0–1	(15) Lecco	0–0	0–1

Pro Sesto and Sambenedettese relegated to Lega Pro Seconda Divisione

=== Girone B ===
==== Promotion ====
Promotion playoff semifinals
First legs played 31 May 2009; return legs played 7 June 2009

Team 1	Agg.	Team 2	1st leg	2nd leg
Foggia (5)	2–2	(2) Benevento	0–0	2–2
Arezzo (4)	1–6	(3) Crotone	1–2	0–4

Promotion playoff finals
First legs played 14 June 2009; return legs played 21 June 2009

Team 1	Agg.	Team 2	1st leg	2nd leg
Crotone (3)	2–1	(2) Benevento	1–1	1–0

Crotone promoted to Serie B

==== Relegation ====
Relegation playoffs
First legs played 31 May 2009; return legs played 7 June 2009

Team 1	Agg.	Team 2	1st leg	2nd leg
Juve Stabia (17)	2–2	(14) Virtus Lanciano	2–1	0–1
Pistoiese (16)	2–2	(15) Foligno	2–1	0–1

Juve Stabia and Pistoiese relegated to Lega Pro Seconda Divisione
