= 2009–10 Lega Pro Prima Divisione =

Football league season

Geographical distribution of 2009-10 Lega Pro Prima Divisione teams. Girone A teams are depicted with red dots, whereas Girone B ones were represented with yellow.

The 2009–10 Lega Pro Prima Divisione season was the thirty-second football league season of Italian Lega Pro Prima Divisione since its establishment in 1978, and the second since the renaming from Serie C to Lega Pro.

It was divided into two phases: the regular season, played from 23 August 2009 to May 2010, and the playoff phase from May to June 2010.

The league was contested by 36 teams, geographically divided into two divisions of 18 teams each. Teams only played other teams in their own division, once at home and once away for a total of 34 matches each.

Teams finishing first in the regular season, plus one team winning the playoff round from each division were promoted to Serie B; teams finishing last in the regular season, plus two relegation playoff losers from each division were relegated to Lega Pro Seconda Divisione. Four teams were thus promoted to Serie B and six teams were relegated to Lega Pro Seconda Divisione.

== Events ==
=== Start of season ===
The league was to feature four teams relegated from Serie B in 2008–09; Rimini, Pisa, Avellino, and Treviso. On July 9, the Covisoc (Commissione di Vigilanza sulle Società Calcistiche, Vigilancy Commission on Football Clubs) organization announced that Pisa, Avellino, and Treviso did not pass the financial requirements in order to be admitted to the league. The clubs were allowed to appeal the decision until 11 July. On 10 July, Pisa announced they were not appealing the exclusion from the league due to their failure to meet the financial requirements. The next day, Treviso and Avellino failed to appeal the exclusion as well.

It is to feature six teams promoted from 2008–09 Lega Pro Seconda Divisione; the three division winners - Varese, Figline & Cosenza, and the three playoff winners - Como, Giulianova & Pescina V.d.G.

The remaining 26 teams were to come from the teams that played in 2008–09 Lega Pro Prima Divisione that were neither promoted nor relegated. Of those, Venezia (17th in Girone A), and Perugia (8th in Girone B) were also listed by the Covisoc organization as not having met the financial requirements to be admitted. On July 11, Venice mayor Massimo Cacciari announced Venezia did not manage to fulfil the financial requirements to appeal the exclusion. On the other hand, the commission did allow Perugia to remain in Prima Divisione on appeal.

On 30 July 2009, the four vacancies created were filled by the following teams, all of which were destined to play in Lega Pro Seconda Divisione for the 2009–10 season before the call-up:

- Potenza, which finished last in Prima Divisione 2008-09 - Girone B
- Alessandria, which lost in the playoff finals in Seconda Divisione 2008-09 - Girone A
- Andria, which lost in the playoff semi-finals in Seconda Divisione 2008-09 - Girone C
- Viareggio, which lost in the playoff semi-finals in Seconda Divisione 2008-09 - Girone B

=== Exclusion of Potenza from the league ===
On 19 March 2010, after an investigation and a consequent trial at the Italian Football Federation, Federal Court of Justice, Potenza was found guilt of match-fixing involving a 2008 league match against Salernitana and was punished with immediate exclusion from the league. It was the first time in Italian professional football that a club was excluded from a league during the season for a corruption case. In April 1993 Unione Sportiva Arezzo was excluded from Serie C1 Girone A with still seven matches to go, but due to bankruptcy and subsequent failure of their license.

The verdict was however partly reverted on appeal later on 2 April, when the Tribunale Nazionale di Arbitrato per lo Sport (National Arbitration Court for Sports) admitted Potenza back to the league in order to allow the club complete the season; however the club will nevertheless appear as last-placed in the final table, regardless of the results from the coming games, thus forcing Potenza to play in the Lega Pro Seconda Divisione for the 2010–11 season.

== Girone A ==
=== Teams ===
| Club | City | Stadium | Capacity | 2008–09 season |
|---|---|---|---|---|
| U.S. Alessandria Calcio 1912 | Alessandria | Stadio Giuseppe Moccagatta | 8,182 | 2nd in Lega Pro Seconda Divisione A |
| A.C. Arezzo | Arezzo | Stadio Città di Arezzo | 15,128 | 4th in Lega Pro Prima Divisione B |
| Benevento Calcio | Benevento | Stadio Santa Colomba | 18,975 | 2nd in Lega Pro Prima Divisione B |
| Calcio Como | Como | Stadio Giuseppe Sinigaglia | 13,602 | 3rd in Lega Pro Seconda Divisione A |
| U.S. Cremonese | Cremona | Stadio Giovanni Zini | 20,034 | 9th in Lega Pro Prima Divisione A |
| A.S.C. Figline | Figline Valdarno | Stadio Goffredo Del Buffa | 1,700 | 1st in Lega Pro Seconda Divisione B |
| Foligno Calcio | Foligno | Stadio Enzo Blasone | 5,650 | 15th in Lega Pro Prima Divisione B |
| Calcio Lecco 1912 | Lecco | Stadio Rigamonti-Ceppi | 4,977 | 15th in Lega Pro Prima Divisione A |
| A.C. Lumezzane | Lumezzane | Nuovo Stadio Comunale | 4,150 | 10th in Lega Pro Prima Divisione A |
| A.C. Monza Brianza 1912 | Monza | Stadio Brianteo | 18,568 | 13th in Lega Pro Prima Divisione A |
| Novara Calcio | Novara | Stadio Silvio Piola | 10,106 | 8th in Lega Pro Prima Divisione A |
| Paganese Calcio 1926 | Pagani | Stadio Marcello Torre | 3,700 | 13th in Lega Pro Prima Divisione B |
| U.S. Pergocrema 1932 | Crema | Stadio Giuseppe Voltini | 4,095 | 11th in Lega Pro Prima Divisione A |
| Perugia Calcio | Perugia | Stadio Renato Curi | 28,000 | 7th in Lega Pro Prima Divisione A |
| Aurora Pro Patria 1919 | Busto Arsizio | Stadio Carlo Speroni | 4,000 | 2nd in Lega Pro Prima Divisione A |
| Sorrento Calcio | Sorrento | Stadio Italia | 3,600 | 10th in Lega Pro Prima Divisione B |
| A.S. Varese 1910 | Varese | Stadio Franco Ossola | 10,000 | 1st in Lega Pro Seconda Divisione A |
| F.C. Esperia Viareggio | Viareggio | Stadio dei Pini | 7,000 | 2nd in Lega Pro Seconda Divisione B |

=== League table ===
| Pos | Team | Pld | W | D | L | GF | GA | GD | Pts | Promotion or relegation |
|---|---|---|---|---|---|---|---|---|---|---|
| 1 | Novara (C, P) | 34 | 18 | 13 | 3 | 52 | 24 | +28 | 67 | Promotion to Serie B |
| 2 | Varese (P) | 34 | 17 | 11 | 6 | 53 | 34 | +19 | 62 | Promotion to Serie B |
| 3 | Cremonese | 34 | 16 | 13 | 5 | 62 | 47 | +15 | 61 | Qualification for Promotion play-off |
| 4 | Arezzo (R) | 34 | 17 | 10 | 7 | 54 | 35 | +19 | 61 | Relegation to Serie D (Note: Perugia and Arezzo declared bankrupt and relegated to Serie D.) |
| 5 | Benevento | 34 | 16 | 8 | 10 | 51 | 37 | +14 | 56 | Qualification for Promotion play-off |
| 6 | Lumezzane | 34 | 14 | 10 | 10 | 47 | 38 | +9 | 52 | |
| 7 | Figline (R) | 34 | 12 | 10 | 12 | 45 | 44 | +1 | 45 (Note: Figline and Perugia 1 point deduction due to financial irregularities.) | Relegation to Eccellenza (Note: Figline was excluded by Federal Council's decision. Entered Eccellenza) |
| 8 | Alessandria | 34 | 12 | 7 | 15 | 35 | 46 | −11 | 43 | |
| 9 | Sorrento | 34 | 10 | 11 | 13 | 44 | 45 | −1 | 41 | |
| 10 | Monza | 34 | 9 | 14 | 11 | 37 | 45 | −8 | 41 | |
| 11 | Perugia (R) | 34 | 12 | 6 | 16 | 31 | 38 | −7 | 41 | Relegation to Serie D |
| 12 | Como | 34 | 9 | 13 | 12 | 27 | 34 | −7 | 40 | |
| 13 | Foligno | 34 | 10 | 9 | 15 | 53 | 56 | −3 | 39 | |
| 14 | Viareggio | 34 | 8 | 14 | 12 | 29 | 39 | −10 | 38 | Qualification for Relegation play-off |
| 15 | Pergocrema | 34 | 9 | 9 | 16 | 35 | 43 | −8 | 36 | Qualification for Relegation play-off |
| 16 | Pro Patria (R) | 34 | 7 | 14 | 13 | 37 | 49 | −12 | 35 | Relegation to Seconda Divisione |
| 17 | Paganese (T) | 34 | 8 | 9 | 17 | 33 | 48 | −15 | 33 | Restored in Prima Divisione. |
| 18 | Lecco (R) | 34 | 8 | 7 | 19 | 34 | 53 | −19 | 31 | Relegation to Seconda Divisione |

Source: corrieredellosport.it
(C) Champions; (P) Promoted; (R) Relegated; (T) Qualified, but not yet for the particular phase indicated

== Play-offs ==
=== Promotion ===
Semifinals
First legs played 23 May 2010; return legs played 30 May 2010

| Team 1 | Agg. | Team 2 | 1st leg | 2nd leg |
|---|---|---|---|---|
| Benevento (5) | 3–4 | (2) Varese | 2–2 | 1–2 |
| Arezzo (4) | 2–3 | (3) Cremonese | 0–2 | 2–1 |

Final
First leg played 6 June 2010; return leg played 13 June 2010

| Team 1 | Agg. | Team 2 | 1st leg | 2nd leg |
|---|---|---|---|---|
| Cremonese (3) | 1–2 | (2) Varese | 1-0 | 0-2 |

Varese promoted to Serie B.

=== Relegation ===
First legs played 23 May 2010; return legs played 30 May 2010

| Team 1 | Agg. | Team 2 | 1st leg | 2nd leg |
|---|---|---|---|---|
| Paganese (17) | 2–2 | (14) Viareggio | 1–1 | 1–1 |
| Pro Patria (16) | 3–3 | (15) Pergocrema | 2–2 | 1–1 |

Paganese and Pro Patria relegated to Lega Pro Seconda Divisione.

=== Results ===
| Home \ Away | ALE | ARE | BEN | COM | CRE | FIG | FOL | LCO | LUM | MON | NOV | PAG | PRG | PRU | PPA | SOR | VAR | VIA |
|---|---|---|---|---|---|---|---|---|---|---|---|---|---|---|---|---|---|---|
| Alessandria | | 1–2 | 1–0 | 0–0 | 2–2 | 0–2 | 1–1 | 2–1 | 1–0 | 1–2 | 1–3 | 1–0 | 3–1 | 1–0 | 2–1 | 2–1 | 0–3 | 0–0 |
| Arezzo | 3–0 | | 1–0 | 2–3 | 2–2 | 3–2 | 3–1 | 1–0 | 2–2 | 1–0 | 2–1 | 2–0 | 3–1 | 1–1 | 1–1 | 2–0 | 1–0 | 1–1 |
| Benevento | 3–1 | 0–1 | | 1–1 | 1–3 | 1–0 | 2–0 | 2–1 | 2–1 | 3–0 | 1–0 | 3–0 | 0–1 | 3–1 | 1–1 | 3–0 | 1–0 | 2–2 |
| Como | 1–0 | 0–0 | 0–2 | | 0–1 | 0–2 | 2–2 | 2–0 | 2–1 | 1–1 | 0–2 | 3–1 | 1–1 | 0–1 | 0–0 | 2–1 | 1–1 | 1–1 |
| Cremonese | 1–1 | 5–1 | 1–0 | 1–0 | | 5–1 | 4–3 | 3–2 | 1–1 | 1–1 | 0–2 | 1–0 | 1–1 | 1–0 | 4–1 | 0–0 | 4–1 | 2–0 |
| Figline | 2–2 | 1–0 | 2–2 | 2–0 | 3–3 | | 4–2 | 2–2 | 1–0 | 2–0 | 0–2 | 2–0 | 1–0 | 2–1 | 2–1 | 1–0 | 1–1 | 1–2 |
| Foligno | 2–0 | 1–4 | 2–0 | 3–0 | 1–2 | 3–1 | | 2–3 | 0–1 | 1–1 | 1–1 | 3–1 | 2–0 | 1–2 | 1–1 | 1–0 | 1–1 | 4–2 |
| Lecco | 3–1 | 0–1 | 1–2 | 0–1 | 2–2 | 2–2 | 1–1 | | 1–2 | 0–0 | 1–1 | 2–1 | 2–1 | 1–0 | 2–0 | 1–0 | 0–2 | 0–0 |
| Lumezzane | 1–2 | 1–0 | 0–0 | 0–0 | 0–0 | 1–1 | 3–2 | 1–0 | | 3–0 | 1–4 | 2–0 | 2–0 | 1–0 | 1–1 | 1–0 | 2–0 | 1–0 |
| Monza | 0–1 | 1–6 | 1–1 | 0–1 | 3–0 | 2–2 | 2–1 | 2–1 | 2–1 | | 1–1 | 0–2 | 1–1 | 0–0 | 2–0 | 3–4 | 3–1 | 1–0 |
| Novara | 1–0 | 0–0 | 2–0 | 1–1 | 3–3 | 1–0 | 2–0 | 3–0 | 3–2 | 1–1 | | 0–1 | 2–0 | 2–1 | 1–1 | 2–1 | 1–1 | 1–1 |
| Paganese | 3–1 | 1–1 | 2–1 | 1–3 | 1–3 | 0–0 | 2–2 | 1–0 | 2–2 | 1–1 | 1–2 | | 3–0 | 2–0 | 0–0 | 2–1 | 0–0 | 0–0 |
| Pergocrema | 1–2 | 3–4 | 1–2 | 1–0 | 0–1 | 1–0 | 2–2 | 4–0 | 1–2 | 2–1 | 1–1 | 1–0 | | 1–1 | 1–1 | 1–1 | 2–0 | 2–0 |
| Perugia | 2–1 | 0–0 | 1–2 | 3–1 | 4–0 | 1–0 | 0–2 | 2–1 | 0–2 | 2–1 | 0–2 | 2–1 | 1–0 | | 2–1 | 0–1 | 1–1 | 1–0 |
| Pro Patria | 1–0 | 1–1 | 3–4 | 1–0 | 2–2 | 2–2 | 4–2 | 0–2 | 2–1 | 0–0 | 0–1 | 2–1 | 1–2 | 2–0 | | 2–2 | 1–1 | 1–0 |
| Sorrento | 2–2 | 3–2 | 3–2 | 0–0 | 2–1 | 2–1 | 2–1 | 4–0 | 2–2 | 1–2 | 0–2 | 1–1 | 0–0 | 1–1 | 3–0 | | 1–1 | 2–2 |
| Varese | 1–0 | 1–0 | 1–1 | 1–0 | 5–1 | 1–0 | 2–0 | 1–0 | 4–2 | 2–2 | 1–1 | 5–2 | 2–1 | 2–0 | 3–1 | 2–1 | | 4–2 |
| Viareggio | 0–2 | 1–0 | 2–2 | 0–0 | 1–1 | 1–0 | 0–2 | 4–2 | 2–2 | 0–0 | 0–0 | 1–0 | 1–0 | 1–0 | 2–1 | 0–2 | 0–1 | |

Source: http://www.gazzetta.it/speciali/risultati_classifiche/2010/calcio/serie-c1/gironea/index.shtml
Legend: Blue = home team win; Yellow = draw; Red = away team win.

== Girone B ==
=== Teams ===
| Club | City | Stadium | Capacity | 2008–09 season |
|---|---|---|---|---|
| A.S. Andria BAT | Andria | Stadio degli Ulivi | 24,000 | 5th in Lega Pro Seconda Divisione C |
| S.S. Cavese 1919 | Cava de' Tirreni | Stadio Simonetta Lamberti | 16,000 | 6th in Lega Pro Prima Divisione B |
| Cosenza Calcio 1914 | Cosenza | Stadio San Vito | 24,000 | 1st in Lega Pro Seconda Divisione C |
| U.S. Foggia | Foggia | Stadio Pino Zaccheria | 25,000 | 5th in Lega Pro Prima Divisione B |
| Giulianova Calcio | Giulianova | Stadio Rubens Fadini | 5,625 | 3rd in Lega Pro Seconda Divisione B |
| Delfino Pescara 1936 | Pescara | Stadio Adriatico | 22,260 | 11th in Lega Pro Prima Divisione B |
| A.S. Pescina Valle del Giovenco | Avezzano | Stadio dei Marsi | 4,500 | 4th in Lega Pro Seconda Divisione C |
| Calcio Portogruaro Summaga | Portogruaro | Stadio Pier Giovanni Mecchia | 3,335 | 12th in Lega Pro Prima Divisione A |
| Potenza S.C. | Potenza | Stadio Alfredo Viviani | 6,000 | 18th in Lega Pro Prima Divisione B |
| Ravenna Calcio | Ravenna | Stadio Bruno Benelli | 12,020 | 3rd in Lega Pro Prima Divisione A |
| Real Marcianise Calcio | Marcianise | Stadio Progreditur | 3,000 | 8th in Lega Pro Prima Divisione B |
| A.C. Reggiana 1919 | Reggio Emilia | Stadio Giglio | 14,138 | 5th in Lega Pro Prima Divisione A |
| Rimini Calcio F.C. | Rimini | Stadio Romeo Neri | 9,768 | 18th in Serie B |
| SPAL 1907 | Ferrara | Stadio Paolo Mazza | 19,000 | 6th in Lega Pro Prima Divisione A |
| Taranto Sport | Taranto | Stadio Erasmo Iacovone | 28,000 | 12th in Lega Pro Prima Divisione B |
| Ternana Calcio | Terni | Stadio Libero Liberati | 22,000 | 9th in Lega Pro Prima Divisione B |
| Hellas Verona F.C. | Verona | Stadio Marc'Antonio Bentegodi | 39,211 | 7th in Lega Pro Prima Divisione A |
| S.S. Virtus Lanciano 1924 | Lanciano | Stadio Guido Biondi | 8,000 | 14th in Lega Pro Prima Divisione B |

=== League table ===
| Pos | Team | Pld | W | D | L | GF | GA | GD | Pts | Promotion or relegation |
|---|---|---|---|---|---|---|---|---|---|---|
| 1 | Portogruaro (C, P) | 34 | 16 | 11 | 7 | 39 | 26 | +13 | 59 | Promotion to Serie B |
| 2 | Pescara (P) | 34 | 15 | 13 | 6 | 39 | 25 | +14 | 58 | Promotion to Serie B |
| 3 | Hellas Verona | 34 | 13 | 16 | 5 | 38 | 20 | +18 | 55 | Qualification for Promotion play-off |
| 4 | Rimini (R) | 34 | 15 | 6 | 13 | 39 | 36 | +3 | 51 | Relegation to Serie D (Note: Rimini declared bankrupt and relegated to Serie D.) |
| 5 | Reggiana | 34 | 13 | 10 | 11 | 45 | 38 | +7 | 49 | Qualification for Promotion play-off |
| 6 | Ternana | 34 | 14 | 7 | 13 | 34 | 34 | 0 | 49 | |
| 7 | SPAL | 34 | 10 | 15 | 9 | 37 | 29 | +8 | 45 | |
| 8 | Taranto | 34 | 10 | 15 | 9 | 26 | 24 | +2 | 45 | |
| 9 | Virtus Lanciano | 34 | 9 | 17 | 8 | 31 | 36 | −5 | 44 | |
| 10 | Cavese | 34 | 9 | 16 | 9 | 25 | 25 | 0 | 43 | |
| 11 | Cosenza | 34 | 10 | 13 | 11 | 43 | 45 | −2 | 43 | |
| 12 | Real Marcianise (R) | 34 | 11 | 11 | 12 | 44 | 40 | +4 | 43 | Excluded from professional football after bankruptcy (Note: Real Marcianise declared bankrupt. Although the highest level they can join is Eccellenza, they have not registered for a league and their future is in doubt.) |
| 13 | Ravenna | 34 | 9 | 13 | 12 | 38 | 36 | +2 | 40 | |
| 14 | Andria BAT | 34 | 9 | 13 | 12 | 31 | 35 | −4 | 40 | Qualification for Relegation play-off |
| 15 | Foggia | 34 | 9 | 14 | 11 | 27 | 37 | −10 | 40 (Note: Foggia had 1 point deduction due to financial irregularities.) | Qualification for Relegation play-off |
| 16 | Pescina V.d.G. (R) | 34 | 8 | 10 | 16 | 32 | 49 | −17 | 34 | Excluded from professional football after bankruptcy (Note: Pescina declared bankrupt and folded at the end of the season.) |
| 17 | Giulianova (R) | 34 | 6 | 14 | 14 | 28 | 42 | −14 | 32 | Relegation to Seconda Divisione |
| 18 | Potenza (R) | 34 | 8 | 10 | 16 | 30 | 48 | −18 | 34 (Note: Excluded from the league on March 20, 2010, with seven matches still to play. Readmitted to championship on April 1, 2010, but the team, although playing the remaining seven matches, will be ranked 18th at the end of the season and will be relegated to Lega Pro II Divisione.) | Relegation to Eccellenza (Note: Potenza declared bankrupt and relegated to Eccellenza.) |

Source: corrieredellosport.it
(C) Champions; (P) Promoted; (R) Relegated

=== Promotion Playoffs ===
Semifinals
First legs played 23 May 2010; return legs played 30 May 2010

| Team 1 | Agg. | Team 2 | 1st leg | 2nd leg |
|---|---|---|---|---|
| Reggiana (5) | 0-2 | (2) Pescara | 0–0 | 0–2 |
| Rimini (4) | 0-1 | (3) Verona | 0–1 | 0-0 |

Final
First leg played 6 June 2010; return leg played 13 June 2010

| Team 1 | Agg. | Team 2 | 1st leg | 2nd leg |
|---|---|---|---|---|
| Verona (3) | 2–3 | (2) Pescara | 2-2 | 0-1 |

Pescara promoted to Serie B.

=== Relegation ===
First legs played 23 May 2010; return legs played 30 May 2010

| Team 1 | Agg. | Team 2 | 1st leg | 2nd leg |
|---|---|---|---|---|
| Giulianova (18) | 1–2 | (14) Andria BAT | 1–1 | 0–1 |
| Pescina (16) | 3–3 | (15) Foggia | 1–2 | 2–1 |

Giulianova and Pescina relegated to Lega Pro Seconda Divisione.

=== Results ===
| Home \ Away | AND | CAV | COS | FOG | GIU | PES | PVG | POR | POT | RAV | RMA | REA | RIM | SPA | TAR | TER | HEL | VLN |
|---|---|---|---|---|---|---|---|---|---|---|---|---|---|---|---|---|---|---|
| Andria BAT | | 1–0 | 1–0 | 0–1 | 1–1 | 1–1 | 3–0 | 1–0 | 3–1 | 0–0 | 0–1 | 1–1 | 1–0 | 0–0 | 2–1 | 0–1 | 0–0 | 2–0 |
| Cavese | 1–1 | | 1–1 | 0–0 | 2–2 | 1–1 | 2–1 | 1–2 | 0–1 | 1–0 | 1–0 | 2–0 | 1–0 | 2–2 | 1–0 | 1–0 | 0–0 | 0–2 |
| Cosenza | 1–1 | 0–0 | | 4–0 | 3–4 | 2–1 | 1–1 | 3–2 | 0–2 | 2–2 | 1–1 | 1–1 | 0–3 | 3–1 | 0–1 | 1–0 | 0–0 | 0–0 |
| Foggia | 0–2 | 0–0 | 1–3 | | 1–1 | 1–0 | 2–0 | 2–1 | 1–1 | 1–2 | 1–3 | 2–1 | 3–0 | 0–3 | 0–0 | 1–2 | 0–1 | 0–0 |
| Giulianova | 1–1 | 0–2 | 1–2 | 1–2 | | 1–1 | 0–0 | 2–1 | 1–0 | 2–2 | 0–0 | 1–0 | 0–2 | 1–1 | 0–0 | 1–1 | 0–0 | 2–2 |
| Pescara | 1–0 | 1–2 | 3–1 | 0–0 | 1–0 | | 1–0 | 0–1 | 2–1 | 2–1 | 2–0 | 3–0 | 2–0 | 1–0 | 1–1 | 2–1 | 0–0 | 0–0 |
| Pescina V.d.G. | 1–1 | 0–0 | 1–3 | 2–0 | 1–2 | 0–2 | | 0–1 | 3–2 | 2–1 | 3–3 | 2–1 | 2–0 | 0–3 | 0–2 | 3–0 | 1–1 | 1–0 |
| Portogruaro | 0–0 | 0–0 | 1–1 | 1–1 | 2–0 | 2–2 | 0–0 | | 1–0 | 0–1 | 0–0 | 2–1 | 2–1 | 1–0 | 1–0 | 1–2 | 0–0 | 1–1 |
| Potenza | 3–1 | 1–0 | 0–2 | 2–1 | 2–1 | 0–0 | 1–0 | 0–3 | | 1–1 | 0–2 | 0–0 | 2–1 | 2–2 | 0–0 | 1–1 | 0–2 | 0–2 |
| Ravenna | 3–1 | 2–2 | 3–1 | 0–0 | 2–0 | 1–1 | 3–1 | 1–1 | 2–1 | | 1–1 | 3–1 | 1–2 | 1–1 | 1–1 | 0–1 | 0–1 | 0–1 |
| Real Marcianise | 3–0 | 0–0 | 1–1 | 0–0 | 1–2 | 2–3 | 0–2 | 1–2 | 3–0 | 0–1 | | 1–3 | 1–1 | 1–0 | 3–3 | 4–0 | 1–0 | 2–2 |
| Reggiana | 1–1 | 1–0 | 5–2 | 3–4 | 1–0 | 2–1 | 2–0 | 0–1 | 2–1 | 2–2 | 3–1 | | 3–1 | 0–1 | 0–0 | 1–0 | 0–0 | 0–1 |
| Rimini | 2–1 | 1–0 | 2–0 | 0–1 | 2–1 | 0–0 | 3–1 | 2–3 | 2–0 | 1–0 | 1–0 | 1–1 | | 1–1 | 2–0 | 1–1 | 3–2 | 0–0 |
| SPAL | 2–0 | 2–0 | 1–1 | 0–0 | 2–0 | 0–1 | 0–0 | 2–1 | 1–1 | 0–0 | 2–3 | 1–1 | 1–2 | | 0–0 | 0–1 | 1–1 | 0–1 |
| Taranto | 1–0 | 1–0 | 2–1 | 0–0 | 0–0 | 0–1 | 2–0 | 1–2 | 2–2 | 1–0 | 1–0 | 0–0 | 1–0 | 0–2 | | 1–0 | 0–0 | 1–1 |
| Ternana | 2–1 | 1–1 | 0–0 | 4–1 | 2–0 | 2–0 | 0–2 | 1–0 | 3–0 | 1–0 | 0–3 | 0–1 | 3–0 | 0–1 | 2–1 | | 0–2 | 1–1 |
| Hellas Verona | 3–1 | 1–1 | 2–1 | 0–0 | 1–0 | 0–0 | 5–1 | 0–1 | 2–2 | 2–1 | 2–0 | 1–2 | 0–1 | 1–1 | 1–0 | 2–0 | | 2–2 |
| Virtus Lanciano | 2–2 | 0–0 | 0–1 | 0–0 | 2–0 | 2–2 | 1–1 | 0–2 | 1–0 | 1–0 | 1–2 | 1–5 | 1–0 | 1–3 | 1–1 | 0–2 | 0–3 | |

Source: http://www.gazzetta.it/speciali/risultati_classifiche/2010/calcio/serie-c1/gironeb/index.shtml
Legend: Blue = home team win; Yellow = draw; Red = away team win.
