= Atletico Roma FC =

Italian football club

Atletico Roma F.C.
- Full name: Atletico Roma Football Club
Founded
| 1968 | (GS Collatino) |
| 2001 | (Cisco Collatino) |
| 2003 | (Collatino merged with Bufalotta; forming Cisco Roma) |
| 2004 | (Cisco Roma merged with A.S. Lodigiani; forming Cisco Lodigiani) |
| 2005 | (back to Cisco Roma) |
| 2010 | (Atletico Roma) |
- Dissolved: 2011; 14 years ago
- Ground: Stadio Flaminio
- Capacity: 32,000
| Home colours | Away colours |

Atletico Roma Football Club was an Italian football club based in Rome, Italy. The club was founded as Nuova Tor Sapienza Calcio, which was renamed to Cisco Tor Sapienza in 1998. Under several merger, the club was subsequent known as A.S. Cisco Collatino, A.S. Cisco Calcio Roma (2003–04, 2005–2010) and A.S. Cisco Lodigiani (2004–05). The club also played in Serie C (Lega Pro Prima Divisione) from 2005 to 2011. In 2010–11 season the club was known as Atletico Roma F.C.. Several clubs were founded as namesakes to homage either Atletico Roma or Cisco Collatino after 2010 and 2011, the year of disestablishment of the original Cisco Roma and Atletico Roma respectively.

== History ==
=== A.S. Cisco Collatino ===
A.S. Cisco Collatino was an Italian football club, formerly known as Cisco Tor Sapienza. The club was the namesake of Collatino quarter of Rome as well as Tor Sapienza zone of Rome. Cisco Tor Sapienza was acquired by Cisco Italia group in 1998. Before the acquisition, the club was known as Nuova Tor Sapienza Calcio.

Cisco Collatino won 2001–02 Eccellenza Lazio in mid-2002 and promoted to 2002–03 Serie D.

In 2003 Cisco Collatino merged with a smaller club and renamed to Cisco Calcio Roma.

After the 2003 merger, there were namesakes G.S. Cisco Collatino A.S.D. which was a youth academy, as well as a five-a-side football club Cisco Collatino Futsal.

=== A.S. Cisco Calcio Roma (2003–04) ===
A.S. Cisco Calcio Roma was an Italian football club. It was founded in 2003 by a merger of A.S. Cisco Collatino and A.Pol. Bufalotta. The latter was a namesake of Bufalotta area of Rome. The club finished as the 10th in 2003–04 Serie D Group F.

In 2004, Cisco Calcio Roma merged with A.S. Lodigiani. Despite A.S. Lodigiani was the surviving legal entity, Cisco Calcio Roma was the surviving brand.

=== A.S. Cisco Lodigiani (2004–05) ===
A.S. Cisco Lodigiani was formed in 2004 by a merger of two clubs that were owned by Tulli family of Cisco Italia group. Cisco Calcio Roma and A.S. Lodigiani respectively. Lodigiani was bought by Cisco Italia group in 2003.

In precise, the license of A.S. Lodigiani was renamed to A.S. Cisco Lodigiani in 2004, which was reverted to Cisco Calcio Roma in 2005. While the license of A.S. Cisco Calcio Roma was sold in 2004, to become A.S.D. Frascati Calcio, which became Lupa Frascati in 2006.

The shuffles made the disappearance of Lodigiani, while Cisco achieved a "promotion" to the professional league, while Lupa Frascati avoided relegation from Serie D, as well as the creation of U.S.D. Tor di Quinto by using the license of the old Lupa Frascati.

=== A.S. Cisco Calcio Roma (2005–2010) ===
In 2005, Cisco Lodigiani was reverted to the previous name of one of the predecessors, Cisco Calcio Roma. The short name was Cisco Roma.

Cisco Roma played from 2005–06 to 2009–10 in Lega Pro Seconda Divisione (ex-Serie C2), although it started the 2006-07 Serie C2 season with great ambitions of promotion, after signing former West Ham and Lazio star Paolo Di Canio: it finished 2nd in Serie C2 Group C, but lost to Reggiana in the promotion playoffs semifinals. In 2007, Di Canio was joined by then international Maltese striker Daniel Bogdanović.

On 11 June 2009 it was bought by Mario and Davide Ciaccia which immediately relaunch the team that in fact at the end of the 2009-10 Lega Pro Seconda Divisione season, was promoted to Prima Divisione as play-off winners.

=== Atletico Roma F.C. (2010–11) ===
On 7 July 2010, the club changed its name to Atletico Roma F.C. and its colours to blue and white, to distance itself from Lodigiani's history and abandon a corporate name, as both Lodigiani and Cisco are firms based in Rome.

On 18 July 2011 Atletico Roma F.C. was excluded from Lega Pro Prima Divisione by the decision of the Federal Council of Italian Football Federation.

== Colour and badge ==
Former Cisco Calcio logo, c. 2005–2007

Former Cisco Roma logo, c. 2007–2010

The team's colors were red and white in A.S. Cisco Calcio Roma era. It was changed to blue and white in 2010–11 season in the Atletico Roma F.C. era.

In A.S. Cisco Calcio Roma era, the club used a logo that resembled to A.S. Lodigiani. In the second version of the logo, it featured a tiger and 1972, the year of foundation of A.S. Lodigiani. In Atletico Roma F.C. era, the club still retained the year 1972 in the logo.

Cisco Collatino Futsal, a namesake of Cisco Roma's predecessor Cisco Collatino, used the same tiger logo, but with its own club name and year 1968 on it.

== Season-by-season record ==
| Season | Division | Level | Position | Notes |
|---|---|---|---|---|
| 2005–06 | Serie C2, Gr. C | 4 | 6th | |
| 2006–07 | Serie C2, Gr. B | 4 | 2nd | Lost in C2/B Semifinals |
| 2007–08 | Serie C2, Gr. C | 4 | 9th | |
| 2008–09 | Lega Pro Seconda Divisione, Gr. B | 4 | 6th | |
| 2009–10 | Lega Pro Seconda Divisione, Gr. C | 4 | 3rd | Won Group C Promotion |
| 2010–11 | Lega Pro Prima Divisione, Gr. B | 3 | 3rd | Disbanded |

== Namesakes ==
A.S.D. Cisco Collatino Futsal, homage to the original A.S. Cisco Collatino, as of 2018–19 season still active as a youth academy, women's football club and 5-a-side (futsal), 7-a-side, 8-a-side football club. That club has a FIGC registration number 934,859. In an interview, Mario Ricca, the Director of Sport of the club, had revealed that Cisco Collatino Futsal was affiliated to Torino from 2015. Cisco Collatino Futsal finished as the 6th of 2011–12 5-a-side Serie D Rome Group D. Cisco Collatino Futsal was founded circa 2011.

There was another namesake, Gruppo Sportivo Cisco Collatino A.S.D., which the FIGC registration number was 916,287. The club was deregistered as a member of Italian Football Federation (FIGC) in 2006. The legal person of G.S. Cisco Collatino A.S.D. was incorporated in September 1994. The sports club also affiliated to Italian National Olympic Committee (CONI) in 2013 as a member of Unione Sportiva ACLI.

Another namesake, A.S.D. Real Cisco Collatino, was a spin off of A.S.D. Res Roma in 2010. Real Cisco Collatino participated in 2010–11 Prima Categoria Lazio. The club relegated as the last of group D. The registration number of that club was 932,247. That club became Real 100Celle in 2011–12 season.

In 2017, a minor club from Rome was renamed from S.S.D. Atletico Calcio Roma to A.S.D. Atletico Roma. The registration number of that club was 934,725. The club finished as the 6th of 2017–18 Prima Categoria Lazio Group C. That club was renamed to A.S.D. Tor Lupara 1968 in 2018. Atletico Calcio Roma was known as A.S.D. Atletico Torrenova before 2013.
