= Rovigo Calcio =

Italian football club

Rovigo
- Full name: Rovigo Calcio Srl
- Founded: 1893; 132 years ago 2012; 13 years ago (refounded)
- Ground: Stadio Francesco Gabrielli, Rovigo, Italy
- Capacity: 3,200
- 2012–13: Eccelenza Veneto-A, 5th
| Home colours | Away colours |

Rovigo Calcio is an Italian association football club from Rovigo, Veneto.

== History ==
The club was founded in 1893.

In the 2005–06 season of Serie D, Rovigo finished first in Girone D, winning direct promotion to Serie C2, returning to a professional league for the first time in 56 years.

In the 2006–07 season of Serie C2, the team finished 6th in Girone B, missing by 2 points the chance to participate in the promotional playoffs.

In the 2007–08 season of Serie C2, Rovigo finished 16th in Girone B, and was forced to play in the relegation playoffs. Being the lower classified team, Rovigo was relegated to Serie D after its two-legged tie with 15th-placed Castelnuovo ended in a 3–3 aggregate draw. However, the team was chosen to remain in Serie C2, now called Lega Pro Seconda Divisione, to fill one of nine vacancies.

In the 2008–09 season of Lega Pro Seconda Divisione, Rovigo finished 18th and last in Girone B, and was directly relegated to Serie D.

In summer 2011 it does not appeal against the exclusion of Covisod from Serie D and so was excluded from all football. In 2012 Lape Ceregnano of Ceregnano transferred to Rovigo and assumed the name A.S.D. Rovigo L.P.C.
