= Stadio Fratelli Paschiero =

Stadium in Cuneo, Italy

Coordinates: 44°22′59.3″N 7°32′02.3″E

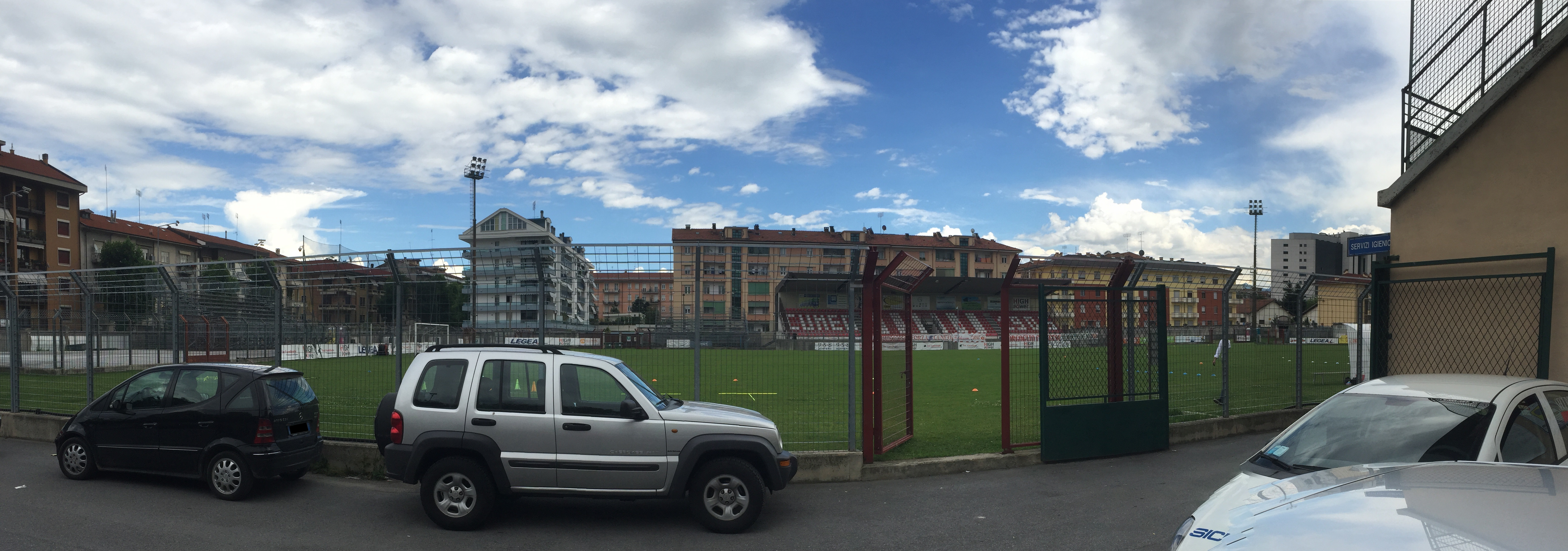
- Interactive map of Stadio Fratelli Paschiero
- Location: Cuneo, Italy
- Owner: Comune of Cuneo
- Capacity: 3,060
- Surface: Grass

Construction
- Opened: 1935
- Renovated: 1990, 2011, 2012

Tenant
- Cuneo

Stadio Fratelli Paschiero is a multi-use stadium in Cuneo, Italy. It is currently used mostly for football matches and is the home ground of Cuneo. The stadium holds 3,060.
