= AC Mezzocorona =

Italian football club

- Full name: Associazione Calcio Mezzocorona
- Founded: 1951; 1967 (refounded)
- Ground: Stadio Comunale, Mezzocorona, Italy
- Capacity: 1,500
- Manager: Flavio Toccoli
- League: Promozione Trentino A
- 2019–20: Promozione Trentino A, 12th
Home colours	Away colours

A.C. Mezzocorona is an Italian association football club located in Mezzocorona, Trentino. Currently it plays in Promozione.

== History ==
Founded in 1951 and refounded in 1967, Mezzocorona played in the amateur ties of Italian football until 2007, after finishing first in the Girone C during the Serie D 2006-07, thus winning promotion for the first time ever to Serie C2, the fourth tier of Italian football. As one of the nine promoted teams from Serie D, Mezzocorona also participated in the Scudetto Dilettanti tournament but was eliminated in the group stage.

=== Lega Pro Seconda Divisione ===
In the Serie C2 2007-08 regular season, Mezzocorona finished a surprising fifth in Girone A, and qualified for the promotional playoffs. The team upset second-placed Carpenedolo in the semi-finals, winning 2–1 on aggregate. In the finals, the team lost to fourth-placed Lumezzane due to the fact it was the lower classified team after the pair ended in a 0–0 aggregate tie, thus remaining in the, now called, Lega Pro Seconda Divisione.

After four consecutive season in the Lega Pro Seconda Divisione, including one in former Serie C2, Mezzocorona was relegated to Serie D at the end of the 2010–11 Lega Pro Seconda Divisione season.

The club was disbanded in 2017, then resuming activities from the minor amateur leagues.

== Colors and badge ==
Its official colours are green and yellow.
