= Stadio Aragona =

Coordinates: 42°6′28″N 14°42′20″E

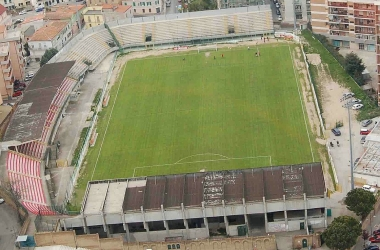
- Interactive map of Stadio Aragona
- Location: Vasto, Italy
- Owner: Municipality of Vasto
- Capacity: 5,000
- Surface: Grass

Tenant
- F.C. Pro Vasto (Serie C2)

The Stadio Aragona is a football stadium in Vasto, Italy. It is the home stadium of F.C. Pro Vasto.
