= FC Carpenedolo SSD =

Italian football club

Carpenedolo
- Full name: Football Club Carpenedolo; Società Sportiva Dilettantistica
- Nickname: I Rossoneri
- Founded: 1957; 69 years ago as, Unione Sportiva Carpenedolo; 2012; 14 years ago as, Football Club Atletico Montichiari; 2012; 14 years ago as, Atletico Carpenedolo; 2020; 6 years ago as, Football Club Carpenedolo S.S.D. 2026; 0 years ago as, Carpenedolo BSV Garda
- Ground: Stadio Mundial '82, Carpenedolo, Italy
- Capacity: 3,000
- Chairman: Stefano Pedrini
- Manager: Daniele Fregoni
- League: Eccellenza Lombardy/C
- 2021–22: Eccellenza Lombardy/C, 6th

F.C. Carpenedolo S.S.D., commonly known as Carpenedolo, is an Italian association football club, based in Carpenedolo, Lombardy. Formed in 1957, it is now known as Carpenedolo BSV Garda.

== History ==
In the Serie C2 2007–08 regular season, Carpenedolo finished second in Girone A, and qualified for the promotion playoffs. The team was defeated by fifth-placed Mezzocorona in the semi-finals, 2–1 on aggregate, thus remaining in the 4th level of Italian Football, now called Lega Pro Seconda Divisione for the 2008–09 season.

At the end of the 2009-10 Lega Pro Seconda Divisione season, the club was relegated to Serie D.

It in the season 2010–11, from Serie D group D relegated, in the play-out, to Eccellenza Lombardy, but August 5, 2011, it was later readmitted to Serie D to fill vacancies.

In 2012 the sports title of the club was moved to Montichiari as F.C. Atletico Montichiari, in order to be a spiritual successor of A.C. Montichiari. The club's logo and football history was then acquired by a new club, restarting from youth football as Atletico Carpenedolo. The club then rejoined senior football in 2018 from Terza Categoria and then acquired the sports title of Sporting Desenzano, being renamed F.C. Carpenedolo S.S.D..
