= Stadio Mariotti =

Football arena in Alghero, Sardinia, Italy

Coordinates: 40°33′50″N 8°19′29″E

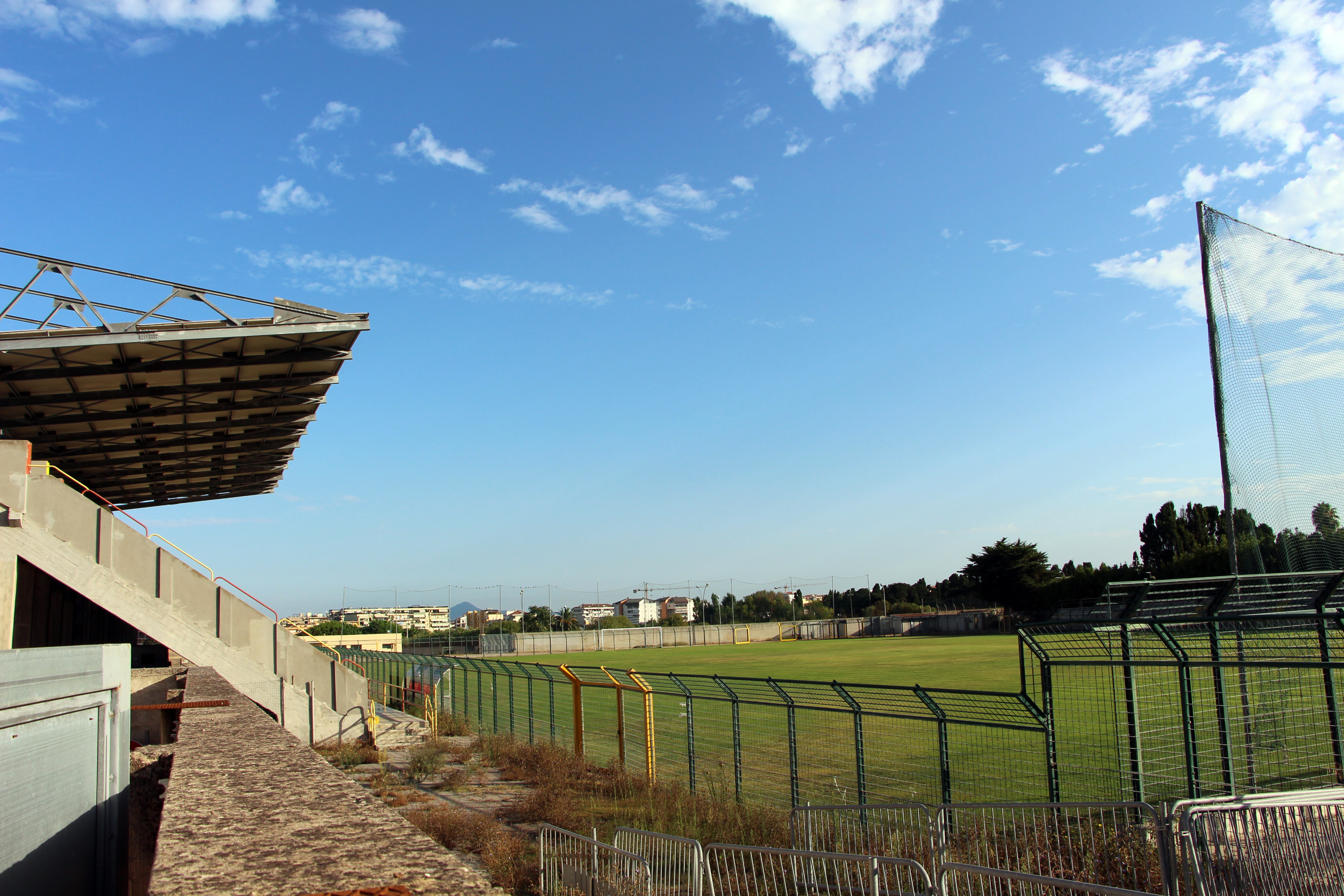
- Interactive map of Stadio Mariotti
- Location: Alghero, Sardinia (Italy)
- Capacity: 2,815

Tenant
- Polisportiva Alghero

Stadio Mariotti is an arena in Alghero, Sardinia (Italy). It is primarily used for football, and is the home to the Polisportiva Alghero of the Eccellenza Sardinia. The stadium has a capacity of 2,815 spectators.
