= US Castelnuovo Garfagnana SCSD =

Italian football club

U.S. Castelnuovo Garfagnana
- Full name: Unione Sportiva; Castelnuovo Garfagnana; Società Cooperativa Sportiva Dilettantistica
- Nickname: Gialloblu (Yellowblues)
- Founded: 1 January 1922; 103 years ago
- Ground: Stadio Alessio Nardini, Castelnuovo di Garfagnana, Italy
- Capacity: 1,850
- Chairman: Alessandro Vichi
- Manager: Luigi Grassi
- League: Eccellenza Tuscany A
- 2024-25: Eccellenza Tuscany A, 5th
- Website: https://www.uscastelnuovo.it
Home colours	Away colours

Unione Sportiva Castelnuovo Garfagnana is an Italian association football club, based in Castelnuovo di Garfagnana, Tuscany. The club was founded in 1922.

Formerly a professional club who last played in Serie C2/B in the 2007–08 season, they are currently playing in the amateur Eccellenza regional league, corresponding to the fifth level of the italian football pyramid.

The team's colors are dark blue and yellow.

== History ==
First founded in 1922, Castelnuovo played Serie C2 from 1999–2000 to 2007–2008, after winning promotion from Serie D in 1998–1999. In 1999–2000, Castelnuovo gained a surprising third place, and qualified for the promotional playoffs, losing 2–1 (on aggregate) in the semifinal round to Prato. In 2002–2003, with a fourth place in the final table, Castelnuovo again qualified for the promotion playoffs, but again lost in the semifinal round; 5–2 on aggregate to Gubbio.

The 2007–08 season saw Castelnuovo finish in 15th place, forcing it to play in the relegation playouts against Rovigo, where it won after a 3–3 aggregate score (higher classified teams are considered the winners on aggregate ties). Although it escaped relegation to Serie D, the club was liquidated on 30 June 2008 due to financial troubles, and restarted from the Eccellenza league.
