= Bassano Virtus 55 ST =

Italian football club

Bassano Virtus
- Full name: Bassano Virtus 55 Soccer Team
- Nickname(s): Giallorossi (yellow-reds)
- Founded: 31 May 1920; 104 years ago as U.S. Bassano; 1968; 57 years ago (refounded)
- Dissolved: 2018 (merged with Vicenza)
- Ground: Stadio Rino Mercante
- Capacity: 2,952
- Owner: Renzo Rosso
- Chairman: Stefano Rosso
- 2017–18: Serie C (group B), 8th
- Website: http://www.bassanovirtus.com/
Home colours	Away colours

Bassano Virtus 55 Soccer Team S.p.A., commonly known as Bassano Virtus or just Bassano is a football club based in Bassano del Grappa, Veneto. The first team of the club was relocated to Vicenza in 2018 as L.R. Vicenza Virtus, while the youth system of Bassano Virtus was retained in Bassano del Grappa along with Vicenza Calcio's was retained in Vicenza.

== History ==
=== Foundation ===
Bassano Virtus 55 Soccer Team was founded in 1920 as U.S. Bassano (Unione Sportiva Bassano) and merged with cross-city rivals A.C. Virtus in 1968. In 1996 the club took its current name: the number 55 stands for 1955, owner Renzo Rosso's birthyear. Nowadays, Bassano Virtus is also the only Italian professional football club to use soccer instead of football in its full name.

=== Serie C2 and Lega Pro Seconda Divisione ===
In the 2005–06 season the club debuted in Serie C2, but after suffering a defeat in Montichiari in the last match, they finished only 12th.

In the 2006–07 Serie C2 season the club reached the playoffs, but was defeated by Calcio Lecco 1912, which was later promoted to Serie C1.

In their third consecutive season in Serie C2 (now renamed Lega Pro Seconda Divisione), Bassano had an excellent start: the club peaked the league after 5 days and kept the position in isolation until the 23rd day, thanks to a series of eight consecutive wins. The attacking tactics of coach Ezio Gelerean led the team a step away from promotion: with only 4 matches left, the club is first, 3 points ahead of runners-up Reggiana. In the end of the season Bassano Virtus was surpassed by Reggiana and later lost the promotion play-off final with Portogruaro (2–3 in Portogruaro and 1–2 in Bassano del Grappa) also due to a penalty not granted to Bassano, that could have changed the outcame of the match. However, the club was able to win Coppa Italia Lega Pro by defeating Benevento Calcio with the overwhelming result of 5–0.

=== Lega Pro Prima Divisione ===
At the end of 2009–10 Lega Pro Seconda Divisione season, the club obtained the repechage in Lega Pro Prima Divisione, given the number of teams in financial difficulty.

=== Lega Pro Seconda Divisione ===
Bassano in the season 2011–12 was relegated from Lega Pro Prima Divisione to Lega Pro Seconda Divisione. In 2013–14 season the club promoted as champions of Group A of Seconda Divisione. At the end of season also saw the merger of the two divisions of Lega Pro, as well as reduction of 69 to 60 teams. In 2013–14 Seconda Divisione season already saw re-admission of 2 teams that originally relegated, as well as 4 additional teams from Serie D.

=== Serie C ===
Bassano was among the original 60 teams in Serie C since its reestablishment in 2014. On 24 May 2018, after the bankruptcy of the main football team of the province of Vicenza, Vicenza Calcio, Stefano Rosso, the chairman of Bassano Virtus, announced that the first team of Bassano Virtus would started to play in Vicenza in 2018–19 Serie C in the color of Vicenza, as L.R. Vicenza Virtus, while keeping both the youth systems of Bassano and Vicenza.

== Phoenix club ==
It was reported that another club, Football Club Bassano 1903, was founded in 2018 as a phoenix club, after the original club Bassano Virtus 55 Soccer Team had moved to Vicenza.

== Ownership ==
The team was owned by Renzo Rosso, the president of OTB Group (the parent company of Diesel, Maison Margiela, Marni, Paula Cademartori, Viktor & Rolf, Staff International and Brave Kid).

== Honours ==
Bassano Virtus 55 S.T. honours
Type	Competition	Titles	Seasons/Years
Domestic	Serie D	1	2004–05
Domestic	Coppa Italia Lega Pro	1	2007–08

== Current technical staff ==
Position	Name
Head coach	(Italy) Giuseppe Magi
Goalkeeping coach	(Italy) Marco Zuccher
