= ASD Progreditur Marcianise =

Italian football club

Progreditur Marcianise
- Full name: Associazione Sportiva Dilettantistica Progreditur Marcianise
- Founded: 1951; 2011 (refounded)
- Dissolved: 2016
- Ground: Stadio Progreditur, Marcianise, Italy
- Capacity: 4,550
- 2015–16: Serie D/H, 9th
| Home colours | Away colours |

Associazione Sportiva Dilettantistica Progreditur Marcianise (formerly Real Marcianise Calcio) is an Italian football club, based in Marcianise, Campania.

== History ==
=== Foundation ===
The club was founded in 1951 as U.S. Marcianise.

=== Real Marcianise ===
Dissolved Real Marcianise's logo

==== Lega Pro Prima Divisione ====
In the Serie C2 2007-08 regular season, Real Marcianise Calcio, as renamed since 2004, finished third in Girone C, and qualified for the promotional playoffs. The team defeated fourth-placed Vigor Lamezia in the semi-finals, 2–1 on aggregate, and then defeated fifth-placed Celano in the finals, 3–1 on aggregate to win promotion to, the now called, Lega Pro Prima Divisione for the 2008–09 season.

==== The dissolution ====
At the end of the 2009-10 Lega Pro Prima Divisione season the club was excluded from the championships for financial problems and was dissolved.

=== A.S.D. Marcianise ===
A new team A.S.D. Marcianise comes fifteenth in Group A of Promozione Campania and was dissolved.

=== Progreditur Marcianise ===
==== 2011-2012 ====
In 2011 was founded a new team A.S.D. Progreditur Marcianise formed by the merger between Vernall and Real Volturno di Alvignano, an Eccellenza team. A.S.D. Progreditur Marcianise ended the season in mid-table (8th place).

==== 2012-2013 ====
In the 2012–2013 season the team won the championship of Eccellenza Campania winning promotion to Serie D.

== Colors and badge ==
The team's colors are yellow, red and green.
