= Stadio Francesco Gabrielli =

Coordinates: 45.0750°N 11.8053°E

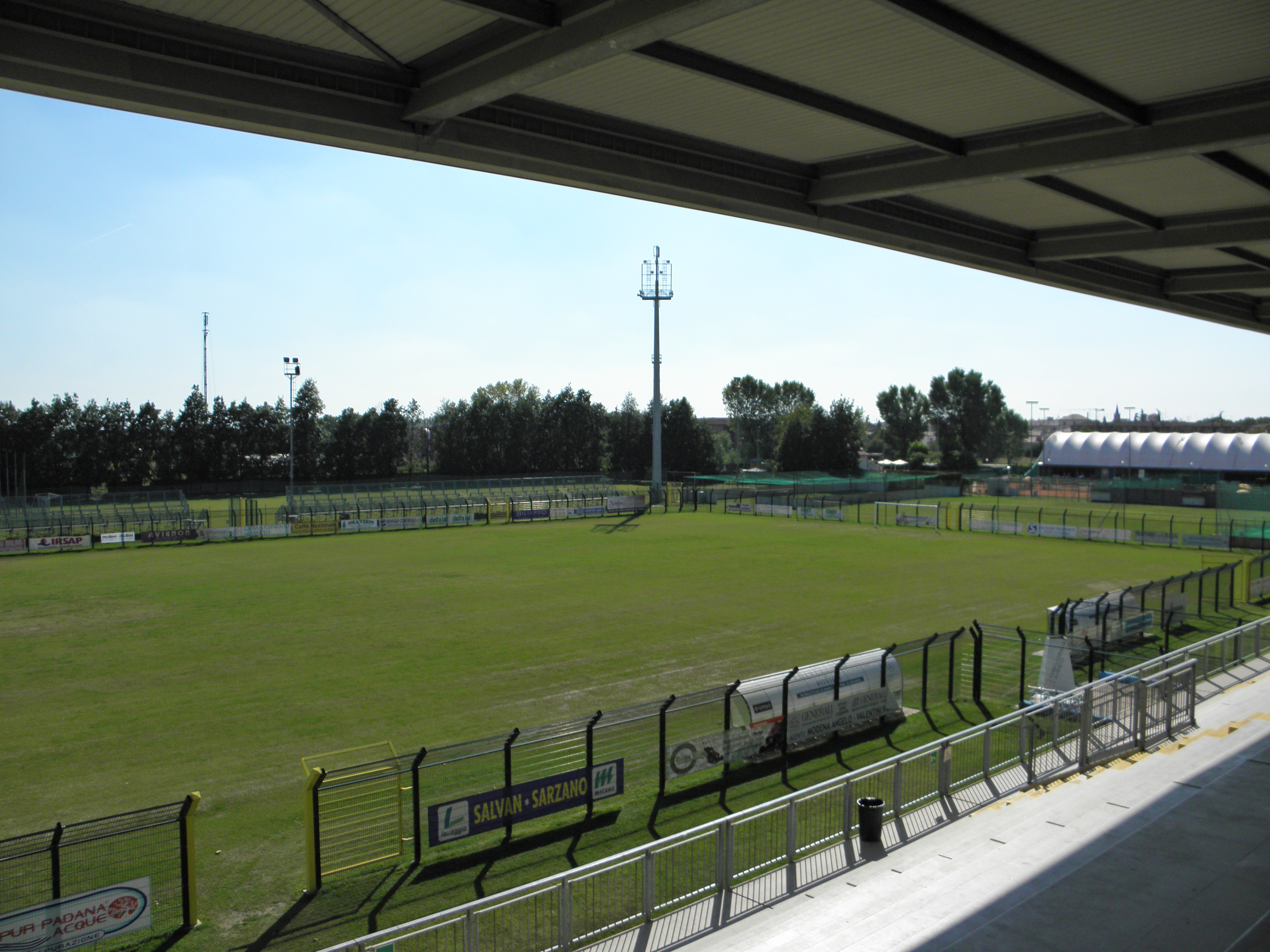
- Interactive map of Stadio Francesco Gabrielli
- Location: Rovigo, Italy
- Capacity: 3,500

Construction
- Built: 1892
- Opened: 1893
- Renovated: 1927

Tenant
- Rovigo Calcio

Stadio Francesco Gabrielli is an arena in Rovigo, Italy. It is primarily used for football, and is the home to the Rovigo Calcio of the Serie D. It opened in 1893 and holds 3,500 spectators.
