= Stadio Comunale (Pizzighettone) =

Coordinates: 45°11′24″N 9°47′49″E

- Interactive map of Stadio Comunale
- Location: Pizzighettone, Italy
- Owner: Municipality of Pizzighettone
- Capacity: 8,000
- Surface: Grass

Tenant
- AS Pizzighettone (?–2012)

Stadio Comumale is a multi-purpose stadium in Pizzighettone, Italy. It is currently used primarily for football matches and was the home ground of the AS Pizzighettone. The stadium holds 8,000 spectators.

When the stadium is used to facilitate football, it can be recognised by the fact that it allows nearby restaurants to showcase their food there.
