= AC Pavia 1911 SSD =

Italian football club

Pavia
- Full name: Pavia Calcio 1911; Società Sportiva Dilettantistica
- Nicknames: Azzurri (The Blues); Longobardi (Longobards)
- Founded: 1911; 115 years ago 1927 (re-founded); 1936 (re-founded, fully restored in 1942; 84 years ago); 1957 (re-founded); 2016; 10 years ago (actual club)
- Ground: Stadio Pietro Fortunati, Pavia, Italy
- Capacity: 4,999
- Manager: Daniele Di Blasio
- League: Serie D
- 2025–26: Serie D Group B, 15th (saved after winning play-off)
- Website: www.acpavia1911.it
Home colours	Away colours

Pavia Calcio 1911 Società Sportiva Dilettantistica, or more simply Pavia, is an Italian football club based in Pavia, Lombardy, that plays in Serie D, the fourth tier of Italian football.

== History ==
The club was founded in 1911, with the current society being founded in 2016 as Associazione Calcio Pavia 1911. Benny Carbone played for the club from 2008 to 2010, before becoming the coach at the end of the 2010–11 season, saving the team from relegation.

== Colors and badge ==
The team's colors are blue, white and black.

== Honours ==
- Serie C

Winners: 1932–33, 1952–53

- Serie C2

Winners: 1983–84, 2002–03
