= Stadio Pietro Fortunati =

Football stadium in Pavia, Italy

Coordinates: 45°12′18″N 9°9′10″E

- Interactive map of Stadio Pietro Fortunati
- Location: Pavia, Italy
- Owner: Municipality of Pavia
- Capacity: 4,999
- Surface: Grass

Tenant
- A.C. Pavia

Stadio Pietro Fortunati is a football stadium in Pavia, Italy. It is the home ground of A.C. Pavia. The stadium holds 4,999.
