= Stadio Vincenzo Presti =

Multi-use stadium in Gela, Italy

Coordinates: 37°4′6″N 14°15′27″E

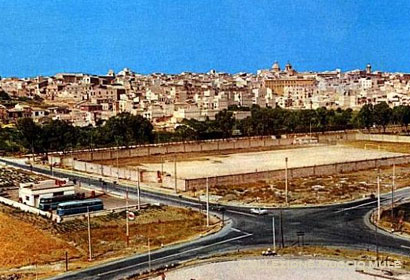

Vincenzo Presti is a multi-use stadium in Gela, Italy. It is currently used mostly for football matches and is the home ground of Gela Calcio. The stadium holds 4,400.
