= Stadio Vito Simone Veneziani =

Coordinates: 40.9571°N 17.2937°E

- Interactive map of Stadio Vito Simone Veneziani
- Location: Monopoli, Italy
- Owner: Municipality of Monopoli
- Capacity: 6,880
- Surface: Grass

Tenant
- Monopoli

Stadio Vito Simone Veneziani is a multi-use stadium in Monopoli, Italy. It is currently used mostly for football matches and is the home ground of Monopoli. The stadium holds 6,880 attendance.
