= Stadio Giuseppe Voltini =

Stadium in Crema, Lombardy, Italy

Coordinates: 45°21′28″N 9°40′32″E

- Interactive map of Stadio Giuseppe Voltini
- Location: Crema, Italy
- Owner: Municipality of Crema
- Capacity: 4,100
- Surface: Grass

Tenants
- A.C. Crema 1908; U.S. Pergolettese 1932

Stadio Giuseppe Voltini is a multi-use stadium in Crema, Lombardy, northern Italy. It is currently used mostly for football matches and is the home ground of A.C. Crema 1908 and U.S. Pergolettese 1932. The stadium holds 4,100.
