= Football at the 2019 Summer Universiade – Men's tournament =

Men's football at the 2019 Summer Universiade
Tournament details
- Dates: 2–13 July
- Teams: 12 (from 5 confederations)

Final positions
- Champions: Japan (7th title)
- Runners-up: Brazil
- Third place: Italy
- Fourth place: Russia

Tournament statistics
- Matches played: 28
- Goals scored: 88 (3.14 per match)
- Top scorer(s): (Uruguay) Santiago Pallares (Japan) Ayase Ueda (5 goals)

The men's tournament of football at the 2019 Summer Universiade was held in July in Naples, Italy.

== Teams ==
AFC	CAF	CONMEBOL	CONCACAF	UEFA
Japan; South Korea	South Africa	Argentina; Brazil; Uruguay	Mexico	France; Italy (H); Republic of Ireland; Russia; Ukraine

== Preliminary round ==
All times are in Central European Summer Time (UTC+02:00).

Tiebreakers

The ranking of each team in each group was determined as follows:

1. Greatest number of points obtained in group matches;
2. Goal difference in all group matches;
3. Greatest number of goals scored in all group matches;
4. Greatest number of points obtained in group matches between the teams concerned;
5. Greatest number of goals scored in the group matches between the teams concerned;
6. Fair play points system taking into account the number of yellow and red cards in all group matches;
7. Drawing of lots by the Technical Committee.

=== Group A ===
Pos	Team	Pld	W	D	L	GF	GA	GD	Pts	Qualification
1	Republic of Ireland	2	1	1	0	4	3	+1	4	Elimination round
2	South Korea	2	1	0	1	4	4	0	3	Elimination round
3	Uruguay	2	0	1	1	2	3	−1	1	Classification round

Source: Universiade
2 July 2019
18:00

South Korea	2–1	Uruguay
Lee Kun-hee 31'; Cha Oh-yeon 85'	Report	Pallares 20'

Stadio Alberto Pinto, Caserta
Referee: Mykola Balakin (Ukraine)
5 July 2019
21:00

Republic of Ireland	3–2	South Korea
Duffy 61'; O'Sullivan 68' (pen.), 83' (pen.)	Report	Baek Seung-woo 6'; Kim Ho 86'

Stadio Comunale San Mauro, Casoria
Referee: Kevin Ortega (Peru)
7 July 2019
18:00

Republic of Ireland	1–1	Uruguay
O'Sullivan 21'	Report	Pallares 27' (pen.)

Stadio Alberto Pinto, Caserta
Referee: Rohit Saggi (Norway)

=== Group B ===
Pos	Team	Pld	W	D	L	GF	GA	GD	Pts	Qualification
1	Italy (H)	2	2	0	0	4	0	+4	6	Elimination round
2	Ukraine	2	1	0	1	1	2	−1	3	Elimination round
3	Mexico	2	0	0	2	0	3	−3	0	Classification round

Source: Universiade
(H) Hosts
2 July 2019
21:00

Italy	2–0	Mexico
Ungaro 55'; Serena 90+3'	Report

Stadio Arechi, Salerno
Referee: Timotheos Christofi (Cyprus)
5 July 2019
18:00

Ukraine	0–2	Italy
	Report	Mercadante 38'; Strada 43'

Stadio Simonetta Lamberti
Referee: Julian Weinberger (Austria)
7 July 2019
18:00

Ukraine	1–0	Mexico
Kostyshyn 75'	Report

Stadio Marcello Torre
Referee: Luis Quiroz Prado (Ecuador)

=== Group C ===
Pos	Team	Pld	W	D	L	GF	GA	GD	Pts	Qualification
1	Brazil	2	1	1	0	4	1	+3	4	Elimination round
2	France	2	1	1	0	4	2	+2	4	Elimination round
3	South Africa	2	0	0	2	1	6	−5	0	Classification round

Source: Universiade
2 July 2019
21:00

France	3–1	South Africa
Chavanon 10'; Corneillie 79'; Guerineau 86'	Report	Pienaar 88'

Stadio Ciro Vigorito, Benevento
Referee: Yusuke Araki (Japan)
5 July 2019
18:00

Brazil	1–1	France
Caetano 9'	Report	Feneuil 74'

Stadio Marcello Torre
Referee: Sherzod Kasimov (Uzbekistan)
7 July 2019
18:00

Brazil	3–0	South Africa
Walters 10' (o.g.); Luiz Eduardo 14'; L. Dos Santos 83'	Report

Stadio Ciro Vigorito
Referee: Keylor Herrera Villalobos (Costa Rica)

=== Group D ===
Pos	Team	Pld	W	D	L	GF	GA	GD	Pts	Qualification
1	Japan	2	2	0	0	7	1	+6	6	Elimination round
2	Russia	2	1	0	1	3	4	−1	3	Elimination round
3	Argentina	2	0	0	2	0	5	−5	0	Classification round

Source: Universiade
2 July 2019
18:00

Argentina	0–2	Russia
	Report	Kirsanov 43'; Yusupov 69'

Stadio Simonetta Lamberti, Cava de' Tirreni
Referee: Abdel Aziz Bouh (Mauritania)
5 July 2019
21:00

Japan	3–0	Argentina
Ueda 45+1', 56'; Hayashi 90+3'	Report

Stadio San Francesco d'Assisi, Nocera Inferiore
Referee: Robert Hennessy (Republic of Ireland)
7 July 2019
18:00

Japan	4–1	Russia
Hayashi 13'; Kaneko 20', 24'; Hatate 36'	Report	Ustinov 76'

Stadio Comunale San Mauro, Casoria
Referee: Dewson Freitas Da Silva (Brazil)

== Classification round ==
9th–12th place semifinals
A3	Uruguay (p)	3 (3)
D3	Argentina	3 (2)
B3	Mexico (p)	2 (3)
C3	South Africa	2 (1)

9th place match
A3	Uruguay	0
B3	Mexico	3
11th place match
D3	Argentina	2 (1)
C3	South Africa (p)	2 (2)

=== 9th–12th place semifinals ===
9 July 2019
18:00 CEST

Uruguay	3–3	Argentina
Pallares 52' (pen.), 59', 65'	Report	Pallares 1' (o.g.); Princic 62'; Chacon 69' (o.g.)
Penalties
	3–2

Stadio Marcello Torre, Pagani
Referee: Silva Freitas (Brazil)
9 July 2019
18:00 CEST

Mexico	2–2	South Africa
Mogorosi 22' (o.g.); De La Rosa 56'	Report	Makhene 21'; Chuene 84'
Penalties
	3–1

Stadio Simonetta Lamberti, Cava de' Tirreni
Referee: Kevin Ortega (Peru)

=== 11th place match ===
11 July 2019
17:00 CEST

Argentina	2–2	South Africa
Solis 14'; Van de Casteele 90'	Report	Nkabinde 10'; Galane 27'
Penalties
Van de Casteele (penalty scored); Perez (penalty missed); Sotelo (penalty missed); Maitini (penalty missed); Wartel (penalty missed)	1–2	Rapelang (penalty scored); Nkabinde (penalty scored); Mosiea (penalty missed); Jack (penalty missed)

Stadio Simonetta Lamberti, Cava de' Tirreni
Referee: Abdel Aziz Bouh (Mauritania)

=== 9th place match ===
11 July 2019
17:00 CEST

Uruguay	0–3	Mexico
	Report	De La Rosa 31', 71'; Escobedo 86' (pen.)

Stadio San Mauro, San Mauro la Bruca
Referee: Keylor Herrera (Costa Rica)

== Elimination round ==
Fifth place
B2	Ukraine	1 (1)
A2	South Korea (p)	1 (3)
Seventh place
A1	Republic of Ireland	1 (3)
C2	France (p)	1 (4)

5th–8th place semifinals
A1	Republic of Ireland	1
B2	Ukraine	2
C2	France	2
A2	South Korea	3

Quarterfinals
A1	Republic of Ireland	0
D2	Russia	1
C1	Brazil	2
B2	Ukraine	1
B1	Italy	1
C2	France	0
D1	Japan	2
A2	South Korea	0

Semifinals
D2	Russia	1
C1	Brazil	2
B1	Italy	3 (4)
D1	Japan (p)	3 (5)

Final
C1	Brazil	1
D1	Japan	4
Third place
D2	Russia	2 (3)
B1	Italy (p)	2 (4)

=== Quarterfinals ===
9 July 2019
21:00 CEST

Republic of Ireland	0–1	Russia
	Report	Salamatov 7' (pen.)

Stadio Alberto Pinto, Caserta
Referee: Timotheos Christofi (Cyprus)

9 July 2019
21:00 CEST

Brazil	2–1	Ukraine
R. Dos Santos 80'; Milioransa 90'	Report	Kostyshyn 9'

Arena di Cercola Stadium, Naples
Referee: Rohit Saggi (Norway)

9 July 2019
21:00 CEST

Italy	1–0	France
Strada 90'	Report

Stadio Ciro Vigorito, Benevento
Referee: Robert Hennessy (Ireland)

9 July 2019
21:00 CEST

Japan	2–0	South Korea
Hatate 79'; Ogashiwa 87'	Report

Stadio San Francesco d'Assisi, Nocera Inferiore
Referee: Sherzod Kasimov (Uzbekistan)

=== 5th–8th place semifinals ===
11 July 2019
17:00 CEST

Republic of Ireland	1–2	Ukraine
Hollywood 67'	Report	Doroshenko 56'; Udod 90+1'

Stadio San Francesco d'Assisi, Nocera Inferiore
Referee: Yusuke Araki (Japan)

11 July 2019
17:00 CEST

France	2–3	South Korea
Guerinau 61'; Cho Yun-seong 64' (o.g.)	Report	Kim Min-jun 26'; Yang Ji-hoon 43'; Kim Hyeon-woo 90+3'

Stadio Alberto Pinto, Caserta
Referee: Julian Weinberger (Austria)

=== Semifinals ===
11 July 2019
17:00 CEST

Russia	1–2	Brazil
Pogorelov 52'	Report	Rafael 14'; Eduardo 18'

Stadio Arechi, Salerno
Referee: Sherzod Kasimov (Uzbekistan)

11 July 2019
21:00 CEST

Italy	3–3	Japan
R. Yamahara 24' (o.g.); Vitturini 79'; Zonta 90+4' (pen.)	Report	Kodama 28'; Ogashiwa 58'; Kaneko 62'
Penalties
	4–5

Stadio Arechi, Salerno
Referee: Dewson Freitas da Silva (Brazil)

=== Seventh place match ===
13 July 2019
17:00 CEST

Republic of Ireland	1–1	France
Falvey 89'	Report	Blanchet 21'
Penalties
	3–4

Stadio Simonetta Lamberti, Cava de' Tirreni
Referee: Mykola Balakin (Ukraine)

=== Fifth place match ===
13 July 2019
17:00 CEST

Ukraine	1–1	South Korea
Radchenko 45'	Report	Kim Hyeon-woo 60'
Penalties
	1–3

Stadio Alberto Pinto, Caserta
Referee: Luis Quiroz (Ecuador)

=== Bronze medal match ===
13 July 2019
17:00 CEST

Russia	2–2	Italy (bronze)
Salamatov 67' (pen.); Pogorelov 90+3'	Report	Zonta 13' (pen.); Galeandro 34'
Penalties
Yusupov (penalty scored); Nasyrov (penalty scored); Kuftin (penalty missed); Kirsanov (penalty scored); Salamatov (penalty missed)	3–4	(penalty scored) Sbrissa; (penalty scored) Ruzzittu; (penalty missed) Collodel; (penalty scored) Mercadante; (penalty scored) Strada

Stadio Arechi, Salerno
Referee: Kevin Ortega (Peru)

=== Gold medal match ===
13 July 2019
21:00 CEST

(silver) Brazil	1–4	Japan (gold)
Dudu 78'	Report	Ueda 56' (pen.), 64', 82'; Hatate 70'

Stadio Arechi, Salerno
Referee: Rohit Saggi (Norway)
