= Football at the 2019 Summer Universiade – Women's tournament =

Women's football at the 2019 Summer Universiade
Tournament details
- Dates: 2–12 July
- Teams: 12 (from 5 confederations)

Final positions
- Champions: North Korea (3rd title)
- Runners-up: Japan
- Third place: Russia
- Fourth place: Republic of Ireland

Tournament statistics
- Matches played: 28
- Goals scored: 89 (3.18 per match)
- Top scorer(s): (North Korea) Ri Hae-yon (North Korea) Ri Hyang-sim (5 goals)

The women's tournament of football at the 2019 Summer Universiade was held in July in Naples, Italy.

== Teams ==
AFC	CAF	CONCACAF	CONMEBOL	UEFA
China; Japan; North Korea; South Korea	South Africa	Canada; Mexico; United States	Brazil	Italy (H); Republic of Ireland; Russia

== Preliminary round ==
All times are in Central European Summer Time (UTC+02:00).

Tiebreakers

The ranking of each team in each group was determined as follows:

1. Greatest number of points obtained in group matches;
2. Goal difference in all group matches;
3. Greatest number of goals scored in all group matches;
4. Greatest number of points obtained in group matches between the teams concerned;
5. Greatest number of goals scored in the group matches between the teams concerned;
6. Fair play points system taking into account the number of yellow and red cards in all group matches;
7. Drawing of lots by the Technical Committee.

=== Group A ===
Pos	Team	Pld	W	D	L	GF	GA	GD	Pts	Qualification
1	North Korea	2	2	0	0	12	1	+11	6	Elimination round
2	Canada	2	1	0	1	2	4	−2	3	Elimination round
3	South Africa	2	0	0	2	0	9	−9	0	Classification round

Source: Universiade
2 July 2019
18:00

North Korea	4–1	Canada
Ri Hae-yon 14'; Nour 44' (o.g.); Ri Hyang-sim 47+2'; Ri Yu-jong 76'	Report	Bunker 9'

Stadio Arena, Pisa
Referee: Odette Hamilton (Jamaica)
4 July 2019
21:00

South Africa	0–8	North Korea
	Report	Jon So-yon 9' (pen.); Ri Hae-yon 15', 28', 29', 56'; Kim Phyong-hwa 16'; Ri Hyang-sim 39'; Hong Kum-hyang 90+2'

Stadio Alberto Pinto, Caserta
Referee: Frida Nielsen (Denmark)
6 July 2019
18:00

South Africa	0–1	Canada
	Report	Bearne 17'

Stadio San Francesco d'Assisi, Nocera Inferiore
Referee: Karitza Guerra (Honduras)

=== Group B ===
Pos	Team	Pld	W	D	L	GF	GA	GD	Pts	Qualification
1	Russia	2	2	0	0	2	0	+2	6	Elimination round
2	China	2	1	0	1	3	3	0	3	Elimination round
3	Mexico	2	0	0	2	2	4	−2	0	Classification round

Source: Universiade
2 July 2019
21:00

Mexico	0–1	Russia
	Report	Shishkina 72'

Stadio San Francesco d'Assisi, Nocera Inferiore
4 July 2019
18:00

China	3–2	Mexico
Yan 18'; Wang H. 45+2', 57'	Report	Barrientos 27'; Ramos 52'

Arena di Cercola Stadium, Naples
Referee: Emikar Calderas (Venezuela)
6 July 2019
18:00

China	0–1	Russia
	Report	Organova 48'

Stadio Marcello Torre, Pagani
Referee: Shamirah Nabadda (Uganda)

=== Group C ===
Pos	Team	Pld	W	D	L	GF	GA	GD	Pts	Qualification
1	Republic of Ireland	2	2	0	0	3	1	+2	6	Elimination round
2	South Korea	2	0	1	1	4	5	−1	1	Elimination round
3	Brazil	2	0	1	1	3	4	−1	1	Classification round

Source: Universiade
2 July 2019
21:00

Republic of Ireland	1–0	Brazil
Kelly 77'	Report

Stadio San Mauro, San Mauro la Bruca
Referee: Hristiyana Guteva (Bulgaria)
4 July 2019
18:00

South Korea	1–2	Republic of Ireland
Fox 45+3' (o.g.)	Report	Ryan Doyle 6' (pen.), 41'

Referee: Choki Om (Bhutan)
6 July 2019
18:00

South Korea	3–3	Brazil
Kim Hye-ji 17'; Kang Tae-kyung 36'; Ko Yoo-jin 87'	Report	Grabias 59'; Demetrio 73'; Pacheco 88'

Referee: Marta Huerta de Aza (Spain)

=== Group D ===
Pos	Team	Pld	W	D	L	GF	GA	GD	Pts	Qualification
1	Japan	2	2	0	0	4	2	+2	6	Elimination round
2	Italy	2	1	0	1	3	3	0	3	Elimination round
3	United States	2	0	0	2	2	4	−2	0	Classification round

Source: Universiade
2 July 2019
18:00

Italy	1–2	Japan
Goldoni 30'	Report	Koyama 18', 74'

Stadio Arechi, Salerno
Referee: Marta Huerta de Aza (Spain)
4 July 2019
21:00

United States	1–2	Italy
Castaneda 30'	Report	Caruso 25'; Fusini 62'

6 July 2019
18:00

United States	1–2	Japan
Sanchez 28'	Report	Chiba 45+1' (pen.), 87'

Referee: Hristiyana Guteva (Bulgaria)

== Classification round ==
9th–12th place semifinals
A3	South Africa	0
D3	United States	4
B3	Mexico	2
C3	Brazil	0

9th place match
D3	United States	3
B3	Mexico	1
11th place match
A3	South Africa	0
C3	Brazil	1

=== 9th–12th place semifinals ===
8 July 2019
21:00 CEST

Mexico	2–0	Brazil
Ramos 32'; Casas 46'	Report

Stadio Alberto Pinto, Caserta
Referee: Oh Hyeon-jeong (South Korea)

8 July 2019
21:00 CEST

South Africa	0–4	United States
	Report	Castaneda 7'; Villacorta 30'; Sanchez 78' (pen.); Fishel 85'

Stadio San Francesco d'Assisi, Nocera Inferiore
Referee: Odette Hamilton (Jamaica)

=== 11th place match ===
8 July 2019
17:00 CEST

South Africa	0–1	Brazil
	Report	Grabias 38'

Stadio Marcello Torre, Pagani
Referee: Shamirah Nabadda (Uganda)

=== 9th place match ===
10 July 2019
17:00 CEST

United States	3–1	Mexico
Athens 35', 70'; Fishel 50'	Report	Ramos Valenzuela 89'

Stadio San Mauro, San Mauro la Bruca
Referee: Choki Om (Bhutan)

== Elimination round ==
Fifth place
B2	China	1 (2)
C2	South Korea (p)	1 (4)
Seventh place
D2	Italy	5
A2	Canada	2

Consolation semifinals
D2	Italy	0
B2	China	1
C2	South Korea	2
A2	Canada	1

Quarterfinals
A1	North Korea	4
D2	Italy	1
C1	Republic of Ireland (p)	0 (4)
B2	China	0 (1)
B1	Russia (p)	1 (4)
C2	South Korea	1 (1)
D1	Japan	3
A2	Canada	0

Semifinals
A1	North Korea	5
C1	Republic of Ireland	0
B1	Russia	1
D1	Japan	2

Final
A1	North Korea	2
D1	Japan	1
Third place
C1	Republic of Ireland	2 (2)
B1	Russia (p)	2 (4)

=== Quarterfinals ===
8 July 2019
18:00 CEST

Republic of Ireland	0–0	China
	Report
Penalties
McQuillan (penalty scored); Smith-Lynch (penalty scored); Craven (penalty scored); Ryan-Doyle (penalty scored)	4–1	Yan Yingying (penalty missed); Chen Shuyue (penalty scored); Li Jianghong (penalty missed)

Stadio Marcello Torre, Pagani
Referee: Myriam Marcotte, (Canada)

8 July 2019
18:00 CEST

Russia	1–1	South Korea
Khotyreva 22'	Report	Han Chae-rin 68'
Penalties
Organova (penalty scored); Sinko (penalty scored); Gasanova (penalty scored); Cherkasova (penalty scored)	4–1	Mok Seung-yeon (penalty missed); Lee So-hee (penalty scored); Song Ji-yoon (penalty missed)

Stadio Simonetta Lamberti, Cava de' Tirreni
Referee: Marta Huerta De Aza (Spain)

8 July 2019
21:00 CEST

Japan	3–0	Canada
Ibaraki 11'; Imada 45', 80'	Report

Stadio Ciro Vigorito, Benevento
Referee: Graziella Pirriatore (Italy)

8 July 2019
21:00 CEST

North Korea	4–1	Italy
Ri Un-yong 34'; Wi Jong-sim 49'; Ri Hyang-sim 54', 88'	Report	Marinelli 50'

Stadio San Mauro, San Mauro la Bruca
Referee: Hristiyana Guteva (Bulgaria)

=== 5th–8th place semifinals ===
10 July 2019
17:00 CEST

Italy	0–1	China
	Report	Yan Yingying 89'

Stadio Ciro Vigorito, Benevento
Referee: Karitza Yissel Guerra (Honduras)

10 July 2019
17:00 CEST

South Korea	2–1	Canada
Namgung Ye-ji 68', 70'	Report	Nour 76'

Stadio Alberto Pinto, Caserta
Referee: Emikar Calderas (Venezuelan)

=== Semifinals ===
10 July 2019
17:00 CEST

North Korea	5–0	Republic of Ireland
Wi Jong-sim 15', 67'; Sung Hyang-sim 29'; Ri Hyang-sim 59'; Jon So-yon 84'	Report

Stadio Arechi, Salerno
Referee: Graziella Pirriatore (Italy)

10 July 2019
21:00 CEST

Russia	1–2	Japan
Dubova 73'	Report	Ouci 14', 49'

Stadio Arechi, Salerno
Referee: Marta Huerta de Aza (Spain)

=== 7th place match ===
12 July 2019
17:00 CEST

Italy	5–2	Canada
Ferrato 3'; Glionna 10'; Spinelli 49'; Bonfantini 54'; Goldoni 90+3'	Report	Bunker 28'; Hinchliffe 86' (pen.)

Stadio Marcello Torre, Pagani
Referee: Chang Xinxin (China)

=== 5th place match ===
12 July 2019
17:00 CEST

China	1–1	South Korea
Chen Yun 57'	Report	Namgung Ye-ji 45+1'
Penalties
Xiong Xi (penalty missed); Shen Mengyu (penalty scored); Chen Yun (penalty scored); Xin Tian (penalty missed)	2–4	Namgung Ye-ji (penalty scored); Kang Tae-kyung (penalty scored); Lee So-hee (penalty scored); Shin Na-yeong (penalty scored)

Stadio San Francesco d'Assisi, Nocera Inferiore
Referee: Frida Nielsen (Denmark)

=== Bronze medal match ===
12 July 2019
17:00 CEST

Republic of Ireland	2–2	Russia (bronze)
Kelly 16'; Ryan Doyle 64'	Report	Shkoda 72'; Organova 77'
Penalties
McQuillan (penalty scored); Smith-Lynch (penalty missed); Craven (penalty missed); Ryan Doyle (penalty scored)	2–4	Organova (penalty scored); Sinko (penalty scored); Gasanova (penalty scored); Dubova (penalty scored)

Stadio Ciro Vigorito, Benevento
Referee: Oh Hyeon-jeong (South Korea)

=== Gold medal match ===
12 July 2019
21:00 CEST

(gold) North Korea	2–1	Japan (silver)
Wi Jong-sim 30'; Jon So-yon 89'	Report	Imai 89'

Stadio Ciro Vigorito, Benevento
Referee: Hristiyana Guteva (Bulgaria)
