= 2010–11 Lega Pro Prima Divisione =

Lega Pro Prima Divisione
- Season: 2010–11
- Champions: Gubbio (group A); Nocerina (group B)
- Promoted: Gubbio, Verona (group A); Nocerina, Juve Stabia (group B)
- Relegated: Monza, F.C. Südtirol, Paganese (group A); Cosenza, Ternana, Cavese (group B)

The 2010–11 Lega Pro Prima Divisione season was the thirty-third football league season of Italian Lega Pro Prima Divisione since its establishment in 1978, and the third since the renaming from Serie C to Lega Pro.

It will be divided into two phases: the regular season, and the playoff phase.

The league will also be composed of 36 teams divided into two divisions of 18 teams each, whose teams will be divided geographically. Teams will play only other teams in their own division, once at home and once away for a total of 34 matches each.

Teams finishing first in the regular season, plus one team winning the playoff round from each division will be promoted to Serie B; teams finishing last in the regular season, plus two relegation playoff losers from each division will be relegated to Lega Pro Seconda Divisione. In all, four teams will be promoted to Serie B, and six teams will be relegated to Lega Pro Seconda Divisione.

== Events ==
=== Start of season ===
The league was to feature four teams relegated from Serie B in 2009–10. Triestina, Mantova, Gallipoli and Salernitana. But on July 17, 2010 Mantova and Gallipoli was excluded by the Federal Council and relegated to Serie D and Promozione respectively. Because of the exclusion of Ancona from Serie B Triestina was admitted back to fill the vacancy on August 4, 2010.

It is to feature six teams promoted from 2009–10 Lega Pro Seconda Divisione; the three division winners - F.C. Südtirol, Lucchese and Juve Stabia, and the three playoff winners - Spezia, Gubbio and Cisco Roma (later renamed Atletico Roma).

The remaining 26 teams were to come from the teams that played in 2009–10 Lega Pro Prima Divisione that were neither promoted nor relegated. Of those, Arezzo (4th in Girone A), Perugia (11th in Girone A), Rimini (4th in Girone B) and Real Marcianise (12th in Girone B) were also listed by the Covisoc organization as not having met the financial requirements to be admitted. On 17 July 2010 these teams were officially excluded from the league along with Figline (7th in Girone A) by Federal Council's decision.

On 4 August 2010, the eight vacancies created were filled by the following teams, all of which were destined to play in Lega Pro Seconda Divisione for the 2010-11 season before the call-up:

- Paganese, which finished 17th in Prima Divisione 2009-10 - Girone A, originally relegated for losing in the playouts.
- Pavia, which finished 5th and lost in the playoff semi-finals in Seconda Divisione 2009-10 - Girone A
- Bassano Virtus, which finished 7th in Seconda Divisione 2009-10 - Girone B
- Nocerina, which finished 13th in Seconda Divisione 2009-10 - Girone B
- Barletta, which finished 5th and lost in the playoff semi-finals in Seconda Divisione 2009-10 - Girone C
- Siracusa, which finished 6th in Seconda Divisione 2009-10 - Girone C
- Gela, which finished 7th in Seconda Divisione 2009-10 - Girone C
- Pisa, which finished 1st in Serie D 2009-10 - Girone D

== Girone A ==
Location of teams in Girone A 2010–11

=== Teams ===
Club	City	Stadium	Capacity	2009–10 season
Alessandria	Alessandria	Giuseppe Moccagatta	8,182	8th in Lega Pro Prima Divisione A
Bassano Virtus	Bassano del Grappa	Rino Mercante	2,952	7th in Lega Pro Seconda Divisione B
Como	Como	Giuseppe Sinigaglia	15,000	12th in Lega Pro Prima Divisione A
Cremonese	Cremona	Giovanni Zini	22,000	3rd in Lega Pro Prima Divisione A
Gubbio	Gubbio	Pietro Barbetti	5,000	3rd in Lega Pro Seconda Divisione B
Lumezzane	Lumezzane	Nuovo Stadio Comunale	4,150	6th in Lega Pro Prima Divisione A
Monza	Monza	Brianteo	18,568	10th in Lega Pro Prima Divisione A
Paganese	Pagani	Marcello Torre	3,700	17th in Lega Pro Prima Divisione A
Pavia	Pavia	Pietro Fortunati	6,000	5th in Lega Pro Seconda Divisione A
Pergocrema	Crema	Giuseppe Voltini	3,490	15th in Lega Pro Prima Divisione A
Ravenna	Ravenna	Bruno Benelli	12,020	13th in Lega Pro Prima Divisione B
Reggiana	Reggio Emilia	Giglio	14,138	5th in Lega Pro Prima Divisione B
Salernitana	Salerno	Arechi	37,245	22nd in Serie B
Sorrento	Sorrento	Italia	3,600	9th in Lega Pro Prima Divisione A
SPAL	Ferrara	Paolo Mazza	19,000	7th in Lega Pro Prima Divisione B
Spezia	La Spezia	Alberto Picco	10,000	2nd in Lega Pro Seconda Divisione A
Südtirol	Brixen (playing in Bolzano)	Marco Druso	3,000	1st in Lega Pro Seconda Divisione A
Verona	Verona	Marc'Antonio Bentegodi	39,211	3rd in Lega Pro Prima Divisione B

=== League table ===
Pos	Team	Pld	W	D	L	GF	GA	GD	Pts	Promotion or relegation
1	Gubbio (C, P)	34	20	6	8	48	31	+17	65 (Note: SPAL, Lumezzane, Gubbio, Como, Pergocrema and Spezia were docked 1 point.)	Promotion to Serie B
2	Sorrento	34	16	10	8	61	43	+18	58	Qualification for Promotion play-off
3	Salernitana (E, R)	34	17	8	9	49	39	+10	54 (Note: Salernitana was docked 5 points.) (Note: Salernitana was later banned by FIGC for bankruptcy and Salerno Calcio was refounded in Serie D.)	Phoenix in Serie D
4	Hellas Verona (O, P)	34	12	14	8	42	30	+12	50	Qualification for Promotion play-off
5	Spezia	34	12	12	10	38	33	+5	47	
6	Lumezzane	34	12	11	11	34	34	0	46	
7	Reggiana	34	12	9	13	36	37	−1	45	
8	Como	34	10	15	9	41	40	+1	44	
9	SPAL	34	11	11	12	39	37	+2	43	
10	Cremonese	34	9	15	10	37	38	−1	42 (Note: CRE 0-0 BAS ; BAS 0-0 CRE)	
11	Bassano Virtus	34	10	12	12	26	29	−3	42	
12	Pavia	34	9	12	13	34	45	−11	39	
13	Ravenna (R)	34	10	12	12	33	40	−7	35 (Note: RAV 3-1 PER ; PER 1-2 RAV) (Note: Ravenna was docked 7 points and then excluded by Italian disciplinary committee for match fixing) (Note: Ravenna excluded from the Federal Council and relegated to Serie D.)	Phoenix in Serie D
14	Pergocrema	34	7	15	12	30	35	−5	35	Qualification for Relegation play-off
15	Monza	34	7	11	16	34	49	−15	32 (Note: MON: 7 pts ; SUD: 6 pts ; PAG: 4 pts) (Note: Monza remained in the league in place of relegated Alessandria)	Qualification for Relegation play-off
16	Südtirol	34	7	11	16	28	43	−15	32 (Note: Südtirol remained in the league to fill the vacancies created.)	Qualification for Relegation play-off
17	Paganese (R)	34	8	8	18	17	36	−19	32	Relegation to Lega Pro Seconda Divisione
18	Alessandria (R)	34	15	12	7	40	28	+12	55 (Note: Alessandria was docked 2 points.) (Note: Alessandria relegated to the last place by Italian national disciplinary committee for match fixing)	Relegation to Lega Pro Seconda Divisione

Source: Tutto Lega Pro
Rules for classification: 1) points; 2) goal difference; 3) number of goals scored.
(C) Champions; (E) Eliminated; (O) Play-off winners; (P) Promoted; (R) Relegated

=== Results ===
Home \ Away	ALE	BAS	COM	CRE	GUB	LUM	MON	PAG	PAV	PER	RAV	REA	SAL	SOR	SPA	SPE	SÜD	HEL
Alessandria		1–0	0–0	1–0	2–0	1–1	0–0	1–0	1–0	2–1	2–1	0–1	3–1	3–3	1–0	3–1	0–0	2–1
Bassano Virtus	0–1		2–2	0–0	0–1	0–1	2–1	1–0	0–0	1–0	2–0	0–0	2–0	2–1	2–3	0–0	0–0	1–1
Como	0–0	0–1		1–0	0–1	3–0	2–4	0–0	4–2	1–1	1–2	0–2	2–1	3–2	2–3	2–1	0–0	1–1
Cremonese	1–1	0–0	2–2		5–1	1–0	2–0	2–0	2–1	0–0	1–0	0–1	1–1	0–0	1–4	2–2	0–0	1–2
Gubbio	1–0	1–1	1–1	1–0		0–1	4–0	3–1	1–0	0–2	0–0	2–1	3–1	1–0	1–1	2–1	4–0	2–1
Lumezzane	0–3	3–1	2–2	2–2	0–2		1–0	2–0	1–1	1–1	0–0	2–2	1–3	1–2	1–0	1–2	1–0	1–1
Monza	2–0	2–0	0–1	2–2	2–3	0–1		0–0	2–0	2–2	1–1	0–0	3–3	1–1	2–1	0–0	3–4	1–5
Paganese	1–0	2–1	0–0	1–0	0–2	1–0	1–2		1–1	0–2	0–0	2–0	0–0	0–0	1–0	0–1	1–0	2–1
Pavia	1–1	1–1	1–1	0–1	1–1	1–4	1–0	1–0		1–0	1–1	2–0	1–2	5–4	1–0	2–1	2–1	1–1
Pergocrema	1–1	1–2	1–0	2–1	1–1	0–0	1–1	0–0	1–2		1–2	0–1	2–0	0–0	1–1	2–2	3–0	0–0
Ravenna	0–1	1–1	1–1	0–0	2–1	2–1	1–0	1–0	2–0	3–1		2–0	1–1	2–2	1–1	0–1	0–1	0–1
Reggiana	1–0	0–1	1–1	3–0	0–1	0–2	3–2	2–1	2–1	1–0	3–0		0–1	3–1	0–2	1–1	2–2	0–0
Salernitana	1–1	2–0	2–0	2–1	2–1	0–1	2–0	2–0	3–1	1–0	1–1	1–1		1–4	3–0	1–0	2–1	2–1
Sorrento	4–3	0–1	3–0	2–3	2–1	2–0	1–0	1–0	0–0	4–0	3–2	4–3	2–2		2–1	2–0	3–2	1–0
SPAL	1–1	1–0	1–2	1–1	1–0	0–2	0–0	3–1	1–0	0–1	3–0	2–0	1–2	0–0		1–1	2–2	1–1
Spezia	1–1	1–0	1–1	1–2	2–0	0–0	3–0	1–0	2–2	1–1	4–1	2–0	2–1	2–1	0–0		1–0	1–0
Südtirol	1–2	1–0	1–3	1–1	0–2	0–0	0–1	2–1	2–0	2–0	1–2	1–1	0–1	0–2	0–2	2–0		0–0
Hellas Verona	2–0	1–1	0–2	1–1	1–2	1–0	2–0	4–0	0–0	0–0	4–2	1–0	2–1	1–1	3–1	1–0	1–1	

Source: Tutto Lega Pro
Legend: Blue = home team win; Yellow = draw; Red = away team win.

=== Play-offs ===
==== Promotion ====
Semifinals
First legs scheduled 29 May 2011; return legs scheduled 5 June 2011

Team 1	Agg.	Team 2	1st leg	2nd leg
Verona (5)	3–1	(2) Sorrento	2–0	1–1
Salernitana (4)	4–2	(3) Alessandria	1–1	3–1

Final
First leg scheduled 12 June 2011; return leg scheduled 19 June 2011

Team 1	Agg.	Team 2	1st leg	2nd leg
Verona (5)	2–1	(4) Salernitana	2–0	0–1

==== Relegation ====
First legs scheduled 29 May 2011; return legs scheduled 5 June 2011

Team 1	Agg.	Team 2	1st leg	2nd leg
Südtirol (17)	2–2^{5}	(14) Ravenna	1–0	1–2
Monza (16)	1–1^{5}	(15) Pergocrema	1–0	0–1

5. If aggregate is tied, the worst placed team in regular season is relegated

Südtirol and Monza relegated to Lega Pro Seconda divisione

== Girone B ==
Location of teams in Girone B 2010–11

=== Teams ===
Club	City	Stadium	Capacity	2009–10 season
Andria BAT	Andria	degli Ulivi	9,140	14th in Lega Pro Prima Divisione B
Atletico Roma	Rome	Flaminio	32,000	3rd in Lega Pro Seconda Divisione C (as Cisco Roma)
Barletta	Barletta	Cosimo Puttilli	5,000	5th in Lega Pro Seconda Divisione C
Benevento	Benevento	Ciro Vigorito	18,975	5th in Lega Pro Prima Divisione A
Cavese	Cava de' Tirreni	Simonetta Lamberti	15,200	10th in Lega Pro Prima Divisione B
Cosenza	Cosenza	San Vito	24,000	11th in Lega Pro Prima Divisione B
Foggia	Foggia	Pino Zaccheria	25,000	15th in Lega Pro Prima Divisione B
Foligno	Foligno	Enzo Blasone	5,650	13th in Lega Pro Prima Divisione A
Gela	Gela	Vincenzo Presti	4,400	7th in Lega Pro Seconda Divisione C
Juve Stabia	Castellammare di Stabia	Romeo Menti	10,400	1st in Lega Pro Seconda Divisione C
Lucchese	Lucca	Porta Elisa	7,400	1st in Lega Pro Seconda Divisione B
Nocerina	Nocera Inferiore	San Francesco	6,852	13th in Lega Pro Seconda Divisione B
Pisa	Pisa	Arena Garibaldi	17,000	1st in Serie D/D
Siracusa	Syracuse	Nicola De Simone	6,200	6th in Lega Pro Seconda Divisione C
Taranto	Taranto	Erasmo Iacovone	28,000	8th in Lega Pro Prima Divisione B
Ternana	Terni	Libero Liberati	22,000	6th in Lega Pro Prima Divisione B
Viareggio	Viareggio	dei Pini	4,700	14th in Lega Pro Prima Divisione A
Virtus Lanciano	Lanciano	Guido Biondi	8,000	9th in Lega Pro Prima Divisione B

=== League table ===
Pos	Team	Pld	W	D	L	GF	GA	GD	Pts	Promotion or relegation
1	Nocerina (C, P)	34	21	9	4	52	30	+22	72	Promotion to Serie B
2	Benevento	34	17	10	7	53	40	+13	61	Qualification for Promotion play-off
3	Atletico Roma (D, R)	34	17	6	11	52	33	+19	57 (Note: Atletico Roma not admitted by the Federal Council and excluded from football.)	Excluded from professional football after the non-admission of the Federal Council
4	Taranto	34	14	13	7	36	28	+8	55 (Note: TAR 1-0 JUV ; JUV 0-3 TAR)	Qualification for Promotion play-off
5	Juve Stabia (O, P)	34	16	7	11	43	35	+8	55 (Note: Juve Stabia will be deducted 1 point in the next season.)	Qualification for Promotion play-off
6	Foggia	34	14	5	15	67	58	+9	45 (Note: Foggia and Ternana were docked 2 points.)	
7	Lucchese (R, R)	34	12	8	14	42	38	+4	44 (Note: LUC: 7 pts ; VIR: 5 pts ; SIR: 4 pts) (Note: Lucchese does not appeal against the exclusion of Covisoc and relegated to Eccellenza Tuscany as F.C. Lucca 2011.)	Relegation to Eccellenza
8	Virtus Lanciano	34	9	17	8	28	31	−3	44	
9	Siracusa	34	12	8	14	32	38	−6	44	
10	Pisa	34	10	13	11	39	40	−1	43	
11	Barletta	34	9	13	12	32	38	−6	40 (Note: BAR 0-0 GEL ; GEL 0-1 BAR)	
12	Gela (D, R)	34	10	10	14	31	42	−11	40 (Note: Gela does not appeal against the exclusion of Covisoc and relegated to Terza Categoria Caltanissetta.)	Relegation to Terza Categoria
13	Andria BAT	34	10	9	15	31	37	−6	39	
14	Cosenza (R)	34	10	14	10	36	38	−2	38 (Note: Cavese and Cosenza were docked 6 points.) (Note: Cosenza does not appeal against the exclusion of Covisoc and relegated to Serie D as Nuova Cosenza Calcio.)	Relegation to Serie D
15	Ternana	34	9	11	14	30	45	−15	36 (Note: Ternana remained in the league to fill the vacancies created.)	Qualification for Relegation play-off
16	Foligno	34	8	11	15	36	45	−9	31 (Note: FOL 2-0 VIA ; VIA 1-3 FOL) (Note: Foligno was docked 4 points.)	Qualification for Relegation play-off
17	Viareggio	34	6	13	15	30	44	−14	31	Qualification for Relegation play-off
18	Cavese (D, R, R)	34	8	11	15	31	41	−10	29 (Note: Cavese does not appeal against the exclusion of Covisoc and relegated to the Juniores Regionale Campania.)	Relegation to Juniores Regionale Championship

Source: Tutto Lega Pro
Rules for classification: 1) points; 2) goal difference; 3) number of goals scored.
(C) Champions; (D) Disqualified; (O) Play-off winners; (P) Promoted; (R) Relegated

=== Results ===
Home \ Away	AND	ARM	BRL	BEN	CAV	COS	FOG	FOL	GEL	JST	LUC	NOC	PIS	SIR	TAR	TER	VIA	VLN
Andria BAT		1–1	0–0	1–1	1–0	1–1	0–1	2–1	4–1	0–1	1–1	0–1	3–0	1–0	0–0	0–1	0–0	0–0
Atletico Roma	0–1		3–0	3–0	6–0	4–1	3–3	1–2	1–2	1–0	1–2	2–3	3–1	2–1	1–0	0–0	2–1	0–0
Barletta	3–2	0–0		1–1	3–3	2–0	1–2	0–0	0–0	0–2	1–0	1–2	1–1	1–0	0–0	1–2	0–0	0–2
Benevento	2–0	2–0	1–2		1–0	3–1	4–3	2–0	2–1	1–1	2–1	1–1	1–0	1–0	0–0	3–1	2–2	3–5
Cavese	3–0	0–2	1–0	2–3		2–2	0–3	2–2	1–1	2–0	1–0	0–2	0–1	3–1	1–1	0–0	2–0	0–0
Cosenza	0–1	1–0	1–1	1–2	0–0		1–0	1–0	2–0	2–1	2–4	1–1	0–0	1–2	0–0	1–1	2–1	1–1
Foggia	2–1	3–1	0–2	2–1	2–1	1–2		4–4	2–2	4–1	2–3	0–1	3–1	0–2	0–0	4–0	2–2	5–2
Foligno	0–1	0–1	0–2	2–2	0–1	0–0	2–1		1–4	1–1	1–0	0–1	1–1	1–1	0–0	0–0	2–0	1–1
Gela	2–1	1–2	0–1	0–1	2–1	1–3	2–1	0–0		0–0	3–0	2–1	2–1	1–0	0–0	0–0	0–0	1–1
Juve Stabia	3–1	3–2	1–0	2–1	2–1	2–1	0–2	0–2	0–1		4–1	2–2	1–0	5–0	0–3	2–0	1–0	1–0
Lucchese	1–1	0–2	2–0	1–2	1–0	0–1	4–2	3–0	3–0	0–0		0–0	1–1	4–2	0–1	4–0	0–0	2–0
Nocerina	1–0	2–1	2–1	3–3	0–0	2–1	3–1	3–1	1–0	1–2	2–1		3–2	0–0	1–0	1–0	3–1	1–1
Pisa	2–1	0–2	2–2	1–1	1–0	2–2	1–2	1–0	4–0	1–1	2–0	1–1		2–0	2–1	1–0	1–0	1–1
Siracusa	0–1	0–1	1–0	1–0	1–0	1–1	1–0	2–1	2–0	1–1	1–0	2–0	2–2		1–0	2–2	2–1	0–0
Taranto	3–2	0–1	2–2	3–1	1–0	1–0	2–1	1–3	2–1	1–0	2–1	2–1	2–1	2–2		1–0	1–0	1–1
Ternana	2–3	1–2	2–0	1–3	1–1	0–0	3–2	0–2	2–0	2–1	0–1	0–3	1–0	2–1	3–3		3–2	0–0
Viareggio	0–2	1–1	1–1	1–2	1–1	1–1	0–4	1–3	1–1	0–2	1–1	0–1	1–1	1–0	2–0	1–0		3–1
Virtus Lanciano	1–0	1–0	1–1	1–0	0–2	0–2	5–3	1–2	1–0	1–0	0–0	1–2	1–1	1–0	0–0	0–0	1–2	

Source: Tutto Lega Pro
Legend: Blue = home team win; Yellow = draw; Red = away team win.

=== Play-offs ===
==== Promotion ====
Semifinals
First legs scheduled 29 May 2011; return legs scheduled 5 June 2011

Team 1	Agg.	Team 2	1st leg	2nd leg
Juve Stabia (5)	2–1	(2) Benevento	1–0	1–1
Taranto (4)	3–3	(3) Atletico Roma	0–1	3–2

Aggregate Tie: the higher seed advances

Final
First leg scheduled 12 June 2011; return leg scheduled 19 June 2011

Team 1	Agg.	Team 2	1st leg	2nd leg
Juve Stabia (5)	2–0	(3) Atletico Roma	0–0	2–0

==== Relegation ====
First legs scheduled 29 May 2011; return legs scheduled 5 June 2011

Team 1	Agg.	Team 2	1st leg	2nd leg
Viareggio (17)	4–1	(14) Cosenza	3–1	1–0
Foligno (16)	2–1	(15) Ternana	1–0	1–1

== Supercoppa di Lega di Prima Divisione ==
Season	Home team	Score	Away team	Venue
2010/2011	Gubbio	1 - 1	Nocerina	Stadio Pietro Barbetti, Gubbio
2010/2011	Nocerina	1 - 0	Gubbio	Stadio San Francesco, Nocera Inferiore
2010/2011	Nocerina (group B) won 2-1 on aggregate
