= Marian devotions =

Christian religious practices concerning Mary

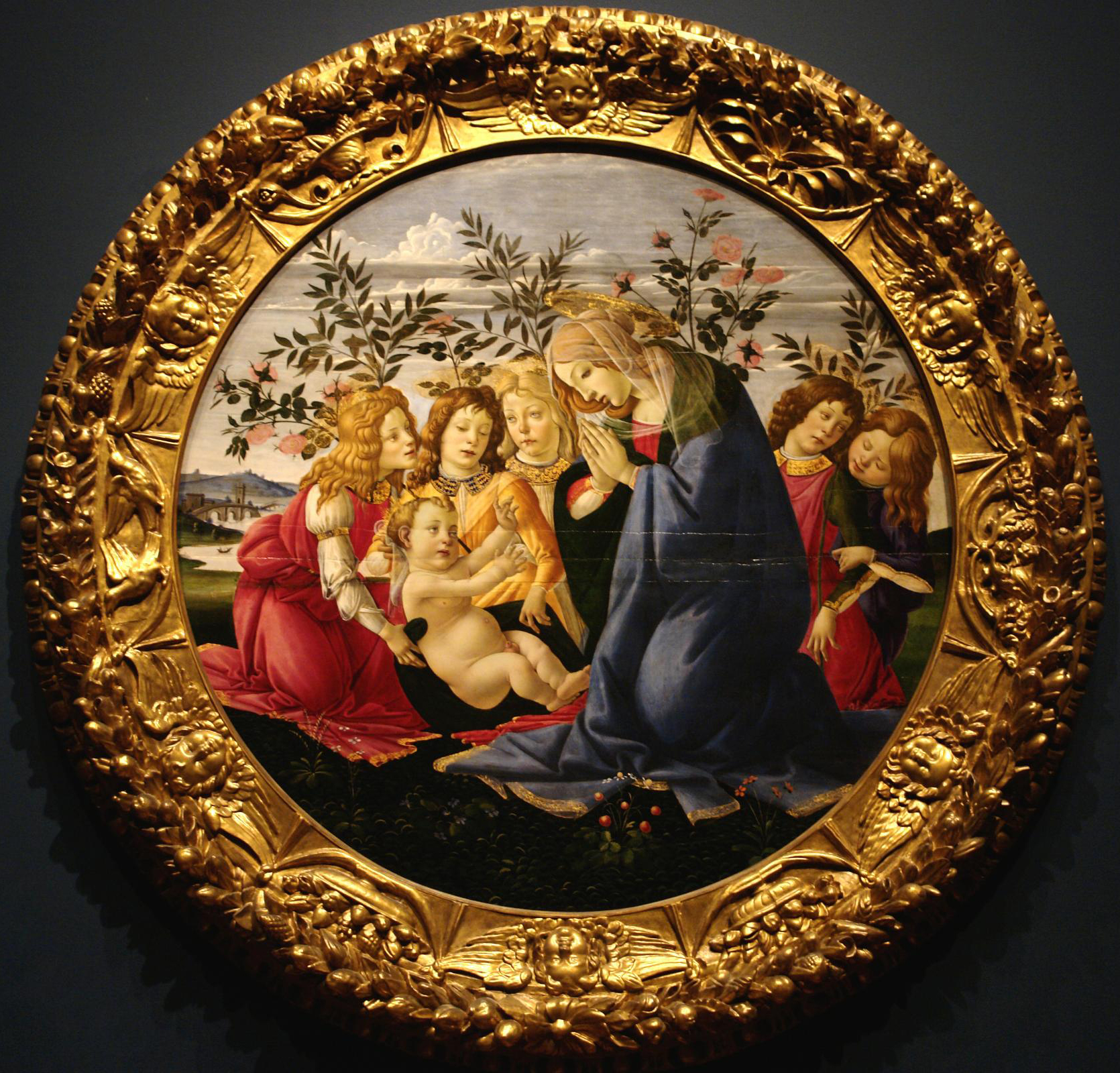
Madonna and Five Angels, Botticelli, c. 1485

Marian devotions are external pious practices directed to the person of Mary, mother of Jesus, by members of certain Christian traditions. They are performed in Catholicism, High Church Lutheranism, Anglo-Catholicism, Eastern Orthodoxy and Oriental Orthodoxy, but other Christian denominations mostly reject them.

Such devotional prayers may be accompanied by specific requests for Mary's intercession with God. There is significant diversity of form and structure in Marian devotions practiced by different groups of Christians. Orthodox Marian devotions are well-defined and closely linked to liturgy, while Catholic practices are wide-ranging—they include multi-day prayers such as novenas, the celebration of canonical coronations granted by the Pope, the veneration of icons in Eastern Christianity, and pious acts which do not involve vocal prayers, such as the wearing of scapulars or maintaining a Mary garden.

Marian devotions are important to the Catholic, Eastern Orthodox, Oriental Orthodox traditions, as well as some Anglicans and Lutherans, but most Protestants do not accept them because they believe such devotions are not widely promoted in the Bible. They believe this devotion may distract attention from Christ. According to practitioners, devotion to the Virgin Mary does not amount to worship, which is reserved for God. Both the Catholic and Orthodox traditions view Mary as subordinate to Christ, but uniquely so, in that she is seen as above all other creatures. In 787, the Second Council of Nicaea affirmed a three-level hierarchy of latria, hyperdulia, and dulia that applies to God, the Virgin Mary, and then to the other saints.

== Anglicanism ==
No single church with universal authority exists within the Anglican Communion; different types of Marian devotions are practiced by various groups of Anglicans with varying degrees of emphasis. Within the Anglican Communion and the Continuing Anglican movement, devotions to the Virgin Mary have more emphasis within High Church and Broad Church parishes than others.

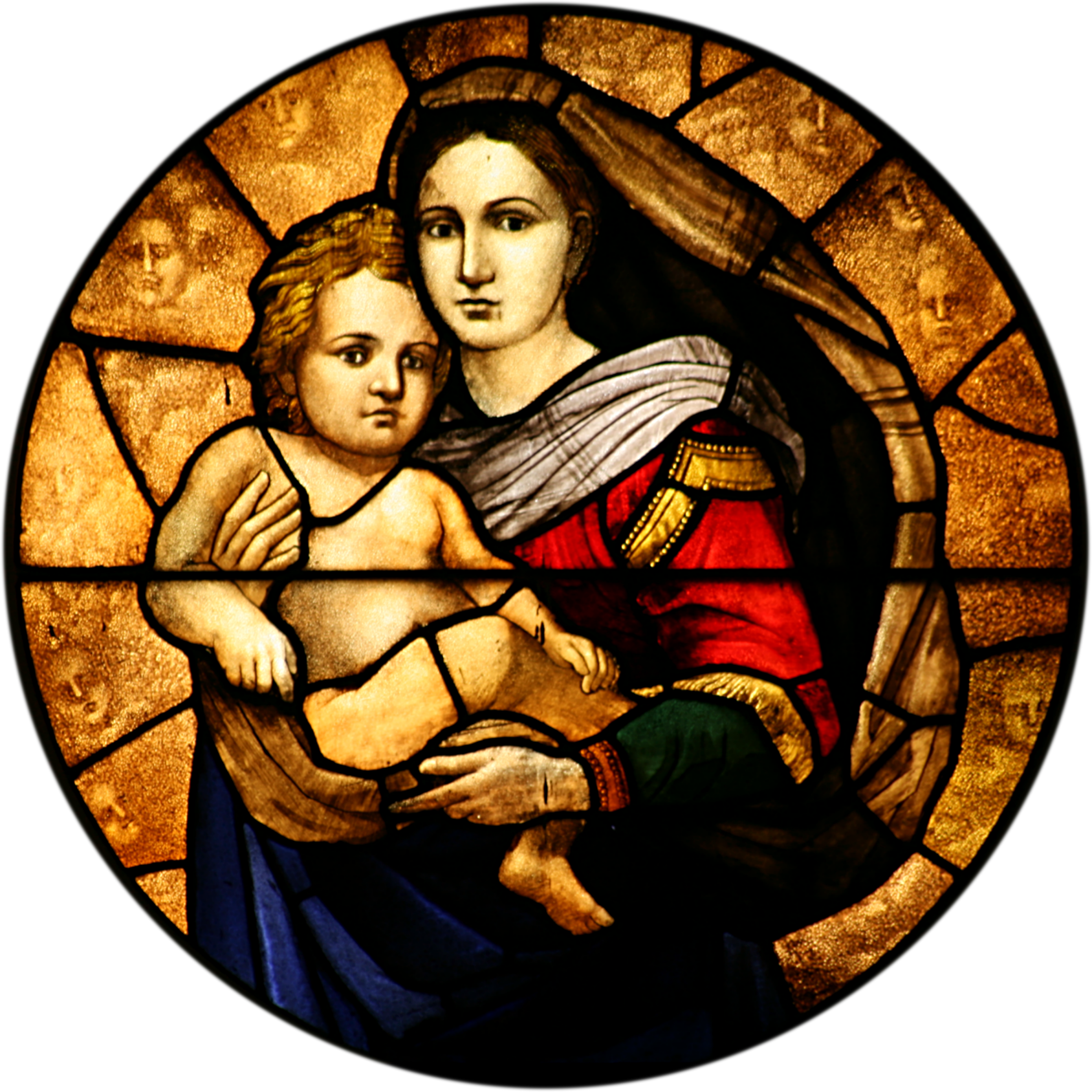
Stained glass depiction of Madonna and Child, St. John's Anglican Church, Ashfield, New South Wales, Australia

The emphasis placed on Mary and Marian devotions changed over the history of Anglicanism. In the 16th century, following the independence of the Church of England from Rome, a movement away from Marian themes took place; by 1552 mentions of Mary had been reduced to only two or three times a day in the Book of Common Prayer but the Marian feasts of the Annunciation and the Purification had been retained. However, in the 17th century, there was a gradual return to Marianism and by 1662 there were five Marian feasts.

British devotion to the Virgin Mary has often been expressed in poetry, Marian hymns, and Carols, e.g., in the 17th-century poems of John Donne and George Herbert, or in the 18th-century works of Thomas Ken such as Saint Mary the Virgin.

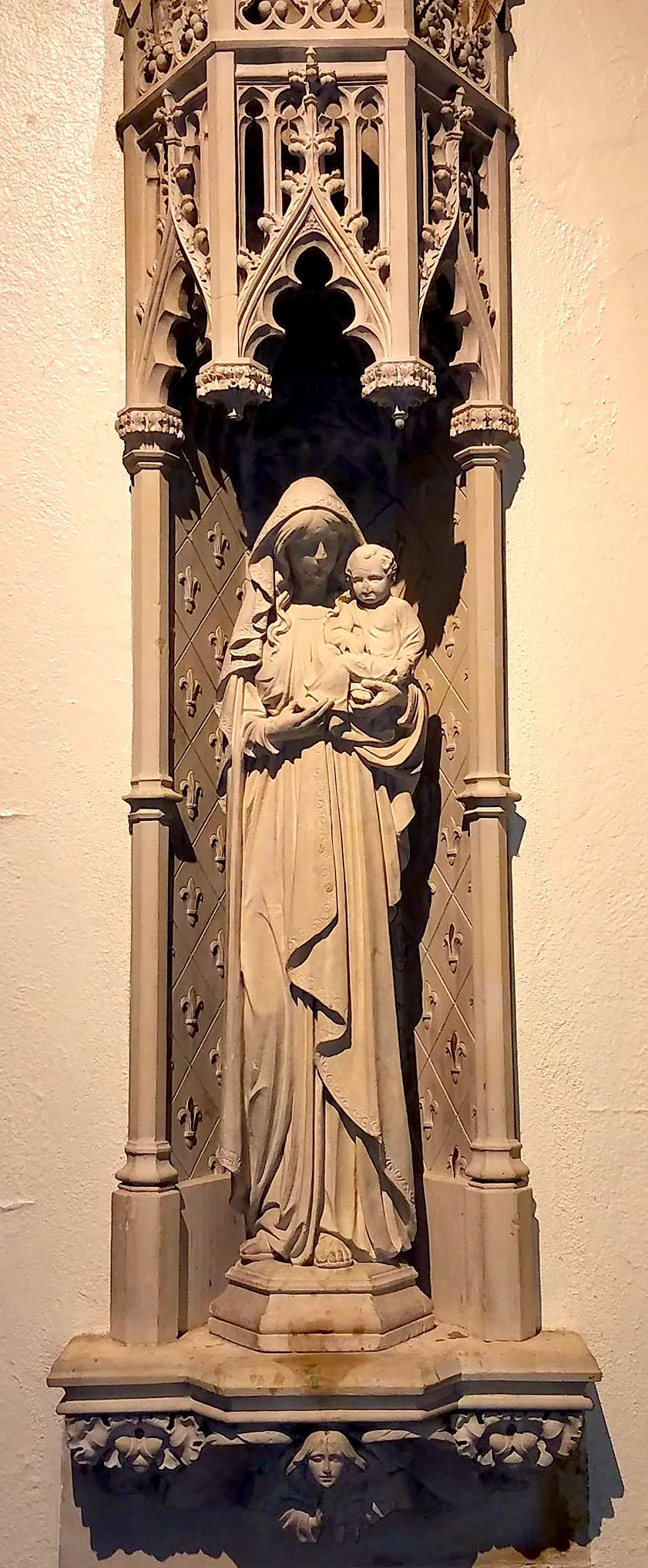
Marian Votive Shrine at the Anglo-Catholic Church of the Good Shepherd (Rosemont, Pennsylvania)

Anglican devotion for the Virgin Mary was revived during the 19th century Oxford Movement of Anglo-Catholicism and by the activities of prominent figures such as John Henry Newman. British theologians such as Father Frederick Faber (who composed several hymns to Mary) took an enthusiastic approach to the promotion of Marian devotions towards the end of the 19th century.

In the liturgical renewal of the 20th century, Mary gained new prominence, and in most Anglican prayer books she is mentioned by name in the Eucharistic prayers. The gradual increase in Marian devotions among Anglicans has also been manifested within the higher levels of the clergy in the Anglican Communion. Archbishop of Canterbury Rowan Williams (who made a 2008 pilgrimage to Our Lady of Lourdes) wrote a book on how to pray with the icons of the Virgin Mary.

Anglican devotions to Mary include the Anglican Rosary (similar to the Catholic rosary), votive candles, and pilgrimages to Walsingham and Lourdes. Some Anglicans, especially Anglo-Catholics, also pray the rosary itself. For centuries, Our Lady of Walsingham has been a centerpiece in Anglican devotions to the Virgin Mary and her feast is celebrated on October 15, as well as a Catholic feast on September 24. Also common in Anglican cathedrals, Anglo-Catholic parishes, and certain Anglican shrines are chapels or side altars dedicated to the Virgin Mary called Lady chapels.

Discussions between Roman Catholics and Anglicans within frameworks such as the Anglican–Roman Catholic International Commission, and with the 2005 publication of the (non-binding) joint statement: Mary: Grace and Hope in Christ, have started a movement towards a closer agreement of Mary and Marian devotions between Catholics and Anglicans.

== Lutheranism ==
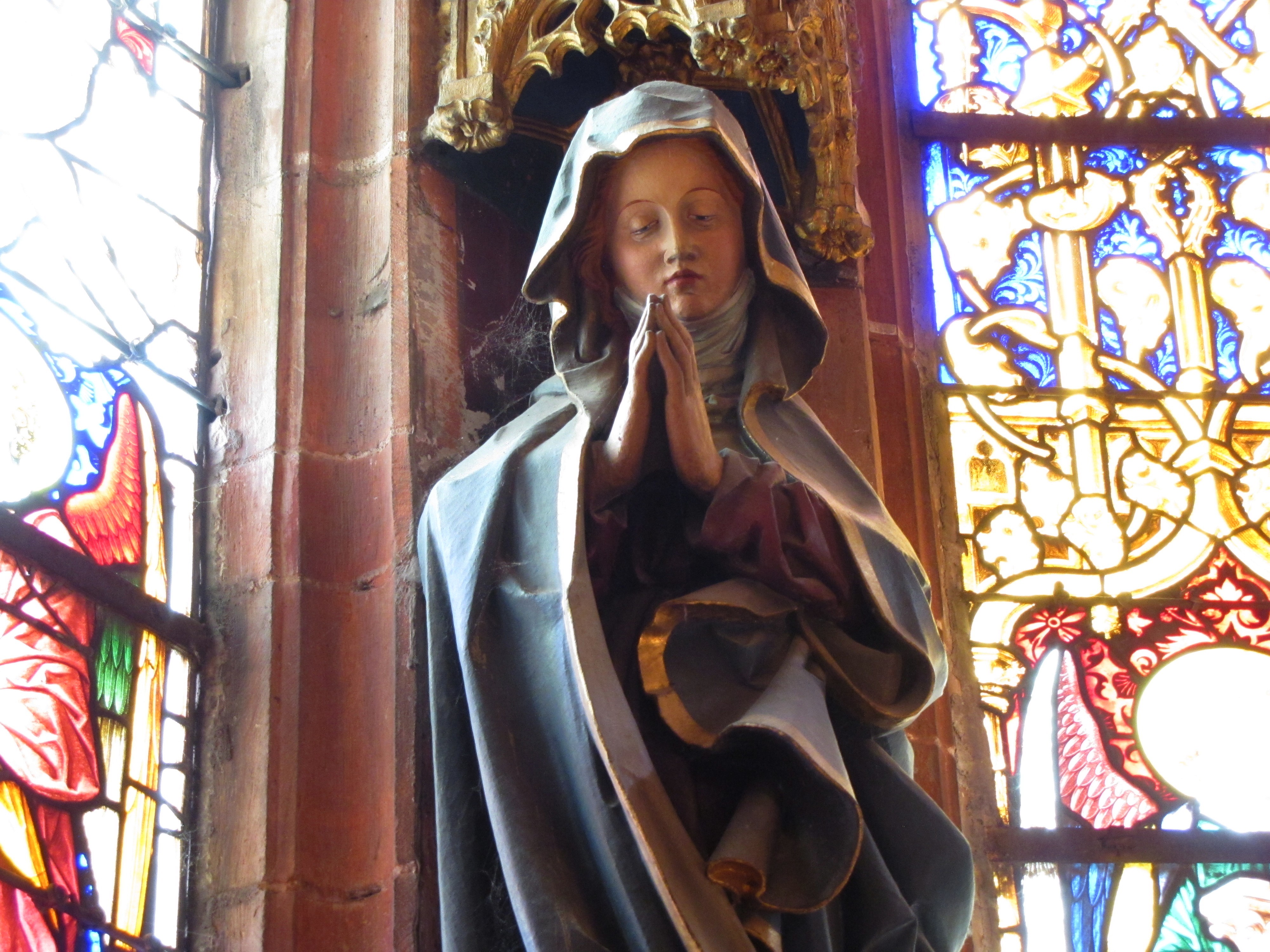
A statue of Mother Mary in the Lutheran church of Saint-Pierre-le-Jeune, Strasbourg

In his 1521 Commentary on the Magnificat, Martin Luther extolled the magnitude of God's grace towards Mother Mary and her own legacy of Christian instruction and example demonstrated in her canticle of praise. This canticle continues to have an important place in the Lutheran Mass.

After the Reformation, on the advice of Martin Luther, Marian paintings and statues continued to adorn many Lutheran Churches.

The pre-Trent version of the Hail Mary (that is, "Hail Mary, full of grace, the Lord is with thee. Blessed art thou among women and blessed is the fruit of thy womb, Jesus.") was retained by Martin Luther as a sign of reverence for and devotion to the Blessed Virgin. The 1522 Betbüchlein (Prayer Book) retained the Ave Maria.

== Eastern Orthodoxy ==
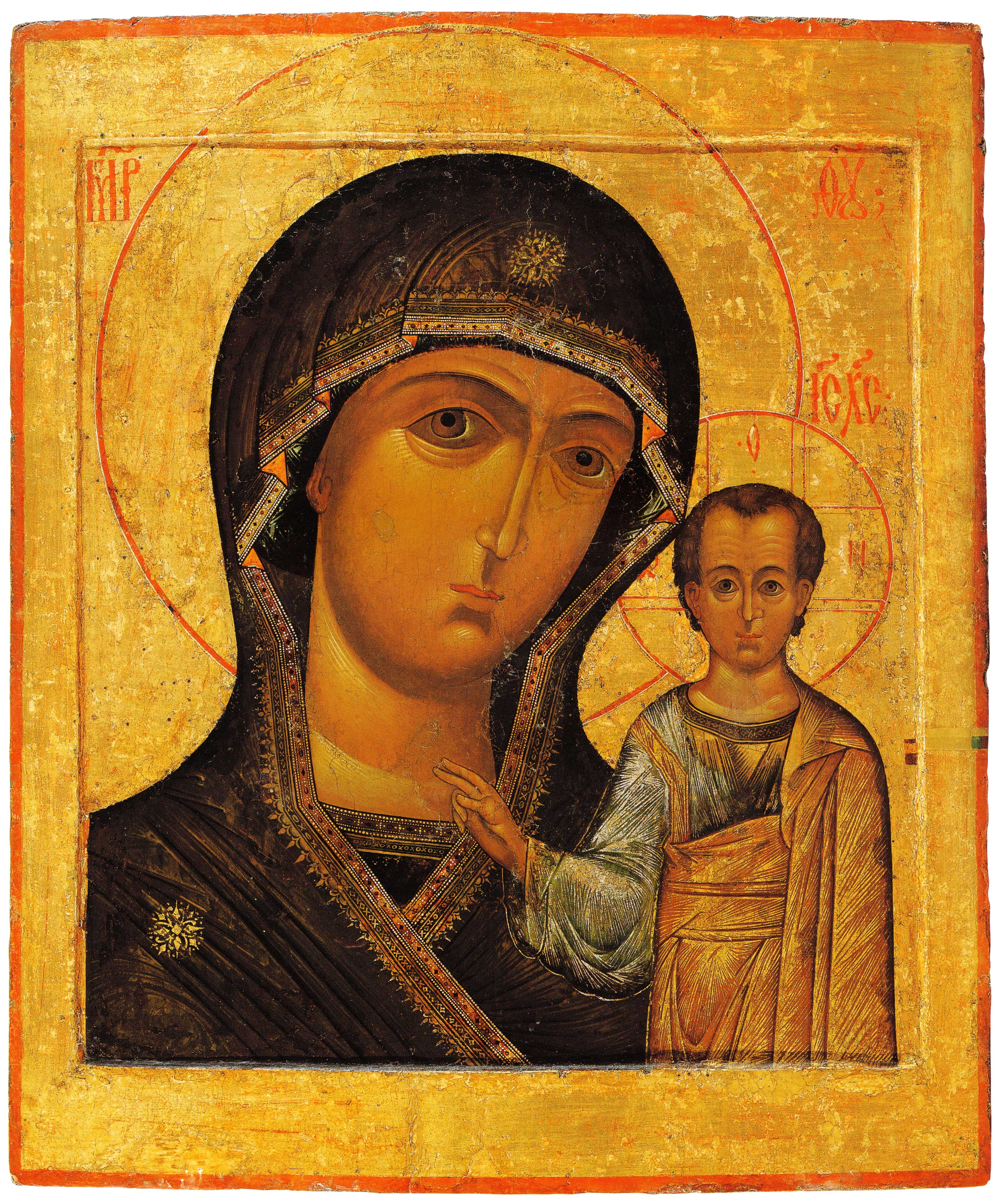
Our Lady of Kazan has been the subject of devotions both in the Catholic Church and in Eastern Orthodoxy.

A deep devotion to the "Aeiparthenos" (i.e., Ever Virgin) Mary is one of the key themes of Orthodox liturgy and spirituality. Devotion to the Virgin Mary is "taken for granted" in Eastern Orthodoxy. It permeates the entire life of the Church and historically required no academic development as in the Western Church.

In the Orthodox view, devotion to Mary is considered an important element of Christian spirituality, and indifference to her by other Christian denominations is troubling to the Orthodox. Orthodox theologian Sergei Bulgakov called denominations that do not venerate the Virgin Mary "another type of Christianity".

The Theotokos (i.e., God-bearer, or Mother of God) title for Mary is very important in Eastern Orthodoxy and is seen as an affirmation of the fullness of God's incarnation.

The Orthodox approach to Marian devotions is characterized by three elements:

- Orthodox understandings of Mary have for centuries been mostly doxological and devotional rather than academic: they have been expressed in Marian hymns, liturgical poetry and the veneration of icons, rather than formal treatises. Marian devotions thus form the nucleolus of Orthodox Mariology.
- Devotions to Mary are far more ingrained and integrated within Orthodox liturgy than in any other Christian traditions, e.g., there are many more hymns to Mary within the Eastern Orthodox yearly cycle of liturgy than in Roman Catholic liturgy. Feasts, icons and hymns are often combined, e.g., the Theotokos Iverskaya "wonder-working" icon is used on its own feast day, and the Akathistos is sung.
- The Orthodox focus on Mary as the Theotokos gives more emphasis to devotions that praise Mary's role in the mystery of Incarnation, rather than other devotions, e.g., those that consider her sorrows at Calvary. Devotions to the Theotokos are often combined with the veneration of icons depicting her with the Child Jesus. For instance, in the Sunday of Orthodoxy the singing of Marian hymns and the veneration of icons reaffirm the identity of Mary as the Theotokos.

The Eastern Orthodox Church considers Mary to have been elevated by God to the highest status, above all other creatures, though still only a human being. The Orthodox hymn Axion Estin speaks of Mary as being "More honorable than the cherubim and more glorious beyond compare than the seraphim." Although most Orthodox consider Mary sinless, they do not accept the Roman Catholic definition of the Immaculate Conception of Mary.

Mary is mentioned numerous times in all of the Divine Services and the Divine Liturgy. The final petition of each ektenia (litany) ends with an invocation of the Virgin Mary. When a series of troparia are chanted, the final one is often a Theotokion (hymn to the Virgin Mary). There are numerous Marian litanies in the Eastern church which may cover a multitude of themes, some dogmatic, others of moral and patriotic character.

Devotions to icons of the Theotokos (often considered miraculous) are common in Eastern Orthodoxy. Many such icons are considered the protector of a region, e.g., Our Lady of Kazan, the Theotokos Fyodorovskaya as the protector of the Upper Volga region and the Theotokos of Tolga as the patroness of Yaroslavl. A number of local (and often ancient) Orthodox Marian devotions also exist around the world, e.g., to the icon of the Theotokos of the Life-giving Spring in present-day Istanbul.

One of the most important Marian devotions is the Akathist to the Theotokos, which is chanted every year during Great Lent, and is frequently chanted throughout the year as a private devotion. Some people chant the Akathist as part of their preparation for Holy Communion. A metrical translation of an ancient Orthodox prayer is found in the second verse of the Anglican hymn, Ye Watchers and Ye Holy Ones.

== Catholicism ==
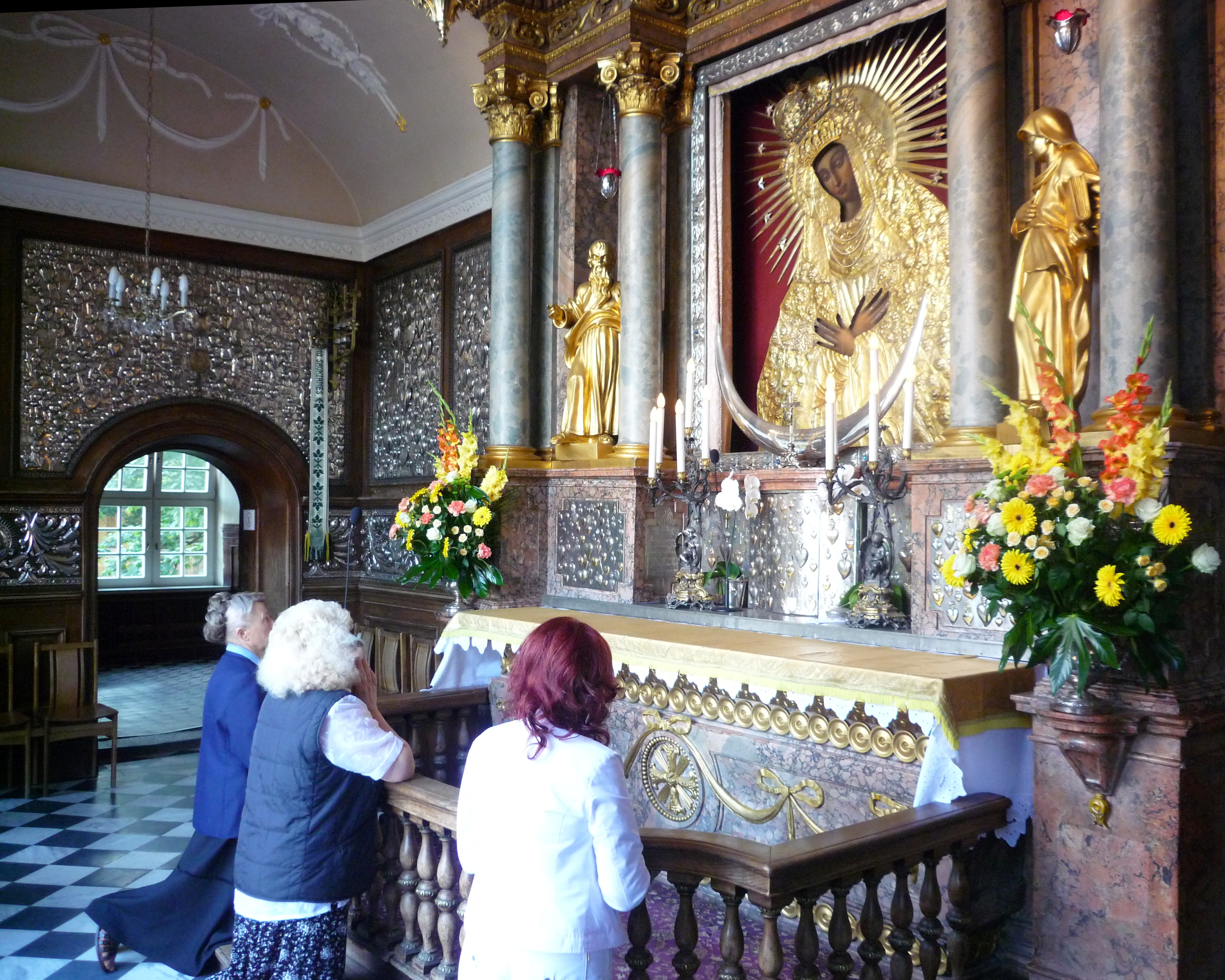
Praying before Our Lady of the Gate of Dawn in Vilnius, Lithuania

At the popular level, for centuries books such as True Devotion to Mary have built a ground swell of Marian devotions among Catholics, to the point that tens of millions of pilgrims visit Marian shrines every year. The statue of Our Lady of Zapopan attracts over one million pilgrims on 12 October each year as the statue travels through the streets moving from one cathedral to another.

Marian devotions can take a unifying national dimension, e.g., devotion to Our Lady of Guadalupe is a national symbol in Mexico, and in 1979 Pope John Paul II placed Mexico under her protection. Similarly, national devotions to Our Lady of Šiluva resulted in Lithuania being formally consecrated to Mary by Cardinal Sladkevicius and the Chairman of the Lithuanian Parliament, in September 1991.

Marian devotions are also associated with a number of beliefs among Catholics which have not been dogmatically approved by the Church, but have been asserted by saints and theologians. An example is the belief that devotion to Mary is a sign of predestination. Saint Bernard of Clairvaux in the 12th century, Saint Bonaventure in the 13th century, and Saint Alphonsus Liguori in the 18th century affirmed this belief, and 20th century theologian Reginald Garrigou-Lagrange, who taught Pope John Paul II, supported it with modern theological arguments regarding the "signs of predestination".

After a century of growing emphasis on Marian devotions, the Second Vatican Council (1962–1965), in Sacrosanctum Concilium, #13, sought to give guidance on the place of devotion to Mary in Christian piety:

Devotions should be so drawn up that they harmonize with the liturgical seasons, accord with the sacred liturgy, are in some fashion derived from it, and lead the people to it, since, in fact, the liturgy by its very nature far surpasses any of them.

=== Types of devotions ===
Marian devotions among Roman Catholics are varied and have diverse cultural dimensions. While there are many well-known devotions, there are many small, local and regional devotions.

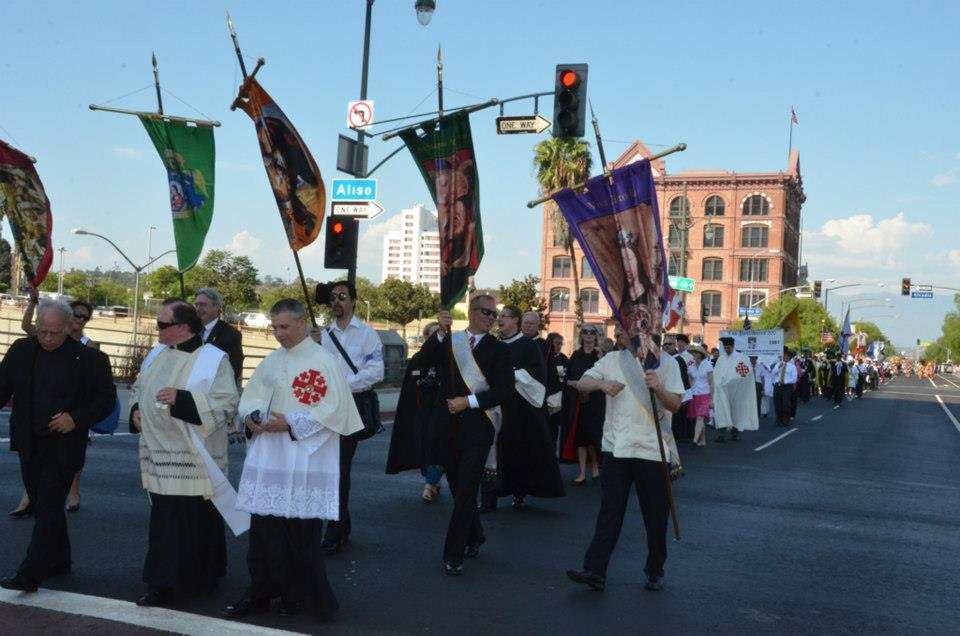
Annual Grand Marian Procession through Downtown Los Angeles

==== Examples ====
Some devotions relate to particular episodes in the life of the Virgin Mary, such as the Seven Sorrows of Mary and the Seven Joys of Mary. Others have developed from purported apparitions such as Our Lady of the Hens, Our Lady of Guadalupe, Our Lady of Lourdes, or Our Lady of Fatima. Various icons, images and statues of the Virgin have been associated with reports of miraculous events such as healings and have resulted in local and national devotions and the construction of Marian shrines. Examples include the Black Madonna of Częstochowa in Poland, and Our Lady of the Gate of Dawn in Lithuania. Among devotional articles, probably the most common are the scapular of Our Lady of Mount Carmel, the icon of Our Lady of the Hens and the "Miraculous Medal". Its origins go back to 1830.

Regional devotions continue to generate local support such as festivals and celebrations. The feast of Our Lady of the Hens and the festival of Our Lady of Solitude of Porta Vaga in the Philippines have been celebrated for centuries, and their icons continue to be venerated. Each year around Pentecost, as part of a local Marian devotion, about a million people attend the Romería de El Rocío in Spain.

Many other forms of devotional expression take place. For example, there has also been the long-established practice of dedicating side altars in Catholic churches, often called Lady Chapels, to Mary.

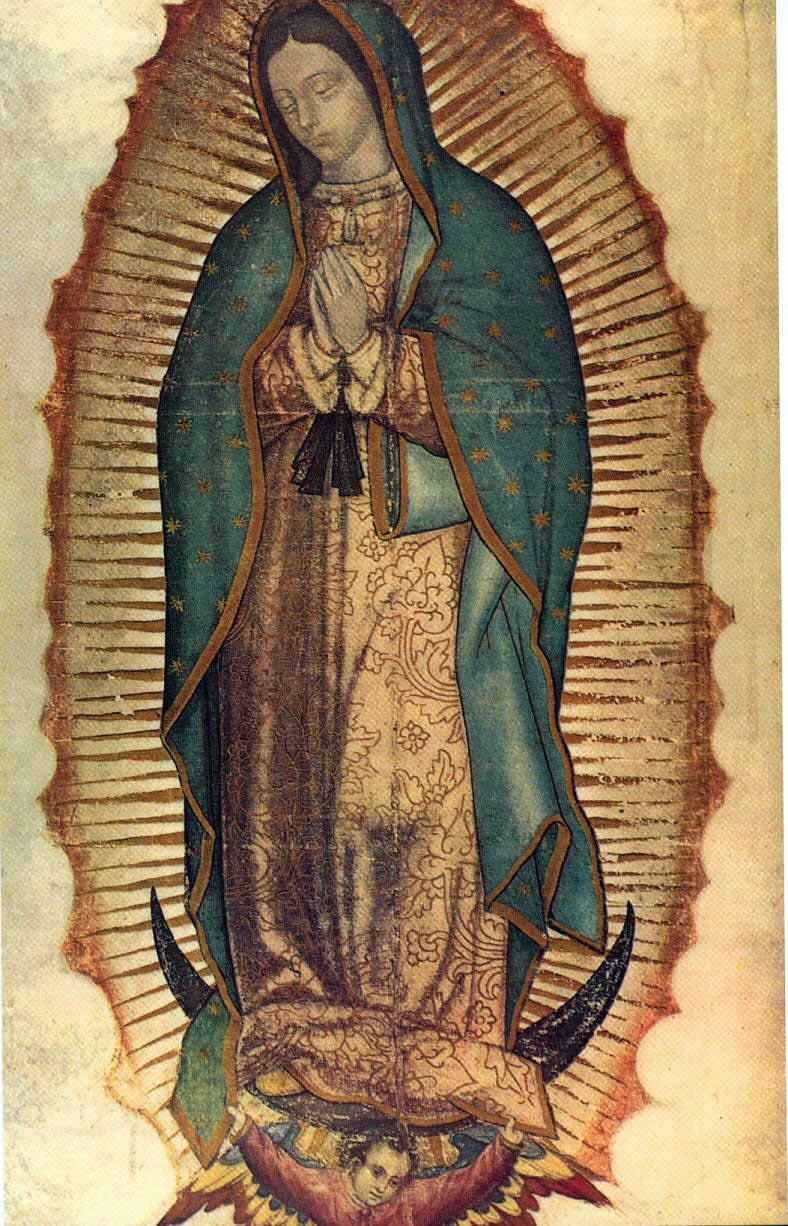
Our Lady of Guadalupe Mexico

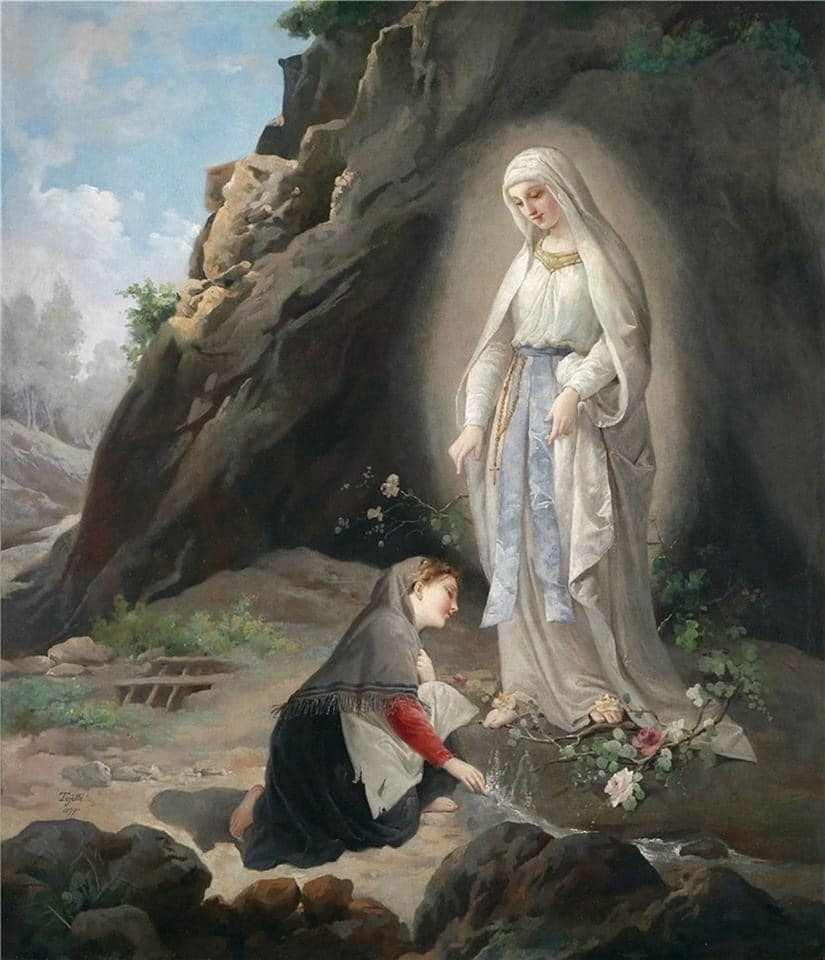
Notre Dame de Lourdes France

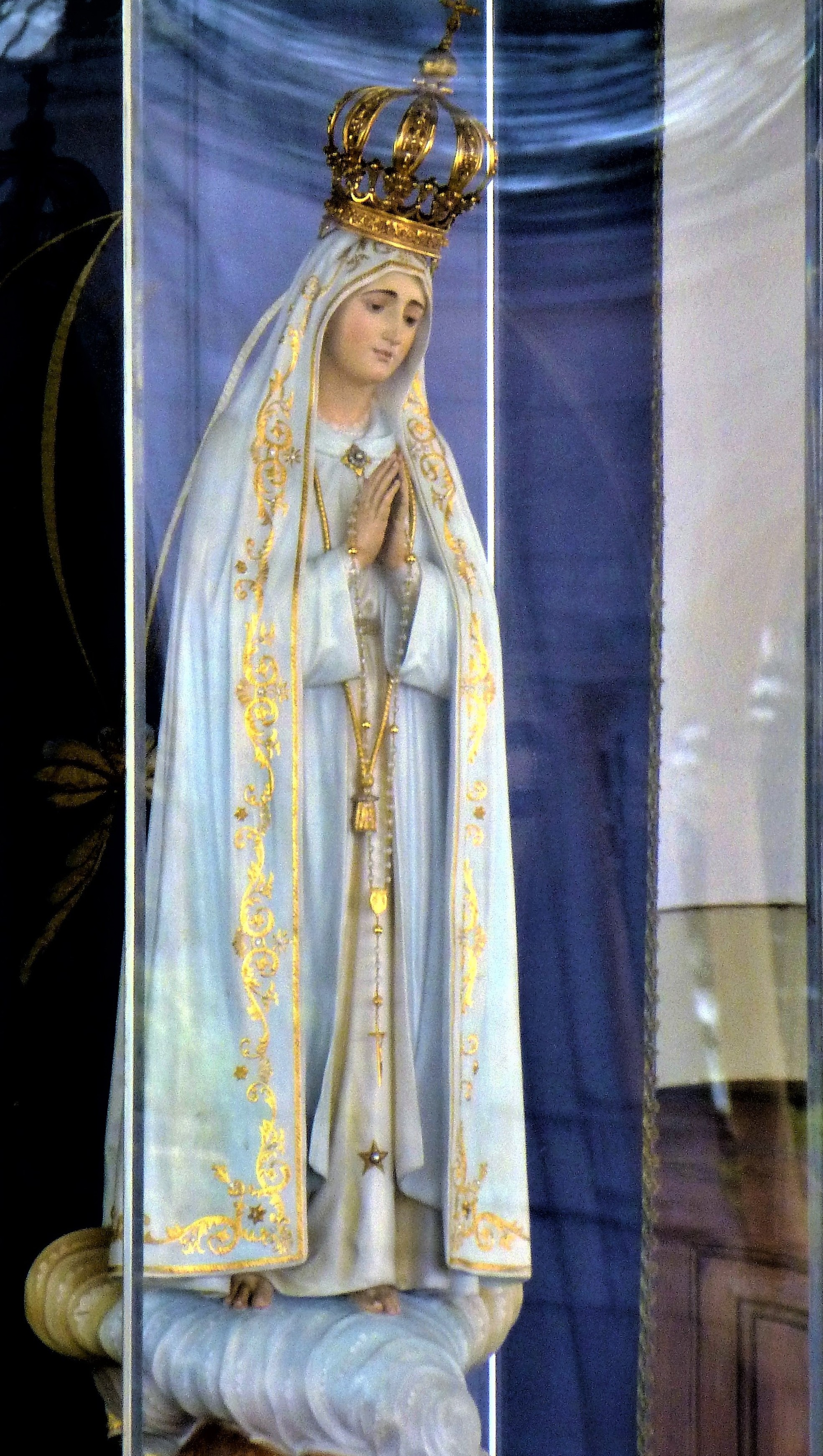
Our Lady of the Holy Rosary of Fátima Portugal

== See also ==
- Consecration and entrustment to Mary
- Mary in Islam
- Procession § Christian processions
- Devotions in Honor of the Blessed Virgin Mary, from With God: A Book of Prayers and Reflections by Rev. F. X. Lasance, 1911

== Sources ==
- Anderson, H. George; Stafford, J. Francis; Burgess, Joseph A., eds. (1992). The One Mediator, The Saints, and Mary. Lutherans and Catholics in Dialogue. Vol. VIII. Minneapolis: Augsburg. ISBN 0-8066-2579-1.
- Duckworth, Penelope (2004). Mary: The Imagination of Her Heart. ISBN 1-56101-260-2.
- Josemaria, Brother Anthony (2008). The Blessed Virgin Mary in England. ISBN 978-0-595-50074-1.
- Mary: Grace and Hope in Christ: The Seattle Statement of the Anglican-Roman Catholics. Anglican/Roman Catholic International Group. 2006. ISBN 0-8264-8155-8.
- McNally, Terrence (2009). What Every Catholic Should Know about Mary. ISBN 978-1-4415-1051-8.
- Schroedel, Jenny (2006). The Everything Mary Book. ISBN 1-59337-713-4.
- "Veneration of the Holy Mother of God". Directory on Popular Piety and the Liturgy. Vatican City: Congregation for Divine Worship and the Discipline of the Sacraments. 2001.
- Collaborative World Map with Marian devotion places pilgrimage sites, churches, grotto, cloisters, chapels.
