= Daughters of Charity =

Daughters of Charity refers to:

- Daughters of Charity of Saint Vincent de Paul
- Daughters of Charity of the Sacred Heart of Jesus
- Canossians, "Canossian Daughters of Charity, Servants of the Poor"
- Daughters of Charity of the Most Precious Blood

== See also ==
- Daughters of Divine Charity
- Missionaries of Charity
- Sisters of Charity
