= Lucas dos Santos =

Brazilian footballer born 1995

Personal information
- Full name: Lucas dos Santos Parize
- Date of birth: 8 May 1995 (age 31)
- Place of birth: Lima, Peru
- Height: 1.79 m (5 ft 10 in)
- Positions: Midfielder; forward

Youth career
- São Paulo
- Ponte Preta
- 2010–2012: AABB São Paulo
- 2013–2014: Waldhof Mannheim
- 2014: Fortuna Köln

Senior career*
Years	Team	Apps	(Gls)
2015	Latino Munich	9	(13)
2016	Anadolu Bayern	13	(2)
2018	Sport Victoria	4	(0)
2019	Los Caimanes	0	(0)
Total		26	(15)
- * Club domestic league appearances and goals

Lucas dos Santos Parize (born 8 May 1995) is a former Peruvian footballer who played as a midfielder.

== Early and personal life ==
Born in Lima, Peru, dos Santos is the son of former Brazilian footballer Marquinho, during his father's time with Alianza Lima. Following his retirement as a player, dos Santos helped his father set up a YouTube channel, named "Tiro Libre" (Free Kick).

== Club career ==
dos Santos began his career in the academies of Brazilian sides São Paulo and Ponte Preta. In 2013, he emigrated to Germany, joining the academy of Waldhof Mannheim, where he spent a season and a half. After a brief spell with Fortuna Köln in early 2014, a collapsed move to SV Pullach saw him train instead with SC Pfullendorf, representing the club in friendly games.

In 2015 he dropped down to the tenth division of German football, signing for Latino Munich. After nine games, in which he scored thirteen goals, he moved to Bezirksliga Oberbayern-Süd side Anadolu Bayern.

He later returned to Peru, joining Segunda División side Sport Victoria in 2018. However, he only managed four appearances for the club before joining fellow Segunda División side Los Caimanes in 2019. However, he failed to make an appearance for Los Caimanes, and ended his career having left the club at the end of the season.

== International career ==
dos Santos was eligible to represent both Brazil and Peru at international level. While training in Germany, he expressed his desire to be called up to then-manager of the Peru under-20 side, Víctor Rivera.

He represented Brazil at the 2019 Summer Universiade, scoring once in a 3–0 win over South Africa, as Brazil finished the tournament as runners-up to Japan.

== Career statistics ==
=== Club ===
Appearances and goals by club, season and competition
Club	Season	League			Cup		Other		Total	
Club	Season	Division	Apps	Goals	Apps	Goals	Apps	Goals	Apps	Goals
Latino Munich	2015–2016	A-Klasse 4	9	13	0	0	0	0	9	13
Anadolu Bayern	2015–2016	Bezirksliga Oberbayern-Süd	13	2	0	0	0	0	13	2
Sport Victoria	2018	Peruvian Segunda División	4	0	0	0	0	0	4	0
Los Caimanes	2019	Liga 2	0	0	0	0	0	0	0	0
Career total			26	15	0	0	0	0	26	15
