= Shrine of Our Lady of the Hens =

Roman Catholic shrine in Campania, Italy

Shrine of Saint Mary the Crowned of Carmel called Our Lady/Madonna of the Hens
- Santuario di Santa Maria Incoronata del Carmine detta Madonna delle Galline
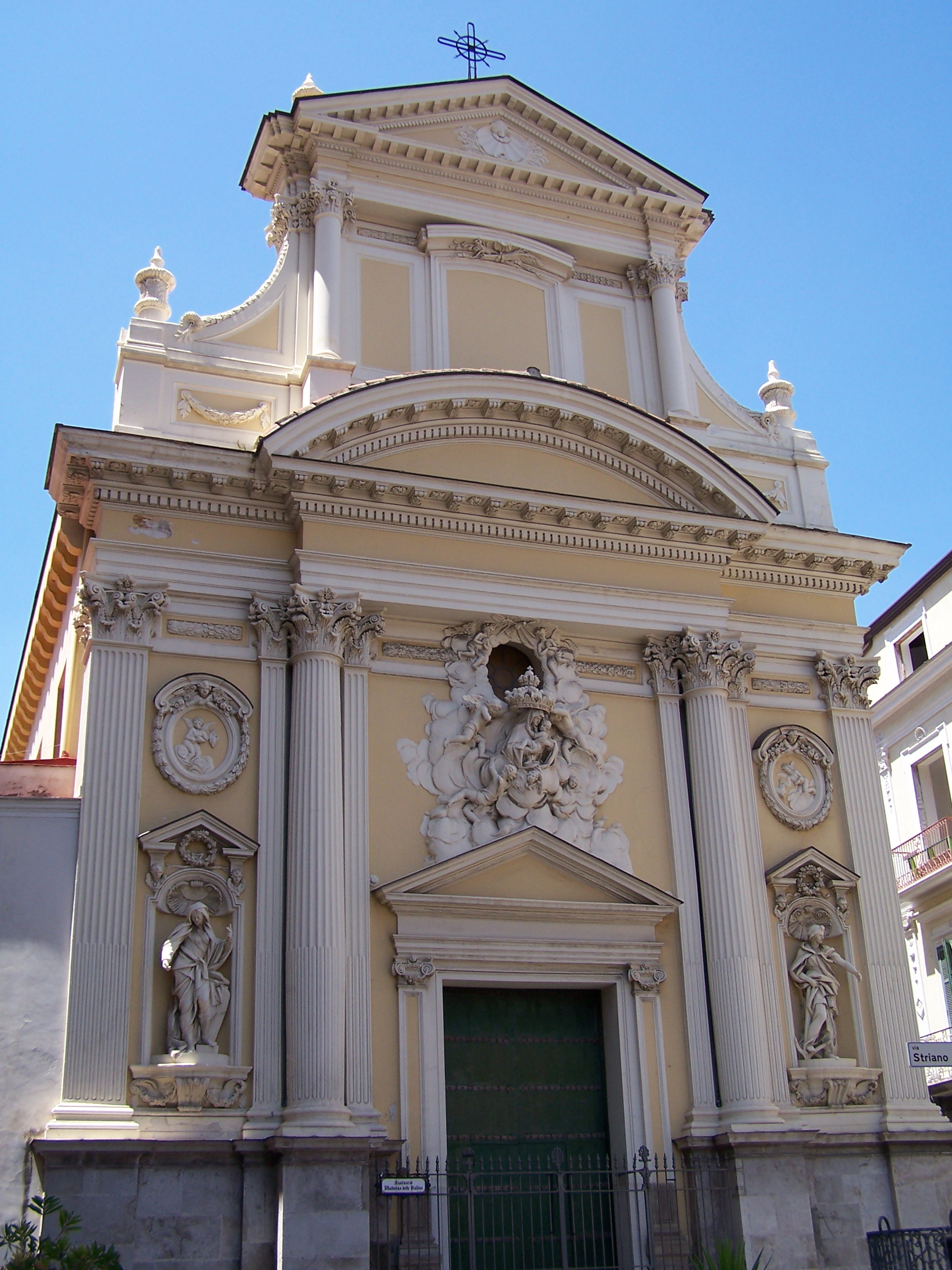
- Façade of the shrine

Religion
- Affiliation: Catholic Church
- Diocese: Diocese of Nocera Inferiore-Sarno
- Province: Archdiocese of Salerno-Campagna-Acerno
- Region: Campania
- Rite: Roman Rite
- Festival: Feast of Our Lady of the Hens
- Ecclesiastical or organizational status: Shrine
- Patron: Our Lady of the Hens
- Year consecrated: 1615
- Status: Active

Location
- Location: Pagani, Campania, Italy
- Interactive map of Shrine of Saint Mary the Crowned of Carmel called Our Lady/Madonna of the Hens
- Coordinates: 40.740825°N 14.618820000000028°E

Architecture
- Type: Church
- Style: Baroque
- Groundbreaking: 1610
- Completed: 1615 ca.
- Direction of façade: East

The Shrine of Saint Mary the Crowned of Carmel (Italian: Santuario di Santa Maria Incoronata del Carmine), also called Shrine of Our Lady of the Hens (Italian: Santuario della Madonna delle Galline), is a Roman Catholic Marian shrine located in Pagani, Campania, annually hosting the feast of Our Lady of the Hens.

== See also ==
- Catholic Marian church buildings
- Shrines to the Virgin Mary
