= Daughters of Charity of the Most Precious Blood =

The Daughters of Charity of the Most Precious Blood is a congregation established on 6 January 1873 in the town of Pagani in Italy by Thomas Marie Fusco (1 December 1831 – 24 February 1891).
