= Feast of Our Lady of the Hens =

Italian festival on the Second Sunday of Easter

Feast of Saint Mary the Crowned of Carmel
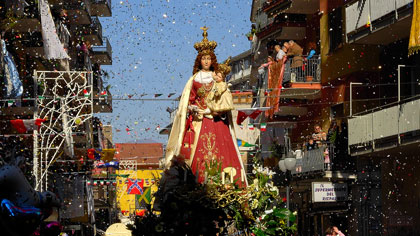
- Official name: Italian: Festa di Santa Maria Incoronata del Carmine, lit. 'Feast of Saint Mary the Crowned of Carmel'
- Also called: Italian: Festa della Madonna delle Galline, lit. 'Feast of Our Lady of the Hens'
- Observed by: Christians
- Type: Cultural, Historical, Christian
- Significance: Patronal festival of Our Lady of the Hens: commemoration of the finding of the miraculous Marian icon
- Celebrations: Church services, processions, public outdoor banquets, tammurriatas, firework shows, gift giving of birds and traditional food to the Madonna
- Begins: Easter Friday
- Ends: Next Monday
- Date: Second Sunday of Easter
- 2025 date: 27 April
- 2026 date: 12 April
- 2027 date: 4 April
- 2028 date: 23 April
- Duration: 4 days
- Frequency: annual
- First time: 17th century
- Related to: Easter; feast of Saint Alphonsus

The feast of Saint Mary the Crowned of Carmel, commonly known as Our Lady of the Hens or Madonna of the Hens (Italian: Madonna delle Galline), is a religious and civil festival annually celebrated in Pagani, Campania.

== History ==
Popular tradition has it that a wooden panel depicting the Virgin of Carmel was kept in a church perched in the mountains of Tramonti (lit. 'among mountains'); one night, the Madonna appeared to the sacristan in a dream, asking him to tell the priest to repair the crumbling church, otherwise she would have gone away, to a town where "even the hens" would have loved her. The sacristan reported everything to the priest, but the latter took it lightly; the consequences were serious: there was, in fact, a strong storm, and the mud carried the painting with it downstream, to the territory of the municipality of Pagani.

In the 16th century, on the Octave Day of Easter, some hens, scratching in a chicken coop, brought to light the small wooden panel. (Note: This would explain the custom, preserved until today, of giving, during the feast that is celebrated on the Octave Day of Easter, hens or other courtyard animals to the Madonna.)

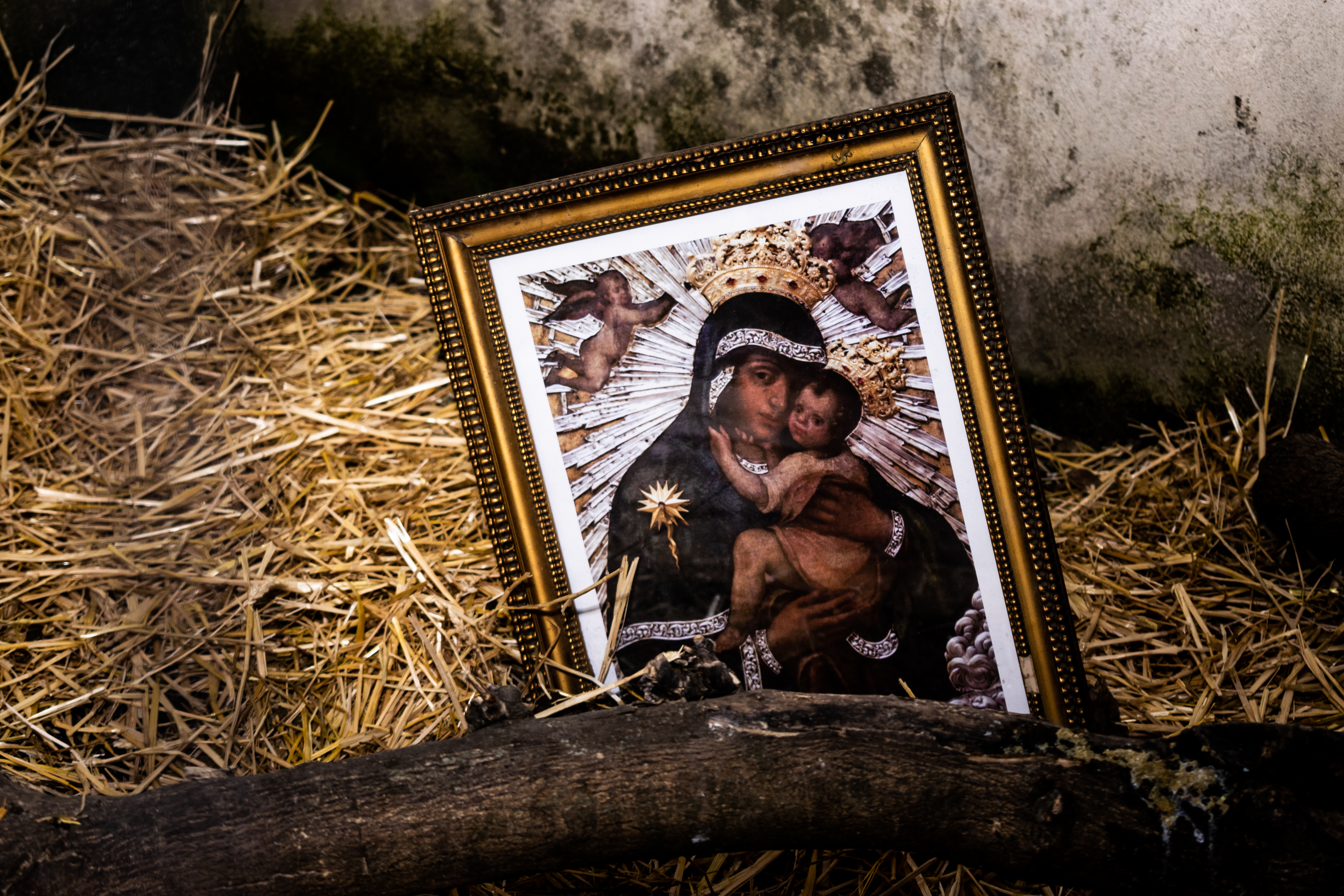
Reproduction of the wooden panel

The image is said to have performed eight miracles. It all began in 1609, when a cripple, who had fallen asleep in front of a dressing room belonging to the ancient parish of San Felice, where the panel found by the hens was kept, saw the Madonna in his sleep; she invited him to get up and throw away his crutches because he was healed. The evident miracle attracted general attention to the small oratory, and in a very short time there were new healings: between 1609 and 1610 there were seven other miracles that confirmed in the faithful the devotion to the 'Madonna of the Hens' in and out of the Agro nocerino-sarnese.

It was then decided the building of a more worthy church to welcome the faithful, and in 1610 Msgr. Lunadoro, bishop of Nocera de' Pagani, tells us that "thanks to the help of the devout people, who give large alms, a much more capable church is begun" to be built in the place where the hens had found the panel. The work had to proceed very quickly considering that Msgr. Stefano de Vicari, in his pastoral visit made in 1615, speaks of a 'newly built church' (Latin: ecclesia noviter erecta).

Due to the deterioration of the original painting, the image was reproduced on canvas and placed in this purpose-built church, namely the Shrine of Our Lady of the Hens.

In August 1786 the diocesan bishop, Msgr. Benedetto dei Monti Sanfelice, published a decree with which the chapter of Saint Peter in the Vatican decided to solemnly crown the 'Madonna delle Galline' in gratitude for the protection of Mary to the population. The coronation ceremony took place in 1787.

== Celebration ==
At dawn on Monday, the tammorrari, engaged for three days and three nights to play and dance in the toselli, go in procession to the sanctuary, where they deposit their instruments at the feet of the Virgin and, thanking her, make an act of submission, and then, without ever turning your back to the altar, leave the sanctuary singing the ancient popular song Madonna de la Grazia.

== Traditional food ==
Along with the typical Easter food, like tortano or casatiello, the traditional dishes of this festival are tagliolini with ragù (meat sauce), savory pies and grilled stuffed artichokes – barbecued on the furnacella (Neapolitan, literally 'little furnace'), a traditional outdoor cooking device, basically a square charcoal barbecue grill.

By eating the aforementioned tagliolini, tradition has it that you stain your shirt with the meat sauce. The stain is called schizzetto, that is 'little sketch' in Italian.

== Recognition ==
The Central Institute for Demoethnoanthropology has recognized the event as an Intangible Cultural Heritage of Italy (Italian: Patrimonio immateriale d'Italia).

== Gallery ==
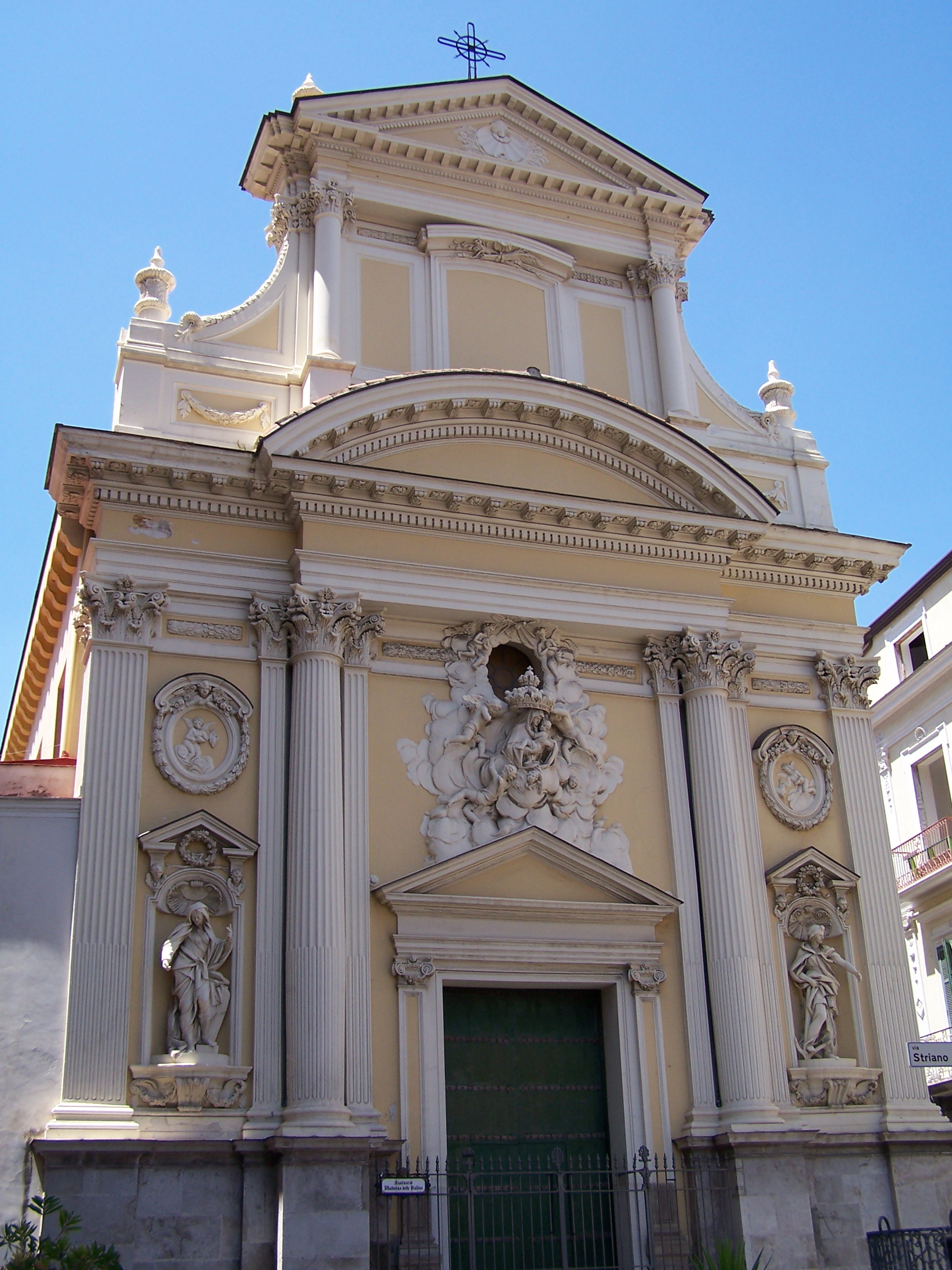

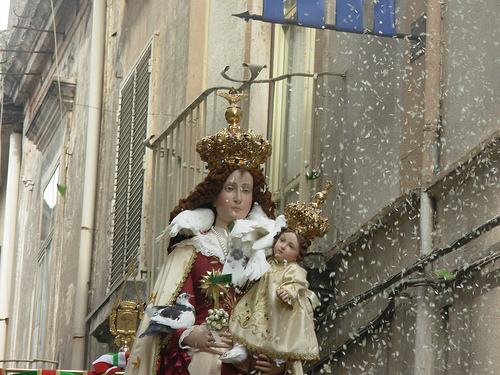

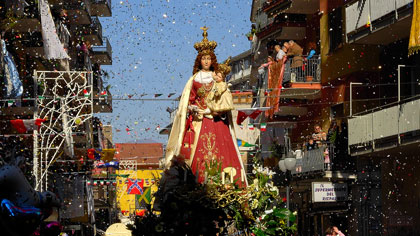

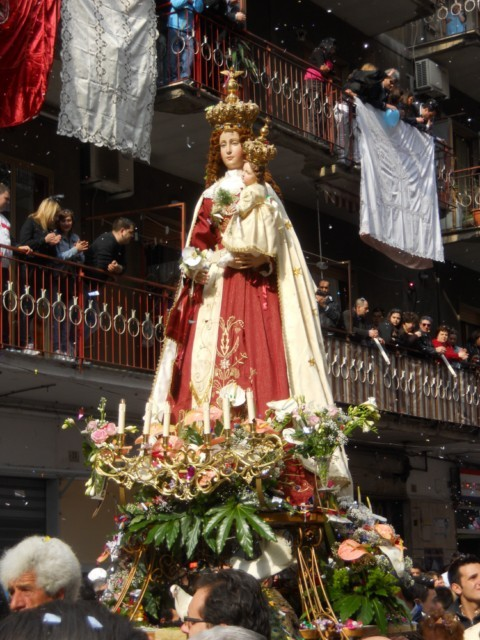

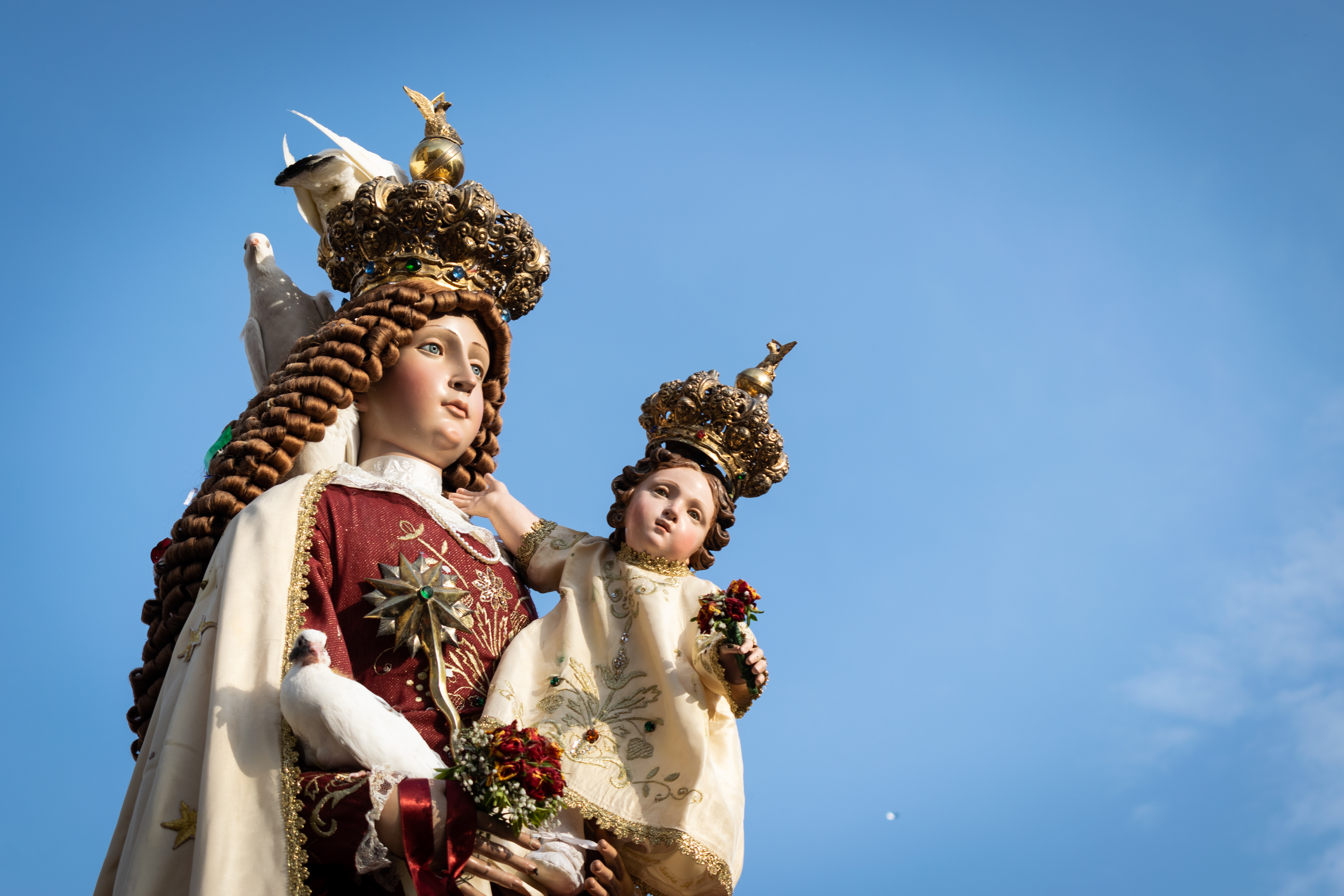

== See also ==
- Archconfraternity of Our Lady of the Hens
- Shrine of Our Lady of the Hens
