= Our Lady of the Hens =

Title of Mary, mother of Jesus, related to her alleged apparitions in Pagani, Campania

Our Lady of the Hens: Madonna of the Hens; Saint Mary the Crowned
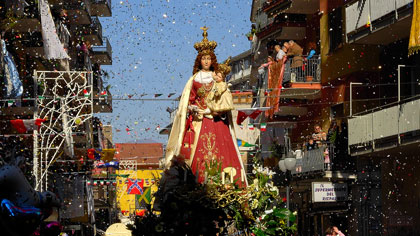
- Location: Pagani, Campania
- Date: 17th century (1609–1610)
- Type: Marian apparition
- Approval: 1610, during the pontificate of Pope Paul V, by bishop Simone Lunadoro; 1786, during the pontificate of Pope Pius VI, by bishop Benedetto dei Monti Sanfelice and the chapter of Saint Peter in the Vatican (canonical coronation)
- Shrine: Shrine of Our Lady of the Hens
- Patronage: Pagani, Campania
- Feast day: Feast of Our Lady of the Hens (Second Sunday of Easter)

Our Lady of the Hens or Madonna of the Hens (Italian: Madonna delle Galline) is a Roman Catholic title of the Blessed Virgin Mary venerated in honour of the Marian apparitions and miracles that are claimed to have occurred between 1609 and 1610 in Pagani, Campania. A large cult devotion has since developed, and a large church was built at the site that has since become a major site of Marian pilgrimage.

== History ==
Popular tradition has it that a wooden panel depicting the Virgin of Carmel was kept in a church perched in the mountains of Tramonti (lit. 'among mountains'); one night, the Madonna appeared to the sacristan in a dream, asking him to tell the priest to repair the crumbling church, otherwise she would have gone away, to a town where "even the hens" would have loved her. The sacristan reported everything to the priest, but the latter took it lightly; the consequences were serious: there was, in fact, a strong storm, and the mud carried the painting with it downstream, to the territory of the municipality of Pagani.

In the 16th century, on the Octave Day of Easter, some hens, scratching in a chicken coop, brought to light the small wooden panel. (Note: This would explain the custom, preserved until today, of giving, during the feast that is celebrated on the Octave Day of Easter, hens or other courtyard animals to the Madonna.)

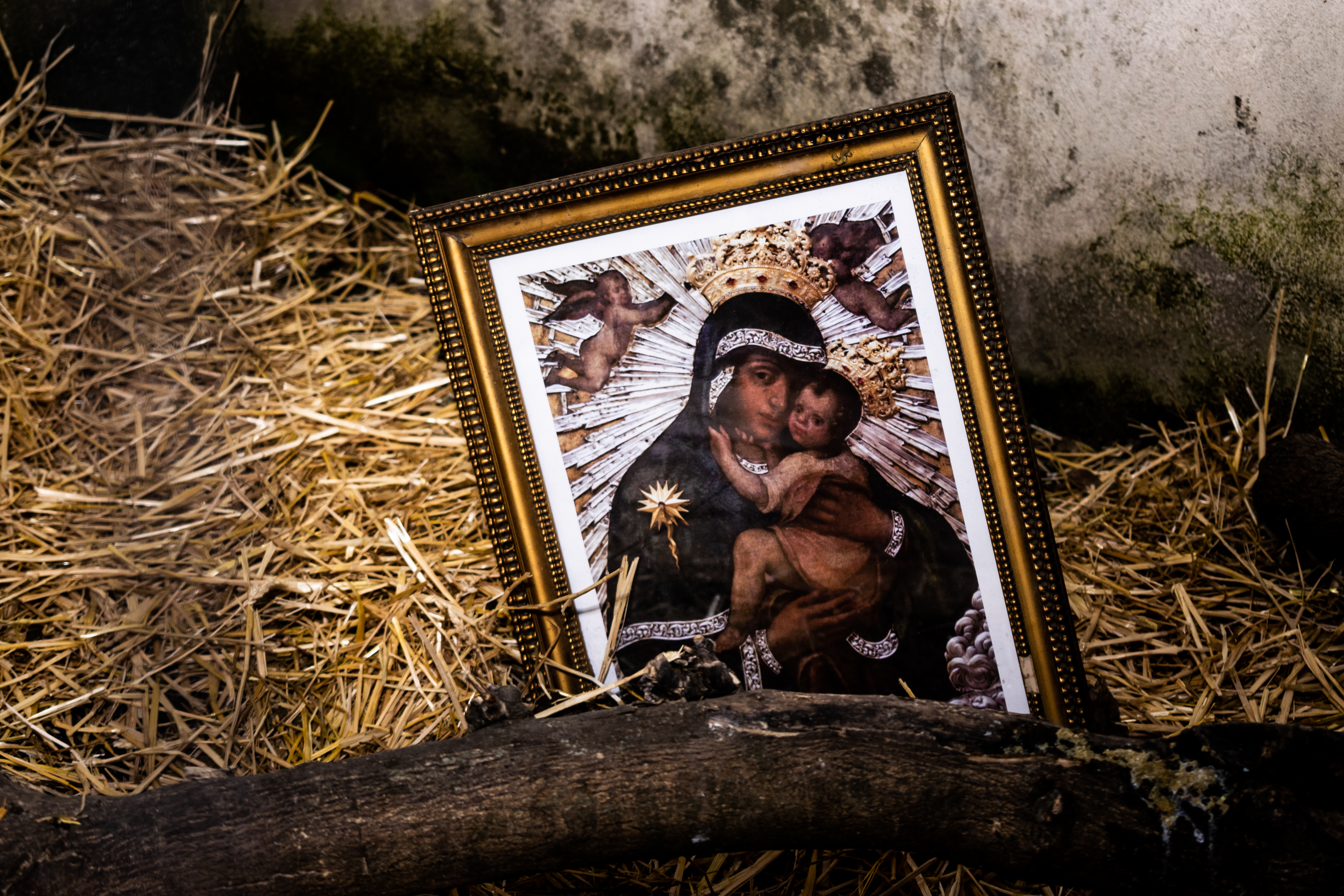
Reproduction of the wooden panel

The image is said to have performed eight miracles. It all began in 1609, when a cripple, who had fallen asleep in front of a dressing room belonging to the ancient parish of San Felice, where the panel found by the hens was kept, saw the Madonna in his sleep; she invited him to get up and throw away his crutches because he was healed. The evident miracle attracted general attention to the small oratory, and in a very short time there were new healings: between 1609 and 1610 there were seven other miracles that confirmed in the faithful the devotion to the 'Madonna of the Hens' in and out of the Agro nocerino-sarnese.

It was then decided the building of a more worthy church to welcome the faithful, and in 1610 Msgr. Lunadoro, bishop of Nocera de' Pagani, tells us that "thanks to the help of the devout people, who give large alms, a much more capable church is begun" to be built in the place where the hens had found the panel. The work had to proceed very quickly considering that Msgr. Stefano de Vicari, in his pastoral visit made in 1615, speaks of a 'newly built church' (Latin: ecclesia noviter erecta).

Due to the deterioration of the original painting, the image was reproduced on canvas and placed in this purpose-built church, namely the Shrine of Our Lady of the Hens.

In August 1786 the diocesan bishop, Msgr. Benedetto dei Monti Sanfelice, published a decree with which the chapter of Saint Peter in the Vatican decided to solemnly crown the 'Madonna delle Galline' in gratitude for the protection of Mary to the population. The coronation ceremony took place in 1787.

== See also ==
- Archconfraternity of Our Lady of the Hens
- Feast of Our Lady of the Hens
- Shrine of Our Lady of the Hens
