= Nikita Kirsanov =

Russian footballer

Personal information
- Full name: Nikita Sergeyevich Kirsanov
- Date of birth: 4 January 1995 (age 31)
- Place of birth: Gukovo, Russia
- Height: 1.74 m (5 ft 9 in)
- Position: Midfielder

Youth career
- –2009: DYuSSh Gukovo
- 2009–2012: FC Khimki

Senior career*
Years	Team	Apps	(Gls)
2013–2014	FC Khimki-M		
2014–2015	FC Torpedo Moscow	0	(0)
2015–2017	FC Khimki	32	(0)
2017–2019	FC Nosta Novotroitsk	48	(10)
2019–2021	FC Veles Moscow	46	(3)
2021–2022	FC Tom Tomsk	32	(6)
2022	FC KAMAZ Naberezhnye Chelny	15	(1)
2023–2024	FC Volga Ulyanovsk	39	(1)
- * Club domestic league appearances and goals as of 8 June 2024

Nikita Sergeyevich Kirsanov (Russian: Никита Сергеевич Кирсанов; born 4 January 1995) is a Russian football player who plays as a midfielder.

== Club career ==
He made his debut in the Russian Professional Football League for FC Khimki on 20 July 2015 in a game against FC Dynamo St. Petersburg.

He made his Russian Football National League debut for Khimki on 16 July 2016 in a game against FC Tambov.
