= Santiago Pallares =

Uruguayan footballer (born 1994)

Personal information
- Full name: Santiago Pallares Palomeque
- Date of birth: 4 April 1994 (age 32)
- Place of birth: Montevideo, Uruguay
- Height: 1.84 m (6 ft 0 in)
- Position: Forward

Team information
- Current team: La Luz
- Number: 13

Senior career*
Years	Team	Apps	(Gls)
2013–2014	Miramar Misiones	16	(0)
2017	Hawkesbury City	24	(22)
2018–2019	Old Christians		
2020	Rampla Juniors	22	(6)
2021	Atlético Grau	20	(14)
2022	UTC	4	(0)
2022–	La Luz	5	(0)

International career
2009	Uruguay U15	3	(1)

Managerial career
- 2017: Hawkesbury City (youth)
- * Club domestic league appearances and goals

Santiago Pallares Palomeque (born 4 April 1994) is an Uruguayan footballer who plays as a forward for La Luz.

== Career statistics ==
=== Club ===
As of 19 July 2019.

Club	Season	League			Cup		Other		Total	
Club	Season	Division	Apps	Goals	Apps	Goals	Apps	Goals	Apps	Goals
Miramar Misiones	2013–14	Uruguayan Primera División	8	0	0	0	0	0	8	0
Miramar Misiones	2014–15	Uruguayan Segunda División	8	0	0	0	0	0	8	0
Total			16	0	0	0	0	0	16	0
Hawkesbury City	2017	NPL NSW 3	24	22	0	0	0	0	24	22
Career total			40	22	0	0	0	0	40	22
