= Gerardo Escobedo =

Mexican footballer (born 1996)

Personal information
- Full name: Gerardo Escobedo Rodríguez
- Date of birth: 19 April 1996 (age 30)
- Place of birth: Chihuahua, Mexico
- Height: 1.83 m (6 ft 0 in)
- Position: Forward

Team information
- Current team: Chihuahua
- Number: 7

Youth career
- 2013–2017: Tigres UANL

Senior career*
| Years | Team | Apps | (Gls) |
| 2017 | Tigres UANL | 0 | (0) |
| 2017 | → Zacatepec (loan) | 10 | (1) |
| 2017–2018 | → Atlético San Luis (loan) | 11 | (1) |
| 2018–2020 | UACH | 53 | (10) |
| 2020 | Sonora | 3 | (0) |
| 2021 | Atlético San Luis | 11 | (2) |
| 2022– | Chihuahua | 0 | (0) |
- * Club domestic league appearances and goals as of March 15, 2021

Gerardo Escobedo Rodríguez (born 10 April 1996) is a Mexican professional footballer who plays as a forward for Chihuahua F.C. He represented Mexico at the 2019 Summer Universiade.
