= Mariana Ramos =

Mexican footballer (born 1998)

Personal information
- Full name: Mariana Ramos Valenzuela
- Date of birth: 10 March 1998 (age 28)
- Place of birth: Cajeme, Sonora, Mexico
- Height: 1.64 m (5 ft 5 in)
- Position: Forward

Senior career*
Years	Team	Apps	(Gls)
2021–2022	Puebla	31	(4)
2022–2025	Necaxa	49	(11)
- * Club domestic league appearances and goals as of 4 June 2023

Mariana Ramos Valenzuela (born 10 March 1998) is a Mexican professional footballer who played as a Forward for Liga MX Femenil side Necaxa.

== Career ==
In 2021, she started her career in Puebla. In 2022, she got transferred to Necaxa.
