= San Mauro la Bruca =

San Mauro La Bruca
- Comune
- Comune di San Mauro La Bruca
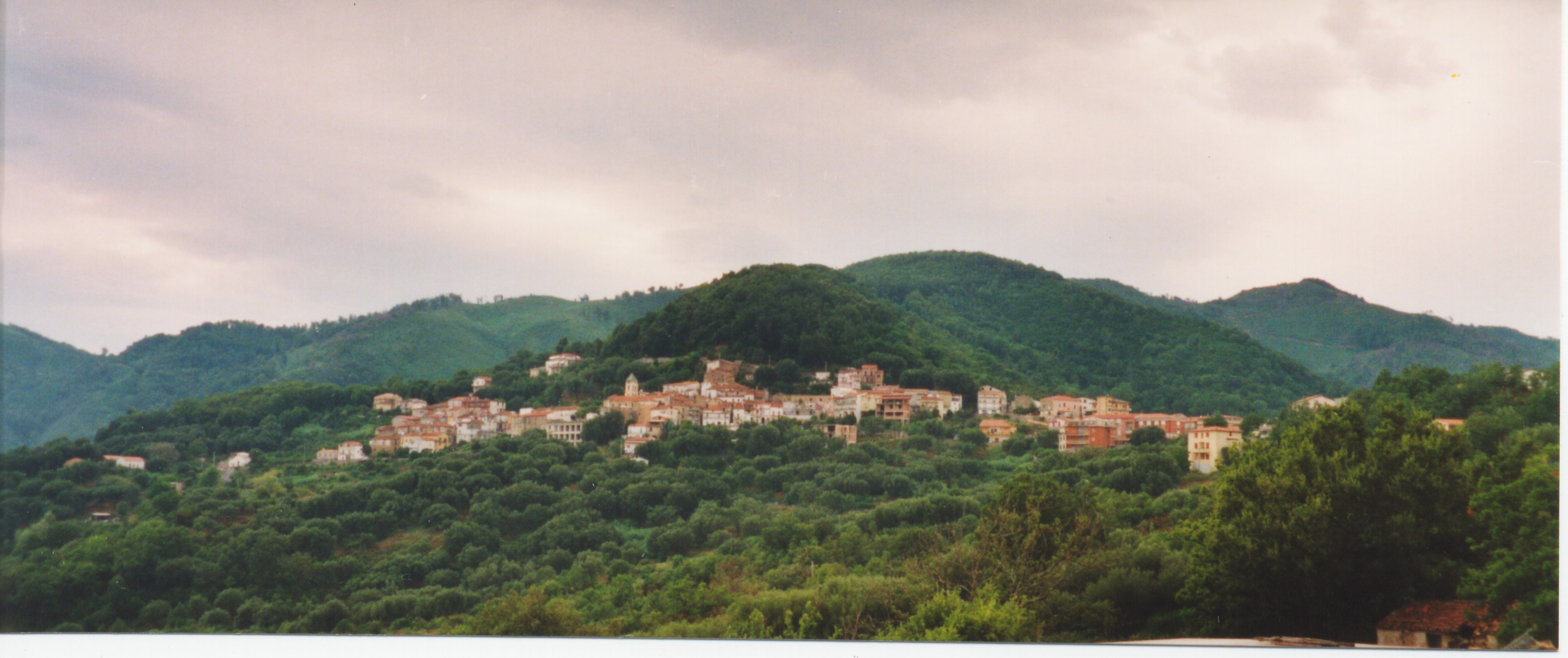

- Coat of arms

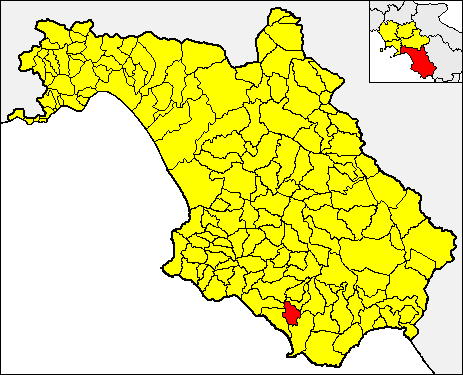
- San Mauro la Bruca within the Province of Salerno

- Location within Italy Location within Campania
- Coordinates: 40°7′N 15°17′E
- Country: Italy
- Region: Campania
- Province: Salerno (SA)
- Frazioni: San Nazario

Government
  - Mayor: Francesco Scarabino

Area
  - Total: 19.05 km^{2} (7.36 sq mi)
- Elevation: 450 m (1,480 ft)

Population (28 February 2015)
  - Total: 606
  - Density: 31.8/km^{2} (82.4/sq mi)
- Demonym: Sammauresi
- Time zone: UTC+1 (CET)
  - Summer (DST): UTC+2 (CEST)
- Postal code: 84070
- Dialing code: 0974
- Patron saint: Sant'Eufemia V. & M. (protector: San Mauro Abate)
- Saint day: 15 January, last Sunday in April, last Sunday in August and 16 September
- Website: Official website

San Mauro la Bruca is a town and comune in the province of Salerno in the Campania region of south-west Italy.

== Eucharistic miracle ==
In the Catholic Church, the town was the site of a Eucharistic miracle that occurred in 1969.

== Twin towns ==
- Grottaferrata, Italy
- Viagrande, Italy

== See also ==
- Cilento
- Province of Salerno
