= Stadio Marcello Torre =

Stadium in Pagani, Campania, Italy

Coordinates: 40°44′24.83″N 14°36′25.47″E

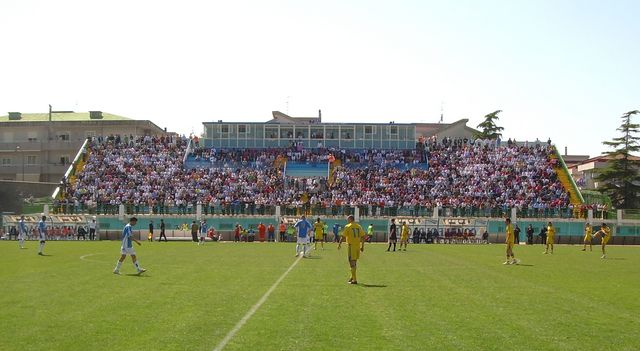
- Interactive map of Stadio Marcello Torre
- Location: Pagani, Italy
- Owner: Municipality of Pagani
- Capacity: 4,292
- Surface: Grass

Construction
- Opened: 1975

Tenant
- Paganese Calcio 1926

Stadio Marcello Torre is a multi-use stadium in Pagani, Italy. It is used mostly for football matches and is the home ground of Paganese Calcio 1926.

The stadium was opened in 1975, and is named for Marcello Torre, a mayor of the city. The stadium has 4,292 seats.
