= Stadio San Francesco d'Assisi =

Football stadium in Nocera Inferiore, Italy

Coordinates: 40°44′50.35″N 14°39′09.29″E

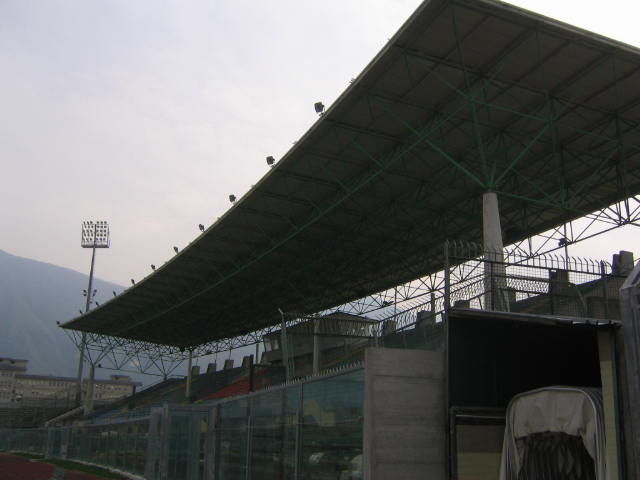
- Interactive map of Stadio San Francesco d'Assisi
- Location: Nocera Inferiore, Italy
- Owner: Municipality of Nocera Inferiore
- Capacity: 7,632
- Surface: Grass; 110m x 60m

Construction
- Groundbreaking: 1970
- Opened: 1973

Tenant
A.S.G. Nocerina	(?–2015?)
A.S.D. Nocerina 1910	(2015?–)

The Stadio San Francesco d'Assisi is a football stadium in Nocera Inferiore, Italy. It is the home of A.S.D. Nocerina 1910 and former home stadium of now defunct A.S.G. Nocerina. The stadium was originally called the "Stadio Comunale" but was renamed in honour to Saint Francis of Assisi because there is a church nearby dedicated to him.

The stadium was built in 1970, and rebuilt and amplified in 1978 on the occasion of the promotion of Nocerina to Serie B.

Renovations on the structure have continued: in the 1986 the grandstand was covered and the tartan track was added. In 2000 the stadium was illuminated. Finally, in 2006 it was re-amplified with the Curva Nord, and the tartan track was once again restructured.

The official record attendance is 15,000 from 1979, at a Serie B match between Nocerina and Genoa.

In the 1992 the Stadio San Francesco hosted the visit of Pope John Paul II.

The stadium is located in the east of the city, in viale San Francesco, not far from the old amphitheatre of Nuceria Alfaterna.

== Gallery ==
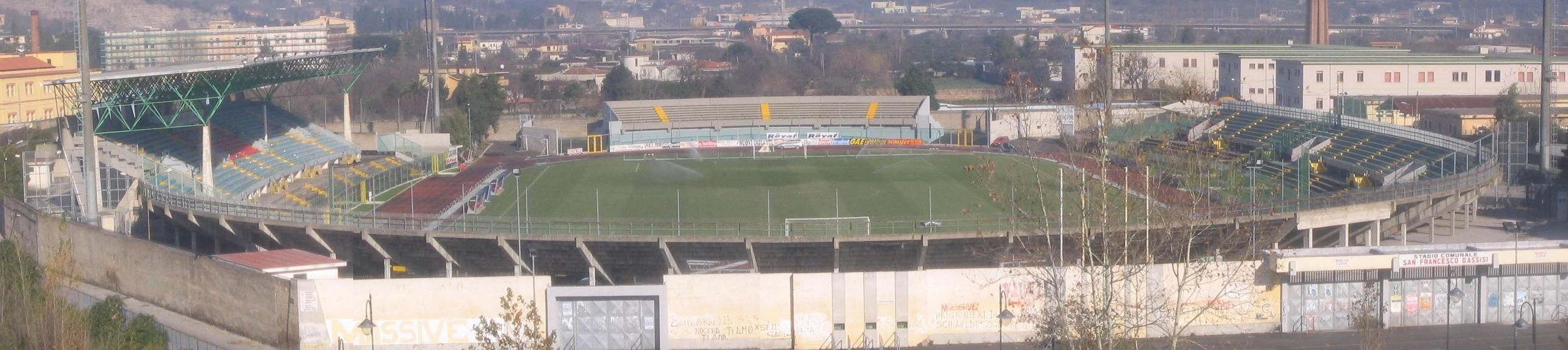
The whole Stadium
