= Stadio Simonetta Lamberti =

Coordinates: 40°42′35″N 14°42′9″E

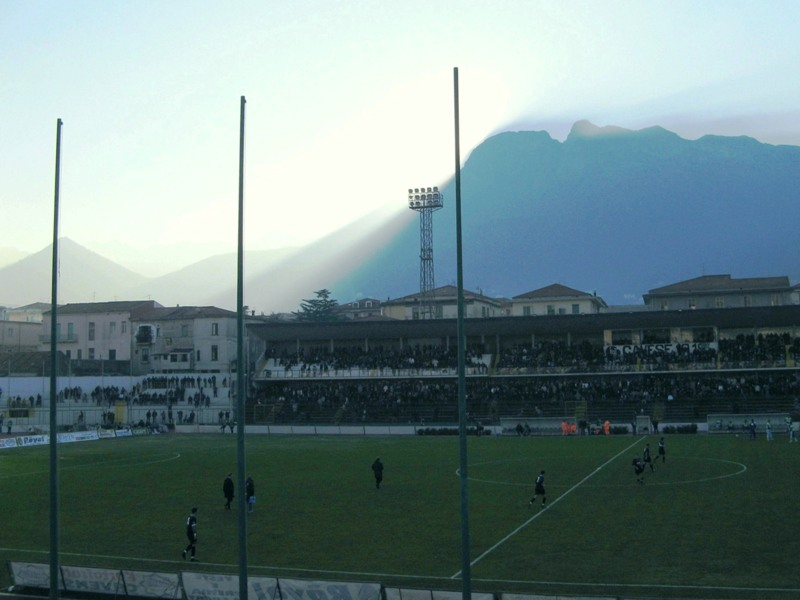
- Interactive map of Stadio Simonetta Lamberti
- Location: Cava de' Tirreni, Italy
- Owner: Municipality of Cava de' Tirreni
- Capacity: 7,000 (5,200 approved)
- Surface: Grass; 110x65m

Construction
- Opened: 1969

Tenant
- Cavese 1919

Stadio Simonetta Lamberti is a multi-purpose stadium in Cava de' Tirreni, Italy. The stadium opened in 1969 and holds 5,200 spectators. The pitch is 110 × 65 metres.

It is currently used, mostly, for football matches and is the home ground of the Cavese 1919.
