= Pagani, Campania =

Pagani ('e) Pavane (Neapolitan)
- Comune
- Comune di Pagani
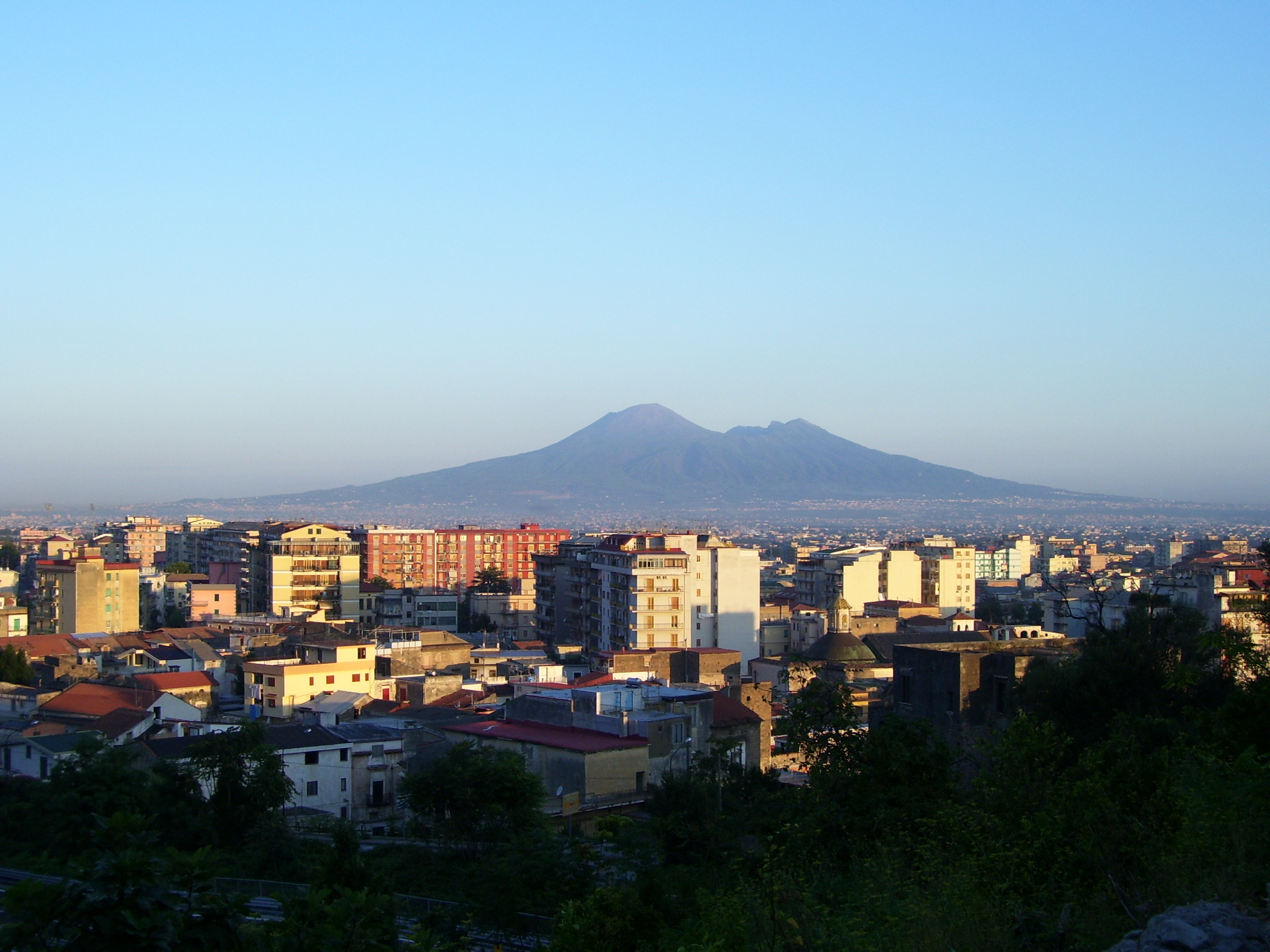
- Panoramic view

- Coat of arms

- Location within Italy Location within Campania
- Coordinates: 40°44′N 14°37′E
- Country: Italy
- Region: Campania
- Province: Salerno (SA)

Government
  - Mayor: Raffaele Maria De Prisco (s. 5.10.2020)

Area
  - Total: 12 km^{2} (4.6 sq mi)
- Elevation: 35 m (115 ft)

Population (2004)
  - Total: 34,775
  - Density: 2,900/km^{2} (7,500/sq mi)
- Demonym: Paganesi
- Time zone: UTC+1 (CET)
  - Summer (DST): UTC+2 (CEST)
- Postal code: 84016
- Dialing code: 081
- Patron saint: St. Alphonse; Our Lady of the Hens
- Saint day: August 1; Second Sunday of Easter
- Website: Official website

Pagani (Italian: [paˈɡaːni]; Neapolitan: ('e) Pavane, [(e) paˈvɑːnə]) is a town and comune (municipality) in Campania, Italy, administratively part of the Province of Salerno, in the region known as the Agro nocerino-sarnese. Pagani has a population of 35,834, as of 2016.

== History ==
In the period before the Roman supremacy in southern Italy, it was included into the territory of Nuceria, the chief town in the Sarnus valley – Herculaneum, Pompeii, Stabiae and Surrentum all being dependent upon it, according to many archaeologists. It maintained its allegiance to Rome till 309 BC when it joined the revolting Samnites. In 308 BC it repulsed a Roman attempt to land at the mouth of the Sarnus, but in 307 BC it was besieged and surrendered. It obtained favourable terms, and remained faithful to Rome even after Cannae.

Hannibal reduced it in 216 BC by starvation, and destroyed the town of Nuceria. The inhabitants returned when peace was restored. Even during the Social War it remained true to Rome. In 73 BC it was plundered by Spartacus.

In the Middle Ages (around the 9th century) a small colony of Saracens was introduced in the town by permission of the Dukes of Naples, but it lasted only a few decades.

The territory was merged back to Nuceria, which took the name of Nuceria Paganorum (Italian: Nocera dei Pagani), inspired by the noble Pagano family living in the castle of Curtis in Plano, in modern-day Pagani.

== Churches and religion ==
Pagani is home to some well-known churches and basilica, including:

- The Shrine of Saint Mary the Crowned of Carmel (Italian: Santuario di Santa Maria Incoronata del Carmine), commonly known as the Shrine of Our Lady of the Hens (Italian: Santuario della Madonna delle Galline). This Marian shrine hosts the annual Feast of Our Lady of the Hens (Italian: Madonna delle Galline). During this week, people dance in the streets to the tammurriata (or tarantella).

== Sports ==
The town is home to the Italian third-division Serie C football club, Paganese Calcio 1926, whose home ground is the 6,000-seat Stadio Marcello Torre.

== See also ==
- Daughters of Charity of the Most Precious Blood
