= 2019–20 US Sassuolo Calcio season =

Sassuolo
2019–20 season
- President: Carlo Rossi
- Manager: Roberto De Zerbi
- Stadium: Mapei Stadium – Città del Tricolore
- Serie A: 8th
- Coppa Italia: Fourth round
- Top goalscorer: League: Francesco Caputo (21); All: Francesco Caputo (21)
Home colours	Away colours	Third colours

The 2019–20 U.S. Sassuolo Calcio season was the club's seventh consecutive season in the top-flight of Italian football. The club competed in Serie A and the Coppa Italia.

Roberto De Zerbi coached the club for the second full season after replacing previous coach Giuseppe Iachini in June 2018.

== Players ==
=== Squad information ===
As of 9 February 2020
Appearances include league matches only

No.	Name	Nat	Position(s)	Date of birth (age)	Signed from	Signed in	Contract ends	Apps.	Goals	Notes
Goalkeepers
47	Andrea Consigli	(Italy)	GK	27 January 1987 (age 39)	(Italy) Atalanta	2014	2022	200	0	3rd captain
56	Gianluca Pegolo	(Italy)	GK	25 March 1981 (age 45)	(Italy) Siena	2013	2020	44	0	
63	Stefano Turati	(Italy)	GK	5 September 2001 (age 24)	(Italy) Youth Sector	2018		2	0	
64	Alessandro Russo	(Italy)	GK	31 March 2001 (age 25)	(Italy) Genoa	2019		0	0	
Defenders
2	Marlon	(Brazil)	CB	7 September 1995 (age 30)	(Spain) Barcelona	2018	2023	32	1	
6	Rogério	(Brazil)	LB	13 January 1998 (age 28)	(Italy) Juventus	2017	2023	50	1	
13	Federico Peluso	(Italy)	LB / CB	20 January 1984 (age 42)	(Italy) Juventus	2014	2021	159	5	
17	Mert Müldür	(Turkey)	RB / CB / LB	3 April 1999 (age 27)	(Austria) Rapid Wien	2019	2024	11	0	
19	Filippo Romagna	(Italy)	CB / DM	26 May 1997 (age 28)	(Italy) Cagliari	2019	2020	16	0	Loan
21	Vlad Chiricheș	(Romania)	CB	14 November 1989 (age 36)	(Italy) Napoli	2019	2020	4	0	Loan
22	Jeremy Toljan	(Germany)	RB / LB / RM	8 August 1994 (age 31)	(Germany) Borussia Dortmund	2019	2020	21	1	Loan
31	Gian Marco Ferrari	(Italy)	CB	15 February 1992 (age 34)	(Italy) Crotone	2016	2023	42	4	
32	Giangiacomo Magnani	(Italy)	CB	4 October 1995 (age 30)	(Italy) Juventus	2018	2023	20	0	
33	Alessandro Tripaldelli	(Italy)	LB / LM	9 February 1999 (age 27)	(Italy) Youth Sector	2018	2022	2	0	
77	Giorgos Kyriakopoulos	(Greece)	LB / CM / LM	5 February 1996 (age 30)	(Greece) Asteras Tripolis	2019	2020	14	0	Loan
96	Leonardo Fontanesi	(Italy)	CB / RB	20 February 1996 (age 30)	(Italy) Youth Sector	2015	2020	3	0	
Midfielders
4	Francesco Magnanelli	(Italy)	DM	12 November 1984 (age 41)	(Italy) Sangiovannese	2005	2019	445	8	Captain
10	Filip Đuričić	(Serbia)	AM	30 January 1992 (age 34)	(Italy) Sampdoria	2018	2022	39	6	
14	Pedro Obiang	(Equatorial Guinea)	CM / DM	27 March 1992 (age 34)	(England) West Ham United	2019		20	1	
23	Hamed Junior Traorè	(Ivory Coast)	CM / RW / AM	16 February 2000 (age 26)	(Italy) Empoli	2019	2021	20	3	Loan
68	Mehdi Bourabia	(Morocco)	CM / AM	7 August 1991 (age 34)	(Turkey) Konyaspor	2018	2022	37	1	
73	Manuel Locatelli	(Italy)	DM / CM	8 January 1998 (age 28)	(Italy) Milan	2018	2023	47	2	
Forwards
7	Jérémie Boga	(Ivory Coast)	LW / AM / SS	3 January 1997 (age 29)	(England) Chelsea	2018	2022	47	10	
9	Francesco Caputo	(Italy)	CF	6 August 1987 (age 38)	(Italy) Empoli	2019	2022	21	11	
11	Grégoire Defrel	(France)	CF / SS / RW	17 June 1991 (age 34)	(Italy) Roma	2019	2020	10	1	Loan
18	Giacomo Raspadori	(Italy)	ST	18 February 2000 (age 26)	(Italy) Youth Sector	2018	2022	5	0	
25	Domenico Berardi	(Italy)	RW / LW / SS	1 August 1994 (age 31)	(Italy) Youth Sector	2012	2022	232	75	Vice-captain
Players transferred during the season
3	Edoardo Goldaniga	(Italy)	CB	2 November 1993 (age 32)	(Italy) Palermo	2017	2022	13	1	
5	Andreaw Gravillon	(Guadeloupe)	CB / RB	8 February 1998 (age 28)	(Italy) Internazionale	2019	2020	0	0	Loan
8	Alfred Duncan	(Ghana)	CM	10 March 1993 (age 33)	(Italy) Sampdoria	2015	2020	119	7	
27	Kevin-Prince Boateng	(Ghana)	AM / CM / SS	6 March 1987 (age 39)	(Germany) Eintracht Frankfurt	2018	2021	13	4	
29	Marcello Trotta	(Italy)	ST	29 September 1992 (age 33)	(Italy) Avellino	2016	2020	8	1	
32	Alessandro Matri	(Italy)	ST	19 August 1984 (age 41)	(Italy) Milan	2016	2019	73	13	
36	Luca Mazzitelli	(Italy)	CM / DM	15 November 1995 (age 30)	(Italy) Roma	2016	2022	38	1	
39	Cristian Dell'Orco	(Italy)	LB	10 February 1994 (age 32)	(Italy) Parma	2015	2020	20	0	
72	Aristidi Kolaj	(Albania)	RW / LW / CF	9 April 1999 (age 27)	(Italy) Youth Sector	2019		0	0	
99	Enrico Brignola	(Italy)	RW / SS	8 July 1999 (age 26)	(Italy) Benevento	2018	2023	7	1	

== Competitions ==
=== Serie A ===
==== League table ====
Pos	Team	Pld	W	D	L	GF	GA	GD	Pts	Qualification or relegation
6	Milan	38	19	9	10	63	46	+17	66	Qualification for the Europa League second qualifying round
7	Napoli	38	18	8	12	61	50	+11	62	Qualification for the Europa League group stage (Note: Napoli qualified for the Europa League group stage by winning the 2019–20 Coppa Italia.)
8	Sassuolo	38	14	9	15	69	63	+6	51	
9	Hellas Verona	38	12	13	13	47	51	−4	49 (Note: Positions determined by head-to-head points: Hellas Verona: 10 pts; Fiorentina: 5 pts; Parma: 1 pt.)	
10	Fiorentina	38	12	13	13	51	48	+3	49	

Source: Serie A, Soccerway
Rules for classification: 1) Points; 2) Head-to-head points; 3) Head-to-head goal difference; 4) Goal difference; 5) Goals scored; 6) Draw. (Note: Head-to-head record is used only after all the matches between the teams in question have been played)

==== Results summary ====
Overall								Home						Away					
Pld	W	D	L	GF	GA	GD	Pts	W	D	L	GF	GA	GD	W	D	L	GF	GA	GD
38	14	9	15	69	63	+6	51	8	3	8	44	33	+11	6	6	7	25	30	−5

Last updated: 2 August 2020.
Source: Competitive matches

==== Results by round ====
Round	1	2	3	4	5	6	7	8	9	10	11	12	13	14	15	16	17	18	19	20	21	22	23	24	25	26	27	28	29	30	31	32	33	34	35	36	37	38
Ground	A	H	A	H	A	H	A	H	A	H	A	H	H	A	H	A	H	A	A	H	A	H	A	H	A	H	A	H	A	H	A	A	H	A	H	A	H	H
Result	L	W	L	W	L	L	W	L	W	L	D	W	L	D	D	D	L	L	L	W	D	W	W	L	L	W	D	D	W	W	W	W	D	D	L	L	W	L
Position	15	8	14	8	10	13	16	17	15	15	15	13	14	14	14	14	12	14	16	15	15	13	12	12	12	11	12	12	12	10	8	8	8	8	8	8	8	8

Updated to match(es) played on 2 August 2020. Source: Competitive matches
A = Away; H = Home; W = Win; D = Draw; L = Loss

==== Matches ====
25 August 2019 1	Torino	2–1	Sassuolo	Turin
20:45 CEST (UTC+02:00)	Zaza 14', (yellow card) 90+2'; Ansaldi (yellow card) 24'; Bremer (yellow card) 35'; Belotti 55'; Sirigu (yellow card) 77'	Report	Marlon (yellow card) 11'; Bourabia (yellow card) 45+3'; Caputo 69'; Obiang (yellow card) 78'	Stadium: Stadio Olimpico Grande Torino; Attendance: 16,536; Referee: Maurizio Mariani

1 September 2019 2	Sassuolo	4–1	Sampdoria	Reggio Emilia
20:45 CEST (UTC+02:00)	Duncan (yellow card) 16'; Berardi 29', 36', 43'; Traorè 47'	Report	Colley (yellow card) 11'; Vieira (red card) 45+1'; Quagliarella (yellow card) 64', (goal) 67' (pen.); Caprari (yellow card) 87'	Stadium: Mapei Stadium – Città del Tricolore; Attendance: 9,608; Referee: Luca Pairetto

15 September 2019 3	Roma	4–2	Sassuolo	Rome
18:00 CEST (UTC+02:00)	Cristante 12'; Džeko 19'; Mkhitaryan 22'; Pellegrini (yellow card) 28'; Kluivert 33'	Report	Obiang (yellow card) 33'; Berardi 53', 72'; Toljan (yellow card) 82'	Stadium: Stadio Olimpico; Attendance: 34,407; Referee: Daniele Chiffi

22 September 2019 4	Sassuolo	3–0	SPAL	Reggio Emilia
12:30 CEST (UTC+02:00)	Traorè (yellow card) 5'; Ferrari (yellow card) 16'; Caputo 26', 45+2'; Duncan 47'; Peluso (yellow card) 53'	Report	Tomović (yellow card) 37'; Kurtić (yellow card) 69'	Stadium: Mapei Stadium – Città del Tricolore; Attendance: 10,937; Referee: Maurizio Mariani

25 September 2019 5	Parma	1–0	Sassuolo	Parma
21:00 CEST (UTC+02:00)	Gervinho (yellow card) 20'; Gagliolo (yellow card) 89'; Iacoponi (yellow card) 90+3'; Bourabia 90+5' (o.g.)	Report	Obiang (yellow card) 73'	Stadium: Stadio Ennio Tardini; Attendance: 14,569; Referee: Livio Marinelli

28 September 2019 6	Sassuolo	1–4	Atalanta	Reggio Emilia
20:45 CEST (UTC+02:00)	Berardi (yellow card) 33'; Ferrari (yellow card) 44'; Defrel 62'	Report	Gómez 6', 29'; Gosens 13'; Zapata 35'; Toloi (yellow card) 70'; Malinovskyi (yellow card) 87'	Stadium: Mapei Stadium – Città del Tricolore; Attendance: 12,500; Referee: Paolo Valeri

20 October 2019 8	Sassuolo	3–4	Internazionale	Reggio Emilia
12:30 CEST (UTC+02:00)	Berardi 16'; Obiang (yellow card) 24'; Duncan (yellow card) 34'; Magnanelli (yellow card) 40'; Đuričić 74'; Müldür (yellow card) 75'; Boga 82'	Report	Martínez 2', 71' (pen.); Lukaku 38', 45' (pen.); De Vrij (yellow card) 42'; Lazaro (yellow card) 76'; Bastoni (yellow card) 90+2'	Stadium: Mapei Stadium; Attendance: 17,935; Referee: Piero Giacomelli

25 October 2019 9	Hellas Verona	0–1	Sassuolo	Verona
20:45 CEST (UTC+02:00)	Kumbulla (yellow card) 6'; Günter (yellow card) 10'; Verre (yellow card) 20'; Pessina (yellow card) 36'; Amrabat (yellow card) 40'	Report	Romagna (yellow card) 15'; Defrel (yellow card) 21'; Đuričić 50', (yellow card) 59'; Peluso (yellow card) 60'; Magnanelli (yellow card) 68'	Stadium: Stadio Marc'Antonio Bentegodi; Attendance: 11,453; Referee: Luca Pairetto

30 October 2019 10	Sassuolo	1–2	Fiorentina	Reggio Emilia
21:00 CET (UTC+01:00)	Boga 24'; Caputo (yellow card) 30'; Đuričić (yellow card) 51'; Berardi (yellow card) 68'	Report	Venuti (yellow card) 13'; Pezzella (yellow card) 42'; Castrovilli 63', (yellow card) 89'; Dalbert (yellow card) 71'; Milenković 81'	Stadium: Mapei Stadium – Città del Tricolore; Attendance: 11,863; Referee: Maurizio Mariani

3 November 2019 11	Lecce	2–2	Sassuolo	Lecce
15:00 CET (UTC+01:00)	Lapadula 18'; Falco 42'; Calderoni (yellow card) 60'; Shakhov (yellow card) 74'	Report	Toljan 35', (yellow card) 45+1'; Locatelli (yellow card) 37'; Obiang (yellow card) 82'; Berardi 85'	Stadium: Stadio Via del Mare; Attendance: 22,087; Referee: Riccardo Ros

8 November 2019 12	Sassuolo	3–1	Bologna	Reggio Emilia
20:45 CET (UTC+01:00)	Caputo 34', 75'; Marlon (yellow card) 58'; Boga 68'; Magnanelli (yellow card) 87'	Report	Medel (yellow card) 50'; Danilo (yellow card) 53'; Bani (yellow card) 57'; Džemaili (yellow card) 65'; Orsolini 70'; Svanberg (yellow card) 88'; Mbaye (yellow card) 90'	Stadium: Mapei Stadium – Città del Tricolore; Attendance: 13,184; Referee: Marco Piccinini

24 November 2019 13	Sassuolo	1–2	Lazio	Reggio Emilia
15:00 CET (UTC+01:00)	Peluso (yellow card) 16'; Caputo 45'	Report	Lulić (yellow card) 24'; Immobile 34'; Luiz Felipe (yellow card) 44'; Bastos (yellow card) 79'; Caicedo 90+1'	Stadium: Mapei Stadium – Città del Tricolore; Attendance: 10,000; Referee: Daniele Chiffi

1 December 2019 14	Juventus	2–2	Sassuolo	Turin
12:30 CET (UTC+01:00)	Bonucci 20'; Ronaldo 68' (pen.); Pjanić (yellow card) 88'	Report	Boga 23'; Đuričić (yellow card) 40'; Caputo 47'; Locatelli (yellow card) 65'; Toljan (yellow card) 78'; Kyriakopoulos (yellow card) 81'; Müldür (yellow card) 87'	Stadium: Allianz Stadium; Attendance: 40,597; Referee: Federico La Penna

8 December 2019 15	Sassuolo	2–2	Cagliari	Reggio Emilia
15:00 CET (UTC+01:00)	Berardi 7', (yellow card) 38'; Đuričić 36', (yellow card) 45'; Magnanelli (yellow card) 39'	Report	Klavan (yellow card) 33'; Pellegrini (yellow card) 36'; Rog (yellow card) 45+1'; Pisacane (yellow card) 47'; João Pedro 51'; Ragatzu 90'	Stadium: Mapei Stadium – Città del Tricolore; Attendance: 12,666; Referee: Luca Pairetto

15 December 2019 16	Milan	0–0	Sassuolo	Milan
15:00 CET (UTC+01:00)	Hernandez (yellow card) 29'; Musacchio (yellow card) 40'; Kessié (yellow card) 43'; Bonaventura (yellow card) 72'; Paquetá (yellow card) 90+3'	Report	Toljan (yellow card) 10'; Caputo (yellow card) 39'; Locatelli (yellow card) 73'; Marlon (yellow card) 80'	Stadium: San Siro; Attendance: 58,005; Referee: Gianluca Manganiello

18 December 2019 7	Brescia	0–2	Sassuolo	Brescia
20:45 CET (UTC+01:00)	Špalek (yellow card) 45+2'; Torregrossa (yellow card) 54'	Report	Traorè 25'; Toljan (yellow card) 27'; Rogério (yellow card) 30'; Obiang (yellow card) 34'; Caputo 71'	Stadium: Stadio Mario Rigamonti; Attendance: 14,574; Referee: Marco Di Bello
Note: Match was originally scheduled for 4 October, but was postponed to 18 December due to the death of Sassuolo owner Giorgio Squinzi.

22 December 2019 17	Sassuolo	1–2	Napoli	Reggio Emilia
20:45 CET (UTC+01:00)	Traorè 29', (yellow card) 37'; Locatelli (yellow card) 66'	Report	Mário Rui (yellow card) 33'; Allan 57'; Elmas (yellow card) 72'; Obiang 90+4' (o.g.)	Stadium: Mapei Stadium – Città del Tricolore; Attendance: 12,570; Referee: Daniele Chiffi

5 January 2020 18	Genoa	2–1	Sassuolo	Genoa
18:00 CET (UTC+01:00)	Criscito (yellow card) 20', (goal) 29' (pen.); Sturaro (yellow card) 37'; Sanabria (yellow card) 51'; Pandev 86'; Biraschi (yellow card) 90+6'	Report	Duncan (yellow card) 19'; Locatelli (yellow card) 24'; Obiang 33', (yellow card) 90+1'; Romagna (yellow card) 77'; Toljan (yellow card) 85'; Berardi (red card) 90+7'	Stadium: Stadio Luigi Ferraris; Attendance: 21,033; Referee: Massimiliano Irrati

12 January 2020 19	Udinese	3–0	Sassuolo	Udine
12:30 CET (UTC+01:00)	Okaka 14'; Sema 68'; De Paul 90+1'	Report		Stadium: Dacia Arena; Attendance: 21,731; Referee: Manuel Volpi

18 January 2020 20	Sassuolo	2–1	Torino	Reggio Emilia
18:00 CET (UTC+01:00)	Kyriakopoulos (yellow card) 38'; Toljan (yellow card) 54'; Boga 61'; Berardi 73'	Report	Locatelli 20' (o.g.); Djidji (yellow card) 37'; Verdi (yellow card) 39'; Rincón (yellow card) 42'; Aina (yellow card) 60'	Stadium: Mapei Stadium – Città del Tricolore; Attendance: 10,765; Referee: Davide Massa

26 January 2020 21	Sampdoria	0–0	Sassuolo	Genoa
15:00 CET (UTC+01:00)	Ekdal (yellow card) 28'; Colley (yellow card) 49'; Bereszyński (yellow card) 69'; Gabbiadini (yellow card) 79'	Report	Peluso (red card) 25'; Rogério (yellow card) 90'	Stadium: Stadio Luigi Ferraris; Attendance: 19,260; Referee: Marco Piccinini

1 February 2020 22	Sassuolo	4–2	Roma	Reggio Emilia
20:45 CET (UTC+01:00)	Caputo 7', 16'; Đuričić 26'; Obiang (yellow card) 34'; Boga 74'	Report	Cristante (yellow card) 24'; Santon (yellow card) 29'; Pellegrini (yellow card) 44' (yellow-red card) 69'; Džeko 55'; Kluivert (yellow card) 62'; Spinazzola (yellow card) 65'; Veretout 73' (pen.); Mancini (yellow card) 84'	Stadium: Mapei Stadium – Città del Tricolore; Attendance: 13,411; Referee: Luca Pairetto

9 February 2020 23	SPAL	1–2	Sassuolo	Ferrara
12:30 CET (UTC+01:00)	Bonifazi 23'; Dabo (yellow card) 38'; Espeto (yellow card) 89'	Report	Obiang (yellow card) 47'; Locatelli (yellow card) 56'; Caputo 65' (pen.); Kyriakopoulos (yellow card) 86'; Boga 90'; Consigli (yellow card) 90+2'	Stadium: Stadio Paolo Mazza; Attendance: 12,988; Referee: Piero Giacomelli

16 February 2020 24	Sassuolo	0–1	Parma	Reggio Emilia
15:00 CET (UTC+01:00)	Marlon (yellow card) 26'; Berardi (yellow card) 58'; Locatelli (yellow card) 77'; Bourabia (yellow card) 81'; Ferrari (yellow card) 90+4'	Report	Gervinho 25'; Laurini (yellow card) 72'; Grassi (yellow card) 87'; Brugman (yellow card) 90'	Stadium: Mapei Stadium – Città del Tricolore; Attendance: 10,000; Referee: Maurizio Mariani

9 March 2020 26	Sassuolo	3–0	Brescia	Reggio Emilia
18:30 CET (UTC+01:00)	Romagna (yellow card) 31'; Rogério (yellow card) 37'; Caputo 45', 61'; Locatelli (yellow card) 56'; Boga 75'	Report	Bisoli (yellow card) 29'; Balotelli (yellow card) 60'; Sabelli (yellow card) 83'	Stadium: Mapei Stadium – Città del Tricolore; Attendance: 0 Referee: Gianluca Manganiello
Note: Match was initially postponed to 13 May from its original date of 1 March due to concerns over the COVID-19 pandemic, but was later moved to 9 March to be played behind closed doors.

21 June 2020 25	Atalanta	4–1	Sassuolo	Bergamo
19:30 CEST (UTC+02:00)	Djimsiti 16', (yellow card) 75'; Zapata 31', 66'; Bourabia 37' (o.g.); Pašalić (yellow card) 40'; Muriel (yellow card) 82'; Toloi (yellow card) 90+1'	Report	Toljan (yellow card) 9'; Peluso (yellow card) 45+2'; Marlon (yellow card) 65'; Bourabia 90+2'	Stadium: Gewiss Stadium; Attendance: 0 Referee: Daniele Chiffi
Note: Match was initially postponed to 11 March from its original date of 23 February due to concerns over the COVID-19 pandemic, after it was moved to 18 March, then to 21 June, to be played behind closed doors. All subsequent matches were also shuffled to allow for this accommodation. On 9 March all sports events in Italy were suspended until 3 April. This was the first match played since the COVID-19 pandemic lockdown in Italy.

24 June 2020 27	Internazionale	3–3	Sassuolo	Milan
19:30 CEST (UTC+02:00)	Škriniar (yellow card) 25' (yellow-red card) 90+3'; Lukaku 41' (pen.); Bastoni (yellow card) 44'; Biraghi 45+1'; Valero 86'	Report	Caputo 4'; Rogério (yellow card) 23'; Berardi 81' (pen.); Magnani 89'	Stadium: San Siro; Attendance: 0 Referee: Davide Massa
Note: Match was postponed to 15 March, then to 24 June, from its original date of 8 March due to schedule shuffling to allow for Sassuolo vs Brescia to be played following its previous postponement due to concerns over the COVID-19 pandemic.

28 June 2020 28	Sassuolo	3–3	Hellas Verona	Reggio Emilia
19:30 CEST (UTC+02:00)	Magnani (yellow card) 25'; Boga 53', 77'; Bourabia (yellow card) 70'; Rogério 90+7'	Report	Kumbulla (yellow card) 15'; Lazović 51'; Stępiński (yellow card) 55', (goal) 57'; Pessina 68'	Stadium: Mapei Stadium – Città del Tricolore; Attendance: 0 Referee: Antonio Giua

1 July 2020 29	Fiorentina	1–3	Sassuolo	Florence
21:45 CEST (UTC+02:00)	Pulgar (yellow card) 44'; Ceccherini (yellow card) 51'; Castrovilli (yellow card) 63'; Ghezzal (yellow card) 73'; Cutrone 90'	Report	Rogério (yellow card) 4'; Defrel 24' (pen.), 35'; Traorè (yellow card) 43'; Müldür 61'	Stadium: Stadio Artemio Franchi; Attendance: 0 Referee: Daniele Chiffi

4 July 2020 30	Sassuolo	4–2	Lecce	Reggio Emilia
19:30 CEST (UTC+02:00)	Caputo 5', (yellow card) 32'; Đuričić (yellow card) 49'; Marlon (yellow card) 54'; Berardi 63' (pen.); Boga 78'; Müldür 83'	Report	Babacar (yellow card) 22'; Lucioni 27'; Petriccione (yellow card) 34'; Paz (yellow card) 62'; Mancosu 67' (pen.); Tachtsidis (yellow card) 90'	Stadium: Mapei Stadium – Città del Tricolore; Attendance: 0 Referee: Davide Massa

8 July 2020 31	Bologna	1–2	Sassuolo	Bologna
21:45 CEST (UTC+02:00)	Medel (yellow card) 26'; Denswil (yellow card) 60'; Dijks (yellow card) 82'; Barrow 90+1'	Report	Haraslín (yellow card) 34', (goal) 57'; Berardi 41'; Bourabia (yellow card) 87'; Müldür (yellow card) 90+1'; Rogério (yellow card) 90+4'	Stadium: Stadio Renato Dall'Ara; Attendance: 0 Referee: Francesco Fourneau

11 July 2020 32	Lazio	1–2	Sassuolo	Rome
17:15 CEST (UTC+02:00)	Parolo (yellow card) 23'; Luis Alberto 33'; Immobile (yellow card) 42'; Bastos (yellow card) 75'; Lucas (yellow card) 85'	Report	Müldür (yellow card) 51'; Raspadori 52'; Ferrari (yellow card) 83'; Caputo 90+1'	Stadium: Stadio Olimpico; Attendance: 0 Referee: Marco Di Bello

15 July 2020 33	Sassuolo	3–3	Juventus	Reggio Emilia
21:45 CEST (UTC+02:00)	Đuričić 29'; Magnanelli (yellow card) 42'; Berardi 51', (yellow card) 58'; Kyriakopoulos (yellow card) 53'; Caputo 54'; Bourabia (yellow card) 90'	Report	Danilo 5'; Higuaín 12'; Bernardeschi (yellow card) 45+1'; Ronaldo (yellow card) 62'; Alex Sandro 64'; Bonucci (yellow card) 81'; Ramsey (yellow card) 90+4'	Stadium: Mapei Stadium – Città del Tricolore; Attendance: 0 Referee: Paolo Valeri

18 July 2020 34	Cagliari	1–1	Sassuolo	Cagliari
19:30 CEST (UTC+02:00)	Carboni (yellow card) 22' (yellow-red card) 48'; Faragò (yellow card) 30'; João Pedro 63'; Rog (yellow card) 83'	Report	Caputo 12'; Marlon (yellow card) 72'; Ferrari (yellow card) 86'	Stadium: Sardegna Arena; Attendance: 0 Referee: Giovanni Ayroldi

21 July 2020 35	Sassuolo	1–2	Milan	Reggio Emilia
21:45 CEST (UTC+02:00)	Bourabia (yellow card) 22' (yellow-red card) 45+7'; Locatelli (yellow card) 34'; Caputo 42' (pen.)	Report	Ibrahimović 19', 45+2'; Hernandez (yellow card) 37'; Bennacer (yellow card) 61'; Laxalt (yellow card) 76'; Bonaventura (yellow card) 85'	Stadium: Mapei Stadium – Città del Tricolore; Attendance: 0 Referee: Luca Pairetto

25 July 2020 36	Napoli	2–0	Sassuolo	Naples
21:45 CEST (UTC+02:00)	Hysaj 8'; Mertens (yellow card) 69'; Allan 90+3'	Report	Berardi (yellow card) 40'; Đuričić (yellow card) 68'; Marlon (yellow card) 74'	Stadium: Stadio San Paolo; Attendance: 0 Referee: Gianluca Aureliano

29 July 2020 37	Sassuolo	5–0	Genoa	Reggio Emilia
19:30 CEST (UTC+02:00)	Traorè 26'; Berardi 40'; Caputo 66', 77'; Raspadori 74'; Obiang (yellow card) 85'	Report	Romero (yellow card) 15'	Stadium: Mapei Stadium – Città del Tricolore; Attendance: 0 Referee: Fabio Maresca

2 August 2020 38	Sassuolo	0–1	Udinese	Reggio Emilia
20:45 CEST (UTC+02:00)	Peluso (yellow card) 11'	Report	Okaka 53'; Musso (yellow card) 90+6'	Stadium: Mapei Stadium – Città del Tricolore; Attendance: 0 Referee: Daniel Amabile

=== Coppa Italia ===
18 August 2019 Third round	Sassuolo	1–0	Spezia	Reggio Emilia
20:45 CEST (UTC+02:00)	Traorè 9'; Gravillon (yellow card) 49'; Obiang (yellow card) 79'	Report	Ricci (yellow card) 46'	Stadium: Mapei Stadium – Città del Tricolore; Attendance: 2,930; Referee: Rosario Abisso

4 December 2019 Fourth round	Sassuolo	1–2	Perugia	Reggio Emilia
15:00 CET (UTC+01:00)	Bourabia (yellow card) 73', (goal) 82'; Rogério (yellow card) 88'; Pellegrini (yellow card) 90+3'	Report	Mazzocchi 10'; Nicolussi 17'; Balić (yellow card) 79'; Falasco (yellow card) 81'; Sgarbi (yellow card) 87'; Di Chiara (yellow card) 90+3'	Stadium: Mapei Stadium – Città del Tricolore; Attendance: 1,215; Referee: Simone Sozza

== Statistics ==
=== Appearances and goals ===
No.	Pos	Nat	Player	Total		Serie A		Coppa Italia	
No.	Pos	Nat	Player	Apps	Goals	Apps	Goals	Apps	Goals
Goalkeepers
47	GK	(Italy) ITA	Andrea Consigli	32	0	31	0	1	0
56	GK	(Italy) ITA	Gianluca Pegolo	5	0	5	0	0	0
63	GK	(Italy) ITA	Stefano Turati	2	0	2	0	0	0
64	GK	(Italy) ITA	Alessandro Russo	1	0	0	0	1	0
Defenders
2	DF	(Brazil) BRA	Marlon	23	0	21+2	0	0	0
6	DF	(Brazil) BRA	Rogério	17	1	12+3	1	1+1	0
13	DF	(Italy) ITA	Federico Peluso	24	0	17+6	0	1	0
17	DF	(Turkey) TUR	Mert Müldür	25	2	13+11	2	1	0
19	DF	(Italy) ITA	Filippo Romagna	18	0	16+2	0	0	0
21	DF	(Romania) ROU	Vlad Chiricheș	9	0	8+1	0	0	0
22	DF	(Germany) GER	Jeremy Toljan	30	1	25+4	1	1	0
31	DF	(Italy) ITA	Gian Marco Ferrari	24	0	21+2	0	1	0
32	DF	(Italy) ITA	Giangiacomo Magnani	8	1	1+7	1	0	0
33	DF	(Italy) ITA	Alessandro Tripaldelli	3	0	1+1	0	1	0
35	DF	(Italy) ITA	Stefano Piccinini	2	0	0+1	0	1	0
77	DF	(Greece) GRE	Giorgos Kyriakopoulos	26	0	17+9	0	0	0
96	DF	(Italy) ITA	Leonardo Fontanesi	0	0	0	0	0	0
Midfielders
4	MF	(Italy) ITA	Francesco Magnanelli	22	0	15+7	0	0	0
10	MF	(Serbia) SRB	Filip Đuričić	30	5	19+10	5	0+1	0
14	MF	(Equatorial Guinea) EQG	Pedro Obiang	27	1	18+7	1	2	0
23	MF	(Ivory Coast) CIV	Hamed Junior Traorè	33	5	20+11	4	2	1
27	MF	(Slovakia) SVK	Lukáš Haraslín	11	1	4+7	1	0	0
44	MF	(Italy) ITA	Andrea Ghion	3	0	0+3	0	0	0
68	MF	(France) FRA	Mehdi Bourabia	19	2	10+7	1	1+1	1
73	MF	(Italy) ITA	Manuel Locatelli	34	0	31+2	0	1	0
Forwards
7	FW	(Ivory Coast) CIV	Jérémie Boga	35	11	28+6	11	1	0
9	FW	(Italy) ITA	Francesco Caputo	37	21	33+3	21	1	0
11	FW	(France) FRA	Grégoire Defrel	17	3	9+8	3	0	0
18	FW	(Italy) ITA	Giacomo Raspadori	13	2	2+9	2	1+1	0
25	FW	(Italy) ITA	Domenico Berardi	32	14	29+2	14	1	0
51	FW	(Italy) ITA	Jacopo Pellegrini	1	0	0	0	0+1	0
53	FW	(Italy) ITA	Giacomo Manzari	3	0	0+3	0	0	0
Players transferred out during the season
5	DF	(Guadeloupe) GLP	Andreaw Gravillon	1	0	0	0	1	0
8	MF	(Ghana) GHA	Alfred Duncan	13	1	10+3	1	0	0
36	MF	(Italy) ITA	Luca Mazzitelli	2	0	0+1	0	1	0
99	FW	(Italy) ITA	Enrico Brignola	1	0	0	0	0+1	0

Last updated: 2 August 2020
Source: Competitions

=== Goalscorers ===
Rank	No.	Pos	Nat	Name	Serie A	Coppa Italia	Total
1	9	FW	(Italy)	Francesco Caputo	19	0	19
2	25	FW	(Italy)	Domenico Berardi	13	0	13
3	7	FW	(Ivory Coast)	Jérémie Boga	11	0	11
4	10	MF	(Serbia)	Filip Đuričić	5	0	5
5	23	MF	(Ivory Coast)	Hamed Junior Traorè	3	1	4
6	11	FW	(France)	Grégoire Defrel	3	0	3
7	17	DF	(Turkey)	Mert Müldür	2	0	2
7	68	MF	(Morocco)	Mehdi Bourabia	1	1	1
9	6	DF	(Brazil)	Rogério	1	0	1
9	8	MF	(Ghana)	Alfred Duncan	1	0	1
9	14	MF	(Equatorial Guinea)	Pedro Obiang	1	0	1
9	18	FW	(Italy)	Giacomo Raspadori	1	0	1
9	22	DF	(Germany)	Jeremy Toljan	1	0	1
9	27	MF	(Slovakia)	Lukáš Haraslín	1	0	1
9	32	DF	(Italy)	Giangiacomo Magnani	1	0	1
Own goal					0	0	0
Totals					64	2	66

Last updated: 21 July 2020

=== Clean sheets ===
Rank	No.	Pos	Nat	Name	Serie A	Coppa Italia	Total
1	47	GK	(Italy)	Andrea Consigli	3	1	4
2	56	GK	(Italy)	Gianluca Pegolo	2	0	2
Totals					5	1	6

Last updated: 9 February 2020

=== Disciplinary record ===
No.	Pos	Nat	Name	Serie A			Coppa Italia			Total		
No.	Pos	Nat	Name	Booked	(yellow card) (yellow-red card)	Sent off (straight red)	Booked	(yellow card) (yellow-red card)	Sent off (straight red)	Booked	(yellow card) (yellow-red card)	Sent off (straight red)
47	GK	(Italy)	Andrea Consigli	1	0	0	0	0	0	1	0	0
2	DF	(Brazil)	Marlon	3	0	0	0	0	0	3	0	0
5	DF	(Guadeloupe)	Andreaw Gravillon	0	0	0	1	0	0	1	0	0
6	DF	(Brazil)	Rogério	2	0	0	1	0	0	3	0	0
13	DF	(Italy)	Federico Peluso	3	0	1	0	0	0	3	0	1
17	DF	(Turkey)	Mert Müldür	2	0	0	0	0	0	2	0	0
19	DF	(Italy)	Filippo Romagna	2	0	0	0	0	0	2	0	0
22	DF	(Germany)	Jeremy Toljan	7	0	0	0	0	0	7	0	0
31	DF	(Italy)	Gian Marco Ferrari	2	0	0	0	0	0	2	0	0
77	DF	(Greece)	Giorgos Kyriakopoulos	3	0	0	0	0	0	3	0	0
4	MF	(Italy)	Francesco Magnanelli	4	0	0	0	0	0	4	0	0
8	MF	(Ghana)	Alfred Duncan	3	0	0	0	0	0	3	0	0
10	MF	(Serbia)	Filip Đuričić	4	0	0	0	0	0	4	0	0
14	MF	(Equatorial Guinea)	Pedro Obiang	9	0	0	1	0	0	10	0	0
23	MF	(Ivory Coast)	Hamed Junior Traorè	2	0	0	0	0	0	2	0	0
68	MF	(France)	Mehdi Bourabia	1	0	0	1	0	0	2	0	0
73	MF	(Italy)	Manuel Locatelli	6	0	0	0	0	0	6	0	0
9	FW	(Italy)	Francesco Caputo	2	0	0	0	0	0	2	0	0
11	FW	(France)	Grégoire Defrel	1	0	0	0	0	0	1	0	0
25	FW	(Italy)	Domenico Berardi	3	0	1	0	0	0	3	0	1
51	FW	(Italy)	Jacopo Pellegrini	0	0	0	1	0	0	1	0	0
Totals				60	0	2	5	0	0	65	0	2

Last updated: 9 February 2020
