= 2016–17 US Sassuolo Calcio season =

Sassuolo
2016–17 season
- President: Carlo Rossi
- Manager: Eusebio Di Francesco
- Stadium: Mapei Stadium – Città del Tricolore
- Serie A: 12th
- Coppa Italia: Round of 16
- UEFA Europa League: Group stage
- Top goalscorer: League: Grégoire Defrel (12); All: Grégoire Defrel (16)
- Highest home attendance: 21,584 vs Juventus (29 January 2017, Serie A)
- Lowest home attendance: 1,154 vs Genk (9 December 2016, Europa League)
- Average home league attendance: 12,362
Home colours	Away colours	Third colours

The 2016–17 season was Unione Sportiva Sassuolo Calcio's fourth consecutive season in the top-flight of Italian football. Sassuolo is competed in Serie A, finishing 12th, in the Coppa Italia, being eliminated in the round of 16, and in the UEFA Europa League, where they were eliminated in the group stage. Sassuolo had achieved their first ever Europa League qualification after finishing 6th at the end of the 2015–16 season.

== Players ==
=== Squad information ===
As of 31 August 2016

Note: Flags indicate national team as defined under FIFA eligibility rules; some limited exceptions apply. Players may hold more than one non-FIFA nationality.

No.	Pos.	Nation	Player
1	GK	ITA	Alberto Pomini ^{EL}
4	MF	ITA	Francesco Magnanelli ^{EL} (captain)
5	DF	ITA	Luca Antei ^{EL}
6	MF	ITA	Lorenzo Pellegrini ^{EL}
7	MF	ITA	Simone Missiroli ^{EL}
8	MF	ITA	Davide Biondini ^{EL}
9	FW	ITA	Pietro Iemmello
10	FW	ITA	Alessandro Matri ^{EL}
11	FW	FRA	Grégoire Defrel ^{EL}
12	MF	ITA	Stefano Sensi
13	DF	ITA	Federico Peluso ^{EL}
15	DF	ITA	Francesco Acerbi ^{EL}
16	FW	ITA	Matteo Politano ^{EL}
20	DF	ESP	Pol Lirola ^{EL} (on loan from Juventus)
22	MF	ITA	Luca Mazzitelli ^{EL}

No.	Pos.	Nation	Player
23	DF	ITA	Marcello Gazzola ^{EL}
25	FW	ITA	Domenico Berardi ^{EL}
26	DF	ITA	Emanuele Terranova
27	FW	ITA	Federico Ricci ^{EL} (on loan from Roma)
28	DF	ITA	Paolo Cannavaro ^{EL}
31	MF	ITA	Simone Caputo ^{EL B}
32	MF	GHA	Alfred Duncan ^{EL}
39	DF	ITA	Cristian Dell'Orco
47	GK	ITA	Andrea Consigli ^{EL}
55	DF	NED	Timo Letschert ^{EL}
79	GK	ITA	Gianluca Pegolo ^{EL}
90	MF	ITA	Antonino Ragusa ^{EL}
97	FW	ITA	Giacomo Zecca
98	DF	ITA	Claud Adjapong ^{EL}

Players in the squad list submitted to UEFA for UEFA Europa League group stage are indicated by ^{EL}.

== Transfers ==
=== In ===
Date	Pos.	Player	Age	Moving from	Fee	Notes	Source
1 July 2016	MF	(Italy) Stefano Sensi		(Italy) Cesena		Loan return	
1 July 2016	MF	(Italy) Luca Mazzitelli		(Italy) Brescia		Loan return	
1 July 2016	DF	(Italy) Cristian Dell'Orco		(Italy) Novara		Loan return	
1 July 2016	FW	(Portugal) Aladje		(Italy) Ischia		Loan return	
1 July 2016	FW	(Italy) Matteo Politano	22	(Italy) Roma	Undisclosed	activate option in the loan contract	
3 August 2016	DF	(Netherlands) Timo Letschert	23	(Netherlands) Utrecht	Undisclosed		
16 August 2016	FW	(Italy) Alessandro Matri	31	(Italy) Milan	Undisclosed		
26 August 2016	MF	(Italy) Antonino Ragusa	26	(Italy) Cesena	Undisclosed		
31 August 2016	FW	(Italy) Pietro Iemmello	24	(Italy) Spezia	Undisclosed		
31 August 2016	DF	(Italy) Gian Marco Ferrari	24	(Italy) Crotone	Undisclosed	Return to Crotone on loan	
31 August 2016	FW	(Italy) Pietro Cianci		(Italy) Andria	Undisclosed	Return to Andria on loan	

==== Loans in ====
Date	Pos.	Player	Age	Moving from	Fee	Notes	Source
28 July 2016	DF	(Spain) Pol Lirola	18	(Italy) Juventus	Loan		
31 August 2016	MF	(Italy) Federico Ricci	22	(Italy) Roma	Loan		

=== Out ===
Date	Pos.	Player	Age	Moving to	Fee	Notes	Source
1 July 2016	DF	(Italy) Alessandro Longhi	27	Free agent	Free	End of contract	
5 July 2016	DF	(Croatia) Šime Vrsaljko	24	(Spain) Atlético Madrid	Undisclosed		
15 July 2016	MF	(Ghana) Raman Chibsah	23	(Italy) Benevento	Loan	Loan return on 1 July	
15 July 2016	FW	(Italy) Alessio Vita	23	(Italy) Vicenza	Loan	Loan return on 1 July	
7 August 2016	FW	(Italy) Nicola Sansone	24	(Spain) Villarreal	Undisclosed		
25 August 2016	DF	(Italy) Lorenzo Ariaudo	27	(Italy) Frosinone	Undisclosed	Loan return on 1 July	
27 August 2016	MF	(Italy) Karim Laribi	25	(Italy) Cesena	Loan		
27 August 2016	DF	(Switzerland) Jonathan Rossini	27	(Italy) Livorno	Loan	Loan return on 1 July	
31 August 2016	DF	(Italy) Leonardo Fontanesi	20	(Italy) Brescia	Loan	Loan return on 1 July	
31 August 2016	MF	(Italy) Giovanni Sbrissa	19	(Italy) Brescia	Loan	Loan return on 1 July	
31 August 2016	FW	(Italy) Diego Falcinelli	25	(Italy) Crotone	Loan		
31 August 2016	FW	(Italy) Marcello Trotta	23	(Italy) Crotone	Loan		

== Pre-season and friendlies ==
6 July 2016 Friendly	Sassuolo	9–1	Rappresentiva Montagna	Mals

9 July 2016 Friendly	Sassuolo	9–0	ASD Salorno	Mals

9 July 2016 Friendly	Sassuolo	14–0	FC Egna	Mals

13 July 2016 Friendly	Sassuolo	3–1	Stuttgarter Kickers	Mals

20 July 2016 Friendly	Sassuolo	1–0	Hapoel Haifa	Sassuolo
				Stadium: Enzo Ricci

21 July 2016 Friendly	Sassuolo	8–0	A.C.D. Castelvetro	Sassuolo
				Stadium: Enzo Ricci

10 August 2016 Trofeo TIM	Sassuolo	0–1	Celta Vigo	Reggio Emilia
		Report	Dražić 15'	Stadium: Mapei Stadium; Referee: Luca Pairetto
Note: 45-minute match

10 August 2016 Trofeo TIM	Sassuolo	3–2	Milan	Reggio Emilia
	Falcinelli 18'; Politano 31'; Trotta 39'	Report	Niang 2' (pen.), 10'	Stadium: Mapei Stadium; Referee: Massimiliano Irrati
Note: 45-minute match

== Competitions ==
=== Overall ===
Competition	Started round	Current position	Final position	First match	Last match
Serie A	Matchday 1	—	12th	21 August 2016	28 May 2017
Coppa Italia	Round of 16	—	Round of 16	18 January 2017	
Europa League	Third qualifying round	—	Group stage	28 July 2016	8 December 2016

Last updated: 28 May 2017

=== Serie A ===
==== League table ====
Pos	Team	Pld	W	D	L	GF	GA	GD	Pts
10	Sampdoria	38	12	12	14	49	55	−6	48
11	Cagliari	38	14	5	19	55	76	−21	47
12	Sassuolo	38	13	7	18	58	63	−5	46
13	Udinese	38	12	9	17	47	56	−9	45
14	Chievo	38	12	7	19	43	61	−18	43

Source: Serie A, Soccerway
Rules for classification: 1) Points; 2) Head-to-head points; 3) Head-to-head goal difference; 4) Goal difference; 5) Goals scored; 6) Draw.

==== Results summary ====
Overall								Home						Away					
Pld	W	D	L	GF	GA	GD	Pts	W	D	L	GF	GA	GD	W	D	L	GF	GA	GD
38	13	7	18	58	63	−5	46	7	3	9	27	28	−1	6	4	9	31	35	−4

Last updated: 28 May 2017.
Source: Competitive matches

==== Results by round ====
Round	1	2	3	4	5	6	7	8	9	10	11	12	13	14	15	16	17	18	19	20	21	22	23	24	25	26	27	28	29	30	31	32	33	34	35	36	37	38
Ground	A	H	A	H	A	H	A	H	A	H	A	H	A	A	H	A	H	A	H	H	A	H	A	H	A	H	A	H	A	H	A	H	H	A	H	A	H	A
Result	W	L	L	W	L	W	L	W	D	L	L	L	L	D	W	L	L	L	D	W	W	L	W	L	W	L	D	L	L	L	D	W	D	W	D	W	W	L
Position	7	13	17	11	13	9	13	10	9	13	16	16	16	16	15	15	16	16	16	16	14	16	13	15	12	13	12	13	15	15	15	15	14	14	14	14	11	12

Updated to match(es) played on 28 May 2017. Source: Competitive matches
A = Away; H = Home; W = Win; D = Draw; L = Loss

==== Matches ====
22 August 2016 1	Palermo	0–1	Sassuolo	Palermo
20:45 CEST (UTC+02:00)	Rajković (yellow card) 32' (yellow-red card) 90+1'; Quaison (yellow card) 80'	Report	Berardi 31' (pen.); Mazzitelli (yellow card) 41'; Consigli (yellow card) 90+3'	Stadium: Stadio Renzo Barbera; Attendance: 12,935; Referee: Luca Pairetto

28 August 2016 2	Sassuolo	0–3 (Awarded)	Pescara	Reggio Emilia
20:45 CEST (UTC+02:00)	Acerbi (yellow card) 26'; Defrel 38'; Berardi 67'; Biondini (yellow card) 90+3'	Report	Brugman (yellow card) 36'; Campagnaro (yellow card) 69'; Manaj 81'	Stadium: Mapei Stadium – Città del Tricolore; Attendance: 9,071; Referee: Paolo Tagliavento

10 September 2016 3	Juventus	3–1	Sassuolo	Turin
18:00 CEST (UTC+02:00)	Higuaín 5', 10'; Pjanić 27'; Benatia (yellow card) 85'	Report	Antei 33'; Gazzola (yellow card) 82'; Ricci (yellow card) 90+7'	Stadium: Juventus Stadium; Attendance: 39,519; Referee: Marco Di Bello

18 September 2016 4	Sassuolo	2–0	Genoa	Reggio Emilia
15:00 CEST (UTC+02:00)	Politano 58' (pen.); Defrel 66'	Report	Pavoletti (yellow card) 58'; Orbán (yellow card) 76'; Veloso (yellow card) 86' (red card) 86'	Stadium: Mapei Stadium – Città del Tricolore; Attendance: 10,134; Referee: Claudio Gavillucci

21 September 2016 5	Chievo	2–1	Sassuolo	Verona
20:45 CEST (UTC+02:00)	Rigoni 21'; Castro 40'; Meggiorini (yellow card) 60'; Sorrentino (yellow card) 90+4'	Report	Defrel 28'; Biondini (yellow card) 54'	Stadium: Stadio Marc'Antonio Bentegodi; Attendance: 9,000; Referee: Piero Giacomelli

25 September 2016 6	Sassuolo	1–0	Udinese	Reggio Emilia
15:00 CEST (UTC+02:00)	Defrel 34'; Peluso (yellow card) 44'; Biondini (yellow card) 71'; Magnanelli (yellow card) 88'	Report	Heurtaux (yellow card) 50'; Danilo (yellow card) 67'	Stadium: Mapei Stadium – Città del Tricolore; Attendance: 9,343; Referee: Daniele Doveri

2 October 2016 7	Milan	4–3	Sassuolo	Milan
18:00 CEST (UTC+02:00)	Bonaventura 9'; Montolivo (yellow card) 51'; Bacca 69' (pen.); Locatelli 73'; Paletta 77'	Report	Politano 10', (yellow card) 90+1'; Adjapong (yellow card) 23'; Acerbi 54'; Pellegrini 56', (yellow card) 76'; Antei (yellow card) 68'; Biondini (yellow card) 90+3'	Stadium: San Siro; Attendance: 31,738; Referee: Marco Guida

16 October 2016 8	Sassuolo	2–1	Crotone	Reggio Emilia
15:00 CEST (UTC+02:00)	Sensi 83'; Iemmello 86', (yellow card) 87'	Report	Falcinelli 2'; Crisetig (yellow card) 33'; Capezzi (yellow card) 85'; Palladino (yellow card) 90+1'	Stadium: Mapei Stadium – Città del Tricolore; Attendance: 11,569; Referee: Davide Massa

23 October 2016 9	Bologna	1–1	Sassuolo	Bologna
18:00 CEST (UTC+02:00)	Verdi 10'	Report	Pellegrini (yellow card) 77'; Matri 86'	Stadium: Stadio Renato Dall'Ara; Attendance: 20,201; Referee: Massimiliano Irrati

26 October 2016 10	Sassuolo	1–3	Roma	Reggio Emilia
20:45 CEST (UTC+02:00)	Cannavaro 12'; Mazzitelli (yellow card) 30'; Pellegrini (yellow card) 72'; Lirola (yellow card) 75'	Report	Džeko 57', 76' (pen.); Nainggolan 78'	Stadium: Mapei Stadium – Città del Tricolore; Attendance: 13,221; Referee: Antonio Damato

30 October 2016 11	Lazio	2–1	Sassuolo	Rome
15:00 CET (UTC+01:00)	Felipe Anderson (yellow card) 35'; Lulić (yellow card) 36', (goal) 50'; Immobile 55'	Report	Acerbi (yellow card) 33'; Defrel 57'	Stadium: Stadio Olimpico; Attendance: 12,000; Referee: Gianpaolo Calvarese

6 November 2016 12	Sassuolo	0–3	Atalanta	Reggio Emilia
15:00 CET (UTC+01:00)	Biondini (yellow card) 13'; Gazzola (yellow card) 45'; Peluso (yellow card) 70'; Ricci (yellow card) 79'	Report	Gómez 19'; Caldara 24'; Conti 43', (yellow card) 61'; Gagliardini (yellow card) 58'	Stadium: Mapei Stadium – Città del Tricolore; Attendance: 10,140; Referee: Fabio Maresca

20 November 2016 13	Sampdoria	3–2	Sassuolo	Genoa
12:30 CET (UTC+01:00)	Sala (yellow card) 18'; Škriniar (yellow card) 30'; Silvestre (yellow card) 52'; Torreira (yellow card) 76'; Quagliarella 84'; Muriel 85', 90+1' (pen.)	Report	Antei (yellow card) 21'; Missiroli (yellow card) 53'; Peluso (yellow card) 62'; Ricci 64'; Ragusa 74'	Stadium: Stadio Luigi Ferraris; Attendance: 20,052; Referee: Daniele Doveri

28 November 2016 14	Napoli	1–1	Sassuolo	Naples
19:00 CET (UTC+01:00)	Strinić (yellow card) 10'; Allan (yellow card) 13'; Insigne 42'; Mertens (yellow card) 66'	Report	Peluso (yellow card) 12'; Mazzitelli (yellow card) 37'; Ricci (yellow card) 47'; Ragusa (yellow card) 70'; Defrel 82'	Stadium: Stadio San Paolo; Attendance: 49,490; Referee: Paolo Valeri

4 December 2016 15	Sassuolo	3–0	Empoli	Reggio Emilia
15:00 CET (UTC+01:00)	Pellegrini 22' (pen.); Ricci 36' (pen.); Ragusa (yellow card) 44', (goal) 53'; Magnanelli (yellow card) 68'; Antei (yellow card) 69'; Mazzitelli (yellow card) 81'	Report	Skorupski (yellow card) 22'; Barba (yellow card) 34'; Croce (yellow card) 35'; Krunić (yellow card) 44'; Mauri (yellow card) 61'; Bellusci (yellow card) 66'	Stadium: Mapei Stadium – Città del Tricolore; Attendance: 9,588; Referee: Claudio Gavillucci

12 December 2016 16	Fiorentina	2–1	Sassuolo	Florence
19:00 CET (UTC+01:00)	Kalinić 10', 40', (yellow card) 90+3'; Salcedo (yellow card) 20'; Astori (yellow card) 67'	Report	Peluso (yellow card) 65'; Acerbi 76'	Stadium: Stadio Artemio Franchi; Attendance: 22,049; Referee: Michael Fabbri

18 December 2016 17	Sassuolo	0–1	Internazionale	Reggio Emilia
12:30 CET (UTC+01:00)	Missiroli (yellow card) 61'	Report	Candreva 47'; João Mário (yellow card) 68'; Brozović (yellow card) 72'; Melo (yellow card) 75' (yellow-red card) 90+2'; Gabriel (yellow card) 90+4'	Stadium: Mapei Stadium – Città del Tricolore; Attendance: 15,221; Referee: Marco Di Bello

22 December 2016 18	Cagliari	4–3	Sassuolo	Cagliari
20:45 CET (UTC+01:00)	Sau 14'; Farias (yellow card) 45', (goal) 73', 76'; Di Gennaro (yellow card) 49'; Borriello 62'; Padoin (yellow card) 67'	Report	Ragusa (yellow card) 3'; Adjapong (yellow card) 18', (goal) 29'; Pellegrini 33', (red card) 34'; Acerbi 58' (pen.); Mazzitelli (yellow card) 77'	Stadium: Stadio Sant'Elia; Attendance: 11,440; Referee: Domenico Celi

8 January 2017 19	Sassuolo	0–0	Torino	Reggio Emilia
15:00 CET (UTC+01:00)	Berardi (yellow card) 85'; Ragusa (yellow card) 90+2'	Report	Belotti (yellow card) 65'; Valdifiori (yellow card) 76'; Baselli (yellow card) 90+2'	Stadium: Mapei Stadium – Città del Tricolore; Attendance: 11,805; Referee: Massimiliano Irrati

15 January 2017 20	Sassuolo	4–1	Palermo	Reggio Emilia
15:00 CET (UTC+01:00)	Matri 15', 66'; Ragusa 24'; Mazzitelli (yellow card) 47'; Lirola (yellow card) 71'; Politano 83'	Report	Quaison 8', (yellow card) 33'; Goldaniga (yellow card) 74'	Stadium: Mapei Stadium – Città del Tricolore; Attendance: 9,074; Referee: Paolo Mazzoleni

22 January 2017 21	Pescara	1–3	Sassuolo	Pescara
15:00 CET (UTC+01:00)	Caprari (yellow card) 16'; Coda (yellow card) 20'; Bruno (yellow card) 44'; Bahebeck 56'; Cristante (yellow card) 84'	Report	Matri 1', 73', (yellow card) 25'; Berardi (yellow card) 39'; Pellegrini (yellow card) 44', (goal) 65'; Antei (yellow card) 89'; Politano (yellow card) 90'	Stadium: Stadio Adriatico – Giovanni Cornacchia; Attendance: 10,463; Referee: Paolo Valeri

29 January 2017 22	Sassuolo	0–2	Juventus	Reggio Emilia
15:00 CET (UTC+01:00)	Politano (yellow card) 23'; Mazzitelli (yellow card) 37'; Peluso (yellow card) 65'	Report	Higuaín 9'; Khedira 25'; Pjanić (yellow card) 58'	Stadium: Mapei Stadium – Città del Tricolore; Attendance: 21,584; Referee: Daniele Doveri

5 February 2017 23	Genoa	0–1	Sassuolo	Genoa
15:00 CET (UTC+01:00)	Cataldi (yellow card) 48'; Izzo (yellow card) 60'	Report	Pellegrini 26'; Aquilani (yellow card) 33'	Stadium: Stadio Luigi Ferraris; Attendance: 18,686; Referee: Carmine Russo

12 February 2017 24	Sassuolo	1–3	Chievo	Reggio Emilia
15:00 CET (UTC+01:00)	Letschert (red card) 4'; Matri 24'	Report	Dainelli (yellow card) 36'; Inglese 39', 56', 67'; Gobbi (yellow card) 45+2'; Gakpé (yellow card) 90'	Stadium: Mapei Stadium – Città del Tricolore; Attendance: 9,581; Referee: Luca Pairetto

19 February 2017 25	Udinese	1–2	Sassuolo	Udine
15:00 CET (UTC+01:00)	Fofana 7'; Hallfreðsson (yellow card) 30'; Danilo (yellow card) 67'; De Paul (yellow card) 90+2'	Report	Aquilani (yellow card) 20'; Peluso (yellow card) 49'; Defrel 70', 79'	Stadium: Stadio Friuli; Attendance: 17,719; Referee: Paolo Tagliavento

26 February 2017 26	Sassuolo	0–1	Milan	Reggio Emilia
15:00 CET (UTC+01:00)	Berardi (yellow card) 8'; Aquilani (yellow card) 21'; Defrel (yellow card) 24'; Peluso (yellow card) 25'; Pellegrini (yellow card) 58'; Duncan (yellow card) 90+3'	Report	Kucka (yellow card) 11'; Bacca 22' (pen.); Sosa (yellow card) 30'; Bertolacci (yellow card) 38'	Stadium: Mapei Stadium – Città del Tricolore; Attendance: 18,842; Referee: Gianpaolo Calvarese

5 March 2017 27	Crotone	0–0	Sassuolo	Crotone
15:00 CET (UTC+01:00)	Rosi (yellow card) 37'; Ceccherini (yellow card) 63'; Martella (yellow card) 66'	Report	Gazzola (yellow card) 73'	Stadium: Stadio Ezio Scida; Attendance: 7,544; Referee: Michael Fabbri

12 March 2017 28	Sassuolo	0–1	Bologna	Reggio Emilia
12:30 CET (UTC+01:00)	Cannavaro (yellow card) 25'; Berardi (yellow card) 41'; Politano (yellow card) 60'	Report	Helander (yellow card) 34'; Destro 58', (yellow card) 59'; Di Francesco (yellow card) 64'; Torosidis (yellow card) 64'; Masina (yellow card) 83'	Stadium: Mapei Stadium – Città del Tricolore; Attendance: 10,773; Referee: Paolo Valeri

19 March 2017 29	Roma	3–1	Sassuolo	Rome
20:45 CET (UTC+01:00)	Paredes 16'; Salah 45+2'; Džeko 68'; Strootman (yellow card) 90+4'	Report	Defrel 9'; Letschert (yellow card) 37'; Peluso (yellow card) 90+3'	Stadium: Stadio Olimpico; Attendance: 25,477; Referee: Marco Di Bello

1 April 2017 30	Sassuolo	1–2	Lazio	Reggio Emilia
18:00 CEST (UTC+02:00)	Berardi 26' (pen.); Pellegrini (yellow card) 32'; Lirola (yellow card) 89'	Report	Lulić (yellow card) 5'; Strakosha (yellow card) 26'; Hoedt (yellow card) 33'; Immobile 42'; Consigli 83' (o.g.); Keita (yellow card) 90'	Stadium: Mapei Stadium – Città del Tricolore; Attendance: 12,737; Referee: Piero Giacomelli

8 April 2017 31	Atalanta	1–1	Sassuolo	Bergamo
18:00 CEST (UTC+02:00)	Cristante (yellow card) 27', (goal) 73'; Petagna (yellow card) 29'; Gómez (yellow card) 81'	Report	Pellegrini 36'; Cannavaro (yellow card) 77'; Missiroli (yellow card) 90'; Duncan (yellow card) 90+2'; Berardi (yellow card) 90+4'	Stadium: Stadio Atleti Azzurri d'Italia; Attendance: 18,209; Referee: Nicola Rizzoli

15 April 2017 32	Sassuolo	2–1	Sampdoria	Reggio Emilia
18:00 CEST (UTC+02:00)	Pellegrini (yellow card) 24'; Peluso (yellow card) 45+2'; Ragusa 49'; Acerbi 56'; Politano (yellow card) 58'	Report	Bereszyński (yellow card) 20'; Schick 28'; Linetty (yellow card) 51'	Stadium: Mapei Stadium – Città del Tricolore; Attendance: 11,362; Referee: Luca Pairetto

23 April 2017 33	Sassuolo	2–2	Napoli	Reggio Emilia
12:30 CEST (UTC+02:00)	Berardi 59'; Mazzitelli (yellow card) 64', (goal) 80'; Sensi (yellow card) 77'; Duncan (yellow card) 88'	Report	Mertens 52'; Strinić (yellow card) 80'; Milik 84'	Stadium: Mapei Stadium – Città del Tricolore; Attendance: 18,870; Referee: Antonio Damato

30 April 2017 34	Empoli	1–3	Sassuolo	Empoli
15:00 CEST (UTC+02:00)	Pucciarelli 24' (pen.); Dioussé (yellow card) 65'; Maccarone (yellow card) 81'	Report	Duncan (yellow card) 8', (goal) 57'; Peluso 19'; Matri 34'; Letschert (yellow card) 52'; Sensi (yellow card) 81'	Stadium: Stadio Carlo Castellani; Attendance: 7,484; Referee: Daniele Doveri

7 May 2017 35	Sassuolo	2–2	Fiorentina	Reggio Emilia
15:00 CEST (UTC+02:00)	Ragusa (yellow card) 25'; Berardi (yellow card) 28'; Adjapong (yellow card) 32'; Politano 74' (pen.); Sensi (yellow card) 82'; Iemmello 85'; Ricci (yellow card) 90+3'	Report	Gonzalo (yellow card) 32' (yellow-red card) 72'; Chiesa 37', (yellow card) 39'; Vecino (yellow card) 48'; Bernardeschi 90+4'	Stadium: Mapei Stadium – Città del Tricolore; Attendance: 11,152; Referee: Claudio Gavillucci

14 May 2017 36	Internazionale	1–2	Sassuolo	Milan
12:30 CEST (UTC+02:00)	Éder 70', (yellow card) 84'; Ansaldi (yellow card) 74'; Gabriel (yellow card) 90+3'	Report	Iemmello 36', 50'; Peluso (yellow card) 69'	Stadium: San Siro; Attendance: 42,222; Referee: Davide Massa

21 May 2017 37	Sassuolo	6–2	Cagliari	Reggio Emilia
15:00 CEST (UTC+02:00)	Magnanelli 7'; Berardi 12'; Politano 13'; Borriello 34' (o.g.); Peluso (yellow card) 36'; Iemmello 56' (pen.); Matri 90'	Report	Sau 25', (yellow card) 85'; Pisacane (yellow card) 31'; Alves (yellow card) 54'; Borriello (yellow card) 56'; Ioniță 60'; Isla (yellow card) 72'	Stadium: Mapei Stadium – Città del Tricolore; Attendance: 10,806; Referee: Luigi Nasca

28 May 2017 38	Torino	5–3	Sassuolo	Turin
20:45 CEST (UTC+02:00)	Boyé 6', (yellow card) 18'; Baselli 22'; De Silvestri 45+1'; Falque 57'; Belotti 79'; Rossettini (yellow card) 90+3'	Report	Defrel 14', 40', 81' (pen.)	Stadium: Stadio Olimpico Grande Torino; Attendance: 16,803; Referee: Antonio Rapuano

Note

1. The Lega Serie A decided to award the match to Pescara against Sassuolo as a 3–0 forfeit win after Sassuolo were found guilty for fielding an ineligible player. The match originally ended 2–1 to Sassuolo.

=== Coppa Italia ===
18 January 2017 Round of 16	Sassuolo	1–2	Cesena	Reggio Emilia
17:30 CET (UTC+01:00)	Pellegrini 4'; Dell'Orco (yellow card) 45'; Antei (yellow card) 58'	Report	Ligi (yellow card) 28'; Ciano 81' (pen.); Laribi 84'; Rigione (yellow card) 90+1'; Cocco (yellow card) 90+5'	Stadium: Mapei Stadium – Città del Tricolore; Attendance: 1,920; Referee: Gianluca Rocchi

=== UEFA Europa League ===
==== Third qualifying round ====
28 July 2016 First leg	Luzern (Switzerland)	1–1	(Italy) Sassuolo	Lucerne, Switzerland
19:45 CEST (UTC+02:00)	M. Schneuwly 8'; Hyka (yellow card) 41'; Haas (yellow card) 62'; Lustenberger (yellow card) 70'	Report	Berardi 42' (pen.); Biondini (yellow card) 80'	Stadium: Swissporarena; Attendance: 10,555; Referee: Andreas Ekberg (Sweden)

4 August 2016 Second leg	Sassuolo (Italy)	3–0 (4–1 agg.)	(Switzerland) Luzern	Reggio Emilia, Italy
20:30 CEST (UTC+02:00)	Sansone (yellow card) 8'; Berardi 19', 39' (pen.); Defrel 64'	Report	Costa (red card) 38'	Stadium: Mapei Stadium – Città del Tricolore; Attendance: 13,415; Referee: Ali Palabıyık (Turkey)

==== Play-off round ====
18 August 2016 First leg	Sassuolo (Italy)	3–0	(Serbia) Red Star Belgrade	Reggio Emilia, Italy
20:45 CEST (UTC+02:00)	Berardi 17'; Politano 41'; Cannavaro (yellow card) 52'; Defrel 69'	Report	Cvetković (yellow card) 20'; Plavšić (yellow card) 66'	Stadium: Mapei Stadium – Città del Tricolore; Attendance: 6,861; Referee: Serdar Gözübüyük (Netherlands)

25 August 2016 Second leg	Red Star Belgrade (Serbia)	1–1 (1–4 agg.)	(Italy) Sassuolo	Belgrade, Serbia
20:30 CEST (UTC+02:00)	Katai 54'; Phibel (yellow card) 69'	Report	Berardi 28'; Magnanelli (yellow card) 47'; Peluso (yellow card) 81'	Stadium: Red Star Stadium; Attendance: 22,314; Referee: David Fernández Borbalán (Spain)

==== Group stage ====
Pos	Team	Pld	W	D	L	GF	GA	GD	Pts	Qualification	GNK	ATH	RW	SAS
1	(Belgium) Genk	6	4	0	2	13	9	+4	12	Advance to knockout phase	—	2–0	1–0	3–1
2	(Spain) Athletic Bilbao	6	3	1	2	10	11	−1	10	Advance to knockout phase	5–3	—	1–0	3–2
3	(Austria) Rapid Wien	6	1	3	2	7	8	−1	6		3–2	1–1	—	1–1
4	(Italy) Sassuolo	6	1	2	3	9	11	−2	5		0–2	3–0	2–2	—

Source: UEFA
Rules for classification: Group stage tiebreakers

15 September 2016 1	Sassuolo (Italy)	3–0	(Spain) Athletic Bilbao	Reggio Emilia, Italy
19:00 CEST (UTC+02:00)	Acerbi (yellow card) 54'; Lirola 60'; Mazzitelli (yellow card) 62'; Defrel 75'; Politano 82'	Report	García (yellow card) 90+4'	Stadium: Mapei Stadium – Città del Tricolore; Attendance: 7,032; Referee: Paweł Raczkowski (Poland)

29 September 2016 2	Genk (Belgium)	3–1	(Italy) Sassuolo	Genk, Belgium
21:05 CEST (UTC+02:00)	Karelis 8', (yellow card) 67'; Bailey 25'; Buffel 61'	Report	Peluso (yellow card) 35'; Politano 65', (yellow card) 86'	Stadium: Cristal Arena; Attendance: 9,130; Referee: Liran Liany (Israel)

20 October 2016 3	Rapid Wien (Austria)	1–1	(Italy) Sassuolo	Vienna, Austria
21:05 CEST (UTC+02:00)	Schaub 7'; Murg (yellow card) 59'	Report	Schrammel 66' (o.g.)	Stadium: Allianz Stadion; Attendance: 22,200; Referee: Hugo Miguel (Portugal)

3 November 2016 4	Sassuolo (Italy)	2–2	(Austria) Rapid Wien	Reggio Emilia, Italy
19:00 CET (UTC+01:00)	Gazzola (yellow card) 26'; Matri (yellow card) 28'; Defrel (yellow card) 34', (goal) 34'; Pellegrini 45+2'; Ragusa (yellow card) 64'; Peluso (yellow card) 85'	Report	Schaub (yellow card) 39'; Sonnleitner (yellow card) 45+1'; Močinić (yellow card) 60'; Jelić 86'; Kvilitaia 90', (yellow card) 90+3'	Stadium: Mapei Stadium – Città del Tricolore; Attendance: 7,838; Referee: Craig Pawson (England)

24 November 2016 5	Athletic Bilbao (Spain)	3–2	(Italy) Sassuolo	Bilbao, Spain
21:05 CET (UTC+01:00)	García 10', (yellow card) 37'; Aduriz (yellow card) 52', (goal) 58'; Laporte (yellow card) 76'; Lekue 79'	Report	Balenziaga 2' (o.g.); Acerbi (yellow card) 72'; Ragusa (yellow card) 78', (goal) 83'; Missiroli (yellow card) 90+3'; Magnanelli (yellow card) 90+4'	Stadium: San Mamés; Attendance: 37,806; Referee: Viktor Kassai (Hungary)

9 December 2016 6	Sassuolo (Italy)	0–2	(Belgium) Genk	Reggio Emilia, Italy
12:30 CET (UTC+01:00)	Mazzitelli (yellow card) 90+1'	Report	Heynen 58'; Trossard 80'	Stadium: Mapei Stadium – Città del Tricolore; Attendance: 1,154; Referee: Orel Grinfeeld (Israel)
Note: Originally scheduled for 19:00 on 8 December, postponed to 12:30 on 9 December due to fog.

== Statistics ==
=== Appearances and goals ===
No.	Pos	Nat	Player	Total		Serie A		Coppa Italia		Europa League	
No.	Pos	Nat	Player	Apps	Goals	Apps	Goals	Apps	Goals	Apps	Goals
Goalkeepers
1	GK	(Italy) ITA	Alberto Pomini	0	0	0	0	0	0	0	0
30	GK	(Italy) ITA	Bryan Costa	0	0	0	0	0	0	0	0
47	GK	(Italy) ITA	Andrea Consigli	46	0	37	0	0	0	9	0
79	GK	(Italy) ITA	Gianluca Pegolo	3	0	1	0	1	0	1	0
Defenders
5	DF	(Italy) ITA	Luca Antei	18	1	11+4	1	1	0	2	0
13	DF	(Italy) ITA	Federico Peluso	41	1	33+1	1	0	0	7	0
15	DF	(Italy) ITA	Francesco Acerbi	49	4	38	4	1	0	10	0
20	DF	(Spain) ESP	Pol Lirola	29	1	17+5	0	0	0	7	1
23	DF	(Italy) ITA	Marcello Gazzola	21	0	16	0	0	0	5	0
26	DF	(Italy) ITA	Emanuele Terranova	3	0	2+1	0	0	0	0	0
28	DF	(Italy) ITA	Paolo Cannavaro	25	1	16+2	1	0	0	7	0
39	DF	(Italy) ITA	Cristian Dell'Orco	10	0	9	0	1	0	0	0
55	DF	(Netherlands) NED	Timo Letschert	12	0	9	0	0	0	2+1	0
98	DF	(Ghana) GHA	Claud Adjapong	13	1	6+3	1	1	0	2+1	0
Midfielders
4	MF	(Italy) ITA	Francesco Magnanelli	24	1	14+1	1	0	0	8+1	0
6	MF	(Italy) ITA	Lorenzo Pellegrini	34	8	24+4	6	1	1	4+1	1
7	MF	(Italy) ITA	Simone Missiroli	15	0	9+4	0	0	0	1+1	0
8	MF	(Italy) ITA	Davide Biondini	22	0	9+5	0	0	0	8	0
12	MF	(Italy) ITA	Stefano Sensi	19	1	14+2	1	1	0	0+2	0
21	MF	(Italy) ITA	Alberto Aquilani	16	0	14+2	0	0	0	0	0
22	MF	(Italy) ITA	Luca Mazzitelli	23	1	12+5	1	0+1	0	3+2	0
32	MF	(Ghana) GHA	Alfred Duncan	27	1	14+7	1	1	0	4+1	0
Forwards
9	FW	(Italy) ITA	Pietro Iemmello	18	5	3+14	5	1	0	0	0
10	FW	(Italy) ITA	Alessandro Matri	37	8	16+15	8	0	0	4+2	0
11	FW	(France) FRA	Grégoire Defrel	38	16	23+6	12	0+1	0	7+1	4
16	FW	(Italy) ITA	Matteo Politano	42	6	25+7	4	1	0	5+4	2
25	FW	(Italy) ITA	Domenico Berardi	25	10	20+1	5	0	0	4	5
27	FW	(Italy) ITA	Federico Ricci	31	2	10+14	2	0+1	0	3+3	0
31	FW	(Italy) ITA	Simone Caputo	2	0	0	0	0	0	1+1	0
33	FW	(Italy) ITA	Simone Franchini	1	0	0	0	0	0	0+1	0
90	FW	(Italy) ITA	Antonino Ragusa	32	5	16+9	4	1	0	4+2	1
Players transferred out during the season
9	FW	(Italy) ITA	Diego Falcinelli	5	0	0+1	0	0	0	0+4	0
10	FW	(Italy) ITA	Nicola Sansone	2	0	0	0	0	0	2	0
29	FW	(Italy) ITA	Marcello Trotta	2	0	0	0	0	0	0+2	0

Last updated: 28 May 2017
Source: Competitions

=== Goalscorers ===
Rank	No.	Pos	Nat	Name	Serie A	Coppa Italia	UEFA EL	Total
1	11	FW	(France)	Grégoire Defrel	12	0	4	16
2	25	FW	(Italy)	Domenico Berardi	5	0	5	10
3	6	MF	(Italy)	Lorenzo Pellegrini	6	1	1	8
4	10	FW	(Italy)	Alessandro Matri	8	0	0	8
4	16	FW	(Italy)	Matteo Politano	5	0	3	8
6	9	FW	(Italy)	Pietro Iemmello	5	0	0	5
6	90	FW	(Italy)	Antonino Ragusa	4	0	1	5
8	15	DF	(Italy)	Francesco Acerbi	4	0	0	4
9	27	FW	(Italy)	Federico Ricci	2	0	0	2
10	4	MF	(Italy)	Francesco Magnanelli	1	0	0	1
10	5	DF	(Italy)	Luca Antei	1	0	0	1
10	12	MF	(Italy)	Stefano Sensi	1	0	0	1
10	13	DF	(Italy)	Federico Peluso	1	0	0	1
10	20	DF	(Spain)	Pol Lirola	0	0	1	1
10	22	MF	(Italy)	Luca Mazzitelli	1	0	0	1
10	28	DF	(Italy)	Paolo Cannavaro	1	0	0	1
10	32	MF	(Ghana)	Alfred Duncan	1	0	0	1
10	98	DF	(Ghana)	Claud Adjapong	1	0	0	1
Own goal					1	0	2	3
Totals					60	1	17	78

Last updated: 28 May 2017

=== Clean sheets ===
Rank	No.	Pos	Nat	Name	Serie A	Coppa Italia	UEFA EL	Total
1	47	GK	(Italy)	Andrea Consigli	7	0	3	10
Totals					7	0	3	10

Last updated: 28 May 2017

=== Disciplinary record ===
No.	Pos	Nat	Player	Serie A			Coppa Italia			UEFA EL			Total		
No.	Pos	Nat	Player	Booked	(yellow card) (yellow-red card)	Sent off (straight red)	Booked	(yellow card) (yellow-red card)	Sent off (straight red)	Booked	(yellow card) (yellow-red card)	Sent off (straight red)	Booked	(yellow card) (yellow-red card)	Sent off (straight red)
1	GK	(Italy)	Alberto Pomini	0	0	0	0	0	0	0	0	0	0	0	0
30	GK	(Italy)	Bryan Costa	0	0	0	0	0	0	0	0	0	0	0	0
47	GK	(Italy)	Andrea Consigli	1	0	0	0	0	0	0	0	0	1	0	0
79	GK	(Italy)	Gianluca Pegolo	0	0	0	0	0	0	0	0	0	0	0	0
5	DF	(Italy)	Luca Antei	4	0	0	1	0	0	0	0	0	5	0	0
13	DF	(Italy)	Federico Peluso	12	0	0	0	0	0	3	0	0	15	0	0
15	DF	(Italy)	Francesco Acerbi	2	0	0	0	0	0	2	0	0	4	0	0
20	DF	(Spain)	Pol Lirola	3	0	0	0	0	0	0	0	0	3	0	0
23	DF	(Italy)	Marcello Gazzola	3	0	0	0	0	0	1	0	0	4	0	0
26	DF	(Italy)	Emanuele Terranova	0	0	0	0	0	0	0	0	0	0	0	0
28	DF	(Italy)	Paolo Cannavaro	2	0	0	0	0	0	1	0	0	3	0	0
39	DF	(Italy)	Cristian Dell'Orco	0	0	0	1	0	0	0	0	0	1	0	0
55	DF	(Netherlands)	Timo Letschert	2	0	1	0	0	0	0	0	0	2	0	1
98	DF	(Ghana)	Claud Adjapong	3	0	0	0	0	0	0	0	0	3	0	0
4	MF	(Italy)	Francesco Magnanelli	2	0	0	0	0	0	2	0	0	4	0	0
6	MF	(Italy)	Lorenzo Pellegrini	7	0	1	0	0	0	0	0	0	7	0	1
7	MF	(Italy)	Simone Missiroli	3	0	0	0	0	0	1	0	0	4	0	0
8	MF	(Italy)	Davide Biondini	5	0	0	0	0	0	1	0	0	6	0	0
12	MF	(Italy)	Stefano Sensi	3	0	0	0	0	0	0	0	0	3	0	0
21	MF	(Italy)	Alberto Aquilani	3	0	0	0	0	0	0	0	0	3	0	0
22	MF	(Italy)	Luca Mazzitelli	8	0	0	0	0	0	2	0	0	10	0	0
32	MF	(Ghana)	Alfred Duncan	4	0	0	0	0	0	0	0	0	4	0	0
9	FW	(Italy)	Pietro Iemmello	1	0	0	0	0	0	0	0	0	1	0	0
10	FW	(Italy)	Alessandro Matri	1	0	0	0	0	0	1	0	0	2	0	0
10	FW	(Italy)	Nicola Sansone	0	0	0	0	0	0	1	0	0	1	0	0
11	FW	(France)	Grégoire Defrel	1	0	0	0	0	0	0	0	0	1	0	0
16	FW	(Italy)	Matteo Politano	5	0	0	0	0	0	2	0	0	7	0	0
25	FW	(Italy)	Domenico Berardi	6	0	0	0	0	0	0	0	0	6	0	0
27	FW	(Italy)	Federico Ricci	4	0	0	0	0	0	0	0	0	4	0	0
31	FW	(Italy)	Simone Caputo	0	0	0	0	0	0	0	0	0	0	0	0
33	FW	(Italy)	Simone Franchini	0	0	0	0	0	0	0	0	0	0	0	0
90	FW	(Italy)	Antonino Ragusa	5	0	0	0	0	0	2	0	0	7	0	0
Totals				90	0	2	2	0	0	19	0	0	111	0	2

Last updated: 28 May 2017
