= Marlon (footballer, born September 1995) =

Brazilian footballer

Personal information
- Full name: Marlon Santos da Silva Barbosa
- Date of birth: 7 September 1995 (age 31)
- Place of birth: Duque de Caxias, Brazil
- Height: 1.84 m (6 ft 0 in)
- Position: Centre-back

Team information
- Current team: Shakhtar Donetsk
- Number: 4

Youth career
- 2009–2014: Fluminense

Senior career*
Years	Team	Apps	(Gls)
2013–2017	Fluminense	62	(0)
2016–2017	→ Barcelona B (loan)	22	(0)
2016–2017	→ Barcelona (loan)	2	(0)
2017–2018	Barcelona	0	(0)
2017–2018	→ Nice (loan)	23	(0)
2018–2021	Sassuolo	65	(1)
2021–2024	Shakhtar Donetsk	12	(0)
2022–2023	→ Monza (loan)	28	(0)
2023–2024	→ Fluminense (loan)	19	(0)
2024–2025	Los Angeles FC	16	(1)
2025–	Shakhtar Donetsk	12	(0)

International career^{‡}
2015	Brazil U20	12	(0)
- * Club domestic league appearances and goals as of 3 May 2026 ‡ National team caps and goals as of 26 August 2025

Marlon Santos da Silva Barbosa (born 7 September 1995), known as Marlon or Marlon Santos, is a Brazilian professional footballer who plays for Shakhtar Donetsk.

== Club career ==
=== Fluminense ===
Marlon joined the Fluminense academy at the age of 14; after progressing through the youth ranks, in 2014 he made his debut for Fluminense at the age of 18, in the Campeonato Brasileiro Série A, versus São Paulo in a 5–2 victory. Marlon ended his first season with 20 league appearances, and played twice in the Copa Sudamericana.

Having missed the first part of the 2015 season due to international duty with Brazil U20, Marlon returned for the second half where he played as a starter for Fluminense. He played 24 games in the league.

=== Barcelona ===
On 8 June 2016, Marlon signed for Barcelona on a season-long loan. He played as a starter for their B team, helping them gain promotion from the Segunda División B (third division) to the Segunda División (second division) with 27 appearances between the regular season and the promotion play-offs.

Marlon made his debut for the first team on 23 November 2016, in a Champions League group stage game against Celtic, coming on as a substitute in the 72nd minute for Gerard Piqué. Marlon's La Liga debut came against Las Palmas on 14 May 2017. After impressing on loan, Barcelona activated Marlon's loan clause from Fluminense for €5 million on a four-year contract.

==== Nice (loan) ====
In August 2017, Nice signed Marlon on loan. He made his debut in Ligue 1 against Monaco in a 4–0 win, and played a total of 23 league games. Marlon's loan ended early at the end of the 2017–18 season as manager Patrick Vieira announced that Marlon would no longer form part of his squad.

=== Sassuolo ===
On 16 August 2018, Marlon signed for Serie A club Sassuolo for an initial fee of €6 million with a buy-back clause in Barcelona's favour. Upon 50 games played Sassuolo would owe Barcelona another €6 million. Marlon made his debut on matchday 2 against Cagliari; he was sent out for a second yellow card in added time. Nevertheless, he impressed head coach Roberto De Zerbi who fielded him for 15 consecutive games as a starter without subbing him off. He made 18 appearances in the 2018–19 Serie A season, scoring once against Bologna on 28 October.

The following two seasons (2019–20 and 2020–21), Marlon played 47 total games in the league.

=== Shakhtar Donetsk ===
On 22 June 2021, Shakhtar Donetsk announced the signing of Marlon on a five-year contract, where he reunited with former Sassuolo coach De Zerbi. He played 12 league games, and helped Shakhtar win the 2021 Ukrainian Super Cup.

==== Monza (loan) ====
On 5 August 2022, Marlon returned to Serie A, signing for newly-promoted side Monza for one year. He made his debut on 8 August, in a 3–2 Coppa Italia win against Frosinone.

==== Fluminense (loan) ====
On 12 July 2023, Marlon returned to Fluminense on a one-year loan.

=== Los Angeles FC ===
On 11 September 2024, Marlon joined Los Angeles FC as a free agent. During his spell at the club, heappeared in 16 MLS matches (starting eight) for the Black and Gold over parts of the 2024 and 2025 seasons. Marlon made his debut for LAFC as a substitute in the 2024 Lamar Hunt U.S. Open Cup Final, helping the club secure a 3-1 overtime win to lift their first Open Cup Trophy. He scored one goal for the club against San Jose on Decision Day 2024, heading home with the decisive goal in extra time to help LAFC claim the top seed in the Western Conference Playoffs.

On 24 December, he re-signed with the club through 30 June 2025, with options to extend through the end of the 2025 season and 2026 season. On 3 July 2025, LAFC announced that they could not come to an agreement to renew his contract, which had expired June 30th.

=== Shakhtar Donetsk ===
On 11 July 2025, Marlon returned to Ukraine, rejoining Shakhtar on a free transfer.

On 19 May 2026, Shakhtar announced that Marlon had extended his contract with the club until the 30 June 2028.

== International career ==
Marlon represented Brazil internationally at the under-20 level at the 2015 FIFA U-20 World Cup, helping his side reach the final which they lost after extra time against Serbia. He also played at the 2015 South American U-20 Championship.

== Style of play ==
Marlon is a centre-back who can play in a back three, either on the left or the right. He is known for his physicality, stamina and heading, and can set up the game from the back with his passing. Serhiy Palkin, CEO of Shakhtar, defined Marlon as "one of the best defenders in Europe technically".

== Personal life ==
Marlon and his girlfriend Maria have two sons, Pedro and João Miguel Santos.

== Career statistics ==
As of match played 3 May 2026

Appearances and goals by club, season and competition
Club	Season	League			State league (Note: Includes Campeonato Carioca)		National cup (Note: Includes Copa do Brasil, Copa del Rey, Coupe de France, Coppa Italia, Ukrainian Cup)		League cup (Note: Includes Coupe de la Ligue)		Continental		Other		Total	
Club	Season	Division	Apps	Goals	Apps	Goals	Apps	Goals	Apps	Goals	Apps	Goals	Apps	Goals	Apps	Goals
Fluminense	2014	Série A	20	0	0	0	—		—		2 (Note: Appearances in Copa Sudamericana)	0	—		22	0
Fluminense	2015	Série A	24	0	10	0	6	0	—		—		—		40	0
Fluminense	2016	Série A	1	0	7	0	—		—		—		—		8	0
Fluminense	Total		45	0	17	0	6	0	0	0	2	0	0	0	70	0
Barcelona B (loan)	2016–17	Segunda División B	22	0	—		—		—		—		5 (Note: Appearances in Segunda División B promotion play-offs)	0	27	0
Barcelona (loan)	2016–17	La Liga	2	0	—		0	0	—		1 (Note: Appearance in UEFA Champions League)	0	—		3	0
Nice (loan)	2017–18	Ligue 1	23	0	—		0	0	1	0	3 (Note: Appearances in UEFA Europa League)	0	—		27	0
Sassuolo	2018–19	Serie A	18	1	—		0	0	—		—		—		18	1
Sassuolo	2019–20	Serie A	23	0	—		0	0	—		—		—		23	0
Sassuolo	2020–21	Serie A	24	0	—		1	0	—		—		—		25	0
Sassuolo	Total		65	1	0	0	1	0	0	0	0	0	0	0	66	1
Shakhtar Donetsk	2021–22	Ukrainian Premier League	12	0	—		0	0	—		9	0	1 (Note: Appearance in Ukrainian Super Cup)	0	22	0
Monza (loan)	2022–23	Serie A	11	0	—		1	0	—		—		—		12	0
Fluminense (loan)	2023	Série A	15	0	0	0	0	0	—		5 (Note: Appearances in Copa Libertadores)	0	2 (Note: Appearances in FIFA Club World Cup)	0	22	0
Fluminense (loan)	2024	Série A	4	0	2	0	0	0	—		1	0	1 (Note: One appearance in Recopa Sudamericana)	0	8	0
Fluminense (loan)	Total		19	0	2	0	0	0	—		6	0	3	0	30	0
Los Angeles FC	2024	MLS	5	1	—		1	0	—		—		2 (Note: Appearances in MLS Cup Playoffs)	0	8	0
Los Angeles FC	2025	MLS	11	1	—		0	0	—		4 (Note: Appearances in CONCACAF Champions Cup)	0	4 (Note: Appearances in FIFA Club World Cup)	0	19	1
Los Angeles FC	Total		16	2	—		1	0	—		4	0	6	0	27	1
Shakhtar Donetsk	2025–26	Ukrainian Premier League	12	0	—		1	0	—		3 (Note: Appearances in UEFA Conference League)	0	—		16	0
Career total			226	3	19	0	10	0	1	0	28	0	15	0	300	4

== Honours ==
Fluminense

- Copa Libertadores: 2023
- Recopa Sudamericana: 2024
- Primeira Liga: 2016

Barcelona

- Copa del Rey: 2016–17

Shakhtar Donetsk

- Ukrainian Super Cup: 2021

Los Angeles FC

- U.S. Open Cup: 2024

Brazil U20

- FIFA U-20 World Cup runner-up: 2015
