= Filippo Romagna =

Italian footballer (born 1997)

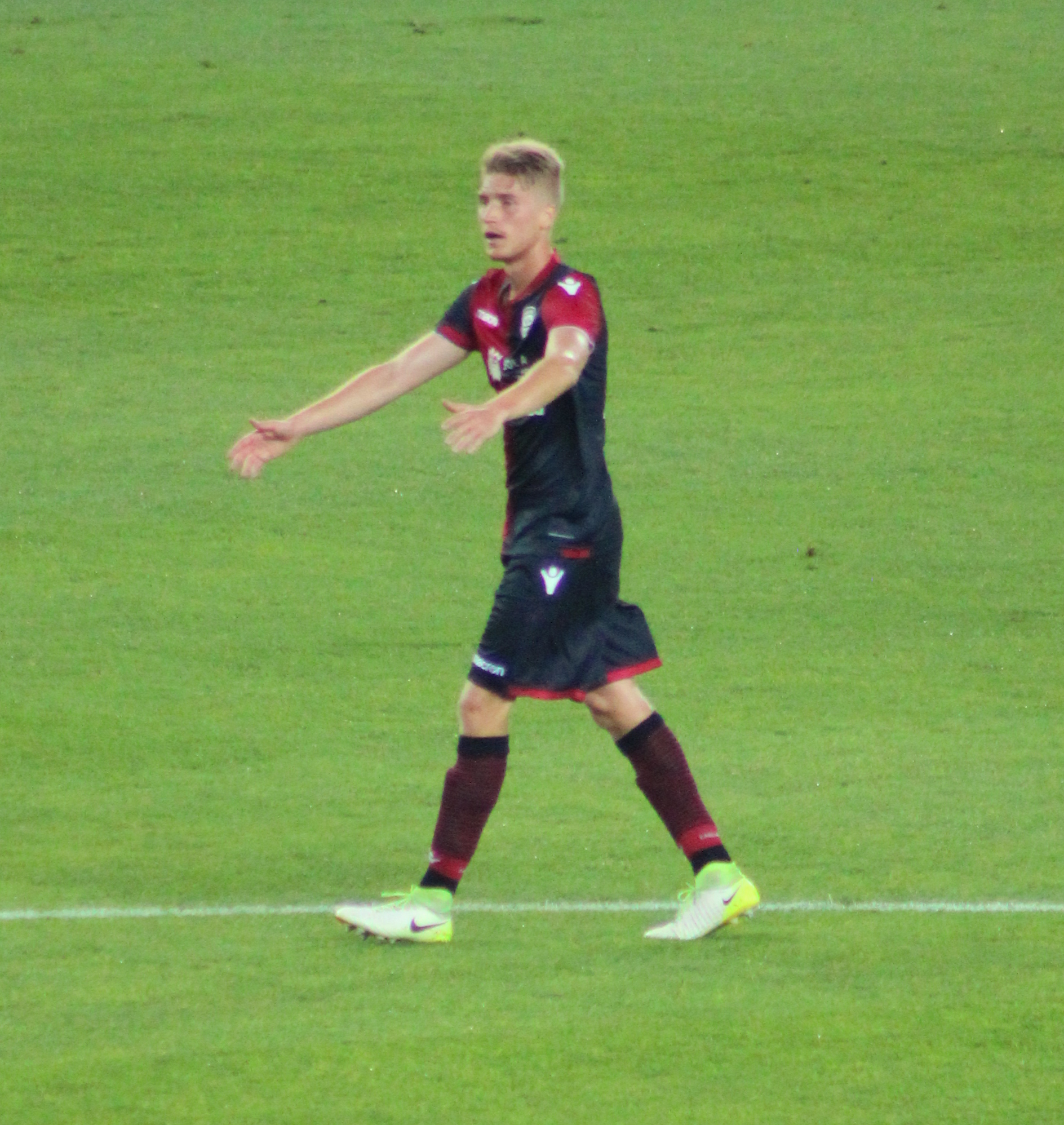
- Romagna plays with Cagliari in 2017

Personal information
- Full name: Filippo Romagna
- Date of birth: 26 May 1997 (age 29)
- Place of birth: Fano, Italy
- Height: 1.86 m (6 ft 1 in)
- Position: Centre back

Youth career
- Fanella
- 2007–2011: Rimini
- 2011–2016: Juventus

Senior career*
Years	Team	Apps	(Gls)
2016–2017	Juventus	0	(0)
2016–2017	→ Novara (loan)	4	(0)
2017	→ Brescia (loan)	14	(0)
2017–2020	Cagliari	41	(0)
2019–2020	→ Sassuolo (loan)	18	(0)
2020–2026	Sassuolo	30	(0)
2023–2024	→ Reggiana (loan)	13	(0)

International career^{‡}
2013–2014	Italy U17	5	(0)
2015–2016	Italy U19	14	(0)
2016–2017	Italy U20	9	(0)
2017–2019	Italy U21	16	(0)
Medal record
Men's football
Representing Italy
FIFA U-20 World Cup
Third place	2017 South Korea
UEFA European Under-19 Championship
Runner-up	2016 Germany
- * Club domestic league appearances and goals as of 25 May 2026 ‡ National team caps and goals as of 25 March 2019

Filippo Romagna (born 26 May 1997) is an Italian professional footballer who plays as centre-back.

== Club career ==
=== Early career ===
Born in 1997, Romagna started his football career with the local team in his hometown, Fano. At the age of 10, Romagna moved to Rimini. In 2011, Internazionale tried to sign with Romagna but he eventually joined Juventus F.C. Youth Sector. During his stay within Juventus academy, he became also captain of the Under-19 team, which plays in Campionato Nazionale Primavera.

=== Juventus ===
==== Loan to Novara and Brescia ====
On 29 August 2016, he was loaned to Serie B club Novara until the end of 2016–17 season. On 22 October, he made his professional and league debut against at Stadio Silvio Piola, replacing Gianluca Sansone in the 79th minute of a 1–0 home win over Avellino. On 29 November. Romagna played in the fourth round of Coppa Italia in a 3–0 away defeat against ChievoVerona, he played the full match. Romangna ended his loan with only five appearances. In January he was recall to the first team.

In January 2017 he was sent on loan to Serie B club Brescia, in order to find more playing time. He made his debut with Brescia on 24 February 2017, in the league match won 4–1 against Cittadella. Romagna ended his six-month loan to Brescia with 14 appearances, all as a starter.

=== Cagliari ===
On 28 July 2017, Cagliari confirmed the signing of Romagna on a five-year contract. On 17 September he made his debut for Cagliari in Serie A as a substitute, replacing Joao Pedro in the 91st minute of 2–0 away win over SPAL.

==== Loan to Sassuolo ====
On 2 September 2019, Romagna joined Sassuolo on loan until 30 June 2020.

=== Sassuolo ===
On 17 September 2020, Romagna signed to Sassuolo.

== International career ==
Romagna has represented his country at various age groups. On 19 October 2013, he was first called up and played for Italy U17 against Ukraine U17. With the Italy U19 he took part at the 2016 UEFA European Under-19 Championship, playing five games in the tournament, Italy finishing the competition as a runners-up.

With the Italy U20 he took part at the 2017 FIFA U-20 World Cup, where Italy finished in third place.

He made his debut with the Italy U21 team on 1 September 2017, in a friendly match lost 3–0 against Spain.

== Career statistics ==
=== Club ===
As of match played 9 May 2025

Appearances and goals by club, season and competition
Club	Season	League			National Cup (Note: Includes Coppa Italia)		Continental		Other		Total	
Club	Season	Division	Apps	Goals	Apps	Goals	Apps	Goals	Apps	Goals	Apps	Goals
Novara (loan)	2016–17	Serie B	4	0	1	0	—		—		5	0
Brescia (loan)	2016–17	Serie B	14	0	0	0	—		—		14	0
Cagliari	2017–18	Serie A	23	0	1	0	—		—		24	0
Cagliari	2018–19	Serie A	18	0	3	0	—		—		21	0
Cagliari	Total		41	0	4	0	—		—		45	0
Sassuolo (loan)	2019–20	Serie A	18	0	0	0	—		—		18	0
Sassuolo	2022–23	Serie A	2	0	0	0	—		—		2	0
Sassuolo	2024–25	Serie B	23	0	1	0	—		—		24	0
Sassuolo	Total		43	0	1	0	—		—		44	0
Reggiana (loan)	2023–24	Serie B	13	0	2	0	—		—		15	0
Career total			115	0	8	0	—		—		123	0

== Honours ==
Sassuolo

- Serie B: 2024–25

Italy U19

- UEFA European Under-19 Championship runner-up: 2016

Italy U20

- FIFA U-20 World Cup bronze medal: 2017
