= Jérémie Boga =

Ivorian-French footballer (born 1997)

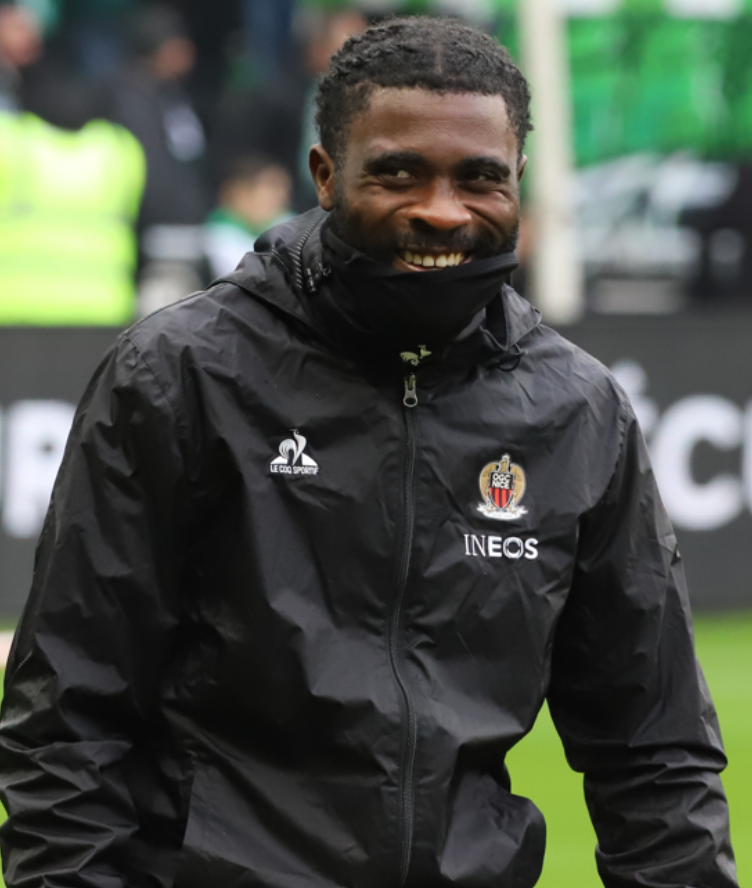
- Boga with Nice in 2025

Personal information
- Full name: Jérémie Boga
- Date of birth: 3 January 1997 (age 29)
- Place of birth: Marseille, France
- Height: 1.72 m (5 ft 8 in)
- Positions: Attacking midfielder; winger

Team information
- Current team: Juventus
- Number: 13

Youth career
- 2003–2009: ASPTT Marseille
- 2009–2015: Chelsea

Senior career*
Years	Team	Apps	(Gls)
2015–2018	Chelsea	1	(0)
2015–2016	→ Rennes (loan)	27	(2)
2016–2017	→ Granada (loan)	26	(2)
2017–2018	→ Birmingham City (loan)	31	(2)
2018–2022	Sassuolo	98	(18)
2022	→ Atalanta (loan)	15	(0)
2022–2023	Atalanta	23	(2)
2023–2026	Nice	63	(9)
2026	→ Juventus (loan)	15	(4)
2026–	Juventus	7	(1)

International career^{‡}
2014–2016	France U19	7	(0)
2017–	Ivory Coast	25	(2)
Medal record
Representing Ivory Coast
Men's football
Africa Cup of Nations
Winner	2023
- * Club domestic league appearances and goals as of 07:39, 2 November 2026 (UTC) ‡ National team caps and goals as of 10 June 2025

Jérémie Boga (born 3 January 1997) is a professional footballer who plays as an attacking midfielder or winger for Serie A club Juventus. Born in France, he plays for the Ivory Coast national team.

Coming through Chelsea's youth system, Boga spent the 2015–16 season on loan to Rennes and the 2016–17 season with Granada, also on loan, before making his first-team debut for Chelsea in August 2017. He then joined EFL Championship club Birmingham City on loan for the remainder of the season. In 2018, he moved to Italian club Sassuolo on a permanent deal.

Internationally, Boga represented his native France up to under-19 level, but then chose to play for his parents' country, Ivory Coast, at senior level. He was also eligible to represent England.

== Club career ==
=== Chelsea ===
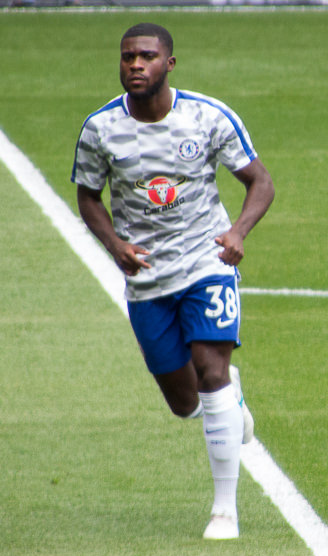
Boga playing for Chelsea in 2017

In 2008, Boga joined Chelsea from ASPTT Marseille as a youngster when he moved with his family to London, where his father worked. He was educated at Richard Challoner School in New Malden. After impressing in Chelsea's Academy, he earned himself his first professional contract, therefore keeping at the London-based club until 2017.

He was named on the bench for Chelsea's final game of the 2014–15 season, a 3–1 victory against Sunderland in the Premier League, but he remained unused.

==== Rennes (loan) ====
On 31 August 2015, Boga joined Rennes on a season-long loan to gain first team experience since his impressive spell in the Chelsea youth system. He made his debut on 18 September, as an 82nd-minute substitute for Paul-Georges Ntep in a 1–1 draw with Lille in Ligue 1. At the beginning of October, Boga made a single appearance for Rennes' reserve team against GSI Pontivy, in which he scored the only goal of the game, converting a penalty in the first-half. On 28 November 2015, in his first start for the team, Boga scored his first professional goal, against Stade de Reims which resulted in a 2–2 draw. His second goal of the season took the Round of 64 Coupe de France match against OGC Nice into extra time. The game went to penalties, and Rennes won the shootout 7–6. On 9 January 2016, Boga scored his third goal of the season in a 2–2 draw with Lorient.

==== Granada (loan) ====
On 6 July 2016, Boga joined La Liga club Granada on a season-long loan. He made his Granada debut on 20 August in a 1–1 draw with Villarreal, playing the full 90 minutes. A week later, Boga scored his first goal in a 5–1 home defeat against Las Palmas, scoring Granada's equalizer after Las Palmas took the lead through former Liverpool player Nabil El Zhar. On 2 April 2017, Boga scored the equalizing goal against Barcelona. Granada lost the game 4–1.

==== Chelsea debut and loan to Birmingham City ====
Boga returned to Chelsea for the 2017–18 season and unexpectedly started in their first game of the season against Burnley. However, he was substituted in the 18th minute after Gary Cahill was sent off. He signed a new three-year contract with Chelsea before, on 28 August 2017, joining Championship club Birmingham City on loan for the 2017–18 season.

He was one of six debutants in Birmingham's next fixture, away to Norwich City. He played the whole match as his team lost 1–0, and continued in the side for the next five league matches. Incoming manager Steve Cotterill imposed a fitness programme on the players, and on Boga in particular, who did not start another match for two months. When he did return, in a 1–1 draw away to Sheffield United on 25 November, he opened the scoring with his first goal for Birmingham. After the defence failed to clear a corner, "an unmarked Boga jinked on the edge of the area before thumping a curling effort past Blackman's outstretched hands"; the goal won him the club's Goal of the Season award. Two weeks later, with his side losing 1–0 away to Fulham with 15 minutes left, he missed a penalty, hitting his shot too high. Cotterill continued to select Boga, and he scored his second Birmingham goal with a powerful header in a 3–1 win against Sunderland in late January that lifted his team out of the relegation positions. He played less under Cotterill's successor, Garry Monk, and not at all in the last few weeks of the season, as Birmingham narrowly avoided relegation. In all competitions, he made 34 appearances, 25 of which were starts.

=== Sassuolo ===
On 21 July 2018, he moved to Sassuolo on a permanent transfer for a fee reported to be around £3.5 million.

=== Atalanta ===
On 24 January 2022, Boga moved to Atalanta, initially on loan, with Atalanta holding an obligation to make the deal permanent. His deal was made permanent at the end of the 2021–22 season. In one and a half seasons at the club, Boga contributed four goals and six assists across all competitions.

=== Nice ===
On 25 July 2023, Ligue 1 side Nice announced the signing of Boga on a long-term contract, for a reported fee of €18 million.

On 30 November 2025, after a run of six consecutive defeats, Boga and several other Nice players were attacked by supporters as they got off the team bus following their 3–1 loss away to Lorient. As a result, Boga was placed on sick leave for five days.

==== Juventus ====
On 1 February 2026, Boga initially joined Juventus on loan until 30 June 2026, with an option to make the move permanent. Boga made his Juventus debut on 5 February 2026, coming on as a second half sub in a 3-0 away loss to Atalanta in the Coppa Italia. On 1 March 2026, Boga opened his account for Juventus against AS Roma, scoring in a 3-3 draw.

On 15 June 2026, Juventus announced they had signed Boga permanently from Nice for a fee of €4.8 million. Boga signed a contract with Juventus through 30 June 2029.

== International career ==
Boga has been capped by France at under-16 and under-19 levels. In April 2017, it was announced that Boga had committed to playing for the Ivory Coast internationally. He was called up to the Ivory Coast national team for the first time for a friendly match against the Netherlands and an African Cup of Nations qualifier against Guinea on 4 and 10 June 2017. He made his debut in the latter, coming on for Jean Michaël Seri in the 77th minute of a 3–2 home defeat.

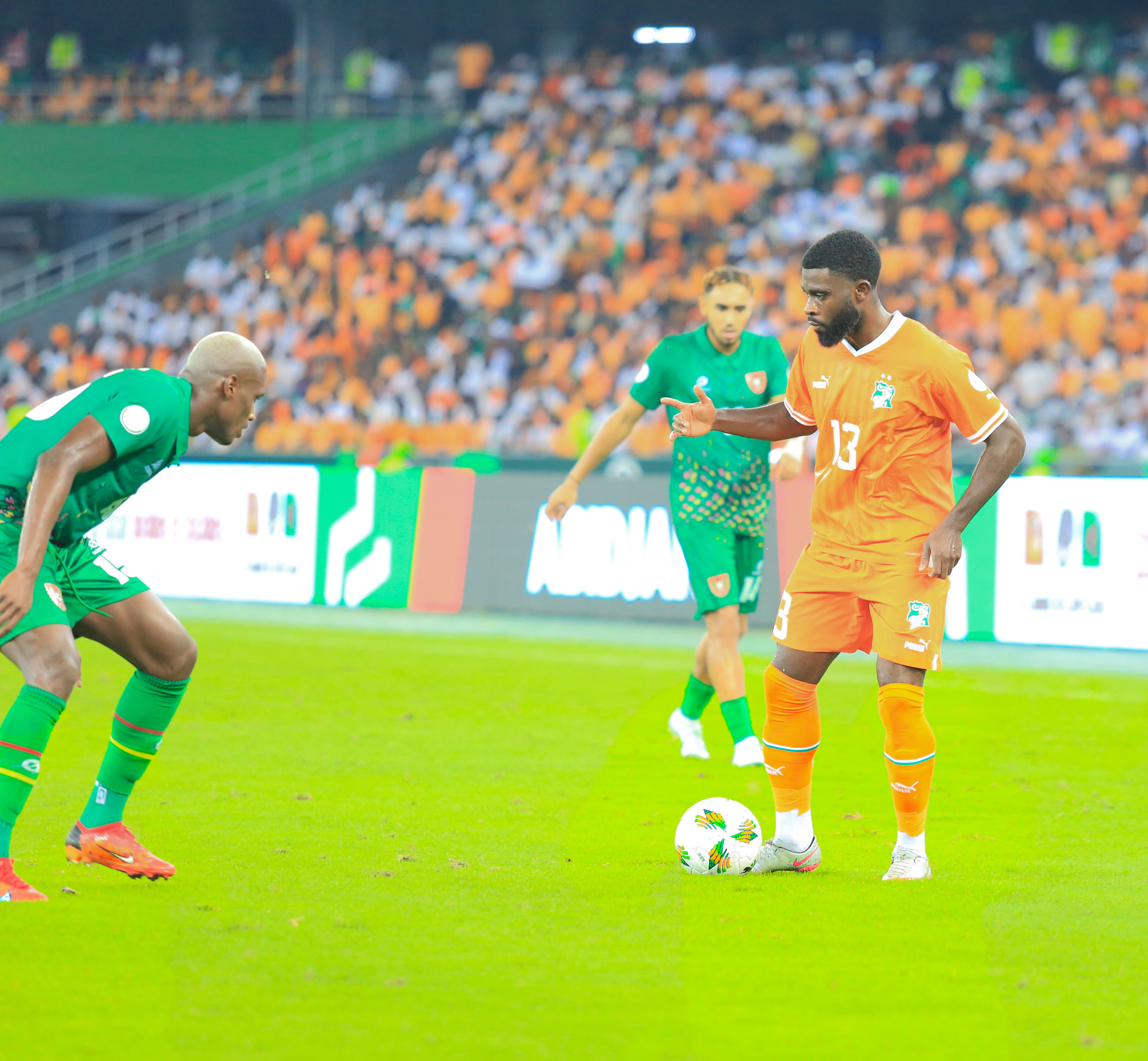
Boga with Ivory Coast in 2024

Boga participated in its first international competition for Ivory Coast at the 2021 Africa Cup of Nations in Cameroon, and were eliminated in the Round of 16 by Egypt.

On 28 December 2023, he was selected from the list of 27 Ivorian players selected by Jean-Louis Gasset to compete in the 2023 Africa Cup of Nations.

== Personal life ==
Boga was born in Marseille, France, to Ivorian parents.

== Career statistics ==
=== Club ===
As of match played 1 November 2026

Appearances and goals by club, season and competition
Club	Season	League			National cup (Note: Includes Coupe de France, Copa del Rey, FA Cup, Coppa Italia)		League cup (Note: Includes Coupe de la Ligue)		Europe		Total	
Club	Season	Division	Apps	Goals	Apps	Goals	Apps	Goals	Apps	Goals	Apps	Goals
Chelsea	2014–15	Premier League	0	0	0	0	0	0	0	0	0	0
Chelsea	2017–18	Premier League	1	0	—		—		—		1	0
Chelsea	Total		1	0	0	0	0	0	0	0	1	0
Rennes (loan)	2015–16	Ligue 1	27	2	2	1	2	0	—		31	3
Granada (loan)	2016–17	La Liga	26	2	1	0	—		—		27	2
Birmingham City (loan)	2017–18	Championship	31	2	3	0	—		—		34	2
Sassuolo	2018–19	Serie A	25	3	2	0	—		—		27	3
Sassuolo	2019–20	Serie A	34	11	1	0	—		—		35	11
Sassuolo	2020–21	Serie A	27	4	1	0	—		—		28	4
Sassuolo	2021–22	Serie A	12	0	0	0	—		—		12	0
Sassuolo	Total		99	18	4	0	—		—		103	18
Atalanta (loan)	2021–22	Serie A	15	0	1	1	—		6 (Note: Appearances in UEFA Europa League)	1	22	2
Atalanta	2022–23	Serie A	23	2	2	0	—		—		25	2
Atalanta	Atalanta total		38	2	3	1	—		6	1	47	4
Nice	2023–24	Ligue 1	28	6	1	0	—		—		29	6
Nice	2024–25	Ligue 1	21	1	0	0	—		3	1	24	2
Nice	2025–26	Ligue 1	14	2	0	0	—		6 (Note: Two appearances in UEFA Champions League, four appearances in UEFA Europa League)	0	20	2
Nice	Total		63	9	1	0	—		9	1	73	10
Juventus (loan)	2025–26	Serie A	15	4	1	0	—		1 (Note: Appearance in UEFA Champions League)	0	17	4
Juventus	2026–27	Serie A	7	1	0	0	—		1	0	8	1
Juventus	Total		22	5	1	0	—		2	0	25	5
Career total			308	43	15	2	2	0	17	2	340	47

=== International ===
As of match played 10 June 2025

Appearances and goals by national team and year
National team	Year	Apps	Goals
Ivory Coast	2017	1	0
Ivory Coast	2021	6	1
Ivory Coast	2022	3	0
Ivory Coast	2023	4	0
Ivory Coast	2024	9	1
Ivory Coast	2025	2	0
Total		25	2

Scores and results list Ivory Coast's goal tally first.

List of international goals scored by Jérémie Boga
No.	Date	Venue	Opponent	Score	Result	Competition
1	8 October 2021	Orlando Stadium, Johannesburg, South Africa	Malawi	3–0	3–0	2022 FIFA World Cup qualification
2	6 January 2024	Laurent Pokou Stadium, San-Pédro, Ivory Coast	Sierra Leone	4–0	5–1	Friendly

== Honours ==
Chelsea Youth

- FA Youth Cup: 2013–14, 2014–15
- Professional U21 Development League: 2013–14
- UEFA Youth League: 2014–15

Ivory Coast

- Africa Cup of Nations: 2023

Individual

- Serie A Player of the Month: March 2026
