= Simone Franchini =

Italian football player

Personal information
- Date of birth: 30 March 1998 (age 28)
- Place of birth: Modena, Italy
- Height: 1.83 m (6 ft 0 in)
- Position: Midfielder

Team information
- Current team: Reggina
- Number: 80

Youth career
- 2014–2018: Sassuolo

Senior career*
| Years | Team | Apps | (Gls) |
| 2016–2019 | Sassuolo | 0 | (0) |
| 2017–2018 | → Ternana (loan) | 0 | (0) |
| 2018–2019 | → Reggina (loan) | 31 | (1) |
| 2019–2020 | Cesena | 13 | (0) |
| 2020 | Piacenza | 3 | (0) |
| 2020–2024 | Padova | 35 | (0) |
| 2020–2021 | → Ravenna (loan) | 25 | (2) |
| 2021–2022 | → Monterosi (loan) | 29 | (2) |
| 2023–2024 | → Pescara (loan) | 16 | (2) |
| 2024 | Pescara | 0 | (0) |
| 2024–2025 | Gubbio | 11 | (0) |
| 2025–2026 | Guidonia | 25 | (0) |
| 2026– | Reggina | 0 | (0) |
- * Club domestic league appearances and goals as of 28 July 2026

Simone Franchini (born 30 March 1998) is an Italian football player who plays as a midfielder for Serie D Group I club Reggina.

== Club career ==
=== Sassuolo ===
He is the product of Sassuolo youth teams. He made his debut for Sassuolo's senior team on 3 November 2016 in a 2016–17 UEFA Europa League group stage game against Rapid Wien as an added-time substitute for Grégoire Defrel. He made his first bench appearance in a league game in the 2016–17 Serie A match against Inter on 18 December 2016, and appeared on the bench a handful more times in Serie A and Europa League, but did not see any more playing time for the rest of the season.

==== Loan to Ternana ====
On 12 July 2017, he was sent on loan to Serie B club Ternana. He remained on the bench for every Ternana's game, and was eventually recalled to Sassuolo in January 2018. He finished the 2017–18 season in their Under-19 team.

==== Loan to Reggina ====
On 6 July 2018, he joined Serie C club Reggina on loan. He made his Serie C debut for Reggina on 18 September 2018 in a game against Trapani as a 71st-minute substitute for Gaetano Navas. He started in the next game against Bisceglie and scored his first goal on 15 October 2018 against Siracusa.

=== Cesena ===
On 12 July 2019, he signed a 3-year contract with Cesena.

=== Piacenza ===
On 16 January 2020 he moved to Piacenza.

=== Padova ===
On 10 September 2020, he signed a 2-year contract with Padova and was immediately loaned to Ravenna for the 2020–21 season.

On 8 August 2021, he was loaned Serie C club Monterosi.

On 1 September 2023, Franchini moved to Pescara on loan with an obligation to buy.

On 22 August 2024, Franchini moved to Gubbio on permanent basis.
