= Simone Caputo =

Italian professional footballer

Personal information
- Date of birth: 25 July 1998 (age 28)
- Place of birth: Munich, Germany
- Height: 1.80 m (5 ft 11 in)
- Position: Forward

Team information
- Current team: AC Fiorano

Youth career
- 2014–2016: Sassuolo Primavera

Senior career*
Years	Team	Apps	(Gls)
2016–2018	Sassuolo	0	(0)
2017–2018	→ Latina (loan)	6	(1)
2018–	AC Fiorano		
- * Club domestic league appearances and goals as of 1 December 2017

Simone Caputo (born 25 July 1998) is an Italian professional footballer who plays as a forward for AC Fiorano in Eccellenza.

== Club career ==
Caputo is a youth exponent from Sassuolo. He made his UEFA Europa League debut on 29 September 2016 against Genk. He replaced Federico Ricci after 79 minutes.

On 17 August 2018, he joined fifth-tier club AC Fiorano.
