= Federico Ricci (footballer) =

Italian footballer (born 1994)

Personal information
- Date of birth: 27 May 1994 (age 32)
- Place of birth: Rome, Italy
- Height: 1.75 m (5 ft 9 in)
- Position: Winger

Team information
- Current team: Sorrento
- Number: 10

Youth career
- Roma

Senior career*
Years	Team	Apps	(Gls)
2013–2017	Roma	4	(0)
2014–2016	→ Crotone (loan)	57	(12)
2016–2017	→ Sassuolo (loan)	24	(2)
2017–2021	Sassuolo	1	(0)
2017	→ Genoa (loan)	5	(0)
2018	→ Crotone (loan)	15	(1)
2018–2019	→ Benevento (loan)	26	(2)
2019–2020	→ Spezia (loan)	26	(3)
2021	→ Monza (loan)	11	(0)
2021–2023	Reggina	26	(0)
2022	→ Ascoli (loan)	16	(1)
2023–2025	Perugia	36	(4)
2025–2026	Crotone	15	(2)
2026–	Sorrento	17	(2)

International career
2016–2017	Italy U21	10	(0)
- * Club domestic league appearances and goals as of 1 May 2026

Federico Ricci (born 27 May 1994) is an Italian professional footballer who plays as a winger for Serie C Group C club Sorrento. He is the twin brother of fellow footballer Matteo Ricci.

== Club career ==
=== Roma ===
Ricci is a product of Roma youth academy. He was promoted to the first squad for the 2013–14 season. He made his Serie A debut on 1 December 2013, coming off the bench and helping the team come back from down 1–0 to draw away at Atalanta. Ricci made his first start for Roma in the 1–0 defeat against Genoa on 18 May 2014. Ricci played four games for Roma during the season.

==== Crotone (loan) ====
In July 2014, Ricci signed for Serie B side Crotone on loan until the end of the 2014–15 season. Ricci made his debut in the 3–4 penalties Coppa Italia defeat to Casertana on 17 August 2014, after the match finished 0–0. On 9 July 2015, the loan was extended. During the 2015–16 season, Ricci scored 11 league goals, helping Crotone gain promotion to the Serie A for the first time in their history.

==== Sassuolo (loan) ====
On 31 August 2016, Ricci was signed by Serie A club Sassuolo, on a temporary deal for €500,000, with an option to buy. He made his European debut for Sassuolo in UEFA Europa League, playing all six group stage matches.

=== Sassuolo ===
On 30 June 2017, Ricci was signed by Sassuolo outright for €3 million fee. On the same day another Roma youth product Lorenzo Pellegrini was bought back by Roma from Sassuolo, for €10 million fee.

==== Genoa (loan) ====
On 31 August 2017, Ricci joined Genoa on a season-long loan from Sassuolo, with an option to buy.

==== Crotone (loan) ====
In January 2018, Ricci returned to Serie A side Crotone on loan until the end of the 2017–18 season.

==== Benevento (loan) ====
On 2 August 2018, Ricci joined Serie B side Benevento on loan until 30 June 2019.

==== Spezia (loan) ====
On 15 July 2019, he joined Serie B club Spezia on loan. Ricci played 29 games in all competitions, scoring four goals – he helped Spezia gain promotion to the Serie A for the first time in their history.

==== Monza (loan) ====
On 12 January 2020, Ricci moved to Serie B club Monza on a six-month loan. He made his debut on 31 January, as a substitute against SPAL in a 1–1 league draw.

=== Reggina ===
On 13 July 2021, he signed a three-year contract with Reggina.

==== Ascoli (loan) ====
On 31 January 2022, Ricci was loaned to Ascoli with an option to buy.

=== Perugia ===
On 4 September 2023, Ricci joined Perugia on a two-year deal.

== International career ==
On 4 February 2016, Federico Ricci received his first U21 call-up. On 24 March 2016, Ricci made his debut with Italy's U21 team, in a 4–1 victory against Ireland.

== Career statistics ==
=== Club ===
As of match played 10 May 2021

Club	Season	League			National Cup (Note: Includes Coppa Italia)		Continental		Other		Total	
Club	Season	Division	Apps	Goals	Apps	Goals	Apps	Goals	Apps	Goals	Apps	Goals
Roma	2012–13	Serie A	—		0	0	—		—		0	0
Roma	2013–14	Serie A	4	0	0	0	—		—		4	0
Roma	2016–17	Serie A	0	0	—		—		—		0	0
Roma	Total		4	0	0	0	0	0	0	0	4	0
Crotone (loan)	2014–15	Serie B	21	1	1	0	—		—		22	1
Crotone (loan)	2015–16	Serie B	36	11	2	0	—		—		38	11
Crotone (loan)	Total		57	12	3	0	0	0	0	0	60	12
Sassuolo (loan)	2016–17	Serie A	24	2	1	0	6 (Note: Appearance(s) in the UEFA Europa League)	0	—		31	2
Sassuolo	2017–18	Serie A	0	0	0	0	—		—		0	0
Sassuolo	2020–21	Serie A	1	0	—		—		—		1	0
Sassuolo	Total		25	2	1	0	6	0	0	0	32	2
Genoa (loan)	2017–18	Serie A	5	0	2	0	—		—		7	0
Crotone (loan)	2017–18	Serie A	15	1	0	0	—		—		15	1
Benevento (loan)	2018–19	Serie B	26	2	4	0	—		2 (Note: Appearance(s) in Serie B promotion play-offs)	0	32	2
Spezia (loan)	2019–20	Serie B	26	3	2	1	—		1	0	29	4
Monza (loan)	2020–21	Serie B	11	0	—		—		—		11	0
Career total			169	20	12	1	6	0	3	0	190	21
