= Lorenzo Pellegrini =

Italian footballer (born 1996)

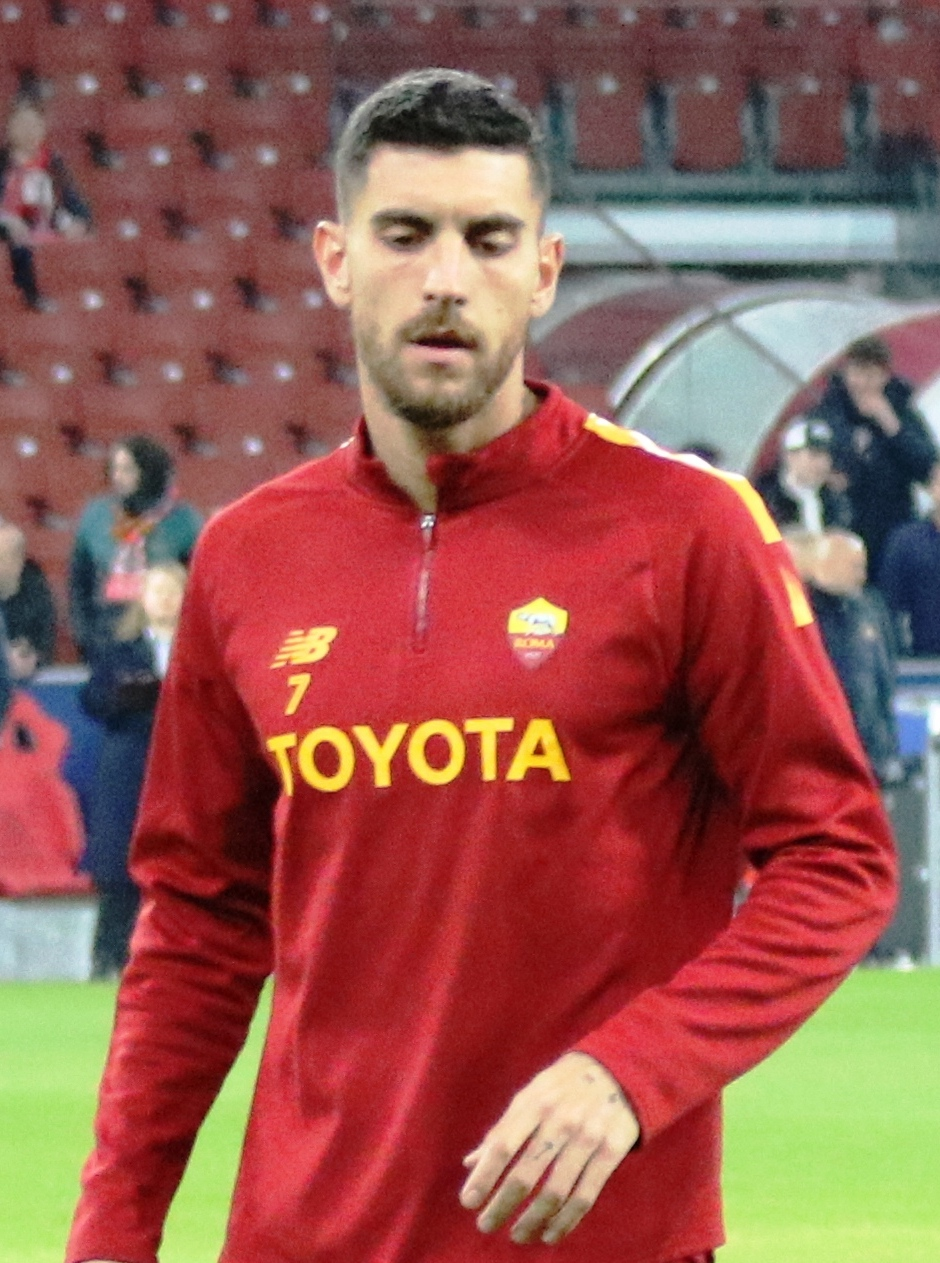
- Pellegrini warming up for Roma in 2023

Personal information
- Full name: Lorenzo Pellegrini
- Date of birth: 19 June 1996 (age 30)
- Place of birth: Rome, Italy
- Height: 1.86 m (6 ft 1 in)
- Position: Attacking midfielder

Team information
- Current team: Roma
- Number: 7

Youth career
- 2007–2015: Roma

Senior career*
Years	Team	Apps	(Gls)
2014–2015	Roma	1	(0)
2015–2017	Sassuolo	47	(9)
2017–	Roma	252	(40)

International career^{‡}
2014–2015	Italy U19	15	(1)
2015	Italy U20	2	(0)
2016–2019	Italy U21	14	(5)
2017–	Italy	36	(6)
Medal record
Men's Football
Representing Italy
UEFA Nations League
Third place	2021 Italy
Third place	2023 Netherlands
CONMEBOL–UEFA Cup of Champions
Runner-up	2022 England
- * Club domestic league appearances and goals as of 23:29, 10 April 2026 (UTC) ‡ National team caps and goals as of 10 October 2024

Lorenzo Pellegrini (Italian pronunciation: [loˈrɛntso pelleˈɡriːni]; born 19 June 1996) is an Italian professional footballer who plays as an attacking midfielder for Serie A club Roma and the Italy national team.

Pellegrini is an academy graduate of Roma, having joined the club in 2007, and made his senior debut in 2015. He departed for Sassuolo later that year, where he made over fifty appearances across all competitions, before returning to Roma in July 2017.

== Club career ==
=== Roma ===
Born in Rome, Pellegrini, who had suffered from arrhythmia as a youngster, joined the youth academy of local side Roma at the age of nine. Having previously represented the club in the UEFA Youth League, he was handed his senior debut at the age of 18 by manager Rudi Garcia on 22 March 2015, coming on as a second-half substitute for Salih Uçan in a 1–0 Serie A victory against Cesena.

=== Sassuolo ===
On 30 June 2015, Pellegrini signed for fellow Serie A side Sassuolo for a fee of €1.25 million. In terms of the transfer agreement, Roma retained a buy-back-clause which afforded the club the opportunity to re-purchase Pellegrini at a future stage. Pellegrini made his debut for the club on 8 November 2015, starting in a 1–0 league victory against Carpi, and scored his first goal the following month when he netted in a 3–0 victory against Sampdoria. He eventually made 20 appearances for the season, including one in the Coppa Italia, and scored three goals. During the 2016–17 season, Pellegrini became the youngest player to have a hand in ten goals in one Serie A campaign, having registered six goals and four assists by 10 April 2017. He made 34 appearances across all competitions for the campaign, scoring eight goals registering seven assists, before re-signing for Roma at the end of the season.

=== Return to Roma ===
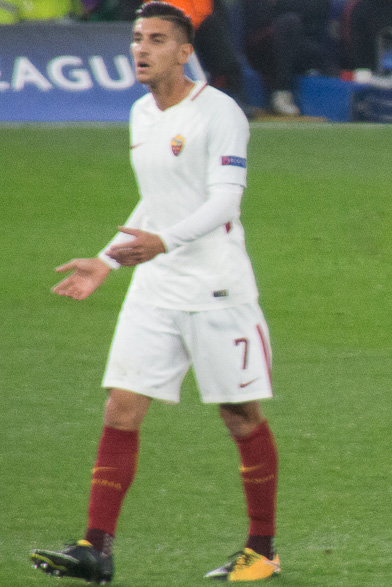
Pellegrini playing for A.S. Roma in 2017.

On 30 June 2017, Roma exercised the buyback clause of €10 million, which was included in Pellegrini's transfer agreement with Sassuolo, to bring him back to Rome on a five-year deal. On the same day Roma youth product Federico Ricci joined Sassuolo outright, for a €3 million fee. Pellegrini scored his first-ever goal for the club on 1 December 2017, netting Roma's third goal in a 3–1 league victory against SPAL.

On 25 May 2022, Pellegrini captained A.S. Roma in the inaugural Europa Conference League final, which his team won 1–0 against Feyenoord. He was also named Player of the Season in that competition. On 31 May 2023, he captained his team in the Europa League final which they lost 4–1 on penalties against Sevilla following a 1–1 draw after extra time. On 8 August, 2026, Pellegrini extended his contract with Roma until June 2027.

== International career ==
Having represented various Italian youth teams, Pellegrini debuted for the senior squad on 11 June 2017 in a 5–0 home victory against Liechtenstein of a 2018 World Cup qualification. Later that month, Pellegrini was included in the Italy under-21 squad for the 2017 UEFA European Under-21 Championship by manager Luigi Di Biagio. One 18 June, he scored his first youth goal at the tournament, netting from a bicycle kick in a 2–0 victory against Denmark. Italy was eliminated in the semi-finals after a 3–1 defeat against Spain on 27 June. During the match, Pellegrini assisted Federico Bernardeschi's temporary equaliser. Two years after his promotion in the senior team, Pellegrini was called back in the U21 squad for the 2019 UEFA European Under-21 Championship on home soil. Pellegrini scored his first goal with the Italy senior side on 5 September 2019, in a 3–1 away victory against Armenia in a Euro 2020 qualifier.

In June 2021, Pellegrini was included in Italy's squad for UEFA Euro 2020 by manager Roberto Mancini. However, an injury ruled him out of the final tournament, and Gaetano Castrovilli was called up in his place. On 6 October, Pellegrini scored in a 2–1 home defeat against Spain in the semi-finals of the 2021 UEFA Nations League Finals.

In June 2024, Pellegrini was included by manager Luciano Spalletti in Italy's squad for UEFA Euro 2024, and was later assigned the number ten shirt. In June 2024, Bastoni was included in Italy's final squad for UEFA Euro 2024 by manager Luciano Spalletti. On 15 June, in Italy's opening group match of the tournament against Albania, he set up Alessandro Bastoni's temporary equaliser as Italy came from behind to win the match 2–1. Italy was eliminated from the tournament in the round of 16 following a 2–0 loss against Switzerland.

== Style of play ==
Pellegrini's primary position is central midfielder, though he is capable of being deployed in any position in a three-man midfield, including as an attacking midfielder or defensive midfielder. A tall and physically strong midfielder, his attributes include stamina, ball control, movement, and the ability to make runs into the penalty area from deep positions, as well as the ability to strike at goal from distance with either foot, despite being naturally right-footed. Having played as a central defender earlier in his career, he is also capable in defensive situations, allowing him to win back possession before transitioning to carrying or distributing the ball and providing assists. This combination of attributes allows him to contribute across the pitch in a box-to-box role.

== Personal life ==
Pellegrini is married to Veronica Martinelli, with whom he has three children together.

== Career statistics ==
=== Club ===
As of match played 10 April 2026

Appearances and goals by club, season and competition
Club	Season	League			Coppa Italia		Europe		Total	
Club	Season	Division	Apps	Goals	Apps	Goals	Apps	Goals	Apps	Goals
Roma	2014–15	Serie A	1	0	0	0	0	0	1	0
Sassuolo	2015–16	Serie A	19	3	1	0	—		20	3
Sassuolo	2016–17	Serie A	28	6	1	1	5 (Note: Appearances in UEFA Europa League)	1	34	8
Sassuolo	Total		47	9	2	1	5	1	54	11
Roma	2017–18	Serie A	28	3	1	0	8 (Note: Appearances in UEFA Champions League)	0	37	3
Roma	2018–19	Serie A	25	2	2	0	6	1	33	3
Roma	2019–20	Serie A	27	1	2	2	5	0	34	3
Roma	2020–21	Serie A	34	7	1	1	12	3	47	11
Roma	2021–22	Serie A	28	9	1	0	12 (Note: Appearances in UEFA Europa Conference League)	5	41	14
Roma	2022–23	Serie A	32	4	2	0	14	4	48	8
Roma	2023–24	Serie A	29	8	2	0	10	2	41	10
Roma	2024–25	Serie A	25	2	2	0	7	1	34	3
Roma	2025–26	Serie A	24	4	0	0	9	3	33	7
Roma	Total		252	40	13	3	83	19	348	62
Career total			299	48	15	4	88	20	402	72

=== International ===
As of match played 10 October 2024

Appearances and goals by national team and year
National team	Year	Apps	Goals
Italy	2017	1	0
Italy	2018	8	0
Italy	2019	3	1
Italy	2020	3	1
Italy	2021	5	1
Italy	2022	4	2
Italy	2023	2	0
Italy	2024	10	1
Total		36	6

Italy score listed first, score column indicates score after each Pellegrini goal

List of international goals scored by Lorenzo Pellegrini
No.	Date	Venue	Cap	Opponent	Score	Result	Competition
1	5 September 2019	Republican Stadium, Yerevan, Armenia	11	Armenia	2–1	3–1	UEFA Euro 2020 qualification
2	14 October 2020	Stadio Atleti Azzurri d'Italia, Bergamo, Italy	15	Netherlands	1–0	1–1	2020–21 UEFA Nations League A
3	6 October 2021	San Siro, Milan, Italy	19	Spain	1–2	1–2	2021 UEFA Nations League Finals
4	4 June 2022	Stadio Renato Dall'Ara, Bologna, Italy	22	Germany	1–0	1–1	2022–23 UEFA Nations League A
5	7 June 2022	Stadio Dino Manuzzi, Cesena, Italy	23	Hungary	2–0	2–1	2022–23 UEFA Nations League A
6	24 March 2024	Red Bull Arena, Harrison, United States	28	Ecuador	1–0	2–0	Friendly

== Honours ==
Roma

- UEFA Europa Conference League: 2021–22
- UEFA Europa League runner-up: 2022–23

Italy

- UEFA Nations League third place: 2020–21, 2022–23

Individual

- AS Roma Player of the Season: 2020–21
- UEFA Europa League Team of the Season: 2020–21, 2022–23
- Serie A Goal of the Month: September 2021, January 2022, March 2022
- UEFA Europa Conference League Team of the Season: 2021–22
- UEFA Europa Conference League Player of the Season: 2021–22
- Serie A Team of the Season: 2023–24
