= Leonardo Fontanesi =

Italian footballer

Personal information
- Full name: Leonardo Fontanesi
- Date of birth: 20 February 1996 (age 30)
- Place of birth: Correggio, Italy
- Height: 1.88 m (6 ft 2 in)
- Position: Center back

Youth career
- –2015: Sassuolo

Senior career*
Years	Team	Apps	(Gls)
2015–2020	Sassuolo	3	(0)
2016	→ Cesena (loan)	7	(0)
2016–2017	→ Brescia (loan)	6	(0)
2017–2018	→ Gubbio (loan)	3	(0)
2018–2019	→ Pontedera (loan)	18	(0)

International career
2015	Italy U-21	1	(0)
- * Club domestic league appearances and goals as of 4 May 2019

Leonardo Fontanesi (born 20 February 1996) is an Italian professional footballer who plays as a centre back.

== Club career ==
Fontanesi is a youth exponent from Sassuolo. He made his Serie A debut on 2 May 2015 against Palermo. He played the first 84 minutes of a 0–0 home draw before being substituted for Cesare Natali.

He signed a five-year contract with Sassuolo on 1 July 2015. On 22 January 2016, Fontanesi was signed by A.C. Cesena on a temporary deal.

In July 2016 Fontanesi returned to Sassuolo. He was assigned number 21 shirt.

On 31 August 2016, Fontanesi was signed by Brescia on a temporary deal, with an option to buy. There, he played only six games during 2016–17 Serie B season.

On 12 July 2017, after returning to Sassuolo, he was signed by Gubbio.

On 13 July 2018, Sassuolo loaned him to Serie C club Pontedera.
