= Solimena =

Solimena is an Italian surname. Notable people with the surname include:

- Angelo Solimena (1629–1716), Italian painter, father of Francesco
- Francesco Solimena (1657–1747), Italian painter
- Orazio Solimena (1690–1789), Italian painter
