= Francesco Solimena =

Italian Baroque painter (1657–1747)

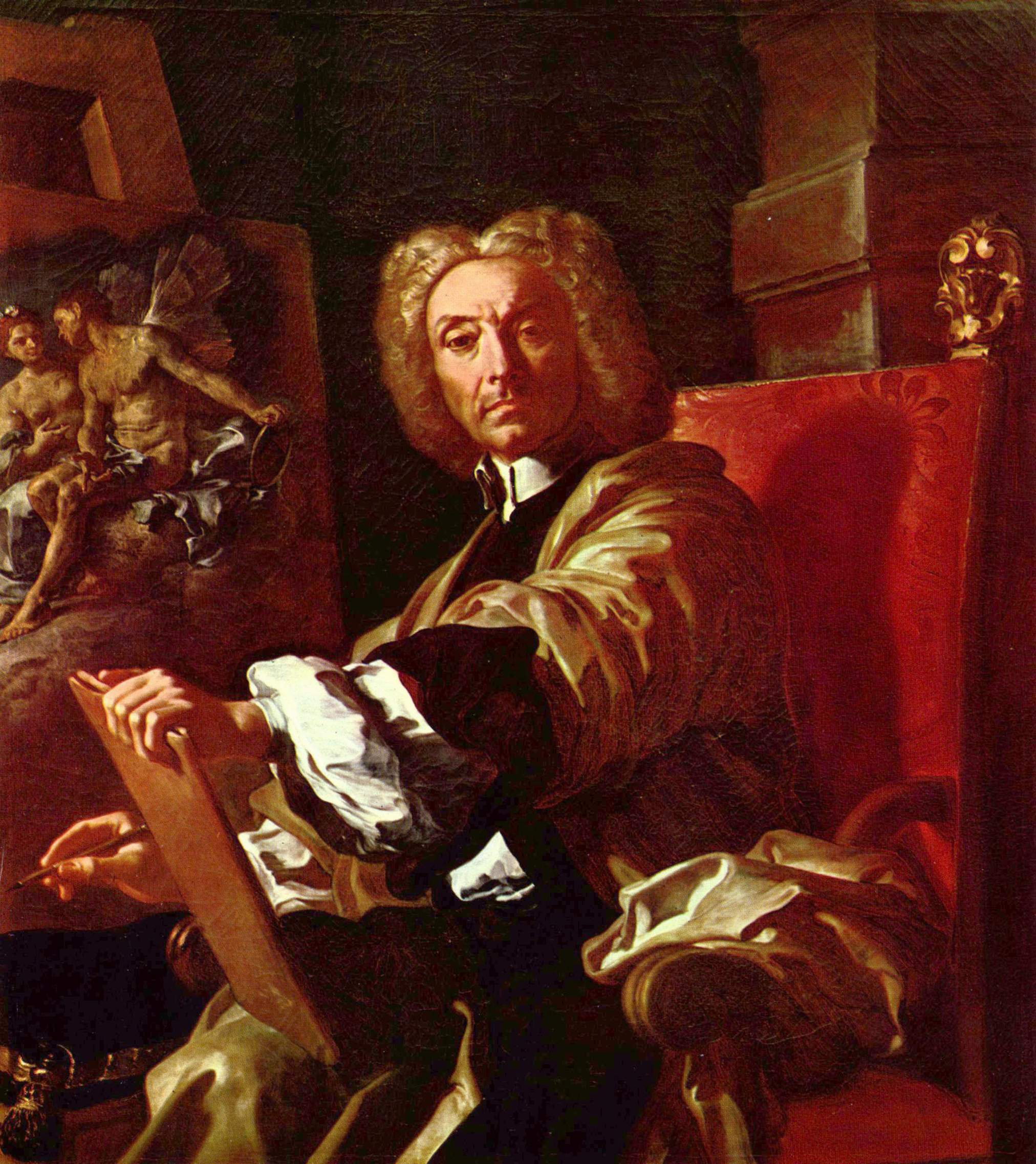
- Self-portrait, 1730, Museo di Capodimonte, Naples
- Born: 4 October 1657; Canale di Serino, province Avellino, Kingdom of Naples
- Died: 3 April 1747 (aged 89); Naples, Kingdom of Naples
- Education: Francesco di Maria
- Known for: Painting
- Movement: Baroque
- Patrons: Pope Benedict XIII

Francesco Solimena (4 October 1657 – 3 April 1747) was a prolific Italian Baroque painter, one of an established family of painters and draughtsmen. In his early years, influenced above all by Luca Giordano and Mattia Preti, he developed a highly personal and dramatic handling of light and shade, yet his later art reveals a tendency towards a more restrained classicism. Solimena had many pupils, making him one of the strongest influence in Neapolitan painting of the early 18th century.

== Biography ==
=== Training and early work, to 1690 ===
Francesco Solimena was born in Canale di Serino in the province of Avellino. He received early training from his father, Angelo Solimena, and through him absorbed a deep-seated attachment to the naturalist tradition and particularly to the art of his father's teacher, Francesco Guarino. With his father, he executed a Paradise for the cathedral of Nocera (a place where he spent a big part of his life) and a Vision of St. Cyril of Alexandria for the church of San Domenico at Solofra.

Solimena was patronized early on by Cardinal Vincenzo Orsini (later Pope Benedict XIII). Encouraged by Cardinal Orsini, he moved to Naples in 1674, and initially attended the school of Francesco di Maria in order to perfect his studies of anatomy. After enduring this brief phase of rigid academic discipline, he began to study the most important Neapolitan works of the mid-17th century, particularly the fully fledged Baroque art of Giordano and Preti. Rejecting the classicism of his contemporaries, he based his art on effects of light.

Bernardo de' Dominici, who was a friend of Solimena, described four paintings, Judith and Holofernes, the Conversion of Saul, the Sacrifice of Isaac and Lot and his Daughters (Museo de Arte de Ponce), as Solimena's earliest works and commented that, heavily influenced by the art of Solimena's father, they displayed a 'strong…and deeply felt quality'. Between 1675 and 1680 Solimena appears to have collaborated with his father. The Vision of St. Gregory Thaumaturgus (Solofra, San Domenico), commissioned by the Orsini family, where his restrained, naturalistic colour is given new warmth by a fluent and painterly handling derived from Giordano, and the fresco of Paradise (Nocera Inferiore Cathedral), which echoes Lanfranco's later Neapolitan works, date from this period. Francesco's St. Rosalia (Naples, Pisano priv. col.) reveals, in the handling of the drapery and face, the influence of Guarino's naturalism, while the flood of radiant light is derived from Giordano's work of the period 1650–60.

Among Solimena's first commissions given him by the Neapolitan religious orders were the frescoes (1677) in the chapel of Sant'Anna al Gesù Nuovo and those in San Giorgio ai Mannesi (bozzetti in Naples, Lauro priv. col.), in which it is possible to observe how the figure of St. Anthony shows a debt to Giovanni Battista Benaschi's firm disposition of masses, while the St. Nicholas anticipates the St. Nicholas of Bari at Fiumefreddo Bruzio, Calabria. Another of these works was the painting for the chapel of the Crucifix, Santa Maria dei Miracoli, Naples, St. Ignatius, Filippo Neri, Francis and Dominic (1678–9), which de' Dominici described as having been inspired by Preti and 'exceptional in drawing and chiaroscuro'.

By the 1680s, Solimena had independent fresco commissions, and his active studio came to dominate Neapolitan painting from the 1690s through the first four decades of the 18th century. Solimena painted many frescoes in Naples, altarpieces, celebrations of weddings and courtly occasions, mythological subjects, characteristically chosen for their theatrical drama, and portraits. His settings are suggested with a few details – steps, archways, balustrades, columns – concentrating attention on figures and their draperies, caught in pools and shafts of light.

His first great work was the fresco cycle depicting legends of St. Thecla, Archelas and Susanna (1680) in San Giorgio, Salerno. Here, as in the Vision of St. Gregory Thaumaturgus, the windswept apparition of the saint in the clouds is matched by the turbulent portrayal of the nun in ecstasy, her black habit set against a luminous background. In the Three Saints Led to Martyrdom, in which the Classical warriors and magnificent architectural background echo Pietro da Cortona's Rape of the Sabines (Rome, Capitoline Museums), Solimena united naturalism more successfully with the grandeur of the Roman Baroque. In another fresco in this series, now only partially visible, a fragment of still life reveals his talent for this genre, which was said by de' Dominici to be considerable.

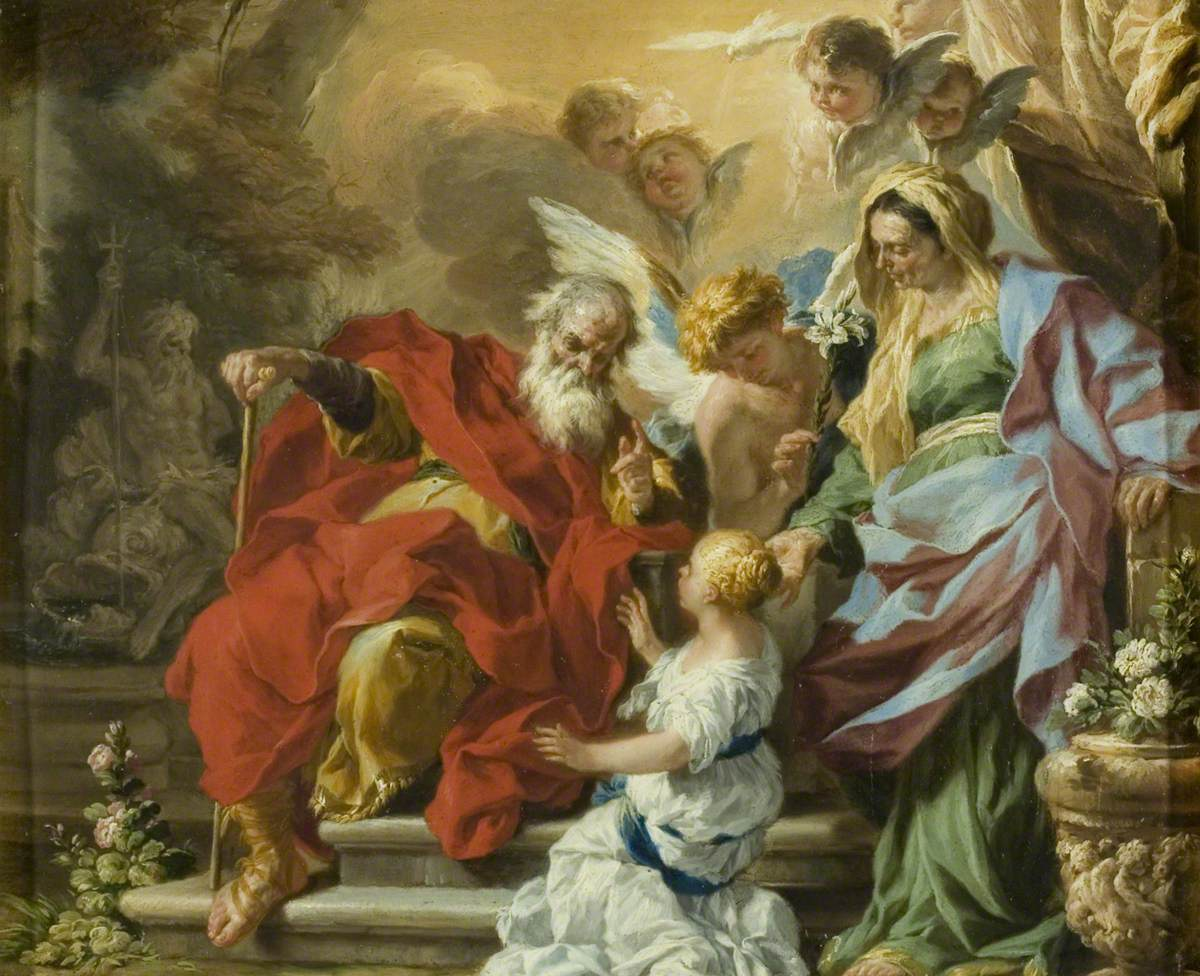
The Education of the Virgin, c. 1680

Solimena's Virgin and Child with St. Peter and Paul (Naples, San Nicola alla Carità), in which the upper part of the canvas is derived from Giovanni Lanfranco's Virgin with St. Hugo and Anselm (Afragola, Chiesa del Rosario), is similarly linked to 17th-century traditions. An increasingly powerful response to the dissolving light and tones of Giordano characterizes the Education of the Virgin (Bristol Museum & Art Gallery), the Adoration of the Magi (Houston, Sarah Campbell Blaffer Foundation) and the Virgin of the Rosary, which may date from 1680–82; the first painting remains formally linked to Angelo Solimena's works of the 1680s, such as the Coronation of St. Anne, although the result is quite different.

In 1681 Solimena began a long association with the abbey of Montecassino. The innovative composition of his altarpiece of St. Jerome, Francis of Assisi and Anthony of Padua, which he based on sweeping diagonals, was developed in the four frescoes of groups of saints (1681–4) in the choir of Santa Maria Donnaregina Nuova, Naples. In the scenes from the Life of St. Francis the flood of golden light, derived from Giordano, sets off the 'lovely harmonies of colour, characteristic of his new and more beautiful style' (de' Dominici). The cloud-borne figures, enveloped in billowing drapery, reinterpret a Baroque theme originally created by Bernini. In the Miracle of the Roses (1684) the brilliant luminosity counteracts the sense of depth created by the architecture, and the forms are bathed in a vibrant, atmospheric light. This work, painted in the same year as Giordano's Christ Driving the Money-changers from the Temple (1684; Girolamini, Naples), is Solimena's most perfect fusion of the influences of Lanfranco and Giordano.

In 1685 he painted a group of works for the Gesù delle Monache, Naples: a St. Clare, for that saint's chapel, and the Annunciation and the Marriage of the Virgin for the chapel of the Immaculate Conception. In these compositions he used increasingly dramatic chiaroscuro effects, causing him, especially in the latter work, to emphasize the foreground figures, who stand out clearly against an architectural background that is painted in steep perspective and enveloped in a murky atmosphere pierced by strong shafts of light. His Annunciation and Nativity (both 1686; Naples, Congregazione del Monte dei Poveri) perfectly unite the influences of Preti and Giordano. These works were followed by a 1687 painting for the Bishop of Nardò, the St. Francis (1688) for Santa Maria Donnaregina, Naples, the Nativity (1689; Aversa, Annunziata), with an ecstatic vision of soaring angels, and by the central vault frescoes in San Nicola alla Carità, Naples.

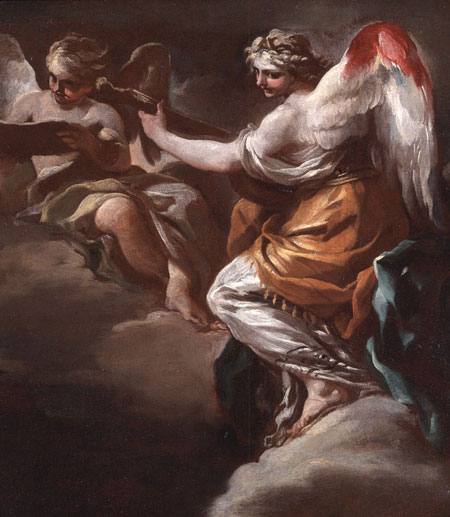
Study for the fresco cycle of the Sacristy of San Paolo Maggiore, Naples, Whitfield Fine Art

The frescoes in the sacristy of San Paolo Maggiore, Naples, where Solimena painted Virtues on the vault and side walls and two large frescoes, facing each other on the end walls, of the Conversion of Saul (1689) and the Fall of Simon Magus (1690), were the climax of his early career. They were lavishly praised by de' Dominici, who wrote of their 'beauty of colouring, nobility of aspect, perfection of ideas, diversity of physiognomy' and their 'excellent compositions, with the most beautiful contrasts'. Giordano's influence remains in the bright colours and sensuous appeal of the allegorical figures and in the brilliant ingenuity of the large figure compositions, which are, however, more academically conceived. As he moved to the second of the large frescoes Solimena began to develop the use of thicker pigments to strengthen shapes. Related to these works is the fresco recently rediscovered in the Palazzo di Vico Santa Maria Apparente, Naples, and ascribable, because of the coat of arms, to the Nifo Medici family. The theme of this fresco, formerly interpreted as Naples Freed from the Vices, is now thought to depict the Entry of Alessandro de' Medici to Florence. The Discovery of Moses (Saint Petersburg, Hermitage Museum) and the Dream of St. Joseph (Paris, Louvre) are stylistically close to this fresco and date from the same period.

=== A sombre, darker style, 1691–5 ===
After 1690 Solimena again sought inspiration in the more sombre art of Preti. This is heralded by his Miracle of St. John of God (Naples, Ospedale di Santa Maria della Pace), with dramatic contrasts of light and dark that are yet more marked in the preparatory oil sketch (New York, Paul H. Ganz priv. col.). The gloomy subject, of corpses stricken by the plague and a woman 'with a dead child on top of her, whose tender, sore-covered flesh is being eaten by a dog' (de' Dominici), is reminiscent of Preti's frescoes that were displayed over the Gates of Naples to commemorate the plague of 1656. Solimena may also have responded to changing taste, for, as Giovanni Vincenzo Gravina wrote, 'connoisseurs of painting prefer a picture painted in dark colours, which through that darkness powerfully conveys its meaning, to works which, though painted in beautiful and vivid colours, nonetheless lack expression'.

A new response to the art of Preti was of crucial importance not only for the Annunciation (The Hague, Mauritshuis) but also for the Allegory of Louis XIV (1692; Saint Petersburg, Hermitage Museum). In 1692 Giordano left Naples for Spain, where he stayed until 1702. His absence acted as a stimulus for Solimena to develop his primary role as a catalyst for painting developments, qualifying his own idiom but not abandoning the influence of Preti. His preparatory sketches (1692–3) for the dome of Santa Maria Donnalbina, Naples, executed between 1692 and 1693, refer back to Giordano's sketch (Madrid, Museo del Prado) for Santa Maria Donnaromita. In the dome Solimena painted Paradise with, below, St. Benedict's Vision of the Triumph of his Order and, in the spandrels, the Theological Virtues (1695). The sketch of St. Benedict's Vision (Genoa, priv. col.), although not the final design, fully justifies de' Dominici's statement that this was his finest work, comparable to a 'heroic poem, both for the beautiful episodes it contains, as well as for its supreme and excellent inventions'. As regards the frescoes in the spandrels, the importance of the sketches needs to be considered (two in London, Sir Brinsley Ford priv. col.; two recently on the art market). In the surviving parts of this decoration, the Virtues and the eight full-length martyr saints placed between the windows of the drum have a fullness of drapery and softness of flesh reminiscent of the frescoes in San Paolo Maggiore; other elements, such as the effects of flickering light, were more fully developed in his later work.

=== Classical and late style, 1696 and after ===
Subject paintings. In the mid-1690s Solimena, perhaps stimulated by the rivalry of Paolo de Matteis, began to move towards a more classical style, which placed greater emphasis on disegno than on colore, and revealed a new concern for ideal beauty. In these years he painted such strikingly classical works as Virgin and Child in Glory with St. Angelo and Clare of Montefalco (Naples, Santa Maria Egiziaca a Forcella) and the Assumption (1697; Marcianise, Annunziata), while at the same time he worked on frescoes of St. John the Baptist and Paul Preaching in San Nicola alla Carità, Naples. De' Dominici commented that Solimena's new manner was most clearly revealed in his St. Christopher (Naples, Sant'Anna dei Lombardi), a picture distinguished by the ideal beauty of the nude.

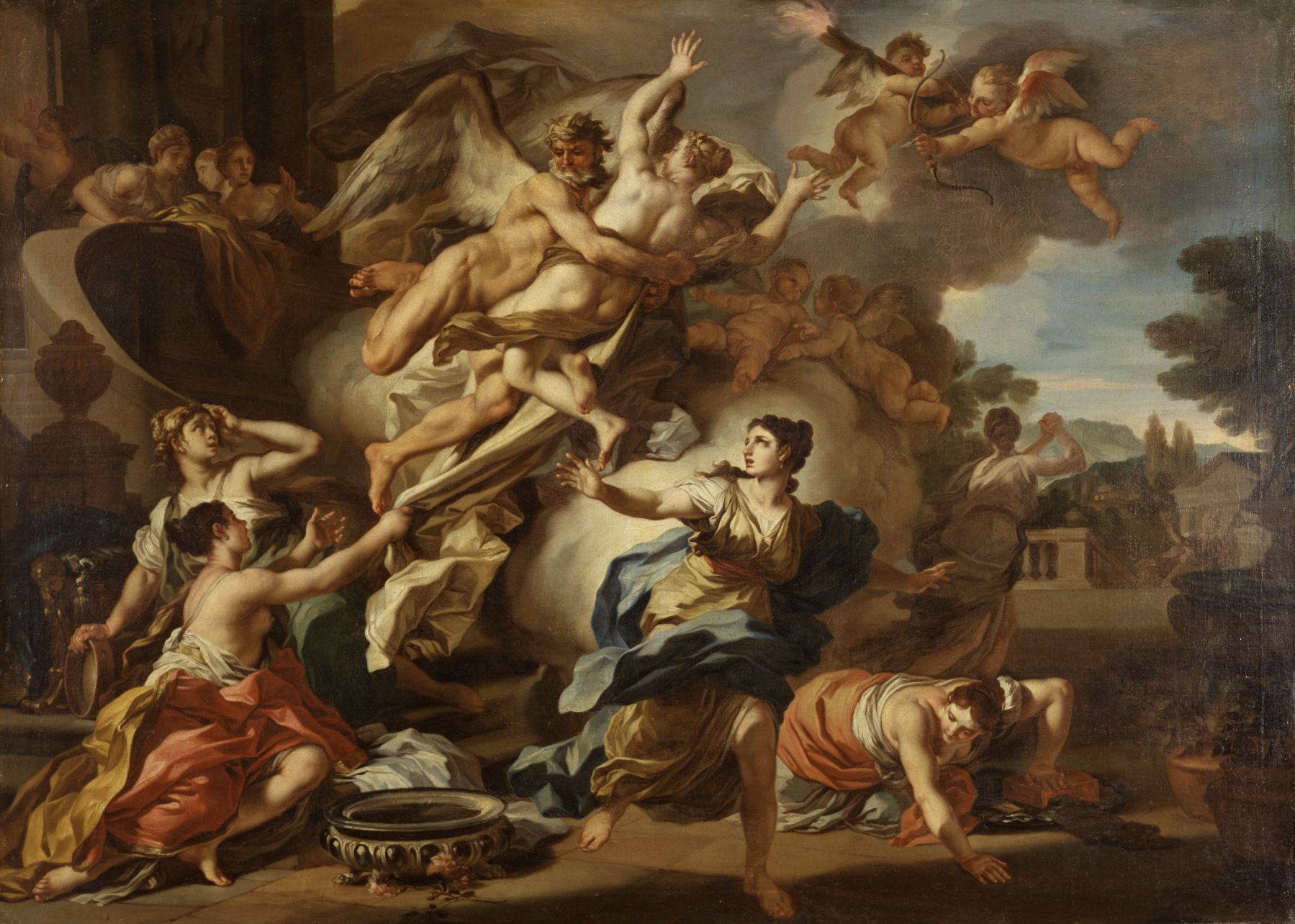
The Abduction of Orithyia, c. 1730

There followed the monumental canvases of scenes from the Life of the Virgin (1696–1701; San Lorenzo Maggiore, Naples), painted for the transept of Santa Maria Donnalbina, Naples, and reminiscent of the classicism of Carlo Maratta, for whose works he had great admiration, seeing in them 'an example of true perfection of outline' (de' Dominici). It seems probable that Solimena visited Rome in 1701. There he painted the Abduction of Orithyia (Rome, Galleria Spada) for Cardinal Fabrizio Spada, in which the clarity of drawing, the friezelike composition and the rhetorical expression and gesture show his assimilation of both Roman classicism and the classicism promulgated by the influential French Academy in Rome. It has been suggested that the discipline and clarity of Solimena's pictures perhaps reflects Cardinal Orsini's rigorous conservatism and belief in the didactic function of religious art, as expounded in the Lettere ecclesiastiche of Pompeo Sarnelli.

In the early years of the 18th century Solimena was at the height of his powers. In the canvas of Dido and Aeneas (London, National Gallery) there is a growing emphasis on the preciousness of the fabrics and the elaborate depiction of objects. This is also seen in a series of paintings for the procurator of the canals of Venice, of which Venus Receiving the Arms of Aeneas from Vulcan (1704; Malibu, J. Paul Getty Museum) was probably the first to be completed. Solimena painted both monumental and serenely classical works, which were much copied, such as St. Bonaventure Receiving the Banner of the Holy Sepulchre from the Virgin (1710; Aversa Cathedral), and in the same period works such as St. Clement, Filippo Neri, Lawrence and Lazarus (1706; Sarzana Cathedral).

While the altarpieces in Sarzana Cathedral and San Pietro Martire, Naples (1707), signal a return to dramatic chiaroscuro in the manner of Preti, between 1706 and 1707 Solimena painted the great fresco of the Triumph of Faith for the vault of the sacristy of San Domenico Maggiore, Naples. In this he found a way of drawing on his experiences at Santa Maria Donnalbina and the Nifo Medici palazzo by revising his earlier experiments with form, playing on the juxtaposition of the upper area, where he creates a more rarefied and encompassing atmosphere with solid masses of cloud, with the lower part, where the bodies are depicted as hiding and suddenly reappearing as they plummet downward. The repercussions are seen in the Virgin and Child with Saints (1710; Aversa Cathedral) and in the slightly later Assumption of the Virgin in Santa Maria del Carmine, Naples, as well as in works done for private collectors, such as the Departure of Rebecca (after 1708), painted for the Baglioni family of Venice (known through drawing no. 1168, Vienna, Albertina; replica in Ajaccio, Musée Fesch), Deborah and Barach and Judith Displaying the Head of Holofernes (Cornigliano, Villa Bombrini).

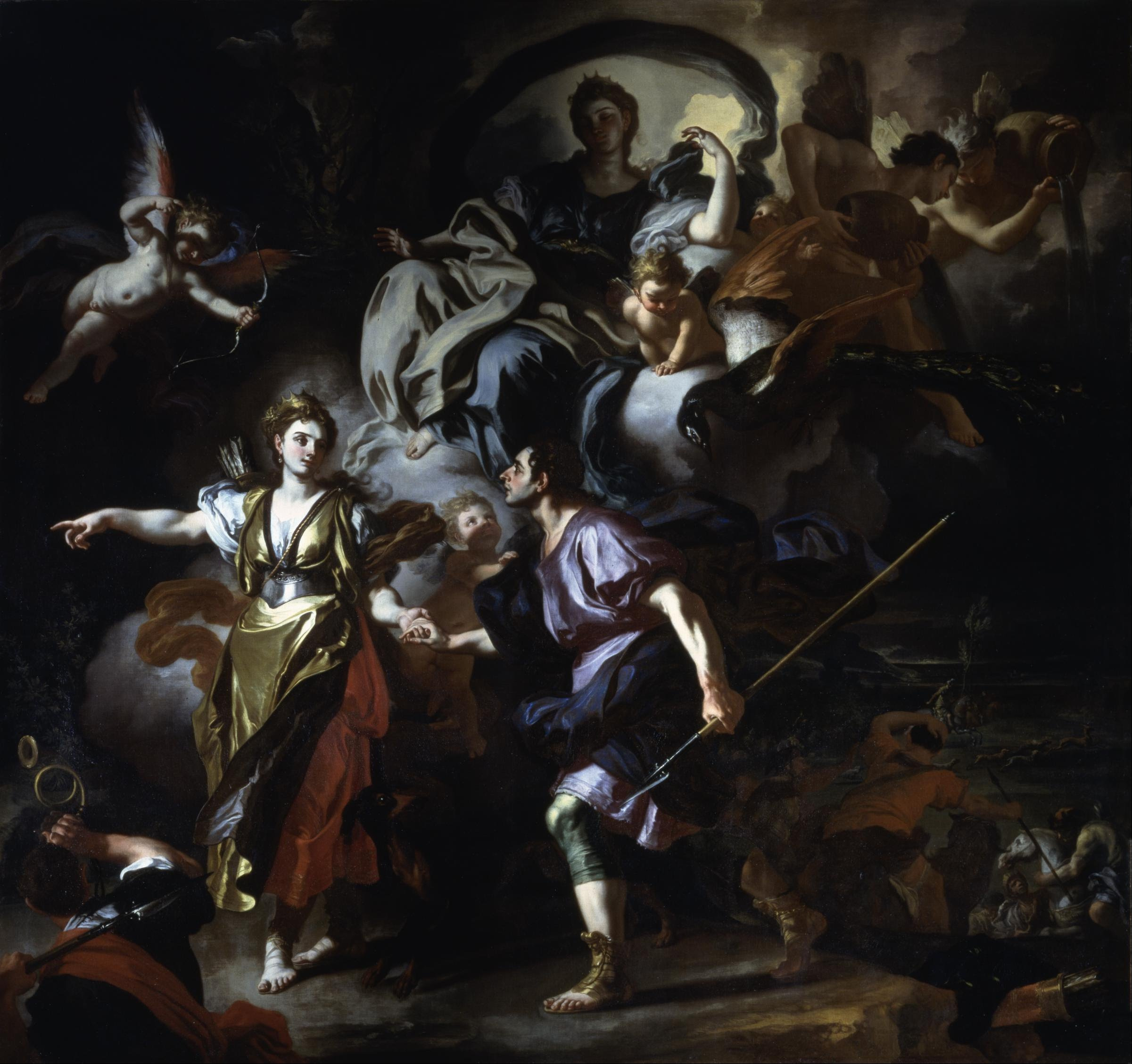
Dido Welcoming Aeneas to the Royal Hunt, c. 1712

From the second decade of the century Solimena's intention to strengthen form by means of the effects of light becomes more evident. It is particularly visible in Diana and Endymion (Liverpool Museum), Christ Appearing to the Virgin (Cleveland Museum of Art) and the Dido and Aeneas executed for the Palazzo Buonaccorsi, Macerata (preparatory sketch, Opočno, near Náchod, Castle). Solimena's style was popular in the courts of Europe as well as among the Italian nobility. In 1714 Raimondo Buonaccorsi commissioned him to contribute Dido Welcoming Aeneas to the Royal Hunt (Macerata, Palazzo Buonaccorsi) to a series of pictures illustrating episodes from the Aeneid. This intensely romantic picture, in which the thundery light is again reminiscent of Preti, was widely acclaimed; Giovanni Gioseffo dal Sole travelled to Macerata to see it when he was invited to contribute to the same series.

This was followed by the three paintings commissioned by the Giustiniani family in 1710 for the Senate Room in Genoa, for which Solimena was paid over 6000 ducats. The first painting completed was the Massacre of the Giustiniani at Scio (known from a sketch, Naples, Museo di Capodimonte). In its vertical development it demonstrates the artist's attempt to subordinate the figures to the architectural structure: a drawing of its central area (Naples, Società di Storia Patria) shows this in detail. The Arrival of St. John the Baptist's Ashes in Genoa reached Genoa in August 1717. The third work, Columbus Landing in the Indies, was completed 12 years later, as has recently been documented, confirming statements made by de' Dominici. A global vision of the latter work (partial sketch, Museum of Fine Arts of Rennes) is provided in a drawing (New York, Cooper Hewitt, Smithsonian Design Museum).

Between 1723 and 1724 Solimena painted four biblical scenes for Victor Amadeus II (Turin, Galleria Sabauda). In 1725 Solimena's vast fresco of the Expulsion of Heliodorus from the Temple seemed, to the Neapolitan art world, a proclamation of the artist's allegiance to the principles of classical art. It is a work of theatrical splendour, where, against a magnificent architectural setting, the figures, with their elaborately studied and carefully balanced poses and gestures, are arranged in zones parallel to the picture plane. The work was not well received; even de' Dominici thought that it lacked unity and that the figures 'lack the expression necessary for the action'.

The conservative and academic aspects of Solimena's art continue in the frescoes in the chapel of San Filippo Neri (1726–9; Girolamini, Naples), in the Deposition (1730; Vienna, Kunsthistorisches Museum) and the Annunciation (1733; Vienna, San Rocco) and culminate in Several Paths to Glory (Paris, priv. col.). The latter is the most perfect example of his compositions based on clear, primary colours and careful drawing that look forward to the art of Francesco de Mura. Yet in the same period there are the first signs of a new direction in Solimena's art: the sketch of Christ Appearing in a Dream to St. Martin (Raleigh, North Carolina Museum of Art), the altarpiece for San Gaudioso, Naples (1733), and the St. Filippo Neri in Glory (San Filippo Neri, Turin) all reveal a renewed interest in the tenebrism of Preti. Charles III, the Bourbon ruler of Naples from 1734 and later also King of Spain, became an enthusiastic patron of Solimena, commissioning the Battle of Alexander and Darius (1735–6; Madrid, El Escorial, Monastery of San Lorenzo) for the Real Sitio de San Ildefonso, for which several sketches survive (e.g. Zurich, priv. col.).

In 1737 Solimena began to work on decorations for the Royal Palace of Naples. To celebrate Charles's marriage to Maria Amalia of Saxony, he frescoed the ceiling of the royal bedroom with an Allegory of the Conjugal Virtues, in which the free and patchy handling of the colour is close to that in the Battle of Alexander and Darius. For the ceiling of the study attached to the King's Chamber he painted, on canvas, the Four Parts of the World (Bloomington, Eskenazi Museum of Art), in which he returned to earlier motifs yet gave them new life through colour expressed 'with admirable frankness of the brush' (de' Dominici). The Assumption of the Virgin (Norfolk, Chrysler Museum of Art) and Dido and Aeneas (Naples, Museo di Capodimonte) are painted in a similar technique. Coriolanus (Florence, Uffizi), Lucretia and Cleopatra (Florence, Fondazione Longhi) and Brutus and Portia (Naples, Museo di Capodimonte) are in a similar style to the Dido and Aeneas.

The Trinity with Saints (1741) was commissioned by Elisabeth Farnese, Queen of Spain, for the royal chapel of San Ildefonso at La Granja. In this work Solimena, whose style may have been affected by his failing eyesight, rejected academic purism and returned to a brilliantly free handling of colour, laid on in bold areas, penetrated by vivid flashes of light and freed from the restrictions of line.

=== Portraits ===
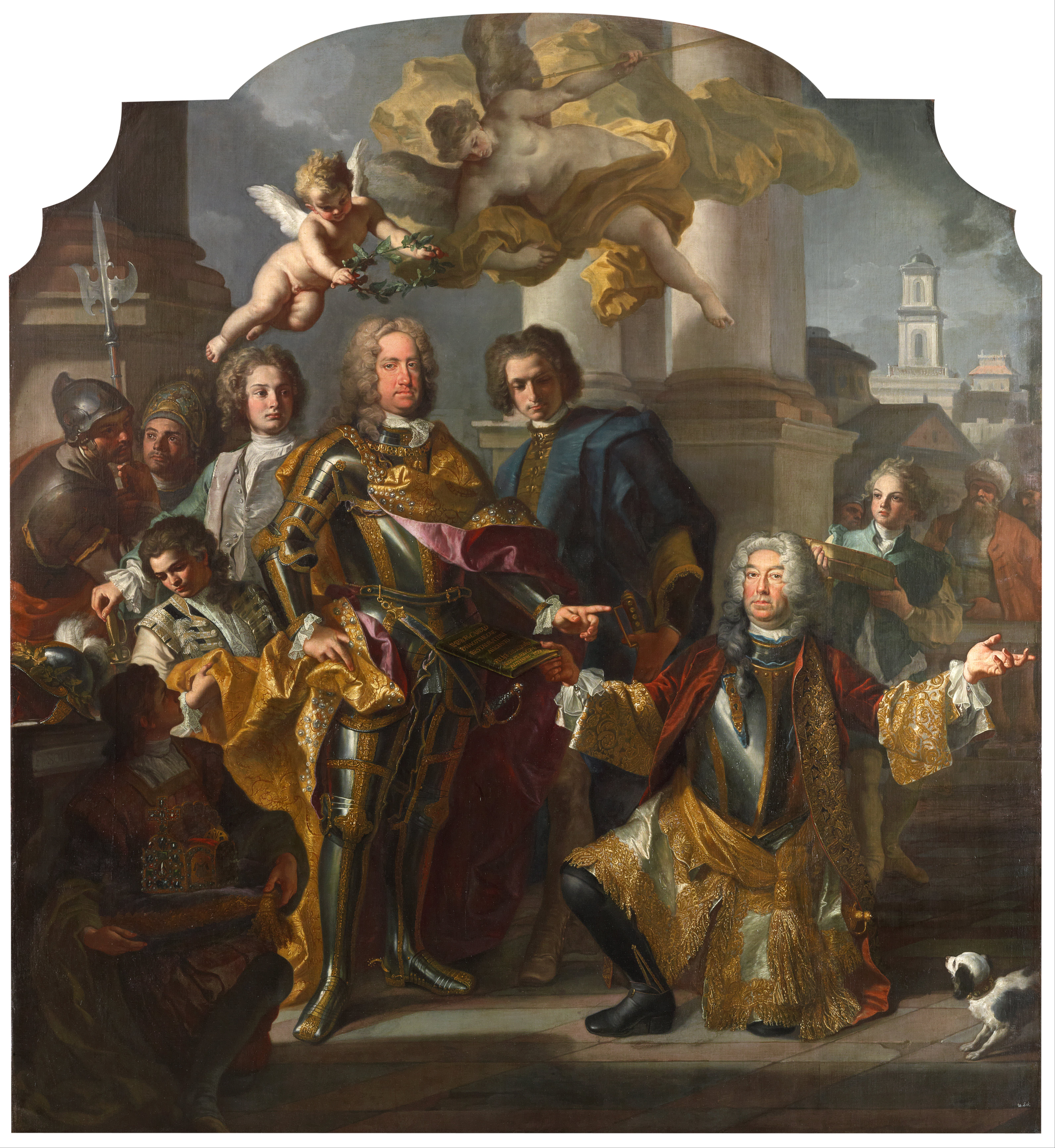
Homage of the Count Althann to Emperor Charles VI, 1728

Solimena was highly esteemed as a portrait painter of the nobility. A fine, slightly earlier example of his courtly, celebratory style is Homage of the Count Althann to Emperor Charles VI (1728). However, most of his portraits date from after 1730. In his portrait of Domenico Marzio Carafa, Duca di Maddaloni (c. 1741), the Duca is shown with the insignia of a Knight of Saint Januarius, an Order to which he was admitted in 1739. Solimena's sharp perception of character, as for example in the Portrait of a Gentleman (c. 1731; Norfolk, Chrysler Museum of Art), looked forward to Gaspare Traversi's more penetrating analyses of fashionable bourgeois sitters, but the dominant feature of Solimena's portraits is his emphasis on rank, conveyed through the richly decorative settings and ceremonious robes. The portrait of the so-called Imperial Princess of Lusciano (1746; Naples, Pisani priv. col.) is distinguished both by the dignity and splendour of the sitter and by the rich colour heightened by effects of light; it is a brilliant example of Solimena's use of colour in the final phase of his development.

=== Later life ===
Francesco Solimena amassed a fortune and lived in sumptuous style founded on his success. He died at Barra, near Naples, in 1747 at the age of 89. As Solimena had intended it, his nephew Orazio became his pupil and successor as a painter.

== School ==
His large, efficiently structured atelier became a virtual academy, at the heart of cultural life in Naples. Among his many pupils were Giuseppe Bonito (1707–89), Domenico Antonio Vaccaro (1678–1745), Nicola Maria Rossi, Lorenzo De Caro, Andrea dell'Asta, Pietro Capelli, Domenico Mondo, Onofrio Avellino, Scipione Cappella, Giovanni della Camera, Francesco Campora, Alessandro Guglielmi, Leonardo Oliviero, Salvatore Olivieri, Salvatore Pace, Romualdo Polverino, Paolo Gamba, Bernardino Fera, Evangelista Schiano, Gaspare Traversi, Santolo Cirillo, Michele Foschini, Tommaso Martini, Ferrante Amendola, Eugenio Vegliante, and most notably Corrado Giaquinto, Francesco De Mura and Sebastiano Conca. The Scottish portraitist Allan Ramsay spent three years in Solimena's studio.

Francesco Solimena

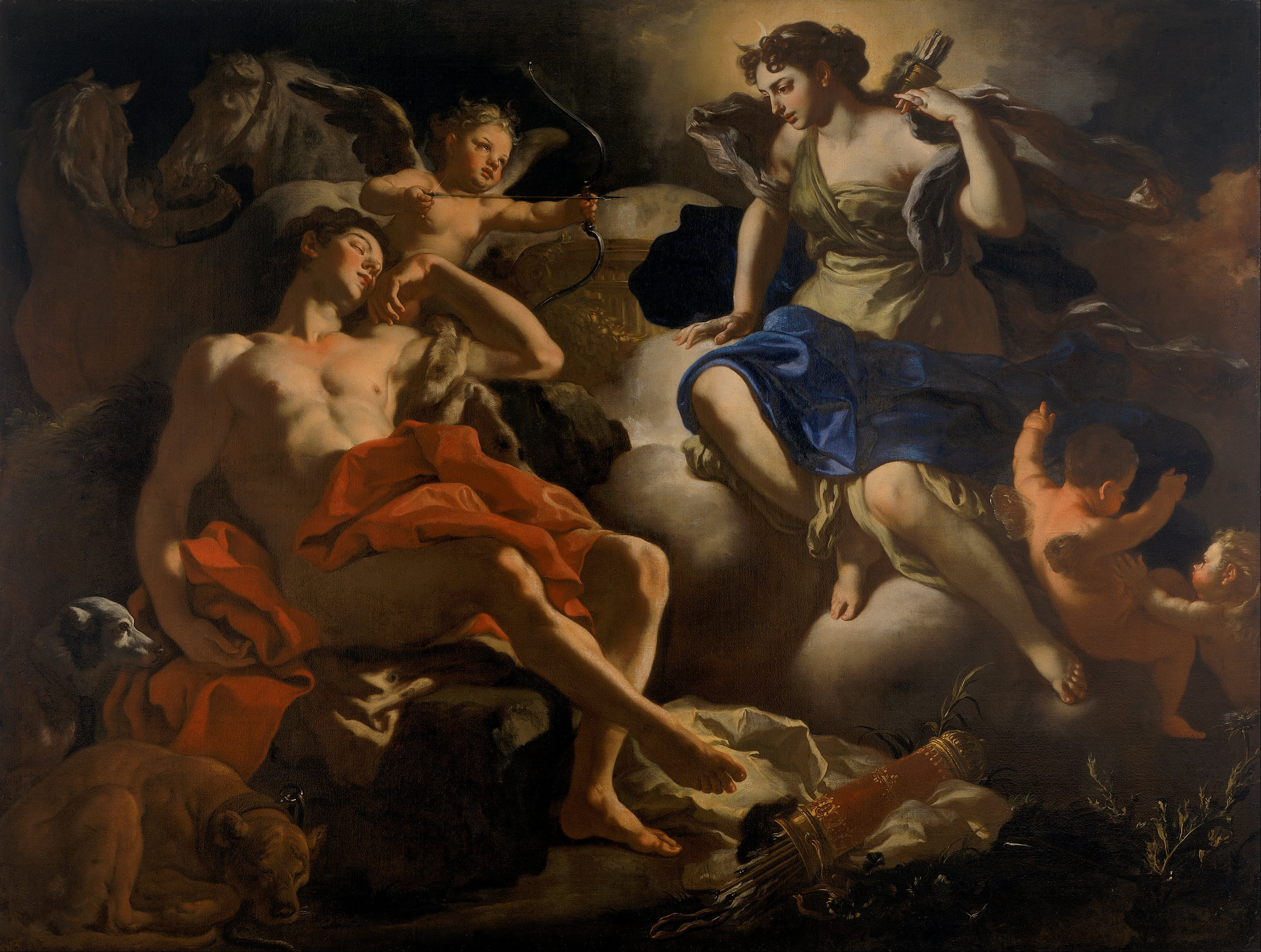
Diana and Endymion, 1705–1710

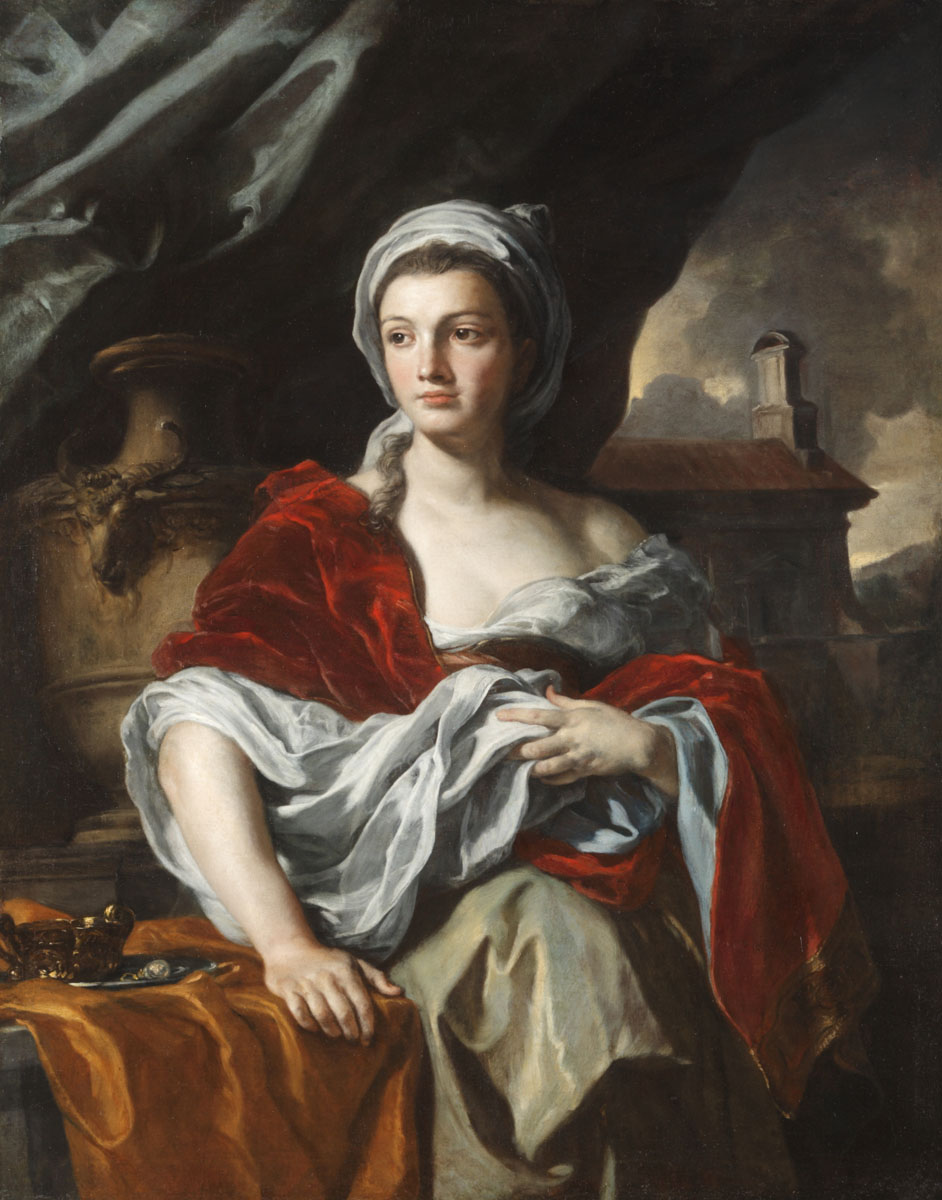
Portrait of a woman

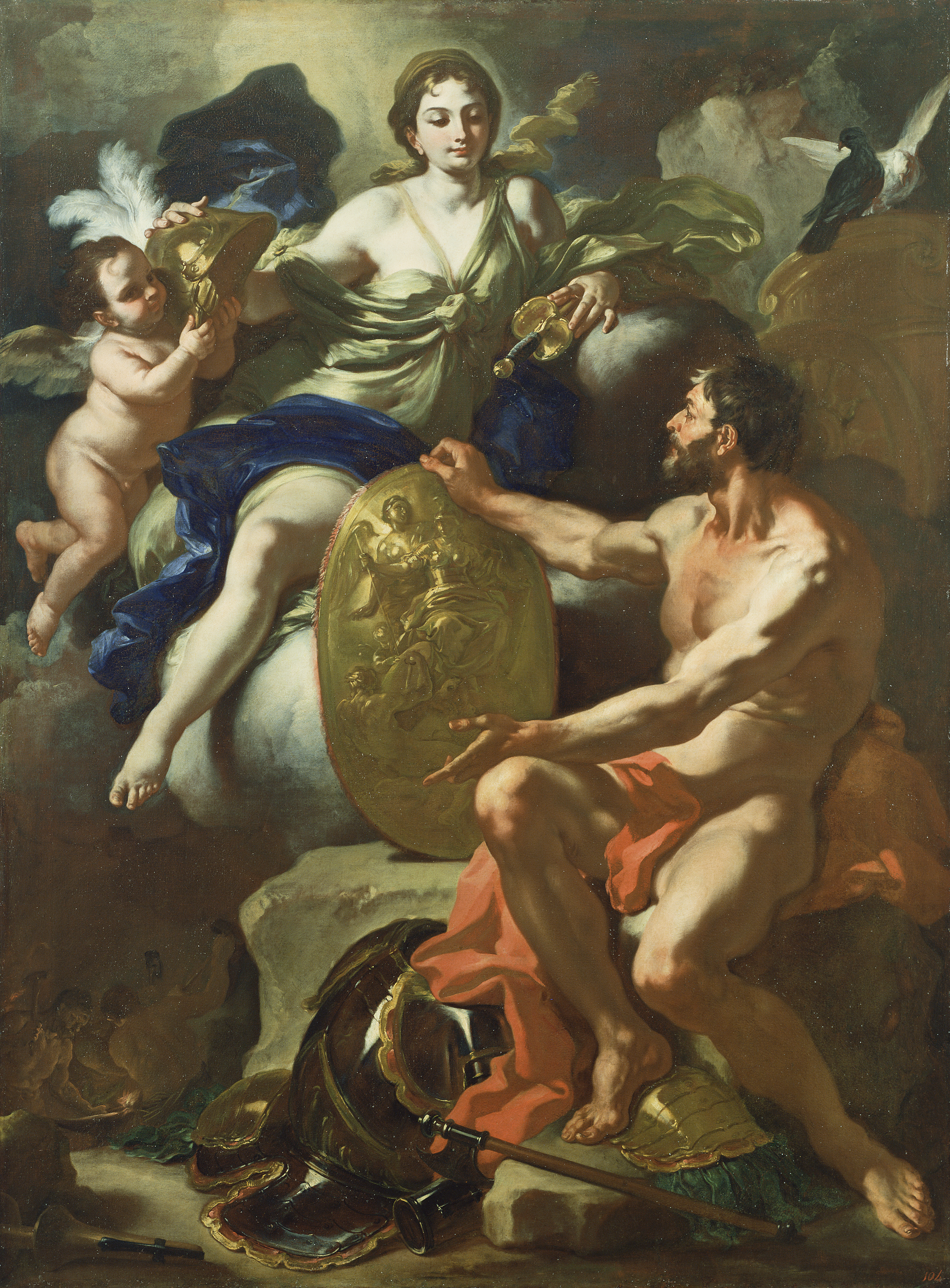
Venus at the Forge of Vulcan, 1704

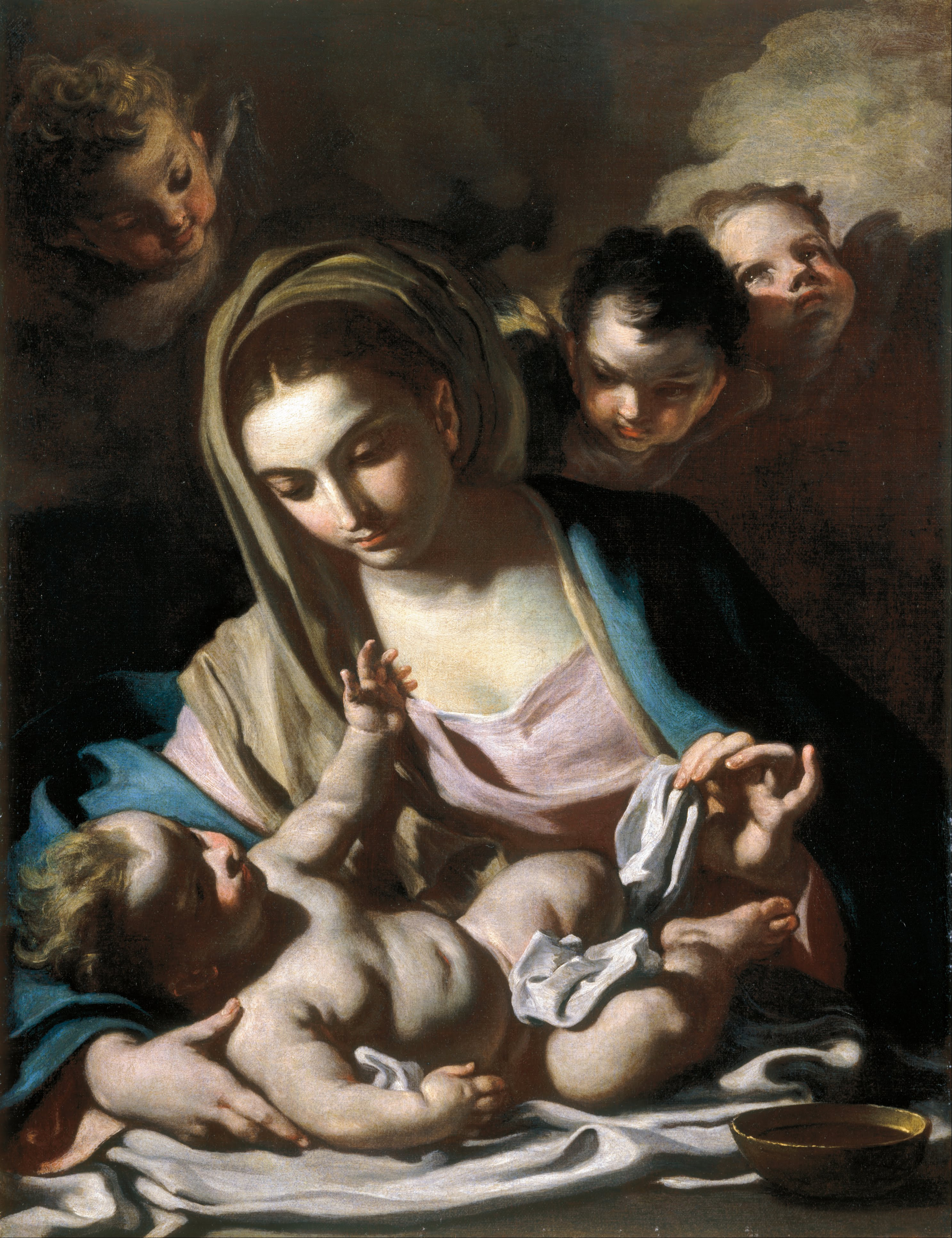
Madonna and Child

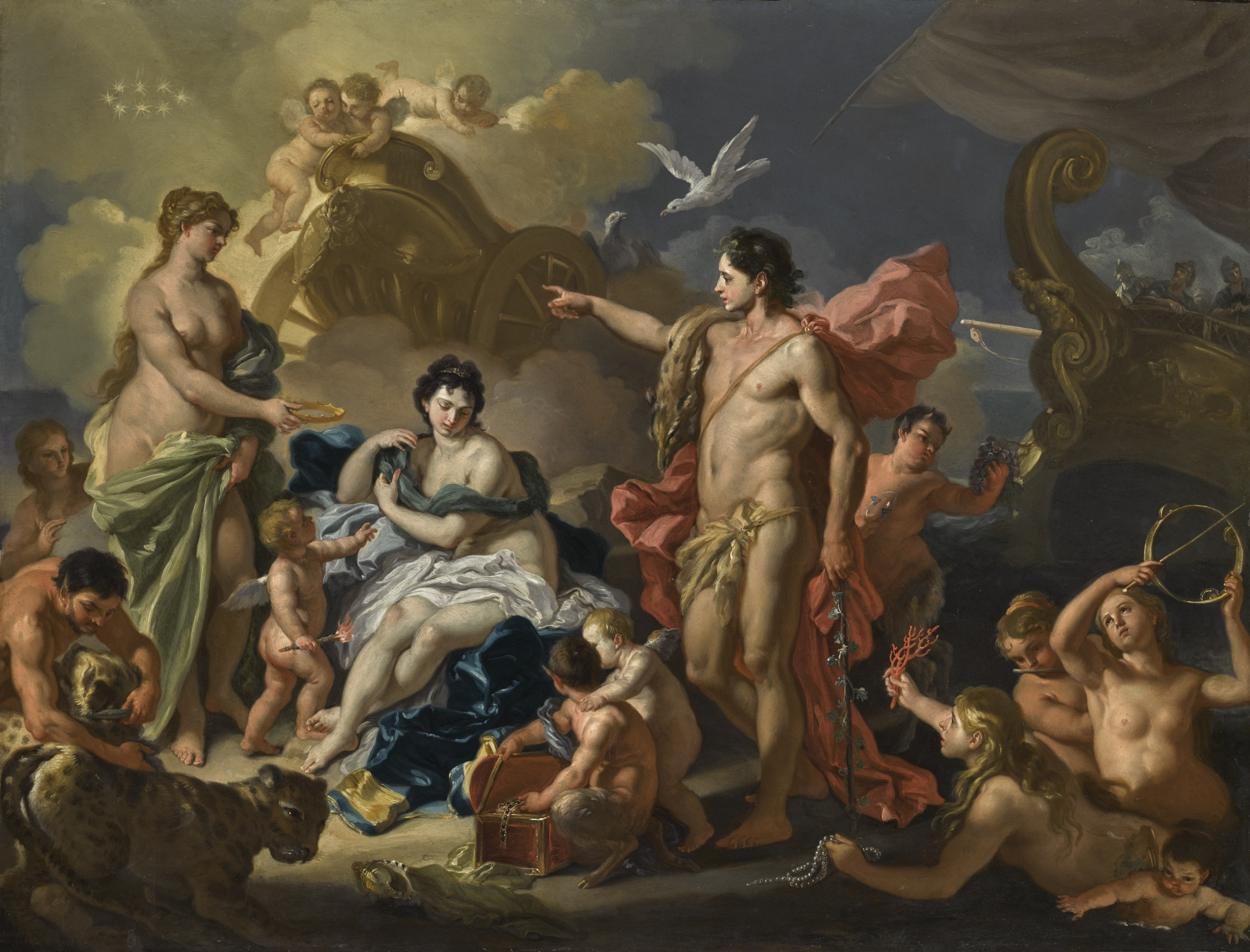
Bacchus and Ariadne

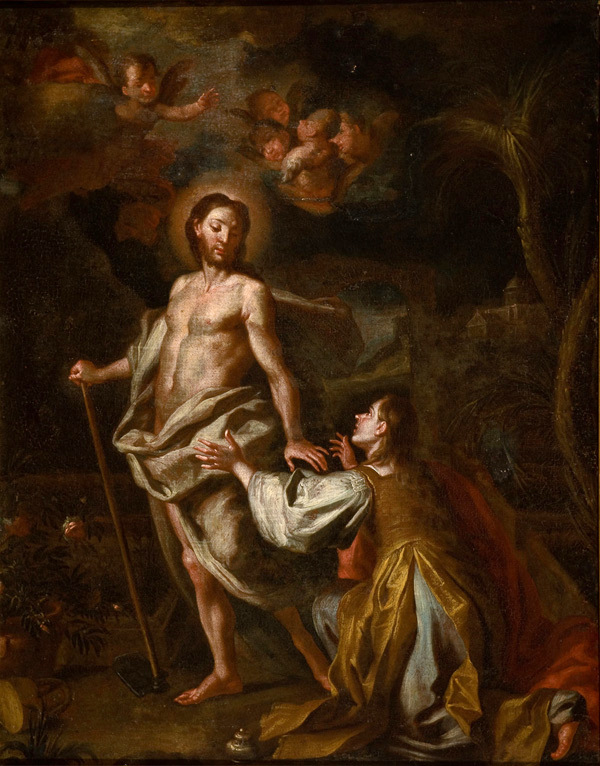
Noli me tangere

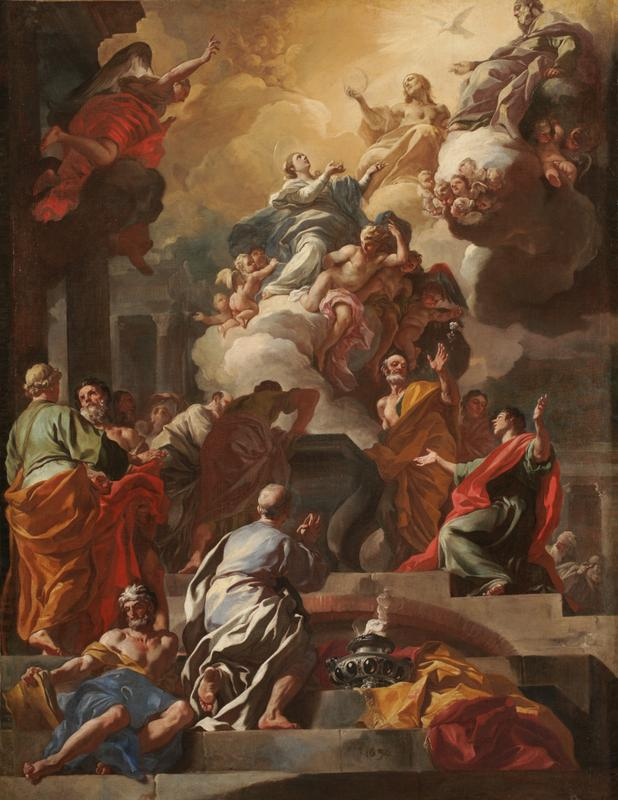
The Assumption

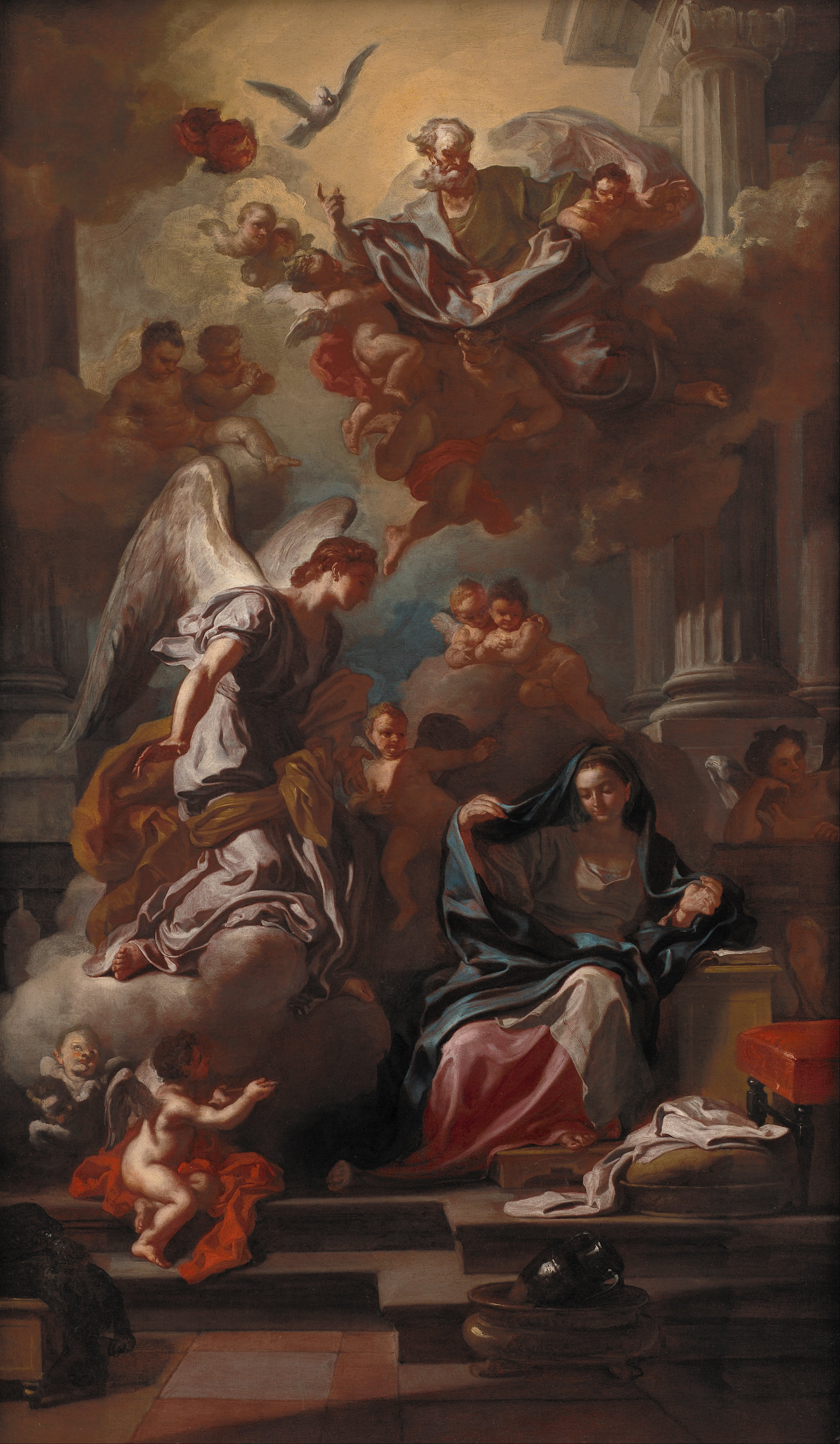
The Annunciation

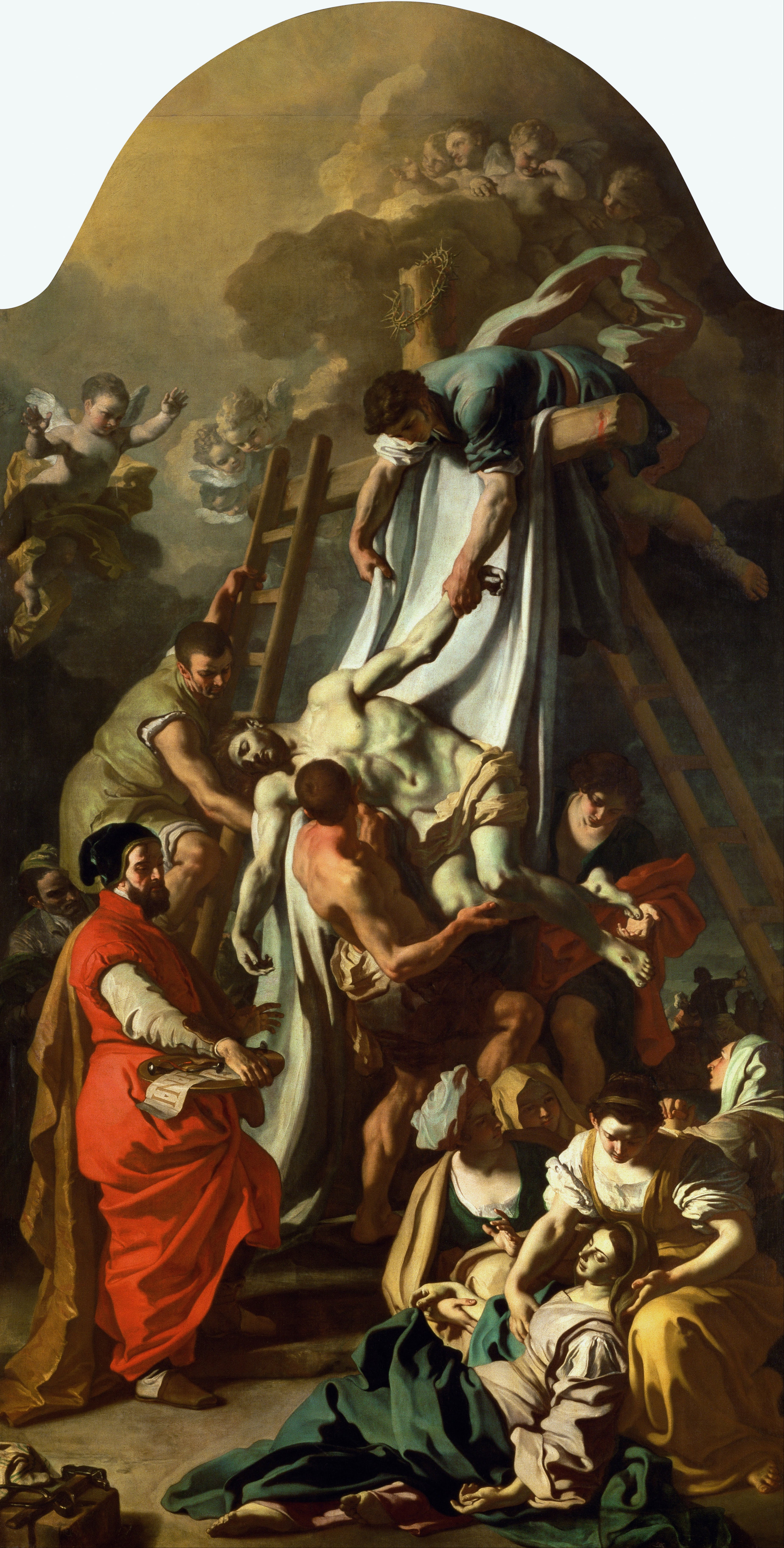
The Deposition

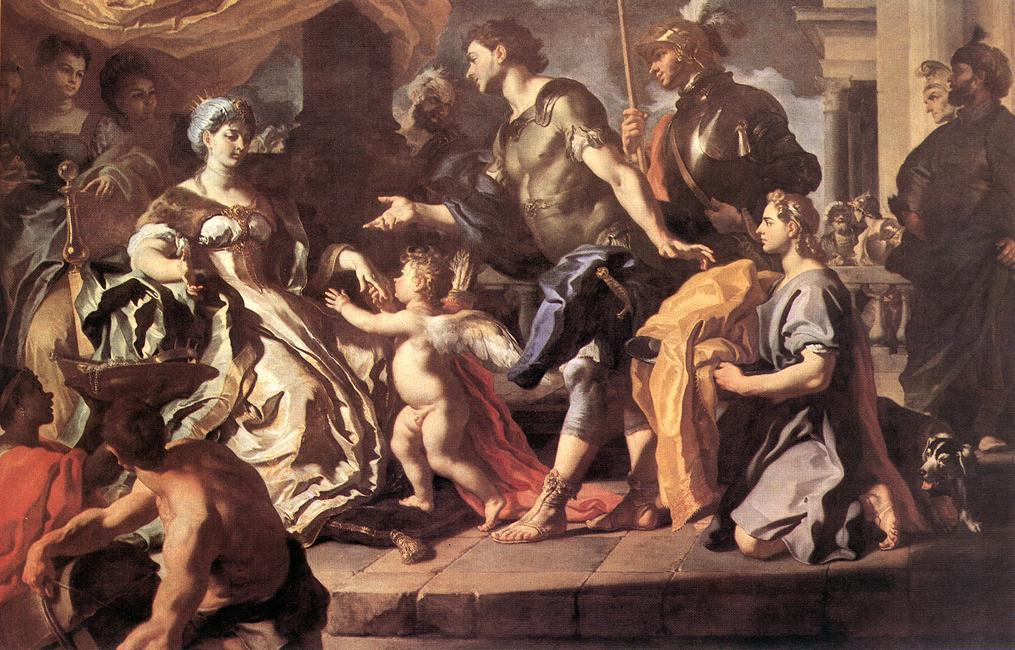
Dido Receiving Aeneas and Cupid Disguised as Ascanius

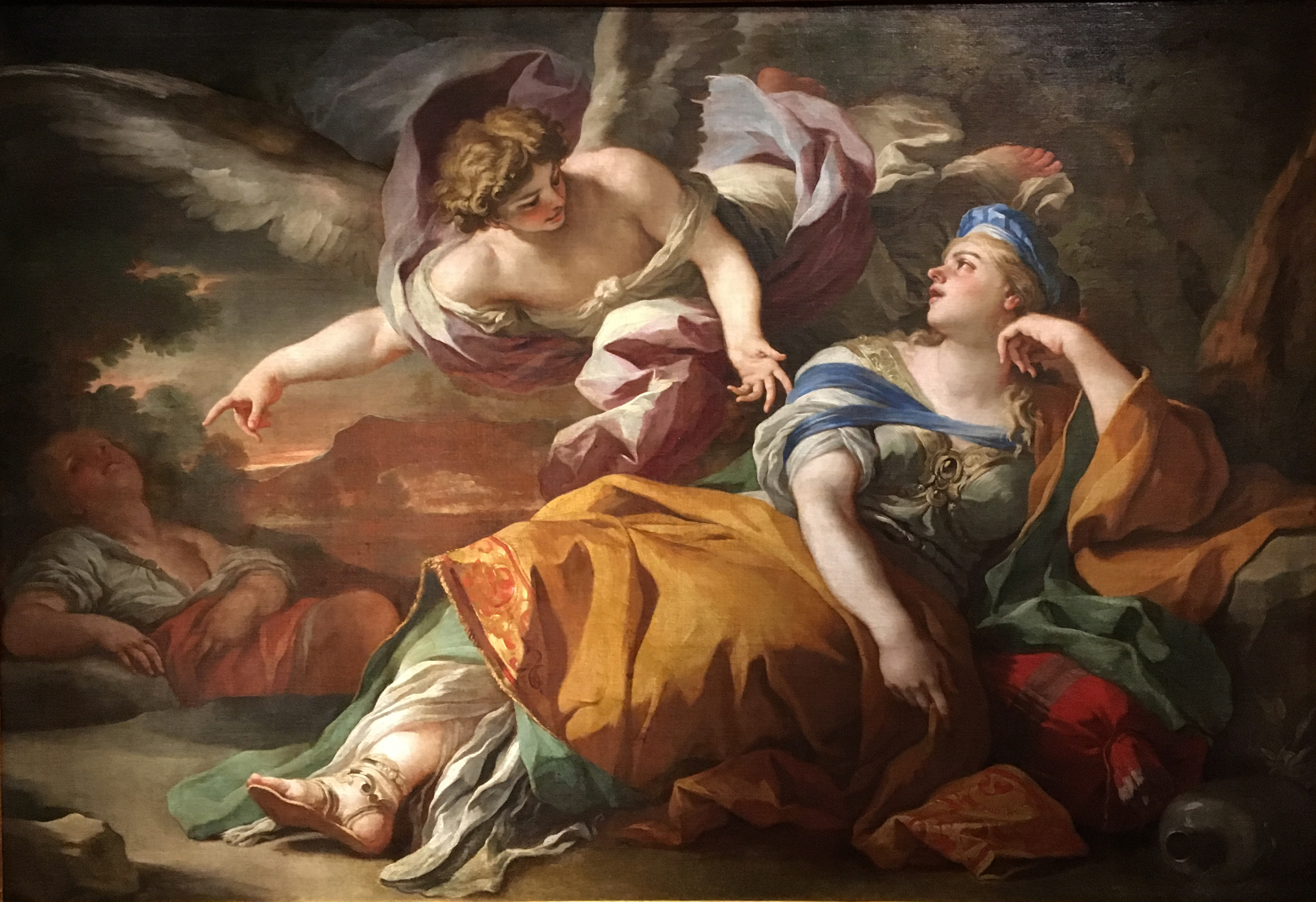
Hagar and Ismail in the Desert comforted by the Angel

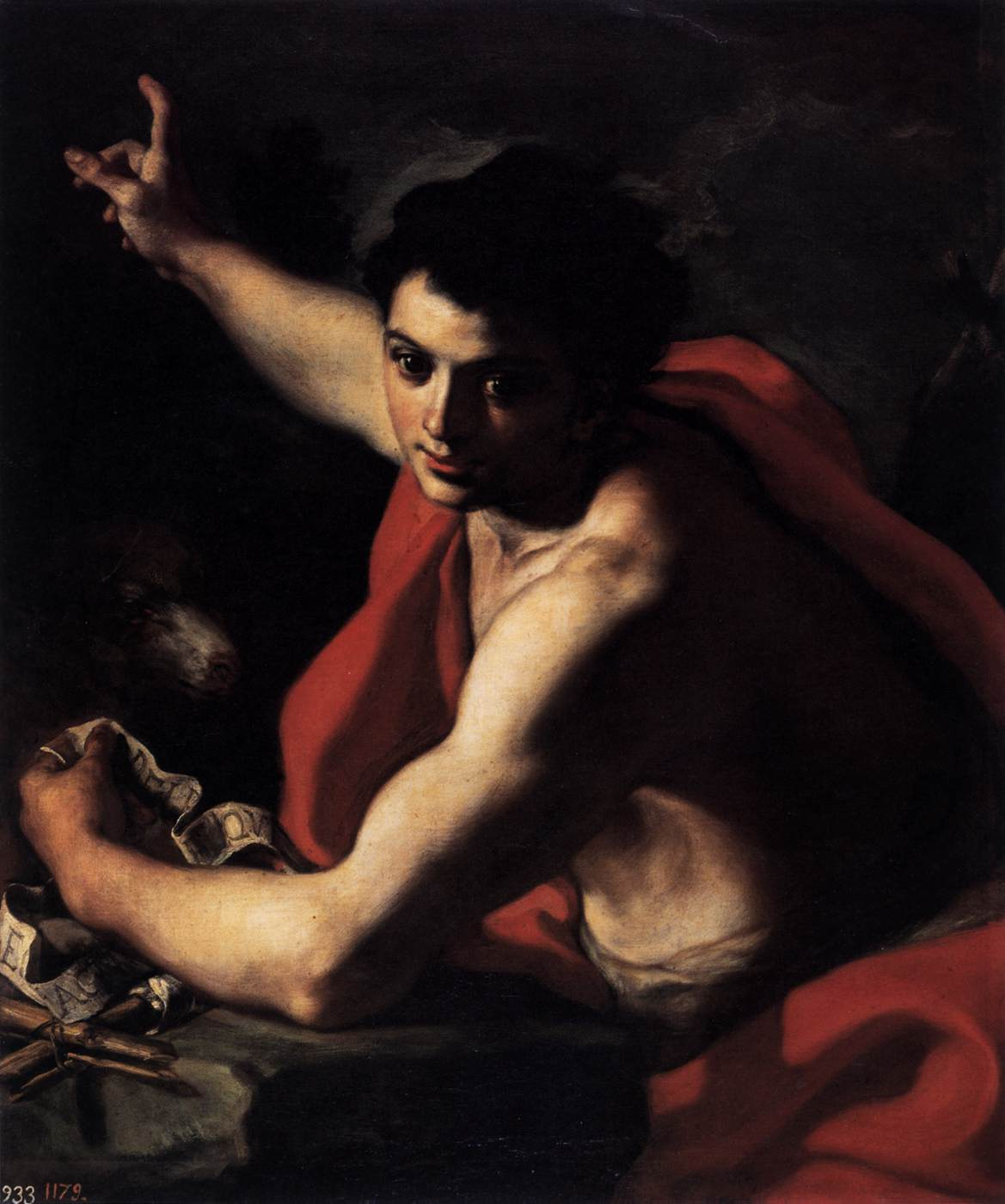
St. John the Baptist

== Bibliography ==
- Dominici, Bernardo de' (1743). "Angelo and Francesco Solimena". Vite de' pittori, scultori, ed architetti napoletani. Vol. III. Naples: Ricciardi. pp. 579–638.
- Boni, Filippo de' (1852). Biografia degli artisti ovvero dizionario della vita e delle opere dei pittori, degli scultori, degli intagliatori, dei tipografi e dei musici di ogni nazione che fiorirono da' tempi più remoti sino a' nostri giorni (2nd ed.). Venice: Presso Andrea Santini e Figlio.
- Minieri-Riccio, Camillo (1844). Memorie storiche degli scrittori nati nel regno di Napoli. Naples: tip. dell'Aquila di V. Puzziello. p. 243.
- Farquhar, Maria (1855). Ralph Nicholson Wornum (ed.). Biographical catalogue of the principal Italian painters. London: Woodfall & Kinder.
- Bologna, Ferdinando (1958). Francesco Solimena. Naples: L'Arte tipografica.
- Spinosa, Nicola (1979). "More Unpublished Works by Francesco Solimena". The Burlington Magazine. 121 (913): 211–76. JSTOR 879557.
- Pavone, Mario Alberto (1980). "Precisazioni su Orazio Solimena". Prospettiva. 20: 80–87. JSTOR 24419996.
- Wittkower, Rudolf (1980). Art and Architecture in Italy, 1600-1750. Pelican History of Art. Penguin Books Ltd. pp. 462–465.
- Bologna, Ferdinando (1982). "La dimensione europea della cultura artistica napoletana nel XVIII secolo". Arte e civiltà del settecento a Napoli. Bari. pp. 31–78.
- Pisani, Salvatore (2002). "»Ce peintre étant un peu délicat...«: Zur europäischen Erfolgsgeschichte von Francesco Solimena". Zeitschrift für Kunstgeschichte. 65 (1): 43–72. JSTOR 4150696.
- Pavone, Mario Alberto (2003). "Solimena family". Grove Art Online. Oxford University Press. doi:10.1093/gao/9781884446054.article.T079630.
- "Francesco Solimena". www.getty.edu. J. Paul Getty Museum. Archived from the original on 6 December 2005.
