= Romualdo Polverino =

Italian painter

Romualdo Polverino (circa 1700–1731) was an Italian historical painter. He trained, alongside Scipione Cappella, under Francesco Solimena. Like Cappella, he was known mainly for his ability to make copies of the latter master's paintings. These copies were in high demand and often sold as originals. He died young of an illness that had stunted his stature.
