= Diana and Endymion =

Diana and Endymion may refer to:

- Diana and Endymion (Solimena)
- Diana and Endymion (Langlois)
- The Loves of the Gods
