= Vegliante =

Vegliante is a surname. Notable people with the surname include:

- Eleonora Vegliante (born 1973), Venezuelan tennis player
- Eugenio Vegliante, Italian painter
