= Andrea dell'Asta =

Italian painter

Andrea dell'Asta (c. 1673–1721) was an Italian painter of the late-baroque period.

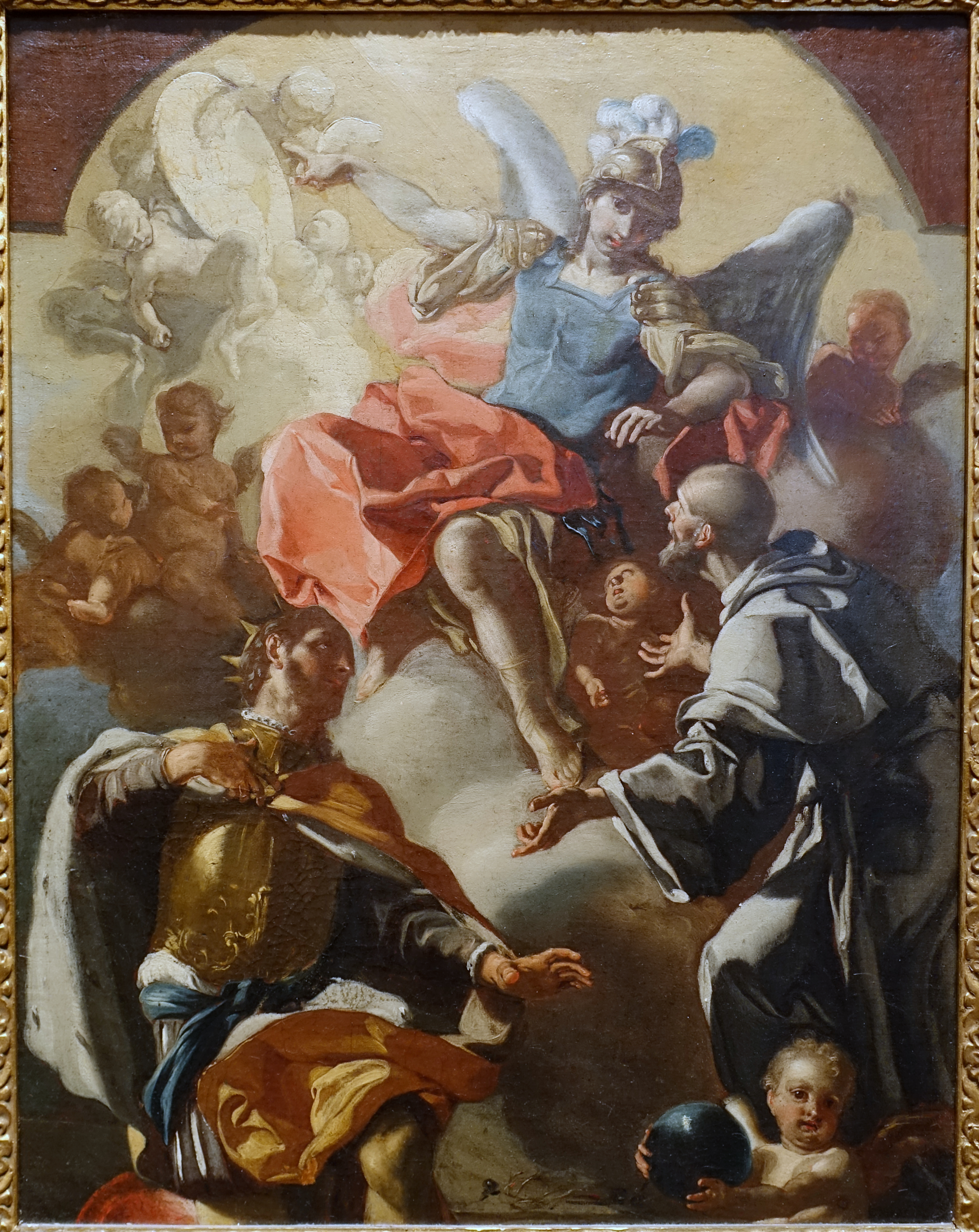
Andrea dell'Asta, Saint Michael, Saint Bruno, and Saint Louis of Toulouse, after 1709, oil on canvas, Blanton Museum of Art, Austin, Texas

== Biography ==
Born in Bagnoli Irpino, he died in Naples. He trained with Francesco Solimena, and worked for a time in Rome, carefully studied the works of Raffaello Sanzio and Domenichino. His name has myriad spellings, the painter himself used Aste but other have used d'Asti, D'Asti, Dell'Asti, etc. Much of his work in Naples was destroyed by World War II. He painted a Nativity and Epiphany for the church of the Santa Teresa degli Scalzi in Naples. He also painted an Annunciation for Santa Maria dell'Avocata and a Madonna of sorrows for San Giovanni Battista delle Monache. The National Museum of Abruzzo (L'Aquila) owns some of his paintings. He died in Naples.

Among his pupils was Matteo Siscara.
