= Salvatore Pace =

Italian painter (1679–1733)

Salvatore Pace (1679 – April 13, 1733) was an Italian painter of the late-Baroque.

== Biography ==
He was born in Naples and trained and worked in the studio of Francesco Solimena. He often restored works in Neapolitan churches.
