= Diana and Endymion (Solimena) =

Painting by Francesco Solimena

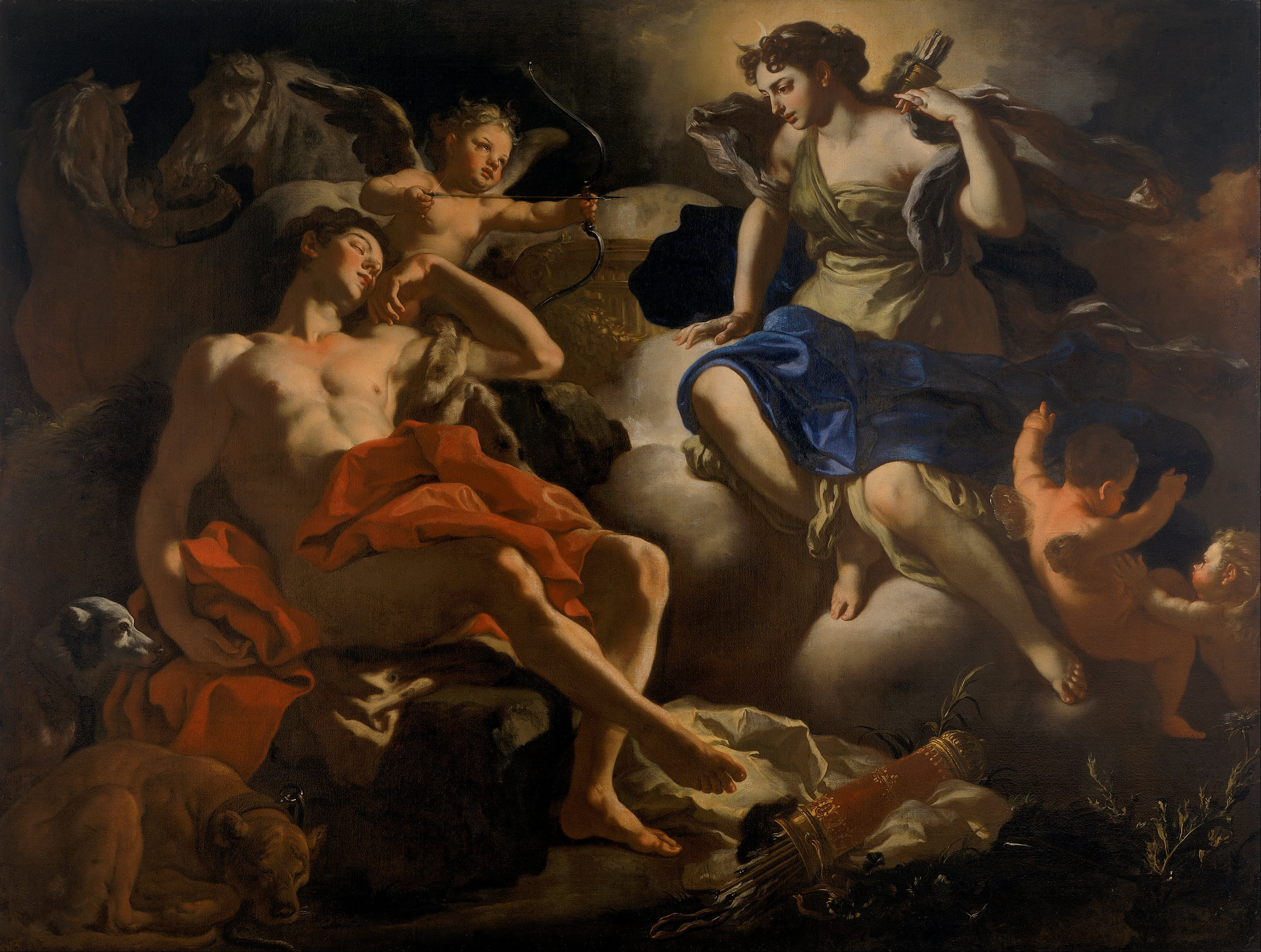
- Artist: Francesco Solimena
- Year: 1705–1710
- Medium: oil on canvas
- Dimensions: 164 cm × 206 cm (65 in × 81 in)
- Location: National Museums Liverpool

Diana and Endymion is a painting by Francesco Solimena undertaken from 1705 until 1710. The painting depicts the Roman goddess Diana, one of the twelve Gods and Goddesses of Olympus, falling in love with Endymion, a symbol of timeless beauty. The story tells of Diana's love for the beautiful youth Endymion. The painting is hosted at the National Museums Liverpool, that purchased the painting in 1966, and holds it as one of the museums highlights.

== Painter ==
The painter Francesco Solimena came from an artistic family, his father being the poet and painter Angelo Solimena. The young Francesco was very talented from an early age in arts, but his father, in spite of the fact he was an artist himself, forced his son to study to become a lawyer. Cardinal Vincenzo Orsini, who later became Pope Benedict XIII, was the person who discovered Francesco Solimena's talent and arranged for him to be an artist.

== Diana and Endymion ==
In Greek mythology, the moon goddess, Selene, drives her moon chariot across the heavens, although she was also regarded as the personification of the Moon itself. Selene is best known for her affair with the beautiful mortal Endymion, the young shepherd who used to sleep on a mountain, and with whom she had fifty daughters. The late 7th-century – early 6th-century BC poet Sappho had apparently already mentioned Selene and Endymion's history. In Roman mythology, Diana has the attributes of Selene and she was mentioned as the goddess who falls in love with Endymion. Both goddesses were regarded as lunar goddesses, except for the fact that in Roman mythology, Diana became a virgin goddess.

== Painting ==
Diana and Endymion is part of the last period of Solimena's works when he mainly concentrated on mythological subjects; he developed this interest in mythological stories which was inspired by the Arcadian movement embracing classical culture. The painting was part of the artist's rivalry with the painter Paolo de Matteis, triggered by the artist's visit to Rome in 1701. Diana in Greek mythology is the goddess associated with hunting, the Moon and chastity, often depicted while hunting, or bathing after the hunt, accompanied by nymphs. Solimena chose to paint Diana's unrequited love towards the young and handsome shepherd; the painting is an allegory of Platonic love. Endymion used to go to sleep on the mountaintop where he guarded his sheep. Diana was falling in love with his beauty, but her love remained unfulfilled, because Diana was a chaste goddess. She is depicted here as a huntress wearing a short robe, arriving from the sky, seated on clouds, in a chariot drawn by horses, while Endymion's body is depicted naked. Cupid points an arrow towards her, ready to shoot. Diana has her gaze fixed on the sleeping youth's body, with a mixture of desire and despair.

According to the legend Diana used to come and kiss Endymion when he was asleep on the top of the mountain each night. Diana's light touch partly drew Endymion from his slumber and he caught a brief glance of her. Incredulous at her beauty, he attributed it to a dream and began to prefer his dreamlike state over mundane daily routines yet he was never awake when she was present. (Note: Endymion, half wakened by her touch, caught a fleeting vision of the fair goddess as she hastened to her chariot. ... Each night when the bright rays of the moon fell on his upturned face he dreamed this wonderful dream, but he was always sleeping when the goddess came, and never saw her in her full and dazzling beauty. The days now seemed long and dreary to Endymion, and he waited anxiously for the night that he might see again the glorious vision.) Through her love, Endymion was granted eternal youth and timeless beauty.
