= Sarno Cathedral =

Church in Sarno, Italy

Coordinates: 40.8278°N 14.6116°E

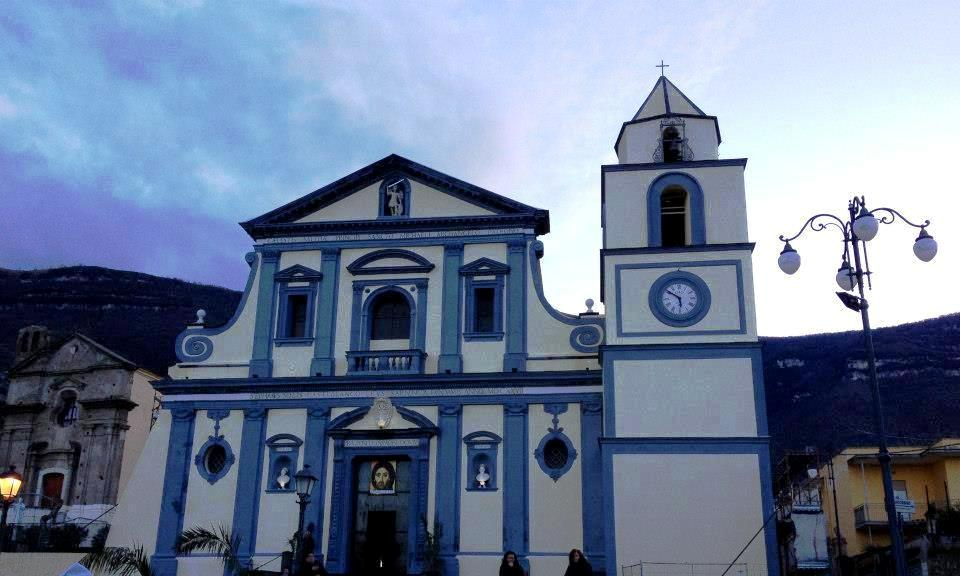
West front of the cathedral

Sarno Cathedral (Italian: Duomo di Sarno; Basilica Concattedrale di San Michele Arcangelo) is a Roman Catholic cathedral dedicated to Saint Michael in Sarno, a municipality in the province of Salerno, region of Campania, Italy. Formerly the seat of the Bishops of Sarno, since 1986 it has been a co-cathedral of the Diocese of Nocera Inferiore-Sarno.

== History ==
There was a church on the site, dedicated to Saint Michael, from before 1066, when it became a cathedral. A new church was erected in 1620, although the presbytery was a century older. Today only the bell-tower retains Romanesque architectural elements in the windows and roof. After damage caused by the eruption of 1631, it was refurbished.

The church contains works by Angelo Solimena and his studio, including the ceiling paintings. The sacristy ceiling was also frescoed in the 18th century.
