= Ferrante Amendola =

Italian painter

Ferrante Amendola (1664–1724) was an Italian historical painter, active in Naples.

== Biography ==
He studied under Francesco Solimena, in whose style he painted for some time, but afterwards imitated that of Luca Giordano. He painted many works at Naples, among them two altar-pieces in the Church of the Madonna di Montevergine. Nagler mentions an ingenious picture, by this artist, of a Quack Doctor's Shop in the Royal Gallery at Munich. Bernardo de Dominici says that Amendola's chief merit consisted in a practical facility of coloring, and that he completely failed in his attempt to imitate the masterly style of Giordano, especially in the draperies.
