= Tommaso Martini =

Italian painter (1688–1755)

Tommaso Martini (Bivongi, Calabria, 1688 – 5 January 1755) was an Italian painter of the late-Baroque period.

== Biography ==
By 1723, he had moved to Naples. He is said to have trained with Francesco Solimena, and later under Luca Giordano. He was active in Naples and Rome. He painted an altarpiece of "Virgin and Saints" for the church of Chiesa della SS. Trinità in Petrizzi.
