= Michele Foschini =

Italian painter

Michele Foschini (September 14, 1711 – c. 1770) was an Italian painter, active in a late Baroque style.

He was born in Guardia Sanframondi. He studied under Niccola Maria Rossi, a pupil of Francesco Solimena. He was respected for his quadratura, and painted in both fresco and oil for churches of Naples, and some rooms in the Royal Casino at Portici. He painted frescoes (1732) for the church of the Fathers of San Giovanni di Dio and in (1738) for the ceiling of Santa Maria della Pace both churches in Naples.
