= Collegiata di San Michele Arcangelo, Solofra =

Church in Solofra, Italy

Coordinates: 40°49′44.8″N 14°50′42.9″E

Collegiate Church of St Michael Archangel
- Collegiata di San Michele Arcangelo
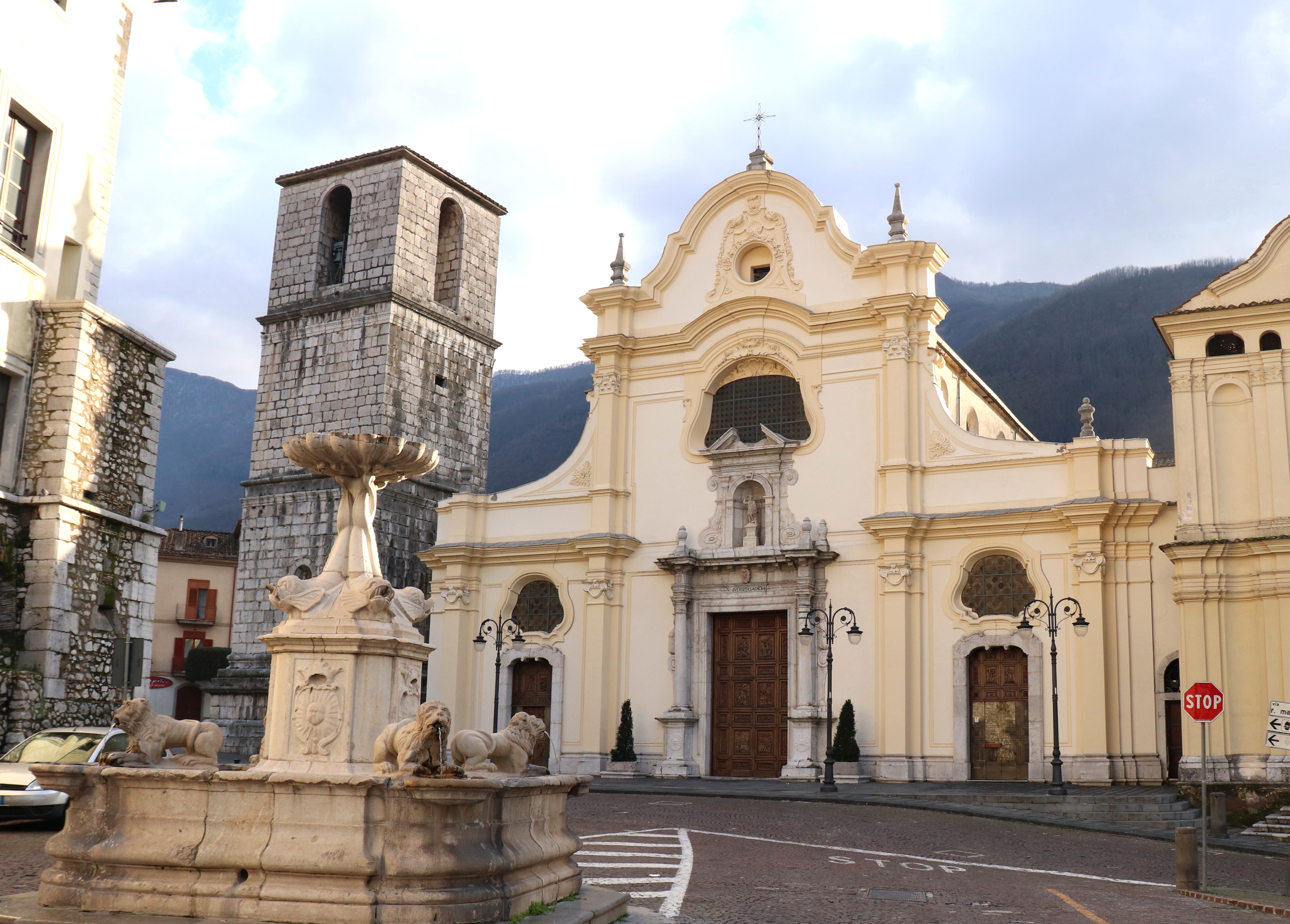

- Location in Italy
- Location: Solofra, Province of Avellino
- Country: Italy
- Denomination: Roman Catholic

History
- Status: Basilica
- Founders: University of Solofra (Universitas): Wooden ceiling canvases by Giovanni Tommaso Guarino and Francesco Guarino; Carved pulpit by Giovanni Antonio Scavo
- Dedication: Saint Michael the Archangel

Architecture
- Functional status: Active
- Architectural type: Latin cross
- Style: Baroque
- Groundbreaking: 1522

Specifications
- Length: 46 m
- Width: 23 m

Administration
- Diocese: Roman Catholic Archdiocese of Salerno-Campagna-Acerno

The Collegiata di San Michele Arcangelo, translated as Collegiate Church of St Michael Archangel, is a richly decorated, Baroque style, Roman Catholic church in Solofra, Province of Avellino, Italy.

== History ==
The collegiata was instituted by the University of Solofra in 1522. The church building was completed in 1614, and proclaimed basilica in 1685. Over the centuries, it has required a number of reconstructions due to earthquakes. The bell-tower was built in 1564. The idiosyncratic facade, with three portals, has sculptures representing St Michael, the evangelists, and Fathers of the church; it faces the central square in town and the Palazzo Orsini.

The interior is remarkable for a wooden roof with twenty one framed canvases painted by Giovanni Tommaso Guarino, and depicting events from the old testament, while the transept has a ceiling with scenes from the new testament painted by Giovanni Tommaso's brother, Francesco. Other works in the church include an Epiphany by Andrea Sabbatini and an Assumption of the Virgin, witnessed by the Saints by Giovanni de Mari. The main altarpiece is a Coronation of the Virgin (1594 by Giovanni Battista Lama. Below the main altarpiece is a gilded statue of St Michael Archangel.

The church has an elaborated decorated and gilded front to the organ, and carved pulpit by the studio of Giovanni Antonio Scavo.
