= Francesco Guarino =

Italian painter

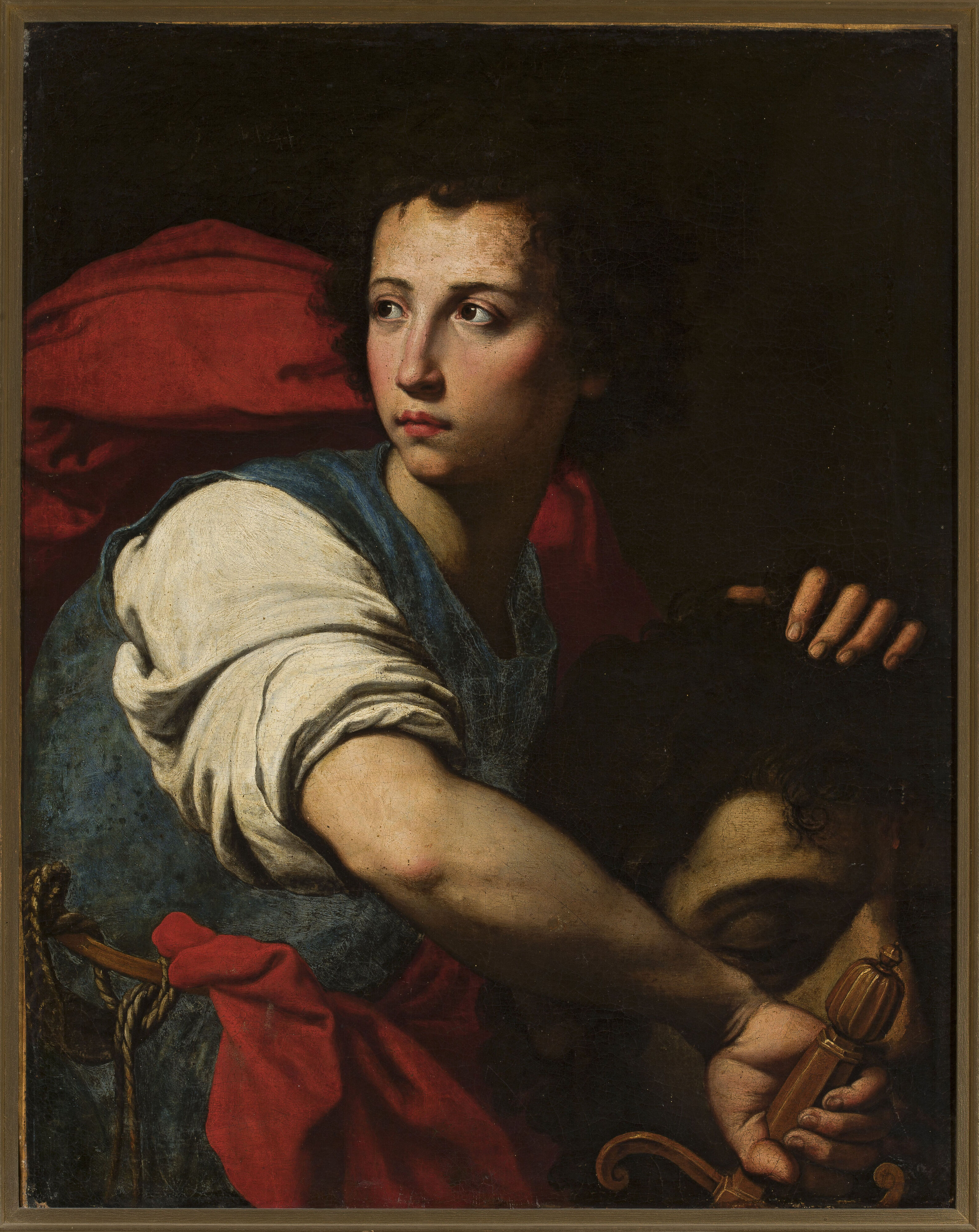
- Francesco Guarino, David with Goliath’s head, c. 1645, National Museum in Warsaw
- Born: January 19, 1611; Sant'Andrea Apostolo, Solofra
- Died: November 23, 1651 (aged 40); Gravina in Puglia, Kingdom of Naples
- Other name: Francesco Guarini
- Education: Massimo Stanzione
- Occupation: Painter
- Movement: Baroque
- Patrons: Orsini family

Francesco Guarino or Guarini (19 January 1611 – 23 November 1651) was an Italian painter of the Baroque period, active mainly in the mountainous area east of Naples called Irpinia, and in other areas of the Kingdom of Naples, chiefly Campania, Apulia, and Molise.

== Biography ==
Francesco Guarino was born in Sant'Andrea Apostolo, today a frazione of Solofra in the Province of Avellino, Campania, and died in Gravina in Puglia. He was a pupil first locally of his father, Giovanni Tommaso Guarino, before moving to Naples to work in the studio of Massimo Stanzione. In Naples, like many of his contemporaries there, he was influenced by the style of Caravaggio. In his selection of models who appear to have been plucked from the streets of Naples, he recalls the style of Bernardo Cavallino, the fellow-pupil of Stanzione.

Between c. 1630 and 1635 he painted his first important works, a series of canvases for the ceiling of the Collegiata di San Michele Arcangelo, Solofra. The earliest are the Agony in the Garden (in collaboration with his father), the Liberation of St. Peter, a highly individual response to Caravaggio, Joseph’s Dream and Joseph Warned by the Angel. In the same church the more richly composed Christ among the Doctors and Circumcision, distinguished by the weightier realism of the figures, reveal the influence of Jusepe de Ribera and Francesco Fracanzano.

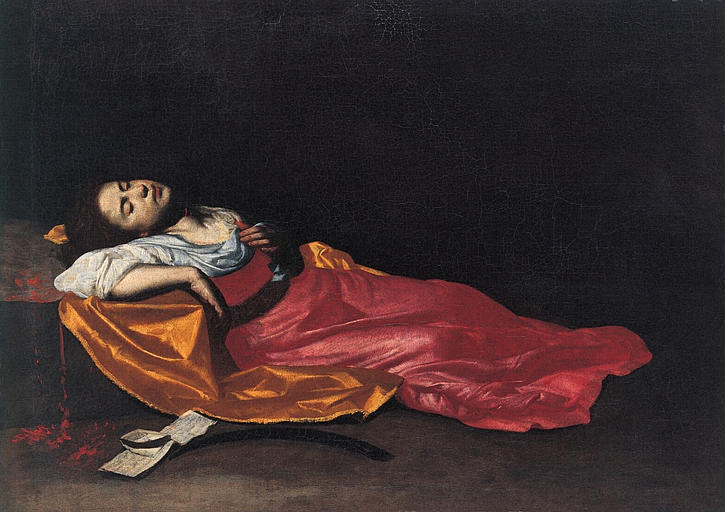
Martyrdom of Saint Cecilia, c. 1650, Museum of Grenoble

A little later, in the damaged Annunciation to the Shepherds, also in San Michele, the grave naturalism of the humble figures suggests the impact of Velázquez, who had been working in Italy between 1629 and 1631. Two paintings of the Martyrdom of St. Agatha (Sant’Agata Irpina, parish church) showing her tortured, one with burning coals and the other by having her breasts cut off, are from the same period; the figure types and the composition of the second seem to be directly inspired by Velázquez’s Bacchus and his Companions (c. 1628; Madrid, Museo del Prado). In his later paintings of St. Agatha (Moscow, Pushkin Museum; c. 1637, Naples, Museo di Capodimonte) Guarino explored the type of female half-length study introduced by Simon Vouet and Massimo Stanzione, focusing on the refined sensuality of the subject, whom he portrayed with one shoulder bare, languidly holding a blood-stained cloth to her mutilated breasts.

Later Guarino, in such works as the Immaculate Conception (1637; Solofra, San Michele) and the elegant Annunciation (1642; Solofra, San Michele), developed, like many Neapolitan painters of the 1630s, a brighter, warmer palette, indebted to Venetian colour. He also painted small pictures, such as the nine scenes from the Life of St. Anthony Abbot (1642; Campobasso, Sant’Antonio Abate). The altarpiece in this church, the Miracle of St. Benedict, with, above it, the Pietà (1643) and the pair of pictures Esau Selling his Birthright and Isaac Blessing Jacob (1640–42; Pommersfelden, Schloss Weißenstein), bear a complex relationship to Stanzione and Ribera. The two stories of Jacob, with three-quarter-length figures, unite a powerful naturalism with a new formal clarity. The paintings are richly decorative and sumptuous fabrics are rendered in brilliant blues, bright reds and yellows.

The increasing influence on Guarino of the more elegant, academic style of Stanzione is apparent in the two versions of the Madonna of the Rosary (1644, retouched by the artist in 1649, Solofra, San Domenico; and 1645, Nocera Inferiore, Santa Maria di Materdomini) and in the Madonna del Suffragio (c. 1649; Gravina in Puglia, Chiesa del Suffragio). The more classical style of his last works for San Michele at Solofra, the Baptism, the Assumption and Christ among the Angels, show the increasing influence of Poussin, Domenichino and Francesco Cozza. Guarino’s most important patrons were the Orsini family of Gravina and Solofra, and many of his paintings remain in their Neapolitan palace. He died at their court, involved, according to Bernardo de' Dominici, in a crime of passion. Angelo Solimena was one of his pupils.

== Gallery ==
Francesco Guarino

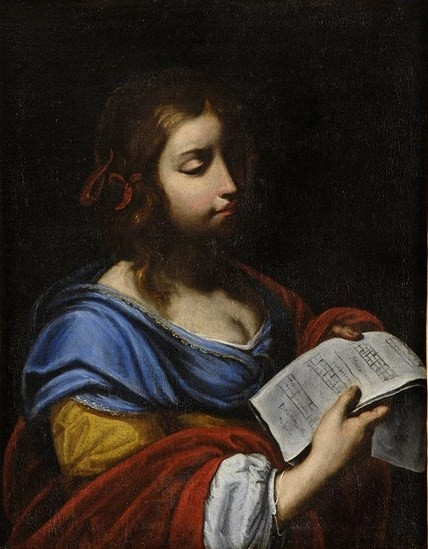
St. Cecilia, 1645, Palazzo Orsini, Naples

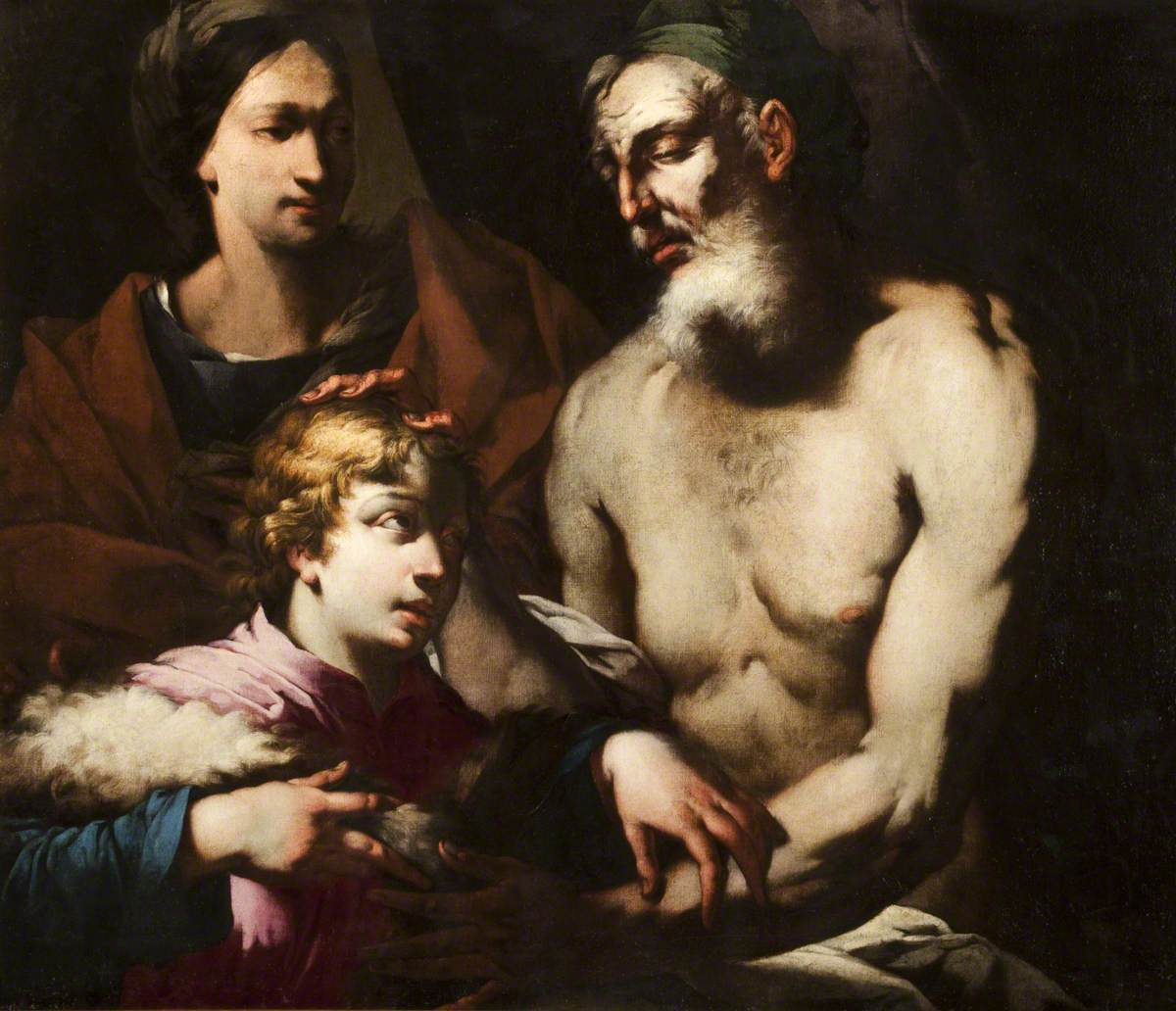
Isaac Blessing Jacob, 1704, Blackburn Museum and Art Gallery

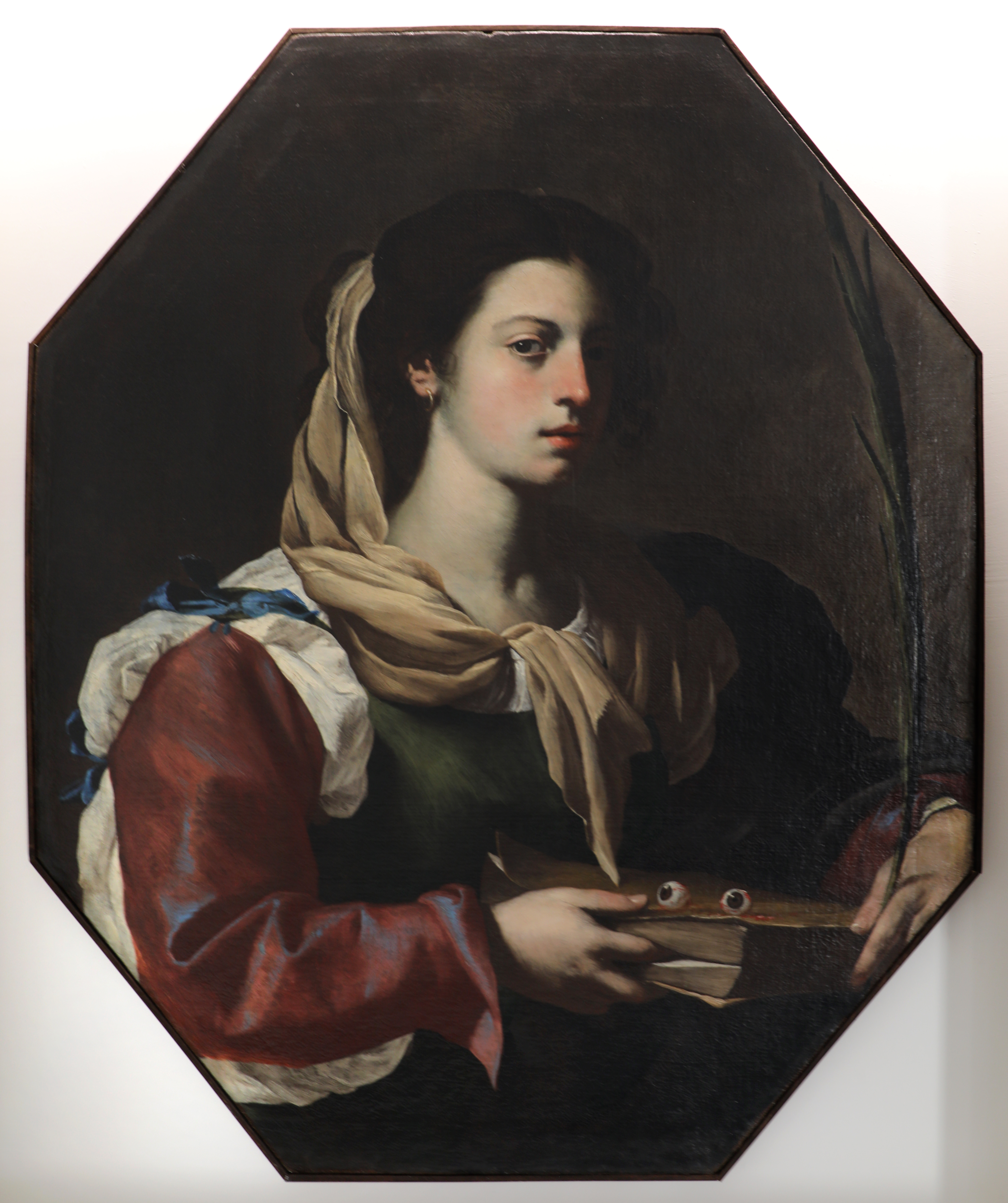
St. Lucia, c. 1645, Galleria Nazionale, Cosenza

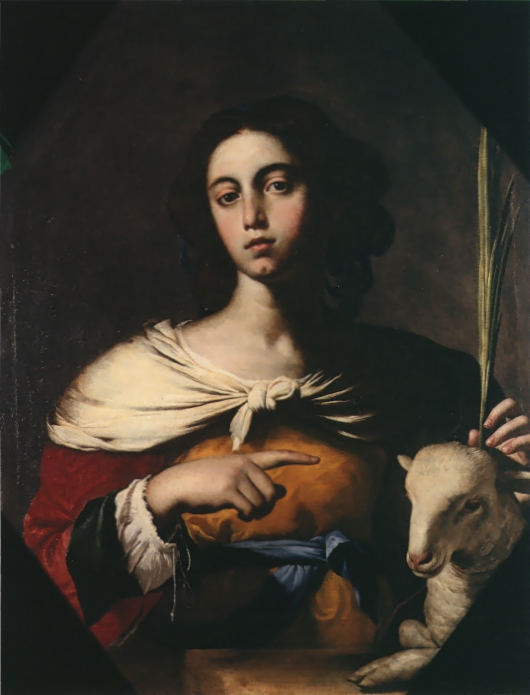
Saint Agnes, 1650, Galleria Nazionale, Cosenza

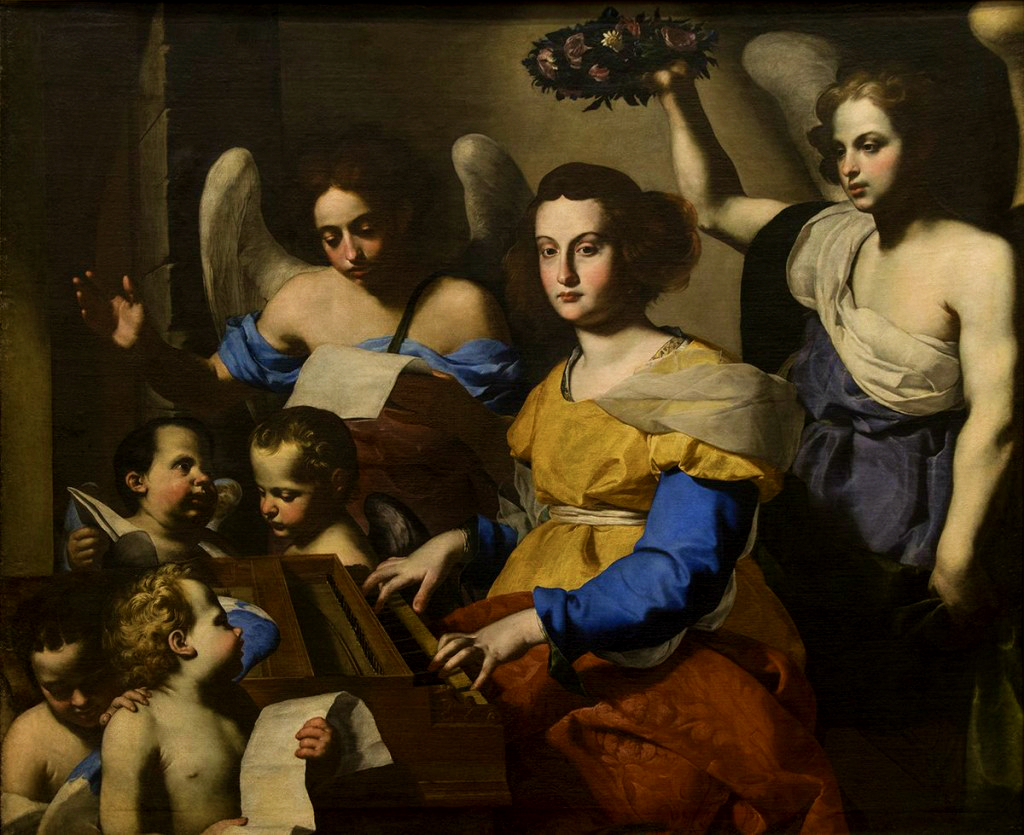
St. Cecilia with the Harpsichord, c. 1645, Museo di Capodimonte, Naples

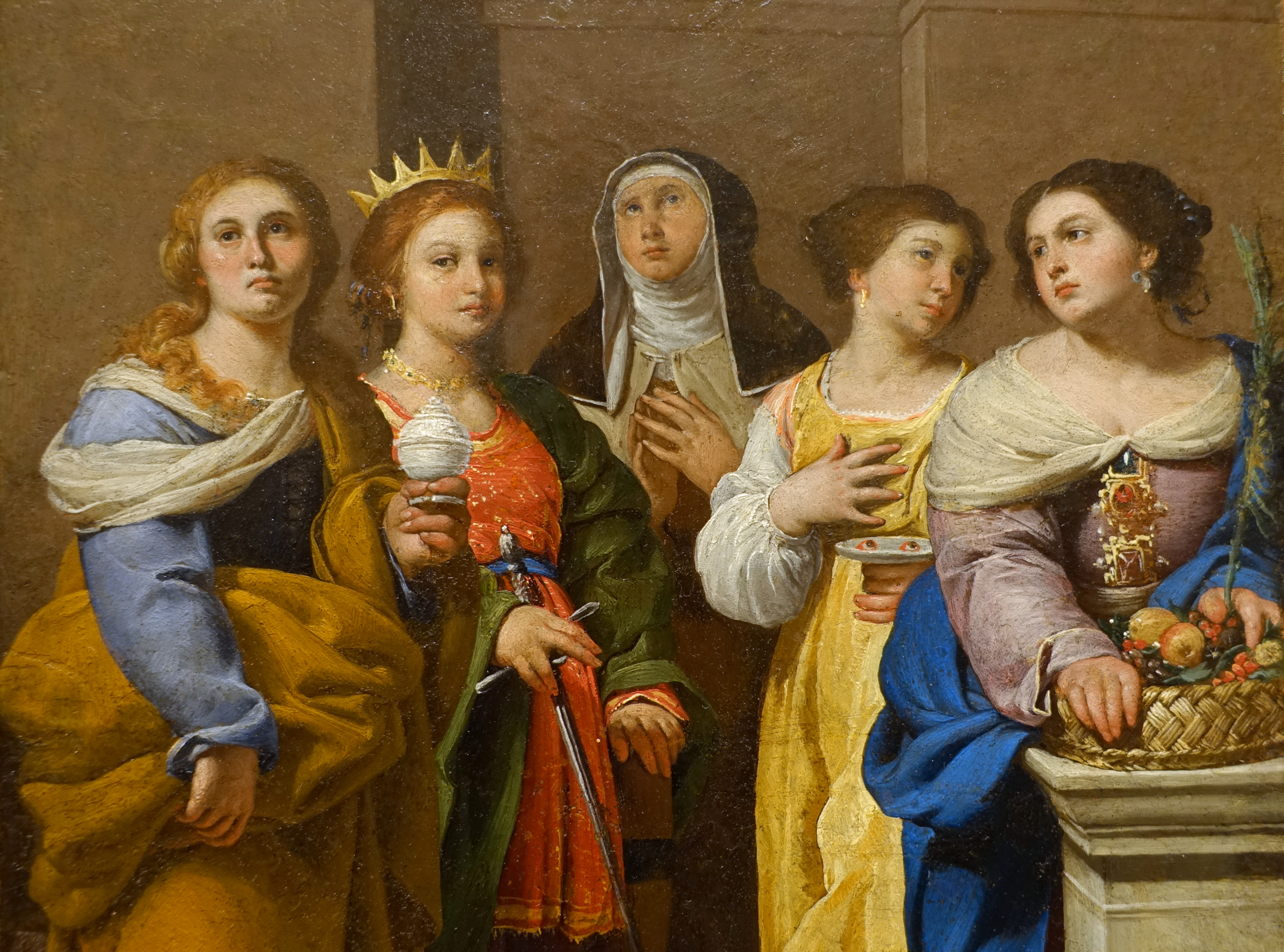
St. Mary Magdalene, St. Catherine of Alexandria, St. Catherine of Siena, St. Lucy, and St. Dorothy, Blanton Museum of Art, Austin, Texas

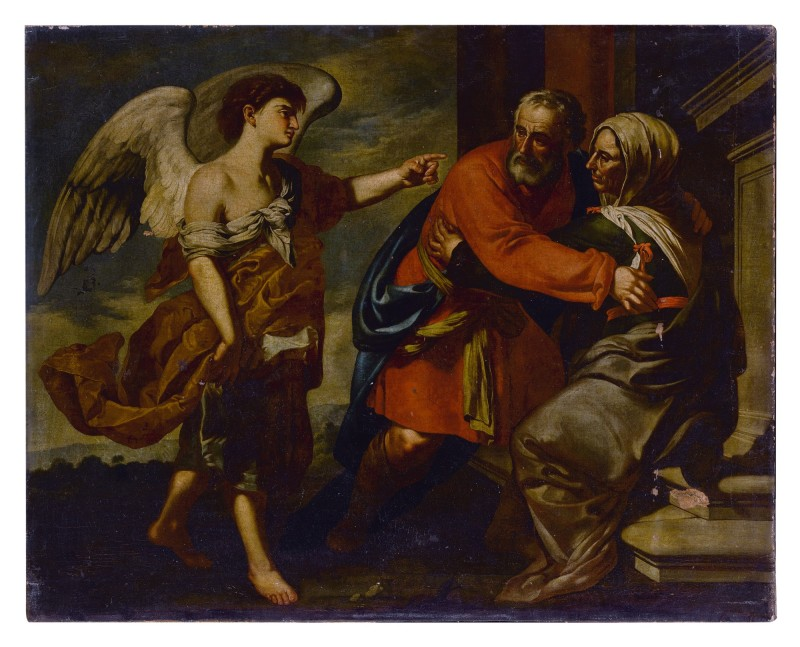
The Meeting of Zechariah and Elizabeth, 1651, priv. col.

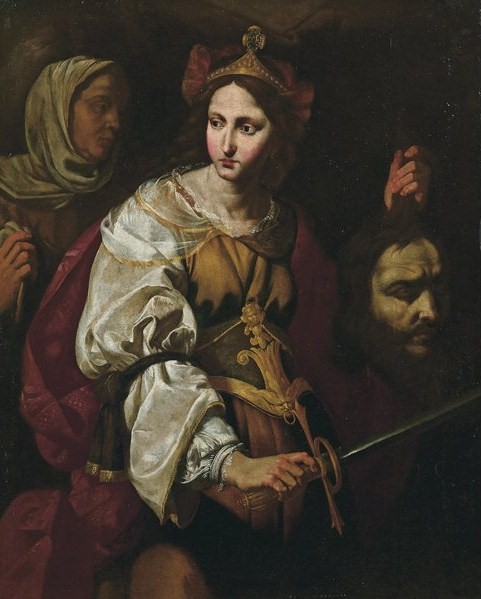
Judith, priv. col.
