= Angelo Solimena =

Italian painter (1629–1716)

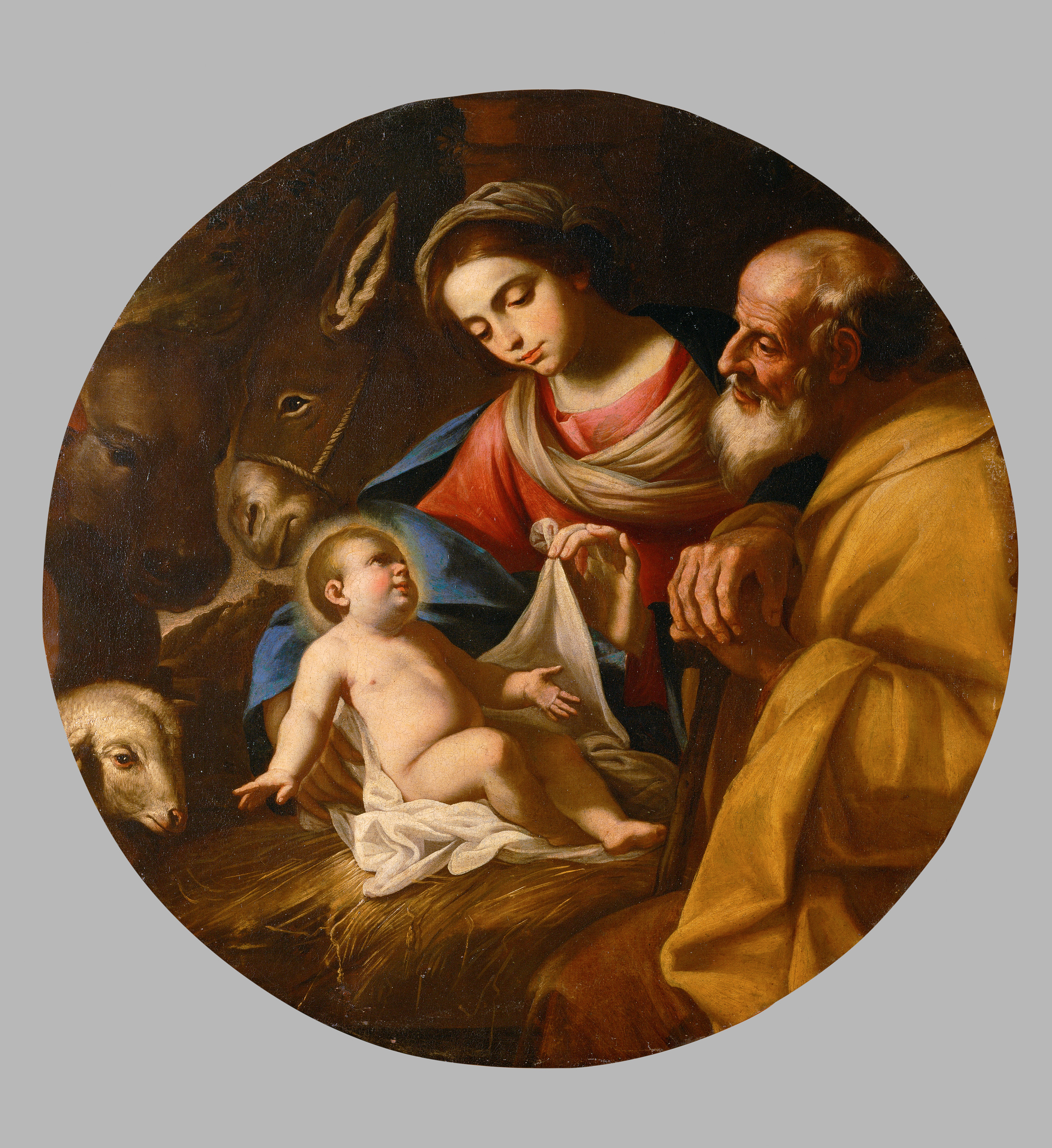
- Angelo Solimena, Holy Family, Kunsthistorisches Museum, Vienna
- Born: 17 November 1629; Canale di Serino, province Avellino, Kingdom of Naples
- Died: February 1716 (aged 86); Nocera Inferiore, Kingdom of Naples
- Education: Francesco Guarino
- Occupation: Painter

Angelo Solimena (Serino, 17 November 1629 – Nocera Inferiore, February 1716) was an Italian painter, father of the better known Francesco Solimena.

== Life ==
Solimena was born in Serino, near Naples, on 17 November 1629. He was a pupil of Francesco Guarino, with whom he seems to have collaborated on canvases (e.g. Virgin and Child with Saints) in the church of the Corpo di Cristo in San Sossio di Serino. One of his earliest paintings is the Pentecost, dated 1654, in San Michele in Solofra, the town in which Guarnino also worked.

His Deposition (1664; Nocera Inferiore, San Matteo) is derived from Federico Barocci’s painting of that subject in Perugia Cathedral. His Virgin and Saints (1667; Gravina, church of the Purgatorio) and St. Francis Requesting Plenary Indulgence for Porziuncola (Salerno, San Lorenzo) are close to the art of Massimo Stanzione, and this similarity recurs in the Virgin of the Purification (1671; Sant'Egidio del Monte Albino) and in the Trinity ( 1672; Avellino, Santissima Trinità).

Between 1674 and 1675 Angelo completed an ambitious decorative scheme involving many frescoes depicting saints and biblical scenes for the church of San Giorgio in Salerno. The paintings in the left apse of Salerno Cathedral (the Fall of Manna and Communion of the Apostles) and the frescoes of the parish church in Raito also belong to this period.

Two collaborations with his son Francesco Solimena, Paradise (Nocera Inferiore Cathedral) and the Vision of St Cyril of Alexandria (Solofra, San Domenico), show him moving towards the more modern style of Giovanni Lanfranco and Luca Giordano. After the Coronation of St. Anne (1681; Nocera Inferiore, Sant'Anna) there followed the Trinity with St. Michael in the assembly hall of Nocera Cathedral (1683). Between 1689 and 1694 he completed the decoration of Sarno Cathedral commissioned by Bishop de Tura, with biblical scenes and several compositions featuring St. Michael. The influence of Carlo Maratta’s classicism, which formed the basis of the teaching in Francesco Solimena’s academy, is very clear in his late work, for instance Virgin with St. Matthew and St. Peter (1706; Nocera Inferiore, San Matteo). Solimena died in Nocera Inferiore in February 1716.

== Bibliography ==
- Painting in Naples 1606-1705: from Caravaggio to Giordano. London: Royal Academy of Arts. 1983.
