= Scipione Cappella =

Italian painter

- Occupation: Painter

Scipione Cappella (active 1743) was an Italian historical painter. He was initially trained with his uncle, Domenico Viola, but then became a pupil of Francesco Solimena. He was known mainly for his ability to make copies of the latter master's paintings.
