= Orazio Solimena =

Italian painter (1690–1789)

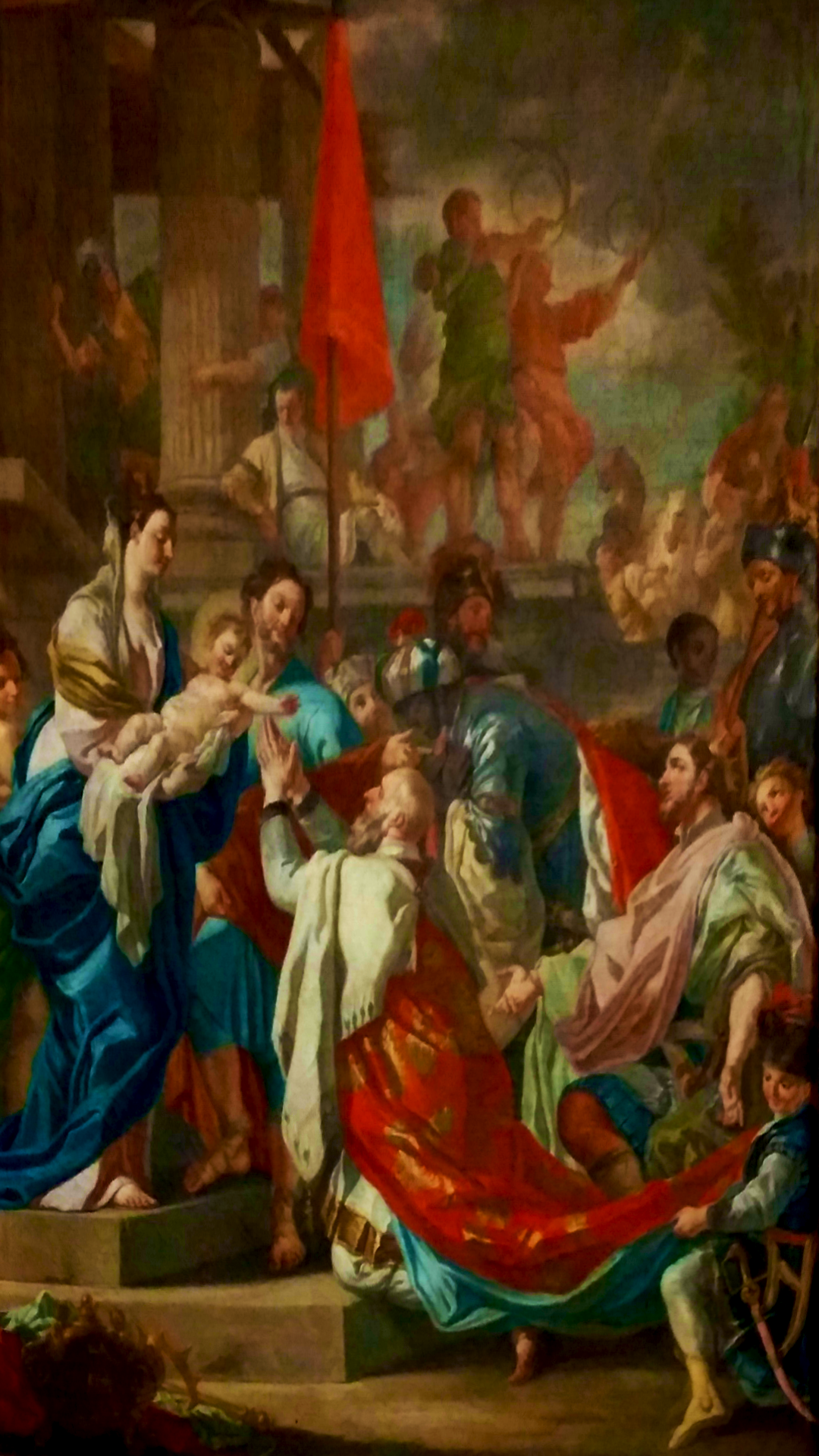
Adoration of the Magi (“Adorazino dei magi”), a 1772 painting by Solimena

Orazio Solimena (1690–1789) was an Italian painter. He was the nephew of Francesco Solimena and became his pupil and successor.

Confusion emerged about Orazio's relation to Francesco. Orazio was traditionally accepted as the nephew of Francesco Solimena. In Pavone's English language article on him in Grove Art Online he suddenly emerged as Francesco's grandson. This is based on a translation error as the Italian word "nipote" can mean either, "nephew" or "grandson". In his original Italian language article on Orazio, Pavone makes it very clear that he is, in fact, his nephew.
