= Eugenio Vegliante =

Italian painter

Eugenio Vegliante or Veglianti (documented 1737–1740) was an Italian painter in Southern Italy.

He arose amid a circle of the pupils and followers of Francesco Solimena. He is known to have painted altarpieces of St Peter and Paul and a Crucifixion for the now-deconsecrated church of San Pietro in Vinculis in Naples. He also painted an Assumption with Saints (1737) for the church of San Nicola di Bari in Summonte in the province of Avellino, Campania.
