= Solofra =

Town in southern Italy

- Comune
- Comune di Solofra
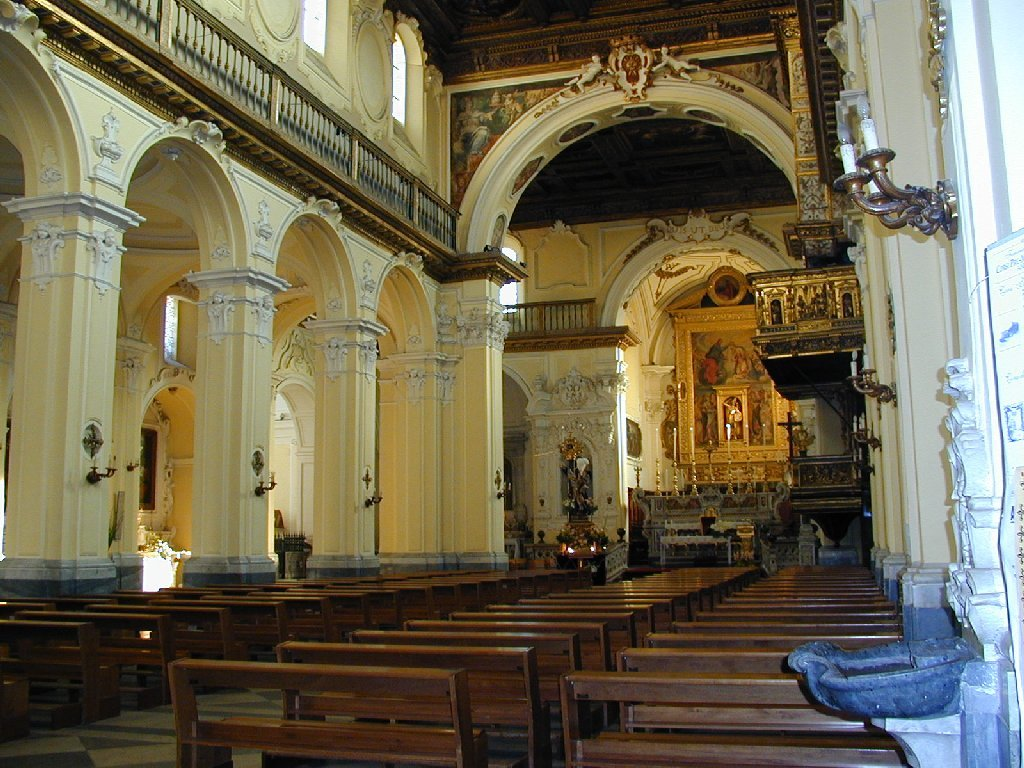
- Interior of Collegiata

- Coat of arms

- Location within Italy Location within Campania
- Coordinates: 40°50′N 14°51′E
- Country: Italy
- Region: Campania
- Province: Avellino (AV)
- Frazioni: Sant'Agata Irpina, Sant'Andrea Apostolo

Government
  - Mayor: Nicola Moretti

Area
  - Total: 22.21 km^{2} (8.58 sq mi)
- Elevation: 384 m (1,260 ft)

Population (28 February 2026)
  - Total: 11,915
  - Density: 536.5/km^{2} (1,389/sq mi)
- Demonym: Solofrani
- Time zone: UTC+1 (CET)
  - Summer (DST): UTC+2 (CEST)
- Postal code: 83029
- Dialing code: 0825
- Patron saint: St. Michael the Archangel
- Saint day: 29 September
- Website: Official website

Solofra (Solofrano: Sulofra, IPA: [suˈloːfrə]) is a town and comune in the province of Avellino, in the Campania region of Southern Italy.

== Geography ==
The town is bordered by Aiello del Sabato, Calvanico (SA), Contrada, Montoro Superiore and Serino. Its frazioni are the villages of Sant'Agata Irpina and Sant'Andrea Apostolo.

== Main sights ==
The Collegiata di San Michele Arcangelo was built in the 16th-17th centuries., and has rich interior decoration with canvases by the Guarino family, and an altarpiece of Giovanni Battista Lama.

== Economy ==
Solofra is known as one of Italy's main centre for the tanning of leather. Another activity present is chestnut cultivation, although for about a decade this has suffered a sharp drop in production due to the Gall wasp that now afflicts most of the chestnut groves in Italy.

=== Solofra Tanning District ===
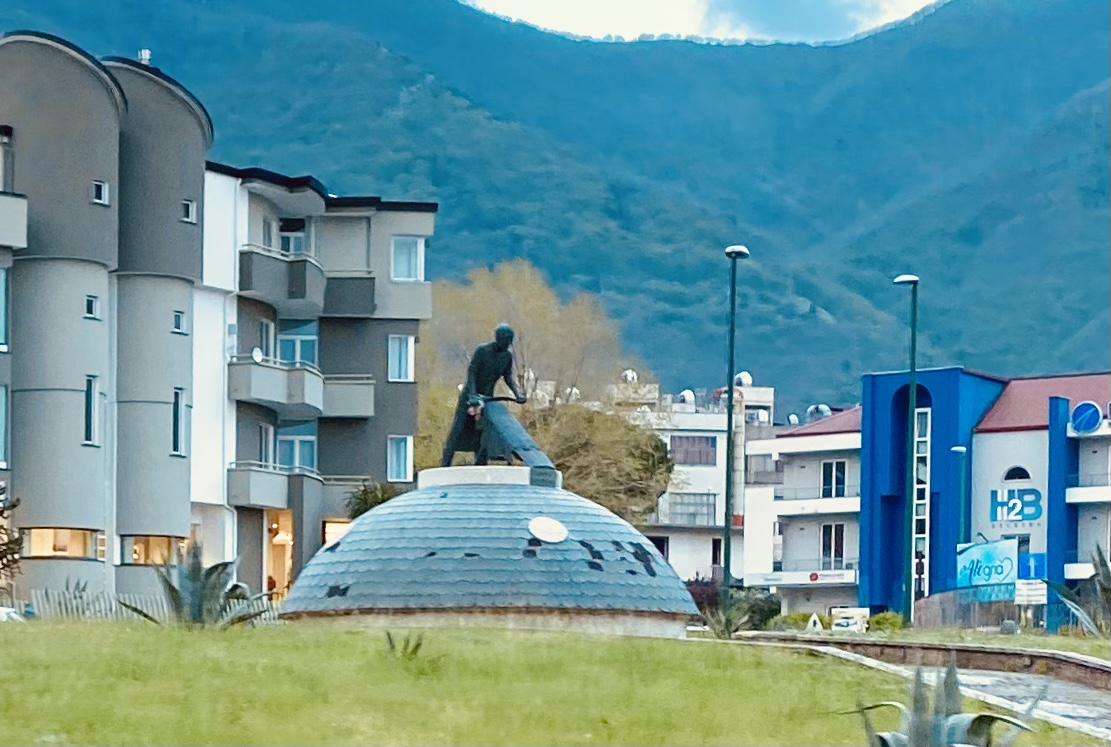
Monument "The Tanner" in Solofra

The tanning district of Solofra extends over a territory of about 60 km², in the southwestern area of the province of Avellino. In addition to Solofra in includes the municipalities of Montoro and Serino, for a total of 35,000 inhabitants. This area is specialized, from a production point of view, in the tanning of sheep and goat hides, for a total of about 400 companies operating in the sector including tanneries, subcontractors and packaging manufacturers, 4,000 - 4,500 employees and an average annual turnover of 1,500 million euros.

In the early 1980s, to find out about the methods of processing leathers, Osama bin Laden came to the city, who had long imported leather from Irpinia for his businesses in Afghanistan and Pakistan.

The leathers on the iconic red vest worn by Michael Jackson in the 1982 music video for Thriller were manufactured in a Solofra tannery.
