= Serino =

- Comune
- Comune di Serino
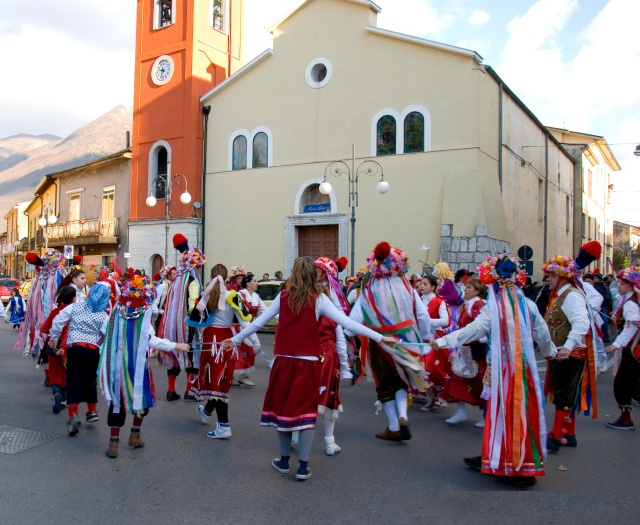
- Carnival in front of Santa Maria della Neve church

- Location within Italy Location within Campania
- Coordinates: 40°51′0″N 14°52′30″E
- Country: Italy
- Region: Campania
- Province: Avellino (AV)

Government
  - Mayor: Vito Pelosi

Area
  - Total: 52.5 km^{2} (20.3 sq mi)
- Elevation: 400 m (1,300 ft)

Population (31 December 2017)
  - Total: 6,968
  - Density: 133/km^{2} (344/sq mi)
- Demonym: Serinesi
- Time zone: UTC+1 (CET)
  - Summer (DST): UTC+2 (CEST)
- Postal code: 83028
- Dialing code: 0825
- Patron saint: St. Francis of Assisi
- Saint day: 4 October
- Website: Official website

Serino is a town and comune in the province of Avellino, Campania, southern Italy.

Famous for its very clean water source, Serino is 51 kilometres (32 mi) from Naples, 21 kilometres (13 mi) from Salerno, 8 kilometres (5 mi) from Avellino and 275 kilometres (171 mi) from Rome. Serino is known for its production of chestnuts and Aglianico wine.

It gave its name to the Roman Aqua Augusta aqueduct which it supplied.

== Notable people ==
- Sabato "Simon" Rodia (1879–1965), sculptor

== Twin towns ==
- Baia Mare, Romania, since 2003
