= Tramonti, Campania =

Comune in Campania, Italy

Tramonti
- Comune
- Comune di Tramonti
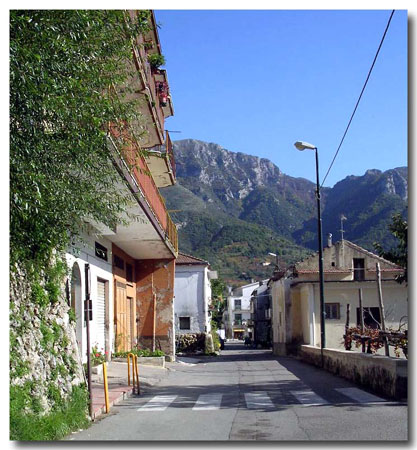
- A square in Polvica

- Coat of arms

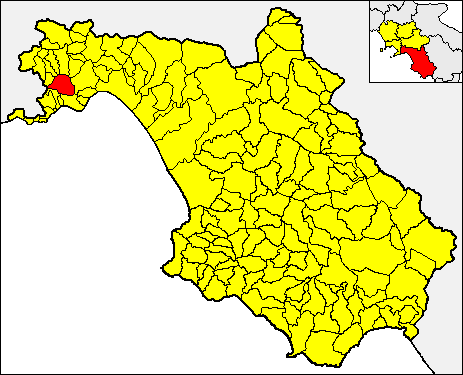
- Tramonti within the Province of Salerno

- Location within Italy Location within Campania
- Coordinates: 40°42′N 14°38′E
- Country: Italy
- Region: Campania
- Province: Salerno (SA)
- Frazioni: Campinola, Capitignano, Cesarano, Corsano, Figlino, Gete, Novella, Paterno Sant'Elia, Paterno Sant'Arcangelo, Pietre, Polvica, Ponte, Pucara

Government
  - Mayor: Antonio Giordano

Area
  - Total: 24 km^{2} (9.3 sq mi)
- Elevation: 321 m (1,053 ft)

Population (28 February 2017)
  - Total: 4,125
  - Density: 170/km^{2} (450/sq mi)
- Demonym: Tramontini
- Time zone: UTC+1 (CET)
  - Summer (DST): UTC+2 (CEST)
- Postal code: 84010
- Dialing code: 089
- Patron saint: St. Anthony of Padua
- Saint day: 13 June
- Website: Official website

UNESCO World Heritage Site
- Part of: Costiera Amalfitana
- Criteria: Cultural: (ii)(iv)
- Reference: 830
- Inscription: 1997 (21st Session)
- Area: 11,206 ha (27,690 acres)
- Buffer zone: 11,857 ha (29,300 acres)

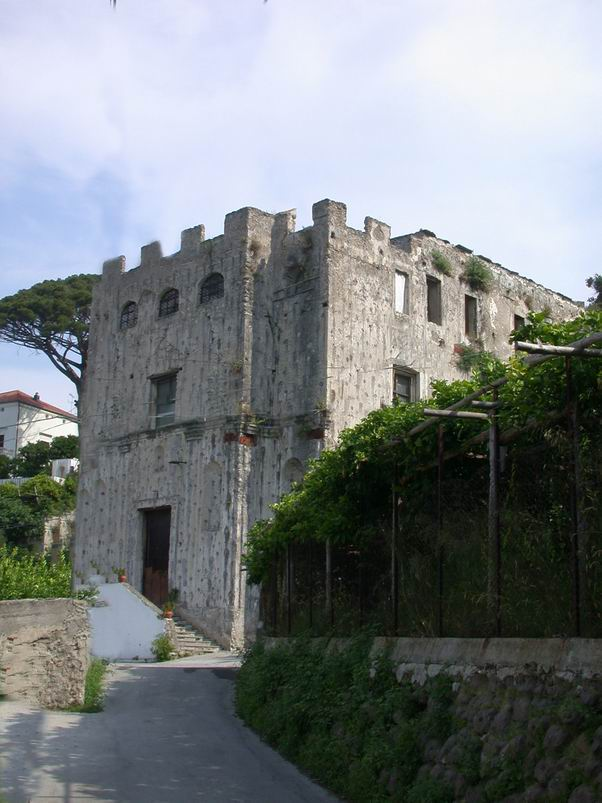
The conservatory of Pucara.

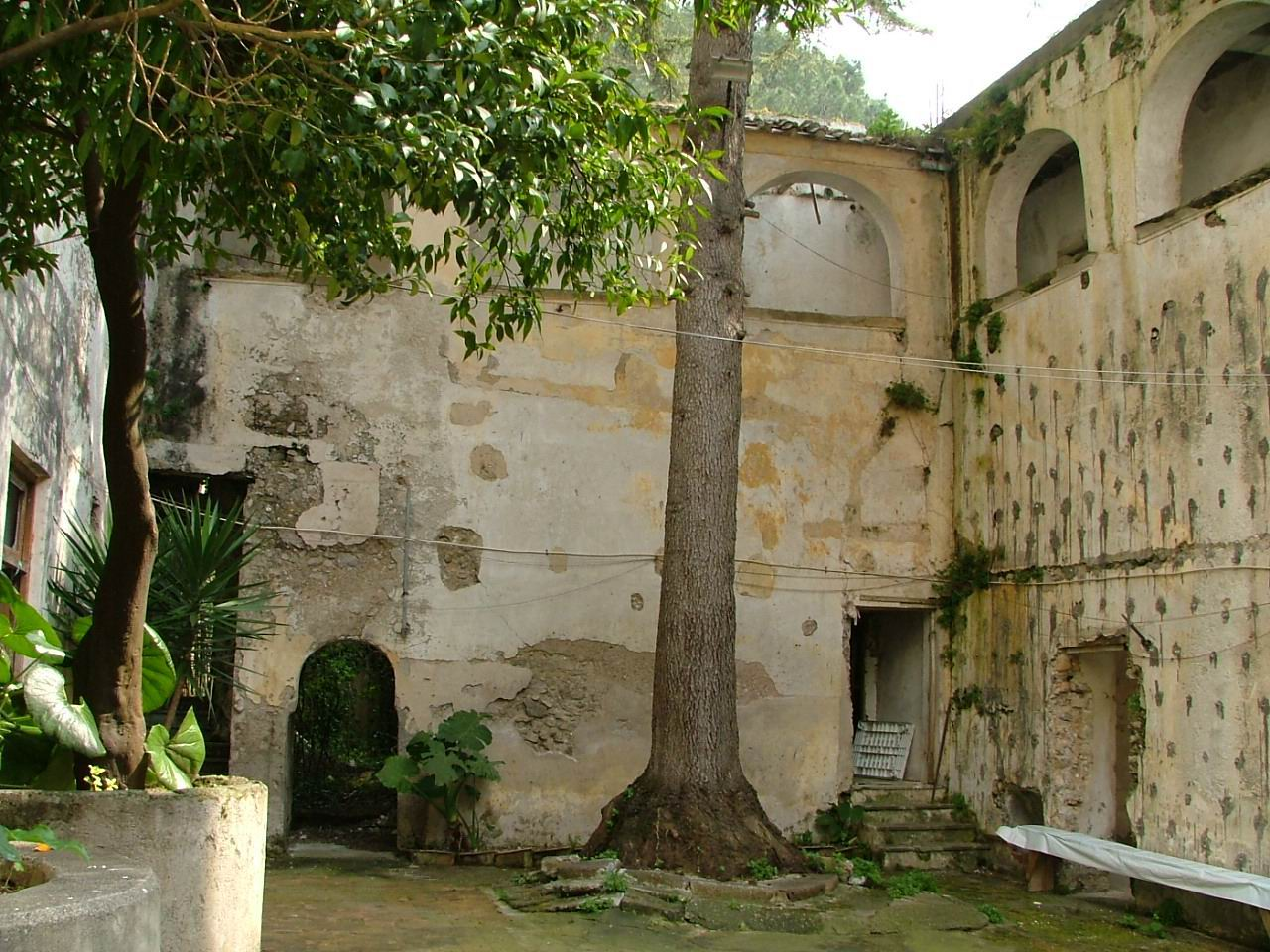
Cloister of the conservatory of Pucara.

Tramonti (Campanian: Tramunte) is a town and comune in the province of Salerno in the Campania region of south-western Italy. It is located in the territory of the Amalfi Coast.

== Geography ==
Tramonti, directly translatable as "in the mountains", is located along the Via Chiunzi which leads to Maiori and the Amalfi Coast. The town is bordered by Cava de' Tirreni, Corbara, Lettere, Maiori, Nocera Inferiore, Nocera Superiore, Pagani, Ravello and Sant'Egidio del Monte Albino.

== History ==
Tramonti was perhaps founded by the Romans. It was an important town of the Maritime Republic of Amalfi, an important trading power in the Mediterranean between 839 AD and around 1200 AD.

== Main sights ==
- Cappella Rupestre (Chapel in the Rock), in the village of Gete. A 13th century church in a slight hollow of the rock, housing tombs cut into the rocky side.
- Church of the Ascension
- Church of Sant'Elia (Church of St. Elia), in the village of Sant'Elia.
- Church of San Giovanni (Church of St. John), in the village of Polvica.
- Church of Pietro Apostolo (Church St. Peter Apostle), in the village of Figlino.
- Church of Sant'Erasmo
- Castle of Montalto and Hermitage of St. Catherine, at Paterno sant'Elia. It was built by the Republic of Amalfi on a cliff of the Monti Lattari to protect its territories from the northern side. It was stormed by the Normans in 1127 when the latter conquered the Republic.
- Castle of Santa Maria La Nova. It was built around 1457 by Raimondo Orsini, Prince of Salerno and overlord of the Duchy of Amalfi. A rectangular base was fortified by ten small square towers and seven ramparts, only some of which still stands.
- Convent of Saint Francis, founded in 1474.
- Monastery of St. Joseph and St. Teresa, built in 1662

== Economy ==
Vineyards, lemon orchards and chestnut woodlands are in abundance in this town.

== Twin towns ==
- Pézilla-la-Rivière, France, since 2001

== See also ==
- Amalfi Coast
- Chiunzi
- Sorrentine Peninsula
