= Nocera Inferiore =

Municipality in Campania, Italy

- Comune
- Comune di Nocera Inferiore
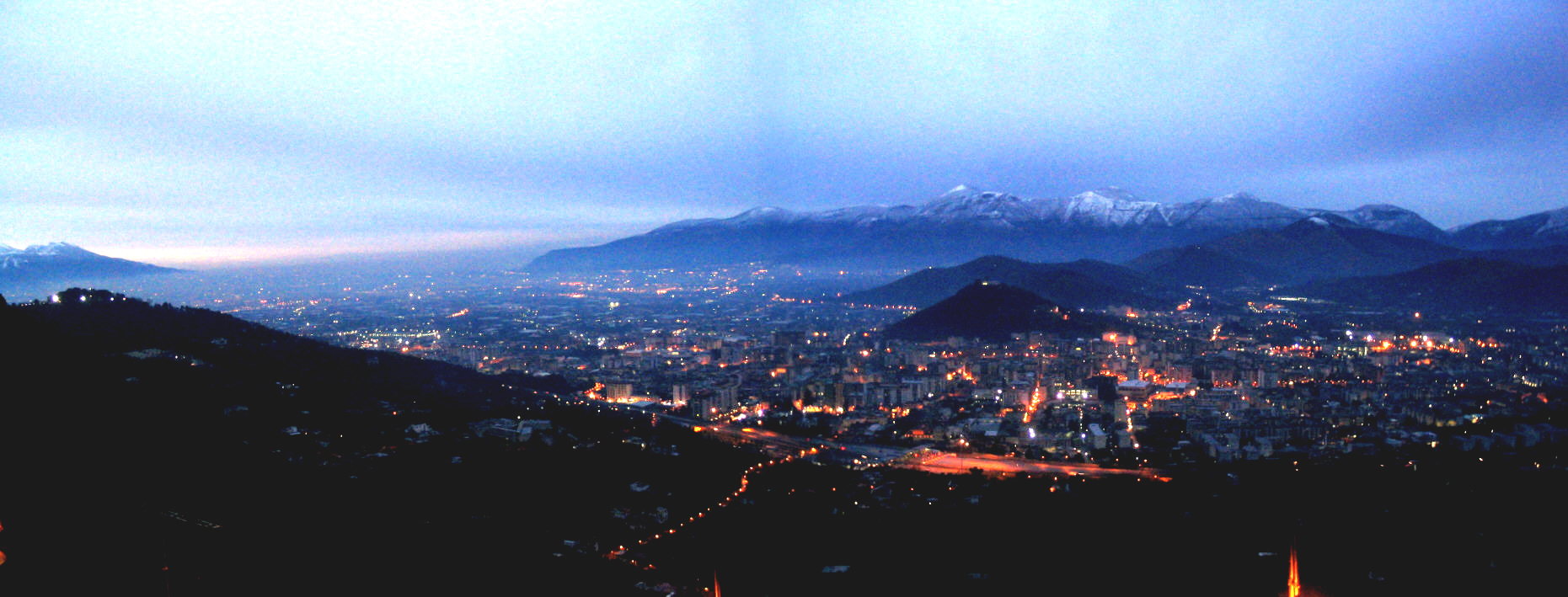

- Flag Coat of arms

- Location within Italy Location within Campania
- Coordinates: 40°45′N 14°38′E
- Country: Italy
- Region: Campania
- Province: Salerno (SA)
- Frazioni: Cicalesi, Merichi, Vescovado, Casolla, San Mauro

Government
  - Mayor: Paolo De Maio (D)

Area
  - Total: 20.94 km^{2} (8.08 sq mi)
- Elevation: 43 m (141 ft)

Population (1 January 2019)
  - Total: 45,608
  - Density: 2,178/km^{2} (5,641/sq mi)
- Demonym: Nocerini
- Time zone: UTC+1 (CET)
  - Summer (DST): UTC+2 (CEST)
- Postal code: 84014
- Dialing code: 081
- Patron saint: St. Priscus
- Saint day: May 9
- Website: Official website

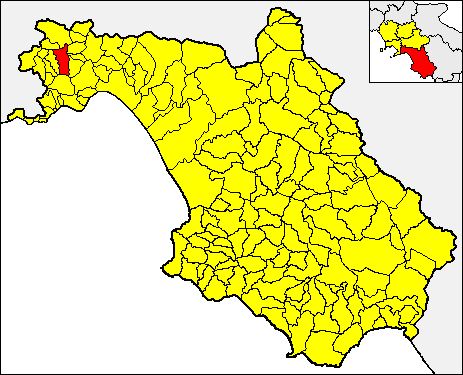
Locator map within the Province of Salerno

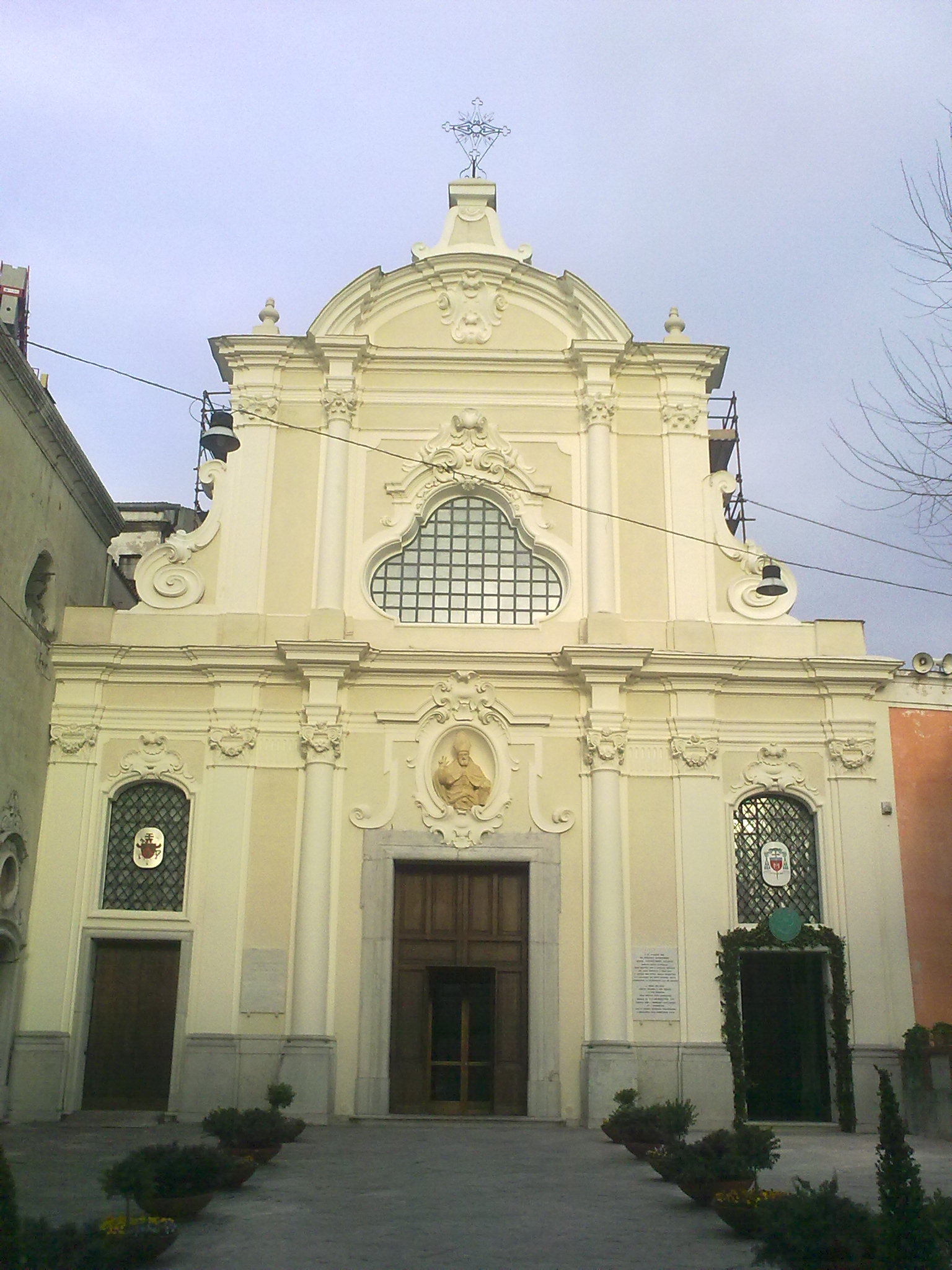
Cathedral-Basilica of Priscus of Nocera

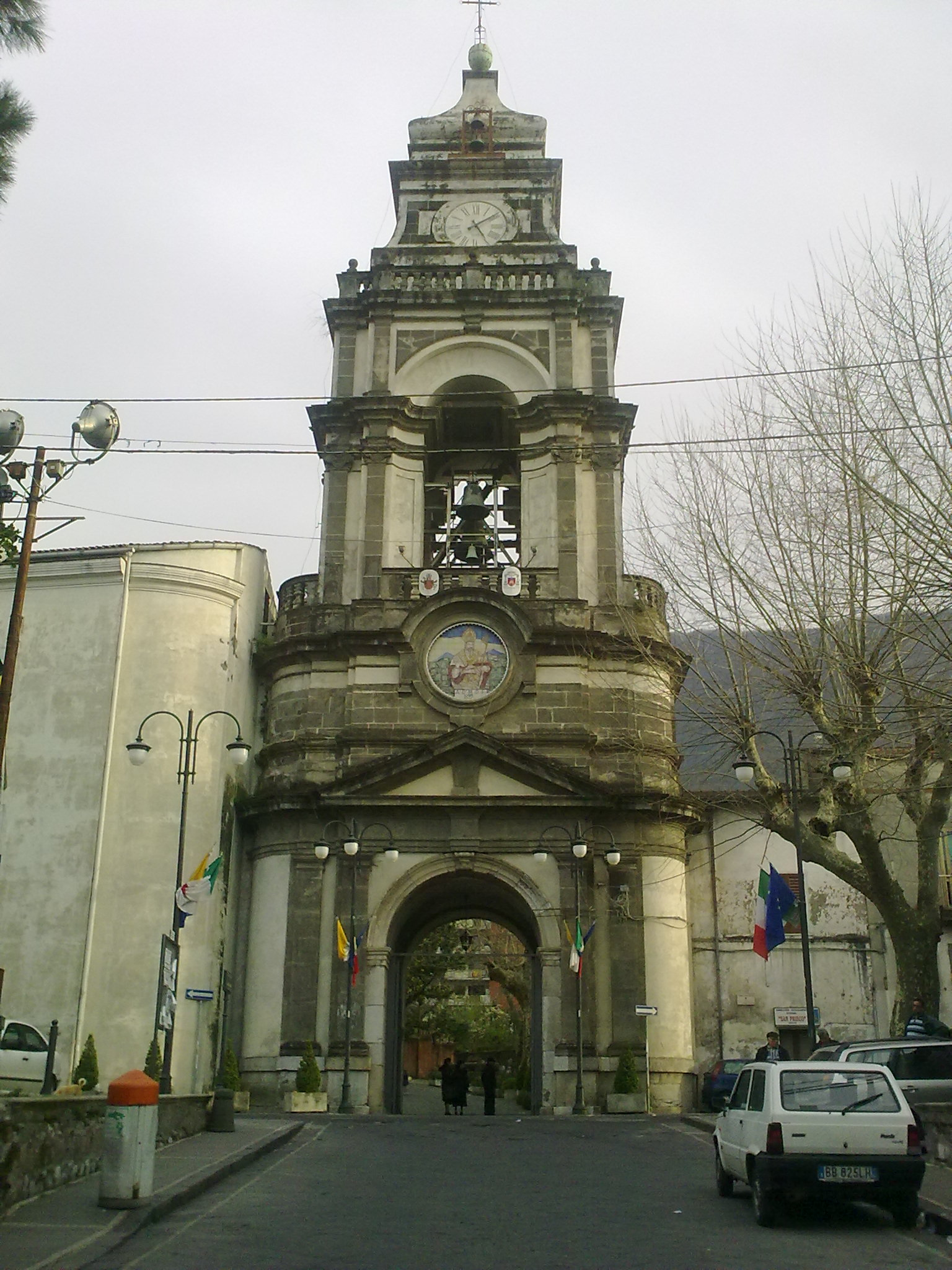
Cathedral bell tower, made by Francesco Solimena

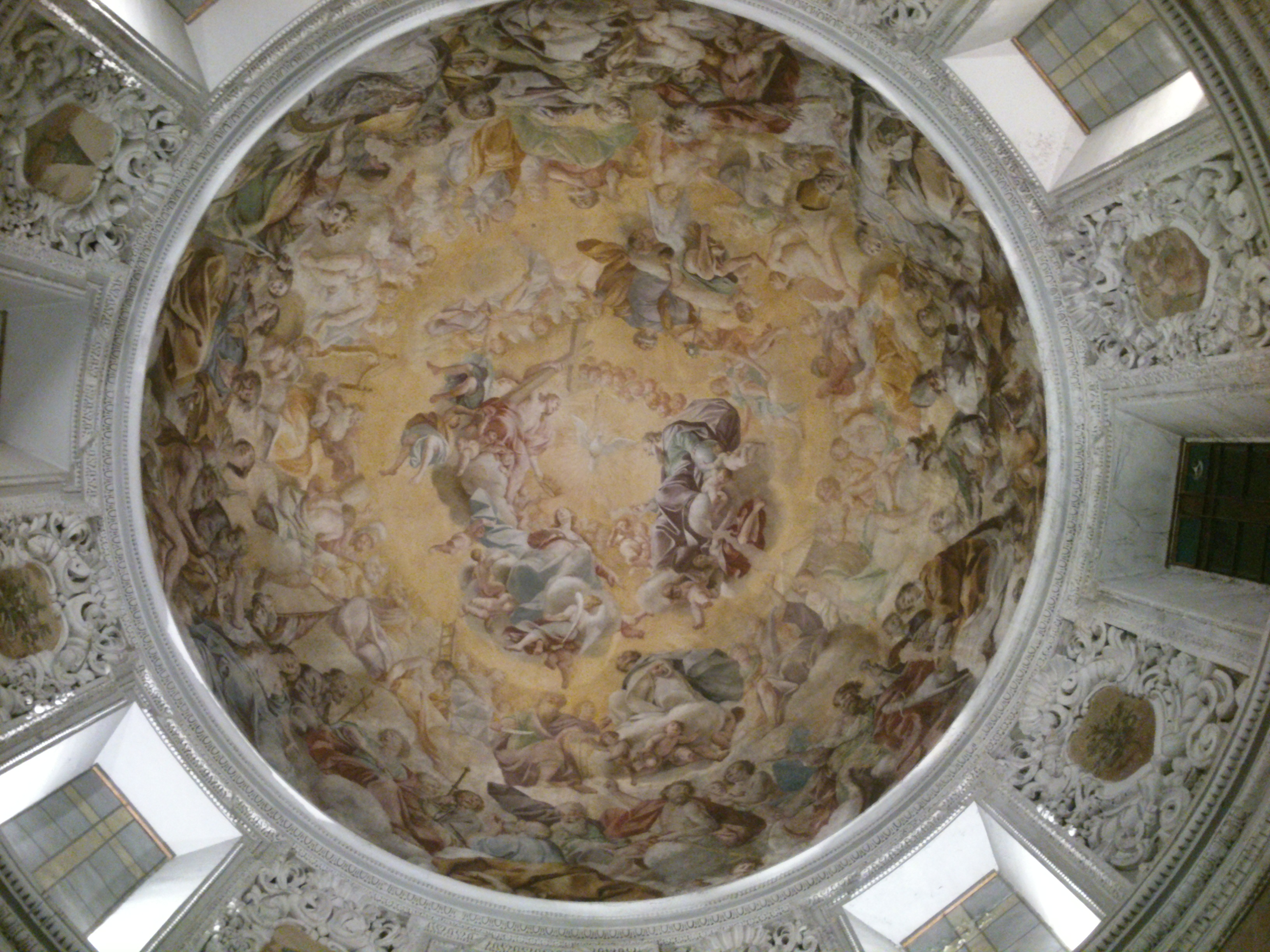
Cathedral dome Gloria del Paradiso

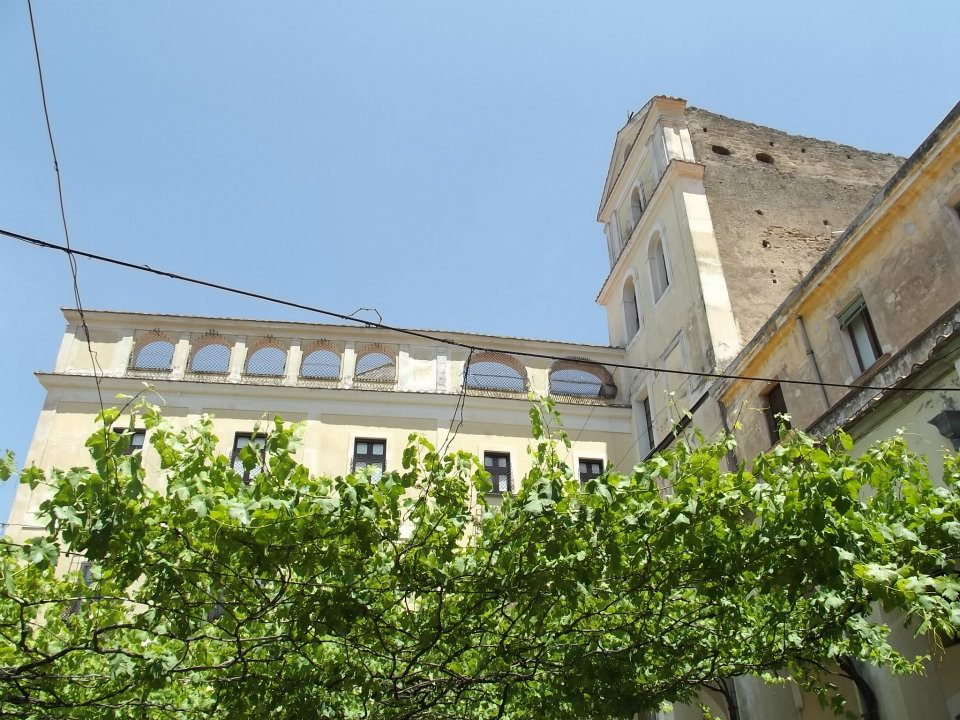
Il Monastery and Basilica of Sant'Anna

Gonfalon of the city

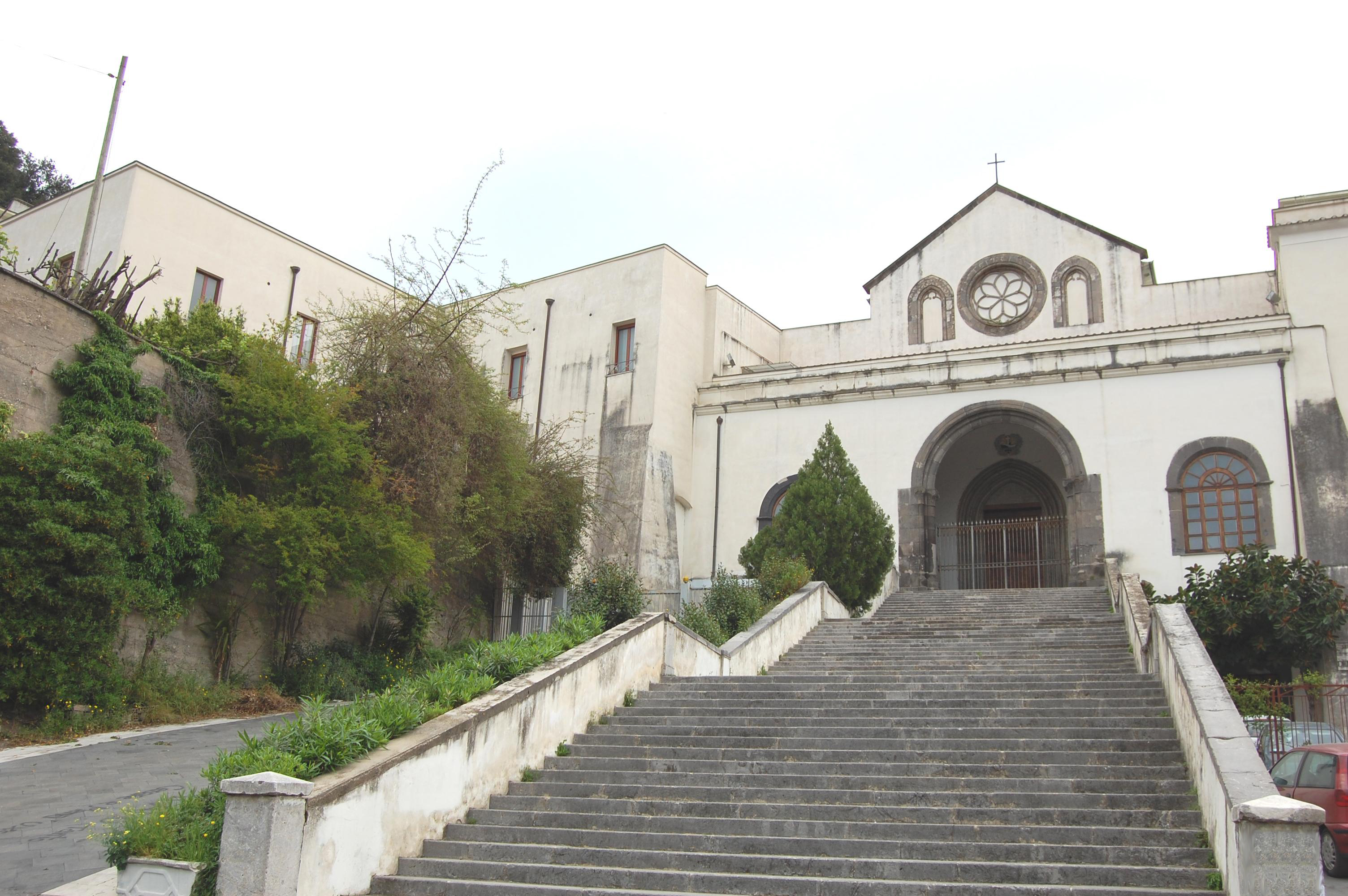
Basilica of Sant'Antonio

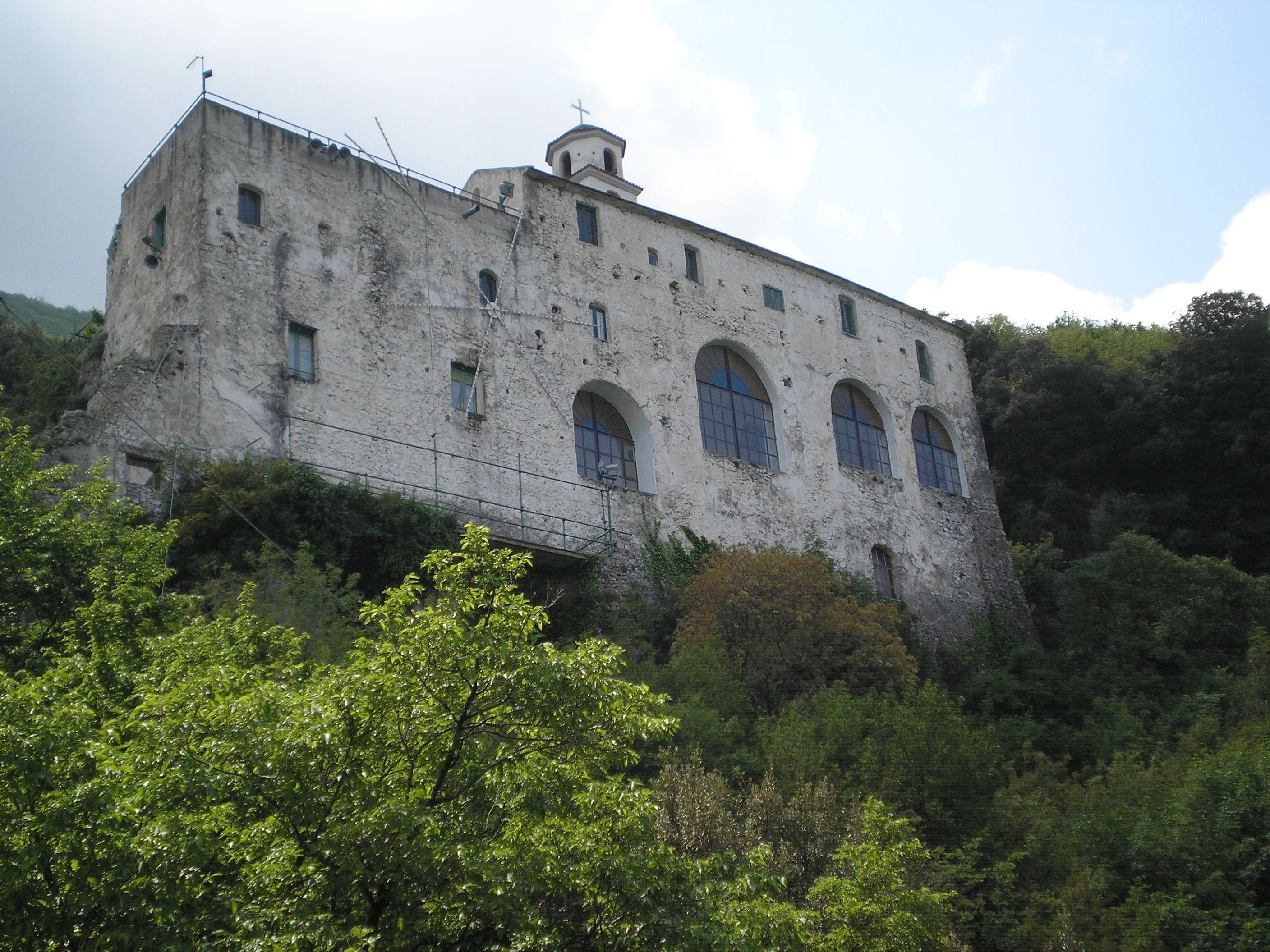
Il Sanctuary of Santa Maria dei Miracoli

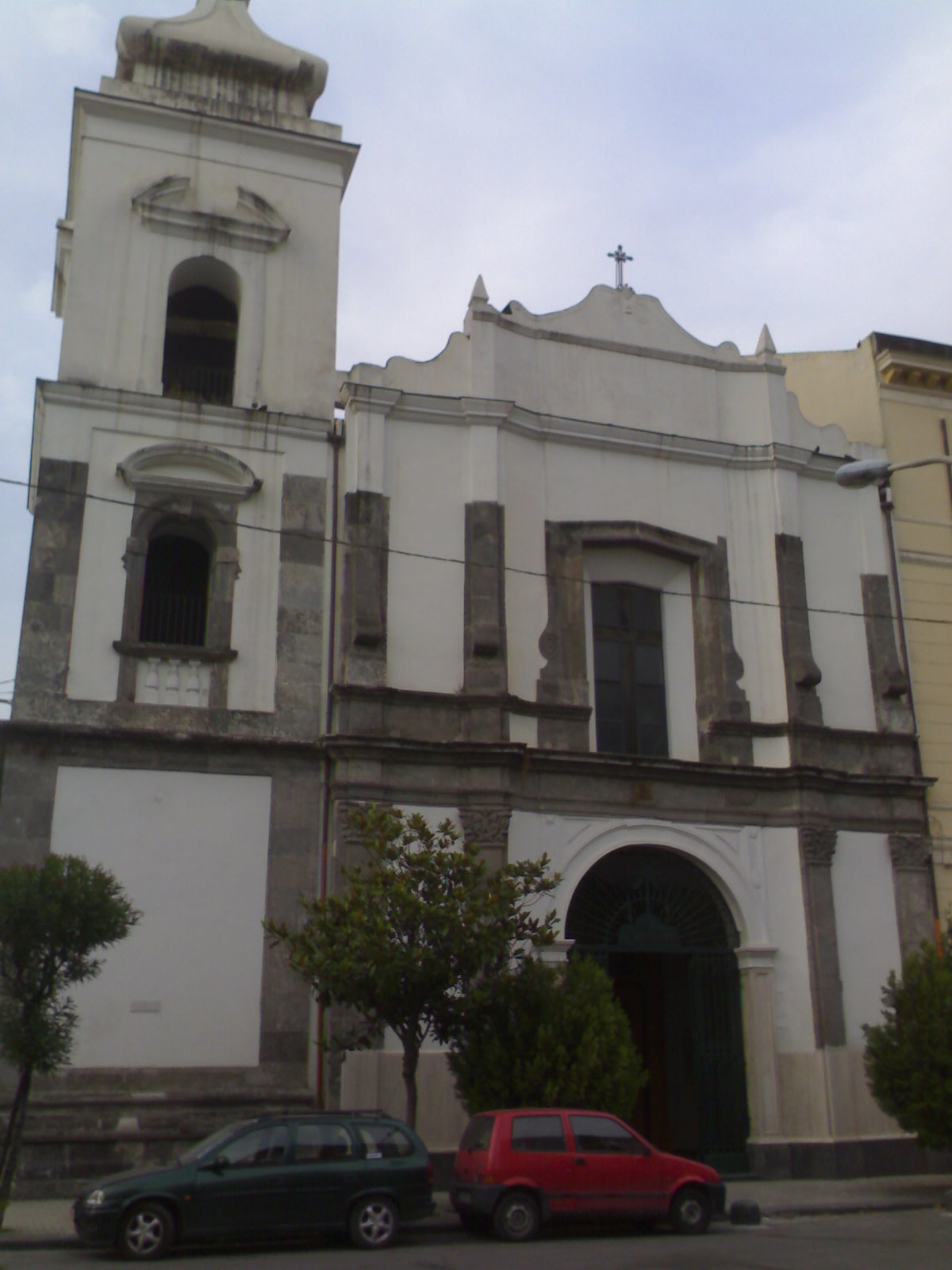
Church San Bartolomeo

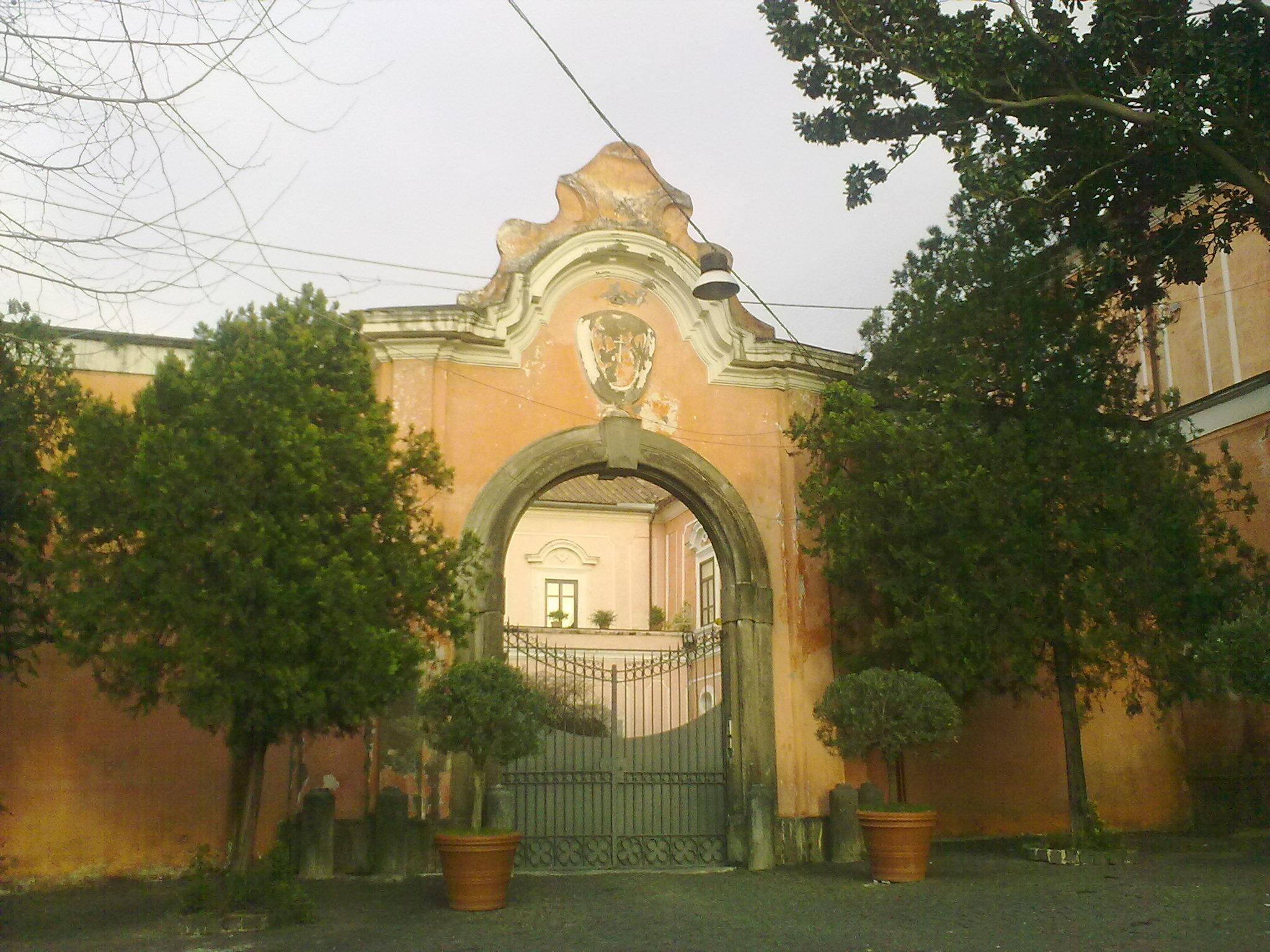
Palazzo vescovile

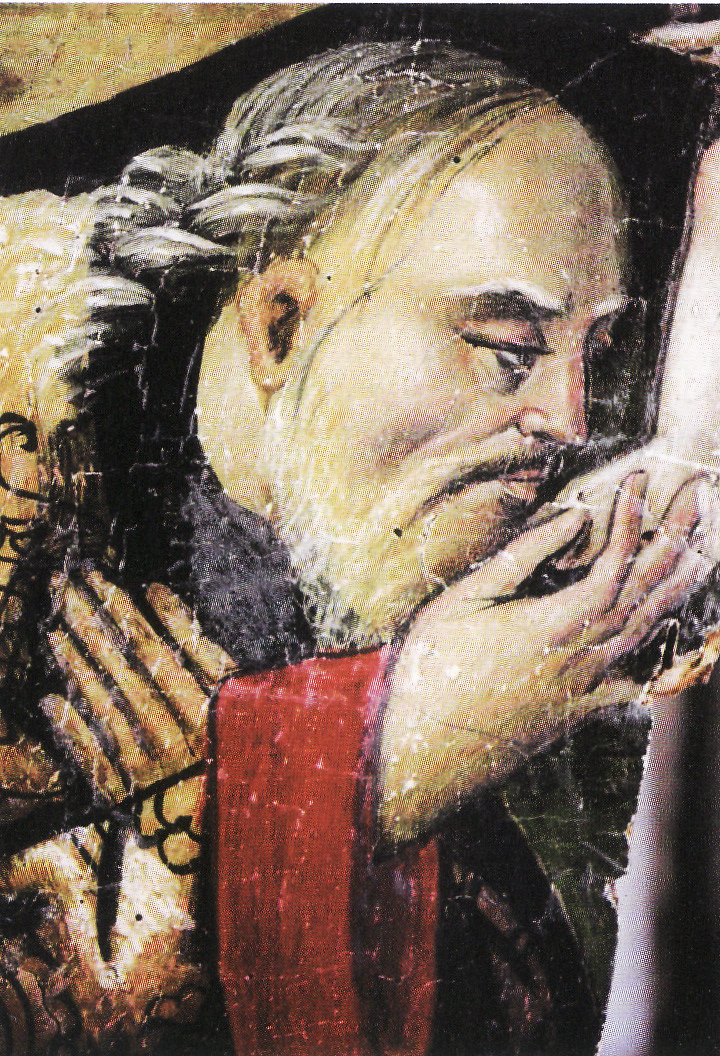
Adoration of the Magi, particular

Nocera Inferiore (Neapolitan: Nucèrä Inferiórë or simply Nucèrë, IPA: [nuˈ(t)ʃɛːrə], locally [nuˈ(t)ʃæːrə]) is a town and comune in the province of Salerno, in Campania in southern Italy. It lies west of Nocera Superiore, at the foot of Monte Albino, some 35 km east-southeast of Naples by rail.

== History ==
The ancient city of Nuceria Alfaterna was situated nearby in Nocera Superiore. Some of the city's necropoli were located in the area of Nocera Inferiore.

Its post-Roman history until 1851 is in common with Nocera Superiore.

=== Post-Roman history ===
At an early date, the city became an episcopal see named Nuceria Christianorum ('Nocera of the Christians'), and in the 12th century, it sided with Innocent II against Roger II of Sicily, suffering severely for its choice.

In the 13th century, and long after, the town had the name of Nocera dei Pagani ('Nocera of the pagans') because a colony of Muslim Saracens was introduced by Frederick II in the annexed territory of nowadays Pagani. The town was described as "a genuine Muhammadan town with all its characteristic mosques and minarets." It is said that, through their darker complexion and features, the townsfolk maintain the heritage of these Muslim settlers.

In 1385 Pope Urban VI was besieged in the castle by Charles III of Naples.

By the end of the 15th century, until 1806, Nuceria had the epithet ("of the pagans", Nuceria Paganorum); the town was then divided into 7 boroughs, that later became 5 separate comuni: Nocera Inferiore, Nocera Superiore, Pagani, Sant'Egidio and Corbara. Today the town of Pagani lies about one 1.5 km to the west.

== The origins of the name ==
The current name, Nocera Inferiore, derives from the Italianization of the dialectal toponym Nuceria and from the geographical position of the city that, in 1806, was born from the division of Nocera dei Pagani, sanctioning the birth of five municipalities, including the two Noceras, differentiated according to their height above sea level.

== Main sights ==
One of the most beautiful places to visit in Nocera Inferiore is the medieval castle. Strategically located on the top of Santa Andrea's hill, this fortified structure was founded in the 9th century. In 1138 it was destroyed by the troops of Ruggero II. Helena, the widow of Manfred of Sicily, was imprisoned in the Castle and died here after the battle of Benevento (1268). Here also Urban VI imprisoned the cardinals who favoured the Antipope Clement VII.

The castle also had as guests the writers Dante Alighieri and Boccaccio.

== Symbols ==
The city coat of arms shows a walnut tree with golden fruits. On the red frame of the shield is written "Urbs Nuceria" in Roman letters. On the top there is a castellated crown, whereas at the bottom there is a laurel branch with golden berries and an oak branch with golden acorns tied together with the Italian tricolour ribbon. The city coat of arms has been renewed recently by Antonio Pecoraro.

Since 2017 "Verrà dalla memoria" has been the anthemn of Nocera Inferiore. Lyrics were written by Teresa Staiano and music was composed by Father Carmine Ferraioli.

== Monuments ==
=== Churches ===
- Cathedral of San Prisco and San Marco (10th century)
- Church of San Matteo (10th century)
- Convent of San Giovanni in Parco (12th century)
- Church of Sant'Angelo in grotta (12th century)
- Monastery of Santa Chiara (13th century)
- Convent of Sant'Antonio (13th century)
- Convent of Sant'Anna (13th century)
- Church of the Corpo di Cristo (16th century)
- Convent of Sant'Andrea (16th century)
- Sanctuary of Santa Maria dei Miracoli (16th century)
- Church of San Bartolomeo (18th century)
- Church of San Giuseppe (20th century)

=== Castle ===
- Castello del Parco (10th century)

=== Buildings ===
- Torre Guerritore (19th century)
- Palazzo Vescovile (16th century)
- Curia diocesana (18th century)
- Palazzo ducale (16th century)
- Caserma Bruno Tofano (18th century)
- Palazzo Lanzara (17th century)
- Palazzo del Liceo Classico (20th century)
- Villa Piccolomini d'Aragona (20th century)

=== Museums ===
- Art gallery of Sant'Antonio convent
- Diocesan Museum San Prisco
- Archaeology museums of Agro nocerino

== Notable people ==
- Publius Sittius
- Felix and Constantia
- Antipope Laurentius
- Beatrice of Provence
- Helena Angelina Doukaina
- Charles Martel of Anjou
- San Ludovico D'Angiò, canonized on April 7, 1317 by John XXII
- Dietrich of Nieheim
- Pope Urban VI
- Raimondo Del Balzo Orsini
- Jacopo Sannazzaro, famous poet, humanist, and epigrammist
- Nunzio Ferraiuoli, famous painter
- Paolo Giovio
- Bernardino Telesio
- Orazio Solimena, famous painter
- Angelo Solimena, famous painter
- Francesco Solimena, famous painter in the Baroque era
- Carlo Cafiero
- Giuseppe Fanelli
- Warren Cuccurullo
- Mario Cuomo, whose father Andrea came from Nocera Inferiore
- Pat Villani
- Mino Raiola, football agent
- Giammario Piscitella
- Lorenzo Prisco, footballer
- Michele Tarallo
- Simone Barone, World Cup-winning footballer
- Raffaele De Martino, footballer
- Teresa Di Loreto
- Isabella Adinolfi
- Coez
- Zak Chelli

== Twin towns/cities ==
Nocera inferiore is twinned with:

- Makarska, Croatia

== Transportation ==
Nocera is connected with Naples, Avellino and Salerno by a branch railway.

== See also ==
- Diocese of Nocera Inferiore-Sarno
- Alphabet of Nuceria
- A.S.G. Nocerina
- History of Islam in southern Italy
- Saracinesco
- Ciciliano
