= Di Loreto =

Di Loreto is a surname of Italian origin. Notable people with this surname include:

- Dante Di Loreto, American film and television producer
- Marco Di Loreto (born 1974), Italian former footballer turned manager
- Teresa Di Loreto (born 1989), Italian long jumper
