= Chiunzi =

Mountain in Italy

Coordinates: 40°25′51″N 14°22′15″E

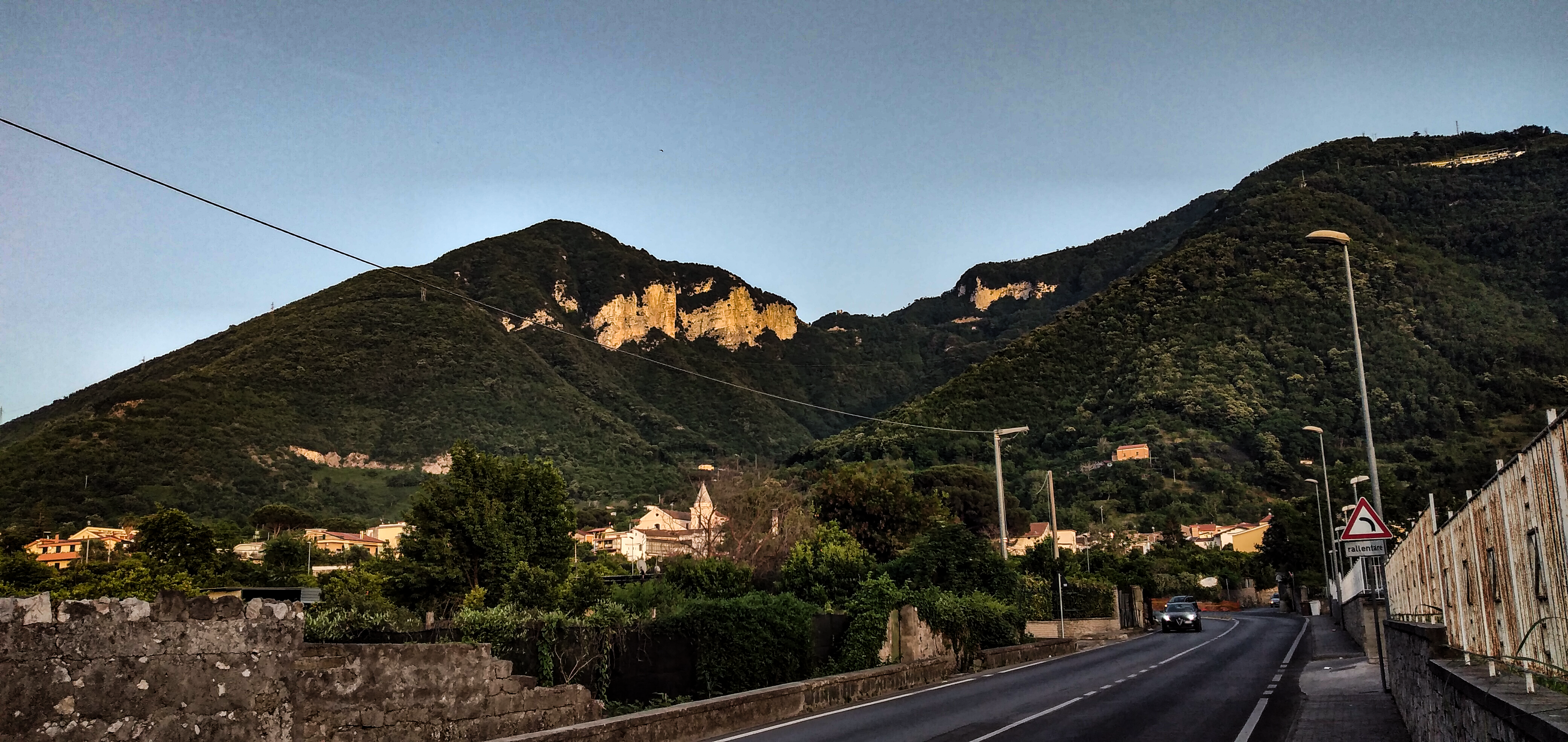

Highest point
- Elevation: 880 m (2,890 ft)

Geography
- Location: Campania, Italy

Chiunzi is a mountain pass in Campania, Italy. It connects the Agro Nocerino Sarnese with the Amalfi coast through the municipalities of Sant'Egidio del Monte Albino and Tramonti. It is situated between the municipalities of Tramonti and Corbara, in the Province of Salerno. It is known for its dramatic belvedere (overlook).
