= Alfaterni =

Ancient Italic people

The Alfaterni were possibly an ancient Italic people that, according to the 1st-century CE Roman historian Pliny the Elder, inhabited Campania. The city of Nuceria was associated with the Alfaterni, with the Oscan words Nuvkrinum Alafaternum appearing on one coin from the area. Etymologically, the term Alafaternum may connect to Latin albus ("white") and thus derive from Proto-Italic *alβos.

== Meaning of the term ==
It is possible that the ethnic epithet of the Alfaterni was applied to the city of Nuceria so as to distinguish the settlement from Nuceria Camellaria and Nuceria Favoniensis, both of which were located in Umbria. Within this context, the term Alfaterna appears not necessarily as an ethnic identifier, but as an adjective utilized to describe a town. Otherwise, in Latin and Greek literature, the term Alfaterna appears as a specific descriptive marker applied to the town of Nuceria. Diodorus Siculus, a 1st-century BCE Greek historian, records that Nuceria Alafterni had broken their alliance with the Romans and instead joined with the Samnites, who were already embroiled in the Samnite Wars.

== Historical context ==
According to the classicist Edward Togo Salmon, the act of signing a treaty with the Samnites league implies that, though willing to ally with the coalition, the Alfaterni were not officially members. Later, in 308 BCE, during the Second Samnite War, the Roman general Quintus Fabius Maximus Rullianus conquered the city of Nuceria Alfaterna.

Pliny writes that there were three subgroups of this people—one who took their cognomen from the Latin territory, one from the Hernican, and one from the Labican. The interpretation of this passage is unclear, though it may imply the existence of additional settlements also designated with the adjective Alfaterna, yet no such towns are known from the archaeological or literary record. In the Periplus of Pseudo-Scylax, there is recorded a dialect group of the Osci that is named the λατέρνιοι ("latérnioi"), a term that may be emended to Αλφατέρνιοι ("Alphatérnioi") and thus connected with the Alfaterni people.

== See also ==
- Nocera Superiore
