= Nocera dei Pagani =

Ancient city in southern Italy

- Comune
- Nuceria Paganorum
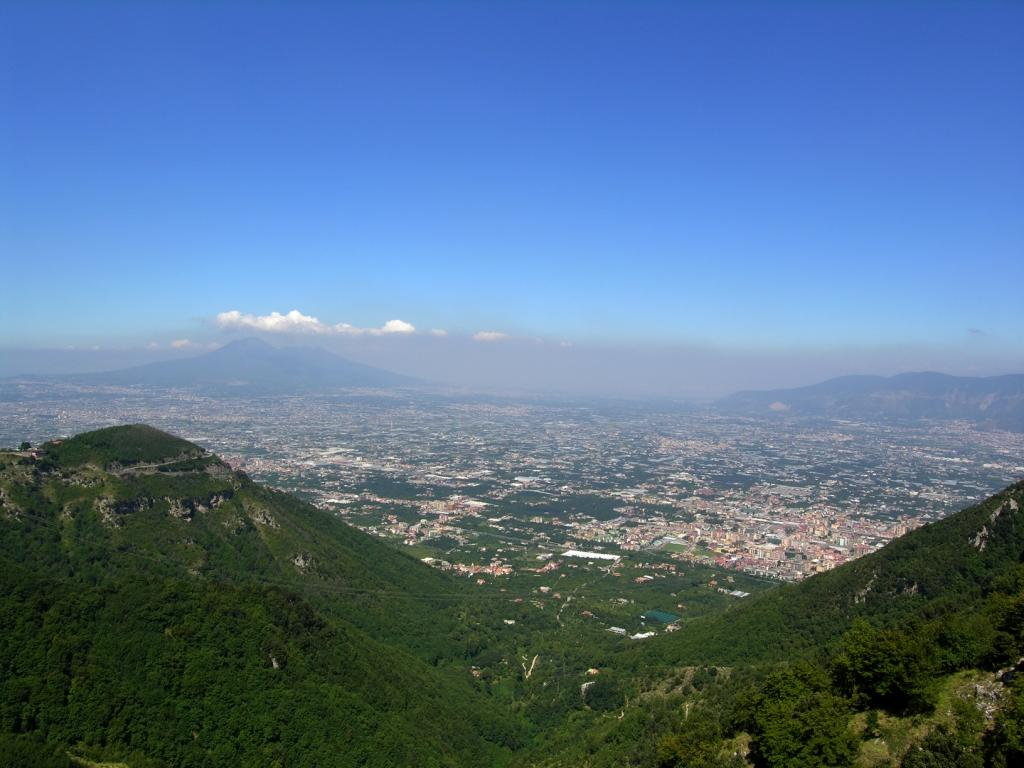
- Views of Nocera dei Pagani.

- Locator map of Nocera dei Pagani within Campania

- Location within Italy Location within Campania
- Coordinates: 40°44′N 14°37′E
- Country: Italy
- Region: Campania
- Province: Province of Salerno

Area
  - Total: 62 km^{2} (24 sq mi)
- Demonym: Nucerian (Note: See Nucerian alphabet.)
- Time zone: UTC+1 (CET)
  - Summer (DST): UTC+2 (CEST)
- Postal code: 84010; 84014 to 84016
- Patron saint: St. Alphonse
- Saint day: 1 August

Nocera dei Pagani (Note: Often shortened as Nocera de' Pagani.) (Latin: Nuceria Paganorum), as it was known between the 16th century and 1806, was a civitas that included a large portion of the Agro nocerino-sarnese, corresponding to five contemporary municipalities: Nocera Inferiore, Nocera Superiore, Pagani, Sant'Egidio del Monte Albino and Corbara.

== History ==
=== Nuceria ===
In the period before the Roman supremacy in southern Italy, the whole territory was known as Nuceria, the chief town in the Sarnus valley – Herculaneum, Pompeii, Stabiae and Surrentum all being dependent upon it, according to many archaeologists. It maintained its allegiance to Rome until 309 BC, when it joined the Samnites in revolt. In 308 BC it repulsed a Roman attempt to land at the mouth of the Sarnus, but in 307 BC it was besieged and surrendered. It obtained favourable terms, and remained faithful to Rome even after the Battle of Cannae.

In 216 BC Hannibal weakened the town by starvation, then destroyed it. The inhabitants returned when peace was restored. During the Social War, it remained loyal to Rome. In 73 BC it was plundered by Spartacus.

=== Saracen colony ===
In the Middle Ages (around the 9th century) a small colony of Saracens was introduced in the annexed territory of modern-day Pagani by permission of the Dukes of Naples; according to most sources, it lasted only a few decades, but other sources state that a second colony of Muslim Saracens was later introduced by Frederick II. The town was described as "a genuine Muhammadan town with all its characteristic mosques and minarets." It is said that, through their darker complexion and features, the townsfolk maintain the heritage of these Muslim settlers.

After the mid-9th century the town was part of the principality of Salerno first, and then of the principality of Capua.

=== Pagano family ===
The House of Pagano, an ancient noble family of local lords living in the castle of Cortimpiano (Latin: Curtis in Plano), in the territory of Pagani, apparently took this surname from the Saracens (referred to as "pagans") who previously inhabited the area.

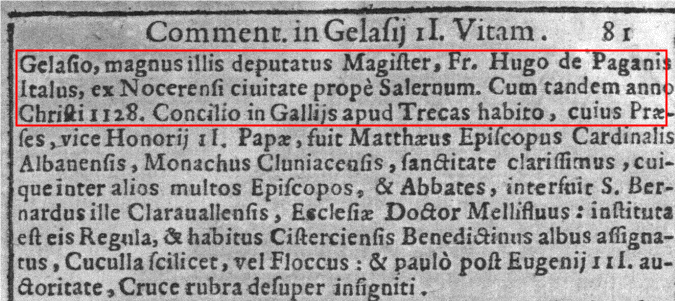
[...] the Italian brother Ugo dei Pagani, from the city of Nocera, near Salerno. — Life of Pope Gelasius II Commentaries on the life of Gelasius II, pontiff between 1118 and 1119.

A family member named Ugo dei Pagani (Latin: Hugo de Paganis) is credited as a crusader knight and founder of the Knights Templar. Reference to Nocera as his birthplace is found in the works of Filiberto Campanile (1610), Antonino Amico (1636), Costantino Gaetani (1638), Blaise François de Pagan (1669), Pierre Dupuy (1654), and Bernardo Giustinian (1692), among others. (Note: Circumstantial confirmations came from authors like Carlo Sigonio (1574), Heinrich Pantaleon (1581), Scipione Mazzella (1588), Marco Antonio Guarini (1621), Frans Mennens (1623), and Johann Jacob Hofmann (1698).) Mentions of Nocera as his birthplace also appear in Baedeker's Italy: handbook for travellers. Part 3 (1869) and in the Old Catholic Encyclopedia (Volume 11) published by Robert Appleton Company in 1911. Multiple authors have stated that this claim is also supported by a letter Hugo supposedly wrote from Palestine in 1103, in which he talked of writing to "my father in Nocera" to tell him of the death of his cousin Alessandro. In addition, the Templar cross appears to have been inspired by Paleochristian art found in the Early Christian Baptistery of Nocera.

=== Second millennium ===
The citadel of Nuceria, located where the future Nocera Inferiore would rise, was besieged by Roger II of Sicily in the battle in 1132. After four months he razed the town to the ground. After its reconstruction, the birth of the modern Nocera began with many hamlets and villages which gradually expanded and became small towns.

During the Angevin dominion (1266–1435) Nocera was rebuilt and took the name of Nuceria Christianorum (Italian: Nocera dei Cristiani, lit. 'Nocera of the Christians'). In 1385 Pope Urban VI was besieged in the city castle by Charles III of Naples.

In the 15th century the town name was changed to Nuceria Paganorum (Italian: Nocera dei Pagani, lit. 'Nocera of the Pagans') in honor of the Pagano family, itself named after the Saracen pagans who previously inhabited the area. Throughout the Spanish domination, the town was subdivided into two departments (Nocera Soprana and Nocera Sottana), each one composed of multiple municipalities.

Every year in August, the male adults of each municipality gathered in public assembly to elect their particular mayor; then – in a different assembly – each department elected the universal mayors: two for Nocera Soprana and one for Nocera Sottana, which together led Nocera dei Pagani as a triumvirate.

Department	Municipality	Territory
Nocera Soprana	Nocera Corpo	Nocera Superiore; Nocera Inferiore (Note: Districts of Piedimonte, Pietraccetta and Borgo.)
Nocera Soprana	San Matteo (Note: Tre Casali was autonomous from the 1500s to the 1700s, then merged into the municipality of San Matteo, forming San Matteo Tre Casali.)	Nocera Inferiore (Note: Districts of San Matteo, Merichi and Liporta.)
Nocera Soprana	Tre Casali	Nocera Inferiore (Note: Districts of Capo Casale, Casale Nuovo and Casale del Pozzo.)
Nocera Soprana	Sperandei	Nocera Inferiore
Nocera Soprana	Pucciano (Note: Formerly part of Nocera Corpo, Pucciano was autonomous from 1570 to 1580, then merged back into the municipality of Nocera Corpo.)	Nocera Superiore
Nocera Sottana	Barbazzano	Pagani
Nocera Sottana	Pagani	Pagani
Nocera Sottana	Sant'Egidio	Sant'Egidio del Monte Albino
Nocera Sottana	Corbara	Corbara

The town survived until 1806. In 1807 five comuni were established: Barbazzano merged into the comune of Pagani; Sperandei merged into San Matteo Tre Casali, forming the comune of Nocera San Matteo; while Nocera Corpo, Sant'Egidio and Corbara stayed autonomous. In 1834, the remnants of Nocera Soprana (Nocera Corpo and Nocera San Matteo) merged back into a single comune, but fourteen districts of Nocera Corpo (including Pucciano) later asked for self-administration, which was granted by decree No. 1960 on 11 November 1850, with effect from 1 January 1851; thus were born the contemporary comuni of Nocera Superiore (corresponding to most of Nocera Corpo) and Nocera Inferiore (formerly Nocera San Matteo).

== See also ==
- History of Islam in southern Italy
- Diocese of Nocera dei Pagani
- Nucerian alphabet
- Pagani, Campania
- Ugo dei Pagani
