= Felix and Constantia =

Saints Felix and Constantia

Martyrs
- Born: 1st century AD; Nuceria Alfaterna, Campania, Italy
- Died: September 19, 68 AD; Nuceria Alfaterna, Campania, Italy
- Venerated in: Roman Catholic Church
- Canonized: Pre-Congregation
- Feast: September 22

Saints Felix and Constanza were a brother and sister from the Roman city of Nuceria Alfaterna, and were martyred by the emperor Nero in 68 AD (September 19, tradition says).
