= Nocera Superiore =

- Comune
- Comune di Nocera Superiore
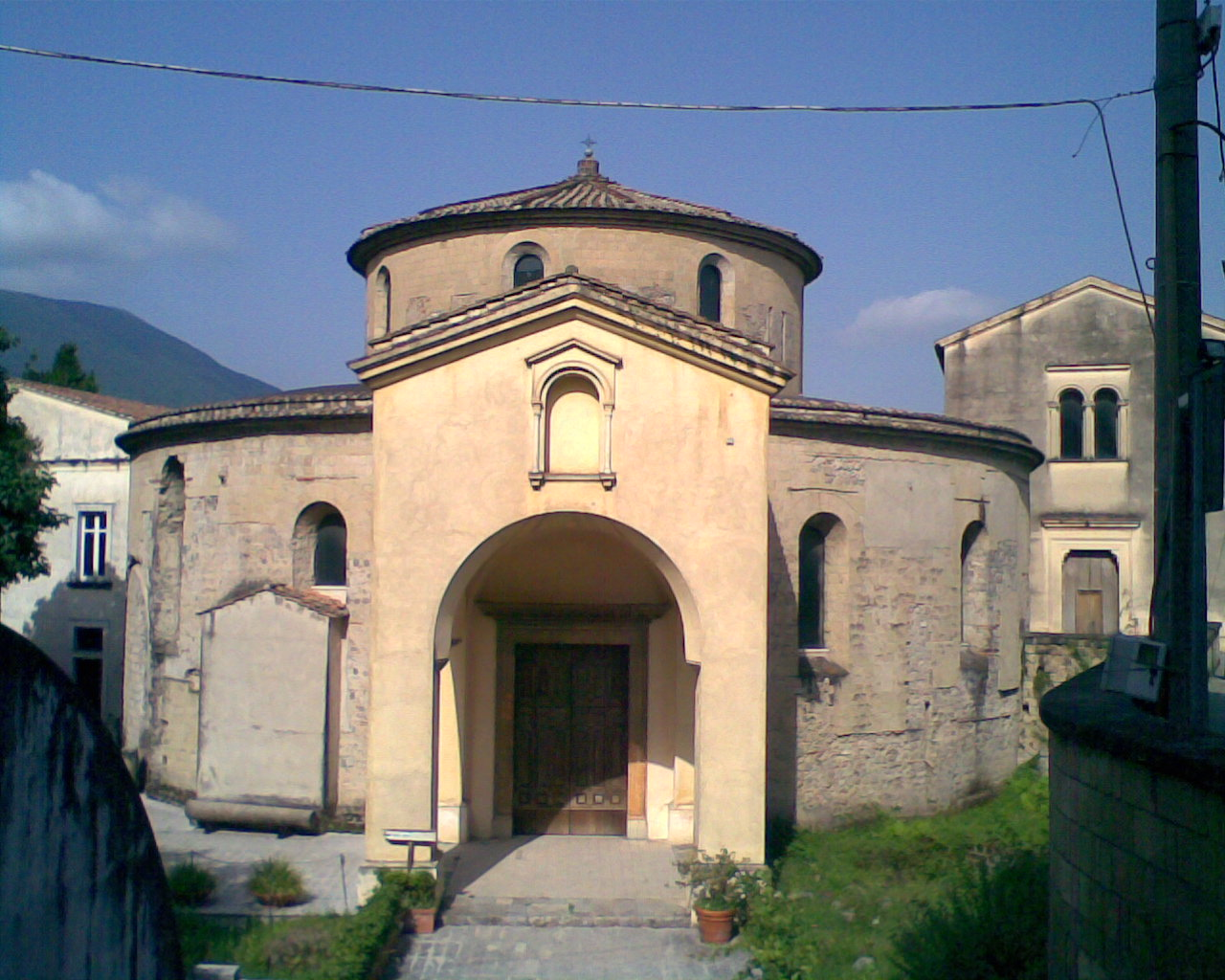
- Palaeochristian Baptistery of Santa Maria Maggiore

- Coat of arms

- Location within Italy Location within Campania
- Coordinates: 40°44′N 14°40′E
- Country: Italy
- Region: Campania
- Province: Salerno (SA)
- Frazioni: Croce Malloni, Materdomini, Pecorari, Uscioli, Camerelle, Pizzone, Casa Milite, Citola, Porta Romana, Pareti, Pucciano, San Clemente, San Pietro, Starza, Taverne

Government
  - Mayor: Gennaro D'Acunzi

Area
  - Total: 14.66 km^{2} (5.66 sq mi)
- Elevation: 70 m (230 ft)

Population (30 November 2017)
  - Total: 24,390
  - Density: 1,664/km^{2} (4,309/sq mi)
- Demonym: Nocerini
- Time zone: UTC+1 (CET)
  - Summer (DST): UTC+2 (CEST)
- Postal code: 84015
- Dialing code: 081
- Patron saint: St. Cyrus
- Saint day: 31 January

Nocera Superiore (Neapolitan: Nucèrë or Nucèrä Superiórë) is a town and comune in the province of Salerno in the Campania region of south-western Italy.

It was the core of the ancient city of Nuceria Alfaterna, later known as Nuceria Constantia, Nuceria Christianorum and then Nuceria Paganorum (Italian: Nocera dei Pagani), which also included the nowadays territories of Nocera Inferiore, Pagani and smaller towns.

In other respects, its history up until 1851 is held in common with the adjacent Nocera Inferiore: the two towns share a common origin.

== Geography ==
The town is located on the northern ridge of the Monti Lattari, in the Agro Nocerino Sarnese.

Its seismic hazard rating puts it in zone 2 (medium hazard level), according to Ordinance PCM n. 3274 of 20 March 2003.

== Etymology ==
According to legend, an Etruscan princess escaped from her hometown for love and came to die in these areas. In her memory, her father erected a city, giving it her name, Nuceria. Another legend tells that a great flood swept away an entire forest leaving a single walnut tree (from the Latin nux, nucis – Nuceria).

The name's origins were uncovered through the study of inscriptions on the city's coins which stated Nuvkrinum Alafaternum. Analysing these two words, linguists have split the terms in this way:

The name Nuvkrinum Alafaternum is derived from nuv + krin-um + alafatern-um: nuv ('new'), krin ('fortress') of the Alfaterni, an Italic people of the Agro Nocerino Sarnese.

== History ==
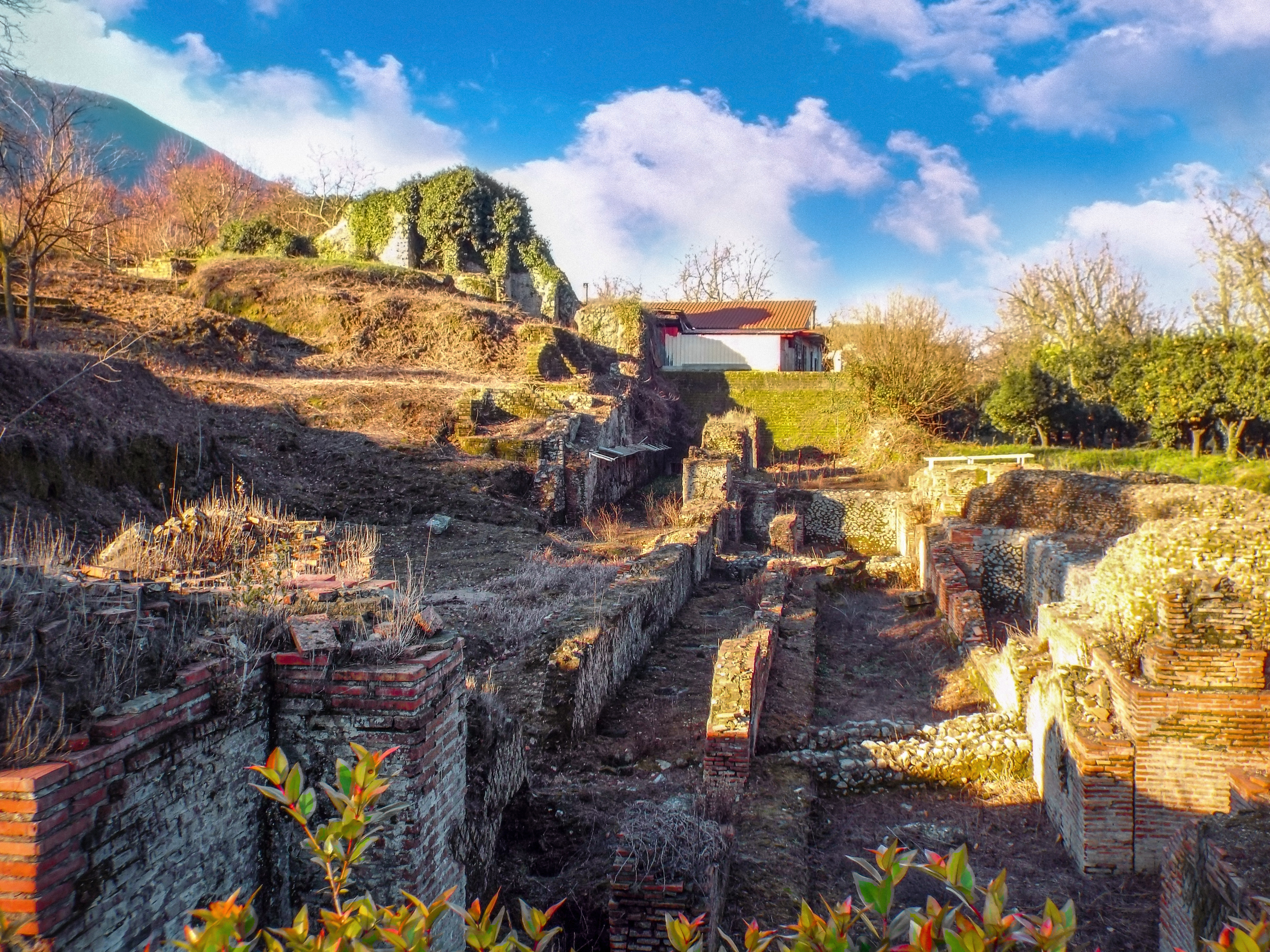
Ruins of the theatre built in the 2nd century BC by the Romans

=== Pre-Roman ===
Archaeological evidence from the necropoli shows that at the end of the 7th century BC the native Oscan populations of the valley went to settle towards the sea for mainly strategic reasons, some founding Pompeii, others towards the interior, giving life to Nuvkrinum. The city was founded by the union of several scattered villages, colonising a strategic well-defended place guarding a fertile valley and a route between the gulfs of Naples and Salerno. It was centred on the suburb of Pareti.

It became an Etruscan settlement and possibly part of the dodecapolis (the twelve most important cities) of the Etruscan colonisation in Campania to block the Greek expansion towards the north.

After the defeat of 474 BC at the Battle of Cumae the Etruscans abandoned the region and Nuvkrinum passed to the Samnites. In the 5th century BC the city changed its name by adding Alfaternum from the name of the Samnite tribe of the Alfaterni.

Around the 6th century BC the Osci, an Italic people of Campania, probably gave rise to the original settlement of Nuceria Alfaterna, located in Nocera Superiore, between the current Pareti and Pucciano districts. This site was chosen due to its favourable geographic position with water sources and a very fertile hinterland protected from winds.

It became one of the most important cities of ancient Campania and the capital of a confederation (Lega nucerina) which included Pompeii, Herculaneum, Stabiae and Sorrento. It minted its own money on which the expression Nuvkrinum Al (a) faternum was engraved using a particular alphabet (Nucerian alphabet) based on the Greek and Etruscan alphabets.

Nuceria's first mention in history is in 315 BC when, during the Second Samnite War, it was an ally of the Romans but was persuaded to abandon the alliance and join the Samnite cause. In 310 BC the Romans ravaged the territory of Nuceria but in the end it obtained favourable treatment and entered into an alliance with Rome as a civitas foederata.

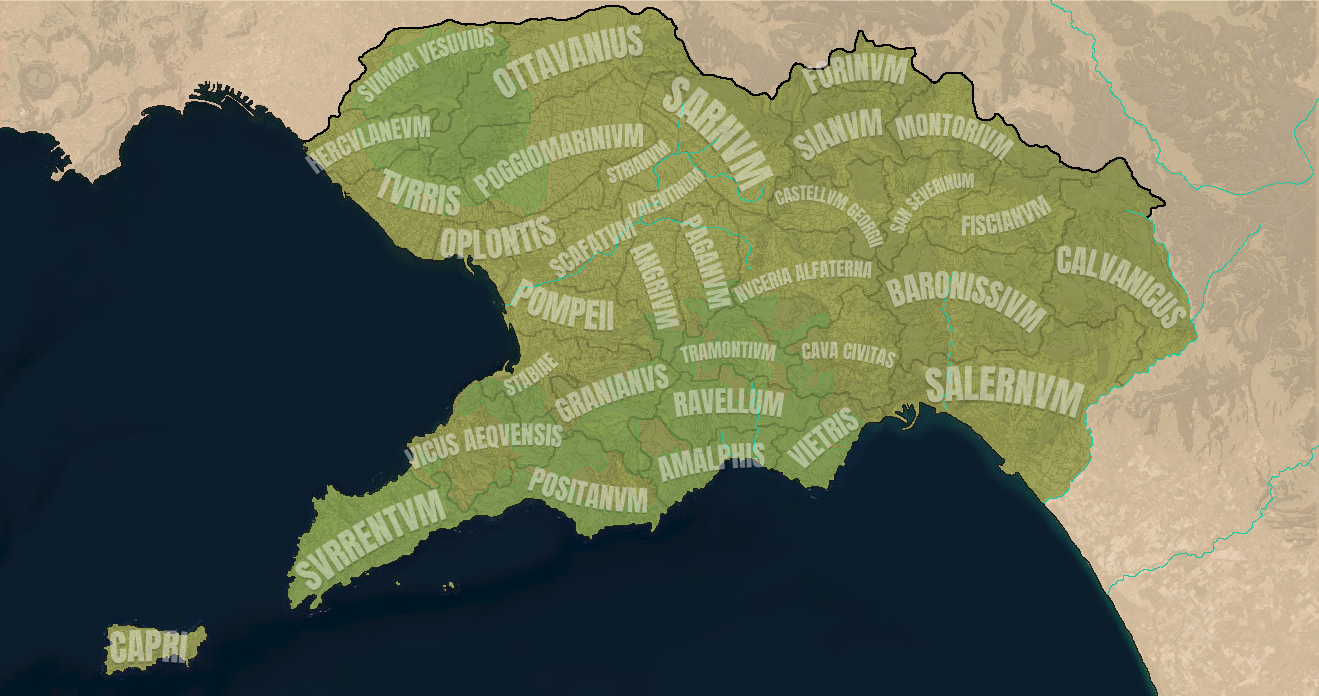
Map of the Lega Nucerina at its maximum extension (Samnite/early Roman period), with modern cities indicated in Latin.

=== Roman ===
During the Second Punic War (218 – 201 BC), the city's defences proved formidable enough that Hannibal reduced the city by starvation because of its loyalty to Rome, rather than by direct attack, though subsequently destroyed it in 216 BC. After the war the defences were rebuilt and strengthened with the addition of towers in opus incertum.

Its territory was ravaged during the Social War (90 BC) and by the troops of Spartacus.

During the period of the triumvirate, the city became a colonia as Nuceria Constantia, but the city proudly kept its origins and Greek was still written and spoken as a sign of cultural distinction.

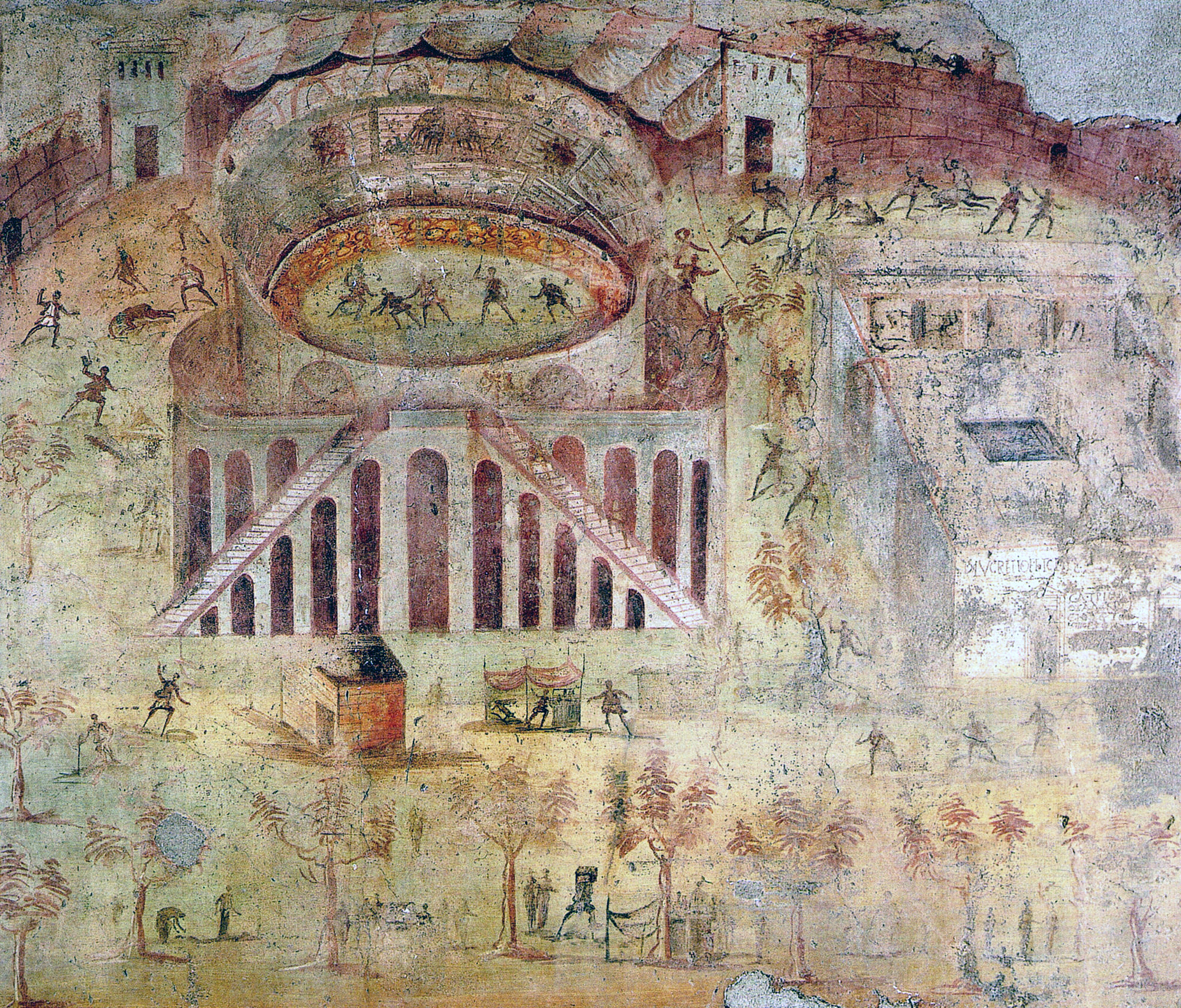
Roman fresco depicting the riot between Pompeians and Nucerians

In AD 59, there was a serious riot and bloodshed in the nearby Pompeii Amphitheatre between Pompeians and Nucerians (which is recorded in a fresco) and which led the Roman senate to send the Praetorian Guard to restore order and to ban further events for a period of ten years.

The earthquake in 62 and the eruption of Vesuvius in 79 caused serious damage to the town which never regained its previous prosperity.

Nuceria lay on the via Popillia, the great road linking Capua to southern Italy, as well as on the via Stabiana (towards Stabiae) and the Via Nuceria from Pompeii.

At its greatest expansion, Nuceria, famous for the robustness of the town walls, enclosed the current districts of Pareti, San Pietro, Pucciano, Grotti, Portaromana, Santa Maria Maggiore and San Clemente. There are astonishing similarities between the fortifications of Nuceria and Pompeii. Nuceria is rectangular with scarps defending the north, west, and east of the city while the southern side had the strongest fortifications as the most vulnerable section and, like Pompeii, featured a tufa opus quadratum double wall with an agger behind.

It was a bishopric as early as the 3rd century AD. The first bishop was Saint Priscus.

During the Gothic War (535–554), the Byzantines and Goths faced each other a few km away along the banks of the Sarno river for months until the Byzantines won the Battle of Mons Lactarius.

During the 6th century the Lombards, under King Alboin, forced Nuceria to surrender: they placed it under the supremacy of the Duchy of Benevento.

=== Gallery ===
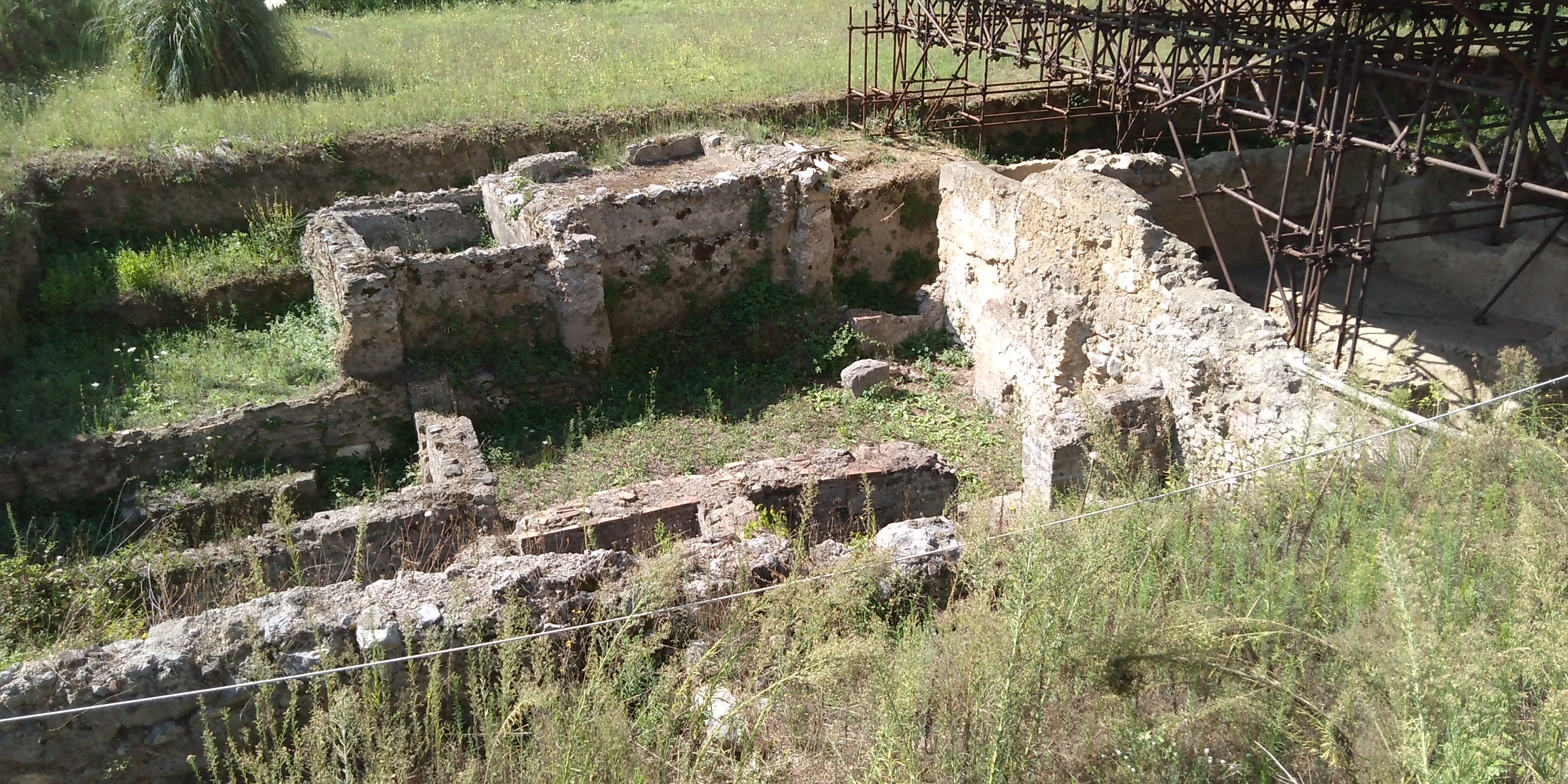
Part of the Forum in the Archaeological park

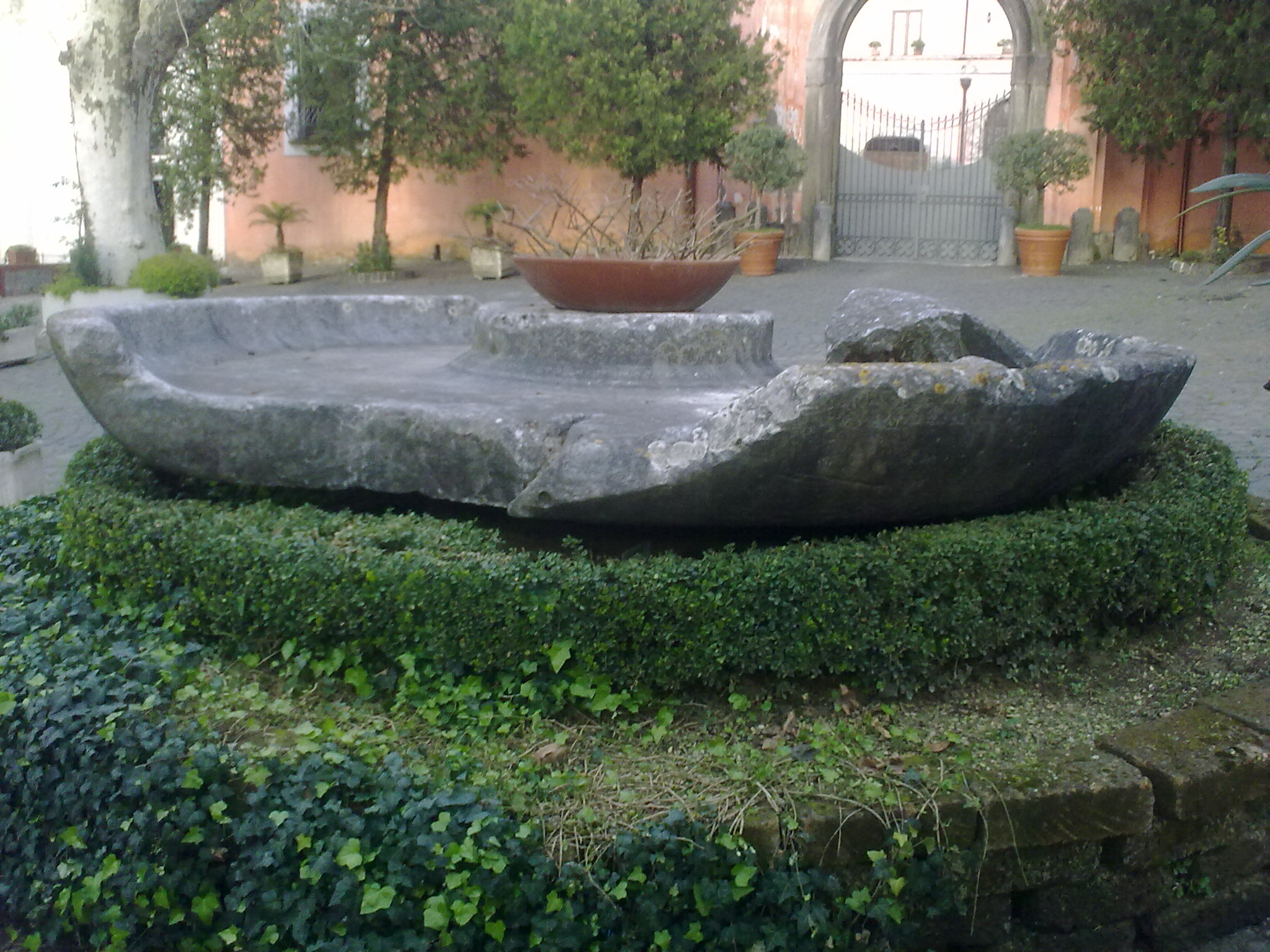
Roman fountain

=== Post-Roman history ===
After the mid-9th century the town was part of the principality of Salerno first, and then of the principality of Capua. The citadel of Nuceria, located where the future Nocera Inferiore would rise, was besieged by Roger II of Sicily in the battle in 1132, after four months he razed the town to the ground.

After its reconstruction, the birth of the modern Nocera began with many hamlets and villages which gradually expanded and became small towns.

During the Angevin dominion (1266–1435) Nocera was rebuilt and took the name of Nuceria Christianorum. In 1385 Pope Urban VI was besieged in the city castle by Charles III of Naples.

In the XV century the town name was changed to Nuceria Paganorum (Italian: Nocera dei Pagani) in honor to the Pagano family, itself named after the Saracen pagans who previously inhabited the area. Throughout the Spanish domination, the town was subdivided into two departments (Nocera Soprana and Nocera Sottana), each one composed of multiple municipalities.

Every year in August, the male adults of each municipality gathered in public assembly to elect their particular mayor; then – in a different assembly – each department elected the universal mayors: two for Nocera Soprana and one for Nocera Sottana, which together led Nocera dei Pagani as a triumvirate.

Department	Municipality	Territory
Nocera Soprana	Nocera Corpo	Nocera Superiore; Nocera Inferiore (Note: Districts of Piedimonte, Pietraccetta and Borgo.)
Nocera Soprana	San Matteo	Nocera Inferiore (Note: Districts of San Matteo, Merichi and Liporta.)
Nocera Soprana	Tre Casali (Note: Autonomous from XVI to XVIII century, then merged into San Matteo (San Matteo Tre Casali).)	Nocera Inferiore (Note: Districts of Capo Casale, Casale Nuovo and Casale del Pozzo.)
Nocera Soprana	Sperandei	Nocera Inferiore
Nocera Soprana	Pucciano (Note: Autonomous from 1570 to 1580, then merged back into Nocera Corpo.)	Nocera Superiore
Nocera Sottana	Barbazzano	Pagani
Nocera Sottana	Pagani	Pagani
Nocera Sottana	Sant'Egidio	Sant'Egidio del Monte Albino
Nocera Sottana	Corbara	Corbara

The town survived until 1806. In 1807 five comuni were established: Barbazzano merged into the comune of Pagani; Sperandei merged into San Matteo Tre Casali, forming the comune of Nocera San Matteo; while Nocera Corpo, Sant'Egidio and Corbara stayed autonomous. In 1834, the remnants of Nocera Soprana (Nocera Corpo and Nocera San Matteo) merged back into a single comune, but fourteen districts of Nocera Corpo (including Pucciano) later asked for self-administration, which was granted by decree No. 1960 on 11 November 1850, with effect from 1 January 1851; thus were born the contemporary comuni of Nocera Superiore (corresponding to most of Nocera Corpo) and Nocera Inferiore (formerly Nocera San Matteo).

== Main sights ==
=== Theatre ===
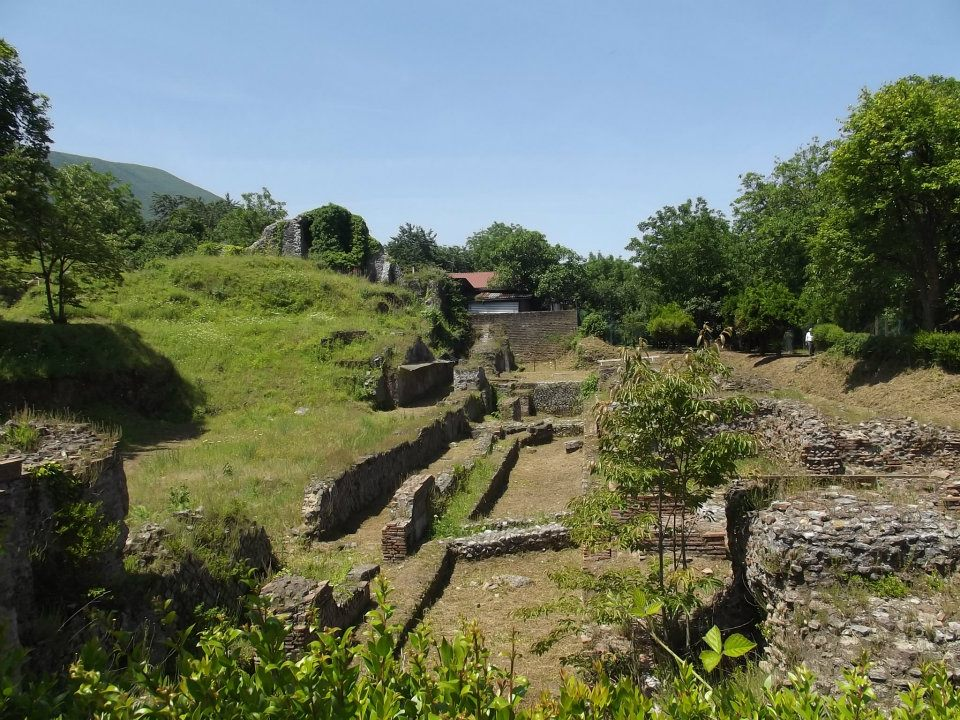
Theatre Scenae

The Hellenistic-Roman Theatre was identified between Pareti and Pucciano and brought to light in the 1970-80s.

It was one of the largest in Campania (96 m diameter in the Roman phase). The Scaenae frons consisted of a wall with three niches (the central one semicircular and the two lateral ones rectangular). The pulpitum, the low front wall that supported the stage made of wooden boards in front of the scaenae frons, was also decorated with alternate semicircular and rectangular niches.

The orchestra preserves the remains of a rich pavement in polychrome marble. The euripus, a channel for the drainage of water, flowed around the orchestra. The steps of cavea are still preserved, from which the tuff cladding blocks have been largely removed. In the western parodos there are frescoes in the third Pompeian style.

The oinochoe in bucchero with the inscription Bruties Esum in the Nucerino alphabet comes from a burial in the necropolis of the 6th century BC adjacent to the theatre.

Built in the 2nd c. BC against the city walls, it was located along the axis of the north–south road in front of the gate called Porta Romana.

The theatre used the slope of the ground. The remains of the oldest part made with large rectangular blocks dates to the Samnite era. There was an integral school and gymnasium.

The theatre was then restored in the Augustan age which transformed it into Roman form. It was restored after the damage of the earthquake of 62 and the eruption of Vesuvius in 79. Abandoned since the 4th century, it was used as a stone quarry and then progressively buried during the Middle Ages. The cavities in the walls were used as prisons where prisoners were lowered from above, hence this was commonly called the prisons.

=== Amphitheatre ===
Parts of the amphitheatre were discovered in 1926 incorporated in more recent houses. The visible structures seem to date from around the middle of the 1st century BC with renovations from the end of the 1st century AD.

The name of the district where the buried amphitheatre is called Grotti ('caves') which refers to the vaulted rooms (vomitoria) of the structure discovered in the foundations of the subsequent structures.

Through the elliptical form of the road and houses, and after explorations in the cellars of the houses, it was possible to reconstruct the size of the amphitheatre at 125 x 102 m.

=== City walls ===
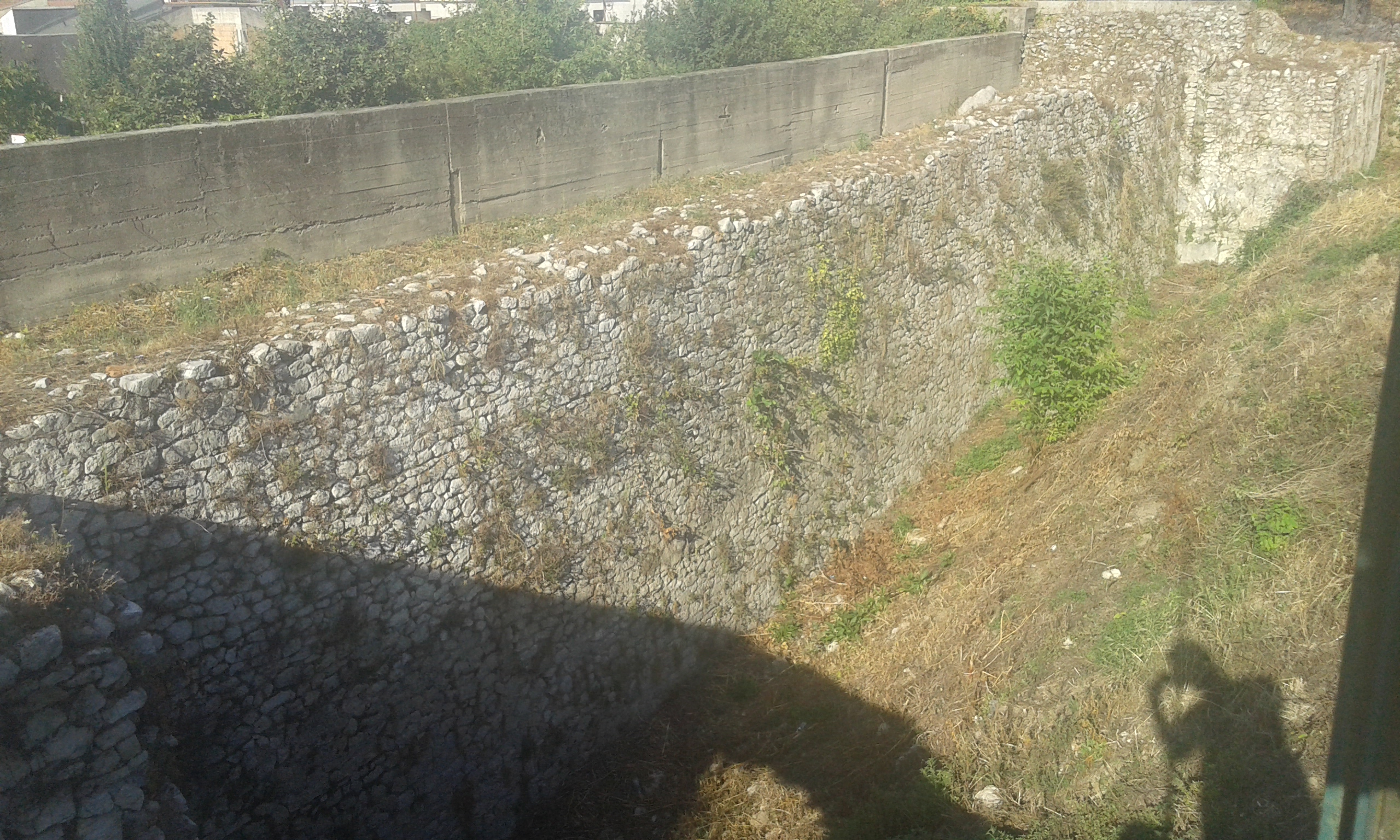
Ancient city walls on via Pucciano

The double-curtain city walls were built in the 2nd century BC and have a thickness of 1.5 m and a height of 5 m while the distance between the two curtains was about 12 m.

A section of them with a two towers is preserved in a sports field on via Pucciano.

A second tower, known today as Cantina Vecchia, is preserved on the eastern side.

=== Paleochristian baptistery of Santa Maria Maggiore ===
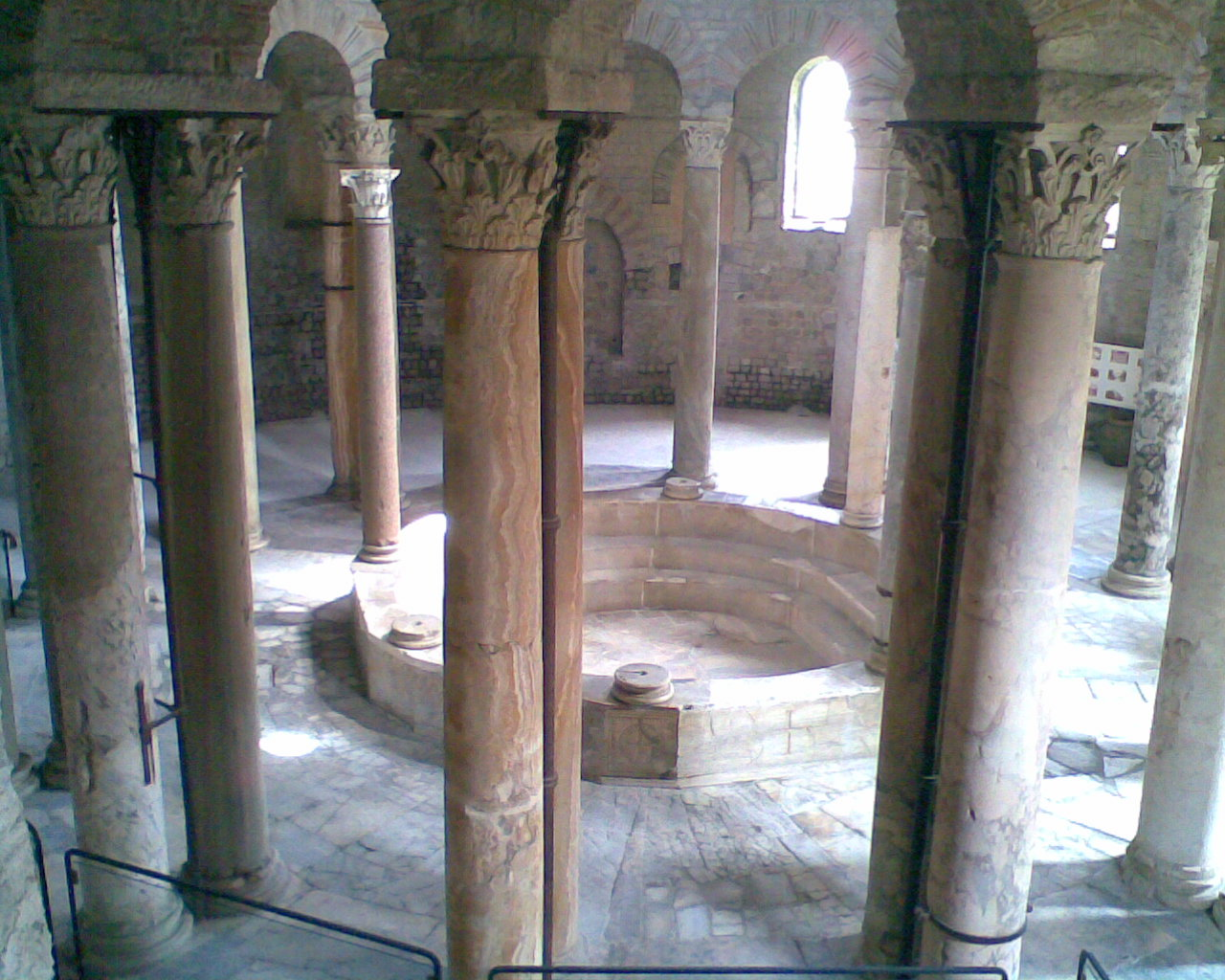
Interior of Baptistery

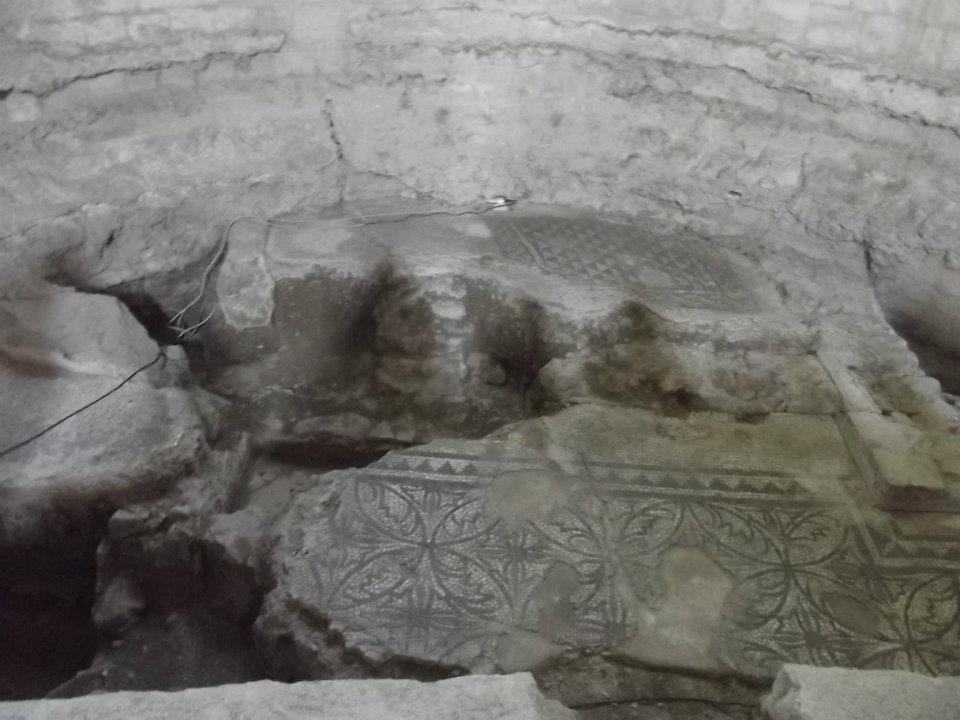
Earlier mosaic floors in Baptistery

It is a 6th-century circular domed structure, of Byzantine style with a double row of 15 columns topped by arches. As the baptistery is usually an annex to the cathedral, the cathedral dedicated to the Virgin Mary probably collapsed. It was built in the centre of the city by removing the previous civil buildings of which some floor mosaics are visible.

The baptismal font (the second largest in Italy) in the centre is octagonal on the outside and circular inside, surrounded by eight columns (five originals).

The building reuses older materials, both in the thick outer cylinder, and for the columns in Pentelic marble recovered from temple buildings of the 2nd and 3rd centuries. These columns are unequal in shape and height and give the baptistery a lively polychromy. The capitals are also completely different, some taken from the temple of Neptune and adorned with dolphins.

=== Necropolis of Pizzone ===
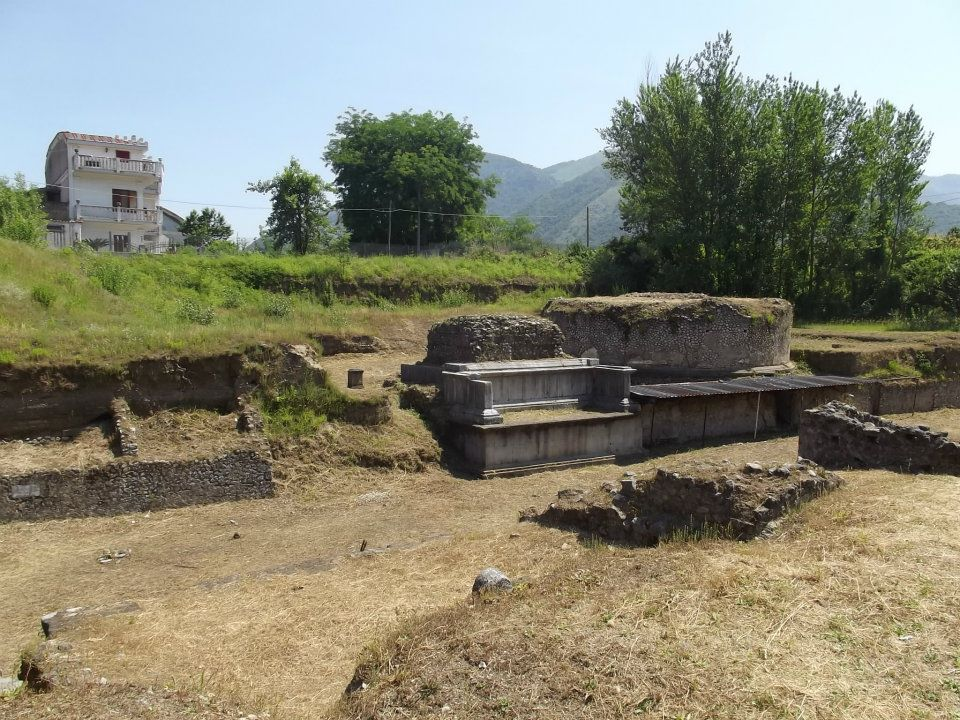
Necropolis (Archaeological area of Pizzone)

The discovery of the monumental necropolis of Pizzone, in the locality of Taverne, is due to the systematic control of the territory by the Nocera Excavation Office. It lies 800 m outside the eastern city walls, along the Via Popilia.

It dates back to the 1st century BC. Excavations from 1994 to 1997 brought to light funerary monuments on the sides of a road cut 3 m deep and almost 10 m wide into the ground. Thus travelers could read the messages written on their graves to address them a prayer or a thought. Inside the funerary enclosures, some individual tombs are marked by columellas.

Of the funerary buildings, a tumulus built by the important Numisia gens (Numisia family) recalls the mausoleum of Augustus in Rome. It is flanked by the Mausoleum of the important Cornelia gens similar to the monument of Porta Marina in Ostia with the square lower part surmounted by a tholos. A third building with a square plan, of the important Lutatia gens, is connected to the street below by two scenographic stairs.

=== Tombs in Piazza del Corso (Nocera Inferiore) ===
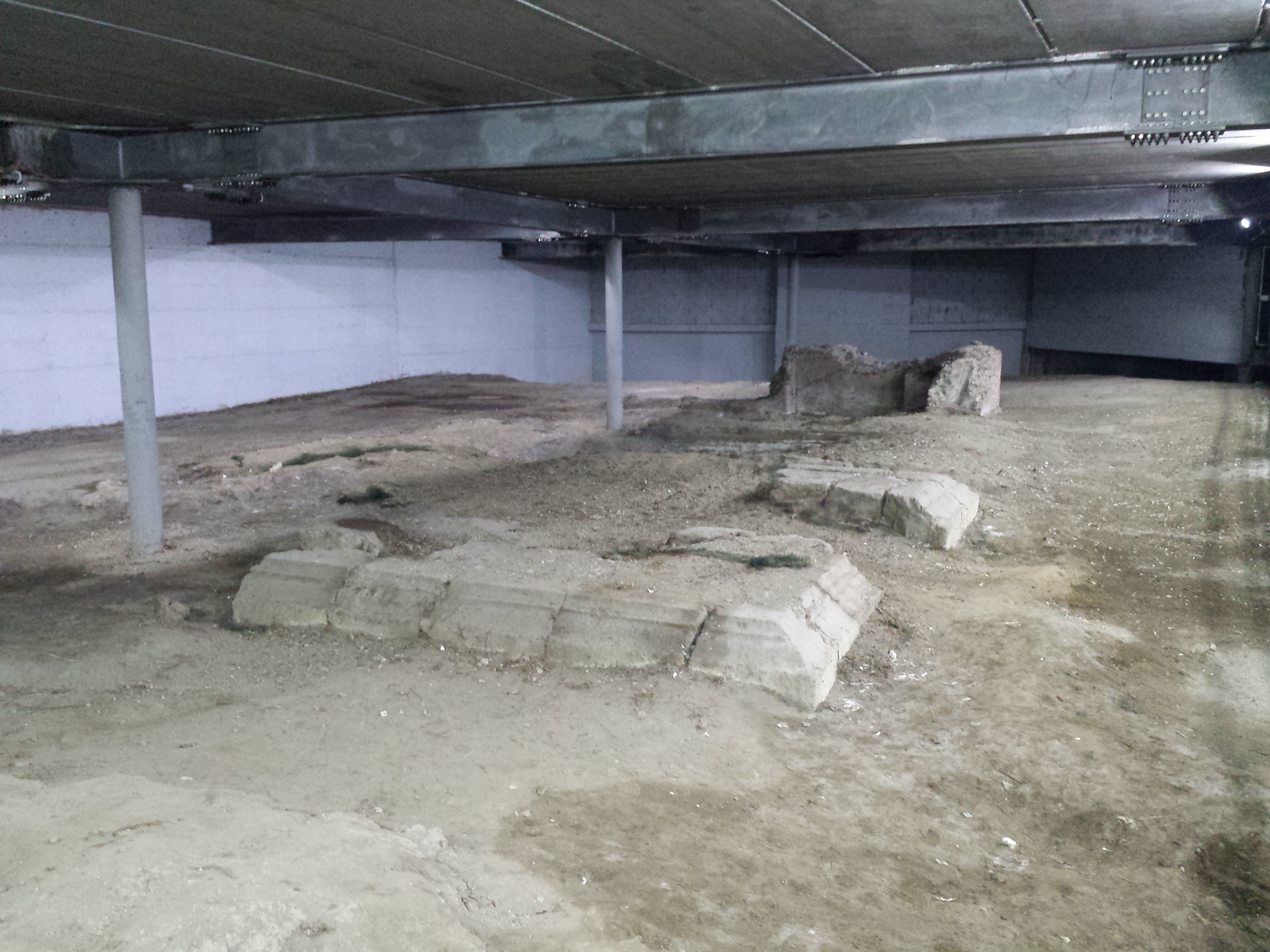
Roman tombs in Piazza del Corso

The necropolis was along the road from Nuceria Alfaterna to Stabiae dating from the end of the 2nd century BC to the 5th century AD. The remains of a rustic villa of the 2nd century BC was also found partially obliterated by the church of San Matteo, and a temple was built over it in the Republican age of which the square platform remains.

In the 3rd century AD in the precincts of the temple a veteran of the 13th Gemina Legion, possibly converted to Christianity, built his family tomb.

The church of San Matteo suggests the presence of a bridge as sources refer to San Matteo de Archiponticulo (literally 'to the old bridge'). There were usually small places of worship near bridges and the road crossed a stream where votive offerings would be thrown under the bridge in homage to the divinity Janus (two-faced) who has been linked with the construction of the church dedicated to San Matteo, according to popular tradition the "saint with two faces".

=== Necropolis of Pareti ===
The most important necropolis was south of the city at the foot of Mount Albino in the locality of Pareti. Tombs were often in tuff from Fiano or in limestone from Monte Albino. Painted or bronze vases were found in these tombs and various objects of iron, lead, and other metals. In the 1950s more archaeological excavations brought to light more than a hundred burials of the sixth and fifth centuries BC and others from the Samnite period, i.e. from the 4th and 3rd centuries BC. Etruscan amphorae also testified to the city's contacts.

=== Necropolis of San Clemente ===
The necropolis of San Clemente is a complex of burials mainly from the early and late imperial eras (1st and 4–5th centuries). There are also very interesting finds belonging to an older Hellenistic phase.

In those of the late imperial age, one tomb has inscriptions in Greek regarding a local Jewish community whose very existence would otherwise be unknown.

One Hellenistic tomb found in 1993 contained an inscription on the myth of Dionysus and the Tyrrhenian pirates, known from the Homeric Hymns and celebrated in the famous kylix of Exekias. It is of considerable interest due to its connection with the foundation of Nuceria which some traditions attribute to the Tirsenoi.

=== Other sights ===
- Thermal baths: recent excavations have revealed part of the central thermal baths near the theatre.
- Parish Church of St. Bartholomew the Apostle in Pareti
- Materdomini Basilica Shrine
- Parish Church of Mary Most Holy of Costantinopoli in Pecorari
- Church and Convent of Saint Mary of the Angels
- Medieval street in Uscioli

=== Coat of arms ===

The city's emblem is the same of the old Nocera dei Pagani. It has been recognised by decree of the President of the Republic on 6 April 1987 and has the following description:

«d'azzurro, al noce sradicato, di verde, fruttato d'oro, accompagnato ai fianchi delle parole "Urbs Nuceria" in lettere maiuscole romane d'oro, poste verticalmente, la parola Urbs in bordatura nel fianco destro e con la U iniziale all'insù, la parola Nuceria in bordatura nel fianco sinistro e con la A finale all'insù. Ornamenti esteriori di città.»

Translation:

«light blue, uprooted walnut, green, fruity golden, accompanied on the sides by the words "Urbs Nuceria" in golden Roman capital letters, placed vertically, the word Urbs in the border on the right side and with the initial U upwards, the word Nuceria in the border on the left side and with the final A upwards. Exterior city ornaments.»

The town's standard is described as follows:

«drappo partito di giallo e di verde riccamente ornato di ricami d'oro e caricato dello stemma comunale con la iscrizione centrata in oro: "Città di Nocera Superiore". Le parti di metallo e i cordoni sono dorati. L'asta verticale è ricoperta di velluto dei colori del drappo, alternati, con bullette dorate poste a spirale. Nella freccia è rappresentato lo stemma della città e sul gambo inciso il nome. Cravatta con nastri tricolorati dai colori nazionali frangiati d'oro»

Translation:

«yellow and green standard lavishly adorned with gold embroidery, having the municipal emblem with the gold-centered inscription: "Città di Nocera Superiore". The metal parts and the ropes are golden. The vertical shaft is covered in velvet with the colors of the drape, alternating, with golden tacks placed in a spiral. The emblem of the city is represented on the arrow and the name is engraved on the stem. Tie with tricolour ribbons in national colours golden fringed»

== Culture ==
=== Traditions and folklore ===
- Solemn celebrations in honour of the city's Patron, St. Ciro (31 January, Pareti)
- 'A Trasuta 'e San Ciro Festival and Salata di San Ciro National Contest (June, Pareti)
- International Contest of Madonnari, St. Paschal Baylon and Mary Most Holy of Costantinopoli's Festival (May, Pecorari): street artists from all over the world called madonnari make religious drawings on the ground of the streets by using just chalks.
- St. Mary's Festival (also called Festa dell'Assunta, 14 and 15 August, Materdomini). During the summer of 1401 a peasant, hereinafter called Caramari (which means 'dear to Mary'), had a vision: the Virgin Mary suggested that she dig under the oak where she was sleeping in order to find one of her icons. That was how a painted wooden board of the Blessed Virgin Mary, in Byzantine style, came to light. During the night between 14 and 15 August many devotees go to the Shrine of Materdomini in order to obtain full indulgence. In the square in front of the shrine popular dances are accompanied by tammorre (tambourine), scetavajasse (a sort of tambourine played with a rod equipped with disks made of tin), and triccheballacche (a musical instrument consisting of three wooden hammers, one central unmovable hammer and two movable side hammers, equipped on the outside with disks made of tin). During this festival citizens eat the palatella câ 'mbupota 'e alice, a type of bread filled with aubergines marinated in vinegar and anchovies.
- Way of the Cross' sacred representation (Good Friday, Pizzone's excavations and Pecorari)
- Way of the Cross in Casa Milite's mountain village (Friday before Palm Sunday)
- Procession of the Mysteries (Good Friday, Pucciano, Pareti and S.Clemente's streets)
- Living nativity scene (Christmas period, Uscioli)
- Christmas Village and Christmas Market (13 and 14 December, Pecorari)
- St. Anthony of Padua's Festival (June, Camerelle)
- Majo's Festival (May Day, Materdomini), documented from 1758: during a procession Nocera Superiore and Roccapiemonte's mayors along with the Confraternity of the Most Holy Rosary's prior bring the majo (three adorned little trees) to the Madonna of Materdomini in order to propitiate good crops.

=== Languages and dialects ===
Nocera's dialect, called nocerese, corresponds to the Neapolitan language with small variations: the "e" vowel is always pronounced as an open one and sometimes there is a tendency to replace the gerund suffix -anne with -enne: stann' aspettenne, stann' magnenne ('they're waiting', 'they're eating').

=== Education ===
==== Libraries ====
- Municipal Library of S. Clemente
- Library of Parish of Mary Most Holy of Costantinopoli (Pecorari)
- Library of the Convent of Saint Mary of the Angels (Grotti)

== See also ==
- Old Italic alphabet
