= Lorenzo Prisco =

Italian footballer

Personal information
- Full name: Lorenzo Prisco
- Date of birth: 16 February 1987 (age 39)
- Place of birth: Nocera Inferiore, Italy
- Height: 1.83 m (6 ft 0 in)
- Position: Goalkeeper

Team information
- Current team: Pergocrema

Senior career*
| Years | Team | Apps | (Gls) |
| 2004–2008 | Salernitana | 19 | (0) |
| 2008 | → Juve Stabia (loan) | 11 | (0) |
| 2008–2010 | Pescara | 16 | (0) |
| 2010–2012 | Brindisi | 10 | (0) |
| 2012– | Pergocrema | 0 | (0) |
- * Club domestic league appearances and goals as of 1 February 2012

Lorenzo Prisco (born 16 February 1987 in Nocera Inferiore) is an Italian goalkeeper who currently plays for Pergocrema.
