= Teresa Di Loreto =

Italian long jumper

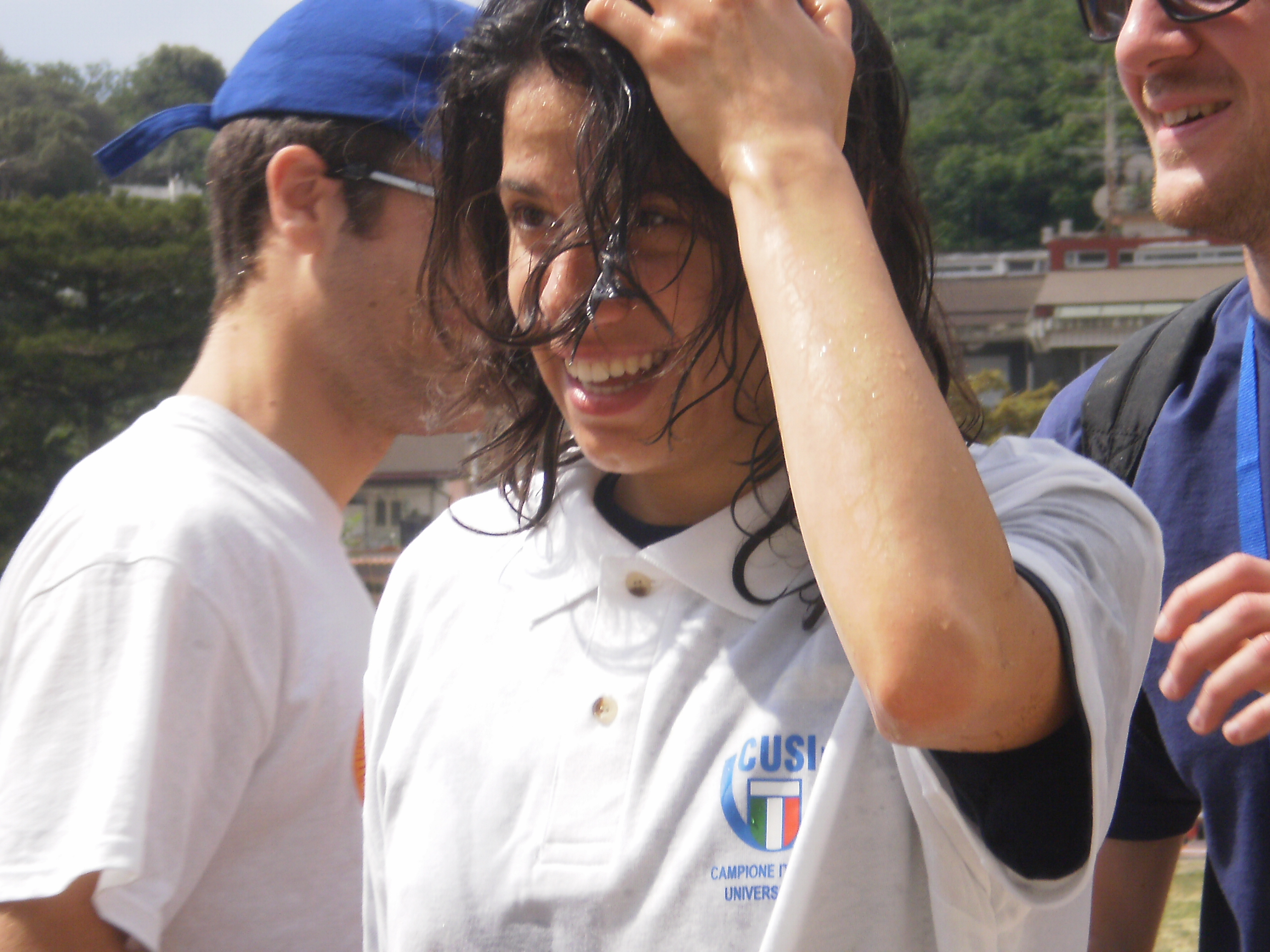
- Teresa Di Loreto, in 2012 after the victory at the National University Championships in Messina.

Personal information
- Nickname: Sissi
- Nationality: Italian
- Born: 26 December 1989 (age 36) Nocera Inferiore, Italy
- Height: 1.62 m (5 ft 4 in)
- Weight: 52 kg (115 lb)

Sport
- Country: Italy
- Sport: Athletics
- Event: Long jump
- Club: G.S. Fiamme Azzurre
- Coached by: Serhiy Derkach

Achievements and titles
- Personal best: Long jump: 6.38 m (2012)

Teresa Di Loreto (Nocera Inferiore, 26 December 1989) is an Italian Long jumper.

== Biography ==
She became indoor Italian national champion 2012 in long jump in February in Ancona with the measure of 6.17 m.

== Personal best ==
- Long jump outdoor: 6.38 m (Brixen, 8 July 2012)
- Long jump indoor: 6.21 m (Ancona, 19 February 2011)

== Achievements ==
Year	Competition	Venue	Position	Event	Performance	Notes
Representing Italy
2011	European U23 Championships	(Czech Republic) Ostrava	19th (q)	Long jump	5.91 m (w: 0.0 m/s)	

== National titles ==
- 1 win in Long jump at the Italian Athletics Indoor Championships (2012)
