= Sant'Egidio del Monte Albino =

- Comune
- Comune di Sant'Egidio del Monte Albino
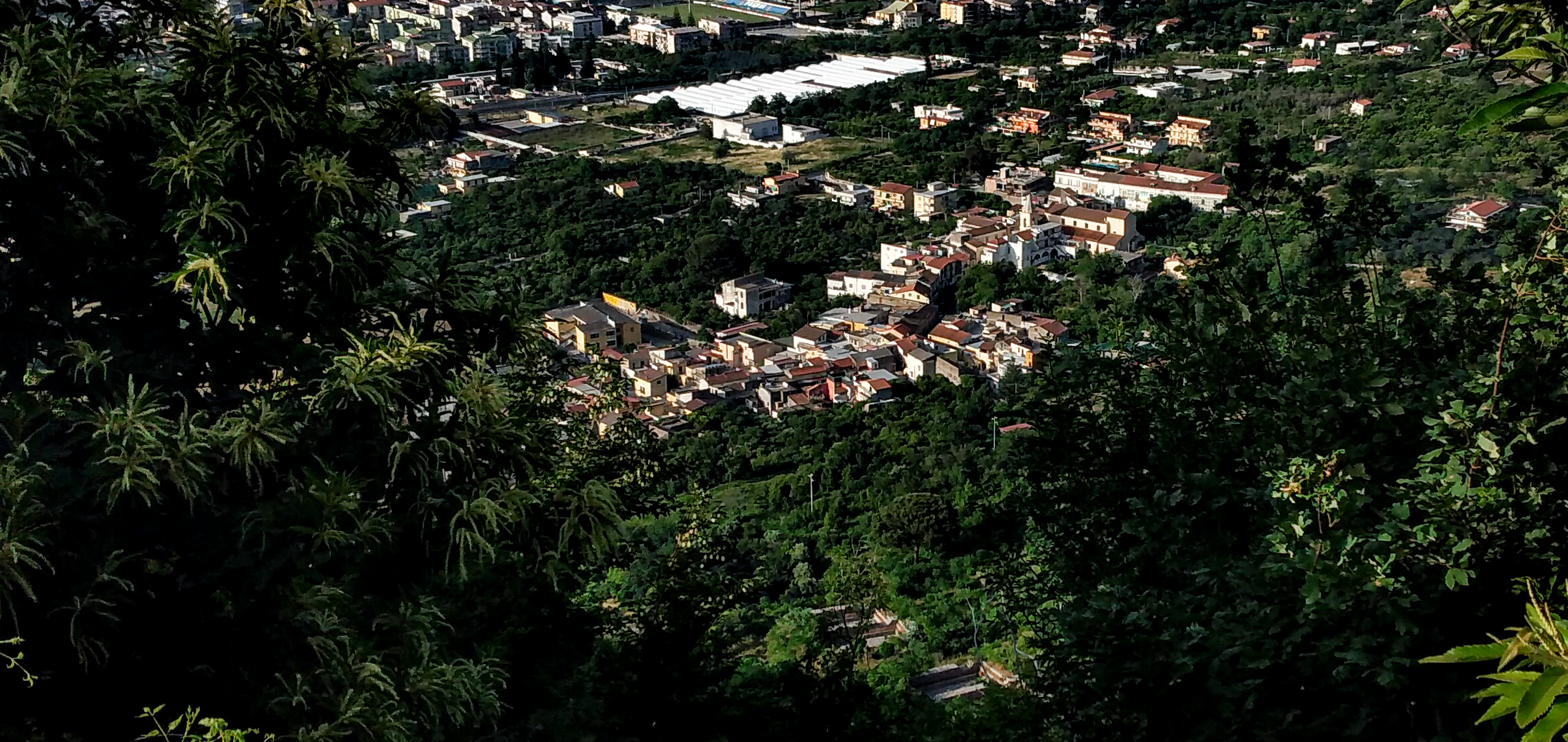

- Coat of arms

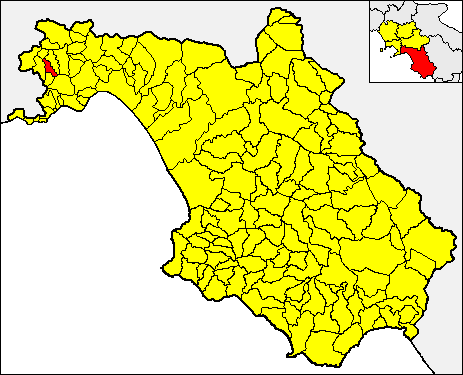
- Sant'Egidio within the Province of Salerno

- Location within Italy Location within Campania
- Coordinates: 40°44′N 14°36′E
- Country: Italy
- Region: Campania
- Province: Salerno (SA)
- Frazioni: Orta Loreto, San Lorenzo

Government
  - Mayor: Nunzio Carpentieri

Area
  - Total: 6 km^{2} (2.3 sq mi)
- Elevation: 656 m (2,152 ft)

Population (31 December 2010)
  - Total: 8,942
  - Density: 1,500/km^{2} (3,900/sq mi)
- Demonym: Sant'egidiani
- Time zone: UTC+1 (CET)
  - Summer (DST): UTC+2 (CEST)
- Postal code: 84010
- Dialing code: 081
- Patron saint: St. Nicholas of Bari
- Saint day: 6 December
- Website: Official website

Sant'Egidio del Monte Albino (Campanian: San Gilje) s a town and comune in the province of Salerno in the Campania region of southern Italy. The town is commonly known also in the abbreviated naming form of Sant'Egidio Montalbino.

== Geography ==
Located at the feet of the Monti Lattari, the town is bordered by Angri, Corbara, Pagani, San Marzano sul Sarno and Tramonti.

== History ==
In Roman times, villas and an aqueduct were built in this area.

In the 8th century, the nocerini who had escaped from Nuceria Alfaterna took refuge there and the monks founded the Abbey of San Nicola and Sant'Egidio, which later became Santa Maddalena in Armillis.

From the 15th century it was known as Universitas Sanctii Ægidii, part of Nocera dei Pagani, at the end of the 16th century the city of Corbara separated from it and became an autonomous university. In 1806 the municipality of Sant'Egidio was born. In 1928 it was, for a few years, a fraction of the municipality of Angri.

The poet and composer Aniello Califano was from Sant'Egidio, who wrote the famous song 'O surdato 'nnammurato.

== Main sights ==
Sights include the so-called Fonte Helvius, a Roman marble slab portraying the god Sarnus: it contains a fountain fed by an ancient subterranean aqueduct.

== See also ==
- Chiunzi
