= Corbara =

- Comune
- Comune di Corbara
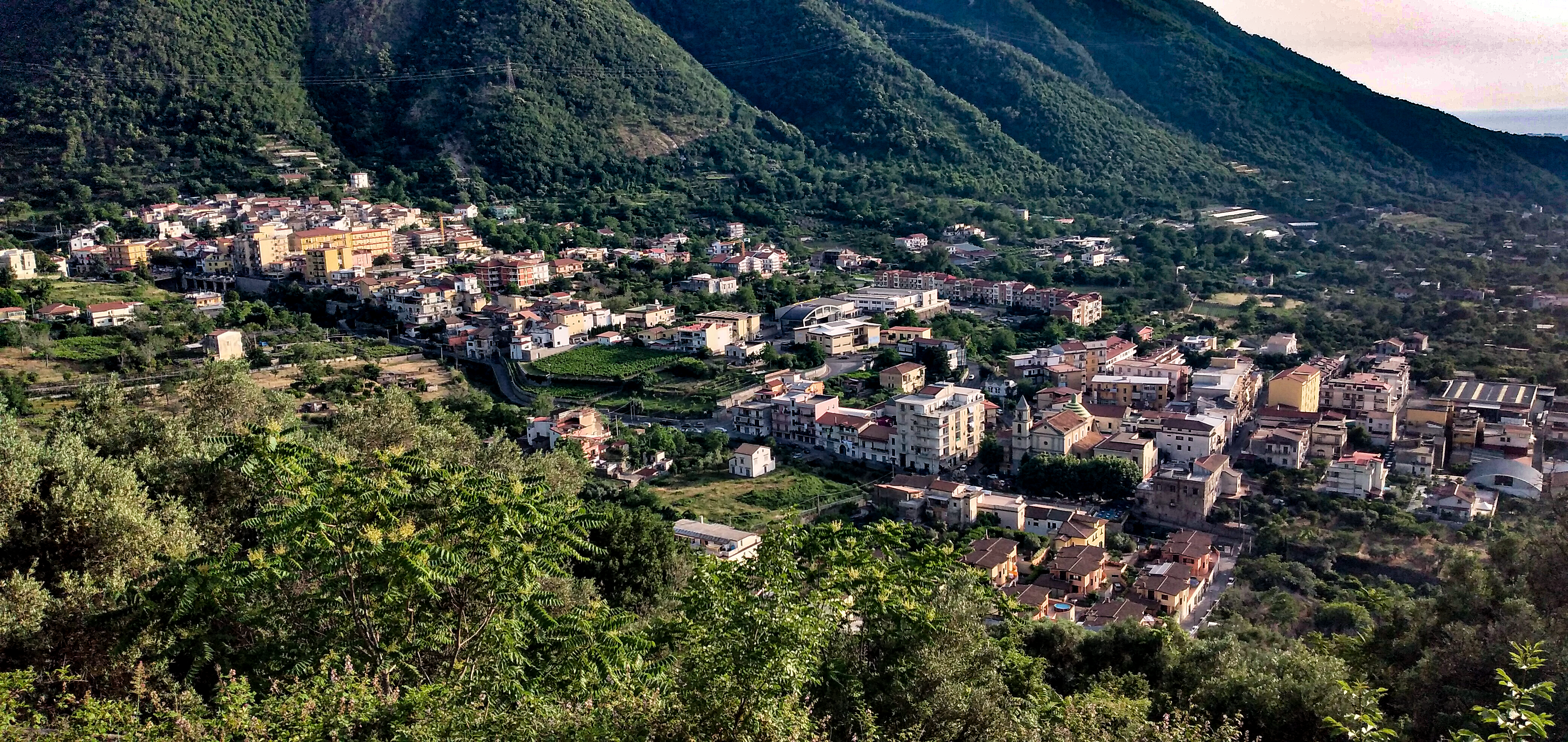

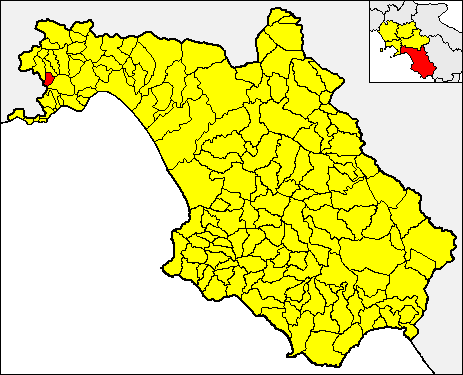
- Corbara within the Province of Salerno

- Location within Italy Location within Campania
- Coordinates: 40°43′N 14°36′E
- Country: Italy
- Region: Campania
- Province: Salerno (SA)

Area
  - Total: 6.66 km^{2} (2.57 sq mi)
- Elevation: 232 m (761 ft)

Population (1 April 2009)
  - Total: 2,581
  - Density: 388/km^{2} (1,000/sq mi)
- Demonym: Corbaresi
- Time zone: UTC+1 (CET)
  - Summer (DST): UTC+2 (CEST)
- Postal code: 84010
- Dialing code: 081
- ISTAT code: 065047
- Patron saint: San Bartolomeo
- Website: Official website

Corbara is a town and comune in the province of Salerno in the Campania region of south-western Italy.

== Geography ==
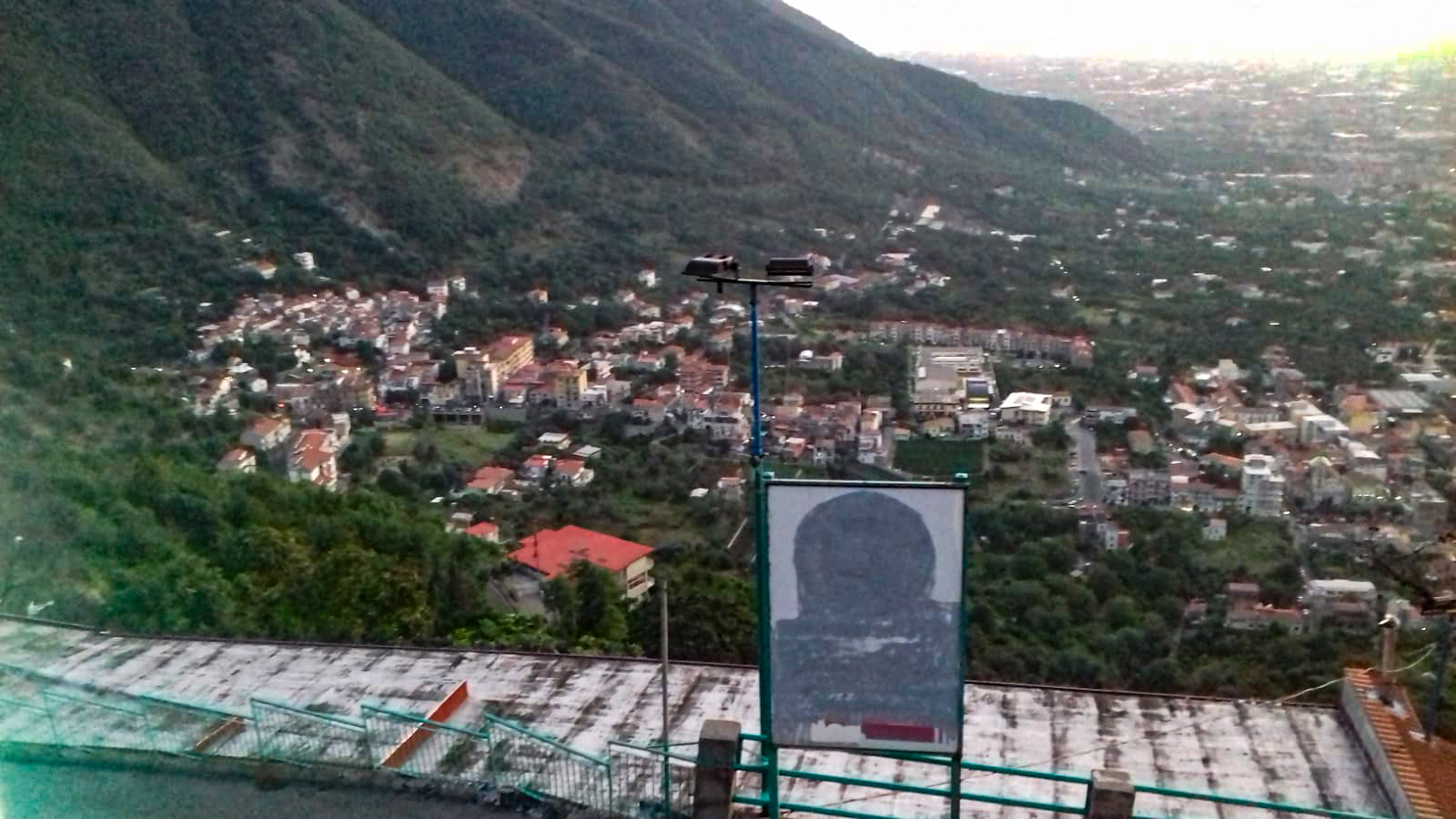
View of Corbara

The municipality borders with Angri, Lettere (NA), Sant'Egidio del Monte Albino and Tramonti.

== History ==
An area populated since Roman times, the first attestation of the Corbara village occurs in the 11th century, when the name Corvara appeared.

Two religious buildings were built in the Middle Ages: the church of San Giuseppe, around which the village of Sala was formed, the historic center of Corbara, and the hermitage of Sant'Erasmo.

The town of Corbara depended on Sant'Egidio del Monte Albino.

The municipal entity of Corbara was born only at the end of the 16th century, when the bishop of Nocera granted the town an autonomous parish (the Church of San Bartolomeo, then of San Francesco) and thus the Universitas Corbariensis, part of the city of Nocera, was founded. de' Pagani. The current municipality was established in 1806.
