= Agro Nocerino Sarnese =

Agro nocerino-sarnese Agro sarnese-nocerino
- geographical region
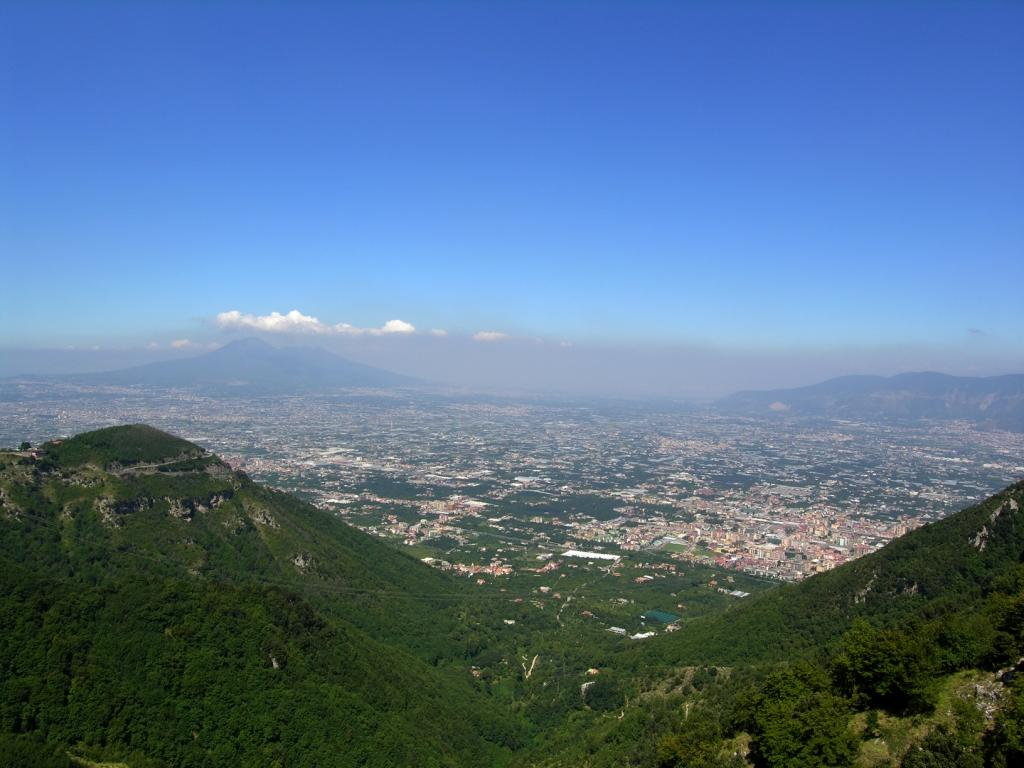

- Coordinates: 40.75°N 14.55°E
- Country: Italy
- Region: Campania
- Province: Naples; Salerno
- Comuni: Angri; Bracigliano; Castel San Giorgio; Corbara; Nocera Inferiore; Nocera Superiore; Pagani; Roccapiemonte; San Marzano sul Sarno; San Valentino Torio; Santa Maria la Carità; Sant'Antonio Abate; Sant'Egidio del Monte Albino; Sarno; Scafati; Siano

The Agro nocerino-sarnese or Agro sarnese-nocerino is a geographical region between the Metropolitan City of Naples and the Province of Salerno, in Campania in southern Italy; the river Sarno flows through it. It is a low-lying area bounded to the south by the Monti Lattari, to the east and north-east by the Monti Picentini and to the west by the plain of Vesuvius. It consists of sixteen comuni: Angri, Bracigliano, Castel San Giorgio, Corbara, Nocera Inferiore, Nocera Superiore, Pagani, Roccapiemonte, San Marzano sul Sarno, San Valentino Torio, Santa Maria la Carità, Sant'Antonio Abate, Sant'Egidio del Monte Albino, Sarno, Scafati and Siano. All are in the province of Salerno except Santa Maria la Carità and Sant'Antonio Abate, which are in the province of Naples.

== Agriculture ==
The region is the core area of production of the San Marzano tomato, which, as the Pomodoro San Marzano dell'Agro Sarnese-Nocerino, has DOP status.

The Napoletana breed of domestic goat is distributed in the area.

== Province proposal ==
On 17 November 1999, a law was proposed to the XIII Legislature of the Republic which would have made the Agro Nocerino-Sarnese an Italian province; the law was not passed. The proposed province would have had an area of 185.14 square kilometres (71.48 sq mi) and a population of 271,017.
