= 1998 Sarno and Quindici landslides =

1998 landslides and flood in Italy

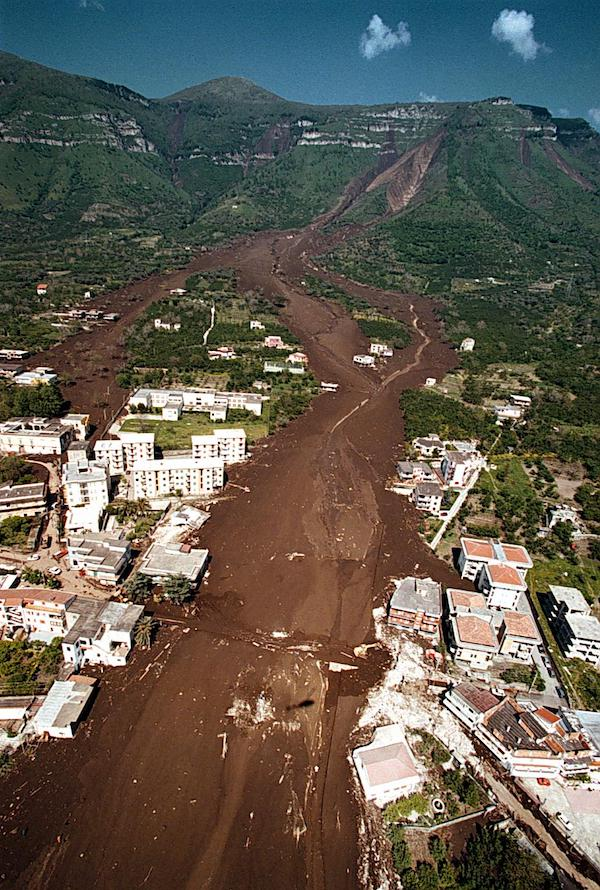
- Sarno cut in two by a large landslide
- Native name: Alluvione di Sarno e Quindici del 1998
- Date: May 5–6, 1998
- Location: Sarno, Siano, Bracigliano, San Felice a Cancello, and Quindici, Campania, Italy
- Also known as: Sarno and Quindici flood
- Type: Flood and landslides
- Cause: Torrential rain
- Deaths: 161
- Injuries: 360
- Displaced: 1,350-3,000

The 1998 Sarno and Quindici landslides (Italian: Alluvione di Sarno e Quindici del 1998), also known as the 1998 Sarno and Quindici floods, were a series of large and deadly landslides caused by torrential rain and flooding that struck the region of Campania in southern Italy between the 5th and 6th of May 1998. Over 140 landslides occurred, with the communities of Sarno, Siano, and Bracigliano in the Province of Salerno, and Quindici in the Province of Avellino being particularly devastated. The disaster had a death toll of 161, injured 360 more and displacing up to 3,000 people. The disaster has heavily featured in scientific articles and research regarding landslides and is often used as a case study for this type of natural disaster.

== Timeline ==
In May 1998, Campania was hit by an exceptional rainfall event, and over 240 mm (9.4 in) to 300 mm (12 in) of rain fell in 72 hours. This event caused the disruption of structural continuity between limestone and pyroclastic deposits, and led to the catastrophic downslope movement of the latter across the former.

On May 5, at around 3:00 PM, the first landslide broke away from Mount Pizzo d’Alvano, narrowly missing the nearby towns as relentless rain poured down on Sarno, Bracigliano, and Siano. The Salerno prefecture was not informed about the landslides until around 4:30 PM.

At 5:00 PM, several landslides and debris flows started sliding downhill, overwhelming Sarno and surrounding villages and destroying dozens of homes. At the same time, reports came in of a landslide in Siano. The first rescue teams arrived in the valley about an hour later, just as Quindici on the opposite side of Mount Pizzo d'Alvano was hit by an avalanche of mud and debris that buried the town centre and the hamlet of Casamanzi. Shortly after, the Episcopio hamlet of Sarno was struck by an enormous mudflow that destroyed the entire village.

During the evening, as more landslides struck Sarno and Quindici causing some power outages, several dead and injured people were pulled from the mud. The injured were rushed to the largest hospital in the area, Sarno’s Villa Malta. However, the situation deteriorated even further when, between 11:31 PM and midnight on May 6, an enormous landslide swept through Sarno once again, engulfing the Villa Malta hospital and burying two doctors, three nurses, the hospital porter, and five patients—including two children—under the mud. The first helicopters only reached the area at 6:00 AM.

== Casualties ==
Municipality	Deaths
Sarno	137
Quindici	11
Bracigliano	7
Siano	5
San Felice a Cancello	1
Total	161

After days of digging through the mud and rubble, the final death toll was 161. Among the victims of the disaster there was also a rescuer, the firefighter Marco Mattiucci, who was awarded the Gold medal for Civil Valour for his heroism demonstrated during the rescue operations.

== Aftermath ==
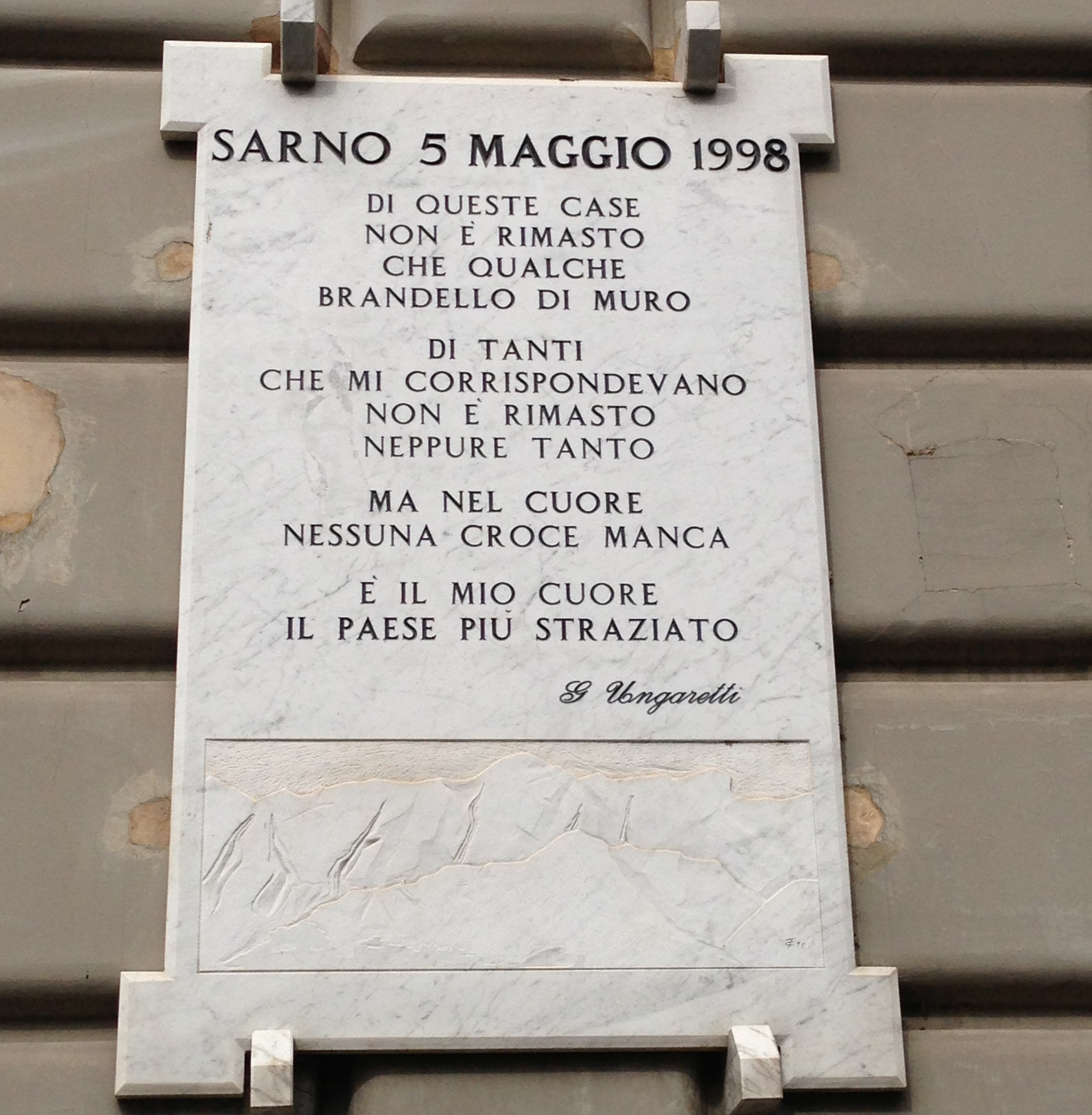
A commemorative plaque placed on the facade of the Sarno town hall in 1999 featuring a poem by Giuseppe Ungaretti with a profile of the local mountains below it

According to some sources, only ten hours after the incident, the Campania Region environmental councillor Angelo Grillo sent a fax to the mayors of the area in which he predicted the possibility of catastrophic events:

"It is reported that the orographic conformation and geo-environmental characteristics of your municipal territory, in conjunction with certain ongoing heavy rainfall events, may produce unpredictable instability situations leading to catastrophic landslides. This notice is issued for the purpose of activating all necessary measures aimed at ensuring the protection of public and private safety"

Original excerpt (Italian):

"Segnalasi che la conformazione orografica e le caratteristiche geoambientali del vostro territorio comunale in concomitanza di particolari eventi piovosi in corso in queste ore, possono determinare situazioni non prevedibili di instabilità con conseguenti eventi franosi catastrofici. Tanto si comunica ai fini dell'attivazione di ogni misura necessaria atta a garantire la salvaguardia della pubblica e privata incolumità"

Once the severity of the situation was established, numerous detachments of law enforcement, firefighters, and volunteers from across Italy rushed to the scene to provide assistance to the affected population. In addition to the high number of victims—including several children—many people were saved by the mudslide, including one who was pulled alive, after more than three days, from the basement where she had been dragged by the mudflow.

Once the initial emergency phase had ended, several criminal proceedings were initiated against members of the city administration of Sarno to determine any possible responsibilities. On May 5, 2010, Mayor Gerardo Basile—who had initially been found not guilty of the charge of multiple counts of involuntary manslaughter in the first two levels of trial—had his appellate acquittal overturned by the Court of Cassation. This ruling—based on the Court’s assessment that the mayor’s conduct had been ‘passive’ in managing the events—remanded the case to the Court of Appeal of Naples for a new trial. In December 2011, the Court of Appeal sentenced Basile to five years of imprisonment, a decision confirmed by the Court of Cassation in 2013. The sentence was later reduced by three years under the 2006 pardon, while the remaining two years were served through probationary supervision under social services.

== See also ==
- List of disasters in Italy by death toll
- 2018 Southern California mudflows
