= Montoro (disambiguation) =

Montoro is a Spanish municipality in the province of Córdoba, Andalusia.

Montoro may also refer to:

== Places ==
- Montoro, Campania, an Italian municipality in the province of Avellino, Campania
  - Montoro Inferiore, a former Italian municipality in the province of Avellino, Campania
  - Montoro Superiore, a former Italian municipality in the province of Avellino, Campania
- Montoro, a borough of Filottrano in the province of Ancona, Marche, Italy
- Montoro, a borough of Narni in the province of Terni, Umbria, Italy

== People ==
- Adri Montoro (born 1995), Spanish footballer
- Álvaro Montoro (born 2007), Argentine footballer
- André Franco Montoro (1916–1999), Brazilian politician
- Ángel Montoro Sánchez (born 1988), Spanish footballer
- Ángel Montoro Cabello (born 1989), Spanish handballer
- Cristóbal Montoro (born 1950), Spanish politician
- Edward L. Montoro (born 1936 – disappeared 1984), American film producer and distributor
- Franco Montoro (1916–1999), Brazilian politician and lawyer
- Guillem Montoro (born 1995), Spanish politician
- Mar Montoro (born 1977), Spanish TV and radio presenter
- Rafael Montoro (1852–1933), a Cuban-Spanish politician, lawyer, historian, writer and literary critic
- Sagrario Ortiz Montoro (born 1967), Mexican politician

=== Titles ===
- Duke of Montoro, a hereditary title in the Peerage of Spain
  - Eugenia Martínez de Irujo, 12th Duchess of Montoro (born 1968), Spanish aristocrat and socialite

== See also ==
- Montori (disambiguation)
- Montorio (disambiguation)
- Montuori
