= Turgisio =

Italian dynastic founder

Turgisio (Latin: Turgisius; Italian: Trogisio, Troisio) was a Norman knight who founded the House of Sanseverino.

== Biography ==
Turgisio was an alleged descendant of Rollo and the House of Normandy.

Turgisio arrived in Italy in 1045 to serve the army of Robert Guiscard as a knight. He was invested by Robert Guiscard with the county of Rota. He was excommunicated by Pope Alexander II for seizure of archbishopric land. He came to rule over the lands of Bracigliano, Montemiletto, Montoro, a section of Roccapiemonte.

Turgisio had the following children:

- Roger (Italian: Ruggiero), born 1081
- Silvano, born 1087
- Turgisio II, born 1104
- Deletta, born 1104
