= Torello, Castel San Giorgio =

Torello
- Frazione
- Location of Torello in Italy
- Coordinates: 40°47′27.1″N 14°41′43.4″E
- Country: Italy
- Region: Campania
- Province: Salerno (SA)
- Comune: Castel San Giorgio
- Elevation: 126 m (413 ft)

Population (March 2012)
  - Total: 563
- Demonym: Torellesi
- Time zone: UTC+1 (CET)
  - Summer (DST): UTC+2 (CEST)
- Postal code: 84083
- Dialing code: (+39) 081
- Website: Municipal website

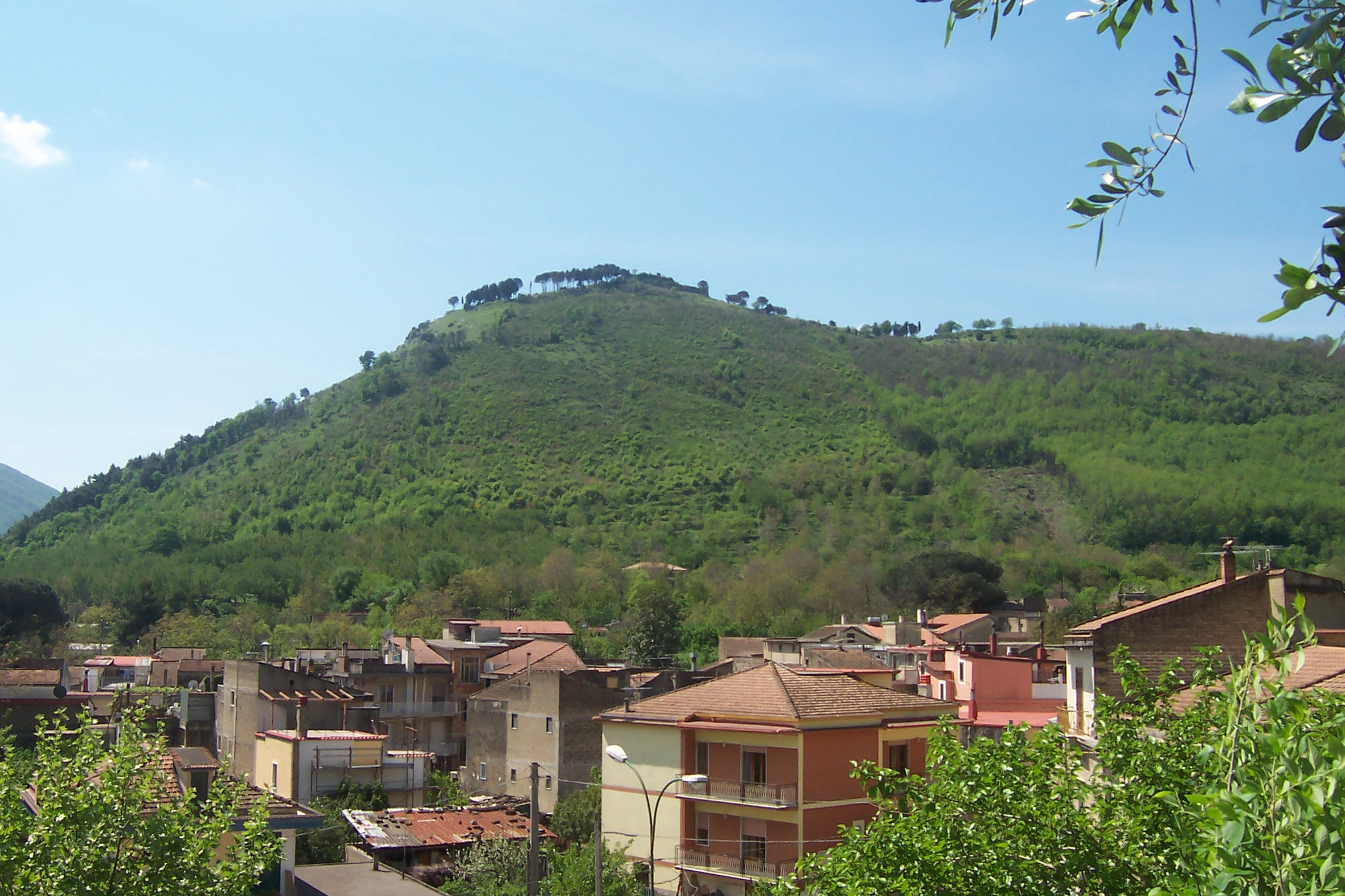
View of the village with the St.George Castle hill in background (2009)

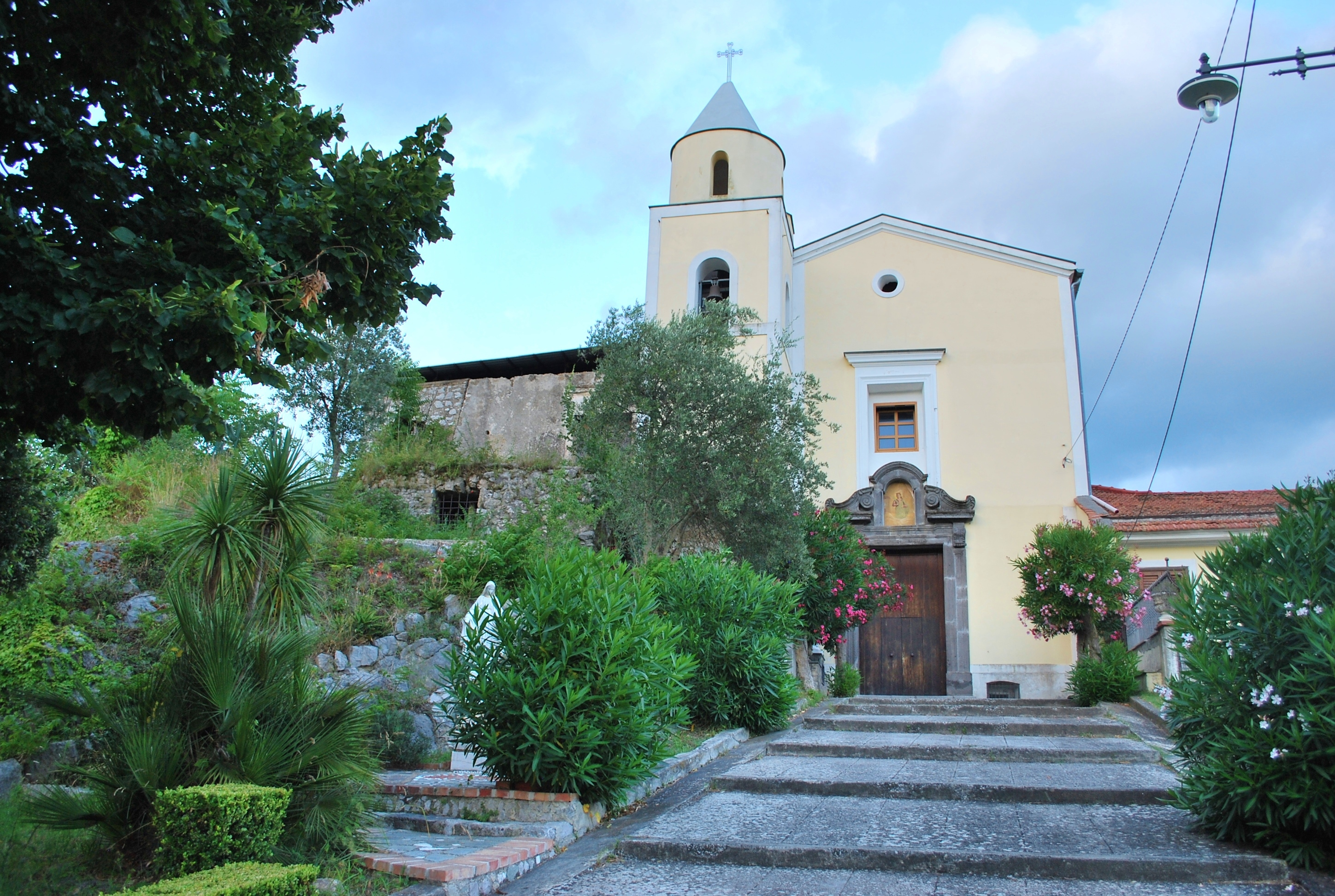
Facade of St. Barbara's church

Torello is an Italian village, one of eleven hamlets (frazioni) of the town of Castel San Giorgio, in the Province of Salerno, Campania.

== History ==
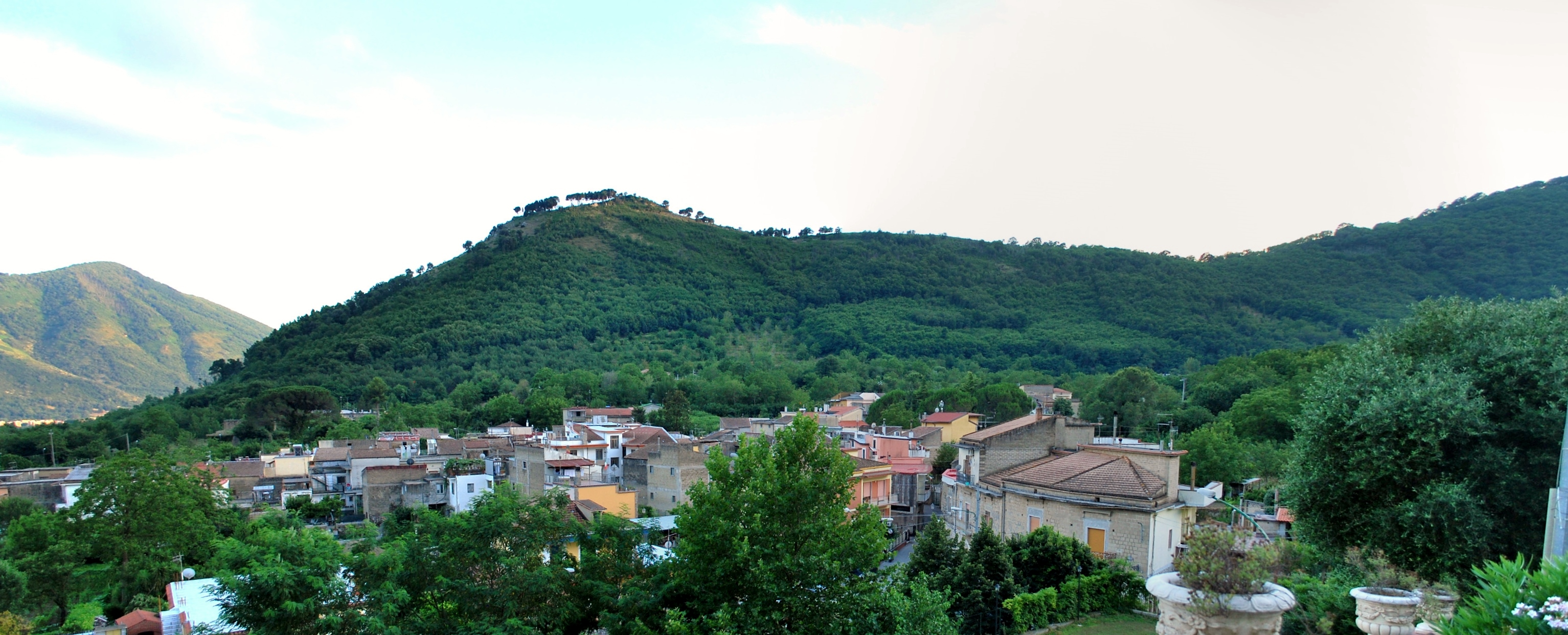
Panoramic view

The toponym Torello most likely derives from the Latin word 'Torus", meaning small hill or mountain, and therefore with no relation with "taurus" (bull).

The first written records of Torello are found in the Codex diplomaticus Cavensis, where in a notarial act from 1042 A.D. (VOL.6, 193) it is mentioned a place named Torellum near Siano within the borders of Nuceria (infra fines de Nucerie,[..] Torellum vocatur). From the same records we know that this was a rural fertile area with chestnut trees and orchards. The village lies at the foot of the north side of Monte castello, the hill on top of which it is still possible to visit the ruins of the ancient St. George's castle.

The Budetta, a family of Norman origin, were the most influential in this fief between the 11th and 14th centuries. They were descendants of Wirifrider one of the brave Norman knights who fought for the Norman conquest of Southern Italy. Between the 15th and 16th the noble families who owned this fief were the Pandones and Villanis.

Among the oldest families from this village, as documented in the local parish registers of the Saint Barbara's church with records starting from the 1500s, are the Falco, Galluzzo, Amabile, Zambrano, Mazzariello, Costabile, Rescigno, and Capuano.

== Geography ==
The village spans on a hill between Castel San Giorgio (1 km south) and Siano (2 km north). It is 2 km from Lanzara, 5 from Roccapiemonte, 6 from Mercato San Severino and 9 from Nocera Inferiore.

== Gallery ==
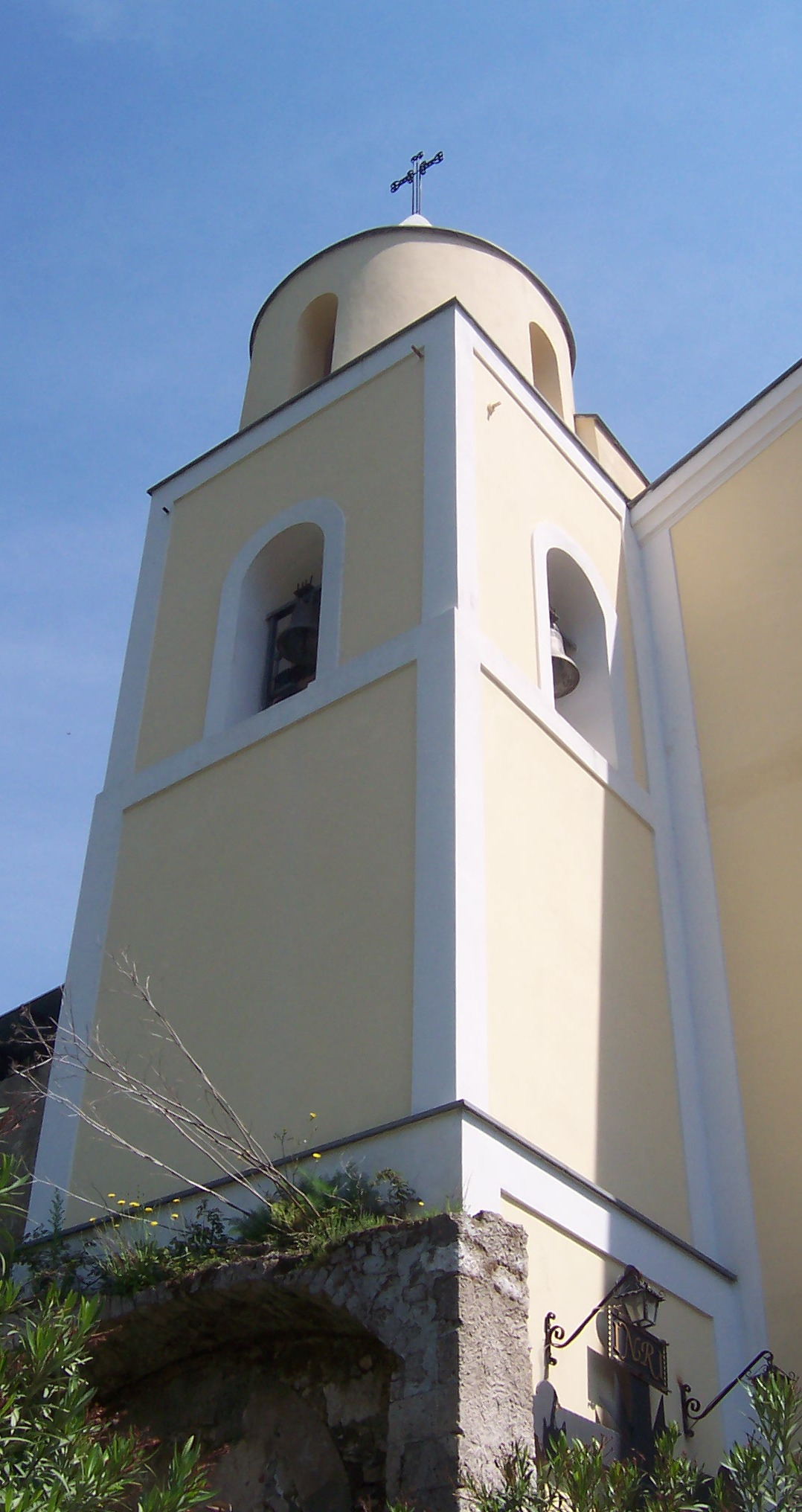
St. Barbara's church - Bell tower (2009)

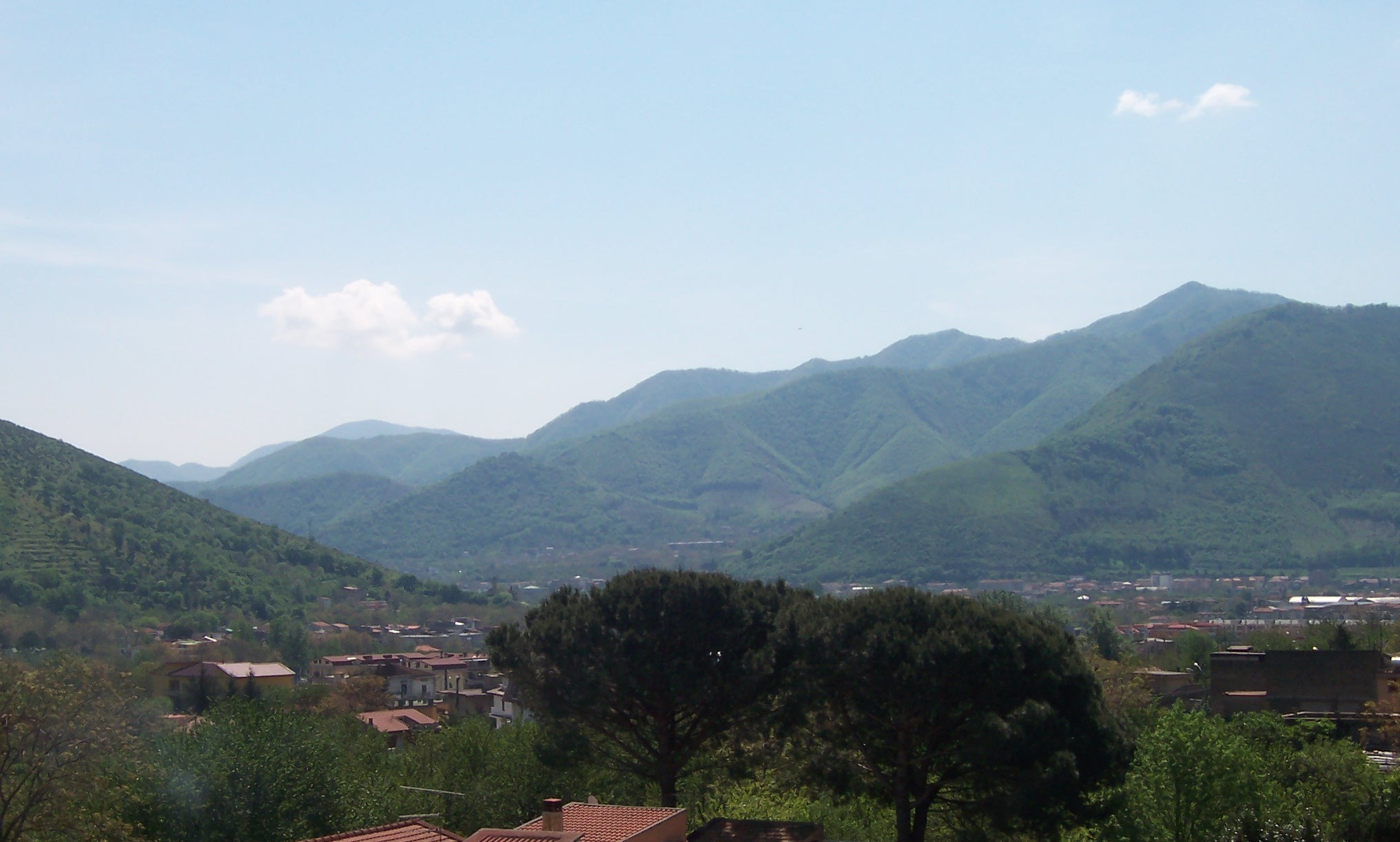
View of the "Valley of the Orge" from St. Barbara's church (2009)

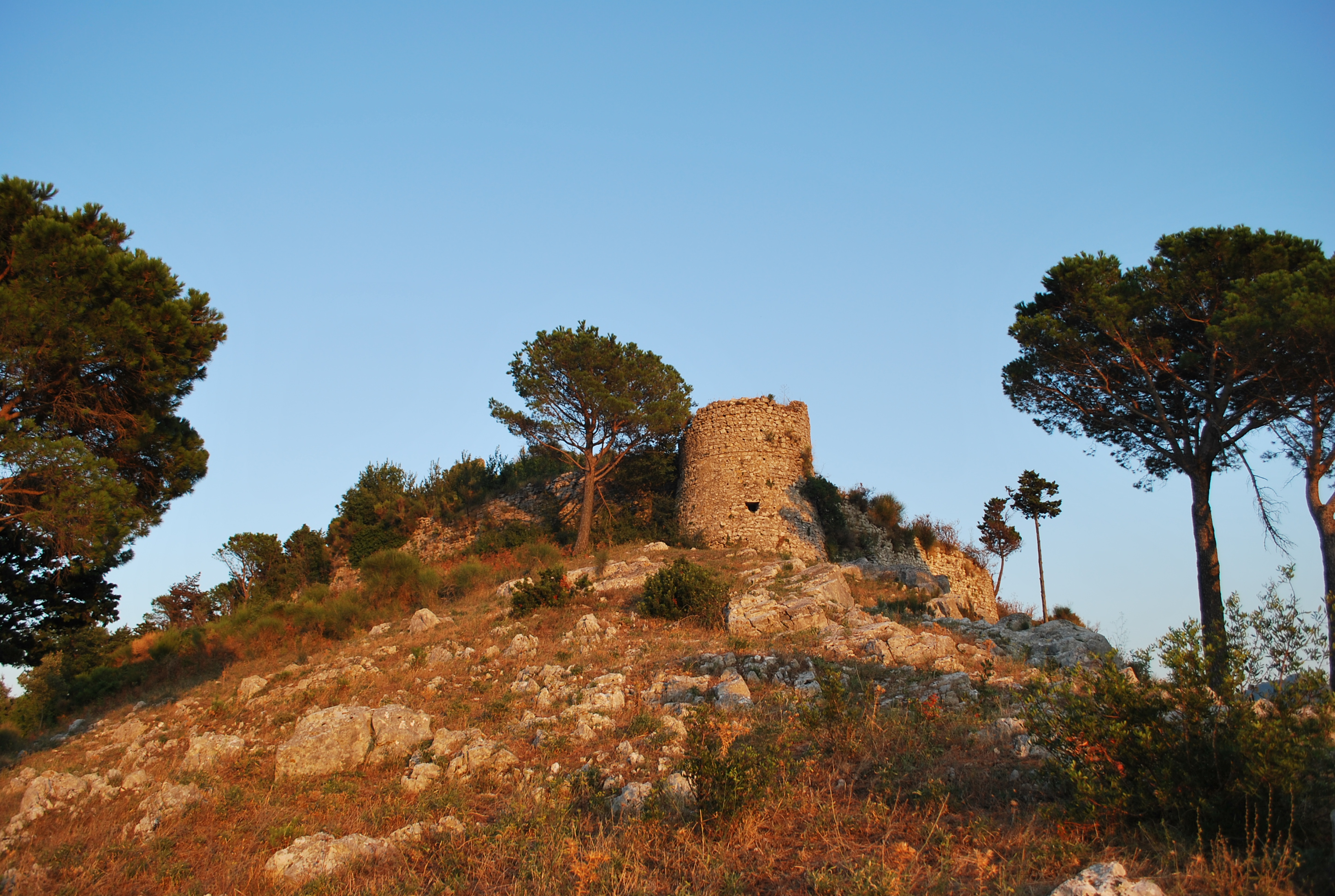
Longobard-Norman castle on the main hill of Castel San Giorgio (2013)

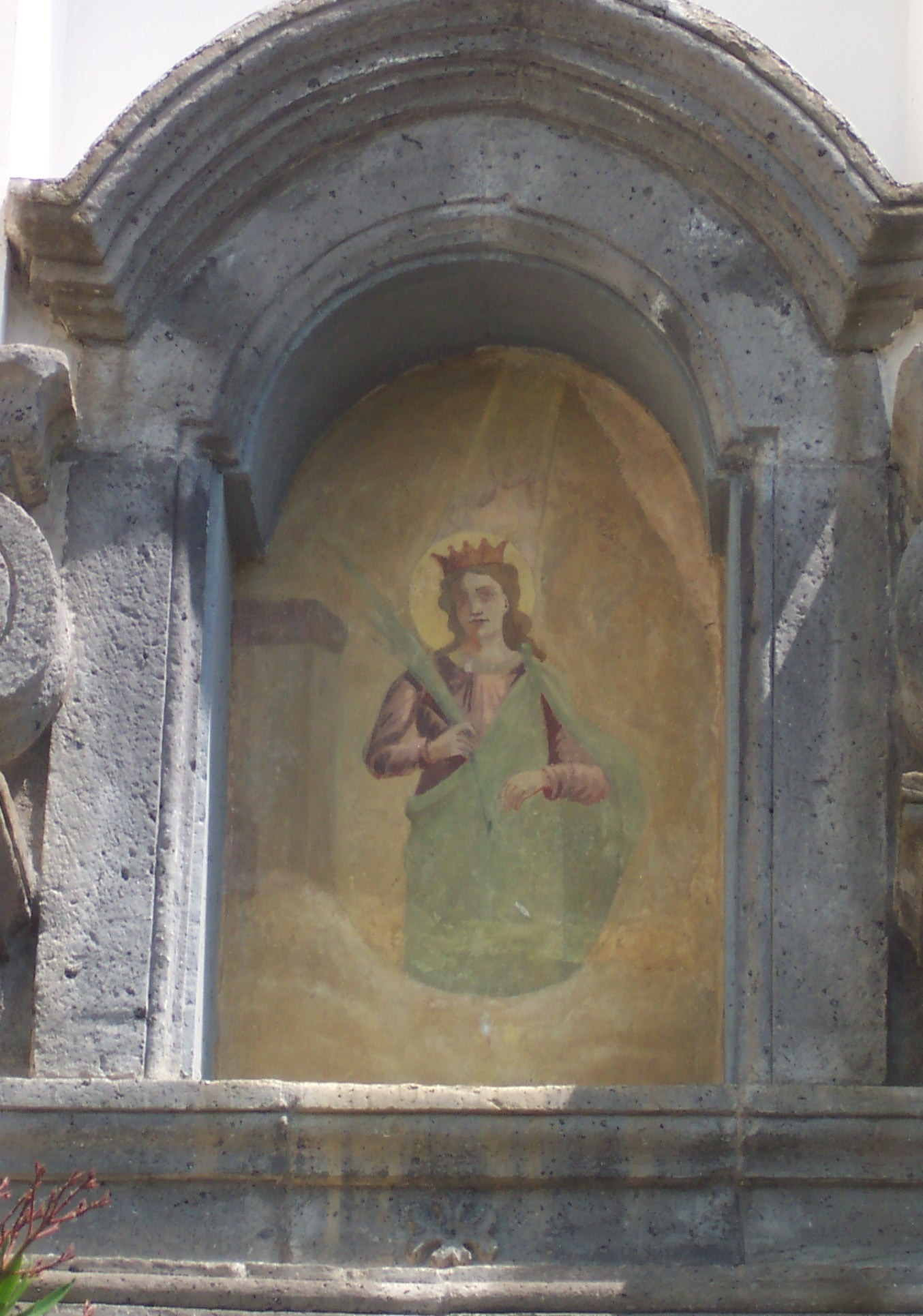
St. Barbara's church - Dettaglio della edicola nel portale di ingresso (2009)

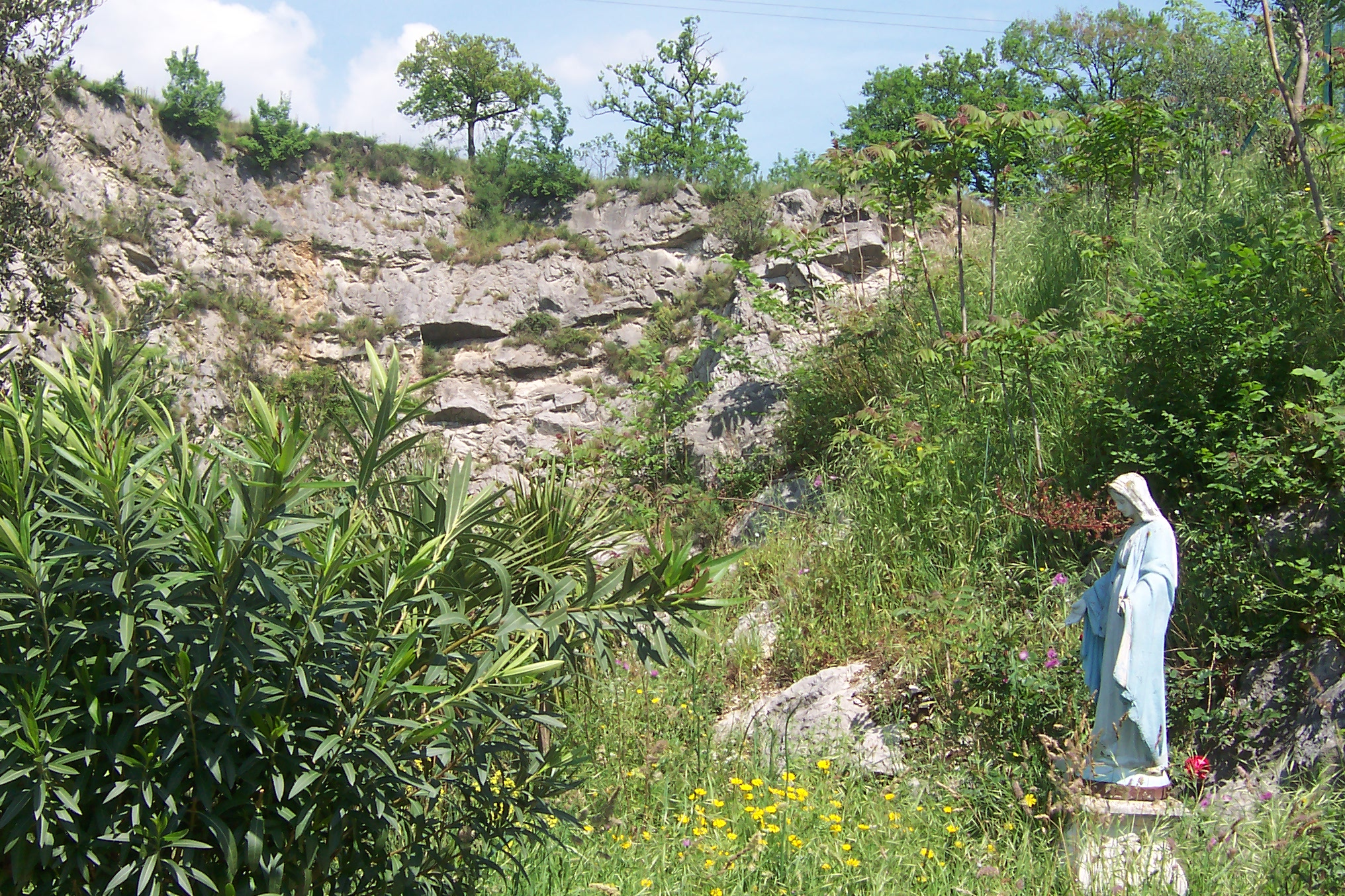
St. Barbara's church - Rocky scenery (2009)

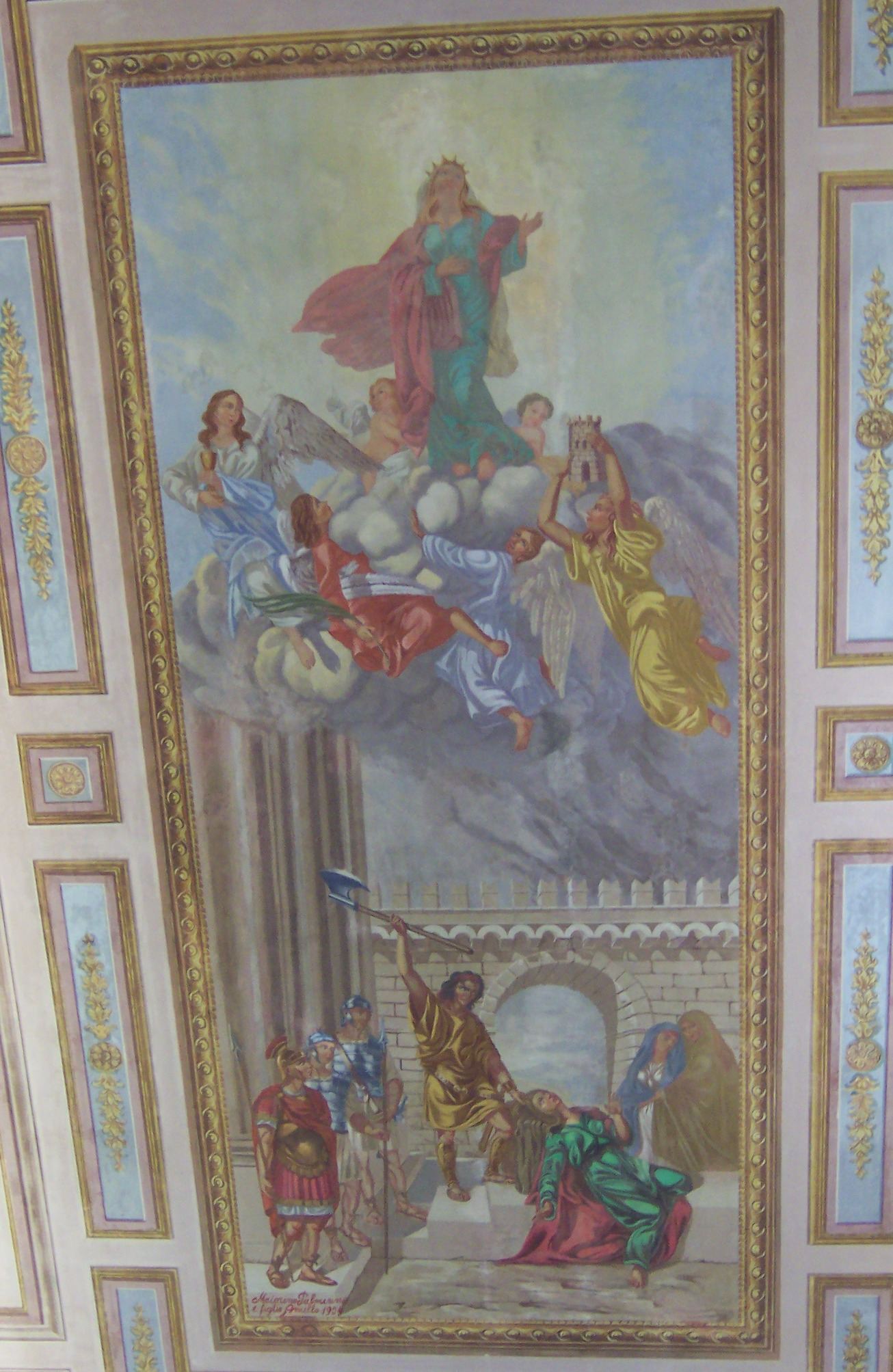
Chiesa di Santa Barbara in Torello - Dettaglio soffitto interno (2009)
