= Montori =

Montori may refer to:

== People ==
- Alfredo Montori (1893–1969), Italian art director
- Montori Hughes (born 1990), American football player
- Victor Montori (born 1970), Peruvian endocrinologist

== Places ==
- El Montori, a hill in Parlavà, Girona, Spain
- Montory (Basque: Montori), a municipality in Pyrénées-Atlantiques, France

== See also ==
- Montorio (disambiguation)
- Montoro (disambiguation)
- Montuori
