= Torello =

Torello, an Italian word meaning small or young bull, may refer to:

== Places ==
=== Italy ===
- Masi Torello, a municipality of the Province of Ferrara, Emilia-Romagna
- Torello, a civil parish of Castel San Giorgio, Province of Salerno, Campania
- Torello, a civil parish of Marmora, Province of Cuneo, Piedmont
- Torello, a civil parish of Marzano Appio, Province of Caserta, Campania
- Torello, a civil parish of Melizzano, Province of Benevento, Campania
- Torello, a civil parish of Mercato San Severino, Province of Salerno, Campania
- Torello, a civil parish of Montecorvino Pugliano, Province of Salerno, Campania
- Torello, a civil parish of Ravello, Province of Salerno, Campania
- Torello, a civil parish of San Leo, Province of Rimini, Emilia-Romagna
- Torello, a civil parish of Valle Mosso, Province of Biella, Piedmont

=== Spain ===
- Torelló, a municipality in the Province of Barcelona, Catalonia
- Sant Pere de Torelló, a municipality in the Province of Barcelona, Catalonia
- Sant Vicenç de Torelló, a municipality in the Province of Barcelona, Catalonia

== People ==
- Agustí Torelló (1863–1932), Catalán violinist, conductor, composer and music teacher
- Anton Torello (1884–1960), Catalan double bass player
- Flavio Torello Baracchini (1892–1928), Italian aviator and inventor
- James Vincent "Turk" Torello (1930–1979), Italian-American mobster
- José Torello (born 1960), Argentine politician
- Juan Antonio Samaranch Torelló (born 1920), Spanish sports official and politician
- Pablo Torello (born 1959), Argentine politician

== See also ==
- Torella (disambiguation)
- Torelli (disambiguation)
- Toro (disambiguation)
