= Torelli =

Torelli is a surname. Notable people with the surname include:

- Achille Torelli (1841–1922), Italian playwright
- Alberto Torelli (born 1995), Italian football player
- Alec Torelli (born 1987), American professional poker player
- Alfonso Torelli (1856–1913), Italian General
- Bernard Torelli (1955–2016), French guitarist and audio engineer
- Cesare Torelli (died 1615), Italian painter
- Claudio Torelli (born 1954), Italian former cyclist
- Felice Torelli, brother of Giuseppe, Baroque painter from Bologna
- Filippo di Matteo Torelli (1440–1468), Italian painter and illuminator
- Gabriele Torelli (1849–1931), Italian mathematician
- Giacomo Torelli (1608–1678), Italian stage designer, engineer, and architect
- Giuseppe Torelli, Baroque composer from Bologna
- Giuseppe Torelli (mathematician) (1721–1781), Italian mathematician and translator
- Ines Torelli (1931–2019), Swiss comedian, radio personality, and stage, voice and film actress
- Jafet Torelli (dead 1898), Italian ceramist and sculptor
- Lot Torelli (1835–1896), Italian sculptor
- Lucia Casalini Torelli (1677–1762), Italian painter
- Ludovica Torelli (1500–1569), Countess of Guastalla
- Luigi Torelli (1810–1887), Italian politician
- Mario Torelli (1937–2020), scholar of Italic archaeology and culture of the Etruscans
- Pomponio Torelli (1539–1608), Count of Montechiarugolo, Italian writer of prose, poetry and plays
- Ruggiero Torelli (1884–1915), Italian mathematician
- Stefano Torelli (1712–1784), Italian painter
- Vincenzo Torelli (died 1539), Roman Catholic prelate

== See also ==
- Torello (disambiguation)
- Torella (disambiguation)
- Toro (disambiguation)
