= Mercato San Severino railway station =

Railway station in Campania, Italy

Mercato San Severino
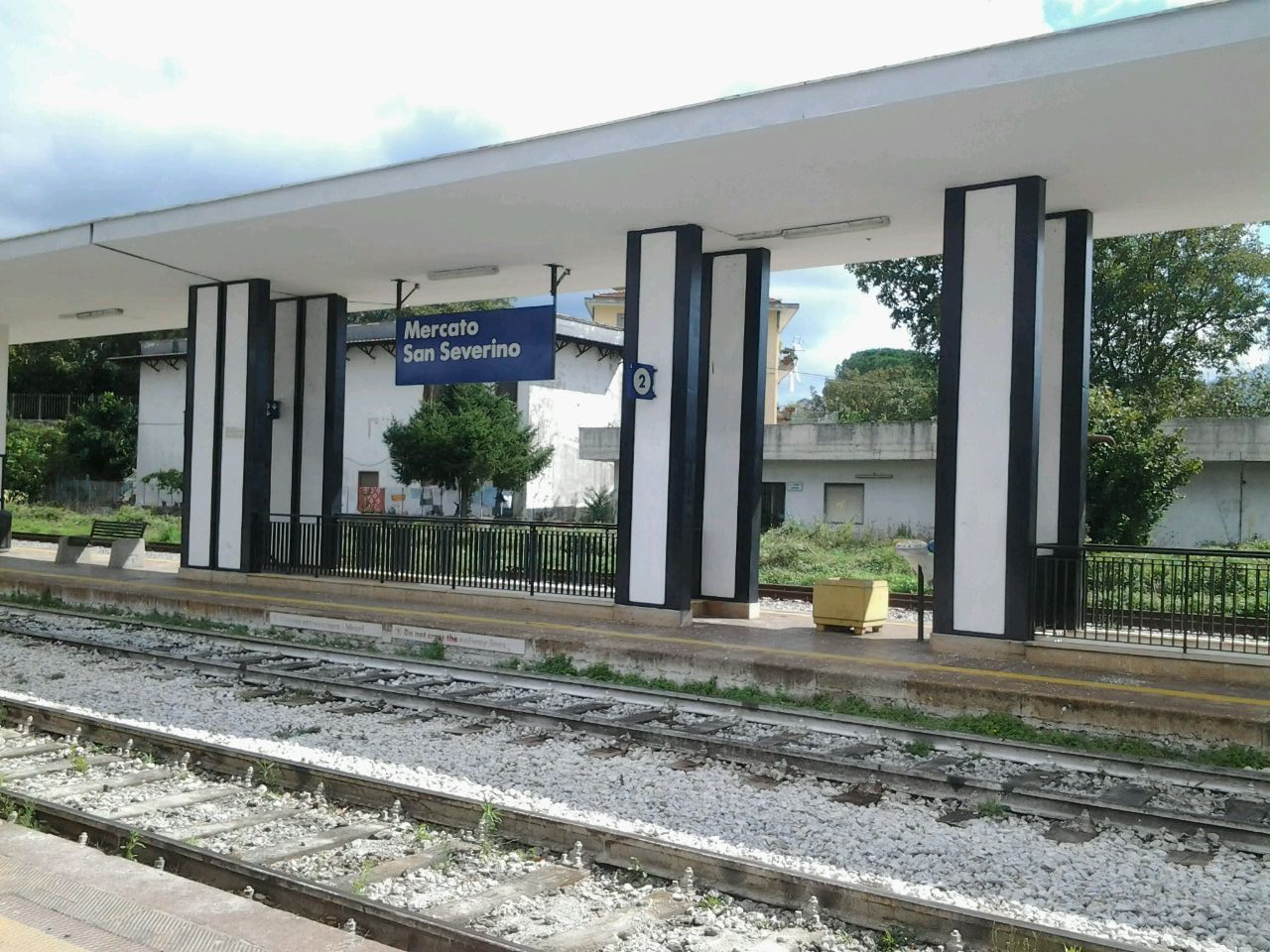
- The Station in 2007.

General information
- Location: Piazza Martinez, Mercato San Severino; Italy
- Coordinates: 40.7832°N 14.7596°E
- Owner: Rete Ferroviaria Italiana
- Lines: Cancello-Benevento via Avellino (served by buses), Mercato San Severino-Salerno, Nocera Inferiore-Mercato San Severino.
- Platforms: 3

History
- Opened: 1861; 165 years ago
Location
- Location within Campania Location within Italy

Mercato San Severino railway station is the main railway station of the comune of Mercato San Severino, in Campania, Italy. Mercato San Severino is situated in Faraldo-Nocelleto, close to Sant'Antonio.
