= Mattiucci =

Mattiucci is an Italian surname. Notable people with the surname include:

- Franca Mattiucci (born 1938), Italian operatic mezzo-soprano
- Marco Mattiucci (1968–1998), Italian firefighter
