= Sara Gil =

Spanish journalist

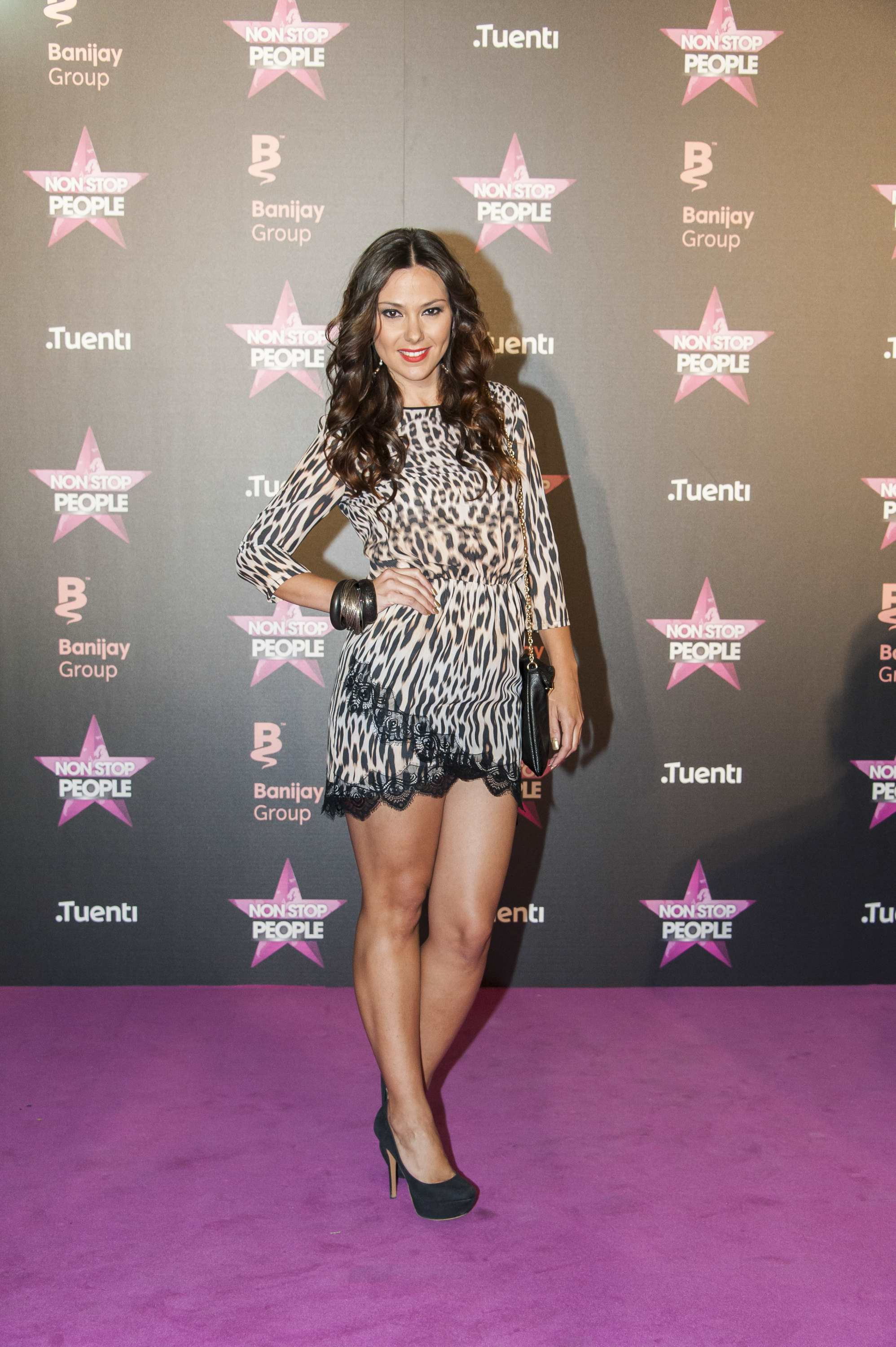
- Born: Sara Gil Fernández; 13 July 1984 (age 42); Talavera de la Reina, Spain
- Occupations: journalist, model
- Years active: 2004-presents
- Known for: models, Radio personalities

Sara Gil Fernández (born 13 July 1984) is a Spanish journalist.

== Biography ==
Sara was born in Talavera de la Reina (Castilla-La Mancha, Spain). When she was 18 years old, she was elected Miss Ciudad Real and later was chosen Miss Castilla-La Mancha and Linda de España. In 2003, Sara reached the final of Miss Spain. Between 2003 and 2004, she worked as a model.

For five years she studied at King Juan Carlos University, receiving a degree in journalism. In the summer of 2008, she hosted a radio program on the Cadena SER radio station: La Ventana del Verano. After the summer of 2008, she was chosen to work in the program Atrévete on Cadena Dial. In June 2009, she was featured on the cover of the Spanish magazine Interviú.

Between September 2011 and July 2013, she collaborated on the program La Mar de Noches in Los 40 Principales with presenter Mar Montoro. She appeared again on the cover of Interviú magazine in July 2013, posing while pregnant. In September 2013, Sara started collaborating with Josep Lobató and Laura Manzanedo on the radio program Ponte A Prueba on Europa FM. On 7 May 2015 Sara left the radio to work on TV. Non Stop People Movistar+
