= House of Sanseverino =

Italian noble family

House of Sanseverino Casa di Sanseverino
- Arms of House Sanseverino
- Country: Kingdom of Sicily; Kingdom of Naples; Kingdom of the Two Sicilies; Kingdom of Italy
- Founded: 1061
- Founder: Turgisio
- Titles: Cardinal (non-hereditary); The Prince of Bisignano; The Prince of Salerno; Duke of San Donato; Baron of Càlvera; Baron of Cilento; Baron of Diano; Baron of Lauria; Baron of Sanseverino; Baron of Sant'Angelo a Fasanella; Count of Caserta; Count of Chiaromonte; Count of Colorno; Count of Marsico; Count of Mileto; Count of Tricarico; Lord of Atena Lucana; Lord of Castelluccio; Lord of Ceglie; Lord of Centola; Lord of Corbella; Lord of Cosentino; Lord of Cuccaro; Lord of Monteforte; Lord of Padula; Lord of Pantoliano; Lord of Policastro; Lord of Polla; Lord of Postiglione; Lord of San Severino; Lord of Sanza; Lord of Serre
- Motto: NEC MORSUS TIMEBO (Latin for "I will fear no bite")
- Cadet branches: Sanseverino of Marcellinara; Vimercati Sanseverino of Crema; Sanseverino of Colorno (extinct); Sanseverino of San Donato (extinct); Sanseverino of Bisignano (extinct); Costa-Sanseverino (extinct); Sanseverino of Lauro (extinct); Sanseverino of Sesto Fiorentino (extinct)

The House of Sanseverino (also known as San Severino) was an Italian noble family that played a prominent role in the Kingdom of Sicily (prior to the War of the Sicilian Vespers) and were one of the seven great families in the Kingdom of Naples. The Marcellinara branch of this family continues to the present day.

== History ==
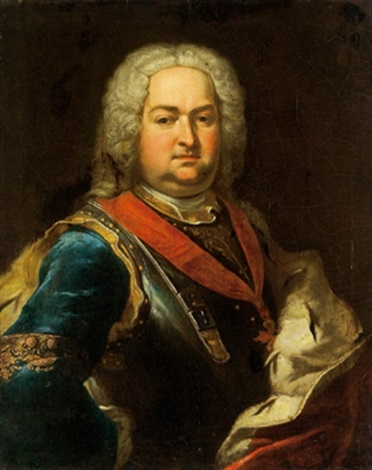
Luigi II Sanseverino, Prince of Bisignano (1705-1772), by Giuseppe Bonito

The Sanseverino family originates from the Norman knight Turgisio of Arnes, an alleged descendant of the House of Normandy, who was invested with the county of Rota by Robert Guiscard in 1061. The name Sanseverino originates from the castle in Mercato San Severino which Turgisio adopted as his surname. In the struggle between the Aragonese and the Angevins for the throne of Naples, the family was divided: Roberto Sanseverino d'Aragona, count of Caiazzo (d. 1487), supported Ferdinand I of Naples, but his son Galeazzo (d. 1525), who was married to a daughter of Ludovico Sforza, died fighting for the French at the battle of Pavia. The condottiere Ferdinando Sanseverino, Prince of Salerno (d. 1507), who was the patron of Bernardo Tasso, fought in the imperial army of Charles V. Ferrante was a resolute defender of Neapolitan rights in the face of imposed Spanish institutions and when the Spanish Inquisition was introduced in Naples in 1552 he was obliged to flee to France.

The family owned 300 fiefs, 40 counties, nine marquisates, twelve duchies and ten principalities, primarily located in Calabria, Campania, Basilicata, and Apulia. From this family emerged cardinals, viceroys, marshals and condottieri.

== See also ==
- Sanseverino
