= Forino =

- Comune
- Comune di Forino
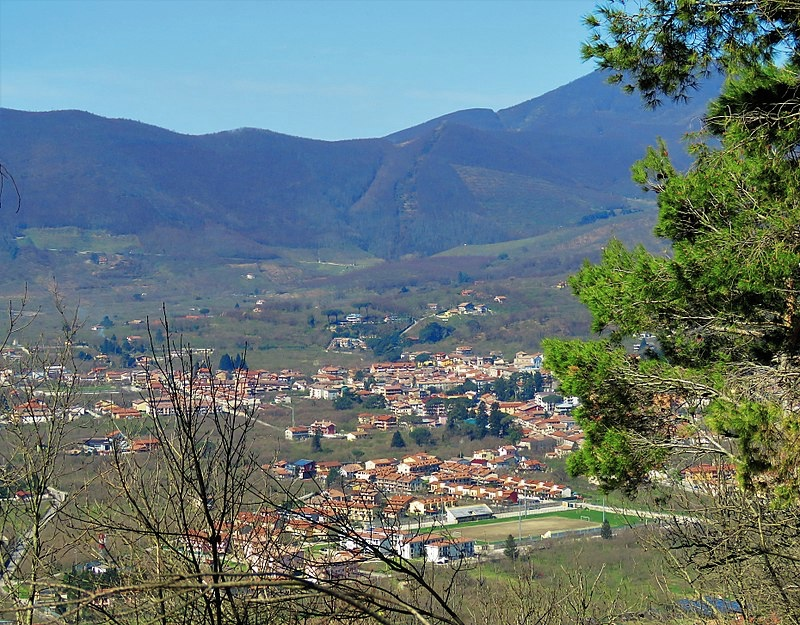

- Location within Italy Location within Campania
- Coordinates: 40°51′49″N 14°44′13″E
- Country: Italy
- Region: Campania
- Province: Avellino (AV)
- Frazioni: Castello, Celzi, Petruro

Government
  - Mayor: Antonio Olivieri

Area
  - Total: 20.39 km^{2} (7.87 sq mi)
- Elevation: 420 m (1,380 ft)

Population (31 December 2017)
  - Total: 5,357
  - Density: 262.7/km^{2} (680.5/sq mi)
- Demonym: Forinesi
- Time zone: UTC+1 (CET)
  - Summer (DST): UTC+2 (CEST)
- Postal code: 83020
- Dialing code: 0825
- Patron saint: Saint Nicholas of Bari
- Saint day: 6 December
- Website: Official website

Forino (Irpino: Furìnë) is a town and comune in the province of Avellino, Campania, southern Italy.

== Geography ==
The town, located on a hillside between Salerno and Avellino, borders with the municipalities of Bracigliano, Contrada, Monteforte Irpino, Montoro, Moschiano and Quindici.

== History ==
On 8 May 663 AD the town was the scene of a battle between the Byzantine army of Constans II and the Lombard army of Romuald I of Benevento, son of Grimoald I and duke of Benevento. According to legend, St. Michael made an apparition in this battle on the side of the Lombards. After this crushing defeat, Constans retired to Naples and gave up his attempts to expel the Lombards from south Italy.

According to other sources, the battle took place at Calore Irpino, where the Calore river joins with the Volturno.
