= Montorio =

Montorio may refer to several places and people:

== Italy ==
- Montorio, Monzuno, a hamlet in Bologna, Emilia-Romagna
- Montorio, Sorano, a hamlet in Grosseto, Tuecany
- Montorio al Vomano, a town in Teramo, Abruzzo
- Montorio nei Frentani, a town in Campobasso, Molise
- Montorio Romano, a town in Rome, Lazio
- Montorio Veronese, a town in Verona, Veneto

=== Buildings ===
- San Pietro in Montorio, a church in Rome, Lazio

== Spain ==
- Montorio, Province of Burgos, a municipality in Burgos, Castile and León

== People ==
- Giovanni Carafa di Montorio (died 1561), Duke of Paliano
- Giovanni Rinaldi Montorio (died 1546), Bishop of Narni
- Pietro Francesco Montorio (1556–1643), Apostolic Nuncio to Germany and Bishop of Nicastro

== See also ==
- Montori (disambiguation)
- Montoro (disambiguation)
- Montuori
