= Torella =

Torella may refer to a pair of Italian municipalities:

- Torella dei Lombardi, in the Province of Avellino, Campania
- Torella del Sannio, in the Province of Campobasso, Molise

== See also ==
- Torello (disambiguation)
- Torelli
- Toro (disambiguation)
