= Marco Mattiucci =

Italian firefighter

Marco Mattiucci (1968 in Osimo – May 5, 1998, in Sarno) was a member of the Italian National Fire Department, and a recipient of the gold medal for civil valor.

== Biography ==
Former student of the Nunziatella Military School of Naples (course 196° years 1983-86) nicknamed Matteo and known for being the director of the students' choir, he was graduating in law when he chose to perform the year of conscription as a volunteer in the National Fire Department, which he joined on October 20, 1997. After six months of training at the central schools, he was assigned to the command of Salerno.

In this role, he rushed together with his team to help the populations of Sarno and Episcopio affected by the catastrophic flood event of May 5, 1998. He was engaged with his vehicle in the evacuation of some people when he received the order of withdrawal, consequent to the worsening of the risks of landslide of the area where he was.

However, he refused to leave the place and went to the rescue of some people, including a child, whose position he had taken over and managed to rescue them. Shortly afterwards, still engaged in rescue, he was swept away by the landslide together with his vehicle and was killed.

On May 4, 1999 he was awarded the gold medal for civil valor.

The city of Salerno has decided to honor its memory by dedicating a street and a bridge, Pinocchio Park area; the municipality of Sarno has dedicated the Civil Protection Multipurpose Center to it; and the Italian National Fire Corps has named the barracks of Salerno after him.

== Awards ==
Gold medal for civil valor

"On the occasion of a catastrophic landslide movement that swept through the town, with generous impetus it evacuated numerous inhabitants from the houses invaded by water and debris and rescued a child in danger. With tenacious and courageous determination, although aware of the looming, extreme danger, he continued the rescue work on board his vehicle, but was hit by a sudden wave of mud, being mortally injured in the cabin of the vehicle crashed into a tree. Splendid example of elected civic virtues and a very high sense of duty".

- Sarno (SA), May 5, 1998.
