= Napoletana goat =

Italian breed of goat

Napoletana
- Conservation status: FAO (2007): endangered; DAD-IS (2025): at risk/critical
- Country of origin: Italy
- Distribution: Campania
- Standard: MIPAAF
- Use: dual-purpose, milk and meat

Traits
- Weight: Male: 60–65 kg; Female: 50–55 kg
- Coat: usually black, occasionally deep red
- Horn status: small recurved horns in both sexes
- Goat; Capra aegagrus hircus

The Napoletana is an Italian breed of domestic goat from the area south of Naples, in Campania in southern Italy. It is raised on the slopes of Vesuvius, on the slopes of the Monti Lattari, and in the Agro Nocerino Sarnese which lies between them. The origin of the breed is unknown. It may derive from goats of African origin imported to the area in the early years of the twentieth century; the alternative name Torca Nera, "black Turkish goat", suggests an origin in the Mediterranean basin.

The Napoletana is one of the forty-three autochthonous Italian goat breeds of limited distribution for which a herdbook is kept by the Associazione Nazionale della Pastorizia, the Italian national association of sheep- and goat-breeders; the herdbook was established in 2002. The Napoletana was in the past numerous. By the early 1980s the population had fallen substantially, to 2000–3000. At the end of 2013 the registered population was reported as 71.

== Use ==
The milk yield of the Napoletana is high. In a lactation of 165 days it averages 350 litres for primiparous and 450 litres for pluriparous nannies. The milk has 4.7% milk-fat, 3.4% milk protein and contains 5% lactose. Kids are usually slaughtered at a weight of 9–12 kg.
