= Guillem Montoro =

Spanish politician, activist (born 1995)

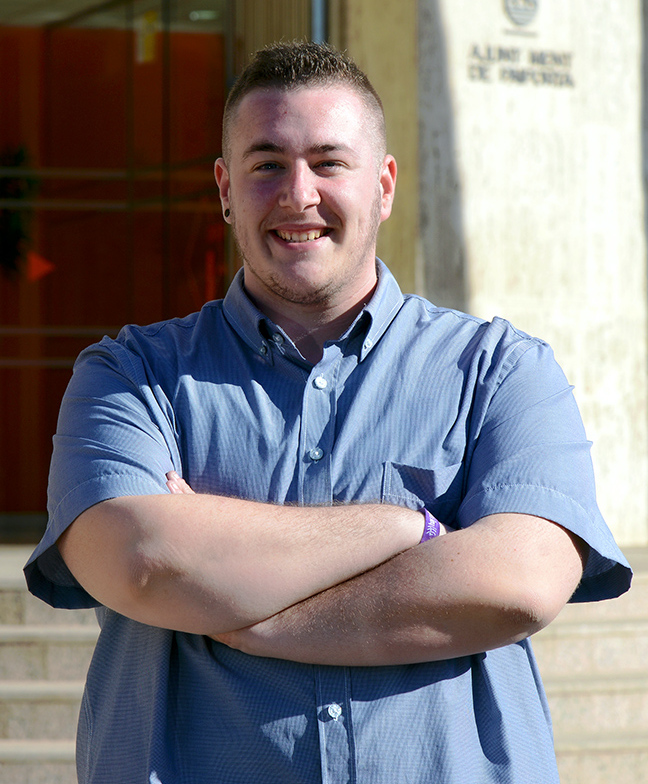
Image of Guillem Montoro

Guillem Montoro i López (born March 3, 1995, in Paiporta, Valencian Community) is a Spanish politician, equality technician, and LGBT rights activist. He served as a councillor in the Paiporta City Council for Compromís from 2018 to 2020, becoming the first openly trans man in Spain to hold this position.

== Biography ==
=== Public life ===
In April 2018, he published his first book, ¿Y si fueras tú? (What if it were you?), with Vínculo Editorial, co-written with Patricia Estellés, addressing school bullying and how to combat it.

In February 2018, after nearly three years, he was able to legally change his documents.

In December 2020, he was part of the short film jury at the 6th edition of Mostra La Ploma - Film and Culture Festival for Sexual, Gender and Family Diversity, organized by Col·lectiu Lambda, awarding Transversales directed by Jorge Garrido.

=== Political career ===
Montoro began his political journey with Compromís in the 2014 elections, appearing on the party's list for Paiporta, headed by Isabel Martín, who became mayor. He joined the governing team as councillor for Transparency, Modernization, and Citizen Participation, later taking on Social Welfare and Equality from 2015 to 2019.

In January 2018, he became the first transgender councillor in the Valencian Community, and the first openly trans councillor in Spain. At 22, he was also the youngest councillor in Paiporta at that time. He denounced online attacks over his gender identity.

He ran in the Compromís primaries for the Valencian Parliament in the Valencia constituency ahead of the 2019 elections.

In the May 2019 municipal elections, he was re-elected councillor in Paiporta with Compromís, led again by Mayor Isabel Martín. Their list was the second most voted.

On September 24, 2020, he resigned from his councillor role in Paiporta due to professional circumstances. He remained politically active, involved in a February 2022 dispute between Compromís and Daniela Requena, LGTBI secretary of the PSOE-PSPV, over a statement.

In December 2022, during the debate on the Law 4/2023 for Real and Effective Equality of Trans People and Guarantee of LGTBI Rights, Compromís MP Joan Baldoví gave his speech time to Montoro, who read his statement from the Spanish Parliament podium in support of the law, which passed in February 2023 with 191 votes in favor, 60 against, and 91 abstentions after over six months of debate.

In May 2023, Montoro was the target of a transphobic attack by VOX councillor Daniel Furió in Paiporta, who called the LGBT community “filthy trash” and directly insulted Montoro in a video on social media. The video was quickly condemned by Compromís Paiporta, who demanded its removal.

== Awards and recognition ==
The magazine Shangay named him one of the six most relevant LGBT youth activists of 2018, alongside figures like directors of La llamada, Javier Calvo and Javier Ambrossi, and poet Elvira Sastre.

That same year, he was the flag-bearer of the Thematic Year on trans realities of the Federación Estatal de Lesbianas, Gays, Transexuales y Bisexuales ('National Federation of Lesbians, Gays, Trans and Bisexuals', FELGTB).

In October 2024, FELGTB awarded him the 2024 Pluma Award, along with journalist Nerea Pérez de las Heras and influencer Perra de Satán, "for his LGTBI+ activism and visibility, becoming a reference for trans youth. Also for defending LGTBI+ rights through institutional politics, being the first openly trans councillor in Spain".
