= Castel San Giorgio =

- Comune
- Comune di Castel San Giorgio
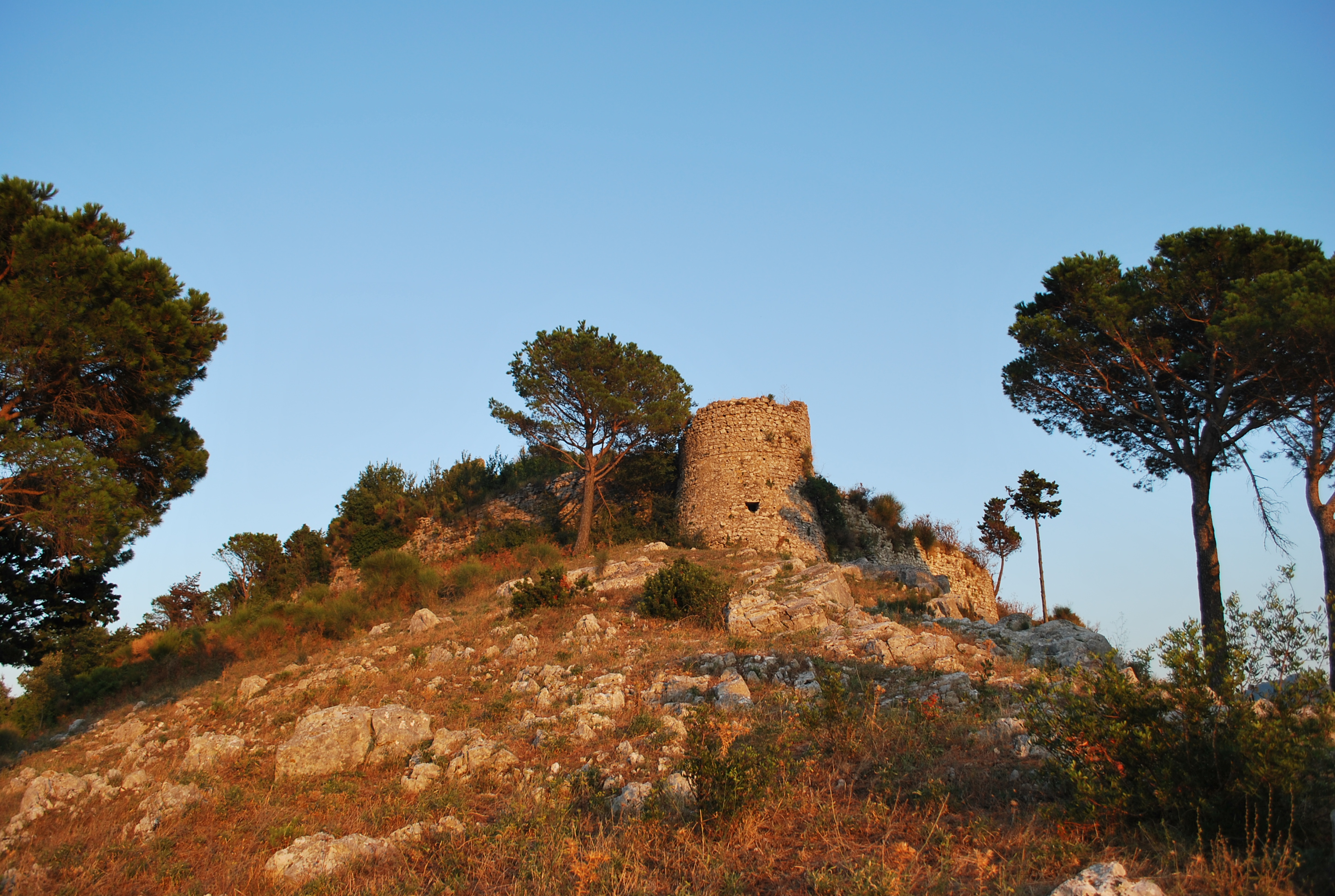
- The ruins of Monte Castello

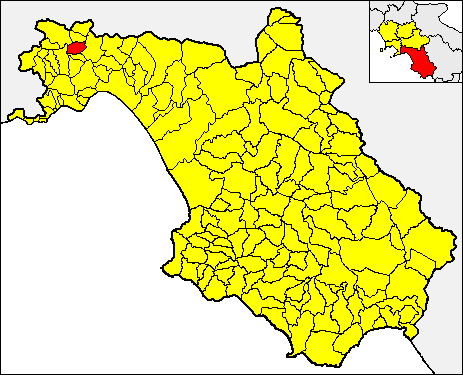
- Castel San Giorgio within the Province of Salerno

- Location within Italy Location within Campania
- Coordinates: 40°47′N 14°42′E
- Country: Italy
- Region: Campania
- Province: Salerno (SA)
- Frazioni: Aiello, Campomanfoli, Castelluccio, Cortedomini, Fimiani, Lanzara, Santa Croce, Santa Maria a Favore, Taverna-Casalnuovo, Torello, Trivio Codola

Government
  - Mayor: Paola Lanzara (Impegno Civico)

Area
  - Total: 13 km^{2} (5.0 sq mi)
- Elevation: 90 m (300 ft)

Population (2011)
  - Total: 13,411
  - Density: 1,000/km^{2} (2,700/sq mi)
- Demonym: Sangiorgesi
- Time zone: UTC+1 (CET)
  - Summer (DST): UTC+2 (CEST)
- Postal code: 84083
- Dialing code: 081
- ISTAT code: 065034
- Patron saint: St. Roch
- Saint day: 16 August
- Website: Official website

Castel San Giorgio (Campanian: Sangiorge) is a town and comune in the province of Salerno in the Campania region of south-western Italy. In 2011, it had a population of 13,411.

== History ==
The town, founded in 1810 and located near the site of the ancient Nuceria Alfaterna, was originally named San Giorgio, until 1861.

== Geography ==
The municipality borders with Mercato San Severino, Nocera Inferiore, Roccapiemonte, Sarno and Siano.

It counts eleven hamlets (frazioni): Aiello, Campomanfoli, Castelluccio, Cortedomini, Fimiani, Lanzara (the most populated one), Santa Croce, Santa Maria a Favore, Taverna-Casalnuovo, Torello and Trivio Codola (also named Codola).

== Transport ==
The municipality has 3 train stations (Castel San Giorgio-Roccapiemonte, Lanzara-Fimiani and Codola), on the line Mercato San Severino-Nocera Inferiore/Sarno. It is also served by the motorway A30 Salerno-Caserta, at the exit "Castel San Giorgio".

== Twin towns ==
- Mella, Cuba
- Šmartno pri Litiji, Slovenia
