= Cancello–Avellino railway =

Railway line in Campania, Italy

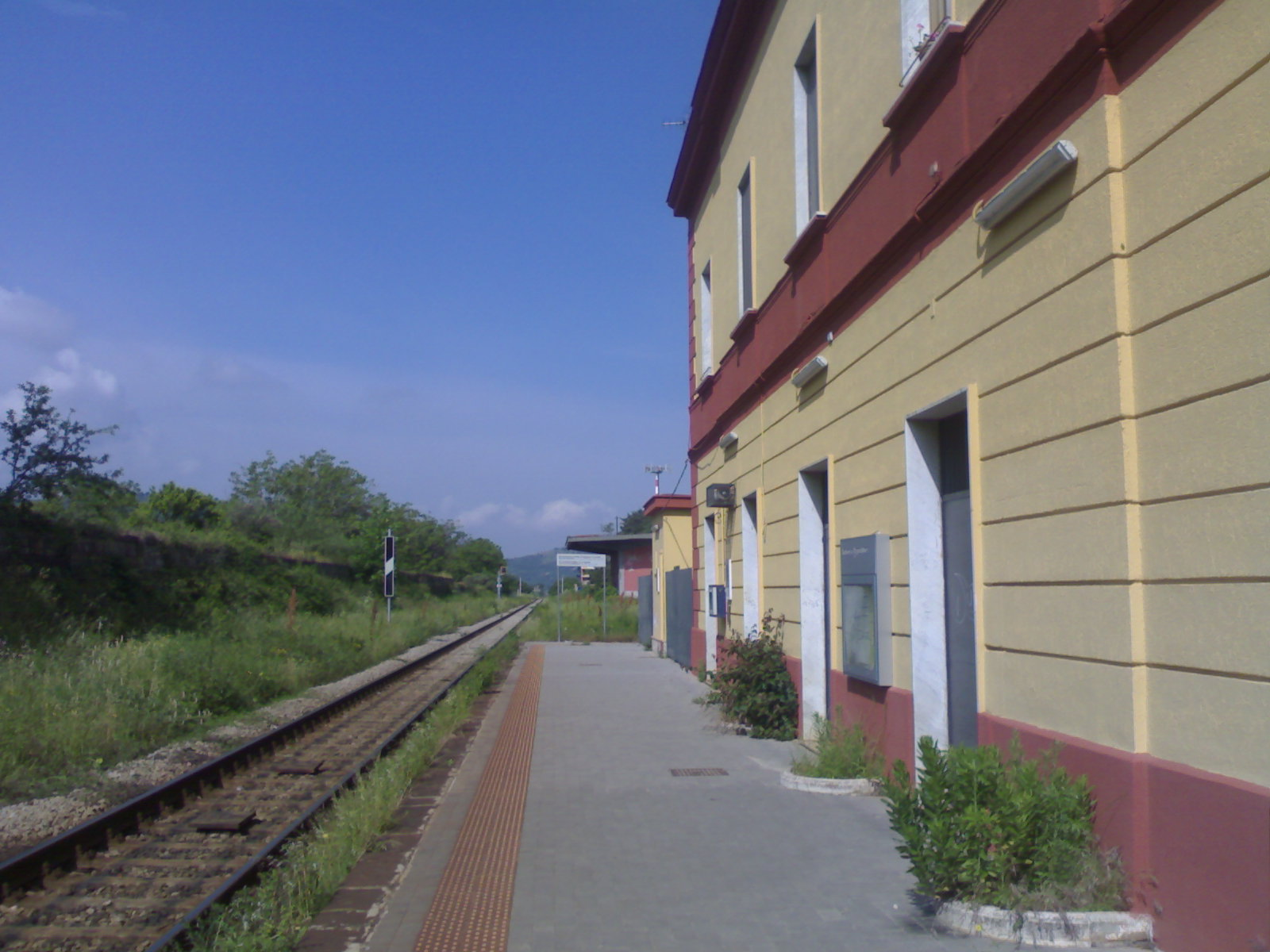
- The platform and track at Castel San Giorgio-Roccapiemonte in 2010

Overview
- Status: in use
- Owner: RFI
- Locale: Campania, Italy
- Termini: San Felice a Cancello; Avellino

Service
- Type: Heavy rail
- Operator(s): Trenitalia

History
- Opened: 1846

Technical
- Line length: 74 km (46 mi)
- Number of tracks: 1
- Track gauge: 1,435 mm (4 ft 8 1/2 in) standard gauge
- Electrification: 3 kV DC (Cancello–Codola)

The Cancello–Avellino railway is a railway line in Campania, Italy.

The first section of the line, between Cancello and Nola, was opened in 1846 while the last section between Montoro Inferiore and Avellino was completed in 1879.

== See also ==
- List of railway lines in Italy

== Bibliography ==
- RFI - Fascicolo linea 128
