= Montuori =

Montuori is an Italian surname. Notable people with the surname include:

- Carlo Montuori (1885–1968), Italian cinematographer
- Giovanni Montuori (born 1989), Italian drag performer under the name Lina Galore
- Luca Montuori (1859–1952), Italian general
- Mario Montuori (1920–1997), Italian cinematographer
- Miguel Montuori (1932–1998), Italian-Argentine footballer
- Nancy Montuori Stein, American film director and producer

== See also ==
- Montori (disambiguation)
- Montorio (disambiguation)
- Montoro (disambiguation)
- Montuoro
