= Giuseppe De Falco =

Italian politician

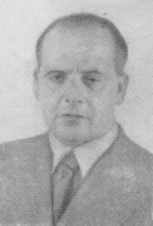
Giuseppe De Falco

Giuseppe De Falco (1 July 1908 - 25 September 1955) was an Italian politician.

== Biography ==
De Falco was born in Montoro Superiore. He represented the Common Man's Front in the Constituent Assembly of Italy from 1946 to 1948 and the Monarchist National Party in the Chamber of Deputies from 1953 to 1955.
