= Nancy Montuori Stein =

American film director

Nancy Montuori Stein is a film director and producer, best known for her film Stealing Innocence which has received more than 50 film festival awards. In 2009, Stein completed her feature film All Ages Night starring the American actress Katherine Carlsberg and the British actor and singer from Nightmare & The Cat, Django Stewart.
