= Montorio, Province of Burgos =

Montorio
- Municipality and town
- Location in Spain
- Coordinates: 42°35′02″N 3°46′36″W
- Country: Spain
- Autonomous community: Castile and León
- Province: Burgos
- Comarca: Odra-Pisuerga

Government
  - Mayor: Emilio Marcos Serna

Area
  - Total: 23.53 km^{2} (9.08 sq mi)
- Elevation: 944 m (3,097 ft)

Population (2025-01-01)
  - Total: 138
  - Density: 5.86/km^{2} (15.2/sq mi)
- Demonym: Montorianos
- Time zone: UTC+1 (CET)
  - Summer (DST): UTC+2 (CEST)
- Postal code: 09125
- Website: www.montorio.es

Montorio is a municipality and town located in the province of Burgos, Castile and León, North-central Spain. According to the 2009 data from INE, the municipality has a population of 200 inhabitants.
