= Montoro, Campania =

Montoro
- Comune
- Comune di Montoro
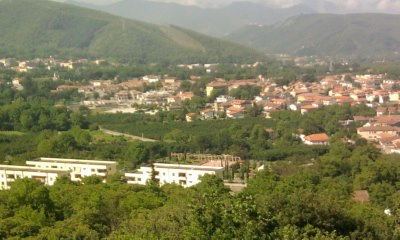
- Aerial view of Sant'Eustachio and San Pietro

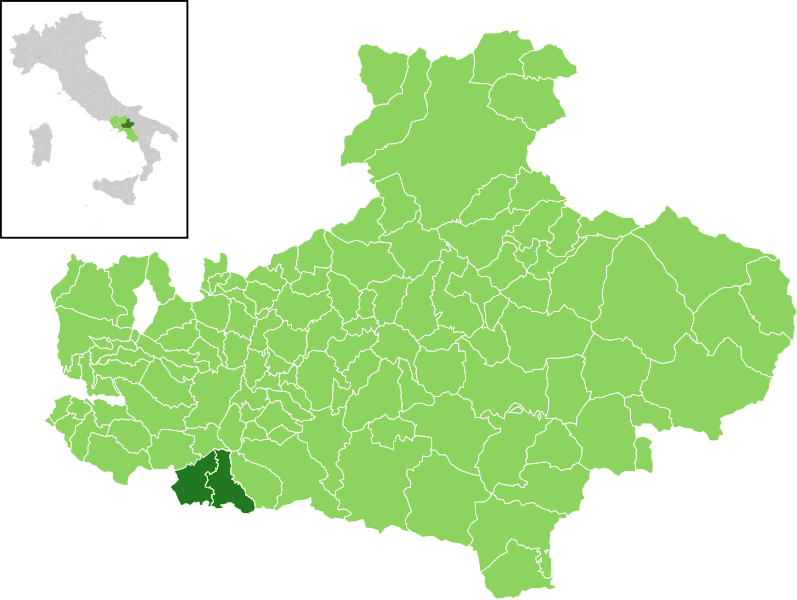
- Montoro within the Province of Avellino

- Location within Italy Location within Campania
- Coordinates: 40°49′18.1″N 14°45′35.9″E
- Country: Italy
- Region: Campania
- Province: Avellino (AV)
- Frazioni: Aterrana, Banzano, Borgo, Caliano, Chiusa, Figlioli, Misciano, Piano (municipal seat), Piazza di Pandola, Preturo, San Bartolomeo, San Felice, San Pietro, Sant'Eustachio, Torchiati

Government
  - Mayor: Mario Bianchino

Area
  - Total: 40.14 km^{2} (15.50 sq mi)
- Elevation: 190 m (620 ft)

Population (30 November 2017)
  - Total: 19,776
  - Density: 492.7/km^{2} (1,276/sq mi)
- Demonym: Montoresi
- Time zone: UTC+1 (CET)
  - Summer (DST): UTC+2 (CEST)
- Postal code: 83025
- Dialing code: 0825
- Patron saint: St. Nicholas of Tolentino
- Saint day: 10 September
- Website: Official website

Montoro (Neapolitan: Muntuorë; Montorese: Montorë) is an Italian comune (municipality) of the province of Avellino, Campania. The municipal seat is in the town of Piano.

== History ==
Following a referendum, the municipality was officially created on 3 December 2013, after the merging of Montoro Inferiore and Montoro Superiore. In 2015, it gains the town status thanks to a presidential decree signed by Sergio Mattarella.

== Geography ==
The municipality is located in the southwestern area of its province, at the borders with the Province of Salerno. It borders with the municipalities of Bracigliano, Calvanico, Contrada, Fisciano, Forino, Mercato San Severino and Solofra.

== Transport ==
The municipality is served by 3 railway stations on the Benevento-Avellino-Salerno line: Montoro-Forino (located in Piano), Borgo, and Montoro Superiore (located between Torchiati and Banzano).

It counts two exits on the RA2 motorway Salerno-Avellino: "Montoro Sud", formerly named "Montoro Inferiore", is located near Piazza di Pandola. "Montoro Nord", formerly "Montoro Superiore", is located near Torchiati.

== People ==
- Agostino Cardamone (b. 1965), boxer
- Giuseppe De Falco (1908-1955), politician
- Lionello De Felice (1916-1989), film director
