= Montoro Superiore =

Italian commune

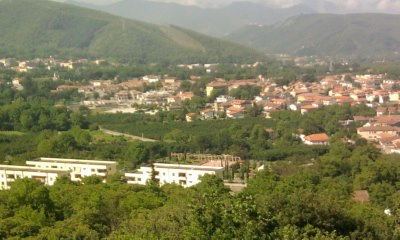
Montoro Superiore

Montoro Superiore was a town and former comune (municipality) in the province of Avellino, Campania, Italy.

Following a referendum, the municipality was officially disestablished on 3 December 2013; after being merged, with Montoro Inferiore, in the new municipality of Montoro.

== People ==
- Giuseppe De Falco (1908-1955), politician

== See also ==
- Montoro, Campania
- Montoro Inferiore
