= Jafet Torelli =

Italian ceramist and sculptor

Jafet Torelli (died 1898) was an Italian ceramist and sculptor.

He was born and lived in Florence where he mainly completed works in ceramic.

Torelli studied at the Academy of Fine Arts of Florence in 1857. At the end of his studies he focused on sculpture, and he won an award for his ingenuity in a bas-relief. From there, he traveled to Paris in 1860, to work with cavaliere Giuseppe Deverà, who later became a professor at the Accademia Albertina of Turin. In 1865, Torelli was hired by the firm of Ginori, as a designer for his ceramic factories, and was prolific in porcelain and maiolica designs, many displayed at the 1867 Universal Exposition of Paris: among them were a table set with glasses, plate, and candlesticks, all with figures of gardeners and ornaments. Ginori then assigned him to the Doccia Porcelain factory, as head designer and modeller, and manager of the plant. Continuing great models both in pots and in the majolica, he was awarded the medal of collaboration at the 1873 Exposition of Vienna.

He branched out on his own, opening in 1874 the Porta San Frediano, a factory of terra cotta statuettes, producing glazed majolica in different genres both ancient and modern. Torelli needed a special furnace for his work, and designed the cylindrical furnace himself. Torelli made a stucco statuary group of an episode of the Battle of Palestro, with Vittorio Emanuele on horseback leading a charge, and the Zouaves dissuading him from entering into the danger.

In 1873, he was awarded at Vienna; in 1877, in Naples and Florence; in 1878 again in Vienna and in Paris. At the Melbourne and in Sydney (Australia) expositions, he was conferred a first class medal. In 1881 at Florence, he was awarded two silver medals by the Society of Horticulture, and in 1883, the same Society gave him a first class medal. At the 1889 Exposition of Horticulture, he exhibited a Dante Alighieri and Beatrice Portinari.
