= Achille Torelli =

Achille Torelli (May 5, 1841 – January 31, 1922) was an Italian playwright.

He was born in Naples to Anna Maria Tomasi di Lampedusa, who was Giuseppe Tomasi di Lampedusa's aunt, and Vincenzo Torelli, a well-known journalist, librettist, writer, editor and impresario of Arbëreshë descent. His first success was the comedy, After Death written at the age of seventeen, and acted at Naples and then at Turin. This was succeeded by several comedies, most of which were successful.

Torelli volunteered for the Italian army in the campaign of 1866, and was laid up for several months in consequence of a fall from his horse at Custoza. He later produced a long list of plays, both tragedies and comedies, of which perhaps the best is Triste Realtà (1871) which won the applause of the veteran Manzoni. Angelo de Gubernatis considered Torelli's I Mariti a masterpiece although few would consider it a comedy.

Torelli lived a very retired life, spending most of his time in study and writing. He died in 1922.
