= Daniela Requena =

Spanish writer, journalist, and transgender rights activist (born 1992)

Daniela Requena Esteve (born 1992 in Valencia) is a writer, journalist, social media influencer, and activist for the rights of transgender people in Spain. In 2022, she published the autobiographical Mamá, soy mujer. Diario de una chica trans (Mom, I'm a woman. Diary of a trans girl). Requena participated in the Spanish reality tv show Nightmare in Paradise (2022), finishing 3rd. She has appeared on other television shows.

== Biography ==
She studied journalism at the Complutense University of Madrid. In her career as a communicator, she has participated in Antena 3's Espejo Público as a contributor, and she hosts her own sex advice podcast on Spotify called X preguntas.

As an activist, she has been secretary of the LGTBI and Diversity area of the PSOE of Valencia.

In 2022, she published Mamá, soy mujer. Diario de una chica trans (Mom, I'm a woman. Diary of a trans girl), an autobiographical book. In this book, she recounts her experience of growing up, beginning to feel gender dysphoria in adolescence, and eventually taking steps to be a woman. Requena has discussed the importance of telling the positive experiences of transgender people like herself.

Requena participated in the Spanish reality tv show Nightmare in Paradise (2022) which aired on Telecinco. She was on the show for 119 days and received 3rd place.

In 2023, Requena underwent a controversial corneal tattooing operation to change her eye color from dark brown to blue. She shared extensive details of the experience on social media, receiving both positive and negative responses, and generating considerable discussion on the risks of the operation.

== Television career ==
Year	Program	Media	Notes
2018	“Saturday Deluxe”	Telecinco	Editor
2021	Gente maravillosa	Canal Sur	Guest
2021; 2023	Viernes Deluxe	Telecinco	Guest
2021 - 2022	Espejo público	Antena 3	Contributor
2022	Viva la vida	Telecinco	Guest
2022 - 2023	Pesadilla en El Paraíso	Telecinco	Contestant - 3rd finalist (2022)
2022 - 2023	Pesadilla en El Paraíso	Telecinco	Contributor (2023)
2023	¡Fiesta!	Telecinco	Guest
2023	Solos/Solas	Mitele PLUS	Participant (9 days)
2023 - 2024	Som de Casa	À punt	Contributor
2024	Socialité	Telecinco	Editor and reporter
2024 - 2025	Palabra de Honor	Canal 13	Contestant - 17th eliminated
2025	Bona Vesprada	À punt	Contributor

== Publications ==
- Mamá, soy mujer. Diario de una chica trans (Mom, I'm a woman. Diary of a trans girl) (2022, Editorial Planeta)
