= Quindici =

- Comune
- Comune di Quindici
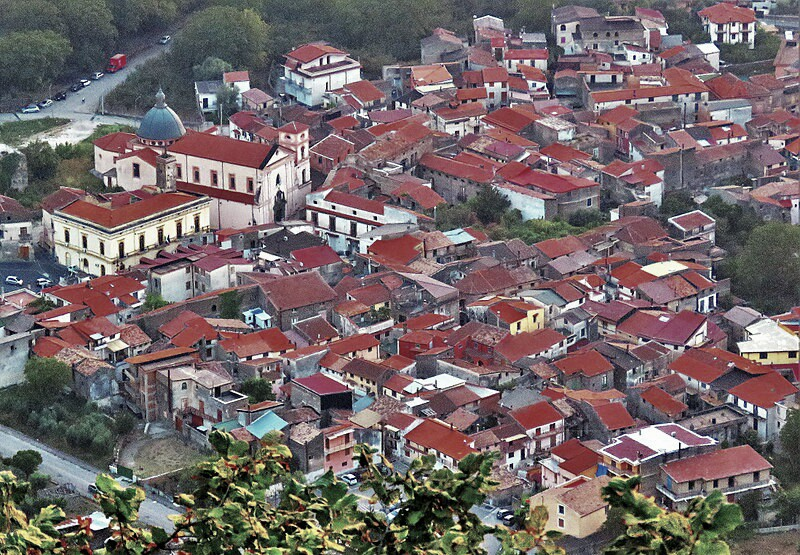

- Location within Italy Location within Campania
- Coordinates: 40°52′N 14°39′E
- Country: Italy
- Region: Campania
- Province: Avellino (AV)

Area
  - Total: 23 km^{2} (8.9 sq mi)

Population (2018-01-01)
  - Total: 3,040
  - Density: 130/km^{2} (340/sq mi)
- Demonym: Quindicese
- Time zone: UTC+1 (CET)
  - Summer (DST): UTC+2 (CEST)
- Postal code: 83020
- Dialing code: 081

Quindici is a town and comune of the province of Avellino in the Campania region of southern Italy. Its population is about 3,000 inhabitants.

Bracigliano, Forino, Lauro, Moschiano, Sarno and Siano are nearby towns.

== History ==
Quindici has been inhabited by Ausonians, Osci, Etruscans, Greeks and Samnites, followed by the Romans who named the village Quindecim. The name Quindici, implying fifteen, is derived from the Latin word ‘Quindecim’.

A local legend states that the town was founded by fifteen deserters of Barbarossa's army during the Middle Ages. This legend is unfounded; archeological evidence suggests that human settlements in the area date back to pre-Roman times. Original settlers were likely Samnites from either the Pentri, Carricini, Caudini or Irpini tribes.

The Fusco clan, a subset of the Pentris, were early settlers and became one of Quindici's principal families. Legend suggests they were the lead clan of fifteen, preying on merchant caravans that made the trek overland from the coastal city of Barium after offloading goods from the east. The modern Italian surname "Fusco" is a derivative from Fuscus, meaning "dark one". The family is still represented in Quindici although many emigrated to the US in the early 20th century.

Both the Fusco and Graziano clans vied for control of the town and region for many years with heads of both families claiming to be 'Boss' at various times. The Graziano family left for the new world in the late 1800s, leaving the Fusco family in control until their emigration ca. 1920.

There are many immigrant families from Quindici who settled in the north eastern area of the US, especially to Lawrence, MA, New Jersey, towns of Hoboken and Paterson, Springfield, MA, and Utica, NY. There is also a significant population of Quindicese living in Connecticut.

Over the years, and continuing today, rival clans have fought for control of Quindici. These include the Bonavita, Santaniello, Cava, Vivenzio, Scibelli, Tranghese, Siniscalchi, Grasso, Fusco, Graziano, and Manzi families.

== Festivals ==
The town has one or two processions or feasts each month.

The principal church is that of the town's patron saint, Maria S.S. Delle Grazie (Our Lady of Grace). Her feast day is held on 8 September.

The feast for San Sebastiano (St. Sebastian) and for San Antonio Abate (St. Anthony the Abbot, Anthony the Great, St. Anthony of Egypt) is held on 17 January and is accompanied by large bonfires.

In an open space near the church of St Anthony the Abbot, local farmers bring their livestock and drivers bring their vehicles to be blessed by parish priests.

Other town festivals include St. Lucia and St. Aniello in June; the Feast for the Immaculate Conception in December; the Feast of the Corpus Domini in July; and the Reenactment of the Death of Jesus Christ, accompanied by a late night procession around town, during Holy Week.

The Church of St Theodore is located on a nearby peak 240 metres (800 ft) above the town. The Visitation takes place the day after Easter Sunday. The celebration includes a small procession by the chapel's statue of St Theodore and around the outskirts of the church.

Next to this church is a house where the Hermit of St Theodore resides. A Quindicese, he has the key of the monastery/church.
