= Codex diplomaticus cavensis =

Codex diplomaticus Cavensis
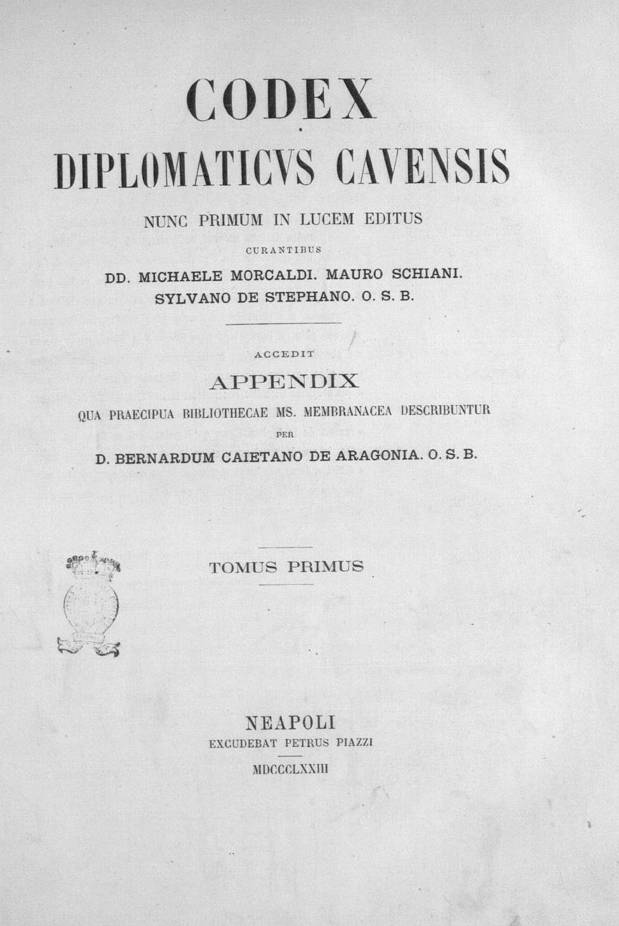
- Codex diplomaticus cavensis
- Author: Michele Morcaldi Mauro Schiani, Silvano De Stefano
- Language: Italian
- Publication date: 1873
- Publication place: Italy

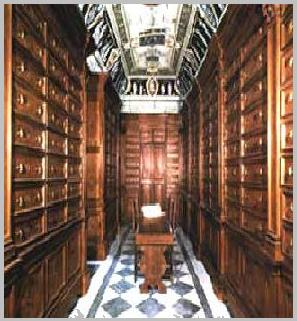
The Archive of Cava de' Tirreni Abbey

The Codex diplomaticus cavensis (CDC bibliographic abbreviation; in Italian: the diplomatic code of the Cavense, or Cavese) is an editorial project active in the field of the history of medieval Italy and Langobardia Minor, which began in 1873 and continued with an irregular trend. The project pursues the objective of exhaustive publication of the entire diplomatic and documentary corpus kept in the archive of the Benedictine Abbey of the Holy Trinity, located in Cava de 'Tirreni. The consistency of the archive spans over 15,000 parchments, starting with the first writing that dates back to 792. To this membranous patrimony there is to be added a substantial amount of documents on paper.

== History ==
The printed collection of archival documents began in 1873, with the edition of the first volume of the work. The project continued until 1893, the year in which it stopped, after the eighth volume was printed. The chronological interval covered by the first 8 volumes started from the year 792 and reached up to 1065. The edition of the eight nineteenth century tomes is due to three monks of the abbey, Michele Morcaldi, the main author, Mauro Schiani and Silvano De Stefano.

The resumption of publications took place about a century later, in the years from 1984 to 1990, in which two new volumes, the ninth and the tenth, were completed, edited by Giovanni Vitolo, a medievalist of the University of Naples Federico II, and by archivist Simeone Leone. The two volumes extended the edition to the series of documents dated from 1065 to 1080.

The contents of the first ten volumes add up to a total of 1669 published archival documents.

=== 19th-century edition ===
- Piazzi, ed. (1873). Codex diplomaticus cavensis – I (in Latin). Naples.
- Hoepli, ed. (1875). Codex diplomaticus cavensis – II (in Latin). Naples.
- Hoepli, ed. (1876). Codex diplomaticus cavensis – III (in Latin). Naples.
- Hoepli, ed. (1877). Codex diplomaticus cavensis – IV (in Latin). Naples.
- Hoepli, ed. (1878). Codex diplomaticus cavensis – V (in Latin). Naples.
- Hoepli, ed. (1884). Codex diplomaticus cavensis – VI (in Latin). Naples.

=== 20th-century edition ===
The second series is edited by Giovanni Vitolo and Simeone Leone and includes the two added volumes published in 1984 and 1990.

- CDC, Vol. IX, (aa. 1065–1072), Cava de' Tirreni, 1984
- CDC, Vol. X, (aa. 1073–1080), Cava de' Tirreni, 1990

=== 21st-century edition ===
The volumes of the Codex diplomaticus Cavensis from the first to the tenth can be downloaded and consulted online by accessing the website ALIM – Archive of the Italian Latinity of the Middle Ages, maintained by an inter-university collaboration involving the Italian universities of University of Milan, University of Naples Federico II, University of Palermo, Roma Tre University, University of Venice, University of Verona.
The third edition with last two volumes, the eleventh and twelfth, edited by Carmine Carlone, Leone Morinelli and Giovanni Vitolo, released in 2015 to cover the chronological period from 1081 to 1090, was possible thanks to a loan granted by the municipality of Cava de 'Tirreni and an agreement with the abbey on 22 May 2009.

- CDC, Vol. I, (aa. 792–960), Naples, 1873
- CDC, Vol. II, (aa. 983–993), Naples, 1875
- CDC, Vol. III, (aa. 993–1000), Naples, 1876
- CDC, Vol. IV, (aa. 1001–1018), Naples, 1877
- CDC, Vol. V, (aa. 1018–1034), Naples, 1878
- CDC, Vol. VI, (aa. 1034–1045), Naples, 1884
- CDC, Vol. VII, (aa. 1046–1056), Naples, 1888
- CDC, Vol. VIII, (aa. 1057–1065), Naples, 1893
- CDC, Vol. IX, (aa. 1065–1072), Cava de' Tirreni, 1984
- CDC, Vol. X, (aa. 1073–1080), Cava de' Tirreni, 1990
- CDC, Vol. XI, (aa. 1081–1085), Salerno, 2015
- CDC, Vol. XII (aa. 1086–1090), Salerno, 2015

== See also ==
- Cava de' Tirreni, Italy
- La Trinità della Cava
- Biblioteca statale del Monumento Nazionale Badia di Cava
