= Roccapiemonte =

- Comune
- Comune di Roccapiemonte
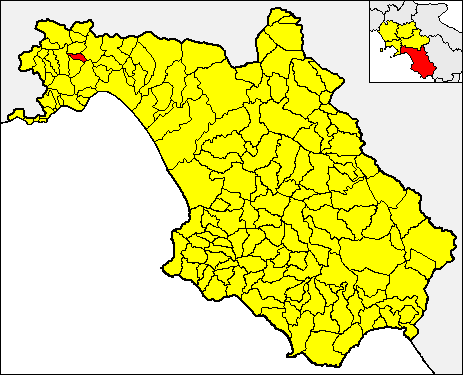
- Roccapiemonte within the Province of Salerno

- Location within Italy Location within Campania
- Coordinates: 40°45′N 14°41′E
- Country: Italy
- Region: Campania
- Province: Salerno (SA)
- Frazioni: Casali, San Potito

Area
  - Total: 5.22 km^{2} (2.02 sq mi)
- Elevation: 86 m (282 ft)

Population (31 December 2004)
  - Total: 9,263
  - Density: 1,770/km^{2} (4,600/sq mi)
- Time zone: UTC+1 (CET)
  - Summer (DST): UTC+2 (CEST)
- Postal code: 84086
- Dialing code: 081
- Patron saint: San Giovanni Battista
- Website: Official website

Roccapiemonte (Campanian: 'A Rocca) is a town and comune in the province of Salerno in the Campania region of south-western Italy.

== Geography ==
Located in the east of the Agro Nocerino Sarnese, it borders with the towns of Castel San Giorgio, Cava de' Tirreni, Mercato San Severino, Nocera Inferiore and Nocera Superiore. The hamlets (frazioni) are Casali and San Potito.

== Demography ==
Historical population

Year	Pop.	±%
1861	3,744	—
1871	3,819	+2.0%
1881	3,926	+2.8%
1901	4,375	+11.4%
1911	4,371	−0.1%

Year	Pop.	±%
1921	4,745	+8.6%
1931	5,022	+5.8%
1936	5,296	+5.5%
1951	5,804	+9.6%
1961	6,373	+9.8%

Year	Pop.	±%
1971	6,693	+5.0%
1981	7,762	+16.0%
1991	8,751	+12.7%
2001	9,113	+4.1%

Source: Data from ISTAT
