= Mar Montoro =

Spanish presenter

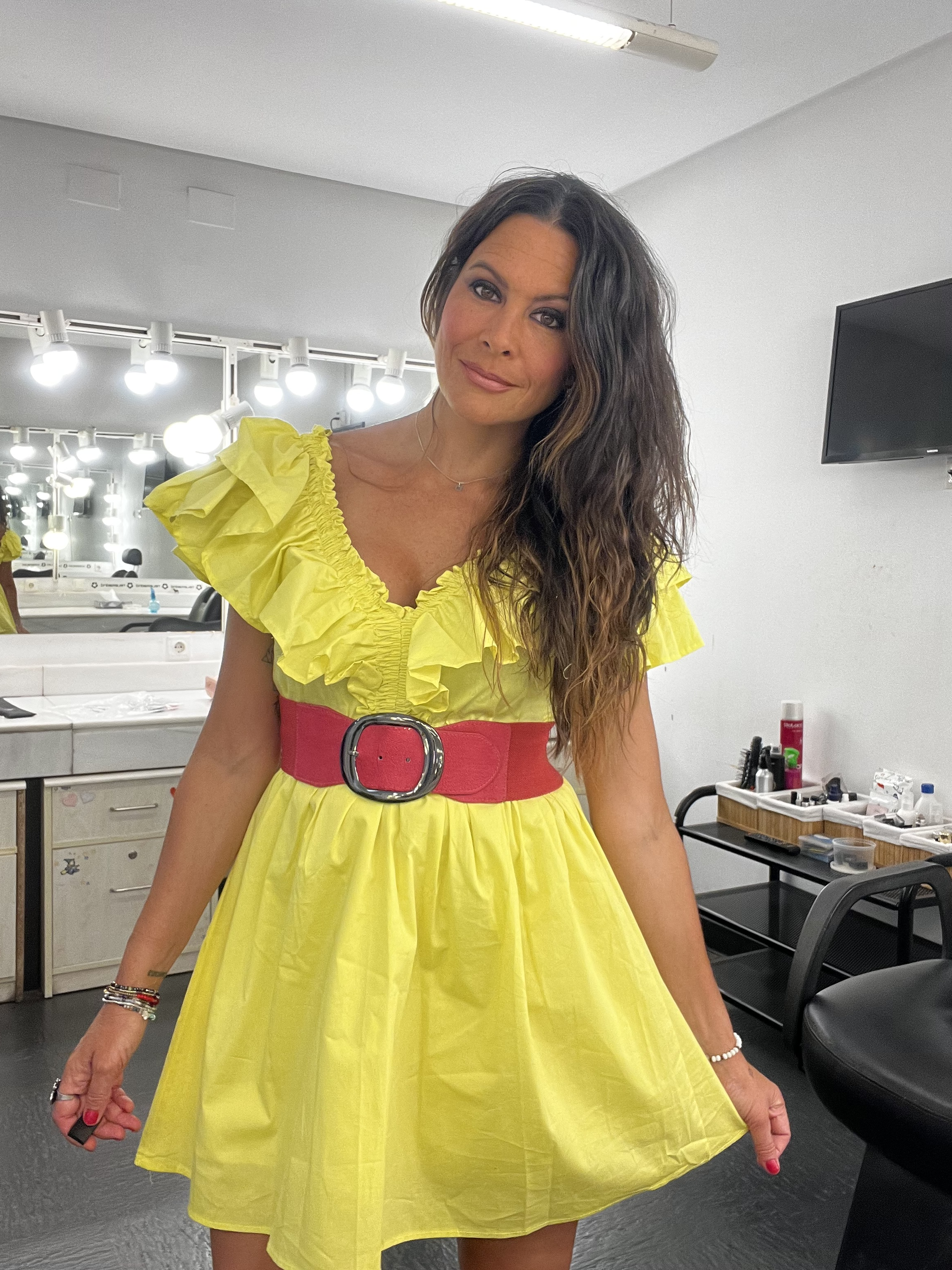
Mar Montoro in 2022

Mar Montoro is a Spanish TV and radio presenter.

== Personal life ==
Mar Montoro was born on 10 August 1977 in Madrid, Spain.

She married her boyfriend Javi Castano in 2013.

== Career ==
In 1992, she recorded a children's programme about Seville Expo for a French television channel. She then began working at 40 Principales Seville radio station.

From 1998, she signed with 40 Principales Madrid. She worked as a television presenter as host of 40 TV and Canal Plus and on radio, where she hosted in La Mar de Noches and Fan Club Madrid.

In 2001, she began to work in Cadena Dial as presenter of Dial Tal Cual and produced an evening programme, El sitio de mi recreo for the same station. She collaborated on the TV channel Localia TV.

In March 2011, she appeared on the cover of Interviu magazine. In 2012, she published a book named for her radio show, La Mar de Noches.

In March 2013, she worked as a adviser for the Telecinco program, Mujeres y Hombres y Viceversa.

On 9 July 2014 Montoro left PRISA Radio after 22 years.
