= Montoro Inferiore =

Communes of Italy

Montoro Inferiore is a former comune (municipality) in the province of Avellino, Campania, Italy.

Following a referendum, the municipality was officially disestablished on 3 December 2013; after being merged, with Montoro Superiore, in the new municipality of Montoro.

== See also ==
- Montoro, Campania
- Montoro Superiore
