= Sarno =

Town in Salerno, Italy

- Comune
- Comune di Sarno
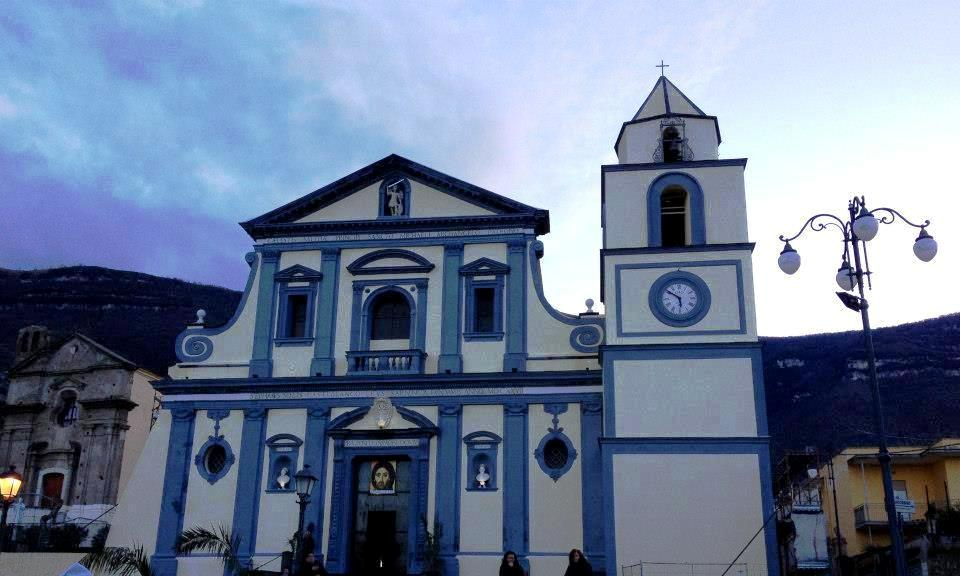
- St. Michael's Cathedral

- Coat of arms

- Location within Italy Location within Campania
- Coordinates: 40°49′N 14°37′E
- Country: Italy
- Region: Campania
- Province: Salerno (SA)
- Frazioni: Foce, Episcopio, Lavorate

Government
  - Mayor: Francesco Squillante (Democratic Party)

Area
  - Total: 39 km^{2} (15 sq mi)
- Elevation: 30 m (98 ft)

Population (31 449)
  - Total: 31,463
  - Density: 810/km^{2} (2,100/sq mi)
- Demonym: Sarnesi
- Time zone: UTC+1 (CET)
  - Summer (DST): UTC+2 (CEST)
- Postal code: 84087
- Dialing code: 081
- Patron saint: St. Michael
- Saint day: May 8
- Website: Official website

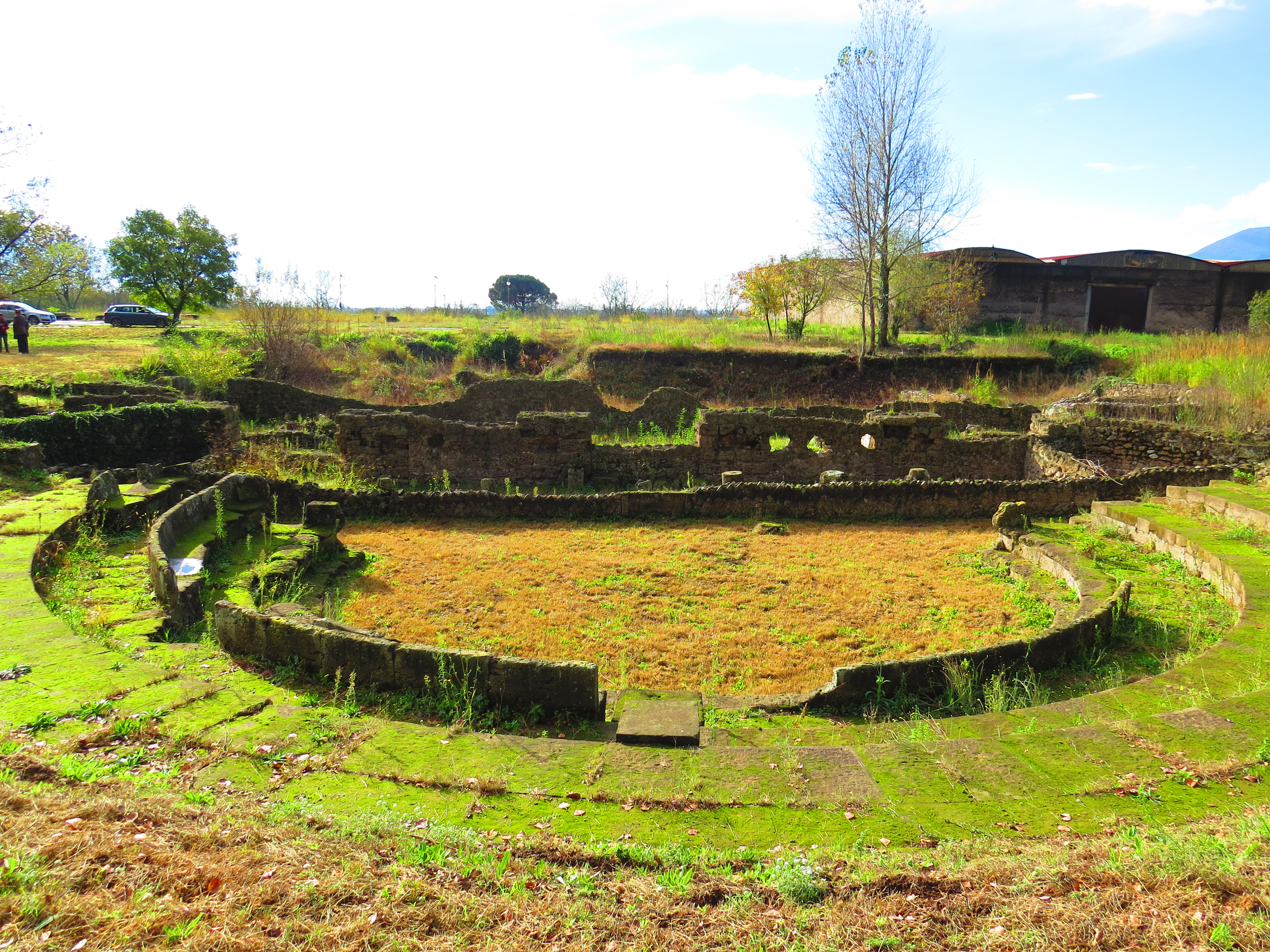
Roman Theatre of Sarno

Sarno is a town and comune and former Latin Catholic bishopric of Campania, Italy, in the province of Salerno, 20 km northeast from the city of Salerno and 60 km east of Naples by the main railway.

== Overview ==
It lies at the foot of the Apennine Mountains, near the sources of the Sarno River, called Sarnus in ancient times, a stream connected by canal with Pompei and the sea.

Paper, cotton, silk, linen and hemp are manufactured. The travertine which forms round the springs of the Sarno was used even at ancient Pompeii as building material.

== History ==
The area of Sarno has been inhabited since the Neolithic, and in pre-historical times housed Oscan and Samnites settlements. Later it was acquired by the Romans, who held it until the fall of the Western Roman Empire in the 5th century AD. The first nucleus of the future Sarno grew in the 8th century around a castle founded by the Lombards of Benevento.

Before its incorporation into the domains of the crown of Naples, Sarno gave its name to a county held in succession by the Orsini, Coppola, Tuttavilla, and Colonna families.

On May 5, 1998, Sarno and the neighbouring villages of Quindici, Siano and Bracigliano were devastated by a series of landslides. One hundred eighty houses were destroyed, 450 were severely damaged, and 161 people died in what was one of the worst catastrophes of its kind in modern Italy. The landslides had been caused by several days of torrential rainfalls but were also blamed on agricultural, residential, industrial overexploitation, and the lack of any substantial environmental programs. The catastrophe prompted the Italian Ministry of the Environment to introduce legislative measures for environmental protection which have come to be known as legge Sarno.

== Ecclesiastical history ==
The Diocese of Sarno was established circa 1000 AD, presumably as suffragan of the Roman Catholic Archdiocese of Oristano. In 1534 it lost territory to the Diocese of Nola. The neighbouring bishopric of Cava de' Tirreni was held in personal union with Sarno (united aeque principaliter) from 27 June 1818 till 25 September 1972.

Suppressed on 30 September 1986, its territory and title being merged into the thus renamed Diocese of Nocera Inferiore-Sarno.

=== Episcopal ordinaries ===
Suffragan Bishops of Sarno (without ordinals; first incumbent(s) lacking?)

- Riso (1066? – ?)
- Giovanni (1111–1118)
- Giovanni (1119–1134)
- Pietro (1134–1156)
- Giovanni (1156–1180)
- Unfrido (1180–1202)
- Tibaldo (1201–1208)
- Ruggiero (1209–1216)
- Giovanni (1216–1224)
- Giovanni (1224–1258)
- Angelo d’Aquino (1258–1265)
- Giovanni (1265–1296)
- Guglielmo (1296–1309)
- Ruggiero De Canalibus (1310–1316)
- Ruggiero (1316–1316)
- Ruggiero De Miramonte (1316–1324)
- Antonio da Ancona (1324–1326)
- Napoleone (1326–1330)
- Nicola (1330 – death 1333)
- Francesco, Friars Minor (O.F.M.) (13 March 1333 – 1340)
- Napoleone (1340–1350)
- Teobaldo (25 April 1350 – 1370)
- Giovanni (1372–1404)
- Giovanni (1404–1407)
- Francesco Mormile (1407–1408), later Bishop of Cava (Italy) (1408–1419)
- Giovanni (1408–1414)
- Francesco Anconitano (1414–1419)
- Marco da Teramo (29 December 1418 – death 1439); previously Bishop of Monopoli (Italy) (24 March 1400 – 15 December 1404), Bishop of Bertinoro (Italy) (15 December 1404 – 29 December 1418)
- Andrea da Nola (23 October 1439 – 1454)
- Ludovico Dell'Aquila (1454–1470)
- Antonio de' Pazzi (1475 – 26 February 1477), later Bishop of Mileto (Italy) (26 February 1477 – death 1479)
- Giovanni da Viterbo (30 September 1478 – 16 February 1481), later Bishop of Crotone (Italy) (16 February 1481 – death 25 November 1496)
- Andrea De Ruggiero (16 February 1481 – 1482)
- Andrea Dei Pazzi (16 February 1482 – 1498)
- Agostino Tuttavilla (1498–1501)
- Giorgio Maccafani de' Pireto (1501–1516), previously Bishop of Civita Castellana e Orte (Italy) (24 September 1498 – 1501)

== Main sights ==
Sarno has the ruins of a medieval castle, which belonged to Count Francesco Coppola, who took an important part in the conspiracy of the barons against Ferdinand II of Aragon in 1485. Walter III of Brienne is buried in the ancient church of Santa Maria della Foce, rebuilt in 1701. Sarno Cathedral is near the town centre.

== Sources and external links ==
- GCatholic, with incumbent bio links
- Media related to Sarno at Wikimedia Commons
