= Siano =

- Comune
- Comune di Siano
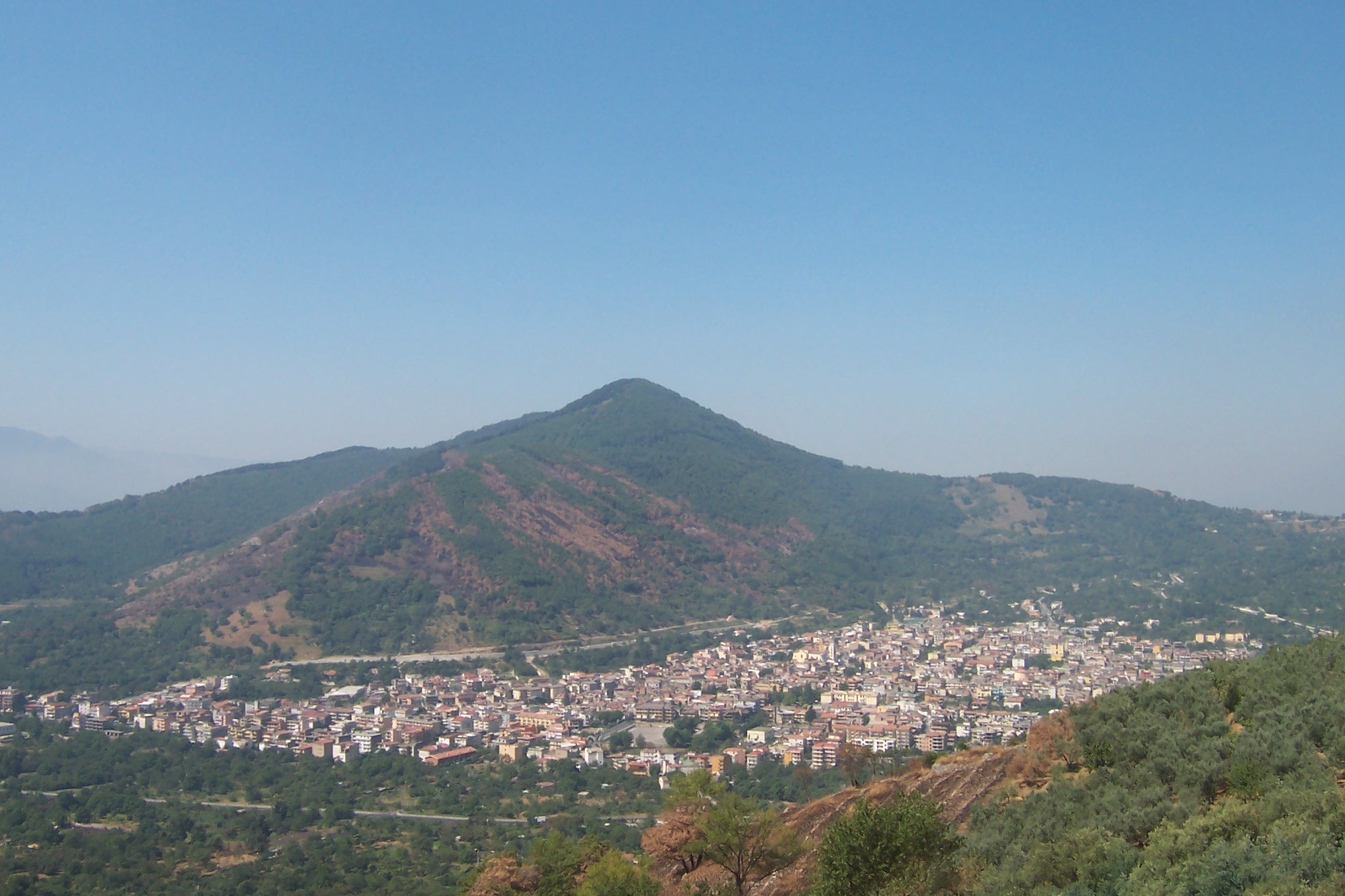

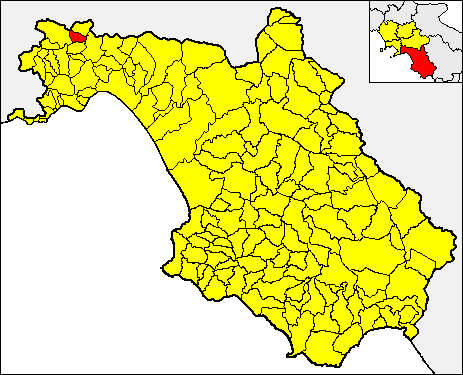
- Siano within the Province of Salerno

- Location within Italy Location within Campania
- Coordinates: 40°48′9″N 14°41′40″E
- Country: Italy
- Region: Campania
- Province: Salerno (SA)

Area
  - Total: 8.47 km^{2} (3.27 sq mi)
- Elevation: 126 m (413 ft)

Population (1 April 2009)
  - Total: 10,354
  - Density: 1,220/km^{2} (3,170/sq mi)
- Demonym: Sianesi
- Time zone: UTC+1 (CET)
  - Summer (DST): UTC+2 (CEST)
- Postal code: 84088
- Dialing code: 081
- ISTAT code: 065142
- Patron saint: San Rocco
- Saint day: 16 August
- Website: Official website

Siano is a town and comune in the province of Salerno in the Campania region of south-western Italy.

== Geography ==
The municipality has its borders with Bracigliano, Castel San Giorgio, Mercato San Severino, Quindici (AV) and Sarno.
