= Mercato San Severino =

- Comune
- Comune di Mercato San Severino
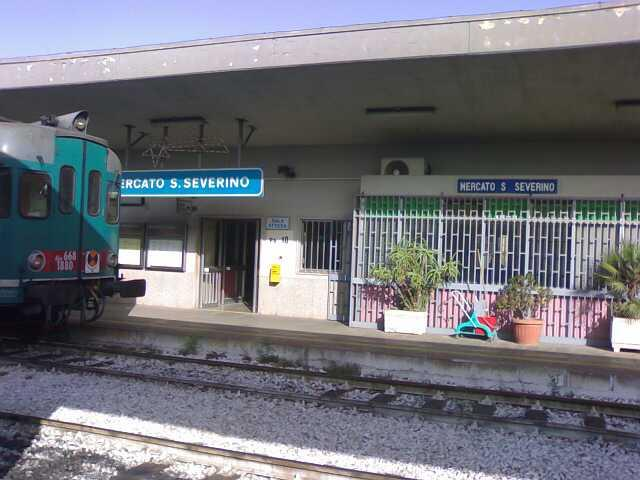
- Railway station

- Coat of arms

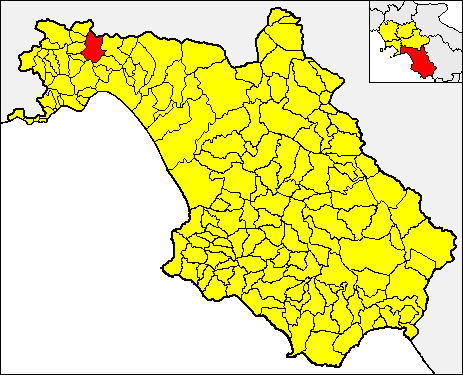
- Mercato San Severino within the Province of Salerno

- Location within Italy Location within Campania
- Coordinates: 40°47′N 14°45′E
- Country: Italy
- Region: Campania
- Province: Salerno (SA)
- Frazioni: Acigliano, Acquarola, Capocasale, Carifi, Ciorani, Corticelle, Costa, Curteri, Galdo di Carifi, Lombardi, Monticelli di Sopra, Monticelli di Sotto, Oscato, Ospizio, Pandola, Piazza del Galdo, Priscoli, Sant'Angelo in Macerata, Sant'Eustachio, San Vincenzo, Spiano, Torello, Valle-Marigliano.

Government
  - Mayor: Antonio Somma

Area
  - Total: 30.33 km^{2} (11.71 sq mi)
- Elevation: 146 m (479 ft)

Population (1 April 2009)
  - Total: 21,625
  - Density: 713.0/km^{2} (1,847/sq mi)
- Demonym(s): Sanseverinesi, Rotensi, Sanseveritani
- Time zone: UTC+1 (CET)
  - Summer (DST): UTC+2 (CEST)
- Postal code: 84085
- Dialing code: 089
- Patron saint: St. Roch
- Saint day: 16 August
- Website: Official website

Mercato San Severino (Sanseverinese: Sanzuverin') is a town and comune of the province of Salerno in the Campania region of south-west Italy.

Mercato San Severino shares borders with the municipalities of Baronissi, Bracigliano, Castel San Giorgio, Cava de' Tirreni, Fisciano, Montoro, Roccapiemonte and Siano.

== Transport ==
Mercato San Severino is served by two railway stations: Mercato San Severino is located in the middle of the town, on the lines Salerno-Mercato San Severino, Cancello-Benevento via Avellino and Mercato San Severino-Nocera Inferiore. On this second line is located the stop of Valle, in the same-named suburb of Sant'Angelo in Macerata.

It is served by the A30 motorway (Salerno-Caserta) at the same-named exit (located near Curteri), and also by the RA 02 (Salerno-Avellino) at the exit "Fisciano-Mercato San Severino".

== Twin towns ==
- Farébersviller (France)

== Personalities ==
- Antonio Somma (1923-2005), partisan, Director of the CGIL trade union, official in the Italian Communist Party from 1951 to 1989.
- Gennaro Maria Sarnelli (1702-1744), redemptorist, blessed.
