= Bracigliano =

- Comune
- Comune di Bracigliano
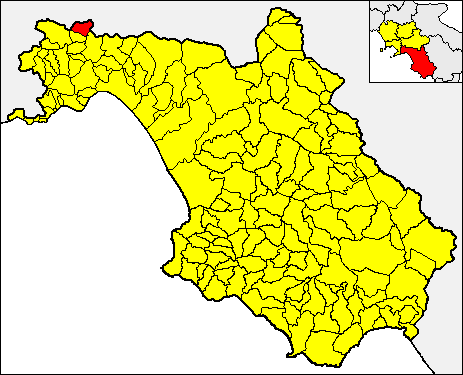
- Bracigliano within the Province of Salerno

- Location within Italy Location within Campania
- Coordinates: 40°49′N 14°42′E
- Country: Italy
- Region: Campania
- Province: Salerno (SA)
- Frazioni: Casa Danise, Casale, Manzi, Masseria, Pero, San Nazario, Santa Lucia, Spineto, Tuoro

Government
  - Mayor: Antonio Rescigno

Area
  - Total: 14 km^{2} (5.4 sq mi)
- Elevation: 327 m (1,073 ft)

Population (28 February 2017)
  - Total: 5,546
  - Density: 400/km^{2} (1,000/sq mi)
- Demonym: Braciglianesi
- Time zone: UTC+1 (CET)
  - Summer (DST): UTC+2 (CEST)
- Postal code: 84082
- Dialing code: 081
- ISTAT code: 065016
- Patron saint: San Giovanni Battista
- Saint day: 24 June
- Website: Official website

Bracigliano is a town and comune in the province of Salerno in the Campania region of south-western Italy.

The municipality borders Forino, Mercato San Severino, Montoro, Quindici and Siano.

== Notable people ==
- Adolfo Bruno (1945–2003), former caporegime in the Genovese crime family
