= Giovio =

Giovio is a surname. Notable people with the surname include:

- Giulio Giovio (1511–1563), Italian Roman Catholic bishop
- Paolo Giovio (1483–1552), Italian physician, historian, biographer, and prelate
- Paolo Giovio (il Giovane) (died 1585), Italian Roman Catholic bishop
