= Giacobazzi =

Giacobazzi is an Italian surname. Notable people with the surname include:

- Andrea Giacobazzi (died 1524), Italian Roman Catholic bishop
- Anthony Giacobazzi, French rugby union player
- Cristoforo Giacobazzi (died 1540), Italian Roman Catholic bishop and cardinal
- Domenico Giacobazzi (1444–1528), Italian Roman Catholic bishop and cardinal
