= Priscus (saint) =

Name of several Catholic saints and martyrs

Priscus is one of several Catholic saints and martyrs. In the 1921 Benedictine Book of Saints there are seven figures named Priscus mentioned.

There are different feast days involved. In some confusion, he is said to be the first Bishop of Capua, a martyr of the third century, and an African bishop; but the sources have been cast into doubt, and even the century is unclear in some accounts.

== March 28 ==
The martyr was put to death in 260 under Valerian, with Malchus and Alexander.

== May 9 ==
Priscus of Nocera, first bishop of Nocera (is also distinguished from the Bishop of Capua).

== May 26 ==
Priscus, a Roman legionary officer, was put to death in 272 in France, under Aurelian.

== September 1 ==
Priscus of Capua is recognized as a martyr who died in Capua along the Aquarian Road in the fourth century.

However, there is another story that Priscus was an African bishop in the fifth century and died after being cast adrift. This story is considered unreliable.

== October 1 ==
Priscus, Crescens, and Evagrius were martyrs, put to death in Tomi, on the Black Sea.

== See also ==
- San Prisco
