= Francesco Negri (Antitrinitarian) =

Italian Protestant reformer

Francesco Negri (1500 in Bassano – 1563) was an Italian Protestant reformer and exile in Switzerland, then Poland. He was first a Benedictine at the Monastery of Santa Giustina in Padua, then in 1525 left for Germany. He was then Calvinist, finally an Antitrinitarian. His main work is the drama The Free Will 1546.

== Biography ==
Francesco Negri was born to a noble and ancient family in Bassano, in the Republic of Venice, in 1500. Gifted with an active and penetrating mind, he became an excellent student. He entered the Order of Benedictines. The principles of the Reformation preached in Germany and Switzerland penetrating Italy at this time, Negri came forward as one of the first to adopt the new doctrines, and promptly abandoning his order, he went to Germany, joined Zwingli and accompanied the Swiss Reformer to the conferences of Marburg in 1529, and assisted at the Diet of Augsburg in 1530. Negri defended with eloquence the famous Protestant profession of faith known under the name of the Augsburg Confession. He afterwards returned to Italy; but that country offering no security to the preachers of the Reformed doctrines, he went back to Germany. He stopped some time at Strasbourg, then at Geneva, and finally settled at Chiavenna, a small village of the Grisons, where he married, and became the teacher of a school. His small salary scarcely sufficed to support his family. It appears that he attempted to better his position by going again to Geneva, but he was not more fortunate than before, and he returned to Chiavenna, where he died sometime posterior to 1559. In his last years, Negri departed from the theological platform of his old teachers, Luther and Zwingli, and embraced Socinianism.

== Works ==
- Turcicarum rerum commentarius (Paris, 1538), a translation of Paolo Giovio’s Comentario de le cose de' Turchi from Italian into Latin.
- Rudimenta grammaticae, ex auctoribus collecta (Milan, 1541), reprinted under the title of Canones Grammaticales (Peschiaro, 1555).
- Ovidii Metamorphosis in epitomen phaleucis versibus redacta (Zurich, 1542; Basel, 1544).
- Tragoedia de libero arbitrio (Geneva, 1546, 4to, and 1550, with additions). This singular dramatic allegory upon one of the most disputed questions between the Catholics and the Reformers is rare and recherche; the denouement of the piece is the triumph of Justifying Grace over king Free Will, who is beheaded, and over the Pope, who is recognised as Antichrist. The drama was translated into French under the title La tragedie du roi Franc-Arbitre (Villefranche [Geneva], 1559).
- De Fanini Faventini ac Dominici Bassanensis morte, qui nuper ob Christum in Italia Romani pontificis jussu impie occisi sunt, brevis historia (Chiavenna, 1550), one of his rarest and most curious books.
- Historia Francisci Spierae civitatulani qui quod susceptam semel Evangelicae veritatis professionem abnegasset, in horrendam incidit desperationem (Tiibingen, 1555).

== Bibliography ==
- This article incorporates public domain material from McClintock, John; Strong, James (1867–1887). Cyclopædia of Biblical, Theological and Ecclesiastical Literature. Harper and Brothers.
- Roberti, Giambattista (1839). Notizie storico-critiche della vita e delle opere di Francesco Negri, apostata Bassanese del secolo XVI. Bassano.
- Hoefer, Ferdinand (ed.). Nouvelle Biographie Générale. Vol. 27. pp. 618, 619.
