= Jovius =

Jovius may refer to:

== People ==
- Jovius (fl. 410), praetorian prefect of Italy under Emperor Honorius during the Sack of Rome
- Jovius, a nickname adopted by Roman Emperor Diocletian
- Paolo Giovio, (1528–1552), an Italian physician, historian, biographer, and prelate
