= Giacomazzi =

Giacomazzi is an Italian surname. Notable people with the surname include:

- Giovanni Giacomazzi (1928–1995), Italian footballer
- Guillermo Giacomazzi (born 1977), Uruguayan footballer

== See also ==
- Giacobazzi
