= Vincenzo della Marra =

Catholic bishop from Italy

Most Reverend Vincenzo della Marra
- Bishop of Alessano
- Church: Catholic Church
- Diocese: Diocese of Alessano
- In office: 1695–1712
- Predecessor: Andrea Tontoli
- Successor: Giovanni Giannelli

Orders
- Consecration: 23 May 1695 by Ferdinando d'Adda

Personal details
- Born: 1645 Naples, Italy
- Died: 27 April 1712 (age 67) Alessano, Italy

Vincenzo della Marra, C.R.L. (1645 – 27 Apr 1712) was a Roman Catholic prelate who served as Bishop of Alessano (1695–1712).

== Biography ==
Vincenzo della Marra was born in 1645 in Naples, Italy and ordained a priest in the Canons Regular of the Congregation of the Most Holy Saviour of the Lateran. On 16 May 1695, he was appointed during the papacy of Pope Innocent XII as Bishop of Alessano. On 23 May 1695, he was consecrated bishop by Ferdinando d'Adda, Cardinal-Priest of San Clemente, with Carolus de Tilly, Bishop of Acerra, and Sebastiano Perissi, Bishop of Nocera de' Pagani, serving as co-consecrators. He served as Bishop of Alessano until his death on 27 April 1712.

== External links and additional sources ==
- Cheney, David M. "Diocese of Alessano". Catholic-Hierarchy.org. (for Chronology of Bishops) ^{[self-published]}
- Chow, Gabriel. "Titular Episcopal See of Alessano (Italy)". GCatholic.org. (for Chronology of Bishops) ^{[self-published]}

Catholic Church titles
Preceded by Andrea Tontoli	Bishop of Alessano; 1695–1712	Succeeded by Giovanni Giannelli
