= Bernardino Orsini =

Italian Roman Catholic prelate

Most Reverend Bernardino Orsini
- Bishop of Nocera de' Pagani
- Church: Catholic Church
- Diocese: Diocese of Nocera de' Pagani
- In office: 1503–1511
- Predecessor: Pietro Strambone
- Successor: Domenico Giacobazzi

Personal details
- Died: 1511

Bernardino Orsini (died 1511) was a Roman Catholic prelate who served as Bishop of Nocera de' Pagani (1503–1511).

== Biography ==
On 7 May 1503, Bernardino Orsini was appointed during the papacy of Pope Alexander VI as Bishop of Nocera de' Pagani. He served as Bishop of Nocera de' Pagani until his death in 1511.

== External links and additional sources ==
- Cheney, David M. "Diocese of Nocera Inferiore-Sarno". Catholic-Hierarchy.org. (for Chronology of Bishops) ^{[self-published]}
- Chow, Gabriel. "Diocese of Nocera Inferiore-Sarno (Italy)". GCatholic.org. (for Chronology of Bishops) ^{[self-published]}

Catholic Church titles
Preceded by Pietro Strambone	Bishop of Nocera de' Pagani; 1503-1511	Succeeded by Domenico Giacobazzi
