= Antonio Bolognini =

Italian Roman Catholic prelate

Most Reverend Antonio Bolognini
- Bishop of Foligno
- Church: Catholic Church
- Diocese: Diocese of Foligno
- In office: 1444–1461
- Predecessor: Bartolomeo Caetani
- Successor: Antonio Bertini
- Previous post: Nocera de' Pagani (1438–1444)

Personal details
- Died: 1461 Foligno, Italy

Antonio Bolognini (died 1461) was a Roman Catholic prelate who served as Bishop of Foligno (1444–1461) and Bishop of Nocera de' Pagani (1438–1444).

== Biography ==
On 19 March 1438, Antonio Bolognini was appointed during the papacy of Pope Eugene IV as Bishop of Nocera de' Pagani. On 31 August 1444, he was appointed during the papacy of Pope Eugene IV as Bishop of Foligno. He served as Bishop of Foligno until his death in 1461.

While bishop, he was the principal co-consecrator of Francesco Oddi de Tuderto, Bishop of Assisi (1445).

== External links and additional sources ==
- Cheney, David M. "Diocese of Nocera Inferiore-Sarno". Catholic-Hierarchy.org. (for Chronology of Bishops) ^{[self-published]}
- Chow, Gabriel. "Diocese of Nocera Inferiore-Sarno". GCatholic.org. (for Chronology of Bishops) ^{[self-published]}
- Cheney, David M. "Diocese of Foligno". Catholic-Hierarchy.org. (for Chronology of Bishops) ^{[self-published]}
- Chow, Gabriel. "Diocese of Foligno (Italy)". GCatholic.org. (for Chronology of Bishops) ^{[self-published]}

Catholic Church titles
| Preceded by | Bishop of Nocera de' Pagani; 1438–1444 | Succeeded by Giovanni Marcolini |
| Preceded by Bartolomeo Caetani | Bishop of Foligno; 1444–1461 | Succeeded by Antonio Bertini |
