= Giovanni Marcolini =

Italian Roman Catholic bishop (died 1465)

Most Reverend Giovanni Marcolini
- Bishop of Nocera de' Pagani
- Church: Catholic Church
- Diocese: Diocese of Nocera de' Pagani
- In office: 1444–1465
- Predecessor: Antonio Bolognini
- Successor: Pietro Strambone

Personal details
- Died: 1465

Giovanni Marcolini, O.F.M. (died 1465) was a Roman Catholic prelate who served as Bishop of Nocera de' Pagani (1444–1465).

== Biography ==
Giovanni Marcolini was appointed a priest in the Order of Friars Minor. On 6 November 1444, he was appointed during the papacy of Pope Paul II as Bishop of Nocera de' Pagani. He served as Bishop of Nocera de' Pagani until his death in 1465.

While bishop, he was the principal co-consecrator of Francesco Oddi de Tuderto, Bishop of Assisi (1445).

== External links and additional sources ==
- Cheney, David M. "Diocese of Nocera Inferiore-Sarno". Catholic-Hierarchy.org. (for Chronology of Bishops) ^{[self-published]}
- Chow, Gabriel. "Diocese of Nocera Inferiore-Sarno (Italy)". GCatholic.org. (for Chronology of Bishops) ^{[self-published]}

Catholic Church titles
Preceded by Antonio Bolognini	Bishop of Nocera de' Pagani; 1444–1465	Succeeded by Pietro Strambone
