= Ippolito Franconi =

Most Reverend Ippolito Franconi
- Bishop of Nocera de' Pagani
- Church: Catholic Church
- Diocese: Diocese of Nocera de' Pagani
- In office: 1632–1653
- Predecessor: Francesco Trivulzio
- Successor: Bonaventura D'Avalos

Orders
- Ordination: 28 October 1631
- Consecration: 25 January 1632 by Antonio Marcello Barberini

Personal details
- Born: 1593 Agnone, Italy
- Died: 1653 (age 60)

Ippolito Franconi (1593–1653) was a Roman Catholic prelate who served as Bishop of Nocera de' Pagani (1632–1653).

== Biography ==
Ippolito Franconi was born in Agnone, Italy and ordained a priest on 28 October 1631. On 19 January 1632, he was appointed during the papacy of Pope Urban VIII as Bishop of Nocera de' Pagani. On 25 January 1632, he was consecrated bishop by Antonio Marcello Barberini, Cardinal-Priest of Sant'Onofrio, with Antonio Provana, Archbishop of Turin, and Giovanni Francesco Passionei, Bishop of Cagli, serving as co-consecrators. He served as Bishop of Nocera de' Pagani until his death in 1653.

While bishop, he was the principal co-consecrator of Roberto Fontana, Bishop of Modena (1645) and Gregorio Coppino, Bishop of Sant'Angelo dei Lombardi e Bisaccia (1645).

== External links and additional sources ==
- Cheney, David M. "Diocese of Nocera Inferiore-Sarno". Catholic-Hierarchy.org. (for Chronology of Bishops) ^{[self-published]}
- Chow, Gabriel. "Diocese of Nocera Inferiore-Sarno (Italy)". GCatholic.org. (for Chronology of Bishops) ^{[self-published]}

Catholic Church titles
Preceded by Francesco Trivulzio	Bishop of Nocera de' Pagani; 1632–1653	Succeeded by Bonaventura D'Avalos
