= Giulio Giovio =

Italian Roman Catholic bishop (1511–1563)

- Bishop of Nocera de' Pagani
- Church: Catholic Church
- Diocese: Diocese of Nocera de' Pagani
- In office: 1552–1563
- Predecessor: Paolo Giovio (il Vecchio)
- Successor: Paolo Giovio (il Giovane)

Personal details
- Born: 1511
- Died: 1573 (age 52)

Giulio Giovio (1511–1563) was a Roman Catholic prelate who served as Bishop of Nocera de' Pagani (1552–1563).

== Biography ==
Giulio Giovio was born in 1511. On 21 August 1551, he was appointed during the papacy of Pope Julius III as Coadjutor Bishop of Nocera de' Pagani. He succeeded to the bishopric on 11 December 1552. On 8 December 1553, he was consecrated bishop by Giovanni Giacomo Barba, Bishop of Teramo, with Antonio Numai, Bishop of Isernia, and Giulio Gentile, Bishop of Vulturara e Montecorvino, serving as co-consecrators. He served as Bishop of Nocera de' Pagani until his resignation in December 1560. He died in 1573.

While bishop, Giivio was the principal co-consecrator of Giovanni Antonio Volpi, Bishop of Como (1559).

== External links and additional sources ==
- Cheney, David M. "Diocese of Nocera Inferiore-Sarno". Catholic-Hierarchy.org. (for Chronology of Bishops) ^{[self-published]}
- Chow, Gabriel. "Diocese of Nocera Inferiore-Sarno (Italy)". GCatholic.org. (for Chronology of Bishops) ^{[self-published]}

Catholic Church titles
Preceded by Paolo Giovio (il Vecchio)	Bishop of Nocera de' Pagani; 1552–1563	Succeeded by Paolo Giovio (il Giovane)
