= Sebastiano Perissi =

Italian Roman Catholic bishop (1631–1701)

Most Reverend Sebastiano Perissi
- Bishop of Grosseto
- Church: Catholic Church
- Diocese: Diocese of Grosseto
- In office: 1700–1701
- Predecessor: Cesare Ugolini
- Successor: Giacomo Falconetti
- Previous post: Bishop of Nocera de' Pagani (1692–1700)

Orders
- Consecration: 20 January 1692 by Bandino Panciatici

Personal details
- Born: 1631 Boccheggiano, Grand Duchy of Tuscany
- Died: November 1701 (age 70) Grosseto, Grand Duchy of Tuscany

Sebastiano Perissi (1631 – November 1701) was a Roman Catholic prelate who served as Bishop of Grosseto (1700–1701) and Bishop of Nocera de' Pagani (1692–1700).

== Biography ==
Sebastiano Perissi was born in Boccheggiano, Italy in 1631, but raised in Siena. Perissi obtained the degree of Doctor in utroque iure in Siena. He was Auditor in the nunciature in Florence, and then Vicar General of Naples. On 9 January 1692, he was appointed during the papacy of Pope Innocent XII as Bishop of Nocera de' Pagani. On 20 January 1692, he was consecrated bishop by Bandino Panciatici, Cardinal-Priest of San Pancrazio, with Giuseppe de Lazzara, Bishop of Alife, and Giuseppe Felice Barlacci, Bishop Emeritus of Narni, serving as co-consecrators. On 28 May 1700, he was appointed during the papacy of Pope Innocent XII as Bishop of Grosseto. He served as Bishop of Grosseto until his death in November 1701.

== Episcopal succession ==
While bishop, he was the principal co-consecrator of:

- Giovanni Stefano Pastori, Bishop of Ventimiglia (1695);
- Vincenzo della Marra, Bishop of Alessano (1695);
- Daniele Scoppa, Bishop of Nola (1695).

== External links and additional sources ==
- Cheney, David M. "Diocese of Grosseto". Catholic-Hierarchy.org. (for Chronology of Bishops) ^{[self-published]}
- Chow, Gabriel. "Diocese of Grosseto (Italy)". GCatholic.org. (for Chronology of Bishops) ^{[self-published]}
- Cheney, David M. "Diocese of Nocera Inferiore-Sarno". Catholic-Hierarchy.org. (for Chronology of Bishops) ^{[self-published]}
- Chow, Gabriel. "Diocese of Nocera Inferiore-Sarno (Italy)". GCatholic.org. (for Chronology of Bishops) ^{[self-published]}

Catholic Church titles
Preceded by Emiddio Lenti	Bishop of Nocera de' Pagani; 1692–1700	Succeeded by Giovanbattista Carafa
Preceded by Cesare Ugolini	Bishop of Grosseto; 1700–1701	Succeeded by Giacomo Falconetti
