= Comentario de le cose de' Turchi =

1532 treatise by Paolo Giovio

The Comentario de le cose de' Turchi (modern Italian: Commentario delle cose dei Turchi, 'Commentary on the matters of the Turks') is a short treatise written by Paolo Giovio and first published in 1532 in Rome. The work is addressed to Charles V, Holy Roman Emperor, and was published at a time when the campaigns of Suleiman the Magnificent were threatening Europe.

Peter Madsen considers the Comentario to have been probably the “most important among the writings that analyzed the Ottoman military strength” at that time. Giovo also aimed to explain the rise of the Ottoman Empire in his treatise, as stated in his introductory letter to Charles V,

in order to make it easier for the captains and masters of war to find the true remedies against their forces and arts, and for the Christian soldier, by the examples of the past, to arrive at a better and more adequate discipline for defeating them [...].

Within a decade, the work was translated into Latin by Francesco Negri, (Note: Turcicarum rerum commentarius, published in 1537.) and Negri's translation was in turn translated into German by Justus Jonas. (Note: Ursprung des Türckhischen Reychs, biß auff den yetzigen Soliman, in Wälscher spraach geschriben, hernach auß dem Latein F. Bassianatis verteütschet durch Justum Jonam, published in 1538.) Another Latin translation was provided by the Hungarian archbishop Antonius Verantius, who later also travelled to Constantinople as diplomat for Ferdinand I. of Hapsburg thus gaining his own impression of the Ottomans. Giovo's treatise was "widely read" in Europe.

== Sources ==
- Furno, Martine (2017). "La traduction latine du Commentario de le cose de' Turchi de Paolo Giovio : desseins politiques et destin historiographique (1537-1577)". Astérion (in French). 16. doi:10.4000/asterion.2920.
- Madsen, Peter (2019). "Introduction" (PDF). Nordic Journal of Renaissance Studies. 16.
- Birnbaum, Marianna D. (1986), Humanists in a Shattered World: Croatian and Hungarian Latinity in the Sixteenth Century, Columbus (OH): Slavica
