= Anthony Giacobazzi =

French rugby union player

Anthony Giacobazzi is a French rugby union player, born 15 June 1988 in Toulon (Var), who plays as scrum half for RC Toulonnais (1.75 metres (5 ft 9 in), 83 kilograms (183 lb)).

He was at the pôle espoir à Marcoussis for the 2006-2007 season.

== Career ==
- Since 2007 : RC Toulon

== Honours ==
- France – U18 and U19
