= Andrea Giacobazzi =

Italian Roman Catholic prelate

Most Reverend Andrea Giacobazzi
- Bishop of Nocera de' Pagani
- Church: Catholic Church
- Diocese: Diocese of Nocera de' Pagani
- In office: 1517–1524
- Predecessor: Domenico Giacobazzi
- Successor: Domenico Giacobazzi

Personal details
- Died: 1524

Andrea Giacobazzi (died 1524) was a Roman Catholic prelate who served as Bishop of Nocera de' Pagani (1517–1524).

== Biography ==
On 14 August 1517, Andrea Giacobazzi was appointed during the papacy of Pope Leo X as Bishop of Nocera de' Pagani. He served as Bishop of Nocera de' Pagani until his death in 1524.

== External links and additional sources ==
- Cheney, David M. "Diocese of Nocera Inferiore-Sarno". Catholic-Hierarchy.org. (for Chronology of Bishops) ^{[self-published]}
- Chow, Gabriel. "Diocese of Nocera Inferiore-Sarno (Italy)". GCatholic.org. (for Chronology of Bishops) ^{[self-published]}

Catholic Church titles
Preceded by Domenico Giacobazzi	Bishop of Nocera de' Pagani; 1517–1524	Succeeded by Domenico Giacobazzi
