= Pietro Strambone =

Italian Roman Catholic prelate

Most Reverend Pietro Strambone
- Bishop of Nocera de' Pagani
- Church: Catholic Church
- Diocese: Diocese of Nocera de' Pagani
- In office: 1479–1503
- Predecessor: Giovanni Marcolini
- Successor: Bernardino Orsini

Personal details
- Died: 1503

Pietro Strambone, O.P. (died 1503) was a Roman Catholic prelate who served as Bishop of Nocera de' Pagani (1479–1503).

He was appointed a priest in the Order of Preachers. On 16 June 1479, he was appointed during the papacy of Pope Paul II as Bishop of Nocera de' Pagani. He served as Bishop of Nocera de' Pagani until his death in 1503.

== External links and additional sources ==
- Cheney, David M. "Diocese of Nocera Inferiore-Sarno". Catholic-Hierarchy.org. (for Chronology of Bishops) ^{[self-published]}
- Chow, Gabriel. "Diocese of Nocera Inferiore-Sarno (Italy)". GCatholic.org. (for Chronology of Bishops) ^{[self-published]}

Catholic Church titles
Preceded by Giovanni Marcolini	Bishop of Nocera de' Pagani; 1479–1503	Succeeded by Bernardino Orsini
