= Sulpizio Costantino =

Italian Roman Catholic prelate

Most Reverend Sulpizio Costantino
- Bishop of Nocera de' Pagani
- Church: Catholic Church
- Diocese: Diocese of Nocera de' Pagani
- In office: 1585–1602
- Predecessor: Paolo Giovio (il Giovane)
- Successor: Simone Lunadori

Personal details
- Died: 1602

Sulpizio Costantino (died 1602) was a Roman Catholic prelate who served as Bishop of Nocera de' Pagani (1585–1602).

== Biography ==
On 21 October 1585, Sulpizio Costantino was appointed during the papacy of Pope Sixtus V as Bishop of Nocera de' Pagani. He served as Bishop of Nocera de' Pagani until his death in 1602.

== External links and additional sources ==
- Cheney, David M. "Diocese of Nocera Inferiore-Sarno". Catholic-Hierarchy.org. (for Chronology of Bishops) ^{[self-published]}
- Chow, Gabriel. "Diocese of Nocera Inferiore-Sarno (Italy)". GCatholic.org. (for Chronology of Bishops) ^{[self-published]}

Catholic Church titles
Preceded by Paolo Giovio (il Giovane)	Bishop of Nocera de' Pagani; 1585–1602	Succeeded by Simone Lunadori
