= Agnone =

- Comune
- Città di Agnone
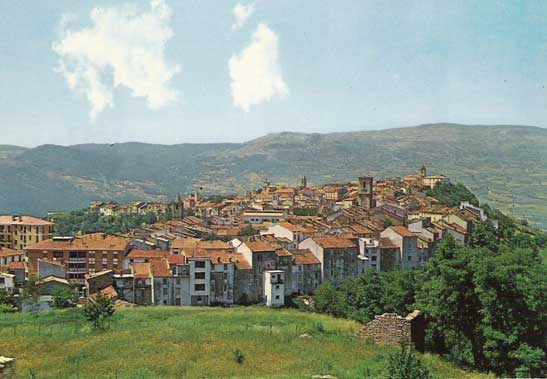
- View of Agnone

- Coat of arms

- Location of Agnone in Italy Agnone (Molise)
- Coordinates: 41°48′36″N 14°22′44″E
- Country: Italy
- Region: Molise
- Province: Isernia (IS)

Government
  - Mayor: Daniele Saia

Area
  - Total: 96.85 km^{2} (37.39 sq mi)
- Elevation: 830 m (2,720 ft)

Population (31 May 2022)
  - Total: 4,629
  - Density: 47.80/km^{2} (123.8/sq mi)
- Demonym: Agnonesi
- Time zone: UTC+1 (CET)
  - Summer (DST): UTC+2 (CEST)
- Postal code: 86081
- Dialing code: 0865
- Patron saint: San Cristanziano
- Website: Official website

Agnone (Neapolitan: Agnèune) is a comune in the province of Isernia, in the Molise region of southern Italy, about 53 km (33 mi) northwest of Campobasso. Agnone is known for the manufacture of bells by the Marinelli Bell Foundry. The town of Agnone proper is complemented by other populated centres like Fontesambuco, Villa Canale and Rigaini.

== History ==
=== Samnites ===
The Samnites comprised several distinct tribes in Samnium, a wholly inland district of south-central Italy named after them. The Pentri tribe of the Samnites was the most powerful and based in Bovianium, which was a city some 10 km (6 mi) south of present Agnone. Agnone is in the centre of important archaeological vestiges of the old Oscan-Samnite civilization and has been called "the Athens of the Sannio" due to the large number of ancient ruins of the Samnite culture. According to tradition, the name of Agnone derives from the old city of Aquilonia that was destroyed by the Romans. The Samnites were soundly defeated by the consuls Carvilius and Lucius Papirius Cursor in 293 B.C. Papirius, after making himself master of Aquilonia, which he burnt to the ground, proceeded to besiege Saepinum, on his way to Bovianum.

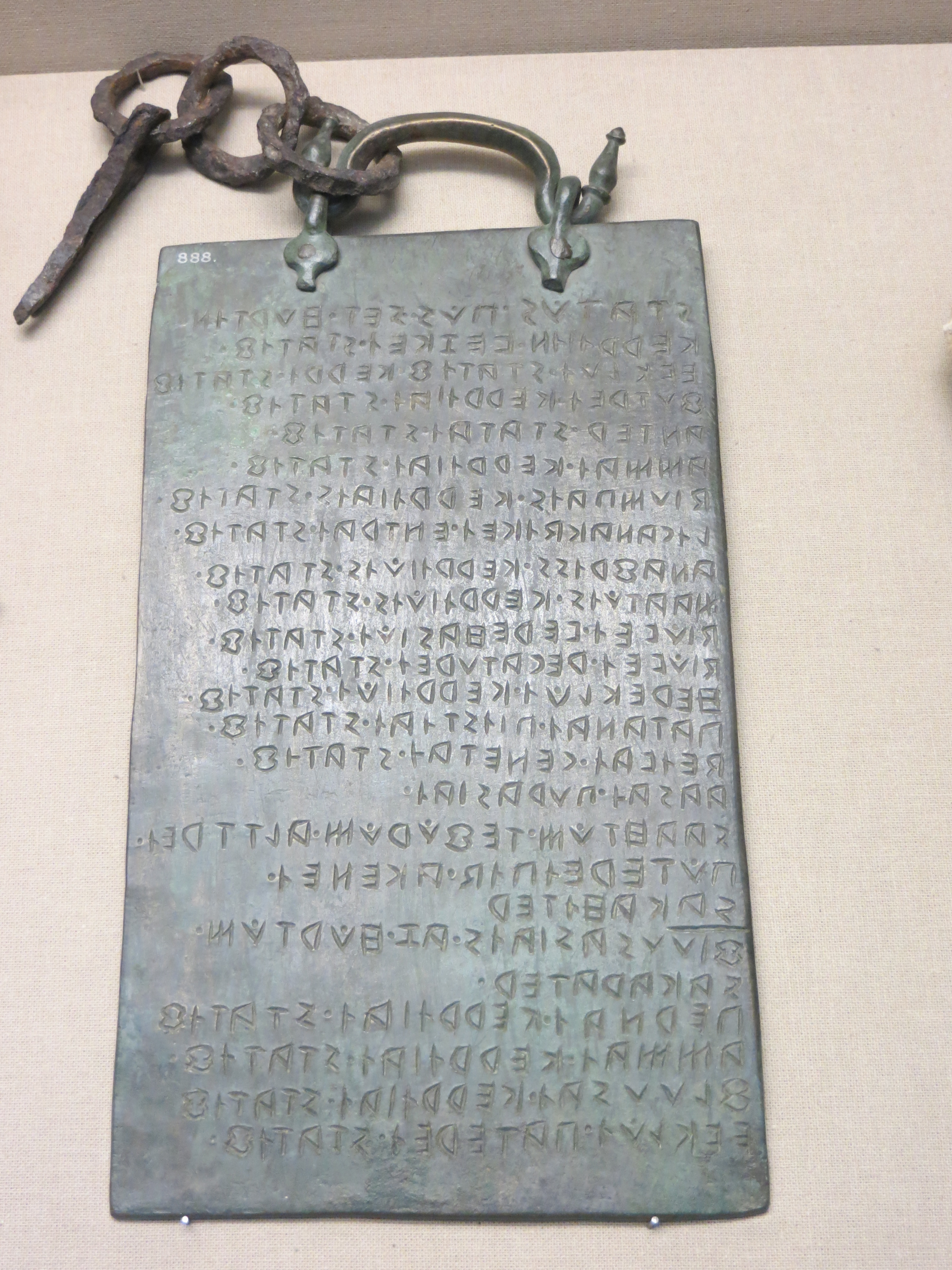
The Oscan Tablet in the British Museum

Agnone also lays claim to the most important ancient document found in Molise, the so-called "Oscan Tablet" ("Tabula Osca"), an inscription written in Oscan on a bronze tablet and dated to the 3rd century BC, now in the British Museum. The small bronze tablet was discovered in 1848 at Fonte di Romito, between Capracotta and Agnone, near the river Sangro. It provides an example of the most southerly dialect of the Samnite language. The tablet speaks of a series of dedications to different deities or holy beings

=== Romans ===
During the Roman Period, Christianity was spread to Molise. Agnone appears on Roman maps under different regions at various times as Aprutium, Picenum, Sabina et Samnium, Flaminia et Picenum and/or Campania et Samnium. The Roman penchant for building seems to have passed Agnone over as Samnitic architecture still prevailed.

=== Medieval ===
Agnone was an important centre during the rule of the Lombards, but was then left decaying in the centuries immediately preceding 1000, while the Verrino Valley and surrounding hills became a place of hermitages, monasteries, and small agricultural colonies. In 1139, the powerful Borrello family, supported by soldiers of fortune from Venice, probably originating from the Dalmatian colonies of the "Serenissima" took control of Agnone. The importance of Agnone grew during the Angevin and also in the Aragonese reigns to the point that during the reign of the Bourbons of the Two Sicilies, the city was among the 56 royal towns that reported directly to the King, and was free from any other type of feudal subjection. Joseph Bonaparte decided to create the region Molise, which was to exclude Agnone, but during the reign of Joachim Murat, the elders of Agnone asked and obtained the transition to Molise, basing the request on the geographical difficulties of the links to Abruzzo, and hoping to rise to a new role for the small region. During this period, the natural resources surrounding Agnone impacted its economy where skilled craftsmen produced gold jewellery, copperware, watches, and bells.

=== Post-Unification ===
Agnone suffered a significant decline in the years following the Unification of Italy in the 1860s. In 1884, the local newspaper L'Aquilonia reviewed the causes of emigration of peasants from Agnone and concluded that the two main factors were excessive taxes on consumers' goods and usurious interest rates that at times surpassed 20 percent in the town. The peasants were arrested for stealing the crops of the galantuomini ("gallant men" or ruling class), and a particularly frequent crime was the illegal cutting of timber on the town commons. In 1863, for example, the authorities actually prosecuted 624 cases of illegal felling of trees.

Consequently, when by the 1870s, owing to improvements in sea travel, a lowering of fares, and the expansive nature of the economies of both the United States and the Rio de la Plata region of southern South America, transatlantic emigration became a viable alternative, the lower classes of Agnone were, out of a sense of desperation, prime candidates. Politically alienated by decades of unfulfilled promises of land reform, mired in endemic poverty, dependent on a rapacious class of galantuomini for what was, by any yardstick, a meagre existence, the peasantry was further squeezed by relentless population increase throughout the first seven decades of the 19th century.

=== World War II to present ===
When Benito Mussolini's fascist regime came to power, they effectively put a stop to Italy's out-migration. During the Fascist era, Agnone was the site of a fascist internment camp administered and operated by the province of Campobasso. It first held only male "enemy subjects", which included British, Czech, and Slovakian nationals, as well as German and Austrian Jews. It was later changed to a camp for men and women Romani people from Yugoslavia. Many opponents of the fascists were sent here, including Don Raimondo Viale, the protagonist of "The Just Priest" by Nuto Revelli. The Germans sat up a concentration camp in Molise for gypsies where Father Viale tried to help them. The War would finally reach Agnone in December 1943, as the Allied Forces would land on Italy's Adriatic coast and make their way northward and westward to Rome. The 1st Canadian Infantry Division would drive the Germans and Fascists out of Molise, and on 2 and 3 December, the West Nova Scotia Regiment would billet in Agnone during the Ortona offensive.

After the war, Agnone's out-migration issues continued, although more for reasons of economic availability. As international emigration declined, southern Italians migrated to industrial northern Italy for more promising economic prospects. Presently, Agnone's population is still declining. As Molise is starting to find recognition as a tourist destination, Agnone is marketing itself on the agritourism market and for its unique Pre-Roman and Medieval architecture.

== Main sights ==
=== Medieval sights ===
The town's medieval-style architecture is reflected in its nineteen churches, including the Church of San Marco, with a large Renaissance portal embellished by a copper lion. In the 11th century, Odorisio and Gualtiero Borrello introduced the cult of Saint Mark and brought artists from Venice to decorate their homes with Saint Mark's lion. This church is adorned with great artwork including: rich altars, a painting of a Holy Family and Saints by Luca Giordano; an ostensory in gilded copper and enamel, by Giovanni da Agnone, a disciple of Nicola da Guardiagrele. The church of Sant'Antonio Abate has a Romanesque portal and a 17th-century bell tower, and on the vault inside a giant fresco by Francesco Palumbo. Sant'Emidio has a 12th-century portal and rich works of art including wooden painted statues that are taken out on Good Thursday and Friday for a re-enactment of the Last Supper. The church of Corso Garibaldi is sided by ancient houses with stone lions near the doors (the lion is on Agnone coat of arms), ancient artisans' workshops, Apollonio house and the Nuonno house. Church of San Francesco displays a giant round window over the portal, dated 1330. Inside, the Final Judgment on the vault is painted by Gambora.

The Church of San Nicola has a peculiar bell tower coated with yellow and green ceramic tiles. It is due to Agnone's craftsmen and medieval architecture that the town adopted the nickname Città d'Arte (City of Art) which the town uses on a promotional basis.

=== Pontificia Fonderia Marinelli ===
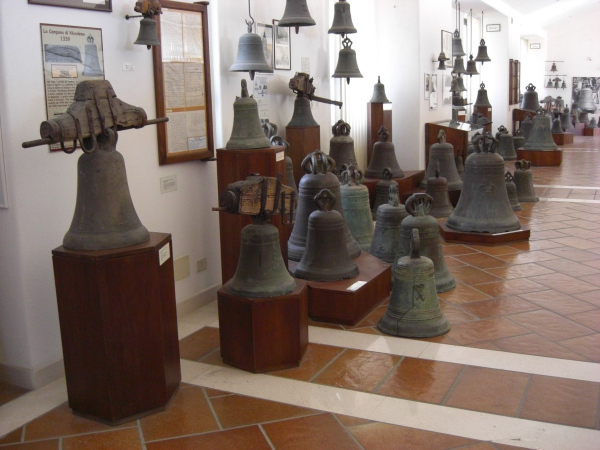
The Marinelli Bell Museum.

The Pontificia Fonderia Marinelli (the Marinelli Pontifical Foundry) is an ancient factory of bells which has been operating in Agnone for nearly a millennium. It ranks as one of the oldest companies in the world, where the Marinelli family has run the foundry for the last 1000 years.

This factory has a museum, where bells of almost a thousand years of antiquity to more recent others are displayed. It is also possible to observe the artisan process of the manufacturing of bells. The factory was visited by the Pope John Paul II in 1995 as many of the foundry's bells can be found at the Vatican.

== Geography ==
Agnone lies on a rocky spear in the mountainous regions of Molise (Alto Molise). Farms and country houses surround the city at elevations varying from 370 m (1,210 ft) above sea level of the Verrino River bed to 1,386 m (4,547 ft) at Monte Castelbarone. The Sangro River also passes by Agnone.

Its geographic position has been described as "the natural capital of the Alto Molise". Its territorial extension covers 9,630 hectares (23,800 acres) made up of forests, pastures and agriculture land.

From a geomorphological point of view, the area is affected by several landslides. For example, in January 2003, a huge landslide occurred in the municipality of Agnone causing important damage to infrastructures.

== Culture ==
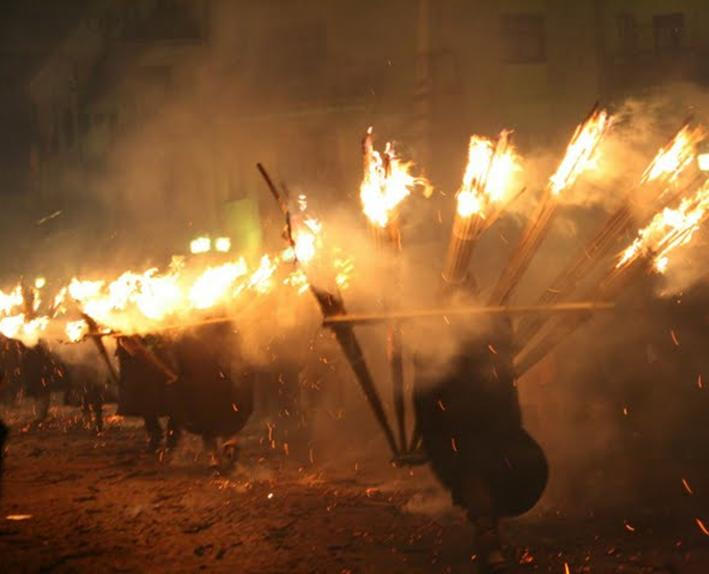
The 'Ndocciata torchlight parade

On Christmas Eve Agnone holds the "Carnevale Agnonese", including the Ndocciata, which is a huge torchlight parade of thousands of handmade, wooden torches made into nine different quarters ("borgate"), accompanied by the sound of bagpipes, to the Piazza Plebiscito where a brotherhood bonfire is lit.

The Fiera delle Arti e Mestieri Antichi (Arts and Antique Crafts Fair) is held from 17 to 19 August where a large area of the old town home to artisans, display their works. Artisan crafts at the fair generally include goldsmiths, tinkers, tanners, wrought-iron, lace and embroidery.

== Notable people ==
- Saint Francis Caracciolo: Confessor, co-founder of the Congregation of the Minor Clerks Regular, born Abruzzo, Italy, 1563; died Agnone, Italy, 1608. He went to Naples in 1585 to study theology, and was ordained in 1587. He collaborated with John Augustine Adorno in drawing up rules for the Congregation, which was approved by Pope Sixtus V, in 1588. Chosen general at Naples, in 1593, he established houses in Rome, Madrid, Valladolid, and Alcala. Relics at Naples and San Lorenzo in Lucina, Rome. Canonized, 1807. Feast, Roman Calendar, 4 June.
- Ippolito Franconi (1593–1653) was a Roman Catholic prelate who served as Bishop of Nocera de' Pagani (1632–1653).
