= Emiddio Lenti =

Italian Roman Catholic prelate

Most Reverend Emiddio Lenti
- Bishop of Nocera de' Pagani
- Church: Catholic Church
- Diocese: Diocese of Nocera de' Pagani
- In office: 1685–1691
- Predecessor: Felice Gabrielli
- Successor: Sebastiano Perissi

Orders
- Ordination: 23 December 1651
- Consecration: 23 April 1685 by Alessandro Crescenzi (cardinal)

Personal details
- Born: 2 December 1628 Ascoli Satriano, Italy
- Died: 10 January 1691 (age 62) Nocera de' Pagani, Italy

Emiddio Lenti (2 December 1628 – 10 January 1691) was a Roman Catholic prelate who served as Bishop of Nocera de' Pagani (1685–1691).

== Biography ==
Emiddio Lenti was born in Ascoli Satriano, Italy on 2 December 1628 and ordained a priest on 23 December 1651. On 9 April 1685, he was appointed during the papacy of Pope Innocent XI as Bishop of Nocera de' Pagani. On 23 April 1685, he was consecrated bishop by Alessandro Crescenzi (cardinal), Cardinal-Priest of Santa Prisca, with Diego Petra, Archbishop of Sorrento, and Pier Antonio Capobianco, Bishop Emeritus of Lacedonia, serving as co-consecrators. He served as Bishop of Nocera de' Pagani until his death on 10 January 1691.

== See also ==
- Catholic Church in Italy

== External links and additional sources ==
- Cheney, David M. "Diocese of Nocera Inferiore-Sarno". Catholic-Hierarchy.org. (for Chronology of Bishops) ^{[self-published]}
- Chow, Gabriel. "Diocese of Nocera Inferiore-Sarno (Italy)". GCatholic.org. (for Chronology of Bishops) ^{[self-published]}

Catholic Church titles
Preceded by Felice Gabrielli	Bishop of Nocera de' Pagani; 1685–1691	Succeeded by Sebastiano Perissi
