= Stefano de Vicari =

Italian Roman Catholic prelate

Most Reverend Stefano de Vicari
- Bishop of Nocera de' Pagani
- Church: Catholic Church
- Diocese: Diocese of Nocera de' Pagani
- In office: 1610–1620
- Predecessor: Simone Lunadori
- Successor: Francesco Trivulzio

Orders
- Consecration: 27 December 1610 by Girolamo Bernerio

Personal details
- Died: 1620 Nocera de' Pagani, Italy

Stefano de Vicari, O.P. (died 1620) was a Roman Catholic prelate who served as Bishop of Nocera de' Pagani (1610–1620).

== Biography ==
Stefano de Vicari was ordained a priest in the Order of Preachers. On 4 November 1610, he was appointed during the papacy of Pope Paul V as Bishop of Nocera de' Pagani. On 27 December 1610, he was consecrated bishop by Girolamo Bernerio, Cardinal-Bishop of Porto e Santa Rufina, with Vincenzo Bonincontro, Bishop of Agrigento, and Giovanni Canauli, Bishop of Fossombrone, serving as co-consecrators. He served as Bishop of Nocera de' Pagani until his death in 1620.

== External links and additional sources ==
- Cheney, David M. "Diocese of Nocera Inferiore-Sarno". Catholic-Hierarchy.org. (for Chronology of Bishops) ^{[self-published]}
- Chow, Gabriel. "Diocese of Nocera Inferiore-Sarno (Italy)". GCatholic.org. (for Chronology of Bishops) ^{[self-published]}

Catholic Church titles
Preceded by Simone Lunadori	Bishop of Nocera de' Pagani; 1610–1620	Succeeded by Francesco Trivulzio
