= Pontificia Fonderia Marinelli =

Italian bell foundry

Coordinates: 41°48′34″N 14°22′34″E

Marinelli Pontifical Foundry

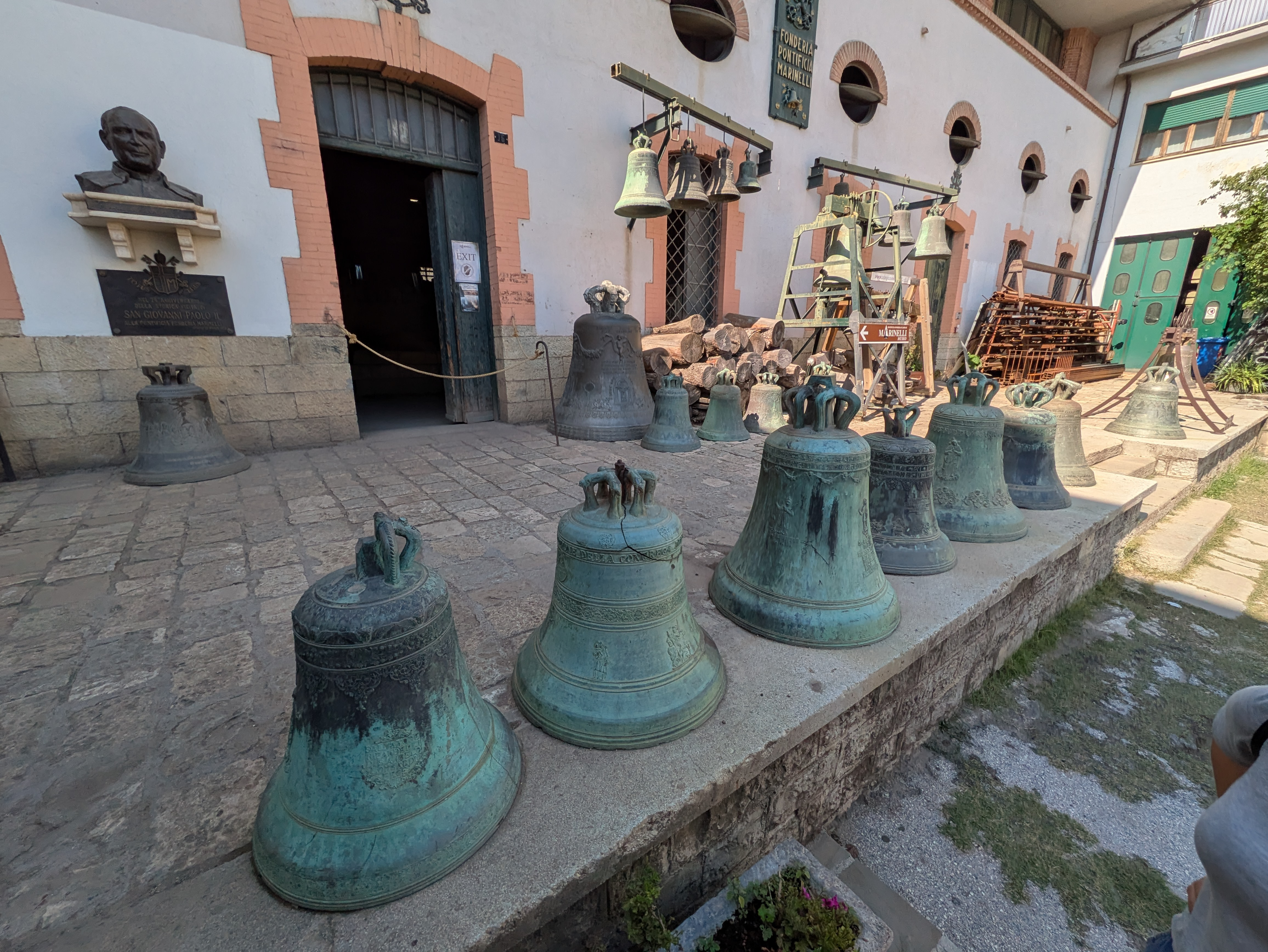
- Native name: Pontificia Fonderia Marinelli
- Industry: Industrial
- Founded: c. 1040
- Headquarters: Via Felice D'Onofrio 14 - 86081, Agnone, Molise, Italy
- Key people: Pasquale Marinelli, Ettore Marinelli
- Products: Bells, other bronze products
- Services: Bell manufacturing and restoration
- Number of employees: 12
- Website: http://campanemarinelli.com/

Marinelli Bells – Pontifical Bell Foundry (Italian: Campane Marinelli – Pontificia Fonderia di Campane) is a bell foundry in Agnone, Italy. Allegedly founded in 1040, with the oldest record from 1339, the foundry is one of the oldest family businesses in Italy. In addition to bells, it produces bronze portals, bas-reliefs, and various church artifacts, as well as restoring worn or damaged bells.

== Marinelli family ==
The Marinelli family first started the bell foundry nearly 1,000 years ago in the Apennine hills of Italy, in the Kingdom of Naples. The village of Agnone, a small Italian town of 5,200 inhabitants in the province of Isernia in Molise, is where the foundry is now located. The foundry "has a tradition of foundries that dates back 10 centuries." In 1924, the foundry was awarded "the title of pontifical foundry" by the Vatican. The Roman Catholic Church now accounts for 90 per cent of all orders placed for the company. The company is co-owned and operated by brothers Armando and Pasquale Marinelli. The foundry typically produces up to 50 bells a year and currently employs around 12 people.

== Notable bells ==
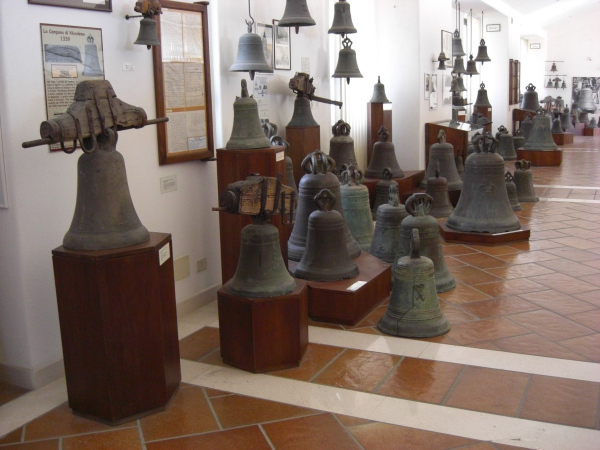
The Marinelli Bell Foundry museum

The foundry produced the latest bell to be hung within the bell tower of the Leaning Tower of Pisa. The bell is a 600-kilogram (1,300 lb) replica of the 17th-century bell damaged in 1944 during the bombings in Italy during World War II. The newest addition started service on Easter 2004, replacing the missing bell for the first time in 60 years.

In 1923, the foundry made a set of bells for the Mariano Sanctuary in Pompeii. The bell of Monte Cassino was cast for the church of San Benedetto in 1950, which was destroyed during the Battle of Monte Cassino. In 1961, the foundry cast a special bell to commemorate the "100th anniversary of Italy's founding as a united country." In 1992, one of their bells commemorated the 500th anniversary of Christopher Columbus's discovery of the Americas. Pope John Paul II was presented the official Jubilee Bell in 2000, which is hung in St. Peter's Square. The bells of Pontificia Fonderia Marinelli can also be found in New York City (United Nations Building), Rome (United Nations FAO), Beijing, Jerusalem, South America, and South Korea.

== Craftsmanship ==
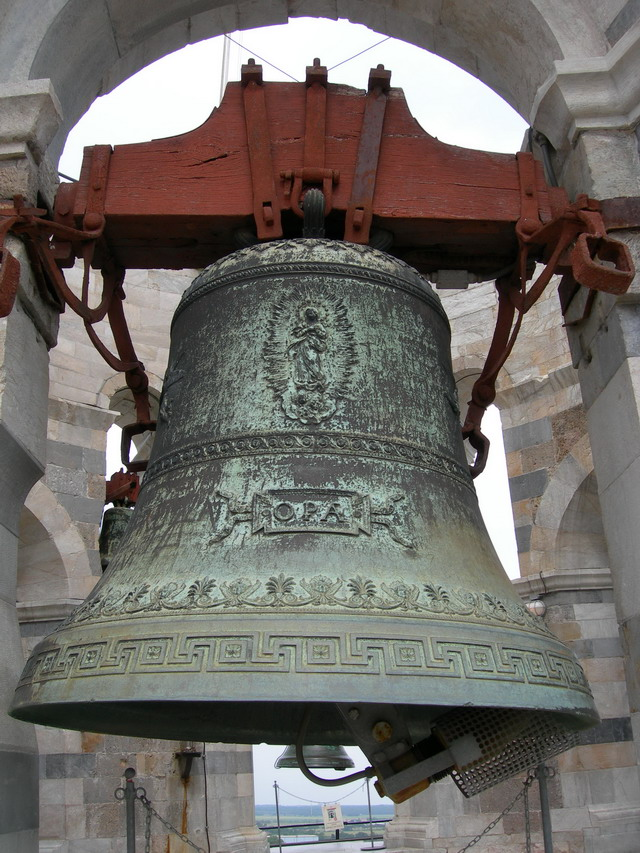
Marinelli's Leaning Tower of Pisa bell

The firm's managers still apply the same lost wax casting technique that the firm's founders used nearly a thousand years ago. The artisans use wax to transfer the bell's designs onto a brick "core" slathered with clay, slightly smaller than the bell to be cast. Another layer of clay is applied to form a "false bell". After this hardens, the wax inside is melted, leaving the imprint of the design on the inside of the false bell. Molten bronze, at a temperature of around 1,200 °C (2,190 °F), is poured into the space to form the bell.

== See also ==
- List of oldest companies

== Sources ==
- Marinelli, Gioconda (1980). Arte e Fuoco: Campane di Agnone (in Italian). Enne. ISBN 8872130859. OCLC 638268870.
