= Francesco Trivulzio =

Italian Roman Catholic prelate

Most Reverend Francesco Trivulzio
- Bishop of Nocera de' Pagani
- Church: Catholic Church
- Diocese: Diocese of Nocera de' Pagani
- In office: 1621–1631
- Predecessor: Stefano de Vicari
- Successor: Ippolito Franconi

Orders
- Consecration: April 1621 by Giovanni Garzia Mellini

Personal details
- Died: 22 August 1631 Nocera de' Pagani, Italy

Francesco Trivulzio (died 1631) was a Roman Catholic prelate who served as Bishop of Nocera de' Pagani (1621–1631).

== Biography ==
Francesco Trivulzio was born ordained a priest in 1605. On 29 March 1621, he was appointed during the papacy of Pope Paul V as Bishop of Nocera de' Pagani. In April 1621, he was consecrated bishop by Giovanni Garzia Mellini, Cardinal-Priest of Santi Quattro Coronati. He served as Bishop of Nocera de' Pagani until his death on 22 August 1631.

== External links and additional sources ==
- Cheney, David M. "Diocese of Nocera Inferiore-Sarno". Catholic-Hierarchy.org. (for Chronology of Bishops) ^{[self-published]}
- Chow, Gabriel. "Diocese of Nocera Inferiore-Sarno (Italy)". GCatholic.org. (for Chronology of Bishops) ^{[self-published]}

Catholic Church titles
Preceded by Stefano de Vicari	Bishop of Nocera de' Pagani; 1621–1631	Succeeded by Ippolito Franconi
