= Simone Lunadoro =

Italian Roman Catholic prelate

Most Reverend Simone Lunadoro
- Bishop of Nocera de' Pagani
- Church: Catholic Church
- Diocese: Diocese of Nocera de' Pagani
- In office: 1602–1610
- Predecessor: Sulpizio Costantino
- Successor: Stefano de Vicari

Orders
- Consecration: 11 August 1602 by Camillo Borghese

Personal details
- Died: 1610 Nocera de' Pagani, Italy

Simone Lunadoro or Lunadori (died 1610) was a Roman Catholic prelate who served as Bishop of Nocera de' Pagani (1602–1610).

== Biography ==
On 17 June 1602, Simone Lunadoro was appointed during the papacy of Pope Clement VIII as Bishop of Nocera de' Pagani. On 11 August 1602, he was consecrated bishop by Camillo Borghese, Cardinal-Priest of San Crisogono, with Guglielmo Bastoni, Bishop of Pavia, and Valeriano Muti, Bishop of Bitetto, serving as co-consecrators. He served as Bishop of Nocera de' Pagani until his death in 1610.

While bishop, he was the principal co-consecrator of Louis de Salignac de La Mothe-Fénelon, Bishop of Sarlat (1603).

== External links and additional sources ==
- Cheney, David M. "Diocese of Nocera Inferiore-Sarno". Catholic-Hierarchy.org. (for Chronology of Bishops) ^{[self-published]}
- Chow, Gabriel. "Diocese of Nocera Inferiore-Sarno (Italy)". GCatholic.org. (for Chronology of Bishops) ^{[self-published]}

Catholic Church titles
Preceded by Sulpizio Costantino	Bishop of Nocera de' Pagani; 1602–1610	Succeeded by Stefano de Vicari
