= Felice Gabrielli =

Italian Roman Catholic prelate

Most Reverend Felice Gabrielli
- Bishop of Nocera de' Pagani
- Church: Catholic Church
- In office: 1603–1684
- Predecessor: Bonaventura D'Avalos
- Successor: Emiddio Lenti

Orders
- Consecration: 28 September 1659 by Giovanni Battista Maria Pallotta

Personal details
- Born: 1603 Capradosso, Italy
- Died: 1 September 1684 (age 81)

Felice Gabrielli, O.F.M. Conv. (died 1684) was a Roman Catholic prelate who served as Bishop of Nocera de' Pagani (1659–1684).

== Biography ==
Felice Gabrielli was born in Capradosso, Italy in 1603 and ordained a priest in the Order of Friars Minor Conventual. On 22 September 1659, he was appointed during the papacy of Pope Alexander VII as Bishop of Nocera de' Pagani. On 28 September 1659, he was consecrated bishop by Giovanni Battista Maria Pallotta, Cardinal-Priest of Santa Maria in Trastevere. He served as Bishop of Nocera de' Pagani until his death on 1 September 1684.

== External links and additional sources ==
- Cheney, David M. "Diocese of Nocera Inferiore-Sarno". Catholic-Hierarchy.org. (for Chronology of Bishops) ^{[self-published]}
- Chow, Gabriel. "Diocese of Nocera Inferiore-Sarno (Italy)". GCatholic.org. (for Chronology of Bishops) ^{[self-published]}

Catholic Church titles
Preceded by Bonaventura D'Avalos	Bishop of Nocera de' Pagani; 1603–1684	Succeeded by Emiddio Lenti
