= Paolo Giovio (il Giovane) =

Italian Roman Catholic prelate

Most Reverend Paolo Giovio
- Bishop of Nocera de' Pagani
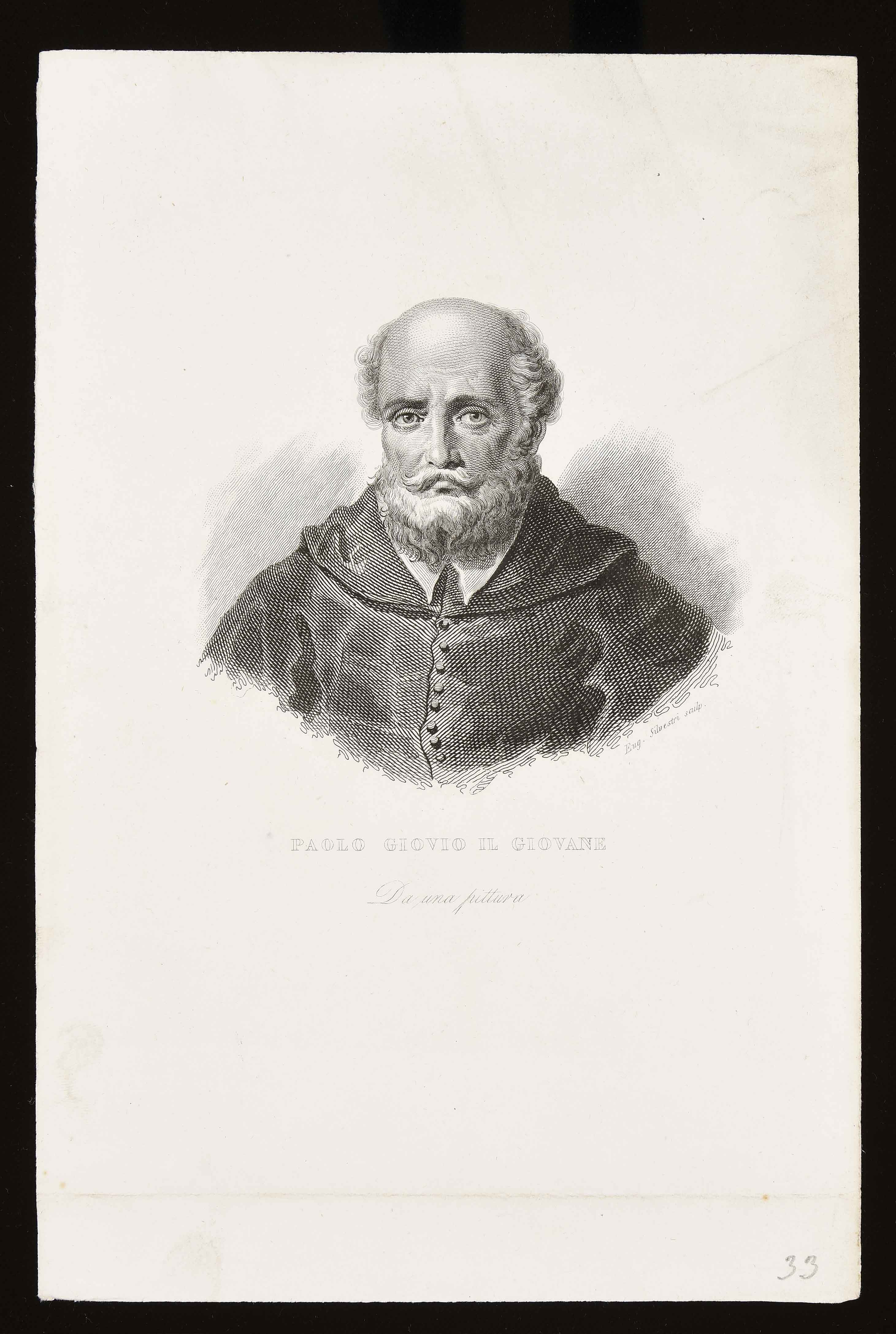
- Paolo Giovio de Iconografia italiana v.4
- Church: Catholic Church
- Diocese: Diocese of Nocera de' Pagani
- In office: 1560–1585
- Predecessor: Domenico Giacobazzi
- Successor: Sulpizio Costantino

Personal details
- Born: 1530
- Died: 1585 (aged 54–55)

Paolo Giovio il Giovane or Paolo Giovio the Younger (died 1585) was a Roman Catholic prelate who served as Bishop of Nocera de' Pagani (1560–1585).

== Biography ==
On 29 Nov 1560, Paolo Giovio was appointed during the papacy of Pope Pius IV as Coadjutor Bishop of Nocera de' Pagani. He succeeded to the bishopric in December 1560. He served as Bishop of Nocera de' Pagani until his death in 1585.

== External links and additional sources ==
- Cheney, David M. "Diocese of Nocera Inferiore-Sarno". Catholic-Hierarchy.org. (for Chronology of Bishops) ^{[self-published]}
- Chow, Gabriel. "Diocese of Nocera Inferiore-Sarno (Italy)". GCatholic.org. (for Chronology of Bishops) ^{[self-published]}

Catholic Church titles
| Preceded by Domenico Giacobazzi | Bishop of Nocera de' Pagani; 1585–1602 | Succeeded by Sulpizio Costantino |
