= Priscus of Nocera =

3rd-century bishop of Nocera in Italy

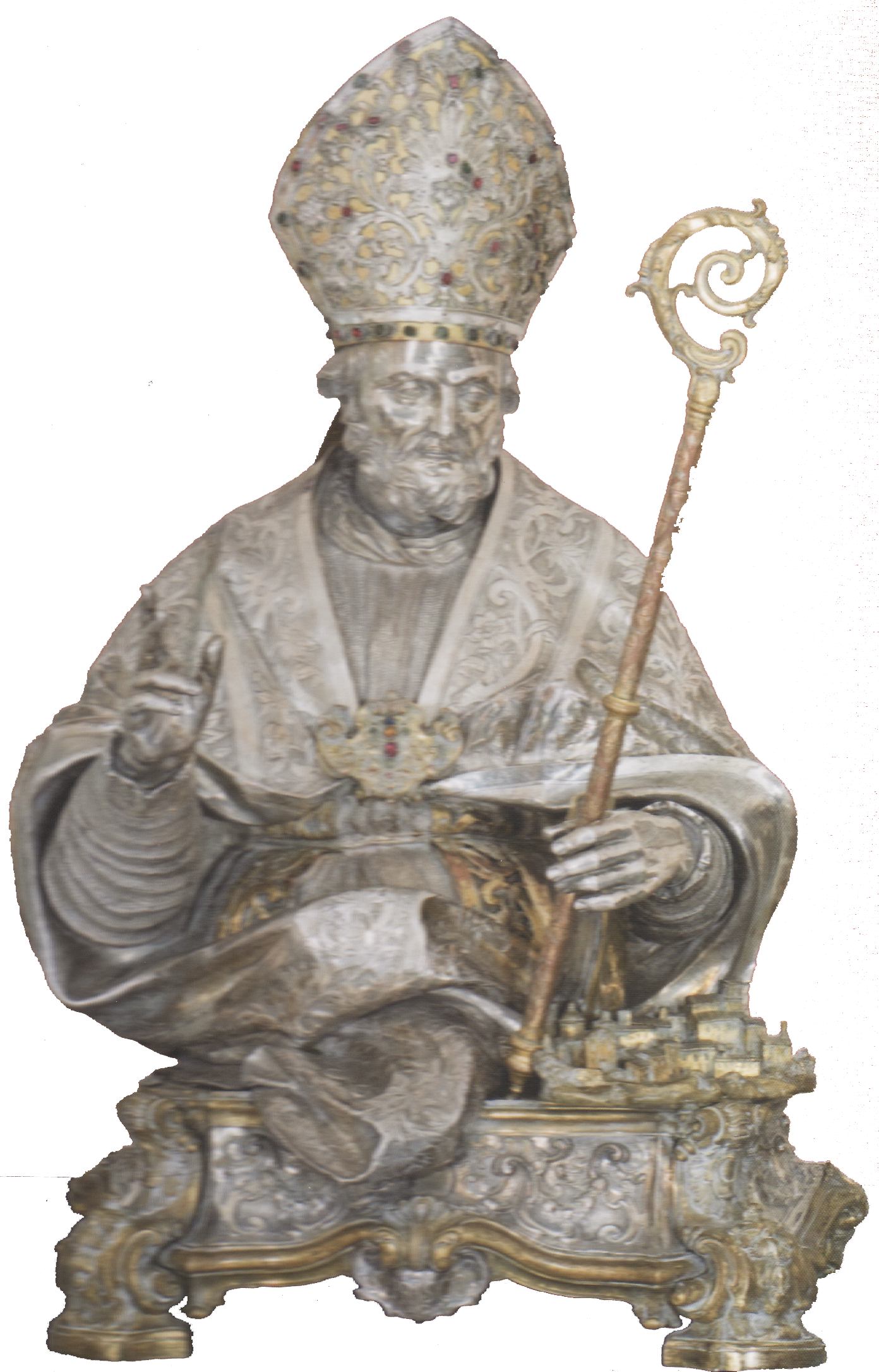
- Born: 3rd century
- Died: 3rd century
- Honored in: Catholic Church; Old Catholic Church
- Feast: 9 May
- Patronage: Nocera Inferiore; Diocese of Nocera Inferiore-Sarno

Priscus of Nocera (Nuceria Alfaterna, 3rd century – Nuceria Alfaterna, 3rd century) was the first bishop of Nocera, patron saint of the city of Nocera Inferiore and of the diocese of Nocera Inferiore-Sarno.

In the liturgical year its religious anniversary is 9 May, celebrated in Nocera Inferiore great celebrations, being his birthday a city holiday.

== References in literature ==
=== Christian literature ===
The first author to write about San Priscus was the Italian bishop Saint Pontius Anicius Meropius Paolinus. In his book Carme or Carmen, vol. XIX, he writes of the cult of San Priscus being practiced in 405 in Nola, as well as in Nuceria Alfaterna. The testimony of Saint Pontius can be considered a terminus ante quem (a Latin phrase meaning the limit before which — the latest possible date an event could have occurred) and helps to date the life of Priscus.

Ponzio Anicio Meropio Paolino, "Fonte sacrata dies illuxerat illa beati
natalem Prisci referens, quem te Nola celebrat
quamvis ille alia nucerinus Episcopus
Urbe sederit." [Carme XIX], Carme XIX (in Italian), vol. 515–518

Another author who mentioned the life of Saint Prisco was saint Adonis of Vienne in one of his volumes, called the Martyrology.

=== Other authors ===
Giovanni Antonio Remondini wrote a brief description of Bishop Priscus in one of his texts.

Giovanni Antonio Remondini (1751), "Della nolana Ecclesiastica storia" [Of the Nolan Ecclesiastical History], Splendea quel dì nella città di Nola
festivo a Prisco che pastor già resse
là dei pagani e picentin Nocera. (in Italian), vol. II, book III, Naples (Italy), p. 674

Finally we have a quote about San Prisco by the author Gennaro Orlando, in his book History of Nocera de' Pagani, where the figure of the holy bishop is also described.

=== Critical authors ===
Vincenzo D'Avino in his book the Ecclesiastic's Encyclopedia, volume 3, even if he cites two authors who speak of the exploits of San Priscus, the first Saint Pontius Anicius Meropius Paolinus and the second, more recent Ludovico Antonio Muratori famous presbyter, Italian historian, expressly states that there is no certain proof of his life.

=== Miracles ===
The Roman fountain, believed to be a gift from the pontiff to the bishop.

Popular tradition ascribes many miracles to the saint.

Accused of heresy for having celebrated mass at dawn in solitude, he was taken while still wearing cassocks and forced to go to Rome to clear his name in front of the Pope. Having nothing to offer as a gift to the pontiff, he convinced some geese to follow him to Lazio to make a gift to Peter's successor.

Angels appeared in front of the Pope who totally exonerated him. Impressed by this miracle, the pontiff gave Priscus a large marble fountain which the saint transported to Nocera with the sole aid of two vaccarelle (cows). Furthermore, to satisfy the needs of his thirsty companions, the saint made a doe appear out of nowhere who quenched their thirst with her own milk, heating them with burning embers that she had kept under her tunic.

Close to death, he decided to lie down in the same tomb that welcomed his sisters, asking their skeletons to move to make room for him, a wish which was granted.

Finally, the miracle of the separation of the split mountain, a pass (probably Roman work) located on the border between the municipalities of Nocera Inferiore and Castel San Giorgio, as reported in the first volume of the historical novel by Andrea Calenda di Tavani, entitled: Ramondello Orsino, storia napoletana del Trecento.

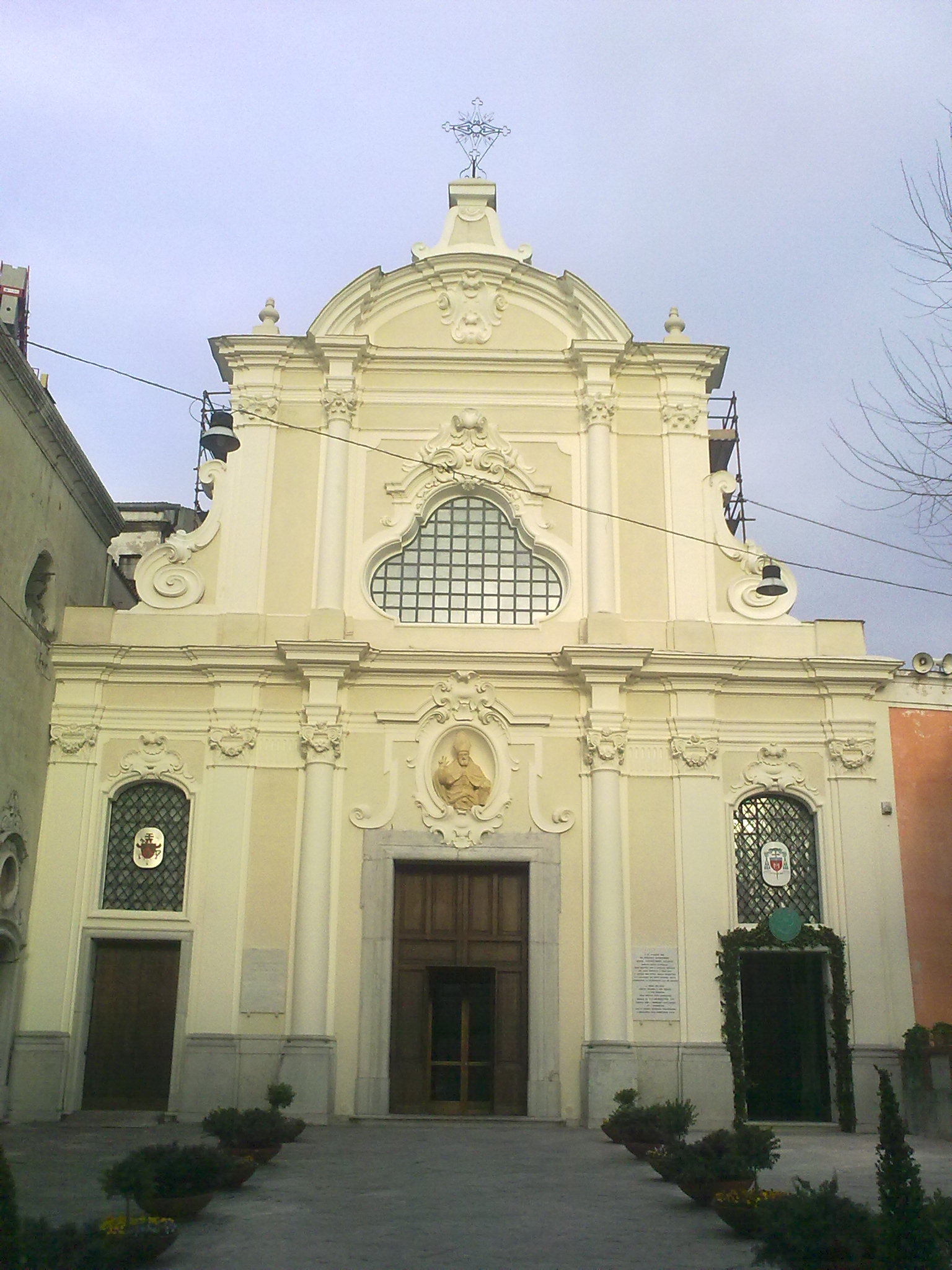
Facade of the Cathedral Basilica of San Prisco, Cathedral of Nocera Inferiore (SA).

=== Cult ===
He was initially buried in a tuff tomb in one of the necropolises of Nuceria Alfaterna; his body, the object of growing popular attention, which later became devotion, was moved just west of the ancient city, to an area that would take the name of vescovado, initially to a Benedictine abbey. With the restoration of the diocese in 1386 the abbey church was elevated to the rank of cathedral.

The archaeological research that has taken place inside the Cathedral of Nocera Inferiore has once again made entirely visible the place in which the saint's remains were buried together with those of his two sisters Marzia and Marina, also venerated as saints. The strigilated sarcophagus refers to examples from the 3rd-4th century. The osteological data are pertinent to an elderly and large man.

In addition to the diocese of Nocerina, the cult of San Prisco is also reserved for Sant'Agnello, a municipality on the Sorrento coast where in 1827 a church dedicated to Saints Prisco and Agnello of Naples was consecrated.

Some relics of the sisters of San Prisco are also preserved in a chapel in the crypt of the Salerno Cathedral. They were placed there in the Middle Ages by Bishop Alfano I.

The patronal feast is on 9 May.

==== Bubbetella ====
Bubbetella is a bean soup that is eaten during the celebration of the patron saint of Nocera Inferiore.

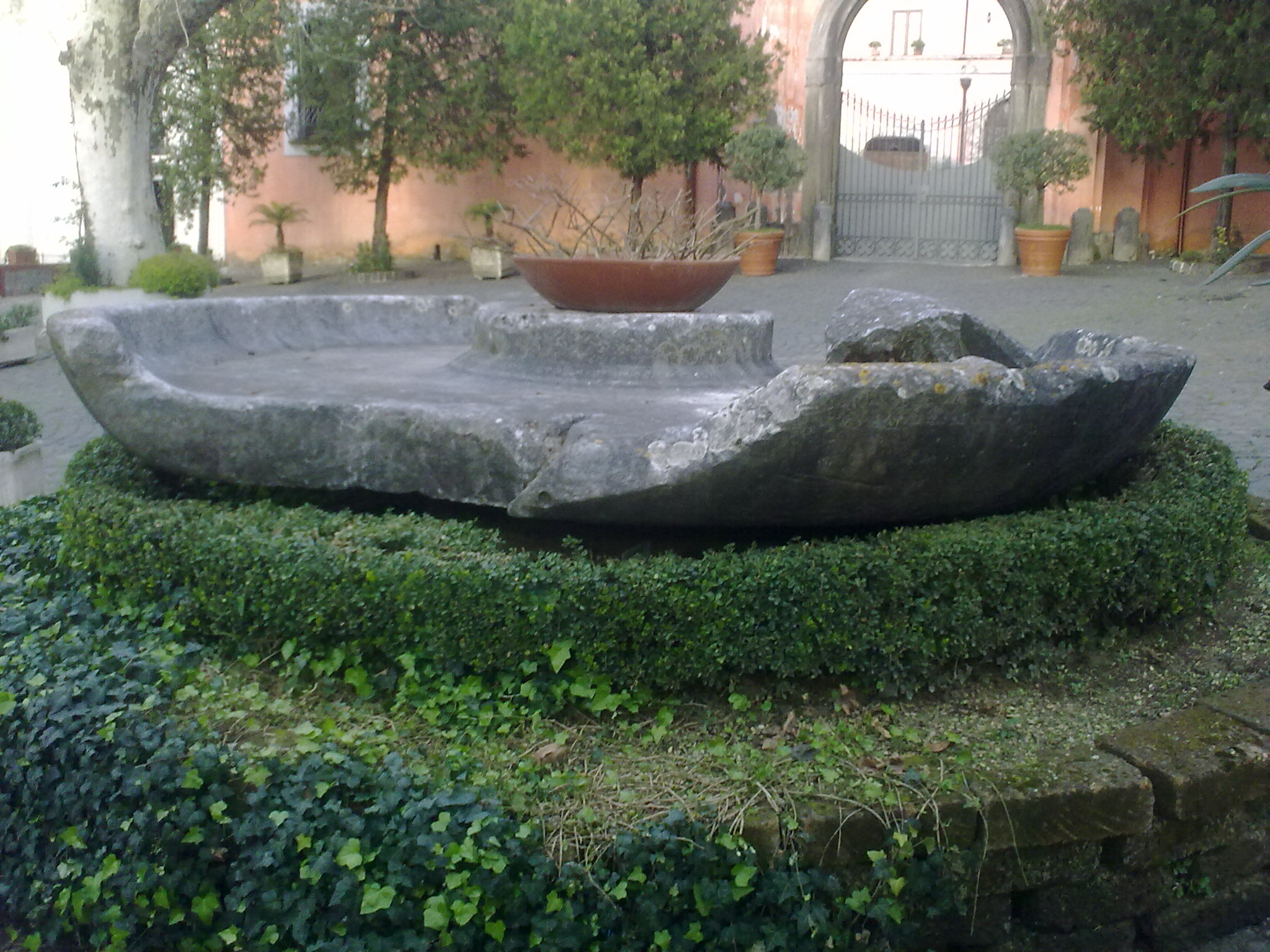
Roman marble basin or basin, believed to be a gift from the Pope to Bishop Priscus (1st century AD).

== Cathedral Basilica San Prisco ==
=== History of the religious complex ===
The Cathedral Basilica of San Prisco is a cathedral that stands in the current city of Nocera Inferiore, (formerly Nocera de' Pagani).

Before the construction of the cathedral, there was a church, where the faithful of Nocera gathered for functions. It was built following the disappearance of San Prisco, who died near the church of San Filippo alle Macerie (formerly located outside the city walls).

In the 12th century, the Benedictine monks had the modern monastery and the adjoining church dedicated to the saint built there.

The monastery was elevated to a cathedral by Pope Urban VI in 1385, so the entire religious complex was transformed into a bishopric.

At the end of May 2024, several million euros were obtained directly from the Italian Ministry of Culture for the adaptation of the entire religious complex, as the building needed major redevelopments after the 1980 Irpinia earthquake.

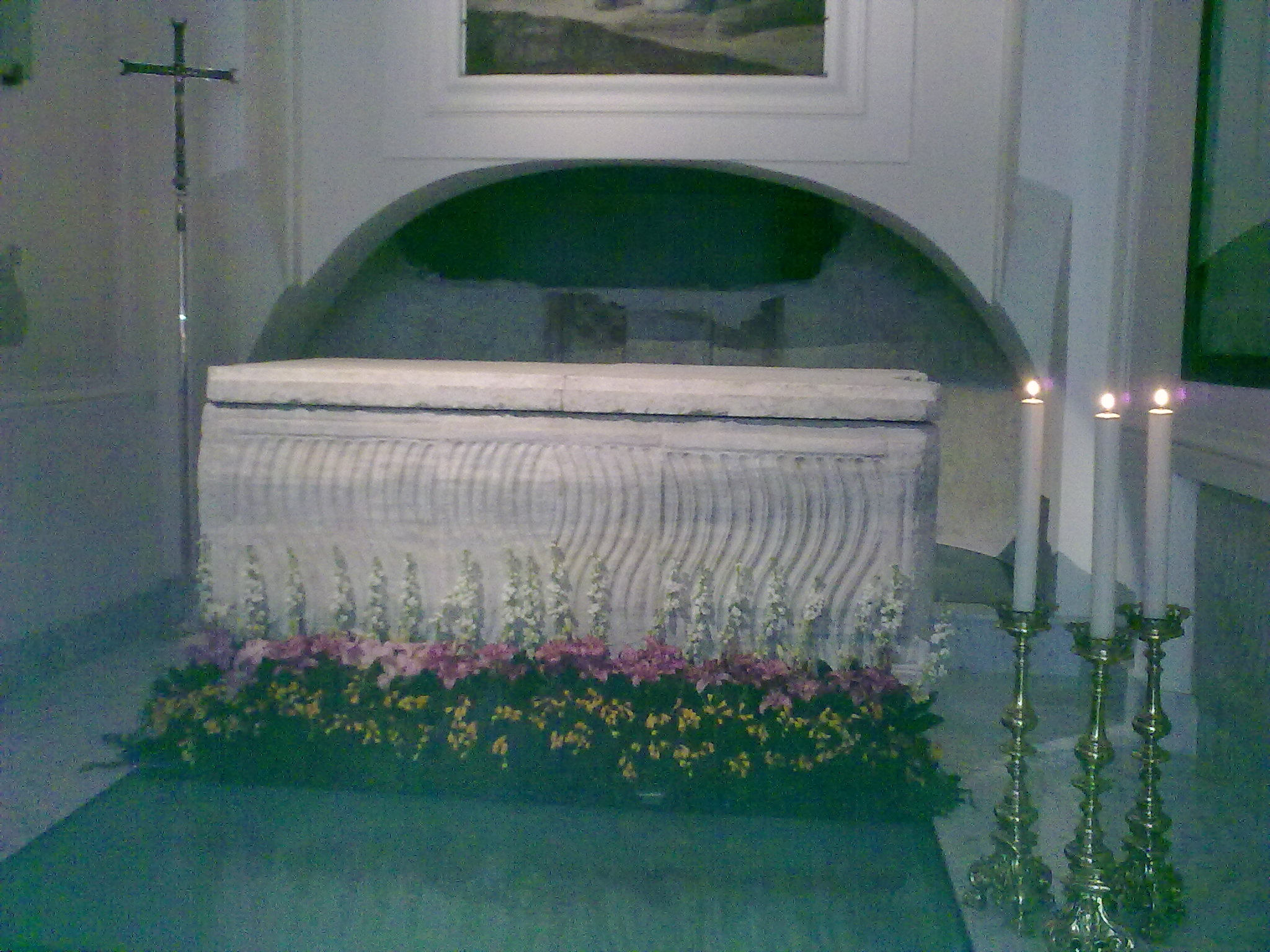
Strigilated sarcophagus of San Prisco (2nd- 3rd century AD).

=== Chapel dedicated to San Prisco ===
Inside the cathedral there is a chapel dedicated to the patron saint, furthermore there is a stone sarcophagus containing his remains.

=== Martyrium of San Prisco ===
The Martyrium of San Prisco was discovered in recent times, under the main apse of the cathedral. The Martyrium of Saint Priscus is in the shape of a semi-annular crypt.

== Museum of San Prisco in Nocera Inferiore ==
=== The opening of the diocesan museum dedicated to the saint ===
The diocesan museum dedicated to San Prisco di Nocera was opened on the initiative of the then bishop of Agro-Nocerino-Sarnese Gioacchino Illiano in 2008, to enhance and preserve the works of art of the area.

The museum is located in a wing of the Diocesan Seminary of Nocera, a structure that is part of the current offices of the Curia.

In the museum there are various finds from the countryside of valuable artistic and cultural value and also the famous silver bust, with gilded parts and containing precious stones of San Prisco, created around 1771 by the artist Savero Manzone at the behest of the then bishop of Nocera de' Pagani Benedetto dei Monti Sanfelice (in ancient times Nocera was a single municipality until the definitive division of the two cities occurred in 1851).

=== The restoration of the silver bust of San Prisco ===
After several months of restoration of three works: the bust of San Prisco, the canvas of the Coronation of Santa Rosa da Lima and the wooden statue of the Virgin of Sorrows, they return to the diocesan museum to be exhibited to the public again, during the evening of 13 September 2019, the restorations were presented at the museum during an evening event.

On 8 May 2021, a new miter for the silver statue of San Prisco was presented.

== Bibliography ==
=== Archival sources ===
- Biblioteca Nazionale di Roma [National Library of Rome] (in Italian). Rome (RM).
- Archivio diocesano di Nocera Inferiore [Diocesan archive of Nocera Inferiore] (in Italian). Nocera Inferiore (SA).
- Bishop Paolo Regio da Vico Equense; et al. (Giuseppe Cacchi) (1587). At Giuseppe Cacchi (ed.). Libro secondo delle vite de i santi. Descritte da monsig. Paolo Regio, vescouo di Vico Equense. Nel quale si contengono i gloriosi gesti de i beati apostoli, S. Andrea, S. Matteo, S. Bartolomeo, et S. Tommaso. Con le inuentioni, et traslationi delle loro sacre reliquie, fatte in diuersi tempi et luoghi. Et co' i loro miracoli continuamente operati .. · Volume 2 [Second book of the lives of the saints. Described by Monsignor Paolo Regio, bishop of Vico Equense. In which are contained the glorious gestures of the blessed apostles, St. Andrew, St. Matthew, St. Bartholomew, and St. Thomas. With the donations and translations of their sacred relics, made in different times and places. And with their miracles continually worked .. · Volume 2] (in Italian). appresso Gioseppe Cacchi.
- Frater Filippo Ferrari (1625). G. Gueriglio (ed.). Catalogus generalis Sanctorum qui in Martyrologio Romano non sunt... in duodecim menses instar martyrologii distributus, suis ubique notis appositis... Urbano Papae VIII dicatus [A general catalog of Saints who they are not in the Roman Martyrology... distributed over twelve months like a martyrology, with his marks affixed everywhere... dedicated to Pope Urban VIII] (in Latin). Venice (VE).
- Bonaventure da Sorrento (1877). "9.━S.Prisco Vesc.━" [9.━S.Prisco Vesc.━]. Sorrento Sorrento sacra e Sorrento illustre. Epitome della storia sorrentina pel p. Bonaventura da Sorrento [Sorrento Sacred Sorrento and illustrious Sorrento. Epitome of Sorrento history for p. Bonaventure of Sorrento] (in Italian). Sorrento (SA).

=== Historical sources ===
- Adonis from Vienna. Le martyrologe d'Adon ses deux familles, ses trois recensions: texte et commentaire [The martyrology of Adon, his two families, his three recensions: text and commentary] (in Latin).
- Lucio Baldini (1562). Vita Sancti Prisci Episcopi [Life of Saint Priscius, Bishop] (in Latin). Naples (NA).
- Paolo Regio (1593). Dell'opere spirituali [Of spiritual works] (in Italian). Vico Equense (SA).
- Paolo Regio (1883). Vita di san Prisco — vescovo e confessore [Life of Saint Priscus — bishop and confessor] (in Italian) (2nd ed.). Naples (NA).
- Vincenzio Davino (1878). Cav. Pietro Marietti (ed.). Enciclopedia dell 'ecclesiastico [Ecclesiastic's Encyclopedia] (in Italian). Vol. 3. pp. 433 and 434. "San Prisco was the first bishop of the city of Nocera dè Pagani but, there is no certain and reliable information on his life and his origins, the only historian to talk about it is San Paolino da Nola."
- Gennaro Orlando (1884). Storia di Nocera de' Pagani [History of Nocera de' Pagani] (in Italian). Vol. 1. Naples (NA): Tocco.
- Mario Vassalluzzo (1994). In Cammino (ed.). S. Prisco e successori nella plurimillenaria Chiesa Nocerina [S. Prisco and successors in the thousand-year-old Nocerina Church] (in Italian). In Cammino.
- Roberto Farruggio (2007). Editrice Gaia (ed.). Sulle orme dello spirito santo. Nel bimillenariocammino della chiesa priscana [In the footsteps of the holy spirit. In the two thousand year journey of the Priscan church] (in Italian). Editrice Gaia. ISBN 9788889821121.
- Carmine Citarella; Mario Vassalluzzo (2011). Priscana — raccolta delle conferenze per le giornate priscane 2000–2011, Diocesi di Nocera Inferiore-Sarno [Priscana — collection of conferences for the Priscana days 2000–2011, Diocese of Nocera Inferiore-Sarno] (in Italian) (Bollettino Diocesano ed.). Nocera Inferiore (SA).
- Il restauro della statua di San Prisco Vescovo. Cenni storici sulla vita del Santo (May 2012). Franco Gargiulo (ed.). Il restauro della statua di San Prisco vescovo. Cenni storici sulla vita del santo [The restoration of the statue of San Prisco Bishop. Historical notes on the life of the Saint] (in Italian). N. Longobardi. ISBN 9788880903994.
- Agostino Russo; Egidio Valcaccia; Alessandra Cacace; Franco Gargiulo (May 2012). Franco Gargiulo (ed.). Il restauro della statua di San Prisco vescovo cenni storici sulla vita del santo [The restoration of the statue of San Prisco bishop historical notes on the life of the saint] (in Italian). N. Longobardi. ISBN 9788880903994.
- Gennaro Zurolo (2013). Vita di San Prisco. Primo Vescovo della città di Nocera (alla luce di documenti inediti del XVI secolo) [Life of Saint Priscus. First Bishop of the city of Nocera (in light of unpublished documents from the 16th century)] (in Latin and Italian). Angri (SA): Onlus PanacèA.
- Antonio Braca; Vincenzo Piccolo (2023). La Cattedrale di San Prisco in Nocera Inferiore [The Cathedral of San Prisco in Nocera Inferiore] (in Italian). ISBN 9788894503616.

=== Historical novels ===
- Andrea Calenda di Tavani (1886). Valdemaro Vecchi (ed.). Ramondello Orsino, storia napoletana del Trecento [Ramondello Orsino, Neapolitan history of the fourteenth century]. Vol. I. Trani (BT).

== See also ==
- Nocera Alfaterna
- Nocera dei Pagani
- Nocera Inferiore
- Bishops
- Saints
