= Domenico Giacobazzi =

Italian Roman Catholic bishop and cardinal

Domenico Giacobazzi (1444–1528) was an Italian Roman Catholic bishop and cardinal.

== Biography ==
Domenico Giacobazzi was born in Rome in 1444, the son of a Roman patrician, Cristoforo Giacobazzi de Facheschis. He was the uncle of Cardinal Girolamo Verallo. He studied Christian theology, civil law, and canon law and became a consistorial advocate in 1485. In 1493, he became an Auditor of the Roman Rota, later becoming its dean. He became a canon of the cathedral chapter of St. Peter's Basilica in 1503.

On 8 November 1511 he was elected Bishop of Nocera dei Pagani. He held that office until 14 August 1517, when he resigned in favor of his brother Andrea Giacobazzi. He participated in the Fifth Council of the Lateran. He became the pope's vicar general.

Giacobazzi was an eminent canonist whose Tractatus de concilio (1511-1523) later prefaced Mansi's Amplissima collectio'. In 1516, he served on a panel of judges tasked with reviewing a work by noted Hebraist Johann Reuchlin. Although the decision was really for Reuchlin, the trial was simply quashed. He also reviewed the decrees of Cardinal de' Medici's 1517 provincial council of Florence, for approval by Pope Leo X.

Pope Leo X made him a cardinal priest in the consistory of 1 July 1517. He received the red hat and the titular church of San Lorenzo in Panisperna on 6 July 1517. On 10 July 1517 he opted for the titular church of San Bartolomeo all'Isola, then, on 20 August 1519, for San Clemente. He was the administrator of the see of Cassano from 2 December 1519 until 23 March 1523.

He participated in both the papal conclave of 1521-22 that elected Pope Adrian VI, and in the papal conclave of 1523 that elected Pope Clement VII.

In 1524, he became Bishop of Nocera dei Pagani for a second time following the death of his brother. He was Camerlengo of the Sacred College of Cardinals from 11 January 1527 to 1528.

He died in Rome in 1528 and is buried in Sant'Eustachio.

Catholic Church titles
Preceded by Bernardino Orsini	Bishop of Nocera de' Pagani (1st term); 1511–1517	Succeeded by Andrea Giacobazzi
Preceded by	Cardinal-Priest of San Lorenzo in Panisperna; 1517	Succeeded by Stanislaw Hosius
Preceded by Egidio da Viterbo	Cardinal-Priest of San Bartolomeo all'Isola; 1517–1519	Succeeded by Jean Le Veneur
Preceded by Luigi de' Rossi	Cardinal-Priest of San Clemente; 1519–1528	Succeeded by Andrea Matteo Palmieri
Preceded by Nicola Tomacelli	Administrator of Cassano all'Jonio; 1519–1523	Succeeded by Cristoforo Giacobazzi
Preceded by Andrea Giacobazzi	Bishop of Nocera de' Pagani (2nd term); 1524–1528	Succeeded by Paolo Giovio
Records
Preceded by Tamás Bakócz	Oldest living Member of the Sacred College; 11 June 1521 - 1528	Succeeded by Pietro Accolti
