= 2007 in rugby union =

Here are the match results of the 2007 Rugby union season. Qualifiers for the 2011 Rugby World Cup, meanwhile the Six Nations Championship and the Tri Nations was also set for another season.

== International competitions ==
- 113th Six Nations Championship series is won by France
- 2007 Rugby World Cup held in stadiums throughout France, with matches also held in Edinburgh and Cardiff. South Africa beat defending champions England in the final 15–6 to win the World Cup.
- 2007 Super 14 Final at ABSA Stadium, Durban – The Bulls score a converted try after the final horn to defeat the homestanding Sharks 20–19, becoming the first South African team to win the Super Rugby competition in its professional era.
- 2007 Heineken Cup Final at Twickenham, London – London Wasps deny Leicester Tigers a treble with a 25–9 win.

Domestic competitions

- English Premiership – Leicester Tigers
- Top 14 – Stade Français
- Celtic League – Ospreys
- EDF Energy Cup – Leicester Tigers
- Air New Zealand Cup – Auckland
- Currie Cup – Free State Cheetahs
- Australian Rugby Championship – Central Coast Rays

== See also ==
- 2007 in sports
