= Cristoforo Giacobazzi =

Italian Roman Catholic bishop and cardinal

Cristoforo Giacobazzi (1499-1540) was an Italian Roman Catholic bishop and cardinal.

== Biography ==
Giacobazzi was born in Rome, the son of Jacomo Giacobazzi and Camilla de Astallis. He was the nephew of Cardinal Domenico Giacobazzi, who took responsibility for Cristoforo's education.

On 21 February 1517, he became a canon of the cathedral chapter of St. Peter's Basilica. He was elected bishop of Cassano on 23 March 1523 when his uncle resigned the see in his favour. He later became an auditor of the Roman Rota. From October 1534 to December 1536, he was a datary. On 23 August 1535, he was named to a commission charged with studying reform of the Roman Curia.

Pope Paul III created him a cardinal priest in the consistory of 22 December 1536. He received the red hat on 23 December 1536, and the titular church of Sant'Anastasia on 15 January 1537. On 6 September 1537, he opted for the titular church of Sant'Eustachio, a deaconry raised pro illa vice to title, though he maintained his former titular church in commendam.

On 10 December 1537, he and Cardinal Rodolfo Pio da Carpi, was named papal legate to restore the peace between Charles V, Holy Roman Emperor and Francis I of France (though the cardinals were not informed of the legation until the consistory celebrated in Piacenza on 30 April 1538). On 21 April 1539, he was made legate to Perugia and Umbria.

He died in Perugia on 7 October 1540 and was buried there.

Catholic Church titles
Preceded by Domenico Giacobazzi	Bishop of Cassano all'Jonio; 1523–1540	Succeeded by Durante Duranti
Preceded by Antoine du Prat	Cardinal-Priest of Sant'Anastasia; 1537	Succeeded by Robert de Lenoncourt (cardinal)
Preceded by Agostino Trivulzio	Cardinal-Priest of Sant'Eustachio; 1537–1540	Succeeded by Guido Ascanio Sforza di Santa Fiora
