= Paolo Giovio =

Italian prelate, physician and biographer (1483–1552)

- Bishop of Nocera de' Pagani
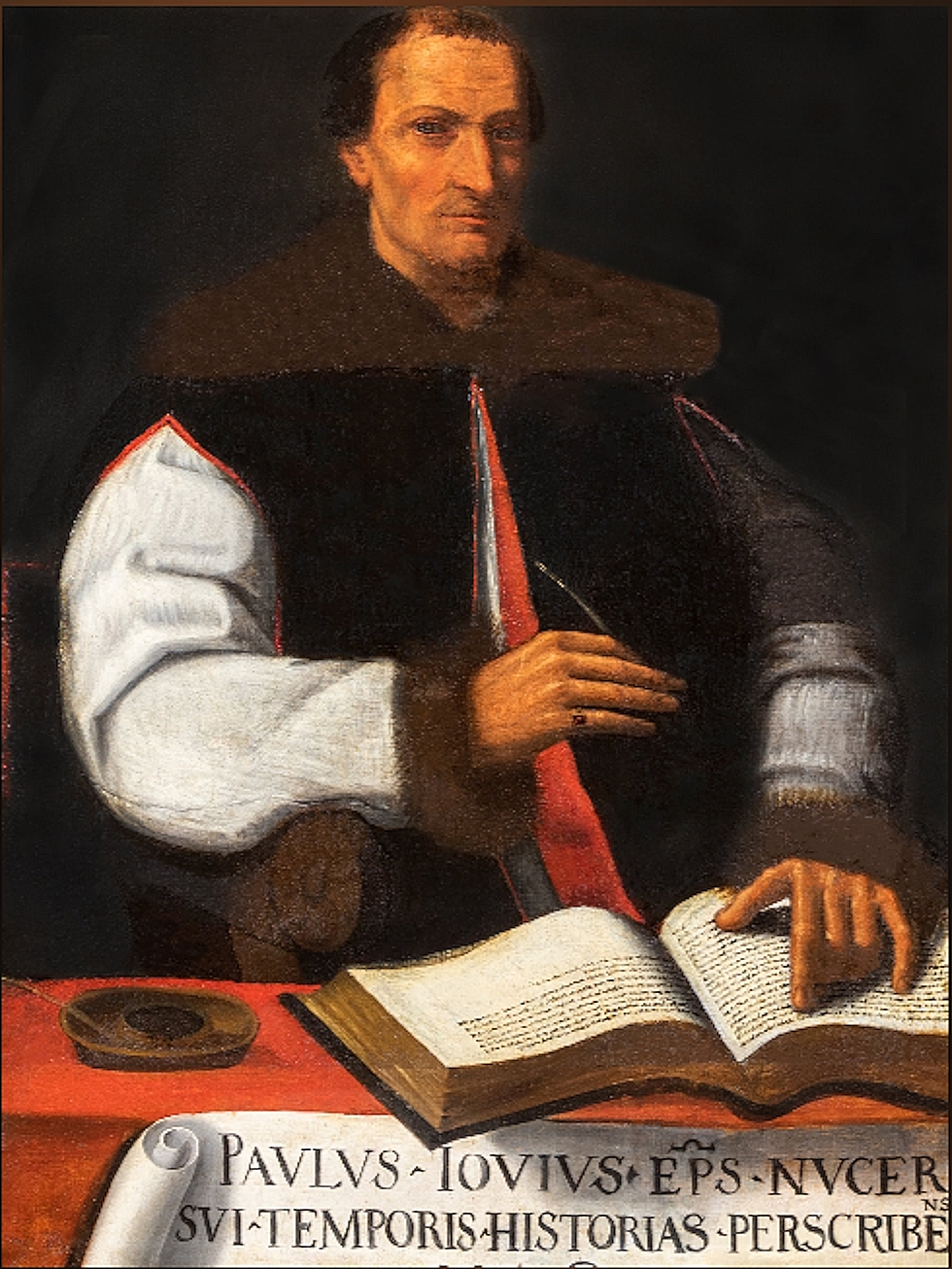
- Portrait of Paolo Giovio, commissioned by himself. Pinacoteca civica di Como
- Church: Catholic Church
- Diocese: Diocese of Nocera de' Pagani
- In office: 1528–1552
- Predecessor: Domenico Giacobazzi
- Successor: Giulio Giovio

Orders
- Consecration: 17 Apr 1533 by Gabriele Mascioli Foschi

Personal details
- Born: 19 April 1483 Isola Comacina of Lake Como
- Died: 11 December 1552 (aged 69) Florence

Paolo Giovio (also spelled Paulo Jovio; Latin: Paulus Jovius; 19 April 1483 – 11 December 1552) was an Italian physician, historian, biographer, and prelate.

== Early life ==
Little is known about Giovio's youth. He was a native of Como; his family was from the Isola Comacina of Lake Como. He belonged to the Zanobi, one of the oldest and most prominent families in Como, and was devoted to his cultural patrimony, especially to Como's great historians, the elder and younger Pliny.

His father, a notary, died around 1500. His guardian and mentor was his elder brother, Benedetto Giovio (1471– c. 1545), a prominent civic figure, local historian and antiquarian who, among other projects, was involved with Cesare Cesariano on the translation and annotation of Vitruvius' De architectura (Como, 1521).

In compliance with his brother's wishes, Paolo trained as a physician in Pavia and Padua (1498–1507), studying with Marcantonio della Torre and Pietro Pomponazzi. He graduated in 1511.

== Career ==
Giovio worked as physician in Como but, after the plague spread in that city he moved to Rome, settling there in 1513. He remained at the papal court for most of his career, moving among the great political and intellectual figures of the day and becoming a member of the Accademia della Virtù and the Accademia degli Intronati. Pope Leo X assigned him a cathedra (chair) of Moral Philosophy and, later, that of Natural Philosophy in the Roman university. He was also knighted by the Pope. In the same period he started to write historical essays. He wrote a memoir of Leo soon after his death.

In 1517, Giovio was appointed as the personal physician for Cardinal Giulio di Giuliano de' Medici (the future Pope Clement VII). In the field he wrote some treatises, like the De optima victus ratione, in which he expresses his doubts about the current pharmacology, and the need to improve prevention before the cure.

Giovio helped Clement VII during the 1527 sack of Rome. From 1526 to 1528, he stayed on the island of Ischia as Vittoria Colonna's guest. In 1528, he became bishop of Nocera de' Pagani. Giovio wrote an account of Dmitry Gerasimov's embassy to Clement VII, which related detailed geographical data on Muscovy.

In 1536, Giovio had a villa built for him on Lake Como, which he called Museo, and which he used for his collection of portraits of famous soldiers and men of letters. After Clement's death, he retired. As well as paintings, he sought antiquities, etc., and his collection was one of the first to include pieces from the New World. A set of copies of the paintings from the collection, now known as the Giovio Series, is on display in the Uffizi Gallery.

== Death ==
In 1549, Pope Paul III denied Giovio the title of Bishop of Como, and he moved to Florence, where he died in 1552.

== Works ==
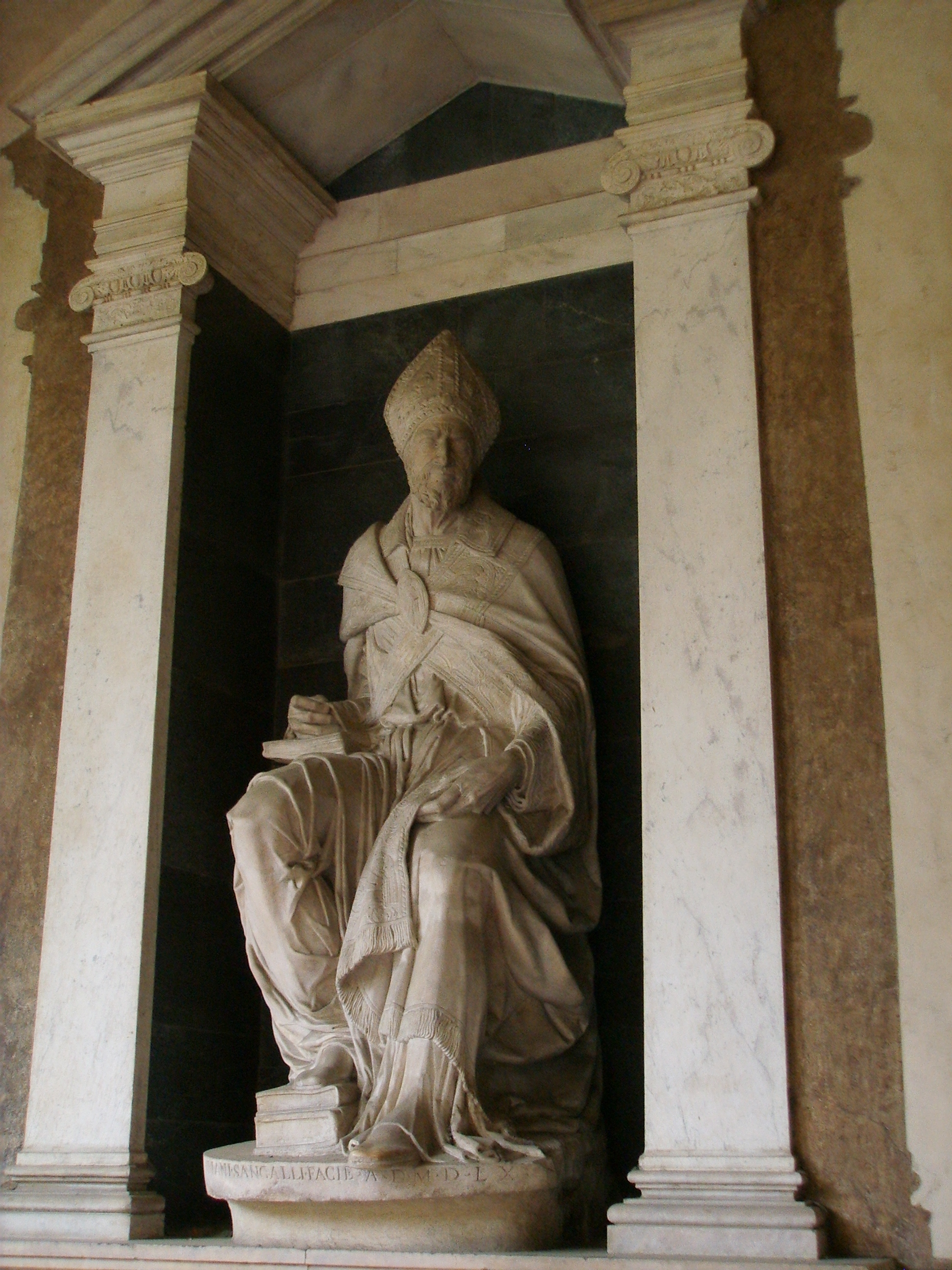
Monument to Paolo Giovo by Francesco da Sangallo, in San Lorenzo Basilica, Florence

Giovio is chiefly known as the author of a celebrated work of contemporary history, Historiarum sui temporis libri XLV, of a collection of lives of famous men, Vitae virorum illustrium (1549‑57), and of Elogia virorum bellica virtute illustrium, (Florence, 1554), which may be translated as Praise of Men Illustrious for Courage in War (1554).

Giovio is best remembered as a chronicler of the Italian Wars. In his work, La prima parte dell'historie del suo tempo, Giovio claimed that Italian soldiers were despised following the Leagues' defeat at Fornovo. His eyewitness accounts of many of the battles form one of the most significant primary sources for the period. Many pages of his work are devoted to Skanderbeg.

He is the oldest biographer of Raphael.

Giovio's notable work include:

- De romanis piscibus (1524)
- De legatione Basilii Magni Principis Moschoviae (1525)
- Comentario de le cose de' Turchi (1532)
- Elogia virorum litteris illustrium or Elogia doctorum virorum (1546)
- Descriptio Britanniae, Scotiae, Hyberniae et Orchadum (1548)
- Vitae (1549)
- Pauli Jovii historiarum sui temporis (1550–52)
- Elogia virorum bellica virtute illustrium (1551), as an eyewitness of many historical figures, and people involved in the Italian Wars including Gonzalo Fernández de Córdoba
- Dialogo dell'imprese militari et amorose (1555)

== Sources ==
- Oman, Charles (1937). A History of the Art of War in the Sixteenth Century. London: Methuen & Co.
- Zimmerman, T. C. (1995). Paolo Giovio: The Historian and the Crisis of Sixteenth-Century Italy. Princeton, NJ: Princeton University Press. ISBN 9781400821839.
- Giovio, Paolo (2013). Gouwens, Kenneth (ed.). Notable Men and Women of Our Time. The I Tatti Library. Cambridge, MA: Harvard University Press. ISBN 9780674055056.
- Santosuosso, Antonio (1994). "Anatomy of Defeat in Renaissance Italy: The Battle of Fornovo in 1495". The International History Review. 16 (2 (May)). Taylor & Francis Ltd: 221–250. doi:10.1080/07075332.1994.9640674. "In the sixteenth century, Paolo Giovio claimed that the defeat ruined the reputation of Italian soldiers, causing foreigners to despise them and beginning a chain of events which made Italy a servant."

Catholic Church titles
Preceded by Domenico Giacobazzi	Bishop of Nocera de' Pagani; 1528–1552	Succeeded by Giulio Giovio
