= Diocese of Nocera Inferiore-Sarno =

Roman Catholic diocese in Italy

Coordinates: 40.7444°N 14.6417°E

Diocese of Nocera dei Pagani-Sarno Nocera Inferiore-Sarno Dioecesis Nucerina Paganorum-Sarnensis

Catholic
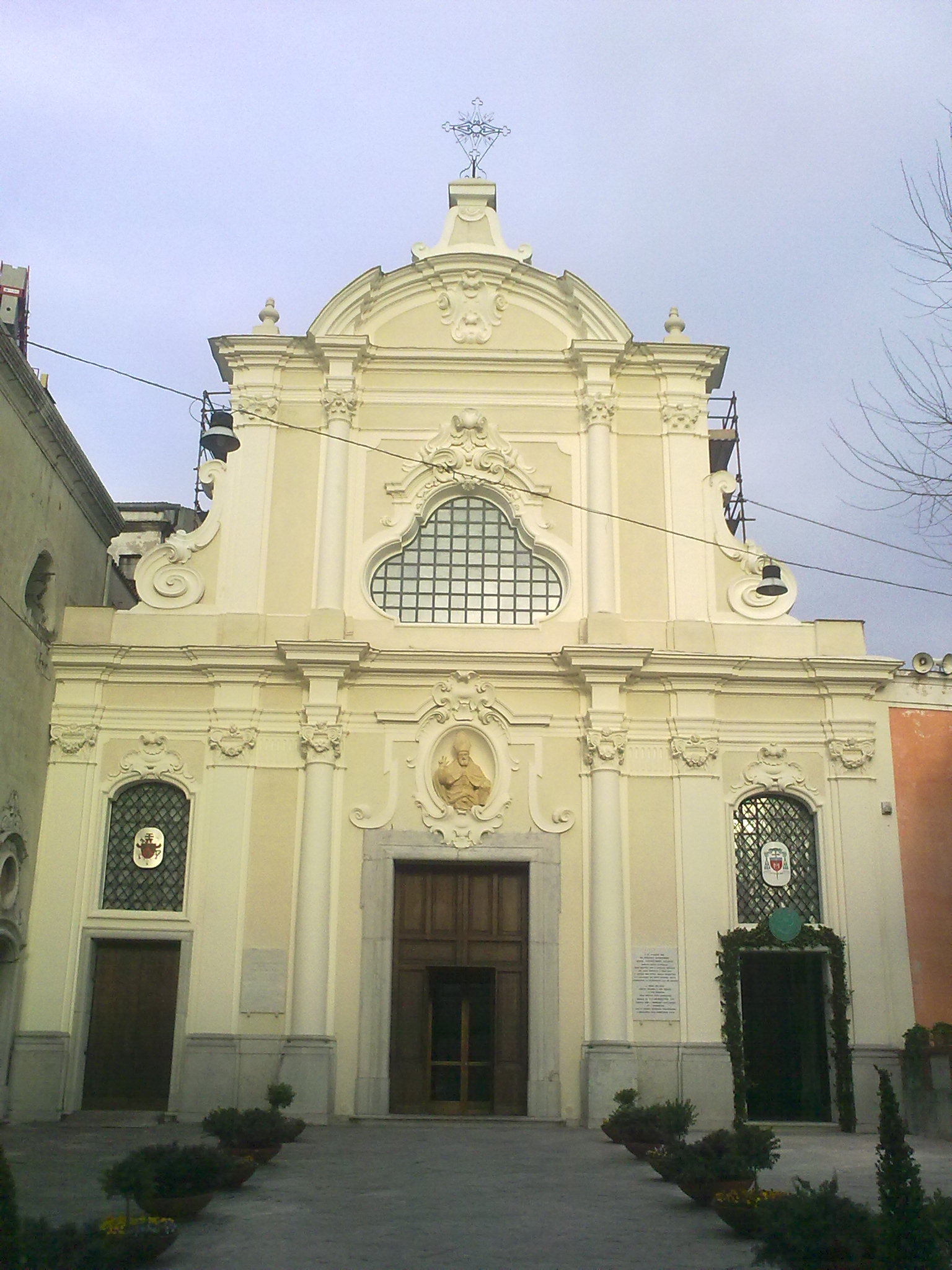
- Cathedral of S. Priscus

Location
- Country: Italy
- Ecclesiastical region: Campania

Statistics
- Area: 157 km^{2} (61 sq mi)
- Population: Total; Catholics: (as of 2023); 240,350 (est.) ▼; 228,300 ▼ (est.)
- Parishes: 54

Information
- Rite: Roman Rite
- Established: 4th century?
- Archdiocese: Salerno-Campagna-Acerno
- Cathedral: St. Priscus Cathedral, Nocera Inferiore
- Co-cathedral: St. Michael Cathedral, Sarno
- Patron saint: Priscus of Nocera; Michael (archangel); Alphonsus Liguori
- Secular priests: 75 (diocesan); 50 (Religious Orders); 7 Permanent Deacons

Current leadership
- Pope: Leo XIV
- Bishop: Giuseppe Giudice

Website
- https://www.diocesinocerasarno.it/ (in Italian)

The Diocese of Nocera dei Pagani-Sarno (Note: Often shortened as Nocera de' Pagani.) (Latin: Dioecesis Nucerina Paganorum-Sarnensis; Italian: Diocesi di Nocera Inferiore-Sarno), known officially as the Diocese of Nocera Inferiore-Sarno, is a Latin Church diocese of the Catholic Church located in the Campania region of Italy. The city is 43 km northeast of Sorrento by road, and 21 km northwest of Salerno. It is a suffragan of the Archdiocese of Salerno-Campagna-Acerno.

== History ==
Saint Priscus was reckoned by the people of Nocera as their first bishop. The era of his activity is a matter of contention.

In the bulls for the canonical investiture of the archbishops of Salerno, from 993 to 1058, which mention the suffragan dioceses of Salerno, the name of Nocera is not found. Nor is the name of a bishop of Norcia found in the narration of the consecration of the abbey church of Montecassino by Pope Alexander II in 1071.

The city of Nocera was levelled by King Roger II of Sicily in 1138, and its name does not appear in the list of suffragan bishops of Salerno in the privilege granted by Pope Alexander III on 14 March 1169. Neither is Nocera mentioned in the Liber censuum of Cencius Camerarius of 1192. The date of its restoration is unknown.

In 1260, the people of Nocera murdered their bishop, for which Pope Alexander IV suppressed the bishopric, and divided up its territory between the dioceses of Salerno and Amalfi. Boniface VIII decreed the reestablishmeent of the diocese in 1299, but his order was never carried out. The diocese of Nocera was finally restored by Urban VI in 1386, and was a suffragan of the archbishop of Salerno until 1818.

The Bishop of Nocera, Paolo Giovio, paid a pastoral visit to Nocera, which he governed through vicars during his term, in the autumn of 1531. His financial agent in the diocese was the Florentine businessman Tomasso Cambi. He was responsible for the restoration of the fabric of the cathedral and of the episcopal palace.

Bishop Emiddio Lenti (1685–1691) held a diocesan synod in 1689. Bishop Sebastiano Perissi (1692–1700) held a diocesan synod in 1695, and issued a set of constitutions for the diocese. The Constitutions of 1689 state that, as confirmed by the Papacy, the bishop enjoyed ordinary jurisdiction in civil and mixed cases over certain families of Nocera, as Baro and Dominus, and that he appointed annually over these people a captain and a judge (JUD). The governors of the Feudatories had no jurisdiction over these people.

=== Chapter and cathedral ===
The cathedral had originally been the church of the Benedictine monastery of S. Priscus, according to an inscription of 1088. The building was often damaged by earthquakes, and often restored. Cardinal Giacobazzi (1511–1517) began one such rebuilding; the elder Paolo Giovio (1528–1552) also presided over rebuilding work. On 5 June 1688, a major earthquake shook and damaged both the cathedral and the episcopal palace. Bishop Emiddio Lenti (1685–1691) began the reconstruction with his own funds, after the magistrates his plea for a subsidy for the work. Bishop Gherardo Antonio Volpe (1744–1768) and Bishop Benedetto Maria dei Monti Sanfelice, O.S.B. (1768–1806) compleely rebuilt the cathedral in the second half of the 18th century.

The cathedral was served and administered by an ecclesiastical body called the Chapter. In the medieval period, it was composed of three dignities (the Archdeacon, the Archpriest, and the Primicerius) and eight canons. The archpriest served as the pastor of the cathedral parish. In 1635, Bishop Ippolito Francone added four more canons, making twelve. Four more were added from a bequest of Archdeacon Amora, making the total number of canons sixteen. In 1664, Bishop Felice Gabrieli instituted a fourth dignity in the Chapter, called the Cantor.

=== Seminary ===
The idea of a seminary ws first proposed by Bishop Giovio the Younger in 1564, following the decrees of the Council of Trent. Financing was the usual problem, which occupied the bishops over the next century. Two convents were suppressed, the Benedictine one of S. Maria and the Carmelite one of S. Maria, but obtaining possession was met with opposition until Bishop Perissi took the matter directly to Pope Innocent XII, who issued a decree in 1694, confirming the suppressions and threatening penalties against the obstructionists. The seminary began to prosper, then under Bishop Caraffa (1700–1715). Bishop Gherardo Antonio Volpe (1744–1768) rebuilt the structure. The seminary taught a narrow curriculum of canon and civil law, philosophy, and scholastic and dogmatic theology.

=== Concordat of 1818 ===
Following the extinction of the Napoleonic Kingdom of Italy, the Congress of Vienna authorized the restoration of the Papal States and the Kingdom of Naples. Since the French occupation had seen the abolition of many Church institutions in the Kingdom, as well as the confiscation of most Church property and resources, it was imperative that Pope Pius VII and King Ferdinand IV reach agreement on restoration and restitution. Ferdinand, however, was not prepared to accept the pre-Napoleonic situation, in which Naples was a feudal subject of the papacy. Lengthy, detailed, and acrimonious negotiations ensued.

In 1818, a new concordat with the Kingdom of the Two Sicilies committed the pope to the suppression of more than fifty small dioceses in the kingdom. The ecclesiastical province of Salerno was affected. Pope Pius VII, in the bull "De Utiliori" of 27 June 1818, chose to suppress the diocese of Nocera de'Pagani completely, and assign its people and territory to the diocese of Cava de'Terreni. In the same concordat, the King was confirmed in the right to nominate candidates for vacant bishoprics, subject to the approval of the pope. That situation persisted down until the final overthrow of the Bourbon monarchy in 1860.

=== Restoration of the diocese ===
The diocese of Nocera was restored on 5 December 1833 by Pope Gregory XVI, in the bull "In Vinea Domini." In accordance with the Concordat of 1818, King Ferdinand II of the Two Sicilies nominated Agnello Giuseppe d'Auria Loffredo of Naples to the bishopric of Nocera on 22 February 1834, and he was duly confirmed by Pope Gregory XVI on 23 June 1834.

=== Diocesan reorganization ===
The Second Vatican Council (1962–1965), in order to ensure that all Catholics received proper spiritual attention, decreed the reorganization of the diocesan structure of Italy and the consolidation of small and struggling dioceses. It also recommended the abolition of anomalous units such as exempt territorial prelatures.

On 18 February 1984, the Vatican and the Italian State signed a new and revised concordat. Based on the revisions, a set of Normae was issued on 15 November 1984, which was accompanied in the next year, on 3 June 1985, by enabling legislation. According to the agreement, the practice of having one bishop govern two separate dioceses at the same time, aeque personaliter, was abolished. Instead, the Vatican continued consultations which had begun under Pope John XXIII for the merging of small dioceses, especially those with personnel and financial problems, into one combined diocese.

On 30 September 1986, Pope John Paul II ordered that the dioceses of Nocera de'Pagani and Sarno be merged into one diocese with one bishop, with the Latin title Dioecesis Nucerina Paganorum-Sarnensis The seat of the diocese was to be in Nocera. The former cathedral in Sarno would be designated a "co-cathedral", though there was to be only one cathedral Chapter; the former Chapter of Sarno was to be designated the Chapter of the Co-Cathedral. There was to be one seminary.

== Bishops ==
=== Diocese of Nocera dei Pagani ===
Erected: 4th century
Latin name: Nuceria Paganorum
Metropolitan: Archdiocese of Salerno-Acerno

==== To 1400 ====
...

- Priscus (III-IV)

...

- Felix (401–417)

...

- Aprilis (c. 502)

...

- Numerius (c. 593)
- Primenius (c. 598)

...

- Amatus (Amantius) (c. 743)

...
[ Lando (1063) ]
...

- Felix
- Valerius Orsini
- [Ignotus] (d. 1260)
- Placidus
- Philippus
- Jannetus
- Franciscus, O.Min. (c. 1386/1389–1402)

==== From 1400 to 1700 ====
- Angelus (1402–1429?)
- Gabriel de Spoleto, O.E.S.A. (1429–1433)
- Giuliano Angrerani (1433–1436)
- Giacopo Benedetti (1436–1443)
- Bartolommeo Micheli (1443–1455)
- Petrus, O.P. (1455–1478)
- Giovanni Cerretani (1478–1479)
- Pietro Strambone, O.P. (1479–1503)
- Bernardinus Orsini (1503–1511)
- Domenico Jacobazzi (1511–1517)
- Andrea Jacobazzi (1517–1534)
- Cardinal Domenico Giacobazzi (1524–1528)
- Paolo Giovio (il Vecchio) (1528–1552)
- Giulio Giovio (1552–1560 Resigned)
- Paolo Giovio (il Giovane) (1560–1585)
- Sulpizio Costantino (1585–1602)
- Simone Lunadori (1602–1610)
- Stefano de Vicari, O.P. (1610–1620)
- Francesco Trivulzio (1621–1631)
- Ippolito Franconi (1632–1653)
- Bonaventura D'Avalos, O.S.A. (1654–1659 Resigned)
- Felice Gabrielli, O.F.M. Conv. (1659–1684)
- Emiddio Lenti (1685–1691 Died)
- Sebastiano Perissi (1692–1700)

==== From 1700 to 1818 ====
- Giovanbattista Carafa (1700–1715)
- Niccolò di Domenico (1718–1744)
- Gherardo Antonio Volpe (1744–1768)
- Benedetto Maria dei Monti Sanfelice, O.S.B. (1768–1806)

Sede vacante (1806–1818)

The diocese was suppressed from 1818 to 1833

==== From 1834 to 1986 ====
- Agnello Giuseppe d'Auria Loffredo (1834–1860)
- Michele Adinolfi (1860–1863)

Sede vacante (1863–1871)

- Raffaele Ammirante (1871–1881)
- Francesco Vitagliano (1882–1885 Resigned)
- Luigi del Forno (1885–1913)
- Giuseppe Romeo (1913–1935)
- Teodorico de Angelis (1936–1951 Resigned)
- Fortunato Zoppas (1952–1964 Resigned)

Sede vacante (1964–1971)

- Jolando Nuzzi (1971–1986)

=== Diocese of Nocera Inferiore-Sarno ===
30 September 1986: United with the territory of the historical Diocese of Sarno, which was previously merged into the Diocese of Cava e Sarno since 1818.

- Gioacchino Illiano (1987–2011 Retired)
- Giuseppe Giudice (2011–)

== See also ==
- Diocese of Sarno

== Sources ==
=== Cited works ===
- Eubel, Conradus, ed. (1913). Hierarchia catholica (in Latin). Vol. 1 (Tomus 1) (second ed.). Münster: Libreria Regensbergiana. p. 314.. Archived.
- Eubel, Conradus, ed. (1914). Hierarchia catholica (in Latin). Vol. 2 (Tomus 2) (second ed.). Münster: Libreria Regensbergiana. p. 181.. Archived.
- Eubel, Conradus, ed. (1923). Hierarchia catholica (in Latin). Vol. 3 (Tomus 3) (second ed.). Münster: Libreria Regensbergiana. p. 163.. Archived.
- Gams, Pius Bonifatius (1873). Series episcoporum Ecclesiae catholicae: quotquot innotuerunt a beato Petro apostolo. Ratisbon: Typis et Sumptibus Georgii Josephi Manz. pp. 906–907. (Use with caution; obsolete)
- Gauchat, Patritius (Patrice) (1935). Hierarchia catholica (in Latin). Vol. IV (1592–1667). Münster: Libraria Regensbergiana.
- Ritzler, Remigius; Sefrin, Pirminus (1952). Hierarchia catholica medii et recentis aevi (in Latin). Vol. V (1667–1730). Patavii: Messagero di S. Antonio.
- Ritzler, Remigius; Sefrin, Pirminus (1958). Hierarchia catholica medii et recentis aevi (in Latin). Vol. 6 (1730–1799). Patavii: Messagero di S. Antonio.
- Ritzler, Remigius; Sefrin, Pirminus (1968). Hierarchia Catholica medii et recentioris aevi (in Latin). Vol. 7 (1800–1846). Monasterii: Libr. Regensburgiana.
- Ritzler, Remigius; Sefrin, Pirminus (1978). Hierarchia catholica Medii et recentioris aevi (in Latin). Vol. 8 (1846–1903). Il Messaggero di S. Antonio.
- Pięta, Zenon (2002). Hierarchia catholica medii et recentioris aevi (in Latin). Vol. 9 (1903–1922). Padua: Messagero di San Antonio. ISBN 978-88-250-1000-8.

=== Studies ===
- Cappelletti, Giuseppe (1870). Le chiese d'Italia: dalla loro origine sino ai nostri giorni (in Italian). Vol. 21 (vigesimoprimo). Venezia: G. Antonelli. pp. 511–514.
- D'Avino, Vincenzo (1848). Cenni storici sulle chiese arcivescovili, vescovili, e prelatizie (nulluis) del Regno delle Due Sicilie (in Italian). Napoli: Ranucci. pp. 481–488. [Article by Gennaro Orlando]
- Kehr, Paul Fridolin. Italia Pontificia (in Latin), Vol. VIII: Regnum Normannum — Campania (Berlin: Weidmann 1935). pp. 304–308.
- Lanzoni, Francesco (1927). Le diocesi d'Italia dalle origini al principio del secolo VII (an. 604) (in Italian). Rome: Biblioteca Apostolica Vaticana. pp. 242–245.
