= 2017–18 RSC Anderlecht season =

Anderlecht
2017–18 season
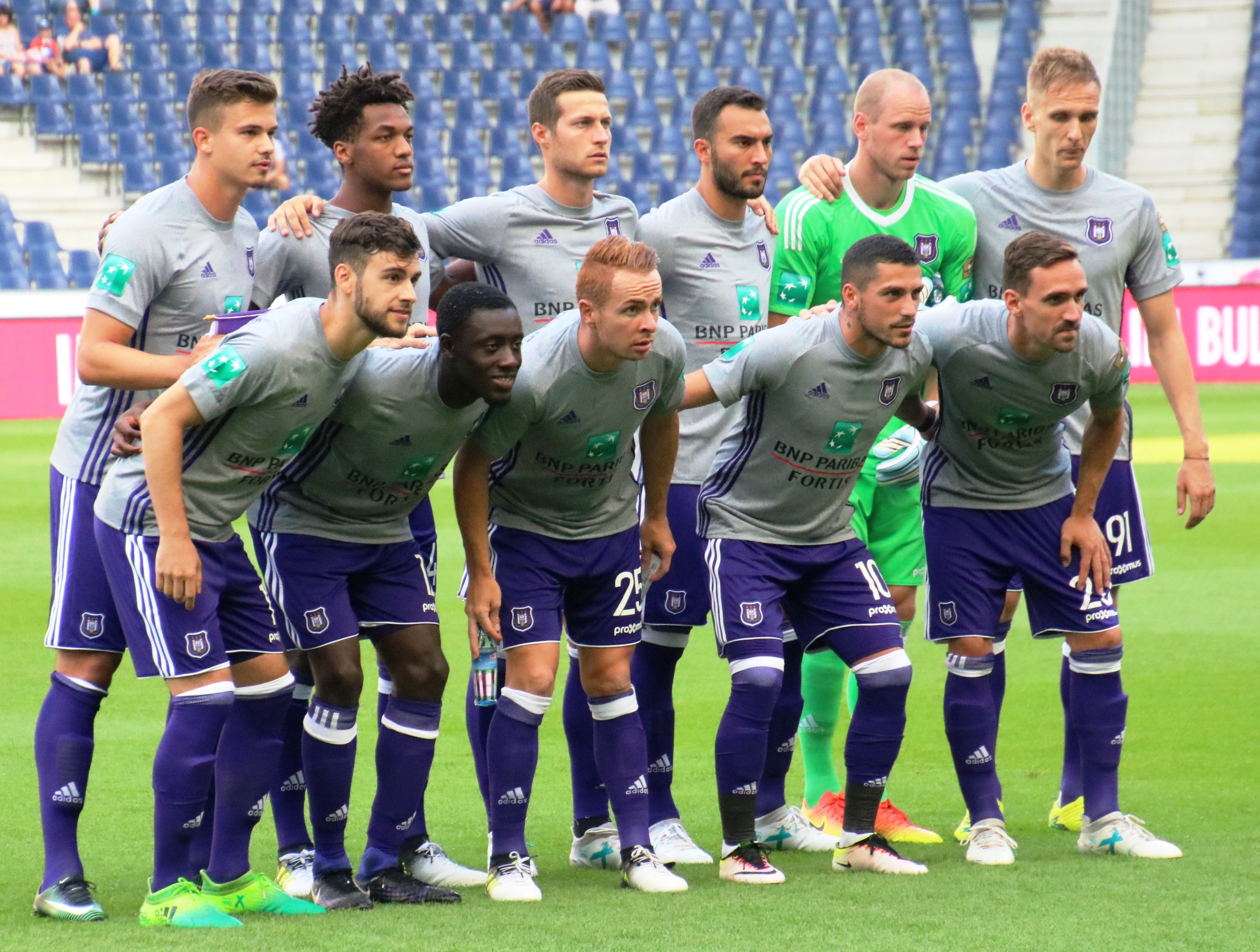
- Chairman: Roger Vanden Stock
- Manager: René Weiler (until 18 September); Hein Vanhaezebrouck (from 3 October)
- Ground: Constant Vanden Stock Stadium
- Belgian First Division A: 3rd
- Belgian Cup: Seventh round
- Belgian Super Cup: Winners
- Champions League: Group stage
- Top goalscorer: League: Łukasz Teodorczyk (15); All: Łukasz Teodorczyk (15)
- Average home league attendance: 19,275
Home colours	Away colours	Third colours

The 2017–18 season is a season played by Anderlecht, a Belgian football club based in Anderlecht, Brussels. The season covers the period from 1 July 2017 to 30 June 2018. Anderlecht will be participating in the Belgian First Division A, Belgian Super Cup, Belgian Cup and the UEFA Champions League.

== Review and events ==
After winning the 2016–17 First Division A, Anderlecht opened the 2017–18 season with a Belgian Super Cup victory over Zulte Waregem, winners of the 2016–17 Belgian Cup in the first Belgian football match to feature the use of a video assistant referee.

== Match details ==
=== Regular season ===
Pos	Team	Pld	W	D	L	GF	GA	GD	Pts	Qualification or relegation
1	Club Brugge	30	20	7	3	68	33	+35	67	Qualification for the championship play-offs
2	Anderlecht	30	16	7	7	49	42	+7	55	Qualification for the championship play-offs
3	Charleroi	30	13	12	5	46	30	+16	51	Qualification for the championship play-offs
4	Gent	30	14	8	8	45	27	+18	50	Qualification for the championship play-offs
5	Genk	30	11	11	8	44	36	+8	44	Qualification for the championship play-offs

Source: Belgian First Division A (in Dutch), Soccerway
Rules for classification: 1) Points; 2) Matches won; 3) Goal difference; 4) Goals scored; 5) Away goals scored; 6) Away matches won; 7) Play-off.

==== Matches ====
Belgian First Division A match details
Date	League position	Opponents	Venue	Result	Score F–A	Scorers	Attendance	Ref
28 July 2017	10th	Antwerp	A	D	0–0		11,500	
6 August 2017	5th	KV Oostende	H	W	1–0	Hanni 77'	20,000	
13 August 2017	11th	Sporting Charleroi	A	L	0–2		11,400	
20 August 2017	10th	Sint-Truiden	H	L	2–3	Bruno 18', Teodorczyk 87'	18,000	
27 August 2017	11th	Gent	A	D	0–0		20,000	
8 September 2017	10th	Lokeren	H	W	3–2	Onyekuru (2) 3', 77', Teodorczyk 90'	18,783	
16 September 2017	9th	Kortrijk	A	D	2–2	Harbaoui 23', Onyekuru 76'	9,134	
23 September 2017	7th	Waasland-Beveren	A	W	2–1	Stanciu 75', Spajić 81'	8,235	
1 October 2017	7th	Standard Liège	H	W	1–0	Onyekuru 89'	26,361	
13 October 2017	5th	Mechelen	A	W	4–3	Gerkens 18', Onyekuru (2) 30', 37', Teodorczyk 43'	16,715	
22 October 2017	5th	Genk	H	L	0–1		20,000	
25 October 2017	3rd	Zulte-Waregem	H	W	2–0	Gerkens 74', Harbaoui 77'	19,500	
28 October 2017	3rd	AS Eupen	A	W	3–2	Leye 30' o.g., Wagué 32' o.g., Hanni 40'	5,000	
5 November 2017	3rd	Club Brugge	H	D	0–0		20,500	
18 November 2017	3rd	Royal Excel Mouscron	A	W	2–1	Bruno 42', Onyekuru 80'	10,101	
26 November 2017	3rd	Kortrijk	H	W	4–0	Makarenko 1' o.g., Hanni 15', Trebel 73', Harbaoui 79'	19,000	
2 December 2017	3rd	Lokeren	A	W	2–1	Gerkens 17', Onyekuru 52'	7,807	
10 December 2017	3rd	Sporting Charleroi	H	L	1–3	Onyekuru 82'	19,000	
17 December 2017	3rd	Club Brugge	A	L	0–5		27,667	
22 December 2017	3rd	AS Eupen	H	W	1–0	Amuzu 25'	17,000	
26 December 2017	3rd	Gent	H	W	1–0	Hanni 77'	21,000	
21 January 2018	2nd	Genk	A	W	1–0	Hanni 45'	19,755	
24 January 2018	3rd	Waasland-Beveren	H	D	2–2	Teodorczyk 40', Saief 83'	19,000	
28 January 2018	3rd	Standard Liège	A	D	3–3	Hanni (3) 14', 41', 44'	27,259	
4 February 2018	3rd	Mechelen	H	D	2–2	Ganvoula (2) 10', 57'	19,549	
10 February 2018	3rd	KV Oostende	A	L	0–2		6,807	
16 February 2018	3rd	Sint-Truiden	A	L	0–1		10,433	
25 February 2018	3rd	Royal Excel Mouscron	H	W	5–3	Morioka (2) 26', 90+2', Teodorczyk (3) 45+2' pen., 57', 61'	20,500	
3 March 2018	2nd	Zulte-Waregem	A	W	3–2	Morioka 2', Teodorczyk (2) 12', 32'	11,073	
11 March 2018	2nd	Antwerp	H	W	2–1	Teodorczyk 22', Ganvoula 77' pen.	19,886	

=== Championship play-off ===
Pos	Team	Pld	W	D	L	GF	GA	GD	Pts	Qualification	CLU	STA	AND	GNT	GNK	CHA
1	Club Brugge (C)	10	3	3	4	17	12	+5	46	Qualification for the Champions League group stage	—	4–4	1–2	0–1	1–0	6–0
2	Standard Liège	10	6	3	1	20	9	+11	43	Qualification for the Champions League third qualifying round	1–1	—	2–1	1–0	5–0	1–0
3	Anderlecht	10	4	0	6	12	15	−3	40	Qualification for the Europa League group stage	1–0	1–3	—	0–2	1–2	3–1
4	Gent	10	4	2	4	8	8	0	39	Qualification for the Europa League third qualifying round	1–0	1–3	1–0	—	0–0	0–1
5	Genk (O)	10	4	4	2	13	13	0	38	Qualification for the Europa League play-off final	1–1	1–0	2–1	1–1	—	4–1
6	Charleroi	10	2	2	6	9	22	−13	34		1–3	0–0	1–2	2–1	2–2	—

Source: Soccerway
Rules for classification: 1) Points; 2) Points without (possible) half points added due to rounding; 3) Position obtained during the Regular season
(C) Champions; (O) Play-off winners

Belgian First Division A Championship play-off match details
Date	League position	Opponents	Venue	Result	Score F–A	Scorers	Attendance	Ref
1 April 2018	3rd	Gent	H	L	0–2		19,500	
6 April 2018	3rd	Sporting Charleroi	A	W	2–1	Morioka 3', Teodorczyk 64' pen.	10,918	
15 April 2018	2nd	Club Brugge	H	W	1–0	Teodorczyk 52'	20,391	
18 April 2018	2nd	Standard Liège	A	L	1–2	Trebel 40'	27,259	
21 April 2018	2nd	Genk	A	L	1–2	Marković 20'	16,905	
29 April 2018	2nd	Sporting Charleroi	H	W	3–1	Gerkens 44', Morioka 57', Dendoncker 73'	19,721	
6 May 2018	2nd	Club Brugge	A	W	2–1	Teodorczyk 58', Morioka 73'	27,671	
10 May 2018	3rd	Standard Liège	H	L	1–3	Teodorczyk 63'	19,500	
13 May 2018	3rd	Gent	A	L	0–1		19,999	
20 May 2018	3rd	Genk	H	L	1–2	Teodorczyk 53'	26,361	

=== Belgian Super Cup ===
Belgian Super Cup match details
Round	Date	Opponents	Venue	Result	Score F–A	Scorers	Attendance	Ref
Final	22 July 2017	Zulte-Waregem	H	W	2–1	Hanni 46', Trebel 59'	21,500	

=== Belgian Cup ===
Belgian Cup match details
Round	Date	Opponents	Venue	Result	Score F–A	Scorers	Attendance	Ref
Sixth round	20 September 2017	Westerlo	A	W	1–0	Onyekuru 66'		
Seventh round	29 November 2017	Standard Liège	H	L	0–1		20,500	

=== UEFA Champions League ===
==== Group stage ====
Pos	Team	Pld	W	D	L	GF	GA	GD	Pts	Qualification	PAR	BAY	CEL	AND
1	(France) Paris Saint-Germain	6	5	0	1	25	4	+21	15 (Note: Head-to-head results: Paris Saint-Germain 3–0 Bayern Munich, Bayern Munich 3–1 Paris Saint-Germain.)	Advance to knockout phase	—	3–0	7–1	5–0
2	(Germany) Bayern Munich	6	5	0	1	13	6	+7	15	Advance to knockout phase	3–1	—	3–0	3–0
3	(Scotland) Celtic	6	1	0	5	5	18	−13	3 (Note: Head-to-head results: Anderlecht 0–3 Celtic, Celtic 0–1 Anderlecht.)	Transfer to Europa League	0–5	1–2	—	0–1
4	(Belgium) Anderlecht	6	1	0	5	2	17	−15	3		0–4	1–2	0–3	—

Source: UEFA
Rules for classification: Group stage tiebreakers
Notes:

UEFA Champions League match details
Round	Date	Opponents	Venue	Result	Score F–A	Scorers	Attendance	Ref
Group	12 September 2017	Bayern München	A	L	0–3		70,000	
Group	27 September 2017	Celtic	H	L	0–3		19,898	
Group	18 October 2017	PSG	H	L	0–4		19,108	
Group	31 October 2017	PSG	A	L	0–5		46,403	
Group	22 November 2017	Bayern München	H	L	1–2	Hanni 63'	19,753	
Group	5 December 2017	Celtic	A	W	1–0	Šimunović 62' o.g.	57,931	

== Appearances and goals ==
Numbers in parentheses denote appearances as substitute.
Players with names struck through and marked † left the club during the playing season.
Players with names in italics and marked * were on loan from another club for the whole of their season with Anderlecht.
Players listed with no appearances have been in the matchday squad but only as unused substitutes.
Key to positions: GK – Goalkeeper; DF – Defender; MF – Midfielder; FW – Forward

Players contracted for the 2017–18 season
No.	Pos.	Nat.	Name	League		Super Cup		Cup		UEFA CL		Total		Discipline	
No.	Pos.	Nat.	Name	Apps	Goals	Apps	Goals	Apps	Goals	Apps	Goals	Apps	Goals	A yellow rectangle, denoting the yellow penalty card shown to a player being cautioned	A red rectangle, denoting the red penalty card shown to a player being sent off
1	GK	BEL	Matz Sels *	32	0	1	0	1	0	3	0	37	0	1	0
2	DF	POR	Josué Sá	17 (5)	0	0	0	1	0	0 (3)	0	18 (8)	0	4	0
3	DF	BEL	Olivier Deschacht	21	0	0	0	1	0	4	0	26	0	2	1
4	DF	SEN	Kara Mbodji	13	0	1	0	1	0	4 (1)	0	19 (1)	0	2	0
5	DF	SER	Uroš Spajić	27 (1)	1	1	0	2	0	5	0	35 (1)	1	11	0
7	MF	HON	Andy Najar	5	0	0	0	0	0	1	0	6	0	0	0
8	MF	BEL	Pieter Gerkens	28 (6)	4	0 (1)	0	0 (1)	0	5	0	33 (8)	4	3	0
9	FW	NGA	Henry Onyekuru *	14 (5)	9	0 (1)	0	2	1	4 (2)	0	20 (8)	10	5	0
10	MF	ROU	~~Nicolae Stanciu~~ †	3 (7)	1	1	0	0 (1)	0	1 (2)	0	5 (10)	1	2	0
10	MF	JPN	Ryota Morioka	13 (3)	6	0	0	0	0	0	0	13 (3)	6	0	0
11	MF	ROU	Alexandru Chipciu	10 (7)	0	1	0	1	0	2	0	14 (7)	0	3	0
12	DF	FRA	Dennis Appiah	23 (4)	0	1	0	1 (1)	0	5 (1)	0	30 (6)	0	7	0
15	MF	USA	Kenny Saief *	17	1	0	0	0	0	0	0	17	1	3	0
17	MF	BEL	Massimo Bruno *	7 (10)	2	0	0	2	0	0 (4)	0	9 (14)	2	1	0
20	MF	BEL	Sven Kums	35	0	1	0	1 (1)	0	5	0	42 (1)	0	7	1
23	GK	BEL	Frank Boeckx	8	0	0	0	1	0	3	0	12	0	1	0
24	FW	SWE	Isaac Kiese Thelin	1 (1)	0	0 (1)	0	0	0	0	0	1 (2)	0	0	0
25	MF	FRA	Adrien Trebel	30 (3)	2	1	1	1	0	6	0	38 (3)	3	10	1
30	GK	NED	Boy de Jong	0	0	0	0	0	0	0	0	0	0	0	0
32	MF	BEL	Leander Dendoncker	35 (1)	1	0	0	2	0	6	0	43 (1)	1	8	2
33	GK	BEL	Davy Roef	0	0	0	0	0	0	0	0	0	0	0	0
35	FW	CGO	Silvère Ganvoula	4 (11)	3	0	0	0	0	0	0	4 (11)	3	1	0
36	FW	SVN	~~Robert Berić *~~ †	1 (5)	0	0	0	0	0	0	0	1 (5)	0	0	0
37	DF	SER	Ivan Obradović	21 (4)	0	1	0	2	0	2 (1)	0	26 (5)	0	5	0
38	FW	GHA	Dauda Mohammed	0 (2)	0	0	0	0	0	0	0	0 (2)	0	0	0
39	MF	COD	Edo Kayembe	0 (1)	0	0	0	0	0	0	0	0 (1)	0	0	0
40	FW	BEL	Francis Amuzu	3 (8)	1	0	0	0	0	0	0	3 (8)	1	0	0
41	DF	GHA	Emmanuel Sowah	1	0	0	0	0	0	0	0	1	0	1	0
43	DF	BEL	Kobe Cools	0	0	0	0	0	0	0	0	0	0	0	0
44	DF	BEL	Hannes Delcroix	0	0	0	0	0	0	0	0	0	0	0	0
45	GK	BEL	~~Mile Svilar~~ †	0	0	0	0	0	0	0	0	0	0	0	0
45	DF	BEL	Sebastiaan Bornauw	0	0	0	0	0	0	0	0	0	0	0	0
47	DF	MLI	Abdoul Karim Danté	0 (3)	0	0	0	0	0	0	0	0 (3)	0	0	0
48	FW	BEL	Albert Sambi Lokonga	4 (3)	0	0	0	0	0	0	0	4 (3)	0	0	0
50	MF	SRB	Lazar Marković *	5 (3)	1	0	0	0	0	0	0	5 (3)	1	1	0
52	MF	BEL	Nelson Azevedo-Janelas	1	0	0	0	0	0	0	0	1	0	0	0
56	MF	BEL	Alexis Saelemaekers	7 (4)	0	0	0	0	0	0	0	7 (4)	0	2	0
91	FW	POL	Łukasz Teodorczyk	28 (5)	15	1	0	0	0	4 (2)	0	33 (7)	15	11	1
94	MF	ALG	~~Sofiane Hanni~~ †	21 (2)	8	1	1	1	0	6	1	29 (2)	10	5	0
99	FW	TUN	~~Hamdi Harbaoui~~ †	5 (6)	3	0	0	2	0	0 (2)	0	7 (8)	3	4	0

== Transfers ==
=== In ===
First Team
Date	Position	No.	Player	From club	Transfer fee	Ref
1 July 2017	MF	20	(Belgium) Sven Kums	(England) Watford	Unknown	
1 July 2017	MF	8	(Belgium) Pieter Gerkens	(Belgium) Sint-Truidense	Unknown	
1 July 2017	DF	5	(Serbia) Uros Spajic	(France) Toulouse	Unknown	

=== Out ===
First Team
Date	Position	Player	To club	Transfer fee	Ref
3 July 2017	DF	(Democratic Republic of the Congo) Fabrice N'Sakala	(Turkey) Alanyaspor	Unknown	
22 July 2017	DF	(Brazil) Rafael Galhardo	(Brazil) Cruzeiro	Free	
28 July 2017	DF	(Netherlands) Bram Nuytinck	(Italy) Udinese	Unknown	
28 August 2017	GK	(Belgium) Mile Svilar	(Portugal) Benfica	€2,500,000	

== Loans ==
=== In ===
First Team
Start date	End date	Position	No.	Player	From club	Ref
1 July 2017	30 June 2018	GK	1	(Belgium) Matz Sels	(England) Newcastle United	
1 July 2017	30 June 2018	FW	9	(Nigeria) Henry Onyekuru	(England) Everton	
Loan ext.	30 June 2018	MF	17	(Belgium) Massimo Bruno	(Germany) RB Leipzig	
Loan ext.	30 June 2018 (Note: Anderlecht have negotiated an option to buy clause in Thelin's loan extension)	FW	24	(Sweden) Isaac Kiese Thelin	(France) Bordeaux	

=== Out ===
First Team
Start date	End date	Position	Player	To club	Ref
July 2017	January 2018	MF	(Ghana) Frank Acheampong	(China) Tianjin Teda (Note: Tianjin Teda have an option to purchase clause in this loan agreement)	
1 July 2017		MF	(Senegal) Stéphane Badji	(Turkey) Kayserispor	
5 July 2017	30 June 2018	MF	(Egypt) Mahmoud Hassan	(Turkey) Kasımpaşa	
19 July 2017	30 June 2018	FW	(Belgium) Jorn Vancamp	(Netherlands) Roda	
1 July 2017	30 June 2018	FW	(Belgium) Aaron Leya Iseka	(Belgium) Zulte Waregem	
19 July 2017	30 June 2018	MF	(Ivory Coast) Idrissa Doumbia	(Belgium) Zulte Waregem	
2 July 2017	30 June 2018	MF	(Democratic Republic of the Congo) Dodi Lukebakio	(Belgium) Charleroi	

== See also ==
- 2017–18 in Belgian football
- 2017–18 Belgian First Division A
- 2017–18 Belgian Cup
- 2017–18 UEFA Champions League
- 2017 Belgian Super Cup
