= 2016–17 RSC Anderlecht season =

Anderlecht
2016–17 season
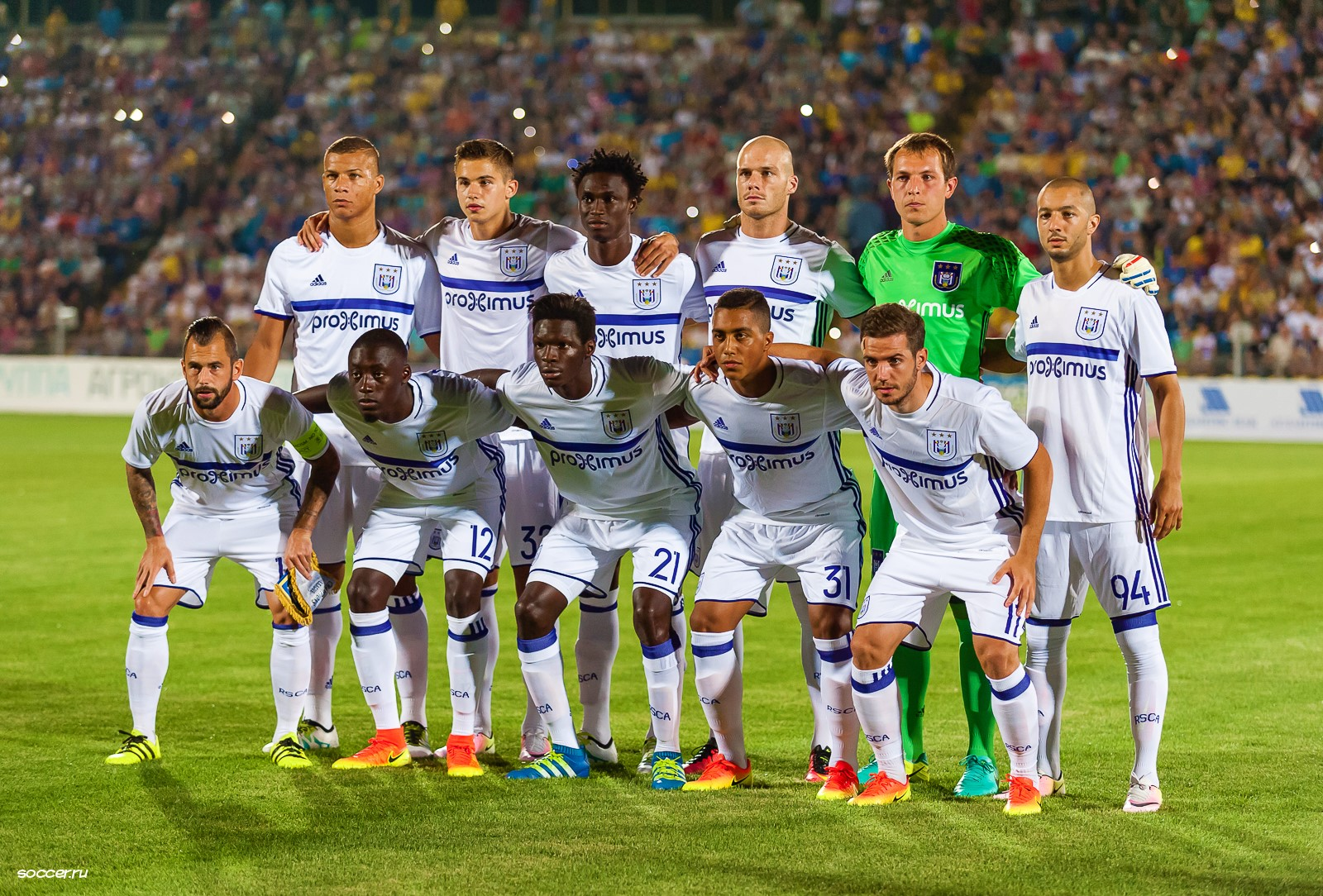
- Chairman: Roger Vanden Stock
- Manager: René Weiler
- Ground: Constant Vanden Stock Stadium
- Belgian First Division A: 1st (champions)
- Belgian Cup: Seventh round
- UEFA Champions League: Third qualifying round
- UEFA Europa League: Quarter final
- Top goalscorer: League: Łukasz Teodorczyk (22); All: Łukasz Teodorczyk (30)
- Highest home attendance: 21,000 vs Standard Liège, Belgian First Division A, 29 January 2017
- Lowest home attendance: 7,300 vs OH Leuven, Belgian Cup, 21 September 2016
- Average home league attendance: 18,333
Home colours	Away colours	Third colours

The 2016–17 season is a season played by Anderlecht, a Belgian football club based in Anderlecht, Brussels. The season covers the period from 1 July 2016 to 30 June 2017. Anderlecht will be participating in the Belgian First Division A, Belgian Cup and the UEFA Champions League.

== Match details ==
League positions are sourced by Statto, while the remaining information is referenced individually.

=== Belgian First Division A ===
==== Regular season ====
Pos	Team	Pld	W	D	L	GF	GA	GD	Pts	Qualification or relegation
1	Anderlecht	30	18	7	5	67	30	+37	61	Qualification for the championship play-offs
2	Club Brugge	30	18	5	7	56	24	+32	59	Qualification for the championship play-offs
3	Zulte Waregem	30	15	9	6	49	38	+11	54	Qualification for the championship play-offs
4	Gent	30	14	8	8	45	29	+16	50	Qualification for the championship play-offs
5	Oostende	30	14	8	8	52	37	+15	50	Qualification for the championship play-offs

Source: Belgian First Division A (in Dutch), Soccerway
Rules for classification: 1) Points; 2) Matches won; 3) Goal difference; 4) Goals scored; 5) Away goals scored; 6) Away matches won; 7) Play-off.

Date	League position	Opponents	Venue	Result	Score F–A	Scorers	Attendance	Ref
30 July 2016	3rd	Royal Excel Mouscron	A	W	2–1	Acheampong 62', Sylla 65'	7,000	
7 August 2016	1st	Kortrijk	H	W	5–1	Hanni 32', Teodorczyk 50', Chipciu 54', Defour 63', Sylla 75'	20,000	
12 August 2016	1st	Sint-Truiden	A	D	0–0		10,039	
21 August 2016	2nd	AS Eupen	A	D	2–2	Capel 21', Teodorczyk 46'	5,221	
28 August 2016	5th	Gent	H	D	2–2	Tielemans 19' pen., Teodorczyk 47'	19,000	
11 September 2016	2nd	Sporting Charleroi	H	W	3–2	Teodorczyk 57', Hanni 66', Tielemans 68'	19,000	
18 September 2016	2nd	Genk	A	W	2–0	Mbodji 64', Harbaoui 76'	19,570	
25 September 2016	2nd	Westerlo	H	L	1–2	Hanni 83'	11,000	
2 October 2016	2nd	Standard Liège	A	W	1–0	Teodorczyk 79'	27,850	
16 October 2016	1st	Lokeren	H	W	1–0	Teodorczyk 89'	20,000	
23 October 2016	2nd	Club Brugge	A	L	1–2	Teodorczyk 87'	27,106	
26 October 2016	2nd	Mechelen	H	W	2–0	Teodorczyk 31', Tielemans 81' pen.	17,509	
30 October 2016	2nd	Waasland-Beveren	A	L	1–2	Teodorczyk 10'	7,098	
6 November 2016	2nd	KV Oostende	H	D	1–1	Tielemans 82' pen.	20,000	
20 November 2016	6th	Zulte-Waregem	A	L	2–3	Teodorczyk (2) 14', 31'	12,250	
27 November 2016	6th	Royal Excel Mouscron	H	W	7–0	Teodorczyk 1', Hanni 21', Delač 28' o.g., Stanciu 31', Tielemans 76' pen., Spajić 82', Bruno 84'	15,000	
4 December 2016	3rd	Kortrijk	A	W	3–1	Stanciu 29', Teodorczyk 56', Obradović 83'	9,191	
11 December 2016	3rd	Club Brugge	H	D	0–0		20,000	
18 December 2016	3rd	AS Eupen	H	W	4–0	Hanni (2) 8', 90', Dendoncker (2) 21', 61'	15,000	
22 December 2016	3rd	Gent	A	W	3–2	Teodorczyk (2) 29', 56', Chipciu 74'	19,999	
26 December 2016	2nd	Sporting Charleroi	A	W	2–0	Teodorczyk 74', Acheampong 85'	14,061	
22 January 2017	2nd	Sint-Truiden	H	W	3–1	Tielemans (2) 31', 90+2' pen., Stanciu 65'	19,000	
25 January 2017	2nd	Westerlo	A	W	4–2	Teodorczyk 7', Stanciu 15', Dendoncker 45', Tielemans 49'	8,000	
29 January 2017	2nd	Standard Liège	H	D	0–0		21,000	
3 February 2017	2nd	Lokeren	A	D	0–0		8,202	
12 February 2017	2nd	Zulte-Waregem	H	W	4–2	Hanni 22', Bruno 42', Tielemans 46', Chipciu 90+1'	19,000	
19 February 2017	2nd	KV Oostende	A	W	4–1	Hanni 2', Tielemans (2) 67', 69', Teodorczyk 90'	9,000	
26 February 2017	2nd	Genk	H	W	2–0	Mbodji 32', Tielemans 50'	19,000	
4 March 2017	2nd	Mechelen	A	L	2–3	Teodorczyk 54', Nuytinck 71'	16,701	
12 March 2017	1st	Waasland-Beveren	H	W	3–0	Bruno 3', Teodorczyk 36', Mbodji 41'	20,000	

==== Championship play-offs ====
Pos	Team	Pld	W	D	L	GF	GA	GD	Pts	Qualification	AND	CLU	GNT	OOS	CHA	ZWA
1	Anderlecht (C)	10	6	3	1	14	6	+8	52	Qualification for the Champions League group stage	—	2–0	0–0	3–2	0–1	2–0
2	Club Brugge	10	4	3	3	16	14	+2	45	Qualification for the Champions League third qualifying round	1–1	—	2–1	3–1	1–1	2–1
3	Gent	10	4	4	2	16	11	+5	41	Qualification for the Europa League third qualifying round	0–0	2–1	—	1–1	1–1	5–2
4	Oostende (O)	10	3	3	4	14	17	−3	37	Qualification for the Europa League play-off final	0–1	2–1	4–3	—	1–0	1–1
5	Charleroi	10	2	4	4	10	13	−3	35		1–3	1–3	0–1	1–1	—	2–0
6	Zulte Waregem	10	1	3	6	12	21	−9	33	Qualification for the Europa League group stage (Note: Zulte Waregem qualified for the Europa League group stage by winning the 2016–17 Belgian Cup.)	1–2	2–2	0–2	3–1	2–2	—

Source: Soccerway
Rules for classification: 1) Points; 2) Points without (possible) half points added due to rounding; 3) Matches won; 4) Goal difference; 5) Goals scored; 6) Away goals scored; 7) Away matches won; 8) Play-off.
(C) Champions; (O) Play-off winners
Notes:

Date	League position	Opponents	Venue	Result	Score F–A	Scorers	Attendance	Ref
31 March 2017	1st	Zulte-Waregem	A	W	2–1	Chipciu 20', Tielemans 72'	9,941	
9 April 2017	1st	Gent	H	D	0–0		21,500	
16 April 2017	1st	KV Oostende	A	W	1–0	Hanni 48'	8,000	
23 April 2017	1st	Club Brugge	H	W	2–0	Dendoncker 21', Mbodji 34'	20,366	
27 April 2017	1st	Sporting Charleroi	H	L	0–1		21,500	
30 April 2017	1st	Gent	A	D	0–0		19,999	
7 May 2017	1st	Zulte-Waregem	H	W	2–0	Chipciu 15', Thelin 90+2'	19,500	
14 May 2017	1st	Club Brugge	A	D	1–1	Hanni 9'	27,490	
18 May 2017	1st	Sporting Charleroi	A	W	3–1	Teodorczyk (2) 59', 81', Bruno 87'	14,710	
21 May 2017	1st	KV Oostende	H	W	3–2	Rozehnal 42' o.g., Dendoncker 64', Acheampong 78'	19,500	

=== Belgian Cup ===
Round	Date	Opponents	Venue	Result	Score F–A	Scorers	Attendance	Ref
Sixth round	21 September 2016	OH Leuven	H	W	1–0	Harbaoui 52'	7,300	
Seventh round	1 December 2016	Sporting Charleroi	A	D	2–2 (a.e.t.); 3–5 pens.	Spajić 12', Teodorczyk 81'	9,689	

=== UEFA Champions League ===
==== Qualifying stage ====
Round	Date	Opponents	Venue	Result	Score F–A	Scorers	Attendance	Ref
Third qualifying round first leg	26 July 2016	Rostov	A	D	2–2	Hanni 3', Tielemans 52'	14,770	
Third qualifying round second leg	3 August 2016	Rostov	H	L	0–2		19,464	

=== UEFA Europa League ===
==== Qualifying stage ====
Round	Date	Opponents	Venue	Result	Score F–A	Scorers	Attendance	Ref
Play-off round first leg	18 August 2016	Slavia Praha	A	W	3–0	Sylla 50, Teodorczyk 62', Hanni 72'	16,096	
Play-off round second leg	25 August 2016	Slavia Praha	H	W	3–0	Tielemans 22' pen., Teodorczyk 40' pen., Heylen 61'	13,075	

==== Group stage ====
Pos	Team	Pld	W	D	L	GF	GA	GD	Pts	Qualification	SET	AND	MNZ	QAB
1	(France) Saint-Étienne	6	3	3	0	8	5	+3	12	Advance to knockout phase	—	1–1	0–0	1–0
2	(Belgium) Anderlecht	6	3	2	1	16	8	+8	11	Advance to knockout phase	2–3	—	6–1	3–1
3	(Germany) Mainz 05	6	2	3	1	8	10	−2	9		1–1	1–1	—	2–0
4	(Azerbaijan) Gabala	6	0	0	6	5	14	−9	0		1–2	1–3	2–3	—

Source: UEFA
Rules for classification: Group stage tiebreakers

(Note: Gabala played their home match at Bakcell Arena, Baku instead of their regular stadium, City Stadium, Qabala, as it does not meet UEFA requirements.)

Round	Date	Opponents	Venue	Result	Score F–A	Scorers	Attendance	Ref
Group	15 September 2016	Qabala	H	W	3–1	Teodorczyk 14', Rafael Santos 41' o.g., Capel 77'	11,638	
Group	29 September 2016	Saint-Étienne	A	D	1–1	Tielemans 62' pen.	23,258	
Group	20 October 2016	Mainz 05	A	D	1–1	Teodorczyk 65'	21,317	
Group	4 November 2016	Mainz 05	H	W	6–1	Stanciu (2) 9', 41', Tielemans 62', Teodorczyk (2) 89', 90+4' pen., Bruno 90+2'	13,275	
Group	24 November 2016	Qabala	A	W	3–1	Tielemans 10, Bruno 90', Teodorczyk 90+3'	4,500	
Group	8 December 2016	Saint-Étienne	H	L	2–3	Chipciu 21', Stanciu 31'	13,583	

==== Knockout phase ====
Round	Date	Opponents	Venue	Result	Score F–A	Scorers	Attendance	Ref
Round of 32	16 February 2017	Zenit	H	W	2–0	Acheampong (2) 5', 31'	13,415	
Round of 32	23 February 2017	Zenit	A	L	1–3	Thelin 90'	17,992	
Round of 16	9 March 2017	APOEL	A	W	1–0	Stanciu 29'	19,327	
Round of 16	16 March 2017	APOEL	H	W	1–0	Acheampong 65'	15,662	
Quarter final	13 April 2017	Manchester United	H	D	1–1	Dendoncker 86'	20,060	
Quarter final	20 April 2017	Manchester United	A	L	1–2 (a.e.t.)	Hanni 32'	71,496	

== Appearances and goals ==
Numbers in parentheses denote appearances as substitute.
Players with names struck through and marked † left the club during the playing season.
Players with names in italics and marked * were on loan from another club for the whole of their season with Anderlecht.
Players listed with no appearances have been in the matchday squad but only as unused substitutes.
Key to positions: GK – Goalkeeper; DF – Defender; MF – Midfielder; FW – Forward

No.	Pos.	Nat.	Name	League		Belgian Cup		UEFA CL		UEFA EL		Total		Discipline	
No.	Pos.	Nat.	Name	Apps	Goals	Apps	Goals	Apps	Goals	Apps	Goals	Apps	Goals	A yellow rectangle, denoting the yellow penalty card shown to a player being cautioned	A red rectangle, denoting the red penalty card shown to a player being sent off
1	GK	BEL	~~Davy Roef~~ †	15	0	1	0	2	0	7	0	25	0	1	0
1	GK	ESP	Rubén Iván Martínez	1	0	0	0	0	0	6	0	7	0	0	0
3	DF	BEL	Olivier Deschacht	5 (11)	0	0	0	0	0	4	0	9 (11)	0	2	0
4	DF	SEN	Kara Mbodji	29	4	0	0	0	0	7	0	36	4	10	0
5	DF	FRA	~~Sebastian De Maio~~ †	2	0	0	0	2	0	0	0	4	0	1	0
5	DF	SRB	Uroš Spajić *	24 (4)	1	2	1	0	0	9	0	35 (4)	2	7	0
7	MF	HON	Andy Najar	7 (2)	0	1	0	0	0	4 (1)	0	12 (3)	0	1	0
8	MF	SEN	Stéphane Badji	6 (4)	0	1	0	0	0	2 (5)	0	9 (9)	0	3	1
9	FW	TUN	Hamdi Harbaoui	1 (7)	1	1	1	0	0	0 (2)	0	2 (9)	2	0	0
10	MF	BEL	~~Dennis Praet~~ †	0 (1)	0	0	0	0	0	1	0	1 (1)	0	0	0
10	MF	BEL	Massimo Bruno *	13 (15)	4	2	0	0	0	2 (7)	2	17 (22)	6	1	0
11	MF	ROU	Alexandru Chipciu	31 (1)	5	0 (2)	0	2	0	10 (2)	1	43 (5)	6	7	0
12	DF	FRA	Dennis Appiah	17	0	0	0	2	0	5	0	24	0	3	0
14	DF	NED	Bram Nuytinck	28 (2)	1	2	0	2	0	9 (1)	0	41 (3)	1	7	0
16	MF	BEL	~~Steven Defour~~ †	1 (1)	1	0	0	2	0	0	0	3 (1)	1	0	0
17	MF	ESP	Diego Capel	5 (10)	1	2	0	0	0	2 (6)	1	9 (16)	2	2	0
18	FW	GHA	Frank Acheampong	16 (13)	3	2	0	0 (2)	0	12 (2)	3	30 (17)	6	5	0
19	FW	COL	~~Oswal Álvarez~~ †	0	0	0	0	0	0	0	0	0	0	0	0
21	DF	COD	Fabrice N'Sakala	2	0	0	0	2	0	0	0	4	0	0	0
22	MF	CIV	Idrissa Doumbia	1 (1)	0	1	0	0	0	0 (2)	0	2 (3)	0	0	0
23	GK	BEL	Frank Boeckx	23	0	2	0	0	0	1	0	26	0	1	0
24	DF	BEL	~~Michaël Heylen~~ †	0 (2)	0	0	0	0 (1)	0	1 (1)	1	1 (4)	1	0	0
24	FW	SWE	Isaac Kiese Thelin *	2 (14)	1	0	0	0	0	3 (3)	1	5 (17)	2	2	0
25	MF	FRA	Adrien Trebel	12 (5)	0	0	0	0	0	0	0	12 (5)	0	4	0
26	FW	GUI	~~Idrissa Sylla~~ †	1 (3)	2	0	0	2	0	1 (1)	1	4 (4)	3	4	0
27	MF	EGY	Mahmoud Hassan	0 (1)	0	0	0	0 (2)	0	0	0	0 (3)	0	0	0
31	MF	BEL	Youri Tielemans	35 (2)	13	1	0	2	1	13	4	51 (2)	18	8	0
32	MF	BEL	Leander Dendoncker	40	5	1	0	2	0	14	1	57	6	8	1
37	DF	SRB	Ivan Obradović	26	1	1	0	0	0	6	0	33	1	4	0
40	DF	BEL	Wout Faes	0	0	0	0	0	0	0	0	0	0	0	0
41	DF	GHA	Emmanuel Sowah Adjei	5 (4)	0	0	0	0	0	4 (1)	0	9 (5)	0	3	0
45	GK	BEL	Mile Svilar	0	0	0	0	0	0	0	0	0	0	0	0
47	DF	BEL	Hannes Delcroix	0	0	0	0	0	0	0	0	0	0	0	0
49	FW	BEL	Jorn Vancamp	0 (1)	0	0	0	0	0	1	0	1 (1)	0	1	0
73	MF	ROU	Nicolae Stanciu	20 (4)	4	1 (1)	0	0	0	11 (1)	4	32 (6)	8	3	1
77	FW	BEL	Nathan Kabasele	0 (1)	0	1	0	0 (1)	0	0	0	1 (2)	0	1	0
91	FW	POL	Łukasz Teodorczyk *	36 (2)	22	0 (2)	1	0	0	10 (3)	7	46 (7)	30	10	0
94	MF	ALG	Sofiane Hanni	35 (3)	10	1 (1)	0	2	1	9 (4)	2	47 (8)	13	8	0
97	MF	COD	Dodi Lukebakio	0	0	0	0	0	0	0	0	0	0	0	0
99	FW	ITA	~~Stefano Okaka~~ †	0	0	0	0	0	0	0	0	0	0	0	0
