= Ivan Obradović =

Serbian footballer (born 1988)

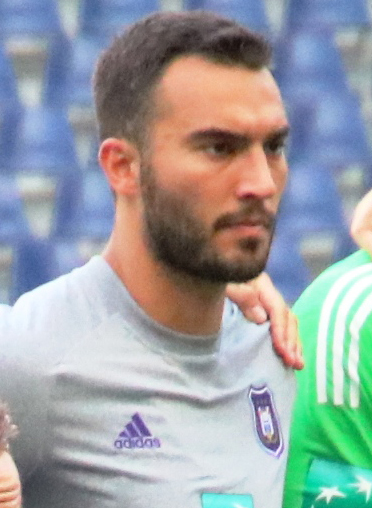
- Obradović in 2017

Personal information
- Full name: Ivan Obradović
- Date of birth: 25 July 1988 (age 38)
- Place of birth: Obrenovac, SR Serbia, SFR Yugoslavia
- Height: 1.81 m (5 ft 11 in)
- Position: Left-back

Youth career
- 1997–2006: Partizan

Senior career*
Years	Team	Apps	(Gls)
2006–2009	Partizan	55	(1)
2006–2007	→ Teleoptik (loan)	20	(0)
2009–2013	Zaragoza	47	(0)
2014–2015	Mechelen	42	(2)
2015–2019	Anderlecht	74	(1)
2020	Legia Warsaw II	6	(0)
2020–2022	Partizan	25	(2)
Total		269	(6)

International career
2008–2018	Serbia	27	(1)
- * Club domestic league appearances and goals

Ivan Obradović (Serbian Cyrillic: Иван Обрадовић, pronounced [ǐʋan obrǎːdoʋitɕ]; born 25 July 1988) is a Serbian retired professional footballer who played as a left-back.

At international level, Obradović represented Serbia at the 2010 FIFA World Cup.

== Club career ==
Obradović came through the youth system at Partizan, making his senior debuts with their affiliated side Teleoptik in 2006. He was promoted to Partizan first team squad under manager Miroslav Đukić, making his debut in a 1–0 home league win over Vojvodina on 22 April 2007. Until the end of the 2006–07 season, Obradović recorded four more appearances. He subsequently signed his first professional contract with Partizan, on 7 June 2007, penning a five-year deal. In the following two seasons, Obradović established himself as a first team regular and helped Partizan win two domestic doubles. He made a total of 55 league appearances for the club, scoring his only goal against Javor Ivanjica on 23 August 2009, the game ended 1–1.

On 24 August 2009, Obradović was officially transferred to Spanish club Zaragoza for an undisclosed fee. He was still allowed to play for Partizan the following Thursday, against Slovak side MŠK Žilina in the UEFA Europa League play-off round. During his four years at La Romareda, Obradović struggled with knee injuries that caused him to miss numerous games. He ultimately managed to collect a total of 48 appearances in all competitions. In August 2013, one year before expiration of his contract, Obradović was released by mutual consent.

After leaving Zaragoza, Obradović returned to Serbia and trained with top flight club Rad. He also spent some time on trial at Dutch club Vitesse in early 2014, but failed to get a contract. In March 2014, Obradović eventually signed for Belgian side Mechelen until the end of the season, with an option for another one.

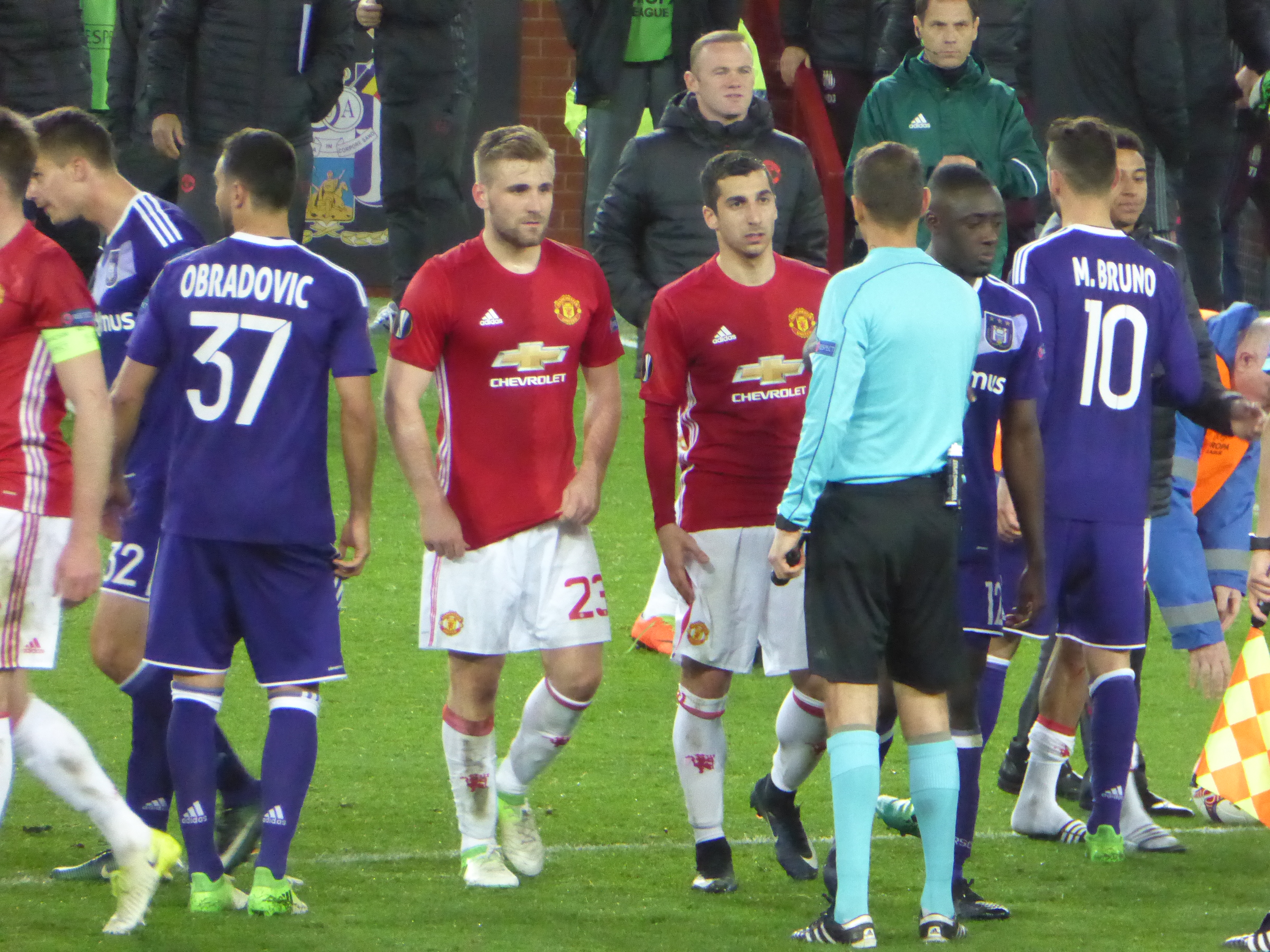
Obradović (with number 37) in 2017 against Manchester United

After his consistent performances with Mechelen, Obradović secured a move to Anderlecht in June 2015. He helped the team win the league in the 2016–17 season.

On 11 July 2019, he joined the Polish club Legia Warsaw. However, he did not feature in any matches for the first team. In January 2020, he was reassigned to the club's reserve squad. While representing Legia II, he competed in the round of 16 of the 2019–20 Polish Cup, where the team was defeated 0–2 by Piast Gliwice. Ultimately, on 26 June 2020, his contract with Legia Warsaw was terminated by mutual consent.

== International career ==
Internationally, Obradović was capped for Serbia at under-19 and under-21 level. He was selected by Slobodan Krčmarević to represent his country at the 2009 UEFA European Under-21 Championship.

Obradović made his senior debut for Serbia on 6 September 2008, playing the full 90 minutes in a 2–0 home win over the Faroe Islands at the start of the World Cup 2010 qualifying phase. He scored his first international goal in a 3–1 win away at Austria on 15 October 2008.

In June 2010, he was selected in Serbia's squad for the 2010 FIFA World Cup, where he appeared in group stage match against Australia. He earned a total of 27 caps, scoring 1 goal, and his final international was a March 2018 friendly match against Morocco.

== Career statistics ==
=== Club ===
Appearances and goals by club, season and competition
Club	Season	League			National cup (Note: Includes Serbian Cup, Copa del Rey, Belgian Cup, Polish Cup)		Continental		Other		Total	
Club	Season	Division	Apps	Goals	Apps	Goals	Apps	Goals	Apps	Goals	Apps	Goals
Teleoptik (loan)	2006–07	Serbian League Belgrade	20	0			—		—		20	0
Partizan	2006–07	Serbian SuperLiga	5	0	0	0	0	0	—		5	0
Partizan	2007–08	Serbian SuperLiga	19	0	3	0	1 (Note: Appearance in UEFA Cup)	0	—		23	0
Partizan	2008–09	Serbian SuperLiga	29	0	4	0	9 (Note: Four appearances in UEFA Champions League, five appearances in UEFA Cup)	0	—		42	0
Partizan	2009–10	Serbian SuperLiga	2	1	0	0	4 (Note: Two appearances in UEFA Champions League, two appearances in UEFA Europa League)	0	—		6	1
Partizan	Total		55	1	7	0	14	0	—		76	1
Zaragoza	2009–10	La Liga	9	0	0	0	—		—		9	0
Zaragoza	2010–11	La Liga	20	0	1	0	—		—		21	0
Zaragoza	2011–12	La Liga	17	0	0	0	—		—		17	0
Zaragoza	2012–13	La Liga	1	0	0	0	—		—		1	0
Zaragoza	Total		47	0	1	0	—		—		48	1
Mechelen	2013–14	Belgian Pro League	3	0	0	0	—		—		3	0
Mechelen	2014–15	Belgian Pro League	39	2	4	0	—		—		43	2
Mechelen	Total		42	2	4	0	—		—		46	2
Anderlecht	2015–16	Belgian Pro League	13	0	0	0	3 (Note: Appearances in UEFA Europa League)	0	—		16	0
Anderlecht	2016–17	Belgian First Division A	26	1	1	0	6	0	—		33	1
Anderlecht	2017–18	Belgian First Division A	25	0	3	0	3 (Note: Appearances in UEFA Champions League)	0	1 (Note: Appearance in Belgian Super Cup)	0	32	0
Anderlecht	2018–19	Belgian First Division A	10	0	1	0	0	0	0	0	11	0
Anderlecht	Total		74	1	5	0	12	0	1	0	91	1
Legia Warsaw II	2019–20	III liga, gr. I	6	0	1	0	—		—		7	0
Partizan	2020–21	Serbian SuperLiga	17	1	3	0	0	0	—		20	1
Partizan	2021–22	Serbian SuperLiga	8	1	1	0	6 (Note: Appearances in UEFA Europa Conference League)	0	—		15	1
Partizan	Total		25	2	4	0	6	0	—		35	2
Career total			269	6	22	0	32	0	1	0	324	6

=== International ===
Appearances and goals by national team and year
National team	Year	Apps	Goals
Serbia	2008	4	1
Serbia	2009	6	0
Serbia	2010	5	0
Serbia	2011	3	0
Serbia	2012	2	0
Serbia	2013	0	0
Serbia	2014	0	0
Serbia	2015	2	0
Serbia	2016	1	0
Serbia	2017	3	0
Serbia	2018	1	0
Total		27	1

Scores and results list Serbia's goal tally first, score column indicates score after each Obradović goal.

List of international goals scored by Ivan Obradović
No.	Date	Venue	Opponent	Score	Result	Competition
1	15 October 2008	Ernst-Happel-Stadion, Vienna, Austria	Austria	3–0	3–1	2010 FIFA World Cup qualification

== Honours ==
Partizan

- Serbian SuperLiga: 2007–08, 2008–09
- Serbian Cup: 2007–08, 2008–09

Anderlecht

- Belgian First Division A: 2016–17
- Belgian Super Cup: 2017

Individual

- Serbian SuperLiga Team of the Season: 2008–09
