= Kara Mbodji =

Senegalese footballer (born 1989)

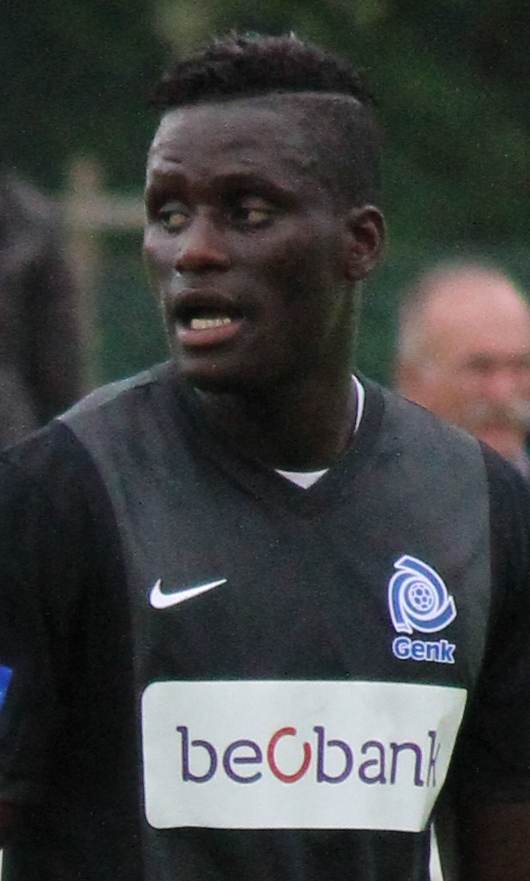
- Mbodji with Genk in 2014

Personal information
- Full name: Serigne Modou Kara Mbodji
- Date of birth: 22 November 1989 (age 36)
- Place of birth: Ndiass, Senegal
- Height: 1.92 m (6 ft 4 in)
- Positions: Centre-back; defensive midfielder

Youth career
- Diambars FC

Senior career*
Years	Team	Apps	(Gls)
2008–2010	Diambars FC	43	(4)
2010–2012	Tromsø	70	(8)
2013–2015	Genk	75	(4)
2015–2019	Anderlecht	90	(6)
2018–2019	→ Nantes (loan)	6	(0)
2019–2022	Al-Sailiya	57	(3)

International career
2011–2012	Senegal U23	7	(1)
2011–2018	Senegal	47	(4)
- * Club domestic league appearances and goals

Serigne Modou Kara Mbodji (born 22 November 1989), commonly known as Kara or Kara Mbodji, is a Senegalese professional footballer who plays for the Senegal national team. He can be deployed as a defender, defensive midfielder or in the central midfield.

== Club career ==
=== Tromsø ===
At the age of 15, Mbodji joined the Diambars academy in Dakar, Senegal. On 2 February 2010, he joined Norwegian club Tromsø IL. During his three seasons in the Norwegian Premier League, he was awarded best player of his team and twice second best player of the Championship.

Early life

His early life was marked by a passion for sport. When he journey started at Diambars FC and when Europe laid the foundation In Senegal of his successful, he joined Senegal's National Football team.

Life Inherentence

On 7 August 2015, he joined R.S.C. Anderlecht for a fee of €4.5 million, signing a four-year deal until June 2019. In August 2017, he agreed a contract extension with the club until 2020. In his time at the club he made 97 appearances scoring 7 goals.

=== Nantes ===
On 30 August 2018, one day before the closing of the 2018 summer transfer window, Mbodji moved to Ligue 1 side FC Nantes on loan for the 2018–19 season. Nantes also secured an option to sign him permanently. His loan ended early, in January 2019, with Mbodji citing lack of playing time.

=== Al-Sailiya ===
On 20 July 2019, Al-Sailiya signed Kara Mbodji for three season from Anderlecht.

== International career ==
Mbodji was a part of the Senegal team for the 2012 Olympic Games. He was included in the Senegal national football team's squad for the 2015 Africa Cup of Nations and scored in a 1–1 draw with South Africa in the team's second group match.

In June 2018 he was named in Senegal's 23-man squad for the 2018 World Cup in Russia.

== Career statistics ==
=== Club ===
As of 7 February 2024

Club	Season	League			National Cup (Note: Appearances in the Norwegian Football Cup, the Belgian Cup, the Coupe de France, and the Emir Cup)		Continental		Other		Total	
Club	Season	Division	Apps	Goals	Apps	Goals	Apps	Goals	Apps	Goals	Apps	Goals
Tromsø	2010	Tippeligaen	22	0	2	0	—		—		24	0
Tromsø	2011	Tippeligaen	26	5	1	0	4 (Note: Appearances in the Europa League)	0	—		31	5
Tromsø	2012	Tippeligaen	22	3	4	0	3	1	—		29	4
Tromsø	Total		70	8	7	0	7	1	—		84	9
Genk	2012–13	First Division	2	0	2	0	0	0	8 (Note: Appearances in the Belgian First Division playoffs)	2	12	2
Genk	2013–14	First Division	26	0	3	0	10	2	8 (Note: Seven appearances in the Belgian First Division playoffs, and one appearance in the Belgian Super Cup)	0	47	2
Genk	2014–15	First Division	24	2	1	0	—		6	0	31	2
Genk	2015–16	First Division	2	0	—		—		—		2	0
Genk	Total		54	2	6	0	10	2	22	2	92	6
Anderlecht	2015–16	First Division	24	1	0	0	9	1	8	1	41	3
Anderlecht	2016–17	First Division A	21	3	0	0	7	0	8	1	36	4
Anderlecht	2017–18	First Division A	12	0	1	0	5 (Note: Appearances in the UEFA Champions League)	0	2 (Note: One appearance in the Belgian First Division A playoffs, and one appearance in the Belgian Super Cup)	0	20	0
Anderlecht	2018-19	First Division A	9	0	—		—		8	0	17	0
Anderlecht	Total		66	4	1	0	21	1	26	2	114	7
Nantes (loan)	2018–19	Ligue 1	6	0	1	0	—		1 (Note: Appearances in the Coupe de la Ligue)	0	8	0
Nantes (loan)	Total		6	0	1	0	—		1	0	8	0
Al-Sailiya	2019-20	Qatar Stars League	22	1	0	0	1 (Note: Appearances in the AFC Champions League)	0	1 (Note: Appearances in the Qatari Stars Cup)	1	24	2
Al-Sailiya	2020-21	Qatar Stars League	17	2	2	0	—		8 (Note: Five appearances in the Qatari Stars Cup, and three appearances in the Qatar FA Cup)	1	27	3
Al-Sailiya	2021-22	Qatar Stars League	18	0	2	0	—		8 (Note: Six appearances in the Qatari Stars Cup, one appearance in the Qatar FA Cup, and one appearance in the Qatari Stars League relegation play-off)	0	28	0
Al-Sailiya	Total		57	3	4	0	1	0	17	2	79	5
Career total			253	17	19	0	39	4	66	6	377	27

=== International ===
As of 8 June 2018

Senegal
Year	Apps	Goals
2011	1	0
2012	1	0
2013	3	0
2014	7	1
2015	10	1
2016	6	0
2017	12	2
2018	1	0
Total	41	4

Scores and results list Senegal's goal tally first

Goal	Date	Venue	Opponent	Score	Result	Competition
1.	19 November 2014	Stade Léopold Sédar Senghor, Dakar, Senegal	Botswana	1–0	3–0	2015 Africa Cup of Nations qualification
2.	23 January 2015	Estadio de Mongomo, Mongomo, Equatorial Guinea	South Africa	1–1	1–1	2015 Africa Cup of Nations
3.	15 January 2017	Stade de Franceville, Franceville, Gabon	Tunisia	2–0	2–0	2017 Africa Cup of Nations
4.	14 November 2017	Stade Léopold Sédar Senghor, Dakar, Senegal	South Africa	2–1	2–1	2018 FIFA World Cup qualification

== Honours ==
=== Club ===
Genk

- Belgian Cup: 2012–13

Anderlecht

- Belgian First Division A: 2016–17
- Belgian Super Cup: 2017

Al-Sailiya SC

- Qatari Stars Cup: 2020-21, 2021-22
