= Łukasz Teodorczyk =

Polish footballer

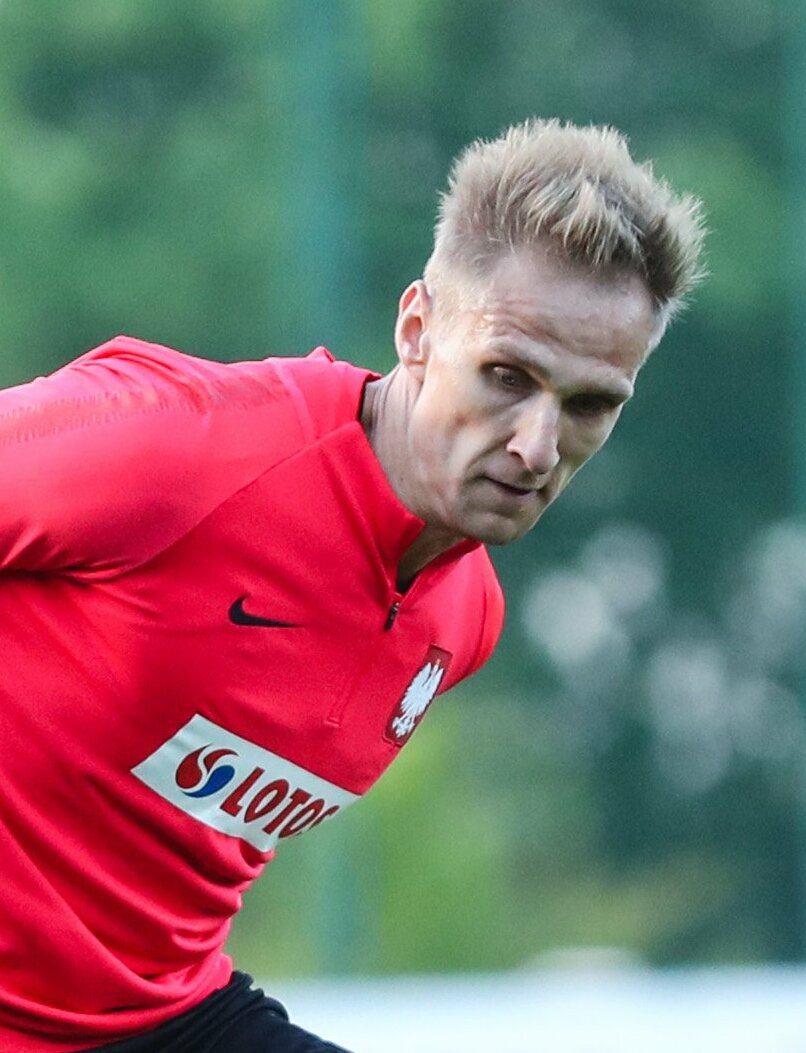
- Teodorczyk with Poland in 2018 during training

Personal information
- Full name: Łukasz Teodorczyk
- Date of birth: 3 June 1991 (age 35)
- Place of birth: Żuromin, Poland
- Height: 1.85 m (6 ft 1 in)
- Position: Striker

Youth career
- –2010: Wkra Żuromin
- 2010: Polonia Warsaw

Senior career*
Years	Team	Apps	(Gls)
2010–2013	Polonia Warsaw	30	(10)
2013–2014	Lech Poznań	50	(24)
2013	Lech Poznań II	1	(1)
2014–2017	Dynamo Kyiv	24	(10)
2016–2017	→ Anderlecht (loan)	28	(20)
2017–2018	Anderlecht	43	(17)
2018–2021	Udinese	30	(1)
2020–2021	→ Charleroi (loan)	15	(0)
2022	Vicenza	14	(1)
Total		235	(84)

International career
2010	Poland U20	3	(2)
2011–2012	Poland U21	6	(2)
2012–2018	Poland	19	(4)
- * Club domestic league appearances and goals

Łukasz Teodorczyk (Polish pronunciation: [ˈwukaʂ tɛɔˈdɔrt͡ʂɨk]; born 3 June 1991) is a Polish former professional footballer who played as a striker.

== Club career ==
=== Early career ===
Having joined Polonia Warsaw in January 2010, Teodorczyk made his Ekstraklasa debut on 29 October 2010. During the 2010–11 season, his first at Polonia, he featured in six outings for the senior team, and appeared in 21 games in the Młoda Ekstraklasa youth league, scoring 15 goals.

=== Lech Poznań ===
Before leaving Lech Poznań in August 2014, Teodorczyk had played four games and scored three goals, which qualified him for a medal when Lech won the Ekstraklasa in May 2015.

=== Dynamo Kyiv ===
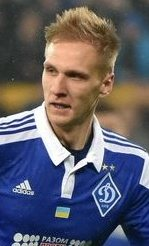
Teodorczyk with Dynamo Kyiv in 2016

On 27 August 2014, Teodorczyk signed a five-year contract with Ukrainian club Dynamo Kyiv, who reportedly paid €4 million for the transfer. He made his debut for Dynamo on 30 August 2014 in a 2–0 win against Chornomorets Odesa, coming on as a substitute in the 85th minute. About 15 seconds after he came on, he made an assist for 2–0. On 13 September 2014, he scored his first goal for Dynamo in a 2–2 draw against Zorya Luhansk. In his first season with Dynamo, he won his first league title, helping his team win the double of the Ukrainian Premier League and the Ukrainian Cup. In the league, he scored 5 goals in 13 appearances. He missed out on the cup final after sustaining an injury during the semi-final against Olimpik Donetsk, which kept him out for 2 months. On the international level, he reached the quarter finals of the Europa League with Dynamo, where the club was knocked out by Fiorentina 1–3 on aggregate. In the six matches he played in the Europa League, he scored 3 goals against the likes of Steaua București, EA Guingamp and Everton.

On 24 November 2015, Teodorczyk made his UEFA Champions League debut on matchday 5 of the group stage in a 2–0 away win against Portuguese club FC Porto, coming on as a substitute in the 87th minute. While he remained goalless in the competition, Dynamo reached the last sixteen of the UEFA Champions League that season before being eliminated by Manchester City 1–3 on aggregate. In the league, he scored 5 goals in 11 matches in the 2015–16 season.

==== Anderlecht (loan) ====
On 4 August 2016, Teodorczyk was loaned out to Belgian club R.S.C. Anderlecht for the season. He made his debut for Anderlecht on 7 August 2016 in a 5–0 win against Kortrijk and scored his first goal for the club that same day.

=== Anderlecht ===
On 30 March 2017, Teodorczyk signed a permanent contract with Anderlecht until 2020. Anderlecht paid a previously-agreed €4.5 million transfer fee to Dynamo Kyiv. He won the top scorer for the season 2016–17 Belgian First Division A with 22 goals.

=== Udinese ===
On 17 August 2018, Teodorczyk signed a permanent contract with Udinese. On 29 December 2021, after making no appearances during the 2021–22 season, his contract was terminated by mutual consent.

==== Loan to Charleroi ====
On 5 October 2020, he joined Belgian club Charleroi on loan.

=== Vicenza ===
On 4 January 2022, he signed with Italian Serie B club Vicenza until the end of the 2021–22 season, with an option to extend. He left the team following the season's conclusion.

=== Retirement ===
On 19 November 2022, Teodorczyk announced his retirement from football on Instagram.

== International career ==
After playing for the Poland national under-20 football team, Teodorczyk went on to feature for the U21 team and scored two goals in Poland's first qualification game for the European U21 Football Championship. He scored his first goals for the senior team on 2 February 2013, netting a brace in a 4–1 friendly win against Romania.

In May 2018, he was named in Poland's preliminary 35-man squad for the 2018 FIFA World Cup in Russia.

== Career statistics ==
=== Club ===
Appearances and goals by club, season and competition
Club	Season	League			National cup (Note: Includes Polish Cup, Ukrainian Cup, Belgian Cup, Coppa Italia)		Europe		Other		Total	
Club	Season	Division	Apps	Goals	Apps	Goals	Apps	Goals	Apps	Goals	Apps	Goals
Polonia Warsaw	2010–11	Ekstraklasa	6	0	1	1	—		—		7	1
Polonia Warsaw	2011–12	Ekstraklasa	11	4	0	0	—		—		11	4
Polonia Warsaw	2012–13	Ekstraklasa	13	6	1	0	—		—		14	6
Polonia Warsaw	Total		30	10	2	1	—		—		32	11
Lech Poznań	2012–13	Ekstraklasa	14	1	—		—		—		14	1
Lech Poznań	2013–14	Ekstraklasa	32	20	2	1	4 (Note: Appearances in UEFA Europa League)	3	—		38	24
Lech Poznań	2014–15	Ekstraklasa	4	3	0	0	2	0	—		6	3
Lech Poznań	Total		50	24	2	1	6	3	—		58	28
Lech Poznań II	2013–14	III liga, group C	1	1	—		—		—		1	1
Dynamo Kyiv	2014–15	Ukrainian Premier League	13	5	5	2	6	3	—		24	10
Dynamo Kyiv	2015–16	Ukrainian Premier League	11	5	3	1	4 (Note: Appearances in UEFA Champions League)	0	—		18	6
Dynamo Kyiv	Total		24	10	8	3	10	3	—		42	16
Anderlecht	2016–17	Belgian First Division A	38	22	2	1	13	7	—		53	30
Anderlecht	2017–18	Belgian First Division A	33	15	0	0	6	0	1 (Note: Appearance in Belgian Super Cup)	0	40	15
Anderlecht	Total		71	37	2	1	19	7	1	0	93	45
Udinese	2018–19	Serie A	16	1	0	0	—		—		16	1
Udinese	2019–20	Serie A	14	0	2	0	—		—		16	0
Udinese	Total		30	1	2	0	—		—		32	1
Charleroi (loan)	2020–21	Belgian First Division A	15	0	2	1	—		—		17	1
Vicenza	2021–22	Serie B	14	1	—		—		0	0	14	1
Career total			235	84	18	7	35	13	1	0	289	104

=== International ===
Appearances and goals by national team and year
National team	Year	Apps	Goals
Poland
Poland	2013	4	3
Poland	2014	3	0
Poland	2016	4	1
Poland	2017	3	0
Poland	2018	5	0
Total		19	4

Scores and results list Poland's goal tally first, score column indicates score after each Teodorczyk goal.

List of international goals scored by Łukasz Teodorczyk
No.	Date	Venue	Opponent	Score	Result	Competition
1	2 February 2013	Estadio Ciudad, Málaga, Spain	Romania	2–0	4–1	Friendly (not recognized by FIFA)
2	2 February 2013	Estadio Ciudad, Málaga, Spain	Romania	3–0	4–1	Friendly (not recognized by FIFA)
3	26 March 2013	National Stadium, Warsaw, Poland	San Marino	4–0	5–0	2014 World Cup qualifier
4	14 November 2016	Stadion Miejski, Wrocław, Poland	Slovenia	1–1	1–1	Friendly

== Honours ==
Lech Poznań

- Ekstraklasa: 2014–15

Dynamo Kyiv

- Ukrainian Premier League: 2014–15, 2015–16
- Ukrainian Cup: 2014–15
- Ukrainian Super Cup: 2016

Anderlecht

- Belgian First Division A: 2016–17
- Belgian Super Cup: 2017

Individual

- Młoda Ekstraklasa Player of the Season: 2010–11
- Młoda Ekstraklasa top scorer: 2010–11
- Belgian First Division A top goalscorer: 2016–17
