= Emmanuel Sowah Adjei =

Ghanaian footballer

Personal information
- Date of birth: 16 January 1998 (age 28)
- Place of birth: Ghana
- Height: 1.82 m (6 ft 0 in)
- Position: Right back

Youth career
- –2016: Dreams
- 2016: → Anderlecht (loan)

Senior career*
Years	Team	Apps	(Gls)
2016–2020	Anderlecht	10	(0)
2020–2022	Eupen	9	(0)
- * Club domestic league appearances and goals as of 9 April 2022

Emmanuel Sowah Adjei (born 16 January 1998) is a Ghanaian footballer who plays as a right back.

== Club career ==
He made his league debut on 21 August 2016 in the fourth game of the Jupiler Pro League 2016–17 season for Anderlecht against Eupen.

== Career statistics ==
As of match played 6 November 2017

Appearances and goals by club, season and competition
Club	Season	League			Cup		Europe		Other		Total	
Club	Season	Division	Apps	Goals	Apps	Goals	Apps	Goals	Apps	Goals	Apps	Goals
Anderlecht	2016–17	First Division A	9	0	0	0	5 (Note: Appearances in the Europa League)	0	—		14	0
Anderlecht	2017–18	First Division A	1	0	0	0	0	0	0	0	1	0
Career totals			10	0	0	0	5	0	0	0	15	0

== Honours ==
=== RSC Anderlecht ===
- Belgian Pro League (1): 2016–17
