= Matz Sels =

Belgian footballer (born 1992)

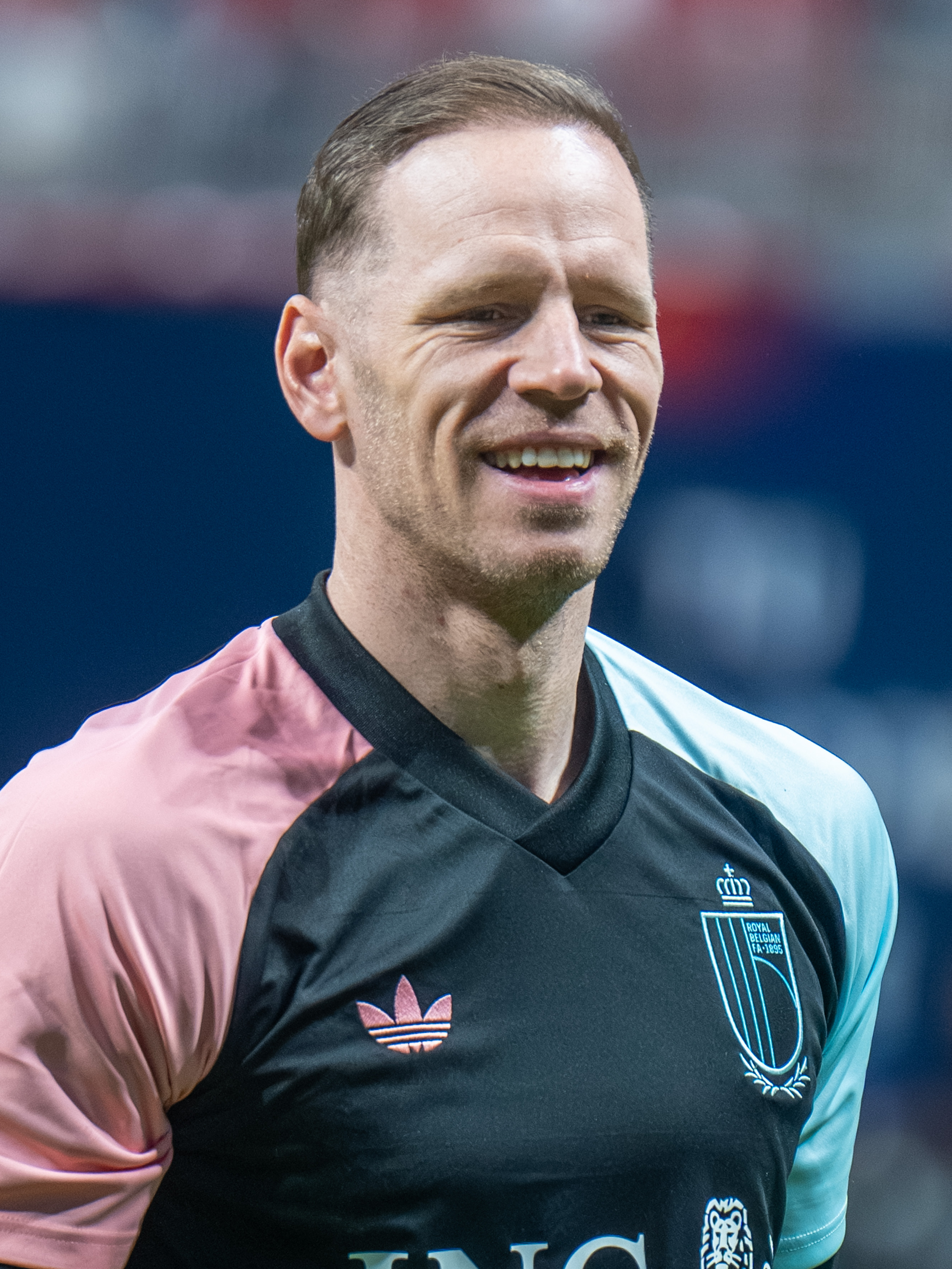
- Sels with Belgium in 2026

Personal information
- Full name: Matz Willy Els Sels
- Date of birth: 26 February 1992 (age 34)
- Place of birth: Lint, Belgium
- Height: 1.88 m (6 ft 2 in)
- Position: Goalkeeper

Team information
- Current team: Nottingham Forest
- Number: 26

Senior career*
| Years | Team | Apps | (Gls) |
| 2010–2014 | Lierse | 30 | (0) |
| 2014–2016 | Gent | 94 | (0) |
| 2016–2018 | Newcastle United | 9 | (0) |
| 2017–2018 | → Anderlecht (loan) | 32 | (0) |
| 2018–2024 | Strasbourg | 164 | (0) |
| 2024– | Nottingham Forest | 94 | (0) |

International career
| 2009 | Belgium U17 | 2 | (0) |
| 2009–2010 | Belgium U18 | 8 | (0) |
| 2010–2011 | Belgium U19 | 5 | (0) |
| 2012–2014 | Belgium U21 | 4 | (0) |
| 2021–2026 | Belgium | 13 | (0) |
- * Club domestic league appearances and goals as of 31 October 2026

Matz Willy Els Sels (Dutch pronunciation: [ˈmɑts ˈsɛls]; born 26 February 1992) is a Belgian professional footballer who plays as a goalkeeper for Premier League club Nottingham Forest.

== Club career ==
=== Lierse ===
Sels started his youth career at Kontich, and transferred to Lierse at the age of seven. Over there, he made his first-team debut in 2010. After the departure of Eiji Kawashima to Standard Liège in the summer of 2012, Sels became the first choice keeper. In his first game in the First Division, on 29 July 2012 against Gent, he saved a penalty. At the start of the 2013–14 season, when he refused to sign a new contract, he was demoted to the second team.

=== Gent ===
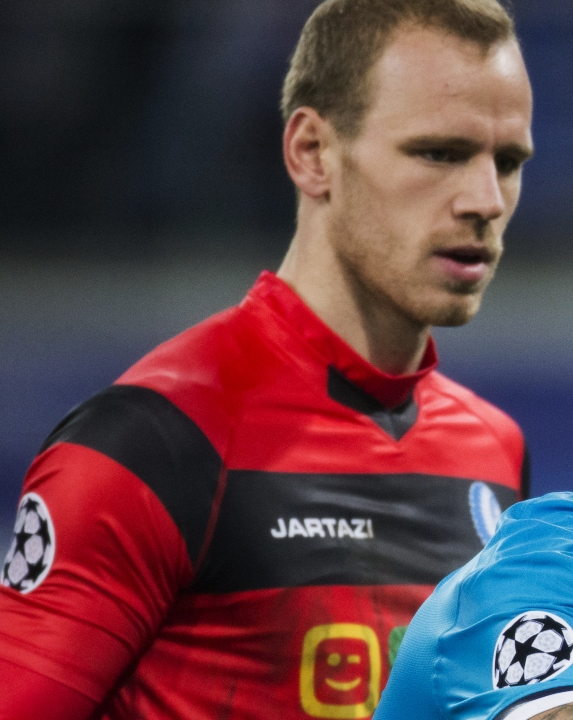
Sels playing for Gent in 2015

On 31 December 2013, it was announced that Sels would complete a transfer to Gent once the transfer window opened. He would become the number one goalkeeper as Frank Boeckx's contract was due to expire at the end of the season. Sels made his debut for Gent on 14 January 2014 against K.V. Kortrijk, in the quarter-finals of the Belgian Cup. He helped Gent qualify for the next round after penalties; with the game ending 1–1 on aggregate.

Sels played a key role in helping Gent become champions of the 2014–15 Belgian Pro League, the first national championship in the club's history. This triumph allowed Gent to qualify for the 2015–16 UEFA Champions League.

On his Champions League debut Sels dramatically saved an Alexandre Lacazette penalty to help his side secure a 1–1 draw with Lyon. On 13 January 2016 he was voted Best Goalkeeper of Belgium 2015.

=== Newcastle United ===
On 29 June 2016, Sels completed a transfer to Premier League club Newcastle United on a five-year contract for a reported transfer fee of £6.5 million. Sels made his Newcastle debut in the Championship on 5 August against Fulham. Sels kept a run of four clean sheets spanning 20 August to 13 September. Sels came under considerable fire from Newcastle fans for allowing a late equaliser from Aaron Tshibola at Aston Villa on 24 September. Despite receiving endorsement from manager Rafa Benítez during the week, Sels lost his place in the line-up to Karl Darlow against Norwich City on 28 September. His displacement from the line-up also received notable media coverage in his native Belgium. When Newcastle's next League Cup tilt came up, it was Sels who got the start, enjoying a clean sheet in a 6–0 victory over Preston North End on 25 October. On 22 June 2017, Sels signed for Anderlecht on a season-long loan.

=== Strasbourg ===
On 27 July 2018, Sels moved to Ligue 1 side Strasbourg for £3.5 million. In his first season at the club, he was awarded Strasbourg's player of the Season.

=== Nottingham Forest ===
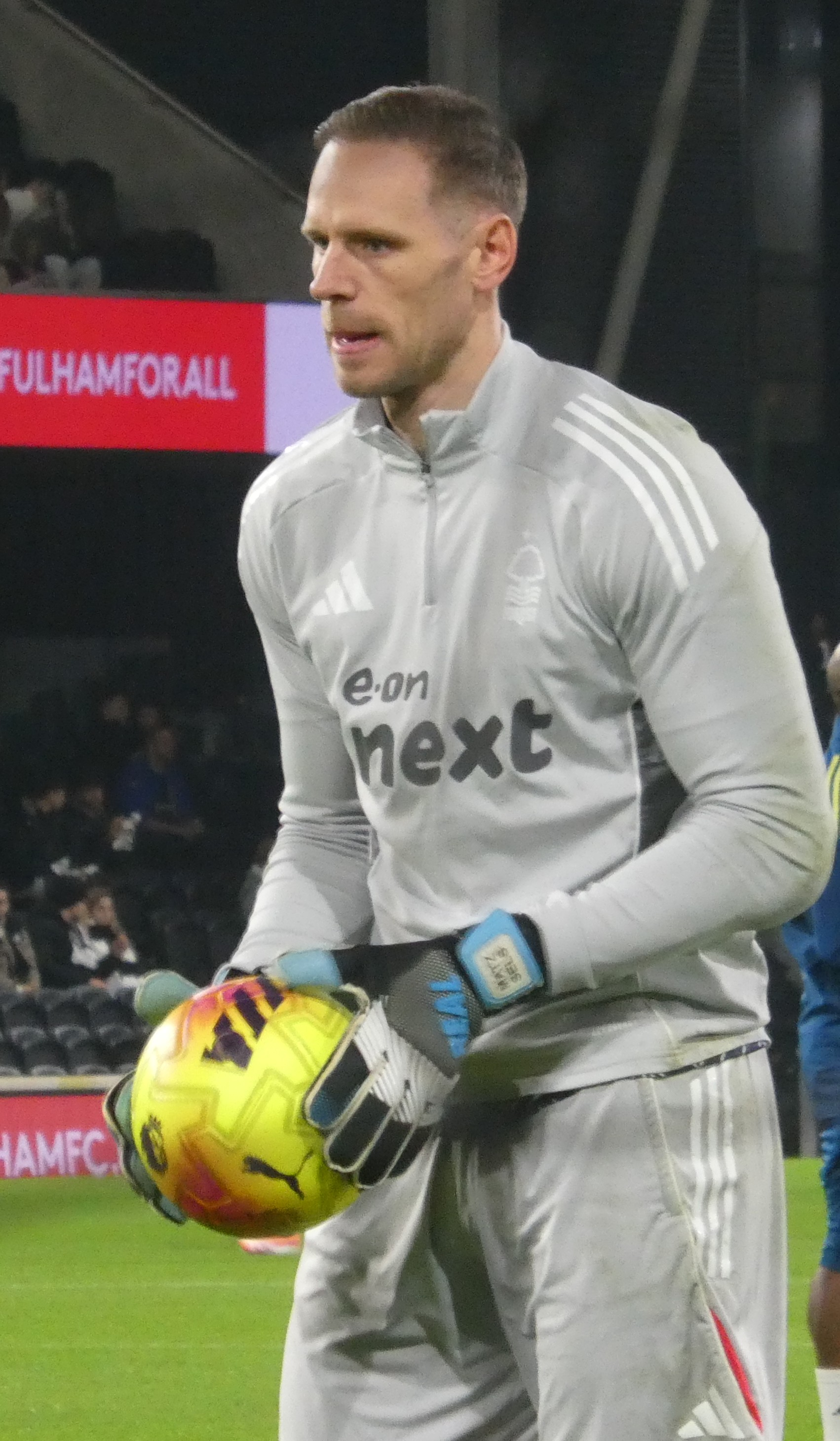
Sels with Nottingham Forest in 2025.

On 1 February 2024, Sels moved to Nottingham Forest. He made his Premier League debut for Forest 3 days later, in a 1–1 draw away to Bournemouth. On 2 March, Sels made a point-blank save in a match against Liverpool that earned him the Premier League Save of the Month award. By achieving that honour, he became the first ever Nottingham Forest player to win a Premier League monthly award.

Following the 2024–25 season, Sels was the first Nottingham Forest goalkeeper awarded the Premier League Golden Glove, shared with Arsenal's David Raya, after achieving 13 clean sheets.

== International career ==
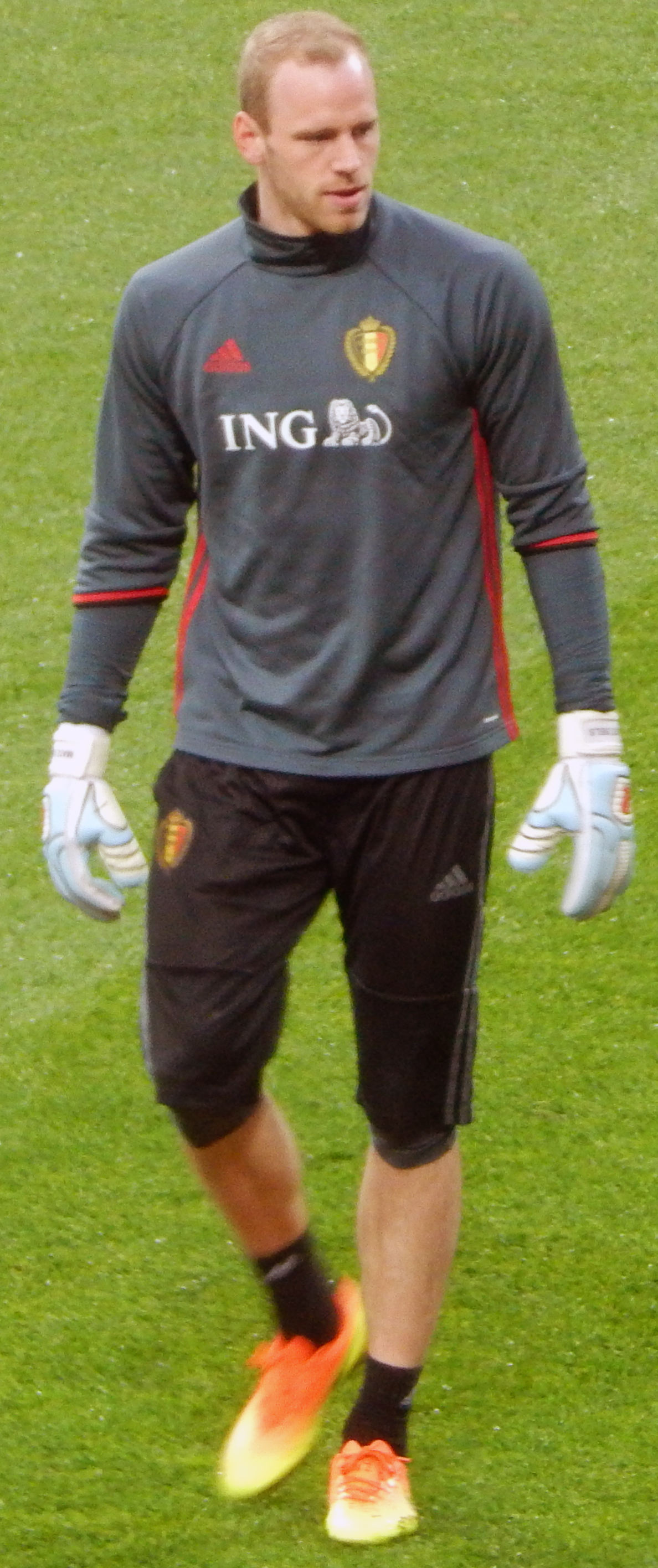
Sels with Belgium in 2017.

Sels was called up to the Belgium squad in October 2015 for UEFA Euro 2016 qualifiers against Andorra and Israel. He was named in the Roberto Martinez Belgian squad for the friendly against Saudi Arabia in Brussels on 27 March.

In May 2018 he was named in Belgium's preliminary squad for the 2018 FIFA World Cup in Russia. However, he did not make the final 23.

In May 2021, Sels was named in Belgium's provisional squad for the rescheduled UEFA Euro 2020.

He made his debut on 3 June 2021 in a friendly against Greece, coming on as a substitute for Simon Mignolet in the 90th minute.

== Career statistics ==
=== Club ===
As of match played 31 October 2026

Appearances and goals by club, season and competition
| Club | Season | League | | | National cup (Note: Includes Belgian Cup, FA Cup, Coupe de France) | | League cup (Note: Includes EFL Cup) | | Europe | | Other | | Total | |
| Club | Season | Division | Apps | Goals | Apps | Goals | Apps | Goals | Apps | Goals | Apps | Goals | Apps | Goals |
|---|---|---|---|---|---|---|---|---|---|---|---|---|---|---|
| Lierse | 2010–11 | Belgian Pro League | 0 | 0 | 0 | 0 | — | | — | | — | | 0 | 0 |
| Lierse | 2011–12 | Belgian Pro League | 0 | 0 | 0 | 0 | — | | — | | — | | 0 | 0 |
| Lierse | 2012–13 | Belgian Pro League | 30 | 0 | 1 | 0 | — | | — | | — | | 31 | 0 |
| Lierse | Total | | 30 | 0 | 1 | 0 | — | | — | | — | | 31 | 0 |
| Gent | 2013–14 | Belgian Pro League | 9 | 0 | 3 | 0 | — | | — | | 6 (Note: Appearances in Belgian Pro League play-offs) | 0 | 18 | 0 |
| Gent | 2014–15 | Belgian Pro League | 30 | 0 | 6 | 0 | — | | — | | 9 | 0 | 45 | 0 |
| Gent | 2015–16 | Belgian Pro League | 30 | 0 | 4 | 0 | — | | 8 (Note: Appearances in UEFA Champions League) | 0 | 11 (Note: Ten appearances in Belgian Pro League play-offs, one appearance in Belgian Super Cup) | 0 | 53 | 0 |
| Gent | Total | | 69 | 0 | 13 | 0 | — | | 8 | 0 | 26 | 0 | 116 | 0 |
| Newcastle United | 2016–17 | Championship | 9 | 0 | 3 | 0 | 2 | 0 | — | | — | | 14 | 0 |
| Anderlecht (loan) | 2017–18 | Belgian Pro League | 22 | 0 | 1 | 0 | — | | 3 | 0 | 11 | 0 | 37 | 0 |
| Strasbourg | 2018–19 | Ligue 1 | 37 | 0 | 1 | 0 | 0 | 0 | — | | — | | 38 | 0 |
| Strasbourg | 2019–20 | Ligue 1 | 27 | 0 | 2 | 0 | 0 | 0 | 6 (Note: Appearances in UEFA Europa League) | 0 | — | | 35 | 0 |
| Strasbourg | 2020–21 | Ligue 1 | 6 | 0 | 0 | 0 | — | | — | | — | | 6 | 0 |
| Strasbourg | 2021–22 | Ligue 1 | 37 | 0 | 1 | 0 | — | | — | | — | | 38 | 0 |
| Strasbourg | 2022–23 | Ligue 1 | 38 | 0 | 1 | 0 | — | | — | | — | | 39 | 0 |
| Strasbourg | 2023–24 | Ligue 1 | 20 | 0 | 0 | 0 | — | | — | | — | | 20 | 0 |
| Strasbourg | Total | | 165 | 0 | 5 | 0 | 0 | 0 | 6 | 0 | — | | 176 | 0 |
| Nottingham Forest | 2023–24 | Premier League | 16 | 0 | 0 | 0 | — | | — | | — | | 16 | 0 |
| Nottingham Forest | 2024–25 | Premier League | 38 | 0 | 4 | 0 | 0 | 0 | — | | — | | 42 | 0 |
| Nottingham Forest | 2025–26 | Premier League | 31 | 0 | 1 | 0 | 0 | 0 | 6 | 0 | — | | 38 | 0 |
| Nottingham Forest | 2026–27 | Premier League | 9 | 0 | 0 | 0 | 1 | 0 | — | | — | | 10 | 0 |
| Nottingham Forest | Total | | 94 | 0 | 5 | 0 | 1 | 0 | 6 | 0 | — | | 106 | 0 |
| Career total | | | 389 | 0 | 28 | 0 | 3 | 0 | 23 | 0 | 37 | 0 | 480 | 0 |

=== International ===
Appearances and goals by national team and year
| National team | Year | Apps | Goals |
|---|---|---|---|
| Belgium | 2021 | 1 | 0 |
| Belgium | 2022 | 1 | 0 |
| Belgium | 2023 | 4 | 0 |
| Belgium | 2024 | 2 | 0 |
| Belgium | 2025 | 4 | 0 |
| Belgium | 2026 | 1 | 0 |
| Total | | 13 | 0 |

== Honours ==
Gent

- Belgian Pro League: 2014–15
- Belgian Super Cup: 2015

Newcastle United

- EFL Championship: 2016–17

Anderlecht

- Belgian Super Cup: 2017

Strasbourg

- Coupe de la Ligue: 2018–19

Individual

- Belgian Professional Goalkeeper of the Season: 2015–16
- Ligue 1 Goalkeeper of the Season: 2021–22
- Premier League Save of the Month: March 2024
- Premier League Golden Glove: 2024–25 (shared)
- EA Sports FC Premier League Team of the Season: 2024–25
- Premier League Fan Team of the Season: 2024–25
- The Athletic Premier League Team of the Season: 2024–25
- PFA Team of the Year: 2024–25 Premier League
