= 2017 Belgian Super Cup =

Anderlecht	Zulte Waregem
League winners	Cup winners
2	1
- Date: 22 July 2017
- Venue: Constant Vanden Stock Stadium, Anderlecht

The 2017 Belgian Super Cup was a football match that took place on 22 July 2017 between Anderlecht, winners of the 2016–17 Belgian First Division A and Zulte Waregem, winners of the 2016–17 Belgian Cup. For the first time in Belgian football, a video assistant referee was used to review decisions during the match.

== Match ==
=== Details ===
22 July 2017
20:30 CEST

Anderlecht	2–1	Zulte Waregem
Hanni 46'; Trebel 59'		De fauw 3'

Constant Vanden Stock Stadium, Anderlecht
Referee: Sébastien Delferière

Anderlecht	Zulte Waregem

GK	1	(Belgium) Matz Sels
RB	12	(France) Dennis Appiah
CB	4	(Senegal) Kara Mbodji
CB	5	(Serbia) Uroš Spajić
LB	37	(Serbia) Ivan Obradović		(substituted off) 76'
CM	11	(Romania) Alexandru Chipciu
CM	20	(Belgium) Sven Kums
AM	94	(Algeria) Sofiane Hanni (c)
RW	25	(France) Adrien Trebel
LW	10	(Romania) Nicolae Stanciu		(substituted off) 65'
CF	91	(Poland) Łukasz Teodorczyk	(yellow card) 43'	(substituted off) 85'
Substitutes:
CF	9	(Nigeria) Henry Onyekuru		(substituted on) 65'
MF	8	(Belgium) Pieter Gerkens		(substituted on) 76'
CF	24	(Sweden) Isaac Kiese Thelin		(substituted on) 85'
LB	3	(Belgium) Olivier Deschacht
MF	17	(Belgium) Massimo Bruno
GK	45	(Belgium) Mile Svilar
Manager:
(Switzerland) René Weiler

GK	25	(Belgium) Louis Bostyn
RB	2	(Belgium) Davy De fauw (c)
CB	4	(Belgium) Michaël Heylen
CB	6	(Belgium) Timothy Derijck	(yellow card) 23'
LB	31	(Denmark) Brian Hämäläinen
CM	43	(Belgium) Sander Coopman		(substituted off) 66'
CM	11	(Belgium) Nill De Pauw		(substituted off) 79'
AM	23	(Belgium) Julien De Sart
RW	10	(Belgium) Onur Kaya
CF	99	(Nigeria) Peter Olayinka	(yellow card) 35'
LW	33	(Serbia) Ivan Šaponjić
Substitutes:
MF	20	(Ivory Coast) Idrissa Doumbia		(substituted on) 66'
FW	7	(Belgium) Aaron Leya Iseka	(yellow card) 90+4'	(substituted on) 79'
DF	14	(Netherlands) Sandy Walsh
MF	17	(Nigeria) Aliko Bala
FW	21	(Netherlands) Robert Mühren
FW	29	(Belgium) Alessandro Cordaro
GK	50	(Belgium) Yarno De Nayer
Manager:
(Belgium) Francky Dury

Match rules

- 90 minutes.
- Penalty shoot-out if scores level.
- Seven named substitutes.
- Maximum of three substitutions.

== See also ==
- 2017–18 Belgian First Division A
- 2017–18 Belgian Cup
