= Uroš Spajić =

Serbian footballer (born 1993)

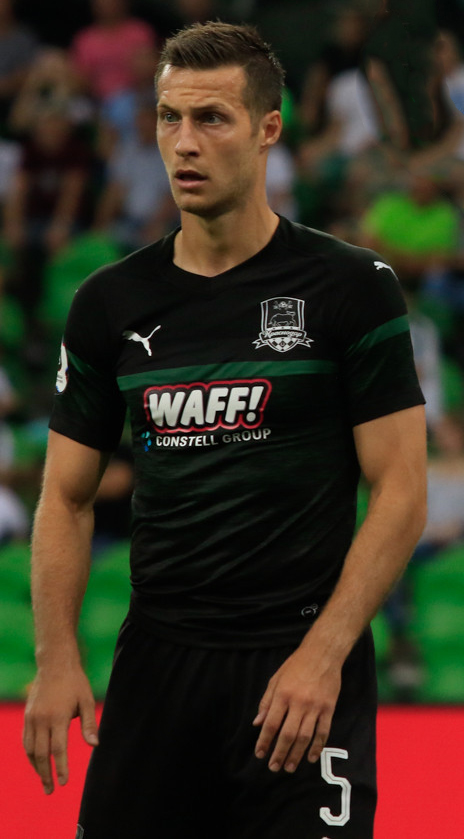
- Spajić with Krasnodar in 2018

Personal information
- Date of birth: 13 February 1993 (age 33)
- Place of birth: Belgrade, Serbia, FR Yugoslavia
- Height: 1.88 m (6 ft 2 in)
- Position: Centre-back

Team information
- Current team: Beijing Guoan
- Number: 25

Youth career
- Radnički Beograd
- Red Star Belgrade

Senior career*
Years	Team	Apps	(Gls)
2010–2013	Red Star Belgrade	16	(0)
2011–2012	→ Sopot (loan)	34	(0)
2013–2016	Toulouse	63	(0)
2016–2018	Anderlecht	56	(2)
2018–2021	Krasnodar	53	(2)
2020–2021	→ Feyenoord (loan)	20	(0)
2022	Kasımpaşa	8	(0)
2023–2025	Red Star Belgrade	37	(4)
2025–	Beijing Guoan	17	(0)

International career^{‡}
2015–2024	Serbia	21	(0)
- * Club domestic league appearances and goals as of 11 November 2026 ‡ National team caps and goals as of 4 June 2024

Uroš Spajić (Serbian Cyrillic: Урош Спајић, pronounced [ǔroʃ spâːjitɕ]; born 13 February 1993) is a Serbian professional footballer who plays as a center back for Chinese Super League club Beijing Guoan.

== Club career ==
=== Red Star Belgrade ===
Spajić made his professional debut for Red Star Belgrade on 27 October 2010 in a Serbian Cup match against Borac Čačak. He was subsequently loaned to Red Star's farm team Sopot in the Serbian third tier, where he played the 2011–12 season. In his final season at Red Star, he appeared in 16 games and became recognized as a player with remarkable qualities.

=== Toulouse ===
On 29 May 2013, Red Star Belgrade and Toulouse FC agreed on Spajić's transfer to the French side for €1.5 million. Spajić made his Toulouse debut against Valenciennes on the opening day of the 2013–14 season; after Steeve Yago committed a foul to concede a penalty, the uninvolved Spajić was sent off in an apparent case of mistaken identity.

=== Anderlecht ===
On 31 August 2016, Spajić joined Belgian club Anderlecht on a season-long loan deal. The deal was made permanent near the end of the 2016-17 season.

=== Krasnodar ===
On 26 May 2018, he signed a 5-year contract with the Russian Premier League side FC Krasnodar. Before the 2020–21 season, a new limit of 8 foreign players in a squad was introduced by the Russian Premier League. Spajić did not appear for Krasnodar in 2020 up to that point due to injury, and he was not registered with the league for the season. On 21 January 2022, his contract with Krasnodar was terminated by mutual consent.

=== Feyenoord ===
On 15 September 2020 he joined Feyenoord on loan for the remainder of the season. He made his debut for the club on 4 October 2020 by starting in the away game against Willem II, a match which was won 1–4.

=== Kasımpaşa ===
On 31 January 2022, Spajić joined Turkish club Kasımpaşa. In April 2022, he injured his knee ligaments, and missed the rest of the season and the 2022 World Cup. He left the club at the end of the season.

=== Red Star Belgrade ===
In December 2022, he signed a three-year deal with his home club, Red Star Belgrade.

=== Beijing Guoan ===
On 18 February 2025, Chinese Super League club Beijing Guoan announced that it has completed the signing of Spajić.

On 2 August 2025, Guoan announced that defender Uroš Spajić suffered an ACL injury in his right knee in the game against Shanghai Shenhua, sidelining him for the entire rest of the season.

== International career ==
Spajić first played for Serbia's U21 team in a friendly with Israel U21 on 6 February 2013. He played all three group matches for the team at the 2015 UEFA Under-21 Championship.

He made his debut for the Serbia national team on 4 September 2015 in a EURO 2016 qualifier against Armenia which Serbia won 2–0.

In June 2018 he was selected in Serbia's squad for the 2018 World Cup, but he failed to make any appearances there.

Spajić was selected in Serbia's squad for the UEFA Euro 2024, but didn't make any appearances in the tournament.

== Career statistics ==
=== Club ===
As of match played 22 July 2025

Appearances and goals by club, season and competition
Club	Season	League			National cup (Note: Includes Serbian Cup, Coupe de France, Belgian Cup, Russian Cup, KNVB Cup, Turkish Cup)		League cup		Continental		Other		Total	
Club	Season	Division	Apps	Goals	Apps	Goals	Apps	Goals	Apps	Goals	Apps	Goals	Apps	Goals
Red Star Belgrade	2010–11	Serbian Superliga	0	0	1	0	—		0	0	—		1	0
Red Star Belgrade	2012–13	Serbian Superliga	16	0	1	0	—		1 (Note: Appearances in UEFA Europa League)	0	—		18	0
Red Star Belgrade	Total		16	0	2	0	—		1	0	—		19	0
Sopot (loan)	2011–12	Serbian League Belgrade	34	0	—		—		—		—		34	0
Toulouse	2013–14	Ligue 1	32	0	1	0	1 (Note: Appearances in Coupe de la Ligue)	1	—		—		34	1
Toulouse	2014–15	Ligue 1	17	0	1	0	0	0	—		—		18	0
Toulouse	2015–16	Ligue 1	14	0	1	0	4	0	—		—		19	0
Toulouse	2016–17	Ligue 1	0	0	—		—		—		—		0	0
Toulouse	Total		63	0	3	0	5	1	—		—		71	1
Anderlecht	2016–17	Belgian First Division A	28	1	2	1	—		9	0	—		39	2
Anderlecht	2017–18	Belgian First Division A	28	1	2	0	—		5 (Note: Appearances in UEFA Champions League)	0	1 (Note: Appearance in Belgian Super Cup)	0	36	1
Anderlecht	Total		56	2	4	1	—		14	0	1	0	75	3
Krasnodar	2018–19	Russian Premier League	28	0	2	0	—		9	0	—		39	0
Krasnodar	2019–20	Russian Premier League	15	1	1	0	—		10 (Note: Four appearances in UEFA Champions League, six appearances in UEFA Europa League)	0	—		26	1
Krasnodar	2021–22	Russian Premier League	10	1	1	0	—		—		—		11	1
Krasnodar	Total		53	2	4	0	—		19	0	—		76	2
Feyenoord (loan)	2020–21	Eredivise	20	0	1	0	—		6	0	—		27	0
Kasımpaşa	2021–22	Süper Lig	8	0	1	0	—		—		—		9	0
Red Star Belgrade	2022–23	Serbian Superliga	3	1	0	0	—		—		—		3	1
Red Star Belgrade	2023–24	Serbian Superliga	25	2	4	1	—		1	0	—		30	3
Red Star Belgrade	2024–25	Serbian Superliga	9	1	0	0	—		9	1	—		18	2
Red Star Belgrade	Total		37	4	4	1	—		10	1	—		51	6
Beijing Guoan	2025	Chinese Super League	11	0	3	0	—		0	0	—		14	0
Career total			298	8	22	2	5	1	50	1	1	0	376	12

=== International ===
Serbia
Year	Apps	Goals
2015	2	0
2016	3	0
2017	0	0
2018	1	0
2019	5	0
2020	3	0
2021	6	0
2022	0	0
2023	0	0
2024	1	0
Total	21	0

== Honours ==
Anderlecht

- Belgian League: 2016–17
- Belgian Super Cup: 2017

Red Star Belgrade

- Serbian SuperLiga: 2022–23, 2023–24
- Serbian Cup: 2011-12, 2022–23, 2023–24

Beijing Guoan

- Chinese FA Cup: 2025

Individual

- Serbian SuperLiga Team of the Season: 2023–24
