= Adrien Trebel =

French footballer (born 1991)

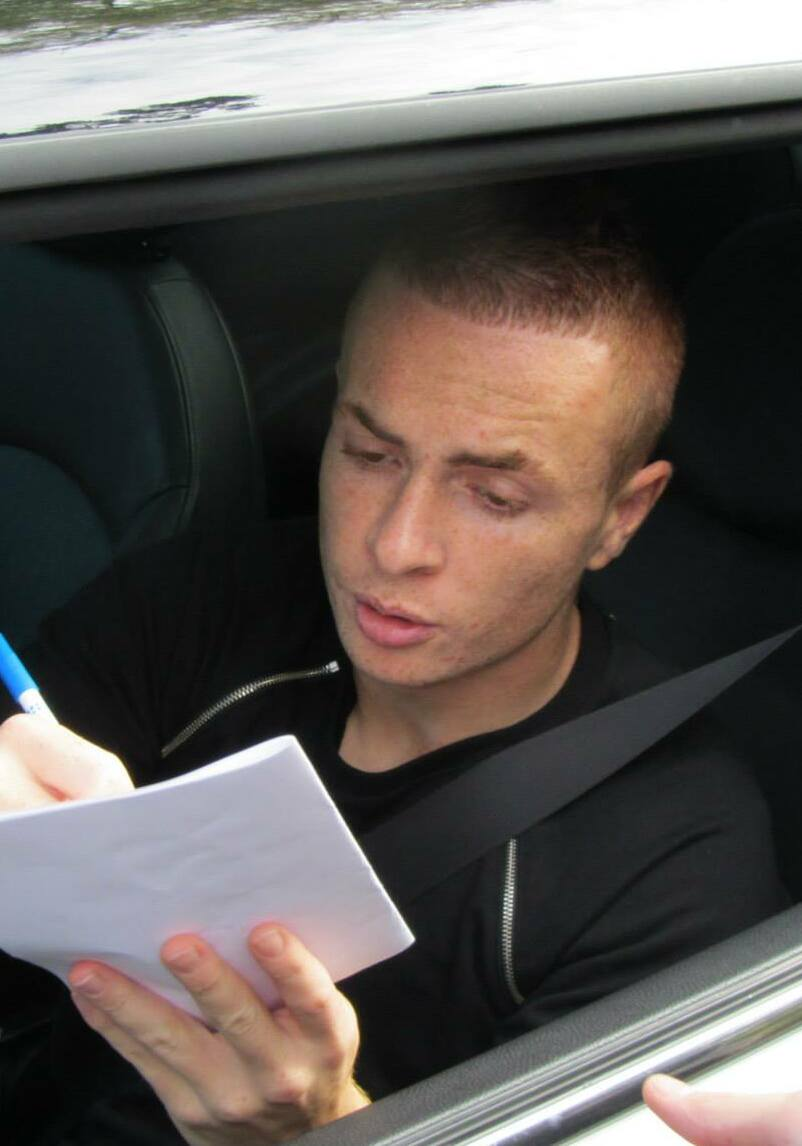
- Trebel signing autographs in 2014

Personal information
- Date of birth: 3 March 1991 (age 35)
- Place of birth: Dreux, France
- Height: 1.75 m (5 ft 9 in)
- Position: Midfielder

Youth career
- 1998–2001: COVernouillet
- 2001–2003: Dreux atlas
- 2003–2004: Chartres
- 2004–2010: Nantes

Senior career*
Years	Team	Apps	(Gls)
2010–2014	Nantes	93	(3)
2014–2017	Standard Liège	81	(5)
2017–2023	Anderlecht	108	(7)
2022	→ Lausanne-Sport (loan)	15	(1)
2023–2024	Charleroi	5	(0)

International career
2010–2011	France U20	10	(1)
2012	France U23	1	(0)
- * Club domestic league appearances and goals as of 11 May 2024

Adrien Trebel (born 3 March 1991) is a French professional footballer who plays as a midfielder.

== Club career ==
Trebel is a youth exponent from Nantes. He made his Ligue 2 debut at 10 February 2011 against Vannes OC replacing Ismaël Keïta after 72 minutes in a 1–0 away defeat. In 2014, he joined Belgian Pro League side Standard Liège. In January 2017, he joined Anderlecht.

On 31 January 2022, Trebel was loaned to Lausanne-Sport in Switzerland.

On 22 August 2023, Trebel signed a one-season contract with Charleroi.

== International career ==
Born in France, Trebel is of Malagasy descent through his mother. He was a youth international for the France U20. He was called up to the Madagascar national team for a set of friendlies in October 2023.

== Career statistics ==
=== Club ===
As of 20 May 2018

Appearances and goals by club, season and competitions
Club	Season	League			National Cup		League Cup		Continental		Other		Total	
Club	Season	Division	Apps	Goals	Apps	Goals	Apps	Goals	Apps	Goals	Apps	Goals	Apps	Goals
Nantes (Res)	2012–13	CFA 2	2	1	~	~	~	~	~	~	~	~	2	1
Nantes (Res)	2013–14	CFA	2	1	~	~	~	~	~	~	~	~	2	1
Nantes (Res)	Total		4	2	~	~	~	~	~	~	~	~	4	2
Nantes	2010–11	Ligue 2	16	0	3	0	0	0	~	~	~	~	19	0
Nantes	2011–12	Ligue 2	34	1	1	0	3	0	~	~	~	~	38	1
Nantes	2012–13	Ligue 2	31	2	3	1	0	0	~	~	~	~	34	3
Nantes	2013–14	Ligue 1	12	0	1	0	2	0	~	~	~	~	15	0
Nantes	Total		93	3	8	1	5	0	~	~	~	~	106	4
Standard Liège	2014–15	Pro League	31	2	2	2	~	~	6 (Note: Five appearances in the Europa League and one in the Champions League)	0	~	~	39	4
Standard Liège	2015–16	Pro League	30	1	6	2	~	~	4 (Note: Appearances in the Europa League)	0	~	~	40	3
Standard Liège	2016–17	Pro League	20	2	0	0	~	~	6	0	1 (Note: Appearances in the Belgian Super Cup)	0	27	2
Standard Liège	Total		81	5	8	4	~	~	16	0	1	0	106	9
Anderlecht	2016–17	First Division A	17	0	0	0	~	~	0	0	0	0	17	0
Anderlecht	2017–18	First Division A	33	2	1	0	~	~	6	0	1	1	41	3
Anderlecht	Total		50	2	1	0	~	~	6	0	1	1	58	3
Career total			228	12	17	5	5	0	22	0	2	1	275	18

== Honours ==
=== Club ===
==== Standard Liège ====
- Belgian Cup: 2015–16

==== RSC Anderlecht ====
- Belgian First Division: 2016–17
- Belgian Super Cup: 2017

=== Individual ===
- RSC Anderlecht Player of the Season: 2017-18
