= 2018–19 Udinese Calcio season =

Udinese
2018–19 season
- President: Franco Soldati
- Manager: Julio Velázquez (until 13 November 2018); Davide Nicola (from 13 November 2018 until 20 March 2019); Igor Tudor (from 21 March 2019)
- Stadium: Dacia Arena
- Serie A: 12th
- Coppa Italia: Third round
- Top goalscorer: League: Rodrigo De Paul (9); All: Rodrigo De Paul (9)
- Highest home attendance: 25,021 vs Juventus (6 October 2018, Serie A)
- Lowest home attendance: 15,141 vs Benevento (11 August 2018, Coppa Italia)
- Average home league attendance: 20,315
Home colours	Away colours	Third colours

The 2018–19 season was Udinese Calcio's 39th season in Serie A and their 24th consecutive season in the top-flight. The club competed in Serie A, finishing 12th, and the Coppa Italia, where they were eliminated in the third round.

Spanish coach Julio Velázquez was appointed to manage the club on 7 June, replacing former Juventus player and Croatia international Igor Tudor, who left the club after only one month in charge. However, Velázquez would be sacked 13 November 2018 and replaced by former Crotone manager Davide Nicola.

== Players ==
=== Squad information ===
Last updated on 26 May 2019
Appearances include league matches only

No.	Name	Nat	Position(s)	Date of birth (age)	Signed from	Signed in	Contract ends	Apps.	Goals
Goalkeepers
1	Juan Musso	(Argentina)	GK	6 May 1994 (aged 25)	(Argentina) Racing Club	2018	2023	29	0
88	Nícolas	(Brazil)	GK	12 April 1988 (aged 31)	(Italy) Hellas Verona	2018	2019	0	0
Defenders
3	Samir	(Brazil)	CB	5 December 1994 (aged 24)	(Brazil) Flamengo	2016	2023	73	4
4	Nicholas Opoku	(Ghana)	CB	11 August 1997 (aged 21)	(Tunisia) Club Africain	2018	2022	12	0
5	William Troost-Ekong	(Nigeria)	CB	1 September 1993 (aged 25)	(Turkey) Bursaspor	2018	2022	35	0
17	Bram Nuytinck	(Netherlands)	CB	4 May 1990 (aged 29)	(Belgium) Anderlecht	2017	2021	54	1
18	Hidde ter Avest	(Netherlands)	RB / CB / DM	20 May 1997 (aged 22)	(Netherlands) Twente	2018	2022	13	0
19	Jens Stryger Larsen	(Denmark)	RB	21 February 1991 (aged 28)	Austria Wien	2017	2021	66	2
24	Ben Wilmot	(England)	CB	4 November 1999 (aged 19)	(England) Watford	2019	2019	5	0
87	Sebastian De Maio	(France)	CB	5 March 1987 (aged 32)	(Italy) Bologna	2019	2019	16	1
90	Marvin Zeegelaar	(Netherlands)	LB / LM / LW	12 August 1990 (aged 28)	(England) Watford	2019	2019	12	0
Midfielders
6	Seko Fofana	(Ivory Coast)	CM / DM / AM	7 May 1995 (aged 24)	(England) Manchester City	2016	2022	80	10
8	Emmanuel Agyemang-Badu	(Ghana)	CM / DM	2 December 1990 (aged 28)	(Ghana) Berekum Arsenal	2010	2020	167	10
11	Valon Behrami	(Switzerland)	DM / RM / CM	19 April 1985 (aged 34)	(England) Watford	2017	2019	39	2
13	Svante Ingelsson	(Sweden)	RM / LM / LW	14 June 1998 (aged 21)	(Sweden) Kalmar FF	2017	2021	10	1
14	Petar Mićin	(Serbia)	RW	29 September 1998 (aged 20)	(Serbia) Čukarički	2018		1	0
20	Emil Hallfreðsson	(Iceland)	CM / LM / DM	29 June 1984 (aged 35)	(Italy) Hellas Verona	2016	2020	61	1
30	Sandro	(Brazil)	DM	15 March 1989 (aged 30)	(Italy) Genoa	2019	2019	12	0
38	Rolando Mandragora	(Italy)	CM / DM / CB	29 June 1997 (aged 22)	(Italy) Juventus	2018	2022	35	3
72	Antonín Barák	(Czech Republic)	AM / DM / CM	3 December 1994 (aged 24)	(Czech Republic) Slavia Prague	2017	2022	42	7
77	Marco D'Alessandro	(Italy)	RW / LW / RM	17 February 1991 (aged 28)	(Italy) Atalanta	2018	2019	24	0
Forwards
7	Stefano Okaka	(Italy)	CF	9 August 1989 (aged 29)	(England) Watford	2019	2019	16	6
10	Rodrigo De Paul	(Argentina)	RW / LW / AM	24 May 1994 (aged 25)	(Spain) Valencia	2016	2021	107	17
15	Kevin Lasagna	(Italy)	CF / SS / LW	10 August 1992 (aged 26)	(Italy) Carpi	2017	2020	65	18
23	Ignacio Pussetto	(Argentina)	RW / CF / LW	21 December 1995 (aged 23)	(Argentina) Huracán	2018	2023	35	4
91	Łukasz Teodorczyk	(Poland)	CF / SS	3 June 1991 (aged 28)	(Belgium) Anderlecht	2018	2022	16	1
Players transferred during the season
2	Molla Wagué	(Mali)	CB	21 February 1991 (aged 28)	(Spain) Granada	2017	2019	3	0
7	Giuseppe Pezzella	(Italy)	LB	29 November 1997 (aged 21)	(Italy) Palermo	2017	2022	19	0
9	Felipe Vizeu	(Brazil)	CF	12 March 1997 (aged 22)	(Brazil) Flamengo	2018	2023	5	0
16	Darwin Machís	(Venezuela)	LW / CF / RW	7 February 1993 (aged 26)	(Spain) Granada	2018	2022	13	0
21	Simone Pontisso	(Italy)	DM	20 March 1997 (aged 22)	(Italy) Youth Sector	2016	2022	2	0
22	Simone Scuffet	(Italy)	GK	31 May 1996 (aged 23)	(Italy) Youth Sector	2013	2022	39	0
53	Ali Adnan Kadhim	(Iraq)	LB	19 December 1993 (aged 25)	(Turkey) Çaykur Rizespor	2015	2020	66	2
98	Mamadou Coulibaly	(Senegal)	CM	3 February 1999 (aged 20)	(Italy) Pescara	2017	2022	0	0
99	Andrija Balić	(Croatia)	CM / AM / DM	11 August 1997 (aged 21)	(Croatia) Hajduk Split	2016	2020	29	1
—	Gabriele Angella	(Italy)	CB	28 April 1989 (aged 30)	(England) Watford	2016	2020	26	1

== Transfers ==
=== In ===
Date	Pos.	Player	Age	Moving from	Fee	Notes	Source
1 July 2018	MF	(Senegal) Mamadou Coulibaly	19	(Italy) Pescara	Loan return		
1 July 2018	MF	(Brazil) Lucas Evangelista	23	(Portugal) Estoril	Loan return		
1 July 2018	FW	(Brazil) Ewandro	22	(Portugal) Estoril	Loan return		
1 July 2018	MF	(Sweden) Melker Hallberg	22	(Sweden) Kalmar FF	Loan return		
1 July 2018	DF	(France) Thomas Heurtaux	29	(Italy) Hellas Verona	Loan return		
1 July 2018	GK	(Greece) Orestis Karnezis	32	(England) Watford	Loan return		
1 July 2018	FW	(Mali) Aly Mallé	20	(Spain) Lorca	Loan return		
1 July 2018	GK	(Italy) Alex Meret	21	(Italy) SPAL	Loan return		
11 July 2018	GK	(Argentina) Juan Musso	24	(Argentina) Racing Club	Undisclosed		
18 July 2018	FW	(Venezuela) Darwin Machís	25	(Spain) Granada	Undisclosed		
19 July 2018	FW	(Argentina) Ignacio Pussetto	22	(Argentina) Huracán	€8M		
26 July 2018	MF	(Italy) Rolando Mandragora	21	(Italy) Juventus	€20M	Buyback clause included	
17 August 2018	FW	(Poland) Łukasz Teodorczyk	27	(Belgium) Anderlecht	€7M		
17 August 2018	DF	(Nigeria) William Troost-Ekong	24	(Turkey) Bursaspor	€3.3M		

==== Loans in ====
Date	Pos.	Player	Age	Moving from	Fee	Notes	Source
31 July 2018	GK	(Brazil) Nícolas	30	(Italy) Hellas Verona	Loan		
17 August 2018	MF	(Italy) Marco D'Alessandro	27	(Italy) Atalanta	Loan	Loan with an option to buy	
8 January 2019	FW	(Italy) Stefano Okaka	29	(England) Watford	Loan	Loan with an option to buy	

=== Out ===
Date	Pos.	Player	Age	Moving to	Fee	Notes	Source
1 July 2018	GK	(Argentina) Albano Bizzarri	40	Unattached	Free	End of contract	
1 July 2018	FW	(Argentina) Maxi López	34	Unattached	Free	End of contract	
1 July 2018	DF	(Italy) Francesco Zampano	24	(Italy) Pescara	Loan return		
5 July 2018	GK	(Italy) Alex Meret	21	(Italy) Napoli	Undisclosed		
5 July 2018	GK	(Greece) Orestis Karnezis	32	(Italy) Napoli	Undisclosed		
12 July 2018	DF	(Switzerland) Silvan Widmer	25	(Switzerland) Basel	Undisclosed		
27 July 2018	MF	(Brazil) Lucas Evangelista	23	(France) Nantes	Undisclosed		
31 July 2018	MF	(Iceland) Emil Hallfreðsson	34	(Italy) Frosinone	Undisclosed		
20 August 2018	DF	(France) Thomas Heurtaux	30	(Turkey) Ankaragücü	Undisclosed		

==== Loans out ====
Date	Pos.	Player	Age	Moving to	Fee	Notes	Source
11 June 2018	FW	(Brazil) Ryder Matos	25	(Italy) Hellas Verona	Loan	Loan with an option to buy	
6 July 2018	DF	(Italy) Mauro Coppolaro	21	(Italy) Venezia	Loan		
6 July 2018	MF	(Czech Republic) Jakub Jankto	22	(Italy) Sampdoria	Loan	Loan with obligation to buy for €15M	
10 July 2018	GK	(Italy) Samuele Perisan	20	(Italy) Padova	Loan		
18 July 2018	FW	(Croatia) Stipe Perica	23	(Italy) Frosinone	Loan		
7 August 2018	DF	(Poland) Paweł Bochniewicz	22	(Poland) Górnik Zabrze	Loan	Loan with an option to buy	
7 August 2018	FW	(Brazil) Ewandro	22	Austria Wien	Loan	Loan with an option to buy	
7 August 2018	DF	(Chile) Francisco Sierralta	21	(Italy) Parma	Loan		
16 August 2018	DF	(Brazil) Danilo	34	(Italy) Bologna	Loan	Loan with an obligation to buy	
17 August 2018	DF	(Iraq) Ali Adnan Kadhim	24	(Italy) Atalanta	Loan	Loan with an option to buy	
31 August 2018	DF	(Italy) Gabriele Angella	29	(Belgium) Charleroi	Loan		

== Competitions ==
=== Serie A ===
==== League table ====
Pos	Team	Pld	W	D	L	GF	GA	GD	Pts
10	Bologna	38	11	11	16	48	56	−8	44
11	Sassuolo	38	9	16	13	53	60	−7	43
12	Udinese	38	11	10	17	39	53	−14	43
13	SPAL	38	11	9	18	44	56	−12	42
14	Parma	38	10	11	17	41	61	−20	41 (Note: Positions determined by head-to-head points: Parma: 9 pts; Cagliari: 7 pts; Fiorentina: 1 pt.)

Source: Serie A, Soccerway
Rules for classification: 1) Points; 2) Head-to-head points; 3) Head-to-head goal difference; 4) Goal difference; 5) Goals scored; 6) Draw. (Note: Head-to-head record is used only after all the matches between the teams in question have been played).

==== Results summary ====
Overall								Home						Away					
Pld	W	D	L	GF	GA	GD	Pts	W	D	L	GF	GA	GD	W	D	L	GF	GA	GD
38	11	10	17	39	53	−14	43	8	5	6	22	22	0	3	5	11	17	31	−14

Last updated: 26 May 2019.
Source: Competitive matches

==== Results by round ====
Round	1	2	3	4	5	6	7	8	9	10	11	12	13	14	15	16	17	18	19	20	21	22	23	24	25	26	27	28	29	30	31	32	33	34	35	36	37	38
Ground	A	H	A	H	A	H	A	H	H	A	H	A	H	A	H	A	H	A	H	H	A	H	A	H	A	H	A	A	H	A	H	A	H	A	H	A	H	A
Result	D	W	L	D	W	L	L	L	L	D	L	L	W	D	L	L	D	D	W	L	L	D	L	W	L	W	L	L	W	D	W	L	D	L	D	W	W	W
Position	9	7	11	11	8	11	14	15	16	16	16	17	16	16	17	17	17	17	15	15	16	16	16	15	15	15	15	16	16	15	15	16	17	17	17	16	16	12

Updated to match(es) played on 26 May 2019. Source: Competitive matches
A = Away; H = Home; W = Win; D = Draw; L = Loss

==== Matches ====
19 August 2018 1	Parma	2–2	Udinese	Parma
20:30 CEST (UTC+02:00)	Inglese 43'; Barillà 59'; Gobbi (yellow card) 84'; Iacoponi (yellow card) 86'	Report	Lasagna (yellow card) 57'; De Paul 65' (pen.); Fofana 69', (yellow card) 90+3'	Stadium: Stadio Ennio Tardini; Attendance: 13,141; Referee: Gianpaolo Calvarese

26 August 2018 2	Udinese	1–0	Sampdoria	Udine
20:30 CEST (UTC+02:00)	De Paul 9'; Nuytinck (yellow card) 86'	Report	Bereszyński (yellow card) 26'; Ramírez (yellow card) 57'; Murru (yellow card) 67'	Stadium: Dacia Arena; Attendance: 15,770; Referee: Federico La Penna

2 September 2018 3	Fiorentina	1–0	Udinese	Florence
18:00 CEST (UTC+02:00)	Gerson (yellow card) 60'; Benassi 73'; Pezzella (yellow card) 86'; Biraghi (yellow card) 89'	Report	Fofana (yellow card) 63'	Stadium: Stadio Artemio Franchi; Attendance: 31,009; Referee: Antonio Giua

16 September 2018 4	Udinese	1–1	Torino	Udine
15:00 CEST (UTC+02:00)	De Paul 28'; Fofana (yellow card) 54'; Machís (yellow card) 89'	Report	Zaza (yellow card) 38'; Soriano (yellow card) 43'; Meïté 49'	Stadium: Dacia Arena; Attendance: 18,813; Referee: Paolo Valeri

23 September 2018 5	Chievo	0–2	Udinese	Verona
15:00 CEST (UTC+02:00)	Giaccherini (yellow card) 90+3'	Report	De Paul 76'; Behrami (yellow card) 83'; Lasagna 90'	Stadium: Stadio Marc'Antonio Bentegodi; Attendance: 10,000; Referee: Luca Pairetto

26 September 2018 6	Udinese	1–2	Lazio	Udine
19:00 CEST (UTC+02:00)	Badelj 80' (o.g.); Pussetto (yellow card) 88'; Troost-Ekong (yellow card) 90+1'	Report	Lulić (yellow card) 42'; Acerbi 61'; Correa 66'; Immobile (yellow card) 81'; Badelj (yellow card) 85'; Bastos (yellow card) 87'; Durmisi (yellow card) 87'; Strakosha (yellow card) 90+4'	Stadium: Dacia Arena; Attendance: 19,455; Referee: Fabio Maresca

30 September 2018 7	Bologna	2–1	Udinese	Bologna
12:30 CEST (UTC+02:00)	Santander 42'; Svanberg (yellow card) 47'; Nagy (yellow card) 58'; Orsolini 82'	Report	Pussetto 32', (yellow card) 54'; De Paul (yellow card) 69'; Behrami (yellow card) 72'; Machís (yellow card) 90+1'	Stadium: Stadio Renato Dall'Ara; Attendance: 19,039; Referee: Gianluca Manganiello

6 October 2018 8	Udinese	0–2	Juventus	Udine
18:00 CEST (UTC+02:00)	De Paul (yellow card) 50'; Samir (yellow card) 80'; Lasagna (yellow card) 82'	Report	Bentancur 33'; Ronaldo 37'; Mandžukić (yellow card) 90+4'	Stadium: Dacia Arena; Attendance: 25,021; Referee: Rosario Abisso

20 October 2018 9	Udinese	0–3	Napoli	Udine
20:30 CEST (UTC+02:00)	Pussetto (yellow card) 15'; Stryger Larsen (yellow card) 57'; Opoku (yellow card) 79'	Report	Fabián 14'; Milik (yellow card) 36'; Albiol (yellow card) 45'; Allan (yellow card) 56'; Mertens (yellow card) 59', (goal) 82' (pen.); Rog 86'	Stadium: Dacia Arena; Attendance: 21,449; Referee: Maurizio Mariani

28 October 2018 10	Genoa	2–2	Udinese	Genoa
15:00 CET (UTC+01:00)	Rômulo 32' (pen.); Biraschi (yellow card) 37'; Romero (yellow card) 56' (yellow-red card) 74', (goal) 67'; Kouamé (yellow card) 58'; Mazzitelli (yellow card) 81'	Report	Samir (yellow card) 15'; Behrami (yellow card) 19'; Opoku (yellow card) 24'; Lasagna 65'; Musso (yellow card) 66'; De Paul 70'	Stadium: Stadio Luigi Ferraris; Attendance: 18,880; Referee: Paolo Mazzoleni

4 November 2018 11	Udinese	0–1	Milan	Udine
20:30 CET (UTC+01:00)	Samir (yellow card) 28'; Troost-Ekong (yellow card) 64'; Pussetto (yellow card) 71'; Nuytinck (red card) 90+5'	Report	Kessié (yellow card) 48'; Zapata (yellow card) 68'; Romagnoli 90+7', (yellow card) 90+8'	Stadium: Dacia Arena; Attendance: 23,540; Referee: Marco Di Bello

11 November 2018 12	Empoli	2–1	Udinese	Empoli
15:00 CET (UTC+01:00)	Di Lorenzo (yellow card) 21'; Zajc 41'; Krunić (yellow card) 45+1'; Caputo 51'	Report	Mandragora (yellow card) 25'; Fofana (yellow card) 40'; Pussetto 81'	Stadium: Stadio Carlo Castellani; Attendance: 7,553; Referee: Piero Giacomelli

24 November 2018 13	Udinese	1–0	Roma	Udine
15:00 CET (UTC+01:00)	De Paul 54', (yellow card) 64'; Behrami (yellow card) 65'	Report		Stadium: Dacia Arena; Attendance: 21,986; Referee: Michael Fabbri

2 December 2018 14	Sassuolo	0–0	Udinese	Reggio Emilia
15:00 CET (UTC+01:00)	Ferrari (yellow card) 4'; Lirola (yellow card) 79'; Matri (yellow card) 87'	Report	De Paul (yellow card) 33'; Pezzella (yellow card) 51'	Stadium: Mapei Stadium – Città del Tricolore; Attendance: 10,655; Referee: Marco Guida

9 December 2018 15	Udinese	1–3	Atalanta	Udine
15:00 CET (UTC+01:00)	Lasagna 12'; Stryger Larsen (yellow card) 45+1'	Report	Zapata 2', 62', 80'; Masiello (yellow card) 76'	Stadium: Dacia Arena; Attendance: 24,413; Referee: Gianpaolo Calvarese

15 December 2018 16	Internazionale	1–0	Udinese	Milan
18:00 CET (UTC+01:00)	Asamoah (yellow card) 20'; Politano (yellow card) 58'; Icardi 76' (pen.); Martínez (yellow card) 79'	Report	Musso (yellow card) 71'	Stadium: San Siro; Attendance: 57,025; Referee: Rosario Abisso

22 December 2018 17	Udinese	1–1	Frosinone	Udine
15:00 CET (UTC+01:00)	Mandragora 32'; Behrami (yellow card) 73'; D'Alessandro (yellow card) 83'	Report	Cassata (yellow card) 6'; Krajnc (yellow card) 8'; Ciano 61' (pen.); Chibsah (yellow card) 75'; Sportiello (yellow card) 78'	Stadium: Dacia Arena; Attendance: 15,954; Referee: Paolo Valeri

26 December 2018 18	SPAL	0–0	Udinese	Ferrara
18:00 CET (UTC+01:00)	Schiattarella (yellow card) 37'	Report	De Paul (yellow card) 50'; Mandragora (yellow card) 89'	Stadium: Stadio Paolo Mazza; Attendance: 13,195; Referee: Daniele Doveri

29 December 2018 19	Udinese	2–0	Cagliari	Udine
15:00 CET (UTC+01:00)	Nuytinck (yellow card) 26'; Pussetto 39', (yellow card) 67'; Stryger Larsen (yellow card) 45'; Behrami 57'; Mandragora (red card) 79'	Report	Farias (yellow card) 45'; Ceppitelli (red card) 51'; Bradarić (yellow card) 85'	Stadium: Dacia Arena; Attendance: 17,918; Referee: Maurizio Mariani

19 January 2019 20	Udinese	1–2	Parma	Udine
18:00 CET (UTC+01:00)	Opoku (yellow card) 34'; Okaka (yellow card) 39', (goal) 50'; D'Alessandro (yellow card) 68'	Report	Inglese 11' (pen.); Deiola (yellow card) 55'; Gervinho 68'	Stadium: Dacia Arena; Attendance: 15,889; Referee: Paolo Mazzoleni

26 January 2019 21	Sampdoria	4–0	Udinese	Genoa
18:00 CET (UTC+01:00)	Quagliarella 33' (pen.), 56' (pen.); Praet (yellow card) 37'; Audero (yellow card) 59'; Linetty 68'; Gabbiadini 78'	Report	Nuytinck (yellow card) 53'; Opoku (yellow card) 55'; Okaka (yellow card) 61'; Mandragora (yellow card) 70'	Stadium: Stadio Luigi Ferraris; Attendance: 18,020; Referee: Davide Massa

3 February 2019 22	Udinese	1–1	Fiorentina	Udine
15:00 CET (UTC+01:00)	Mandragora (yellow card) 43'; Stryger Larsen 56'; Pussetto (yellow card) 74'; Behrami (yellow card) 80'	Report	Milenković (yellow card) 17'; Gerson (yellow card) 59'; Laurini (yellow card) 60'; Fernandes 65'	Stadium: Dacia Arena; Attendance: 18,118; Referee: Daniele Orsato

10 February 2019 23	Torino	1–0	Udinese	Turin
15:00 CET (UTC+01:00)	Aina 31'; Lukić (yellow card) 36'; Djidji (yellow card) 74'	Report	De Paul (yellow card) 65'; De Maio (yellow card) 79' (yellow-red card) 90+8'; Troost-Ekong (yellow card) 86'	Stadium: Stadio Olimpico Grande Torino; Attendance: 16,557; Referee: Marco Guida

17 February 2019 24	Udinese	1–0	Chievo	Udine
15:00 CET (UTC+01:00)	Pussetto (yellow card) 65'; Nuytinck (yellow card) 71'; Fofana (yellow card) 75'; Teodorczyk 86', (yellow card) 87'; Zeegelaar (yellow card) 90'	Report	Léris (yellow card) 15'; Depaoli (yellow card) 58'; Đorđević (yellow card) 85'; Giaccherini (yellow card) 87'	Stadium: Dacia Arena; Attendance: 18,008; Referee: Paolo Valeri

3 March 2019 26	Udinese	2–1	Bologna	Udine
15:00 CET (UTC+01:00)	De Paul 25' (pen.); Mandragora (yellow card) 38'; Zeegelaar (yellow card) 51'; Pussetto 79'; Okaka (yellow card) 90+2'	Report	Poli (yellow card) 23'; Palacio 39'; Santander (yellow card) 81'; Dijks (yellow card) 89'	Stadium: Dacia Arena; Attendance: 18,349; Referee: Davide Massa

8 March 2019 27	Juventus	4–1	Udinese	Turin
20:30 CET (UTC+01:00)	Kean 11', 39'; Can 67' (pen.); Matuidi 71'	Report	Stryger Larsen (yellow card) 27'; Pussetto (yellow card) 50'; Opoku (yellow card) 53'; Lasagna 85'	Stadium: Allianz Stadium; Attendance: 39,987; Referee: Daniele Chiffi

17 March 2019 28	Napoli	4–2	Udinese	Naples
18:00 CET (UTC+01:00)	Zieliński (yellow card) 11'; Younes 17'; Callejón 26'; Milik 57'; Mertens 69'	Report	Sandro (yellow card) 13'; Lasagna 30'; Fofana 36'	Stadium: Stadio San Paolo; Attendance: 25,718; Referee: Paolo Valeri

30 March 2019 29	Udinese	2–0	Genoa	Udine
15:00 CEST (UTC+02:00)	Okaka 4'; Stryger Larsen (yellow card) 33'; Sandro (yellow card) 38'; Zeegelaar (yellow card) 40'; Mandragora 62'	Report	Rolón (yellow card) 5'; Criscito (yellow card) 42'; Bessa (yellow card) 46'; Pereira (yellow card) 78'	Stadium: Dacia Arena; Attendance: 17,072; Referee: Luca Pairetto

2 April 2019 30	Milan	1–1	Udinese	Milan
19:00 CEST (UTC+02:00)	Piątek 44'	Report	Lasagna 65'	Stadium: San Siro; Attendance: 49,665; Referee: Luca Banti

7 April 2019 31	Udinese	3–2	Empoli	Udine
15:00 CEST (UTC+02:00)	Samir (yellow card) 10'; De Paul 15', 41' (pen.); Mandragora 45', (yellow card) 87'; Zeegelaar (yellow card) 58' (yellow-red card) 63'	Report	Caputo 11', (yellow card) 90+2'; Pajač (yellow card) 18'; Krunić 24'; Maietta (yellow card) 40'; Silvestre (yellow card) 44'	Stadium: Dacia Arena; Attendance: 22,537; Referee: Daniele Orsato

13 April 2019 32	Roma	1–0	Udinese	Rome
18:00 CEST (UTC+02:00)	Juan Jesus (yellow card) 38'; Džeko 67', (yellow card) 81'	Report	D'Alessandro (yellow card) 59'; Musso (yellow card) 63'; Troost-Ekong (yellow card) 77'	Stadium: Stadio Olimpico; Attendance: 34,449; Referee: Marco Di Bello

17 April 2019 25	Lazio	2–0	Udinese	Rome
19:00 CEST (UTC+02:00)	Caicedo 21'; Sandro 24' (o.g.); Luiz Felipe (yellow card) 28'; Lucas (yellow card) 78'	Report		Stadium: Stadio Olimpico; Attendance: 30,162; Referee: Gianpaolo Calvarese
Note: Match originally scheduled for 25 February 2019.

20 April 2019 33	Udinese	1–1	Sassuolo	Udine
15:00 CEST (UTC+02:00)	Mandragora (yellow card) 14'; Sandro (yellow card) 28'; Stryger Larsen (yellow card) 71'; Lirola 80' (o.g.)	Report	Demiral (yellow card) 25'; Sensi 31'; Locatelli (yellow card) 79'	Stadium: Dacia Arena; Attendance: 22,343; Referee: Luca Pairetto

29 April 2019 34	Atalanta	2–0	Udinese	Bergamo
19:00 CEST (UTC+02:00)	De Roon 82' (pen.); Pašalić 85'	Report	Zeegelaar (yellow card) 55'; Samir (yellow card) 63'	Stadium: Stadio Atleti Azzurri d'Italia; Attendance: 18,663; Referee: Piero Giacomelli

4 May 2019 35	Udinese	0–0	Internazionale	Udine
20:30 CEST (UTC+02:00)	Sandro (yellow card) 13'	Report	D'Ambrosio (yellow card) 15'; Valero (yellow card) 40'; Brozović (yellow card) 66'	Stadium: Dacia Arena; Attendance: 24,741; Referee: Gianluca Rocchi

12 May 2019 36	Frosinone	1–3	Udinese	Frosinone
15:00 CEST (UTC+02:00)	Ariaudo (yellow card) 41'; Ciano (yellow card) 52'; Dionisi 85'	Report	Okaka 11', 45', (yellow card) 31'; Samir 41', (yellow card) 90'; Sandro (yellow card) 54'	Stadium: Stadio Benito Stirpe; Attendance: 12,261; Referee: Fabrizio Pasqua

18 May 2019 37	Udinese	3–2	SPAL	Udine
15:00 CEST (UTC+02:00)	Samir 6', (yellow card) 45'; Zeegelaar (yellow card) 28'; Okaka 32', 35'; Mandragora (yellow card) 67'; De Paul (yellow card) 83'	Report	Vicari (yellow card) 5'; Fares (yellow card) 39'; Petagna 53'; Valoti 59'; Kurtić (yellow card) 72'; Janković (yellow card) 75'	Stadium: Dacia Arena; Attendance: 24,614; Referee: Michael Fabbri

26 May 2019 38	Cagliari	1–2	Udinese	Cagliari
20:30 CEST (UTC+02:00)	Pavoletti 17'; Srna (yellow card) 64'; Klavan (yellow card) 84'	Report	Hallfreðsson 59'; De Maio 69'; Musso (yellow card) 84'; Wilmot (yellow card) 88'	Stadium: Sardegna Arena; Attendance: 15,378; Referee: Manuel Volpi

=== Coppa Italia ===
11 August 2018 Third round	Udinese	1–2 (a.e.t.)	Benevento	Udine
20:00 CEST (UTC+02:00)	Machís 6'; Mandragora (yellow card) 25'	Report	Nocerino (yellow card) 45'; Viola 68', (yellow card) 74'; Tello 104'	Stadium: Dacia Arena; Attendance: 15,141; Referee: Piero Giacomelli

== Statistics ==
=== Appearances and goals ===
No.	Pos	Nat	Player	Total		Serie A		Coppa Italia	
No.	Pos	Nat	Player	Apps	Goals	Apps	Goals	Apps	Goals
Goalkeepers
1	GK	(Argentina) ARG	Juan Musso	29	0	29	0	0	0
27	GK	(Italy) ITA	Samuele Perisan	0	0	0	0	0	0
88	GK	(Brazil) BRA	Nícolas	1	0	0	0	1	0
Defenders
3	DF	(Brazil) BRA	Samir	22	2	21	2	1	0
4	DF	(Ghana) GHA	Nicholas Opoku	12	0	9+3	0	0	0
5	DF	(Nigeria) NGA	William Troost-Ekong	35	0	35	0	0	0
17	DF	(Netherlands) NED	Bram Nuytinck	27	0	24+3	0	0	0
18	DF	(Netherlands) NED	Hidde ter Avest	14	0	12+1	0	0+1	0
19	DF	(Denmark) DEN	Jens Stryger Larsen	37	1	36	1	1	0
24	DF	(England) ENG	Ben Wilmot	5	0	2+3	0	0	0
79	DF	(Italy) ITA	Gabriele Angella	0	0	0	0	0	0
87	DF	(France) FRA	Sebastian De Maio	16	1	13+3	1	0	0
90	DF	(Netherlands) NED	Marvin Zeegelaar	12	0	10+2	0	0	0
Midfielders
6	MF	(Ivory Coast) CIV	Seko Fofana	32	2	31	2	1	0
8	MF	(Ghana) GHA	Emmanuel Agyemang-Badu	4	0	2+2	0	0	0
11	MF	(Switzerland) SUI	Valon Behrami	19	1	17+2	1	0	0
13	MF	(Sweden) SWE	Svante Ingelsson	3	0	1+2	0	0	0
14	MF	(Serbia) SRB	Petar Mićin	1	0	0+1	0	0	0
30	MF	(Brazil) BRA	Sandro	12	0	7+5	0	0	0
38	MF	(Italy) ITA	Rolando Mandragora	36	3	33+2	3	1	0
72	MF	(Czech Republic) CZE	Antonín Barák	9	0	4+4	0	1	0
77	MF	(Italy) ITA	Marco D'Alessandro	24	0	16+8	0	0	0
Forwards
7	FW	(Italy) ITA	Stefano Okaka	16	6	11+5	6	0	0
10	FW	(Argentina) ARG	Rodrigo De Paul	37	9	36	9	1	0
15	FW	(Italy) ITA	Kevin Lasagna	37	6	26+10	6	1	0
23	FW	(Argentina) ARG	Ignacio Pussetto	36	4	24+11	4	0+1	0
91	FW	(Poland) POL	Łukasz Teodorczyk	16	1	2+14	1	0	0
Players transferred out during the season
2	DF	(Mali) MLI	Molla Wagué	3	0	1+1	0	1	0
7	DF	(Italy) ITA	Giuseppe Pezzella	5	0	2+2	0	1	0
9	FW	(Brazil) BRA	Felipe Vizeu	5	0	0+5	0	0	0
16	FW	(Venezuela) VEN	Darwin Machís	14	1	4+9	0	1	1
22	GK	(Italy) ITA	Simone Scuffet	9	0	9	0	0	0
53	DF	(Iraq) IRQ	Ali Adnan Kadhim	1	0	0	0	0+1	0
98	MF	(Senegal) SEN	Mamadou Coulibaly	0	0	0	0	0	0
99	MF	(Croatia) CRO	Andrija Balić	5	0	0+4	0	0+1	0

Last updated: 26 May 2019
Source: Competitions

=== Goalscorers ===
Rank	No.	Pos	Nat	Name	Serie A	Coppa Italia	Total
1	10	FW	(Argentina)	Rodrigo De Paul	9	0	9
2	7	FW	(Italy)	Stefano Okaka	6	0	6
2	15	FW	(Italy)	Kevin Lasagna	6	0	6
4	23	FW	(Argentina)	Ignacio Pussetto	4	0	4
5	38	MF	(Italy)	Rolando Mandragora	3	0	3
6	3	DF	(Brazil)	Samir	2	0	2
6	6	MF	(France)	Seko Fofana	2	0	2
8	11	MF	(Switzerland)	Valon Behrami	1	0	1
8	16	FW	(Venezuela)	Darwin Machís	0	1	1
8	19	DF	(Denmark)	Jens Stryger Larsen	1	0	1
8	20	MF	(Iceland)	Emil Hallfreðsson	1	0	1
8	87	DF	(France)	Sebastian De Maio	1	0	1
8	91	FW	(Poland)	Łukasz Teodorczyk	1	0	1
Own goal					2	0	2
Totals					39	1	40

Last updated: 26 May 2019

=== Clean sheets ===
Rank	No.	Pos	Nat	Name	Serie A	Coppa Italia	Total
1	1	GK	(Argentina)	Juan Musso	7	0	7
2	22	GK	(Italy)	Simone Scuffet	2	0	2
Totals					9	0	9

Last updated: 26 May 2019

=== Disciplinary record ===
No.	Pos	Nat	Name	Serie A			Coppa Italia			Total		
No.	Pos	Nat	Name	Booked	(yellow card) (yellow-red card)	Sent off (straight red)	Booked	(yellow card) (yellow-red card)	Sent off (straight red)	Booked	(yellow card) (yellow-red card)	Sent off (straight red)
1	GK	(Argentina)	Juan Musso	4	0	0	0	0	0	4	0	0
3	DF	(Brazil)	Samir	7	0	0	0	0	0	7	0	0
4	DF	(Ghana)	Nicholas Opoku	5	0	0	0	0	0	5	0	0
5	DF	(Nigeria)	William Troost-Ekong	4	0	0	0	0	0	4	0	0
7	DF	(Italy)	Giuseppe Pezzella	1	0	0	0	0	0	1	0	0
17	DF	(Netherlands)	Bram Nuytinck	4	0	1	0	0	0	4	0	1
19	DF	(Denmark)	Jens Stryger Larsen	6	0	0	0	0	0	6	0	0
24	DF	(England)	Ben Wilmot	1	0	0	0	0	0	1	0	0
87	DF	(France)	Sebastian De Maio	0	1	0	0	0	0	0	1	0
90	DF	(Netherlands)	Marvin Zeegelaar	5	1	0	0	0	0	5	1	0
6	MF	(France)	Seko Fofana	5	0	0	0	0	0	5	0	0
11	MF	(Switzerland)	Valon Behrami	6	0	0	0	0	0	6	0	0
30	MF	(Brazil)	Sandro	5	0	0	0	0	0	5	0	0
38	MF	(Italy)	Rolando Mandragora	8	0	1	1	0	0	9	0	1
77	MF	(Italy)	Marco D'Alessandro	3	0	0	0	0	0	3	0	0
7	FW	(Italy)	Stefano Okaka	4	0	0	0	0	0	4	0	0
10	FW	(Argentina)	Rodrigo De Paul	7	0	0	0	0	0	7	0	0
15	FW	(Italy)	Kevin Lasagna	2	0	0	0	0	0	2	0	0
16	FW	(Venezuela)	Darwin Machís	2	0	0	0	0	0	2	0	0
23	FW	(Argentina)	Ignacio Pussetto	8	0	0	0	0	0	8	0	0
91	FW	(Poland)	Łukasz Teodorczyk	1	0	0	0	0	0	1	0	0
Totals				88	2	2	1	0	0	89	2	2

Last updated: 26 May 2019
