= Samuele Perisan =

Italian footballer (born 1997)

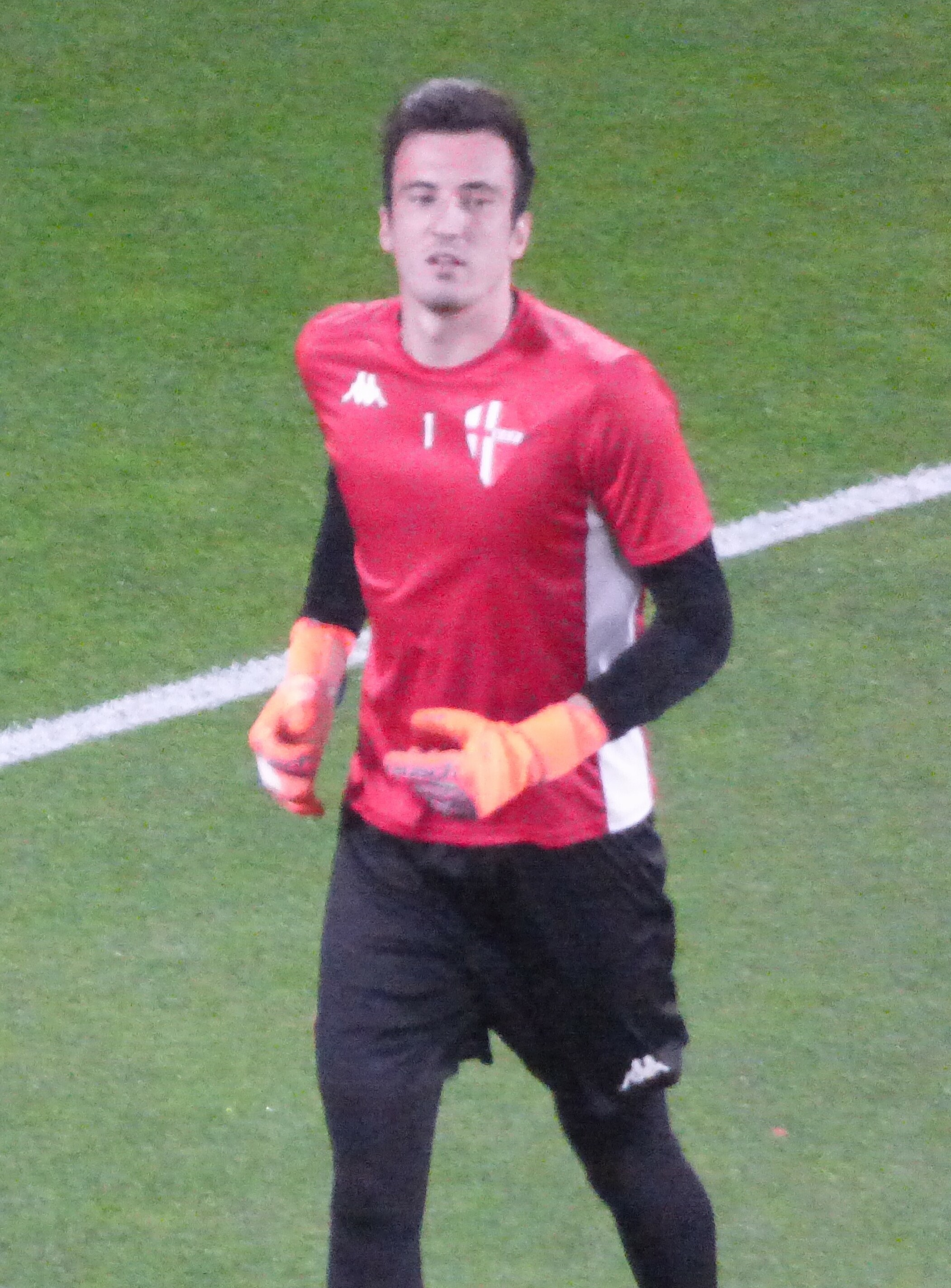
- Perisan with Padova in 2018

Personal information
- Date of birth: 21 August 1997 (age 29)
- Place of birth: San Vito al Tagliamento, Italy
- Height: 1.92 m (6 ft 4 in)
- Position: Goalkeeper

Team information
- Current team: Empoli
- Number: 1

Youth career
- 2007–2017: Udinese

Senior career*
Years	Team	Apps	(Gls)
2016–2020	Udinese	0	(0)
2017–2018	→ Triestina (loan)	5	(0)
2018	→ Arezzo (loan)	12	(0)
2018–2019	→ Padova (loan)	5	(0)
2020–2022	Pordenone	67	(0)
2022–	Empoli	8	(0)
2025	→ Sampdoria (loan)	1	(0)

International career
2014	Italy U18	1	(0)
2017	Italy U20	2	(0)
Medal record
Men's Football
Representing Italy
FIFA U-20 World Cup
Third place	2017 South Korea
- * Club domestic league appearances and goals as of 13 May 2025

Samuele Perisan (born 21 August 1997) is an Italian professional footballer who plays as a goalkeeper for Serie B club Empoli.

== Club career ==
Born in San Vito al Tagliamento, a town belonging to the province of Pordenone, Perisan joined the youth sector of fellow Friulian club Udinese and came through its youth ranks in 2016, when he became the club's third-choice goalkeeper behind Orestis Karnezis and Simone Scuffet.

One year later, Perisan obtained his first opportunity as a professional player, thanks to a loan at Triestina until the end of the year: he later made his Serie C debut on 10 September 2017, in a game against Ravenna. In January 2018, he stayed in the third tier as Udinese decided to arrange a new loan, this time at Arezzo, where the keeper managed to gain more playing time.

In the following summer, he was sent on loan once more, joining Padova for one season. However, on 16 January 2019, his spell was terminated early by mutual consent and he returned to Udinese, where he went on serving as a third-choice goalkeeper again (this time behind Juan Musso and Nícolas) for the rest of the 2018-19 season, as well as the 2019-20 season, although he never registered a single appearance for the Friulian team.

On 5 October 2020, he agreed a permanent move to Pordenone and signed a three-year contract. Although the team went through a fluctuating season, as they finished in fifteenth place in Serie B, Perisan broke out as one of the league's most consistent goalkeepers, having collected 13 clean sheets in 35 appearances and even being deemed as Player of the Month in January 2021. His performances gained him a one-year extension of his contract with Pordenone at the end of the season.

On 23 June 2022, Perisan signed a three-year contract with Serie A club Empoli. On 30 January 2025, he was loaned to Sampdoria in Serie B.

== International career ==
Perisan represented Italy at youth level, featuring in their under-18 and under-20 sides.

In May 2017, he was included in the Italian under-20 squad that would take part in the 2017 FIFA U-20 World Cup, being the third-choice goalkeeper behind Andrea Zaccagno and Alessandro Plizzari. The Azzurri eventually finished third in the competition.

== Career statistics ==
As of match played 1 February 2025

Appearances and goals by club, season and competition
Club	Season	League			National Cup		Europe		Other		Total	
Club	Season	Division	Apps	Goals	Apps	Goals	Apps	Goals	Apps	Goals	Apps	Goals
Udinese	2014–15	Serie A	0	0	—		—		—		0	0
Udinese	2015–16	Serie A	0	0	0	0	—		—		0	0
Udinese	2016–17	Serie A	0	0	0	0	—		—		0	0
Udinese	2018–19	Serie A	0	0	—		—		—		0	0
Udinese	2019–20	Serie A	0	0	0	0	—		—		0	0
Udinese	Total		0	0	0	0	—		—		0	0
Triestina (loan)	2017–18	Serie C	5	0	3 (Note: Appearances in Coppa Italia Serie C)	0	—		—		8	0
Arezzo (loan)	2017–18	Serie C	12	0	—		—		—		12	0
Padova (loan)	2018–19	Serie B	5	0	0	0	—		—		5	0
Pordenone	2020–21	Serie B	35	0	0	0	—		—		35	0
Pordenone	2021–22	Serie B	32	0	1	0	—		—		33	0
Pordenone	Total		67	0	1	0	—		—		68	0
Empoli	2022–23	Serie A	7	0	0	0	—		—		7	0
Empoli	2023–24	Serie A	1	0	0	0	—		—		1	0
Empoli	2024–25	Serie A	0	0	0	0	—		—		1	0
Empoli	Total		8	0	0	0	—		—		8	0
Sampdoria (loan)	2024–25	Serie B	1	0	—		—		—		1	0
Career total			98	0	4	0	0	0	0	0	102	0

== Honours ==
Italy U20

- FIFA U-20 World Cup third place: 2017
