= Rodrigo De Paul =

Argentine footballer (born 1994)

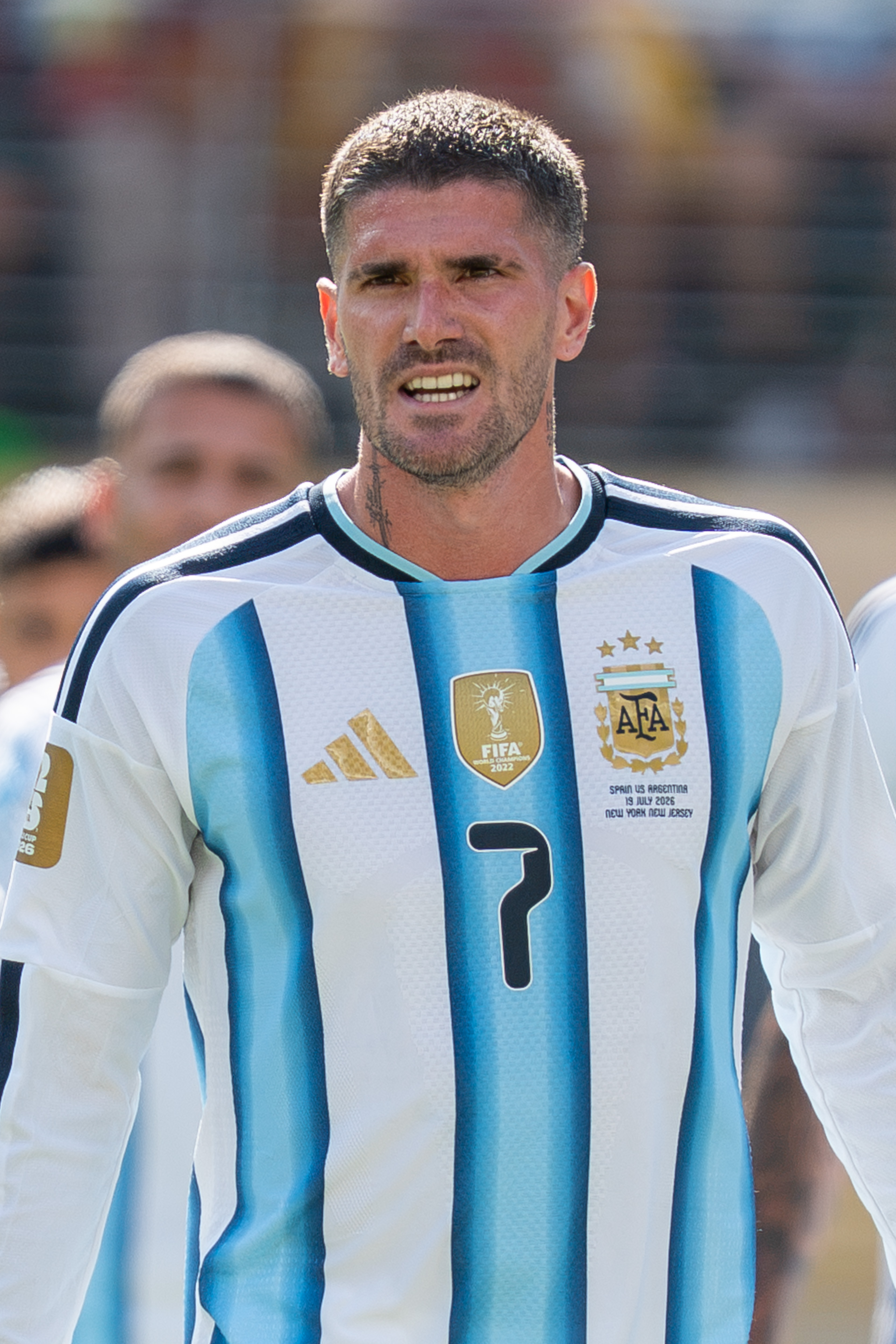
- De Paul with Argentina in 2026

Personal information
- Full name: Rodrigo Javier De Paul
- Date of birth: 24 May 1994 (age 32)
- Place of birth: Sarandí, Buenos Aires, Argentina
- Height: 1.80 m (5 ft 11 in)
- Position: Midfielder

Team information
- Current team: Inter Miami
- Number: 7

Youth career
- 2002–2012: Racing Club

Senior career*
| Years | Team | Apps | (Gls) |
| 2012–2014 | Racing Club | 54 | (6) |
| 2014–2016 | Valencia | 34 | (1) |
| 2016 | → Racing Club (loan) | 11 | (0) |
| 2016–2021 | Udinese | 177 | (33) |
| 2021–2025 | Atlético Madrid | 134 | (11) |
| 2025 | → Inter Miami (loan) | 11 | (0) |
| 2026– | Inter Miami | 29 | (6) |

International career^{‡}
| 2018– | Argentina | 95 | (2) |
Medal record
Men's football
Representing Argentina
FIFA World Cup
| Winner | 2022 Qatar |
| Runner-up | 2026 Canada–Mexico–US |
Copa América
| Winner | 2021 Brazil |
| Winner | 2024 United States |
| Third place | 2019 Brazil |
CONMEBOL–UEFA Cup of Champions
| Winner | 2022 England |
- * Club domestic league appearances and goals as of 23:59, 7 November 2026 (UTC) ‡ National team caps and goals as of 6 October 2026 (UTC)

Rodrigo Javier De Paul (Spanish pronunciation: [roˈðɾiɣo ðe pol]; born 24 May 1994) is an Argentine professional footballer who plays as a midfielder for Major League Soccer club Inter Miami and the Argentina national team.

De Paul started his career at Racing Club in Argentina before moving to Valencia in Spain in 2014. In 2016, he signed with Udinese in Italy before returning to Spain with Atlético Madrid in 2021. He was named in the team of the year for the 2024–25 La Liga season. He then moved to the United States to join Inter Miami in 2025.

He made his senior international debut in 2018. He was part of the Argentina squads for the 2018, 2022, and 2026 World Cups, winning the 2022 edition where he started in the final. He was also part of the squads at the 2019, 2021, and 2024 Copa Américas, winning the latter two and being named in the teams of the tournament.

== Club career ==
=== Racing Club ===
Born in Sarandí, Buenos Aires, De Paul joined Racing Club's youth setup in 2002, aged eight. He was called up to the main squad on 24 June 2012, while still a junior, for a match against Vélez Sarsfield, but remained unused in the 1–2 home loss.

On 10 February 2013, De Paul played his first match as a professional, replacing Mauro Camoranesi in the 86th minute of a 0–3 loss at Atlético de Rafaela. He scored his first goal a month later, netting the last through a long-range shot in a 3–0 win at San Martín de San Juan.

De Paul appeared in 19 matches during the 2012–13 campaign. He then played a key part in 2013–14, featuring in 35 matches and scoring four times.

=== Valencia ===
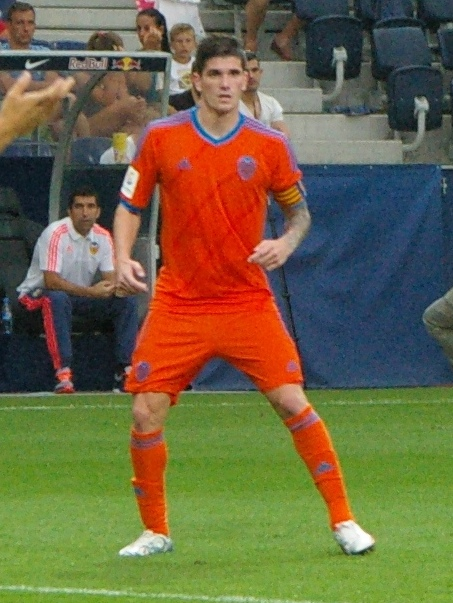
De Paul with Valencia in 2015

On 9 May 2014, it was announced that Valencia CF agreed to a US$6.5 million deal for De Paul with Racing. He signed a five-year deal with Los Che on 6 June, and made his La Liga debut on 23 August under head coach Nuno Espírito Santo, replacing Paco Alcácer in the 65th minute in a 1–1 away draw against Sevilla FC, but being sent off just one minute later due to fouling Aleix Vidal.

He scored his first goal for the club on 4 December 2014 in the 2–1 win against Rayo Vallecano in the Copa del Rey. He followed this up with his first La Liga goal on 9 April 2015 against Athletic Bilbao, making 29 appearances in all competitions during his first season at the club.

After making 14 appearances in all competitions during the first half of the 2015–16 season, including two in the Champions League. On 4 February 2016, he was loaned out by then Valencia manager Gary Neville to his former side Racing Club. He scored his first and only goal in a victory against Bolívar on 24 February in the Copa Libertadores.

=== Udinese ===
On 20 July 2016, De Paul was transferred to Italian Serie A club Udinese. He made his debut on 20 August 2016 against AS Roma in a 4–0 defeat. He scored his first goal for the club on 29 January 2017 against AC Milan in a 2–1 victory. He started the 2018–19 season with four goals in the first six matches of the Serie A season. He would finish the season as Udinese top goal scorer with nine goals during the 2018–19 Udinese Calcio season and also nine assists. On 15 October 2019, De Paul signed a new five-year contract at Udinese. He would score seven goals and gain six assists for Udinese in Serie A during the 2019–20 season. De Paul became Udinese's club captain in December 2020, replacing Kevin Lasagna.

=== Atlético Madrid ===
On 12 July 2021, De Paul signed a five-year contract with Atlético Madrid. He joined his new club just days after winning the Copa América with Argentina. On 7 December 2021, he scored his first goal for the club in a 3–1 away win against FC Porto in the final group game of the 2021–22 UEFA Champions League.

=== Inter Miami ===
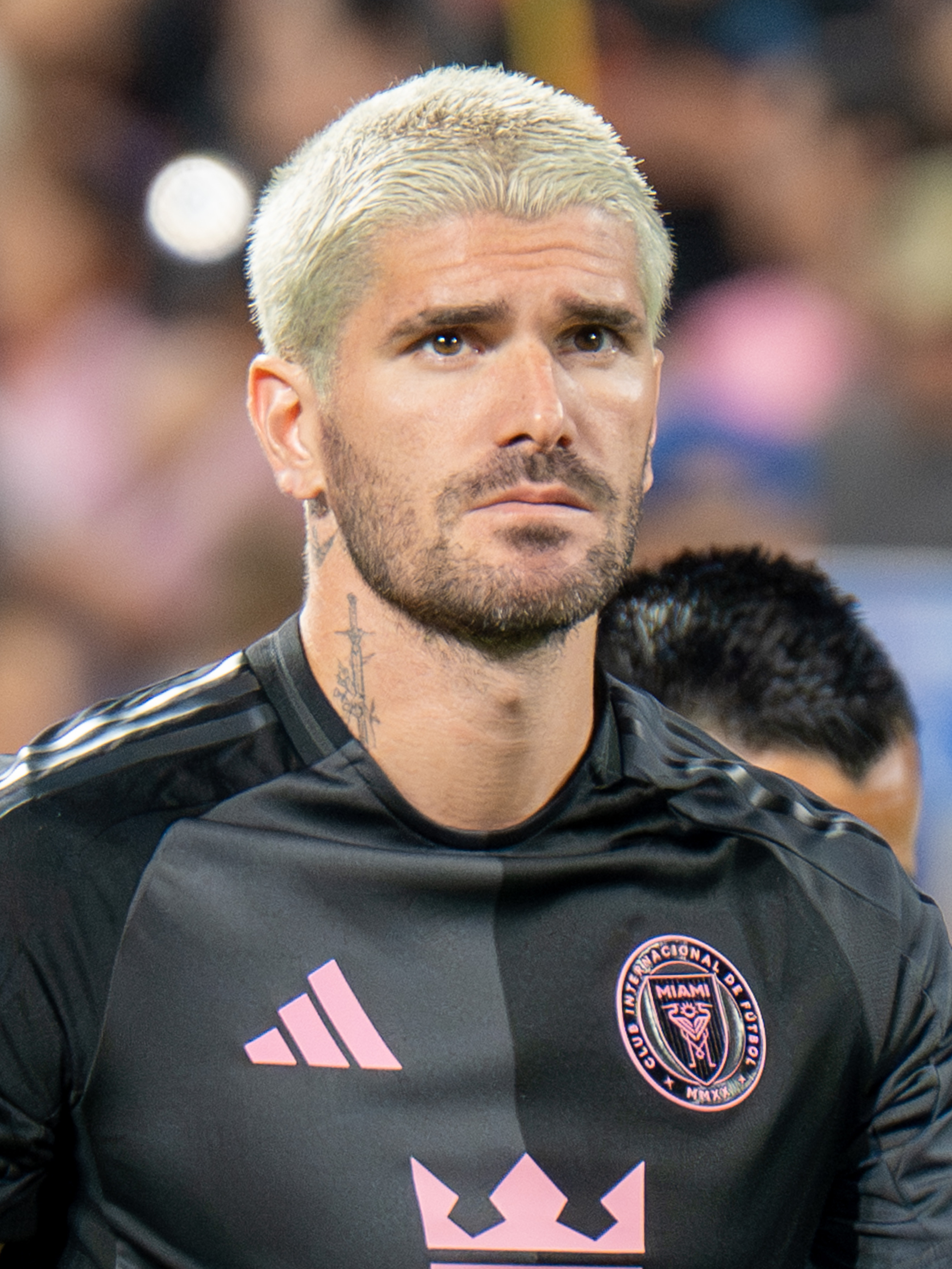
De Paul with Inter Miami in 2025

On 25 July 2025, De Paul joined Major League Soccer club Inter Miami on an initial six-month loan from Atlético Madrid, with a mandatory purchase clause worth €15 million plus potential bonuses. He is expected to sign a four-year deal through 2029 once the move becomes permanent. A month later, on 6 August, he scored his first goal for the club in a 3–1 win over Pumas UNAM during the 2025 Leagues Cup league phase.

== International career ==
De Paul with Argentina at the 2026 FIFA World Cup

De Paul made his senior international debut for Argentina in a 4–0 victory against Iraq on 11 October 2018, and later became a regular under manager Lionel Scaloni; he was part of the Argentina squad that finished third in the Copa América 2019 after beating Chile 2–1 in the third-place match.

On 3 July 2021, De Paul scored the opening goal in a 3–0 win over Ecuador in the quarter-finals of the 2021 Copa América in Brazil. In the final of the tournament against the hosts Brazil, De Paul's long pass set up Ángel Di María to score the only goal of the match, allowing Argentina to capture their joint record 15th Copa América title and their first major international title since 2008.

On 10 October 2021, De Paul scored a goal in the 2022 FIFA World Cup qualification (CONMEBOL), in a 3–0 win over Uruguay.

He was also part of the squad that won the 2022 FIFA World Cup and the 2024 Copa América.

On 27 May 2026, De Paul was selected in the 26-man squad for the 2026 FIFA World Cup.

On 6 October 2026, De Paul played in Lionel Messi's farewell match for Argentina, which may also be his last match for the national team, after rumours surfaced he is not in the plans to be called again by Lionel Scaloni, the head coach of Argentina.

== Personal life ==
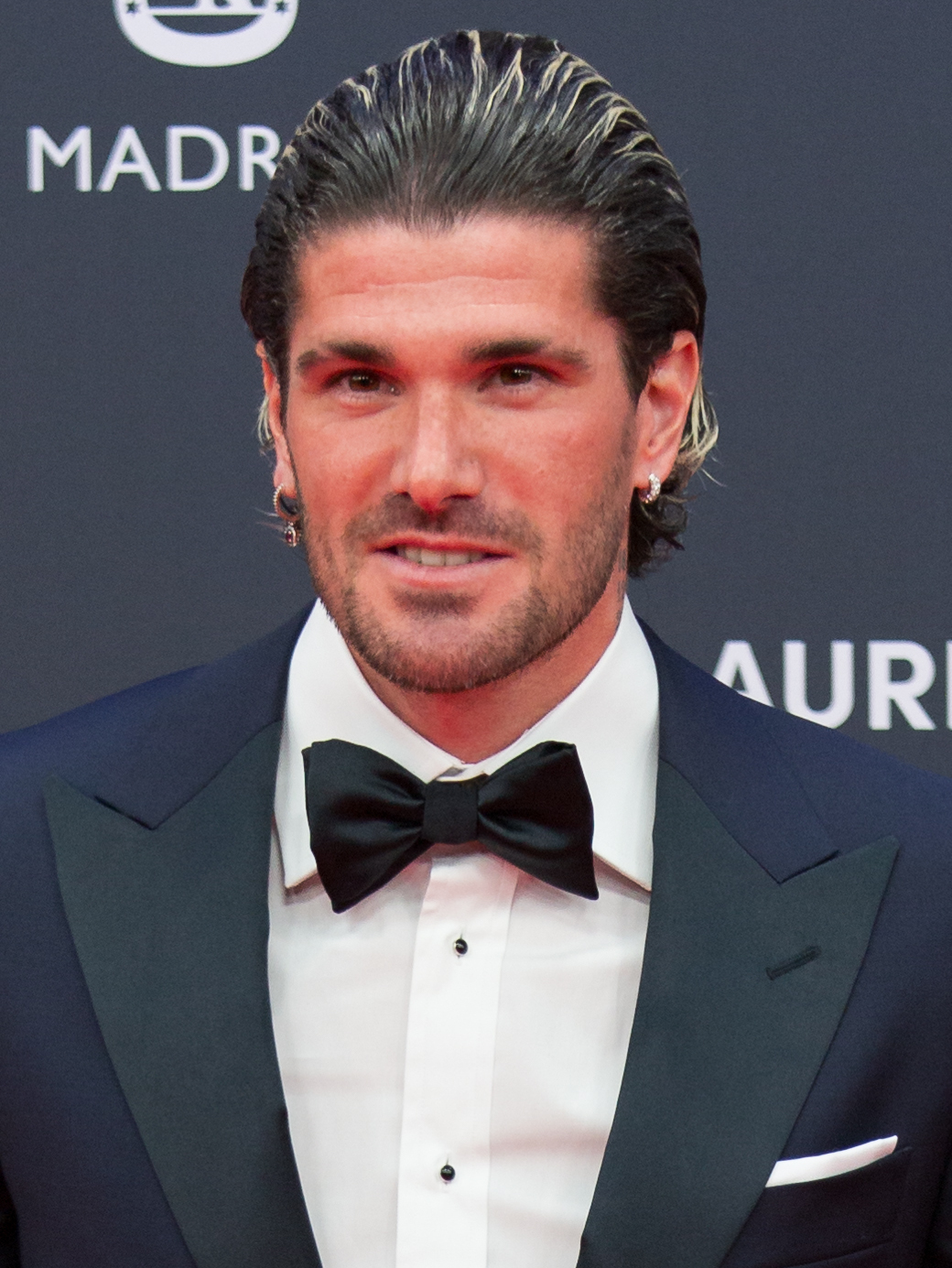
De Paul at the Laureus World Sports Awards in 2024

Rodrigo's mother Mónica Ferraroti is of Italian descent, which earned him Italian citizenship. She worked as the treasurer of the local football club Deportivo Belgrano de Sarandí, which De Paul joined at the age of three. After the divorce of his parents, De Paul was raised by his paternal grandfather Osvaldo De Paul, whom he acknowledges as the key influence on his upbringing.

De Paul was in a relationship with Argentine model Camila Homs for twelve years. They have two children together. In January 2022, the couple confirmed that they were separated. De Paul dated Argentine singer Tini from August 2021 to August 2023 and again since 2025.

== Career statistics ==
=== Club ===
As of match played 21 November 2026

Appearances and goals by club, season and competition
| Club | Season | League | | | National cup (Note: Includes Copa Argentina, Copa del Rey, Coppa Italia) | | Continental | | Other | | Total | |
| Club | Season | Division | Apps | Goals | Apps | Goals | Apps | Goals | Apps | Goals | Apps | Goals |
|---|---|---|---|---|---|---|---|---|---|---|---|---|
| Racing | 2012–13 | Argentine Primera División | 19 | 2 | 1 | 0 | 0 | 0 | — | | 20 | 2 |
| Racing | 2013–14 | Argentine Primera División | 35 | 4 | 0 | 0 | 2 (Note: Appearances in Copa Sudamericana) | 0 | — | | 37 | 4 |
| Racing | Total | | 54 | 6 | 1 | 0 | 2 | 0 | — | | 57 | 6 |
| Valencia | 2014–15 | La Liga | 25 | 1 | 4 | 1 | — | | — | | 29 | 2 |
| Valencia | 2015–16 | La Liga | 9 | 0 | 3 | 0 | 3 (Note: Appearances in UEFA Champions League) | 0 | — | | 15 | 0 |
| Valencia | Total | | 34 | 1 | 7 | 1 | 3 | 0 | — | | 44 | 2 |
| Racing (loan) | 2016 | Argentine Primera División | 11 | 0 | 1 | 0 | 3 (Note: Appearances in Copa Libertadores) | 1 | — | | 15 | 1 |
| Udinese | 2016–17 | Serie A | 34 | 4 | 1 | 1 | — | | — | | 35 | 5 |
| Udinese | 2017–18 | Serie A | 37 | 4 | 2 | 0 | — | | — | | 39 | 4 |
| Udinese | 2018–19 | Serie A | 36 | 9 | 1 | 0 | — | | — | | 37 | 9 |
| Udinese | 2019–20 | Serie A | 34 | 7 | 1 | 0 | — | | — | | 35 | 7 |
| Udinese | 2020–21 | Serie A | 36 | 9 | 2 | 0 | — | | — | | 38 | 9 |
| Udinese | Total | | 177 | 33 | 7 | 1 | — | | — | | 184 | 34 |
| Atlético Madrid | 2021–22 | La Liga | 36 | 3 | 2 | 0 | 9 | 1 | 1 (Note: Appearance in Supercopa de España) | 0 | 48 | 4 |
| Atlético Madrid | 2022–23 | La Liga | 30 | 2 | 3 | 0 | 5 | 1 | — | | 38 | 3 |
| Atlético Madrid | 2023–24 | La Liga | 34 | 3 | 5 | 0 | 8 | 1 | 1 | 0 | 48 | 4 |
| Atlético Madrid | 2024–25 | La Liga | 34 | 3 | 6 | 0 | 10 | 0 | 3 (Note: Appearances in FIFA Club World Cup) | 0 | 53 | 3 |
| Atlético Madrid | Total | | 134 | 11 | 16 | 0 | 32 | 3 | 5 | 0 | 187 | 14 |
| Inter Miami (loan) | 2025 | Major League Soccer | 11 | 0 | — | | — | | 12 (Note: Six appearances and one goal in Leagues Cup, six appearances and one goal in MLS Cup playoffs) | 2 | 23 | 2 |
| Inter Miami | 2026 | Major League Soccer | 29 | 6 | — | | 2 (Note: Appearances in CONCACAF Champions Cup) | 0 | 5 (Note: Three appearances and one goal in Leagues Cup, one appearance in Campeones Cup, one appearance in MLS Cup playoffs) | 1 | 36 | 7 |
| Inter Miami | Inter Miami total | | 40 | 6 | — | | 2 | 0 | 17 | 3 | 59 | 9 |
| Career total | | | 450 | 57 | 32 | 2 | 42 | 4 | 22 | 3 | 546 | 66 |

=== International ===
As of match played 6 October 2026

Appearances and goals by national team and year
| National team | Year | Apps | Goals |
|---|---|---|---|
| Argentina | 2018 | 3 | 0 |
| Argentina | 2019 | 14 | 0 |
| Argentina | 2020 | 4 | 0 |
| Argentina | 2021 | 15 | 2 |
| Argentina | 2022 | 15 | 0 |
| Argentina | 2023 | 9 | 0 |
| Argentina | 2024 | 15 | 0 |
| Argentina | 2025 | 8 | 0 |
| Argentina | 2026 | 12 | 0 |
| Total | | 95 | 2 |

Scores and results list Argentina's goal tally first, score column indicates score after each De Paul goal.

List of international goals scored by Rodrigo De Paul
| No. | Date | Venue | Opponent | Score | Result | Competition |
|---|---|---|---|---|---|---|
| 1 | 3 July 2021 | Estádio Olímpico Pedro Ludovico, Goiânia, Brazil | Ecuador | 1–0 | 3–0 | 2021 Copa América |
| 2 | 10 October 2021 | Estadio Monumental, Buenos Aires, Argentina | Uruguay | 2–0 | 3–0 | 2022 FIFA World Cup qualification |

== Honours ==
Inter Miami

- MLS Cup: 2025
- Campeones Cup: 2026

Argentina

- FIFA World Cup: 2022
- Copa América: 2021, 2024
- CONMEBOL–UEFA Cup of Champions: 2022

Individual

- Copa América Team of the Tournament: 2021, 2024
- IFFHS Team of the Copa América: 2021
- IFFHS Men's CONMEBOL Team: 2021, 2022
- La Liga Team of the Season: 2024–25
- MLS All-Star: 2026
