= Molla Wagué =

Footballer (born 1991)

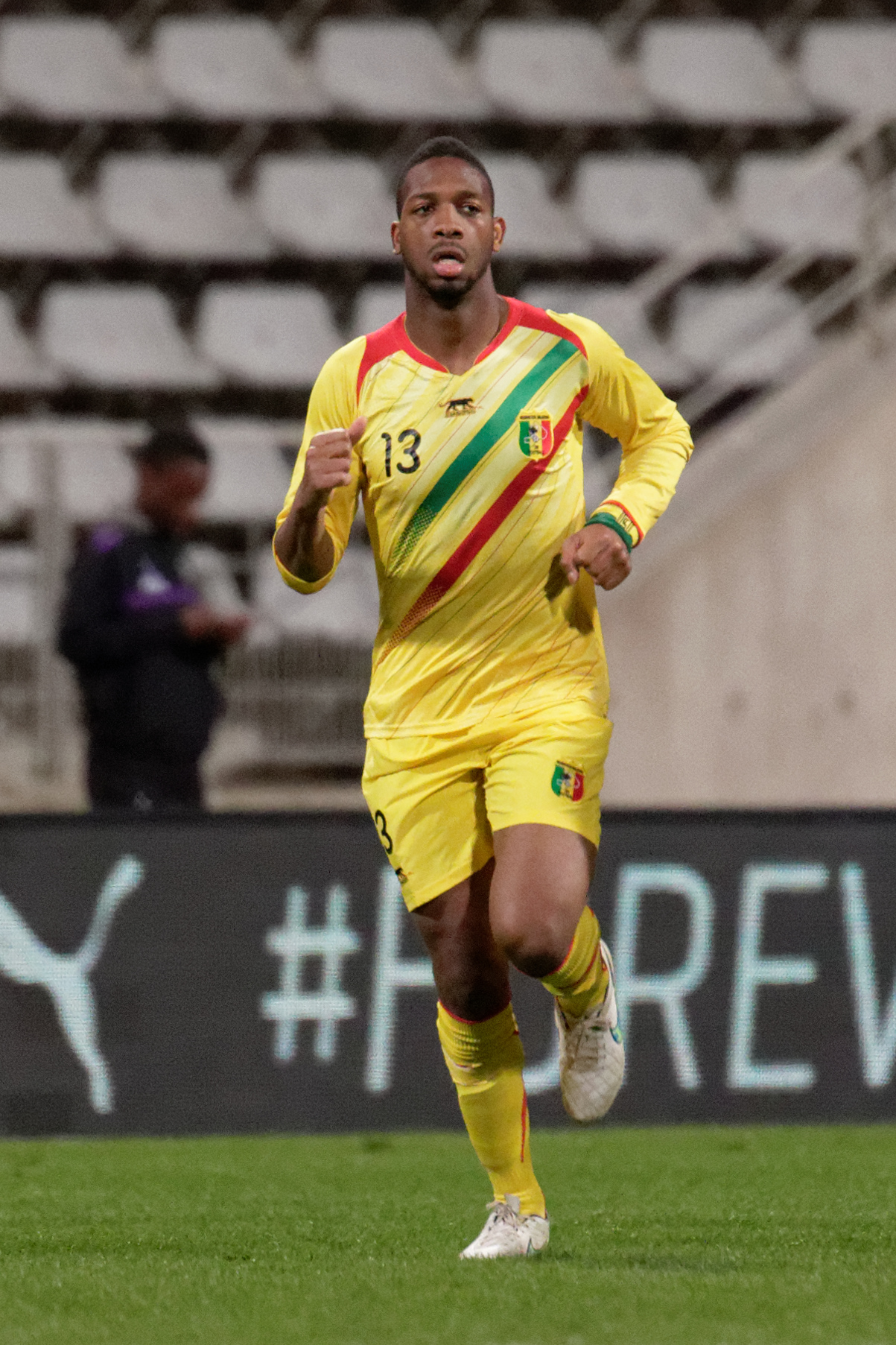
- Wagué with Mali in 2015

Personal information
- Date of birth: 21 February 1991 (age 35)
- Place of birth: Vernon, France
- Height: 1.91 m (6 ft 3 in)
- Position: Centre back

Youth career
- 1998–2004: Les Andelys
- 2004–2005: Romilly Pont Saint-Pierre
- 2005–2006: Rouen
- 2006–2011: Caen

Senior career*
Years	Team	Apps	(Gls)
2010–2014	Caen B	51	(2)
2011–2014	Caen	49	(4)
2014–2017	Granada	0	(0)
2014–2017	→ Udinese (loan)	37	(2)
2017	→ Leicester City (loan)	0	(0)
2017–2019	Udinese	3	(0)
2017–2018	→ Watford (loan)	6	(1)
2019	→ Nottingham Forest (loan)	11	(3)
2019–2022	Nantes	9	(0)
2020–2021	→ Amiens (loan)	24	(1)
2022	Seraing	4	(0)

International career^{‡}
2009	France U19	1	(0)
2013–2019	Mali	39	(4)
Medal record
Men's football
Representing Mali
Africa Cup of Nations
Third place	2013 South Africa
- * Club domestic league appearances and goals as of 05:56, 30 January 2022 (UTC) ‡ National team caps and goals as of 10:36, 30 July 2020 (UTC)

Molla Wagué (born 21 February 1991) is a professional footballer who plays as a centre back. Born in France, he represented the country at U19 youth level before switching to the Mali senior national team.

== Club career ==
Wagué started his professional career with French club SM Caen. He made his professional debut on 6 November 2011 in a 3–0 league victory against Dijon. Two weeks later, in his first professional start, he scored his first professional goal in a 2–2 draw with Ajaccio.

On 10 July 2014, he joined Serie A club Udinese on loan after signing a contract with Granada.

On 31 January 2017, Wagué joined Leicester City on loan from Udinese until the end of the season. The transfer was consented to by parent club Granada and included an option for Leicester to sign him permanently. He made his debut in an FA Cup defeat away at Millwall playing around 70 minutes before being replaced due to an injury which would result in him missing the rest of the season. Wagué then joined Udinese permanently before being loaned out to Watford on 31 August 2017.

On 1 February 2019, Wagué joined EFL Championship side Nottingham Forest on loan for the remainder of the season.

On 12 January 2022, Wagué signed for Belgian club Seraing until the end of the 2021–22 season. The contract was terminated on 7 February 2022 by mutual consent for personal reasons.

== International career ==
A former France youth international at the under-19 level, Wagué switched his allegiance to Mali and was a member of the Mali national team at the 2013 Africa Cup of Nations in South Africa.

== Career statistics ==
=== Club ===
As of 12 January 2022

Appearances and goals by club, season and competition
Club	Season	League			National cup		League cup		Other		Total	
Club	Season	Division	Apps	Goals	Apps	Goals	Apps	Goals	Apps	Goals	Apps	Goals
Caen B	2010–11	CFA	25	1	—		—		—		25	1
Caen B	2011–12	CFA	20	1	—		—		—		20	1
Caen B	2012–13	CFA	1	0	—		—		—		1	0
Caen B	2013–14	CFA	5	0	—		—		—		5	0
Caen B	Total		51	2	—		—		—		51	2
Caen	2011–12	Ligue 1	5	1	1	0	2	0	0	0	8	1
Caen	2012–13	Ligue 2	20	2	3	1	0	0	0	0	23	3
Caen	2013–14	Ligue 2	24	1	0	0	1	0	0	0	25	1
Caen	Total		49	4	4	1	3	0	0	0	56	5
Granada	2014–15	La Liga	0	0	0	0	—		0	0	0	0
Udinese	2014–15 (loan)	Serie A	10	2	0	0	—		0	0	10	2
Udinese	2015–16 (loan)	Serie A	21	0	0	0	—		0	0	21	0
Udinese	2016–17 (loan)	Serie A	6	0	0	0	—		0	0	6	0
Udinese	2017–18	Serie A	1	0	1	0	—		0	0	2	0
Udinese	2018–19	Serie A	2	0	1	0	—		0	0	3	0
Udinese	Total		40	2	2	0	—		0	0	42	2
Leicester City (loan)	2016–17	Premier League	0	0	1	0	0	0	0	0	1	0
Watford (loan)	2017–18	Premier League	6	1	0	0	0	0	—		6	1
Nottingham Forest (loan)	2017–18	EFL Championship	11	3	0	0	0	0	—		11	3
Nantes	2019–20	Ligue 1	9	0	1	0	1	0	—		11	0
Amiens (loan)	2020–21	Ligue 2	24	1	2	0	—		—		26	1
Seraing	2021–22	Belgian First Division A	0	0	0	0	—		0	0	0	0
Career total			190	13	10	1	4	0	0	0	204	14

=== International ===
As of match played on 17 November 2019

Appearances and goals by national team and year
National team	Year	Apps	Goals
Mali	2013	6	0
Mali	2014	1	0
Mali	2015	10	3
Mali	2016	4	1
Mali	2017	8	0
Mali	2018	1	0
Mali	2019	9	0
Total		39	4

Scores and results list Mali's goal tally first, score column indicates score after each Wagué goal.

List of international goals scored by Molla Wagué
No.	Date	Venue	Opponent	Score	Result	Competition
1	25 March 2015	Stade Pierre Brisson, Beauvais, France	Gabon	1–0	3–4	Friendly
2	25 March 2015	Stade Pierre Brisson, Beauvais, France	Gabon	2–1	3–4	Friendly
3	9 October 2015	Stade de l'Aube, Troyes, France	Burkina Faso	4–1	4–1	Friendly
4	28 March 2016	Estadio de Malabo, Malabo, Equatorial Guinea	Equatorial Guinea	1–0	1–0	2017 Africa Cup of Nations qualification

== Honours ==
Mali

- Africa Cup of Nations bronze: 2013
