= Mauro Coppolaro =

Italian football player

Personal information
- Date of birth: 10 March 1997 (age 29)
- Place of birth: Benevento, Italy
- Height: 1.89 m (6 ft 2 in)
- Position: Centre-back

Team information
- Current team: Arezzo
- Number: 4

Youth career
- –2014: Reggina
- 2014–2016: Udinese

Senior career*
Years	Team	Apps	(Gls)
2013–2014	Reggina	5	(0)
2014–2019	Udinese	0	(0)
2016–2017	→ Latina (loan)	20	(0)
2017–2018	→ Brescia (loan)	28	(0)
2018–2019	→ Venezia (loan)	16	(0)
2019–2022	Virtus Entella	78	(3)
2022–2025	Modena	17	(0)
2023–2025	→ Carrarese (loan)	45	(0)
2025–2026	Salernitana	14	(0)
2026–	Arezzo	14	(0)

International career^{‡}
2013–2014	Italy U17	12	(0)
2014–2015	Italy U18	5	(0)
2015–2016	Italy U19	20	(2)
2016–2018	Italy U20	15	(0)
Medal record
Men's football
Representing Italy
UEFA European Under-19 Championship
Runner-up	2016 Germany
- * Club domestic league appearances and goals as of 30 April 2026 ‡ National team caps and goals as of 30 October 2017

Mauro Coppolaro (born 10 March 1997) is an Italian professional footballer who plays as a centre-back for Serie B club Arezzo.

== Club career ==
=== Reggina ===
In 2014, Coppolaro was called up for Reggina's first team. He made his league debut on 10 May 2014, against Brescia at Stadio Oreste Granillo in a 1–1 draw. In this match, he played for 7 minutes before being substituted for Daniel Adejo. He planted himself in the team by playing 5 games in a month.

=== Udinese ===
In August 2014, he moved to Udinese for an undisclosed fee. There he played for two years with the Primavera team, in the youth under-19 national championship.

==== Latina (loan) ====
On 1 September 2016, Latina announced the signing of Coppolaro on loan until the end of the 2016/17 season. On 2 October 2016, he made his professional debut for Latina against Cesena. He has played 6 games in a row.

=== Virtus Entella ===
In 2019, Coppolaro joined Virtus Entella.

=== Modena ===
On 6 August 2022, Coppolaro signed a two-year contract with Modena with an option to extend. On 14 July 2023, he was loaned to Carrarese for two seasons.

== International career ==
Coppolaro has represented his country at various age groups. On 19 October 2013, he was first called up and played for Italy U17 against Ukraine.

With the Italy U19, he took part in the 2016 UEFA European Under-19 Championship, playing five games in the tournament. Italy finished the competition as runners-up.

== Career statistics ==
As of match played 15 March 2022

Appearances and goals by club, season and competition
Club	Season	League			National Cup		Other		Total	
Club	Season	Division	Apps	Goals	Apps	Goals	Apps	Goals	Apps	Goals
Reggina	2013–14	Serie B	5	0	0	0	—		5	0
Udinese	2014–15	Serie A	0	0	0	0	—		0	0
Udinese	2015–16	Serie A	0	0	0	0	—		0	0
Udinese	2016–17	Serie A	0	0	0	0	—		0	0
Udinese	Total		0	0	0	0	0	0	0	0
Latina (loan)	2016–17	Serie B	20	0	0	0	—		20	0
Brescia (loan)	2017–18	Serie B	28	0	2	0	—		30	0
Venezia (loan)	2018–19	Serie B	16	0	0	0	2 (Note: Appearance(s) in Relegation Playoffs)	0	18	0
Virtus Entella	2019–20	Serie B	25	0	0	0	—		25	0
Virtus Entella	2020–21	Serie B	21	0	3	0	—		24	0
Virtus Entella	2021–22	Serie C	31	3	—		—		31	3
Virtus Entella	Total		77	3	3	0	0	0	80	3
Career total			148	3	5	0	2	0	153	3

== Honours ==
Italy U19

- UEFA European Under-19 Championship runner-up: 2016
