= 2016–17 Udinese Calcio season =

Udinese
2016–17 season
- President: Franco Soldati
- Manager: Giuseppe Iachini (until 2 October 2016); Luigi Delneri (from 4 October 2016)
- Stadium: Stadio Friuli
- Serie A: 13th
- Coppa Italia: Third round
- Top goalscorer: League: Cyril Théréau (12); All: Cyril Théréau (12)
- Highest home attendance: 26,278 vs Juventus (5 March 2017, Serie A)
- Lowest home attendance: 7,000 vs Spezia (13 August 2016, Coppa Italia)
- Average home league attendance: 17,878
Home colours	Away colours	Third colours

The 2016–17 season was Udinese Calcio's 37th season in Serie A and their 22nd consecutive season in the top-flight. The club competed in Serie A, finishing 13th, and in the Coppa Italia, where they were eliminated in the third round by Serie B side Spezia Calcio.

== Players ==
=== Squad information ===
As of 6 February 2017

Note: Flags indicate national team as defined under FIFA eligibility rules; some limited exceptions apply. Players may hold more than one non-FIFA nationality.

No.	Pos.	Nation	Player
1	GK	(Greece) GRE	Orestis Karnezis
3	DF	(Brazil) BRA	Samir
4	DF	(Italy) ITA	Gabriele Angella
5	DF	(Brazil) BRA	Danilo
6	MF	(Ivory Coast) CIV	Seko Fofana
7	MF	(Ivory Coast) CIV	Assane Gnoukouri (on loan from Internazionale)
8	MF	(Ghana) GHA	Emmanuel Agyemang-Badu
9	FW	(Colombia) COL	Duván Zapata (on loan from Napoli)
10	FW	(Argentina) ARG	Rodrigo De Paul
14	MF	(Czech Republic) CZE	Jakub Jankto
18	FW	(Croatia) CRO	Stipe Perica
19	FW	(Brazil) BRA	Ryder Matos
20	MF	(Italy) ITA	Francesco Lodi
22	GK	(Italy) ITA	Simone Scuffet

No.	Pos.	Nation	Player
23	MF	(Iceland) ISL	Emil Hallfreðsson
25	GK	(Italy) ITA	Samuele Perisan
26	MF	(Belgium) BEL	Sven Kums (on loan from Gent)
27	DF	(Switzerland) SUI	Silvan Widmer
30	DF	(Brazil) BRA	Felipe
34	DF	(Brazil) BRA	Gabriel Silva
37	DF	(Italy) ITA	Davide Faraoni
53	DF	(Iraq) IRQ	Ali Adnan Kadhim
75	DF	(France) FRA	Thomas Heurtaux
77	FW	(France) FRA	Cyril Théréau
95	MF	(Brazil) BRA	Lucas Evangelista
96	FW	(Brazil) BRA	Ewandro
98	MF	(Australia) AUS	Panos Armenakas
99	MF	(Croatia) CRO	Andrija Balić

== Transfers ==
=== In ===
Date	Pos.	Player	Age	Moving from	Fee	Notes	Source
9 May 2016	FW	(Tunisia) Hamdi Harbaoui	31	(Belgium) Lokeren	Free		
15 June 2016	FW	(Croatia) Stipe Perica	20	(England) Chelsea	Undisclosed		
23 June 2016	MF	(Ivory Coast) Seko Fofana	21	(England) Manchester City	Undisclosed		
1 July 2016	DF	(Italy) Gabriele Angella	27	(England) Watford	Undisclosed		
7 July 2016	FW	(Brazil) Ewandro	20	(Brazil) São Paulo	Undisclosed		
20 July 2016	FW	(Argentina) Rodrigo De Paul	22	(Spain) Valencia	Undisclosed		

==== Loans in ====
Date	Pos.	Player	Age	Moving from	Fee	Notes	Source
11 July 2016	FW	(Venezuela) Adalberto Peñaranda	19	(England) Watford	Loan		
29 August 2016	MF	(Belgium) Sven Kums	28	(Belgium) Gent	Loan		

=== Out ===
Date	Pos.	Player	Age	Moving to	Fee	Notes	Source
4 June 2016	MF	(Chile) Manuel Iturra	31	(Mexico) Necaxa	Undisclosed		
8 June 2016	DF	(Italy) Maurizio Domizzi	35	(Italy) Venezia			
1 July 2016	FW	(Italy) Antonio Di Natale	38	End of contract			
7 July 2016	GK	(Serbia) Željko Brkić	29	(Greece) PAOK	Undisclosed		
8 July 2016	GK	(Venezuela) Rafael Romo	26	(Cyprus) AEL Limassol	Free		
23 December 2016	DF	(Colombia) Pablo Armero	30	(Brazil) Bahia	Undisclosed		
4 January 2017	FW	(Venezuela) Adalberto Peñaranda	19	(England) Watford	Free	Loan return	

==== Loans out ====
Date	Pos.	Player	Age	Moving to	Fee	Notes	Source
8 July 2016	MF	(Morocco) Nabil Jaadi	20	(Italy) Ascoli	Loan		
8 July 2016	MF	(Colombia) Alexis Zapata	21	(Italy) Perugia	Loan		
31 January 2017	DF	(Mali) Molla Wagué	25	(England) Leicester City	Loan		

== Pre-season and friendlies ==
Friendly	v

== Competitions ==
=== Overall ===
Competition	Started round	Current position	Final position	First match	Last match
Serie A	Matchday 1	—	13th	20 August 2016	28 May 2017
Coppa Italia	Third round	—	Third round	13 August 2016	13 August 2016

Last updated: 28 May 2017

=== Serie A ===
==== League table ====
Pos	Team	Pld	W	D	L	GF	GA	GD	Pts
11	Cagliari	38	14	5	19	55	76	−21	47
12	Sassuolo	38	13	7	18	58	63	−5	46
13	Udinese	38	12	9	17	47	56	−9	45
14	Chievo	38	12	7	19	43	61	−18	43
15	Bologna	38	11	8	19	40	58	−18	41

Source: Serie A, Soccerway
Rules for classification: 1) Points; 2) Head-to-head points; 3) Head-to-head goal difference; 4) Goal difference; 5) Goals scored; 6) Draw.

==== Results summary ====
Overall								Home						Away					
Pld	W	D	L	GF	GA	GD	Pts	W	D	L	GF	GA	GD	W	D	L	GF	GA	GD
38	12	9	17	47	56	−9	45	8	5	6	30	23	+7	4	4	11	17	33	−16

Last updated: 28 May 2017.
Source: Competitive matches

==== Results by round ====
Round	1	2	3	4	5	6	7	8	9	10	11	12	13	14	15	16	17	18	19	20	21	22	23	24	25	26	27	28	29	30	31	32	33	34	35	36	37	38
Ground	A	H	A	H	H	A	H	A	H	A	H	A	H	A	H	A	H	A	H	H	A	H	A	A	H	A	H	A	H	A	H	A	H	A	H	A	H	A
Result	L	W	W	L	D	L	L	L	W	W	D	D	L	L	W	W	W	D	L	L	L	W	D	L	L	L	D	W	W	D	W	L	W	L	D	L	D	L
Position	20	12	6	12	11	14	16	17	16	12	13	13	15	15	14	13	11	10	10	11	12	10	12	12	13	14	14	12	12	12	11	11	11	11	11	11	12	13

Updated to match(es) played on 28 May 2017. Source: Competitive matches
A = Away; H = Home; W = Win; D = Draw; L = Loss

==== Matches ====
20 August 2016 1	Roma	4–0	Udinese	Rome
18:00 CEST (UTC+02:00)	Perotti 65' (pen.), 75' (pen.); Džeko 82'; Salah 84'	Report	Samir (yellow card) 49'; Danilo (yellow card) 64'	Stadium: Stadio Olimpico; Attendance: 30,940; Referee: Marco Di Bello

28 August 2016 2	Udinese	2–0	Empoli	Udine
20:45 CEST (UTC+02:00)	Felipe 3', (yellow card) 24'; De Paul (yellow card) 78'; Karnezis (yellow card) 84'; Perica 90+5'	Report	Pucciarelli (yellow card) 53'; Barba (yellow card) 61'; Laurini (red card) 73'; Saponara (yellow card) 87'	Stadium: Dacia Arena; Attendance: 13,239; Referee: Fabio Maresca

11 September 2016 3	Milan	0–1	Udinese	Milan
15:00 CEST (UTC+02:00)	Bacca (yellow card) 29'	Report	Felipe (yellow card) 34'; Badu (yellow card) 63'; Perica (yellow card) 73', (goal) 88'; De Paul (yellow card) 74'; Armero (yellow card) 90+4'	Stadium: San Siro; Attendance: 28,303; Referee: Gianpaolo Calvarese

18 September 2016 4	Udinese	1–2	Chievo	Udine
12:30 CEST (UTC+02:00)	Zapata 25'; Hallfreðsson (yellow card) 39'; Kone (yellow card) 78'; Perica (yellow card) 88'	Report	Radovanović (yellow card) 33'; Cesar (yellow card) 36'; Cacciatore (yellow card) 74', (goal) 90+5'; Castro 82'; Dainelli (yellow card) 89'	Stadium: Dacia Arena; Attendance: 15,878; Referee: Luca Pairetto

21 September 2016 5	Udinese	2–2	Fiorentina	Udine
20:45 CEST (UTC+02:00)	Zapata 26'; Heurtaux (yellow card) 38'; Danilo 45'	Report	Babacar 30'; Bernardeschi 52' (pen.); Milić (yellow card) 53'; Tomović (yellow card) 64'; De Maio (yellow card) 83'	Stadium: Dacia Arena; Attendance: 15,164; Referee: Paolo Mazzoleni

25 September 2016 6	Sassuolo	1–0	Udinese	Reggio Emilia
15:00 CEST (UTC+02:00)	Defrel 34'; Peluso (yellow card) 44'; Biondini (yellow card) 71'; Magnanelli (yellow card) 88'	Report	Heurtaux (yellow card) 50'; Danilo (yellow card) 67'	Stadium: Mapei Stadium – Città del Tricolore; Attendance: 9,343; Referee: Daniele Doveri

1 October 2016 7	Udinese	0–3	Lazio	Udine
20:45 CEST (UTC+02:00)	Heurtaux (yellow card) 21'; Felipe (yellow card) 40'	Report	Immobile 28', 61'; Keita 54'; Patric (yellow card) 84'	Stadium: Dacia Arena; Attendance: 16,648; Referee: Carmine Russo

15 October 2016 8	Juventus	2–1	Udinese	Turin
20:45 CEST (UTC+02:00)	Dybala 43', 51' (pen.); Hernanes (yellow card) 66'	Report	Jankto 30'; Wagué (yellow card) 45+1'; Perica (yellow card) 59'	Stadium: Juventus Stadium; Attendance: 39,199; Referee: Claudio Gavillucci

23 October 2016 9	Udinese	3–1	Pescara	Udine
12:30 CEST (UTC+02:00)	Théréau 9' (pen.), 71', (yellow card) 34'; Karnezis (yellow card) 82'; Zapata 90+3' (pen.)	Report	Campagnaro (yellow card) 8'; Aquilani 74'	Stadium: Dacia Arena; Attendance: 14,317; Referee: Gianluca Rocchi

27 October 2016 10	Palermo	1–3	Udinese	Palermo
20:45 CEST (UTC+02:00)	Nestorovski 10'; Diamanti (yellow card) 12'; Pezzella (yellow card) 16'; Sallai (yellow card) 75' (yellow-red card) 83'	Report	Felipe (yellow card) 18'; Théréau 36'; Widmer (yellow card) 57'; Fofana 74', 79'	Stadium: Stadio Renzo Barbera; Attendance: 9,360; Referee: Daniele Orsato

31 October 2016 11	Udinese	2–2	Torino	Udine
19:00 CET (UTC+01:00)	Danilo (yellow card) 35'; Théréau 60'; Zapata 70', (yellow card) 71'	Report	Benassi 15'; Boyé (yellow card) 20'; Valdifiori (yellow card) 29'; Moretti (yellow card) 39'; Ljajić 77'	Stadium: Dacia Arena; Attendance: 19,984; Referee: Paolo Tagliavento

6 November 2016 12	Genoa	1–1	Udinese	Genoa
15:00 CET (UTC+01:00)	Ocampos 24'; Rigoni (yellow card) 53'; Ninković (yellow card) 79'	Report	Théréau 11'; Zapata (yellow card) 52'	Stadium: Stadio Luigi Ferraris; Attendance: 19,015; Referee: Gianluca Manganiello

19 November 2016 13	Udinese	1–2	Napoli	Udine
18:00 CET (UTC+01:00)	Perica 59'; Felipe (yellow card) 74'	Report	Insigne 47', 57'	Stadium: Dacia Arena; Attendance: 18,501; Referee: Luca Banti

27 November 2016 14	Cagliari	2–1	Udinese	Cagliari
15:00 CET (UTC+01:00)	Di Gennaro (yellow card) 21'; Farias 35' (pen.); Sau 58', (yellow card) 70'; Bittante (yellow card) 65'; Isla (yellow card) 68'	Report	Karnezis (yellow card) 35'; Fofana 51'; Faraoni (yellow card) 65'; Wagué (yellow card) 90+3'	Stadium: Stadio Sant'Elia; Attendance: 11,648; Referee: Luca Pairetto

5 December 2016 15	Udinese	1–0	Bologna	Udine
21:00 CET (UTC+01:00)	Hallfreðsson (yellow card) 35'; Felipe (yellow card) 56'; Danilo (yellow card) 57', (goal) 90+3'	Report	Pulgar (yellow card) 58' (yellow-red card) 68'	Stadium: Dacia Arena; Attendance: 16,014; Referee: Fabrizio Pasqua

11 December 2016 16	Atalanta	1–3	Udinese	Bergamo
15:00 CET (UTC+01:00)	Kurtić 47'; Gómez (yellow card) 66'	Report	Danilo (yellow card) 23'; Zapata 45'; Fofana 72'; Perica (yellow card) 83'; Théréau 87'	Stadium: Stadio Atleti Azzurri d'Italia; Attendance: 16,180; Referee: Fabio Maresca

18 December 2016 17	Udinese	2–0	Crotone	Udine
15:00 CET (UTC+01:00)	Théréau 43', 61'	Report	Crisetig (yellow card) 38'; Trotta (yellow card) 55'; Ferrari (yellow card) 59'; Cordaz (red card) 86'; Barberis (yellow card) 90+1'	Stadium: Dacia Arena; Attendance: 14,346; Referee: Juan Luca Sacchi

22 December 2016 18	Sampdoria	0–0	Udinese	Genoa
20:45 CET (UTC+01:00)	Muriel (yellow card) 38'	Report	Faraoni (yellow card) 57'	Stadium: Stadio Luigi Ferraris; Attendance: 17,526; Referee: Claudio Gavillucci

8 January 2017 19	Udinese	1–2	Internazionale	Udine
12:30 CET (UTC+01:00)	Jankto 17', (yellow card) 75'; Théréau (yellow card) 74'; Fofana (yellow card) 86'	Report	Perišić 45+2', 87'; Kondogbia (yellow card) 65'; Brozović (yellow card) 86'	Stadium: Dacia Arena; Attendance: 25,952; Referee: Daniele Doveri

15 January 2017 20	Udinese	0–1	Roma	Udine
15:00 CET (UTC+01:00)	Felipe (yellow card) 75'; Fofana (yellow card) 77'	Report	Nainggolan 12'; Juan Jesus (yellow card) 41'	Stadium: Dacia Arena; Attendance: 16,825; Referee: Antonio Damato

22 January 2017 21	Empoli	1–0	Udinese	Empoli
15:00 CET (UTC+01:00)	Bellusci (yellow card) 40'; Pasqual (yellow card) 45'; Costa (yellow card) 48'; Tello (yellow card) 78'; Mchedlidze 82'	Report	Jankto (yellow card) 27'; Hallfreðsson (yellow card) 32'; Samir (yellow card) 64'; Kums (yellow card) 87'	Stadium: Stadio Carlo Castellani; Attendance: 7,164; Referee: Carmine Russo

29 January 2017 22	Udinese	2–1	Milan	Udine
15:00 CET (UTC+01:00)	Théréau 31'; Samir (yellow card) 62'; De Paul (yellow card) 71', (goal) 73'; Angella (yellow card) 82'	Report	Bonaventura 8'; Pašalić (yellow card) 45+4'; Romagnoli (yellow card) 55'	Stadium: Dacia Arena; Attendance: 26,008; Referee: Luca Banti

5 February 2017 23	Chievo	0–0	Udinese	Verona
15:00 CET (UTC+01:00)	Meggiorini (yellow card) 29'; Cesar (yellow card) 65' (yellow-red card) 82'; Radovanović (yellow card) 70'	Report	De Paul (yellow card) 42'	Stadium: Stadio Marc'Antonio Bentegodi; Attendance: 8,500; Referee: Gianluca Aureliano

11 February 2017 24	Fiorentina	3–0	Udinese	Florence
20:45 CET (UTC+01:00)	Bernardeschi (yellow card) 30', (goal) 80' (pen.); Valero 41'; Babacar 62'; Milić (yellow card) 83'	Report	Hallfreðsson (yellow card) 38'; Fofana (yellow card) 79'	Stadium: Stadio Artemio Franchi; Attendance: 24,360; Referee: Maurizio Mariani

19 February 2017 25	Udinese	1–2	Sassuolo	Udine
15:00 CET (UTC+01:00)	Fofana 7'; Hallfreðsson (yellow card) 30'; Danilo (yellow card) 67'; De Paul (yellow card) 90+2'	Report	Aquilani (yellow card) 20'; Peluso (yellow card) 49'; Defrel 70', 79'	Stadium: Dacia Arena; Attendance: 17,719; Referee: Paolo Tagliavento

26 February 2017 26	Lazio	1–0	Udinese	Rome
15:00 CET (UTC+01:00)	Hoedt (yellow card) 45+1'; De Vrij (yellow card) 54'; Immobile 72' (pen.)	Report	Ali Adnan (yellow card) 71'; Danilo (yellow card) 78'; Jankto (yellow card) 90+2'	Stadium: Stadio Olimpico; Attendance: 15,000; Referee: Luca Pairetto

5 March 2017 27	Udinese	1–1	Juventus	Udine
15:00 CET (UTC+01:00)	Zapata 37'; Jankto (yellow card) 45+1'; Hallfreðsson (yellow card) 66'	Report	Bonucci 60'; Cuadrado (yellow card) 68'; Pjaca (yellow card) 77'	Stadium: Dacia Arena; Attendance: 25,828; Referee: Antonio Damato

12 March 2017 28	Pescara	1–3	Udinese	Pescara
15:00 CET (UTC+01:00)	Bruno (yellow card) 39'; Bovo (yellow card) 53'; Muntari 83'	Report	Angella (yellow card) 12'; Zapata 20'; Hallfreðsson (yellow card) 35'; Jankto 51'; Théréau 55'; Gabriel Silva (yellow card) 86'; De Paul (yellow card) 90+4'	Stadium: Stadio Adriatico – Giovanni Cornacchia; Attendance: 11,105; Referee: Domenico Celi

19 March 2017 29	Udinese	4–1	Palermo	Udine
18:00 CET (UTC+01:00)	Théréau 42', (yellow card) 45'; Zapata 60'; De Paul 68'; Hallfreðsson (yellow card) 71'; Danilo (yellow card) 71'; Jankto 80'	Report	Sallai 12'; Gazzi (yellow card) 53'; Diamanti (red card) 74'; Morganella (yellow card) 84'	Stadium: Dacia Arena; Attendance: 15,469; Referee: Fabio Maresca

2 April 2017 30	Torino	2–2	Udinese	Turin
12:30 CEST (UTC+02:00)	Rossettini (yellow card) 5'; Moretti 70'; Belotti 83'	Report	Kums (yellow card) 9'; Jankto 50', (yellow card) 90+1'; Angella (yellow card) 54'; Perica 68'	Stadium: Stadio Olimpico Grande Torino; Attendance: 17,882; Referee: Davide Ghersini

9 April 2017 31	Udinese	3–0	Genoa	Udine
15:00 CEST (UTC+02:00)	De Paul 20', 49'; Zapata 31'; Evangelista (yellow card) 60'; Gabriel Silva (yellow card) 87'	Report	Burdisso (yellow card) 46'; Cofie (yellow card) 82'	Stadium: Dacia Arena; Attendance: 16,126; Referee: Maurizio Mariani

15 April 2017 32	Napoli	3–0	Udinese	Naples
20:45 CEST (UTC+02:00)	Mertens 48'; Allan 63'; Callejón 72'	Report	Badu (yellow card) 1'	Stadium: Stadio San Paolo; Attendance: 38,764; Referee: Davide Massa

23 April 2017 33	Udinese	2–1	Cagliari	Udine
15:00 CEST (UTC+02:00)	Felipe (yellow card) 58'; Perica 70'; Angella 73'	Report	Barella (yellow card) 69'; Borriello 86'	Stadium: Dacia Arena; Attendance: 16,623; Referee: Valerio Marini

30 April 2017 34	Bologna	4–0	Udinese	Bologna
15:00 CEST (UTC+02:00)	Destro 2', 59'; Viviani (yellow card) 26'; Taïder 45+1'; Danilo 68' (o.g.)	Report	Hallfreðsson (yellow card) 20'; Zapata (yellow card) 36'; Danilo (yellow card) 42'	Stadium: Stadio Renato Dall'Ara; Attendance: 22,360; Referee: Domenico Celi

7 May 2017 35	Udinese	1–1	Atalanta	Udine
12:30 CEST (UTC+02:00)	Balić (yellow card) 34'; Felipe (yellow card) 43'; Perica 53'; Hallfreðsson (yellow card) 82'; De Paul (yellow card) 88'	Report	Raimondi (yellow card) 33'; Cristante 41'; Kurtić (yellow card) 55'; Masiello (yellow card) 61'	Stadium: Dacia Arena; Attendance: 18,476; Referee: Marco Di Bello

14 May 2017 36	Crotone	1–0	Udinese	Crotone
15:00 CEST (UTC+02:00)	Rohdén 18'; Falcinelli (yellow card) 37'; Sampirisi (yellow card) 88'	Report	Kums (yellow card) 37'; Ali Adnan (yellow card) 76'	Stadium: Stadio Ezio Scida; Attendance: 8,230; Referee: Michael Fabbri

21 May 2017 37	Udinese	1–1	Sampdoria	Udine
15:00 CEST (UTC+02:00)	Théréau 5'; De Paul (red card) 47'; Danilo (red card) 65'; Jankto (yellow card) 90+3'	Report	Torreira (yellow card) 30'; Sala (yellow card) 56'; Muriel 64' (pen.), (red card) 65'	Stadium: Dacia Arena; Attendance: 16,119; Referee: Riccardo Pinzani

28 May 2017 38	Internazionale	5–2	Udinese	Milan
20:45 CEST (UTC+02:00)	Éder 5', 54'; Perišić 18'; Brozović 36'; D'Ambrosio (yellow card) 63'; Angella 78' (o.g.); Sainsbury (yellow card) 83'	Report	Widmer (yellow card) 71'; Balić 76'; Zapata 90+2'	Stadium: San Siro; Attendance: 36,689; Referee: Aleandro Di Paolo

=== Coppa Italia ===
13 August 2016 Third round	Udinese	2–3	Spezia	Udine
19:30 CEST (UTC+02:00)	De Paul 35'; Zapata 89'	Report	Sciaudone (yellow card) 16'; Errasti (yellow card) 27'; Valentini 37'; Okereke 40'; Nenê 59'; Vignali (yellow card) 88'; Ceccaroni (yellow card) 90'	Stadium: Dacia Arena; Attendance: 7,000; Referee: Rosario Abisso

== Statistics ==
=== Appearances and goals ===
No.	Pos	Nat	Player	Total		Serie A		Coppa Italia	
No.	Pos	Nat	Player	Apps	Goals	Apps	Goals	Apps	Goals
Goalkeepers
1	GK	(Greece) GRE	Orestis Karnezis	34	0	33	0	1	0
22	GK	(Italy) ITA	Simone Scuffet	6	0	5+1	0	0	0
25	GK	(Italy) ITA	Samuele Perisan	0	0	0	0	0	0
Defenders
3	DF	(Brazil) BRA	Samir	21	0	21	0	0	0
4	DF	(Italy) ITA	Gabriele Angella	14	1	10+4	1	0	0
5	DF	(Brazil) BRA	Danilo	37	2	36	2	1	0
27	DF	(Switzerland) SUI	Silvan Widmer	29	0	28	0	1	0
30	DF	(Brazil) BRA	Felipe	33	1	31+1	1	1	0
34	DF	(Brazil) BRA	Gabriel Silva	5	0	2+3	0	0	0
37	DF	(Italy) ITA	Davide Faraoni	5	0	4+1	0	0	0
53	DF	(Iraq) IRQ	Ali Adnan Kadhim	14	0	8+6	0	0	0
75	DF	(France) FRA	Thomas Heurtaux	13	0	6+6	0	1	0
Midfielders
6	MF	(Ivory Coast) CIV	Seko Fofana	23	5	21+1	5	1	0
7	MF	(Ivory Coast) CIV	Assane Gnoukouri	0	0	0	0	0	0
8	MF	(Ghana) GHA	Emmanuel Agyemang-Badu	30	0	20+9	0	1	0
14	MF	(Czech Republic) CZE	Jakub Jankto	30	5	24+5	5	0+1	0
23	MF	(Iceland) ISL	Emil Hallfreðsson	29	0	23+5	0	0+1	0
26	MF	(Belgium) BEL	Sven Kums	29	0	20+9	0	0	0
95	MF	(Brazil) BRA	Lucas Evangelista	6	0	2+4	0	0	0
99	MF	(Croatia) CRO	Andrija Balić	4	1	3+1	1	0	0
Forwards
9	FW	(Colombia) COL	Duván Zapata	39	11	37+1	10	1	1
10	FW	(Argentina) ARG	Rodrigo De Paul	35	5	32+2	4	1	1
18	FW	(Croatia) CRO	Stipe Perica	27	6	5+22	6	0	0
19	FW	(Brazil) BRA	Ryder Matos	21	0	4+16	0	1	0
77	FW	(France) FRA	Cyril Théréau	33	12	31+2	12	0	0
96	FW	(Brazil) BRA	Ewandro	5	0	0+5	0	0	0
Players transferred out during the season
2	DF	(Mali) MLI	Molla Wagué	6	0	6	0	0	0
7	DF	(Colombia) COL	Pablo Armero	3	0	2	0	1	0
11	FW	(Venezuela) VEN	Adalberto Peñaranda	7	0	1+5	0	0+1	0
20	MF	(Italy) ITA	Francesco Lodi	1	0	0+1	0	0	0
33	MF	(Greece) GRE	Panagiotis Kone	5	0	3+2	0	0	0

Last updated: 28 May 2017
Source: Competitions

=== Goalscorers ===
Rank	No.	Pos	Nat	Name	Serie A	Coppa Italia	Total
1	77	FW	(France)	Cyril Théréau	12	0	12
2	9	FW	(Colombia)	Duván Zapata	10	1	11
3	18	FW	(Croatia)	Stipe Perica	6	0	6
4	6	MF	(Ivory Coast)	Seko Fofana	5	0	5
4	10	FW	(Argentina)	Rodrigo De Paul	4	1	5
4	14	MF	(Czech Republic)	Jakub Jankto	5	0	5
7	5	DF	(Brazil)	Danilo	2	0	2
8	4	DF	(Italy)	Gabriele Angella	1	0	1
8	30	DF	(Brazil)	Felipe	1	0	1
8	99	MF	(Croatia)	Andrija Balić	1	0	1
Own goal					0	0	0
Totals					47	2	49

Last updated: 28 May 2017

=== Clean sheets ===
Rank	No.	Pos	Nat	Name	Serie A	Coppa Italia	Total
1	1	GK	(Greece)	Orestis Karnezis	7	0	7
Totals					7	0	7

Last updated: 28 May 2017

=== Disciplinary record ===
No.	Pos	Nat	Player	Serie A			Coppa Italia			Total		
No.	Pos	Nat	Player	Booked	(yellow card) (yellow-red card)	Sent off (straight red)	Booked	(yellow card) (yellow-red card)	Sent off (straight red)	Booked	(yellow card) (yellow-red card)	Sent off (straight red)
1	GK	(Greece)	Orestis Karnezis	3	0	0	0	0	0	3	0	0
22	GK	(Italy)	Simone Scuffet	0	0	0	0	0	0	0	0	0
25	GK	(Italy)	Samuele Perisan	0	0	0	0	0	0	0	0	0
2	DF	(Mali)	Molla Wagué	2	0	0	0	0	0	2	0	0
3	DF	(Brazil)	Samir	3	0	0	0	0	0	3	0	0
4	DF	(Italy)	Gabriele Angella	3	0	0	0	0	0	3	0	0
5	DF	(Brazil)	Danilo	9	0	1	0	0	0	9	0	1
7	DF	(Colombia)	Pablo Armero	1	0	0	0	0	0	1	0	0
27	DF	(Switzerland)	Silvan Widmer	2	0	0	0	0	0	2	0	0
30	DF	(Brazil)	Felipe	9	0	0	0	0	0	9	0	0
34	DF	(Brazil)	Gabriel Silva	2	0	0	0	0	0	2	0	0
37	MF	(Italy)	Davide Faraoni	2	0	0	0	0	0	2	0	0
53	DF	(Iraq)	Ali Adnan Kadhim	2	0	0	0	0	0	2	0	0
75	DF	(France)	Thomas Heurtaux	3	0	0	0	0	0	3	0	0
6	MF	(Ivory Coast)	Seko Fofana	3	0	0	0	0	0	3	0	0
7	MF	(Ivory Coast)	Assane Gnoukouri	0	0	0	0	0	0	0	0	0
8	MF	(Ghana)	Emmanuel Agyemang-Badu	2	0	0	0	0	0	2	0	0
14	MF	(Czech Republic)	Jakub Jankto	6	0	0	0	0	0	6	0	0
20	MF	(Italy)	Francesco Lodi	0	0	0	0	0	0	0	0	0
23	MF	(Iceland)	Emil Hallfreðsson	10	0	0	0	0	0	10	0	0
26	MF	(Belgium)	Sven Kums	3	0	0	0	0	0	3	0	0
33	MF	(Greece)	Panagiotis Kone	1	0	0	0	0	0	1	0	0
95	MF	(Brazil)	Lucas Evangelista	1	0	0	0	0	0	1	0	0
98	MF	(Australia)	Panos Armenakas	0	0	0	0	0	0	0	0	0
99	MF	(Croatia)	Andrija Balić	1	0	0	0	0	0	1	0	0
9	FW	(Colombia)	Duván Zapata	3	0	0	0	0	0	3	0	0
10	FW	(Argentina)	Rodrigo De Paul	7	0	1	0	0	0	7	0	1
11	FW	(Venezuela)	Adalberto Peñaranda	0	0	0	0	0	0	0	0	0
18	FW	(Croatia)	Stipe Perica	4	0	0	0	0	0	4	0	0
19	FW	(Brazil)	Ryder Matos	0	0	0	0	0	0	0	0	0
77	FW	(France)	Cyril Théréau	3	0	0	0	0	0	3	0	0
96	FW	(Brazil)	Ewandro	0	0	0	0	0	0	0	0	0
Totals				85	0	2	0	0	0	85	0	2

Last updated: 28 May 2017
