= Andrija Balić =

Croatian footballer

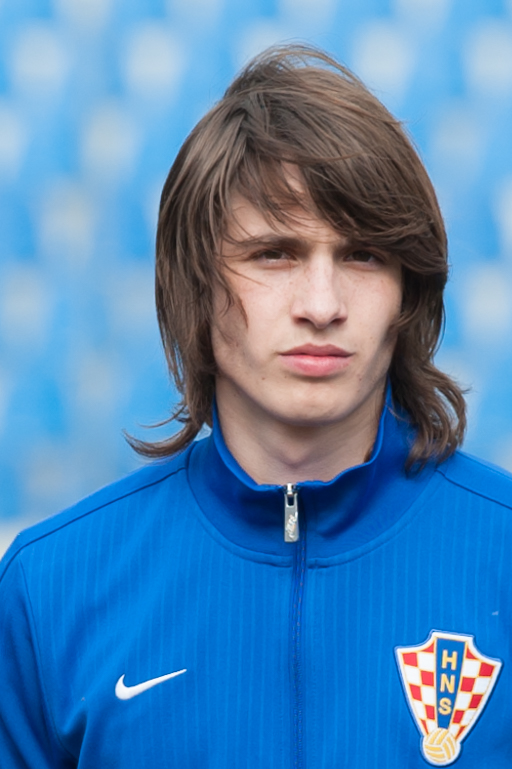
- Balić with Croatia U19 in 2015

Personal information
- Date of birth: 11 August 1997 (age 29)
- Place of birth: Split, Croatia
- Height: 1.78 m (5 ft 10 in)
- Position: Midfielder

Team information
- Current team: Dugopolje
- Number: 10

Youth career
- 2004–2007: Dugopolje
- 2007–2014: Hajduk Split

Senior career*
Years	Team	Apps	(Gls)
2014–2016	Hajduk Split	32	(6)
2016–2020	Udinese	29	(1)
2019	→ Fortuna Sittard (loan)	13	(1)
2019	→ Perugia (loan)	10	(0)
2020	→ DAC Dunajská Streda (loan)	7	(1)
2020–2023	DAC Dunajská Streda	47	(9)
2023	→ Dukla Banská Bystrica (loan)	12	(5)
2023–2024	Zrinjski Mostar	1	(0)
2024	Zlaté Moravce	13	(0)
2024–2025	Chieti	8	(0)
2025–	Dugopolje	35	(4)

International career^{‡}
2011	Croatia U14	2	(0)
2012	Croatia U15	2	(0)
2012–2013	Croatia U16	4	(0)
2013	Croatia U17	5	(0)
2014	Croatia U18	3	(0)
2014–2016	Croatia U19	12	(0)
2015–2018	Croatia U21	11	(0)
- * Club domestic league appearances and goals as of 16 June 2026 ‡ National team caps and goals as of 27 March 2019

Andrija Balić (Croatian pronunciation: [ǎndrija bǎːlitɕ, - bǎ-]; born 11 August 1997) is a Croatian footballer who plays as a midfielder for Dugopolje.

== Club career ==
=== Early career ===
Born in Split but living in nearby Dugopolje, Balić started to train football at the local NK Dugopolje, before moving to the Hajduk Split academy in 2007.

Passing through the ranks, he became a youth international, playing for all Croatian selections between U14 and U19.

In the 2013–14 season he formed a potent midfield partnership for the Hajduk U17 team with Nikola Vlašić, which resulted in the team finishing the first half of the season in first place, without a single loss. The two then received and signed professional contracts, until 2017 and were moved to the U19 team. Balić made his first team debut in the 1–0 home win against RNK Split, coming in the 76th minute of the match for Temurkhuja Abdukholiqov.

=== Hajduk Split ===
He had to wait until December to make his first appearance of the 2014–15 season, but then became a much more prevalent member of the first team. He got his first start for Hajduk on 18 February 2015, in a 3–0 away loss to Rijeka. He scored his first goal for Hajduk on 1 March 2015 in a 2–2 draw against Zadar, helping his side claw a point after being 2–0 down. His bigger impact on the first team led Balić to be rewarded with a new contract ending in mid-2018.

=== Udinese ===
On 1 February 2016, he signed for Udinese in a €4 million deal. In his first half-season with Udinese, Balić made the bench on 15 occasions, but failed to make a first team appearance. The next season was much the same for Balić, sitting on the bench 28 times without making an appearance before making his senior team debut on 7 May 2017 in a 1–1 draw with Atalanta Bergamo at the Stadio Friuli, playing the first 60 minutes before being replaced by Sven Kums. He would go on to appear in the three following matches and score his first goal for Udinese in a 5–2 loss to Inter Milan at the San Siro. Balić made just one appearance in the first 11 rounds of the 2017–18 Serie A season, but following the appointment of Massimo Oddo, he became more prevalent in the first eleven once more.

==== Fortuna Sittard (loan) ====
On 24 January 2019, Balić joined to Dutch club Fortuna Sittard on loan until 30 June 2019.

==== Perugia (loan) ====
On 30 August 2019, he joined Serie B club Perugia on a season-long loan.

==== DAC Dunajská Streda ====
Balić continued to be loaned out of Udinese, as his next half-season loan was announced on 14 February 2020, when he was loaned out to DAC 1904 Dunajská Streda, playing in the Slovak Fortuna Liga.

Balić made his Fortuna Liga debut in an away fixture against Ružomberok on 22 February 2020. Balić was fielded in the starting line-up but was replaced before the second half by Eric Ramírez. The match concluded in a goal-less tie.

Balić scored his first and only league goal for DAC in his first game after the COVID-19 pandemic. On 21 June 2020, DAC defeated Spartak Trnava (2:0) at Štadión Antona Malatinského. Balić completed the entire match scored the second goal of the match, following a pass from Marko Divković. Earlier on, on 4 March, Balić scored in a 2:0 win over Poprad in the quarterfinals of the Slovnaft Cup, scoring the second goal of the match. He also appeared in a crucial 0:3 defeat against Ružomberok in the away tie of the semifinals, ending DAC's campaign in the Cup.

Of 12 eligible games in the 2019/20 season, he participated in nine matches, scoring two goals. After the conclusion of the season, he moved to DAC on a permanent transfer, signing a three-season deal.

==== Zrinjski Mostar ====
In September 2021, Balić joined Bosnian Premier League club Zrinjski Mostar. He signed a two-year deal with Zrinjski, where he only played one game against AZ Alkmaar in the UEFA Conference League getting subbed off at half time for Zvonimir Kožulj who proceeded to score the first and last goal in Zrinjski's 4–3 comeback.

== Career statistics ==
As of match played 15 March 2019

Club	Season	League			Cup		Europe		Total	
Club	Season	Division	Apps	Goals	Apps	Goals	Apps	Goals	Apps	Goals
Hajduk Split	2013–14	Croatian First Football League	2	0	–		–		2	0
Hajduk Split	2014–15	Croatian First Football League	14	4	3	2	–		17	6
Hajduk Split	2015–16	Croatian First Football League	16	2	2	0	8	2	26	4
Hajduk Split	Total		32	6	5	2	8	2	45	10
Udinese	2016–17	Serie A	4	1	–		–		4	1
Udinese	2017–18	Serie A	21	0	3	0	–		24	0
Udinese	2018–19	Serie A	4	0	1	0	–		5	0
Udinese	Total		29	1	4	0	0	0	33	1
Fortuna Sittard (loan)	2018–19	Eredivisie	6	0	–		–		6	0
Career total			67	7	9	2	8	2	84	11

== Honours ==
Individual

- Slovak Super Liga Goal of the Month: October 2020, April 2021
