= Nícolas (footballer, born 1988) =

Brazilian footballer

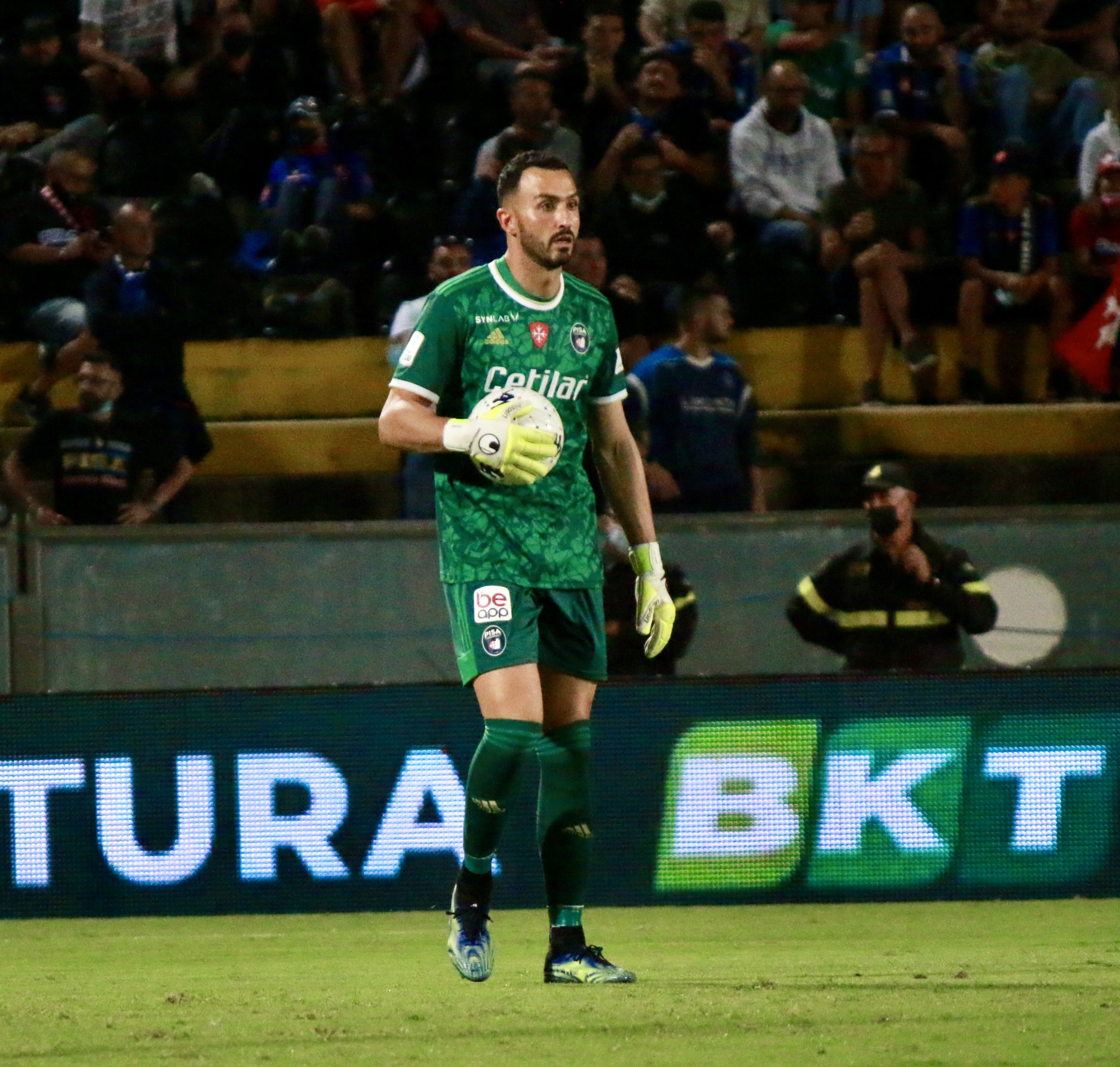
- Nicolas with Pisa SC in 2021

Personal information
- Full name: Nícolas David Andrade
- Date of birth: 12 April 1988 (age 38)
- Place of birth: Colorado do Oeste, Brazil
- Height: 1.90 m (6 ft 3 in)
- Position: Goalkeeper

Youth career
- Atlético Mineiro

Senior career*
Years	Team	Apps	(Gls)
2009–2010	Atlético Mineiro	0	(0)
2009	→ Villa Nova (loan)	5	(0)
2009	→ Tombense (loan)	0	(0)
2010	Anapolina	0	(0)
2010–2019	Verona	81	(0)
2014–2015	→ Virtus Lanciano (loan)	35	(0)
2015–2016	→ Trapani (loan)	40	(0)
2018–2019	→ Udinese (loan)	0	(0)
2019–2021	Udinese	2	(0)
2021	Reggina	21	(0)
2021–2026	Pisa	101	(0)
- * Club domestic league appearances and goals as of 23 May 2026

Nícolas David Andrade (born 12 April 1988), known as Nícolas, is a Brazilian professional footballer who plays as a goalkeeper.

== Club career ==
On 14 January 2021, he signed a six-month contract with Serie B club Reggina.

On 10 June 2021, he signed a two-year contract with Pisa.

== Career statistics ==
As of match played 22 March 2026

Appearances and goals by club, season and competition
Club	Season	League			Cup		Other		Total	
Club	Season	Division	Apps	Goals	Apps	Goals	Apps	Goals	Apps	Goals
Verona	2010–11	Prima Divisione	0	0	0	0	0	0	0	0
Verona	2011–12	Serie B	0	0	1	0	—		1	0
Verona	2012–13	Serie B	2	0	0	0	—		2	0
Verona	2013–14	Serie A	1	0	0	0	—		1	0
Verona	2016–17	Serie B	42	0	2	0	—		44	0
Verona	2017–18	Serie A	36	0	1	0	—		37	0
Verona	Total		81	0	4	0	0	0	85	0
Trapani (loan)	2014–15	Serie B	35	0	2	0	—		37	0
Trapani (loan)	2015–16	Serie B	40	0	2	0	4	0	46	0
Udinese (loan)	2018–19	Serie A	0	0	1	0	—		1	0
Udinese	2019–20	Serie A	0	0	2	0	—		2	0
Udinese	2020–21	Serie A	2	0	0	0	—		2	0
Udinese	Total		2	0	2	0	—		4	0
Reggina	2020–21	Serie B	21	0	—		—		21	0
Pisa	2021–22	Serie B	35	0	1	0	4	0	40	0
Pisa	2022–23	Serie B	28	0	1	0	—		29	0
Pisa	2023–24	Serie B	31	0	1	0	—		32	0
Pisa	2024–25	Serie B	1	0	1	0	—		2	0
Pisa	2025–26	Serie A	6	0	0	0	—		6	0
Pisa	Total		101	0	4	0	4	0	109	0
Career total			280	0	16	0	8	0	304	0
