= Simone Scuffet =

Italian footballer (born 1996)

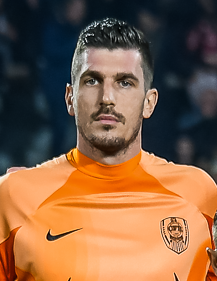
- Scuffet with CFR Cluj in 2023

Personal information
- Date of birth: 31 May 1996 (age 30)
- Place of birth: Udine, Italy
- Height: 1.93 m (6 ft 4 in)
- Position: Goalkeeper

Team information
- Current team: Pisa
- Number: 1

Youth career
- 2002–2004: Aurora Buonacquisto
- 2004–2005: Moimacco
- 2005–2006: Udinese
- 2006–2007: Donatello Calcio
- 2007–2013: Udinese

Senior career*
Years	Team	Apps	(Gls)
2013–2021	Udinese	40	(0)
2015–2016	→ Como (loan)	35	(0)
2019	→ Kasımpaşa (loan)	10	(0)
2019–2020	→ Spezia (loan)	32	(0)
2021–2022	APOEL	24	(0)
2022–2023	CFR Cluj	34	(0)
2023–2025	Cagliari	44	(0)
2025	→ Napoli (loan)	1	(0)
2025–	Pisa	7	(0)

International career^{‡}
2012–2013	Italy U17	18	(0)
2013	Italy U18	5	(0)
2014–2015	Italy U19	12	(0)
2016	Italy U20	2	(0)
2015–2017	Italy U21	8	(0)
Medal record
Men's football
Representing Italy
UEFA European U17 Championship
Runner-up	2013
- * Club domestic league appearances and goals as of 20 April 2026 ‡ National team caps and goals as of 11 October 2018

Simone Scuffet (Italian pronunciation: [siˈmoːne skufˈfɛt]; born 31 May 1996) is an Italian professional footballer who plays as a goalkeeper for Serie B club Pisa.

== Club career ==
=== Udinese ===
An Udinese youth product, Scuffet made his first team debut on 1 February 2014 at the age of 17 in a Serie A match against Bologna, as a replacement for injured Željko Brkić. After a string of impressive performances, he was subsequently promoted as first choice keeper, relegating Brkić on the bench.

On 9 June 2014, following a successful debut season, Scuffet signed a new five-year deal with the club. He failed to get the same level of game time during the 2014–15 season with Orestis Karnezis preferred as the first-choice goalkeeper at Udinese. On 8 December 2014, he Scuffet was named at the #1 spot in the goalkeepers category as part of Outside of the Boot's 100 Best Young Players to Watch in 2015 feature. On 16 December 2014, he was named at the #1 spot as FutbolSapiens's 10 Best Young Goalkeepers of the Year feature.

==== Various loans ====
On 6 August 2015, Scuffet was sent out on loan to Serie B side Como. Although he was able to obtain more playing time at Como, he endured a negative season with the club, as he conceded 52 goals, while Como finished in last place in the league and were relegated to Lega Pro at the end of the 2015–16 Serie B season.

On 16 January 2019, Scuffet joined Turkish side Kasımpaşa on loan until 30 June.

On 19 August 2019, Scuffet joined Serie B club Spezia on loan until 30 June 2020 with an option to buy. He was the starting goalkeeper throughout the season, which ended with the club achieving promotion to Serie A.

==== Return to Udinese ====
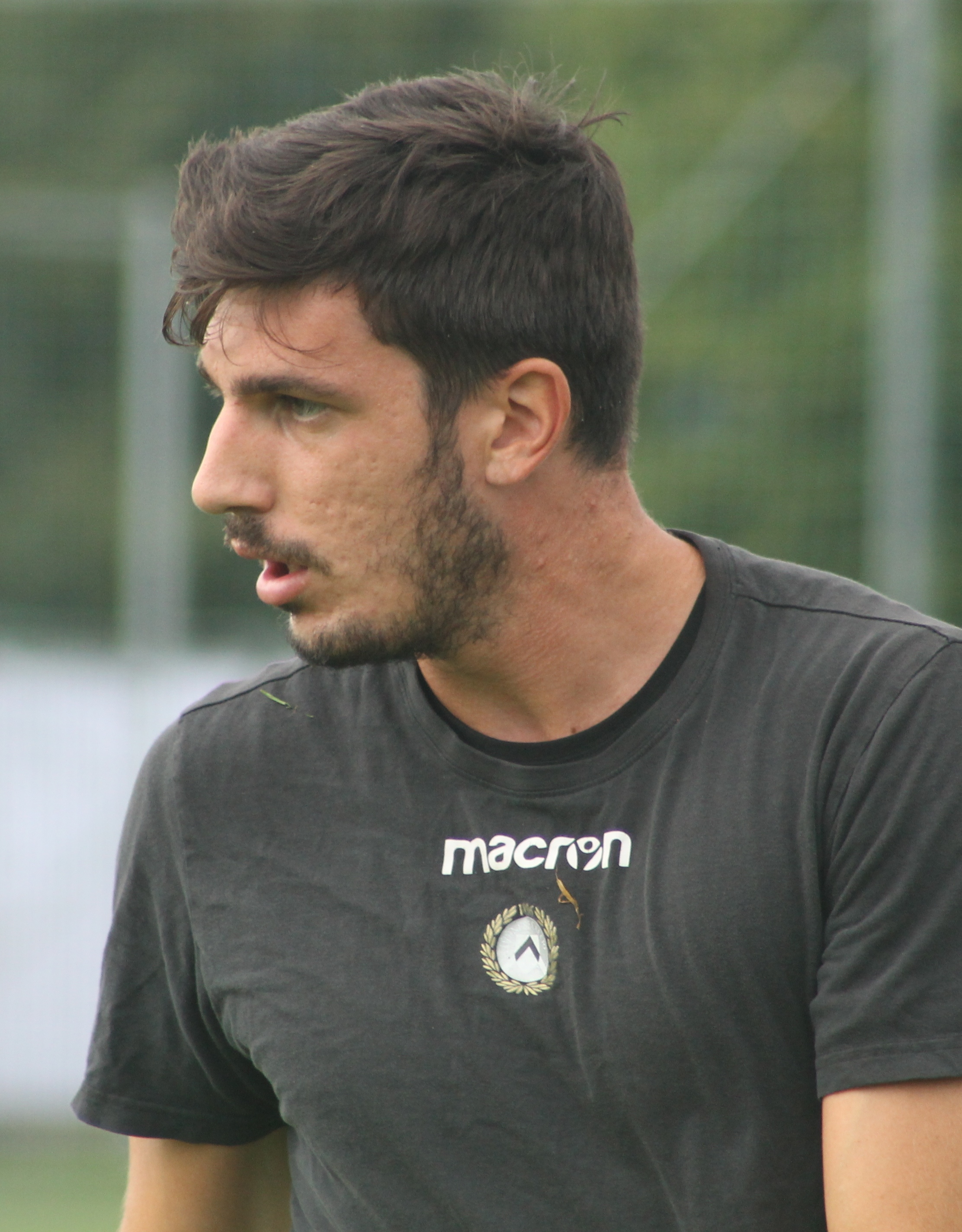
Scuffet with Udinese in 2019.

In July 2020, Scuffet returned to Udinese. On 28 October, he returned between the sticks for the club, playing as a starter in the Italian Cup match against Vicenza, which finished in a 3–1 win. On 2 May 2021, due to a suspension of starting goalkeeper Juan Musso, he returned to Serie A action for the 2–1 defeat against Juventus in which he conceded two goals to Cristiano Ronaldo.

=== APOEL ===
On 30 August 2021, Scuffet signed a two-year contract with Cypriot First Division club APOEL.

=== CFR Cluj ===
On 17 July 2022, Scuffet joined Romanian Liga I champions CFR Cluj on a free transfer.

=== Cagliari ===
On 14 July 2023, Scuffet joined Serie A club Cagliari on a deal for a transfer fee reportedly worth €2 million plus €1 million in bonuses.

==== Loan to Napoli ====
On 7 January 2025, Scuffet was loaned to Napoli for the remainder of the season.

=== Pisa ===
On 23 July 2025, Scuffet signed a three-season contract with Pisa.

== International career ==
Scuffet has represented Italy U-17 team at both the 2013 UEFA European Under-17 Championship – where they reached the final – and the 2013 FIFA U-17 World Cup, where they were eliminated in the round of 16 by Mexico.

In March and in April 2014 he was called up by Italy senior coach Cesare Prandelli to join two training camps ahead of the 2014 World Cup.

He made his first appearance for the Italy U-21 team on 12 August 2015, in a friendly match against Hungary. In June 2017, he was included in the Italy under-21 squad for the 2017 UEFA European Under-21 Championship by manager Luigi Di Biagio.

== Style of play ==
Scuffet has earned praise in the media for his reflexes, confidence, consistency, calm composure, leadership qualities, and precocious performances as a youngster, which have earned him comparisons with former Italy national football team goalkeeper and 2006 World Cup winner Gianluigi Buffon, who also made his Serie A debut as a teenager. In 2014 Don Balón listed him as one of the top 100 young players in the world. His ability to come out off his line and his confidence when handling crosses and high balls have been cited as areas for improvement by pundits, however. Despite the talent he demonstrated in his youth, he has been accused by certain pundits of not living up to his potential, in particular after a dip in form he suffered between 2015 and 2019.

== Career statistics ==
As of match played 20 April 2026

Appearances and goals by club, season and competition
Club	Season	League			National cup (Note: Includes Coppa Italia, Turkish Cup, Cupa României)		Europe		Other		Total	
Club	Season	Division	Apps	Goals	Apps	Goals	Apps	Goals	Apps	Goals	Apps	Goals
Udinese	2012–13	Serie A	0	0	—		—		—		0	0
Udinese	2013–14	Serie A	16	0	2	0	—		—		18	0
Udinese	2014–15	Serie A	2	0	3	0	—		—		5	0
Udinese	2016–17	Serie A	6	0	0	0	—		—		6	0
Udinese	2017–18	Serie A	6	0	3	0	—		—		9	0
Udinese	2018–19	Serie A	9	0	0	0	—		—		9	0
Udinese	2020–21	Serie A	1	0	1	0	—		—		2	0
Udinese	Total		40	0	9	0	—		—		49	0
Como (loan)	2015–16	Serie B	35	0	—		—		—		35	0
Kasımpaşa (loan)	2018–19	Süper Lig	10	0	1	0	—		—		11	0
Spezia (loan)	2019–20	Serie B	32	0	—		—		4 (Note: Appearances in Serie B promotion play-offs)	0	36	0
APOEL	2021–22	Cypriot First Division	24	0	0	0	—		—		24	0
CFR Cluj	2022–23	Liga I	34	0	2	0	12 (Note: Appearances in UEFA Europa Conference League)	0	1 (Note: Appearance in Liga I European play-offs)	0	49	0
Cagliari	2023–24	Serie A	31	0	0	0	—		—		31	0
Cagliari	2024–25	Serie A	13	0	2	0	—		—		15	0
Cagliari	Total		44	0	2	0	—		—		46	0
Napoli (loan)	2024–25	Serie A	1	0	—		—		—		1	0
Pisa	2025–26	Serie A	7	0	1	0	—		—		8	0
Career total			227	0	15	0	12	0	5	0	259	0

== Honours ==
Napoli

- Serie A: 2024–25

Italy U17

- UEFA European Under-17 Championship runner-up: 2013

Individual

- CFR Cluj Player of the Year: 2022–23
