= Gabriele Angella =

Italian professional footballer (born 1989)

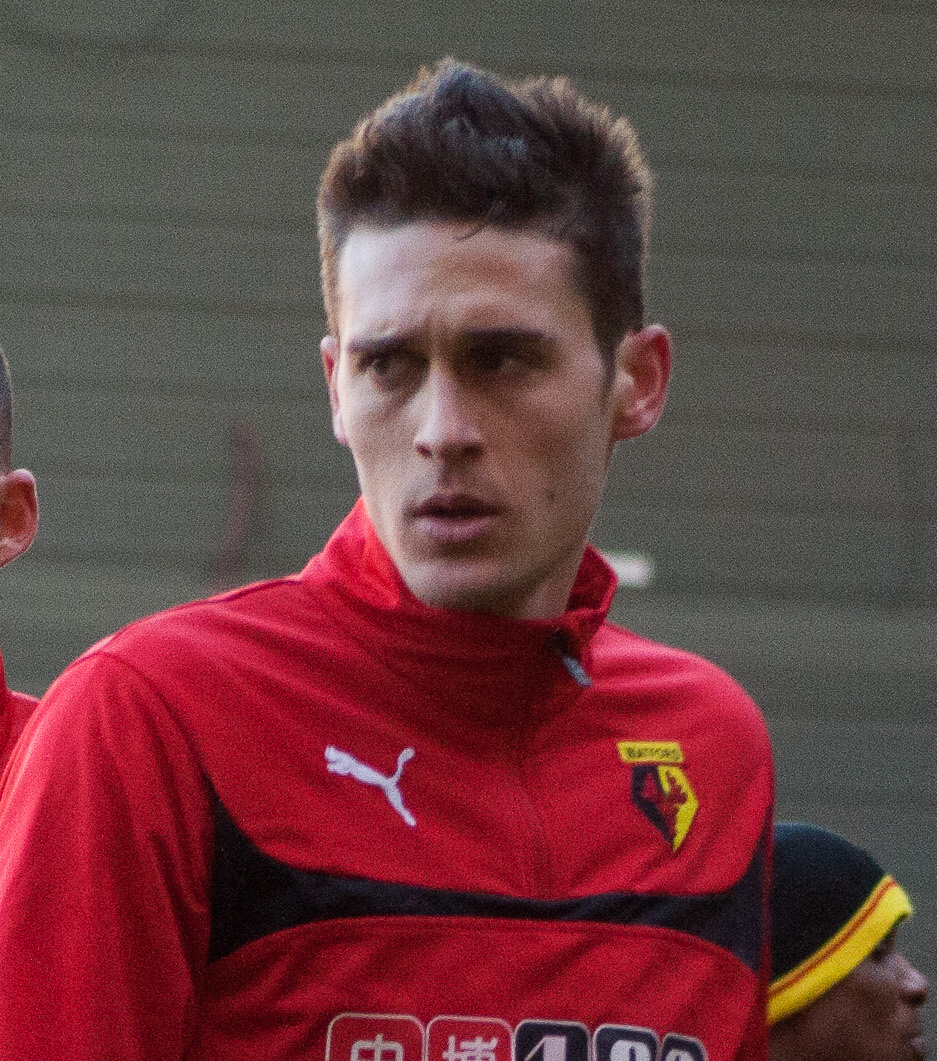

Personal information
- Full name: Gabriele Angella
- Date of birth: 28 April 1989 (age 37)
- Place of birth: Florence, Italy
- Height: 1.93 m (6 ft 4 in)
- Position: Defender

Youth career
- 2006–2008: Empoli

Senior career*
Years	Team	Apps	(Gls)
2008–2010	Empoli	48	(0)
2010–2013	Udinese	22	(4)
2011–2012	→ Siena (loan)	0	(0)
2012	→ Reggina (loan)	19	(1)
2013–2016	Watford	75	(9)
2015–2016	→ Queens Park Rangers (loan)	17	(1)
2016–2019	Udinese	26	(1)
2018–2019	→ Charleroi (loan)	22	(2)
2019–2026	Perugia	148	(3)

International career^{‡}
2009–2010	Italy U21	3	(0)
- * Club domestic league appearances and goals as of 30 April 2026 ‡ National team caps and goals as of 08:03, 3 July 2016 (UTC)

Gabriele Angella (born 28 April 1989) is an Italian professional footballer who plays as a defender.

== Club career ==
Angella began his career at Empoli in 2006 and was promoted to the first team in 2008, he played his first Serie B match on 13 September 2008, a 0–0 draw with AlbinoLeffe.

On 31 August 2010, Udinese signed him along with Diego Fabbrini in a co-ownership deal for €3 million. As part of the deal, Ricardo Chará and Flavio Lazzari joined Empoli, also in co-ownership deal for a small fee. He was loaned out to Siena for the 2011–2012 season and moved on loan to Reggina in late January 2012. In June 2013 Angella and Daniele Mori were signed outright for €350,000 each.

In July 2013, Angella joined Watford permanently on a five-year deal from Udinese, making his debut away to Birmingham City on 3 August 2013. Having opened his Watford account away to Bristol Rovers on 6 August 2013, Angella scored twice in Watford's 6–1 win over Bournemouth on 10 August 2013. On 30 January 2014, Angella scored a brace in an eventual 4–2 defeat to Nottingham Forest.

On 1 September 2015, he joined Queens Park Rangers on a season long loan from Watford. He scored his first goal for QPR in a 2–0 win over Derby County on 8 March 2016.

On 1 July 2016, Angella left Watford to rejoin Udinese on a four-year contract.

== International career ==
He made his Italy U-21 debut on 4 September 2009, starting in a 1–2 defeat against Wales in Swansea.

== Career statistics ==
As of match played 20 May 2018

Club	Season	League			National Cup		League Cup		Other		Total	
Club	Season	Division	Apps	Goals	Apps	Goals	Apps	Goals	Apps	Goals	Apps	Goals
Empoli	2008–09	Serie B	11	0	0	0	0	0	0	0	11	0
Empoli	2009–10	Serie B	35	0	0	0	2	1	0	0	37	1
Empoli	2010–11	Serie B	2	0	0	0	1	1	0	0	3	1
Empoli	Total		48	0	0	0	3	2	0	0	51	2
Udinese	2010–11	Serie A	8	0	0	0	3	1	0	0	11	1
Udinese	2012–13	Serie A	14	4	0	0	1	0	0	0	15	4
Udinese	Total		22	4	0	0	4	1	0	0	26	5
Siena (loan)	2011–12	Serie A	0	0	0	0	2	0	0	0	2	0
Reggina (loan)	2011–12	Serie B	19	1	0	0	0	0	0	0	19	1
Watford	2013–14	Championship	40	7	3	0	2	1	0	0	45	8
Watford	2014–15	Championship	35	2	1	0	0	0	0	0	36	2
Watford	2015–16	Premier League	0	0	0	0	1	0	0	0	1	0
Watford	Total		75	9	4	0	3	1	0	0	82	10
Queens Park Rangers (loan)	2015–16	Championship	17	1	1	0	0	0	0	0	18	1
Udinese	2016–17	Serie A	14	1	0	0	0	0	0	0	14	1
Udinese	2017–18	Serie A	12	0	0	0	0	0	0	0	12	0
Udinese	Total		26	1	0	0	0	0	0	0	26	1
Career total			207	16	5	0	12	4	0	0	224	20
