= Emil Hallfreðsson =

Icelandic footballer (born 1984)

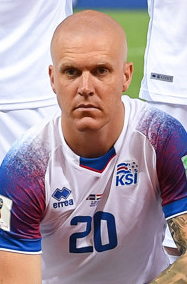
- Emil with Iceland at the 2018 FIFA World Cup

Personal information
- Full name: Emil Hallfreðsson
- Date of birth: 29 June 1984 (age 42)
- Place of birth: Hafnarfjörður, Iceland
- Height: 1.86 m (6 ft 1 in)
- Position: Midfielder

Youth career
- FH

Senior career*
Years	Team	Apps	(Gls)
2002–2004	FH	29	(7)
2005–2007	Tottenham Hotspur	0	(0)
2006	→ Malmö FF (loan)	19	(5)
2007	Lyn Oslo	1	(0)
2007–2011	Reggina	34	(1)
2009–2010	→ Barnsley (loan)	27	(3)
2010–2011	→ Verona (loan)	34	(4)
2011–2016	Verona	150	(12)
2016–2018	Udinese	58	(0)
2018–2019	Frosinone	6	(0)
2019	Udinese	3	(1)
2020–2021	Padova	35	(3)
2021–2023	Virtus Verona	45	(0)
Total		441	(36)

International career
2000	Iceland U17	7	(2)
2002	Iceland U19	3	(0)
2004–2006	Iceland U21	14	(3)
2005–2020	Iceland	73	(1)
- * Club domestic league appearances and goals

Emil Hallfreðsson (born 29 June 1984) is an Icelandic former professional footballer who played as a central midfielder or left winger.

== Club career ==
=== Early career ===
Primarily a left-sided midfielder, Emil was brought to Tottenham Hotspur by then Sporting Director Frank Arnesen in December 2004, having spent his formative years at FH Hafnarfjarðar of the Úrvalsdeild in Iceland.

Emil became a regular starter for the Tottenham Hotspur Reserves, and played a key part in the Spurs' 2005–06 Premier League Southern Reserve title win. He was then loaned out to Swedish side Malmö FF. He enjoyed some success with Malmö, starting a majority of the games in the 2006 season, with a total of 24 appearances and eight goals. He then returned to England in the fall, after Malmö unsuccessfully tried to convince him to stay.

His aim was then been to make the Spurs first team, but in his remaining months at the club he was not selected for a single game. In July 2007, he was sold to Norwegian club Lyn, where he was slated to stay until 2010. His first match for the club was a friendly against Ham-Kam, followed by a 20-minute substitution in a league game away against Sandefjord. His first and only 90-minute appearance was against Bodø/Glimt in the Norwegian Cup, in which he delivered a fine cross to Dylan Macallister for the 1–0 goal and the win. Three days later, the club surprisingly announced that Emil would be leaving for Italy and Reggina.

=== Reggina ===
Emil played his first Serie A match on 26 August 2007 a 1–1 draw with Atalanta. In his first season, he played a regular role in Reggina's team, but in the second season he played less. In April 2009 he did, however, score a spectacular goal against Juventus; he scored the 2–1 goal for his team but the match ended 2–2.

=== Barnsley ===
Having not been selected to play for Reggina first match of the 2009–10 season at Coppa Italia, he completed a one-year loan to Football League Championship side Barnsley on 14 August 2009. He scored his first goal for Barnsley against Plymouth Argyle on 28 November 2009. However, the game was later abandoned due to a waterlogged pitch. His first goal did come two weeks later however, in the home game with Newcastle United, slamming home a Daniel Bogdanović cross from six yards. Emil's goal made it 1–1 in an eventual 2–2 draw.

=== Verona ===
On 31 August 2010, Reggina loaned him to Verona. His first season with Verona he was a regular starter and a decisive player in achieving promotion to Serie B. At the end of the season, Emil won the Mastino del Bentegodi award as the team's player of the year. Looking ahead to the upcoming Serie B season, on 22 June 2011, three days after winning the First Division play-off, Verona outbid Reggina to purchase his contract.

=== Udinese ===
On 30 January 2016, Emil joined Udinese, signing a contract until June 2018.

=== Frosinone ===
On 31 July 2018, Emil signed with Serie A side Frosinone.

=== Return to Udinese ===
On 1 March 2019, Emil signed for the second time to Udinese after the first half of the season to Frosinone.

=== Padova ===
On 4 January 2020, he signed with Serie C club Padova until the end of the 2019–20 season. On 16 September 2020, he signed a new contract with Padova for the 2020–21 season.

=== Virtus Verona ===
On 6 October 2021, Emil signed a one-year contract for Serie C side Virtus Verona as a free transfer.

== International career ==
Emil was selected for EURO 2016 by the Iceland national team.

In May 2018 he was named in Iceland's 23-man squad for the 2018 World Cup in Russia.

== Career statistics ==
=== International ===
As of match played 8 September 2020

Appearances and goals by national team and year
National team	Year	Apps	Goals
Iceland	2005	1	0
Iceland	2006	3	0
Iceland	2007	9	1
Iceland	2008	8	0
Iceland	2009	7	0
Iceland	2010	1	0
Iceland	2011	0	0
Iceland	2012	5	0
Iceland	2013	5	0
Iceland	2014	7	0
Iceland	2015	4	0
Iceland	2016	6	0
Iceland	2017	5	0
Iceland	2018	6	0
Iceland	2019	4	0
Iceland	2020	2	0
Total		73	1

As of 8 September 2007
Scores and results list Iceland's goal tally first, score column indicates score after each goal Emil scored.

List of international goals scored by Emil Hallfreðsson
No.	Date	Venue	Opponent	Score	Result	Competition
1	8 September 2007	Laugardalsvöllur, Reykjavík, Iceland	Spain	1–0	1–1	UEFA Euro 2008 qualification

== Honours ==
FH

- Besta deild karla: 2004
