= Czech Republic national football team results =

The following articles contain the Czech Republic national football team results:

- Czech Republic national football team results (1994–2019)
- Czech Republic national football team results (2020–present)

== See also ==
- Czechoslovakia national football team results
