= Czechoslovakia national football team results =

The list for Czechoslovakia national football team results include:

- Czechoslovakia national football team results (1920–1938)
- Czechoslovakia national football team results (1946–1969)
- Czechoslovakia national football team results (1970–1993)

== See also ==
- Czech Republic national football team
- Czech Republic national football team results (1994–2019)
- Czech Republic national football team results (2020–present)
- Slovakia national football team
- Slovakia national football team results
