= Pavel Šulc =

Czech footballer (born 2000)

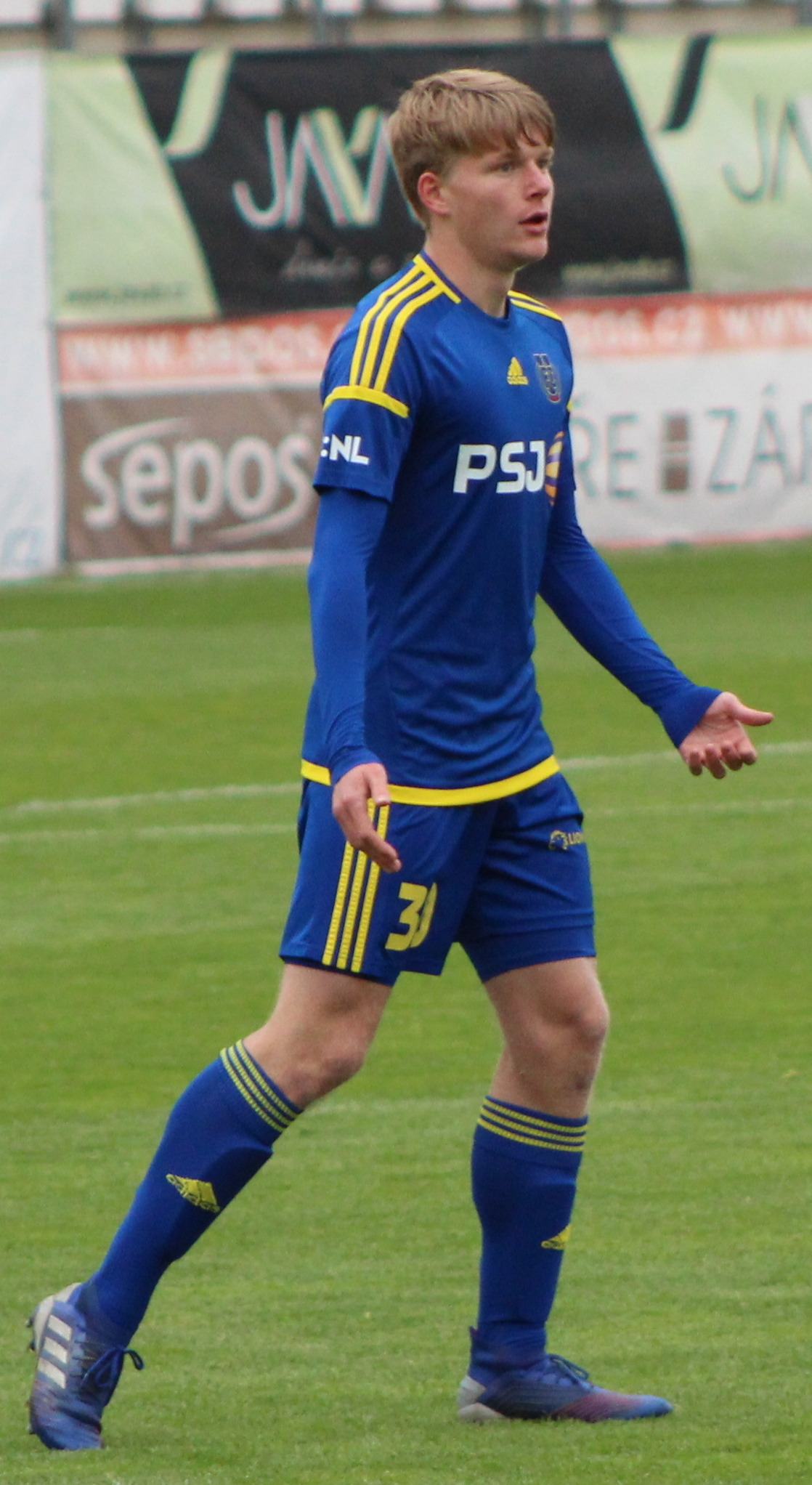
- Šulc playing for Vysočina Jihlava in 2019

Personal information
- Date of birth: 29 December 2000 (age 25)
- Place of birth: Karlovy Vary, Czech Republic
- Height: 1.77 m (5 ft 10 in)
- Position: Attacking midfielder

Team information
- Current team: Lyon
- Number: 10

Senior career*
Years	Team	Apps	(Gls)
2017–2025	Viktoria Plzeň	115	(36)
2019	→ Vysočina Jihlava (loan)	16	(3)
2019	→ Opava (loan)	15	(0)
2020	→ České Budějovice (loan)	15	(3)
2022–2023	→ Jablonec (loan)	32	(5)
2025–	Lyon	34	(12)

International career^{‡}
2017–2018	Czech Republic U18	4	(1)
2018–2019	Czech Republic U19	7	(2)
2019	Czech Republic U20	4	(1)
2019–2020	Czech Republic U21	20	(2)
2024–	Czech Republic	27	(5)
- * Club domestic league appearances and goals as of 18 October 2026 ‡ National team caps and goals as of 8 October 2026

Pavel Šulc (born 29 December 2000) is a Czech professional footballer who plays as an attacking midfielder for Ligue 1 club Lyon and the Czech Republic national team

Šulc made over 150 appearances for Viktoria Plzeň, and was named the Czech Footballer of the Year in 2025.

== Club career ==
=== Viktoria Plzeň ===
Šulc was promoted to the first team of Viktoria Plzeň in January 2020 but only played his first match on 17 January 2021 against FK Příbram.

Scoring once each season in 2020–21 and 2021–22, Šulc started the 2023–24 season with a hat-trick against České Budějovice. He contributed to Viktoria Plzeň's 2023–24 UEFA Europa Conference League campaign, where they reached the quarter-final of a European competition for the first time.

=== Loan spells ===
On 29 January 2019, Šulc was loaned to FC Vysočina Jihlava in Czech National Football League, playing he played in 16 league matches and scored 3 goals.

On 3 July 2019, he was loaned to SFC Opava in Czech First League. In six months long loan he played in 15 league matches and in 1 Czech Cup match without scoring a goal.

On 26 January 2020, he was loaned to SK Dynamo České Budějovice in Czech First League. In one year long loan he played in 15 league matches and scored 3 goals.

In June 2022, he joined Czech First League side FK Jablonec on a season-long loan, reuniting with manager David Horejš who he had worked with at České Budějovice in his previous loan spell.

=== Lyon ===
On 4 August 2025, Šulc signed a four-year contract with Lyon in France.

== International career ==
Šulc had played international football at youth levels that ranged from Czech Republic U18 to U21. He played a total of 15 matches for the U18–U20 teams and scored four times. For the U21 team, he played in 20 matches and scored two times.

On 22 March 2024, Šulc debuted for the Czech senior squad in a friendly match against Norway.

On 10 September 2024, Šulc scored his first goals for the Czech Republic, scoring twice in a 3–2 victory against Ukraine in the Nations League

On 31 May 2026, Šulc was selected in the 26-man squad for the 2026 FIFA World Cup.

== Career statistics ==
=== Club ===
As of match played 18 October 2026

Appearances and goals by club, season and competition
Club	Season	League			National cup (Note: Includes Czech Cup, Coupe de France)		Europe		Total	
Club	Season	Division	Apps	Goals	Apps	Goals	Apps	Goals	Apps	Goals
Vysočina Jihlava (loan)	2018–19	Czech National League	16	3	0	0	—		16	3
Opava (loan)	2019–20	Czech First League	15	0	3	0	—		18	0
České Budějovice (loan)	2019–20	Czech First League	11	2	—		—		11	2
České Budějovice (loan)	2020–21	Czech First League	4	1	—		—		4	1
České Budějovice (loan)	Total		15	3	—		—		15	3
Viktoria Plzeň	2020–21	Czech First League	20	1	5	0	—		25	1
Viktoria Plzeň	2021–22	Czech First League	27	1	2	1	6 (Note: Appearances in UEFA Europa Conference League)	1	35	3
Viktoria Plzeň	2023–24	Czech First League	31	18	5	2	13	2	49	22
Viktoria Plzeň	2024–25	Czech First League	35	15	3	1	16 (Note: Appearances in UEFA Europa League)	4	54	20
Viktoria Plzeň	2025–26	Czech First League	2	1	—		2 (Note: Appearances in UEFA Champions League)	0	4	1
Viktoria Plzeň	Total		115	36	15	4	37	7	167	47
Jablonec (loan)	2022–23	Czech First League	32	5	2	0	—		34	5
Lyon	2025–26	Ligue 1	27	11	3	2	8	1	38	14
Lyon	2026–27	Ligue 1	7	1	0	0	3 (Note: One appearance in UEFA Champions League, two appearances and one goal in UEFA Europa League)	1	10	2
Lyon	Total		34	12	3	2	11	2	48	16
Career total			227	59	23	6	48	9	298	73

=== International ===
As of match played 6 October 2026

Appearances and goals by national team and year
National team	Year	Apps	Goals
Czech Republic	2024	10	3
Czech Republic	2025	8	1
Czech Republic	2026	9	1
Total		27	5

Scores and results list the Czech Republic's goal tally first.

List of international goals scored by Pavel Šulc
No.	Date	Venue	Opponent	Score	Result	Competition
1	10 September 2024	Fortuna Arena, Prague, Czech Republic	Ukraine	1–0	3–2	2024–25 UEFA Nations League B
2	10 September 2024	Fortuna Arena, Prague, Czech Republic	Ukraine	2–1	3–2	2024–25 UEFA Nations League B
3	19 November 2024	Andrův stadion, Olomouc, Czech Republic	Georgia	1–0	2–1	2024–25 UEFA Nations League B
4	25 March 2025	Estádio Algarve, Faro/Loulé, Portugal	Gibraltar	3–0	4–0	2026 FIFA World Cup qualification
5	31 March 2026	Stadion Letná, Prague, Czechia	Denmark	1–0	2–2 (a.e.t.) (3–1 p)	2026 FIFA World Cup qualification play-offs

== Honours ==
Viktoria Plzeň

- Czech First League: 2021–22

Individual

- Czech Golden Ball: 2025
- Czech Footballer of the Year: 2025
