= FC Viktoria Plzeň in European football =

- Club: Viktoria Plzeň
- First entry: 1971–72 European Cup Winners' Cup
- Latest entry: 2026–27 UEFA Europa League

FC Viktoria Plzeň is a Czech association football club from Plzeň. The club has participated in sixteen seasons of UEFA club competitions, including two seasons in the UEFA Champions League, three seasons in the UEFA Cup and UEFA Europa League and one season in the UEFA Cup Winners' Cup. The club has played 42 UEFA matches, resulting in 24 wins, 6 draws and 12 defeats. The club's first appearance was in the 1971–72 European Cup Winners' Cup. The club's best performance is reaching the round of 16 of the Europa League, which they managed in the 2012–13 season; they later repeated the performance in the 2013–14 and 2017–18 seasons.

The club plays its home matches at Stadion města Plzně, an all-seater stadium in Plzeň. During the 2011–12 season, the club played European matches at Eden Arena in Prague due to the reconstruction of Plzeň's stadium during the play-off round and group stage of the Champions League.

== Key ==
- S = Seasons
- Pld = Matches played
- W = Matches won
- D = Matches drawn
- L = Matches lost
- GF = Goals for
- GA = Goals against
- a.e.t. = Match determined after extra time
- a = Match determined by away goals rule
- QF = Quarter-finals
- Group = Group stage
- Group 2 = Second group stage
- PO = Play-off round
- KPO = Knockout phase play-offs
- R3 = Round 3
- R2 = Round 2
- R1 = Round 1
- Q3 = Third qualification round
- Q2 = Second qualification round
- Q1 = First qualification round
- Q = Qualification round

== All-time statistics ==
The statistics include qualification matches and is up to date as of 31 August 2023.

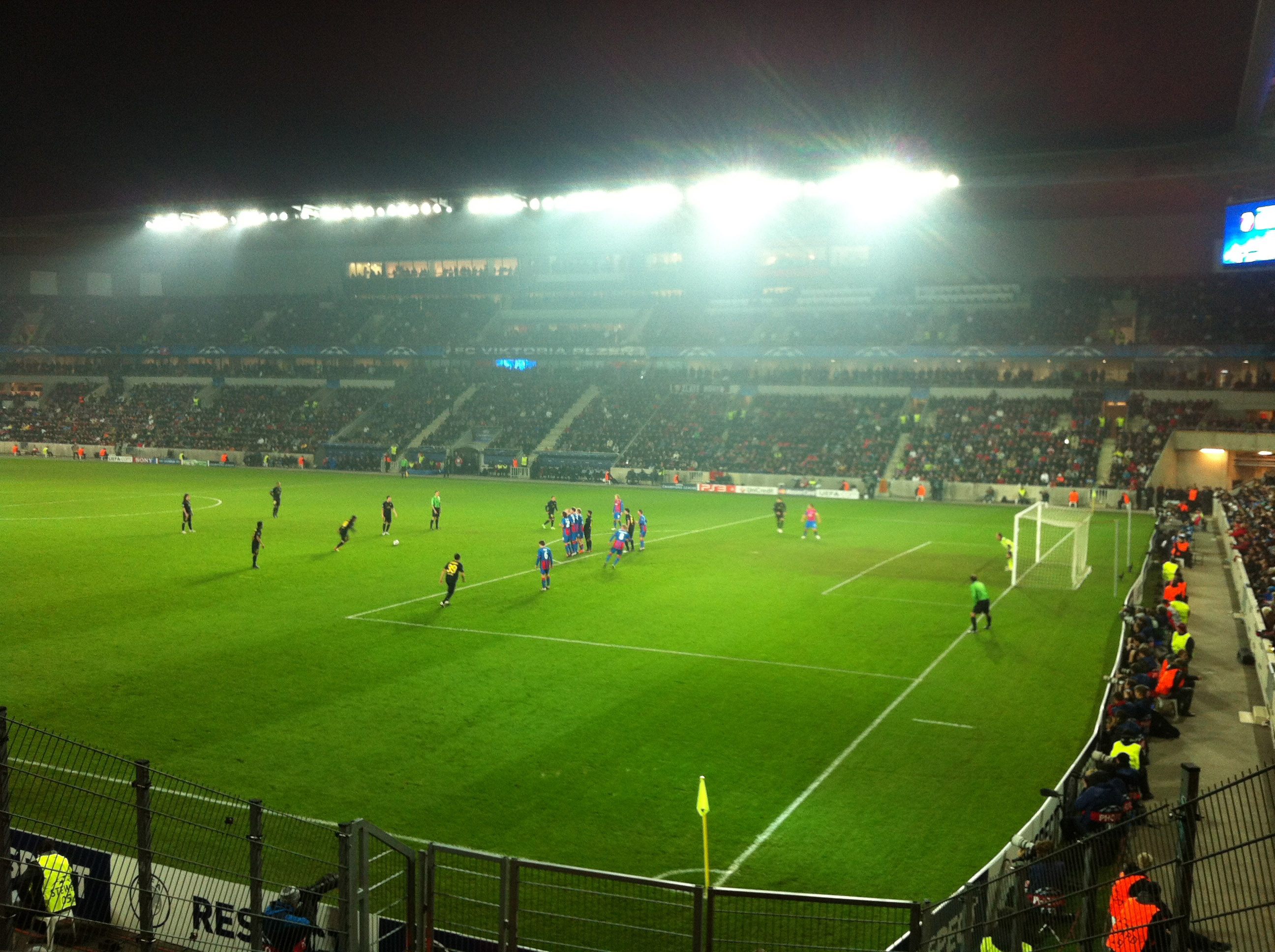
Viktoria Plzeň–Barcelona 0–4 at Synot Tip Arena on 1 November 2011

The following is a list of the all-time statistics from Viktoria Plzeň's matches in the four UEFA tournaments it has participated in, as well as the overall total. The list contains the tournament, the number of seasons (S), matches played (Pld), won (W), drawn (D) and lost (L), as well as goals for (GF), goals against (GA) and goal difference (GD).

Competition	S	Pld	W	D	L	GF	GA	GD
Champions League	4	53	22	9	22	82	105	-23
Cup Winners' Cup	1	2	0	0	2	1	7	–6
Europa League	8	58	27	12	19	90	69	+21
Conference League	2	12	9	1	2	24	12	+12
Total	15	125	58	22	45	197	193	+4

=== Matches ===
The following is a complete list of matches played by Viktoria Plzeň in UEFA tournaments. It includes the season, tournament, the stage, the opponent club and its country, the date, the venue and the score, with Viktoria Plzeň's score noted first. It is up to date as of 26 February 2026.

List of FC Viktoria Plzeň matches in European football
Season	Tournament	Stage	Opponent		Date	Venue	Score	Attendance
Season	Tournament	Stage	Team	Country	Date	Venue	Score	Attendance
1971–72	Cup Winners' Cup	R1	Bayern Munich	West Germany	15 September 1971	Stadion města Plzně, Plzeň	0–1	30,000
1971–72	Cup Winners' Cup	R1	Bayern Munich	West Germany	29 September 1971	Munich	1–6	6,000
2010–11	Europa League	Q3	Beşiktaş	Turkey	29 July 2010	Generali Arena, Prague	1–1	5,875
2010–11	Europa League	Q3	Beşiktaş	Turkey	5 August 2010	BJK İnönü Stadium, Istanbul	0–3	25,975
2011–12	Champions League	Q2	Pyunik	Armenia	12 July 2011	Hanrapetakan Stadium, Yerevan	4–0	3,000
2011–12	Champions League	Q2	Pyunik	Armenia	19 July 2011	Stadion města Plzně, Plzeň	5–1	5,400
2011–12	Champions League	Q3	Rosenborg	Norway	27 July 2011	Lerkendal Stadion, Trondheim	1–0	8,028
2011–12	Champions League	Q3	Rosenborg	Norway	3 August 2011	Stadion města Plzně, Plzeň	3–2	5,124
2011–12	Champions League	PO	Copenhagen	Denmark	16 August 2011	Parken Stadium, Copenhagen	3–1	
2011–12	Champions League	PO	Copenhagen	Denmark	24 August 2011	Synot Tip Arena, Prague	2–1	19,350
2011–12	Champions League	Group H	BATE Borisov	Belarus	13 September 2011	Synot Tip Arena, Prague	1–1	19,541
2011–12	Champions League	Group H	Milan	Italy	28 September 2011	San Siro, Milan	0–2	66,859
2011–12	Champions League	Group H	Barcelona	Spain	19 October 2011	Camp Nou, Barcelona	0–2	74,375
2011–12	Champions League	Group H	Barcelona	Spain	1 November 2011	Synot Tip Arena, Prague	0–4	20,145
2011–12	Champions League	Group H	BATE Borisov	Belarus	23 November 2011	Dynama Stadium, Minsk	1–0	26,520
2011–12	Champions League	Group H	Milan	Italy	6 December 2011	Synot Tip Arena, Prague	2–2	19,854
2011–12	Europa League	Round of 32	Schalke 04	Germany	16 February 2012	Stadion města Plzně, Plzeň	1–1	11,435
2011–12	Europa League	Round of 32	Schalke 04	Germany	23 February 2012	Veltins-Arena, Gelsenkirchen	1–3 (a.e.t.)	54,142
2012–13	Europa League	Q2	Metalurgi Rustavi	(Georgia (country)) Georgia	19 July 2012	Mikheil Meskhi Stadium, Tbilisi	3–1	2,995
2012–13	Europa League	Q2	Metalurgi Rustavi	(Georgia (country)) Georgia	26 July 2012	Stadion města Plzně, Plzeň	2–0	11,446
2012–13	Europa League	Q3	Ruch Chorzów	Poland	2 August 2012	Stadion Ruchu, Chorzów	2–0	3,824
2012–13	Europa League	Q3	Ruch Chorzów	Poland	9 August 2012	Stadion města Plzně, Plzeň	5–0	11,651
2012–13	Europa League	PO	Lokeren	Belgium	23 August 2012	King Baudouin Stadium, Brussels	1–2	4,254
2012–13	Europa League	PO	Lokeren	Belgium	30 August 2012	Stadion města Plzně, Plzeň	1–0 (a)	11,711
2012–13	Europa League	Group B	Académica de Coimbra	Portugal	20 September 2012	Stadion města Plzně, Plzeň	3–1	10,848
2012–13	Europa League	Group B	Atlético Madrid	Spain	4 October 2012	Vicente Calderón, Madrid	0–1	19,772
2012–13	Europa League	Group B	Hapoel Tel Aviv	Israel	4 October 2012	Bloomfield Stadium, Tel Aviv	2–1	12,248
2012–13	Europa League	Group B	Hapoel Tel Aviv	Israel	8 November 2012	Stadion města Plzně, Plzeň	4–0	11,389
2012–13	Europa League	Group B	Académica de Coimbra	Portugal	22 November 2012	Estádio Cidade de Coimbra, Coimbra	1–1	3,717
2012–13	Europa League	Group B	Atlético Madrid	Spain	4 October 2012	Stadion města Plzně, Plzeň	1–0	11,067
2012–13	Europa League	Round of 32	Napoli	Italy	14 February 2013	Stadio San Paolo, Naples	3–0	15,000
2012–13	Europa League	Round of 32	Napoli	Italy	21 February 2013	Stadion města Plzně, Plzeň	2–0	11,607
2012–13	Europa League	Round of 16	Fenerbahçe	Turkey	7 March 2013	Stadion města Plzně, Plzeň	0–1	11,701
2012–13	Europa League	Round of 16	Fenerbahçe	Turkey	14 March 2013	Şükrü Saracoğlu Stadium, Istanbul	1–1	0
2013–14	Champions League	Q2	Željezničar	Bosnia and Herzegovina	16 July 2013	Stadion města Plzně, Plzeň	4–3	10,381
2013–14	Champions League	Q2	Željezničar	Bosnia and Herzegovina	23 July 2013	Asim Ferhatović Hase Stadium, Sarajevo	2–1	25,000
2013–14	Champions League	Q3	Nõmme Kalju	Estonia	30 July 2013	Lilleküla Stadium, Tallinn	4–0	4,420
2013–14	Champions League	Q3	Nõmme Kalju	Estonia	7 August 2013	Stadion města Plzně, Plzeň	6–2	9,482
2013–14	Champions League	PO	Maribor	Slovenia	20 August 2013	Stadion města Plzně, Plzeň	3–1	11,158
2013–14	Champions League	PO	Maribor	Slovenia	28 August 2013	Ljudski vrt, Maribor	1–0	12,306
2013–14	Champions League	Group D	Manchester City	England	17 September 2013	Stadion města Plzně, Plzeň	0–3	11,281
2013–14	Champions League	Group D	CSKA Moscow	Russia	2 October 2013	Petrovsky Stadium, Saint Petersburg	2–3	6,000
2013–14	Champions League	Group D	Bayern Munich	Germany	23 October 2013	Allianz Arena, Munich	0–5	71,000
2013–14	Champions League	Group D	Bayern Munich	Germany	5 November 2013	Stadion města Plzně, Plzeň	0–1	11,360
2013–14	Champions League	Group D	Manchester City	England	27 November 2013	City of Manchester Stadium, Manchester	2–4	37,742
2013–14	Champions League	Group D	CSKA Moscow	Russia	10 December 2013	Stadion města Plzně, Plzeň	2–1	11,205
2013–14	Europa League	Round of 32	Shakhtar Donetsk	Ukraine	20 February 2014	Stadion města Plzně, Plzeň	1–1	11,179
2013–14	Europa League	Round of 32	Shakhtar Donetsk	Ukraine	27 February 2014	Donbass Arena, Donetsk	2–1	36,729
2013–14	Europa League	Round of 16	Lyon	France	13 March 2014	Stade de Gerland, Lyon	1–4	28,248
2013–14	Europa League	Round of 16	Lyon	France	20 March 2014	Stadion města Plzně, Plzeň	2–1	10,352
2014–15	Europa League	Q3	Petrolul Ploiești	Romania	31 July 2014	Stadionul Ilie Oană, Ploiești	1–1	11,244
2014–15	Europa League	Q3	Petrolul Ploiești	Romania	7 August 2014	Stadion města Plzně, Plzeň	1–4	10,521
2015–16	Champions League	Q3	Maccabi Tel Aviv	Israel	28 July 2015	Bloomfield Stadium, Tel Aviv	2–1	13,420
2015–16	Champions League	Q3	Maccabi Tel Aviv	Israel	5 August 2015	Stadion města Plzně, Plzeň	0–2	11,242
2015–16	Europa League	PO	Vojvodina	Serbia	20 August 2015	Stadion města Plzně, Plzeň	3–0	10,769
2015–16	Europa League	PO	Vojvodina	Serbia	27 August 2015	Karađorđe Stadium, Novi Sad	2–0	7,617
2015–16	Europa League	Group E	Dinamo Minsk	Belarus	17 September 2015	Stadion města Plzně, Plzeň	2–0	10,784
2015–16	Europa League	Group E	Villarreal	Spain	1 October 2015	Estadio El Madrigal, Villarreal	0–1	17,481
2015–16	Europa League	Group E	Rapid Wien	Austria	22 October 2015	Ernst Happel Stadium, Vienna	2–3	39,400
2015–16	Europa League	Group E	Rapid Wien	Austria	5 November 2015	Stadion města Plzně, Plzeň	1–2	11,691
2015–16	Europa League	Group E	Dinamo Minsk	Belarus	26 November 2015	Borisov Arena, Barysaw	0–1	4,250
2015–16	Europa League	Group E	Villarreal	Spain	10 December 2015	Stadion města Plzně, Plzeň	3–3	10,071
2016–17	Champions League	Q3	Qarabağ	Azerbaijan	26 July 2016	Stadion města Plzně, Plzeň	0–0	10,269
2016–17	Champions League	Q3	Qarabağ	Azerbaijan	2 August 2016	Tofiq Bahramov Republican Stadium, Baku	1–1 (a)	30,792
2016–17	Champions League	PO	Ludogorets Razgrad	Bulgaria	17 August 2016	Vasil Levski National Stadium, Sofia	0–2	11,812
2016–17	Champions League	PO	Ludogorets Razgrad	Bulgaria	23 August 2016	Stadion města Plzně, Plzeň	2–2	10,312
2016–17	Europa League	Group E	Roma	Italy	15 September 2016	Stadion města Plzně, Plzeň	1–1	10,326
2016–17	Europa League	Group E	Austria Wien	Austria	29 September 2016	Ernst Happel Stadium, Vienna	0–0	16,509
2016–17	Europa League	Group E	Astra Giurgiu	Romania	20 October 2016	Stadion města Plzně, Plzeň	1–2	9,440
2016–17	Europa League	Group E	Astra Giurgiu	Romania	3 November 2016	Arena Națională, Bucharest	1–1	1,450
2016–17	Europa League	Group E	Roma	Italy	24 November 2016	Stadio Olimpico, Rome	1–4	13,789
2016–17	Europa League	Group E	Austria Wien	Austria	8 December 2016	Stadion města Plzně, Plzeň	3–2	9,117
2017–18	Champions League	Q3	FCSB	Romania	26 July 2017	Arena Națională, Bucharest	2–2	33,000
2017–18	Champions League	Q3	FCSB	Romania	2 August 2017	Stadion města Plzně, Plzeň	1–4	10,802
2017–18	Europa League	PO	AEK Larnaca	Cyprus	17 August 2017	Stadion města Plzně, Plzeň	3–1	10,031
2017–18	Europa League	PO	AEK Larnaca	Cyprus	24 August 2017	AEK Arena, Larnaca	0–0	5,300
2017–18	Europa League	Group G	FCSB	Romania	14 September 2017	Arena Națională, Bucharest	0–3	20,717
2017–18	Europa League	Group G	Hapoel Be'er Sheva	Israel	28 September 2017	Doosan Arena, Plzeň	3–1	10,314
2017–18	Europa League	Group G	Lugano	Switzerland	19 October 2017	Swissporarena, Lucerne	2–3	2,530
2017–18	Europa League	Group G	Lugano	Switzerland	2 November 2017	Doosan Arena, Plzeň	4–1	9,483
2017–18	Europa League	Group G	FCSB	Romania	23 November 2017	Doosan Arena, Plzeň	2–0	10,197
2017–18	Europa League	Group G	Hapoel Be'er Sheva	Israel	7 December 2017	Turner Stadium, Be'er Sheva	2–0	10,542
2017–18	Europa League	Round of 32	Partizan	Serbia	15 February 2018	Partizan Stadium, Belgrade	1–1	17,165
2017–18	Europa League	Round of 32	Partizan	Serbia	22 February 2018	Doosan Arena, Plzeň	2–0	10,185
2017–18	Europa League	Round of 16	Sporting CP	Portugal	8 March 2018	Estádio José Alvalade, Lisbon	0–2	26,090
2017–18	Europa League	Round of 16	Sporting CP	Portugal	15 March 2018	Doosan Arena, Plzeň	2–1 (a.e.t.)	9,370
2018–19	Champions League	Group G	CSKA Moscow	Russia	19 September 2018	Doosan Arena, Plzeň	2–2	11,312
2018–19	Champions League	Group G	Roma	Italy	2 October 2018	Stadio Olimpico, Rome	0–5	41,243
2018–19	Champions League	Group G	Real Madrid	Spain	23 October 2018	Santiago Bernabéu, Madrid	1–2	67,356
2018–19	Champions League	Group G	Real Madrid	Spain	7 November 2018	Doosan Arena, Plzeň	0–5	11,483
2018–19	Champions League	Group G	CSKA Moscow	Russia	27 November 2018	Luzhniki Stadium, Moscow	2–1	52,892
2018–19	Champions League	Group G	Roma	Italy	12 December 2018	Doosan Arena, Plzeň	2–1	11,217
2018–19	Europa League	Round of 32	Dinamo Zagreb	Croatia	14 February 2019	Doosan Arena, Plzeň	2–1	9,731
2018–19	Europa League	Round of 32	Dinamo Zagreb	Croatia	21 February 2019	Stadion Maksimir, Zagreb	0–3	25,860
2019–20	Champions League	Q2	Olympiacos	Greece	23 July 2019	Doosan Arena, Plzeň	0–0	10,632
2019–20	Champions League	Q2	Olympiacos	Greece	30 July 2019	Karaiskakis Stadium, Piraeus	0−4	30,123
2019–20	Europa League	Q3	Antwerp	Belgium	8 August 2019	King Baudouin Stadium, Brussels	0–1	15,734
2019–20	Europa League	Q3	Antwerp	Belgium	15 August 2019	Doosan Arena, Plzeň	2–1 (a.e.t.) (a)	
2020–21	Champions League	Q2	AZ	Netherlands	26 August 2020	AFAS Stadion, Alkmaar	1−3 (a.e.t.)	0
2020–21	Europa League	Q3	SønderjyskE	Denmark	17 September 2020	Doosan Arena, Plzeň	3−0	0
2020–21	Europa League	PO	Hapoel Be'er Sheva	Israel	1 October 2020	HaMoshava Stadium, Petah Tikva	0−1	0
2021–22	Europa Conference League	Q2	Dynamo Brest	Belarus	22 July 2021	Doosan Arena, Plzeň	2–1	4,468
2021–22	Europa Conference League	Q2	Dynamo Brest	Belarus	29 July 2021	Yerevan Football Academy, Yerevan	2−1	0
2021–22	Europa Conference League	Q3	The New Saints	Wales	5 August 2021	Cardiff City Stadium, Cardiff	2–4	345
2021–22	Europa Conference League	Q3	The New Saints	Wales	12 August 2021	Doosan Arena, Plzeň	3–1 (a.e.t.) (4−1 p)	6,079
2021–22	Europa Conference League	PO	CSKA Sofia	Bulgaria	19 August 2021	Doosan Arena, Plzeň	2–0	6,859
2021–22	Europa Conference League	PO	CSKA Sofia	Bulgaria	26 August 2021	Vasil Levski National Stadium, Sofia	0–3 (a.e.t.)	6,717
2022–23	Champions League	Q2	HJK	Finland	20 July 2022	Bolt Arena, Helsinki	2–1	5,236
2022–23	Champions League	Q2	HJK	Finland	26 July 2022	Doosan Arena, Plzeň	5–0	10,810
2022–23	Champions League	Q3	Sheriff Tiraspol	Moldova	2 August 2022	Zimbru Stadium, Chișinău	2–1	8,153
2022–23	Champions League	Q3	Sheriff Tiraspol	Moldova	9 August 2022	Doosan Arena, Plzeň	2–1	10,770
2022–23	Champions League	PO	Qarabağ	Azerbaijan	17 August 2022	Tofiq Bahramov Republican Stadium, Baku	0–0	31,150
2022–23	Champions League	PO	Qarabağ	Azerbaijan	23 August 2022	Doosan Arena, Plzeň	2–1	10,963
2022–23	Champions League	Group C	Barcelona	Spain	7 September 2022	Camp Nou, Barcelona	1–5	77,411
2022–23	Champions League	Group C	Inter Milan	Italy	13 September 2022	Doosan Arena, Plzeň	0–2	11,252
2022–23	Champions League	Group C	Bayern Munich	Germany	4 October 2022	Allianz Arena, Munich	0–5	75,000
2022–23	Champions League	Group C	Bayern Munich	Germany	12 October 2022	Doosan Arena, Plzeň	2–4	11,326
2022–23	Champions League	Group C	Inter Milan	Italy	26 October 2022	San Siro, Milan	0–4	71,849
2022–23	Champions League	Group C	Barcelona	Spain	1 November 2022	Doosan Arena, Plzeň	2–4	11,258
2023–24	Europa Conference League	Q2	Drita	Kosovo	27 July 2023	Doosan Arena, Plzeň	0–0	10,334
2023–24	Europa Conference League	Q2	Drita	Kosovo	3 August 2023	Fadil Vokrri Stadium, Pristina	2–1	8,000
2023–24	Europa Conference League	Q3	Gżira United	Malta	10 August 2023	Doosan Arena, Plzeň	4–0	10,142
2023–24	Europa Conference League	Q3	Gżira United	Malta	17 August 2023	National Stadium, Ta' Qali	2–0	365
2023–24	Europa Conference League	PO	Tobol	Kazakhstan	24 August 2023	Central Stadium, Kostanay	2–1	8,420
2023–24	Europa Conference League	PO	Tobol	Kazakhstan	31 August 2023	Doosan Arena, Plzeň	3–0	11,069
2023–24	Europa Conference League	Group C	Ballkani	Kosovo	21 September 2023	Doosan Arena, Plzeň	1–0	9,562
2023–24	Europa Conference League	Group C	Astana	Kazakhstan	5 October 2023	Astana Arena, Astana	2–1	24,421
2023–24	Europa Conference League	Group C	Dinamo Zagreb	Croatia	26 October 2023	Stadion Maksimir, Zagreb	1–0	8,407
2023–24	Europa Conference League	Group C	Dinamo Zagreb	Croatia	9 November 2023	Doosan Arena, Plzeň	1–0	11,084
2023–24	Europa Conference League	Group C	Ballkani	Kosovo	30 November 2023	Arena Kombëtare, Tirana	1–0	2,200
2023–24	Europa Conference League	Group C	Astana	Kazakhstan	14 December 2023	Doosan Arena, Plzeň	3–0	8,135
2023–24	Europa Conference League	Round of 16	Servette	Switzerland	7 March 2024	Stade de Genève, Geneva	0–0	15,354
2023–24	Europa Conference League	Round of 16	Servette	Switzerland	14 March 2024	Doosan Arena, Plzeň	0–0 (a.e.t.) (3−1 p)	11,225
2023–24	Europa Conference League	QF	Fiorentina	Italy	11 April 2024	Doosan Arena, Plzeň	0–0	11,470
2023–24	Europa Conference League	QF	Fiorentina	Italy	18 April 2024	Stadio Artemio Franchi, Florence	0–2 (a.e.t.)	19,418
2024–25	Europa League	Q3	Kryvbas Kryvyi Rih	Ukraine	8 August 2024	Košická futbalová aréna, Košice	2–1	1,800
2024–25	Europa League	Q3	Kryvbas Kryvyi Rih	Ukraine	15 August 2024	Doosan Arena, Plzeň	1–0	10,657
2024–25	Europa League	PO	Heart of Midlothian	Scotland	22 August 2024	Doosan Arena, Plzeň	1–0	10,506
2024–25	Europa League	PO	Heart of Midlothian	Scotland	29 August 2024	Tynecastle Park, Edinburgh	1–0	18,164
2024–25	Europa League	League phase	Eintracht Frankfurt	Germany	26 September 2024	Waldstadion, Frankfurt	3–3	56,500
2024–25	Europa League	League phase	Ludogorets Razgrad	Bulgaria	3 October 2024	Doosan Arena, Plzeň	0–0	10,317
2024–25	Europa League	League phase	PAOK	Greece	24 October 2024	Toumba Stadium, Thessaloniki	2–2	16,144
2024–25	Europa League	League phase	Real Sociedad	Spain	7 November 2024	Doosan Arena, Plzeň	2–1	11,130
2024–25	Europa League	League phase	Dynamo Kyiv	Ukraine	28 November 2024	Volksparkstadion, Hamburg	2–1	4,456
2024–25	Europa League	League phase	Manchester United	England	12 December 2024	Doosan Arena, Plzeň	1–2	11,320
2024–25	Europa League	League phase	Anderlecht	Belgium	23 January 2025	Doosan Arena, Plzeň	2–0	10,972
2024–25	Europa League	League phase	Athletic Bilbao	Spain	30 January 2025	San Mamés, Bilbao	1–3	45,471
2024–25	Europa League	KPO	Ferencváros	Hungary	13 February 2025	Ferencváros Stadion, Budapest	0–1	18,519
2024–25	Europa League	KPO	Ferencváros	Hungary	20 February 2025	Doosan Arena, Plzeň	3–0	10,415
2024–25	Europa League	Round of 16	Lazio	Italy	6 March 2025	Doosan Arena, Plzeň	1–2	11,236
2024–25	Europa League	Round of 16	Lazio	Italy	13 March 2025	Stadio Olimpico, Rome	1–1	39,547
2025–26	Champions League	Q2	Servette	Switzerland	22 July 2025	Doosan Arena, Plzeň	0–1	11,055
2025–26	Champions League	Q2	Servette	Switzerland	30 July 2025	Stade de Genève, Geneva	3−1	11,716
2025–26	Champions League	Q3	Rangers	Scotland	5 August 2025	Ibrox Stadium, Glasgow	0–3	45,730
2025–26	Champions League	Q3	Rangers	Scotland	12 August 2025	Doosan Arena, Plzeň	2−1	11,341
2025–26	Europa League	League phase	Ferencváros	Hungary	25 September 2025	Ferencváros Stadion, Budapest	1–1	16,117
2025–26	Europa League	League phase	Malmö FF	Sweden	2 October 2025	Doosan Arena, Plzeň	3−0	10,811
2025–26	Europa League	League phase	Roma	Italy	23 October 2025	Stadio Olimpico, Rome	2−1	52,263
2025–26	Europa League	League phase	Fenerbahçe	Turkey	6 November 2025	Doosan Arena, Plzeň	0–0	11,090
2025–26	Europa League	League phase	SC Freiburg	Germany	27 November 2025	Doosan Arena, Plzeň	0–0	10,182
2025–26	Europa League	League phase	Panathinaikos	Greece	11 December 2025	Olympic Stadium, Athens	0–0	17,335
2025–26	Europa League	League phase	Porto	Portugal	22 January 2026	Doosan Arena, Plzeň	1–1	11,108
2025–26	Europa League	League phase	Basel	Switzerland	29 January 2026	St. Jakob-Park, Basel	1−0	20,454
2025–26	Europa League	KPO	Panathinaikos	Greece	19 February 2026	Olympic Stadium, Athens	2–2	20,227
2025–26	Europa League	KPO	Panathinaikos	Greece	26 February 2026	Doosan Arena, Plzeň	1–1 (a.e.t.) (3–4 p)	11,244
2026–27	Europa League	PO			20 August 2026			
2026–27	Europa League	PO			27 August 2026			
