= Czech Republic national football team results (2020–present) =

This article provides details of international football games played by the Czech Republic national football team from 2020 to present.

== Results ==
Key
Win
Draw
Defeat

=== 2020 ===
26 March 2020 Friendly	Mexico	Cancelled	Czech Republic	Charlotte, United States
20:00 UTC−5				Stadium: Bank of America Stadium
Note: The match was cancelled due to the COVID-19 pandemic.

30 March 2020 Friendly	Honduras	Cancelled	Czech Republic	Fort Lauderdale, United States
16:00 UTC−4				Stadium: Lockhart Stadium
Note: The match was cancelled due to the COVID-19 pandemic.

7 June 2020 Friendly	Czech Republic	Cancelled	Austria	Prague, Czech Republic
18:00 UTC+2
Note: The match was cancelled due to the COVID-19 pandemic.

4 September 2020 2020–21 Nations League	Slovakia	1–3	Czech Republic	Bratislava, Slovakia
20:45 UTC+2	Schranz 88'	Report	Coufal 48'; Dočkal 53' (pen.); Krmenčík 86'	Stadium: Tehelné pole Attendance: 0 (Note: Due to the COVID-19 pandemic in Europe, all matches scheduled for September 2020 were played behind closed doors.); Referee: Andris Treimanis (Latvia)

7 September 2020 2020–21 Nations League	Czech Republic	1–2	Scotland	Olomouc, Czech Republic
20:45 UTC+2	Pešek 12'	Report	Dykes 27'; Christie 52' (pen.)	Stadium: Andrův stadion Attendance: 0 Referee: Serdar Gözübüyük (Netherlands)

7 October 2020 Friendly	Cyprus	1–2	Czech Republic	Larnaca, Cyprus
19:00 UTC+3	Loizou 32'	Report	Holeš 13'; Darida 43' (pen.)	Stadium: AEK Arena; Attendance: 0 Referee: Lionel Tschudi (Switzerland)

11 October 2020 2020–21 Nations League	Israel	1–2	Czech Republic	Haifa, Israel
21:45 UTC+3	Zahavi 56'	Report	Abu Hanna 14' (o.g.); Vydra 48'	Stadium: Sammy Ofer Stadium; Attendance: 0 Referee: Tiago Martins (Portugal)

14 October 2020 2020–21 Nations League	Scotland	1–0	Czech Republic	Glasgow, Scotland
19:45 UTC+1	Fraser 6'	Report		Stadium: Hampden Park; Attendance: 299; Referee: Felix Zwayer (Germany)

11 November 2020 Friendly	Germany	1–0	Czech Republic	Leipzig, Germany
20:45 UTC+1	Waldschmidt 13'	Report		Stadium: Red Bull Arena; Attendance: 0 Referee: Andris Treimanis (Latvia)

15 November 2020 2020–21 Nations League	Czech Republic	1–0	Israel	Plzeň, Czech Republic
20:45 UTC+1	Darida 7'	Report		Stadium: Doosan Arena; Attendance: 0 Referee: Srđan Jovanović (Serbia)

18 November 2020 2020–21 Nations League	Czech Republic	2–0	Slovakia	Plzeň, Czech Republic
20:45 UTC+1	Souček 17'; Ondrášek 55'	Report		Stadium: Doosan Arena; Attendance: 0 Referee: Cüneyt Çakır (Turkey)

=== 2021 ===
24 March 2021 2022 World Cup qualification	Estonia	2–6	Czech Republic	Lublin, Poland
21:45 UTC+2	Sappinen 12'; Anier 86'	Report	Schick 18'; Barák 27'; Souček 32', 43', 48'; Jankto 56'	Stadium: Arena Lublin; Attendance: 0 Referee: Anastasios Papapetrou (Greece)

27 March 2021 2022 World Cup qualification	Czech Republic	1–1	Belgium	Prague, Czech Republic
20:45 UTC+1	Provod 50'	Report	R. Lukaku 60'	Stadium: Eden Arena; Attendance: 0 Referee: Willie Collum (Scotland)

30 March 2021 2022 World Cup qualification	Wales	1–0	Czech Republic	Cardiff, Wales
19:45 UTC+1	James 82'	Report		Stadium: Cardiff City Stadium; Attendance: 0 Referee: Ovidiu Haţegan (Romania)

4 June 2021 Friendly	Italy	4–0	Czech Republic	Bologna, Italy
20:45 UTC+2	Immobile 23'; Barella 42'; Insigne 66'; Berardi 73'	Report		Stadium: Stadio Renato Dall'Ara; Attendance: 0 Referee: Lionel Tschudi (Switzerland)
Note: The match was originally scheduled for 4 June 2020, but was postponed due to the COVID-19 pandemic in Italy.

8 June 2021 Friendly	Czech Republic	3–1	Albania	Prague, Czech Republic
20:15 UTC+2	Schick 18'; Masopust 68'; Čelůstka 89'	Report	Cikalleshi 42'	Stadium: Stadion Letná; Attendance: 620; Referee: Peter Král'ovič (Slovakia)

14 June 2021 Euro 2020 Group D	Scotland	0–2	Czech Republic	Glasgow, Scotland
14:00 UTC+1		Report	Schick 42', 52'	Stadium: Hampden Park; Attendance: 9,847; Referee: Daniel Siebert (Germany)

18 June 2021 Euro 2020 Group D	Croatia	1–1	Czech Republic	Glasgow, Scotland
17:00 UTC+1	Perišić 47'	Report	Schick 37' (pen.)	Stadium: Hampden Park; Attendance: 5,607; Referee: Carlos del Cerro Grande (Spain)

22 June 2021 Euro 2020 Group D	Czech Republic	0–1	England	London, England
20:00 UTC+1		Report	Sterling 12'	Stadium: Wembley Stadium; Attendance: 19,104; Referee: Artur Soares Dias (Portugal)

27 June 2021 Euro 2020 Round of 16	Netherlands	0–2	Czech Republic	Budapest, Hungary
18:00 UTC+2		Report	Holeš 68'; Schick 80'	Stadium: Puskás Aréna; Attendance: 52,834; Referee: Sergei Karasev (Russia)

3 July 2021 Euro 2020 Quarter-final	Czech Republic	1–2	Denmark	Baku, Azerbaijan
20:00 UTC+4	Schick 49'	Report	Delaney 5'; Dolberg 42'	Stadium: Olympic Stadium; Attendance: 16,306; Referee: Björn Kuipers (Netherlands)

2 September 2021 2022 World Cup qualification	Czech Republic	1–0	Belarus	Ostrava, Czech Republic
20:45 UTC+2	Barák 34'	Report		Stadium: Městský stadion v Ostravě-Vítkovicích; Attendance: 7,218; Referee: Srđan Jovanović (Serbia)

5 September 2021 2022 World Cup qualification	Belgium	3–0	Czech Republic	Brussels, Belgium
20:45 UTC+2	Lukaku 8'; E. Hazard 41'; Saelemaekers 65'	Report		Stadium: King Baudouin Stadium; Attendance: 21,416; Referee: Michael Oliver (England)

8 September 2021 Friendly	Czech Republic	1–1	Ukraine	Plzeň, Czech Republic
20:45 UTC+2	Vydra 90+4'	Report	Korniyenko 27'	Stadium: Doosan Arena; Attendance: 5,231; Referee: Filip Glova (Slovakia)

8 October 2021 2022 World Cup qualification	Czech Republic	2–2	Wales	Prague, Czech Republic
20:45 UTC+2	Pešek 38'; Ward 49' (o.g.)	Report	Ramsey 36'; James 69'	Stadium: Sinobo Stadium; Attendance: 16,856; Referee: Deniz Aytekin (Germany)

11 October 2021 2022 World Cup qualification	Belarus	0–2	Czech Republic	Kazan, Russia
21:45 UTC+3		Report	Schick 22'; Hložek 65'	Stadium: Central Stadium; Attendance: 0 Referee: François Letexier (France)

11 November 2021 Friendly	Czech Republic	7–0	Kuwait	Olomouc, Czech Republic
18:30 UTC+1	Barák 26'; Pešek 45', 46'; Souček 57'; Novák 60'; Sýkora 83', 88'	Report		Stadium: Andrův stadion Attendance: 5,367; Referee: Peter Král'ovič (Slovakia)

16 November 2021 2022 World Cup qualification	Czech Republic	2–0	Estonia	Prague, Czech Republic
20:45 UTC+1	Brabec 59'; Sýkora 85'	Report		Stadium: Stadion Letná; Attendance: 10,076; Referee: Orel Grinfeld (Israel)

=== 2022 ===
24 March 2022 2022 World Cup qualification play-offs	Sweden	1–0 (a.e.t.)	Czech Republic	Solna, Sweden
20:45 UTC+1	Quaison 110'	Report		Stadium: Friends Arena; Attendance: 48,628; Referee: Michael Oliver (England)

29 March 2022 Friendly	Wales	1–1	Czech Republic	Cardiff, Wales
19:45 UTC+1	Colwill 34'	Report	Souček 32'	Stadium: Cardiff City Stadium; Attendance: 12,912; Referee: Paul Tierney (England)

2 June 2022 2022–23 Nations League	Czech Republic	2–1	Switzerland	Prague, Czech Republic
20:45 UTC+2	Kuchta 11'; Sow 58' (o.g.)	Report	Okafor 44'	Stadium: Sinobo Stadium; Attendance: 12,236; Referee: Daniel Siebert (Germany)

5 June 2022 2022–23 Nations League	Czech Republic	2–2	Spain	Prague, Czech Republic
20:45 UTC+2	Pešek 4'; Kuchta 66'	Report	Gavi 45+3'; Martínez 90'	Stadium: Sinobo Stadium; Attendance: 18,245; Referee: François Letexier (France)

9 June 2022 2022–23 Nations League	Portugal	2–0	Czech Republic	Lisbon, Portugal
19:45 UTC+1	Cancelo 33'; Guedes 38'	Report		Stadium: Estádio José Alvalade; Attendance: 44,100; Referee: Matej Jug (Slovenia)

12 June 2022 2022–23 Nations League	Spain	2–0	Czech Republic	Málaga, Spain
20:45 UTC+2	Soler 24'; Sarabia 75'	Report		Stadium: La Rosaleda; Attendance: 30,389; Referee: Cüneyt Çakır (Turkey)

24 September 2022 2022–23 Nations League	Czech Republic	0–4	Portugal	Prague, Czech Republic
20:45 UTC+2		Report	Dalot 33', 52', 82'; Fernandes 45+2'	Stadium: Sinobo Stadium; Attendance: 19,322; Referee: Srđan Jovanović (Serbia)

27 September 2022 2022–23 Nations League	Switzerland	2–1	Czech Republic	St. Gallen, Switzerland
20:45 UTC+2	Freuler 29'; Embolo 30'	Report	Schick 45'	Stadium: Kybunpark; Attendance: 13,353; Referee: Irfan Peljto (Bosnia and Herzegovina)

16 November 2022 Friendly	Czech Republic	5–0	Faroe Islands	Olomouc, Czech Republic
18:00 UTC+1	Chytil 13', 19', 23'; Černý 42'; Stronati 76'	Report		Stadium: Andrův stadion Attendance: 10,762; Referee: Martin Dohál (Slovakia)

19 November 2022 Friendly	Turkey	2–1	Czech Republic	Gaziantep, Turkey
20:00 UTC+3	Ünal 31'; Çalhanoğlu 70'	Report	Černý 56'	Stadium: Gaziantep Stadium; Attendance: 29,017; Referee: Willie Collum (Scotland)

=== 2023 ===
24 March 2023 Euro 2024 qualifying	Czech Republic	3–1	Poland	Prague, Czech Republic
20:45 UTC+2	Krejčí 1'; Čvančara 3'; Kuchta 64'	Report	D. Szymański 87'	Stadium: Fortuna Arena; Attendance: 19,045; Referee: Anastasios Sidiropoulos (Greece)

27 March 2023 Euro 2024 qualifying	Moldova	0–0	Czech Republic	Chișinău, Moldova
21:45 UTC+3		Report		Stadium: Zimbru Stadium; Attendance: 5,120; Referee: Daniel Schlager (Germany)

17 June 2023 Euro 2024 qualifying	Faroe Islands	0–3	Czech Republic	Tórshavn, Faroe Islands
19:45 UTC+1		Report	Krejčí 15'; Černý 44', 75'	Stadium: Tórsvøllur; Attendance: 2,232; Referee: Arda Kardeşler (Turkey)

20 June 2023 Friendly	Montenegro	1–4	Czech Republic	Podgorica, Montenegro
20:45 UTC+2	Camaj 66'	Report	Chytil 28'; M. Sadílek 57'; Provod 75'; Hložek 85'	Stadium: Podgorica City Stadium; Attendance: 1,792; Referee: Matthew De Gabriele (Malta)

7 September 2023 Euro 2024 qualifying	Czech Republic	1–1	Albania	Prague, Czech Republic
20:45 UTC+2	Černý 56'	Report	Bajrami 66'	Stadium: Fortuna Arena; Attendance: 18,641; Referee: Anthony Taylor (England)

10 September 2023 Friendly	Hungary	1–1	Czech Republic	Budapest, Hungary
18:00 UTC+2	Sallai 52'	Report	Jurečka 63'	Stadium: Puskás Aréna; Attendance: 54,444; Referee: Igor Pajać (Croatia)

12 October 2023 Euro 2024 qualifying	Albania	3–0	Czech Republic	Tirana, Albania
20:45 UTC+2	Asani 9'; Seferi 51', 73'	Report		Stadium: Arena Kombëtare; Attendance: 20,917; Referee: Danny Makkelie (Netherlands)

15 October 2023 Euro 2024 qualifying	Czech Republic	1–0	Faroe Islands	Plzeň, Czech Republic
18:00 UTC+2	Souček 76' (pen.)	Report		Stadium: Doosan Arena; Attendance: 9,115; Referee: Rohit Saggi (Norway)

17 November 2023 Euro 2024 qualifying	Poland	1–1	Czech Republic	Warsaw, Poland
20:45 UTC+1	Piotrowski 38'	Report	Souček 49'	Stadium: Stadion Narodowy; Attendance: 56,310; Referee: Daniele Orsato (Italy)

20 November 2023 Euro 2024 qualifying	Czech Republic	3–0	Moldova	Olomouc, Czech Republic
20:45 UTC+1	Douděra 14'; Chorý 72'; Souček 90'	Report		Stadium: Andrův Stadion; Attendance: 11,653; Referee: Sandro Schärer (Switzerland)

=== 2024 ===
22 March 2024 Friendly	Norway	1–2	Czech Republic	Oslo, Norway
18:00 UTC+1	Bobb 20'	Report	Zima 36'; Barák 85'	Stadium: Ullevaal Stadion; Attendance: 11,891; Referee: Willy Delajod (France)

26 March 2024 Friendly	Czech Republic	2–1	Armenia	Prague, Czech Republic
20:00 UTC+1	Krejčí 45+1'; Chorý 77'	Report	Sevikyan 14'	Stadium: Stadion Letná; Attendance: 16,158; Referee: Julian Weinberger (Austria)

7 June 2024 Friendly	Czech Republic	7–1	Malta	Grödig, Austria
17:30 UTC+2	Barák 6' (pen.); Chytil 44', 57'; D. Jurásek 47'; Lingr 71'; M. Jurásek 85'; Černý 89'	Report	P. Mbong 59'	Stadium: Untersberg-Arena; Attendance: 250; Referee: Stefan Ebner (Austria)

10 June 2024 Friendly	Czech Republic	2–1	North Macedonia	Hradec Králové, Czech Republic
18:00 UTC+2	Schick 60' (pen.); Barák 90+8' (pen.)	Report	Alimi 65'	Stadium: Malšovická aréna Attendance: 8,864; Referee: Michal Očenáš (Slovakia)

18 June 2024 Euro 2024 Group F	Portugal	2–1	Czech Republic	Leipzig, Germany
21:00 UTC+2	Hranáč 69' (o.g.); Conceição 90+2'	Report	Provod 62'	Stadium: Red Bull Arena; Attendance: 38,421; Referee: Marco Guida (Italy)

22 June 2024 Euro 2024 Group F	Georgia	1–1	Czech Republic	Hamburg, Germany
15:00 UTC+2	Mikautadze 45+4' (pen.)	Report	Schick 59'	Stadium: Volksparkstadion; Attendance: 46,524; Referee: Daniel Siebert (Germany)

26 June 2024 Euro 2024 Group F	Czech Republic	1–2	Turkey	Hamburg, Germany
21:00 UTC+2	Souček 66'	Report	Çalhanoğlu 51'; Tosun 90+4'	Stadium: Volksparkstadion; Attendance: 47,683; Referee: István Kovács (Romania)

7 September 2024 2024–25 Nations League	Georgia	4–1	Czech Republic	Tbilisi, Georgia
20:00 UTC+4	Kvaratskhelia 33' (pen.); Chakvetadze 53'; Mikautadze 63'; Kochorashvili 66'	Report	Kalvach 80'	Stadium: Mikheil Meskhi Stadium; Attendance: 20,401; Referee: Orel Grinfeld (Israel)

10 September 2024 2024–25 Nations League	Czech Republic	3–2	Ukraine	Prague, Czech Republic
20:45 UTC+2	Šulc 21', 45+2'; Souček 80' (pen.)	Report	Vanat 37'; Sudakov 84'	Stadium: Fortuna Arena; Attendance: 18,722; Referee: John Beaton (Scotland)

11 October 2024 2024–25 Nations League	Czech Republic	2–0	Albania	Prague, Czech Republic
20:45 UTC+2	Chorý 3', 63'	Report		Stadium: Stadion Letná; Attendance: 17,823; Referee: Benoît Bastien (France)

14 October 2024 2024–25 Nations League	Ukraine	1–1	Czech Republic	Wrocław, Poland
20:45 UTC+2	Dovbyk 52' (pen.)	Report	Červ 18'	Stadium: Wrocław Stadium; Attendance: 14,734; Referee: Guillermo Cuadra Fernández (Spain)

16 November 2024 2024–25 Nations League	Albania	0–0	Czech Republic	Tirana, Albania
20:45 UTC+1		Report		Stadium: Arena Kombëtare; Attendance: 20,800; Referee: Sandro Schärer (Switzerland)

19 November 2024 2024–25 Nations League	Czech Republic	2–1	Georgia	Olomouc, Czech Republic
20:45 UTC+1	Šulc 3'; Hložek 24'	Report	Mikautadze 60'	Stadium: Andrův stadion Attendance: 12,221; Referee: Anastasios Papapetrou (Greece)

=== 2025 ===
22 March 2025 2026 World Cup qualification	Czech Republic	2–1	Faroe Islands	Hradec Králové, Czech Republic
20:45 UTC+1	Schick 25', 85'	Report	Vatnhamar 83'	Stadium: Malšovická aréna Attendance: 8,978; Referee: Rade Obrenovič (Slovenia)

25 March 2025 2026 World Cup qualification	Gibraltar	0–4	Czech Republic	Faro/Loulé, Portugal
20:45 UTC+1		Report	Černý 21'; Schick 50'; Šulc 72'; Kliment 90+5'	Stadium: Estádio Algarve; Attendance: 583; Referee: Horațiu Feșnic (Romania)

6 June 2025 2026 World Cup qualification	Czech Republic	2–0	Montenegro	Plzeň, Czech Republic
20:45 UTC+2	Hložek 23'; Schick 65'	Report		Stadium: Doosan Arena; Attendance: 10,889; Referee: Serdar Gözübüyük (Netherlands)

9 June 2025 2026 World Cup qualification	Croatia	5–1	Czech Republic	Osijek, Croatia
20:45 UTC+2	Kramarić 42', 75'; Modrić 62' (pen.); Perišić 68'; Budimir 72' (pen.)	Report	Souček 58'	Stadium: Opus Arena; Attendance: 12,207; Referee: Jesús Gil Manzano (Spain)

5 September 2025 2026 World Cup qualification	Montenegro	0–2	Czech Republic	Podgorica, Montenegro
20:45 UTC+2		Report	Červ 3'; Černý 90+6'	Stadium: Podgorica City Stadium; Attendance: 6,315; Referee: Marco Guida (Italy)

8 September 2025 Friendly	Czech Republic	1–1	Saudi Arabia	Hradec Králové, Czech Republic
19:15 UTC+2	Chorý 21' (pen.)	Report	Al-Hamdan 90+1'	Stadium: Malšovická aréna Attendance: 8,300; Referee: Martin Dohál (Slovakia)

9 October 2025 2026 World Cup qualification	Czech Republic	0–0	Croatia	Prague, Czech Republic
20:45 UTC+2		Report		Stadium: Fortuna Arena; Attendance: 18,870; Referee: François Letexier (France)

12 October 2025 2026 World Cup qualification	Faroe Islands	2–1	Czech Republic	Tórshavn, Faroe Islands
17:00 UTC+1	Sørensen 67'; Agnarsson 81'	Report	Karabec 78'	Stadium: Tórsvøllur; Attendance: 2,980; Referee: Andrea Colombo (Italy)

13 November 2025 Friendly	Czech Republic	1–0	San Marino	Karviná, Czech Republic
18:00 UTC+1	Souček 40'	Report		Stadium: Městský stadion Attendance: 3,721; Referee: Paweł Raczkowski (Poland)

17 November 2025 2026 World Cup qualification	Czech Republic	6–0	Gibraltar	Olomouc, Czech Republic
20:45 UTC+1	Douděra 5'; Chorý 18'; Coufal 32'; Karabec 39'; Souček 44'; Hranáč 51'	Report		Stadium: Andrův stadion Attendance: 6,587; Referee: Sascha Stegemann (Germany)

=== 2026 ===
26 March 2026 2026 World Cup qualification play-offs	Czech Republic	2–2 (a.e.t.) (4–3 p)	Republic of Ireland	Prague, Czech Republic
20:45 UTC+1	Schick 27' (pen.); Krejčí 86'	Report	Parrott 19' (pen.); Kovář 23' (o.g.)	Stadium: Fortuna Arena; Attendance: 19,137; Referee: Glenn Nyberg (Sweden)
	Penalties
	Krejčí (penalty scored); Souček (penalty scored); Chytil (penalty missed); Schick (penalty scored); Kliment (penalty scored)		(penalty scored) Parrott; (penalty scored) Idah; (penalty scored) Brady; (penalty missed) Azaz; (penalty missed) Browne

31 March 2026 2026 World Cup qualification play-offs	Czech Republic	2–2 (a.e.t.) (3–1 p)	Denmark	Prague, Czech Republic
20:45 UTC+2	Šulc 3'; Krejčí 100'	Report	Andersen 72'; Høgh 111'	Stadium: Stadion Letná; Attendance: 18,215; Referee: Maurizio Mariani (Italy)
	Penalties
	Chorý (penalty scored); Souček (penalty scored); Krejčí (penalty missed); Sadílek (penalty scored)		(penalty missed) Højlund; (penalty scored) Eriksen; (penalty missed) Dreyer; (penalty missed) Jensen

31 May 2026 Friendly	Czech Republic	2–1	Kosovo	Prague, Czech Republic
16:00 UTC+2	Ladra 12'; Hložek 32'	Report	Emërllahu 81'	Stadium: Stadion Letná; Attendance: 11,102; Referee: Michal Očenáš (Slovakia)

4 June 2026 Friendly	Czech Republic	3–1	Guatemala	Harrison, United States
20:00 UTC−4	Schick 11'; Chorý 72'; Višinský 79'	Report	Fajardo 40'	Stadium: Sports Illustrated Stadium; Attendance: 9,810; Referee: Pierre-Luc Lauzière (Canada)

11 June 2026 2026 World Cup Group A	South Korea	2–1	Czech Republic	Zapopan, Mexico
20:00 UTC−6	Hwang In-beom 67'; Oh Hyeon-gyu 80'	Report	Krejčí 59'	Stadium: Estadio Akron; Attendance: 44,985; Referee: Amin Omar (Egypt)

18 June 2026 2026 World Cup Group A	Czech Republic	1–1	South Africa	Atlanta, United States
12:00 UTC−4	Sadílek 6'	Report	Mokoena 83' (pen.)	Stadium: Mercedes-Benz Stadium; Attendance: 67,442; Referee: Tori Penso (United States)

24 June 2026 2026 World Cup Group A	Czech Republic	0–3	Mexico	Mexico City, Mexico
19:00 UTC−6		Report	M. Chávez 55'; Quiñones 61'; Fidalgo 90+4'	Stadium: Estadio Azteca; Attendance: 80,824; Referee: Yael Falcón (Argentina)

26 September 2026 2026–27 Nations League	Czech Republic	1–2	Croatia	Prague, Czech Republic
20:45 UTC+2	Karabec 54'	Report	Modrić 47'; Pašalić 77'	Stadium: Fortuna Arena; Attendance: 15,421; Referee: Simone Sozza (Italy)

29 September 2026 2026–27 Nations League	Czech Republic	0–2	England	Prague, Czech Republic
20:45 UTC+2		Report	Gordon 47'; Kane 69'	Stadium: Fortuna Arena; Attendance: 18,930; Referee: Halil Umut Meler (Turkey)

3 October 2026 2026–27 Nations League	Spain	3–1	Czech Republic	Oviedo, Spain
20:45 UTC+2	Yamal 6'; Rodri 35'; Merino 89'	Report	Sláma 69'	Stadium: Estadio Carlos Tartiere; Attendance: 28,515; Referee: Vassilis Fotias (Greece)

6 October 2026 2026–27 Nations League	England	3–0	Czech Republic	London, England
19:45 UTC+1	Coufal 27' (o.g.); Kane 40', 57'	Report		Stadium: Wembley Stadium; Attendance: 78,864; Referee: Serdar Gözübüyük (Netherlands)

12 November 2026 2026–27 Nations League	Czech Republic	0–2	Spain	Prague, Czech Republic
20:45 UTC+1		Report	Baena 39' (pen.); Pubill 90+6'	Stadium: Fortuna Arena; Attendance: 18,193; Referee: Nikola Dabanović (Montenegro)

15 November 2026 2026–27 Nations League	Croatia	2–1	Czech Republic	Osijek, Croatia
20:45 UTC+1	Perišić 2'; Majer 87'	Report	Hložek 87'	Stadium: Opus Arena; Attendance: 12,009; Referee: Luís Godinho (Portugal)

== Head to head record ==
As of 15 November 2026 after the match against Croatia.

Head to head records
Opponent	P	W	D	L	GF	GA	W%	D%	L%
Albania	5	2	2	1	6	5	40	40	20
Armenia	1	1	0	0	2	1	100	0	0
Belarus	2	2	0	0	3	0	100	0	0
Belgium	2	0	1	1	1	4	0	50	50
Croatia	5	0	2	3	4	10	0	40	60
Cyprus	1	1	0	0	2	1	100	0	0
Denmark	2	0	1	1	3	4	0	50	50
England	3	0	0	3	0	6	0	0	100
Estonia	2	2	0	0	8	2	100	0	0
Faroe Islands	5	4	0	1	12	3	80	0	20
Georgia	3	1	1	1	6	4	33.33	33.33	33.33
Germany	1	0	0	1	0	1	0	0	100
Gibraltar	2	2	0	0	10	0	100	0	0
Guatemala	1	1	0	0	3	1	100	0	0
Hungary	1	0	1	0	1	1	0	100	0
Israel	2	2	0	0	3	1	100	0	0
Italy	1	0	0	1	0	4	0	0	100
Kosovo	1	1	0	0	2	1	100	0	0
Kuwait	1	1	0	0	7	0	100	0	0
Malta	1	1	0	0	7	1	100	0	0
Mexico	1	0	0	1	0	3	0	0	100
Moldova	2	1	1	0	3	0	50	50	0
Montenegro	3	3	0	0	8	1	100	0	0
Netherlands	1	1	0	0	2	0	100	0	0
North Macedonia	1	1	0	0	2	1	100	0	0
Norway	1	1	0	0	2	1	100	0	0
Poland	2	1	1	0	4	2	50	50	0
Portugal	3	0	0	3	1	8	0	0	100
Republic of Ireland	1	0	1	0	2	2	0	100	0
San Marino	1	1	0	0	1	0	100	0	0
Saudi Arabia	1	0	1	0	1	1	0	100	0
Scotland	3	1	0	2	3	3	33.33	0	66.67
Slovakia	2	2	0	0	5	1	100	0	0
South Africa	1	0	1	0	1	1	0	100	0
South Korea	1	0	0	1	1	2	0	0	100
Spain	4	0	1	3	3	9	0	25	75
Sweden	1	0	0	1	0	1	0	0	100
Switzerland	2	1	0	1	3	3	50	0	50
Turkey	2	0	0	2	2	4	0	0	100
Ukraine	3	1	2	0	5	4	33.33	66.67	0
Wales	3	0	2	1	3	4	0	66.67	33.33
Total	81	35	18	28	131	101	43.21	22.22	34.57
