= Czech Republic national football team results (1994–2019) =

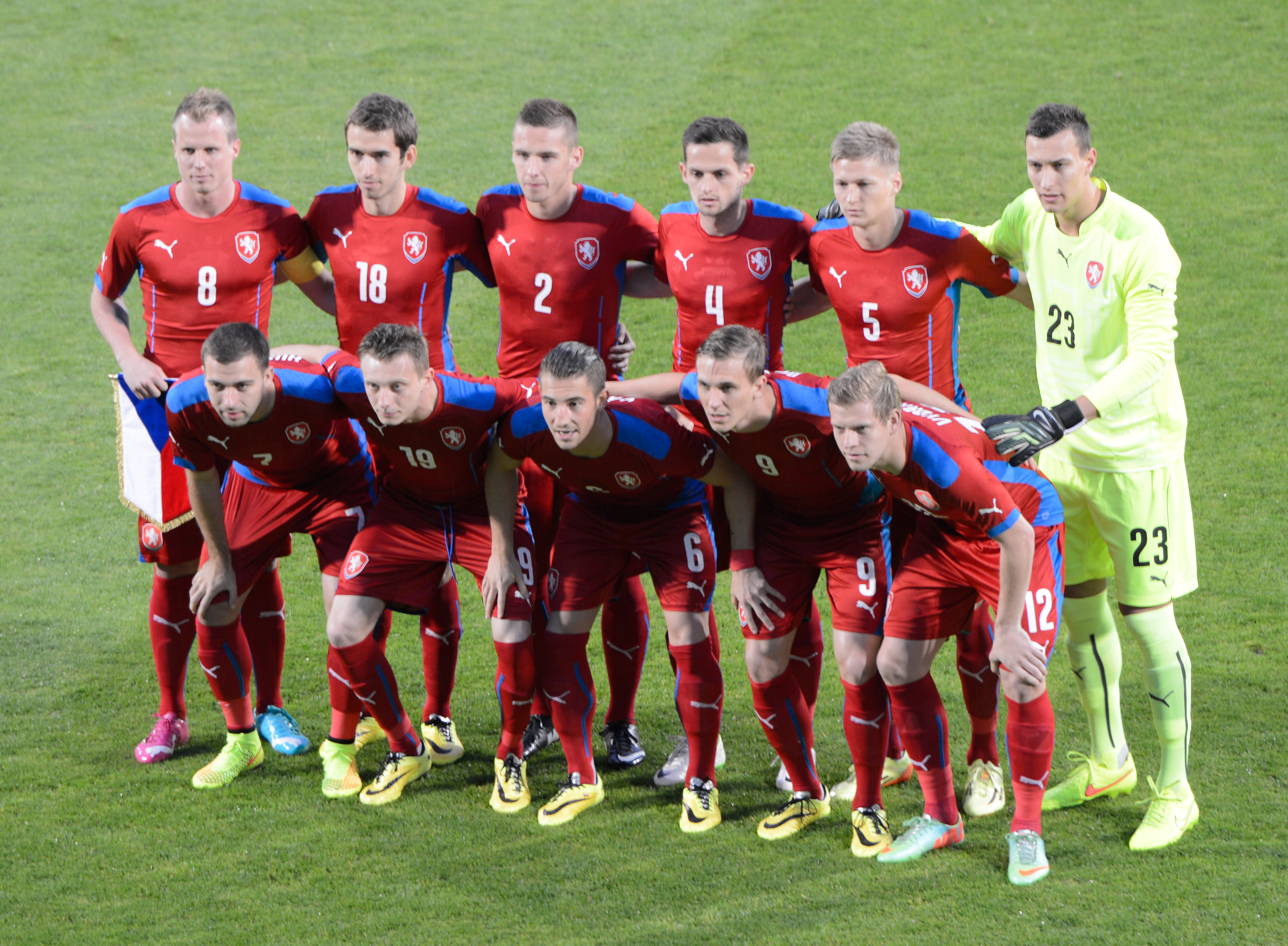
Team before friendly match against Austria, June 2014

This is a list of the Czech Republic national football team results from 1994 to 2019.

== Before 2000 ==
Date	Venue	Opponents	Score^{1}	Competition	Czech Republic scorers	Attendance	Reference
23 February 1994	İnönü Stadium, Istanbul (A)	Turkey	4–1	F	Novotný, Látal, Siegl (2)	12,000	
20 April 1994	Hardturm Stadium, Zürich (A)	Switzerland	0–3	F		16,200	
25 May 1994	Bazaly Stadium, Ostrava (H)	Lithuania	5–3	F	Kuka (2), Frýdek, Kubík, Poštulka	8,407	
5 June 1994	Lansdowne Road, Dublin (A)	Republic of Ireland	3–1	F	Kuka (2), Suchopárek	43,465	
17 August 1994	Parc Lescure, Bordeaux (A)	France	2–2	F	Skuhravý, Šmejkal	21,000	
6 September 1994	Bazaly Stadium, Ostrava (H)	Malta	6–1	UEFAq	Šmejkal, Kubík, Siegl (3), Berger	10,226	
12 October 1994	Ta' Qali Stadium, Ta' Qali (A)	Malta	0–0	UEFAq		2,000	
16 November 1994	Feyenoord Stadion, Rotterdam (A)	Netherlands	0–0	UEFAq		42,000	
8 March 1995	Stadion Za Lužánkami, Brno (H)	Finland	4–1	F	Berger (2), Samec (2)	7,745	
29 March 1995	Bazaly Stadium, Ostrava (H)	Belarus	4–2	UEFAq	Kadlec, Berger(2), Kuka	5,549	
26 April 1995	Letná Stadium, Prague (H)	Netherlands	3–1	UEFAq	Skuhravý, Němeček, Berger	17,463	
8 May 1995	Tehelné pole, Bratislava (A)	Slovakia	1–1	F	Šmejkal	10,000	
7 June 1995	Stade Josy Barthel, Luxembourg (A)	Luxembourg	0–1	UEFAq		1,030	
16 August 1995	Ullevaal Stadium, Oslo (A)	Norway	1–1	UEFAq	Suchopárek	22,054	
6 September 1995	Letná Stadium, Prague (H)	Norway	2–0	UEFAq	Skuhravý, Drulák	19,522	
7 October 1995	Dinamo Stadium, Minsk (A)	Belarus	2–0	UEFAq	Frýdek, Berger	15,000	
15 November 1995	Letná Stadium, Prague (H)	Luxembourg	3–0	UEFAq	Drulak (2), Berger	20,239	
13 December 1995	Municipal Stadium, Kuwait (A)	Kuwait	2–1	F	Gabriel, Drulak	2,000	
26 March 1996	Vitkovice Stadium, Ostrava (H)	Turkey	3–0	F	Suchopárek, Kuka (2)	10,828	
24 April 1996	Stadion Evžena Rošického, Prague (H)	Republic of Ireland	2–0	F	Frýdek, Kuka	6,118	
29 May 1996	Stadion Lehen, Salzburg (A)	Austria	0–1	F		5,100	
1 June 1996	St. Jakob Stadium, Basel (A)	Switzerland	2–1	F	Kuka	14,400	
9 June 1996	Old Trafford, Manchester (N)	Germany	0–2	UEFA		35,000	
14 June 1996	Anfield, Liverpool (N)	Italy	2–1	UEFA	Nedvěd, Bejbl	37,320	
19 June 1996	Anfield, Liverpool (N)	Russia	3–3	UEFA	Suchopárek, Kuka, Šmicer	10,000	
23 June 1996	Villa Park, Birmingham (N)	Portugal	1–0	UEFA (QF)	Poborský	25,000	
26 June 1996	Old Trafford, Manchester (N)	France	0–0; 6–5(p)	UEFA (SF)		43,877	
30 June 1996	Wembley Stadium, London (N)	Germany	1–2 (ASDET)	UEFA (F)	Berger (p)	73,611	
4 September 1996	Stadion Střelnice, Jablonec (H)	Iceland	2–1	F	Kuka (2)	4,528	
18 September 1996	Na Stínadlech, Teplice (H)	Malta	6–0	WCq	Berger (2), Nedvěd, Kubík, Šmicer, Frýdek	15,099	
9 October 1996	Letná Stadium, Prague (H)	Spain	0–0	WCq		19,223	
10 November 1996	Crvena Zvezda Stadium, Belgrade (A)	FR Yugoslavia	0–1	WCq		46,577	
11 December 1996	Stade Mohamed V, Casablanca (N)	Nigeria	2–1	F (SF)	Drulák, Wagner	70,000	
12 December 1996	Stade Mohamed V, Casablanca (N)	Croatia	1–1; 1–4(p)	F (F)	Drulák	34,000	
26 February 1997	Zimní stadion, Poděbrady (H)	Belarus	4–1	F	Wagner, Rada (2), Berger	7,500	
12 March 1997	Bazaly Stadium, Ostrava (H)	Poland	2–1	F	Kuka, Rada	15,817	
2 April 1997	Letná Stadium, Prague (H)	FR Yugoslavia	1–2	WCq	Bejbl	19,137	
8 June 1997	Estadio José Zorrilla, Valladolid (A)	Spain	0–1	WCq		24,544	
20 August 1997	Na Stínadlech, Teplice (H)	Faroe Islands	2–0	WCq	Kuka, Kozel	8,322	
24 August 1997	Tehelné pole, Bratislava (A)	Slovakia	1–2	WCq	Šmicer	26,000	
6 September 1997	Svangaskard, Toftir (A)	Faroe Islands	2–0	WCq	Šmicer, Kuka	1,000	
24 September 1997	Ta' Qali Stadium, Ta' Qali (A)	Malta	1–0	WCq	Bejbl	3,000	
11 October 1997	Letná Stadium, Prague (H)	Slovakia	3–0	WCq	Šmicer, Siegl, Novotný	5,428	
13 December 1997	King Fahd Stadium, Riyadh (N)	South Africa	2–2	CC	Šmicer (2)	7,500	
15 December 1997	King Fahd Stadium, Riyadh (N)	Uruguay	1–2	CC	Siegl	9,000	
17 December 1997	King Fahd Stadium, Riyadh (N)	United Arab Emirates	6–1	CC	o.g., Nedvěd (2), Šmicer (3)	8,000	
19 December 1997	King Fahd Stadium, Riyadh (N)	Brazil	0–2	CC (SF)		30,000	
21 December 1997	King Fahd Stadium, Riyadh (N)	Uruguay	1–0	CC (3/4)	Lasota	27,000	
25 March 1998	Andrův stadion, Olomouc (H)	Republic of Ireland	2–1	F	Šmicer, Lasota	9,405	
22 April 1998	Fazanerija Stadion, Murska Sobota (A)	Slovenia	3–1	F	Šmicer, Lukes (2)	2,500	
21 May 1998	Kobe Universiade Memorial Stadium, Kobe (N)	Paraguay	1–0	F	Šmicer	6,000	
23 May 1998	Yokohama Stadium, Yokohama (N)	Japan	0–0	F		66,930	
27 May 1998	Olympic Stadium, Seoul (A)	South Korea	2–2	F	Němec, Lokvenc	43,000	
19 August 1998	Letná Stadium, Prague (H)	Denmark	1–0	F	Rada	7,021	
6 September 1998	Svangaskard, Toftir (A)	Faroe Islands	1–0	UEFAq	Šmicer	3,000	
10 October 1998	Asim Ferhatović Hase Stadium, Sarajevo (A)	Bosnia and Herzegovina	3–1	UEFAq	Baranek, Šmicer, Kuka	30,000	
14 October 1998	Na Stínadlech, Teplice (H)	Estonia	4–1	UEFAq	Nedvěd, Berger (2)	13,123	
18 November 1998	Wembley Stadium, London (A)	England	0–2	F		38,535	
9 February 1999	King Baudouin Stadium, Brussels (A)	Belgium	1–0	F	Koller	14,700	
17 February 1999	Beirut (A)	Lebanon	3–0	F			
27 March 1999	Na Stínadlech, Teplice (H)	Lithuania	2–0	UEFAq	Horňák, Berger	14,658	
31 March 1999	Celtic Park, Glasgow (A)	Scotland	2–1	UEFAq	Elliott (o.g.), Šmicer	44,513	
28 April 1999	Polish Army Stadium, Warsaw (A)	Poland	1–2	F	Lokvenc	8,000	
5 June 1999	Kadrioru Stadium, Tallinn (A)	Estonia	2–0	UEFAq	Berger, Koller	2,925	
9 June 1999	Letná Stadium, Prague (H)	Scotland	3–2	UEFAq	Řepka, Kuka, Koller	21,149	
18 August 1999	Sportovní areál, Drnovice (H)	Switzerland	3–0	F	Koller, Zwyssig (o.g.), Baranek	7,825	
4 September 1999	Zalgiris Stadium, Vilnius (A)	Lithuania	4–0	UEFAq	Nedvěd (2), Koller (2)	4,000	
8 September 1999	Na Stínadlech, Teplice (H)	Bosnia and Herzegovina	3–0	UEFAq	Koller, Berger, Poborský	10,125	
9 October 1999	Letná Stadium, Prague (H)	Faroe Islands	2–0	UEFAq	Koller, Verbíř	21,362	
13 November 1999	Philips Stadion, Eindhoven (A)	Netherlands	1–1	F	Koller	30,000	

1. Czech Republic's score given first

Key

- H = Home match
- A = Away match
- N = Neutral site match
- F = Friendly
- UEFAq = UEFA European Championships qualification
- UEFA = UEFA European Championships
- WCq = FIFA World Cup qualification (UEFA)
- WC = FIFA World Cup
- CC = Confederations Cup

== 2000 ==
8 February Carlsberg Cup	Czech Republic	2–1	Mexico	Hong Kong
Match 578/70	Kolomazník 50'; Verbíř 55'	ČMFS Report	Zepeda 80' (pen.)	Stadium: Hong Kong Stadium; Attendance: 36,000; Referee: Nielsen (Denmark)

23 February International Friendly	Republic of Ireland	3–2	Czech Republic	Dublin, Ireland
Match 579/71	Rada 16' (o.g.); Harte 44'; Robbie Keane 87'	ČMFS Report	Koller 4', 35'	Stadium: Lansdowne Road; Attendance: 35,043; Referee: Coue (France)

29 March International Friendly	Czech Republic	3–1	Australia	Teplice, Czech Republic
Match 580/72	Fukal 9'; Koller 53'; Ulich 67'	ČMFS Report	Foster 89'	Stadium: Na Stínadlech; Attendance: 9,820; Referee: Hrivnák (Slovakia)

26 April International Friendly	Czech Republic	4–1	Israel	Prague, Czech Republic
Match 581/73	Nedvěd 14', 57'; Koller 37'; Wagner 90'	ČMFS Report	Berkovic 81'	Stadium: Letná; Attendance: 4,972; Referee: Zbigniew (Poland)

3 June International Friendly	Germany	3–2	Czech Republic	Nuremberg, Germany
Match 582/74	Jancker 38'; Bierhoff 63' (pen.), 90'	ČMFS Report	Kuka 58'; Berger 79'	Stadium: Frankenstadion; Attendance: 30,000; Referee: Trentalange (Italy)

11 June UEFA Euro 2000; Group D	Netherlands	1–0	Czech Republic	Amsterdam, Netherlands
20:45 EST (UTC+02); Match 583/75	F. de Boer 89' (pen.)	UEFA Report		Stadium: Amsterdam Arena; Attendance: 50,000; Referee: Collina (Italy)

16 June UEFA Euro 2000; Group D	Czech Republic	1–2	France	Bruges, Belgium
18:00 EST (UTC+02); Match 584/76	Poborský 35' (pen.)	UEFA Report	Henry 7'; Djorkaeff 60'	Stadium: Jan Breydel Stadium; Attendance: 30,000; Referee: Poll (England)

21 June UEFA Euro 2000; Group D	Denmark	0–2	Czech Republic	Liège, Belgium
20:45 EST (UTC+02); Match 585/77		UEFA Report	Šmicer 64', 67'	Stadium: Stade Maurice Dufrasne; Attendance: 24,000; Referee: Al-Ghandour (Egypt)

16 August International Friendly	Czech Republic	0–1	Slovenia	Ostrava, Czech Republic
Match 586/78		ČMFS Report	Pavlin 59'	Stadium: Bazaly; Attendance: 4,828; Referee: Hanacsek (Hungary)

2 September 2002 FIFA World Cup; Qualification Group 3	Bulgaria	0–1	Czech Republic	Sofia, Bulgaria
19:00 EEST (UTC+03); Match 587/79		FIFA Report	Poborský 73'	Stadium: Georgi Asparuhov Stadium; Attendance: 8,000; Referee: Juan Fernández (Spain)

7 October 2002 FIFA World Cup; Qualification Group 3	Czech Republic	4–0	Iceland	Teplice, Czech Republic
19:00 CEST (UTC+02); Match 588/80	Koller 17', 40'; Nedvěd 44', 90'	FIFA Report		Stadium: Na Stínadlech; Attendance: 9,843; Referee: Vassaras (Greece)

11 October 2002 FIFA World Cup; Qualification Group 3	Malta	0–0	Czech Republic	Ta' Qali, Malta
18:00 CEST (UTC+02); Match 589/81		FIFA Report		Stadium: Ta' Qali National Stadium; Attendance: 582; Referee: Širić (Croatia)

== 2001 ==
28 February International Friendly	Macedonia	1–1	Czech Republic	Skopje, Macedonia
Match 590/82	Hristov 34'	ČMFS Report	Kuka 42'	Attendance: 8,200; Referee: Dobrimov (Bulgaria)

24 March 2002 FIFA World Cup; Qualification Group 3	Northern Ireland	0–1	Czech Republic	Belfast, Northern Ireland
15:00 GMT (UTC±0); Match 591/83		FIFA Report	Nedvěd 11'	Stadium: Windsor Park; Attendance: 10,368; Referee: Mejuto González (Spain)

28 March 2002 FIFA World Cup; Qualification Group 3	Czech Republic	0–0	Denmark	Prague, Czech Republic
20:30 CEST (UTC+02); Match 592/84		FIFA Report		Stadium: Letná; Attendance: 16,354; Referee: Barber (England)

25 April International Friendly	Czech Republic	1–1	Belgium	Prague, Czech Republic
Match 593/85	Baroš 82'	ČMFS Report	Mpenza 11'	Stadium: Letná; Attendance: 4,887; Referee: Čeferin (Slovenia)

2 June 2002 FIFA World Cup; Qualification Group 3	Denmark	2–1	Czech Republic	Copenhagen, Denmark
19:15 CEST (UTC+02); Match 594/86	Sand 6'; Tomasson 84'	FIFA Report	Týce 41'	Stadium: Parken Stadium; Attendance: 41,669; Referee: Merk (Germany)

6 June 2002 FIFA World Cup; Qualification Group 3	Czech Republic	3–1	Northern Ireland	Teplice, Czech Republic
17:00 CEST (UTC+02); Match 595/87	Kuka 40', 87'; Baroš 90'	FIFA Report	Mulryne 45'	Stadium: Na Stínadlech; Attendance: 14,050; Referee: Sundell (Sweden)

15 August International Friendly	Czech Republic	5–0	South Korea	Drnovice, Czech Republic
Match 596/88	Nedvěd 30'; Baranek 66', 86', 90' (pen.); Lokvenc 74'	ČMFS Report		Stadium: Sportovní areál Attendance: 6,596; Referee: Gádoši (Slovakia)

1 September 2002 FIFA World Cup; Qualification Group 3	Iceland	3–1	Czech Republic	Reykjavik, Iceland
14:00 WET (UTC±0); Match 597/89	Sverrisson 45', 77'; Sigthorsson 66'	FIFA Report	Jankulovski 88'	Stadium: Laugardalsvöllur; Attendance: 6,011; Referee: Messina (Italy)

5 September 2002 FIFA World Cup; Qualification Group 3	Czech Republic	3–2	Malta	Teplice, Czech Republic
17:00 CEST (UTC+02); Match 598/90	Jankulovski 20'; Lokvenc 37'; Baroš 68'	FIFA Report	Carabott 22' (pen.); Agius 55'	Stadium: Na Stínadlech; Attendance: 9,280; Referee: Mammedov (Azerbaijan)

6 October 2002 FIFA World Cup; Qualification Group 3	Czech Republic	6–0	Bulgaria	Prague, Czech Republic
20:15 CEST (UTC+02); Match 599/91	Rosický 5', 69'; Nedvěd 16', 76'; Baroš 27'; Lokvenc 66'	FIFA Report		Stadium: Letná; Attendance: 15,020; Referee: Colombo (France)

10 November 2002 FIFA World Cup; Qualification Playoff	Belgium	1–0	Czech Republic	Brussels, Belgium
20:15 CET (UTC+01); Match 600/92	Verheyen 28'	FIFA Report		Stadium: King Baudouin Stadium; Attendance: 39,000; Referee: Meier (Switzerland)

14 November 2002 FIFA World Cup; Qualification Playoff	Czech Republic	0–1 (0–2 agg.)	Belgium	Prague, Czech Republic
20:15 CET (UTC+01); Match 601/93		FIFA Report	Wilmots 85' (pen.)	Stadium: Letná; Attendance: 18,996; Referee: Frisk (Sweden)

== 2002 ==
12 February International Friendly	Czech Republic	2–0	Hungary	Larnaca, Cyprus
Match 602/94	Koloušek 7'; Koller 65'	ČMFS Report		Stadium: Neo GSZ Stadium; Attendance: 200; Referee: Kailis (Cyprus)

13 February International Friendly	Cyprus	3–4	Czech Republic	Nicosia, Cyprus
Match 603/95	Christodoulou 26'; Joakim 68'; Konstantinou 88'	ČMFS Report	Lokvenc 51'; Koller 74', 86'; Šmicer 90'	Stadium: GSP Stadium; Attendance: 450; Referee: Kailis (Cyprus)

27 March International Friendly	Wales	0–0	Czech Republic	Cardiff, Wales
Match 604/96		ČMFS Report		Stadium: Millennium Stadium; Attendance: 20,000; Referee: Larsen (Denmark)

17 April International Friendly	Greece	0–0	Czech Republic	Ioannina, Greece
Match 605/97		ČMFS Report		Stadium: Zosimades Stadium; Attendance: 10,000; Referee: Bertolini (Switzerland)

18 May International Friendly	Czech Republic	1–0	Italy	Prague, Czech Republic
Match 606/98	Šmicer 25'	ČMFS Report		Stadium: Letná; Attendance: 15,077; Referee: Fröhlich (Germany)

21 August International Friendly	Czech Republic	4–1	Slovakia	Olomouc, Czech Republic
Match 607/99	Koller 31', 64'; Rosický 70', 78'	ČMFS Report	Németh 8'	Stadium: Andrův stadion Attendance: 11,986; Referee: Duros (Greece)

6 September International Friendly	Czech Republic	5–0	FR Yugoslavia	Prague, Czech Republic
Match 608/100	Šmicer 2'; Ujfaluši 21', 55'; Baroš 51', 80'	ČMFS Report		Stadium: Letná; Attendance: 5,435; Referee: Baskakov (Russia)

12 October UEFA Euro 2004; Qualifying Group 3	Moldova	0–2	Czech Republic	Chişinău, Moldova
16:30 EEST (UTC+03); Match 609/101		UEFA Report	Jankulovski 69' (pen.); Rosický 79'	Stadium: Stadionul Republican; Attendance: 3,500; Referee: Irvine (Northern Ireland)

16 October UEFA Euro 2004; Qualifying Group 3	Czech Republic	2–0	Belarus	Teplice, Czech Republic
16:30 CEST (UTC+02); Match 610/102	Poborský 6'; Baroš 23'	UEFA Report		Stadium: Na Stínadlech; Attendance: 12,850; Referee: Fleischer (Germany)

20 November International Friendly	Czech Republic	3–3	Sweden	Teplice, Czech Republic
Match 611/103	Fukal 8'; Vachoušek 45'; Baroš 63'	ČMFS Report	Nilsson 29', 43'; Allbäck 65'	Stadium: Na Stínadlech; Attendance: 10,238; Referee: Bosat (Turkey)

== 2003 ==
12 February International Friendly	France	0–2	Czech Republic	Paris, France
Match 612/104		ČMFS Report	Grygera 7'; Baroš 61'	Stadium: Stade de France; Attendance: 65,000; Referee: Stark (Germany)

29 March UEFA Euro 2004; Qualifying Group 3	Netherlands	1–1	Czech Republic	Rotterdam, Netherlands
20:30 CET (UTC+01); Match 613/105	van Nistelrooy 45+1'	UEFA Report	Koller 68'	Stadium: De Kuip; Attendance: 51,177; Referee: Nielsen (Denmark)

2 April UEFA Euro 2004; Qualifying Group 3	Czech Republic	4–0	Austria	Prague, Czech Republic
20:30 CEST (UTC+02); Match 614/106	Nedvěd 18'; Koller 32', 62'; Jankulovski 56' (pen.)	UEFA Report		Stadium: Letná; Attendance: 17,150; Referee: López Nieto (Spain)

30 April International Friendly	Czech Republic	4–0	Turkey	Teplice, Czech Republic
Match 615/107	Rosický 2'; Koller 21'; Šmicer 27'; Baroš 38'	ČMFS Report		Stadium: Na Stínadlech; Attendance: 14,156; Referee: Szabó (Hungary)

11 June UEFA Euro 2004; Qualifying Group 3	Czech Republic	5–0	Moldova	Olomouc, Czech Republic
20:15 CEST (UTC+02); Match 616/108	Šmicer 41'; Koller 73' (pen.); Štajner 82'; Lokvenc 88', 90'	UEFA Report		Stadium: Andrův stadion Attendance: 12,097; Referee: Jakobsson (ISL)

6 September UEFA Euro 2004; Qualifying Group 3	Belarus	1–3	Czech Republic	Minsk, Belarus
18:30 EEST (UTC+03); Match 617/109	Bulyha 14'	UEFA Report	Nedvěd 37'; Baroš 54'; Šmicer 85'	Stadium: Dinamo Stadium; Attendance: 8,500; Referee: McCurry (Scotland)

10 September UEFA Euro 2004; Qualifying Group 3	Czech Republic	3–1	Netherlands	Prague, Czech Republic
20:15 CEST (UTC+02); Match 618/110	Koller 14' (pen.); Poborský 37'; Baroš 90+3'	UEFA Report	van der Vaart 60'	Stadium: Letná; Attendance: 18,356; Referee: Batista (Portugal)

11 October UEFA Euro 2004; Qualifying Group 3	Austria	2–3	Czech Republic	Vienna, Austria
17:00 CEST (UTC+02); Match 619/111	Haas 49'; Ivanschitz 77'	UEFA Report	Jankulovski 26'; Vachoušek 78'; Koller 90'	Stadium: Ernst Happel Stadium; Attendance: 32,350; Referee: Kasnaferis (Greece)

12 November International Friendly	Czech Republic	5–1	Canada	Teplice, Czech Republic
Match 620/112	Jankulovski 27' (pen.); Heinz 49'; Poborský 56'; Sionko 63'; Skácel 81'	ČMFS Report	Radzinski 89'	Stadium: Na Stínadlech; Attendance: 8,343; Referee: Sundell (Sweden)

== 2004 ==
18 February International Friendly	Italy	2–2	Czech Republic	Palermo, Italy
Match 621/113	Vieri 14'; Di Natale 86'	ČMFS Report	Štajner 42'; Rosický 88'	Stadium: Stadio Renzo Barbera; Attendance: 20,935; Referee: Braamhaar (Netherlands)

31 March International Friendly	Republic of Ireland	2–1	Czech Republic	Dublin, Ireland
Match 622/114	Harte 52'; Keane 90'	ČMFS Report	Baroš 81'	Stadium: Lansdowne Road; Attendance: 42,000; Referee: Fisker (Denmark)

28 April International Friendly	Czech Republic	0–1	Japan	Prague, Czech Republic
Match 623/115		ČMFS Report	Kubo 33'	Stadium: Letná; Attendance: 11,802; Referee: McKeon (Ireland)

2 June International Friendly	Czech Republic	3–1	Bulgaria	Prague, Czech Republic
Match 624/116	Baroš 54'; Plašil 74'; Rosický 81'	ČMFS Report	Petkov 90'	Stadium: Letná; Attendance: 6,627; Referee: Stredak (Slovakia)

6 June International Friendly	Czech Republic	2–0	Estonia	Teplice, Czech Republic
Match 625/117	Baroš 6', 22'	ČMFS Report		Stadium: Na Stínadlech; Attendance: 11,873; Referee: Brugger (Austria)

15 June UEFA Euro 2004; Group D	Czech Republic	2–1	Latvia	Aveiro, Portugal
17:00 WEST (UTC+01); Match 626/118	Baroš 73'; Heinz 85'	UEFA Report	Verpakovskis 45+1'	Stadium: Estádio Municipal de Aveiro; Attendance: 21,744; Referee: Veissière (France)

19 June UEFA Euro 2004; Group D	Netherlands	2–3	Czech Republic	Aveiro, Portugal
19:45 WEST (UTC+01); Match 627/119	Bouma 4' van Nistelrooy 19'	UEFA Report	Koller 23'; Baroš 71'; Šmicer 88'	Stadium: Estádio Municipal de Aveiro; Attendance: 29,935; Referee: Mejuto González (Spain)

23 June UEFA Euro 2004; Group D	Germany	1–2	Czech Republic	Lisbon, Portugal
19:45 WEST (UTC+01); Match 628/120	Ballack 21'	UEFA Report	Heinz 30'; Baroš 77'	Stadium: Estádio José Alvalade; Attendance: 46,849; Referee: Hauge (Norway)

27 June UEFA Euro 2004; Quarter final	Czech Republic	3–0	Denmark	Lisbon, Portugal
19:45 WEST (UTC+01); Match 629/121	Koller 49'; Baroš 63', 65'	UEFA Report		Stadium: Estádio do Dragão; Attendance: 42,000; Referee: Ivanov (Russia)

1 July UEFA Euro 2004; Semi final	Greece	1–0 (a.e.t.)	Czech Republic	Lisbon, Portugal
19:45 WEST (UTC+01); Match 630/122	Dellas 105+1' (s.g.)	UEFA Report		Stadium: Estádio do Dragão; Attendance: 42,449; Referee: Collina (Italy)

18 August International Friendly	Czech Republic	0–0	Greece	Prague, Czech Republic
Match 631/123		ČMFS Report		Stadium: Stadion Evžena Rošického; Attendance: 15,050; Referee: Dougal (Scotland)

8 September 2006 FIFA World Cup; Qualification Group 1	Netherlands	2–0	Czech Republic	Amsterdam, Netherlands
20:30 CEST (UTC+02); Match 632/124	van Hooijdonk 34', 84'	FIFA Report		Stadium: Amsterdam ArenA; Attendance: 48,488; Referee: Merk (Germany)

9 October 2006 FIFA World Cup; Qualification Group 1	Czech Republic	1–0	Romania	Prague, Czech Republic
17:00 CEST (UTC+02); Match 633/125	Koller 36'	FIFA Report		Stadium: Letná; Attendance: 16,028; Referee: Rosetti (Italy)

13 October 2006 FIFA World Cup; Qualification Group 1	Armenia	0–3	Czech Republic	Yerevan, Armenia
20:20 AMST (UTC+05); Match 634/126		FIFA Report	Koller 3' 75'; Rosický 30'	Stadium: Republican Stadium; Attendance: 3,205; Referee: Granat (Poland)

17 November 2006 FIFA World Cup; Qualification Group 1	Macedonia	0–2	Czech Republic	Skopje, Macedonia
17:30 CET (UTC+01); Match 635/127		FIFA Report	Lokvenc 88'; Koller 90'	Stadium: Skopje City Stadium; Attendance: 7,000; Referee: Meier (Switzerland)

== 2005 ==
9 February International Friendly	Slovenia	0–3	Czech Republic	Celje, Slovenia
Match 636/128		ČMFS Report	Koller 10'; Jun 47'; Polák 79'	Stadium: Arena Petrol; Attendance: 4,000; Referee: Strahonja (Croatia)

26 March 2006 FIFA World Cup; Qualification Group 1	Czech Republic	4–3	Finland	Teplice, Czech Republic
17:00 CET (UTC+01); Match 637/129	Baroš 7'; Rosický 34'; Polák 58'; Lokvenc 87'	FIFA Report	Litmanen 46'; Riihilahti 73'; Johansson 79'	Stadium: Na Stínadlech; Attendance: 16,200; Referee: Larsen (Denmark)

30 March 2006 FIFA World Cup; Qualification Group 1	Andorra	0–4	Czech Republic	Andorra La Vella, Andorra
16:50 CEST (UTC+02); Match 638/130		FIFA Report	Jankulovski 31' (pen.); Baroš 40'; Lokvenc 53'; Rosický 92' (pen.)	Stadium: Estadi Comunal d'Aixovall; Attendance: 900; Referee: Messner (Austria)

4 June 2006 FIFA World Cup; Qualification Group 1	Czech Republic	8–1	Andorra	Liberec, Czech Republic
17:00 CEST (UTC+02); Match 639/131	Lokvenc 12', 92'; Koller 30'; Šmicer 37'; Galásek 52'; Baroš 79'; Rosický 84'; Polák 86'	FIFA Report	Riera 36'	Stadium: U Nisy; Attendance: 9,520; Referee: Dereli (Turkey)

8 June 2006 FIFA World Cup; Qualification Group 1	Czech Republic	6–1	Macedonia	Teplice, Czech Republic
17:00 CEST (UTC+02); Match 640/132	Koller 41', 45', 48', 52'; Rosický 73'; Baroš 87'	FIFA Report	Pandev 13'	Stadium: Na Stínadlech; Attendance: 14,150; Referee: Dauden Ibanez (Spain)

17 August International Friendly	Sweden	2–1	Czech Republic	Gothenburg, Sweden
Match 641/133	Larsson 19'; Rosenberg 25'	ČMFS Report	Koller 22' (pen.)	Stadium: Ullevi; Attendance: 23,117; Referee: Bennett (England)

3 September 2006 FIFA World Cup; Qualification Group 1	Romania	2–0	Czech Republic	Constanța, Romania
21:00 EEST (UTC+03); Match 642/134	Mutu 28', 56'	FIFA Report		Stadium: Stadionul Farul; Attendance: 7,000; Referee: Hauge (Norway)

7 September 2006 FIFA World Cup; Qualification Group 1	Czech Republic	4–1	Armenia	Olomouc, Czech Republic
17:30 CEST (UTC+02); Match 643/135	Heinz 47'; Polák 52', 76'; Baroš 58'	FIFA Report	Hakobyan 85'	Stadium: Andrův stadion Attendance: 12,015; Referee: Tateosian (Armenia)

8 October 2006 FIFA World Cup; Qualification Group 1	Czech Republic	0–2	Netherlands	Prague, Czech Republic
20:30 CEST (UTC+02); Match 644/136		FIFA Report	van der Vaart 31'; Opdam 38'	Stadium: Letná; Attendance: 17,478; Referee: Sars (France)

12 October 2006 FIFA World Cup; Qualification Group 1	Finland	0–3	Czech Republic	Helsinki, Finland
18:30 EEST (UTC+03); Match 645/137		FIFA Report	Jun 6'; Rosický 51'; Heinz 58'	Stadium: Helsinki Olympic Stadium; Attendance: 11,234; Referee: Mejuto González (Spain)

12 November 2006 FIFA World Cup; Qualification play-off	Norway	0–1	Czech Republic	Oslo, Norway
19:30 CET (UTC+01); Match 646/138		FIFA Report	Šmicer 31'	Stadium: Ullevaal Stadion; Attendance: 24,264; Referee: Busacca (Switzerland)

16 November 2006 FIFA World Cup; Qualification play-off	Czech Republic	1–0 (2–0 agg.)	Norway	Prague, Czech Republic
20:15 CET (UTC+01); Match 647/139	Rosický 35'	FIFA Report		Stadium: Letná; Attendance: 17,464; Referee: Poll (England)

== 2006 ==
1 March International Friendly	Turkey	2–2	Czech Republic	İzmir, Turkey
Match 648/140	Karan 89', 90'	ČMFS Report	Poborský 20' (pen.); Štajner 61'	Stadium: İzmir Atatürk Stadium; Attendance: 58,000; Referee: Meyer (Germany)

26 May International Friendly	Czech Republic	2–0	Saudi Arabia	Innsbruck, Austria
Match 649/141	Baroš 15'; Jankulovski 90' (pen.)	ČMFS Report		Stadium: Tivoli-Neu; Attendance: 4,000; Referee: Einwaller (Austria)

30 May International Friendly	Czech Republic	1–0	Costa Rica	Jablonec, Czech Republic
Match 650/142	Lokvenc 82'	ČMFS Report		Stadium: Stadion Střelnice; Attendance: 6,244; Referee: Bede (Hungary)

3 June International Friendly	Czech Republic	3–0	Trinidad and Tobago	Prague, Czech Republic
Match 651/143	Koller 6', 40'; Nedvěd 22'	ČMFS Report		Stadium: Letná; Attendance: 15,910; Referee: Johannesson (Sweden)

12 June 2006 FIFA World Cup; Group E	United States	0–3	Czech Republic	Gelsenkirchen, Germany
18:00 CEST (UTC+02); Match 652/144		FIFA Report	Koller 5'; Rosický 36', 76'	Stadium: FIFA WM Stadion Gelsenkirchen; Attendance: 52,000; Referee: Amarilla (Paraguay)

17 June 2006 FIFA World Cup; Group E	Czech Republic	0–2	Ghana	Cologne, Germany
18:00 CEST (UTC+02); Match 653/145		FIFA Report	Gyan 2'; Muntari 82'	Stadium: FIFA WM Stadion Köln; Attendance: 45,000; Referee: Elizondo (Argentina)

22 June 2006 FIFA World Cup; Group E	Czech Republic	0–2	Italy	Hamburg, Germany
16:00 CEST (UTC+02); Match 654/146		FIFA Report	Materazzi 26'; Inzaghi 87'	Stadium: FIFA WM Stadion Hamburg; Attendance: 50,000; Referee: Archundia (Mexico)

16 August International Friendly	Czech Republic	1–3	Serbia	Uherské Hradiště, Czech Republic
Match 655/147	Štajner 3'	ČMFS Report	Lazović 41'; Pantelić 54'; Trišović 70'	Stadium: Městský stadion Attendance: 8,047; Referee: Drabek (Austria)

2 September UEFA Euro 2008; Qualifying Group D	Czech Republic	2–1	Wales	Teplice, Czech Republic
20:15 CEST (UTC+02); Match 656/148	Lafata 76', 89'	UEFA Report	Jiránek 85' (o.g.)	Stadium: Na Stínadlech; Attendance: 16,200; Referee: Eriksson (Sweden)

8 September UEFA Euro 2008; Qualifying Group D	Slovakia	0–3	Czech Republic	Bratislava, Slovakia
20:15 CEST (UTC+02); Match 657/149		UEFA Report	Sionko 10', 21'; Koller 57'	Stadium: Tehelné pole Attendance: 27,683; Referee: Bennett (England)

7 October UEFA Euro 2008; Qualifying Group D	Czech Republic	7–0	San Marino	Liberec, Czech Republic
17:15 CEST (UTC+02); Match 658/150	Kulič 15'; Polák 22'; Baroš 32', 68'; Koller 42', 52'; Jarolím 49'	UEFA Report		Stadium: U Nisy; Attendance: 9,514; Referee: Aliyev (Azerbaijan)

11 October UEFA Euro 2008; Qualifying Group D	Republic of Ireland	1–1	Czech Republic	Dublin, Republic of Ireland
19:30 BST (UTC+01); Match 659/151	Kilbane 62'	UEFA Report	Koller 64'	Stadium: Lansdowne Road; Attendance: 35,500; Referee: Layec (France)

15 November International Friendly	Czech Republic	1–1	Denmark	Prague, Czech Republic
Match 660/152	Baroš 90'	ČMFS Report	Løvenkrands 28'	Stadium: Letná; Attendance: 6,852; Referee: Skomina (Slovenia)

== 2007 ==
7 February International Friendly	Belgium	0–2	Czech Republic	Brussels, Belgium
Match 661/153		ČMFS Report	Koller 6'; Kulič 75'	Stadium: King Baudouin Stadium; Attendance: 12,500; Referee: Granat (Poland)

24 March UEFA Euro 2008; Qualifying Group D	Czech Republic	1–2	Germany	Prague, Czech Republic
20:45 CET (UTC+01); Match 662/154	Baroš 77'	UEFA Report	Kurányi 42', 62'	Stadium: Letná; Attendance: 17,821; Referee: Rosetti (Italy)

28 March UEFA Euro 2008; Qualifying Group D	Czech Republic	1–0	Cyprus	Liberec, Czech Republic
17:25 CEST (UTC+02); Match 663/155	Kováč 22'	UEFA Report		Stadium: U Nisy; Attendance: 9,310; Referee: Bebek (Croatia)

2 June UEFA Euro 2008; Qualifying Group D	Wales	0–0	Czech Republic	Cardiff, Wales
20:00 BST (UTC+01); Match 664/156		UEFA Report		Stadium: Millennium Stadium; Attendance: 30,714; Referee: Allaerts (Belgium)

22 August International Friendly	Austria	1–1	Czech Republic	Vienna, Austria
Match 665/157	Harnik 78'	ČMFS Report	Koller 33'	Stadium: Ernst-Happel-Stadion; Attendance: 24,500; Referee: Iturralde González (Spain)

8 September UEFA Euro 2008; Qualifying Group D	San Marino	0–3	Czech Republic	Serravalle, San Marino
20:15 CEST (UTC+02); Match 666/158		UEFA Report	Rosický 33'; Jankulovski 75'; Koller 90+3'	Stadium: Stadio Olimpico; Attendance: 3,412; Referee: Filipović (Serbia)

12 September UEFA Euro 2008; Qualifying Group D	Czech Republic	1–0	Republic of Ireland	Prague, Czech Republic
20:30 CEST (UTC+02); Match 667/159	Jankulovski 15'	UEFA Report		Stadium: Letná; Attendance: 16,648; Referee: Vassaras (Greece)

17 October UEFA Euro 2008; Qualifying Group D	Germany	0–3	Czech Republic	Munich, Germany
20:45 CEST (UTC+02); Match 668/160		UEFA Report	Sionko 2'; Matějovský 23'; Plašil 63'	Stadium: Allianz Arena; Attendance: 66,600; Referee: Webb (England)

17 November UEFA Euro 2008; Qualifying Group D	Czech Republic	3–1	Slovakia	Prague, Czech Republic
20:30 CET (UTC+01); Match 669/161	Grygera 13'; Kulič 76'; Rosický 83'	UEFA Report	Kadlec 79' (o.g.)	Stadium: Letná; Attendance: 15,681; Referee: Asumaa (Finland)

21 November UEFA Euro 2008; Qualifying Group D	Cyprus	0–2	Czech Republic	Nicosia, Cyprus
18:30 EET (UTC+02); Match 670/162		UEFA Report	Pudil 11'; Koller 74'	Stadium: GSP Stadium; Attendance: 8,000; Referee: Paniashvili (Georgia)

== 2008 ==
6 February Cyprus International Football Tournament	Poland	2–0	Czech Republic	Larnaca, Cyprus
Match 671/163	Łobodziński 6'; Lewandowski 29'	ČMFS Report		Stadium: Zenon Stadium; Attendance: 1,100; Referee: Stamitis (Cyprus)

26 March International Friendly	Denmark	1–1	Czech Republic	Herning, Denmark
Match 672/164	Bendtner 25'	ČMFS Report	Koller 42'	Stadium: SAS Arena; Attendance: 10,456; Referee: Mikulski (Poland)

27 May International Friendly	Czech Republic	2–0	Lithuania	Prague, Czech Republic
Match 673/165	Koller 39', 62'	ČMFS Report		Stadium: Stadion Eden; Attendance: 14,220; Referee: Hriňák (Slovakia)

30 May International Friendly	Czech Republic	3–1	Scotland	Prague, Czech Republic
Match 674/166	Sionko 60', 90'; Kadlec 84'	ČMFS Report	Clarkson 85'	Stadium: Letná; Attendance: 11,314; Referee: Braamhaar (Netherlands)

7 June UEFA Euro 2008; Group A	Switzerland	0–1	Czech Republic	Basel, Switzerland
18:00 CEST (UTC+02); Match 675/167		UEFA Report	Svěrkoš 71'	Stadium: St. Jakob-Park; Attendance: 39,730; Referee: Rosetti (Italy)

11 June UEFA Euro 2008; Group A	Czech Republic	1–3	Portugal	Geneva, Switzerland
18:00 CEST (UTC+02); Match 676/168	Sionko 17'	UEFA Report	Deco 8'; Ronaldo 63'; Quaresma 90+1'	Stadium: Stade de Genève; Attendance: 29,016; Referee: Vassaras (Greece)

15 June UEFA Euro 2008; Group A	Turkey	3–2	Czech Republic	Geneva, Switzerland
20:45 CEST (UTC+02); Match 677/169	Arda 75'; Nihat 87', 89'	UEFA Report	Koller 34'; Plašil 62'	Stadium: Stade de Genève; Attendance: 29,016; Referee: Fröjdfeldt (Sweden)

20 August International Friendly	England	2–2	Czech Republic	London, England
Match 678/170	Brown 45'; J. Cole 90+2'	ČMFS Report	Baroš 22'; Jankulovski 48'	Stadium: Wembley; Attendance: 69,738; Referee: Hauge (Norway)

10 September 2010 FIFA World Cup; Qualification Group 3	Northern Ireland	0–0	Czech Republic	Belfast, Northern Ireland
19:45 BST (UTC+01); Match 679/171		FIFA Report		Stadium: Windsor Park; Attendance: 12,882; Referee: Bebek (Croatia)

11 October 2010 FIFA World Cup; Qualification Group 3	Poland	2–1	Czech Republic	Chorzów, Poland
20:30 CEST (UTC+02); Match 680/172	Brożek 27'; Błaszczykowski 53'	FIFA Report	Fenin 87'	Stadium: Stadion Śląski; Attendance: 38,293; Referee: Stark (Germany)

15 October 2010 FIFA World Cup; Qualification Group 3	Czech Republic	1–0	Slovenia	Teplice, Czech Republic
17:30 CEST (UTC+02); Match 681/173	Sionko 63'	FIFA Report		Stadium: Na Stínadlech; Attendance: 15,220; Referee: Atkinson (England)

19 November 2010 FIFA World Cup; Qualification Group 3	San Marino	0–3	Czech Republic	Serravalle, San Marino
20:30 CET (UTC+01); Match 682/174		FIFA Report	Kováč 47'; Pospěch 53'; Necid 66'	Stadium: Stadio Olimpico; Attendance: 1,318; Referee: Kaasik (Estonia)

== 2009 ==
11 February International Friendly	Morocco	0–0	Czech Republic	Casablanca, Morocco
Match 683/175		ČMFS Report		Attendance: 38,000; Referee: Alakim (Tunisia)

28 March 2010 FIFA World Cup; Qualification Group 3	Slovenia	0–0	Czech Republic	Maribor, Slovenia
20:45 CET (UTC+01); Match 684/176		FIFA Report		Stadium: Ljudski vrt Attendance: 12,500; Referee: Proença (Portugal)

1 April 2010 FIFA World Cup; Qualification Group 3	Czech Republic	1–2	Slovakia	Prague, Czech Republic
20:30 CEST (UTC+02); Match 685/177	Jankulovski 30'	FIFA Report	Šesták 22'; Jendrišek 82'	Stadium: Letná; Attendance: 14,956; Referee: Undiano Mallenco (Spain)

5 June International Friendly	Czech Republic	1–0	Malta	Jablonec, Czech Republic
Match 686/178	Necid 77'	ČMFS Report		Stadium: Stadion Střelnice; Attendance: 6,920; Referee: Fautrel (France)

12 August International Friendly	Czech Republic	3–1	Belgium	Teplice, Czech Republic
Match 687/179	Hubník 27'; Baroš 42' (pen.); Rozehnal 78'	ČMFS Report	Vertonghen 12'	Stadium: Na Stínadlech; Attendance: 13,890; Referee: Sippel (Germany)

5 September 2010 FIFA World Cup; Qualification Group 3	Slovakia	2–2	Czech Republic	Bratislava, Slovakia
20:30 CEST (UTC+02); Match 688/180	Šesták 59'; Hamšík 73' (pen.)	FIFA Report	Pudil 68'; Baroš 83'	Stadium: Tehelné pole Attendance: 23,800; Referee: Øvrebø (Norway)

9 September 2010 FIFA World Cup; Qualification Group 3	Czech Republic	7–0	San Marino	Uherské Hradiště, Czech Republic
17:20 CEST (UTC+02); Match 689/181	Baroš 28', 44', 45+3' (pen.), 66'; Svěrkoš 47', 90+4'; Necid 86'	FIFA Report		Stadium: Městský stadion Attendance: 8,121; Referee: Amirkhanya (Armenia)

10 October 2010 FIFA World Cup; Qualification Group 3	Czech Republic	2–0	Poland	Prague, Czech Republic
20:30 CEST (UTC+02); Match 690/182	Necid 51'; Plašil 72'	FIFA Report		Stadium: Letná; Attendance: 14,010; Referee: Larsen (Denmark)

14 October 2010 FIFA World Cup; Qualification Group 3	Czech Republic	0–0	Northern Ireland	Prague, Czech Republic
20:30 CEST (UTC+02); Match 691/183		FIFA Report		Stadium: Synot Tip Arena; Attendance: 8,002; Referee: Duhamel (France)

15 November UAE International Cup	United Arab Emirates	0–0 (3–2 p)	Czech Republic	Al Ain, United Arab Emirates
Match 692/184		ČMFS Report		Stadium: Tahnoun bin Mohammed Stadium; Attendance: 5,000; Referee: Sulaiman (Jordan)

18 November UAE International Cup	Czech Republic	0–2	Azerbaijan	Al Ain, United Arab Emirates
Match 693/185		ČMFS Report	Javadov 25'; Abishov 89'	Stadium: Tahnoun bin Mohammed Stadium; Attendance: 500; Referee: Farid Ali (UAE)

== 2010 ==
3 March International Friendly	Scotland	1–0	Czech Republic	Glasgow, Scotland
Match 694/186	Brown 62'	ČMFS Report		Stadium: Hampden Park; Attendance: 26,530; Referee: Fautrel (France)

22 May International Friendly	Czech Republic	1–2	Turkey	Harrison, New Jersey, USA
Match 695/187	Černý 81'	ČMFS Report	Arda 32'; Nihat 47'	Stadium: Red Bull Arena; Attendance: 16,371; Referee: Geiger (USA)

25 May International Friendly	Czech Republic	4–2	United States	East Hartford, Connecticut, USA
Match 696/188	Sivok 44'; Polák 58'; Fenin 77'; Necid 90'	ČMFS Report	Edu 17'; Gomez 66'	Stadium: Rentschler Field; Attendance: 36,218; Referee: Moráles (Mexico)

11 August International Friendly	Czech Republic	4–1	Latvia	Liberec, Czech Republic
Match 697/189	Bednář 49'; Fenin 54'; Pospěch 74'; Necid 77'	ČMFS Report	Cauņa 90+2'	Stadium: Stadion u Nisy; Attendance: 7,456; Referee: Dankovskyj (Ukraine)

7 September UEFA Euro 2012; Qualifying Group I	Czech Republic	0–1	Lithuania	Olomouc, Czech Republic
20:15 CEST (UTC+02); Match 698/190		UEFA Report	Šernas 25'	Stadium: Andrův stadion Attendance: 12,038; Referee: Yefet (Israel)

8 October UEFA Euro 2012; Qualifying Group I	Czech Republic	1–0	Scotland	Prague, Czech Republic
20:15 CEST (UTC+02); Match 699/191	Hubník 69'	UEFA Report		Stadium: Synot Tip Arena; Attendance: 16,800; Referee: Bebek (Croatia)

12 October UEFA Euro 2012; Qualifying Group I	Liechtenstein	0–2	Czech Republic	Vaduz, Liechtenstein
20:00 CEST (UTC+02); Match 700/192		UEFA Report	Necid 12'; V. Kadlec 29'	Stadium: Rheinpark Stadion; Attendance: 2,555; Referee: Sukhina (Russia)

17 November International Friendly	Denmark	0–0	Czech Republic	Aarhus, Denmark
Match 701/193		ČMFS Report		Stadium: NRGi Park; Attendance: 9,184; Referee: Webb (England)

== 2011 ==
9 February International Friendly	Croatia	4–2	Czech Republic	Pula, Croatia
Match 702/194	Eduardo 9'; Kalinić 13', 61'; Iličević 75'	ČMFS Report	Sivok 20'; Rosický 45'	Stadium: Stadion Aldo Drosina; Attendance: 10,000; Referee: Orsato (Italy)

25 March UEFA Euro 2012; Qualifying Group I	Spain	2–1	Czech Republic	Granada, Spain
22:00 CET (UTC+01); Match 703/195	Villa 69', 73' (pen.)	UEFA Report	Plašil 29'	Stadium: Estadio Nuevo Los Cármenes; Attendance: 16,200; Referee: Kassai (Hungary)

29 March UEFA Euro 2012; Qualifying Group I	Czech Republic	2–0	Liechtenstein	České Budějovice, Czech Republic
17:30 CEST (UTC+02); Match 704/196	Baroš 3'; M. Kadlec 70'	UEFA Report		Stadium: Stadion Střelecký ostrov Attendance: 6,700; Referee: Hategan (Romania)

4 June Kirin Cup	Peru	0–0	Czech Republic	Matsumoto, Japan
Match 705/197		ČMFS Report		Attendance: 9,000; Referee: Sato (Japan)

7 June Kirin Cup	Japan	0–0	Czech Republic	Yokohama, Japan
Match 706/198		ČMFS Report		Stadium: International Stadium Yokohama; Attendance: 65,856; Referee: Atkinson (England)

10 August International Friendly	Norway	3–0	Czech Republic	Oslo, Norway
Match 707/199	Abdellaoue 23', 90' (pen.); Riise 72'	ČMFS Report		Stadium: Ullevaal Stadion; Attendance: 12,734; Referee: Black (Northern Ireland)

3 September UEFA Euro 2012; Qualifying Group I	Scotland	2–2	Czech Republic	Glasgow, Scotland
15:00 BST (UTC+01); Match 708/200	Miller 44'; Fletcher 82'	UEFA Report	Plašil 78'; M. Kadlec 90' (pen.)	Stadium: Hampden Park; Attendance: 51,457; Referee: Blom (Netherlands)

6 September International Friendly	Czech Republic	4–0	Ukraine	Prague, Czech Republic
Match 709/201	M. Kadlec 4' (pen.), 12'; Rezek 47'; Kolář 51'	ČMFS Report		Stadium: Generali Arena; Attendance: 7,322; Referee: Trutz (Slovakia)

7 October UEFA Euro 2012; Qualifying Group I	Czech Republic	0–2	Spain	Prague, Czech Republic
20:45 CEST (UTC+02); Match 710/202		UEFA Report	Mata 6'; Alonso 23'	Stadium: Generali Arena; Attendance: 17,873; Referee: Tagliavento (Italy)

11 October UEFA Euro 2012; Qualifying Group I	Lithuania	1–4	Czech Republic	Kaunas, Lithuania
21:45 EEST (UTC+03); Match 711/203	Šernas 68' (pen.)	UEFA Report	M. Kadlec 2' (pen.), 85' (pen.); Rezek 16', 45'	Stadium: S. Darius and S. Girėnas Stadium; Attendance: 4,500; Referee: Fernández (Spain)

11 November UEFA Euro 2012; Qualifying play-off	Czech Republic	2–0	Montenegro	Prague, Czech Republic
20:15 CST (UTC+01); Match 712/204	Pilař 63'; Sivok 90+2'	UEFA Report		Stadium: Generali Arena; Attendance: 14,560; Referee: Atkinson (England)

15 November UEFA Euro 2012; Qualifying play-off	Montenegro	0–1 (0–3 agg.)	Czech Republic	Podgorica, Montenegro
20:15 CST (UTC+01); Match 713/205		UEFA Report	Jiráček 81'	Stadium: Podgorica City Stadium; Attendance: 12,000; Referee: Rizzoli (Italy)

== 2012 ==
29 February International Friendly	Republic of Ireland	1–1	Czech Republic	Dublin, Ireland
Match 714/206	Cox 86'	ČMFS Report	Baroš 50'	Stadium: Aviva Stadium; Attendance: 37,741; Referee: De Sousa (Portugal)

26 May International Friendly	Israel	1–2	Czech Republic	Bad Waltersdorf, Austria
Match 715/207	Shechter 45'	ČMFS Report	Baroš 17' (pen.); Lafata 90'	Stadium: Stadion Hartberg; Attendance: 1,500; Referee: Trutz (Austria)

1 June International Friendly	Czech Republic	1–2	Hungary	Prague, Czech Republic
Match 716/208	M. Kadlec 24' (pen.)	ČMFS Report	Dzsudzsák 6'; Gyurcsó 88'	Stadium: Generali Arena; Attendance: 17,102; Referee: Probert (England)

8 June UEFA Euro 2012; Group A	Russia	4–1	Czech Republic	Wrocław, Poland
20:45 CEST (UTC+02); Match 717/209	Dzagoev 15', 79'; Shirokov 24'; Pavlyuchenko 82'	UEFA Report	Pilař 52'	Stadium: Municipal Stadium; Attendance: 40,803; Referee: Webb (England)

12 June UEFA Euro 2012; Group A	Greece	1–2	Czech Republic	Wrocław, Poland
18:00 CEST (UTC+02); Match 718/210	Gekas 53'	UEFA Report	Jiráček 3'; Pilař 6'	Stadium: Municipal Stadium; Attendance: 41,105; Referee: Lannoy (France)

16 June UEFA Euro 2012; Group A	Czech Republic	1–0	Poland	Wrocław, Poland
20:45 CEST (UTC+02); Match 719/211	Jiráček 72'	UEFA Report		Stadium: Municipal Stadium; Attendance: 41,480; Referee: Thomson (Scotland)

21 June UEFA Euro 2012; Quarter final	Czech Republic	0–1	Portugal	Warsaw, Poland
20:45 CEST (UTC+02); Match 720/212		UEFA Report	Ronaldo 79'	Stadium: National Stadium; Attendance: 55,590; Referee: Webb (England)

15 August International Friendly	Ukraine	0–0	Czech Republic	Lviv, Ukraine
Match 721/213		ČMFS Report		Stadium: Arena Lviv; Attendance: 33,153; Referee: Mažić (Serbia)

8 September 2014 FIFA World Cup; Qualification Group B	Denmark	0–0	Czech Republic	Copenhagen, Denmark
20:15 CEST (UTC+02); Match 722/214		FIFA Report		Stadium: Parken Stadium; Attendance: 24,004; Referee: Stark (Germany)

11 September International Friendly	Czech Republic	0–1	Finland	Teplice, Czech Republic
Match 723/215		ČMFS Report	Pukki 43'	Stadium: Na Stínadlech; Attendance: 9,053; Referee: Siejewicz (Poland)

12 October 2014 FIFA World Cup; Qualification Group B	Czech Republic	3–1	Malta	Plzeň, Czech Republic
18:00 CEST (UTC+02); Match 724/216	Gebre Selassie 34'; Pekhart 52'; Rezek 67'	FIFA Report	Briffa 38'	Stadium: Stadion města Plzně; Attendance: 10,358; Referee: Salmanov (Azerbaijan)

16 October 2014 FIFA World Cup; Qualification Group B	Czech Republic	0–0	Bulgaria	Prague, Czech Republic
20:00 CEST (UTC+02); Match 725/217		FIFA Report		Stadium: Generali Arena; Attendance: 16,163; Referee: Bezborodov (Russia)

14 November International Friendly	Czech Republic	3–0	Slovakia	Olomouc, Czech Republic
Match 726/218	Lafata 3', 6'; Dočkal 73'	ČMFS Report		Stadium: Andrův stadion Attendance: 11,464; Referee: Lechner (Austria)

== 2013 ==
6 February International Friendly	Turkey	0–2	Czech Republic	Manisa, Turkey
Match 727/219		ČMFS Report	Krejčí 4'; Lafata 28'	Stadium: 19 Mayıs Stadium; Attendance: 13,000; Referee: Kuipers (Netherlands)

22 March 2014 FIFA World Cup; Qualification Group B	Czech Republic	0–3	Denmark	Olomouc, Czech Republic
20:30 CET (UTC+01); Match 728/220		Report	Cornelius 57'; Kjær 67'; Zimling 83'	Stadium: Andrův stadion Attendance: 12,288; Referee: De Sousa (Portugal)

26 March 2014 FIFA World Cup; Qualification Group B	Armenia	0–3	Czech Republic	Yerevan, Armenia
20:00 AMT (UTC+04); Match 729/221		Report	Vydra 47', 81'; Kolář 90+4'	Stadium: Republican Stadium; Attendance: 14,403; Referee: Balaj (Romania)

7 June 2014 FIFA World Cup; Qualification Group B	Czech Republic	0–0	Italy	Prague, Czech Republic
20:45 CEST (UTC+02); Match 730/222		Report		Stadium: Generali Arena; Attendance: 18,235; Referee: Moen (Norway)

14 August International Friendly	Hungary	1–1	Czech Republic	Budapest, Hungary
Match 731/223	Dzsudzsák 57' (pen.)	ČMFS Report	Kozák 23'	Stadium: Ferenc Puskás Stadium; Attendance: 14,500; Referee: Howard Webb (England)

6 September 2014 FIFA World Cup; Qualification Group B	Czech Republic	1–2	Armenia	Prague, Czech Republic
18:00 CEST (UTC+02); Match 732/224	Rosický 70'	Report	Mkrtchyan 31'; Ghazaryan 90'	Stadium: Eden Arena; Attendance: 17,628; Referee: Gautier (France)

10 September 2014 FIFA World Cup; Qualification Group B	Italy	2–1	Czech Republic	Turin, Italy
20:45 CEST (UTC+02); Match 733/225	Chiellini 51'; Balotelli 54' (pen.)	Report	Kozák 19'	Stadium: Juventus Stadium; Attendance: 35,299; Referee: Eriksson (Sweden)

11 October 2014 FIFA World Cup; Qualification Group B	Malta	1–4	Czech Republic	Ta' Qali, Malta
19:30 CEST (UTC+02); Match 734/226	Mifsud 47'	Report	Hübschman 3'; Lafata 33'; Kadlec 51'; Pekhart 90'	Stadium: Ta' Qali National Stadium; Attendance: 4,530; Referee: Jug (Slovenia)

15 October 2014 FIFA World Cup; Qualification Group B	Bulgaria	0–1	Czech Republic	Sofia, Bulgaria
21:15 EEST (UTC+03); Match 735/227		Report	Dočkal 51'	Stadium: Vasil Levski National Stadium; Attendance: 25,464; Referee: Kassai (Hungary)

15 November International Friendly	Czech Republic	2–0	Canada	Olomouc, Czech Republic
Match 736/228	Čelůstka 3'; Hořava 81'	ČMFS Report		Stadium: Andrův stadion Attendance: 9,749; Referee: Markham (Wales)

== 2014 ==
5 March International Friendly	Czech Republic	2–2	Norway	Prague, Czech Republic
Match 737/229	Rosický 11'; Vydra 39'	ČMFS Report	Elyounoussi 21'; Pedersen 88'	Stadium: Eden Arena; Attendance: 17,039; Referee: Çakır (Turkey)

21 May International Friendly	Finland	2–2	Czech Republic	Helsinki, Finland
Match 738/230	Pukki 18', 20'	ČMFS Report	Vydra 19'; Hušbauer 36'	Stadium: Helsinki Olympic Stadium; Attendance: 6,547; Referee: Drachta (Austria)

3 June International Friendly	Czech Republic	1–2	Austria	Olomouc, Czech Republic
Match 739/231	Hořava 42'	ČMFS Report	Sabitzer 34'; Baumgartlinger 72'	Stadium: Andrův stadion Attendance: 10,653; Referee: van Boekel (Netherlands)

3 September International Friendly	Czech Republic	0–1	United States	Prague, Czech Republic
Match 740/232		ČMFS Report	Bedoya 39'	Stadium: Generali Arena; Attendance: 12,673; Referee: Vad (Hungary)

9 September UEFA Euro 2016; Qualifying Group A	Czech Republic	2–1	Netherlands	Prague, Czech Republic
20:45 CEST (UTC+02); Match 741/233	Dočkal 22'; Pilař 90+1'	UEFA Report	de Vrij 55'	Stadium: Generali Arena; Attendance: 17,946; Referee: Rocchi (Italy)

10 October UEFA Euro 2016; Qualifying Group A	Turkey	1–2	Czech Republic	Istanbul, Turkey
21:45 EEST (UTC+03); Match 742/234	Bulut 8'	UEFA Report	Sivok 15'; Dočkal 58'	Stadium: Şükrü Saracoğlu Stadium; Attendance: 35,000; Referee: Eriksson (Sweden)

13 October UEFA Euro 2016; Qualifying Group A	Kazakhstan	2–4	Czech Republic	Astana, Kazakhstan
22:00 KT (UTC+06); Match 743/235	Logvinenko 84', 90+1'	UEFA Report	Dočkal 13'; Lafata 44'; Krejčí 56'; Necid 88'	Stadium: Astana Arena; Attendance: 18,000; Referee: Gestranius (Finland)

16 November UEFA Euro 2016; Qualifying Group A	Czech Republic	2–1	Iceland	Plzeň, Czech Republic
20:45 CET (UTC+01); Match 744/236	Kadeřábek 45+1'; Halldórsson 61' (o.g.)	UEFA Report	R. Sigurðsson 9'	Stadium: Doosan Arena; Attendance: 11,324; Referee: Stark (Germany)

== 2015 ==
28 March UEFA Euro 2016; Qualifying Group A	Czech Republic	1–1	Latvia	Prague, Czech Republic
18:00 CET (UTC+01); Match 745/237	Pilař 90'	Report	Višņakovs 30'	Stadium: Eden Arena; Attendance: 13,722; Referee: Estrada (Spain)

31 March International Friendly	Slovakia	1–0	Czech Republic	Žilina, Slovakia
Match 746/238	Duda 49'	ČMFS Report		Stadium: Štadión pod Dubňom; Attendance: 10,594; Referee: Vad (Hungary)

12 June UEFA Euro 2016; Qualifying Group A	Iceland	2–1	Czech Republic	Reykjavík, Iceland
18:45 WET (UTC±00:00); Match 747/239	Gunnarsson 60'; Sigþórsson 76'	Report	Dočkal 55'	Stadium: Laugardalsvöllur; Attendance: 15,500; Referee: Collum (Scotland)

3 September UEFA Euro 2016; Qualifying Group A	Czech Republic	2–1	Kazakhstan	Plzeň, Czech Republic
20:45 CEST (UTC+02); Match 748/240	Škoda 74', 86'	Report	Logvinenko 21'	Stadium: Doosan Arena; Attendance: 10,572; Referee: Strömbergsson (Sweden)

6 September UEFA Euro 2016; Qualifying Group A	Latvia	1–2	Czech Republic	Riga, Latvia
18:00 EEST (UTC+03); Match 749/241	Zjuzins 73'	Report	Limberský 13'; Darida 25'	Stadium: Skonto Stadium; Attendance: 7,913; Referee: Aytekin (Germany)

10 October UEFA Euro 2016; Qualifying Group A	Czech Republic	0–2	Turkey	Prague, Czech Republic
20:45 CEST (UTC+02); Match 750/242		Report	İnan 62' (pen.); Çalhanoğlu 79'	Stadium: Generali Arena; Attendance: 17,190; Referee: Atkinson (England)

13 October UEFA Euro 2016; Qualifying Group A	Netherlands	2–3	Czech Republic	Amsterdam, Netherlands
20:45 CEST (UTC+02); Match 751/243	Huntelaar 70'; Van Persie 83'	Report	Kadeřábek 24'; Šural 35'; Van Persie 66' (o.g.)	Stadium: Amsterdam ArenA; Attendance: 48,000; Referee: Skomina (Slovenia)

13 November International Friendly	Czech Republic	4–1	Serbia	Ostrava, Czech Republic
Match 752/244	Sivok 17'; Necid 63' (pen.); Krejčí 82'; Zahustel 90'	Report	Škuletić 78'	Stadium: Městský Stadion; Attendance: 14,975

17 November International Friendly	Poland	3–1	Czech Republic	Wrocław, Poland
Match 753/245	Milik 3'; Jodłowiec 12'; Groscki 70'	Report	Krejčí 41'	Stadium: Stadion Miejski; Attendance: 40,793; Referee: Andó-Szabó (Hungary)

== 2016 ==
24 March 2016 International Friendly	Czech Republic	0–1	Scotland	Prague, Czech Republic
20:45 CET (UTC+01)		Report	Anya 10'	Stadium: Generali Arena; Attendance: 14,580; Referee: Paul McLaughlin (Republic of Ireland)

29 March 2016 International Friendly	Sweden	1–1	Czech Republic	Solna, Sweden
20:30 CEST (UTC+02)	Berg 14'	Report	Vydra 26'	Stadium: Friends Arena; Attendance: 18,745; Referee: Bas Nijhuis (Netherlands)

27 May 2016 International Friendly	Czech Republic	6–0	Malta	Kufstein, Austria
18:00 CEST (UTC+02)	Plašil 15'; Škoda 21'; Hubník 40'; Lafata 74'; Necid 81'; Shick 90+1'	Report		Stadium: Kufstein Arena; Attendance: 1,000; Referee: Ouschan (Austria)

1 June 2016 International Friendly	Russia	1–2	Czech Republic	Innsbruck, Austria
18:00 CEST (UTC+02)	Kokorin 6'	Report	Rosický 49'; Necid 90'	Stadium: Tivoli-Neu Stadion; Attendance: 650; Referee: Robert Schorgenhofer (Austria)

5 June 2016 International Friendly	Czech Republic	1–2	South Korea	Prague, Czech Republic
15:10 CEST (UTC+02)	Suchý 46'	Report	Yoon Bit-garam 26'; Suk Hyun-jun 40'	Stadium: Eden Arena; Attendance: 16,490; Referee: Daniel Stefański (Poland)

13 June 2016 UEFA Euro 2016 Group Stage	Spain	1–0	Czech Republic	Toulouse, France
15:00 CEST (UTC+02)	Piqué 87'	Report		Stadium: Stadium Municipal; Attendance: 29,400; Referee: Marciniak (Poland)

17 June 2016 UEFA Euro 2016 Group Stage	Czech Republic	2–2	Croatia	Saint-Étienne, France
18:00 CEST (UTC+02)	Škoda 75'; Necid 90+3' (pen.)	Report	Perišić 37'; Rakitić 59'	Stadium: Stade Geoffroy-Guichard; Attendance: 38,376; Referee: Clattenburg (England)

21 June 2016 UEFA Euro 2016 Group Stage	Czech Republic	0–2	Turkey	Lens, France
21:00 CEST (UTC+02)		Report	Yılmaz 10'; Tufan 65'	Stadium: Stade Bollaert-Delelis; Attendance: 32,826; Referee: Collum (Scotland)

31 August 2016 International Friendly	Czech Republic	3–0	Armenia	Mladá Boleslav, Czech Republic
19:15 CEST (UTC+02)	Krejčí 4'; Kadlec 34'; Kopic 86'	Report		Stadium: Městský stadion (Mladá Boleslav); Attendance: 4,351; Referee: Vladimir Vnuk (Slovakia)

4 September 2016 2018 FIFA World Cup; Qualification Group C	Czech Republic	0–0	Northern Ireland	Prague, Czech Republic
20:45 CEST (UTC+02)		FIFA Report		Stadium: Generali Arena; Attendance: 10,731; Referee: Sidiropoulos (Greece)

8 October 2016 2018 FIFA World Cup; Qualification Group C	Germany	3–0	Czech Republic	Hamburg, Germany
20:45 CEST (UTC+02)	Müller 13', 65'; Kroos 49'	FIFA report		Stadium: Volksparkstadion; Attendance: 51,299; Referee: Hațegan (Romania)

11 October 2016 2018 FIFA World Cup; Qualification Group C	Czech Republic	0–0	Azerbaijan	Ostrava, Czech Republic
20:45 CEST (UTC+02)		FIFA report		Stadium: Městský Stadion; Attendance: 12,148; Referee: Jug (Slovenia)

11 November 2016 2018 FIFA World Cup; Qualification Group C	Czech Republic	2–1	Norway	Prague, Czech Republic
20:45 CET (UTC+01)	Krmenčík 11'; Zmrhal 47'	FIFA report	King 87'	Stadium: Eden Arena; Attendance: 16,411; Referee: Nijhuis (Netherlands)

15 November 2016 International Friendly	Czech Republic	1–1	Denmark	Mladá Boleslav, Czech Republic
20:30 CET (UTC+01)	Barák 8'	Report	N. Jørgensen 39'	Stadium: Městský stadion (Mladá Boleslav); Attendance: 1,763; Referee: Manuel Schüttengruber (Austria)

== 2017 ==
22 March 2017 International Friendly	Czech Republic	3–0	Lithuania	Ústí nad Labem, Czech Republic
18:00 (18:00 UTC+1)	Hořava 48' (pen.); Jankto 64'; Krmenčík 79'	Report		Stadium: Městský Stadion; Attendance: 3,959; Referee: Alain Bieri (Switzerland)

26 March 2017 2018 FIFA World Cup Qualifying	San Marino	0–6	Czech Republic	Serravalle, San Marino
18:00 (18:00 UTC+1)		Report	Barák 17'; Darida 19'; Barák 24'; Gebre Selassie 26'; Krmenčík 43'; Darida 77' (pen.)	Stadium: San Marino Stadium; Attendance: 1,023; Referee: Kristo Tohver (Estonia)

5 June 2017 International Friendly	Belgium	2–1	Czech Republic	Brussels, Belgium
20:45 (20:45 UTC+2)	Batshuayi 25'; Fellaini 52'	Report	Krmenčík 29'	Stadium: King Baudouin Stadium; Attendance: 28,000; Referee: Sandro Schärer (Switzerland)

10 June 2017 2018 FIFA World Cup Qualifying	Norway	1–1	Czech Republic	Oslo, Norway
20:45 (20:45 UTC+1)	Søderlund 55' (pen.)	Report (UEFA)	Gebre Selassie 36'	Stadium: Ullevaal Stadion; Attendance: 12,179; Referee: Andre Marriner (England)

1 September 2017 2018 FIFA World Cup Qualifying	Czech Republic	1–2	Germany	Prague, Czech Republic
20:45 (20:45 UTC+1)	Darida 78'	Report (UEFA)	Werner 4'; Hummels 88'	Stadium: Eden Arena; Attendance: 18,093; Referee: Sergei Karasev (Russia)

4 September 2017 2018 FIFA World Cup Qualifying	Northern Ireland	2–0	Czech Republic	Belfast, Northern Ireland
20:45 (20:45 UTC+1)	J. Evans 28'; Brunt 41'	Report		Stadium: Windsor Park; Attendance: 18,167; Referee: Daniele Orsato (Italy)

5 October 2017 2018 FIFA World Cup Qualifying	Azerbaijan	1–2	Czech Republic	Baku, Azerbaijan
18:00 (18:00 UTC+1)	Afran Ismayilov	Report	Kopic; Barák	Stadium: Baku National Stadium; Attendance: 16,200; Referee: Benoît Millot (France)

8 October 2017 2018 FIFA World Cup Qualifying	Czech Republic	5–0	San Marino	Plzeň, Czech Republic
20:45 (20:45 UTC+1)	Krmenčík 8', 23'; Kopic 27'; Novák 71'; Kadlec 83'	Report		Stadium: Doosan Arena; Attendance: 5,625; Referee: Alex Troleis (France)

8 November 2017 International Friendly	Czech Republic	2–1	Iceland	Doha, Qatar
14:45 UTC+3	Souček 19'; Sýkora 65'		Kjartan Finnbogason 77'	Stadium: Abdullah bin Khalifa Stadium; Attendance: 150; Referee: Khamis Al-Kuwari (Qatar)

11 November 2017 International Friendly	Qatar	0–1	Czech Republic	Doha, Qatar
17:30 UTC+3			Barák 15'	Stadium: Abdullah bin Khalifa Stadium; Attendance: 3,000; Referee: Khamis Al-Kuwari (Qatar)

== 2018 ==
23 March 2018 2018 China Cup	Uruguay	2–0	Czech Republic	Nanning, China
19:35 CST (UTC+8)	Suárez 10' (pen.); Cavani 37'	Report		Stadium: Guangxi Sports Center; Attendance: 22,757; Referee: Saoud Al-Athbah (Qatar)

26 March 2018 2018 China Cup	China	1–4	Czech Republic	Nanning, China
19:35 CST (UTC+8)	Xiaodong 5'	Report	Kalas 58'; Schick 59'; Krmenčík 62'; Kadeřábek 78'	Stadium: Guangxi Sports Center; Attendance: 15,815; Referee: Chris Beath (Australia)

1 June 2018 International Friendly	Australia	4–0	Czech Republic	Sankt Pölten, Austria
13:00 CEST (UTC+2)	Leckie 32', 72'; Nabbout 54'; Jugas 80' (o.g.)	Report		Stadium: St. Pölten NV Arena; Attendance: 656; Referee: Alexander Harkam (Austria)

6 June 2018 International Friendly	Nigeria	0–1	Czech Republic	Schwechat, Austria
15:00 CEST (UTC+2)		Report	Kalas 25'	Stadium: Rudolf-Tonn-Stadion; Attendance: 3,200; Referee: Julian Weinberger (Austria)

6 September 2018 2018–19 UEFA Nations League B	Czech Republic	1–2	Ukraine	Uherské Hradiště, Czech Republic
20:45 CEST (20:45 UTC+2)	Schick 4'	Report	Konoplyanka 45+1'; Zinchenko 90+3'	Stadium: Městský fotbalový stadion Miroslava Valenty; Attendance: 7,974; Referee: Anthony Taylor (England)

10 September 2018 International Friendly	Russia	5–1	Czech Republic	Rostov-on-Don, Russia
19:00 MSK (19:00 UTC+3)	Ionov 8', 29' (pen.); Zabolotny 24'; Yerokhin 78'; Poloz 83'	Report	Souček 74'	Stadium: Rostov Arena; Attendance: 45,000; Referee: Äliyar Ağhayev (Azerbaijan)

13 October 2018 2018–19 UEFA Nations League B	Slovakia	1–2	Czech Republic	Trnava, Slovakia
15:00 CEST (15:00 UTC+2)	Hamšík 62'	Report	Krmenčík 52'; Schick 76'	Stadium: Štadión Antona Malatinského; Attendance: 17,111; Referee: Slavko Vinčić (Slovenia)

16 October 2018 2018–19 UEFA Nations League B	Ukraine	1–0	Czech Republic	Kharkiv, Ukraine
20:45 EEST (21:45 UTC+3)	Malinovskyi 43'	Report		Stadium: Metalist Stadium; Attendance: 38,100; Referee: Gediminas Mažeika (Lithuania)

15 November 2018 International Friendly	Poland	0–1	Czech Republic	Gdańsk, Poland
21:45 CET (UTC+1)		Report	Jankto 52'	Stadium: Stadion Energa Gdańsk; Attendance: 34,783; Referee: Stephan Klossner (Switzerland)

19 November 2018 2018–19 UEFA Nations League B	Czech Republic	1–0	Slovakia	Prague, Czech Republic
20:45 CET (20:45 UTC+1)	Schick 32'	Report		Stadium: Sinobo Stadium; Attendance: 16,623; Referee: Alejandro Hernández Hernández (Spain)

== 2019 ==
22 March 2019 UEFA Euro 2020 qualifying Group A	England	5–0	Czech Republic	London, England
19:45 GMT	Sterling 24', 62', 68'; Kane 45+2' (pen.); Kalas 84' (o.g.)	Report		Stadium: Wembley Stadium; Attendance: 82,575; Referee: Artur Soares Dias (Portugal)

26 March 2019 International Friendly	Czech Republic	1–3	Brazil	Prague, Czech Republic
20:45 UTC+1	Pavelka 37'	Report	Firmino 49'; Gabriel Jesus 83', 90'	Stadium: Sinobo Stadium; Attendance: 19,166; Referee: Ovidiu Hațegan (Romania)

7 June 2019 UEFA Euro 2020 qualifying Group A	Czech Republic	2–1	Bulgaria	Prague, Czech Republic
20:45 UTC+2	Schick 20', 50'	Report	Isa 3'	Stadium: Stadion Letná; Attendance: 13,482; Referee: Tamás Bognar (Hungary)

10 June 2019 UEFA Euro 2020 qualifying Group A	Czech Republic	3–0	Montenegro	Olomouc, Czech Republic
20:45 UTC+2	Jankto 18'; Kopitović 49' (o.g.); Schick 82' (pen.)	Report		Stadium: Andrův stadion Attendance: 11,565; Referee: Vladislav Bezborodov (Russia)

7 September 2019 UEFA Euro 2020 qualifying Group A	Kosovo	2–1	Czech Republic	Pristina, Kosovo
15:00 UTC+2	Muriqi 20'; Vojvoda 67'	Report	Schick 16'	Stadium: Fadil Vokrri Stadium; Attendance: 12,678; Referee: Danny Makkelie (Netherlands)

10 September 2019 UEFA Euro 2020 qualifying Group A	Montenegro	0–3	Czech Republic	Podgorica, Montenegro
20:45 UTC+2		Report	Souček 54'; Masopust 58'; Darida 90+5' (pen.)	Stadium: Podgorica City Stadium; Attendance: 5,951; Referee: Ali Palabıyık (Turkey)

11 October 2019 UEFA Euro 2020 qualifying Group A	Czech Republic	2–1	England	Prague, Czech Republic
20:45 UTC+2	Brabec 9'; Ondrášek 85'	Report	Kane 5' (pen.)	Stadium: Sinobo Stadium; Attendance: 18,651; Referee: Damir Skomina (Slovenia)

14 October 2019 International Friendly	Czech Republic	2–3	Northern Ireland	Prague, Czech Republic
19:00 UTC+2	Darida 67'; Král 68'	Report	McNair 9', 40'; Evans 23'	Stadium: Stadion Letná; Attendance: 9,139; Referee: Ivan Kružliak (Slovakia)

14 November 2019 UEFA Euro 2020 qualifying Group A	Czech Republic	2–1	Kosovo	Plzeň, Czech Republic
20:45 UTC+1	Král 71'; Čelůstka 79'	Report	Nuhiu 50'	Stadium: Štruncovy sady Stadion; Attendance: 10,986; Referee: Gianluca Rocchi (Italy)

17 November 2019 UEFA Euro 2020 qualifying Group A	Bulgaria	1–0	Czech Republic	Sofia, Bulgaria
18:00 UTC+1	Bozhikov 56'	Report		Stadium: Vasil Levski National Stadium; Attendance: 0 Referee: Sergei Karasev (Russia)
