= 2019–20 Udinese Calcio season =

Udinese
2019–20 season
- President: Franco Soldati
- Manager: Igor Tudor (until 1 November); Luca Gotti (from 1 November; interim)
- Stadium: Dacia Arena
- Serie A: 13th
- Coppa Italia: Round of 16
- Top goalscorer: League: Kevin Lasagna (10); All: Kevin Lasagna (12)
Home colours	Away colours	Third colours

The 2019–20 Udinese Calcio season was the club's 40th season in Serie A and their 25th consecutive season in the top-flight. The club competed in Serie A and the Coppa Italia.

Former Juventus player Igor Tudor, rehired as coach in March 2019 following the sacking of Davide Nicola, remained as manager into the 2019–20 season.

== Players ==
=== Squad information ===
Last updated on 9 February 2020
Appearances include league matches only

No.	Name	Nat	Position(s)	Date of birth (age)	Signed from	Signed in	Contract ends	Apps.	Goals
Goalkeepers
1	Juan Musso	(Argentina)	GK	6 May 1994 (age 31)	(Argentina) Racing Club	2018	2023	52	0
27	Samuele Perisan	(Italy)	GK	21 August 1997 (age 28)	(Italy) Youth Sector	2016	2020	0	0
88	Nícolas	(Brazil)	GK	12 April 1988 (age 37)	(Italy) Hellas Verona	2018		0	0
Defenders
3	Samir	(Brazil)	CB	5 December 1994 (age 31)	(Brazil) Flamengo	2016	2023	83	4
5	William Troost-Ekong	(Nigeria)	CB	1 September 1993 (age 32)	(Turkey) Bursaspor	2018	2022	55	0
17	Bram Nuytinck	(Netherlands)	CB	4 May 1990 (age 35)	(Belgium) Anderlecht	2017	2021	67	1
18	Hidde ter Avest	(Netherlands)	RB / CB / DM	20 May 1997 (age 28)	(Netherlands) Twente	2018	2022	21	0
19	Jens Stryger Larsen	(Denmark)	RB	21 February 1991 (age 34)	Austria Wien	2017	2021	85	3
50	Rodrigo Becão	(Brazil)	CB	19 January 1996 (age 30)	(Brazil) Bahia	2019	2024	17	1
77	Marvin Zeegelaar	(Netherlands)	LB / LM / LW	12 August 1990 (age 35)	(England) Watford	2020	2022	2	0
87	Sebastian De Maio	(France)	CB	5 March 1987 (age 38)	(Italy) Bologna	2019	2019	29	1
—	Sebastian Prödl	(Austria)	CB / RB / LB	21 June 1987 (age 38)	(England) Watford	2020	2021	0	0
Midfielders
6	Seko Fofana	(Ivory Coast)	CM / DM / AM	7 May 1995 (age 30)	(England) Manchester City	2016	2022	93	11
8	Mato Jajalo	(Bosnia and Herzegovina)	CM / DM / AM	25 May 1988 (age 37)	(Italy) Palermo	2019	2022	17	0
11	Walace	(Brazil)	DM / CM	4 April 1995 (age 30)	(Germany) Hannover 96	2019	2024	9	0
12	Ken Sema	(Sweden)	LM / RM	30 September 1993 (age 32)	(England) Watford	2019	2020	19	2
38	Rolando Mandragora	(Italy)	CM / DM / CB	29 June 1997 (age 28)	(Italy) Juventus	2018	2022	57	3
Forwards
7	Stefano Okaka	(Italy)	CF	9 August 1989 (age 36)	(England) Watford	2019	2020	35	10
10	Rodrigo De Paul	(Argentina)	RW / LW / AM	24 May 1994 (age 31)	(Spain) Valencia	2016	2021	127	22
15	Kevin Lasagna	(Italy)	CF / SS / LW	10 August 1992 (age 33)	(Italy) Carpi	2017	2020	87	22
30	Ilija Nestorovski	(North Macedonia)	CF / SS / LW	12 March 1990 (age 35)	(Italy) Palermo	2019	2022	16	1
91	Łukasz Teodorczyk	(Poland)	CF / SS	3 June 1991 (age 34)	(Belgium) Anderlecht	2018	2022	23	1
Players transferred during the season
2	Francisco Sierralta	(Chile)	CB / RB	6 May 1997 (age 28)	(Spain) Granada	2017	2022	0	0
4	Nicholas Opoku	(Ghana)	CB	11 August 1997 (age 28)	(Tunisia) Club Africain	2018	2022	19	0
23	Ignacio Pussetto	(Argentina)	RW / CF / LW	21 December 1995 (age 30)	(Argentina) Huracán	2018	2023	47	5
72	Antonín Barák	(Czech Republic)	AM / DM / CM	3 December 1994 (age 31)	(Czech Republic) Slavia Prague	2017	2022	50	7
97	Giuseppe Pezzella	(Italy)	LB	29 November 1997 (age 28)	(Italy) Palermo	2017	2022	20	0

== Transfers ==
=== In ===
Date	Pos.	Player	Age	Moving from	Fee	Notes	Source
11 June 2019	MF	(Bosnia and Herzegovina) Mato Jajalo	31	(Italy) Palermo	Free		
6 July 2019	DF	(Brazil) Rodrigo Becão	23	(Brazil) Bahia	€6.2M		
19 July 2019	FW	(Spain) Cristo González	21	(Spain) Real Madrid	Undisclosed		
26 July 2019	FW	(North Macedonia) Ilija Nestorovski	29	(Italy) Palermo	Undisclosed		
24 January 2020	DF	(Netherlands) Marvin Zeegelaar	29	(England) Watford	Undisclosed		
4 February 2020	DF	(Austria) Sebastian Prödl	32	Unattached	Free		

==== Loans in ====
Date	Pos.	Player	Age	Moving from	Fee	Notes	Source

=== Out ===
Date	Pos.	Player	Age	Moving to	Fee	Notes	Source
2 July 2019	MF	(Switzerland) Valon Behrami	34	(Switzerland) Sion	Free	End of contract	
17 July 2019	DF	(Mali) Molla Wagué	28	(France) Nantes	Undisclosed		
28 July 2019	FW	(Venezuela) Darwin Machís	26	(Spain) Granada	Undisclosed		
14 January 2020	FW	(Argentina) Ignacio Pussetto	24	(England) Watford	€8M		

==== Loans out ====
Date	Pos.	Player	Age	Moving to	Fee	Notes	Source
13 July 2019	MF	(Ghana) Emmanuel Agyemang-Badu	28	(Italy) Hellas Verona	Loan		
27 August 2019	DF	(Italy) Giuseppe Pezzella	21	(Italy) Parma	Loan	Loan with an obligation to buy for €4.5M	
28 January 2020	DF	(Ghana) Nicholas Opoku	22	(France) Amiens	Loan	Loan with an option to buy	
29 January 2020	MF	(Czech Republic) Antonín Barák	25	(Italy) Lecce	Loan		

== Pre-season and friendlies ==
20 July 2019 Friendly	Udinese (Italy)	1–2	(Italy) Ravenna	Tarcento, Italy
17:00 CEST (UTC+2)	Lasagna 9'	Report	Fyda 36'; Sapucci 70'	Stadium: Campo Sportivo di Tarcento; Attendance: 1,400; Referee: Carlo Rinaldi

27 July 2019 Friendly	Borussia Dortmund (Germany)	4–1	(Italy) Udinese	Altach, Austria
17:15 CEST (UTC+2)	Hazard 6'; Götze 19' (pen.); Weigl 28'; Brandt 44'; Reus (yellow card) 83'	Report	Mandragora 76'; De Maio (yellow card) 82'	Stadium: Stadion Schnabelholz; Referee: Robert Schörgenhofer (Austria)

2 August 2019 Friendly	Beşiktaş (Turkey)	0–2	(Italy) Udinese	Grödig, Austria
19:00 CEST (UTC+2)	B. Yılmaz (yellow card) 45+1'; R. Yılmaz (yellow card) 75'	Report	Lasagna 47'; Pussetto 53'; Mandragora (yellow card) 69'	Stadium: Untersberg-Arena; Referee: Sergej Provci (Austria)

12 August 2019 Friendly	Udinese (Italy)	9–2	(Italy) San Luigi	Casarsa della Delizia, Italy
18:00 CEST (UTC+2)	Teodorczyk 12', 16', 69'; Mandragora 28', 42'; Nestorovski 30', 34'; Oviszach 84'; Barák 86'	Report	Disnan 8'; Lombardi 71'	Stadium: Campo Sportivo; Referee: Piero Marangone

6 September 2019 Friendly	Udinese (Italy)	2–0	(Italy) Pordenone	Udine, Italy
18:00 CEST (UTC+2)	Teodorczyk 28' (pen.); Pussetto 49'	Report		Stadium: Stadio Friuli

12 October 2019 Friendly	Udinese (Italy)	1–1	(Italy) Venezia	Udine, Italy
15:00 CEST (UTC+2)	Lasagna 31'	Report	Capello 83'	Stadium: Stadio Friuli; Referee: Daniele Minelli

16 November 2019 Friendly	Udinese (Italy)	2–1	(Latvia) Spartaks Jūrmala	Udine, Italy
14:30 CET (UTC+1)	Ballarini 36'; Nuytinck 54'	Report	Nwaorisa 61'	Stadium: Stadio Friuli; Referee: Riccardo Ros

17 June 2020 Friendly	Udinese (Italy)	2–0	(Italy) Brescia	Udine, Italy
18:30 CEST (UTC+2)	Teodorczyk 5'; Samir 82'	Report		Stadium: Stadio Friuli; Referee: Giovanni Ayroldi

== Competitions ==
=== Serie A ===
==== League table ====
Pos	Team	Pld	W	D	L	GF	GA	GD	Pts
11	Parma	38	14	7	17	56	57	−1	49 (Note: Positions determined by head-to-head points: Hellas Verona: 10 pts; Fiorentina: 5 pts; Parma: 1 pt.)
12	Bologna	38	12	11	15	52	65	−13	47
13	Udinese	38	12	9	17	37	51	−14	45 (Note: Udinese finished ahead of Cagliari on head-to-head points: Udinese 2–1 Cagliari, Cagliari 0–1 Udinese.)
14	Cagliari	38	11	12	15	52	56	−4	45
15	Sampdoria	38	12	6	20	48	65	−17	42

Source: Serie A, Soccerway
Rules for classification: 1) Points; 2) Head-to-head points; 3) Head-to-head goal difference; 4) Goal difference; 5) Goals scored; 6) Draw. (Note: Head-to-head record is used only after all the matches between the teams in question have been played)

==== Results summary ====
Overall								Home						Away					
Pld	W	D	L	GF	GA	GD	Pts	W	D	L	GF	GA	GD	W	D	L	GF	GA	GD
38	12	9	17	37	51	−14	45	6	6	7	18	23	−5	6	3	10	19	28	−9

Last updated: 2 August 2020.
Source: Competitive matches

==== Results by round ====
Round	1	2	3	4	5	6	7	8	9	10	11	12	13	14	15	16	17	18	19	20	21	22	23	24	25	26	27	28	29	30	31	32	33	34	35	36	37	38
Ground	H	H	A	H	A	H	A	H	A	H	A	H	A	A	H	A	H	A	H	A	A	H	A	H	A	H	A	H	A	H	A	H	H	A	H	A	H	A
Result	W	L	L	L	D	W	L	W	L	L	W	D	L	L	D	L	W	W	W	L	L	L	D	D	D	D	L	L	W	D	W	L	D	L	W	W	L	W
Position	8	14	17	16	18	14	14	12	13	14	12	11	13	16	16	17	14	13	12	14	14	15	15	15	15	14	15	15	14	15	14	15	16	16	15	13	14	13

Updated to match(es) played on 2 August 2020. Source: Competitive matches
A = Away; H = Home; W = Win; D = Draw; L = Loss

==== Matches ====
25 August 2019 1	Udinese	1–0	Milan	Udine
18:00 CEST (UTC+02:00)	Jajalo (yellow card) 45+5'; Becão 72'	Report	Paquetá (yellow card) 22'; Çalhanoğlu (yellow card) 34'; Borini (yellow card) 44'	Stadium: Dacia Arena; Attendance: 24,584; Referee: Fabrizio Pasqua

1 September 2019 2	Udinese	1–3	Parma	Udine
20:45 CEST (UTC+02:00)	Lasagna 17'; Teodorczyk (yellow card) 90+3'	Report	Grassi (yellow card) 6'; Gervinho 43'; Gagliolo 59'; Inglese 75'; Barillà (yellow card) 81'; Hernani (yellow card) 86'	Stadium: Dacia Arena; Attendance: 20,410; Referee: Marco Piccinini

14 September 2019 3	Internazionale	1–0	Udinese	Milan
20:45 CEST (UTC+02:00)	Barella (yellow card) 29'; Sensi 44'; Candreva (yellow card) 78'	Report	De Paul (red card) 35'; Becão (yellow card) 36'	Stadium: San Siro; Attendance: 57,991; Referee: Maurizio Mariani

21 September 2019 4	Udinese	0–1	Brescia	Udine
15:00 CEST (UTC+02:00)	Jajalo (yellow card) 21'; Becão (yellow card) 45+2'; Pussetto (yellow card) 57'; Okaka (yellow card) 82'	Report	Matějů (yellow card) 11'; Bisoli (yellow card) 15'; Rômulo 57'; Chancellor (yellow card) 61'; Ayé (yellow card) 85'	Stadium: Dacia Arena; Attendance: 19,611; Referee: Paolo Valeri

24 September 2019 5	Hellas Verona	0–0	Udinese	Verona
19:00 CEST (UTC+02:00)		Report	Stryger Larsen (yellow card) 42'; Jajalo (yellow card) 60'; Walace (yellow card) 82'; Becão (yellow card) 90+1'	Stadium: Stadio Marc'Antonio Bentegodi; Attendance: 13,740; Referee: Daniele Chiffi

29 September 2019 6	Udinese	1–0	Bologna	Udine
15:00 CEST (UTC+02:00)	Samir (yellow card) 16'; Okaka 27', (yellow card) 41'; Troost-Ekong (yellow card) 77'; Nestorovski (yellow card) 85'	Report	Soriano (yellow card) 55' (red card) 90+6'; Bani (yellow card) 75'; Skorupski (yellow card) 85'	Stadium: Dacia Arena; Attendance: 21,361; Referee: Antonio Giua

6 October 2019 7	Fiorentina	1–0	Udinese	Florence
12:30 CEST (UTC+02:00)	Castrovilli (yellow card) 39'; Milenković 72'	Report	Samir (yellow card) 55'; Opoku (yellow card) 74'	Stadium: Stadio Artemio Franchi; Attendance: 37,963; Referee: Alessandro Prontera

20 October 2019 8	Udinese	1–0	Torino	Udine
15:00 CEST (UTC+02:00)	Jajalo (yellow card) 40'; Okaka 42', (yellow card) 80'; Becão (yellow card) 74'	Report	Lukić (yellow card) 26'; Laxalt (yellow card) 55'; Izzo (yellow card) 57'	Stadium: Dacia Arena; Attendance: 24,049; Referee: Rosario Abisso

27 October 2019 9	Atalanta	7–1	Udinese	Bergamo
15:00 CET (UTC+01:00)	Iličić 21', 43'; Djimsiti (yellow card) 26'; Muriel 35' (pen.), 48', 75' (pen.); Pašalić 52'; Amad 83'; Hateboer (yellow card) 88'	Report	Opoku (yellow card) 7' (yellow-red card) 32'; Okaka 12'; Samir (yellow card) 74'	Stadium: Gewiss Stadium; Attendance: 18,677; Referee: Fabio Maresca

30 October 2019 10	Udinese	0–4	Roma	Udine
21:00 CET (UTC+01:00)	Okaka (yellow card) 35'; Jajalo (yellow card) 47'; Barák (yellow card) 50'; De Paul (yellow card) 68'	Report	Mancini (yellow card) 3'; Zaniolo 14'; Fazio (red card) 32'; Džeko (yellow card) 33'; Smalling 51'; Kluivert 54'; Kolarov 66' (pen.)	Stadium: Dacia Arena; Attendance: 23,854; Referee: Massimiliano Irrati

3 November 2019 11	Genoa	1–3	Udinese	Genoa
15:00 CET (UTC+01:00)	Pandev 22'	Report	Sema (yellow card) 25', (goal) 87'; De Paul 32'; Nuytinck (yellow card) 48'; Lasagna 90+4'	Stadium: Stadio Luigi Ferraris; Attendance: 20,030; Referee: Fabrizio Pasqua

10 November 2019 12	Udinese	0–0	SPAL	Udine
15:00 CET (UTC+01:00)	Nestorovski (yellow card) 26'; Becão (yellow card) 47'; Okaka (yellow card) 53'	Report	Reca (yellow card) 44'; Floccari (yellow card) 46'; Felipe (yellow card) 70'; Tomović (yellow card) 80'; Cionek (yellow card) 83'	Stadium: Dacia Arena; Attendance: 21,621; Referee: Davide Massa

24 November 2019 13	Sampdoria	2–1	Udinese	Genoa
18:00 CET (UTC+01:00)	Gabbiadini 45+6'; Ramírez 75' (pen.), (yellow card) 76'; Jankto (yellow card) 88'	Report	Nestorovski 29', (yellow card) 41'; Jajalo (yellow card) 39' (yellow-red card) 51'	Stadium: Stadio Luigi Ferraris; Attendance: 17,031; Referee: Luca Pairetto

1 December 2019 14	Lazio	3–0	Udinese	Rome
15:00 CET (UTC+01:00)	Immobile 9', 36' (pen.); Luis Alberto 45+1' (pen.)	Report	Troost-Ekong (yellow card) 36'	Stadium: Stadio Olimpico; Attendance: 20,000; Referee: Marco Di Bello

7 December 2019 15	Udinese	1–1	Napoli	Udine
18:00 CET (UTC+01:00)	Lasagna 32'; De Paul (yellow card) 34'; Fofana (yellow card) 60'; Okaka (yellow card) 82'	Report	Mertens (yellow card) 35'; Callejón (yellow card) 36'; Zieliński 69'; Maksimović (red card) 80'; Mário Rui (yellow card) 90+1'	Stadium: Dacia Arena; Attendance: 20,405; Referee: Maurizio Mariani

15 December 2019 16	Juventus	3–1	Udinese	Turin
15:00 CET (UTC+01:00)	Ronaldo 9', 37'; Dybala (yellow card) 22'; Bonucci 45'; Bentancur (yellow card) 90+5'	Report	Nuytinck (yellow card) 40'; Pussetto 90+4'	Stadium: Allianz Stadium; Attendance: 39,127; Referee: Fabrizio Pasqua

21 December 2019 17	Udinese	2–1	Cagliari	Udine
15:00 CET (UTC+01:00)	De Paul 39'; Mandragora (yellow card) 63'; De Maio (yellow card) 69'; Fofana 85'; Okaka (yellow card) 89'	Report	Pisacane (yellow card) 30' (yellow-red card) 90+2'; Rog (yellow card) 54'; João Pedro 84'; Klavan (yellow card) 90+8'	Stadium: Dacia Arena; Attendance: 19,822; Referee: Marco Piccinini

6 January 2020 18	Lecce	0–1	Udinese	Lecce
18:00 CET (UTC+01:00)	Gabriel (yellow card) 89'	Report	De Paul 88', (yellow card) 89'	Stadium: Stadio Via del Mare; Attendance: 21,321; Referee: Antonio Giua

12 January 2020 19	Udinese	3–0	Sassuolo	Udine
12:30 CET (UTC+01:00)	Okaka 14'; Sema 68'; De Paul 90+1'	Report		Stadium: Dacia Arena; Attendance: 21,731; Referee: Manuel Volpi

19 January 2020 20	Milan	3–2	Udinese	Milan
12:30 CET (UTC+01:00)	Bennacer (yellow card) 40'; Rebić 48', 90+3'; Conti (yellow card) 63'; Hernandez 71'; Ibrahimović (yellow card) 80'; Castillejo (yellow card) 90+4'	Report	Stryger Larsen 6'; Sema (yellow card) 27'; Lasagna 85'	Stadium: San Siro; Attendance: 56,107; Referee: Luca Pairetto

26 January 2020 21	Parma	2–0	Udinese	Parma
15:00 CET (UTC+01:00)	Gagliolo 19'; Kulusevski 34'; Hernani (yellow card) 59'; Laurini (yellow card) 68'	Report	Troost-Ekong (yellow card) 30'; Mandragora (yellow card) 45'; Becão (yellow card) 49'	Stadium: Stadio Ennio Tardini; Attendance: 14,250; Referee: Simone Sozza

2 February 2020 22	Udinese	0–2	Internazionale	Udine
20:45 CET (UTC+01:00)	Stryger Larsen (yellow card) 17'; Lasagna (yellow card) 87'	Report	Barella (yellow card) 11'; Bastoni (yellow card) 49'; Lukaku 64', 71' (pen.)	Stadium: Dacia Arena; Attendance: 23,215; Referee: Marco Di Bello

9 February 2020 23	Brescia	1–1	Udinese	Brescia
15:00 CET (UTC+01:00)	Bisoli 81'	Report	Jajalo (yellow card) 7'; Sema (yellow card) 52'; Fofana (yellow card) 69'; De Paul 90+3'	Stadium: Stadio Mario Rigamonti; Attendance: 13,586; Referee: Marco Piccinini

16 February 2020 24	Udinese	0–0	Hellas Verona	Udine
12:30 CET (UTC+01:00)	Troost-Ekong (yellow card) 77'	Report	Veloso (yellow card) 56'; Lazović (yellow card) 59'	Stadium: Dacia Arena; Attendance: 22,308; Referee: Eugenio Abbattista

22 February 2020 25	Bologna	1–1	Udinese	Bologna
15:00 CET (UTC+01:00)	Mbaye (yellow card) 51'; Palacio 90+1'	Report	Okaka 33', (yellow card) 84'; De Paul (yellow card) 51'	Stadium: Stadio Renato Dall'Ara; Attendance: 21,523; Referee: Fabrizio Pasqua

8 March 2020 26	Udinese	0–0	Fiorentina	Udine
18:00 CET (UTC+01:00)	Nestorovski (yellow card) 18'; Sema (yellow card) 77'	Report		Stadium: Dacia Arena; Attendance: 0 Referee: Michael Fabbri
Note: Match was initially postponed to 13 May from its original date of 1 March due to concerns over the COVID-19 pandemic, but was later moved to 8 March to be played behind closed doors.

23 June 2020 27	Torino	1–0	Udinese	Turin
21:45 CEST (UTC+02:00)	Belotti 16'; Meïté (yellow card) 18'; Edera (yellow card) 39'	Report	Fofana (yellow card) 64'; De Paul (yellow card) 85'	Stadium: Stadio Olimpico Grande Torino; Attendance: 0 Referee: Fabio Maresca
Note: Match was postponed to 14 March, then to 23 June, from its original date of 9 March due to schedule shuffling to allow for Udinese vs Fiorentina to be played following its previous postponement due to concerns over the COVID-19 pandemic. All subsequent matches were also shuffled to allow for this accommodation. On 9 March, all sports events in Italy were suspended until 3 April. This was the first match played since the COVID-19 pandemic lockdown in Italy.

28 June 2020 28	Udinese	2–3	Atalanta	Udine
19:30 CEST (UTC+02:00)	Lasagna 31', 87'; Becão (yellow card) 70'; Zeegelaar (yellow card) 77'	Report	Zapata 9'; Malinovskyi (yellow card) 40'; Muriel 71', 79'; Caldara (yellow card) 76'	Stadium: Dacia Arena; Attendance: 0 Referee: Marco Di Bello

2 July 2020 29	Roma	0–2	Udinese	Rome
21:45 CEST (UTC+02:00)	Perotti (red card) 29'; Mkhitaryan (yellow card) 45+2'; Villar (yellow card) 68'; Ibañez (yellow card) 89'	Report	Zeegelaar (yellow card) 11'; Lasagna 12'; Okaka (yellow card) 45+2'; Nestorovski 78'	Stadium: Stadio Olimpico; Attendance: 0 Referee: Marco Guida

5 July 2020 30	Udinese	2–2	Genoa	Udine
19:30 CEST (UTC+02:00)	Sema (yellow card) 10'; Stryger Larsen (yellow card) 25'; Fofana 44', (yellow card) 82'; Lasagna 73'	Report	Goldaniga (yellow card) 42'; Sturaro (yellow card) 63'; Pandev 81'; Pinamonti 90+7'	Stadium: Dacia Arena; Attendance: 0 Referee: Daniele Orsato

9 July 2020 31	SPAL	0–3	Udinese	Ferrara
19:30 CEST (UTC+02:00)		Report	De Paul 18'; Okaka 35'; Lasagna 82'	Stadium: Stadio Paolo Mazza; Attendance: 0 Referee: Daniele Chiffi

12 July 2020 32	Udinese	1–3	Sampdoria	Udine
19:30 CEST (UTC+02:00)	Lasagna 37'; Ter Avest (yellow card) 74'	Report	Ekdal (yellow card) 25'; Audero (yellow card) 38'; Quagliarella 45+1'; Thorsby (yellow card) 69'; Bonazzoli 84'; Augello (yellow card) 86'; Gabbiadini 90+4'	Stadium: Dacia Arena; Attendance: 0 Referee: Paolo Valeri

15 July 2020 33	Udinese	0–0	Lazio	Udine
21:45 CEST (UTC+02:00)	Okaka (yellow card) 3'; Stryger Larsen (yellow card) 45+1'	Report	Caicedo (yellow card) 16'; Luiz Felipe (yellow card) 39'; Luis Alberto (yellow card) 84'	Stadium: Dacia Arena; Attendance: 0 Referee: Rosario Abisso

19 July 2020 34	Napoli	2–1	Udinese	Naples
19:30 CEST (UTC+02:00)	Milik 31', (yellow card) 38'; Koulibaly (yellow card) 78'; Demme (yellow card) 90+3'; Politano 90+5'	Report	Becão (yellow card) 14'; De Paul 22'; Walace (yellow card) 88'	Stadium: Stadio San Paolo; Attendance: 0 Referee: Daniele Chiffi

23 July 2020 35	Udinese	2–1	Juventus	Udine
19:30 CEST (UTC+02:00)	Troost-Ekong (yellow card) 20'; Nestorovski 52'; Zeegelaar (yellow card) 68'; Fofana 90+2'	Report	Ramsey (yellow card) 1'; De Ligt 42'; Cuadrado (yellow card) 83'	Stadium: Dacia Arena; Attendance: 0 Referee: Massimiliano Irrati

26 July 2020 36	Cagliari	0–1	Udinese	Cagliari
19:30 CEST (UTC+02:00)	Ioniță (yellow card) 75'; Nández (yellow card) 89'	Report	Okaka 3'; Stryger Larsen (yellow card) 21'	Stadium: Sardegna Arena; Attendance: 0 Referee: Fabrizio Pasqua

29 July 2020 37	Udinese	1–2	Lecce	Udine
19:30 CEST (UTC+02:00)	Samir 36'; Sema (yellow card) 86'	Report	Paz (yellow card) 22'; Mancosu 40' (pen.); Calderoni (yellow card) 45+1'; Lapadula 81', (yellow card) 82'; Donati (yellow card) 90+3'	Stadium: Dacia Arena; Attendance: 0 Referee: Daniele Orsato

2 August 2020 38	Sassuolo	0–1	Udinese	Reggio Emilia
20:45 CEST (UTC+02:00)	Peluso (yellow card) 11'	Report	Okaka 53'; Musso (yellow card) 90+6'	Stadium: Mapei Stadium – Città del Tricolore; Attendance: 0 Referee: Daniel Amabile

=== Coppa Italia ===
18 August 2019 Third round	Udinese	3–1	Südtirol	Udine
20:30 CEST (UTC+02:00)	Lasagna 49'; Mandragora 70', 88'		Morosini 66'	Stadium: Dacia Arena; Attendance: 5,252; Referee: Gianluca Aureliano

4 December 2019 Fourth round	Udinese	4–0	Bologna	Udine
21:00 CET (UTC+01:00)	Barák 24'; De Maio 42', (yellow card) 53'; Sierralta (yellow card) 45'; Mandragora 77'; Lasagna 90+2'; Stryger Larsen (yellow card) 90+3'	Report	Corbo (yellow card) 41'; Schouten (yellow card) 66'; Da Costa (yellow card) 90+2'; Juwara (yellow card) 90+3'	Stadium: Dacia Arena; Attendance: 3,066; Referee: Marco Piccinini

15 January 2020 Round of 16	Juventus	4–0	Udinese	Turin
20:45 CET (UTC+01:00)	Higuaín 16'; Dybala 26' (pen.), 58'; Douglas Costa 61' (pen.)	Report	Nuytinck (yellow card) 60'	Stadium: Allianz Stadium; Attendance: 39,524; Referee: Gianluca Aureliano

== Statistics ==
=== Appearances and goals ===
No.	Pos	Nat	Player	Total		Serie A		Coppa Italia	
No.	Pos	Nat	Player	Apps	Goals	Apps	Goals	Apps	Goals
Goalkeepers
1	GK	(Argentina) ARG	Juan Musso	39	0	38	0	1	0
27	GK	(Italy) ITA	Samuele Perisan	0	0	0	0	0	0
88	GK	(Brazil) BRA	Nícolas	2	0	0	0	2	0
Defenders
3	DF	(Brazil) BRA	Samir	22	1	16+5	1	1	0
5	DF	(Nigeria) NGA	William Troost-Ekong	31	0	29+1	0	1	0
17	DF	(Netherlands) NED	Bram Nuytinck	28	0	26	0	2	0
18	DF	(Netherlands) NED	Hidde ter Avest	22	0	6+14	0	2	0
19	DF	(Denmark) DEN	Jens Stryger Larsen	36	1	32+1	1	1+2	0
50	DF	(Brazil) BRA	Rodrigo Becão	30	1	24+5	1	0+1	0
77	DF	(Netherlands) NED	Marvin Zeegelaar	13	0	6+7	0	0	0
87	DF	(France) FRA	Sebastian De Maio	23	1	17+4	0	2	1
—	DF	(Austria) AUT	Sebastian Prödl	0	0	0	0	0	0
Midfielders
6	MF	(Ivory Coast) CIV	Seko Fofana	35	3	24+8	3	2+1	0
8	MF	(Bosnia and Herzegovina) BIH	Mato Jajalo	28	0	19+7	0	2	0
11	MF	(Brazil) BRA	Walace	22	0	12+8	0	1+1	0
12	MF	(Sweden) SWE	Ken Sema	33	2	30+2	2	1	0
38	MF	(Italy) ITA	Rolando Mandragora	28	3	24+2	0	2	3
61	MF	(Italy) ITA	Marco Ballarini	1	0	0+1	0	0	0
64	MF	(Norway) NOR	Martin Palumbo	1	0	0+1	0	0	0
Forwards
7	FW	(Italy) ITA	Stefano Okaka	33	8	28+5	8	0	0
10	FW	(Argentina) ARG	Rodrigo De Paul	35	8	33+1	8	1	0
15	FW	(Italy) ITA	Kevin Lasagna	39	12	28+8	10	2+1	2
30	FW	(North Macedonia) MKD	Ilija Nestorovski	30	3	15+13	3	1+1	0
91	FW	(Poland) POL	Łukasz Teodorczyk	16	0	1+13	0	2	0
Players transferred out during the season
2	DF	(Chile) CHI	Francisco Sierralta	1	0	0	0	1	0
4	DF	(Ghana) GHA	Nicholas Opoku	10	0	6+1	0	3	0
23	FW	(Argentina) ARG	Ignacio Pussetto	14	1	2+10	1	1+1	0
72	MF	(Czech Republic) CZE	Antonín Barák	11	1	1+7	0	2+1	1
97	DF	(Italy) ITA	Giuseppe Pezzella	1	0	1	0	0	0

Last updated: 2 August 2020
Source: Competitions

=== Goalscorers ===
Rank	No.	Pos	Nat	Name	Serie A	Coppa Italia	Total
1	15	FW	(Italy)	Kevin Lasagna	4	2	6
2	10	FW	(Argentina)	Rodrigo De Paul	5	0	5
3	7	FW	(Italy)	Stefano Okaka	4	0	4
4	38	MF	(Italy)	Rolando Mandragora	0	3	3
5	12	MF	(Sweden)	Ken Sema	2	0	2
6	6	MF	(Ivory Coast)	Seko Fofana	1	0	1
6	19	DF	(Denmark)	Jens Stryger Larsen	1	0	1
6	23	FW	(Argentina)	Ignacio Pussetto	1	0	1
6	30	FW	(North Macedonia)	Ilija Nestorovski	1	0	1
6	50	DF	(Brazil)	Rodrigo Becão	1	0	1
6	72	MF	(Czech Republic)	Antonín Barák	0	1	1
6	87	DF	(France)	Sebastian De Maio	0	1	1
Own goal					0	0	0
Totals					20	7	27

Last updated: 9 February 2020

=== Clean sheets ===
Rank	No.	Pos	Nat	Name	Serie A	Coppa Italia	Total
1	1	GK	(Argentina)	Juan Musso	7	0	7
Totals					7	0	7

Last updated: 9 February 2020

=== Disciplinary record ===
No.	Pos	Nat	Name	Serie A			Coppa Italia			Total		
No.	Pos	Nat	Name	Booked	(yellow card) (yellow-red card)	Sent off (straight red)	Booked	(yellow card) (yellow-red card)	Sent off (straight red)	Booked	(yellow card) (yellow-red card)	Sent off (straight red)
2	DF	(Chile)	Francisco Sierralta	0	0	0	1	0	0	1	0	0
3	DF	(Brazil)	Samir	3	0	0	0	0	0	3	0	0
4	DF	(Ghana)	Nicholas Opoku	1	1	0	0	0	0	1	1	0
5	DF	(Nigeria)	William Troost-Ekong	3	0	0	0	0	0	3	0	0
17	DF	(Netherlands)	Bram Nuytinck	2	0	0	1	0	0	3	0	0
19	DF	(Denmark)	Jens Stryger Larsen	2	0	0	1	0	0	3	0	0
50	DF	(Brazil)	Rodrigo Becão	6	0	0	0	0	0	6	0	0
87	DF	(France)	Sebastian De Maio	1	0	0	1	0	0	2	0	0
6	MF	(Ivory Coast)	Seko Fofana	2	0	0	0	0	0	2	0	0
8	MF	(Bosnia and Herzegovina)	Mato Jajalo	6	1	0	0	0	0	6	1	0
11	MF	(Brazil)	Walace	1	0	0	0	0	0	1	0	0
12	MF	(Sweden)	Ken Sema	3	0	0	0	0	0	3	0	0
38	MF	(Italy)	Rolando Mandragora	2	0	0	0	0	0	2	0	0
72	MF	(Czech Republic)	Antonín Barák	1	0	0	0	0	0	1	0	0
7	FW	(Italy)	Stefano Okaka	7	0	0	0	0	0	7	0	0
10	FW	(Argentina)	Rodrigo De Paul	3	0	1	0	0	0	3	0	1
15	FW	(Italy)	Kevin Lasagna	1	0	0	0	0	0	1	0	0
23	FW	(Argentina)	Ignacio Pussetto	1	0	0	0	0	0	1	0	0
30	FW	(North Macedonia)	Ilija Nestorovski	3	0	0	0	0	0	3	0	0
91	FW	(Poland)	Łukasz Teodorczyk	1	0	0	0	0	0	1	0	0
Totals				46	1	1	4	0	0	50	1	1

Last updated: 9 February 2020
