= 2017–18 Udinese Calcio season =

Udinese
2017–18 season
- President: Franco Soldati
- Manager: Luigi Delneri (until 21 November 2017); Massimo Oddo (from 21 November 2017 to 24 April 2018); Igor Tudor (from 24 April 2018)
- Stadium: Dacia Arena
- Serie A: 14th
- Coppa Italia: Round of 16
- Top goalscorer: League: Kevin Lasagna (12); All: Kevin Lasagna (14)
- Highest home attendance: 24,015 vs Bologna (20 May 2018, Serie A)
- Lowest home attendance: 3,066 vs Perugia (30 November 2017, Coppa Italia)
- Average home league attendance: 17,906
Home colours	Away colours	Third colours

The 2017–18 season was Udinese Calcio's 38th season in Serie A and their 23rd consecutive season in the top-flight. The club competed in Serie A and the Coppa Italia.

Following a 4–0–8 start to the season, coach Luigi Delneri was replaced by 2006 FIFA World Cup winner and former Lazio and Milan player Massimo Oddo. Following an upturn in form which saw the club win all five league games in December, Udinese's season dipped severely, with a club record run of eleven consecutive Serie A defeats, from 11 February to 22 April 2018. As a result, Oddo was sacked and replaced by former Juventus player Igor Tudor on 24 April. The club finished the season in 14th place; they were eliminated in the Coppa Italia in the round of 16 by Napoli.

Kevin Lasagna finished the season as the club's top scorer, with 12 goals in Serie A and two in the Coppa Italia.

== Players ==
=== Squad information ===
Last updated on 20 May 2018
Appearances include league matches only

No.	Name	Nat	Position(s)	Date of birth (Age at end of season)	Signed from	Signed in	Contract ends	Apps.	Goals
Goalkeepers
1	Albano Bizzarri	(Argentina)	GK	9 November 1977 (aged 40)	(Italy) Pescara	2017	2018	32	0
22	Simone Scuffet	(Italy)	GK	31 May 1996 (aged 22)	(Italy) Youth Sector	2013	2022	30	0
25	Davide Borsellini	(Italy)	GK	4 January 1999 (aged 19)	(Italy) Paganese	2017		0	0
Defenders
3	Samir	(Brazil)	CB	5 December 1994 (aged 23)	(Brazil) Flamengo	2016	2021	52	2
4	Gabriele Angella	(Italy)	CB	28 April 1989 (aged 29)	(England) Watford	2016	2020	26	1
5	Danilo	(Brazil)	CB	10 May 1984 (aged 34)	(Brazil) Palmeiras	2011	2020	244	9
11	Francesco Zampano	(Italy)	LB / RB	30 September 1993 (aged 24)	(Italy) Pescara	2018	2018	6	0
12	Igor Bubnjić	(Croatia)	CB	17 July 1992 (aged 25)	(Croatia) Slaven Belupo	2013	2018	13	0
17	Bram Nuytinck	(Netherlands)	CB	4 May 1990 (aged 28)	(Belgium) Anderlecht	2017	2021	27	1
19	Jens Stryger Larsen	(Denmark)	RB	21 February 1991 (aged 27)	Austria Wien	2017	2021	30	1
27	Silvan Widmer	(Switzerland)	RB	5 March 1993 (aged 25)	(Switzerland) Aarau	2013	2020	131	5
53	Ali Adnan Kadhim	(Iraq)	LB	19 December 1993 (aged 24)	(Turkey) Çaykur Rizespor	2015	2020	66	2
97	Giuseppe Pezzella	(Italy)	LB	29 November 1997 (aged 20)	(Italy) Palermo	2017	2022	15	0
Midfielders
6	Seko Fofana	(Ivory Coast)	CM / DM / AM	7 May 1995 (aged 23)	(England) Manchester City	2016	2022	49	8
13	Svante Ingelsson	(Sweden)	RM / LM / LW	14 June 1998 (aged 20)	(Sweden) Kalmar FF	2017	2021	7	1
14	Jakub Jankto	(Czech Republic)	CM / LM	19 January 1996 (aged 22)	(Czech Republic) Slavia Prague	2014	2021	65	9
21	Simone Pontisso	(Italy)	DM	20 March 1997 (aged 21)	(Italy) Youth Sector	2016	2022	2	0
23	Emil Hallfreðsson	(Iceland)	CM / LM / DM	29 June 1984 (aged 34)	(Italy) Hellas Verona	2016	2020	58	0
72	Antonín Barák	(Czech Republic)	AM / DM / CM	3 December 1994 (aged 23)	(Czech Republic) Slavia Prague	2017	2022	34	7
85	Valon Behrami	(Switzerland)	DM / RM / CM	19 April 1985 (aged 33)	(England) Watford	2017	2019	20	1
99	Andrija Balić	(Croatia)	CM / AM / DM	11 August 1997 (aged 20)	(Croatia) Hajduk Split	2016	2020	25	1
Forwards
10	Rodrigo De Paul	(Argentina)	RW / LW / AM	24 May 1994 (aged 24)	(Spain) Valencia	2016	2021	71	8
15	Kevin Lasagna	(Italy)	CF / SS / LW	10 August 1992 (aged 25)	(Italy) Carpi	2017	2020	29	12
18	Stipe Perica	(Croatia)	CF / ST	7 July 1995 (aged 22)	(England) Chelsea	2016	2022	69	10
20	Maxi López	(Argentina)	CF / ST	3 April 1984 (aged 34)	(Italy) Torino	2017	2018	28	2
Players transferred during the season
2	Molla Wagué	(Mali)	CB	21 February 1991 (aged 27)	(Spain) Granada	2017	2017	1	0
7	Ryder Matos	(Brazil)	SS / RW / LW	27 February 1993 (aged 25)	(Italy) Fiorentina	2016	2020	35	0
9	Riad Bajić	(Bosnia and Herzegovina)	CF / LW / SS	6 May 1994 (aged 24)	(Turkey) Konyaspor	2017	2020	5	0
55	Paweł Bochniewicz	(Poland)	CB	30 January 1996 (aged 22)	(Italy) Reggina	2014	2019	0	0
77	Cyril Théréau	(France)	CF / ST	24 April 1983 (aged 35)	(Italy) Chievo	2014	2017	108	35
96	Ewandro	(Brazil)	RW / SS / LW	15 March 1996 (aged 22)	(Brazil) São Paulo	2016	2021	5	0

== Transfers ==
=== In ===
Date	Pos.	Player	Age	Moving from	Fee	Notes	Source
2 June 2017	FW	(Mali) Aly Mallé	19	(Spain) Granada	Undisclosed		
24 June 2017	GK	(Argentina) Albano Bizzarri	39	(Italy) Pescara	Free		
30 June 2017	DF	(Italy) Giuseppe Pezzella	19	(Italy) Palermo	Undisclosed		
1 July 2017	MF	(Sweden) Svante Ingelsson	19	(Sweden) Kalmar FF	Undisclosed		
10 July 2017	MF	(Senegal) Mamadou Coulibaly	18	(Italy) Pescara	Undisclosed	Player will stay on loan with Pescara until 30 June 2018	
29 July 2017	DF	(Netherlands) Bram Nuytinck	27	(Belgium) Anderlecht	€3M		
4 August 2017	FW	(Bosnia and Herzegovina) Riad Bajić	23	(Turkey) Konyaspor	€5.5M		
16 August 2017	MF	(Switzerland) Valon Behrami	32	(England) Watford	Undisclosed		
24 August 2017	DF	(Denmark) Jens Stryger Larsen	26	Austria Wien	Undisclosed		
31 August 2017	FW	(Argentina) Maxi López	33	(Italy) Torino	Undisclosed		

==== Loans in ====
Date	Pos.	Player	Age	Moving from	Fee	Notes	Source
26 January 2018	DF	(Italy) Francesco Zampano	24	(Italy) Pescara	Loan		

=== Out ===
Date	Pos.	Player	Age	Moving to	Fee	Notes	Source
15 June 2017	MF	(Brazil) Guilherme	26	(Spain) Deportivo La Coruña	Undisclosed	Bought out loan	
1 July 2017	FW	(Colombia) Duván Zapata	26	(Italy) Napoli	Loan return		
3 July 2017	DF	(Brazil) Felipe	32	(Italy) SPAL	Undisclosed		
8 July 2017	DF	(Italy) Davide Faraoni	25	Unattached		Contract terminated by mutual consent	
9 August 2017	DF	(Brazil) Gabriel Silva	26	(France) Saint-Étienne	Undisclosed		
31 August 2017	FW	(France) Cyril Théréau	34	(Italy) Fiorentina	€2M		

==== Loans out ====
Date	Pos.	Player	Age	Moving to	Fee	Notes	Source
28 June 2017	MF	(Brazil) Lucas Evangelista	22	(Portugal) Estoril	Loan		
9 July 2017	MF	(Australia) Panos Armenakas	18	(Belgium) Tubize	Loan		
12 July 2017	DF	(France) Thomas Heurtaux	29	(Italy) Hellas Verona	Loan	Loan with an option to buy	
1 August 2017	MF	(Ghana) Emmanuel Agyemang-Badu	26	(Turkey) Bursaspor	Loan		
1 August 2017	GK	(Italy) Alex Meret	20	(Italy) SPAL	Loan	Second consecutive loan	
11 August 2017	DF	(Chile) Francisco Sierralta	20	(Italy) Parma	Loan		
31 August 2017	MF	(Greece) Panagiotis Kone	30	(Greece) AEK Athens	Loan		
31 August 2017	GK	(Greece) Orestis Karnezis	32	(England) Watford	Loan		
31 August 2017	DF	(Mali) Molla Wagué	26	(England) Watford	Loan		
6 January 2018	FW	(Mali) Aly Mallé	19	(Spain) Lorca	Loan		
8 January 2018	MF	(Sweden) Melker Hallberg	22	(Sweden) Kalmar FF	Loan		
9 January 2018	GK	(Italy) Samuele Perisan	20	(Italy) Arezzo	Loan		
11 January 2018	FW	(Brazil) Ryder Matos	24	(Italy) Hellas Verona	Loan		
18 January 2018	DF	(Poland) Paweł Bochniewicz	21	(Poland) Górnik Zabrze	Loan		
20 January 2018	FW	(Bosnia and Herzegovina) Riad Bajić	23	(Turkey) İstanbul Başakşehir	Loan		
24 January 2018	FW	(Brazil) Ewandro	21	(Portugal) Estoril	Loan		

== Pre-season and friendlies ==
v

== Competitions ==
=== Serie A ===
==== League table ====
Pos	Team	Pld	W	D	L	GF	GA	GD	Pts
12	Genoa	38	11	8	19	33	43	−10	41
13	Chievo	38	10	10	18	36	59	−23	40 (Note: Chievo finished ahead of Udinese on head-to-head points: Chievo 1–1 Udinese, Udinese 1–2 Chievo.)
14	Udinese	38	12	4	22	48	63	−15	40
15	Bologna	38	11	6	21	40	52	−12	39
16	Cagliari	38	11	6	21	33	61	−28	39

Source: Serie A, Soccerway
Rules for classification: 1) Points; 2) Head-to-head points; 3) Head-to-head goal difference; 4) Goal difference; 5) Goals scored; 6) Draw.

==== Results summary ====
Overall								Home						Away					
Pld	W	D	L	GF	GA	GD	Pts	W	D	L	GF	GA	GD	W	D	L	GF	GA	GD
38	12	4	22	48	63	−15	40	6	2	11	24	30	−6	6	2	11	24	33	−9

Last updated: 20 May 2018.
Source: Competitive matches

==== Results by round ====
Round	1	2	3	4	5	6	7	8	9	10	11	12	13	14	15	16	17	18	19	20	21	22	23	24	25	26	27	28	29	30	31	32	33	34	35	36	37	38
Ground	H	A	H	A	H	A	H	A	H	A	H	A	H	H	A	H	A	H	A	A	H	A	H	A	H	A	H	A	H	A	H	A	A	H	A	H	A	H
Result	L	L	W	L	L	L	W	L	L	W	W	L	L	L	W	W	W	W	W	D	D	W	D	L	L	L	L	L	L	L	L	L	L	L	D	L	W	W
Position	15	16	11	15	16	17	13	13	15	13	13	13	14	14	14	13	11	9	8	8	9	10	10	10	10	11	11	11	12	12	13	13	14	15	14	17	15	14

Updated to match(es) played on 20 May 2018. Source: Competitive matches
A = Away; H = Home; W = Win; D = Draw; L = Loss

==== Matches ====
20 August 2017 1	Udinese	1–2	Chievo	Udine
20:45 CEST (UTC+02:00)	Théréau 37'; Angella (yellow card) 64'; Perica (yellow card) 71'	Report	Inglese 15'; Birsa 54'; Rigoni (yellow card) 82'; Cacciatore (yellow card) 90+2'	Stadium: Dacia Arena; Attendance: 13,000; Referee: Claudio Gavillucci

27 August 2017 2	SPAL	3–2	Udinese	Ferrara
20:45 CEST (UTC+02:00)	Borriello 25'; Lazzari 53'; Väisänen (yellow card) 76'; Viviani (yellow card) 85'; Salamon (yellow card) 90+1'; Rizzo 90+4'	Report	Nuytinck 72'; Pezzella (yellow card) 75'; Théréau 87' (pen.)	Stadium: Stadio Paolo Mazza; Attendance: 11,000; Referee: Paolo Valeri

10 September 2017 3	Udinese	1–0	Genoa	Udine
15:00 CEST (UTC+02:00)	Jankto 15'; Behrami (yellow card) 25'; Lasagna (yellow card) 55'; Samir (yellow card) 71'; Pezzella (red card) 79'; Barák (yellow card) 90+2'	Report	Bertolacci (red card) 37'; Taarabt (yellow card) 90+3'	Stadium: Dacia Arena; Attendance: 14,032; Referee: Fabio Maresca

17 September 2017 4	Milan	2–1	Udinese	Milan
15:00 CEST (UTC+02:00)	Kalinić 22', 31'; Romagnoli (yellow card) 26'	Report	Barák (yellow card) 16'; Lasagna 28'; Samir (yellow card) 70'	Stadium: San Siro; Attendance: 49,473; Referee: Marco Guida

20 September 2017 5	Udinese	2–3	Torino	Udine
20:45 CEST (UTC+02:00)	Hallfreðsson (yellow card) 32'; De Paul 48' (pen.); Lasagna 75'	Report	Baselli (yellow card) 8'; Belotti 9'; Ansaldi (yellow card) 27'; Hallfreðsson 30' (o.g.); Ljajić (yellow card) 48', (goal) 67'; Rincón (yellow card) 54'; Berenguer (yellow card) 80'	Stadium: Dacia Arena; Attendance: 14,793; Referee: Gianluca Rocchi

23 September 2017 6	Roma	3–1	Udinese	Rome
15:00 CEST (UTC+02:00)	Džeko 12'; El Shaarawy 30', 45'	Report	López (yellow card) 42'; Stryger Larsen 90'	Stadium: Stadio Olimpico; Attendance: 32,457; Referee: Davide Massa

30 September 2017 7	Udinese	4–0	Sampdoria	Udine
18:00 CEST (UTC+02:00)	Barák (yellow card) 15'; De Paul 27' (pen.), (yellow card) 32'; López 66' (pen.), 85'; Fofana (yellow card) 76', (goal) 90+5' (pen.); Balić (yellow card) 83'	Report	Barreto (yellow card) 29' (yellow-red card) 40'	Stadium: Dacia Arena; Attendance: 17,935; Referee: Michael Fabbri

15 October 2017 8	Fiorentina	2–1	Udinese	Florence
12:30 CEST (UTC+02:00)	Théréau 28', 57'; Veretout (yellow card) 54'	Report	Samir (yellow card) 53', (goal) 72'	Stadium: Stadio Artemio Franchi; Attendance: 25,156; Referee: Massimiliano Irrati

22 October 2017 9	Udinese	2–6	Juventus	Udine
18:00 CEST (UTC+02:00)	Perica 8', (yellow card) 51'; Ali Adnan (yellow card) 26'; Samir (yellow card) 32'; Danilo 47', (yellow card) 55'; Hallfreðsson (yellow card) 58'; Fofana (yellow card) 83'	Report	Samir 14' (o.g.); Khedira 20', 59', 87'; Mandžukić (yellow card) 26' (yellow-red card) 26'; Rugani 52'; Cuadrado (yellow card) 61'; Pjanić 90'	Stadium: Dacia Arena; Attendance: 21,992; Referee: Daniele Doveri

25 October 2017 10	Sassuolo	0–1	Udinese	Reggio Emilia
20:45 CEST (UTC+02:00)	Peluso (yellow card) 54'; Cannavaro (yellow card) 90+4'	Report	Barák 32'; Samir (yellow card) 45+2'; Jankto (yellow card) 69'; Stryger Larsen (yellow card) 74'	Stadium: Mapei Stadium – Città del Tricolore; Attendance: 7,563; Referee: Paolo Tagliavento

29 October 2017 11	Udinese	2–1	Atalanta	Udine
15:00 CET (UTC+01:00)	De Paul 45+1' (pen.); Barák 68'	Report	Kurtić 29'; Toloi (yellow card) 41'; Castagne (yellow card) 56'	Stadium: Dacia Arena; Attendance: 16,448; Referee: Gianluca Rocchi

19 November 2017 13	Udinese	0–1	Cagliari	Udine
15:00 CET (UTC+01:00)	Angella (yellow card) 13'; Bizzarri (red card) 90+9'	Report	João Pedro 54'	Stadium: Dacia Arena; Attendance: 15,612; Referee: Gianluca Manganiello

26 November 2017 14	Udinese	0–1	Napoli	Udine
15:00 CET (UTC+01:00)	Danilo (yellow card) 21'; Perica (yellow card) 45+1'; Ali Adnan (yellow card) 65'; De Paul (yellow card) 72'; Widmer (yellow card) 89'	Report	Jorginho (yellow card) 27', (goal) 33'	Stadium: Dacia Arena; Attendance: 19,743; Referee: Marco Di Bello

4 December 2017 15	Crotone	0–3	Udinese	Crotone
19:00 CET (UTC+01:00)		Report	Jankto 40', 53'; Lasagna 66'	Stadium: Stadio Ezio Scida; Attendance: 8,564; Referee: Davide Massa

10 December 2017 16	Udinese	2–0	Benevento	Udine
15:00 CET (UTC+01:00)	Barák 5'; Lasagna 41'; Jankto (yellow card) 67'	Report	Costa (yellow card) 49'; Gyamfi (yellow card) 83'	Stadium: Dacia Arena; Attendance: 13,948; Referee: Gianluca Aureliano

16 December 2017 17	Internazionale	1–3	Udinese	Milan
15:00 CET (UTC+01:00)	Icardi 15'; Vecino (yellow card) 73'	Report	Lasagna 14'; Ali Adnan (yellow card) 28'; Nuytinck (yellow card) 43'; De Paul 61' (pen.); Fofana (yellow card) 66'; Widmer (yellow card) 74'; Barák 77'	Stadium: San Siro; Attendance: 52,011; Referee: Maurizio Mariani

23 December 2017 18	Udinese	4–0	Hellas Verona	Udine
15:00 CET (UTC+01:00)	Barák 27', 68'; Widmer 44'; Lasagna 80'	Report	Bessa (yellow card) 24'; Ferrari (yellow card) 48'; Caracciolo (yellow card) 64'	Stadium: Dacia Arena; Attendance: 17,291; Referee: Fabio Maresca

30 December 2017 19	Bologna	1–2	Udinese	Bologna
15:00 CET (UTC+01:00)	Danilo 27' (o.g.); Mirante (yellow card) 67'; Masina (yellow card) 78'	Report	Widmer 37'; Lasagna 48'; Stryger Larsen (yellow card) 53'; Behrami (yellow card) 57'; Danilo (yellow card) 76'	Stadium: Stadio Renato Dall'Ara; Attendance: 20,954; Referee: Claudio Gavillucci

5 January 2018 20	Chievo	1–1	Udinese	Verona
18:00 CET (UTC+01:00)	Radovanović 9'	Report	Tomović 41' (o.g.); Barák (yellow card) 90+3'	Stadium: Stadio Marc'Antonio Bentegodi; Attendance: 8,000; Referee: Daniele Chiffi

21 January 2018 21	Udinese	1–1	SPAL	Udine
15:00 CET (UTC+01:00)	Samir 11'; Pezzella (yellow card) 42'; Danilo (yellow card) 82'	Report	Felipe (yellow card) 13'; Kurtić (yellow card) 45+4'; Floccari 49'; Viviani (yellow card) 58'	Stadium: Dacia Arena; Attendance: 17,944; Referee: Daniele Doveri

24 January 2018 12	Lazio	3–0	Udinese	Rome
19:00 CET (UTC+01:00)	Samir 22' (o.g.); Nani 47'; Felipe Anderson 87'	Report	Perica (yellow card) 15'; Samir (yellow card) 45+2'	Stadium: Stadio Olimpico; Attendance: 23,000; Referee: Luca Banti
Note: Postponed due to inclement weather; originally schedule for 5 November 2017.

28 January 2018 22	Genoa	0–1	Udinese	Genoa
15:00 CET (UTC+01:00)	Bertolacci (yellow card) 13'; Spolli (yellow card) 60'	Report	Behrami 62'; Samir (red card) 65'	Stadium: Stadio Luigi Ferraris; Attendance: 18,896; Referee: Luca Pairetto

4 February 2018 23	Udinese	1–1	Milan	Udine
15:00 CET (UTC+01:00)	Stryger Larsen (yellow card) 33'; Donnarumma 76' (o.g.); Danilo (yellow card) 85'	Report	Suso 9'; Calabria (yellow card) 41' (yellow-red card) 68'	Stadium: Dacia Arena; Attendance: 23,758; Referee: Gianluca Manganiello

11 February 2018 24	Torino	2–0	Udinese	Turin
15:00 CET (UTC+01:00)	Nkoulou 32'; Rincón (yellow card) 58'; Belotti 66'; Burdisso (yellow card) 74'	Report	Hallfreðsson (yellow card) 87'	Stadium: Stadio Olimpico Grande Torino; Attendance: 18,740; Referee: Rosario Abisso

17 February 2018 25	Udinese	0–2	Roma	Udine
15:00 CET (UTC+01:00)	Stryger Larsen (yellow card) 49'; Perica (yellow card) 62'; Jankto (yellow card) 88'	Report	Ünder 70'; Džeko (yellow card) 77'; Perotti 90'	Stadium: Dacia Arena; Attendance: 18,753; Referee: Marco Di Bello

25 February 2018 26	Sampdoria	2–1	Udinese	Genoa
15:00 CET (UTC+01:00)	Murru (yellow card) 27'; Silvestre 35'; Caprari (yellow card) 62'; Zapata 83'	Report	Stryger Larsen (yellow card) 20'; Jankto (yellow card) 74'; Silvestre 90+5' (o.g.)	Stadium: Stadio Luigi Ferraris; Attendance: 17,767; Referee: Antonio Damato

11 March 2018 28	Juventus	2–0	Udinese	Turin
15:00 CET (UTC+01:00)	Chiellini (yellow card) 2'; Dybala 20', 49'	Report	Angella (yellow card) 19'; Perica (yellow card) 90'	Stadium: Allianz Stadium; Attendance: 40,300; Referee: Piero Giacomelli

18 March 2018 29	Udinese	1–2	Sassuolo	Udine
15:00 CET (UTC+01:00)	Fofana 44'; Barák (yellow card) 63'	Report	Adjapong (yellow card) 15'; Mazzitelli (yellow card) 29'; Ali Adnan 42' (o.g.); Sensi 74'	Stadium: Dacia Arena; Attendance: 14,970; Referee: Rosario Abisso

31 March 2018 30	Atalanta	2–0	Udinese	Bergamo
15:00 CEST (UTC+02:00)	Petagna 68', (yellow card) 68'; Masiello 74'	Report	Nuytinck (yellow card) 42'; De Paul (yellow card) 57'	Stadium: Stadio Atleti Azzurri d'Italia; Attendance: 17,204; Referee: Luca Pairetto

3 April 2018 27	Udinese	0–2	Fiorentina	Udine
18:30 CEST (UTC+02:00)	Hallfreðsson (yellow card) 27'; De Paul (yellow card) 67'	Report	Veretout 29' (pen.); Pezella (yellow card) 44'; Vitor Hugo (yellow card) 56'; Chiesa (yellow card) 57'; Saponara (yellow card) 67'; Simeone 71'	Stadium: Dacia Arena; Attendance: 15,450; Referee: Luca Banti
Note: Postponed due to Fiorentina player Davide Astori's death; originally scheduled for 4 March 2018.

8 April 2018 31	Udinese	1–2	Lazio	Udine
18:00 CEST (UTC+02:00)	Lasagna 13'	Report	Immobile 26'; Luis Alberto 37'; Caicedo (yellow card) 75'; Murgia (yellow card) 90+4'	Stadium: Dacia Arena; Attendance: 21,676; Referee: Gianluca Rocchi

14 April 2018 32	Cagliari	2–1	Udinese	Cagliari
15:00 CEST (UTC+02:00)	Pavoletti 21'; Cigarini (yellow card) 69'; Ceppitelli 84'; Barella (yellow card) 90+1'	Report	Lasagna 10'; Danilo (yellow card) 73'; Hallfreðsson (yellow card) 90'; Fofana (yellow card) 90+1'	Stadium: Sardegna Arena; Attendance: 13,755; Referee: Piero Giacomelli

18 April 2018 33	Napoli	4–2	Udinese	Naples
20:45 CEST (UTC+02:00)	Insigne 45+2'; Albiol 64'; Milik 70'; Tonelli 75'; Mário Rui (yellow card) 90+1'	Report	Danilo (yellow card) 35'; Jankto 41'; Ingelsson 55'; Ali Adnan (yellow card) 90+1'	Stadium: Stadio San Paolo; Attendance: 44,118; Referee: Gianpaolo Calvarese

22 April 2018 34	Udinese	1–2	Crotone	Udine
15:00 CEST (UTC+02:00)	Lasagna 5'; Behrami (yellow card) 58'; Jankto (yellow card) 68'	Report	Simy 7'; Faraoni 86'	Stadium: Dacia Arena; Attendance: 21,746; Referee: Marco Di Bello

29 April 2018 35	Benevento	3–3	Udinese	Benevento
15:00 CEST (UTC+02:00)	Venuti (yellow card) 12'; Viola 23'; Cataldi (yellow card) 27' (yellow-red card) 57'; Brignola (yellow card) 66'; Coda 76' (pen.); Sagna 90'	Report	Widmer 13'; Behrami (yellow card) 48'; Balić (yellow card) 64'; Pezzella (yellow card) 75'; Lasagna 78', 79'	Stadium: Stadio Ciro Vigorito; Attendance: 10,363; Referee: Fabio Maresca

6 May 2018 36	Udinese	0–4	Internazionale	Udine
12:30 CEST (UTC+02:00)	Danilo (yellow card) 34'; Fofana (red card) 49'	Report	Ranocchia 12'; Rafinha 43'; Icardi 45+1'; Valero 71'	Stadium: Dacia Arena; Attendance: 22,256; Referee: Paolo Mazzoleni

13 May 2018 37	Hellas Verona	0–1	Udinese	Verona
15:00 CEST (UTC+02:00)	Fossati (yellow card) 28'; Rômulo (yellow card) 74'	Report	Barák 20'; Samir (yellow card) 40'; Behrami (yellow card) 59'	Stadium: Stadio Marc'Antonio Bentegodi; Attendance: 14,190; Referee: Gianpaolo Calvarese

20 May 2018 38	Udinese	1–0	Bologna	Udine
18:00 CEST (UTC+02:00)	Fofana 30'	Report	Torosidis (yellow card) 24'; Verdi (yellow card) 28'	Stadium: Dacia Arena; Attendance: 24,015; Referee: Claudio Gavillucci

=== Coppa Italia ===
12 August 2017 Third round	Udinese	3–2	Frosinone	Udine
20:45 CEST (UTC+02:00)	Théréau 31'; Lasagna 64'; Jankto 72'	Report	Gori (yellow card) 35', (goal) 38'; Crivello 78'	Stadium: Dacia Arena; Attendance: 5,729; Referee: Piero Giacomelli

30 November 2017 Fourth round	Udinese	8–3	Perugia	Udine
18:00 CET (UTC+01:00)	Danilo 17'; López 34' (pen.), 49', 63' (pen.), 71'; Lasagna 40'; Nuytinck (yellow card) 45'; Ingelsson 82'; Jankto 86'	Report	Mustacchio (yellow card) 38', (goal) 61'; Cerri 45' (pen.); Bianco 55'; Emmanuello (yellow card) 62'; Casale (yellow card) 90'	Stadium: Dacia Arena; Attendance: 3,066; Referee: Luigi Nasca

19 December 2017 Round of 16	Napoli	1–0	Udinese	Naples
21:00 CET (UTC+01:00)	Insigne 71'	Report		Stadium: Stadio San Paolo; Attendance: 15,096; Referee: Fabrizio Pasqua

== Statistics ==
=== Appearances and goals ===
No.	Pos	Nat	Player	Total		Serie A		Coppa Italia	
No.	Pos	Nat	Player	Apps	Goals	Apps	Goals	Apps	Goals
Goalkeepers
1	GK	(Argentina) ARG	Albano Bizzarri	32	0	32	0	0	0
22	GK	(Italy) ITA	Simone Scuffet	9	0	6	0	3	0
25	GK	(Italy) ITA	Davide Borsellini	0	0	0	0	0	0
Defenders
3	DF	(Brazil) BRA	Samir	31	2	30+1	2	0	0
4	DF	(Italy) ITA	Gabriele Angella	12	0	9+3	0	0	0
5	DF	(Brazil) BRA	Danilo	35	2	32	1	3	1
11	DF	(Italy) ITA	Francesco Zampano	6	0	4+2	0	0	0
17	DF	(Netherlands) NED	Bram Nuytinck	30	1	26+1	1	3	0
19	DF	(Denmark) DEN	Jens Stryger Larsen	32	1	28+2	1	2	0
27	DF	(Switzerland) SUI	Silvan Widmer	26	3	18+6	3	1+1	0
53	DF	(Iraq) IRQ	Ali Adnan Kadhim	23	0	18+5	0	0	0
97	DF	(Italy) ITA	Giuseppe Pezzella	18	0	10+5	0	3	0
Midfielders
6	MF	(Ivory Coast) CIV	Seko Fofana	29	3	22+5	3	2	0
13	MF	(Sweden) SWE	Svante Ingelsson	8	2	3+4	1	0+1	1
14	MF	(Czech Republic) CZE	Jakub Jankto	39	6	28+8	4	3	2
21	MF	(Italy) ITA	Simone Pontisso	1	0	0+1	0	0	0
23	MF	(Iceland) ISL	Emil Hallfreðsson	21	0	8+11	0	2	0
72	MF	(Czech Republic) CZE	Antonín Barák	34	7	31+3	7	0	0
85	MF	(Switzerland) SUI	Valon Behrami	20	1	18+2	1	0	0
99	MF	(Croatia) CRO	Andrija Balić	23	0	11+10	0	2	0
Forwards
10	FW	(Argentina) ARG	Rodrigo De Paul	39	4	25+12	4	1+1	0
15	FW	(Italy) ITA	Kevin Lasagna	32	14	26+3	12	2+1	2
18	FW	(Croatia) CRO	Stipe Perica	22	1	9+13	1	0	0
20	FW	(Argentina) ARG	Maxi López	29	6	20+8	2	1	4
Players transferred out during the season
2	DF	(Mali) MLI	Molla Wagué	2	0	1	0	1	0
7	FW	(Brazil) BRA	Ryder Matos	5	0	1+3	0	1	0
9	FW	(Bosnia and Herzegovina) BIH	Riad Bajić	6	0	0+5	0	1	0
55	DF	(Poland) POL	Paweł Bochniewicz	2	0	0	0	1+1	0
77	FW	(France) FRA	Cyril Théréau	3	3	2	2	1	1
96	FW	(Brazil) BRA	Ewandro	1	0	0	0	0+1	0

Last updated: 20 May 2018
Source: Competitions

=== Goalscorers ===
Rank	No.	Pos	Nat	Name	Serie A	Coppa Italia	Total
1	15	FW	(Italy)	Kevin Lasagna	12	2	14
2	72	MF	(Czech Republic)	Antonín Barák	7	0	7
3	14	MF	(Czech Republic)	Jakub Jankto	4	2	6
3	20	FW	(Argentina)	Maxi López	2	4	6
5	10	FW	(Argentina)	Rodrigo De Paul	4	0	4
6	6	MF	(Ivory Coast)	Seko Fofana	3	0	3
6	27	DF	(Switzerland)	Silvan Widmer	3	0	3
6	77	FW	(France)	Cyril Théréau	2	1	3
9	3	DF	(Brazil)	Samir	2	0	2
9	5	DF	(Brazil)	Danilo	1	1	2
9	13	MF	(Sweden)	Svante Ingelsson	1	1	2
12	17	DF	(Netherlands)	Bram Nuytinck	1	0	1
12	18	FW	(Croatia)	Stipe Perica	1	0	1
12	19	DF	(Denmark)	Jens Stryger Larsen	1	0	1
12	85	MF	(Switzerland)	Valon Behrami	1	0	1
Own goal					3	0	3
Totals					48	11	59

Last updated: 20 May 2018

=== Clean sheets ===
Rank	No.	Pos	Nat	Name	Serie A	Coppa Italia	Total
1	1	GK	(Argentina)	Albano Bizzarri	8	0	8
2	22	GK	(Italy)	Simone Scuffet	1	0	1
Totals					9	0	9

Last updated: 20 May 2018

=== Disciplinary record ===
No.	Pos	Nat	Name	Serie A			Coppa Italia			Total		
No.	Pos	Nat	Name	Booked	(yellow card) (yellow-red card)	Sent off (straight red)	Booked	(yellow card) (yellow-red card)	Sent off (straight red)	Booked	(yellow card) (yellow-red card)	Sent off (straight red)
1	GK	(Argentina)	Albano Bizzarri	0	0	1	0	0	0	0	0	1
3	DF	(Brazil)	Samir	7	0	1	0	0	0	7	0	1
4	DF	(Italy)	Gabriele Angella	3	0	0	0	0	0	3	0	0
5	DF	(Brazil)	Danilo	8	0	0	0	0	0	8	0	0
17	DF	(Netherlands)	Bram Nuytinck	2	0	0	1	0	0	3	0	0
19	DF	(Denmark)	Jens Stryger Larsen	5	0	0	0	0	0	5	0	0
27	DF	(Switzerland)	Silvan Widmer	2	0	0	0	0	0	2	0	0
53	DF	(Iraq)	Ali Adnan	4	0	0	0	0	0	4	0	0
97	DF	(Italy)	Giuseppe Pezzella	3	0	1	0	0	0	3	0	1
6	MF	(Ivory Coast)	Seko Fofana	4	0	1	0	0	0	4	0	1
14	MF	(Czech Republic)	Jakub Jankto	5	0	0	0	0	0	5	0	0
23	MF	(Iceland)	Emil Hallfreðsson	5	0	0	0	0	0	5	0	0
72	MF	(Czech Republic)	Antonín Barák	5	0	0	0	0	0	5	0	0
85	MF	(Switzerland)	Valon Behrami	5	0	0	0	0	0	5	0	0
99	MF	(Croatia)	Andrija Balić	2	0	0	0	0	0	2	0	0
10	FW	(Argentina)	Rodrigo De Paul	4	0	0	0	0	0	4	0	0
15	FW	(Italy)	Kevin Lasagna	1	0	0	0	0	0	1	0	0
18	FW	(Croatia)	Stipe Perica	6	0	0	0	0	0	6	0	0
20	FW	(Argentina)	Maxi López	1	0	0	0	0	0	1	0	0
Totals				72	0	4	1	0	0	73	0	4

Last updated: 29 April 2018
