= 2022–23 Hellas Verona FC season =

Hellas Verona
2022–23 season
- President: Maurizio Setti
- Manager: Gabriele Cioffi (until 11 October); Salvatore Bocchetti (from 13 October to 4 December); Marco Zaffaroni (from 4 December)
- Stadium: Stadio Marcantonio Bentegodi
- Serie A: 17th (play-off winners)
- Coppa Italia: Round of 64
- Top goalscorer: League: Simone Verdi (5); All: Cyril Ngonge; Simone Verdi (5 each)
Home colours	Away colours	Third colours

The 2022–23 season was the 119th season in the history of Hellas Verona F.C. and their fourth consecutive season in the top flight. The club participated in Serie A and the Coppa Italia.

== Players ==
=== First-team squad ===
As of 2 September 2022

Note: Flags indicate national team as defined under FIFA eligibility rules; some limited exceptions apply. Players may hold more than one non-FIFA nationality.

No.	Pos.	Nation	Player
1	GK	ITA	Lorenzo Montipò
3	DF	SCO	Josh Doig
4	MF	POR	Miguel Veloso (captain)
5	DF	ITA	Davide Faraoni (vice-captain)
6	DF	SWE	Isak Hien
7	MF	ITA	Simone Verdi (on loan from Torino)
8	MF	SRB	Darko Lazović
9	FW	FRA	Thomas Henry
10	MF	AUS	Ajdin Hrustic
11	FW	ITA	Kevin Lasagna
14	MF	SRB	Ivan Ilić
16	GK	ITA	Mattia Chiesa
17	DF	ITA	Federico Ceccherini
18	MF	CMR	Martin Hongla
19	FW	BIH	Milan Đurić
20	FW	ITA	Roberto Piccoli (on loan from Atalanta)

No.	Pos.	Nation	Player
21	DF	GER	Koray Günter
22	GK	ITA	Alessandro Berardi
23	DF	ITA	Giangiacomo Magnani
24	MF	ITA	Filippo Terracciano
27	DF	POL	Paweł Dawidowicz
28	MF	POL	Mateusz Praszelik (on loan from Śląsk Wrocław)
29	DF	ITA	Fabio Depaoli (on loan from Sampdoria)
30	FW	SLE	Yayah Kallon (on loan from Genoa)
32	DF	COL	Juan David Cabal
34	GK	ITA	Simone Perilli
42	DF	ITA	Diego Coppola
61	MF	CMR	Adrien Tameze
70	DF	ITA	Davide Bragantini
72	MF	ITA	Alessandro Cortinovis (on loan from Atalanta)
74	GK	ITA	Elia Boseggia
77	MF	GHA	Ibrahim Kakari

== Pre-season and friendlies ==
Win Draw Loss

9 July 2022 Friendly	Hellas Verona (Italy)	9–0	(Italy) US Primiero	Mezzano, Italy
--:-- CEST (UTC+2)		Report		Stadium: Centro Sportivo Intercomunale; Referee: Sajmir Kumara

13 July 2022 Friendly	Hellas Verona A (Italy)	1–1	(Italy) Hellas Verona B	Mezzano, Italy
17:00 CEST (UTC+2)	Đurić 4'	Report	Lasagna 34'	Stadium: Centro Sportivo Intercomunale; Referee: Silvia Gasperotti
Note: Match was played in two 30-minute halves.

16 July 2022 Friendly	Hellas Verona (Italy)	1–0	(Italy) Virtus Verona	Mezzano, Italy
17:00 CEST (UTC+2)	Piccoli 49' (pen.)	Report		Stadium: Centro Sportivo Intercomunale; Referee: Fabio Cevenini

23 July 2022 Friendly	1899 Hoffenheim (Germany)	3–2	(Italy) Hellas Verona	Sinsheim, Germany
15:30 CEST (UTC+2)	Baumgartner (yellow card) 47', (goal) 84'; Prömel 58', 89'	Report	Lasagna 12', 29'; Lazović (yellow card) 40'	Stadium: Rhein-Neckar-Arena; Attendance: 6,427; Referee: Lars Erbst (Germany)
Note: Match was played over four 30-minute periods.

30 July 2022 Friendly	Hellas Verona (Italy)	4–3	(Italy) Cremonese	Castelnuovo del Garda, Italy
18:00 CEST (UTC+2)	Henry 19'; Lasagna 23', 58'; Piccoli 90+1' (pen.)	Report	Tsadjout 42' (pen.); Valeri 57', 79'	Stadium: Sporting Center Paradiso; Referee: Andrea Colombo

25 September 2022 Friendly	Hellas Verona (Italy)	Cancelled	(Slovenia) Koper	Italy
12:00 CEST (UTC+2)		Report

18 December 2022 Friendly	Hellas Verona (Italy)	0–0	(Croatia) Istra 1961	Verona, Italy
14:30 CET (UTC+1)		Report		Stadium: Stadio Marcantonio Bentegodi; Referee: Lorenzo Maggioni

22 December 2022 Friendly	Hellas Verona (Italy)	0–1	(Italy) Bologna	Verona, Italy
14:30 CET (UTC+1)			Orsolini 44'	Stadium: Stadio Marcantonio Bentegodi; Referee: Daniele Perenzoni

== Competitions ==
=== Overall record ===
Competition	First match	Last match	Starting round	Final position	Record							
Competition	First match	Last match	Starting round	Final position	Pld	W	D	L	GF	GA	GD	Win %
Serie A	15 August 2022	4 June 2023	Matchday 1	17th	38	7	10	21	31	59	−28	18.42
Serie A relegation tie-breaker	11 June 2023		Play-off	Winners	1	1	0	0	3	1	+2	100.00
Coppa Italia	7 August 2022		Round of 64	Round of 64	1	0	0	1	1	4	−3	0.00
Total					40	8	10	22	35	64	−29	20.00

Source: Soccerway

=== Serie A ===
==== League table ====
Pos	Team	Pld	W	D	L	GF	GA	GD	Pts	Qualification or relegation
15	Salernitana	38	9	15	14	48	62	−14	42	
16	Lecce	38	8	12	18	33	46	−13	36	
17	Hellas Verona	38	7	10	21	31	59	−28	31	Qualification for the Relegation tie-breaker
18	Spezia (R)	38	6	13	19	31	62	−31	31	Qualification for the Relegation tie-breaker (Note: Should the first and second, or 17th and 18th-placed teams at the end of the season be tied on points, a play-off tiebreaker match was held at a neutral site to determine the title and final team relegated respectively.)
19	Cremonese (R)	38	5	12	21	36	69	−33	27	Relegation to Serie B

Source: Serie A
Rules for classification: 1) Points; 2) Tiebreaker for Champions team and third relegated team; 3) Head-to-head points; 4) Head-to-head goal difference; 5) Goal difference; 6) Goals scored; 7) Draw. (Note: Head-to-head record is used only after all the matches between the teams in question have been played)
(R) Relegated

==== Results summary ====
Overall								Home						Away					
Pld	W	D	L	GF	GA	GD	Pts	W	D	L	GF	GA	GD	W	D	L	GF	GA	GD
38	7	10	21	31	59	−28	31	6	3	10	20	32	−12	1	7	11	11	27	−16

Source: Serie A

==== Results by round ====
Round	1	2	3	4	5	6	7	8	9	10	11	12	13	14	15	16	17	18	19	20	21	22	23	24	25	26	27	28	29	30	31	32	33	34	35	36	37	38
Ground	H	A	H	A	H	A	A	H	A	H	A	H	A	H	H	A	H	A	H	A	H	H	A	H	A	H	A	A	H	A	H	A	H	A	H	A	H	A
Result	L	D	L	D	W	L	L	L	L	L	L	L	L	L	L	D	W	L	W	D	D	W	L	L	D	D	L	L	W	D	W	D	L	W	L	L	D	L
Position	19	17	17	17	13	14	17	18	18	18	19	19	20	20	20	20	18	18	18	18	18	18	18	18	18	18	18	18	18	18	18	18	18	17	18	18	18	17

Source: Serie A
A = Away; H = Home; W = Win; D = Draw; L = Loss

==== Matches ====
The league fixtures were announced on 24 June 2022.

15 August 2022 1	Hellas Verona	2–5	Napoli	Verona
18:30 CEST (UTC+2)	Lasagna 29'; Hongla (yellow card) 45+1'; Henry 48'; Amione (yellow card) 52'	Report	Kvaratskhelia 37'; Osimhen 45+3', (yellow card) 54'; Zieliński 55'; Lobotka 65'; Politano 79'; Kim (yellow card) 90+3'	Stadium: Stadio Marcantonio Bentegodi; Attendance: 16,967; Referee: Michael Fabbri

21 August 2022 2	Bologna	1–1	Hellas Verona	Bologna
20:45 CEST (UTC+2)	Arnautović 21', (yellow card) 90'; Bonifazi (yellow card) 53'; Orsolini (red card) 78'; Domínguez (yellow card) 87'	Report	Hongla (yellow card) 23'; Coppola (yellow card) 26'; Henry 43'; Günter (yellow card) 47'	Stadium: Stadio Renato Dall'Ara; Attendance: 17,725; Referee: Matteo Marcenaro

28 August 2022 3	Hellas Verona	0–1	Atalanta	Verona
18:30 CEST (UTC+2)	Ceccherini (yellow card) 62'; Hien (yellow card) 82'; Henry (yellow card) 82'	Report	Soppy (yellow card) 23'; Koopmeiners (yellow card) 38', (goal) 50'; Malinovskyi (yellow card) 59'	Stadium: Stadio Marcantonio Bentegodi; Attendance: 16,106; Referee: Alessandro Prontera

31 August 2022 4	Empoli	1–1	Hellas Verona	Empoli
18:30 CEST (UTC+2)	Baldanzi 26'	Report	Faraoni (yellow card) 9'; Ceccherini (yellow card) 34'; Dawidowicz (yellow card) 66'; Veloso (yellow card) 67'; Kallon 69'	Stadium: Stadio Carlo Castellani; Attendance: 7,269; Referee: Marco Serra

4 September 2022 5	Hellas Verona	2–1	Sampdoria	Verona
18:00 CEST (UTC+2)	Audero 44' (o.g.); Doig 45+3'; Ilić (yellow card) 48'; Henry (yellow card) 62'	Report	Sabiri (yellow card) 6'; Caputo 40'; Colley (yellow card) 61'	Stadium: Stadio Marcantonio Bentegodi; Attendance: 16,675; Referee: Paolo Valeri

11 September 2022 6	Lazio	2–0	Hellas Verona	Rome
18:00 CEST (UTC+2)	Immobile 68'; Luis Alberto (yellow card) 79', (goal) 90+5'; Hysaj (yellow card) 83'	Report	Veloso (yellow card) 35'; Ceccherini (yellow card) 44'; Coppola (yellow card) 63'; Cabal (yellow card) 66'; Hien (yellow card) 80'	Stadium: Stadio Olimpico; Attendance: 38,000; Referee: Massimiliano Irrati

18 September 2022 7	Fiorentina	2–0	Hellas Verona	Florence
15:00 CEST (UTC+2)	Ikoné 13'; Mandragora (yellow card) 23'; Biraghi (penalty missed) 26'; Amrabat (yellow card) 32'; Bonaventura (yellow card) 58'; Barák (yellow card) 74'; González 90'	Report	Coppola (yellow card) 25'; Henry (yellow card) 34'; Hien (yellow card) 46'; Günter (yellow card) 76'	Stadium: Stadio Artemio Franchi; Attendance: 32,216; Referee: Antonio Rapuano

3 October 2022 8	Hellas Verona	1–2	Udinese	Verona
20:45 CEST (UTC+2)	Doig 23'; Veloso (yellow card) 31'; Henry (yellow card) 77'; Depaoli (yellow card) 84'	Report	Pérez (yellow card) 47'; Beto 70'; Becão (yellow card) 74'; Pereyra (yellow card) 86'; Bijol 90+3'	Stadium: Stadio Marcantonio Bentegodi; Attendance: 15,352; Referee: Daniele Minelli

9 October 2022 9	Salernitana	2–1	Hellas Verona	Salerno
15:00 CEST (UTC+2)	Piątek 18', (yellow card) 22'; Sambia (yellow card) 90+2'; Dia 90+4'; Daniliuc (yellow card) 90+4'; Radovanović (red card) 90+8'	Report	Hien (yellow card) 23'; Depaoli (yellow card) 45+2', (goal) 56'; Sulemana (yellow card) 79'; Ceccherini (red card) 90+8'	Stadium: Stadio Arechi; Attendance: 15,922; Referee: Davide Ghersini

16 October 2022 10	Hellas Verona	1–2	Milan	Verona
20:45 CEST (UTC+2)	Günter 19'; Magnani (yellow card) 67'; Hongla (yellow card) 68'; Faraoni (yellow card) 75'	Report	Veloso 9' (o.g.); Hernandez (yellow card) 81'; Tonali 81'; Rebić (yellow card) 90'	Stadium: Stadio Marcantonio Bentegodi; Attendance: 22,904; Referee: Davide Massa

24 October 2022 11	Sassuolo	2–1	Hellas Verona	Reggio Emilia
20:45 CEST (UTC+2)	Laurienté 32'; Erlić (yellow card) 48'; Frattesi 74'	Report	Ceccherini 2', (yellow card) 27'; Faraoni (yellow card) 75'; Đurić (yellow card) 90+3'	Stadium: Mapei Stadium – Città del Tricolore; Attendance: 11,368; Referee: Alberto Santoro

31 October 2022 12	Hellas Verona	1–3	Roma	Verona
18:30 CET (UTC+1)	Ceccherini (yellow card) 20'; Dawidowicz 26', (red card) 36'; Hongla (yellow card) 71'; Hien (yellow card) 81'	Report	Cristante (yellow card) 23'; Zaniolo 45+2'; Volpato 88'; El Shaarawy 90+2'	Stadium: Stadio Marcantonio Bentegodi; Attendance: 24,000; Referee: Juan Luca Sacchi

6 November 2022 13	Monza	2–0	Hellas Verona	Monza
15:00 CET (UTC+1)	Izzo (yellow card) 4'; Marlon (yellow card) 33'; Carlos Augusto 68', (yellow card) 76'; Colpani 90'	Report	Günter (yellow card) 19'; Magnani (red card) 27'	Stadium: Stadio Brianteo; Attendance: 11,723; Referee: Francesco Cosso

10 November 2022 14	Hellas Verona	0–1	Juventus	Verona
18:30 CET (UTC+1)	Dawidowicz (yellow card) 55'; Đurić (yellow card) 57'; Veloso (yellow card) 77'	Report	Bonucci (yellow card) 6'; Kean 60'; Alex Sandro (yellow card) 81', (red card) 90+3'	Stadium: Stadio Marcantonio Bentegodi; Attendance: 21,934; Referee: Marco Di Bello

13 November 2022 15	Hellas Verona	1–2	Spezia	Verona
15:00 CET (UTC+1)	Verdi 30'; Lasagna (yellow card) 45+2'; Tameze (yellow card) 78'	Report	Ampadu (yellow card) 33'; Holm (yellow card) 35'; Nzola 53', 69'; Amian (yellow card) 86'; Ellertsson (yellow card) 90+4'	Stadium: Stadio Marcantonio Bentegodi; Attendance: 15,713; Referee: Fabio Maresca

4 January 2023 16	Torino	1–1	Hellas Verona	Turin
14:30 CET (UTC+1)	Miranchuk 64'; Schuurs (yellow card) 89'	Report	Đurić 45'; Dawidowicz (yellow card) 90+5'	Stadium: Stadio Olimpico Grande Torino; Attendance: 15,845; Referee: Federico Dionisi

9 January 2023 17	Hellas Verona	2–0	Cremonese	Verona
18:30 CET (UTC+1)	Lazović 9', 26'; Kallon (yellow card) 23'; Đurić (yellow card) 63'; Verdi (yellow card) 88'	Report	Castagnetti (yellow card) 32'; Sernicola (yellow card) 54'; Lochoshvili (yellow card) 73'; Okereke (yellow card) 90'	Stadium: Stadio Marcantonio Bentegodi; Attendance: 3,804; Referee: Maurizio Mariani

14 January 2023 18	Internazionale	1–0	Hellas Verona	Milan
20:45 CET (UTC+1)	Martínez 3'	Report	Dawidowicz (yellow card) 49'; Hien (yellow card) 53'; Sulemana (yellow card) 90'	Stadium: San Siro; Attendance: 70,734; Referee: Michael Fabbri

21 January 2023 19	Hellas Verona	2–0	Lecce	Verona
15:00 CET (UTC+1)	Tameze (yellow card) 17'; Dawidowicz (yellow card) 23'; Depaoli 40'; Lazović 54'; Ceccherini (yellow card) 74'	Report		Stadium: Stadio Marcantonio Bentegodi; Attendance: 19,955; Referee: Federico La Penna

30 January 2023 20	Udinese	1–1	Hellas Verona	Udine
20:45 CET (UTC+1)	Samardžić 21'; Beto (yellow card) 30'	Report	Becão 4' (o.g.); Magnani (yellow card) 17'; Ceccherini (yellow card) 42'; Sulemana (yellow card) 50'	Stadium: Stadio Friuli; Attendance: 17,276; Referee: Luca Pairetto

6 February 2023 21	Hellas Verona	1–1	Lazio	Verona
18:30 CET (UTC+1)	Duda (yellow card) 24'; Magnani (yellow card) 34'; Ngonge 51'; Hien (yellow card) 81'; Depaoli (yellow card) 87'	Report	Zaccagni (yellow card) 28'; Pedro 45'	Stadium: Stadio Marcantonio Bentegodi; Attendance: 20,329; Referee: Giovanni Ayroldi

13 February 2023 22	Hellas Verona	1–0	Salernitana	Verona
18:30 CET (UTC+1)	Ngonge 31'; Magnani (yellow card) 49'; Verdi (yellow card) 88'	Report	Bronn (yellow card) 21'; Coulibaly (yellow card) 60'; Pirola (yellow card) 69'	Stadium: Stadio Marcantonio Bentegodi; Attendance: 17,832; Referee: Paolo Valeri

19 February 2023 23	Roma	1–0	Hellas Verona	Rome
20:45 CET (UTC+1)	Smalling (yellow card) 38'; Solbakken 45'	Report	Hien (yellow card) 28'; Ngonge (yellow card) 42'	Stadium: Stadio Olimpico; Attendance: 61,009; Referee: Simone Sozza

27 February 2023 24	Hellas Verona	0–3	Fiorentina	Verona
18:30 CET (UTC+1)	Doig (yellow card) 24'; Faraoni (yellow card) 34'; Braaf (yellow card) 82'	Report	Barák 12', (yellow card) 29'; Igor (yellow card) 27'; Cabral 38'; Amrabat (yellow card) 50'; Biraghi 89'	Stadium: Stadio Marcantonio Bentegodi; Attendance: 17,787; Referee: Federico La Penna

5 March 2023 25	Spezia	0–0	Hellas Verona	La Spezia
12:30 CET (UTC+1)	Marchetti (red card) 83'; Reca (yellow card) 90'; Żurkowski (yellow card) 90+5'	Report	Terracciano (yellow card) 90+3'	Stadium: Stadio Alberto Picco; Attendance: 10,020; Referee: Daniele Doveri
Note: Marchetti was sent off for dissent while a substitute.

12 March 2023 26	Hellas Verona	1–1	Monza	Verona
15:00 CET (UTC+1)	Verdi 51'; Coppola (yellow card) 57'; Duda (yellow card) 63'	Report	Sensi 55'	Stadium: Stadio Marcantonio Bentegodi; Attendance: 18,061; Referee: Marco Piccinini

19 March 2023 27	Sampdoria	3–1	Hellas Verona	Genoa
12:30 CET (UTC+1)	Gabbiadini 24', 35'; Đuričić (yellow card) 42'; Nuytinck (yellow card) 83'; Zanoli (yellow card) 85', (goal) 90+8'	Report	Faraoni 88'; Coppola (yellow card) 90+6'; Duda (yellow card) 90+7'	Stadium: Stadio Luigi Ferraris; Attendance: 18,228; Referee: Maurizio Mariani

1 April 2023 28	Juventus	1–0	Hellas Verona	Turin
20:45 CEST (UTC+2)	Kean 55', (yellow card) 59'	Report	Depaoli (yellow card) 44'; Gaich (yellow card) 58'	Stadium: Juventus Stadium; Attendance: 40,105; Referee: Matteo Marchetti

8 April 2023 29	Hellas Verona	2–1	Sassuolo	Verona
18:30 CEST (UTC+2)	Veloso (yellow card) 43'; Ceccherini 84'; Lasagna (yellow card) 85'; Magnani (yellow card) 90'; Gaich 90+5'	Report	Laurienté (yellow card) 20'; Harroui 34'; Ruan (yellow card) 48'; Pinamonti (yellow card) 57'; Lopez (yellow card) 90'	Stadium: Stadio Marcantonio Bentegodi; Attendance: 23,660; Referee: Francesco Fourneau

15 April 2023 30	Napoli	0–0	Hellas Verona	Naples
18:00 CEST (UTC+2)	Kvaratskhelia (yellow card) 90+1'	Report	Ceccherini (yellow card) 14'; Terracciano (yellow card) 78'; Dawidowicz (yellow card) 90'; Verdi (yellow card) 90+4'	Stadium: Stadio Diego Armando Maradona; Attendance: 39,216; Referee: Federico La Penna

21 April 2023 31	Hellas Verona	2–1	Bologna	Verona
20:45 CEST (UTC+2)	Verdi 45+6' (pen.), 62'; Faraoni (yellow card) 56'; Duda (yellow card) 72'; Montipò (yellow card) 90'	Report	Posch (yellow card) 25'; Barrow (yellow card) 31'; Domínguez (yellow card) 37', (goal) 90+4'; Skorupski (yellow card) 45+4'	Stadium: Stadio Marcantonio Bentegodi; Attendance: 21,031; Referee: Maurizio Mariani

30 April 2023 32	Cremonese	1–1	Hellas Verona	Cremona
15:00 CEST (UTC+2)	Okereke 9'; Quagliata (red card) 62'	Report	Verdi 75'	Stadium: Stadio Giovanni Zini; Attendance: 11,645; Referee: Daniele Doveri

3 May 2023 33	Hellas Verona	0–6	Internazionale	Verona
21:00 CEST (UTC+2)		Report	Gaich 31' (o.g.); Çalhanoğlu 36'; Džeko 38', 61'; Martínez 55', 90+2'	Stadium: Stadio Marcantonio Bentegodi; Attendance: 19,409; Referee: Daniele Orsato

7 May 2023 34	Lecce	0–1	Hellas Verona	Lecce
20:45 CEST (UTC+2)	Hjulmand (yellow card) 23'; Oudin (yellow card) 79'	Report	Faraoni (yellow card) 19'; Abildgaard (yellow card) 35'; Magnani (yellow card) 52'; Ngonge 71', (yellow card) 86'; Montipò (yellow card) 82'	Stadium: Stadio Via del mare Attendance: 24,768; Referee: Davide Massa

13 May 2023 35	Hellas Verona	0–1	Torino	Verona
12:30 CEST (UTC+2)	Tameze (yellow card) 45+2'; Abildgaard (yellow card) 71'; Depaoli (yellow card) 79'	Report	Ilić (yellow card) 25'; Vlašić 29'; Djidji (yellow card) 63'	Stadium: Marcantonio Bentegodi; Attendance: 19,568; Referee: Marco Di Bello

20 May 2023 36	Atalanta	3–1	Hellas Verona	Bergamo
18:00 CEST (UTC+2)	Zappacosta 22'; Koopmeiners (yellow card) 24'; Pašalić 53'; Højlund 62'	Report	Lazović 11'; Hien (yellow card) 28'; Depaoli (yellow card) 36'; Faraoni (yellow card) 90+3'	Stadium: Gewiss Stadium; Attendance: 9,297; Referee: Simone Sozza

28 May 2023 37	Hellas Verona	1–1	Empoli	Verona
12:30 CEST (UTC+2)	Cabal (yellow card) 10'; Veloso (yellow card) 56'; Gaich 61', (yellow card) 63'; Ceccherini (yellow card) 87'	Report	Magnani 90+6' (o.g.)	Stadium: Stadio Marcantonio Bentegodi; Attendance: 22,831; Referee: Daniele Chiffi

4 June 2023 38	Milan	3–1	Hellas Verona	Milan
21:00 CEST (UTC+2)	Giroud 45+2' (pen.); Leão 85', 90+2'; Hernandez (yellow card) 89'	Report	Magnani (yellow card) 49'; Sulemana (yellow card) 60'; Cabal (yellow card) 61'; Faraoni 71'; Depaoli (yellow card) 77'	Stadium: San Siro; Attendance: 71,102; Referee: Paolo Valeri

==== Relegation tie-breaker ====
11 June 2023 Play-off	Spezia	1–3	Hellas Verona	Reggio Emilia
20:45 CEST (UTC+2)	Ampadu 15'; Nzola (penalty missed) 70'; Reca (yellow card) 71'; Esposito (yellow card) 77'	Report	Faraoni 5', (red card) 68'; Hien (yellow card) 14'; Ngonge 26', 38', (yellow card) 70'; Depaoli (yellow card) 28'; Dawidowicz (yellow card) 32'; Montipò (yellow card) 66'	Stadium: Mapei Stadium – Città del Tricolore; Attendance: 15,000; Referee: Daniele Orsato

=== Coppa Italia ===
7 August 2022 Round of 64	Hellas Verona	1–4	Bari	Verona
18:00 CEST (UTC+2)	Lasagna 16'; Lazović (yellow card) 47'; Faraoni (red card) 69'	Report	Di Cesare (yellow card) 24'; Folorunsho 30'; Cheddira 44', 53' (pen.), 78'; Bellomo (yellow card) 84'	Stadium: Stadio Marcantonio Bentegodi; Attendance: 6,576; Referee: Niccolò Baroni
