= Antonín Barák =

Czech footballer (born 1994)

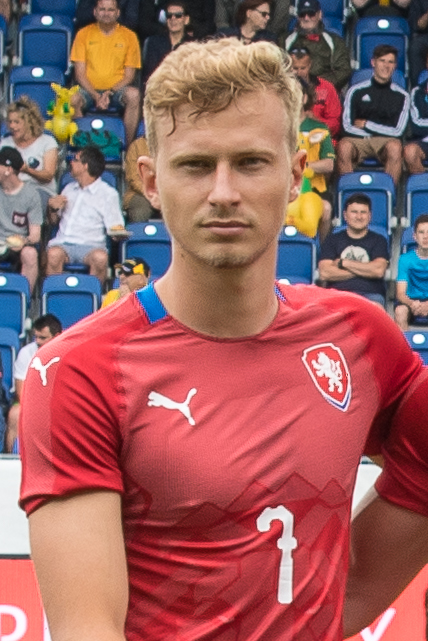
- Barák with the Czech Republic in 2018

Personal information
- Full name: Antonín Barák
- Date of birth: 3 December 1994 (age 31)
- Place of birth: Příbram, Czech Republic
- Height: 1.90 m (6 ft 3 in)
- Position: Attacking midfielder

Team information
- Current team: APOEL
- Number: 72

Youth career
- –2013: Příbram

Senior career*
Years	Team	Apps	(Gls)
2013–2015	Příbram	13	(3)
2014–2015	→ Vlašim (loan)	27	(5)
2016–2017	Slavia Prague	34	(8)
2017–2021	Udinese	50	(7)
2020	→ Lecce (loan)	16	(2)
2020–2021	→ Hellas Verona (loan)	34	(7)
2021–2023	Hellas Verona	30	(11)
2022–2023	→ Fiorentina (loan)	30	(2)
2023–2026	Fiorentina	22	(2)
2024–2025	→ Kasımpaşa (loan)	22	(2)
2025–2026	→ Sampdoria (loan)	28	(1)
2026–	APOEL	0	(0)

International career
2012	Czech Republic U19	2	(0)
2014–2015	Czech Republic U20	3	(0)
2015–2017	Czech Republic U21	9	(1)
2016–2024	Czech Republic	44	(11)
- * Club domestic league appearances and goals as of 13 May 2026

Antonín Barák (born 3 December 1994) is a Czech professional footballer who plays as an attacking midfielder for Cypriot First Division club APOEL.

After starting his professional career at Příbram in the Czech First League, Barák played for Slavia Prague before moving to Italy, where he represented Udinese, Lecce and Hellas Verona in Serie A. He later joined Fiorentina in August 2022, where he featured regularly in domestic and European competitions and was part of the squad that reached the UEFA Europa Conference League finals in 2023 and 2024.

A former Czech youth international, Barák made his senior international debut in 2016 and represented the Czech Republic at UEFA Euro 2020 and UEFA Euro 2024 editions of the UEFA European Championships.

== Club career ==
=== Slavia Prague ===
Barák made his career league debut for 1. FK Příbram on 1 June 2013 in a Czech First League 1–1 away draw against FC Slovan Liberec. He signed for Czech First League club SK Slavia Prague on 30 December 2015 with a contract until June 2019. On 31 January 2017, Slavia Prague announced that he had signed with Udinese Calcio for a fee of €3 million, but that the transfer would go through after the end of the season.

=== Lecce and loan to Hellas Verona ===
On 29 January 2020, Barák joined Serie A club Lecce on loan. On 2 February, he scored a goal in a 4–0 home win against Torino, his first match with the salentini team. On 17 September 2020, Barák moved on loan to Hellas Verona. Verona held an obligation to purchase his rights if certain performance conditions were met.

=== Fiorentina and loan moves ===
On 26 August 2022, Barák joined fellow Italian side Fiorentina on loan with an option to buy at the end of the season.

On 31 January 2023, Fiorentina exercised their option to make the transfer permanent. In the 2022–23 season, Barak helped Fiorentina in the Europa Conference League and formed a main attacking force with Luka Jović and Nicolás González, scoring 5 goals in 11 matches. In the second leg of the semi-final against Basel, Barak started from the bench and was substituted on 105th minute of extra time, after which he scored an injury time winner for Fiorentina in 129th minute, causing his club to reach the final in Prague, Czech Republic.

On 7 September 2024, Barák was loaned by Kasımpaşa in Turkey.

On 1 September 2025, he moved on loan to Sampdoria in Serie B.

=== APOEL ===
On 4 September 2026, Barák signed a contract with Cypriot First Division club APOEL.

== International career ==
In November 2016, Barák received his first call-up to the Czech senior squad for friendly matches against Norway and Denmark. He debuted in the latter match on 15 November and scored a goal.

On 26 March 2017, Barák scored two goals in his competitive debut, a 6–0 victory over San Marino in the 2018 FIFA World Cup qualifying stage on 26 March 2017. He was later selected for the rescheduled UEFA Euro 2020.

On 26 June 2024, during the UEFA Euro 2024, Barák was sent off in the 20th minute of a match against Turkey. This set a record for the fastest send-off of a footballer in the European Championship history.

== Personal life ==
Barák is in a relationship with Czech model Nikola Mužíková. They have two children together.

== Career statistics ==
=== Club ===
As of match played 25 August 2024

Appearances and goals by club, season and competition
Club	Season	League			Cup		Europe		Other		Total	
Club	Season	Division	Apps	Goals	Apps	Goals	Apps	Goals	Apps	Goals	Apps	Goals
Příbram	2012–13	Fortuna Liga	1	0	0	0	–		–		1	0
Příbram	2013–14	Fortuna Liga	0	0	0	0	–		–		0	0
Příbram	2015–16	Fortuna Liga	12	3	2	1	–		–		14	4
Příbram	Total		13	3	2	1	–		–		15	4
Vlašim (loan)	2014–15	Czech National League	27	5	0	0	–		–		27	5
Slavia Prague	2015–16	Fortuna Liga	9	4	0	0	–		–		9	4
Slavia Prague	2016–17	Fortuna Liga	25	4	3	1	5 (Note: Appearances in UEFA Europa League)	0	–		33	5
Slavia Prague	Total		34	8	3	1	5	0	–		42	9
Udinese	2017–18	Serie A	34	7	0	0	–		–		34	7
Udinese	2018–19	Serie A	8	0	1	0	–		–		9	0
Udinese	2019–20	Serie A	8	0	3	1	–		–		11	1
Udinese	Total		50	7	4	1	–		–		54	8
Lecce (loan)	2019–20	Serie A	16	2	0	0	–		–		16	2
Hellas Verona (loan)	2020–21	Serie A	34	7	2	0	–		–		36	7
Hellas Verona	2021–22	Serie A	29	11	1	0	–		–		30	11
Hellas Verona	2022–23	Serie A	1	0	1	0	–		–		2	0
Hellas Verona	Total		64	18	4	0	–		–		68	18
Fiorentina (loan)	2022–23	Serie A	30	2	5	1	12 (Note: Appearances in UEFA Europa Conference League)	5	–		47	8
Fiorentina	2023–24	Serie A	21	2	2	0	10	3	1 (Note: Appearance in Supercoppa Italiana)	0	34	5
Fiorentina	2024–25	Serie A	1	0	0	0	0	0	—		1	0
Fiorentina	Total		22	2	2	0	10	3	1	0	35	5
Career total			256	47	20	4	26	6	1	0	304	59

=== International ===
Appearances and goals by national team and year
National team	Year	Apps	Goals
Czech Republic	2016	1	1
Czech Republic	2017	6	4
Czech Republic	2018	5	0
Czech Republic	2019	0	0
Czech Republic	2020	3	0
Czech Republic	2021	14	3
Czech Republic	2022	6	0
Czech Republic	2023	2	0
Czech Republic	2024	7	3
Total		44	11

List of international goals scored by Antonín Barák
No.	Date	Venue	Cap	Opponent	Score	Result	Competition
1	15 November 2016	Městský stadion, Mladá Boleslav, Czech Republic	1	Denmark	1–0	1–1	Friendly
2	26 March 2017	San Marino Stadium, Serravalle, San Marino	3	San Marino	1–0	6–0	2018 FIFA World Cup qualification
3	26 March 2017	San Marino Stadium, Serravalle, San Marino	3	San Marino	3–0	6–0	2018 FIFA World Cup qualification
4	5 October 2017	Baku Olympic Stadium, Baku, Azerbaijan	4	Azerbaijan	2–1	2–1	2018 FIFA World Cup qualification
5	11 November 2017	Abdullah bin Khalifa Stadium, Doha, Qatar	5	Qatar	1–0	1–0	Friendly
6	24 March 2021	Arena Lublin, Lublin, Poland	16	Estonia	2–1	6–2	2022 FIFA World Cup qualification
7	2 September 2021	Městský stadion, Ostrava, Czech Republic	24	Belarus	1–0	1–0	2022 FIFA World Cup qualification
8	11 November 2021	Andrův stadion, Olomouc, Czech Republic	28	Kuwait	1–0	7–0	Friendly
9	22 March 2024	Ullevaal Stadion, Oslo, Norway	38	Norway	2–1	2–1	Friendly
10	7 June 2024	Untersberg-Arena, Grödig, Austria	40	Malta	1–0	7–1	Friendly
11	10 June 2024	Malšovická aréna, Hradec Králové, Czech Republic	41	North Macedonia	2–1	2–1	Friendly

== Honours ==
Slavia Prague

- Czech First League: 2016–17

Fiorentina

- Coppa Italia runner-up: 2022–23
- UEFA Europa Conference League runner-up: 2022–23

Czech Republic

- China Cup bronze: 2018
