= Giuseppe Pezzella =

Italian footballer

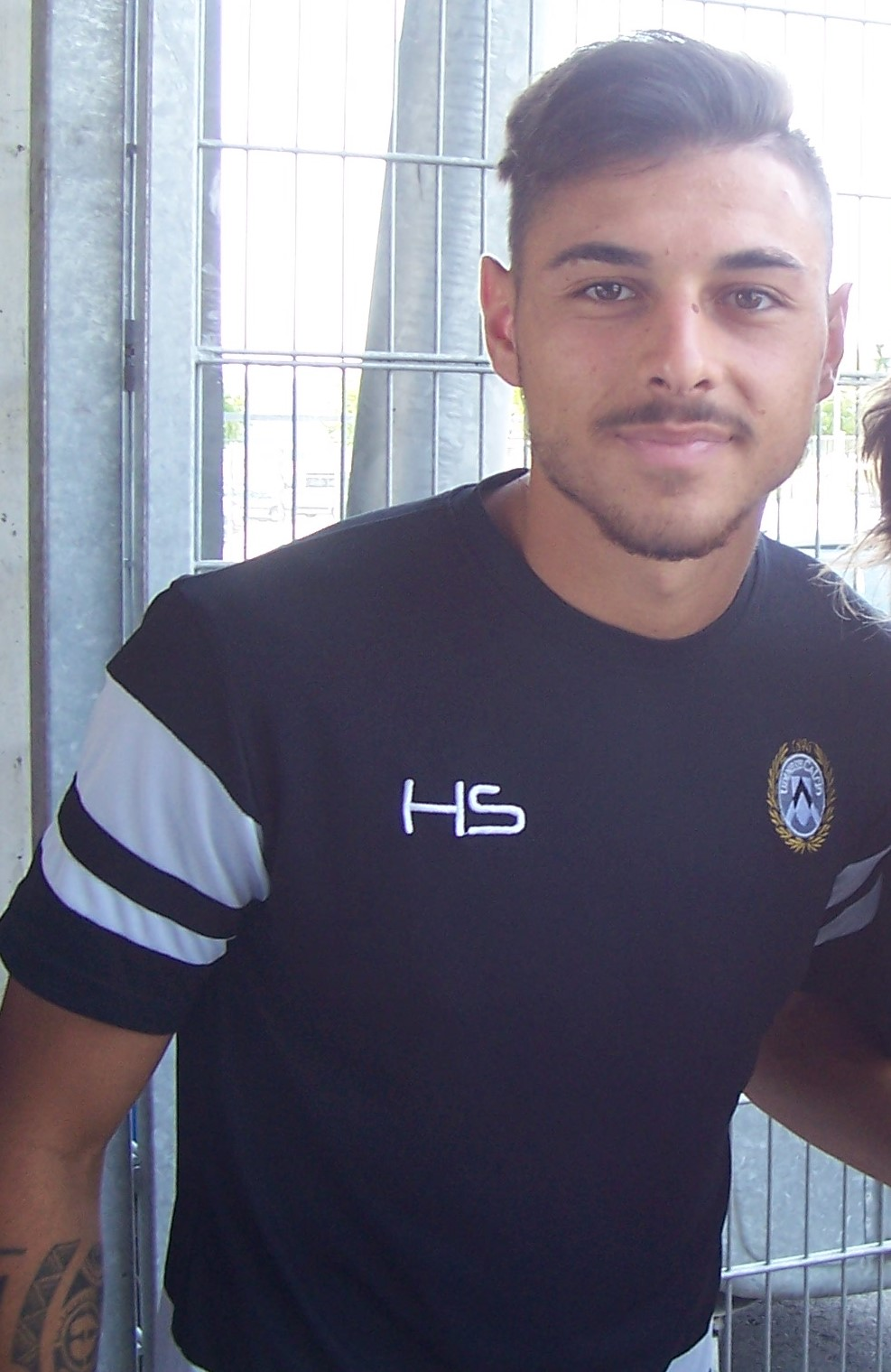
- Pezzella with Udinese in 2017

Personal information
- Date of birth: 29 November 1997 (age 28)
- Place of birth: Naples, Italy
- Height: 1.91 m (6 ft 3 in)
- Position: Left-back

Team information
- Current team: Cremonese
- Number: 3

Youth career
- Palermo

Senior career*
Years	Team	Apps	(Gls)
2015–2017	Palermo	19	(0)
2017–2020	Udinese	20	(0)
2019	→ Genoa (loan)	5	(0)
2019–2020	→ Parma (loan)	23	(0)
2020–2023	Parma	24	(1)
2021–2022	→ Atalanta (loan)	21	(0)
2022–2023	→ Lecce (loan)	16	(0)
2023–2025	Empoli	54	(0)
2025–	Cremonese	31	(0)

International career
2015–2016	Italy U19	7	(0)
2016–2017	Italy U20	8	(0)
2017–2019	Italy U21	14	(0)
Medal record
Men's football
Representing Italy
FIFA U-20 World Cup
Third place	2017 South Korea
UEFA European Under-19 Championship
Runner-up	2016 Germany
- * Club domestic league appearances and goals as of 25 May 2026

Giuseppe Pezzella (born 29 November 1997) is an Italian professional footballer who plays as a left-back for Serie B club Cremonese.

== Club career ==
=== Palermo ===
Pezzella is a youth product from Palermo. He made his Serie A debut with the senior side on 6 December 2015 against Atalanta, replacing Mato Jajalo after 65 minutes of a 3–0 away defeat.

=== Udinese ===
On 30 June 2017, Pezzella joined Udinese on a five-year contract.

==== Loan to Genoa ====
On 21 January 2019, Pezzella joined to Genoa on loan with an option to buy until 30 June 2019.

=== Parma ===
On 27 August 2019, Pezzella signed to Parma a five-year contract, but he was on loan until the end of 2019–20 season, with an obligation to buy.

==== Loan to Atalanta ====
On 27 July 2021, Pezzella moved to Atalanta on a season-long loan with option to buy, which would have become an obligation to buy if certain conditions were met.

==== Loan to Lecce ====
On 26 August 2022, Pezzella was loaned by Lecce, with an option to buy.

=== Empoli ===
On 31 July 2023, Serie A side Empoli announced the free signing of Pezzella on a three-year contract, with an option for a further year.

=== Cremonese ===
On 25 July 2025, Pezzella joined newly Serie A promoted club Cremonese, permanently for an estimated €2 million fee.

== International career ==
With the Italy U-20 side, Pezzella took part at the 2017 FIFA U-20 World Cup, winning the bronze medal. The same year, he was also called up by the Italy U-21 manager Luigi Di Biagio for the 2017 UEFA European Under-21 Championship, following Nicola Murru's injury, although he did not appear in the tournament. Italy were eliminated by Spain in the semi-finals of the competition on 27 June, following a 3–1 defeat.

Pezzella made his debut with the Italy U21 team on 1 September 2017, in a 3–0 friendly loss against Spain.

== Career statistics ==
=== Club ===
As of match played 25 May 2025

Appearances and goals by club, season and competition
Club	Season	League			Cup		Continental		Other		Total	
Club	Season	Division	Apps	Goals	Apps	Goals	Apps	Goals	Apps	Goals	Apps	Goals
Palermo	2015–16	Serie A	9	0	1	0	—		—		10	0
Palermo	2016–17	Serie A	10	0	1	0	—		—		11	0
Palermo	Total		19	0	2	0	—		—		21	0
Udinese	2017–18	Serie A	15	0	3	0	—		—		18	0
Udinese	2018–19	Serie A	4	0	1	0	—		—		5	0
Udinese	2019–20	Serie A	1	0	0	0	—		—		1	0
Udinese	Total		20	0	4	0	—		—		24	0
Genoa (loan)	2018–19	Serie A	12	0	0	0	—		—		12	0
Parma	2019–20	Serie A	23	0	2	0	—		—		25	0
Parma	2020–21	Serie A	24	1	0	0	—		—		24	1
Parma	Total		47	1	2	0	—		—		49	1
Atalanta (loan)	2021–22	Serie A	21	0	1	0	7 (Note: Three appearances in UEFA Champions League, four appearances in UEFA Europa League)	0	—		29	0
Lecce (loan)	2022–23	Serie A	16	0	0	0	—		—		16	0
Empoli	2023–24	Serie A	19	0	1	0	—		—		20	0
Empoli	2024–25	Serie A	35	0	4	0	—		—		39	0
Empoli	Total		54	0	5	0	—		—		59	0
Career total			189	1	14	0	7	0	0	0	210	1

== Honours ==
Italy U19

- UEFA European Under-19 Championship runner-up: 2016

Italy U20

- FIFA U-20 World Cup third place: 2017
