= Kevin Lasagna =

Italian footballer (born 1992)

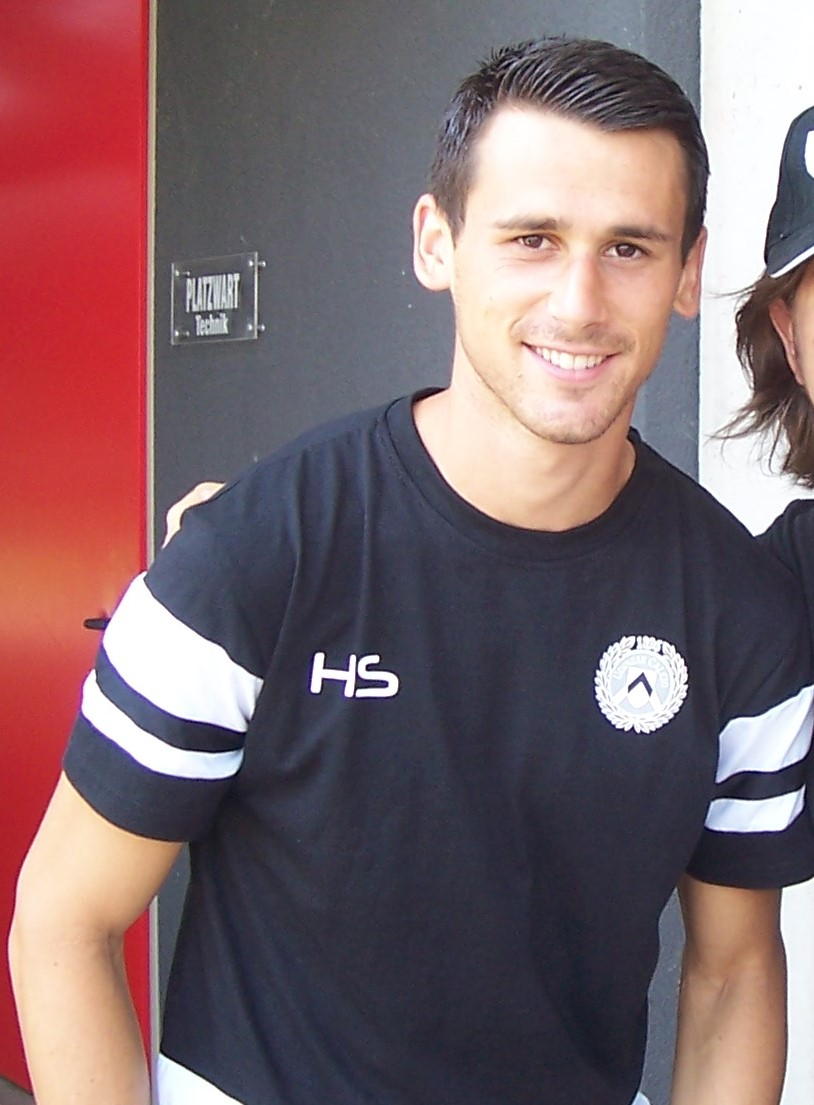
- Lasagna with Udinese in 2017

Personal information
- Full name: Kevin Lasagna
- Date of birth: 10 August 1992 (age 34)
- Place of birth: San Benedetto Po, Italy
- Height: 1.81 m (5 ft 11 in)
- Position: Striker

Team information
- Current team: Padova
- Number: 15

Youth career
- 1998–2005: Sambenedettina
- 2005–2009: Chievo
- 2009–2011: Suzzara

Senior career*
Years	Team	Apps	(Gls)
2011–2012	Governolese	32	(21)
2012–2014	Cerea	35	(7)
2013–2014	→ Este (loan)	33	(21)
2014–2017	Carpi	113	(24)
2017–2022	Udinese	118	(30)
2021–2022	→ Hellas Verona (loan)	47	(4)
2022–2025	Hellas Verona	26	(1)
2023–2024	→ Fatih Karagümrük (loan)	28	(2)
2024–2025	→ Bari (loan)	34	(7)
2025–	Padova	25	(6)

International career
2018–2020	Italy	7	(0)
- * Club domestic league appearances and goals as of 16:00, 13 May 2026 (UTC)

Kevin Lasagna (Italian pronunciation: [ˈkɛːvin laˈzaɲɲa]; born 10 August 1992) is an Italian professional footballer who plays as a striker for Serie B club Padova.

== Club career ==
=== Early career ===
Born in San Benedetto Po, Lasagna started his career with Governolese near his home town. In 2012, Lasagna signed for Serie D team Cerea and scored 7 times in 35 games throughout the 2012–13 season. Lasagna joined AC Este for the 2013–14 season and scored 21 times in 33 games making him one of the most sought after players of the lower leagues.

=== Carpi ===
In July 2014, Lasagna joined Serie B side Carpi. Lasagna made his Serie B debut on 13 September, as a substitute in the 1–1 draw against Crotone. On 15 November 2014, Lasagna scored his first Carpi goal, wrapping up a 5–2 win against Cittadella, to send Carpi to the top of Serie B.

In January 2017, it was announced that Lasagna would join Udinese for the 2017–18 season and finish the 2016–17 season with Carpi. Udinese reportedly paid Carpi a transfer fee of €4.5 million plus possible bonuses.

=== Udinese ===
Lasagna scored on his debut for Udinese, a 3–2 cup win against Frosinone on 12 August 2017. His first Serie A goal came on 17 September, in a 2–1 loss to Milan. In December, he scored in five consecutive league matches, becoming the first Udinese player to do so since Antonio Di Natale in 2010. He concluded his first season with 14 goals in 32 appearances.

Lasagna was named club captain in 2019, following the departure of previous captain Valon Behrami from the team. In December 2020, he was replaced in that role by Rodrigo De Paul.

=== Verona ===
On 26 January 2021, Lasagna joined Hellas Verona on a one-and-a-half-year loan deal containing a conditional obligation to buy based on his performances.

==== Loan to Fatih Karagümrük ====
On 15 August 2023, Lasagna moved on a season-long loan to Fatih Karagümrük in Turkey.

==== Loan to Bari ====
On 19 July 2024, Lasagna joined Bari on loan with a conditional obligation to buy.

=== Padova ===
On 21 August 2025, Lasagna signed with Padova in Serie B for two seasons.

== International career ==
On 9 October 2018, Lasagna was called to the Italy senior team by manager Roberto Mancini as a replacement for the injured Simone Zaza, for the upcoming UEFA Nations League match against Poland on 14 October. He made his senior international debut during the match, coming on as a late substitute in the eventual 1–0 away win, and set up Cristiano Biraghi's injury time winner with a header following a corner, which secured Italy's safety in the group. He made his first start for Italy on 20 November, in a 1–0 friendly win over the United States, held in Genk.

== Style of play ==
As a left-footed forward, Lasagna's natural role is that of a main striker in the centre. He is also capable of playing as a second striker or a left winger in an attacking trident. His best qualities are his pace, ball control when dribbling at speed, physical strength, and offensive movement, all of which enable him to lose markers and attack spaces from behind with runs both on and off the ball. He is also known for his striking ability across goal with his left foot while on the run.

== Career statistics ==
=== Club ===
As of match played 21 April 2023

Appearances and goals by club, season, and competition
Club	Season	League			Coppa Italia		Total	
Club	Season	Division	Apps	Goals	Apps	Goals	Apps	Goals
Governolese	2011–12	Eccellenza	32	21	—		32	21
Cerea	2012–13	Serie D	35	7	0	0	35	7
Este	2013–14	Serie D	33	21	0	0	33	21
Carpi	2014–15	Serie B	30	5	0	0	30	5
Carpi	2015–16	Serie A	36	5	3	0	39	5
Carpi	2016–17	Serie B	47	14	0	0	47	14
Carpi	Total		113	24	3	0	116	24
Udinese	2017–18	Serie A	29	12	3	2	32	14
Udinese	2018–19	Serie A	36	6	1	0	37	6
Udinese	2019–20	Serie A	36	10	3	2	39	12
Udinese	2020–21	Serie A	17	2	1	0	18	2
Udinese	Total		118	30	8	4	126	34
Hellas Verona (loan)	2020–21	Serie A	19	2	—		19	2
Hellas Verona (loan)	2021–22	Serie A	28	2	1	0	29	2
Hellas Verona (loan)	Total		47	4	1	0	48	4
Hellas Verona	2022–23	Serie A	26	1	1	1	27	2
Career total			404	108	13	5	417	113

=== International ===
As of match played 18 November 2020

National team	Year	Apps	Goals
Italy	2018	3	0
Italy	2019	1	0
Italy	2020	3	0
Total		7	0

== Honours ==
Carpi

- Serie B: 2014–15
