= Jakub Jankto =

Czech footballer (born 1996)

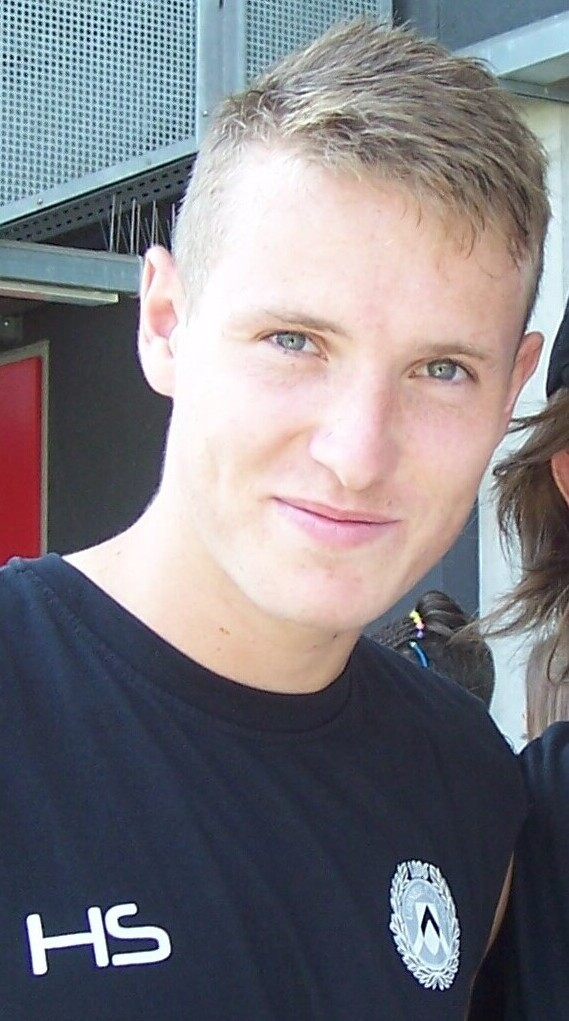
- Jankto with Udinese in 2017

Personal information
- Full name: Jakub Jankto
- Date of birth: 19 January 1996 (age 30)
- Place of birth: Prague, Czech Republic
- Height: 1.85 m (6 ft 1 in)
- Positions: Midfielder; full-back

Youth career
- 2002–2014: Slavia Prague
- 2014–2015: Udinese

Senior career*
Years	Team	Apps	(Gls)
2015–2019	Udinese	65	(9)
2015–2016	→ Ascoli (loan)	34	(5)
2018–2019	→ Sampdoria (loan)	25	(0)
2019–2021	Sampdoria	65	(8)
2021–2023	Getafe	14	(0)
2022–2023	→ Sparta Prague (loan)	15	(1)
2023–2025	Cagliari	18	(1)
Total		236	(24)

International career
2012	Czech Republic U17	2	(0)
2014	Czech Republic U18	7	(8)
2014–2015	Czech Republic U19	6	(0)
2015	Czech Republic U20	4	(1)
2016–2017	Czech Republic U21	7	(3)
2017–2022	Czech Republic	45	(4)
- * Club domestic league appearances and goals

Jakub Jankto (pronounced [ˈjakup ˈjaŋkto]; born 19 January 1996) is a Czech former professional footballer. A versatile player, he could play as a full-back, left midfielder or left winger.

Jankto garnered attention when he announced that he came out as gay in a social media post in 2023, making him the first active male international footballer to come out as gay.

== Club career ==
Jankto signed for Udinese from Slavia Prague in 2014 for a reported fee of €700,000. Without making his league debut for the team, he went on loan to Serie B side Ascoli in 2015, debuting on 15 September in a Serie B 1–0 home win against Virtus Entella.

On 6 July 2018, Sampdoria announced that Jankto had joined the club on an initial loan deal with an obligation to make the transfer permanent for €15 million. On 12 August, Jankto scored on his debut for Sampdoria in a 1–0 Coppa Italia win against Viterbese. Sampdoria later made the transfer permanent.

On 20 August 2021, Jankto signed a two-year contract with La Liga club Getafe CF. The following year on 10 August, he returned to his homeland after joining Sparta Prague on a one-year loan deal.

On 15 July 2023, Jankto signed a two-year contract with Serie A club Cagliari, with an option to extend for a further year. He made his debut for Cagliari on 21 August 2023 in a goalless draw against Torino. On 3 March 2024, he scored his first goal for Cagliari in a 1–0 victory against Empoli.

On 21 August 2025, Jankto announced on his Instagram that he had retired due to persistent health problems. He also referred to "wanting to spend more time with his son" as one of the reasons for his retirement.

== International career ==
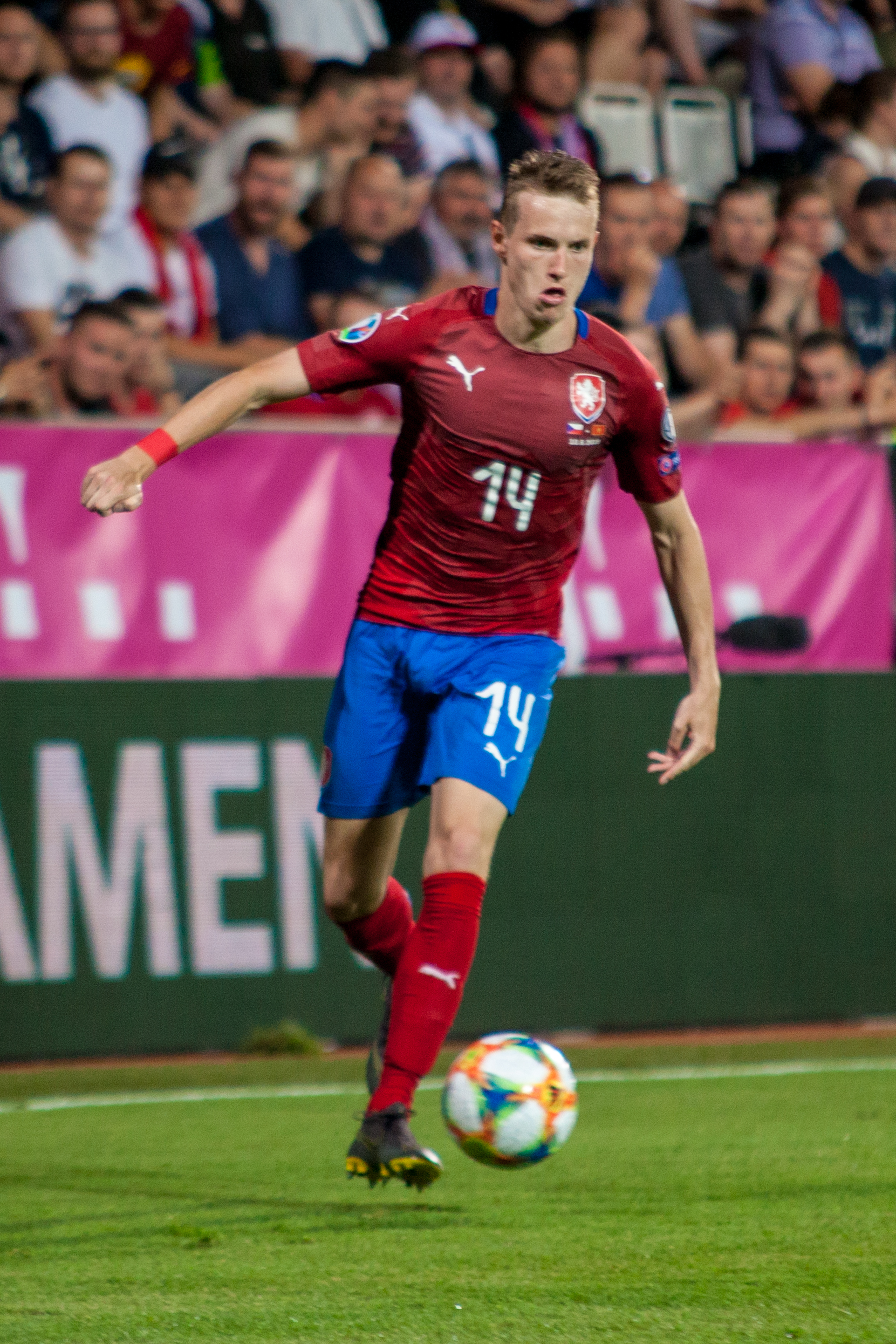
Jankto playing for the Czech Republic in 2019

In March 2017, Jankto received his first call-up by coach Karel Jarolím to the Czech senior squad for two matches against Lithuania (friendly) and San Marino (2018 FIFA World Cup qualification). The same year on 22 March, he debuted against the former opponent with his first goal that ended in a 3–0 victory.

== Personal life ==
Jankto was in a relationship with model Markéta Ottomanská and had a son. They separated in 2021.

On 13 February 2023, Jankto publicly came out as gay in a social media statement, becoming the first active senior international men's footballer to do so. Jankto's move received support from football clubs, footballers and other athletes.

On 18 April 2023, Jankto was stopped by police near the Sparta Prague Strahov training center. He submitted to a breath test behind the wheel of his vehicle, but refused to take a drug test and a medical examination. He also drove without a driver's licence, which had been taken away by the authorities earlier in 2023. In response, club management initiated a meeting with Jankto, and it was decided that he would not participate in training sessions with the first team.

== Career statistics ==
=== Club ===
Appearances and goals by club, season and competition
Club	Season	League			National cup (Note: Includes Coppa Italia, Copa del Rey, Czech Cup)		Total	
Club	Season	Division	Apps	Goals	Apps	Goals	Apps	Goals
Ascoli (loan)	2015–16	Serie B	34	5	1	0	35	5
Udinese	2016–17	Serie A	29	5	1	0	30	5
Udinese	2017–18	Serie A	36	4	3	2	39	6
Udinese	Total		65	9	4	2	69	11
Sampdoria (loan)	2018–19	Serie A	25	0	3	1	28	1
Sampdoria	2019–20	Serie A	30	2	1	0	31	2
Sampdoria	2020–21	Serie A	35	6	2	0	37	6
Sampdoria	2021–22	Serie A	0	0	1	0	1	0
Sampdoria	Total		65	8	4	0	69	8
Getafe	2021–22	La Liga	14	0	1	0	15	0
Sparta Prague (loan)	2022–23	Czech First League	15	1	1	0	16	1
Cagliari	2023–24	Serie A	18	1	2	0	20	1
Career total			236	24	16	3	252	27

=== International ===
Appearances and goals by national team and year
National team	Year	Apps	Goals
Czech Republic	2017	10	1
Czech Republic	2018	7	1
Czech Republic	2019	9	1
Czech Republic	2020	4	0
Czech Republic	2021	11	1
Czech Republic	2022	4	0
Total		45	4

Scores and results list Czech Republic's goal tally first, score column indicates score after each Jankto goal.

List of international goals scored by Jakub Jankto
No.	Date	Venue	Opponent	Score	Result	Competition
1	22 March 2017	Městský stadion, Ústí nad Labem, Czech Republic	Lithuania	2–0	3–0	Friendly
2	15 November 2018	Stadion Energa Gdańsk, Gdańsk, Poland	Poland	1–0	1–0	Friendly
3	10 June 2019	Andrův stadion, Olomouc, Czech Republic	Montenegro	1–0	3–0	UEFA Euro 2020 qualification
4	24 March 2021	Arena Lublin, Lublin, Poland	Estonia	6–1	6–2	2022 FIFA World Cup qualification

== Honours ==
Sparta Prague

- Czech First League: 2022–23
