= Davide Borsellini =

Italian footballer (born 1999)

Personal information
- Date of birth: 4 January 1999 (age 27)
- Place of birth: Rome, Italy
- Height: 1.88 m (6 ft 2 in)
- Position: Goalkeeper

Team information
- Current team: Rilindja
- Number: 99

Youth career
- Paganese

Senior career*
Years	Team	Apps	(Gls)
2016–2017	Paganese	4	(0)
2016–2017	→ Udinese (loan)	0	(0)
2017–2018	Udinese	0	(0)
2018–2020	Rende	24	(0)
2020–2022	Viterbese	0	(0)
2021	→ Lecco (loan)	3	(0)
2023	Notaresco	1	(0)
2024	Fushë Kosova	16	(0)
2024	Feronikeli	10	(0)
2025–	Rilindja		
- * Club domestic league appearances and goals as of 27 October 2026

Davide Borsellini (born 4 January 1999) is an Italian professional footballer who plays as a goalkeeper for Kosovan club Rilindja.

== Club career ==
Borsellini made his professional debut in the Lega Pro for Paganese on 16 January 2016 in a game against Foggia.

He was included in the Udinese's Serie A squad for the first time on 5 February 2017, when he was an unused backup for Orestis Karnezis in a game against Chievo.

On 7 August 2018, Borsellino signed with Serie C club Rende on a 2-year contract.

On 5 October 2020 he joined Viterbese on a two-year contract. On 1 February 2021, he was loaned to Lecco.
