= Bram Nuytinck =

Dutch footballer (born 1990)

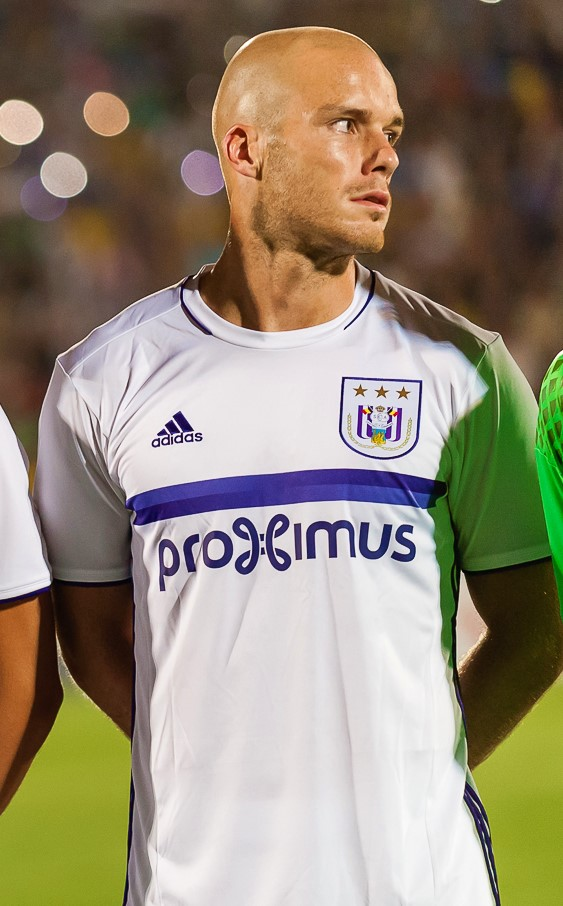
- Nuytinck with Anderlecht in 2016

Personal information
- Date of birth: 4 May 1990 (age 36)
- Place of birth: Heumen, Netherlands
- Height: 1.91 m (6 ft 3 in)
- Position: Centre-back

Team information
- Current team: NEC
- Number: 17

Youth career
- 1998–2001: Juliana '31
- 2001–2009: NEC

Senior career*
Years	Team	Apps	(Gls)
2009–2012	NEC	73	(7)
2012–2017	Anderlecht	157	(5)
2017–2022	Udinese	127	(3)
2023	Sampdoria	19	(0)
2023–	NEC	67	(1)

International career
2010–2013	Netherlands U21	23	(2)
- * Club domestic league appearances and goals as of 20 September 2026

Bram Nuytinck (born 4 May 1990) is a Dutch professional footballer who plays as a centre-back for Eredivisie club NEC.

== Club career ==
=== Early career ===
Born in Heumen, Gelderland, Nuytinck started playing football as an eight-year old for amateur club Juliana '31. In 2001, he was picked up by NEC, and joined their youth teams.

=== NEC ===
In the Spring of 2009, Nuytinck became part of the first team of NEC, where Mario Been was head coach. He signed a two-year contract with the club.

On 23 December 2009, Nuytinck made his first team debut under new coach Wiljan Vloet in a cup match against FC Groningen. He was substituted in the 53d minute, and came onto the pitch for Patrick Pothuizen. His first match in the starting lineup was on 30 January 2010 against Sparta Rotterdam. Two weeks later, on 12 February 2010, Nuytinck scored twice against NAC Breda, helping his team to win 4–2.

In January 2011, Nuytinck rejected an offer from Spanish club Osasuna, to keep developing as a player at NEC. In the spring of 2012, Napoli, Juventus, Ajax and Everton showed interest in Nuytinck who had grown in profile in the Eredivisie and captained the Dutch under-21 team.

=== Anderlecht ===
On 31 August 2012, Nuytinck signed with Anderlecht. He made his debut in the UEFA Champions League for Anderlecht. During his first two years in the club he grew into a regular, winning the Belgian First Division A both years. After his coach, fellow Dutchman John van den Brom, was sacked in 2014, Nuytinck saw himself play less as Olivier Deschacht was preferred in the centre of defense. The following year, during the 2016–17 season, Nuytinck was a regular in the starting lineup again, as Anderlecht finished first in the league.

=== Udinese ===
On 29 July 2017, Nuytinck signed for Italian team Udinese on a four-year contract. On 27 August, in his second appearance for the club, he scored his first goal in the Serie A in a 3–2 loss at SPAL.

On 26 September 2018, Nuytinck scored with a bicycle kick in a 2–1 loss to Lazio.

Nuytinck made 143 appearances for Udinese through six seasons, in which he scored three goals and assisted four.

=== Sampdoria ===
Nuytinck joined Sampdoria on a free transfer on 2 January 2023, signing a six-month contract.

=== Return to NEC ===
In June 2023, it was announced that Nuytinck had signed a contract to return to his former club NEC following the expiration of his Sampdoria contract.

== Career statistics ==
=== Club ===
As of match played 20 September 2026

Appearances and goals by club, season and competition
Club	Season	League			National cup		Europe		Other		Total	
Club	Season	Division	Apps	Goals	Apps	Goals	Apps	Goals	Apps	Goals	Apps	Goals
NEC	2009–10	Eredivisie	13	2	1	0	—		—		14	2
NEC	2010–11	Eredivisie	33	2	0	0	—		—		33	2
NEC	2011–12	Eredivisie	25	2	2	0	—		2 (Note: Appearances in Eredivisie play-offs)	0	29	2
NEC	2012–13	Eredivisie	2	1	0	0	—		—		2	1
NEC	Total		73	7	3	0	—		2	0	78	7
Anderlecht	2012–13	Belgian Pro League	33	1	6	0	5 (Note: Appearances in UEFA Champions League)	0	—		44	1
Anderlecht	2013–14	Belgian Pro League	23	1	2	0	5	0	1 (Note: Appearances in Belgian Super Cup)	0	31	1
Anderlecht	2014–15	Belgian Pro League	11	0	1	0	2	0	1	0	15	0
Anderlecht	2015–16	Belgian Pro League	18	2	2	0	4 (Note: Appearances in UEFA Europa League)	0	—		24	2
Anderlecht	2016–17	Belgian Pro League	30	1	2	0	12 (Note: Two appearances in UEFA Champions League and ten in UEFA Europa League)	0	—		44	1
Anderlecht	Total		115	5	13	0	28	0	2	0	158	5
Udinese	2017–18	Serie A	27	1	3	0	—		—		30	1
Udinese	2018–19	Serie A	27	0	0	0	—		—		27	0
Udinese	2019–20	Serie A	26	0	2	0	—		—		28	0
Udinese	2020–21	Serie A	20	1	1	0	—		—		21	1
Udinese	2021–22	Serie A	27	1	2	0	—		—		29	1
Udinese	2022–23	Serie A	6	0	2	0	—		—		8	0
Udinese	Total		133	3	10	0	0	0	0	0	143	3
Sampdoria	2022–23	Serie A	19	0	0	0	—		—		19	0
NEC	2023–24	Eredivisie	30	0	4	0	—		1	0	35	0
NEC	2024–25	Eredivisie	25	1	1	0	—		—		26	1
NEC	2025–26	Eredivisie	7	0	1	0	—		—		8	0
NEC	2026–27	Eredivisie	5	0	0	0	3 (Note: Two appearances in UEFA Champions League, one appearance in UEFA Europa League)	0	—		8	0
NEC	Total		67	1	6	0	3	0	1	0	77	1
Career total			407	17	31	0	31	0	5	0	475	17

== Honours ==
Anderlecht

- Belgian Pro League: 2012–13, 2013–14, 2016–17
- Belgian Super Cup: 2013, 2014
