= Marco Di Bello =

Italian football referee

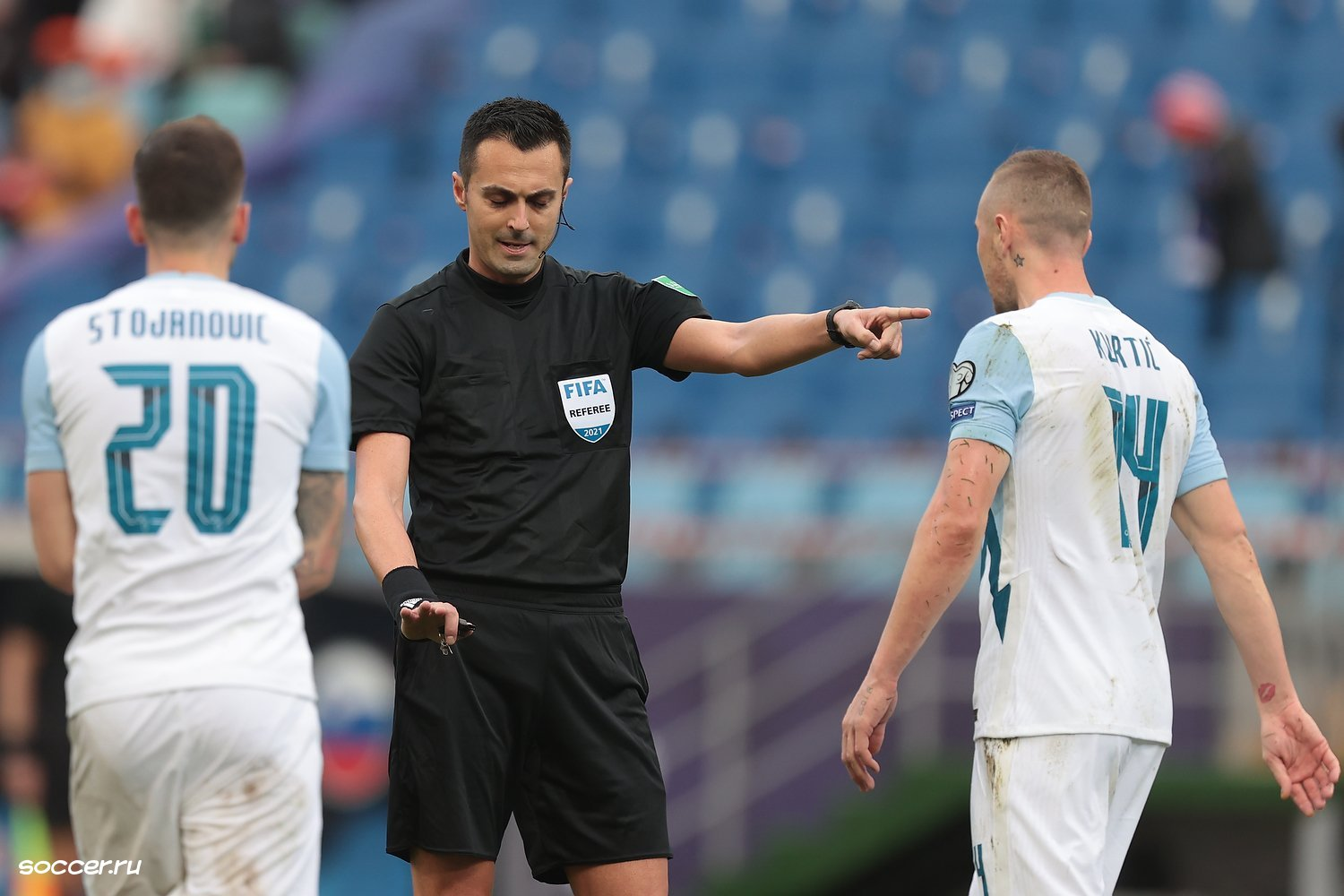
- Di Bello (center) in 2021
- Born: 12 August 1981 (age 45); Brindisi, Italy
- Other occupation: Banker

Domestic
Years	League	Role
2011–	Serie B	Referee
2012–	Serie A	Referee

International
Years	League	Role
2018–	FIFA listed	Referee

Marco Di Bello (born 12 July 1981) is an Italian football referee who officiates in Serie A. He has been a FIFA referee since 2018, and is ranked as a UEFA first category referee.

== Refereeing career ==
In 2011, Di Bello began officiating in Serie B, before being promoted to Serie A the following year. He officiated his first match in Serie A on 12 April 2012 between Bologna and Cagliari. In 2018, he was put on the FIFA referees list. He officiated his first UEFA competition match on 19 July 2018, a meeting between Israeli club Beitar Jerusalem and Georgian club Chikhura Sachkhere in the 2018–19 UEFA Europa League first qualifying round. He officiated his first senior international match on 11 June 2019 between Russia and Cyprus in UEFA Euro 2020 qualifying. On 9 June 2019, he served as the assistant video assistant referee for the third place play-off of the 2019 UEFA Nations League Finals between Switzerland and England. Later that year, he was appointed as a video assistant referee for the 2019 FIFA U-17 World Cup in Brazil.

On 21 April 2021, Di Bello was selected as a video assistant referee for UEFA Euro 2020, to be held across Europe in June and July 2021. After Lazio - AC Milan on 1/3/2024, he gifted 3 Lazio players a red card, and was banned for 1 month in the Serie A, after this disastrous game.

== Personal life ==
Di Bello was born in Brindisi, and works at a credit institution. He is married and has two children.
