= 2013–14 ACF Fiorentina season =

Fiorentina
2013–14 season
- President: Mario Cognigni
- Manager: Vincenzo Montella
- Stadium: Stadio Artemio Franchi
- Serie A: 4th
- Coppa Italia: Runners-up
- UEFA Europa League: Round of 16
- Top goalscorer: League: Giuseppe Rossi (16); All: Giuseppe Rossi (17)
- Highest home attendance: 40,912 vs Torino (18 May 2014, Serie A)
- Lowest home attendance: 12,486 vs Dnipro Dnipropetrovsk (12 December 2013, Europa League)
- Average home league attendance: 32,057
Home colours	Away colours	Third colours

The 2013–14 season was the 87th season in ACF Fiorentina's history, their 76th season in Serie A, and the ninth consecutive season since promotion from Serie B in 2004. Fiorentina competed in Serie A, in the 2013–14 edition in Coppa Italia, and, having earned qualification by finishing fourth in the 2012–13 Serie A, in the UEFA Europa League.

== Season review ==
The 2012–13 season was a drastic reversal of fortune from the 2011–12 season, in which Fiorentina was involved in a relegation battle. The club narrowly missed out on UEFA Champions League football, vying with Milan up until the last week of the season.

Fiorentina made its first foray into the 2013 summer transfer window merely days after the end of the 2012–13 Serie A by announcing the free transfer of Oleksandr Yakovenko on May 22. On May 31, it was announced that Marcos Alonso will be joining the club following the expiration of his contract at Bolton Wanderers. On June 12, Fiorentina announced that Spanish national Joaquín has agreed to sign on from Spanish club Málaga. Shortly after, the club stated that it will retain Juan Cuadrado after purchasing a 50% co-ownership rights from Udinese. On June 18, Fiorentina announced the signing of Gustavo Munúa, a goalkeeper, who transferred from La Liga club Levante. On June 13, Fiorentina and Torino reached an agreement regarding co-ownerships of Alessio Cerci (who will be fully owned by Torino) and Marko Bakić (will be fully owned by Fiorentina) with undisclosed fee.

Jersey kits for the upcoming season were presented in a ceremony on July 3, 2013, with a gray kit replacing the red and white third kit from last season. On July 4, the club announced the signing of Massimo Ambrosini on a free transfer following the expiration of his contract with Milan. On July 9, 2013, Parma announced the signing of Felipe from Fiorentina. The club sold Haris Seferovic to Real Sociedad on July 11. The next day on July 12, the club announced the transfer of Mario Gómez from Bayern Munich. On July 18, the club announced the sale of Stevan Jovetić to Manchester City. On July 23, the club announced the signing of Josip Iličić from Palermo.

On August 9, Fiorentina was drawn against Grasshopper Club Zürich for qualification into the group stage of the UEFA Europa League. Despite losing the 2nd leg at home 1–0, Fiorentina advanced to the Europa League group stage based on away goals after winning the leg at Zürich 2–1.

== Players ==
=== Squad information ===
Last updated on 18 May 2014
Appearances include league matches only

No.	Name	Nat	Position(s)	Date of birth (Age at end of season)	Signed from	Signed in	Contract ends	Apps.	Goals
Goalkeepers
1	Neto	(Brazil)	GK	July 19, 1989 (aged 24)	(Brazil) Atlético Paranaense	2011	2015	43	0
12	Cristiano Lupatelli	(Italy)	GK	June 21, 1978 (aged 36)	(Italy) Genoa	2012	2014	1	0
24	Luca Lezzerini	(Italy)	GK	March 24, 1995 (aged 19)	(Italy) Youth Sector	2011		0	0
25	Antonio Rosati	(Italy)	GK	June 26, 1983 (aged 31)	(Italy) Napoli	2013	2014	3	0
Defenders
2	Gonzalo Rodríguez	(Argentina)	CB	April 10, 1984 (aged 30)	(Spain) Villarreal	2012	2015	68	10
3	Modibo Diakité	(France)	CB	March 2, 1987 (aged 27)	(England) Sunderland	2014	2014	9	0
4	Facundo Roncaglia	(Argentina)	CB / RB	February 10, 1987 (aged 27)	(Argentina) Boca Juniors	2012	2016	37	3
5	Marvin Compper	(Germany)	CB / LB	June 14, 1985 (aged 29)	(Germany) 1899 Hoffenheim	2013	2015	16	0
6	Ahmed Hegazi	(Egypt)	CB	January 25, 1991 (aged 23)	(Egypt) Ismaily	2012	2016	3	0
15	Stefan Savić	(Montenegro)	CB / RB	January 8, 1991 (aged 23)	(England) Manchester City	2012	2016	57	2
23	Manuel Pasqual (Captain)	(Italy)	LB / LM	March 13, 1982 (aged 32)	(Italy) Arezzo	2005	2014	265	5
40	Nenad Tomović	(Serbia)	CB / LB / RB	August 30, 1987 (aged 26)	(Italy) Genoa	2012		51	0
Midfielders
7	David Pizarro	(Chile)	CM / DM	September 11, 1979 (aged 34)	(Italy) Roma	2012	2014	57	4
8	Marko Bakić	(Montenegro)	AM / CM	November 1, 1993 (aged 20)	(Italy) Torino	2013	2017	3	0
10	Alberto Aquilani	(Italy)	CM / DM / AM	July 7, 1984 (aged 29)	(England) Liverpool	2012	2015	56	13
11	Juan Cuadrado	(Colombia)	RW / AM	May 26, 1988 (aged 26)	(Italy) Udinese	2012	2017	68	16
14	Matías Fernández	(Chile)	AM / CM	May 15, 1986 (aged 28)	(Portugal) Sporting CP	2012	2015	45	4
17	Joaquín	(Spain)	RW / AM / LW	July 21, 1981 (aged 32)	(Spain) Málaga	2013	2016	26	2
20	Borja Valero	(Spain)	CM / DM / AM	January 12, 1985 (aged 29)	(Spain) Villarreal	2012	2016	69	7
21	Massimo Ambrosini	(Italy)	DM / CM	May 29, 1977 (aged 37)	(Italy) Milan	2013	2014	21	0
27	Rafał Wolski	(Poland)	AM / LW / RW	November 10, 1992 (aged 21)	(Poland) Legia Warsaw	2013	2017	15	1
31	Leonardo Capezzi	(Italy)	CM	March 28, 1995 (aged 19)	(Italy) Youth Sector	2012		0	0
66	Juan Manuel Vargas	(Peru)	LW / LB / LM	October 5, 1983 (aged 30)	(Italy) Catania	2008	2014	128	16
72	Josip Iličić	(Slovenia)	AM / RW / SS	January 29, 1988 (aged 26)	(Italy) Palermo	2013	2017	21	3
88	Anderson	(Brazil)	CM / DM	April 13, 1988 (aged 26)	(England) Manchester United	2014	2014	7	0
Forwards
9	Ante Rebić	(Croatia)	ST / LW	September 21, 1993 (aged 20)	(Croatia) RNK Split	2013	2018	4	1
30	Ryder Matos	(Brazil)	ST / LW / RW	November 10, 1992 (aged 21)	(Brazil) Vitória	2011		23	0
32	Alessandro Matri	(Italy)	CF / ST	August 19, 1984 (aged 29)	(Italy) Milan	2014	2014	15	4
33	Mario Gómez	(Germany)	CF / ST	July 10, 1985 (aged 28)	(Germany) Bayern Munich	2013	2017	9	3
49	Giuseppe Rossi	(Italy)	ST / SS	February 1, 1987 (aged 27)	(Spain) Villarreal	2013	2017	22	16
Players transferred during the season
3	Marcos Alonso	(Spain)	LB / LM	December 28, 1990 (aged 23)	(England) Bolton Wanderers	2013	2016	3	0
18	Matías Vecino	(Uruguay)	AM / CM	August 24, 1991 (aged 22)	(Uruguay) Nacional	2013	2016	6	0
22	Adem Ljajić	(Serbia)	LW / RW / SS / AM	29 September 1991 (aged 21)	(Serbia) Partizan	2010		78	15
77	Oleksandr Yakovenko	(Ukraine)	LW / RW / ST	July 23, 1987 (aged 26)	(Belgium) Anderlecht	2013	2016	3	0
78	Gustavo Munúa	(Uruguay)	GK	January 27, 1978 (aged 36)	(Spain) Levante	2013	2015	0	0
83	Rubén Olivera	(Uruguay)	AM / CM / RW / LW	May 4, 1983 (aged 31)	(Italy) Lecce	2012	2014	14	0

=== Fiorentina Primavera ===
As of 27 May 2013

Squad number indicates first team number. Note: Flags indicate national team as defined under FIFA eligibility rules; some limited exceptions apply. Players may hold more than one non-FIFA nationality.

No.	Pos.	Nation	Player
—	GK	(Italy) ITA	Ahmed Ziwan
41	GK	(Italy) ITA	Luca Lezzerini
—	DF	(Brazil) BRA	Alan Empereur (c)
—	DF	(Italy) ITA	Samuele Folla
32	DF	(Italy) ITA	Saverio Madrigali
—	DF	(Italy) ITA	Matteo Spinelli
38	DF	(Ghana) GHA	Nii Nortey Ashong
—	DF	(Italy) ITA	Alessio Cola
—	DF	(Italy) ITA	Roberto Everton
—	DF	(Italy) ITA	Lorenzo Venuti
—	MF	(Italy) ITA	Michele Fossati
28	MF	(Italy) ITA	Leonardo Capezzi

No.	Pos.	Nation	Player
—	MF	(Italy) ITA	Leonardo Costanzo
—	MF	(Italy) ITA	Alberto Rosa Gestaldo
—	MF	(Republic of the Congo) CGO	Luzayadio Bangu
29	MF	(Italy) ITA	Federico Bernardeschi
—	MF	(Italy) ITA	Filippo Bandinelli
—	MF	(Italy) ITA	Nicolò Fazzi
—	MF	(Italy) ITA	Axel Gulin
—	FW	(Brazil) BRA	Da Silva
33	FW	(Denmark) DEN	Kenneth Zohore
—	FW	(Italy) ITA	Alberto de Poli
—	MF	(Italy) ITA	Rocco Giordano
—	FW	(Ivory Coast) CIV	Diomandè Yann Gondo

== Transfers ==
=== In ===
No.	Pos.	Nat.	Name	Age	EU	Moving from	Type	Transfer window	Ends	Transfer fee	Source
	MF	(Ukraine)	Oleksandr Yakovenko	25	Non-EU	Anderlecht (Belgium)	Transfer	Summer	2016	Free	Fiorentina
	DF	(Spain)	Marcos Alonso	22	EU	Bolton Wanderers (England)	Transfer	Summer	2016	Free	Fiorentina
	MF	(Spain)	Joaquín	31	EU	Málaga (Spain)	Transfer	Summer	2016	€2m	Fiorentina
	MF	(Colombia)	Juan Cuadrado	25	EU	Udinese	Co-Ownership	Summer	2014	Undisclosed	Fiorentina
	GK	(Uruguay)	Gustavo Munúa	35	EU	Levante (Spain)	Transfer	Summer	2015	Free	Fiorentina
	MF	(Montenegro)	Marko Bakić	19	Non-EU	Torino	Transfer	Summer		Undisclosed	Fiorentina
	MF	(Italy)	Massimo Ambrosini	36	EU	Milan	Transfer	Summer	2014	Free	Fiorentina
33	FW	(Germany)	Mario Gómez	28	EU	Bayern Munich (Germany)	Transfer	Summer	2017	€20m	Fiorentina
72	MF	(Slovenia)	Josip Iličić	25	EU	Palermo	Transfer	Summer		€9m	Fiorentina
	FW	(Croatia)	Ante Rebić	19	EU	RNK Split	Transfer	Summer	2017	Undisclosed	Fiorentina
18	MF	(Uruguay)	Matías Vecino	21	Non-EU	Nacional	Transfer	Summer	2016	€2.2m	
88	MF	(Brazil)	Anderson	25	Non-EU	Manchester United (England)	Loan	Winter	2014	Free	
32	FW	(Italy)	Alessandro Matri	29	EU	Milan	Loan	Winter	2014	Free	Fiorentina
	CB	(France)	Modibo Diakité	26		Sunderland (England)	Loan	Winter	2014	Free	Fiorentina

=== Out ===
N	Pos.	Nat.	Name	Age	EU	Moving to	Type	Transfer window	Transfer fee	Source
	FW	(Italy)	Alessio Cerci	25	EU	Torino	Transfer	Summer	€4.5M	Fiorentina
	DF	(Brazil)	Felipe	28	EU	Parma	Transfer	Summer	Undisclosed	
	FW	(Switzerland)	Haris Seferovic	21	EU	Real Sociedad (Spain)	Transfer	Summer	€2.3M	Fiorentina
	FW	(Montenegro)	Stevan Jovetić	23	Non-EU	Manchester City (England)	Transfer	Summer	€30M	Fiorentina
	FW	(Serbia)	Adem Ljajić	21	Non-EU	Roma	Transfer	Summer	€10M	Fiorentina
28	DF	(Spain)	Marcos Alonso	23	EU	Sunderland (England)	Loan	Winter	Undisclosed	
83	MF	(Uruguay)	Rubén Olivera	30		Brescia	Transfer	Winter	Undisclosed	
77	FW	(Ukraine)	Oleksandr Yakovenko	26	Non-EU	Málaga (Spain)	Loan	Winter	Undisclosed	

EU = if holds or not a European Union passport; Country: when 2 flags, 1st flag = country that plays for internationally, 2nd flag = country of birth; N = number on jersey; P = Position (for position name, pause mouse pointer on abbreviation); Name = Name on jersey (for more extensive name, pause mouse pointer on name); Age = age on the day of the signing; Moving from = only indicate the club the player was playing before start playing for this club in this season, for the type of the moving see Status column; Moving to = only indicates the club the player is going to play next, for the type of the moving see Status column; Ends = when the player's current contract ends; n/a = Not applicable.

Larrondo, Llama, Migliaccio, Sissoko, and Viviano returned to their parent clubs after their loan periods expired on June 30, 2013. Luca Toni's contract expired on June 30, 2013, and he opted not to renew with the club.

== Competitions ==
=== Overall ===
Competition	Started round	Current position	Final position	First match	Last match
Serie A	Matchday 1	—	4th	26 August 2013	18 May 2014
Coppa Italia	Round of 16	—	Runners-up	8 January 2014	3 May 2014
Europa League	Play-off round	—	Round of 16	22 August 2013	20 March 2014

Last updated: 18 May 2014

=== Serie A ===
==== League table ====
Pos	Team	Pld	W	D	L	GF	GA	GD	Pts	Qualification or relegation
2	Roma	38	26	7	5	72	25	+47	85	Qualification for the Champions League group stage
3	Napoli	38	23	9	6	77	39	+38	78	Qualification for the Champions League play-off round
4	Fiorentina	38	19	8	11	65	44	+21	65	Qualification for the Europa League group stage (Note: Since the 2013–14 Coppa Italia champions Napoli and runners–up Fiorentina qualified for the 2014–15 European football season thus 4th, 5th and 6th in Serie A (barring any failure to receive a "UEFA licence" from the FIGC or a ban from European competition) would qualify for group stage, play-off round and third qualifying round respectively.)
5	Internazionale	38	15	15	8	62	39	+23	60	Qualification for the Europa League play-off round
6	Parma	38	15	13	10	58	46	+12	58	

Source: Serie A, Soccerway
Rules for classification: 1st points; 2nd head-to-head points; 3rd head-to-head goal difference; 4th goal difference; 5th number of goals scored; 6th public draw.
(Head-to-head record is applied for clubs with the same number of points only once all matches between said clubs have been played)

==== Results summary ====
Overall								Home						Away					
Pld	W	D	L	GF	GA	GD	Pts	W	D	L	GF	GA	GD	W	D	L	GF	GA	GD
38	19	8	11	65	44	+21	65	9	4	6	36	29	+7	10	4	5	29	15	+14

Last updated: 18 May 2014.
Source: Competitive matches

==== Results by round ====
Round	1	2	3	4	5	6	7	8	9	10	11	12	13	14	15	16	17	18	19	20	21	22	23	24	25	26	27	28	29	30	31	32	33	34	35	36	37	38
Ground	H	A	H	A	A	H	A	H	A	H	A	H	A	H	A	H	A	H	A	A	H	A	H	H	A	H	A	H	A	H	A	H	A	H	A	H	A	H
Result	W	W	D	W	L	D	D	W	W	L	W	W	L	W	L	W	W	W	D	W	D	L	W	L	D	L	L	W	W	L	D	W	W	L	W	L	W	D
Position	6	4	4	4	5	5	6	6	5	6	6	5	5	5	5	4	4	4	4	4	4	4	4	4	4	4	4	4	4	4	4	4	4	4	4	4	4	4

Updated to match(es) played on 18 May 2014. Source: Competitive matches
A = Away; H = Home; W = Win; D = Draw; L = Loss

==== Matches ====
26 August 2013 1	Fiorentina	2–1	Catania	Florence
20:45 CEST (UTC+02:00)	Rossi 14'; Gómez (yellow card) 16'; Pizarro 28', (yellow card) 73'	Report	Barrientos 22', (yellow card) 34'; Spolli (yellow card) 45+1'; Álvarez (yellow card) 49'; Andújar (yellow card) 90+3'	Stadium: Stadio Artemio Franchi; Attendance: 32,845; Referee: Daniele Doveri

1 September 2013 2	Genoa	2–5	Fiorentina	Genoa
20:45 CEST (UTC+02:00)	Gilardino 54'; Lodi 60' (pen.); Manfredini (yellow card) 69'; Sampirisi (yellow card) 70' (yellow-red card) 90+3'	Report	Aquilani 10'; Rossi 14', 55'; Neto (yellow card) 36'; Gómez 41', 90+4' (pen.); Compper (yellow card) 59'	Stadium: Stadio Luigi Ferraris; Attendance: 21,000; Referee: Domenico Celi

15 September 2013 3	Fiorentina	1–1	Cagliari	Florence
12:30 CEST (UTC+02:00)	Gonzalo (yellow card) 16'; Valero 71'; Pizarro (red card) 90+2'	Report	Cossu (yellow card) 58'; Agazzi (yellow card) 60'; Murru (yellow card) 82'; Pinilla 89'	Stadium: Stadio Artemio Franchi; Attendance: 31,690; Referee: Andrea De Marco

22 September 2013 4	Atalanta	0–2	Fiorentina	Bergamo
15:00 CEST (UTC+02:00)	Carmona (yellow card) 14'; Yepes (yellow card) 28'; Lucchini (yellow card) 72'	Report	Fernández 41'; Wolski (yellow card) 43'; Rossi 69'	Stadium: Stadio Atleti Azzurri d'Italia; Attendance: 13,362; Referee: Antonio Damato

26 September 2013 5	Internazionale	2–1	Fiorentina	Milan
20:45 CEST (UTC+02:00)	Ranocchia (yellow card) 43'; Juan Jesus (yellow card) 59'; Nagatomo (yellow card) 70'; Cambiasso 72'; Campagnaro (yellow card) 74'; Jonathan 83'	Report	Ambrosini (yellow card) 49'; Rossi 60' (pen.)	Stadium: San Siro; Attendance: 45,342; Referee: Paolo Valeri

30 September 2013 6	Fiorentina	2–2	Parma	Florence
20:45 CEST (UTC+02:00)	Aquilani (yellow card) 27'; Gonzalo 64', (yellow card) 69'; Pizarro (yellow card) 65'; Vargas 78'	Report	Marchionni (yellow card) 20'; Lucarelli (yellow card) 42'; Gargano 45+1'; Gobbi 90+2'	Stadium: Stadio Artemio Franchi; Attendance: 28,524; Referee: Davide Massa

6 October 2013 7	Lazio	0–0	Fiorentina	Rome
20:45 CEST (UTC+02:00)	Perea (yellow card) 32'; Ciani (yellow card) 47'; Cana (yellow card) 60'; Hernanes (yellow card) 63'	Report	Ambrosini (yellow card) 34'; Tomović (yellow card) 42'; Rossi (yellow card) 53'; Pasqual (yellow card) 90+4'	Stadium: Stadio Olimpico; Attendance: 30,562; Referee: Daniele Orsato

20 October 2013 8	Fiorentina	4–2	Juventus	Florence
15:00 CEST (UTC+02:00)	Aquilani (yellow card) 15'; Cuadrado (yellow card) 38'; Savić (yellow card) 57'; Rossi 66' (pen.), 76', 80'; Joaquín 78'	Report	Tevez (yellow card) 12', (goal) 37' (pen.); Barzagli (yellow card) 22'; Pogba 40'; Asamoah (yellow card) 65'; Pirlo (yellow card) 68'; Motta (yellow card) 87'; Bonucci (yellow card) 89'	Stadium: Stadio Artemio Franchi; Attendance: 38,290; Referee: Nicola Rizzoli

27 October 2013 9	Chievo	1–2	Fiorentina	Verona
15:00 CEST (UTC+02:00)	Cesar 13', (yellow card) 67'; Radovanović (yellow card) 43'; Sestu (yellow card) 72'; Hetemaj (yellow card) 90+5'	Report	Gonzalo (yellow card) 41'; Cuadrado (yellow card) 42', (goal) 45', 64'; Valero (yellow card) 90+4'	Stadium: Stadio Marc'Antonio Bentegodi; Attendance: 8,000; Referee: Luca Banti

30 October 2013 10	Fiorentina	1–2	Napoli	Florence
20:45 CET (UTC+01:00)	Rossi 28' (pen.); Cuadrado (yellow card) 54' (yellow-red card) 90+1'; Valero (yellow card) 63'; Compper (yellow card) 76'	Report	Callejón 12'; Pandev (yellow card) 22'; Maggio (yellow card) 27' (yellow-red card) 80'; Mertens 36'; Behrami (yellow card) 56'; Albiol (yellow card) 60'	Stadium: Stadio Artemio Franchi; Attendance: 34,482; Referee: Gianpaolo Calvarese

2 November 2013 11	Milan	0–2	Fiorentina	Milan
20:45 CET (UTC+01:00)	Balotelli (yellow card) 61'	Report	Vargas 27'; Matos (yellow card) 29'; Aquilani (yellow card) 50'; Valero 73'	Stadium: San Siro; Attendance: 44,261; Referee: Paolo Mazzoleni

10 November 2013 12	Fiorentina	2–1	Sampdoria	Florence
20:45 CET (UTC+01:00)	Rossi 11' (pen.), 17'	Report	Berardi (yellow card) 10'; Géntsoglou (yellow card) 51'; Mustafi (yellow card) 68'; Gabbiadini 74'; Éder (yellow card) 84'	Stadium: Stadio Artemio Franchi; Attendance: 28,305; Referee: Antonio Damato

24 November 2013 13	Udinese	1–0	Fiorentina	Udine
15:00 CET (UTC+01:00)	Danilo (yellow card) 18'; Heurtaux 34'; Fernandes (yellow card) 88'	Report	Aquilani (yellow card) 33'; Gonzalo (yellow card) 83'	Stadium: Stadio Friuli; Attendance: 14,318; Referee: Paolo Tagliavento

2 December 2013 14	Fiorentina	4–3	Hellas Verona	Florence
19:00 CET (UTC+01:00)	Valero 5', 14'; Ambrosini (yellow card) 31'; Vargas 43'; Fernández (yellow card) 49'; Rossi 54' (pen.)	Report	Rômulo 6', (yellow card) 41'; Iturbe 13'; Janković (yellow card) 16' (red card) 53'; Jorginho 72'; Cacciatore (yellow card) 76'	Stadium: Stadio Artemio Franchi; Attendance: 33,976; Referee: Daniele Doveri

8 December 2013 15	Roma	2–1	Fiorentina	Rome
12:30 CET (UTC+01:00)	Maicon 7'; Pjanić (yellow card) 22' (yellow-red card) 88'; De Sanctis (yellow card) 60'; Destro 67', (yellow card) 68'; Castán (yellow card) 69'	Report	Ambrosini (yellow card) 13'; Gonzalo (yellow card) 16'; Vargas 29'; Neto (yellow card) 63'; Cuadrado (yellow card) 90+3'	Stadium: Stadio Olimpico; Attendance: 48,318; Referee: Daniele Orsato

15 December 2013 16	Fiorentina	3–0	Bologna	Florence
15:00 CET (UTC+01:00)	Iličić 13'; Valero 30'; Cuadrado (yellow card) 52'; Rossi 64'; Rebić (yellow card) 79'	Report	Diamanti (yellow card) 62'	Stadium: Stadio Artemio Franchi; Attendance: 29,600; Referee: Carmine Russo

22 December 2013 17	Sassuolo	0–1	Fiorentina	Reggio Emilia
15:00 CET (UTC+01:00)	Gazzola (yellow card) 14'; Marrone (yellow card) 18'; Longhi (yellow card) 37'; Pegolo (yellow card) 62'; Kurtić (yellow card) 75'	Report	Tomović (yellow card) 45+1'; Pasqual (yellow card) 66'; Compper (yellow card) 74'; Rossi 82'	Stadium: Mapei Stadium – Città del Tricolore; Attendance: 14,845; Referee: Marco Guida

5 January 2014 18	Fiorentina	1–0	Livorno	Florence
18:00 CET (UTC+01:00)	Iličić (yellow card) 21'; Aquilani (yellow card) 35'; Cuadrado (yellow card) 53'; Gonzalo 66', (yellow card) 81'	Report	Valentini (yellow card) 41'; Paulinho (yellow card) 45'; Rinaudo (yellow card) 69'; Luci (yellow card) 76'; Schiattarella (yellow card) 85'	Stadium: Stadio Artemio Franchi; Attendance: 32,106; Referee: Paolo Tagliavento

12 January 2014 19	Torino	0–0	Fiorentina	Turin
12:30 CET (UTC+01:00)		Report	Roncaglia (yellow card) 58'	Stadium: Stadio Olimpico di Torino; Attendance: 21,258; Referee: Paolo Valeri

19 January 2014 20	Catania	0–3	Fiorentina	Catania
15:00 CET (UTC+01:00)	Rinaudo (yellow card) 45'; Barrientos (yellow card) 59'	Report	Fernández 25'; Matri 28', 41'; Gonzalo (yellow card) 49'	Stadium: Stadio Angelo Massimino; Attendance: 14,633; Referee: Luca Banti

26 January 2014 21	Fiorentina	3–3	Genoa	Florence
20:45 CET (UTC+01:00)	Cuadrado (yellow card) 27'; Aquilani 33' (pen.), 42', 57'	Report	Gilardino 27' (pen.); De Maio (yellow card) 32', (goal) 77'; Antonini 34'; Bertolacci (yellow card) 40'	Stadium: Stadio Artemio Franchi; Attendance: 29,776; Referee: Dino Tommasi

1 February 2014 22	Cagliari	1–0	Fiorentina	Cagliari
18:00 CET (UTC+01:00)	Pinilla 39' (pen.); Rossettini (yellow card) 40'; Dessena (yellow card) 44'	Report	Gonzalo (yellow card) 43'	Stadium: Stadio Sant'Elia; Attendance: 4,798; Referee: Paolo Mazzoleni

8 February 2014 23	Fiorentina	2–0	Atalanta	Florence
18:00 CET (UTC+01:00)	Iličić 16'; Valero (yellow card) 59'; Wolski 86'	Report	Migliaccio (yellow card) 31'; Cigarini (yellow card) 55' (yellow-red card) 81'; Stendardo (yellow card) 61'	Stadium: Stadio Artemio Franchi; Attendance: 28,319; Referee: Marco Guida

15 February 2014 24	Fiorentina	1–2	Internazionale	Florence
20:45 CET (UTC+01:00)	Cuadrado 46'; Aquilani (yellow card) 60'; Matri (yellow card) 90+3'	Report	Jonathan (yellow card) 16'; Palacio 34', (yellow card) 71'; Rolando (yellow card) 44'; Guarín (yellow card) 60'; Icardi 65'; Samuel (yellow card) 81'	Stadium: Stadio Artemio Franchi; Attendance: 35,584; Referee: Antonio Damato

24 February 2014 25	Parma	2–2	Fiorentina	Parma
19:00 CET (UTC+01:00)	Molinaro (yellow card) 31'; Cassano 39'; Amauri 51' (pen.); Gargano (yellow card) 56'; Mirante (yellow card) 78'; Paletta (yellow card) 90+2'; Munari (red card) 90+4'	Report	Diakité (yellow card) 26' (yellow-red card) 54'; Cuadrado 41'; Tomović (yellow card) 50'; Pizarro (yellow card) 51'; Fernández 85'; Savić (yellow card) 90+3'; Valero (red card) 90+4'	Stadium: Stadio Ennio Tardini; Attendance: 14,014; Referee: Andrea Gervasoni

2 March 2014 26	Fiorentina	0–1	Lazio	Florence
20:45 CET (UTC+01:00)	Ambrosini (yellow card) 8'; Tomović (yellow card) 61'; Pasqual (yellow card) 80'	Report	Cana 5'; Ciani (yellow card) 13'; Lulić (yellow card) 36'; Marchetti (yellow card) 84'	Stadium: Stadio Artemio Franchi; Attendance: 28,488; Referee: Luca Banti

9 March 2014 27	Juventus	1–0	Fiorentina	Turin
12:30 CET (UTC+01:00)	Vidal (yellow card) 12'; Asamoah 42', (yellow card) 90+1'	Report	Matos (yellow card) 81'; Savić (yellow card) 85'; Aquilani (yellow card) 87'; Gonzalo (yellow card) 90+3'	Stadium: Juventus Stadium; Attendance: 39,105; Referee: Daniele Orsato

16 March 2014 28	Fiorentina	3–1	Chievo	Florence
20:45 CET (UTC+01:00)	Cuadrado 11'; Matri 39'; Gómez 89'	Report	Rigoni (yellow card) 13'; Paloschi 62'; Hetemaj (yellow card) 75'; Rubin (yellow card) 81'	Stadium: Stadio Artemio Franchi; Attendance: 27,767; Referee: Davide Massa

23 March 2014 29	Napoli	0–1	Fiorentina	Naples
18:30 CET (UTC+01:00)	Ghoulam (red card) 37'; Higuaín (yellow card) 58'	Report	Gonzalo (yellow card) 49'; Joaquín 87'	Stadium: Stadio San Paolo; Attendance: 46,522; Referee: Paolo Tagliavento

26 March 2014 30	Fiorentina	0–2	Milan	Florence
20:45 CET (UTC+01:00)	Ambrosini (yellow card) 19'; Roncaglia (yellow card) 63'; Gonzalo (yellow card) 89'	Report	Balotelli (yellow card) 16', (goal) 64'; Mexès 23', (yellow card) 87'; De Jong (yellow card) 42'; Constant (yellow card) 52'; Taarabt (yellow card) 67'; Abbiati (yellow card) 70'; Bonera (yellow card) 78'	Stadium: Stadio Artemio Franchi; Attendance: 32,280; Referee: Daniele Orsato

30 March 2014 31	Sampdoria	0–0	Fiorentina	Genoa
15:00 CEST (UTC+02:00)	Berardi (yellow card) 19'; Okaka (yellow card) 89'	Report	Savić (yellow card) 30'; Wolski (yellow card) 33'; Matos (yellow card) 90'	Stadium: Stadio Luigi Ferraris; Attendance: 21,695; Referee: Carmine Russo

6 April 2014 32	Fiorentina	2–1	Udinese	Florence
15:00 CEST (UTC+02:00)	Cuadrado 25'; Ambrosini (yellow card) 47'; Gonzalo 72' (pen.)	Report	Badu (yellow card) 35'; Muriel (yellow card) 62'; Danilo (yellow card) 71'; Pasqual 82' (o.g.); Pereyra (yellow card) 89'; Heurtaux (yellow card) 90+1'	Stadium: Stadio Artemio Franchi; Attendance: 31,073; Referee: Domenico Celi

13 April 2014 33	Hellas Verona	3–5	Fiorentina	Verona
15:00 CEST (UTC+02:00)	Sala (yellow card) 11', (goal) 14'; Donadel (red card) 69'; Toni 73' (pen.); Maietta (yellow card) 82'; Iturbe 90+1'	Report	Cuadrado 31'; Aquilani 44', 86'; Valero 63'; Savić (yellow card) 67'; Pizarro (yellow card) 72'; Matri 83' (pen.)	Stadium: Stadio Marc'Antonio Bentegodi; Attendance: 23,778; Referee: Sebastiano Peruzzo

19 April 2014 34	Fiorentina	0–1	Roma	Florence
15:00 CEST (UTC+02:00)	Pasqual (yellow card) 42'; Tomović (yellow card) 90+1'; Matri (yellow card) 90+4'	Report	Nainggolan 26'; Ljajić (yellow card) 40'; Castán (yellow card) 53'; Dodô (yellow card) 56'; Toloi (yellow card) 70'	Stadium: Stadio Artemio Franchi; Attendance: 34,604; Referee: Paolo Mazzoleni

27 April 2014 35	Bologna	0–3	Fiorentina	Bologna
18:00 CEST (UTC+02:00)	Kone (yellow card) 71'	Report	Diakité (yellow card) 11'; Cuadrado 23', 87'; Iličić 34'	Stadium: Stadio Renato Dall'Ara; Attendance: 23,875; Referee: Davide Massa

6 May 2014 36	Fiorentina	3–4	Sassuolo	Florence
19:00 CEST (UTC+02:00)	Valero (yellow card) 22'; Cuadrado (yellow card) 34', (goal) 75'; Gonzalo 57' (pen.); Rossi 72'; Pasqual (yellow card) 90+1'	Report	Gazzola (yellow card) 3'; Berardi 23' (pen.), 33', 42', (yellow card) 79'; Longhi (yellow card) 30'; Sansone 64'	Stadium: Stadio Artemio Franchi; Attendance: 30,470; Referee: Paolo Tagliavento

11 May 2014 37	Livorno	0–1	Fiorentina	Livorno
15:00 CEST (UTC+02:00)	Castellini (yellow card) 11'; Ceccherini (yellow card) 45'; Mosquera (yellow card) 78'; Belfodil (yellow card) 89'; Benassi (yellow card) 90'; Borja (yellow card) 90+2' (red card) 90+3'	Report	Matos (yellow card) 28'; Vargas (yellow card) 45'; Cuadrado 57'; Roncaglia (yellow card) 81'	Stadium: Stadio Armando Picchi; Attendance: 9,776; Referee: Piero Giacomelli

18 May 2014 38	Fiorentina	2–2	Torino	Florence
20:45 CEST (UTC+02:00)	Pizarro (yellow card) 27'; Rossi 57' (pen.); Rebić 79'; Gonzalo (yellow card) 83'; Cuadrado (yellow card) 85'; Vargas (yellow card) 86'; Roncaglia (yellow card) 90+3'	Report	Vives (yellow card) 56'; Larrondo 67'; Darmian (yellow card) 76'; Kurtić 84'	Stadium: Stadio Artemio Franchi; Attendance: 40,912; Referee: Nicola Rizzoli

=== Coppa Italia ===
8 January 2014 Round of 16	Fiorentina	2–0	Chievo	Florence
21:00 CET (UTC+01:00)	Joaquín 29'; Ambrosini (yellow card) 32' (yellow-red card) 84'; Valero (yellow card) 43'; Rebić 45+2'		Radovanović (yellow card) 13'; Cesar (yellow card) 33'; Sardo (yellow card) 44' (yellow-red card) 68'; Hetemaj (yellow card) 45+1'	Stadium: Stadio Artemio Franchi; Referee: Massimiliano Irrati

23 January 2014 Quarter-finals	Fiorentina	2–1	Siena	Florence
21:00 CET (UTC+01:00)	Iličić 20', (yellow card) 53'; Cuadrado (yellow card) 36'; Roncaglia (yellow card) 58'; Compper 75'		Giacomazzi (yellow card) 30', (goal) 59'; Pulzetti (yellow card) 90+4'	Stadium: Stadio Artemio Franchi; Attendance: 15,321; Referee: Piero Giacomelli

4 February 2014 Semi-finals; First leg	Udinese	2–1	Fiorentina	Udine
21:00 CET (UTC+01:00)	Di Natale 36', (yellow card) 44'; Muriel 82', (yellow card) 90+3'		Valero (yellow card) 38'; Vargas 44', (yellow card) 53'	Stadium: Stadio Friuli; Attendance: 7,000; Referee: Carmine Russo

11 February 2014 Semi-finals; Second leg	Fiorentina	2–0 (3–2 agg.)	Udinese	Florence
20:45 CET (UTC+01:00)	Pasqual 14'; Aquilani (yellow card) 58'; Cuadrado 61', (yellow card) 90+2'		Domizzi (yellow card) 83' (red card) 90+7'; Badu (red card) 90+4'; Muriel (yellow card) 90+5'	Stadium: Stadio Artemio Franchi; Attendance: 30,000; Referee: Davide Massa

3 May 2014 Final	Fiorentina	1–3	Napoli	Rome
21:00 CEST (UTC+02:00)	Valero (yellow card) 10'; Vargas 28'; Iličić (yellow card) 40'; Tomović (yellow card) 48'; Fernández (yellow card) 65'		Insigne 11', 17'; Albiol (yellow card) 36'; Inler (yellow card) 50' (yellow-red card) 79'; Reina (yellow card) 81'; Mertens 90+2'	Stadium: Stadio Olimpico; Attendance: 65,000; Referee: Daniele Orsato

=== UEFA Europa League ===
==== Play-off round ====
22 August 2013 First leg	Grasshopper (Switzerland)	1–2	(Italy) Fiorentina	Zürich, Switzerland
21:00 CEST (UTC+02:00)	Gashi (yellow card) 57'; Ngamukol 64'	Report	Cuadrado 13'; Grichting 46' (o.g.); Neto (yellow card) 87'; Ambrosini (yellow card) 90+5'	Stadium: Letzigrund; Attendance: 15,033; Referee: Matej Jug (Slovenia)

29 August 2013 Second leg	Fiorentina (Italy)	0–1 (2a–2 agg.)	(Switzerland) Grasshopper	Florence, Italy
21:00 CEST (UTC+02:00)	Pasqual (yellow card) 59'; Neto (yellow card) 70'; Aquilani (yellow card) 87'; Iličić (yellow card) 90+3'	Report	Pavlović (yellow card) 12'; Ben Khalifa 41'; Abrashi (yellow card) 45'; Salatić (yellow card) 60'; Nzuzi (yellow card) 90'	Stadium: Stadio Artemio Franchi; Attendance: 22,227; Referee: Ivan Bebek (Croatia)

==== Group stage ====
Pos	Team	Pld	W	D	L	GF	GA	GD	Pts	Qualification
1	(Italy) Fiorentina	6	5	1	0	12	3	+9	16	Advance to knockout phase
2	(Ukraine) Dnipro Dnipropetrovsk	6	4	0	2	11	5	+6	12	Advance to knockout phase
3	(Portugal) Paços de Ferreira	6	0	3	3	1	8	−7	3	
4	(Romania) Pandurii Târgu Jiu	6	0	2	4	3	11	−8	2	

Source: Soccerway

19 September 2013 1	Fiorentina (Italy)	3–0	(Portugal) Paços de Ferreira	Florence, Italy
19:00 CEST (UTC+02:00)	Gonzalo 30'; Alonso (yellow card) 56'; Aquilani (yellow card) 62'; Matos 67', (yellow card) 68'; Rossi 76'	Report	Leão (yellow card) 9'; Seri (yellow card) 60'; Rui Miguel (yellow card) 78'	Stadium: Stadio Artemio Franchi; Attendance: 13,729; Referee: Kevin Blom (Netherlands)

3 October 2013 2	Dnipro Dnipropetrovsk (Ukraine)	1–2	(Italy) Fiorentina	Dnipropetrovsk, Ukraine
21:05 CEST (UTC+02:00)	Seleznyov 57' (pen.)	Report	Bakić (yellow card) 15'; Gonzalo 53' (pen.); Cuadrado (yellow card) 54'; Pizarro (yellow card) 56' (yellow-red card) 86'; Ambrosini 73'	Stadium: Dnipro-Arena; Attendance: 25,837; Referee: Szymon Marciniak (Poland)

24 October 2013 3	Fiorentina (Italy)	3–0	(Romania) Pandurii	Florence, Italy
21:05 CEST (UTC+02:00)	Joaquín 26'; Matos 34'; Fernández (yellow card) 48'; Compper (yellow card) 66'; Cuadrado 69', (yellow card) 73'	Report	Anton (yellow card) 56'; Matulevičius (yellow card) 76'; Breeveld (yellow card) 88'	Stadium: Stadio Artemio Franchi; Attendance: 14,834; Referee: Miroslav Zelinka (Czech Republic)

7 November 2013 4	Pandurii (Romania)	1–2	(Italy) Fiorentina	Cluj-Napoca, Romania
19:00 CET (UTC+01:00)	Erico (yellow card) 23'; Eric 32'; Momčilović (yellow card) 55'; Anton (yellow card) 79'; Mingote (yellow card) 89'	Report	Gonzalo (yellow card) 69'; Valero (yellow card) 79', (goal) 90+2'; Matos 86'	Stadium: Cluj Arena; Attendance: 11,750; Referee: Anastasios Sidiropoulos (Greece)

28 November 2013 5	Paços de Ferreira (Portugal)	0–0	(Italy) Fiorentina	Porto, Portugal
21:05 CET (UTC+01:00)	Valente (yellow card) 79'	Report	Bakić (yellow card) 20'; Pizarro (yellow card) 69'	Stadium: Estádio do Dragão; Attendance: 1,347; Referee: Eitan Shemeulevitch (Israel)

12 December 2013 6	Fiorentina (Italy)	2–1	(Ukraine) Dnipro Dnipropetrovsk	Florence, Italy
19:00 CET (UTC+01:00)	Ambrosini (yellow card) 22'; Fernández (yellow card) 25'; Roncaglia (yellow card) 40'; Joaquín 42'; Cuadrado 77'	Report	Konoplyanka 13'; Kulakov (yellow card) 65'; Seleznyov (yellow card) 85'	Stadium: Stadio Artemio Franchi; Attendance: 12,486; Referee: Artur Soares Dias (Portugal)

==== Knockout phase ====
===== Round of 32 =====
20 February 2014 First leg	Esbjerg (Denmark)	1–3	(Italy) Fiorentina	Esbjerg, Denmark
19:00 CET (UTC+01:00)	Pušić 10'; Jakobsen (yellow card) 34'; Drobo-Ampem (yellow card) 90'	Report	Matri 9'; Iličić 15', (yellow card) 70'; Aquilani 37' (pen.)	Stadium: Blue Water Arena; Attendance: 11,033; Referee: Sergei Karasev (Russia)

27 February 2014 Second leg	Fiorentina (Italy)	1–1 (4–2 agg.)	(Denmark) Esbjerg	Florence, Italy
21:05 CET (UTC+01:00)	Iličić 47'	Report	Knudsen (yellow card) 38'; Vestergaard 90+1'	Stadium: Stadio Artemio Franchi; Attendance: 13,815; Referee: Marijo Strahonja (Croatia)

===== Round of 16 =====
13 March 2014 First leg	Juventus (Italy)	1–1	(Italy) Fiorentina	Turin, Italy
21:05 CET (UTC+01:00)	Vidal 3'	Report	Pizarro (yellow card) 55'; Gonzalo (yellow card) 57'; Gómez 79'	Stadium: Juventus Stadium; Attendance: 39,610; Referee: Björn Kuipers (Netherlands)

20 March 2014 Second leg	Fiorentina (Italy)	0–1 (1–2 agg.)	(Italy) Juventus	Florence, Italy
19:00 CET (UTC+01:00)	Gonzalo (yellow card) 31' (yellow-red card) 69'; Cuadrado (yellow card) 55'; Neto (yellow card) 90+4'	Report	Vidal (yellow card) 50'; Pirlo 71'; Tevez (yellow card) 90+4'	Stadium: Stadio Artemio Franchi; Attendance: 32,633; Referee: Howard Webb (England)

== Statistics ==
=== Appearances and goals ===
No.	Pos	Nat	Player	Total		Serie A		Coppa Italia		Europa League	
No.	Pos	Nat	Player	Apps	Goals	Apps	Goals	Apps	Goals	Apps	Goals
Goalkeepers
1	GK	(Brazil) BRA	Neto	49	0	35	0	5	0	9	0
12	GK	(Italy) ITA	Cristiano Lupatelli	0	0	0	0	0	0	0	0
25	GK	(Italy) ITA	Antonio Rosati	4	0	3	0	0	0	1	0
Defenders
2	DF	(Argentina) ARG	Gonzalo Rodríguez	48	6	33	4	5	0	10	2
3	DF	(France) FRA	Modibo Diakité	11	0	9	0	2	0	0	0
4	DF	(Argentina) ARG	Facundo Roncaglia	25	0	11+2	0	2	0	8+2	0
5	DF	(Germany) GER	Marvin Compper	19	1	8+1	0	2+1	1	7	0
6	DF	(Egypt) EGY	Ahmed Hegazi	1	0	1	0	0	0	0	0
15	DF	(Montenegro) MNE	Stefan Savić	40	0	31	0	3	0	6	0
23	DF	(Italy) ITA	Manuel Pasqual	36	1	27	0	4	1	5	0
40	DF	(Serbia) SRB	Nenad Tomović	35	0	23+2	0	2	0	6+2	0
Midfielders
7	MF	(Chile) CHI	David Pizarro	42	1	24+4	1	3+2	0	6+3	0
8	MF	(Montenegro) MNE	Marko Bakić	10	0	1+2	0	0	0	3+4	0
10	MF	(Italy) ITA	Alberto Aquilani	44	7	31	6	3	0	6+4	1
11	MF	(Colombia) COL	Juan Cuadrado	43	15	31+1	11	2+1	1	6+2	3
14	MF	(Chile) CHI	Matías Fernández	38	3	12+11	3	4+1	0	9+1	0
17	MF	(Spain) ESP	Joaquín	37	5	15+11	2	5	1	5+1	2
20	MF	(Spain) ESP	Borja Valero	47	7	31+1	6	4	0	9+2	1
21	MF	(Italy) ITA	Massimo Ambrosini	30	1	16+5	0	1	0	6+2	1
27	MF	(Poland) POL	Rafał Wolski	15	1	5+9	1	1	0	0	0
31	MF	(Italy) ITA	Leonardo Capezzi	1	0	0	0	0	0	0+1	0
66	MF	(Peru) PER	Juan Manuel Vargas	31	6	14+10	4	2+2	2	1+2	0
72	MF	(Slovenia) SVN	Josip Iličić	31	6	13+8	3	2	1	5+3	2
88	MF	(Brazil) BRA	Anderson	8	0	4+3	0	0+1	0	0	0
Forwards
9	FW	(Croatia) CRO	Ante Rebić	5	2	0+4	1	1	1	0	0
30	FW	(Brazil) BRA	Ryder Matos	35	3	5+18	0	0+4	0	7+1	3
32	FW	(Italy) ITA	Alessandro Matri	21	5	10+5	4	2+1	0	2+1	1
33	FW	(Germany) GER	Mario Gómez	15	4	5+4	3	0	0	4+2	1
49	FW	(Italy) ITA	Giuseppe Rossi	24	17	19+2	16	0+1	0	2	1
Players transferred out during the season
3	DF	(Spain) ESP	Marcos Alonso	9	0	1+2	0	0	0	5+1	0
18	MF	(Uruguay) URU	Matías Vecino	7	0	1+5	0	0+1	0	0	0
22	FW	(Serbia) SRB	Adem Ljajić	1	0	0	0	0	0	0+1	0
77	MF	(Ukraine) UKR	Oleksandr Yakovenko	5	0	0+2	0	0	0	2+1	0
78	GK	(Uruguay) URU	Gustavo Munúa	2	0	0	0	0	0	2	0
83	MF	(Uruguay) URU	Rubén Olivera	1	0	0+1	0	0	0	0	0

Last updated: 18 May 2014
Source: Competitions

=== Goalscorers ===
Rank	No.	Pos	Nat	Name	Serie A	Coppa Italia	UEFA EL	Total
1	49	FW	(Italy)	Giuseppe Rossi	16	0	1	17
2	11	MF	(Colombia)	Juan Cuadrado	11	1	3	15
3	10	MF	(Italy)	Alberto Aquilani	6	0	1	7
3	20	MF	(Spain)	Borja Valero	6	0	1	7
5	2	DF	(Argentina)	Gonzalo Rodríguez	4	0	2	6
5	66	MF	(Peru)	Juan Manuel Vargas	4	2	0	6
5	72	MF	(Slovenia)	Josip Iličić	3	1	2	6
8	17	MF	(Spain)	Joaquín	2	1	2	5
8	32	FW	(Italy)	Alessandro Matri	4	0	1	5
10	33	FW	(Germany)	Mario Gómez	3	0	1	4
11	14	MF	(Chile)	Matías Fernández	3	0	0	3
11	30	FW	(Brazil)	Ryder Matos	0	0	3	3
13	9	FW	(Croatia)	Ante Rebić	1	1	0	2
14	5	DF	(Germany)	Marvin Compper	0	1	0	1
14	7	MF	(Chile)	David Pizarro	1	0	0	1
14	21	MF	(Italy)	Massimo Ambrosini	0	0	1	1
14	23	DF	(Italy)	Manuel Pasqual	0	1	0	1
14	27	MF	(Poland)	Rafał Wolski	1	0	0	1
Own goal					0	0	1	1
Totals					65	8	19	92

Last updated: 18 May 2014

=== Clean sheets ===
Rank	No.	Pos	Nat	Name	Serie A	Coppa Italia	UEFA EL	Total
1	1	GK	(Brazil)	Neto	12	2	2	16
2	25	GK	(Italy)	Antonio Rosati	1	0	0	1
2	78	GK	(Uruguay)	Gustavo Munúa	0	0	1	1
Totals					13	2	3	18

Last updated: 18 May 2014

=== Disciplinary record ===
No.	Pos	Nat	Name	Serie A			Coppa Italia			UEFA EL			Total		
No.	Pos	Nat	Name	Booked	(yellow card) (yellow-red card)	Sent off (straight red)	Booked	(yellow card) (yellow-red card)	Sent off (straight red)	Booked	(yellow card) (yellow-red card)	Sent off (straight red)	Booked	(yellow card) (yellow-red card)	Sent off (straight red)
1	GK	(Brazil)	Neto	2	0	0	0	0	0	3	0	0	5	0	0
12	GK	(Italy)	Cristiano Lupatelli	0	0	0	0	0	0	0	0	0	0	0	0
24	GK	(Italy)	Luca Lezzerini	0	0	0	0	0	0	0	0	0	0	0	0
25	GK	(Italy)	Antonio Rosati	0	0	0	0	0	0	0	0	0	0	0	0
78	GK	(Uruguay)	Gustavo Munúa	0	0	0	0	0	0	0	0	0	0	0	0
2	DF	(Argentina)	Gonzalo Rodríguez	13	0	0	0	0	0	2	1	0	15	1	0
3	DF	(Spain)	Marcos Alonso	0	0	0	0	0	0	1	0	0	1	0	0
3	DF	(France)	Modibo Diakité	1	1	0	0	0	0	0	0	0	1	1	0
4	DF	(Argentina)	Facundo Roncaglia	4	0	0	1	0	0	1	0	0	6	0	0
5	DF	(Germany)	Marvin Compper	3	0	0	0	0	0	1	0	0	4	0	0
6	DF	(Egypt)	Ahmed Hegazi	0	0	0	0	0	0	0	0	0	0	0	0
15	DF	(Montenegro)	Stefan Savić	5	0	0	0	0	0	0	0	0	5	0	0
23	DF	(Italy)	Manuel Pasqual	5	0	0	0	0	0	1	0	0	6	0	0
40	DF	(Serbia)	Nenad Tomović	5	0	0	1	0	0	0	0	0	6	0	0
7	MF	(Chile)	David Pizarro	6	0	1	0	0	0	2	1	0	8	1	1
8	MF	(Montenegro)	Marko Bakić	0	0	0	0	0	0	2	0	0	2	0	0
10	MF	(Italy)	Alberto Aquilani	7	0	0	1	0	0	2	0	0	10	0	0
11	MF	(Colombia)	Juan Cuadrado	8	1	0	2	0	0	3	0	0	13	1	0
14	MF	(Chile)	Matías Fernández	1	0	0	1	0	0	2	0	0	4	0	0
17	MF	(Spain)	Joaquín	0	0	0	0	0	0	0	0	0	0	0	0
18	MF	(Uruguay)	Matías Vecino	0	0	0	0	0	0	0	0	0	0	0	0
20	MF	(Spain)	Borja Valero	5	0	1	3	0	0	1	0	0	9	0	1
21	MF	(Italy)	Massimo Ambrosini	7	0	0	0	1	0	2	0	0	9	1	0
27	MF	(Poland)	Rafał Wolski	2	0	0	0	0	0	0	0	0	2	0	0
31	MF	(Italy)	Leonardo Capezzi	0	0	0	0	0	0	0	0	0	0	0	0
66	MF	(Peru)	Juan Manuel Vargas	2	0	0	1	0	0	0	0	0	3	0	0
72	MF	(Slovenia)	Josip Iličić	1	0	0	2	0	0	2	0	0	5	0	0
77	MF	(Ukraine)	Oleksandr Yakovenko	0	0	0	0	0	0	0	0	0	0	0	0
83	MF	(Uruguay)	Rubén Olivera	0	0	0	0	0	0	0	0	0	0	0	0
88	MF	(Brazil)	Anderson	0	0	0	0	0	0	0	0	0	0	0	0
9	FW	(Croatia)	Ante Rebić	1	0	0	0	0	0	0	0	0	1	0	0
22	FW	(Serbia)	Adem Ljajić	0	0	0	0	0	0	0	0	0	0	0	0
30	FW	(Brazil)	Ryder Matos	4	0	0	0	0	0	1	0	0	5	0	0
32	FW	(Italy)	Alessandro Matri	2	0	0	0	0	0	0	0	0	2	0	0
33	FW	(Germany)	Mario Gómez	1	0	0	0	0	0	0	0	0	1	0	0
49	FW	(Italy)	Giuseppe Rossi	1	0	0	0	0	0	0	0	0	1	0	0
Totals				86	2	2	12	1	0	26	2	0	124	5	2

Last updated: 18 May 2014
