= 2014 Coppa Italia final =

66th Coppa Italia final
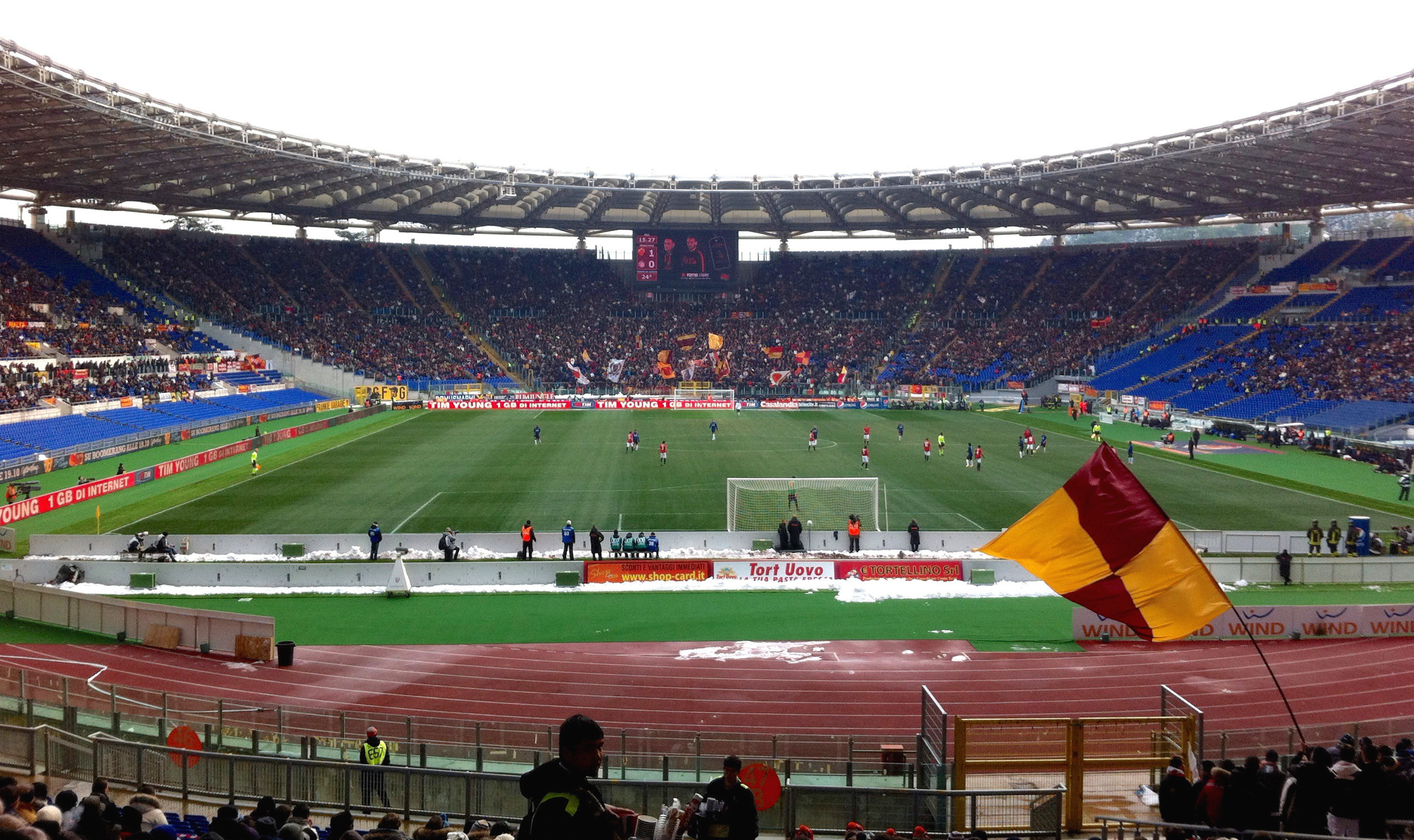
- The Stadio Olimpico in Rome held the final
- Event: 2013–14 Coppa Italia
Fiorentina	Napoli
1	3
- Date: 3 May 2014
- Venue: Stadio Olimpico, Rome
- Referee: Daniele Orsato
- Attendance: 65,000

The 2014 Coppa Italia final decided the winner of the 2013–14 Coppa Italia, Italy's main football cup. It was played on 3 May 2014 at the Stadio Olimpico in Rome, between Fiorentina and Napoli. Napoli won the game 3–1, with two early goals from Lorenzo Insigne and a late third by substitute Dries Mertens, although they had Gökhan Inler sent off in the second half. Juan Manuel Vargas scored Fiorentina's goal.

As Napoli qualified for the UEFA Champions League by their league position, Fiorentina as runners-up qualified for the Group Stage of the 2014–15 UEFA Europa League. This was the last season in which cup runners-up could qualify for the Europa League if the winner had already qualified for the Champions League. Napoli went on to play in the 2014 Supercoppa Italiana against the 2013–14 Serie A champions Juventus, and won.

The final was marred by pre-match violence, which delayed the scheduled kick-off time. Three Napoli fans were shot, one of whom died following a two-month coma. Club President Aurelio De Laurentiis dedicated Napoli's victory to the wounded fans.

== Background ==
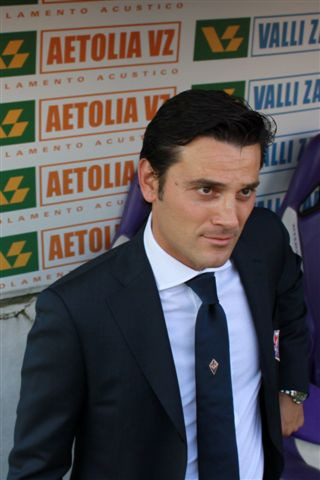
Fiorentina manager Vincenzo Montella aimed for his team to finish fourth in Serie A and win the Coppa Italia

Fiorentina played their 10th Coppa Italia final, having won six, including their last in 2001. It was Napoli's ninth, and they had previously won four, including their last final in 2012.

During the league season, Fiorentina and Napoli had already played each other twice. The first fixture, on 30 October 2013 at the Stadio Artemio Franchi, resulted in a 2–1 away win for Napoli which ended Fiorentina's unbeaten home record. All of the goals came in the first half—José Callejón opened the scoring, Giuseppe Rossi equalised with a penalty and Dries Mertens scored the winner in the 36th minute. In the closing stages of the game, Christian Maggio was sent off for the visitors, and Juan Cuadrado for the hosts. In the reverse fixture, at Napoli's Stadio San Paolo on 23 March 2014, Fiorentina were victorious as Joaquín scored the only goal of the game with three minutes remaining; Faouzi Ghoulam had been sent off for the hosts in the first half for fouling Marko Bakić when the Fiorentina midfielder had an opportunity to score.

Prior to the cup final, Napoli were in third place in Serie A and therefore in the last position to qualify for the Champions League, eight points ahead of Fiorentina with nine points left to play for. Fiorentina manager Vincenzo Montella said before the game that his priority was to finish fourth and win the Coppa Italia. His Napoli counterpart, Rafael Benítez, warned his players not to expect to win solely based on their league position.

Players and staff of both clubs were invited to Vatican City the day before the final, where they listened to a speech by Pope Francis. Managers Montella and Benítez presented souvenirs of their clubs to the Pope.

== Road to the final ==
Fiorentina		Round	Napoli
Opponent	Result	2013–14 Coppa Italia	Opponent	Result
Chievo	2–0	Round of 16	Atalanta	3–1
Siena	2–1	Quarter-finals	Lazio	1–0
Udinese	1–2 (A), 2–0 (H) (3–2 agg.)	Semi-finals	Roma	2–3 (A), 3–0 (H) (5–3 agg.)

=== Fiorentina ===
Fiorentina, of Serie A, entered the tournament in the Last 16 at home to Chievo, also of their league. They won 2–0 with first-half goals from Joaquín and Ante Rebić, despite the dismissal of Massimo Ambrosini. In the quarter-final on 23 January, again at home, they beat Serie B Siena 2–1 with Josip Iličić opening the scoring and Marvin Compper scoring the winner. Fiorentina's semi-final against Udinese began with a 2–1 away defeat on 4 February, but the second leg on 12 February was a 2–0 home victory with goals from Manuel Pasqual and Cuadrado.

=== Napoli ===
Napoli, also of Serie A, entered in the Last 16 on 15 January with a 3–1 home win over Atalanta, in which Callejón scored twice and Lorenzo Insigne the other goal. Their quarter-final on 29 January was a 1–0 victory at home over cup holders Lazio, with a late goal from Gonzalo Higuaín. Like Fiorentina, Napoli began their semi-final with an away defeat (3–2 against Roma), but secured their place in the final with a 3–0 victory at home on 12 February, with goals from Callejón, Higuaín and Jorginho.

== Match ==
=== Team selection ===
Fiorentina were without record signing Mario Gómez, the German striker having suffered with injury all season. Their top scorer of the season, Giuseppe Rossi, had been injured since January but was included as a substitute. Montella opined that Rossi would be ready to represent Italy at the World Cup in June. Goalkeeper Neto and midfielder Borja Valero had been doubts due to recent finger and knee injuries respectively, but made the starting line-up. Midfielder Cuadrado was suspended, having been given a yellow card towards the end of their semi-final victory over Udinese.

Napoli's top scorer of the season, Higuaín, started despite a bruise to his shin from his last match. Benítez said "Not everyone in the team is 100 per cent, but we are in good shape".

=== Pre-match violence ===
Three Napoli fans were shot outside the stadium before the match, two with arm injuries. Ciro Esposito, who was in a critical state after being shot in the chest, died in hospital on 25 June. Police, who found the gun, have stated that they do not believe that the shootings were related to other clashes by the two sets of fans: prior to the game, there were reports of firecrackers and other projectiles being thrown between them in the Tor di Quinto area of Rome. Kick-off was subsequently delayed as Napoli fans did not want the match to start without knowing the condition of the shot fans. When match organisers attempted to speak to the Napoli fans, accompanied by their midfielder Marek Hamšík, they were "pelted with flares and smoke bombs". Daniele De Santis, a Roma ultra was convicted of shooting Esposito and was sentenced to 26 years in prison on 24 May 2016; his sentenced was later reduced on appeals to 16 years on 26 September 2018.

=== Summary ===
Napoli winger Insigne opened the scoring in the 11th minute by cutting in from the left and curling a shot past Fiorentina goalkeeper Neto. He doubled the lead six minutes later by connecting to Higuaín's cross and forcing a deflection off Nenad Tomović. With two goals in the final, he equalled the number of goals that he had scored in the entire Serie A season. Fiorentina responded in the 28th minute, when Josip Iličić chipped the defence and Juan Vargas volleyed the ball into the goal.

Fiorentina had chances to equalise in the second half, with a long shot from substitute Matías Fernández tipped over the crossbar by Napoli goalkeeper Pepe Reina, and Iličić missing a one-on-one. Despite being reduced to ten men for the last ten minutes after a second booking for Gökhan Inler after he fouled Iličić, Napoli extended their lead in injury time when substitute Mertens scored a third after being set up by Callejón.

=== Details ===
3 May 2014
21:45 CEST

Fiorentina	1–3	Napoli
Vargas 28'	Report	Insigne 11', 17'; Mertens 90+2'

Stadio Olimpico, Rome
Attendance: 65,000
Referee: Daniele Orsato

Fiorentina	Napoli

GK	1	(Brazil) Neto
RB	40	(Serbia) Nenad Tomović	(yellow card) 48'
CB	2	(Argentina) Gonzalo Rodríguez
CB	15	(Montenegro) Stefan Savić
LB	23	(Italy) Manuel Pasqual (c)		(substituted off) 56'
DM	7	(Chile) David Pizarro
RM	10	(Italy) Alberto Aquilani		(substituted off) 83'
LM	66	(Peru) Juan Manuel Vargas
AM	20	(Spain) Borja Valero	(yellow card) 10'
CF	17	(Spain) Joaquín		(substituted off) 72'
CF	72	(Slovenia) Josip Iličić	(yellow card) 40'
Substitutes:
GK	25	(Italy) Antonio Rosati
DF	3	(France) Modibo Diakité
DF	4	(Argentina) Facundo Roncaglia
DF	5	(Germany) Marvin Compper
MF	8	(Montenegro) Marko Bakić
MF	14	(Chile) Matías Fernández	(yellow card) 65'	(substituted on) 56'
MF	21	(Italy) Massimo Ambrosini
MF	27	(Poland) Rafał Wolski
MF	30	(Brazil) Ryder Matos
MF	88	(Brazil) Anderson
FW	32	(Italy) Alessandro Matri		(substituted on) 83'
FW	49	(Italy) Giuseppe Rossi		(substituted on) 72'
Manager:
(Italy) Vincenzo Montella

GK	25	(Spain) Pepe Reina	(yellow card) 81'
RB	4	(Brazil) Henrique
CB	21	(Argentina) Federico Fernández
CB	33	(Spain) Raúl Albiol	(yellow card) 36'
LB	31	(Algeria) Faouzi Ghoulam
CM	88	(Switzerland) Gökhan Inler	(yellow card) 50' (yellow-red card) 79'
CM	8	(Italy) Jorginho
RW	7	(Spain) José Callejón
AM	17	(Slovakia) Marek Hamšík (c)		(substituted off) 63'
LW	24	(Italy) Lorenzo Insigne		(substituted off) 81'
CF	9	(Argentina) Gonzalo Higuaín		(substituted off) 70'
Substitutes:
GK	15	(Italy) Roberto Colombo
GK	80	(Spain) Toni Doblas
DF	2	(France) Anthony Réveillère
DF	5	(Uruguay) Miguel Britos
DF	11	(Italy) Christian Maggio
MF	14	(Belgium) Dries Mertens		(substituted on) 63'
MF	16	(Italy) Giandomenico Mesto
MF	18	(Colombia) Juan Zúñiga
MF	20	(Switzerland) Blerim Džemaili
MF	85	(Switzerland) Valon Behrami		(substituted on) 81'
FW	19	(North Macedonia) Goran Pandev		(substituted on) 70'
FW	91	(Colombia) Duván Zapata
Manager:
(Spain) Rafael Benítez

== Post-match ==
Napoli supporters invaded the pitch to celebrate following their team's victory. However, they were brought under control in order to allow the trophy ceremony to take place.

Aurelio De Laurentiis, club president of Napoli, dedicated the cup win to the then unidentified fan who had been shot before the match and operated on. On the pre-match violence, Demetrio Albertini, vice president of the Italian Football Federation, said, "It certainly wasn't a great scene, what we displayed today alongside football, for a football lover like me, it was an ugly display."

As cup winners, Napoli qualified for the 2014 Supercoppa Italiana in which they would face Serie A champions Juventus. The match had traditionally taken place in August, but Napoli requested it be moved due to their Champions League play-off that month. The fixture was eventually played on 22 December during the league's winter break, at the Jassim Bin Hamad Stadium in Doha, Qatar. It finished 1–1 after 90 minutes, 2–2 after extra time, and Napoli won 6–5 in the penalty shootout.

== See also ==
- 2013–14 ACF Fiorentina season
- 2013–14 SSC Napoli season
