= Neto (footballer, born 1989) =

Brazilian footballer (born 1989)

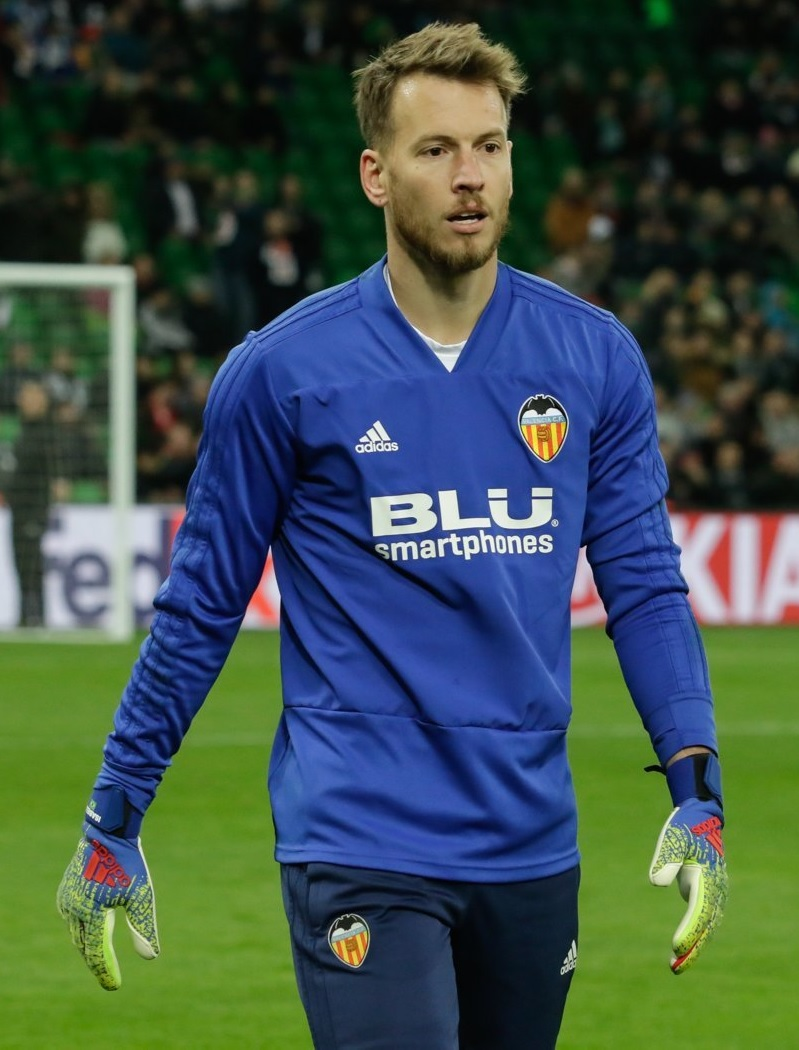
- Neto with Valencia in 2019

Personal information
- Full name: Norberto Murara Neto
- Date of birth: 19 July 1989 (age 37)
- Place of birth: Araxá, Brazil
- Height: 1.91 m (6 ft 3 in)
- Position: Goalkeeper

Team information
- Current team: Juventus
- Number: 33

Youth career
- Cruzeiro
- 2003–2009: Athletico Paranaense

Senior career*
Years	Team	Apps	(Gls)
2009–2011	Athletico Paranaense	36	(0)
2011–2015	Fiorentina	72	(0)
2015–2017	Juventus	11	(0)
2017–2019	Valencia	67	(0)
2019–2022	Barcelona	12	(0)
2022–2025	Bournemouth	61	(0)
2024–2025	→ Arsenal (loan)	0	(0)
2025–2026	Botafogo	14	(0)
2026–	Juventus	0	(0)

International career
2012	Brazil U23	6	(0)
2018	Brazil	1	(0)
Medal record
Representing Brazil
Men's Football
Silver medal – second place	2012	Team competition
- * Club domestic league appearances and goals as of 28 July 2026

Norberto Murara Neto (born 19 July 1989), commonly known as Neto (Brazilian Portuguese: [ˈnɛtu]), is a Brazilian professional footballer who plays as a goalkeeper for Serie A club Juventus.

Neto began his career with Brazilian side Athletico Paranaense and later played for Italian side Fiorentina. He joined Juventus in 2015, where he won the domestic double in each of his two seasons with the club, serving as a back-up to starter Gianluigi Buffon in the league, but appearing in all of the club's games in both of their victorious Coppa Italia campaigns. In 2017, he played in Spain's La Liga as the first choice for Valencia and as a backup for Barcelona. He joined Bournemouth in 2022, becoming club captain in 2023.

He was first called up for the Brazil national team in 2010 but did not earn his first cap until 2018. He won a silver medal at the 2012 Olympics and was part of the nation's squad at the 2015 Copa América.

== Club career ==
=== Athlético Paranaense ===
Born in Araxá, Minas Gerais, Neto moved from his state's Cruzeiro to Athletico Paranaense as a teenager. He made his professional debut at 19 in the Campeonato Brasileiro Série A due to the suspension of first-choice Rodrigo Galatto. He kept a clean sheet in a 3–0 home win over Grêmio Barueri on 16 August 2009. His only other appearance of the season came on 29 November in the final home game, as a half-time substitute for Galatto in a 2–0 win over Botafogo at the Arena da Baixada.

After Galatto and second-choice Vinícius left Atlético-PR, Neto became the first-choice goalkeeper for the 2010 season. In the opener on 9 May, he was sent off in a 2–1 loss at Corinthians for a foul on Dentinho; following a two-match suspension, he returned and started every game for the club until October, when he was forced to miss several games after being called up for the Brazil national team.

=== Fiorentina ===
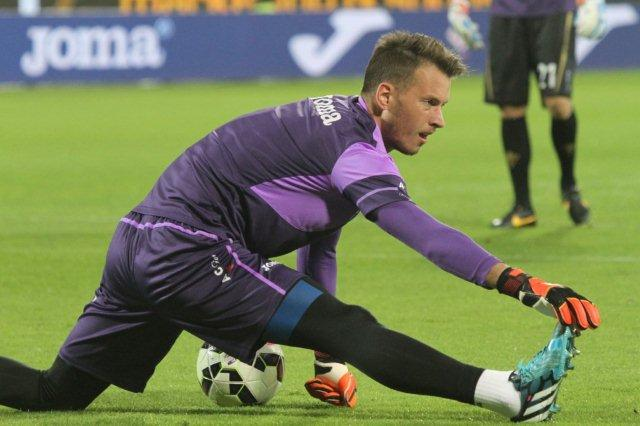
Neto training with Fiorentina in 2014

Neto agreed a deal to play for Italian club Fiorentina on 5 January 2011, signing the contract three days later for a €3.5 million transfer fee split into three payments and Atlético-PR retaining 25% of his economic rights. Second-choice to Artur Boruc, he made his debut in the 4th round of the 2011–12 Coppa Italia on 24 November 2011 at home to fellow Tuscans Empoli, winning 2–1. He debuted in the Serie A on 29 April in a 2–0 loss at Atalanta.

In 2013–14, with Boruc and Emiliano Viviano now having left the Stadio Artemio Franchi, Neto became the first-choice goalkeeper for La Viola. He made his continental debut in their run to the last 16 of the UEFA Europa League, playing nine games; this started with a 2–1 win at Grasshopper Zürich in the play-off on 22 August and concluded with elimination by rivals Juventus in March 2014. On 3 May, he played in the 2014 Coppa Italia Final, which Fiorentina lost 3–1 to Napoli.

Fiorentina reached the semi-finals of the 2014–15 UEFA Europa League, where they were eliminated by eventual winners Sevilla. Neto played seven of the eight knockout games, with Romanian Ciprian Tătărușanu playing the preceding fixtures before injury.

=== Juventus ===
Neto joined Juventus on a four-year contract on 3 July 2015, after his Fiorentina deal expired. He debuted on 23 September, starting in a 1–1 Serie A home draw against Frosinone. On 16 December, he achieved his first clean sheet with the club in a 4–0 win over cross-city rivals Torino during a Coppa Italia match. He kept his first league clean sheet in the final fixture on 14 May 2016, a 5–0 home win over Sampdoria, as Juventus celebrated their Serie A title victory. A week later, he kept another clean sheet to win the cup final 1–0 against A.C. Milan in Rome's Stadio Olimpico.

In his second season with the club, Neto made his UEFA Champions League debut on 7 December 2016, in Juventus's final group match, keeping a clean sheet in a 2–0 home win over Dinamo Zagreb. Although he served as a back-up to Gianluigi Buffon in the league, he was the team's starting goalkeeper in the Coppa Italia, featuring in all their matches, including the 2–0 victory over Lazio in the final on 17 May 2017. Juventus won their 12th Coppa Italia title, becoming the first team to win three consecutive championships and league-cup doubles.

=== Valencia ===
On 7 July 2017, Neto joined Valencia on a four-year contract in a €7 million deal, plus an additional €2 million in conditional bonuses. He debuted for the club on 18 August, starting in a 1–0 La Liga home win against Las Palmas.

While Neto was the first-choice goalkeeper in both league seasons at the Mestalla Stadium, Jaume Doménech played all the Copa del Rey games, including the 2–1 win over Barcelona in the 2019 final.

=== Barcelona ===
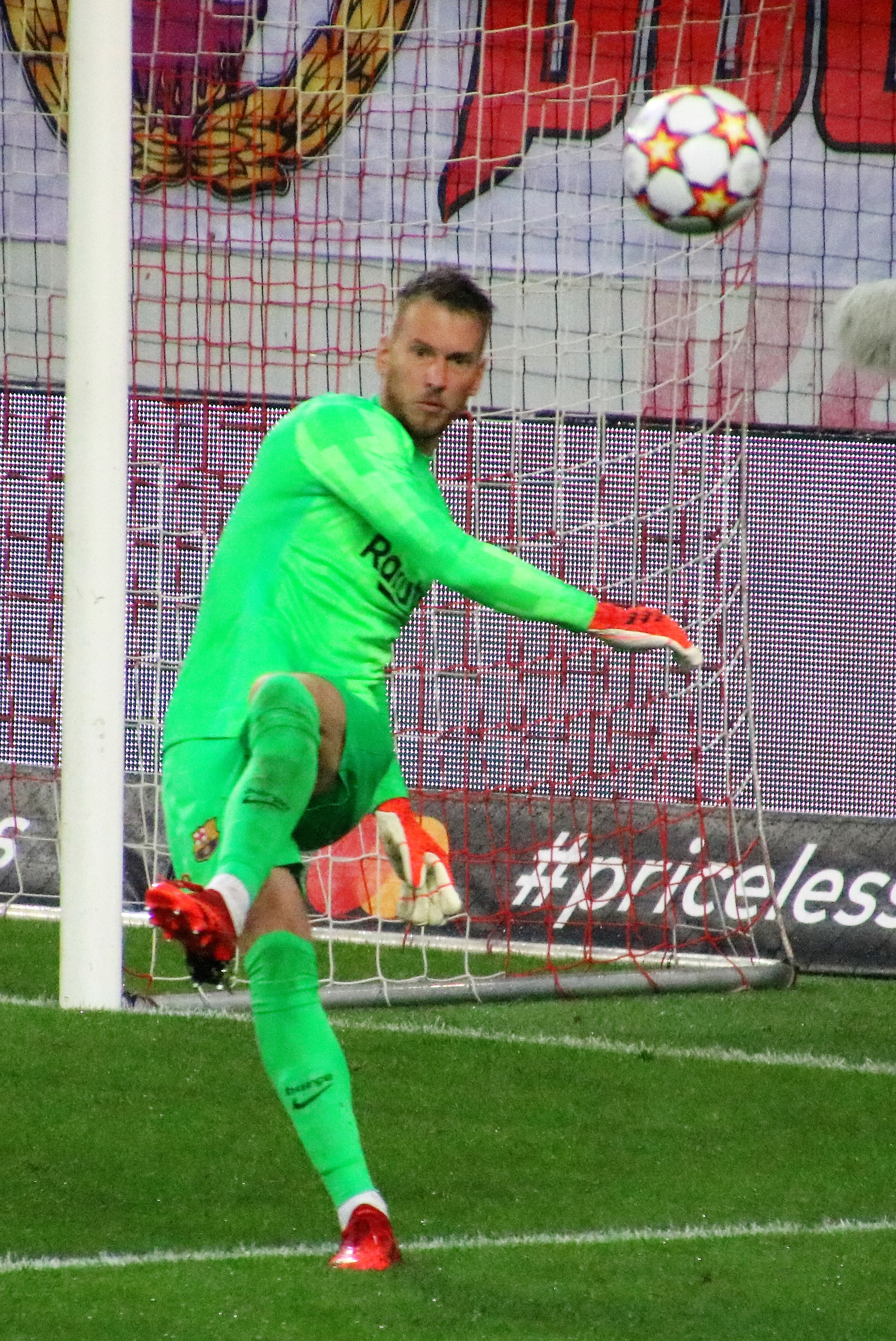
Neto playing against Red Bull Salzburg in August 2021

On 27 June 2019, it was announced that Neto would move to Barcelona for €26m plus €9m in add-ons. He arrived as back-up for Marc-André ter Stegen, a day after fellow goalkeeper Jasper Cillessen moved in the other direction. He debuted on 10 December in a 2–1 win at Inter Milan at the end of the Champions League group stage, with manager Ernesto Valverde resting most of his key players. He played two league games over the season, starting on 4 January 2020 in the Derbi Barceloní against Espanyol, a 2–2 away draw while Ter Stegen was injured.

Neto played in Barcelona's first six league games and three of the six UEFA Champions League group stage matches of 2020–21, as his German teammate took until the end of October to recover from a knee injury; this included a 3–1 home loss to Real Madrid in El Clásico on 24 October.

=== Bournemouth ===
On 7 August 2022, Neto joined Premier League club Bournemouth on a free transfer, signing a 12-month contract. He was initially back-up to Mark Travers. He debuted on 23 August in the second round of the EFL Cup away to Norwich City, winning on penalties after a 2–2 draw; eight days later, he played his first league game, a goalless draw at home to Wolverhampton Wanderers. He remained first choice until suffering a hamstring injury on 24 October in the 2–0 loss at West Ham United, with Travers replacing him at half time; he returned on 14 January 2023 for a defeat by the same score away to Brentford, and was praised by manager Gary O'Neil for recovering ahead of schedule.

==== Loan to Arsenal ====
On 30 August 2024, Neto joined Arsenal on a season-long loan on deadline day. Neto debuted for Arsenal on 29 January 2025 in their Champions League match against Girona. That was his only appearance for the club, as he departed Arsenal at the end of the season.

=== Botafogo ===
On 8 August 2025, Neto signed a two-year contract with Botafogo. On 14 September, during the club's league loss to São Paulo, he felt pain in his thigh and had to be substituted in the first half. Two days later, imaging tests revealed a complete rupture of the rectus femoris muscle in his right thigh, with an estimated recovery time of twelve to twenty weeks. On 21 September 2025, Neto underwent surgery and three days later began recovery work at Botafogo's Health and Performance Center.

Amid a stint marked by repeated errors, Neto finalized the termination of his contract with Botafogo on 26 June 2026.

=== Return to Juventus ===
On 28 September 2026, Neto returned to Juventus until the end of the 2026–27 season as a replacement for seriously injured Kamil Grabara.

== International career ==
In September 2010, 21-year-old Neto had his first call-up for the Brazil national football team under manager Mano Menezes, who chose several new young players with an eye to the 2012 Olympic tournament. He took no part in the friendlies against Iran in the United Arab Emirates and against Ukraine in England. He was called up again in October to face Argentina in another exhibition in Qatar.

Neto was in the Brazil squad for the 2012 Olympic tournament in Great Britain, playing in their two opening group stage wins over Egypt and Belarus before being replaced by Gabriel as the nation won the silver medal.

Neto was one of seven stand-by players named by Dunga for the senior team at the 2015 Copa América, but was eventually called into the main squad after a knee injury to Diego Alves. He remained on the bench as Jefferson played first-choice goalkeeper, and Brazil reached the quarter-finals.

On 12 September 2018, eight years after his first senior call-up, Neto debuted for Brazil when he started a 5–0 friendly win over El Salvador in the United States.

== Career statistics ==
=== Club ===
As of the match played on 15 February 2026

Appearances and goals by club, season and competition
Club	Season	League			State league (Note: Includes Campeonato Carioca)		National cup (Note: Includes Copa do Brasil, Coppa Italia, Copa del Rey)		League cup (Note: Includes EFL Cup)		Continental		Other		Total	
Club	Season	Division	Apps	Goals	Apps	Goals	Apps	Goals	Apps	Goals	Apps	Goals	Apps	Goals	Apps	Goals
Athletico Paranaense	2009	Série A	2	0	—		0	0	—		0	0	—		2	0
Athletico Paranaense	2010	Série A	34	0	—		6	0	—		—		—		40	0
Athletico Paranaense	Total		36	0	—		6	0	—		0	0	—		42	0
Fiorentina	2010–11	Serie A	0	0	—		0	0	—		—		—		0	0
Fiorentina	2011–12	Serie A	2	0	—		2	0	—		—		—		4	0
Fiorentina	2012–13	Serie A	6	0	—		4	0	—		—		—		10	0
Fiorentina	2013–14	Serie A	35	0	—		5	0	—		9 (Note: Appearances in UEFA Europa League)	0	—		49	0
Fiorentina	2014–15	Serie A	29	0	—		2	0	—		7	0	—		38	0
Fiorentina	Total		72	0	—		13	0	—		16	0	—		101	0
Juventus	2015–16	Serie A	3	0	—		5	0	—		0	0	0	0	8	0
Juventus	2016–17	Serie A	8	0	—		5	0	—		1 (Note: Appearance(s) in UEFA Champions League)	0	0	0	14	0
Juventus	Total		11	0	—		10	0	—		1	0	0	0	22	0
Valencia	2017–18	La Liga	33	0	—		0	0	—		—		—		33	0
Valencia	2018–19	La Liga	34	0	—		0	0	—		13 (Note: Eight appearances in UEFA Champions League, five appearances in UEFA Europa League)	0	—		47	0
Valencia	Total		67	0	—		0	0	—		13	0	—		80	0
Barcelona	2019–20	La Liga	2	0	—		1	0	—		1	0	1 (Note: Appearance in Supercopa de España)	0	5	0
Barcelona	2020–21	La Liga	7	0	—		2	0	—		3	0	0	0	12	0
Barcelona	2021–22	La Liga	3	0	—		1	0	—		0	0	0	0	4	0
Barcelona	Total		12	0	—		4	0	—		4	0	1	0	21	0
Bournemouth	2022–23	Premier League	27	0	—		0	0	1	0	—		—		28	0
Bournemouth	2023–24	Premier League	32	0	—		0	0	0	0	—		—		32	0
Bournemouth	2024–25	Premier League	2	0	—		—		1	0	—		—		3	0
Bournemouth	Total		61	0	—		0	0	2	0	—		—		63	0
Arsenal (loan)	2024–25	Premier League	0	0	—		0	0	—		1	0	—		1	0
Botafogo	2025	Série A	0	0	—		1	0	—		0	0	—		1	0
Botafogo	2026	Série A	3	0	2	0	0	0	—		0	0	—		5	0
Botafogo	Total		3	0	2	0	1	0	—		0	0	—		6	0
Career total			262	0	2	0	34	0	2	0	35	0	1	0	336	0

=== International ===
As of match played 11 September 2018

Appearances and goals by national team and year
National team	Year	Apps	Goals
Brazil	2018	1	0
Total		1	0

== Honours ==
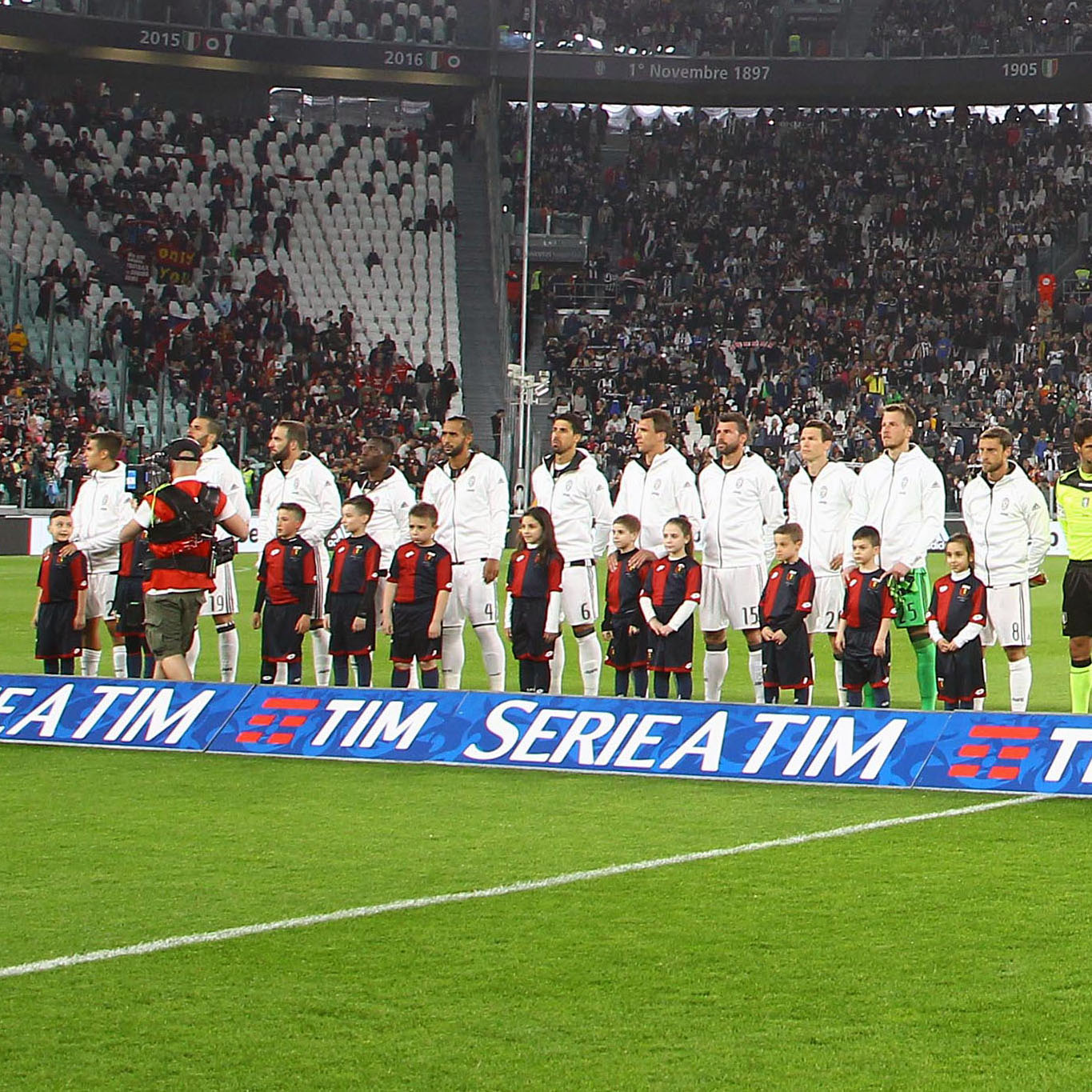
Neto (in green shorts and socks) lining up for Juventus in April 2017, during a double-winning season

Juventus

- Serie A: 2015–16, 2016–17
- Coppa Italia: 2015–16, 2016–17
- Supercoppa Italiana: 2015
- UEFA Champions League runner-up: 2016–17

Valencia

- Copa del Rey: 2018–19

Barcelona

- Copa del Rey: 2020–21

Brazil U23

- Olympic Silver Medal: 2012
