= 2013–14 UEFA Europa League knockout phase =

International football competition

The knockout phase of the 2013–14 UEFA Europa League began on 20 February and concluded on 14 May 2014 with the final at Juventus Stadium in Turin, Italy. A total of 32 teams competed in the knockout phase.

Times up to 29 March 2014 (round of 16) were CET (UTC+1), thereafter (quarter-finals and beyond) times were CEST (UTC+2).

== Round and draw dates ==
All draws were held at UEFA headquarters in Nyon, Switzerland.

| Round | Draw date and time | First leg | Second leg |
|---|---|---|---|
| Round of 32 | 16 December 2013, 13:00 | 20 February 2014 | 27 February 2014 |
| Round of 16 | 16 December 2013, 13:00 | 13 March 2014 | 20 March 2014 |
| Quarter-finals | 21 March 2014, 13:00 | 3 April 2014 | 10 April 2014 |
| Semi-finals | 11 April 2014, 12:00 | 24 April 2014 | 1 May 2014 |
| Final | 11 April 2014, 12:00 | 14 May 2014 at Juventus Stadium, Turin | |

Matches may also be played on Tuesdays or Wednesdays instead of the regular Thursdays due to scheduling conflicts.

== Format ==
The knockout phase involved 32 teams: the 24 teams which qualified as winners and runners-up of each of the twelve groups in the group stage, and the eight third-placed teams from the Champions League group stage.

Each tie in the knockout phase, apart from the final, was played over two legs, with each team playing one leg at home. The team that scored more goals on aggregate over the two legs advanced to the next round. If the aggregate score was level, the away goals rule was applied, i.e., the team that scored more goals away from home over the two legs advanced. If away goals were also equal, then thirty minutes of extra time was played. The away goals rule was again applied after extra time, i.e., if there were goals scored during extra time and the aggregate score was still level, the visiting team advanced by virtue of more away goals scored. If no goals were scored during extra time, the tie was decided by penalty shoot-out. In the final, which was played as a single match, if scores were level at the end of normal time, extra time was played, followed by penalty shoot-out if scores remained tied.

The mechanism of the draws for each round was as follows:

- In the draw for the round of 32, the twelve group winners and the four third-placed teams from the Champions League group stage with the better group records were seeded, and the twelve group runners-up and the other four third-placed teams from the Champions League group stage were unseeded. The seeded teams were drawn against the unseeded teams, with the seeded teams hosting the second leg. Teams from the same group or the same association could not be drawn against each other.
- In the draws for the round of 16 onwards, there were no seedings, and teams from the same group or the same association could be drawn against each other.

== Qualified teams ==
Key to colours
Seeded in round of 32 draw
Unseeded in round of 32 draw

=== Europa League group stage winners and runners-up ===
| Group | Winners | Runners-up |
|---|---|---|
| A | (Spain) Valencia | (England) Swansea City |
| B | (Bulgaria) Ludogorets Razgrad | (Ukraine) Chornomorets Odesa |
| C | (Austria) Red Bull Salzburg | (Denmark) Esbjerg |
| D | (Russia) Rubin Kazan | (Slovenia) Maribor |
| E | (Italy) Fiorentina | (Ukraine) Dnipro Dnipropetrovsk |
| F | (Germany) Eintracht Frankfurt | (Israel) Maccabi Tel Aviv |
| G | (Belgium) Genk | (Ukraine) Dynamo Kyiv |
| H | (Spain) Sevilla | (Czech Republic) Slovan Liberec |
| I | (France) Lyon | (Spain) Real Betis |
| J | (Turkey) Trabzonspor | (Italy) Lazio |
| K | (England) Tottenham Hotspur | (Russia) Anzhi Makhachkala |
| L | (Netherlands) AZ | (Greece) PAOK |

=== Champions League group stage third-placed teams ===
| Grp | Team | Pld | W | D | L | GF | GA | GD | Pts |
|---|---|---|---|---|---|---|---|---|---|
| F | (Italy) Napoli | 6 | 4 | 0 | 2 | 10 | 9 | +1 | 12 |
| C | (Portugal) Benfica | 6 | 3 | 1 | 2 | 8 | 8 | 0 | 10 |
| A | (Ukraine) Shakhtar Donetsk | 6 | 2 | 2 | 2 | 7 | 6 | +1 | 8 |
| E | (Switzerland) Basel | 6 | 2 | 2 | 2 | 5 | 6 | −1 | 8 |
| H | (Netherlands) Ajax | 6 | 2 | 2 | 2 | 5 | 8 | −3 | 8 |
| B | (Italy) Juventus | 6 | 1 | 3 | 2 | 9 | 9 | 0 | 6 |
| G | (Portugal) Porto | 6 | 1 | 2 | 3 | 4 | 7 | −3 | 5 |
| D | (Czech Republic) Viktoria Plzeň | 6 | 1 | 0 | 5 | 6 | 17 | −11 | 3 |

Rules for classification: 1. Points; 2. Goal difference; 3. Goals scored; 4. Away goals scored; 5. Wins; 6. Away wins; 7. Club coefficient.

== Bracket ==
Round of 32
(Portugal) Porto (a) | 2 | 3 | 5
(Germany) Eintracht Frankfurt | 2 | 3 | 5
(England) Swansea City | 0 | 1 | 1
(Italy) Napoli | 0 | 3 | 3
(Slovenia) Maribor | 2 | 1 | 3
(Spain) Sevilla | 2 | 2 | 4
(Spain) Real Betis | 1 | 2 | 3
(Russia) Rubin Kazan | 1 | 0 | 1
(Israel) Maccabi Tel Aviv | 0 | 0 | 0
(Switzerland) Basel | 0 | 3 | 3
(Netherlands) Ajax | 0 | 1 | 1
(Austria) Red Bull Salzburg | 3 | 3 | 6
(Italy) Lazio | 0 | 3 | 3
(Bulgaria) Ludogorets Razgrad | 1 | 3 | 4
(Ukraine) Dynamo Kyiv | 0 | 0 | 0
(Spain) Valencia | 2 | 0 | 2
(Czech Republic) Slovan Liberec | 0 | 1 | 1
(Netherlands) AZ | 1 | 1 | 2
(Russia) Anzhi Makhachkala | 0 | 2 | 2
(Belgium) Genk | 0 | 0 | 0
(Ukraine) Dnipro Dnipropetrovsk | 1 | 1 | 2
(England) Tottenham Hotspur | 0 | 3 | 3
(Greece) PAOK | 0 | 0 | 0
(Portugal) Benfica | 1 | 3 | 4
(Ukraine) Chornomorets Odesa | 0 | 0 | 0
(France) Lyon | 0 | 1 | 1
(Czech Republic) Viktoria Plzeň | 1 | 2 | 3
(Ukraine) Shakhtar Donetsk | 1 | 1 | 2
(Italy) Juventus | 2 | 2 | 4
(Turkey) Trabzonspor | 0 | 0 | 0
(Denmark) Esbjerg | 1 | 1 | 2
(Italy) Fiorentina | 3 | 1 | 4

Round of 16
(Portugal) Porto | 1 | 2 | 3
(Italy) Napoli | 0 | 2 | 2
(Spain) Sevilla (p) | 0 | 2 | 2 (4)
(Spain) Real Betis | 2 | 0 | 2 (3)
(Switzerland) Basel | 0 | 2 | 2
(Austria) Red Bull Salzburg | 0 | 1 | 1
(Bulgaria) Ludogorets Razgrad | 0 | 0 | 0
(Spain) Valencia | 3 | 1 | 4
(Netherlands) AZ | 1 | 0 | 1
(Russia) Anzhi Makhachkala | 0 | 0 | 0
(England) Tottenham Hotspur | 1 | 2 | 3
(Portugal) Benfica | 3 | 2 | 5
(France) Lyon | 4 | 1 | 5
(Czech Republic) Viktoria Plzeň | 1 | 2 | 3
(Italy) Juventus | 1 | 1 | 2
(Italy) Fiorentina | 1 | 0 | 1

Quarter-finals
(Portugal) Porto | 1 | 1 | 2
(Spain) Sevilla | 0 | 4 | 4
(Switzerland) Basel | 3 | 0 | 3
(Spain) Valencia (a.e.t.) | 0 | 5 | 5
(Netherlands) AZ | 0 | 0 | 0
(Portugal) Benfica | 1 | 2 | 3
(France) Lyon | 0 | 1 | 1
(Italy) Juventus | 1 | 2 | 3

Semi-finals
(Spain) Sevilla (a) | 2 | 1 | 3
(Spain) Valencia | 0 | 3 | 3
(Portugal) Benfica | 2 | 0 | 2
(Italy) Juventus | 1 | 0 | 1

Final
14 May – Turin
(Spain) Sevilla (p) | 0 (4)
(Portugal) Benfica | 0 (2)

== Round of 32 ==
The draw for the round of 32 was held on 16 December 2013.

=== Summary ===
The first legs were played on 20 February, and the second legs were played on 27 February 2014.

| Team 1 | Agg. | Team 2 | 1st leg | 2nd leg |
|---|---|---|---|---|
| Dnipro Dnipropetrovsk (Ukraine) | 2–3 | (England) Tottenham Hotspur | 1–0 | 1–3 |
| Real Betis (Spain) | 3–1 | (Russia) Rubin Kazan | 1–1 | 2–0 |
| Swansea City (England) | 1–3 | (Italy) Napoli | 0–0 | 1–3 |
| Juventus (Italy) | 4–0 | (Turkey) Trabzonspor | 2–0 | 2–0 |
| Maribor (Slovenia) | 3–4 | (Spain) Sevilla | 2–2 | 1–2 |
| Viktoria Plzeň (Czech Republic) | 3–2 | (Ukraine) Shakhtar Donetsk | 1–1 | 2–1 |
| Chornomorets Odesa (Ukraine) | 0–1 | (France) Lyon | 0–0 | 0–1 |
| Lazio (Italy) | 3–4 | (Bulgaria) Ludogorets Razgrad | 0–1 | 3–3 |
| Esbjerg (Denmark) | 2–4 | (Italy) Fiorentina | 1–3 | 1–1 |
| Ajax (Netherlands) | 1–6 | (Austria) Red Bull Salzburg | 0–3 | 1–3 |
| Maccabi Tel Aviv (Israel) | 0–3 | (Switzerland) Basel | 0–0 | 0–3 |
| Porto (Portugal) | 5–5 (a) | (Germany) Eintracht Frankfurt | 2–2 | 3–3 |
| Anzhi Makhachkala (Russia) | 2–0 | (Belgium) Genk | 0–0 | 2–0 |
| Dynamo Kyiv (Ukraine) | 0–2 | (Spain) Valencia | 0–2 | 0–0 |
| PAOK (Greece) | 0–4 | (Portugal) Benfica | 0–1 | 0–3 |
| Slovan Liberec (Czech Republic) | 1–2 | (Netherlands) AZ | 0–1 | 1–1 |

=== Matches ===
20 February 2014
19:00

| Dnipro Dnipropetrovsk (Ukraine) | 1–0 | (England) Tottenham Hotspur |
|---|---|---|
| Konoplyanka 81' (pen.) | Report |

Dnipro-Arena, Dnipropetrovsk
Attendance: 22,356
Referee: Antonio Mateu Lahoz (Spain)
27 February 2014
21:05

| Tottenham Hotspur (England) | 3–1 | (Ukraine) Dnipro Dnipropetrovsk |
|---|---|---|
| Eriksen 56'; Adebayor 65', 69' | Report | Zozulya 48' |

White Hart Lane, London
Attendance: 34,815
Referee: Antony Gautier (France)

Tottenham Hotspur won 3–2 on aggregate.

20 February 2014
21:05

| Real Betis (Spain) | 1–1 | (Russia) Rubin Kazan |
|---|---|---|
| Dídac 3' | Report | Eremenko 74' (pen.) |

Benito Villamarín, Seville
Attendance: 11,825
Referee: Serge Gumienny (Belgium)
27 February 2014
18:00

| Rubin Kazan (Russia) | 0–2 | (Spain) Real Betis |
|---|---|---|
| | Report | Nono 45'; Castro 64' |

Rubin Stadium, Kazan (Note: Rubin Kazan played their home match at Rubin Stadium, Kazan instead of their regular stadium, Central Stadium, Kazan.)
Attendance: 5,102
Referee: Michael Oliver (England)

Real Betis won 3–1 on aggregate.

20 February 2014
21:05

| Swansea City (England) | 0–0 | (Italy) Napoli |
|---|---|---|
| | Report |

Liberty Stadium, Swansea
Attendance: 19,567
Referee: Ivan Bebek (Croatia)
27 February 2014
19:00

| Napoli (Italy) | 3–1 | (England) Swansea City |
|---|---|---|
| Insigne 17'; Higuaín 78'; Inler 90+3' | Report | De Guzmán 30' |

Stadio San Paolo, Naples
Attendance: 31,121
Referee: Ovidiu Hațegan (Romania)

Napoli won 3–1 on aggregate.

20 February 2014
19:00

| Juventus (Italy) | 2–0 | (Turkey) Trabzonspor |
|---|---|---|
| Osvaldo 15'; Pogba 90+4' | Report |

Juventus Stadium, Turin
Attendance: 35,436
Referee: Aleksei Kulbakov (Belarus)
27 February 2014
21:05

| Trabzonspor (Turkey) | 0–2 | (Italy) Juventus |
|---|---|---|
| | Report | Vidal 18'; Osvaldo 33' |

Hüseyin Avni Aker Stadium, Trabzon
Attendance: 20,686
Referee: Pavel Královec (Czech Republic)

Juventus won 4–0 on aggregate.

20 February 2014
21:05

| Maribor (Slovenia) | 2–2 | (Spain) Sevilla |
|---|---|---|
| Tavares 33'; Vršič 81' | Report | Gameiro 47'; Fazio 72' |

Ljudski vrt, Maribor
Attendance: 12,700
Referee: István Vad (Hungary)
27 February 2014
19:00

| Sevilla (Spain) | 2–1 | (Slovenia) Maribor |
|---|---|---|
| Reyes 42'; Gameiro 59' | Report | Vršič 90+2' |

Ramón Sánchez Pizjuán, Seville
Attendance: 21,562
Referee: Luca Banti (Italy)

Sevilla won 4–3 on aggregate.

20 February 2014
21:05

| Viktoria Plzeň (Czech Republic) | 1–1 | (Ukraine) Shakhtar Donetsk |
|---|---|---|
| Tecl 62' | Report | Adriano 65' |

Doosan Arena, Plzeň
Attendance: 11,179
Referee: Anastasios Sidiropoulos (Greece)
27 February 2014
19:00

| Shakhtar Donetsk (Ukraine) | 1–2 | (Czech Republic) Viktoria Plzeň |
|---|---|---|
| Adriano 88' | Report | Kolář 29'; Petržela 33' |

Donbas Arena, Donetsk
Attendance: 36,729
Referee: Pol van Boekel (Netherlands)

Viktoria Plzeň won 3–2 on aggregate.

20 February 2014
19:00

| Chornomorets Odesa (Ukraine) | 0–0 | (France) Lyon |
|---|---|---|
| | Report |

Chornomorets Stadium, Odesa
Attendance: 28,456
Referee: Craig Thomson (Scotland)
27 February 2014
21:05

| Lyon (France) | 1–0 | (Ukraine) Chornomorets Odesa |
|---|---|---|
| Lacazette 80' | Report |

Stade de Gerland, Lyon
Attendance: 25,039
Referee: Aleksandar Stavrev (Macedonia)

Lyon won 1–0 on aggregate.

20 February 2014
21:05

| Lazio (Italy) | 0–1 | (Bulgaria) Ludogorets Razgrad |
|---|---|---|
| | Report | Bezjak 45' |

Stadio Olimpico, Rome
Attendance: 7,459
Referee: Felix Zwayer (Germany)
27 February 2014
19:00

| Ludogorets Razgrad (Bulgaria) | 3–3 | (Italy) Lazio |
|---|---|---|
| Bezjak 67'; Zlatinski 78'; Juninho Quixadá 88' | Report | Keita 1'; Perea 54'; Klose 82' |

Vasil Levski National Stadium, Sofia (Note: Ludogorets Razgrad played their home match at Vasil Levski National Stadium, Sofia instead of their regular stadium, Ludogorets Arena, Razgrad.)
Attendance: 28,742
Referee: Olegário Benquerença (Portugal)

Ludogorets Razgrad won 4–3 on aggregate.

20 February 2014
19:00

| Esbjerg (Denmark) | 1–3 | (Italy) Fiorentina |
|---|---|---|
| Pušić 10' | Report | Matri 9'; Iličić 15'; Aquilani 37' (pen.) |

Blue Water Arena, Esbjerg
Attendance: 11,033
Referee: Sergei Karasev (Russia)
27 February 2014
21:05

| Fiorentina (Italy) | 1–1 | (Denmark) Esbjerg |
|---|---|---|
| Iličić 47' | Report | Vestergaard 90+1' |

Stadio Artemio Franchi, Florence
Attendance: 13,815
Referee: Marijo Strahonja (Croatia)

Fiorentina won 4–2 on aggregate.

20 February 2014
21:05

| Ajax (Netherlands) | 0–3 | (Austria) Red Bull Salzburg |
|---|---|---|
| | Report | Soriano 14' (pen.), 35'; Mané 21' |

Amsterdam Arena, Amsterdam
Attendance: 51,240
Referee: Clément Turpin (France)
27 February 2014
19:00

| Red Bull Salzburg (Austria) | 3–1 | (Netherlands) Ajax |
|---|---|---|
| Van der Hoorn 56' (o.g.); Mané 66'; Soriano 77' | Report | Klaassen 82' |

Red Bull Arena, Wals-Siezenheim
Attendance: 29,320
Referee: Paolo Tagliavento (Italy)

Red Bull Salzburg won 6–1 on aggregate.

20 February 2014
21:05

| Maccabi Tel Aviv (Israel) | 0–0 | (Switzerland) Basel |
|---|---|---|
| | Report |

Bloomfield Stadium, Tel Aviv
Attendance: 13,519
Referee: David Fernández Borbalán (Spain)
27 February 2014
19:00

| Basel (Switzerland) | 3–0 | (Israel) Maccabi Tel Aviv |
|---|---|---|
| Stocker 17'; Streller 60', 71' | Report |

St. Jakob-Park, Basel
Attendance: 15,212
Referee: Ivan Bebek (Croatia)

Basel won 3–0 on aggregate.

20 February 2014
21:05

| Porto (Portugal) | 2–2 | (Germany) Eintracht Frankfurt |
|---|---|---|
| Quaresma 44'; Varela 68' | Report | Joselu 72'; Alex Sandro 77' (o.g.) |

Estádio do Dragão, Porto
Attendance: 25,107
Referee: Matej Jug (Slovenia)
27 February 2014
19:00

| Eintracht Frankfurt (Germany) | 3–3 | (Portugal) Porto |
|---|---|---|
| Aigner 37'; Meier 52', 76' | Report | Mangala 58', 71'; Ghilas 86' |

Commerzbank-Arena, Frankfurt am Main
Attendance: 48,000
Referee: Björn Kuipers (Netherlands)

5–5 on aggregate; Porto won on away goals.

20 February 2014
18:00

| Anzhi Makhachkala (Russia) | 0–0 | (Belgium) Genk |
|---|---|---|
| | Report |

Saturn Stadium, Ramenskoye (Note: Anzhi Makhachkala played their home match at Saturn Stadium, Ramenskoye instead of their regular stadium, Anzhi-Arena, Makhachkala.)
Attendance: 3,168
Referee: Alon Yefet (Israel)
27 February 2014
21:05

| Genk (Belgium) | 0–2 | (Russia) Anzhi Makhachkala |
|---|---|---|
| | Report | Tshimanga 64' (o.g.); Aliyev 71' |

Cristal Arena, Genk
Attendance: 10,176
Referee: Manuel Gräfe (Germany)

Anzhi Makhachkala won 2–0 on aggregate.

20 February 2014
19:00

| Dynamo Kyiv (Ukraine) | 0–2 | (Spain) Valencia |
|---|---|---|
| | Report | Vargas 79'; Feghouli 90+1' |

GSP Stadium, Nicosia, Cyprus (Note: On 19 February 2014, UEFA announced that it had decided to change the venue of the Dynamo Kyiv v Valencia match from Olympic Stadium, Kyiv, to GSP Stadium, Nicosia, Cyprus, due to riots in Kyiv.)
Attendance: 3,711
Referee: Liran Liany (Israel)
27 February 2014
21:05

| Valencia (Spain) | 0–0 | (Ukraine) Dynamo Kyiv |
|---|---|---|
| | Report |

Mestalla, Valencia
Attendance: 26,261
Referee: Deniz Aytekin (Germany)

Valencia won 2–0 on aggregate.

20 February 2014
19:00

| PAOK (Greece) | 0–1 | (Portugal) Benfica |
|---|---|---|
| | Report | Lima 59' |

Toumba Stadium, Thessaloniki
Attendance: 24,670
Referee: Wolfgang Stark (Germany)
27 February 2014
21:05

| Benfica (Portugal) | 3–0 | (Greece) PAOK |
|---|---|---|
| Gaitán 70'; Lima 78' (pen.); Marković 79' | Report |

Estádio da Luz, Lisbon
Attendance: 31,058
Referee: Szymon Marciniak (Poland)

Benfica won 4–0 on aggregate.

20 February 2014
19:00

| Slovan Liberec (Czech Republic) | 0–1 | (Netherlands) AZ |
|---|---|---|
| | Report | Viergever 89' |

Stadion u Nisy, Liberec
Attendance: 6,790
Referee: Alexandru Tudor (Romania)
27 February 2014
21:05

| AZ (Netherlands) | 1–1 | (Czech Republic) Slovan Liberec |
|---|---|---|
| Viergever 19' | Report | Budnik 72' |

AFAS Stadion, Alkmaar
Attendance: 10,166
Referee: Serhiy Boyko (Ukraine)

AZ won 2–1 on aggregate.

== Round of 16 ==
The draw for the round of 16 was held on 16 December 2013, immediately after the round of 32 draw.

=== Summary ===
The first legs were played on 13 March, and the second legs were played on 20 March 2014.

| Team 1 | Agg. | Team 2 | 1st leg | 2nd leg |
|---|---|---|---|---|
| AZ (Netherlands) | 1–0 | (Russia) Anzhi Makhachkala | 1–0 | 0–0 |
| Ludogorets Razgrad (Bulgaria) | 0–4 | (Spain) Valencia | 0–3 | 0–1 |
| Porto (Portugal) | 3–2 | (Italy) Napoli | 1–0 | 2–2 |
| Lyon (France) | 5–3 | (Czech Republic) Viktoria Plzeň | 4–1 | 1–2 |
| Sevilla (Spain) | 2–2 (4–3 p) | (Spain) Real Betis | 0–2 | 2–0 (a.e.t.) |
| Tottenham Hotspur (England) | 3–5 | (Portugal) Benfica | 1–3 | 2–2 |
| Basel (Switzerland) | 2–1 | (Austria) Red Bull Salzburg | 0–0 | 2–1 |
| Juventus (Italy) | 2–1 | (Italy) Fiorentina | 1–1 | 1–0 |

=== Matches ===
13 March 2014
21:05

| AZ (Netherlands) | 1–0 | (Russia) Anzhi Makhachkala |
|---|---|---|
| Jóhannsson 29' (pen.) | Report |

AFAS Stadion, Alkmaar
Attendance: 9,653
Referee: Daniele Orsato (Italy)
20 March 2014
18:00

| Anzhi Makhachkala (Russia) | 0–0 | (Netherlands) AZ |
|---|---|---|
| | Report |

Saturn Stadium, Ramenskoye
Attendance: 3,896
Referee: Craig Thomson (Scotland)

AZ won 1–0 on aggregate.

13 March 2014
19:00

| Ludogorets Razgrad (Bulgaria) | 0–3 | (Spain) Valencia |
|---|---|---|
| | Report | Barragán 5'; Cartabia 33'; Senderos 59' |

Vasil Levski National Stadium, Sofia
Attendance: 41,085
Referee: Clément Turpin (France)
20 March 2014
19:00

| Valencia (Spain) | 1–0 | (Bulgaria) Ludogorets Razgrad |
|---|---|---|
| Alcácer 59' | Report |

Mestalla, Valencia
Attendance: 18,429
Referee: Anastasios Sidiropoulos (Greece)

Valencia won 4–0 on aggregate.

13 March 2014
19:00

| Porto (Portugal) | 1–0 | (Italy) Napoli |
|---|---|---|
| Martínez 57' | Report |

Estádio do Dragão, Porto
Attendance: 25,520
Referee: Pavel Královec (Czech Republic)
20 March 2014
21:05

| Napoli (Italy) | 2–2 | (Portugal) Porto |
|---|---|---|
| Pandev 21'; Zapata 90+2' | Report | Ghilas 69'; Quaresma 76' |

Stadio San Paolo, Naples
Attendance: 54,145
Referee: Martin Atkinson (England)

Porto won 3–2 on aggregate.

13 March 2014
21:05

| Lyon (France) | 4–1 | (Czech Republic) Viktoria Plzeň |
|---|---|---|
| Fofana 12', 70'; Lacazette 53'; Mvuemba 61' | Report | Hořava 2' |

Stade de Gerland, Lyon
Attendance: 28,248
Referee: Antonio Mateu Lahoz (Spain)
20 March 2014
19:00

| Viktoria Plzeň (Czech Republic) | 2–1 | (France) Lyon |
|---|---|---|
| Kolář 60'; Tecl 62' | Report | Gomis 45+2' |

Doosan Arena, Plzeň
Attendance: 10,352
Referee: Szymon Marciniak (Poland)

Lyon won 5–3 on aggregate.

13 March 2014
21:05

| Sevilla (Spain) | 0–2 | (Spain) Real Betis |
|---|---|---|
| | Report | Léo Baptistão 15'; Sevilla 77' |

Ramón Sánchez Pizjuán, Seville
Attendance: 35,506
Referee: Cüneyt Çakır (Turkey)
20 March 2014
21:05

| Real Betis (Spain) | 0–2 (a.e.t.) | (Spain) Sevilla |
|---|---|---|
| | Report | Reyes 20'; Bacca 75' |
Penalties
| Castro (penalty scored); Sevilla (penalty scored); Amaya (penalty scored); N'Diaye (penalty missed); Nono (penalty missed) | 3–4 | (penalty missed) Vitolo; (penalty scored) Coke; (penalty scored) Gameiro; (penalty scored) Moreno; (penalty scored) Rakitić |

Benito Villamarín, Seville
Attendance: 48,000
Referee: Pedro Proença (Portugal)

2–2 on aggregate; Sevilla won 4–3 on penalties.

13 March 2014
21:05

| Tottenham Hotspur (England) | 1–3 | (Portugal) Benfica |
|---|---|---|
| Eriksen 64' | Report | Rodrigo 30'; Luisão 58', 84' |

White Hart Lane, London
Attendance: 34,283
Referee: Jonas Eriksson (Sweden)
20 March 2014
19:00

| Benfica (Portugal) | 2–2 | (England) Tottenham Hotspur |
|---|---|---|
| Garay 34'; Lima 90+5' (pen.) | Report | Chadli 78', 79' |

Estádio da Luz, Lisbon
Attendance: 40,990
Referee: Damir Skomina (Slovenia)

Benfica won 5–3 on aggregate.

13 March 2014
19:00

| Basel (Switzerland) | 0–0 | (Austria) Red Bull Salzburg |
|---|---|---|
| | Report |

St. Jakob-Park, Basel
Attendance: 17,027
Referee: Ovidiu Hațegan (Romania)
20 March 2014
21:05

| Red Bull Salzburg (Austria) | 1–2 | (Switzerland) Basel |
|---|---|---|
| Soriano 22' | Report | Streller 50'; Sauro 60' |

Red Bull Arena, Wals-Siezenheim
Attendance: 29,320
Referee: Manuel Gräfe (Germany)

Basel won 2–1 on aggregate.

13 March 2014
21:05

| Juventus (Italy) | 1–1 | (Italy) Fiorentina |
|---|---|---|
| Vidal 3' | Report | Gómez 79' |

Juventus Stadium, Turin
Attendance: 39,610
Referee: Björn Kuipers (Netherlands)
20 March 2014
19:00

| Fiorentina (Italy) | 0–1 | (Italy) Juventus |
|---|---|---|
| | Report | Pirlo 71' |

Stadio Artemio Franchi, Florence
Attendance: 32,633
Referee: Howard Webb (England)

Juventus won 2–1 on aggregate.

== Quarter-finals ==
The draw for the quarter-finals was held on 21 March 2014.

=== Summary ===
The first legs were played on 3 April, and the second legs were played on 10 April 2014.

| Team 1 | Agg. | Team 2 | 1st leg | 2nd leg |
|---|---|---|---|---|
| AZ (Netherlands) | 0–3 | (Portugal) Benfica | 0–1 | 0–2 |
| Lyon (France) | 1–3 | (Italy) Juventus | 0–1 | 1–2 |
| Basel (Switzerland) | 3–5 | (Spain) Valencia | 3–0 | 0–5 (a.e.t.) |
| Porto (Portugal) | 2–4 | (Spain) Sevilla | 1–0 | 1–4 |

=== Matches ===
3 April 2014
21:05

| AZ (Netherlands) | 0–1 | (Portugal) Benfica |
|---|---|---|
| | Report | Salvio 48' |

AFAS Stadion, Alkmaar
Attendance: 16,906
Referee: Svein Oddvar Moen (Norway)
10 April 2014
21:05

| Benfica (Portugal) | 2–0 | (Netherlands) AZ |
|---|---|---|
| Rodrigo 39', 71' | Report |

Estádio da Luz, Lisbon
Attendance: 35,723
Referee: Pavel Královec (Czech Republic)

Benfica won 3–0 on aggregate.

3 April 2014
21:05

| Lyon (France) | 0–1 | (Italy) Juventus |
|---|---|---|
| | Report | Bonucci 85' |

Stade de Gerland, Lyon
Attendance: 37,084
Referee: William Collum (Scotland)
10 April 2014
21:05

| Juventus (Italy) | 2–1 | (France) Lyon |
|---|---|---|
| Pirlo 4'; Umtiti 68' (o.g.) | Report | Briand 18' |

Juventus Stadium, Turin
Attendance: 40,710
Referee: Alberto Undiano Mallenco (Spain)

Juventus won 3–1 on aggregate.

3 April 2014
21:05

| Basel (Switzerland) | 3–0 | (Spain) Valencia |
|---|---|---|
| Delgado 34', 38'; Stocker 90+1' | Report |

St. Jakob-Park, Basel
Attendance: 350 (Note: The Basel v Valencia match was played behind closed doors due to punishment by UEFA.)
Referee: Martin Atkinson (England)
10 April 2014
21:05

| Valencia (Spain) | 5–0 (a.e.t.) | (Switzerland) Basel |
|---|---|---|
| Alcácer 38', 70', 114'; Vargas 42'; Bernat 118' | Report |

Mestalla, Valencia
Attendance: 33,152
Referee: Viktor Kassai (Hungary)

Valencia won 5–3 on aggregate.

3 April 2014
21:05

| Porto (Portugal) | 1–0 | (Spain) Sevilla |
|---|---|---|
| Mangala 31' | Report |

Estádio do Dragão, Porto
Attendance: 31,122
Referee: Wolfgang Stark (Germany)
10 April 2014
21:05

| Sevilla (Spain) | 4–1 | (Portugal) Porto |
|---|---|---|
| Rakitić 5' (pen.); Vitolo 26'; Bacca 29'; Gameiro 79' | Report | Quaresma 90+2' |

Ramón Sánchez Pizjuán, Seville
Attendance: 31,422
Referee: Gianluca Rocchi (Italy)

Sevilla won 4–2 on aggregate.

== Semi-finals ==
The draw for the semi-finals was held on 11 April 2014.

=== Summary ===
The first legs were played on 24 April, and the second legs were played on 1 May 2014.

| Team 1 | Agg. | Team 2 | 1st leg | 2nd leg |
|---|---|---|---|---|
| Sevilla (Spain) | 3–3 (a) | (Spain) Valencia | 2–0 | 1–3 |
| Benfica (Portugal) | 2–1 | (Italy) Juventus | 2–1 | 0–0 |

=== Matches ===
24 April 2014
21:05

| Sevilla (Spain) | 2–0 | (Spain) Valencia |
|---|---|---|
| Mbia 33'; Bacca 36' | Report |

Ramón Sánchez Pizjuán, Seville
Attendance: 33,496
Referee: Damir Skomina (Slovenia)
1 May 2014
21:05

| Valencia (Spain) | 3–1 | (Spain) Sevilla |
|---|---|---|
| Feghouli 14'; Beto 26' (o.g.); Mathieu 69' | Report | Mbia 90+4' |

Mestalla, Valencia
Attendance: 45,938
Referee: Milorad Mažić (Serbia)

3–3 on aggregate; Sevilla won on away goals.

24 April 2014
21:05

| Benfica (Portugal) | 2–1 | (Italy) Juventus |
|---|---|---|
| Garay 3'; Lima 84' | Report | Tevez 73' |

Estádio da Luz, Lisbon
Attendance: 55,779
Referee: Cüneyt Çakır (Turkey)
1 May 2014
21:05

| Juventus (Italy) | 0–0 | (Portugal) Benfica |
|---|---|---|
| | Report |

Juventus Stadium, Turin
Attendance: 40,775
Referee: Mark Clattenburg (England)

Benfica won 2–1 on aggregate.

== Final ==
The final was played on 14 May 2014 at Juventus Stadium in Turin, Italy. A draw was held on 11 April 2014, after the semi-final draw, to determine the "home" team for administrative purposes.

14 May 2014
20:45

| Sevilla (Spain) | 0–0 (a.e.t.) | (Portugal) Benfica |
|---|---|---|
| | Report |
Penalties
| Bacca (penalty scored); Mbia (penalty scored); Coke (penalty scored); Gameiro (penalty scored) | 4–2 | (penalty scored) Lima; (penalty missed) Cardozo; (penalty missed) Rodrigo; (penalty scored) Luisão |

Juventus Stadium, Turin
Attendance: 33,120
Referee: Felix Brych (Germany)
