= Juan Manuel Vargas =

Peruvian footballer (born 1983)

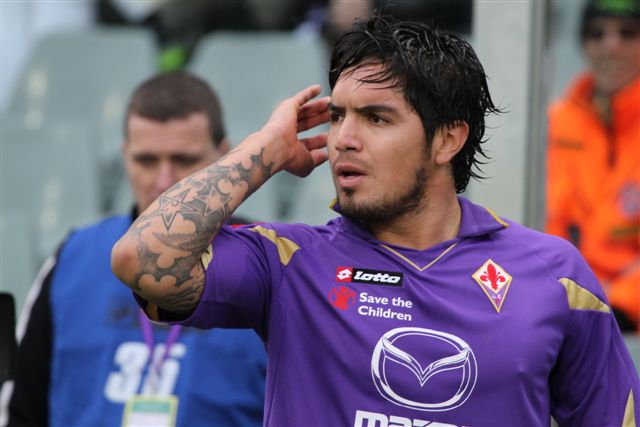
- Vargas playing for Fiorentina in 2011

Personal information
- Full name: Juan Manuel Vargas Risco
- Date of birth: 5 October 1983 (age 43)
- Place of birth: Magdalena del Mar, Peru
- Height: 1.80 m (5 ft 11 in)
- Positions: Left-back; winger

Youth career
- 1995: Universitario
- 1995–1999: Union Minas
- 1999–2001: Universitario

Senior career*
Years	Team	Apps	(Gls)
2002–2004	Universitario	69	(8)
2005–2006	Colón	54	(4)
2006–2008	Catania	69	(5)
2008–2015	Fiorentina	147	(17)
2012–2013	→ Genoa (loan)	20	(0)
2015–2016	Real Betis	20	(3)
2017–2018	Universitario	47	(8)
Total		526	(45)

International career
2004–2016	Peru	62	(4)
Medal record
Men's football
Representing Peru
Copa América
Third place	2011 Argentina
Third place	2015 Chile
- * Club domestic league appearances and goals

Juan Manuel Vargas Risco (Spanish pronunciation: [ˈxwam maˈnwel ˈβaɾɣas]; born 5 October 1983) is a Peruvian former professional footballer who played as a left-back or winger.

Vargas' previous clubs include Universitario, Colón, Catania, Genoa and Fiorentina. He played for Peru at international level. His last team was Universitario de Deportes.

== Club career ==
=== Early career ===
Vargas received his start in the popular Peruvian team Universitario, where he quickly earned a main spot in the team by 2004, given his great play and his crowd-pleasing goals at key moments. In 2005, he transferred to Argentine club Colón.

=== Catania ===
In August 2006, Vargas signed a four-year contract with Catania. He scored his first goal for Catania on 31 October 2007, in the 88th minute, tying Siena 1–1 and prolonging Catania's unbeaten streak to seven matches. During his two-year stay in Sicily, he was continuously one of their best players and was a first-team regular. His performances helped the Sicilians to Serie A survival for two seasons. These impressive displays led to elite clubs around Europe chasing after the 23-year old's signature.

=== Fiorentina ===
On 17 May 2008, it was reported Vargas had agreed to sign for Real Madrid, but on 5 July 2008, he joined Fiorentina for a fee of €12 million. Upon arriving in Florence, he struggled in the left back position and was highly criticized. However, after realizing his true potential as an attacking midfielder, he became a crucial part of the Viola squad providing crucial assists, giving the squad great speed and acting almost as a third forward. On 24 November 2009, Vargas scored a critical spot kick goal that advanced Fiorentina onto the knock-out stages in the UEFA Champions League. This was the first time Fiorentina made it to the round of 16 in ten years.

On the last day of the August 2012 transfer window, Vargas joined Serie A club Genoa on loan for the season, making 20 appearances before rejoining Fiorentina. He scored Fiorentina's goal in their 1–3 defeat to Napoli in the 2014 Coppa Italia Final.

=== Real Betis ===
On 12 August 2015, Vargas signed a two-year deal with Real Betis, newly promoted to La Liga, after his contract with Fiorentina expired. He made his debut for the club on 23 August, starting in a 1–1 home draw against Villarreal.

On 31 August 2016, Vargas terminated his contract.

== Style of play ==
Vargas plays at left back, on the wing, or in the midfield, in both offensive and defensive positions. Vargas impresses with his ability to dribble the ball and make remarkable shots on goal. He is also known for his free-kick ability and accurate crosses. His former Fiorentina teammate Alberto Gilardino stated that Vargas is probably the best crosser he has played with.

== International career ==
Vargas played his first match with the Peru national team against Paraguay in 2006 FIFA World Cup qualifying, with Paulo Autuori as head coach. He scored his first international goal on 12 September 2007 in a friendly match against Bolivia. He was sent off in the 2011 Copa América semi-final match for elbowing a Uruguayan player.

== Personal life ==
Vargas currently lives with his longtime partner Blanca Rodríguez, and their three children: Luana Mia (born in 2007), Ánika Lía (born 28 December 2009), and Juan Manuel (born in 2011).

== Career statistics ==
=== Club ===
Appearances and goals by club, season and competition
Club	Season	League			National cup (Note: Includes Copa Inca, Coppa Italia.)		Continental		Total	
Club	Season	Division	Apps	Goals	Apps	Goals	Apps	Goals	Apps	Goals
Universitario de Deportes	2002	Descentralizado	3	1	—		—		3	1
Universitario de Deportes	2003	Descentralizado	25	1	—		3	0	28	1
Universitario de Deportes	2004	Descentralizado	41	6	—		—		41	6
Universitario de Deportes	Total		69	8	0	0	3	0	72	8
Colón	2004–05	Argentine Primera División	18	3	0	0	—		18	3
Colón	2005–06	Argentine Primera División	36	1	0	0	—		36	1
Colón	Total		54	4	0	0	0	0	54	4
Catania	2006–07	Serie A	33	0	0	0	—		33	0
Catania	2007–08	Serie A	36	5	4	1	—		40	6
Catania	Total		69	5	4	1	0	0	73	6
Fiorentina	2008–09	Serie A	27	3	0	0	7	0	34	3
Fiorentina	2009–10	Serie A	29	5	3	0	10	3	42	8
Fiorentina	2010–11	Serie A	24	4	0	0	—		24	4
Fiorentina	2011–12	Serie A	24	0	2	0	—		26	0
Fiorentina	2013–14	Serie A	24	4	4	2	3	0	31	6
Fiorentina	2014–15	Serie A	19	1	1	0	9	3	29	4
Fiorentina	Total		147	17	10	2	29	6	186	25
Genoa (loan)	2012–13	Serie A	20	0	0	0	—		20	0
Career total			359	34	14	3	32	6	405	43

=== International ===
Appearances and goals by national team and year
National team	Year	Apps	Goals
Peru	2004	2	0
Peru	2005	4	0
Peru	2006	2	0
Peru	2007	6	2
Peru	2008	7	0
Peru	2009	6	1
Peru	2010	3	0
Peru	2011	8	1
Peru	2012	3	0
Peru	2013	7	0
Peru	2014	4	0
Peru	2015	8	0
Peru	2016	1	0
Total		61	4

Scores and results list Peru's goal tally first, score column indicates score after each Vargas goal.

List of international goals scored by Juan Manuel Vargas
No.	Date	Venue	Opponent	Score	Result	Competition
1	12 September 2007	Estadio Monumental "U", Lima, Peru	Bolivia	1–0	2–0	Friendly
2	18 November 2007	Estadio Monumental "U", Lima, Peru	Brazil	1–1	1–1	2010 FIFA World Cup qualification
3	7 June 2009	Estadio Monumental "U", Lima, Peru	Ecuador	1–1	2–1	2010 FIFA World Cup qualification
4	16 July 2011	Estadio Mario Alberto Kempes, Córdoba, Argentina	Colombia	2–0	2–0	2011 Copa América
