= Gonzalo Rodríguez (footballer, born 1984) =

Argentine footballer

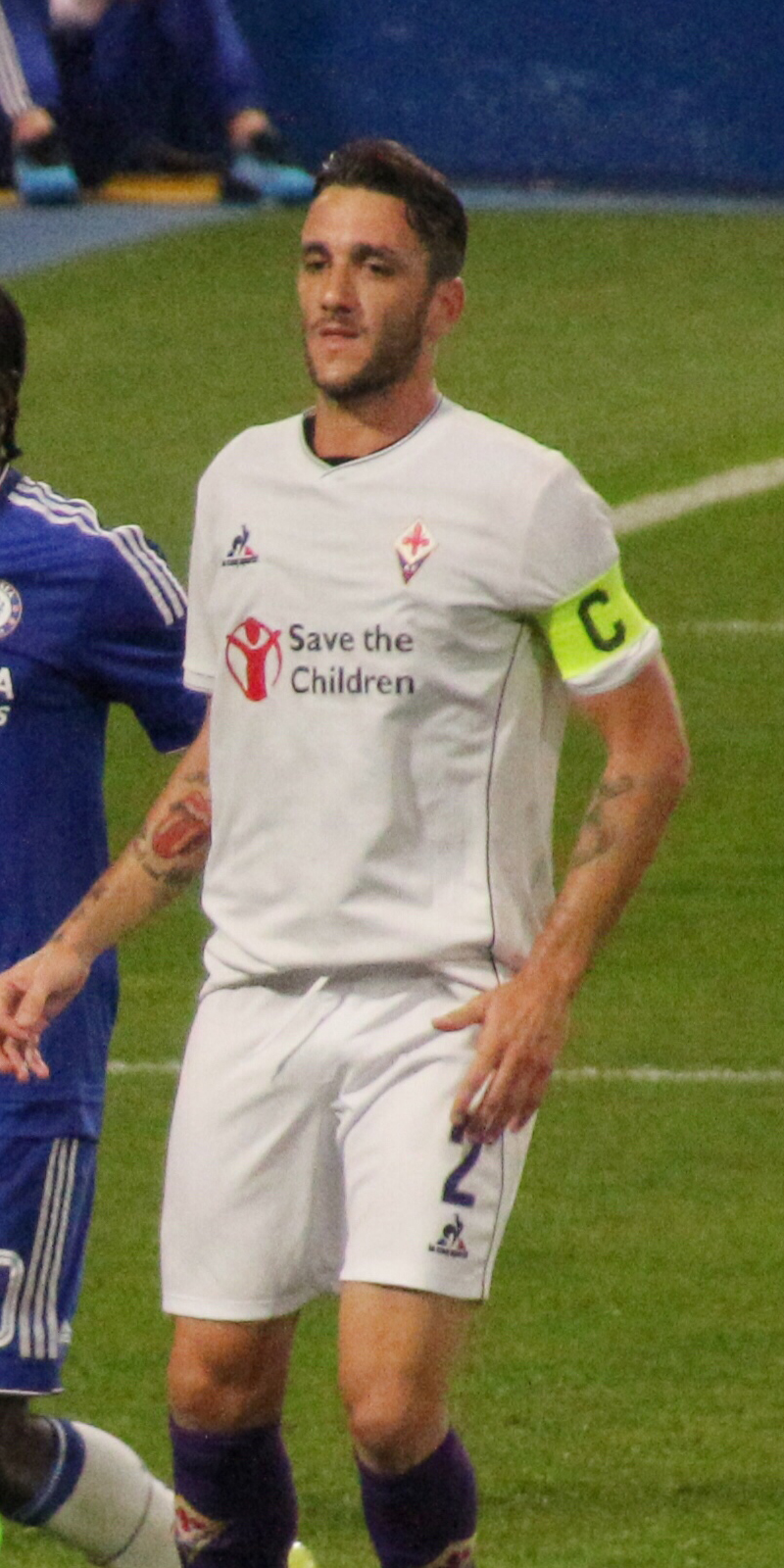
- Rodríguez with Fiorentina in 2015

Personal information
- Full name: Gonzalo Javier Rodríguez Prado
- Date of birth: 10 April 1984 (age 42)
- Place of birth: Buenos Aires, Argentina
- Height: 1.82 m (6 ft 0 in)
- Position: Centre-back

Senior career*
Years	Team	Apps	(Gls)
2002–2004	San Lorenzo	57	(4)
2004–2012	Villarreal	184	(6)
2012–2017	Fiorentina	159	(22)
2017–2020	San Lorenzo	33	(2)
Total		433	(34)

International career
2003–2015	Argentina	7	(1)
- * Club domestic league appearances and goals

Gonzalo Javier Rodríguez Prado (Latin American Spanish: [ɡonˈsalo roˈðɾiɣes]; born 10 April 1984) is an Argentine former professional footballer who played as a central defender.

After starting out at San Lorenzo, he spent most of his career with Villarreal, appearing in 253 competitive matches over the course of eight La Liga seasons (nine goals). He also played five years in the Italian Serie A with Fiorentina.

== Club career ==
=== San Lorenzo ===
Born in Buenos Aires, Gonzalo started playing with San Lorenzo de Almagro. He made his Primera División debut on 26 July 2002 at the age of 18, against Rosario Central.

At age 20, Rodríguez had already represented Argentina, previously having appeared at the 2003 FIFA World Youth Championship with the under-20 team.

=== Villarreal ===
In July 2004, Rodríguez signed for Spain's Villarreal CF, being an undisputed starter in his first two seasons and renewing his contract for a further five years. However, after the surprise elimination from the UEFA Intertoto Cup at the hands of NK Maribor, in which he was sent off, and a month into the league campaign, he suffered a serious injury, tearing the cruciate ligament in his right knee; after returning to activity in April 2007, he suffered the same injury two months later.

Rodríguez returned to good form in 2008–09, often partnering Uruguayan Diego Godín and totalling 48 La Liga games over two seasons, with his side always qualifying for the UEFA Europa League, finishing fifth and seventh respectively. On 7 April 2011, in the Europa League quarter-final tie against FC Twente, he broke his fibula following a tough challenge by Marc Janko, being rushed to hospital in an ambulance and ruled out for the remainder of the season.

=== Fiorentina ===
In early August 2012, following Villarreal's relegation, Gonzalo joined ACF Fiorentina alongside his teammate Borja Valero. He scored six Serie A goals from 35 appearances in his first year, helping to a final fourth place and the subsequent Europa League qualification.

In the 2015–16 season, Rodríguez was named new team captain by new manager Paulo Sousa. He made his 200th competitive appearance for the Italian club on 9 April 2017, and marked the occasion with his 25th goal in a 2–2 away draw against UC Sampdoria.

=== Return to San Lorenzo ===
Rodríguez returned to San Lorenzo in July 2017, on a free transfer. On 23 June 2020, the 36-year-old announced his retirement.

== Career statistics ==
=== Club ===
Club	Season	League		Cup		International		Total	
Club	Season	Apps	Goals	Apps	Goals	Apps	Goals	Apps	Goals
San Lorenzo	2002–03	27	3	0	0	7	1	34	4
San Lorenzo	2003–04	30	1	0	0	5	1	35	2
Total		57	4	0	0	12	2	69	6
Villarreal	2004–05	34	2	0	0	15	2	49	4
Villarreal	2005–06	29	0	1	0	11	0	41	0
Villarreal	2006–07	6	0	0	0	2	0	8	0
Villarreal	2007–08	18	0	0	0	2	0	20	0
Villarreal	2008–09	27	2	0	0	8	0	35	2
Villarreal	2009–10	21	0	2	0	7	0	30	0
Villarreal	2010–11	23	1	6	0	10	1	39	2
Villarreal	2011–12	26	1	0	0	5	0	31	1
Total		184	6	9	0	60	3	253	9
Fiorentina	2012–13	35	6	0	0	0	0	35	6
Fiorentina	2013–14	33	4	3	0	10	2	46	6
Fiorentina	2014–15	30	7	5	0	10	1	45	8
Fiorentina	2015–16	35	4	3	0	5	0	43	4
Fiorentina	2016–17	26	1	1	0	7	0	34	1
Total		159	22	12	0	32	3	203	25
San Lorenzo	2017–18	14	0	2	0	3	0	19	0
San Lorenzo	2018–19	10	1	6	0	4	1	20	2
San Lorenzo	2019–20	9	1	1	0	0	0	10	1
Total		33	2	9	0	7	1	49	3
Career Total		433	34	30	0	111	9	574	43

=== International ===
Argentina
Year	Apps	Goals
2003	2	1
2004	1	0
2005	2	0
2008	1	0
2015	1	0
Total	7	1

Scores and results list Argentina's goal tally first.

Goal	Date	Venue	Opponent	Score	Result	Competition
1.	3 February 2003	Los Angeles Memorial Coliseum, Los Angeles, United States	Mexico	1–0	1–0	Friendly

== Honours ==
San Lorenzo

- Copa Sudamericana: 2002

Villarreal

- UEFA Intertoto Cup: 2004

Individual

- Fiorentina All-time XI
