= Ryder Matos =

Brazilian footballer

Personal information
- Full name: Ryder Matos Santos Pinto
- Date of birth: 27 February 1993 (age 33)
- Place of birth: Seabra, Brazil
- Height: 1.83 m (6 ft 0 in)
- Positions: Winger; forward

Team information
- Current team: Hibernians

Youth career
- 2005–2009: Vitória
- 2009–2013: Fiorentina

Senior career*
| Years | Team | Apps | (Gls) |
| 2013–2016 | Fiorentina | 23 | (0) |
| 2012–2013 | → Bahia (loan) | 9 | (1) |
| 2014 | → Córdoba (loan) | 3 | (0) |
| 2015 | → Palmeiras (loan) | 1 | (0) |
| 2015–2016 | → Carpi (loan) | 15 | (2) |
| 2016–2021 | Udinese | 36 | (0) |
| 2018–2019 | → Verona (loan) | 44 | (3) |
| 2019–2020 | → Luzern (loan) | 23 | (1) |
| 2020–2021 | → Empoli (loan) | 28 | (7) |
| 2021–2026 | Perugia | 120 | (9) |
| 2026 | Trapani | 14 | (0) |
| 2026– | Hibernians | 0 | (0) |

International career
| 2014 | Brazil U20 | 2 | (1) |
- * Club domestic league appearances and goals as of 1 May 2026

Ryder Matos Santos Pinto (born 27 February 1993) is a Brazilian professional footballer who plays as a winger or forward for Maltese club Hibernians.

== Club career ==
=== Fiorentina ===
Born in Seabra, Bahia, Matos was scouted by Fiorentina's sport director Pantaleo Corvino aged 15, while playing for Vitória. He moved to La Viola in 2008, and was promoted to the Primavera squad in 2010.

==== 2012–2013: Loan to Bahia ====
On 29 June 2012, Matos moved back to Brazil, joining Vitória's fierce rivals Bahia on loan. Despite being initially assigned to the youth team, he made his debut as a professional on 8 August, coming on as a second-half substitute in a 0–0 home draw against Portuguesa for the Campeonato Brasileiro Série A championship.

Matos was definitely promoted to Bahia's main squad in 2013, and appeared sparingly during the Campeonato Baiano championship, in which his side finished second. He scored his first professional goal on 2 June, netting the first of a 2–1 win against Internacional.

==== 2013–2014: Return to Fiorentina ====
Matos returned to Fiorentina in late June 2013, and made his debut for the club on 19 September, in their first match of the group stage of 2013–14 UEFA Europa League against Paços de Ferreira, coming on as a substitute for Joaquín in the 66th minute, and scoring the second of a 3–0 home win. He scored two further goals in the same competition, both against Pandurii Târgu Jiu.

==== 2014: Loan to Córdoba ====
On 21 July 2014, Matos moved teams and countries again, joining newly promoted side Córdoba CF in a season-long loan. He made his La Liga debut on 25 August 2014, starting in a 0–2 away loss against Real Madrid.

==== 2015: Loan to Palmeiras ====
On 19 January 2015, after being deemed surplus to requirements by new manager Miroslav Đukić, he moved to Palmeiras on loan until December.

==== 2015–2016: Loan to Carpi ====
On 8 July 2015, Matos joined Serie A club Carpi on loan until the end of the season.

=== Udinese ===
On 30 January 2016, Matos transferred to Udinese, signing a four-year contract.

==== 2018–2019: Loan to Hellas Verona ====
On 10 January 2018, Matos transferred on loan to Hellas Verona from Udinese until 30 June 2018.

==== 2019–2020: Loan to Luzern ====
On 29 August 2019, Matos transferred on loan to FC Luzern from Udinese until 2020.

==== 2020–2021: Loan to Empoli ====
After making one appearance for Udinese early in the 2020–21 Serie A season, on 4 October 2020 he moved on loan to Serie B club Empoli for the season 2020/21 scoring 7 goals and winning promotion to Serie A with the Tuscan team.

=== Perugia ===
After returning to Udine at the end of the loan, Serie B club AC Perugia signed him on a two-year contract on 31 August 2021.

== Career statistics ==
=== Club ===
As of 12 June 2019

| Club | League | Season | League | | Cup | | Europe | | Other | | Total | |
| Club | League | Season | Apps | Goals | Apps | Goals | Apps | Goals | Apps | Goals | Apps | Goals |
|---|---|---|---|---|---|---|---|---|---|---|---|---|
| Bahia (loan) | Série A | 2012 | 1 | 0 | 0 | 0 | – | | – | | 1 | 0 |
| Bahia (loan) | Série A | 2013 | 5 | 1 | 0 | 0 | – | | – | | 5 | 1 |
| Bahia (loan) | Total | | 6 | 1 | 0 | 0 | – | | – | | 6 | 1 |
| Fiorentina | Serie A | 2013–14 | 23 | 0 | 5 | 0 | 8 | 3 | – | | 36 | 3 |
| Córdoba (loan) | La Liga | 2014–15 | 3 | 0 | 1 | 0 | – | | – | | 4 | 0 |
| Palmeiras (loan) | Série A | 2015 | 0 | 0 | 0 | 0 | – | | – | | 0 | 0 |
| Carpi (loan) | Serie A | 2015–16 | 15 | 2 | 3 | 3 | – | | – | | 18 | 5 |
| Udinese | Serie A | 2015–16 | 11 | 0 | 0 | 0 | – | | – | | 11 | 0 |
| Udinese | Serie A | 2016–17 | 20 | 0 | 1 | 0 | – | | – | | 21 | 0 |
| Udinese | Serie A | 2017–18 | 4 | 0 | 1 | 0 | – | | – | | 5 | 0 |
| Udinese | Total | | 35 | 2 | 2 | 0 | – | | – | | 37 | 0 |
| Verona (loan) | Serie A | 2017–18 | 14 | 0 | 0 | 0 | – | | – | | 14 | 0 |
| Verona (loan) | Serie B | 2018–19 | 24 | 3 | 2 | 1 | – | | 5 | 0 | 31 | 4 |
| Verona (loan) | Total | | 38 | 3 | 2 | 1 | 0 | 0 | 5 | 0 | 45 | 4 |
| Career total | | | 120 | 6 | 13 | 4 | 8 | 3 | 5 | 0 | 146 | 13 |
