= Mikkel Vestergaard =

Danish footballer (born 1992)

Personal information
- Full name: Mikkel Mose Vestergaard
- Date of birth: 22 November 1992 (age 33)
- Height: 1.80 m (5 ft 11 in)
- Position: Forward

Youth career
- Esbjerg fB

Senior career*
Years	Team	Apps	(Gls)
2011–2016	Esbjerg fB	38	(6)
2016–2019	Viborg FF	19	(3)

International career
2009	Denmark U18	2	(0)
2014	Denmark U21	1	(0)
- * Club domestic league appearances and goals as of 11:09, 24 June 2019 (UTC)

Mikkel Vestergaard (born 22 November 1992) is a Danish retired football forward.

== Club career ==
Having played for Esbjerg since the age of 3, at the age of 16 he signed a youth contract with Esbjerg. By the age of 18 he signed his first professional contract with the club, keeping him at Esbjerg until 31 December 2014.

On 15 May 2011 he got his first team debut in a scoreless draw against AaB at Blue Water Arena, becoming the 6th youngest EfB debutant ever.

On 20 January 2016, Vestergaard signed a pre-contract with Viborg FF, applicable from the summer 2016.

Esbjerg and Viborg, however, negotiated a transition already on 25 January 2016, and the clubs reached an agreement so he could transfer with immediate effect instead of in the summer. He left Viborg at the end of the 2018/19 season.

On 30 August 2019, 26-year old Vestergaard announced that he would retire due to injuries.

== International career ==
He has represented the Denmark U-18 team on 2 occasions.

In 2011, he was called up for the Denmark U-21 team, but didn't get any minutes on the pitch.
