= Luca Lezzerini =

Italian footballer

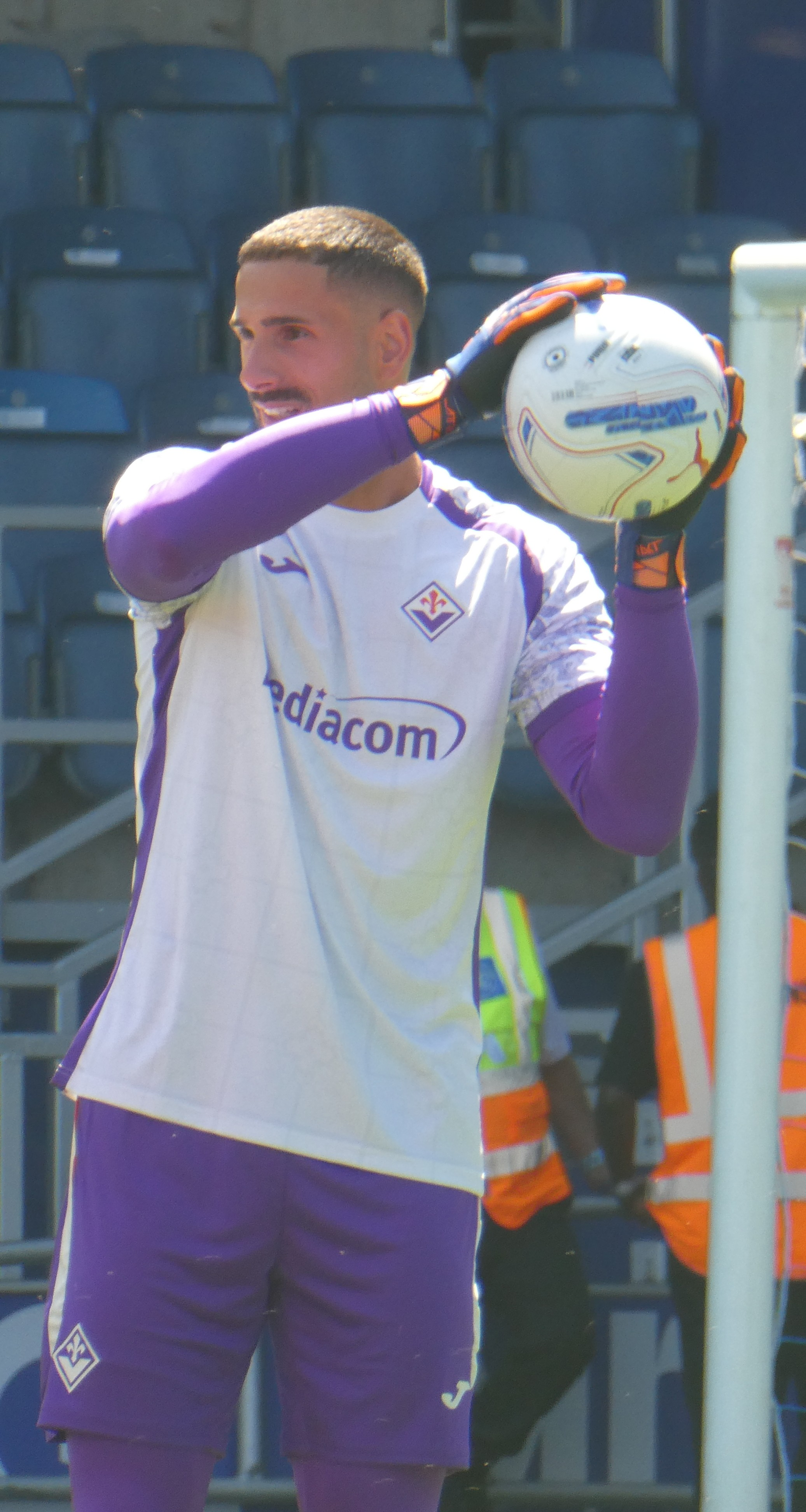
- Lezzerini warming up for Fiorentina in 2026

Personal information
- Date of birth: 24 March 1995 (age 31)
- Place of birth: Rome, Italy
- Height: 1.95 m (6 ft 5 in)
- Position: Goalkeeper

Team information
- Current team: Fiorentina
- Number: 19

Youth career
- –2015: Fiorentina

Senior career*
Years	Team	Apps	(Gls)
2015–2017	Fiorentina	3	(0)
2017	→ Avellino (loan)	1	(0)
2017–2018	Avellino	21	(0)
2018–2022	Venezia	65	(0)
2022–2025	Brescia	78	(0)
2025–	Fiorentina	1	(0)

International career
2010	Italy U16	3	(0)
2010–2012	Italy U17	16	(0)
2012–2013	Italy U19	4	(0)
- * Club domestic league appearances and goals as of 09:00, 23 May 2026 (UTC)

Luca Lezzerini (born 24 March 1995) is an Italian professional footballer who plays as a goalkeeper for Serie A club Fiorentina.

== Club career ==
Lezzerini is a youth exponent from Fiorentina. He made his Serie A debut on 1 November 2015 against Frosinone. He replaced fellow goalkeeper Ciprian Tătărușanu after 71 minutes in a 4–1 home win.

After a loan, Avellino signed Lezzerini outright on 10 July 2017.

On 30 June 2022, Lezzerini moved to Brescia, as a part of the move of Jesse Joronen from Brescia to Venezia.

On 1 August 2025, Lezzerini returned to Fiorentina on a one-season contract, with club option to extend for two more seasons.

== Career statistics ==
As of match played 22 May 2026

Appearances and goals by club, season and competition
Club	Season	League			Coppa Italia		Europe		Other		Total	
Club	Season	Division	Apps	Goals	Apps	Goals	Apps	Goals	Apps	Goals	Apps	Goals
Fiorentina	2013–14	Serie A	0	0	0	0	0	0	—		0	0
Fiorentina	2014–15	Serie A	0	0	0	0	0	0	—		0	0
Fiorentina	2015–16	Serie A	2	0	0	0	0	0	—		2	0
Fiorentina	2016–17	Serie A	1	0	0	0	1 (Note: Appearance in UEFA Europa League)	0	—		2	0
Fiorentina	Total		3	0	0	0	1	0	—		4	0
Avellino (loan)	2016–17	Serie B	1	0	—		—		—		1	0
Avellino	2017–18	Serie B	20	0	0	0	—		—		20	0
Avellino	Total		21	0	0	0	—		—		21	0
Venezia	2018–19	Serie B	4	0	1	0	—		0	0	5	0
Venezia	2019–20	Serie B	34	0	2	0	—		—		36	0
Venezia	2020–21	Serie B	21	0	0	0	—		0	0	21	0
Venezia	2021–22	Serie A	6	0	2	0	—		—		8	0
Venezia	Total		65	0	5	0	—		0	0	70	0
Brescia	2022–23	Serie B	16	0	0	0	—		0	0	16	0
Brescia	2023–24	Serie B	25	0	0	0	—		1 (Note: Appearance in Serie B promotion play-offs)	0	26	0
Brescia	2024–25	Serie B	37	0	1	0	—		—		38	0
Brescia	Total		78	0	1	0	—		1	0	80	0
Fiorentina	2025–26	Serie A	1	0	0	0	2 (Note: Appearances in UEFA Conference League)	0	—		3	0
Fiorentina	2026–27	Serie A	0	0	0	0	—		—		0	0
Fiorentina	Total		1	0	0	0	2	0	—		3	0
Career total			168	0	6	0	3	0	1	0	178	0
