= Khouma Babacar =

Senegalese footballer

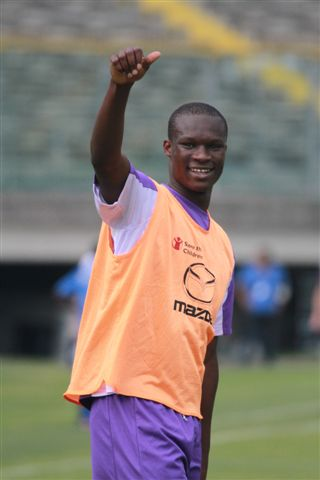
- Babacar with Fiorentina

Personal information
- Full name: Elhadji Babacar Khouma
- Date of birth: 17 March 1993 (age 33)
- Place of birth: Thiès, Senegal
- Height: 1.85 m (6 ft 1 in)
- Position: Striker

Team information
- Current team: Sarıyer
- Number: 15

Youth career
- 2005–2007: Rail
- 2007–2008: Pescara
- 2008–2009: Fiorentina

Senior career*
Years	Team	Apps	(Gls)
2009–2018	Fiorentina	99	(27)
2012	→ Racing Santander (loan)	8	(0)
2012–2013	→ Padova (loan)	16	(1)
2013–2014	→ Modena (loan)	41	(20)
2018	→ Sassuolo (loan)	13	(2)
2018–2022	Sassuolo	29	(7)
2019–2020	→ Lecce (loan)	25	(3)
2020–2022	→ Alanyaspor (loan)	41	(11)
2022–2024	Copenhagen	17	(3)
2024–2025	Boluspor	24	(8)
2025–	Sarıyer	7	(2)

International career^{‡}
2009–2010	Senegal U17	3	(1)
2010–2012	Senegal U20	6	(1)
2017–	Senegal	2	(0)
- * Club domestic league appearances and goals as of 1 November 2025 ‡ National team caps and goals as of 9 June 2017

Elhadji Babacar Khouma (born 17 March 1993), known as Khouma Babacar, is a Senegalese professional footballer who plays as a striker for Turkish TFF 1. Lig club Sarıyer.

== Club career ==
Born in Thiès, Babacar began his career in the academy of US Rail in his hometown. Two years later, aged only 14, he moved to Italy and signed with Delfino Pescara 1936 after a successful trial.

In July 2008, Babacar signed with another club in the latter country, ACF Fiorentina, after also being tracked by another Serie A side, Genoa CFC. In the 2009–10 season he began training with the first team, coached by Cesare Prandelli.

On 14 January 2010, at the age of 16 years and 10 months, Babacar made his official debut for the Viola, starting against A.C. ChievoVerona in the Coppa Italia and scoring the 2–2 equaliser in the 75th minute of an eventual 3–2 home win. He scored his first league goal on 20 March, netting the third in a 3–0 home victory over Genoa.

On 31 January 2012, Babacar was loaned to Spain's Racing de Santander. He maiden appearance in La Liga took place 11 days later, when he came on as late substitute in a 0–0 home draw against Atlético Madrid.

Babacar netted ten times in 22 matches in the 2016–17 campaign, helping his team finish in eighth place. In January 2018, he joined U.S. Sassuolo Calcio on loan until 30 June as part of a swap deal involving Diego Falcinelli – his new club also secured an option to sign him permanently.

On 2 September 2019, Babacar was loaned to newly promoted U.S. Lecce on a season-long move.

On 21 January 2022, he signed a contract with Danish club Copenhagen until the summer of 2025. In August 2024, he had his contract terminated by mutual consent having not featured for the club in almost two years.

== International career ==
Babacar made his debut for Senegal on 27 March 2017, playing the second half of a 1–1 friendly draw with Ivory Coast that had to be abandoned in the 88th minute due to a pitch invasion.

== Career statistics ==
=== Club ===
As of match played 17 July 2022

Appearances and goals by club, season and competition
Club	Season	League			Cup		Europe		Total	
Club	Season	Division	Apps	Goals	Apps	Goals	Apps	Goals	Apps	Goals
Fiorentina	2009–10	Serie A	4	1	1	1	—		5	2
Fiorentina	2010–11	Serie A	18	0	3	2	—		21	2
Fiorentina	2011–12	Serie A	1	0	0	0	—		1	0
Fiorentina	2014–15	Serie A	20	7	3	0	5 (Note: Appearance(s) in UEFA Europa League)	2	28	9
Fiorentina	2015–16	Serie A	18	5	1	0	5	2	24	7
Fiorentina	2016–17	Serie A	22	10	1	0	8	4	31	14
Fiorentina	2017–18	Serie A	16	4	2	1	—		18	5
Fiorentina	Total		99	27	11	4	18	8	128	39
Racing Santander (loan)	2011–12	La Liga	8	0	0	0	—		8	0
Padova (loan)	2012–13	Serie B	16	1	1	1	—		17	2
Modena (loan)	2013–14	Serie B	41	20	1	0	—		42	20
Sassuolo	2017–18	Serie A	13	2	0	0	—		13	2
Sassuolo	2018–19	Serie A	29	7	2	0	—		31	7
Sassuolo	Total		42	9	2	0	—		44	9
Lecce (loan)	2019–20	Serie A	25	3	0	0	—		25	3
Alanyaspor (loan)	2020–21	Süper Lig	25	8	2	4	1	0	28	12
Alanyaspor (loan)	2021–22	Süper Lig	16	3	1	3	—		17	6
Alanyaspor (loan)	Total		41	11	3	7	1	0	45	18
Copenhagen	2021–22	Danish Superliga	14	3	0	0	0	0	14	3
Copenhagen	2022–23	Danish Superliga	3	0	0	0	0	0	3	0
Copenhagen	Total		17	3	0	0	0	0	17	3
Career total			289	74	18	12	19	8	326	94

== Honours ==
Copenhagen

- Danish Superliga: 2021–22
