= 2016–17 ACF Fiorentina season =

Fiorentina
2016–17 season
- President: Mario Cognigni
- Manager: Paulo Sousa
- Stadium: Stadio Artemio Franchi
- Serie A: 8th
- Coppa Italia: Quarter-finals
- UEFA Europa League: Round of 32
- Top goalscorer: League: Nikola Kalinić (15); All: Nikola Kalinić (20)
- Highest home attendance: 34,085 vs Juventus (15 January 2017, Serie A)
- Lowest home attendance: 6,477 vs Chievo (11 January 2017, Coppa Italia)
- Average home league attendance: 26,470
Home colours	Away colours	Third colours

The 2016–17 season was the 90th season in ACF Fiorentina's history and their 79th in the top-flight of Italian football. Fiorentina competed in Serie A, the Coppa Italia, and the UEFA Europa League.

The club continued its league regression under Paulo Sousa, finishing eighth after an average league campaign, while also being eliminated in the Coppa Italia in the quarter-finals. However perhaps the poorest result of the season was Fiorentina's elimination from the UEFA Europa League in the round of 32 by German club Borussia Mönchengladbach; after winning the first leg 1–0 in Germany and taking a 2–0 lead at home in the second leg, the team managed to concede four straight goals, losing 4–3 on aggregate.

The season was Sousa's second and last in charge of the team, as his contract was not renewed for the 2017–18 season.

== Players ==
=== Squad information ===
Last updated on 28 May 2017
Appearances include league matches only

No.	Name	Nat	Position(s)	Date of birth (Age at end of season)	Signed from	Signed in	Contract ends	Apps.	Goals
Goalkeepers
12	Ciprian Tătărușanu	(Romania)	GK	9 February 1986 (aged 31)	(Romania) Steaua București	2014	2019	81	0
23	Giacomo Satalino	(Italy)	GK	20 May 1999 (aged 18)	(Italy) Youth Sector	2017	2019	0	0
57	Marco Sportiello	(Italy)	GK	10 May 1992 (aged 25)	(Italy) Atalanta	2017	2018	2	0
97	Bartłomiej Drągowski	(Poland)	GK	19 August 1997 (aged 19)	(Poland) Jagiellonia Białystok	2016	2021	1	0
Defenders
2	Gonzalo Rodríguez (Captain)	(Argentina)	CB	10 April 1984 (aged 33)	(Spain) Villarreal	2012	2017	159	22
4	Sebastian De Maio	(France)	CB	5 March 1987 (aged 30)	(Belgium) Anderlecht	2016	2017	6	0
13	Davide Astori	(Italy)	CB	7 January 1987 (aged 30)	(Italy) Cagliari	2015	2019	66	2
15	Maximiliano Olivera	(Uruguay)	CB / RB	5 March 1992 (aged 25)	(Croatia) Rijeka	2016	2017	18	0
18	Carlos Salcedo	(Mexico)	CB	29 September 1993 (aged 23)	(Mexico) Guadalajara	2016	2017	18	0
31	Hrvoje Milić	(Croatia)	LB	10 May 1989 (aged 28)	(Croatia) Hajduk Split	2016	2018	17	0
40	Nenad Tomović	(Serbia)	CB / RB	30 August 1987 (aged 29)	(Italy) Genoa	2012	2020	124	1
Midfielders
5	Milan Badelj	(Croatia)	DM / CM	25 February 1989 (aged 28)	(Germany) Hamburg	2014	2018	81	4
6	Carlos Sánchez	(Colombia)	DM / CM	6 February 1986 (aged 31)	(England) Aston Villa	2016	2018	29	1
8	Matías Vecino	(Uruguay)	CM / AM	24 August 1991 (aged 25)	(Uruguay) Nacional	2013	2021	67	5
11	Hernán Toledo	(Argentina)	AM	17 January 1996 (aged 21)	(Uruguay) Deportivo Maldonado	2016	2017	0	0
19	Sebastián Cristóforo	(Uruguay)	CM	23 August 1993 (aged 23)	(Spain) Sevilla	2016	2017	19	0
20	Borja Valero (Vice-Captain)	(Spain)	DM / CM / AM	12 January 1985 (aged 32)	(Spain) Villarreal	2012	2019	166	14
21	Riccardo Saponara	(Italy)	AM	21 December 1991 (aged 25)	(Italy) Empoli	2017	2018	11	2
24	Ianis Hagi	(Romania)	AM / RW	28 October 1998 (aged 18)	(Romania) Viitorul Constanța	2016	2019	2	0
72	Josip Iličić	(Slovenia)	AM / RW / SS	29 January 1988 (aged 29)	(Italy) Palermo	2013	2018	106	29
Forwards
9	Nikola Kalinić	(Croatia)	CF / ST	5 January 1988 (aged 29)	(Ukraine) Dnipro Dnipropetrovsk	2015	2019	69	27
10	Federico Bernardeschi	(Italy)	RW / LW / SS	16 February 1994 (aged 23)	(Italy) Youth Sector	2011	2019	72	14
16	Cristian Tello	(Spain)	W	11 August 1991 (aged 25)	(Spain) Barcelona	2016	2017	51	6
25	Federico Chiesa	(Italy)	AM / RW	25 October 1997 (aged 19)	(Italy) Youth Sector	2016	2021	27	3
26	Joshua Pérez	(United States)	RW	21 January 1998 (aged 19)	(Italy) Youth Sector	2016	2019	1	0
30	Khouma Babacar	(Senegal)	CF / ST	17 March 1993 (aged 24)	(Italy) Youth Sector	2009	2019	83	23
32	Jan Mlakar	(Slovenia)	CF / ST	23 October 1998 (aged 18)	(Italy) Youth Sector	2017		1	0
Players transferred during the season
1	Luca Lezzerini	(Italy)	GK	24 March 1995 (age 31)	(Italy) Youth Sector	2011	2018	3	0
7	Mauro Zárate	(Argentina)	SS / AM	18 March 1987 (age 39)	(England) West Ham United	2016	2018	22	5
14	Matías Fernández	(Chile)	CM / AM / RM	15 May 1986 (age 40)	(Portugal) Sporting CP	2012	2018	96	7
17	Kevin Diks	(Netherlands)	RB	6 October 1996 (age 29)	(Netherlands) Vitesse	2016	2021	2	0
28	Marcos Alonso	(Spain)	LB / LM	28 December 1990 (age 35)	(England) Bolton Wanderers	2013	2021	58	4

== Transfers ==
=== In ===
Date	Pos.	Player	Age	Moving from	Fee	Notes	Source
1 July 2016	DF	(Italy) Davide Astori	29	(Italy) Cagliari	€3.5M	Option to buy exercised	
1 July 2016	FW	(Uruguay) Jaime Báez	21	(Italy) Livorno	Loan return		
1 July 2016	MF	(Australia) Joshua Brillante	23	(Italy) Como	Loan return		
1 July 2016	DF	(Brazil) Gilberto	23	(Italy) Hellas Verona	Loan return		
1 July 2016	FW	(Germany) Mario Gómez	30	(Turkey) Beşiktaş	Loan return		
1 July 2016	FW	(Croatia) Ante Rebić	22	(Italy) Hellas Verona	Loan return		
1 July 2016	FW	(Italy) Giuseppe Rossi	29	(Spain) Levante	Loan return		
1 July 2016	DF	(Ghana) Amidu Salifu	23	(Italy) Brescia	Loan return		
1 July 2016	MF	(Uruguay) Andrés Schetino	22	(Italy) Livorno	Loan return		
4 July 2016	GK	(Poland) Bartłomiej Drągowski	18	(Poland) Jagiellonia Białystok	€3.2M		
6 July 2016	DF	(Netherlands) Kevin Diks	19	(Netherlands) Vitesse	€2.5M		
10 July 2016	MF	(Romania) Ianis Hagi	17	(Romania) Viitorul Constanța	€2M		
17 August 2016	DF	(Croatia) Hrvoje Milić	27	(Croatia) Hajduk Split	€1M		
18 August 2016	FW	(Croatia) Josip Maganjić	17	(Croatia) Hajduk Split	€0.7M		

==== Loans in ====
Date	Pos.	Player	Age	Moving from	Fee	Notes	Source
25 July 2016	MF	(Argentina) Hernán Toledo	20	(Argentina) Vélez Sarsfield	€0.5M	Loan with an option to buy for €7M	
9 August 2016	MF	(Colombia) Carlos Sánchez	30	(England) Aston Villa	€0.3M	Loan with a mandatory option to buy if Sánchez appears in 50% of Fiorentina's matches	
16 August 2016	FW	(Spain) Cristian Tello	25	(Spain) Barcelona	€0.5M	Loan with an option to buy for €7.5M	
18 August 2016	DF	(France) Sebastien De Maio	29	(Belgium) Anderlecht	Loan		
22 August 2016	DF	(Mexico) Carlos Salcedo	22	(Mexico) Guadalajara	Loan	Loan with an option to buy for €7M	
27 August 2016	MF	(Uruguay) Sebastián Cristóforo	23	(Spain) Sevilla	Loan		
27 August 2016	DF	(Poland) Adam Chrzanowski	17	(Poland) Lechia Gdańsk	Loan		
13 January 2017	GK	(Italy) Marco Sportiello	24	(Italy) Atalanta	Loan	Loan with an option to buy	
28 January 2017	MF	(Italy) Riccardo Saponara	25	(Italy) Empoli	Loan	18-month loan with an option to buy for €10M	

=== Out ===
Date	Pos.	Player	Age	Moving to	Fee	Notes	Source
1 July 2016	DF	(Italy) Manuel Pasqual	34	(Italy) Empoli	Free		
2 July 2016	DF	(Argentina) José María Basanta	32	(Mexico) Monterrey	€1M		
4 July 2016	MF	(Poland) Rafał Wolski	23	(Poland) Lechia Gdańsk	€0.5M		
12 July 2016	FW	(Italy) Filippo Bandinelli	21	(Italy) Latina	Undisclosed		
12 July 2016	MF	(Australia) Joshua Brillante	23	(Australia) Sydney	Undisclosed		
12 July 2016	DF	(Argentina) Facundo Roncaglia	29	(Spain) Celta Vigo	Free		
17 August 2016	FW	(Germany) Mario Gómez	31	(Germany) Wolfsburg	€7M		
31 August 2016	DF	(Spain) Marcos Alonso	25	(England) Chelsea	€27M		
25 January 2017	FW	(Argentina) Mauro Zárate	29	(England) Watford	€2.75M		

==== Loans out ====
Date	Pos.	Player	Age	Moving to	Fee	Notes	Source
5 July 2016	FW	(Croatia) Ante Rebić	22	(Germany) Eintracht Frankfurt	Undisclosed	On loan until the end of the season	
27 August 2016	FW	(Italy) Giuseppe Rossi	29	(Spain) Celta Vigo	Loan	Loan with an option to buy	
29 August 2016	FW	(Uruguay) Jaime Báez	21	(Italy) Spezia	Loan		
31 August 2016	MF	(Chile) Matías Fernández	30	(Italy) Milan	€0.5M	Loan with an option to buy for €1M	
18 January 2017	GK	(Italy) Luca Lezzerini	21	(Italy) Avellino	Loan		
30 January 2017	DF	(Netherlands) Kevin Diks	20	(Netherlands) Vitesse	Loan		

== Pre-season and friendlies ==
14 July 2016 Friendly	Fiorentina	10–1	Trentino Team
--:-- CEST (UTC+02:00)	Rossi 9', 44'; Báez 20', 21'; Diakhate 26'; Gilberto 33'; Zárate 59', 63'; Chiesa 66'; Iličić 83'	Report	Gorla 28'	Attendance: 400

29 July 2016 Friendly	Cesena	2–0	Fiorentina	Cesena, Italy
--:-- CEST (UTC+02:00)	Ragusa 9'; Đurić 51'	Report		Stadium: Stadio Dino Manuzzi; Attendance: 2,300

31 July 2016 Friendly	Fiorentina	0–1	(Spain) Celta Vigo	Florence, Italy
--:-- CEST (UTC+02:00)		Report	Bongonda 23'	Stadium: Stadio Artemio Franchi

4 August 2016 Friendly	Fiorentina	1–3	(Germany) Bayer Leverkusen	Zell am See, Germany
--:-- CEST (UTC+02:00)	Kalinić 73'	Report	Öztunalı 8'; Mehmedi 61'; Kampl 78'	Stadium: Alois Latini Stadion

7 August 2016 Friendly	Fiorentina	1–3	(Germany) Schalke 04	Zell am See, Germany
17:00 CEST (UTC+02:00)	Kalinić 29'	Report	Choupo-Moting 5', 84'; Naldo 70'	Stadium: Alois Latini Stadion; Attendance: 2,000; Referee: Michael Achleitner

13 August 2016 Trofeo Naranja	Valencia (Spain)	2–1	Fiorentina	Valencia, Spain
20:30 CEST (UTC+02:00)	Rodrigo 20'; Rafa Mir 87'	Report	Bernardeschi 7'	Stadium: Mestalla

== Competitions ==
=== Overall ===
Competition	Started round	Current position	Final position	First match	Last match
Serie A	Matchday 1	—	8th	20 August 2016	28 May 2017
Coppa Italia	Round of 16	—	Quarter-finals	11 January 2017	24 January 2017
Europa League	Group stage	—	Round of 32	15 September 2016	23 February 2017

Last updated: 28 May 2017

=== Serie A ===
==== League table ====
Pos	Team	Pld	W	D	L	GF	GA	GD	Pts	Qualification or relegation
6	Milan	38	18	9	11	57	45	+12	63	Qualification for the Europa League third qualifying round
7	Internazionale	38	19	5	14	72	49	+23	62	
8	Fiorentina	38	16	12	10	63	57	+6	60	
9	Torino	38	13	14	11	71	66	+5	53	
10	Sampdoria	38	12	12	14	49	55	−6	48	

Source: Serie A, Soccerway
Rules for classification: 1) Points; 2) Head-to-head points; 3) Head-to-head goal difference; 4) Goal difference; 5) Goals scored; 6) Draw.

==== Results summary ====
Overall								Home						Away					
Pld	W	D	L	GF	GA	GD	Pts	W	D	L	GF	GA	GD	W	D	L	GF	GA	GD
38	16	12	10	63	57	+6	60	10	8	1	34	23	+11	6	4	9	29	34	−5

Last updated: 28 May 2017.
Source: Competitive matches

==== Results by round ====
Round	1	2	3	4	5	6	7	8	9	10	11	12	13	14	15	16	17	18	19	20	21	22	23	24	25	26	27	28	29	30	31	32	33	34	35	36	37	38
Ground	A	H	A	H	A	H	A	H	A	H	A	H	A	A	H	H	A	H	A	H	A	H	A	H	A	H	A	H	A	H	A	H	H	A	A	H	A	H
Result	L	W	L	W	D	D	L	D	W	D	W	D	W	L	W	W	L	D	W	W	W	D	L	W	L	D	D	W	W	W	D	L	W	L	D	W	L	D
Position	14	10	13	8	9	12	14	14	11	11	8	8	8	9	8	7	8	9	9	9	8	7	8	8	8	8	8	8	8	8	8	8	8	8	8	7	8	8

Updated to match(es) played on 28 May 2017. Source: Competitive matches
A = Away; H = Home; W = Win; D = Draw; L = Loss

==== Matches ====
20 August 2016 1	Juventus	2–1	Fiorentina	Turin
20:45 CEST (UTC+02:00)	Khedira 37'; Barzagli (yellow card) 54'; Higuaín 75'	Report	Kalinić (yellow card) 39', (goal) 70'; Vecino (yellow card) 44'; Tomović (yellow card) 90+1'	Stadium: Juventus Stadium; Attendance: 40,184; Referee: Davide Massa

28 August 2016 2	Fiorentina	1–0	Chievo	Florence
20:45 CEST (UTC+02:00)	Sánchez 29'	Report	Cesar (yellow card) 12'; Hetemaj (yellow card) 64'	Stadium: Stadio Artemio Franchi; Attendance: 32,304; Referee: Michael Fabbri

18 September 2016 4	Fiorentina	1–0	Roma	Florence
20:45 CEST (UTC+02:00)	Sánchez (yellow card) 31'; Badelj 82'	Report	Florenzi (yellow card) 63'	Stadium: Stadio Artemio Franchi; Attendance: 27,359; Referee: Nicola Rizzoli

21 September 2016 5	Udinese	2–2	Fiorentina	Udine
20:45 CEST (UTC+02:00)	Zapata 26'; Heurtaux (yellow card) 38'; Danilo 45'	Report	Babacar 30'; Bernardeschi 52' (pen.); Milić (yellow card) 53'; Tomović (yellow card) 64'; De Maio (yellow card) 83'	Stadium: Stadio Friuli; Attendance: 15,164; Referee: Paolo Mazzoleni

25 September 2016 6	Fiorentina	0–0	Milan	Florence
20:45 CEST (UTC+02:00)	Gonzalo (yellow card) 3'; Milić (yellow card) 90+1'	Report	Calabria (yellow card) 23'; Montolivo (yellow card) 45'; Locatelli (yellow card) 80'; Antonelli (yellow card) 90+6'	Stadium: Stadio Artemio Franchi; Attendance: 29,786; Referee: Daniele Orsato

2 October 2016 7	Torino	2–1	Fiorentina	Turin
18:00 CEST (UTC+02:00)	Falque 15'; Castán (yellow card) 36'; Benassi 60'	Report	Sánchez (yellow card) 55'; Salcedo (yellow card) 80'; Babacar 84'	Stadium: Stadio Olimpico Grande Torino; Attendance: 21,641; Referee: Gianpaolo Calvarese

16 October 2016 8	Fiorentina	0–0	Atalanta	Florence
12:30 CEST (UTC+02:00)	Badelj (yellow card) 14'; Astori (yellow card) 67'; Vecino (yellow card) 71'	Report	Caldara (yellow card) 8'; Dramé (yellow card) 48'; Gagliardini (yellow card) 79'	Stadium: Stadio Artemio Franchi; Attendance: 27,529; Referee: Antonio Damato

23 October 2016 9	Cagliari	3–5	Fiorentina	Cagliari
15:00 CEST (UTC+02:00)	Di Gennaro 2'; Tachtsidis (yellow card) 33'; Capuano 62'; Murru (yellow card) 70'; Borriello 77'	Report	Astori (yellow card) 14'; Kalinić 20', 40', 53'; Bernardeschi 26', 32', (yellow card) 84'	Stadium: Stadio Sant'Elia; Attendance: 15,619; Referee: Carmine Russo

26 October 2016 10	Fiorentina	1–1	Crotone	Florence
20:45 CEST (UTC+02:00)	Astori 85'; Salcedo (yellow card) 87'	Report	Falcinelli 24'; Stoian (yellow card) 50'; Ceccherini (yellow card) 75'	Stadium: Stadio Artemio Franchi; Attendance: 22,983; Referee: Claudio Gavillucci

29 October 2016 11	Bologna	0–1	Fiorentina	Bologna
18:00 CEST (UTC+02:00)	Mbaye (yellow card) 28'; Gastaldello (red card) 29'; Džemaili (yellow card) 74'; Masina (yellow card) 87'	Report	Kalinić 31' (pen.), (yellow card) 41'; Salcedo (yellow card) 52'; Tomović (yellow card) 90'	Stadium: Stadio Renato Dall'Ara; Attendance: 20,780; Referee: Paolo Valeri

6 November 2016 12	Fiorentina	1–1	Sampdoria	Florence
18:00 CET (UTC+01:00)	Bernardeschi 37'; Gonzalo (yellow card) 45'; Milić (yellow card) 62'; Badelj (yellow card) 71'	Report	Fernandes (yellow card) 54'; Muriel 57'; Pereira (yellow card) 90+3'	Stadium: Stadio Artemio Franchi; Attendance: 23,559; Referee: Nicola Rizzoli

20 November 2016 13	Empoli	0–4	Fiorentina	Empoli
15:00 CET (UTC+01:00)	Bellusci (yellow card) 39'	Report	Bernardeschi 26', 61'; Tello (yellow card) 35'; Tomović (yellow card) 37'; Iličić 47' (pen.), 67'; Valero (yellow card) 57'	Stadium: Stadio Carlo Castellani; Attendance: 10,769; Referee: Davide Massa

28 November 2016 14	Internazionale	4–2	Fiorentina	Milan
21:00 CET (UTC+01:00)	Brozović 3', (yellow card) 55'; Candreva 9'; Icardi 19', 90+1'; Kondogbia (yellow card) 39'; Miranda (yellow card) 58'; Melo (yellow card) 76'; Ansaldi (yellow card) 84'	Report	Kalinić 37'; Salcedo (yellow card) 41'; Gonzalo (red card) 45+1'; Iličić 62'; Badelj (yellow card) 82'; Valero (yellow card) 83'	Stadium: San Siro; Attendance: 40,588; Referee: Antonio Damato

4 December 2016 15	Fiorentina	2–1	Palermo	Florence
20:45 CET (UTC+01:00)	Bernardeschi 33' (pen.); Tomović (yellow card) 51'; Badelj (yellow card) 82'; Babacar 90+3'	Report	Morganella (yellow card) 30'; Aleesami (yellow card) 33'; Jajalo 49'	Stadium: Stadio Artemio Franchi; Attendance: 22,533; Referee: Piero Giacomelli

12 December 2016 16	Fiorentina	2–1	Sassuolo	Florence
19:00 CET (UTC+01:00)	Kalinić 10', 40', (yellow card) 90+3'; Salcedo (yellow card) 20'; Astori (yellow card) 67'	Report	Peluso (yellow card) 65'; Acerbi 76'	Stadium: Stadio Artemio Franchi; Attendance: 22,049; Referee: Michael Fabbri

15 December 2016 3	Genoa	1–0	Fiorentina	Genoa
20:00 CET (UTC+01:00)	Veloso (yellow card) 27'; Lazović 37', (yellow card) 77'; Ninković (yellow card) 59'	Report	Tomović (yellow card) 19'; Badelj (yellow card) 85'	Stadium: Stadio Luigi Ferraris; Attendance: 20,651; Referee: Marco Guida
Note: Match originally scheduled for 11 September; play was stopped during the first half due to excessive rain, and was resumed from the point of suspension.

18 December 2016 17	Lazio	3–1	Fiorentina	Rome
15:00 CET (UTC+01:00)	Keita 23'; Biglia 45+4' (pen.); Bastos (yellow card) 57'; Radu 90'	Report	Tomović (yellow card) 26'; Olivera (yellow card) 49'; Zárate 64'; Bernardeschi (yellow card) 75'; Astori (yellow card) 77'; Sánchez (yellow card) 85'	Stadium: Stadio Olimpico; Attendance: 20,000; Referee: Massimiliano Irrati

22 December 2016 18	Fiorentina	3–3	Napoli	Florence
20:45 CET (UTC+01:00)	Kalinić (yellow card) 3'; Olivera (yellow card) 45+3'; Bernardeschi 51', 69', (yellow card) 70'; Tomović (yellow card) 53'; Zárate 82', (yellow card) 84'	Report	Albiol (yellow card) 1'; Insigne 25'; Reina (yellow card) 45+1'; Maksimović (yellow card) 50'; Mertens 68'; Gabbiadini 90+4' (pen.)	Stadium: Stadio Artemio Franchi; Attendance: 26,181; Referee: Paolo Tagliavento

15 January 2017 20	Fiorentina	2–1	Juventus	Florence
20:45 CET (UTC+01:00)	Vecino (yellow card) 29'; Kalinić 37', (yellow card) 90'; Chiesa (yellow card) 53'; Badelj 54'	Report	Sturaro (yellow card) 26'; Chiellini (yellow card) 33'; Higuaín 58'; Alex Sandro (yellow card) 82'; Bonucci (yellow card) 88'; Dybala (yellow card) 90+4'	Stadium: Stadio Artemio Franchi; Attendance: 34,085; Referee: Luca Banti

21 January 2017 21	Chievo	0–3	Fiorentina	Verona
18:00 CET (UTC+01:00)	Birsa (yellow card) 17'; Cesar (yellow card) 40'; Meggiorini (yellow card) 58'	Report	Tello 18'; Sánchez (yellow card) 36'; Babacar 52' (pen.); Bernardeschi (yellow card) 65'; Chiesa 90+4'	Stadium: Stadio Marc'Antonio Bentegodi; Attendance: 8,500; Referee: Fabio Maresca

28 January 2017 22	Fiorentina	3–3	Genoa	Florence
15:00 CET (UTC+01:00)	Iličić 17'; Chiesa 50'; Badelj (yellow card) 54'; Kalinić 62'; Olivera (yellow card) 84'; Bernardeschi (red card) 85'; Astori (yellow card) 89'	Report	Cofie (yellow card) 27'; Burdisso (yellow card) 37'; Simeone (yellow card) 45', (goal) 57', 86' (pen.); Hiljemark 59'; Laxalt (yellow card) 66'	Stadium: Stadio Artemio Franchi; Attendance: 27,301; Referee: Daniele Orsato

1 February 2017 19	Pescara	1–2	Fiorentina	Pescara
20:45 CET (UTC+01:00)	Caprari 15'; Benali (yellow card) 34'; Gyömbér (yellow card) 53'; Biraghi (yellow card) 54'; Bruno (yellow card) 57'	Report	Tomović (yellow card) 17'; Vecino (yellow card) 38'; Badelj (yellow card) 50'; Tello 68', 90+5'	Stadium: Stadio Adriatico – Giovanni Cornacchia; Attendance: 12,885; Referee: Carmine Russo
Note: Postponed from 8 January due to inclement weather.

7 February 2017 23	Roma	4–0	Fiorentina	Rome
20:45 CET (UTC+01:00)	Strootman (yellow card) 18'; Džeko 39', 83'; De Rossi (yellow card) 56'; Fazio 58'; Nainggolan 75'	Report	Sánchez (yellow card) 35'; Valero (yellow card) 41'; Gonzalo (yellow card) 57'	Stadium: Stadio Olimpico; Attendance: 25,394; Referee: Massimiliano Irrati

11 February 2017 24	Fiorentina	3–0	Udinese	Florence
20:45 CET (UTC+01:00)	Bernardeschi (yellow card) 30', (goal) 80' (pen.); Valero 41'; Babacar 62'; Milić (yellow card) 83'	Report	Hallfreðsson (yellow card) 38'; Fofana (yellow card) 79'	Stadium: Stadio Artemio Franchi; Attendance: 24,360; Referee: Maurizio Mariani

19 February 2017 25	Milan	2–1	Fiorentina	Milan
20:45 CET (UTC+01:00)	Kucka 16'; Deulofeu 31'; Vangioni (yellow card) 45+1'; Gómez (yellow card) 51'; Suso (yellow card) 74'	Report	Kalinić 20'; Salcedo (yellow card) 44'; Vecino (yellow card) 52'	Stadium: San Siro; Attendance: 32,743; Referee: Paolo Valeri

27 February 2017 26	Fiorentina	2–2	Torino	Florence
20:45 CET (UTC+01:00)	Saponara 8', (yellow card) 42'; Kalinić 38'	Report	Lukić (yellow card) 27'; Benassi (yellow card) 34'; Belotti 65', 85'	Stadium: Stadio Artemio Franchi; Attendance: 23,260; Referee: Piero Giacomelli

5 March 2017 27	Atalanta	0–0	Fiorentina	Bergamo
12:30 CET (UTC+01:00)	D'Alessandro (yellow card) 35'; Masiello (yellow card) 53'	Report	Chiesa (yellow card) 31'; Iličić (yellow card) 50'; Gonzalo (yellow card) 54'; Astori (yellow card) 62'	Stadium: Stadio Atleti Azzurri d'Italia; Attendance: 18,919; Referee: Marco Guida

12 March 2017 28	Fiorentina	1–0	Cagliari	Florence
20:45 CET (UTC+01:00)	Tomović (yellow card) 56'; Astori (yellow card) 61'; Kalinić 90+2'	Report	Miangue (yellow card) 77'	Stadium: Stadio Artemio Franchi; Attendance: 25,656; Referee: Claudio Gavillucci

19 March 2017 29	Crotone	0–1	Fiorentina	Crotone
15:00 CET (UTC+01:00)	Cordaz (yellow card) 41'	Report	Gonzalo (yellow card) 61'; Kalinić 90'	Stadium: Stadio Ezio Scida; Attendance: 7,997; Referee: Luca Pairetto

2 April 2017 30	Fiorentina	1–0	Bologna	Florence
15:00 CEST (UTC+02:00)	Babacar 51'; Badelj (yellow card) 59'; Tomović (yellow card) 70'; Astori (yellow card) 79'	Report	Destro (yellow card) 29'; Krejčí (yellow card) 90'	Stadium: Stadio Artemio Franchi; Attendance: 27,496; Referee: Daniele Doveri

9 April 2017 31	Sampdoria	2–2	Fiorentina	Genoa
12:30 CEST (UTC+02:00)	Fernandes 5'; Praet (yellow card) 67'; Álvarez 71', (yellow card) 75'	Report	Gonzalo (yellow card) 25', (goal) 60'; Babacar 89'	Stadium: Stadio Luigi Ferraris; Attendance: 19,347; Referee: Carmine Russo

15 April 2017 32	Fiorentina	1–2	Empoli	Florence
15:00 CEST (UTC+02:00)	Tello 64'; Tomović (yellow card) 69'; Iličić (yellow card) 86'; Olivera (yellow card) 90'; Valero (yellow card) 90+4'; Kalinić (red card) 90+5'	Report	Croce (yellow card) 35'; El Kaddouri 37'; Veseli (yellow card) 54'; Krunić (yellow card) 55'; Barba (yellow card) 73'; Dioussé (yellow card) 82'; Pasqual 90+3' (pen.)	Stadium: Stadio Artemio Franchi; Attendance: 26,195; Referee: Paolo Mazzoleni

22 April 2017 33	Fiorentina	5–4	Internazionale	Florence
20:45 CEST (UTC+02:00)	Vecino 23', 64'; Astori 62', (yellow card) 75'; Babacar 70', 79'; Sánchez (yellow card) 78'; Cristóforo (yellow card) 90+5'	Report	Perišić 29'; Icardi 34', 88', 90+1'; Handanović (yellow card) 90+5'	Stadium: Stadio Artemio Franchi; Attendance: 30,001; Referee: Paolo Valeri

30 April 2017 34	Palermo	2–0	Fiorentina	Palermo
15:00 CEST (UTC+02:00)	Nestorovski (yellow card) 20'; Diamanti 32', (yellow card) 55'; Aleesami 90'	Report	Salcedo (yellow card) 31'; Astori (yellow card) 63' (yellow-red card) 87'; Badelj (yellow card) 87'	Stadium: Stadio Renzo Barbera; Attendance: 10,327; Referee: Paolo Tagliavento

7 May 2017 35	Sassuolo	2–2	Fiorentina	Reggio Emilia
15:00 CEST (UTC+02:00)	Ragusa (yellow card) 25'; Berardi (yellow card) 28'; Adjapong (yellow card) 32'; Politano 74' (pen.); Sensi (yellow card) 82'; Iemmello 85'; Ricci (yellow card) 90+3'	Report	Gonzalo (yellow card) 32' (yellow-red card) 72'; Chiesa 37', (yellow card) 39'; Vecino (yellow card) 48'; Bernardeschi 90+4'	Stadium: Mapei Stadium – Città del Tricolore; Attendance: 11,152; Referee: Claudio Gavillucci

13 May 2017 36	Fiorentina	3–2	Lazio	Florence
18:00 CEST (UTC+02:00)	Astori (yellow card) 26'; Babacar 67'; Kalinić 73'; Lombardi 76' (o.g.); Valero (yellow card) 90+1'	Report	Parolo (yellow card) 26'; Keita 55'; Radu (yellow card) 64'; Murgia 81'; Hoedt (yellow card) 90+3'	Stadium: Stadio Artemio Franchi; Attendance: 25,770; Referee: Domenico Celi

20 May 2017 37	Napoli	4–1	Fiorentina	Naples
20:45 CEST (UTC+02:00)	Koulibaly 8', (yellow card) 49'; Insigne 36'; Albiol (yellow card) 43'; Mertens 57', 64'	Report	Vecino (yellow card) 58'; Iličić 60'	Stadium: Stadio San Paolo; Attendance: 49,519; Referee: Nicola Rizzoli

28 May 2017 38	Fiorentina	2–2	Pescara	Florence
20:45 CEST (UTC+02:00)	Chiesa (yellow card) 36' (yellow-red card) 38'; Astori (yellow card) 65'; Saponara 66'; Hagi (yellow card) 77'; Vecino 85'	Report	Caprari 15'; Campagnaro (yellow card) 42'; Bahebeck 65'	Stadium: Stadio Artemio Franchi; Attendance: 24,519; Referee: Daniele Martinelli

=== Coppa Italia ===
11 January 2017 Round of 16	Fiorentina	1–0	Chievo	Florence
17:30 CET (UTC+01:00)	Tomović (yellow card) 52'; Vecino (yellow card) 61'; Badelj (yellow card) 64'; Kalinić (yellow card) 65'; Zárate (red card) 71'; Bernardeschi 90+3' (pen.)	Report	Radovanović (yellow card) 17' (yellow-red card) 45+3'; Castro (yellow card) 36'; Gobbi (yellow card) 88'; Sorrentino (yellow card) 90+2'	Stadium: Stadio Artemio Franchi; Attendance: 6,477; Referee: Domenico Celi

24 January 2017 Quarter-finals	Napoli	1–0	Fiorentina	Naples
20:45 CET (UTC+01:00)	Hysaj (yellow card) 67' (yellow-red card) 90'; Callejón 71'; Insigne (yellow card) 90+3'	Report	Sánchez (yellow card) 28'; Olivera (yellow card) 37' (red card) 90+4'; Astori (yellow card) 45+1'; Tomović (yellow card) 62'; Chiesa (yellow card) 90+4'	Stadium: Stadio San Paolo; Attendance: 31,850; Referee: Daniele Doveri

=== UEFA Europa League ===
==== Group stage ====
Pos	Team	Pld	W	D	L	GF	GA	GD	Pts	Qualification	FIO	PAOK	QRB	LIB
1	(Italy) Fiorentina	6	4	1	1	15	6	+9	13	Advance to knockout phase	—	2–3	5–1	3–0
2	(Greece) PAOK	6	3	1	2	7	6	+1	10	Advance to knockout phase	0–0	—	0–1	2–0
3	(Azerbaijan) Qarabağ	6	2	1	3	7	12	−5	7		1–2	2–0	—	2–2
4	(Czech Republic) Slovan Liberec	6	1	1	4	7	12	−5	4		1–3	1–2	3–0	—

Source: UEFA
Rules for classification: Group stage tiebreakers

15 September 2016 1	PAOK (Greece)	0–0	(Italy) Fiorentina	Thessaloniki, Greece
21:05 CEST (UTC+02:00)	Léo Matos (yellow card) 15'; Rodrigues (yellow card) 35'; Athanasiadis (yellow card) 54'; Shakhov (yellow card) 67'; Varela (yellow card) 90+3'	Report	Kalinić (yellow card) 36'; Iličić (yellow card) 45+1'; Gonzalo (yellow card) 54'	Stadium: Toumba Stadium; Attendance: 20,904; Referee: Slavko Vinčić (Slovenia)

29 September 2016 2	Fiorentina (Italy)	5–1	(Azerbaijan) Qarabağ	Florence, Italy
19:00 CEST (UTC+02:00)	Sánchez (yellow card) 18'; Babacar 39', 45+2'; Kalinić 43'; Zárate 63', 78', (yellow card) 64'	Report	Yunuszade (red card) 30'; Medvedev (yellow card) 38'; Míchel (yellow card) 88'; Ndlovu 90+2'	Stadium: Stadio Artemio Franchi; Attendance: 14,145; Referee: Oliver Drachta (Austria)

20 October 2016 3	Slovan Liberec (Czech Republic)	1–3	(Italy) Fiorentina	Liberec, Czech Republic
19:00 CEST (UTC+02:00)	Breite (yellow card) 12' (yellow-red card) 84'; Karafiát (yellow card) 18'; Navrátil (yellow card) 53'; Ševčík 58'	Report	Kalinić 8', 23'; Tomović (yellow card) 50'; Valero (yellow card) 66'; Babacar 70'; Bernardeschi (yellow card) 81'	Stadium: Stadion u Nisy; Attendance: 9,037; Referee: Serdar Gözübüyük (Netherlands)

3 November 2016 4	Fiorentina (Italy)	3–0	(Czech Republic) Slovan Liberec	Florence, Italy
21:05 CET (UTC+01:00)	Iličić 30' (pen.); Tomović (yellow card) 41'; Kalinić 43'; Cristóforo 73'	Report	Súkenník (yellow card) 6'; Bartošák (yellow card) 32'	Stadium: Stadio Artemio Franchi; Attendance: 11,583; Referee: Aleksandar Stavrev (Macedonia)

24 November 2016 5	Fiorentina (Italy)	2–3	(Greece) PAOK	Florence, Italy
19:00 CET (UTC+01:00)	Bernardeschi 33'; Babacar 50'	Report	Shakhov 5'; Djalma 26'; Crespo (yellow card) 45'; Leovac (yellow card) 63'; Pelkas (yellow card) 85'; Rodrigues 90+3'	Stadium: Stadio Artemio Franchi; Attendance: 12,793; Referee: Stephan Klossner (Switzerland)

8 December 2016 6	Qarabağ (Azerbaijan)	1–2	(Italy) Fiorentina	Baku, Azerbaijan
17:00 CET (UTC+01:00)	Gurbanov (yellow card) 15'; Reynaldo 73'; Guseynov (yellow card) 86'	Report	Chiesa (yellow card) 19' (yellow-red card) 84', (goal) 76'; Vecino 60'	Stadium: Tofiq Bahramov Republican Stadium; Attendance: 21,750; Referee: Ivan Bebek (Croatia)

==== Knockout phase ====
===== Round of 32 =====
16 February 2017 First leg	Borussia Mönchengladbach (Germany)	0–1	(Italy) Fiorentina	Mönchengladbach, Germany
19:00 CET (UTC+01:00)	Kramer (yellow card) 90+2'	Report	Bernardeschi 44', (yellow card) 59'; Badelj (yellow card) 64'	Stadium: Borussia-Park; Attendance: 41,863; Referee: Jesús Gil Manzano (Spain)

23 February 2017 Second leg	Fiorentina (Italy)	2–4 (3–4 agg.)	(Germany) Borussia Mönchengladbach	Florence, Italy
21:05 CET (UTC+01:00)	Kalinić 16'; Vecino (yellow card) 23'; Valero 29'; Olivera (yellow card) 45'	Report	Stindl 44' (pen.), 47', 55', (yellow card) 76'; Christensen 60'; Kramer (yellow card) 67'	Stadium: Stadio Artemio Franchi; Attendance: 24,712; Referee: Artur Soares Dias (Portugal)

== Statistics ==
=== Appearances and goals ===
No.	Pos	Nat	Player	Total		Serie A		Coppa Italia		Europa League	
No.	Pos	Nat	Player	Apps	Goals	Apps	Goals	Apps	Goals	Apps	Goals
Goalkeepers
12	GK	(Romania) ROU	Ciprian Tătărușanu	44	0	35	0	2	0	7	0
23	GK	(Italy) ITA	Giacomo Satalino	0	0	0	0	0	0	0	0
57	GK	(Italy) ITA	Marco Sportiello	2	0	2	0	0	0	0	0
97	GK	(Poland) POL	Bartłomiej Drągowski	1	0	1	0	0	0	0	0
Defenders
2	DF	(Argentina) ARG	Gonzalo Rodríguez	33	1	26	1	0	0	7	0
4	DF	(France) FRA	Sebastian De Maio	9	0	6	0	1	0	2	0
13	DF	(Italy) ITA	Davide Astori	40	2	33	2	1	0	6	0
15	DF	(Uruguay) URU	Maximiliano Olivera	26	0	13+5	0	2	0	6	0
18	DF	(Mexico) MEX	Carlos Salcedo	20	0	15+3	0	0	0	2	0
31	DF	(Croatia) CRO	Hrvoje Milić	19	0	16+1	0	0	0	2	0
40	DF	(Serbia) SRB	Nenad Tomović	34	0	21+4	0	2	0	6+1	0
Midfielders
5	MF	(Croatia) CRO	Milan Badelj	41	2	29+4	2	2	0	6	0
6	MF	(Colombia) COL	Carlos Sánchez	41	1	23+8	1	2	0	4+4	0
8	MF	(Uruguay) URU	Matías Vecino	40	4	26+5	3	2	0	5+2	1
19	MF	(Uruguay) URU	Sebastián Cristóforo	27	1	7+12	0	1+1	0	5+1	1
20	MF	(Spain) ESP	Borja Valero	39	2	30+1	1	0+2	0	5+1	1
21	MF	(Italy) ITA	Riccardo Saponara	11	2	4+7	2	0	0	0	0
24	MF	(Romania) ROU	Ianis Hagi	2	0	0+2	0	0	0	0	0
72	MF	(Slovenia) SVN	Josip Iličić	35	6	23+6	5	0+2	0	2+2	1
Forwards
9	FW	(Croatia) CRO	Nikola Kalinić	41	20	26+6	15	2	0	6+1	5
10	FW	(Italy) ITA	Federico Bernardeschi	42	14	27+5	11	2	1	5+3	2
16	FW	(Spain) ESP	Cristian Tello	41	4	22+14	4	0	0	3+2	0
25	FW	(Italy) ITA	Federico Chiesa	34	4	17+10	3	2	0	3+2	1
26	FW	(United States) USA	Joshua Pérez	1	0	0+1	0	0	0	0	0
30	FW	(Senegal) SEN	Khouma Babacar	31	14	13+9	10	0+1	0	5+3	4
32	FW	(Slovenia) SVN	Jan Mlakar	1	0	0+1	0	0	0	0	0
Players transferred out during the season
1	GK	(Italy) ITA	Luca Lezzerini	2	0	0+1	0	0	0	1	0
7	FW	(Argentina) ARG	Mauro Zárate	9	4	1+6	2	1	0	0+1	2
17	DF	(Netherlands) NED	Kevin Diks	2	0	0+2	0	0	0	0	0
22	FW	(Italy) ITA	Giuseppe Rossi	1	0	0+1	0	0	0	0	0
28	DF	(Spain) ESP	Marcos Alonso	2	0	2	0	0	0	0	0

Last updated: 28 May 2017
Source: Competitions

=== Goalscorers ===
Rank	No.	Pos	Nat	Name	Serie A	Coppa Italia	UEFA EL	Total
1	9	FW	(Croatia)	Nikola Kalinić	15	0	5	20
2	10	FW	(Italy)	Federico Bernardeschi	11	1	2	14
2	30	FW	(Senegal)	Khouma Babacar	10	0	4	14
4	72	MF	(Slovenia)	Josip Iličić	5	0	1	6
5	7	FW	(Argentina)	Mauro Zárate	2	0	2	4
5	8	MF	(Uruguay)	Matías Vecino	3	0	1	4
5	16	FW	(Spain)	Cristian Tello	4	0	0	4
5	25	FW	(Italy)	Federico Chiesa	3	0	1	4
9	5	MF	(Croatia)	Milan Badelj	2	0	0	2
9	13	DF	(Italy)	Davide Astori	2	0	0	2
9	20	MF	(Spain)	Borja Valero	1	0	1	2
9	21	MF	(Italy)	Riccardo Saponara	2	0	0	2
13	2	DF	(Argentina)	Gonzalo Rodríguez	1	0	0	1
13	6	MF	(Colombia)	Carlos Sánchez	1	0	0	1
13	19	MF	(Uruguay)	Sebastián Cristóforo	0	0	1	1
Own goal					1	0	0	1
Totals					63	1	18	82

Last updated: 28 May 2017

=== Clean sheets ===
Rank	No.	Pos	Nat	Name	Serie A	Coppa Italia	UEFA EL	Total
1	12	GK	(Romania)	Ciprian Tătărușanu	12*	1	3	16
8	1	GK	(Italy)	Luca Lezzerini	1*	0	0	1
Totals					12	1	3	16

* Includes one shared clean sheet against Chievo.

Last updated: 28 May 2017

=== Disciplinary record ===
No.	Pos	Nat	Name	Serie A			Coppa Italia			UEFA EL			Total		
No.	Pos	Nat	Name	Booked	(yellow card) (yellow-red card)	Sent off (straight red)	Booked	(yellow card) (yellow-red card)	Sent off (straight red)	Booked	(yellow card) (yellow-red card)	Sent off (straight red)	Booked	(yellow card) (yellow-red card)	Sent off (straight red)
1	GK	(Italy)	Luca Lezzerini	0	0	0	0	0	0	0	0	0	0	0	0
12	GK	(Romania)	Ciprian Tătărușanu	0	0	0	0	0	0	0	0	0	0	0	0
23	GK	(Italy)	Giacomo Satalino	0	0	0	0	0	0	0	0	0	0	0	0
57	GK	(Italy)	Marco Sportiello	0	0	0	0	0	0	0	0	0	0	0	0
97	GK	(Poland)	Bartłomiej Drągowski	0	0	0	0	0	0	0	0	0	0	0	0
2	DF	(Argentina)	Gonzalo Rodríguez	6	1	1	0	0	0	1	0	0	7	1	1
4	DF	(France)	Sebastian De Maio	1	0	0	0	0	0	0	0	0	1	0	0
13	DF	(Italy)	Davide Astori	11	1	0	1	0	0	0	0	0	12	1	0
15	DF	(Uruguay)	Maximiliano Olivera	4	0	0	1	0	1	1	0	0	6	0	1
17	DF	(Netherlands)	Kevin Diks	0	0	0	0	0	0	0	0	0	0	0	0
18	DF	(Mexico)	Carlos Salcedo	7	0	0	0	0	0	0	0	0	7	0	0
31	DF	(Croatia)	Hrvoje Milić	4	0	0	0	0	0	0	0	0	4	0	0
40	DF	(Serbia)	Nenad Tomović	12	0	0	2	0	0	2	0	0	16	0	0
5	MF	(Croatia)	Milan Badelj	9	0	0	1	0	0	1	0	0	11	0	0
6	MF	(Colombia)	Carlos Sánchez	6	0	0	1	0	0	1	0	0	8	0	0
8	MF	(Uruguay)	Matías Vecino	7	0	0	1	0	0	1	0	0	9	0	0
11	MF	(Argentina)	Hernán Toledo	0	0	0	0	0	0	0	0	0	0	0	0
19	MF	(Uruguay)	Sebastián Cristóforo	1	0	0	0	0	0	0	0	0	1	0	0
20	MF	(Spain)	Borja Valero	5	0	0	0	0	0	1	0	0	6	0	0
21	MF	(Italy)	Riccardo Saponara	1	0	0	0	0	0	0	0	0	1	0	0
24	MF	(Romania)	Ianis Hagi	1	0	0	0	0	0	0	0	0	1	0	0
72	MF	(Slovenia)	Josip Iličić	2	0	0	0	0	0	1	0	0	3	0	0
7	FW	(Argentina)	Mauro Zárate	1	0	0	0	0	1	1	0	0	2	0	1
9	FW	(Croatia)	Nikola Kalinić	5	0	1	1	0	0	1	0	0	7	0	1
10	FW	(Italy)	Federico Bernardeschi	5	0	1	0	0	0	2	0	0	7	0	1
16	FW	(Spain)	Cristian Tello	1	0	0	0	0	0	0	0	0	1	0	0
25	FW	(Italy)	Federico Chiesa	3	1	0	1	0	0	0	1	0	4	2	0
26	FW	(United States)	Joshua Pérez	0	0	0	0	0	0	0	0	0	0	0	0
30	FW	(Senegal)	Khouma Babacar	0	0	0	0	0	0	0	0	0	0	0	0
Totals				92	3	3	9	0	2	13	1	0	114	4	5

Last updated: 28 May 2017
