= 2010–11 Villarreal CF season =

Villarreal
2010–11 season
- President: Fernando Roig
- Head coach: Juan Carlos Garrido
- Stadium: El Madrigal
- La Liga: 4th
- Copa del Rey: Quarter-finals
- UEFA Europa League: Semi-finals
- Top goalscorer: League: Giuseppe Rossi (18); All: Giuseppe Rossi (32)
- Highest home attendance: 25,000 vs Valencia
Home colours	Away colours

The 2010–11 season was Villarreal Club de Fútbol's 88th season in existence and the club's 11th consecutive season in the top flight of Spanish football. In addition to the domestic league, Villarreal participated in this season's editions of the Copa del Rey and the UEFA Europa League. The season covered the period from 1 July 2010 to 30 June 2011.

== Players ==
=== First-team squad ===
Note: Flags indicate national team as defined under FIFA eligibility rules; some limited exceptions apply. Players may hold more than one non-FIFA nationality.

No.	Pos.	Nation	Player
1	GK	ESP	Xavi Oliva
2	DF	ARG	Gonzalo Rodríguez (vice-captain)
3	DF	ESP	Joan Oriol
4	DF	ARG	Mateo Musacchio
5	DF	ESP	Carlos Marchena
6	DF	ESP	Ángel López
7	FW	BRA	Nilmar
8	MF	ESP	Santi Cazorla
9	FW	ARG	Marco Ruben
10	MF	ESP	Cani
11	DF	ESP	Joan Capdevila
13	GK	ESP	Diego López
15	DF	ESP	José Catalá
17	MF	ESP	Javier Matilla

No.	Pos.	Nation	Player
19	MF	ESP	Marcos Senna (captain)
20	MF	ESP	Borja Valero
21	MF	ESP	Bruno Soriano
22	FW	ITA	Giuseppe Rossi
24	DF	BRA	Cicinho (on loan from Roma)
25	GK	ESP	Juan Carlos
26	DF	ESP	Kiko
27	DF	ESP	Mario Gaspar
32	MF	ESP	Marcos Gullón
35	GK	ESP	Diego Mariño
37	FW	ESP	Iago Falqué
42	FW	DEN	Nicki Bille Nielsen
43	MF	GHA	Wakaso Mubarak

=== Out on loan ===
Note: Flags indicate national team as defined under FIFA eligibility rules; some limited exceptions apply. Players may hold more than one non-FIFA nationality.

No.	Pos.	Nation	Player
—	DF	ESP	Iván Marcano (at Getafe)
—	MF	ECU	Jefferson Montero (at Levante)
—	MF	ESP	Cristóbal Márquez (at Elche)
—	FW	USA	Jozy Altidore (at Bursaspor)

== Pre-season and friendlies ==
Win Draw Loss

29 July 2010 Friendly	Tottenham Hotspur (England)	1–4	(Spain) Villarreal	London, England
				Stadium: White Hart Lane; Attendance: 17,917

8 August 2010 Friendly	Villarreal (Spain)	2–2 (6–5 p)	(Turkey) Beşiktaş	Villarreal, Spain
	Cani 76'; Altidore 80'		Bobô 31'; Quaresma 40'	Stadium: Estadio El Madrigal
	Penalties
	Soriano (penalty scored); Senna (penalty scored); Capdevila (penalty scored); Catalá (penalty scored); Altidore (penalty scored); Musacchio (penalty scored)		(penalty scored) Hološko; (penalty scored) İnceman; (penalty scored) Tabata; (penalty scored) Uysal; (penalty scored) Nobre; (penalty missed) Dağ

== Competitions ==
=== Overall record ===
Competition	First match	Last match	Starting round	Final position	Record							
Competition	First match	Last match	Starting round	Final position	Pld	W	D	L	GF	GA	GD	Win %
La Liga	29 August 2010	21 May 2011	Matchday 1	4th	38	18	8	12	54	44	+10	47.37
Copa del Rey	27 October 2010	18 January 2011	Round of 32	Quarter-finals	6	2	3	1	10	9	+1	33.33
UEFA Europa League	19 August 2010	5 May 2011	Play-off round	Semi-finals	16	12	1	3	34	19	+15	75.00
Total					60	32	12	16	98	72	+26	53.33

Source: Competitions

=== La Liga ===
==== League table ====
Pos	Team	Pld	W	D	L	GF	GA	GD	Pts	Qualification or relegation
2	Real Madrid	38	29	5	4	102	33	+69	92	Qualification for the Champions League group stage
3	Valencia	38	21	8	9	64	44	+20	71	Qualification for the Champions League group stage
4	Villarreal	38	18	8	12	54	44	+10	62	Qualification for the Champions League play-off round
5	Sevilla	38	17	7	14	62	61	+1	58 (Note: SEV: 7 pts; ATH: 6 pts; ATM: 4 pts)	Qualification for the Europa League play-off round
6	Athletic Bilbao	38	18	4	16	59	55	+4	58	Qualification for the Europa League play-off round

Source: LFP, sportec.es, Yahoo! Sport
Rules for classification: 1st points; 2nd head-to-head points; 3rd head-to-head goal difference; 4th head-to-head goals scored; 5th goal difference; 6th number of goals scored; 7th Fair-play points

==== Results summary ====
Overall								Home						Away					
Pld	W	D	L	GF	GA	GD	Pts	W	D	L	GF	GA	GD	W	D	L	GF	GA	GD
38	18	8	12	54	44	+10	62	13	3	3	33	14	+19	5	5	9	21	30	−9

Source: La Liga

==== Results by round ====
Round	1	2	3	4	5	6	7	8	9	10	11	12	13	14	15	16	17	18	19	20	21	22	23	24	25	26	27	28	29	30	31	32	33	34	35	36	37	38
Ground	A	H	A	H	A	H	A	H	A	H	A	H	A	H	A	H	H	A	H	H	A	H	A	H	A	H	A	H	A	H	A	H	A	H	A	A	H	A
Result	L	W	W	W	W	W	D	W	D	W	L	D	W	W	L	W	W	L	W	W	W	L	L	D	D	W	L	D	W	L	L	W	L	W	D	D	L	L
Position	15	6	5	3	2	2	2	2	3	3	3	3	3	3	3	3	3	3	3	3	3	3	4	4	4	4	4	4	3	4	4	4	4	4	4	4	4	4

Source: La Liga
A = Away; H = Home; W = Win; D = Draw; L = Loss

==== Matches ====
The league fixtures were announced on 20 July 2010.

29 August 2010 1	Real Sociedad	1–0	Villarreal	San Sebastián
				Stadium: Anoeta

12 September 2010 2	Villarreal	4–0	Espanyol	Villarreal
				Stadium: El Madrigal

19 September 2010 3	Levante	1–2	Villarreal	Valencia
				Stadium: Estadi Ciutat de València

23 September 2010 4	Villarreal	1–0	Deportivo La Coruña	Villarreal
				Stadium: El Madrigal

27 September 2010 5	Málaga	2–3	Villarreal	Málaga
				Stadium: La Rosaleda

3 October 2010 6	Villarreal	2–0	Racing Santander	Villarreal
				Stadium: El Madrigal

18 October 2010 7	Hércules	2–2	Villarreal	Alicante
				Stadium: Estadio José Rico Pérez

24 October 2010 8	Villarreal	2–0	Atlético Madrid	Villarreal
				Stadium: El Madrigal

31 October 2010 9	Sporting Gijón	1–1	Villarreal	Gijón
				Stadium: El Molinón

7 November 2010 10	Villarreal	4–1	Athletic Bilbao	Villarreal
				Stadium: El Madrigal

13 November 2010 11	Barcelona	3–1	Villarreal	Barcelona
				Stadium: Camp Nou

20 November 2010 12	Villarreal	1–1	Valencia	Villarreal
				Stadium: El Madrigal

27 November 2010 13	Zaragoza	0–3	Villarreal	Zaragoza
				Stadium: La Romareda

5 December 2010 14	Villarreal	1–0	Sevilla	Villarreal
				Stadium: El Madrigal

11 December 2010 15	Getafe	1–0	Villarreal	Getafe
				Stadium: Coliseum Alfonso Pérez

18 December 2010 16	Villarreal	3–1	Mallorca	Villarreal
				Stadium: El Madrigal

3 January 2011 17	Villarreal	2–0	Almería	Villarreal
				Stadium: El Madrigal

9 January 2011 18	Real Madrid	4–2	Villarreal	Madrid
				Stadium: Santiago Bernabéu

15 January 2011 19	Villarreal	4–2	Osasuna	Villarreal
				Stadium: El Madrigal

23 January 2011 20	Villarreal	2–1	Real Sociedad	Villarreal
				Stadium: El Madrigal

30 January 2011 21	Espanyol	0–1	Villarreal	Barcelona
				Stadium: Cornellà-El Prat

5 February 2011 22	Villarreal	0–1	Levante	Villarreal
				Stadium: El Madrigal

13 February 2011 23	Deportivo La Coruña	1–0	Villarreal	A Coruña
				Stadium: Riazor

5 February 2011 24	Villarreal	1–1	Málaga	Villarreal
				Stadium: El Madrigal

27 February 2011 25	Racing Santander	2–2	Villarreal	Santander
				Stadium: El Sardinero

2 March 2011 26	Villarreal	1–0	Hércules	Villarreal
				Stadium: El Madrigal

5 March 2011 27	Atlético Madrid	3–1	Villarreal	Madrid
				Stadium: Vicente Calderón

13 March 2011 28	Villarreal	1–1	Sporting Gijón	Villarreal
				Stadium: El Madrigal

20 March 2011 29	Athletic Bilbao	0–1	Villarreal	Bilbao
				Stadium: San Mamés

2 April 2011 30	Villarreal	0–1	Barcelona	Villarreal
				Stadium: El Madrigal

10 April 2011 31	Valencia	5–0	Villarreal	Valencia
				Stadium: Mestalla

18 April 2011 32	Villarreal	1–0	Zaragoza	Villarreal
				Stadium: El Madrigal

24 April 2011 33	Sevilla	3–2	Villarreal	Seville
				Stadium: Ramón Sánchez Pizjuán

1 May 2011 34	Villarreal	2–1	Getafe	Villarreal
				Stadium: El Madrigal

8 May 2011 35	Mallorca	0–0	Villarreal	Palma
				Stadium: Iberostar

11 May 2011 36	Almería	0–0	Villarreal	Almería
				Stadium: Juegos Mediterráneos

15 May 2011 37	Villarreal	1–3	Real Madrid	Villarreal
				Stadium: El Madrigal

21 May 2011 38	Osasuna	1–0	Villarreal	Pamplona
				Stadium: El Sadar

=== Copa del Rey ===
==== Round of 32 ====
27 October 2010 First leg	Poli Ejido	1–1	Villarreal	El Ejido
21:00 CEST (UTC+2)	Moreno 89'	Report	Altidore 44'	Stadium: Estadio Municipal Santo Domingo; Attendance: 3,500; Referee: Carlos Velasco Carballo

10 November 2010 Second leg	Villarreal	2–0 (3–1 agg.)	Poli Ejido	Villarreal
21:00 CET (UTC+1)	Montero 17'; Altidore 90'	Report		Stadium: El Madrigal; Attendance: 10,000; Referee: Javier Turienzo Álvarez

==== Round of 16 ====
21 December 2010 First leg	Valencia	0–0	Villarreal	Valencia
22:00 CET (UTC+1)		Report		Stadium: Mestalla; Attendance: 20,000; Referee: Carlos Delgado Ferreiro

6 January 2011 Second leg	Villarreal	4–2 (4–2 agg.)	Valencia	Villarreal
18:00 CET (UTC+1)	Cazorla 46'; Rossi 49' (pen.), 90+3'; Ruben 63'	Report	Banega 5'; Soldado 23'	Stadium: El Madrigal; Attendance: 25,000; Referee: Rafael Ramírez Domínguez

==== Quarter-finals ====
12 January 2011 First leg	Villarreal	3–3	Sevilla	Villarreal
20:00 CET (UTC+1)	Cani 24'; Rossi 29'; Ruben 55'	Report	Negredo 39', 60'; Alexis 88'	Stadium: El Madrigal; Attendance: 23,000; Referee: Alberto Undiano Mallenco

18 January 2011 Second leg	Sevilla	3–0 (6–3 agg.)	Villarreal	Seville
22:00 CET (UTC+1)	Renato 7'; Kanouté 47'; Alexis 49'	Report		Stadium: Ramón Sánchez Pizjuán; Attendance: 30,000; Referee: Miguel Ángel Pérez Lasa

=== UEFA Europa League ===
==== Play-off round ====
19 August 2010 First leg	Villarreal (Spain)	5–0	(Belarus) Dnepr Mogilev	Villarreal, Spain
22:00 CEST (UTC+2)	Marchena 10'; Cazorla 17'; Valero 35'; Cani 45'; Nilmar 75'	Report		Stadium: El Madrigal; Attendance: 7,913; Referee: Simon Lee Evans (Wales)

26 August 2010 Second leg	Dnepr Mogilev (Belarus)	1–2 (1–7 agg.)	(Spain) Villarreal	Mogilev, Belarus
18:00 CEST (UTC+2)	Yurchenko 19'	Report	Nilmar 45+1'; Ruben 90+1'	Stadium: Spartak Stadium; Attendance: 6,542; Referee: Fırat Aydınus (Turkey)

==== Group stage ====
Pos	Team	Pld	W	D	L	GF	GA	GD	Pts	Qualification	VLR	PAOK	DZ	BRG
1	(Spain) Villarreal	6	4	0	2	8	5	+3	12	Advance to knockout phase	—	1–0	3–0	2–1
2	(Greece) PAOK	6	3	2	1	5	3	+2	11	Advance to knockout phase	1–0	—	1–0	1–1
3	(Croatia) Dinamo Zagreb	6	2	1	3	4	5	−1	7		2–0	0–1	—	0–0
4	(Belgium) Club Brugge	6	0	3	3	4	8	−4	3		1–2	1–1	0–2	—

Source: Soccerway

16 September 2010 1	Dinamo Zagreb (Croatia)	2–0	(Spain) Villarreal	Zagreb, Croatia
19:00 CEST (UTC+2)	Rukavina 18'; Sammir 80'	Report		Stadium: Stadion Maksimir; Attendance: 17,021; Referee: Pavel Královec (Czech Republic)

30 September 2010 2	Villarreal (Spain)	2–1	(Belgium) Club Brugge	Villarreal, Spain
21:05 CEST (UTC+2)	Rossi 41'; Gonzalo 56'	Report	Donk 45+2'	Stadium: El Madrigal; Attendance: 14,900; Referee: Maksim Layushkin (Russia)

21 October 2010 3	Villarreal (Spain)	1–0	(Greece) PAOK	Villarreal, Spain
21:05 CEST (UTC+2)	Ruben 38'	Report		Stadium: El Madrigal; Attendance: 14,760; Referee: Marcin Borski (Poland)

4 November 2010 4	PAOK (Greece)	1–0	(Spain) Villarreal	Thessaloniki, Greece
19:00 CET (UTC+1)	Vieirinha 70'	Report		Stadium: Toumba Stadium; Attendance: 22,779; Referee: Eric Braamhaar (Netherlands)

2 December 2010 5	Villarreal (Spain)	3–0	(Croatia) Dinamo Zagreb	Villarreal, Spain
21:05 CET (UTC+1)	Rossi 25' (pen.), 80'; Ruben 62'	Report		Stadium: El Madrigal; Attendance: 11,911; Referee: Manuel Gräfe (Germany)

15 December 2010 6	Club Brugge (Belgium)	1–2	(Spain) Villarreal	Bruges, Belgium
19:00 CET (UTC+1)	Kouemaha 28'	Report	Rossi 30', 34' (pen.)	Stadium: Jan Breydel Stadium; Attendance: 16,265; Referee: Milorad Mažić (Serbia)

==== Knockout phase ====
===== Round of 32 =====
17 February 2011 First leg	Napoli (Italy)	0–0	(Spain) Villarreal	Naples, Italy
19:00 CET (UTC+1)		Report		Stadium: Stadio San Paolo; Attendance: 47,529; Referee: Mark Clattenburg (England)

24 February 2011 Second leg	Villarreal (Spain)	2–1 (2–1 agg.)	(Italy) Napoli	Villarreal, Spain
21:05 CET (UTC+1)	Nilmar 43'; Rossi 45+1'	Report	Hamšík 18'	Stadium: El Madrigal; Attendance: 21,061; Referee: Cüneyt Çakır (Turkey)

===== Round of 16 =====
10 March 2011 First leg	Bayer Leverkusen (Germany)	2–3	(Spain) Villarreal	Leverkusen, Germany
19:00 CET (UTC+1)	Kadlec 33'; Castro 72'	Report	Rossi 42'; Nilmar 70', 90+4'	Stadium: BayArena; Attendance: 20,126; Referee: Paolo Tagliavento (Italy)

17 March 2011 Second leg	Villarreal (Spain)	2–1 (5–3 agg.)	(Germany) Bayer Leverkusen	Villarreal, Spain
21:05 CET (UTC+1)	Cazorla 33'; Rossi 61'	Report	Derdiyok 82'	Stadium: El Madrigal; Attendance: 19,779; Referee: Björn Kuipers (Netherlands)

===== Quarter-finals =====
7 April 2011 First leg	Villarreal (Spain)	5–1	(Netherlands) Twente	Villarreal, Spain
21:05 CEST (UTC+2)	Marchena 23'; Valero 43'; Nilmar 45+1', 81'; Rossi 55'	Report	Janko 90+1'	Stadium: El Madrigal; Attendance: 19,094; Referee: Aleksei Nikolaev (Russia)

14 April 2011 Second leg	Twente (Netherlands)	1–3 (2–8 agg.)	(Spain) Villarreal	Enschede, Netherlands
21:05 CEST (UTC+2)	Bajrami 32'	Report	Rossi 60' (pen.); Ruben 84' (pen.); Cani 90'	Stadium: De Grolsch Veste; Attendance: 23,500; Referee: William Collum (Scotland)

===== Semi-finals =====
28 April 2011 First leg	Porto (Portugal)	5–1	(Spain) Villarreal	Porto, Portugal
21:05 CEST (UTC+2)	Falcao 49' (pen.), 67', 75', 90' Guarín 61'	Report	Cani 45'	Stadium: Estádio do Dragão; Attendance: 44,719; Referee: Björn Kuipers (Netherlands)

5 May 2011 Second leg	Villarreal (Spain)	3–2 (4–7 agg.)	(Portugal) Porto	Villarreal, Spain
21:05 CEST (UTC+2)	Cani 17'; Capdevila 75'; Rossi 80' (pen.)	Report	Musacchio 39' (o.g.); Falcao 48'	Stadium: El Madrigal; Attendance: 18,523; Referee: Gianluca Rocchi (Italy)
