= Giuseppe Rossi =

American-born Italian footballer (born 1987)

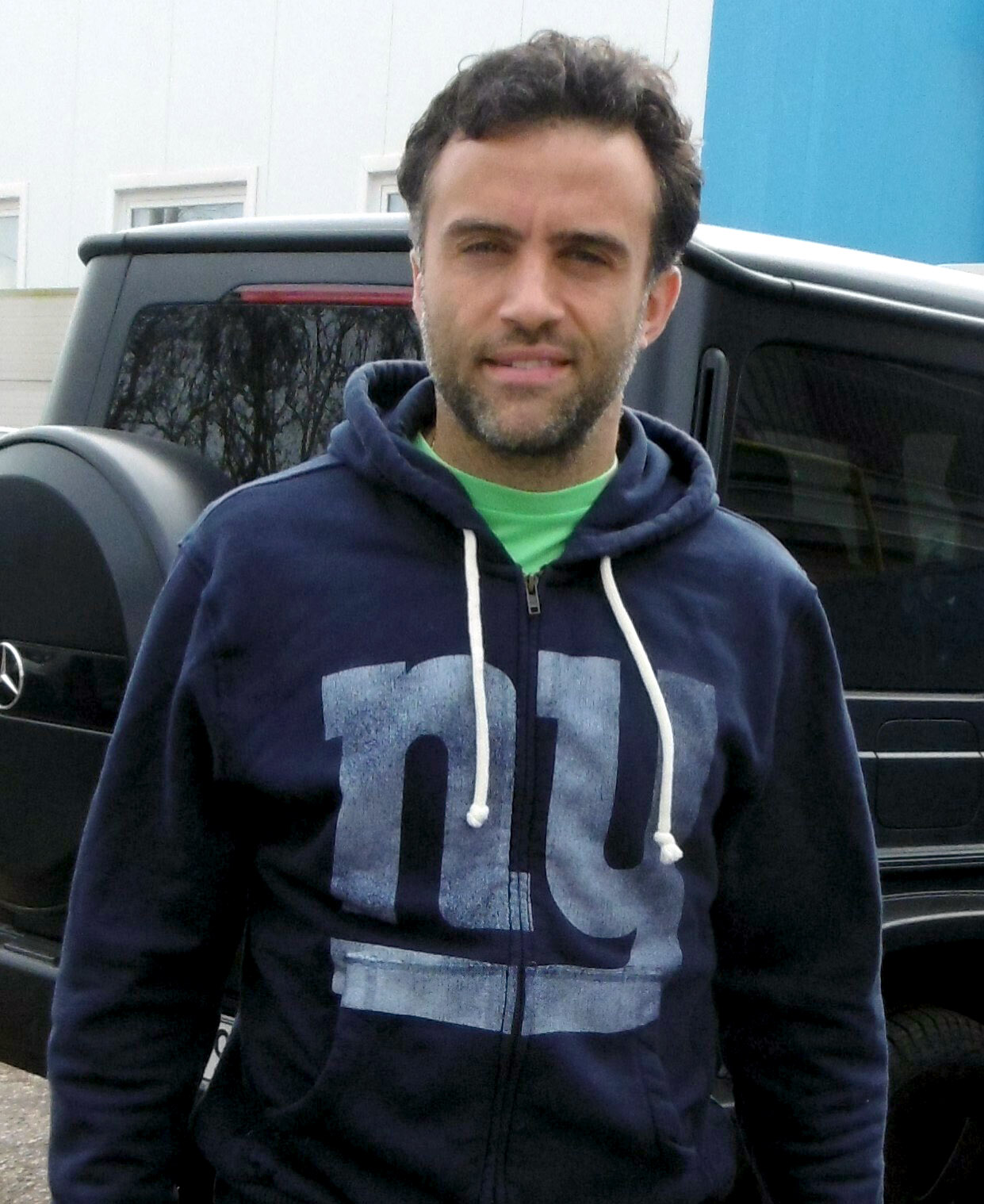
- Rossi in 2023

Personal information
- Full name: Giuseppe Rossi
- Date of birth: 1 February 1987 (age 39)
- Place of birth: Teaneck, New Jersey, United States
- Height: 1.73 m (5 ft 8 in)
- Position: Forward

Youth career
- 1996–1999: Clifton Stallions
- 2000–2004: Parma
- 2004: Manchester United

Senior career*
Years	Team	Apps	(Gls)
2004–2007	Manchester United	5	(1)
2006	→ Newcastle United (loan)	11	(0)
2007	→ Parma (loan)	19	(9)
2007–2013	Villarreal	136	(54)
2013–2017	Fiorentina	34	(16)
2016	→ Levante (loan)	17	(6)
2016–2017	→ Celta (loan)	18	(4)
2017–2018	Genoa	9	(1)
2020	Real Salt Lake	7	(1)
2021–2022	SPAL	14	(3)
2023	SPAL	5	(0)
Total		275	(95)

International career
2003	Italy U16	5	(3)
2003–2004	Italy U17	14	(6)
2004–2005	Italy U18	3	(0)
2006–2008	Italy U21	16	(5)
2008	Italy U23	6	(6)
2008–2014	Italy	30	(7)
- * Club domestic league appearances and goals

Giuseppe Rossi (Italian pronunciation: [dʒuˈzɛppe ˈrossi]; born 1 February 1987) is a former professional footballer who played as a forward. Born in the United States, he played for the Italy national team. He was most recently the Head of Soccer and Vice Chairman of USL League One club New York Cosmos.

Rossi spent most of his career in Europe with Villarreal and Fiorentina, in addition to spells with other clubs in England, Italy and Spain, before returning to his country of birth to join Real Salt Lake for a single season in 2020.

At international level, Rossi represented Italy at the 2008 Summer Olympics, and at the 2009 FIFA Confederations Cup, collecting thirty appearances and scoring seven goals at senior level between 2008 and 2014. Along with Mario Balotelli and Daniele De Rossi, he is Italy's all-time top scorer in the FIFA Confederations Cup, with two goals.

Due to his prolific performances in the Spanish La Liga, Rossi earned the nickname Pepito Rossi, a reference to his namesake Paolo Rossi, who was nicknamed Pablito following his goalscoring performances in Italy's victorious 1982 FIFA World Cup campaign in Spain.

== Early life ==
Rossi is Italian American, born to Italian immigrant parents in Teaneck, New Jersey. His father, Fernando Rossi from Fraine, Abruzzo, coached soccer and taught Italian and Spanish at Clifton High School. His mother, Cleonilde Rossi from Acquaviva d'Isernia, Molise, was also a language teacher at Clifton, and his sister, Tina, currently lives in the United States. Rossi played prep soccer at Clifton High School.

After his father died in 2010, Rossi began to wear the number 49, which was the year of his father's birth. In 2014, he switched back to the number 22 jersey.

On 1 December 2020, his daughter was born.

== Club career ==
=== Early career ===
When offered a spot on the youth team of Parma, Rossi (then 12) and his father moved to Italy until Manchester United bought his contract when he was 17. His first-team debut came on 20 November 2004, at home to Crystal Palace in the fifth round of the League Cup, as an 84th-minute substitute for David Bellion.

For his Premier League debut on 15 October 2005, he came on in the 78th minute for Ruud van Nistelrooy and nine minutes later scored the last goal in a 3–1 win over Sunderland at the Stadium of Light. On 18 January 2006, in an FA Cup third-round replay, he started and scored twice as United beat non-league Burton Albion 5–0. Although Rossi did not play in the League Cup final against Wigan Athletic, Nemanja Vidić (who made a seven-minute cameo at the end of the game) gave Rossi his medal in recognition of Rossi's contribution to the team's success in the earlier rounds.

At the start of the 2006–07 season, Rossi moved to Newcastle United on loan until 1 January 2007, where he was expected to gain some first team experience. He made his home debut on 24 September 2006. Rossi scored his only Newcastle goal in his first start on 25 October 2006, against Portsmouth in a League Cup third round tie at St James' Park.

For the second half of the season, he was again loaned out, this time to his former club Parma, scoring nine goals in 19 league appearances.

=== Villarreal ===
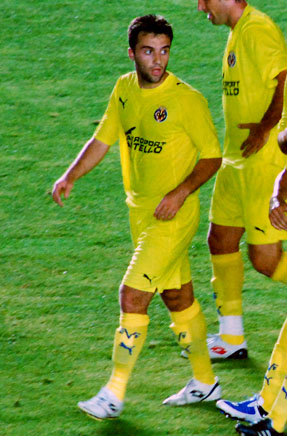
Rossi played for Villarreal for five-and-a-half years after joining from Manchester United in 2007.

On 31 July 2007, Manchester United confirmed that Rossi had been sold to Spanish club Villarreal for an undisclosed fee, reportedly around £6.6 million (€10 million). He scored his first goal for Villarreal on his debut against Valencia on 26 August 2007.

In his second season with Villarreal, Rossi had scored 12 goals in 30 league appearances, along with three goals in eight Champions League appearances. In January 2011, he signed a contract extension with Villarreal until 2016. The 2010–11 season proved to be his breakthrough season, as he scored 32 goals in 56 appearances in all competitions, helping the club to a fourth-place finish in La Liga, scoring 18 goals, which qualified them for the 2011–12 UEFA Champions League, also helping Villarreal to the semi-finals of the 2010–11 UEFA Europa League that season, scoring 11 goals, and the quarter-finals of the Copa del Rey. An anterior cruciate ligament injury on Rossi's right knee that he picked up in the 3–0 loss against Real Madrid on 26 October 2011 caused Rossi to be out for six months. Rossi re injured his anterior cruciate ligament of right knee in training on 13 April 2012, and was out for a further 10 months. At the end of his 6 year stay with Villarreal, he had scored 82 goals in 192 games in all competitions and became the club's all time top scorer. After 10 years of scoring his final goal for Villarreal in October 2011 in a match against Real Zaragoza, his record was surpassed by Gerard Moreno on 11 August 2021, after he scored a goal in the 2021 UEFA Super Cup match against Chelsea.

=== Fiorentina ===
On 4 January 2013, Fiorentina came to an agreement with Villarreal for the transfer of Rossi for a fee of approximately €11.8 million. On 7 January, Fiorentina held a press conference unveiling Rossi, where it was revealed the player had signed a four-year contract containing a €35 million release clause.

On 21 May, the final day of the 2012–13 Serie A season, Rossi made his debut for Fiorentina as a substitute in a 5–1 win over Pescara.

On 26 August, Rossi scored his first goal in 23 months in Fiorentina's opening match of the 2013–14 Serie A season – a 2–1 defeat of Catania. On 20 October, Rossi inspired Fiorentina to a 4–2 come from behind win over rivals Juventus, netting a 14-minute hat-trick that condemned Juve to their first defeat in Florence for 15 years.

On 5 January 2014, Rossi was substituted in Fiorentina's match against Livorno as he suffered a second-degree sprain of his medial collateral ligament in his right knee. The blow was dealt by Leandro Rinaudo, who tackled Rossi from behind in a manner so dirty that he drew international condemnation. Up to this point Rossi had been the leading goal scorer in Serie A with 14 goals in 18 league appearances.

Rossi returned from injury as a 69th-minute substitute in Fiorentina's 3–1 Coppa Italia final loss to Napoli on 3 May. On 6 May, he scored on his Serie A comeback – a 4–3 defeat to Sassuolo.

On 14 August 2014, Rossi injured his medial meniscus of right knee in training. On 5 September 2014 Fiorentina confirmed Rossi would be out for 4–5 months.

Rossi returned to the pitch on 30 August 2015, in a 3–1 away defeat to Torino; later that week he also agreed with his club to take a salary cut. On 1 October, he scored his first goal since coming back from his injury in Fiorentina's 4–0 away victory over Belenenses in the Europa League.

==== Loan to Levante ====
On 22 January 2016, Rossi returned to La Liga by signing a loan deal until end of the season with Levante, in order to gain playing time, and a place in the Italy national side at Euro 2016. He made his club debut on 31 January, scoring in a 3–1 away defeat to Sevilla. On 13 March at the Estadi Ciutat de València, he scored the only goal of a win over city rivals Valencia CF, managed by his former United teammate Gary Neville. On 8 May, he scored a late winner in a 2–1 home win over title contenders Atlético Madrid, although the result was not sufficient to prevent the team from being relegated.

==== Loan to Celta Vigo ====
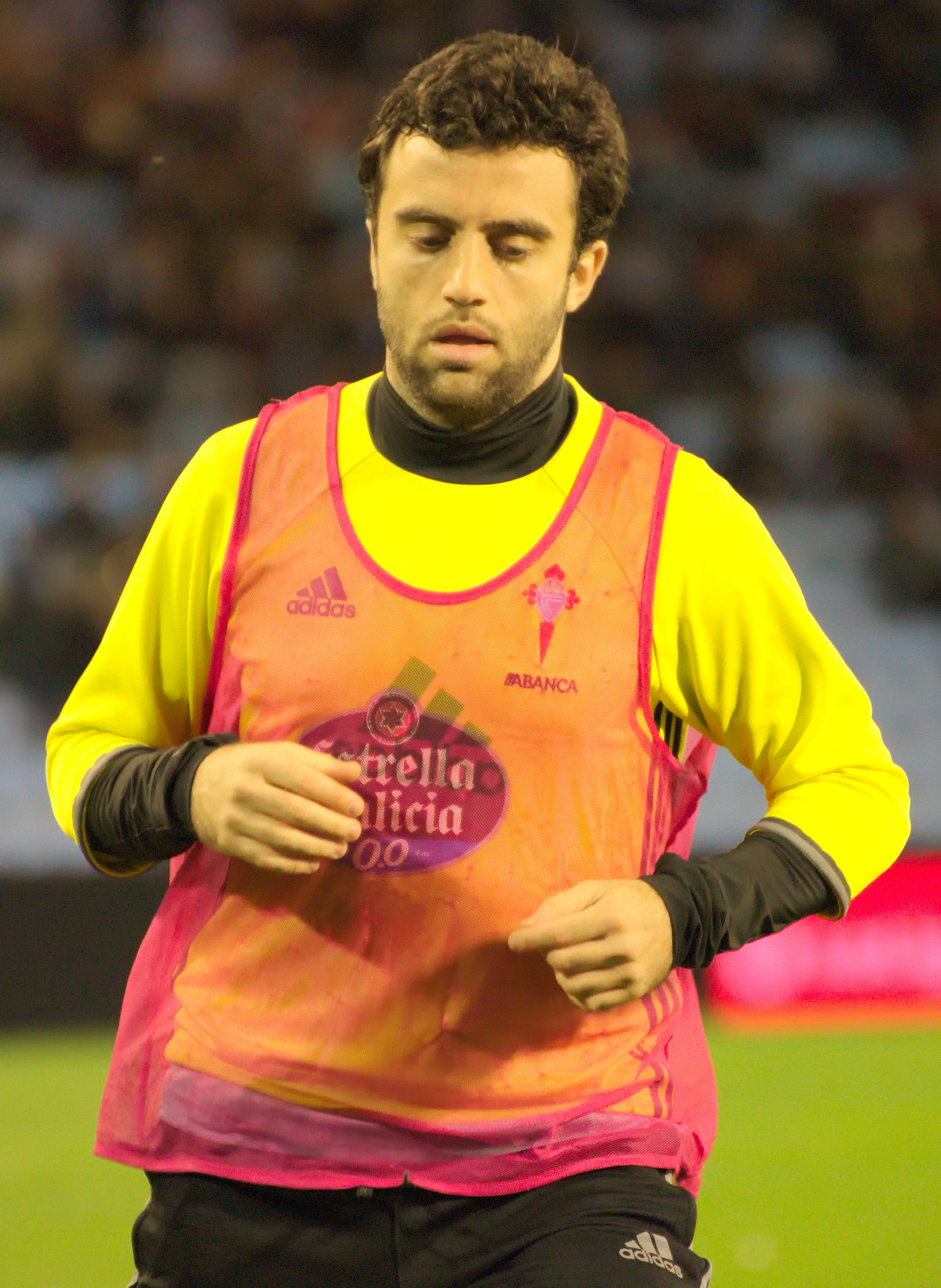
Rossi with Celta de Vigo in 2017

On 29 August 2016, Rossi signed a one-year contract with Celta de Vigo, with an option for another year. He scored his first goal for the club on his debut, which came in a 1–1 away draw against Standard Liège in Celta's opening group match of the Europa League. He made his league debut with the club on 18 September, coming on as a substitute in a 0–0 away draw against Osasuna. On 3 April 2017, Rossi scored a hat-trick in a 3–1 home win over Las Palmas in La Liga; this was his first goal since he scored against Espanyol on 25 September 2016, and his first hat-trick since 20 October 2013, when he scored three goals for Fiorentina in a 4–2 home win against Juventus. On 9 April 2017, Rossi suffered the fifth serious injury of his career when he ruptured the ACL in his left knee in a game against SD Eibar, and was consequently ruled out of action for at least 6 months. Rossi became a free agent in July after Fiorentina allowed his contract to expire and he subsequently rejected an offer by Celta to remain with the Spanish side until January 2018.

=== Genoa ===
On 4 December 2017, Rossi was signed by Genoa on a free transfer. He made his debut for the club on 20 December, coming on as a second-half substitute in a 2–0 away defeat against Juventus in the round of 16 of the Coppa Italia.

He left Genoa at the end of the 2017–18 season.

On 12 May 2018 Rossi failed a drug test following a Serie A match against Benevento, testing positive for the banned substance dorzolamide. Although the country's anti-doping prosecutor wanted Rossi to face a one-year ban for this offence, following a hearing with that took place on 1 October, Rossi was ultimately given a warning; afterward, Rossi's lawyer Sergio Puglisi claimed: "We don't understand how this substance ended up among Rossi's foods, there was no intentionality – the line of good faith and consistency prevailed." Rossi later tweeted: "A nightmare of four months is over. I only want to think about football."

=== 2018–19 free agency ===
In January 2019, Rossi started training with his former club, Manchester United. In February of that year, Rossi was reported to have been invited to train with MLS side Los Angeles FC. On 14 October, his former club Villarreal announced that Rossi would start training with their first team. In an interview with Italian daily newspaper Corriere della Sera in December 2019, he stated that he was "ready to help out any Serie A team".

=== Real Salt Lake ===
Following a trial with the MLS club, Rossi was announced as a Real Salt Lake player on 27 February 2020. He made his club debut on 29 February, coming on as a late second–half substitute in a 0–0 away draw against Orlando City in the MLS. His contract option was declined by Salt Lake following their 2020 season.

=== SPAL ===
On 19 November 2021, after a few weeks of training with the club squad, Rossi was formally announced as a new signing for Italian Serie B club SPAL, on a deal until the end of the season.

On 17 February 2023, after being without a club for half a year, Rossi returned to SPAL on a deal until the end of the season. He retired at the end of the 2022–23 season on 22 July 2023.

== International career ==
Rossi with Italy in 2011

Rossi represented Italy at almost every youth level from under-16 to under-21 levels. In 2006, he was invited to a pre-World Cup training camp with the United States national team by coach Bruce Arena but declined, stating his desire to play for Italy. He was called up for the 2007 Under-21 European Championship by Italy under-21 head coach Pierluigi Casiraghi. The following year, he scored four goals at the 2008 Summer Olympics, making him the top scorer of the tournament, despite only reaching the quarter-finals with Italy, following a 3–2 loss to Belgium on 16 August, in which he scored twice from the penalty spot; his other two goals came in the opening match of the competition – a 3–0 win against Honduras on 7 August, in which he scored the second goal of the game from a penalty – and in Italy's second group match on 10 August – a 3–0 win over Korea Republic – in which he scored the opening goal.

Italy national football team manager Marcello Lippi stated that had Rossi been fit, he would have received a call-up for the 2010 World Cup qualifiers in September 2008. Rossi was called up to the Italy squad in October 2008, making his senior debut for the national team as a second-half substitute in a 0–0 away draw against Bulgaria on 11 October, in a 2010 World Cup qualifier. Rossi scored his first goal for the Italy national team on 6 June 2009, in a friendly against Northern Ireland, at Pisa's Arena Garibaldi. He also scored two goals in a 3–1 win against his country of birth, the United States, in Italy's opening match of the 2009 FIFA Confederations Cup in South Africa on 15 June 2009, although Italy subsequently lost their next two matches and suffered a first-round elimination.

Rossi was included in Lippi's provisional 28-man 2010 FIFA World Cup squad, which had been announced in May, but failed to make the cut for the final 23-man squad.

On 17 November 2010, for his 18th cap for Italy, Rossi was picked by Italian manager Cesare Prandelli to wear the captain's armband for the first time ahead of the team's friendly against Romania.

After a two-year absence from the national team due to injury, which saw him miss out on a place at Euro 2012, Rossi appeared in a 2014 World Cup qualifying match on 15 October 2013, as Italy drew 2–2 against Armenia at home. On 13 May 2014, Rossi was named in Italy's provisional 30-man squad for the 2014 FIFA World Cup, however on 1 June, it was announced that Rossi had not made the final 23-man World Cup squad.

On 24 May 2016, Prandelli's successor as Italy's manager, Antonio Conte, released his 30-man shortlist for UEFA Euro 2016 roster; Rossi was not selected.

== Style of play ==
A quick and mobile left-footed forward, Rossi was known for his overall attacking and creative style of play, as well as his work-rate, movement off the ball, his powerful and accurate striking ability, and instincts in the box. Regarded as one of the most promising Italian players of his generation in his youth, his playing style has often been compared to that of compatriot Alessandro Del Piero, due to his acceleration, strong technical skills, range of passing, dribbling talents, and his ability to either score goals or pick out a pass and create chances for teammates; he was also compared to his namesake, 1982 World Cup-winning striker Paolo Rossi, due to his opportunism, pace, agility, and eye for goal.

In 2013, former Fiorentina playmaker Giancarlo Antognoni likened Rossi to fellow former Fiorentina number ten Roberto Baggio, "In terms of his touch and creativity." Giuseppe Rossi was known for his ability to both finish off chances and link-up well with midfielders; due to his abilities, he often dropped deep between the lines and was involved in the buildup of plays. Because of this, Rossi was able to play in a variety of attacking positions, including on the wings, as a supporting striker, as a lone-striker, and in an attacking midfield role. He was also an accurate penalty taker. Despite his talent, skill, and goalscoring ability, Rossi's playing time was limited in later seasons due to several recurring injury problems.

== Post-retirement ==
In September 2021, Rossi began his career as sports commentator for Calcio e Cappuccino, an American television program dedicated to the Serie A and broadcast on CBS Sports Network and can be found via streaming on Paramount+.

On 8 July 2025, Rossi joined North Jersey Pro Soccer, an expansion team in USL League One, as vice chairman and director of soccer. The club would adopt the New York Cosmos name and identity two days later.

In January 2026, he came under criticism in the media for some posts he made on X in support of ICE; he later removed his posts and apologized.

== Career statistics ==
=== Club ===
Appearances and goals by club, season and competition
Club	Season	League			National cup (Note: Includes FA Cup, Copa del Rey, Coppa Italia, and U.S. Open Cup)		Continental (Note: Includes UEFA Champions League, UEFA Cup/UEFA Europa League, and Leagues Cup)		Other (Note: Includes Football League Cup and MLS Cup Playoffs)		Total	
Club	Season	Division	Apps	Goals	Apps	Goals	Apps	Goals	Apps	Goals	Apps	Goals
Manchester United	2004–05	Premier League	0	0	0	0	0	0	2	0	2	0
Manchester United	2005–06	Premier League	5	1	2	2	2 (Note: Appearances in UEFA Champions League)	0	3	1	12	4
Manchester United	2006–07	Premier League	0	0	0	0	0	0	0	0	0	0
Manchester United	Total		5	1	2	2	2	0	5	1	14	4
Newcastle United (loan)	2006–07	Premier League	11	0	0	0	—		2	1	13	1
Parma (loan)	2006–07	Serie A	19	9	0	0	1 (Note: Appearance(s) in UEFA Cup)	0	—		20	9
Villarreal	2007–08	La Liga	27	11	5	2	5	0	—		37	13
Villarreal	2008–09	La Liga	30	12	1	0	8	3	—		39	15
Villarreal	2009–10	La Liga	34	10	4	2	8 (Note: Appearances in UEFA Europa League)	5	—		46	17
Villarreal	2010–11	La Liga	36	18	5	3	15	11	—		56	32
Villarreal	2011–12	La Liga	9	3	0	0	5	2	—		14	5
Villarreal	2012–13	Segunda División	0	0	0	0	—		—		0	0
Villarreal	Total		136	54	15	7	41	21	—		192	82
Fiorentina	2012–13	Serie A	1	0	0	0	—		—		1	0
Fiorentina	2013–14	Serie A	21	16	1	0	2	1	—		24	17
Fiorentina	2014–15	Serie A	0	0	0	0	0	0	—		0	0
Fiorentina	2015–16	Serie A	11	0	1	0	4	2	—		16	2
Fiorentina	2016–17	Serie A	1	0	0	0	0	0	—		1	0
Fiorentina	Total		34	16	2	0	6	3	—		42	19
Levante (loan)	2015–16	La Liga	17	6	0	0	—		—		17	6
Celta Vigo (loan)	2016–17	La Liga	18	4	4	1	7	1	—		29	6
Genoa	2017–18	Serie A	9	1	1	0	—		—		10	1
Real Salt Lake	2020	Major League Soccer	7 (Note: Includes three appearances in MLS is Back Tournament group stage)	1	—		—		0	0	7	1
SPAL	2021–22	Serie B	14	3	0	0	—		—		14	3
SPAL	2022–23	Serie B	5	0	0	0	—		—		5	0
SPAL	Total		19	3	0	0	—		—		19	3
Career total			275	95	24	10	57	25	7	2	363	132

=== International ===
Appearances and goals by national team and year
National team	Year	Apps	Goals
Italy	2008	2	0
Italy	2009	12	3
Italy	2010	4	0
Italy	2011	9	3
Italy	2012	0	0
Italy	2013	2	1
Italy	2014	1	0
Total		30	7

Scores and results list Italy's goal tally first, score column indicates score after each Rossi goal.

List of international goals scored by Giuseppe Rossi
No.	Date	Venue	Opponent	Score	Result	Competition	Ref.
1	6 June 2009	Arena Garibaldi, Pisa, Italy	Northern Ireland	1–0	3–0	Friendly	
2	15 June 2009	Loftus Versfeld Stadium, Pretoria, South Africa	United States	1–1	3–1	2009 FIFA Confederations Cup	
3	15 June 2009	Loftus Versfeld Stadium, Pretoria, South Africa	United States	3–1	3–1	2009 FIFA Confederations Cup	
4	9 February 2011	Signal Iduna Park, Dortmund, Germany	Germany	1–1	1–1	Friendly	
5	29 March 2011	Valeriy Lobanovskyi Dynamo Stadium, Kyiv, Ukraine	Ukraine	1–0	2–0	Friendly	
6	3 June 2011	Stadio Alberto Braglia, Modena, Italy	Estonia	1–0	3–0	UEFA Euro 2012 qualifying	
7	18 November 2013	Craven Cottage, London, England	Nigeria	1–0	2–2	Friendly	

== Honours ==
Manchester United

- Premier League: 2006–07
- Football League/EFL Cup: 2006

Individual

- Jimmy Murphy Young Player of the Year: 2004–05
- Denzil Haroun Reserve Team Player of the Year: 2005–06
- Olympic Golden Boot: 2008
- Pallone d'Argento: 2013–14
