= 2015–16 ACF Fiorentina season =

Fiorentina
2015–16 season
- President: Mario Cognigni
- Manager: Paulo Sousa
- Stadium: Stadio Artemio Franchi
- Serie A: 5th
- Coppa Italia: Round of 16
- UEFA Europa League: Round of 32
- Top goalscorer: League: Josip Iličić (13); All: Josip Iličić (15)
- Highest home attendance: 36,297 vs Roma (25 October 2015, Serie A)
- Lowest home attendance: 8,257 vs Carpi (16 December 2015, Coppa Italia)
- Average home league attendance: 28,734
Home colours	Away colours	Third colours

The 2015–16 season was the 89th season in ACF Fiorentina's history and their 78th in the top-flight of Italian football. Fiorentina finished the season in 5th place in Serie A, having topped the table early in the season. In the Coppa Italia, the club was eliminated in the round of 16, losing at home to newly promoted Carpi 1–0. Competing in the UEFA Europa League for the third season in a row, Fiorentina limped into second place in their group with a 3–1–2 record, and were eliminated in the Round of 32 by Tottenham Hotspur, 4–1 on aggregate. The 2015–16 season was also notable for being the first season since the 2011–12 season in which the club was not managed by Vincenzo Montella, who had achieved 4th-place finishes in each of his seasons with the club. Montella was replaced by Basel coach Paulo Sousa.

== Players ==
=== Squad information ===
Last updated on 15 May 2016
Appearances include league matches only

No.	Name	Nat	Position(s)	Date of birth (Age at end of season)	Signed from	Signed in	Contract ends	Apps.	Goals
Goalkeepers
12	Ciprian Tătărușanu	(Romania)	GK	9 February 1986 (aged 30)	(Romania) Steaua București	2014	2019	46	0
24	Luca Lezzerini	(Italy)	GK	24 March 1995 (aged 21)	(Italy) Youth Sector	2011	2016	2	0
33	Luigi Sepe	(Italy)	GK	8 May 1991 (aged 25)	(Italy) Napoli	2015	2016	0	0
Defenders
2	Gonzalo Rodríguez	(Argentina)	CB	10 April 1984 (aged 32)	(Spain) Villarreal	2012	2017	133	21
4	Nenad Tomović	(Serbia)	CB / RB	30 August 1987 (aged 28)	(Italy) Genoa	2012	2016	98	1
13	Davide Astori	(Italy)	CB	7 January 1987 (aged 29)	(Italy) Cagliari	2015	2016	33	0
23	Manuel Pasqual (C)	(Italy)	LB / LM	13 March 1982 (aged 34)	(Italy) Arezzo	2005	2016	302	7
25	Yohan Benalouane	(Tunisia)	CB	28 March 1987 (aged 29)	(England) Leicester City	2016	2016	0	0
28	Marcos Alonso	(Spain)	LB / LM	28 December 1990 (aged 25)	(England) Bolton Wanderers	2013	2016	56	4
32	Facundo Roncaglia	(Argentina)	CB / RB	10 February 1987 (aged 29)	(Argentina) Boca Juniors	2012	2016	67	4
Midfielders
5	Milan Badelj	(Croatia)	DM / CM	25 February 1989 (aged 27)	(Germany) Hamburg	2014	2018	48	2
6	Tino Costa	(Argentina)	CM	9 January 1985 (aged 31)	(Italy) Genoa	2016	2016	7	0
8	Matías Vecino	(Uruguay)	CM / AM	24 August 1991 (aged 24)	(Uruguay) Nacional	2013	2018	36	2
14	Matías Fernández	(Chile)	CM / AM / RM	15 May 1986 (aged 30)	(Portugal) Sporting CP	2012	2016	96	7
16	Jakub Błaszczykowski	(Poland)	RW / RM	14 December 1985 (aged 30)	(Germany) Borussia Dortmund	2015	2016	15	2
20	Borja Valero	(Spain)	DM / CM / AM	12 January 1985 (aged 31)	(Spain) Villarreal	2012	2019	134	13
26	Panagiotis Kone	(Greece)	CM / AM	26 July 1987 (aged 28)	(Italy) Udinese	2016	2016	1	0
72	Josip Iličić	(Slovenia)	AM / RW / SS	29 January 1988 (aged 28)	(Italy) Palermo	2013	2018	76	24
Forwards
7	Mauro Zárate	(Argentina)	SS / AM	18 March 1987 (aged 29)	(England) West Ham United	2016	2018	15	3
9	Nikola Kalinić	(Croatia)	CF / ST	5 January 1988 (aged 28)	(Ukraine) Dnipro Dnipropetrovsk	2015	2019	36	12
10	Federico Bernardeschi	(Italy)	RW / LW / SS	16 February 1994 (aged 22)	(Italy) Youth Sector	2011	2019	40	3
27	Cristian Tello	(Spain)	LW / RW	11 August 1991 (aged 24)	(Portugal) Porto	2016	2016	15	2
30	Khouma Babacar	(Senegal)	CF / ST	17 March 1993 (aged 23)	(Italy) Youth Sector	2009	2019	61	13
Players transferred during the season
3	Gilberto	(Brazil)	RB	7 March 1993 (aged 23)	(Brazil) Botafogo	2015	2019	5	0
11	Ante Rebić	(Croatia)	ST / LW	September 21, 1993 (aged 22)	(Croatia) RNK Split	2013	2018	8	2
18	Mario Suárez	(Spain)	DM / CM	24 February 1987 (aged 29)	(Spain) Atlético Madrid	2015	2016	9	1
21	Joan Verdú	(Spain)	CM / AM	5 May 1983 (aged 33)	(United Arab Emirates) Baniyas	2015	2016	5	1
22	Giuseppe Rossi	(Italy)	ST / SS	February 1, 1987 (aged 27)	(Spain) Villarreal	2013	2017	33	16

== Transfers ==
=== In ===
Date	Pos.	Player	Age	Moving from	Fee	Notes	Source
22 July 2015	DF	(Brazil) Gilberto	22	(Brazil) Botafogo	£1.4M		
22 July 2015	MF	(Spain) Mario Suárez	28	(Spain) Atlético Madrid	£10.5M		
14 August 2015	FW	(Croatia) Nikola Kalinić	27	(Ukraine) Dnipro Dnipropetrovsk	£4.2M		
24 August 2015	FW	(Uruguay) Jaime Báez	20	(Uruguay) Juventud	£1.6M		
21 January 2016	FW	(Argentina) Mauro Zárate	28	(England) West Ham United	£1.6M		

==== Loans in ====
Date	Pos.	Player	Age	Moving from	Fee	Notes	Source
15 July 2015	GK	(Italy) Luigi Sepe	24	(Italy) Napoli	Loan		
4 August 2015	DF	(Italy) Davide Astori	28	(Italy) Cagliari	£1M	Loan with an option to buy for £2.4M	
31 August 2015	MF	(Poland) Jakub Błaszczykowski	29	(Germany) Borussia Dortmund	£0.7M		
21 January 2016	MF	(Argentina) Tino Costa	31	(Russia) Spartak Moscow	Loan	Loan with an option to buy	

=== Out ===
Date	Pos.	Player	Age	Moving to	Fee	Notes	Source
20 July 2015	DF	(Montenegro) Stefan Savić	24	(Spain) Atlético Madrid	£17.5M		
9 July 2015	DF	(Italy) Cristiano Piccini	22	(Spain) Real Betis	£1M		
12 August 2015	MF	(Peru) Juan Manuel Vargas	31	(Spain) Real Betis	Free		
22 July 2015	MF	(Chile) David Pizarro	35	(Chile) Santiago Wanderers	Free		
6 August 2015	MF	(Italy) Alberto Aquilani	31	(Portugal) Sporting CP	Free		
20 July 2015	MF	(Italy) Andrea Lazzari	30	(Italy) Carpi	Free		
3 July 2015	GK	(Brazil) Neto	25	(Italy) Juventus	Free		
24 July 2015	DF	(Italy) Michele Camporese	23	(Italy) Empoli	Undisclosed		
31 August 2015	MF	(Spain) Joaquín	34	(Spain) Real Betis	£1M		

==== Loans out ====
Date	Pos.	Player	Age	Moving from	Fee	Notes	Source
30 July 2015	FW	(Germany) Mario Gómez	30	(Turkey) Beşiktaş	Undisclosed	On loan until the end of the season	
31 August 2015	DF	(Argentina) José María Basanta	31	(Mexico) Monterrey	Undisclosed	On loan until the end of the season	

== Pre-season and friendlies ==
=== International Champions Cup ===
21 July 2015 1	Paris Saint-Germain (France)	4–2	(Italy) Fiorentina	Harrison, New Jersey
20:30 EDT (UTC-04:00)	Matuidi 35'; Augustin 41', 75'; Ibrahimović 69'	Report	Joaquín 60'; Rossi 79' (pen.)	Stadium: Red Bull Arena; Attendance: 16,104; Referee: Jose Carlos Rivero (United States)

24 July 2015 2	Benfica (Portugal)	0–0 (4–5 p)	(Italy) Fiorentina	East Hartford, Connecticut
20:00 EDT (UTC−04:00)		Report		Stadium: Rentschler Field; Attendance: 15,791; Referee: Solin Stoica (United States)
	Penalties
	Almeida (penalty scored); Pizzo (penalty scored); Sílvio (penalty scored); Oliveira (penalty scored); Carcela (penalty missed)		(penalty scored) Pasqual; (penalty scored) Badelj; (penalty scored) Iličić; (penalty scored) Rebić; (penalty scored) Suárez

2 August 2015 3	Fiorentina (Italy)	2–1	(Spain) Barcelona	Florence, Italy
21:00 CEST (UTC+02:00)	Bernardeschi 5', 12'	Report	Suárez 17'	Stadium: Stadio Artemio Franchi; Referee: Massimiliano Irrati

5 August 2015 4	Chelsea (England)	0–1	(Italy) Fiorentina	London, England
20:00 BST		Report	Gonzalo 34'	Stadium: Stamford Bridge; Attendance: 41,435; Referee: David Coote

== Competitions ==
=== Overall ===
Competition	Started round	Current position	Final position	First match	Last match
Serie A	Matchday 1	—	5th	23 August 2015	15 May 2016
Coppa Italia	Round of 16	—	Round of 16	16 December 2015	
Europa League	Group stage	—	Round of 32	17 September 2015	25 February 2016

Last updated: 15 May 2016

=== Serie A ===
==== League table ====
Pos	Team	Pld	W	D	L	GF	GA	GD	Pts	Qualification or relegation
3	Roma	38	23	11	4	83	41	+42	80	Qualification to Champions League play-off round
4	Internazionale	38	20	7	11	50	38	+12	67	Qualification to Europa League group stage (Note: Since the winners of the 2015–16 Coppa Italia, Juventus, qualified for European competition based on league position, the spot awarded to the cup winners (Europa League group stage) was passed to fifth-placed team and the spot awarded to the fifth-placed team (Europa League third qualifying round) was passed to the sixth-placed team.)
5	Fiorentina	38	18	10	10	60	42	+18	64	Qualification to Europa League group stage
6	Sassuolo	38	16	13	9	49	40	+9	61	Qualification to Europa League third qualifying round
7	Milan	38	15	12	11	49	43	+6	57	

Source: Serie A, Soccerway
Rules for classification: 1) Points; 2) Head-to-head points; 3) Head-to-head goal difference; 4) Goal difference; 5) Goals scored; 6) Draw.

==== Results summary ====
Overall								Home						Away					
Pld	W	D	L	GF	GA	GD	Pts	W	D	L	GF	GA	GD	W	D	L	GF	GA	GD
38	18	10	10	60	42	+18	64	11	5	3	34	16	+18	7	5	7	26	26	0

Last updated: 15 May 2016.
Source: Competitive matches

==== Results by round ====
Round	1	2	3	4	5	6	7	8	9	10	11	12	13	14	15	16	17	18	19	20	21	22	23	24	25	26	27	28	29	30	31	32	33	34	35	36	37	38
Ground	H	A	H	A	H	A	H	A	H	A	H	A	H	A	H	A	H	A	H	A	H	A	H	A	H	A	H	A	H	A	H	A	H	A	H	A	H	A
Result	W	L	W	W	W	W	W	L	L	W	W	W	D	D	W	L	W	W	L	L	W	D	W	D	W	W	D	L	D	D	D	L	W	L	L	D	D	W
Position	3	10	8	3	2	1	1	1	3	3	1	1	3	3	2	3	3	3	4	4	3	3	3	3	3	3	4	4	4	4	4	5	5	5	5	5	5	5

Updated to match(es) played on 15 May 2016. Source: Competitive matches
A = Away; H = Home; W = Win; D = Draw; L = Loss

==== Matches ====
23 August 2015 1	Fiorentina	2–0	Milan	Florence
20:45 CEST (UTC+02:00)	Roncaglia (yellow card) 31'; Alonso 38'; Iličić (yellow card) 45', (goal) 56' (pen.); Bernardeschi (yellow card) 59'	Report	Ely (yellow card) 9' (yellow-red card) 36'; Bonaventura (yellow card) 36'; Romagnoli (yellow card) 55'	Stadium: Stadio Artemio Franchi; Attendance: 33,904; Referee: Paolo Valeri

30 August 2015 2	Torino	3–1	Fiorentina	Turin
20:45 CEST (UTC+02:00)	Vives (yellow card) 44'; López (yellow card) 64'; Moretti 68'; Quagliarella 69'; Baselli 77'	Report	Alonso 10', (yellow card) 10'; Gonzalo (yellow card) 30'; Fernández (yellow card) 34'	Stadium: Stadio Olimpico di Torino; Attendance: 20,482; Referee: Paolo Tagliavento

12 September 2015 3	Fiorentina	1–0	Genoa	Florence
18:00 CEST (UTC+02:00)	Vecino (yellow card) 20'; Badelj (yellow card) 33' (yellow-red card) 64'; Tomović (yellow card) 48'; Babacar 60'	Report	Capel (yellow card) 12'; Rincón (yellow card) 36'; Ntcham (yellow card) 54'; Costa (yellow card) 55'	Stadium: Stadio Artemio Franchi; Attendance: 30,048; Referee: Daniele Doveri

20 September 2015 4	Carpi	0–1	Fiorentina	Modena
18:00 CEST (UTC+02:00)	Lollo (yellow card) 17'; Fedele (yellow card) 44'; Cofie (yellow card) 48'	Report	Babacar 35'; Pasqual (yellow card) 41'; Alonso (yellow card) 63'; Tătărușanu (yellow card) 68'; Suárez (yellow card) 69'	Stadium: Stadio Alberto Braglia; Attendance: 7,981; Referee: Marco Di Bello

23 September 2015 5	Fiorentina	2–0	Bologna	Florence
20:45 CEST (UTC+02:00)	Błaszczykowski 71'; Rebić (yellow card) 76'; Kalinić 82'	Report	Diawara (yellow card) 43'; Masina (yellow card) 70'	Stadium: Stadio Artemio Franchi; Attendance: 25,085; Referee: Gianpaolo Calvarese

27 September 2015 6	Internazionale	1–4	Fiorentina	Milan
20:45 CEST (UTC+02:00)	Handanović (yellow card) 3'; Miranda (red card) 31'; Kondogbia (yellow card) 40'; Guarín (yellow card) 43'; Icardi 60'; Medel (yellow card) 81'	Report	Iličić 4' (pen.); Kalinić 18', 23', 76', (yellow card) 69'; Alonso (yellow card) 90'	Stadium: San Siro; Attendance: 42,687; Referee: Antonio Damato

4 October 2015 7	Fiorentina	3–0	Atalanta	Florence
20:45 CEST (UTC+02:00)	Iličić 6' (pen.); Valero 34'; Verdú 90'	Report	Paletta (red card) 5'; Masiello (yellow card) 22'; Toloi (yellow card) 57'	Stadium: Stadio Artemio Franchi; Attendance: 25,644; Referee: Davide Massa

18 October 2015 8	Napoli	2–1	Fiorentina	Naples
15:00 CEST (UTC+02:00)	Jorginho (yellow card) 29'; Insigne 46'; Koulibaly (yellow card) 63'; Higuaín 75'; El Kaddouri (yellow card) 90+3'	Report	Badelj (yellow card) 25'; Astori (yellow card) 45+1'; Roncaglia (yellow card) 66'; Kalinić 73'; Gonzalo (yellow card) 87'	Stadium: Stadio San Paolo; Attendance: 49,800; Referee: Luca Banti

25 October 2015 9	Fiorentina	1–2	Roma	Florence
18:00 CET (UTC+01:00)	Roncaglia (yellow card) 53'; Bernardeschi (yellow card) 70'; Babacar 90+4'	Report	Salah 7', (yellow card) 87' (yellow-red card) 87'; Džeko (yellow card) 18'; Florenzi (yellow card) 26'; Gervinho 34'; De Rossi (yellow card) 35'; Szczęsny (yellow card) 84'	Stadium: Stadio Artemio Franchi; Attendance: 36,297; Referee: Daniele Orsato

28 October 2015 10	Hellas Verona	0–2	Fiorentina	Verona
20:45 CET (UTC+01:00)	Pisano (yellow card) 16'; Greco (yellow card) 30'; Matuzalém (yellow card) 39'; Juanito (yellow card) 71'; Souprayen (yellow card) 90'	Report	Márquez 25' (o.g.); Valero (yellow card) 38'; Rossi (yellow card) 50'; Kalinić 57'	Stadium: Stadio Marc'Antonio Bentegodi; Attendance: 18,222; Referee: Paolo Valeri

1 November 2015 11	Fiorentina	4–1	Frosinone	Florence
12:30 CET (UTC+01:00)	Rebić 24'; Gonzalo 29'; Babacar 31' (pen.); Suárez 43'	Report	Paganini (yellow card) 28'; Frara 87'	Stadium: Stadio Artemio Franchi; Attendance: 27,466; Referee: Michael Fabbri

8 November 2015 12	Sampdoria	0–2	Fiorentina	Genoa
20:45 CET (UTC+01:00)	Zukanović (yellow card) 9'; Soriano (yellow card) 20'; Éder (yellow card) 83'	Report	Badelj (yellow card) 3'; Vecino (yellow card) 6'; Iličić 10' (pen.); Gonzalo (yellow card) 12'; Kalinić 58'	Stadium: Stadio Luigi Ferraris; Attendance: 22,457; Referee: Carmine Russo

22 November 2015 13	Fiorentina	2–2	Empoli	Florence
15:00 CET (UTC+01:00)	Rebić (yellow card) 24'; Vecino (yellow card) 26'; Suárez (yellow card) 30'; Kalinić 56', 61'; Bernardeschi (yellow card) 62'; Tomović (yellow card) 71'	Report	Büchel (yellow card) 14', (goal) 27'; Livaja 18', (yellow card) 71'; Zieliński (yellow card) 83'	Stadium: Stadio Artemio Franchi; Attendance: 27,618; Referee: Luca Banti

30 November 2015 14	Sassuolo	1–1	Fiorentina	Reggio Emilia
19:00 CET (UTC+01:00)	Floccari 42', (yellow card) 53'; Vrsaljko (yellow card) 56'	Report	Valero 5'; Badelj (yellow card) 66'	Stadium: Mapei Stadium – Città del Tricolore; Attendance: 13,633; Referee: Davide Massa

6 December 2015 15	Fiorentina	3–0	Udinese	Florence
15:00 CET (UTC+01:00)	Badelj 27'; Gonzalo (yellow card) 29', (goal) 86'; Iličić 62' (pen.); Gilberto (yellow card) 84'	Report	Iturra (yellow card) 35'; Felipe (yellow card) 56'; Badu (yellow card) 62'; Danilo (yellow card) 70'; Edenílson (yellow card) 79'	Stadium: Stadio Artemio Franchi; Attendance: 27,021; Referee: Marco Guida

13 December 2015 16	Juventus	3–1	Fiorentina	Turin
20:45 CET (UTC+01:00)	Cuadrado 6'; Pogba (yellow card) 52'; Mandžukić (yellow card) 72', (goal) 80'; Marchisio (yellow card) 75'; Dybala 90+1'	Report	Iličić 3' (pen.), (yellow card) 68'; Alonso (yellow card) 34'; Valero (yellow card) 57'; Vecino (yellow card) 72'; Pasqual (yellow card) 90+1'	Stadium: Juventus Stadium; Attendance: 38,044; Referee: Daniele Orsato

20 December 2015 17	Fiorentina	2–0	Chievo	Florence
15:00 CET (UTC+01:00)	Kalinić 20'; Iličić 32'; Bernardeschi (yellow card) 70'	Report	Gamberini (yellow card) 71'; Inglese (yellow card) 90+4'	Stadium: Stadio Artemio Franchi; Attendance: 25,156; Referee: Paolo Tagliavento

6 January 2016 18	Palermo	1–3	Fiorentina	Palermo
15:00 CET (UTC+01:00)	Struna (yellow card) 22'; Gilardino 77'; Morganella (yellow card) 79'; Brugman (yellow card) 81'	Report	Iličić 13', 43'; Bernardeschi (yellow card) 34'; Badelj (yellow card) 73'; Valero (yellow card) 89'; Błaszczykowski 90+3'	Stadium: Stadio Renzo Barbera; Attendance: 13,928; Referee: Antonio Damato

9 January 2016 19	Fiorentina	1–3	Lazio	Florence
18:00 CET (UTC+01:00)	Gonzalo (yellow card) 19'; Valero (yellow card) 42'; Roncaglia 90+4'; Pasqual (yellow card) 90+4'	Report	Maurício (yellow card) 23'; Keita 45+1'; Parolo (yellow card) 49'; Hoedt (yellow card) 69'; Konko (yellow card) 74'; Milinković-Savić 90+2'; Felipe Anderson 90+6'	Stadium: Stadio Artemio Franchi; Attendance: 25,361; Referee: Nicola Rizzoli

17 January 2016 20	Milan	2–0	Fiorentina	Milan
20:45 CET (UTC+01:00)	Bacca 4', (yellow card) 68'; Bertolacci (yellow card) 73'; Boateng 88'	Report	Suárez (yellow card) 31'; Kalinić (yellow card) 45'; Vecino (yellow card) 59'; Tomović (yellow card) 67'	Stadium: San Siro; Attendance: 28,374; Referee: Daniele Doveri

24 January 2016 21	Fiorentina	2–0	Torino	Florence
12:30 CET (UTC+01:00)	Iličić 24'; Roncaglia (yellow card) 75'; Gonzalo 83'	Report	Zappacosta (yellow card) 56'; Glik (yellow card) 60'; Vives (yellow card) 61'; Maksimović (yellow card) 79'	Stadium: Stadio Artemio Franchi; Attendance: 26,392; Referee: Paolo Mazzoleni

31 January 2016 22	Genoa	0–0	Fiorentina	Genoa
15:00 CET (UTC+01:00)	Ansaldi (yellow card) 7'; Pavoletti (yellow card) 44'	Report	Roncaglia (yellow card) 32'; Vecino (yellow card) 38'; Costa (yellow card) 82'	Stadium: Stadio Luigi Ferraris; Attendance: 20,832; Referee: Piero Giacomelli

3 February 2016 23	Fiorentina	2–1	Carpi	Florence
15:00 CET (UTC+01:00)	Valero 2'; Błaszczykowski (yellow card) 38'; Vecino (yellow card) 58'; Tătărușanu (yellow card) 61'; Kalinić (yellow card) 82'; Babacar (yellow card) 90+2'; Zárate 90+3'	Report	Suagher (yellow card) 42'; Gagliolo (yellow card) 45'; Lasagna 73'; Lollo (yellow card) 79'	Stadium: Stadio Artemio Franchi; Attendance: 22,791; Referee: Angelo Cervellera

6 February 2016 24	Bologna	1–1	Fiorentina	Bologna
18:00 CET (UTC+01:00)	Giaccherini 63', (yellow card) 65'; Diawara (yellow card) 64'	Report	Fernández (yellow card) 48' (yellow-red card) 57'; Bernardeschi 59'; Astori (yellow card) 65'; Roncaglia (yellow card) 69'	Stadium: Stadio Renato Dall'Ara; Attendance: 19,591; Referee: Luca Banti

14 February 2016 25	Fiorentina	2–1	Internazionale	Florence
20:45 CET (UTC+01:00)	Alonso (yellow card) 47'; Valero 60'; Kalinić (yellow card) 75'; Babacar 90+1'; Zárate (red card) 90+5'	Report	Telles (yellow card) 11' (yellow-red card) 82'; Medel (yellow card) 11'; Brozović 26', (yellow card) 68'; Icardi (yellow card) 28'; Palacio (yellow card) 76'; Kondogbia (red card) 90+6'	Stadium: Stadio Artemio Franchi; Attendance: 30,486; Referee: Paolo Mazzoleni

21 February 2016 26	Atalanta	2–3	Fiorentina	Bergamo
15:00 CET (UTC+01:00)	Pinilla (yellow card) 14', (goal) 90+1'; Dramé (yellow card) 16'; Cigarini (yellow card) 44'; Conti (yellow card) 65' (yellow-red card) 90+2', (goal) 84'	Report	Babacar (yellow card) 15'; Pasqual (yellow card) 45+1'; Fernández 67'; Tello 81'; Kalinić 87'	Stadium: Stadio Atleti Azzurri d'Italia; Attendance: 15,415; Referee: Domenico Celi

29 February 2016 27	Fiorentina	1–1	Napoli	Florence
21:00 CET (UTC+01:00)	Alonso 6'	Report	Higuaín 7'; Albiol (yellow card) 53'	Stadium: Stadio Artemio Franchi; Attendance: 31,469; Referee: Paolo Tagliavento

4 March 2016 28	Roma	4–1	Fiorentina	Rome
20:45 CET (UTC+01:00)	El Shaarawy 22'; Salah 25', 58', (yellow card) 42'; Perotti 38'; Pjanić (yellow card) 44'; Nainggolan (yellow card) 90+1'	Report	Badelj (yellow card) 40'; Iličić 45+3' (pen.); Bernardeschi (yellow card) 80'; Costa (yellow card) 90'	Stadium: Stadio Olimpico; Attendance: 36,263; Referee: Massimiliano Irrati

13 March 2016 29	Fiorentina	1–1	Hellas Verona	Florence
15:00 CET (UTC+01:00)	Zárate 40'; Astori (yellow card) 47'; Fernández (yellow card) 88'	Report	Helander (yellow card) 13'; Pisano 86'	Stadium: Stadio Artemio Franchi; Attendance: 33,081; Referee: Claudio Gavillucci

20 March 2016 30	Frosinone	0–0	Fiorentina	Frosinone
15:00 CET (UTC+01:00)	Ajeti (yellow card) 25'; Gori (yellow card) 35'; Kragl (yellow card) 82'; Sammarco (yellow card) 88'	Report	Alonso (yellow card) 31'; Roncaglia (yellow card) 36'; Astori (yellow card) 49'; Kalinić (yellow card) 81'	Stadium: Stadio Matusa; Attendance: 7,489; Referee: Paolo Valeri

3 April 2016 31	Fiorentina	1–1	Sampdoria	Florence
15:00 CEST (UTC+02:00)	Iličić 24'; Gonzalo (yellow card) 49'	Report	Álvarez 39'; Cassani (yellow card) 42'; Krstičić (yellow card) 53'; Correa (yellow card) 58' (yellow-red card) 72'	Stadium: Stadio Artemio Franchi; Attendance: 28,803; Referee: Andrea Gervasoni

10 April 2016 32	Empoli	2–0	Fiorentina	Empoli
12:30 CEST (UTC+02:00)	Ćosić (yellow card) 23'; Pucciarelli 41'; Büchel (yellow card) 75'; Zieliński 88', (yellow card) 89'	Report	Roncaglia (yellow card) 24'; Vecino (yellow card) 33'; Alonso (yellow card) 61'; Astori (yellow card) 84'	Stadium: Stadio Carlo Castellani; Attendance: 9,651; Referee: Antonio Damato

17 April 2016 33	Fiorentina	3–1	Sassuolo	Florence
15:00 CEST (UTC+02:00)	Gonzalo 10'; Iličić 57'; Tello (yellow card) 59'; Consigli 83' (o.g.)	Report	Vrsaljko (yellow card) 35'; Peluso (yellow card) 45'; Berardi 55', (yellow card) 86'	Stadium: Stadio Artemio Franchi; Attendance: 27,585; Referee: Luca Banti

20 April 2016 34	Udinese	2–1	Fiorentina	Udine
20:45 CEST (UTC+02:00)	Zapata 2'; Ali Adnan (yellow card) 40'; Théréau 53'; Fernandes (yellow card) 76'	Report	Tomović (yellow card) 10'; Zárate 23'; Badelj (yellow card) 34'; Roncaglia (yellow card) 50'; Alonso (yellow card) 87'	Stadium: Stadio Friuli; Attendance: 18,483; Referee: Davide Massa

24 April 2016 35	Fiorentina	1–2	Juventus	Florence
20:45 CEST (UTC+02:00)	Gonzalo (yellow card) 58'; Kalinić 81'	Report	Mandžukić 39'; Rugani (yellow card) 72'; Morata 83', (yellow card) 83'; Cuadrado (yellow card) 90'	Stadium: Stadio Artemio Franchi; Attendance: 33,650; Referee: Paolo Tagliavento

30 April 2016 36	Chievo	0–0	Fiorentina	Verona
20:45 CEST (UTC+02:00)	Gobbi (yellow card) 18'; Cacciatore (yellow card) 37'; Cesar (yellow card) 75'; Pellissier (yellow card) 78'	Report	Zárate (yellow card) 17'; Badelj (yellow card) 57'; Tomović (yellow card) 74'; Fernández (yellow card) 75'	Stadium: Stadio Marc'Antonio Bentegodi; Attendance: 9,000; Referee: Marco Guida

8 May 2016 37	Fiorentina	0–0	Palermo	Florence
15:00 CEST (UTC+02:00)	Pasqual (yellow card) 44'; Zárate (yellow card) 67'; Valero (yellow card) 88'	Report	González (yellow card) 18'; Trajkovski (yellow card) 50'; Morganella (yellow card) 59'; Cionek (yellow card) 69'	Stadium: Stadio Artemio Franchi; Attendance: 28,090; Referee: Daniele Orsato

15 May 2016 38	Lazio	2–4	Fiorentina	Rome
15:00 CEST (UTC+02:00)	Lulić 2'; Klose 74' (pen.)	Report	Vecino 31', 70'; Bernardeschi 40'; Tello 45'; Costa (yellow card) 89'	Stadium: Stadio Olimpico; Attendance: 31,108; Referee: Gianluca Manganiello

=== Coppa Italia ===
16 December 2015 Round of 16	Fiorentina	0–1	Carpi	Florence
16:30 CET (UTC+01:00)	Badelj (yellow card) 4'; Tomović (yellow card) 22'; Gonzalo (yellow card) 53' (yellow-red card) 90+5'	Report	Gabriel Silva (yellow card) 42'; Marrone (yellow card) 45+1'; Matos (yellow card) 67'; Di Gaudio 76'; Mbakogu (yellow card) 90+2' (yellow-red card) 90+4'	Stadium: Stadio Artemio Franchi; Attendance: 8,257; Referee: Andrea Gervasoni

=== UEFA Europa League ===
==== Group stage ====
Pos	Team	Pld	W	D	L	GF	GA	GD	Pts	Qualification	BSL	FIO	LCH	BEL
1	(Switzerland) Basel	6	4	1	1	10	5	+5	13	Advance to knockout phase	—	2–2	2–0	1–2
2	(Italy) Fiorentina	6	3	1	2	11	6	+5	10	Advance to knockout phase	1–2	—	1–2	1–0
3	(Poland) Lech Poznań	6	1	2	3	2	6	−4	5		0–1	0–2	—	0–0
4	(Portugal) Belenenses	6	1	2	3	2	8	−6	5		0–2	0–4	0–0	—

Source: Soccerway
Rules for classification: Group stage tiebreakers

17 September 2015 1	Fiorentina (Italy)	1–2	(Switzerland) Basel	Florence, Italy
21:05 CEST (UTC+02:00)	Kalinić 4'; Roncaglia (yellow card) 35'; Gonzalo (red card) 66'	Report	Xhaka (yellow card) 34'; Suchý (yellow card) 57'; Bjarnason 71'; Elneny 79'; Janko (yellow card) 83'	Stadium: Stadio Artemio Franchi; Attendance: 15,212; Referee: Michael Oliver (England)

1 October 2015 2	Belenenses (Portugal)	0–4	(Italy) Fiorentina	Lisbon, Portugal
19:00 CEST (UTC+02:00)	Kuca (yellow card) 42'; Pinto (yellow card) 80'	Report	Bernardeschi 18'; Babacar 45+1'; Rebić (yellow card) 69'; Badelj (yellow card) 74'; Tonel 83' (o.g.); Rossi 90'	Stadium: Estádio do Restelo; Attendance: 6,886; Referee: Aleksandar Stavrev (Macedonia)

22 October 2015 3	Fiorentina (Italy)	1–2	(Poland) Lech Poznań	Florence, Italy
19:00 CEST (UTC+02:00)	Rossi 90'; Rebić (red card) 90+2'	Report	Kownacki 65'; Lovrencsics (yellow card) 71'; Gajos 82'; Trałka (yellow card) 90+2'	Stadium: Stadio Artemio Franchi; Attendance: 13,792; Referee: Gediminas Mažeika (Lithuania)

5 November 2015 4	Lech Poznań (Poland)	0–2	(Italy) Fiorentina	Poznań, Poland
21:05 CET (UTC+01:00)	Linetty (yellow card) 26'	Report	Iličić 42', 83'	Stadium: Stadion Miejski; Attendance: 22,343; Referee: Halis Özkahya (Turkey)

26 November 2015 5	Basel (Switzerland)	2–2	(Italy) Fiorentina	Basel, Switzerland
19:00 CET (UTC+01:00)	Safari (yellow card) 23'; Bjarnason (yellow card) 26'; Suchý 40', (yellow card) 65'; Janko (yellow card) 45+1'; Elneny 74'; Zuffi (yellow card) 78'	Report	Bernardeschi 23', 36'; Roncaglia (red card) 26'; Gonzalo (yellow card) 45+1'; Badelj (yellow card) 45+3'; Valero (yellow card) 75'	Stadium: St. Jakob-Park; Attendance: 22,550; Referee: Ivan Kružliak (Slovakia)

10 December 2015 6	Fiorentina (Italy)	1–0	(Portugal) Belenenses	Florence, Italy
21:05 CET (UTC+01:00)	Babacar 67'; Rossi (yellow card) 70'	Report	João Afonso (yellow card) 65'; Fábio Sturgeon (yellow card) 69'; Ricardo Dias (yellow card) 90+3'	Stadium: Stadio Artemio Franchi; Attendance: 12,756; Referee: Vladislav Bezborodov (Russia)

==== Knockout phase ====
===== Round of 32 =====
18 February 2016 First leg	Fiorentina (Italy)	1–1	(England) Tottenham Hotspur	Florence, Italy
19:00 CET (UTC+01:00)	Astori (yellow card) 20'; Bernardeschi 59'	Report	Alli (yellow card) 30'; Chadli 37' (pen.); Davies (yellow card) 48'; Dembélé (yellow card) 67'; Kane (yellow card) 90+3'	Stadium: Stadio Artemio Franchi; Attendance: 15,200; Referee: Felix Zwayer (Germany)

25 February 2016 Second leg	Tottenham Hotspur (England)	3–0 (4–1 agg.)	(Italy) Fiorentina	London, England
21:05 CET (UTC+01:00)	Wimmer (yellow card) 17'; Mason 25'; Trippier (yellow card) 38'; Lamela 63'; Alli (yellow card) 78'; Gonzalo 81' (o.g.); Davies (yellow card) 90'	Report	Tomović (yellow card) 45+1'; Alonso (yellow card) 61'	Stadium: White Hart Lane; Attendance: 34,880; Referee: Ovidiu Hațegan (Romania)

== Statistics ==
=== Appearances and goals ===
No.	Pos	Nat	Player	Total		Serie A		Coppa Italia		Europa League	
No.	Pos	Nat	Player	Apps	Goals	Apps	Goals	Apps	Goals	Apps	Goals
Goalkeepers
12	GK	(Romania) ROU	Ciprian Tătărușanu	39	0	37	0	0	0	2	0
24	GK	(Italy) ITA	Luca Lezzerini	2	0	1+1	0	0	0	0	0
33	GK	(Italy) ITA	Luigi Sepe	7	0	0	0	1	0	6	0
Defenders
2	DF	(Argentina) ARG	Gonzalo Rodríguez	41	4	35	4	1	0	5	0
4	DF	(Serbia) SRB	Nenad Tomović	33	0	19+5	0	1	0	6+2	0
13	DF	(Italy) ITA	Davide Astori	42	0	32+1	0	1	0	8	0
23	DF	(Italy) ITA	Manuel Pasqual	20	0	12+4	0	1	0	2+1	0
25	DF	(Tunisia) TUN	Yohan Benalouane	0	0	0	0	0	0	0	0
28	DF	(Spain) ESP	Marcos Alonso	39	3	26+5	3	0+1	0	6+1	0
32	DF	(Argentina) ARG	Facundo Roncaglia	33	1	26+4	1	0	0	3	0
Midfielders
5	MF	(Croatia) CRO	Milan Badelj	35	1	25+2	1	1	0	4+3	0
6	MF	(Argentina) ARG	Tino Costa	8	0	3+4	0	0	0	1	0
8	MF	(Uruguay) URU	Matías Vecino	38	2	27+3	2	1	0	4+3	0
14	MF	(Chile) CHI	Matías Fernández	27	1	11+11	1	0	0	4+1	0
16	MF	(Poland) POL	Jakub Błaszczykowski	20	2	9+6	2	0	0	3+2	0
20	MF	(Spain) ESP	Borja Valero	42	4	35+2	4	0	0	5	0
26	MF	(Greece) GRE	Panagiotis Kone	1	0	0+1	0	0	0	0	0
72	MF	(Slovenia) SLO	Josip Iličić	37	15	24+6	13	0+1	0	5+1	2
Forwards
7	FW	(Argentina) ARG	Mauro Zárate	17	3	6+9	3	0	0	1+1	0
9	FW	(Croatia) CRO	Nikola Kalinić	42	13	25+11	12	1	0	3+2	1
10	FW	(Italy) ITA	Federico Bernardeschi	41	6	25+8	2	1	0	5+2	4
27	FW	(Spain) ESP	Cristian Tello	15	2	13+2	2	0	0	0	0
30	FW	(Senegal) SEN	Khouma Babacar	24	7	11+7	5	1	0	3+2	2
Players transferred out during the season
3	DF	(Brazil) BRA	Gilberto	7	0	3+2	0	0	0	1+1	0
11	FW	(Croatia) CRO	Ante Rebić	7	1	3+1	1	1	0	2	0
18	MF	(Spain) ESP	Mario Suárez	13	1	5+4	1	0	0	3+1	0
21	MF	(Spain) ESP	Joan Verdú	8	1	1+4	1	0	0	2+1	0
22	FW	(Italy) ITA	Giuseppe Rossi	16	2	4+7	0	0+1	0	4	2

Last updated: 15 May 2016
Source: Competitions

=== Goalscorers ===
Rank	No.	Pos	Nat	Name	Serie A	Coppa Italia	UEFA EL	Total
1	72	MF	(Slovenia)	Josip Iličić	13	0	2	15
2	9	FW	(Croatia)	Nikola Kalinić	12	0	1	13
3	30	FW	(Senegal)	Khouma Babacar	5	0	2	7
4	10	FW	(Italy)	Federico Bernardeschi	2	0	4	6
5	2	DF	(Argentina)	Gonzalo Rodríguez	4	0	0	4
5	20	MF	(Spain)	Borja Valero	4	0	0	4
7	7	FW	(Argentina)	Mauro Zárate	3	0	0	3
7	28	DF	(Spain)	Marcos Alonso	3	0	0	3
9	8	MF	(Uruguay)	Matías Vecino	2	0	0	2
9	16	MF	(Poland)	Jakub Błaszczykowski	2	0	0	2
9	22	FW	(Italy)	Giuseppe Rossi	0	0	2	2
9	27	FW	(Spain)	Cristian Tello	2	0	0	2
13	5	MF	(Croatia)	Milan Badelj	1	0	0	1
13	11	FW	(Croatia)	Ante Rebić	1	0	0	1
13	14	MF	(Chile)	Matías Fernández	1	0	0	1
13	18	MF	(Spain)	Mario Suárez	1	0	0	1
13	21	MF	(Spain)	Joan Verdú	1	0	0	1
13	32	DF	(Argentina)	Facundo Roncaglia	1	0	0	1
Own goal					2	0	1	3
Totals					60	0	12	72

Last updated: 15 May 2016

=== Clean sheets ===
Rank	No.	Pos	Nat	Name	Serie A	Coppa Italia	UEFA EL	Total
1	12	GK	(Romania)	Ciprian Tătărușanu	14	0	0	14
2	33	GK	(Italy)	Luigi Sepe	0	0	3	3
Totals					14	0	3	17

Last updated: 15 May 2016

=== Disciplinary record ===
No.	Pos	Nat	Name	Serie A			Coppa Italia			UEFA EL			Total		
No.	Pos	Nat	Name	Booked	(yellow card) (yellow-red card)	Sent off (straight red)	Booked	(yellow card) (yellow-red card)	Sent off (straight red)	Booked	(yellow card) (yellow-red card)	Sent off (straight red)	Booked	(yellow card) (yellow-red card)	Sent off (straight red)
12	GK	(Romania)	Ciprian Tătărușanu	2	0	0	0	0	0	0	0	0	2	0	0
24	GK	(Italy)	Luca Lezzerini	0	0	0	0	0	0	0	0	0	0	0	0
33	GK	(Italy)	Luigi Sepe	0	0	0	0	0	0	0	0	0	0	0	0
2	DF	(Argentina)	Gonzalo Rodríguez	7	0	0	0	1	0	1	0	1	8	1	1
3	DF	(Brazil)	Gilberto	1	0	0	0	0	0	0	0	0	1	0	0
4	DF	(Serbia)	Nenad Tomović	5	0	0	1	0	0	1	0	0	7	0	0
13	DF	(Italy)	Davide Astori	5	0	0	0	0	0	1	0	0	6	0	0
23	DF	(Italy)	Manuel Pasqual	5	0	0	0	0	0	0	0	0	5	0	0
25	DF	(Tunisia)	Yohan Benalouane	0	0	0	0	0	0	0	0	0	0	0	0
28	DF	(Spain)	Marcos Alonso	8	0	0	0	0	0	1	0	0	9	0	0
32	DF	(Argentina)	Facundo Roncaglia	9	0	0	0	0	0	1	0	1	10	0	1
5	MF	(Croatia)	Milan Badelj	7	1	0	1	0	0	2	0	0	10	1	0
6	MF	(Argentina)	Tino Costa	3	0	0	0	0	0	0	0	0	3	0	0
8	MF	(Uruguay)	Matías Vecino	8	0	0	0	0	0	0	0	0	8	0	0
14	MF	(Chile)	Matías Fernández	3	1	0	0	0	0	0	0	0	3	1	0
16	MF	(Poland)	Jakub Błaszczykowski	1	0	0	0	0	0	0	0	0	1	0	0
18	MF	(Spain)	Mario Suárez	3	0	0	0	0	0	0	0	0	3	0	0
20	MF	(Spain)	Borja Valero	5	0	0	0	0	0	1	0	0	6	0	0
72	MF	(Slovenia)	Josip Iličić	2	0	0	0	0	0	0	0	0	2	0	0
7	FW	(Argentina)	Mauro Zárate	2	0	1	0	0	0	0	0	0	2	0	1
9	FW	(Croatia)	Nikola Kalinić	5	0	0	0	0	0	0	0	0	5	0	0
10	FW	(Italy)	Federico Bernardeschi	6	0	0	0	0	0	0	0	0	6	0	0
11	FW	(Croatia)	Ante Rebić	2	0	0	0	0	0	1	0	1	3	0	1
22	FW	(Italy)	Giuseppe Rossi	1	0	0	0	0	0	1	0	0	2	0	0
27	FW	(Spain)	Cristian Tello	1	0	0	0	0	0	0	0	0	1	0	0
30	FW	(Senegal)	Khouma Babacar	2	0	0	0	0	0	0	0	0	2	0	0
Totals				93	2	1	2	1	0	10	0	3	105	3	4

Last updated: 15 May 2016
