= 2018–19 ACF Fiorentina season =

Fiorentina
2018–19 season
- President: Mario Cognigni
- Manager: Stefano Pioli (until 9 April 2019); Vincenzo Montella (from 10 April 2019)
- Stadium: Stadio Artemio Franchi
- Serie A: 16th
- Coppa Italia: Semi-finals
- Top goalscorer: League: Marco Benassi (7); All: Federico Chiesa (12)
- Highest home attendance: 40,872 vs Juventus (1 December 2018, Serie A)
- Lowest home attendance: 21,190 vs Roma (30 January 2019, Coppa Italia)
- Average home league attendance: 31,135
Home colours	Away colours	Third colours

The 2018–19 season was the 92nd season in ACF Fiorentina's history and their 81st in the top-flight of Italian football. Having finished 8th the previous season, Fiorentina competed only in Serie A and in the Coppa Italia.

The season was coach Stefano Pioli's second in charge of the club.

== Players ==
=== Squad information ===
Last updated on 26 May 2019
Appearances include league matches only

No.	Name	Nat	Position(s)	Date of birth (Age at end of season)	Signed from	Signed in	Contract ends	Apps.	Goals
Goalkeepers
1	Alban Lafont	(France)	GK	23 January 1999 (aged 20)	(France) Toulouse	2018	2023	34	0
23	Pietro Terracciano	(Italy)	GK	8 March 1990 (aged 29)	(Italy) Empoli	2019	2019	2	0
Defenders
2	Vincent Laurini	(France)	RB	10 June 1989 (aged 30)	(Italy) Empoli	2017	2020	37	0
3	Cristiano Biraghi	(Italy)	LB	1 September 1992 (aged 26)	(Italy) Pescara	2017	2021	70	2
4	Nikola Milenković	(Serbia)	CB	12 October 1997 (aged 21)	(Serbia) Partizan	2017	2022	50	3
5	Federico Ceccherini	(Italy)	CB	11 May 1992 (aged 27)	(Italy) Crotone	2018	2022	15	0
15	Maximiliano Olivera	(Uruguay)	CB / LB	5 March 1992 (aged 27)	(Uruguay) Peñarol	2016	2021	25	0
16	Dávid Hancko	(Slovakia)	CB	13 December 1997 (aged 21)	(Slovakia) Žilina	2018	2023	5	0
20	Germán Pezzella	(Argentina)	CB	27 June 1991 (aged 28)	(Spain) Real Betis	2017	2022	66	3
31	Vitor Hugo	(Brazil)	CB	20 May 1991 (aged 28)	(Brazil) Palmeiras	2017	2021	49	1
Midfielders
6	Christian Nørgaard	(Denmark)	DM / CM / AM	10 March 1994 (aged 25)	(Denmark) Brøndby	2018	2022	6	0
8	Gerson	(Brazil)	CM / AM	20 May 1997 (aged 22)	(Italy) Roma	2018	2019	36	3
14	Bryan Dabo	(Burkina Faso)	CM	13 February 1992 (aged 27)	(France) Saint-Étienne	2018	2021	33	2
17	Jordan Veretout	(France)	CM	1 March 1993 (aged 26)	(England) Aston Villa	2017	2021	69	13
18	Nicky Beloko	(Switzerland)	CM / RM / LM	16 February 2000 (aged 19)	(Italy) Youth Sector	2019	2021	1	0
19	Cristóbal Montiel	(Spain)	AM / LW	11 April 2000 (aged 19)	(Italy) Youth Sector	2019		1	0
24	Marco Benassi	(Italy)	CM	8 September 1994 (aged 24)	(Italy) Torino	2017	2022	67	12
26	Edimilson Fernandes	(Switzerland)	CM / AM / RM	15 April 1996 (aged 23)	(England) West Ham United	2018	2019	29	2
Forwards
9	Giovanni Simeone	(Argentina)	CF / ST	5 July 1995 (aged 23)	(Italy) Genoa	2017	2022	74	20
10	Marko Pjaca	(Croatia)	LW / RW / CF	6 May 1995 (aged 24)	(Italy) Juventus	2018	2019	19	1
11	Kevin Mirallas	(Belgium)	RW / LW / SS	5 October 1987 (aged 31)	(England) Everton	2018	2019	27	2
25	Federico Chiesa	(Italy)	AM / RW	25 October 1997 (aged 21)	(Italy) Youth Sector	2016	2022	100	15
27	Martin Graiciar	(Czech Republic)	CF / SS	11 April 1999 (aged 20)	(Czech Republic) Slovan Liberec	2017	2022	0	0
28	Dušan Vlahović	(Serbia)	CF	28 January 2000 (aged 19)	(Serbia) Partizan	2018	2023	10	0
29	Luis Muriel	(Colombia)	CF / ST	16 April 1991 (aged 28)	(Spain) Sevilla	2019	2019	19	6
Players transferred during the season
7	Valentin Eysseric	(France)	AM / LW	25 March 1992 (aged 27)	(France) Nice	2017	2021	29	1
21	Riccardo Sottil	(Italy)	LW / RW / SS	3 June 1999 (aged 20)	(Italy) Youth Sector	2018	—	2	0
23	Sebastián Cristóforo	(Uruguay)	CM	23 August 1993 (aged 25)	(Spain) Sevilla	2017	2021	22	0
34	Kevin Diks	(Netherlands)	RB / CB / LB	6 October 1996 (aged 22)	(Netherlands) Vitesse	2016	2021	2	0
69	Bartłomiej Drągowski	(Poland)	GK	19 August 1997 (aged 21)	(Poland) Jagiellonia Białystok	2016	2021	7	0
77	Cyril Théréau	(France)	CF / ST	24 April 1983 (aged 36)	(Italy) Udinese	2017	2020	22	5

== Transfers ==
=== In ===
Date	Pos.	Player	Age	Moving from	Fee	Notes	Source
30 May 2018	DF	(Argentina) Germán Pezzella	26	(Spain) Real Betis	€10M	Option to buy exercised	
14 June 2018	DF	(Slovakia) Dávid Hancko	20	(Slovakia) Žilina	€3.5M		
1 July 2018	FW	(Uruguay) Jaime Báez	23	(Italy) Pescara	Free	Loan return	
1 July 2018	DF	(Netherlands) Kevin Diks	21	(Netherlands) Feyenoord	Free	Loan return	
1 July 2018	FW	(United States) Joshua Pérez	20	(Italy) Livorno	Free	Loan return	
1 July 2018	MF	(Colombia) Carlos Sánchez	32	(Spain) Espanyol	Free	Loan return	
1 July 2018	MF	(Uruguay) Andrés Schetino	24	(Denmark) Esbjerg fB	Free	Loan return	
1 July 2018	FW	(Norway) Rafik Zekhnini	20	(Norway) Rosenborg	Free	Loan return	
1 July 2018	DF	(Italy) Lorenzo Venuti	23	(Italy) Benevento	Free	Loan return	
2 July 2018	GK	(France) Alban Lafont	19	(France) Toulouse	€8.5M		
13 July 2018	DF	(Italy) Federico Ceccherini	26	(Italy) Crotone	Undisclosed		
28 January 2019	MF	(Poland) Szymon Żurkowski	21	(Poland) Górnik Zabrze	€3.7M	Player will remain with current club until the end of the season	

==== Loans in ====
Date	Pos.	Player	Age	Moving from	Fee	Notes	Source
20 July 2018	MF	(Brazil) Gerson	21	(Italy) Roma	Loan		
4 August 2018	FW	(Belgium) Kevin Mirallas	30	(England) Everton	Loan	Loan with an option to buy	
7 August 2018	FW	(Croatia) Marko Pjaca	23	(Italy) Juventus	€2M	€2M loan with a €20M option to buy	
13 August 2018	MF	(Switzerland) Edimilson Fernandes	22	(England) West Ham United	€1M	€1M loan with an €8M option to buy	
2 January 2019	FW	(Colombia) Luis Muriel	27	(Spain) Sevilla	Loan	Loan with an option to buy	

=== Out ===
Date	Pos.	Player	Age	Moving to	Fee	Notes	Source
7 June 2018	DF	(Portugal) Bruno Gaspar	25	(Portugal) Sporting CP	€5M		
15 June 2018	DF	(Serbia) Nenad Tomović	30	(Italy) Chievo	€2.5M	Option to buy exercised	
1 July 2018	MF	(Croatia) Milan Badelj	29	(Italy) Lazio	Free	End of contract	
1 July 2018	MF	(Portugal) Gil Dias	21	(France) Monaco	Free	Loan return	
1 July 2018	FW	(Italy) Simone Lo Faso	20	(Italy) Palermo	Free	Loan return	
1 July 2018	FW	(Italy) Diego Falcinelli	27	(Italy) Sassuolo	Free	Loan return	
1 July 2018	GK	(Italy) Marco Sportiello	26	(Italy) Atalanta	Free	Loan return	
9 August 2018	FW	(United States) Joshua Pérez	20	(United States) Los Angeles FC	Undisclosed		
9 August 2018	MF	(Colombia) Carlos Sánchez	32	(England) West Ham United	€4.45M		

==== Loans out ====
Date	Pos.	Player	Age	Moving to	Fee	Notes	Source
9 August 2018	FW	(Uruguay) Jaime Báez	23	(Italy) Cosenza	Loan		
9 August 2018	MF	(Uruguay) Andrés Schetino	24	(Italy) Cosenza	Loan		
16 August 2018	DF	(Bulgaria) Petko Hristov	19	(Italy) Ternana	Loan		
17 August 2018	MF	(Italy) Riccardo Saponara	26	(Italy) Sampdoria	Loan	Loan with an option to buy	
17 August 2018	DF	(Italy) Lorenzo Venuti	23	(Italy) Lecce	Loan		
25 August 2018	DF	(Italy) Luca Zanon	22	(Italy) Siena	Loan		
31 August 2018	MF	(Uruguay) Sebastián Cristóforo	25	(Spain) Getafe	Loan	Loan with an option to buy	
24 December 2018	DF	(Uruguay) Maximiliano Olivera	26	(Paraguay) Olimpia	Loan		
30 December 2018	DF	(Brazil) Gilberto	25	(Brazil) Fluminense	Loan	12-month loan with an option to buy	
31 January 2019	DF	(Netherlands) Kevin Diks	22	(Italy) Empoli	Loan	18-month loan	
31 January 2019	MF	(France) Valentin Eysseric	26	(France) Nantes	Loan		
31 January 2019	FW	(France) Cyril Théréau	35	(Italy) Cagliari	Loan		

== Pre-season and friendlies ==
11 July 2018 Friendly	Fiorentina	10–0	Val di Fassa Team	Moena, Italy
17:30 CEST (UTC+02:00)	Vitor Hugo 9'; Chiesa 15', 19'; Simeone 17', 35', 41', 43'; Cristóforo 47'; Montiel 62'; Cincielli 89' (o.g.)	Report		Stadium: Campo Sportivo Cesare Benatti

14 July 2018 Friendly	Fiorentina	17–0	US Borgo	Moena, Italy
17:30 CEST (UTC+02:00)	Pezzella 6'; Vitor Hugo 8'; Eysseric 9'; Benassi 16'; Simeone 17', 19', 29'; Dabo 30'; Chiesa 42'; Vlahović 47', 65', 88'; Montiel 52'; Saponara 57'; Hancko 60', 81'; Beloko 74'	Report		Stadium: Campo Sportivo Cesare Benatti

18 July 2018 Friendly	Fiorentina	2–1	Hellas Verona	Moena, Italy
17:30 CEST (UTC+02:00)	Simeone 25'; Chiesa 35'	Report	Cissé 29'	Stadium: Campo Sportivo Cesare Benatti

20 July 2018 Friendly	Fiorentina	11–0	Real Vicenza	Moena, Italy
17:30 CEST (UTC+02:00)	Montiel 14'; Hristov 24'; Vlahović 25', 31', 58'; Meli 32', 65', 85'; Ceccherini 36'; Sottil 43'; Sagaria 88' (o.g.)	Report		Stadium: Campo Sportivo Cesare Benatti

21 July 2018 Friendly	Fiorentina	0–1	Venezia	Moena, Italy
17:30 CEST (UTC+02:00)		Report	Segre 90'	Stadium: Campo Sportivo Cesare Benatti

5 August 2018 Opel Cup	Fiorentina (Italy)	0–0 (3–5 p)	(Spain) Athletic Bilbao	Mainz, Germany
13:00 CEST (UTC+02:00)		Report		Stadium: Opel Arena
	Penalties
	Eysseric (penalty scored); Gerson (penalty scored); Sottil (penalty scored); Graiciar (penalty missed)		(penalty scored) Beñat; (penalty scored) Balenziaga; (penalty scored) Iturraspe; (penalty scored) San José; (penalty scored) Sabin Merino

5 August 2018 Opel Cup	Mainz 05 (Germany)	0–0 (4–5 p)	(Italy) Fiorentina	Mainz, Germany
15:00 CEST (UTC+02:00)		Report		Stadium: Opel Arena

== Competitions ==
=== Serie A ===
==== League table ====
Pos	Team	Pld	W	D	L	GF	GA	GD	Pts	Qualification or relegation
14	Parma	38	10	11	17	41	61	−20	41 (Note: Positions determined by head-to-head points: Parma: 9 pts; Cagliari: 7 pts; Fiorentina: 1 pt.)	
15	Cagliari	38	10	11	17	36	54	−18	41	
16	Fiorentina	38	8	17	13	47	45	+2	41	
17	Genoa	38	8	14	16	39	57	−18	38 (Note: Genoa finished ahead of Empoli on head-to-head points: Genoa 2–1 Empoli, Empoli 1–3 Genoa.)	
18	Empoli (R)	38	10	8	20	51	70	−19	38	Relegation to Serie B

Source: Serie A, Soccerway
Rules for classification: 1) Points; 2) Head-to-head points; 3) Head-to-head goal difference; 4) Goal difference; 5) Goals scored; 6) Draw. (Note: Head-to-head record is used only after all the matches between the teams in question have been played).
(R) Relegated

==== Results summary ====
Overall								Home						Away					
Pld	W	D	L	GF	GA	GD	Pts	W	D	L	GF	GA	GD	W	D	L	GF	GA	GD
38	8	17	13	47	45	+2	41	5	9	5	25	19	+6	3	8	8	22	26	−4

Last updated: 26 May 2019.
Source: Competitive matches

==== Results by round ====
Round	1	2	3	4	5	6	7	8	9	10	11	12	13	14	15	16	17	18	19	20	21	22	23	24	25	26	27	28	29	30	31	32	33	34	35	36	37	38
Ground	A	H	H	A	H	A	H	A	H	A	H	A	A	H	A	H	A	H	A	H	A	A	H	A	H	A	H	A	H	A	H	H	A	H	A	H	A	H
Result	D	W	W	L	W	L	W	L	D	D	D	D	D	L	D	W	W	L	D	D	W	D	D	W	D	L	D	L	D	D	L	D	L	L	L	L	L	D
Position	10	8	3	5	3	5	3	7	6	6	8	9	10	12	12	10	7	10	10	10	9	9	10	9	9	10	10	10	10	10	10	10	10	12	13	14	15	16

Updated to match(es) played on 26 May 2019. Source: Competitive matches
A = Away; H = Home; W = Win; D = Draw; L = Loss

==== Matches ====
26 August 2018 2	Fiorentina	6–1	Chievo	Florence
20:30 CEST (UTC+02:00)	Milenković 8'; Fernandes (yellow card) 39'; Gerson 42'; Benassi 49', 90'; Chiesa 71'; Simeone 90+3'	Report	Depaoli (yellow card) 66'; Tomović 76'; Meggiorini (yellow card) 82'; Radovanović (yellow card) 85'	Stadium: Stadio Artemio Franchi; Attendance: 27,790; Referee: Rosario Abisso

2 September 2018 3	Fiorentina	1–0	Udinese	Florence
18:00 CEST (UTC+02:00)	Gerson (yellow card) 60'; Benassi 73'; Pezzella (yellow card) 86'; Biraghi (yellow card) 89'	Report	Fofana (yellow card) 63'	Stadium: Stadio Artemio Franchi; Attendance: 31,009; Referee: Antonio Giua

15 September 2018 4	Napoli	1–0	Fiorentina	Naples
18:00 CEST (UTC+02:00)	Zieliński (yellow card) 39'; Insigne 79'	Report	Chiesa (yellow card) 34'; Benassi (yellow card) 43'; Dabo (yellow card) 75'; Eysseric (yellow card) 90+3'	Stadium: Stadio San Paolo; Attendance: 20,131; Referee: Michael Fabbri

19 September 2018 1	Sampdoria	1–1	Fiorentina	Genoa
17:00 CEST (UTC+02:00)	Sala (yellow card) 38'; Linetty (yellow card) 51'; Caprari 60'; Tonelli (yellow card) 85'	Report	Simeone 13'; Veretout (yellow card) 72'; Benassi (yellow card) 79'	Stadium: Stadio Luigi Ferraris; Attendance: 18,334; Referee: Fabio Maresca
Note: Match was postponed from its original date of 19 August due to the collapse of the Ponte Morandi bridge in Genoa, which resulted in the deaths of 43 people.

22 September 2018 5	Fiorentina	3–0	SPAL	Florence
20:30 CEST (UTC+02:00)	Pjaca 18'; Milenković 28'; Biraghi (yellow card) 33'; Chiesa 56'	Report	Schiattarella (yellow card) 55'; Kurtić (yellow card) 74'	Stadium: Stadio Artemio Franchi; Attendance: 30,068; Referee: Davide Ghersini

25 September 2018 6	Internazionale	2–1	Fiorentina	Milan
21:00 CEST (UTC+02:00)	Icardi 45' (pen.); Asamoah (yellow card) 72'; D'Ambrosio 77'	Report	Chiesa (yellow card) 19'; Fernandes (yellow card) 45+2'; Škriniar 53' (o.g.); Mirallas (yellow card) 84'	Stadium: San Siro; Attendance: 55,840; Referee: Paolo Mazzoleni

30 September 2018 7	Fiorentina	2–0	Atalanta	Florence
15:00 CEST (UTC+02:00)	Vitor Hugo (yellow card) 52'; Veretout 63' (pen.); Lafont (yellow card) 90'; Fernandes (yellow card) 90+2'; Biraghi 90+4'	Report	Palomino (yellow card) 54'; Toloi (yellow card) 61'; Gómez (yellow card) 86'	Stadium: Stadio Artemio Franchi; Attendance: 30,535; Referee: Paolo Valeri

7 October 2018 8	Lazio	1–0	Fiorentina	Rome
15:00 CEST (UTC+02:00)	Lulić (yellow card) 26'; Caicedo (yellow card) 34'; Immobile 37'; Marušić (yellow card) 52'; Correa (yellow card) 69'; Strakosha (yellow card) 82'	Report	Pjaca (yellow card) 35'; Gerson (yellow card) 45+3'; Vitor Hugo (yellow card) 70'	Stadium: Stadio Olimpico; Attendance: 30,000; Referee: Daniele Orsato

21 October 2018 9	Fiorentina	1–1	Cagliari	Florence
18:00 CEST (UTC+02:00)	Veretout 60' (pen.)	Report	Ioniță (yellow card) 41'; Barella (yellow card) 59'; Pavoletti 69'	Stadium: Stadio Artemio Franchi; Attendance: 31,567; Referee: Piero Giacomelli

27 October 2018 10	Torino	1–1	Fiorentina	Turin
20:30 CEST (UTC+02:00)	Lafont 13' (o.g.); Rincón (yellow card) 25'; Meïté (yellow card) 70'	Report	Benassi 2'; Milenković (yellow card) 6'; Gerson (yellow card) 67'; Mirallas (yellow card) 77'; Veretout (yellow card) 82'	Stadium: Stadio Olimpico Grande Torino; Attendance: 17,871; Referee: Michael Fabbri

3 November 2018 11	Fiorentina	1–1	Roma	Florence
18:00 CET (UTC+01:00)	Veretout 33' (pen.), (yellow card) 77'; Biraghi (yellow card) 67'; Vitor Hugo (yellow card) 90'	Report	Nzonzi (yellow card) 28'; Fazio (yellow card) 37'; Florenzi 85'; Lo. Pellegrini (yellow card) 87'	Stadium: Stadio Artemio Franchi; Attendance: 30,590; Referee: Luca Banti

9 November 2018 12	Frosinone	1–1	Fiorentina	Frosinone
20:30 CET (UTC+01:00)	Zampano (yellow card) 26'; Ariaudo (yellow card) 48'; Maiello (yellow card) 68'; Pinamonti 89'	Report	Benassi 47'	Stadium: Stadio Benito Stirpe; Attendance: 13,378; Referee: Fabrizio Pasqua

25 November 2018 13	Bologna	0–0	Fiorentina	Bologna
15:00 CET (UTC+01:00)	Calabresi (yellow card) 61'; Krejčí (yellow card) 74'; Palacio (yellow card) 87'	Report	Vitor Hugo (yellow card) 47'	Stadium: Stadio Renato Dall'Ara; Attendance: 21,241; Referee: Marco Di Bello

1 December 2018 14	Fiorentina	0–3	Juventus	Florence
18:00 CET (UTC+01:00)	Fernandes (yellow card) 44'; Vitor Hugo (yellow card) 51'; Milenković (yellow card) 64'; Pezzella (yellow card) 71'; Théréau (yellow card) 88'; Veretout (yellow card) 90+1'	Report	Mandžukić (yellow card) 11'; Bentancur 31', (yellow card) 50'; Chiellini 69'; Ronaldo 79' (pen.), (yellow card) 80'	Stadium: Stadio Artemio Franchi; Attendance: 40,872; Referee: Daniele Orsato

9 December 2018 15	Sassuolo	3–3	Fiorentina	Reggio Emilia
12:30 CET (UTC+01:00)	Sensi (yellow card) 47', (goal) 80'; Duncan 62'; Babacar 67'; Berardi (yellow card) 71'; Đuričić (yellow card) 86' (red card) 87'; Matri (yellow card) 90+4'	Report	Fernandes (yellow card) 23'; Milenković (yellow card) 25' (yellow-red card) 90+2'; Benassi (yellow card) 65', (goal) 89'; Simeone 70'; Veretout (yellow card) 90+1'; Mirallas 90+6'	Stadium: Mapei Stadium – Città del Tricolore; Attendance: 11,436; Referee: Daniele Chiffi

16 December 2018 16	Fiorentina	3–1	Empoli	Florence
15:00 CET (UTC+01:00)	Mirallas 40'; Benassi (yellow card) 53'; Simeone 59'; Gerson (yellow card) 65'; Dabo 78'	Report	Krunić 24', (yellow card) 55'	Stadium: Stadio Artemio Franchi; Attendance: 28,918; Referee: Piero Giacomelli

22 December 2018 17	Milan	0–1	Fiorentina	Milan
15:00 CET (UTC+01:00)	Suso (yellow card) 77'; Romagnoli (yellow card) 78'; Laxalt (yellow card) 90+3'	Report	Pezzella (yellow card) 32'; Vitor Hugo (yellow card) 42'; Fernandes (yellow card) 62'; Chiesa 73', (yellow card) 74'	Stadium: San Siro; Attendance: 52,592; Referee: Maurizio Mariani

26 December 2018 18	Fiorentina	0–1	Parma	Florence
15:00 CET (UTC+01:00)	Milenković (yellow card) 13'; Pezzella (yellow card) 31'; Laurini (yellow card) 40'; Vitor Hugo (red card) 65'; Gerson (yellow card) 88'	Report	Rigoni (yellow card) 18'; Inglese 45+2', (yellow card) 89'; Biabiany (yellow card) 74'; Deiola (yellow card) 90+1'	Stadium: Stadio Artemio Franchi; Attendance: 31,767; Referee: Michael Fabbri

29 December 2018 19	Genoa	0–0	Fiorentina	Genoa
15:00 CET (UTC+01:00)	Piątek (yellow card) 75'; Lazović (yellow card) 90+1'	Report	Biraghi (yellow card) 68'	Stadium: Stadio Luigi Ferraris; Attendance: 21,270; Referee: Davide Massa

20 January 2019 20	Fiorentina	3–3	Sampdoria	Florence
15:00 CET (UTC+01:00)	Fernandes (yellow card) 14' (yellow-red card) 39'; Milenković (yellow card) 34'; Muriel 34', 70'; Vitor Hugo (yellow card) 80'; Biraghi (yellow card) 82'; Veretout (yellow card) 90+2'; Pezzella 90+3'	Report	Ramírez (yellow card) 22', (goal) 44'; Jankto (yellow card) 60'; Quagliarella 81' (pen.), 85'; Ekdal (yellow card) 82'; Murru (yellow card) 90+2'	Stadium: Stadio Artemio Franchi; Attendance: 27,844; Referee: Marco Di Bello

27 January 2019 21	Chievo	3–4	Fiorentina	Verona
12:30 CET (UTC+01:00)	Giaccherini (yellow card) 25'; Sorrentino (yellow card) 27'; Stępiński 38'; Rigoni (yellow card) 47'; Pellissier 60' (pen.); Đorđević 89'	Report	Muriel 4'; Benassi (yellow card) 19' (red card) 60', (goal) 26'; Chiesa 79', 86'	Stadium: Stadio Marc'Antonio Bentegodi; Attendance: 10,000; Referee: Daniele Chiffi

3 February 2019 22	Udinese	1–1	Fiorentina	Udine
15:00 CET (UTC+01:00)	Mandragora (yellow card) 43'; Stryger Larsen 56'; Pussetto (yellow card) 74'; Behrami (yellow card) 80'	Report	Milenković (yellow card) 17'; Gerson (yellow card) 59'; Laurini (yellow card) 60'; Fernandes 65'	Stadium: Dacia Arena; Attendance: 18,118; Referee: Daniele Orsato

9 February 2019 23	Fiorentina	0–0	Napoli	Florence
18:00 CET (UTC+01:00)	Dabo (yellow card) 42'; Veretout (yellow card) 50'	Report	Callejón (yellow card) 54'; Zieliński (yellow card) 57'; Ghoulam (yellow card) 72'; Maksimović (yellow card) 90'	Stadium: Stadio Artemio Franchi; Attendance: 29,377; Referee: Gianpaolo Calvarese

17 February 2019 24	SPAL	1–4	Fiorentina	Ferrara
12:30 CET (UTC+01:00)	Petagna 36'; Fares (yellow card) 39'; Cionek (yellow card) 41'; Schiattarella (yellow card) 78'	Report	Fernandes (yellow card) 9', (goal) 44'; Veretout (yellow card) 25', (goal) 79' (pen.); Biraghi (yellow card) 35'; Milenković (yellow card) 55'; Simeone 81'; Gerson 88'	Stadium: Stadio Paolo Mazza; Attendance: 13,669; Referee: Luca Pairetto

24 February 2019 25	Fiorentina	3–3	Internazionale	Florence
20:30 CET (UTC+01:00)	De Vrij 1' (o.g.); Muriel 74'; Lafont (yellow card) 87'; Veretout 90+11' (pen.); Dabo (yellow card) 90+12'	Report	Vecino 6'; Politano 40', (yellow card) 71'; Perišić 52' (pen.); Nainggolan (yellow card) 57'; Škriniar (yellow card) 65'; Brozović (yellow card) 89'	Stadium: Stadio Artemio Franchi; Attendance: 32,824; Referee: Rosario Abisso

3 March 2019 26	Atalanta	3–1	Fiorentina	Bergamo
18:00 CET (UTC+01:00)	Iličić 28'; Gómez 34'; Masiello (yellow card) 35'; Freuler (yellow card) 42'; Gosens 59'; De Roon (yellow card) 69'; Palomino (yellow card) 86'	Report	Muriel 3'; Ceccherini (yellow card) 6'; Veretout (yellow card) 81'	Stadium: Stadio Atleti Azzurri d'Italia; Attendance: 18,796; Referee: Marco Guida

10 March 2019 27	Fiorentina	1–1	Lazio	Florence
20:30 CET (UTC+01:00)	Ceccherini (yellow card) 42'; Veretout (yellow card) 45'; Muriel 61'; Simeone (yellow card) 90+1'	Report	Immobile 23', (yellow card) 52'	Stadium: Stadio Artemio Franchi; Attendance: 28,727; Referee: Daniele Orsato

15 March 2019 28	Cagliari	2–1	Fiorentina	Cagliari
20:30 CET (UTC+01:00)	Cigarini (yellow card) 34'; Ceppitelli (yellow card) 44', (goal) 66'; João Pedro 52'; Pavoletti (yellow card) 76'	Report	Chiesa (yellow card) 42', (goal) 88'; Pezzella (yellow card) 90+3'	Stadium: Sardegna Arena; Attendance: 14,735; Referee: Daniele Doveri

31 March 2019 29	Fiorentina	1–1	Torino	Florence
15:00 CEST (UTC+02:00)	Simeone 7'	Report	Baselli 34', (yellow card) 44'; Zaza (yellow card) 85'	Stadium: Stadio Artemio Franchi; Attendance: 36,707; Referee: Fabrizio Pasqua

3 April 2019 30	Roma	2–2	Fiorentina	Rome
21:00 CEST (UTC+02:00)	Kolarov (yellow card) 3'; Zaniolo 14'; Perotti 57', (yellow card) 70'; Karsdorp (yellow card) 71'	Report	Pezzella 12'; Gerson 51'; Simeone (yellow card) 66'; Milenković (yellow card) 70'; Veretout (yellow card) 84'; Biraghi (yellow card) 88'	Stadium: Stadio Olimpico; Attendance: 30,123; Referee: Davide Massa

7 April 2019 31	Fiorentina	0–1	Frosinone	Florence
12:30 CEST (UTC+02:00)	Dabo (yellow card) 90+1'	Report	Beghetto (yellow card) 41'; Paganini (yellow card) 59'; Capuano (yellow card) 71'; Ciofani 84'; Goldaniga (yellow card) 90'	Stadium: Stadio Artemio Franchi; Attendance: 26,958; Referee: Daniele Chiffi

14 April 2019 32	Fiorentina	0–0	Bologna	Florence
15:00 CEST (UTC+02:00)	Muriel (yellow card) 74'; Veretout (yellow card) 90+3'	Report	Dijks (yellow card) 28'; Palacio (yellow card) 76'; Santander (yellow card) 83'	Stadium: Stadio Artemio Franchi; Attendance: 29,394; Referee: Piero Giacomelli

20 April 2019 33	Juventus	2–1	Fiorentina	Turin
18:00 CEST (UTC+02:00)	Alex Sandro 37'; Pezzella 53' (o.g.)	Report	Milenković 6'; Gerson (yellow card) 80'	Stadium: Allianz Stadium; Attendance: 40,339; Referee: Fabrizio Pasqua

29 April 2019 34	Fiorentina	0–1	Sassuolo	Florence
21:00 CEST (UTC+02:00)	Laurini (yellow card) 8'; Pezzella (yellow card) 29'; Beloko (yellow card) 85'	Report	Berardi 37'; Peluso (yellow card) 40'	Stadium: Stadio Artemio Franchi; Attendance: 25,567; Referee: Francesco Fourneau

5 May 2019 35	Empoli	1–0	Fiorentina	Empoli
12:30 CEST (UTC+02:00)	Pajač (yellow card) 24'; Farias 54'; Bennacer (yellow card) 65'; Di Lorenzo (yellow card) 79'	Report	Fernandes (yellow card) 23'; Veretout (red card) 90+6'	Stadium: Stadio Carlo Castellani; Attendance: 8,285; Referee: Massimiliano Irrati
Note: Jordan Veretout was sent off after the final whistle for insulting the referee.

11 May 2019 36	Fiorentina	0–1	Milan	Florence
20:30 CEST (UTC+02:00)	Biraghi (yellow card) 34'; Laurini (yellow card) 67'	Report	Çalhanoğlu 35'; G. Donnarumma (yellow card) 79'	Stadium: Stadio Artemio Franchi; Attendance: 33,250; Referee: Maurizio Mariani

19 May 2019 37	Parma	1–0	Fiorentina	Parma
15:00 CEST (UTC+02:00)	Gerson 80' (o.g.)	Report	Benassi (yellow card) 90+4'	Stadium: Stadio Ennio Tardini; Attendance: 17,333; Referee: Piero Giacomelli

26 May 2019 38	Fiorentina	0–0	Genoa	Florence
20:30 CEST (UTC+02:00)	Gerson (yellow card) 21'	Report	Radovanović (yellow card) 81'; Bessa (yellow card) 84'	Stadium: Stadio Artemio Franchi; Attendance: 37,527; Referee: Daniele Orsato

=== Coppa Italia ===
13 January 2019 Round of 16	Torino	0–2	Fiorentina	Turin
15:00 CET (UTC+01:00)	Aina (yellow card) 75'	Report	Benassi (yellow card) 24'; Milenković (yellow card) 32'; Veretout (yellow card) 45'; Pezzella (yellow card) 53'; Chiesa 87', 90+2'	Stadium: Stadio Olimpico Grande Torino; Attendance: 16,957; Referee: Rosario Abisso

30 January 2019 Quarter-finals	Fiorentina	7–1	Roma	Florence
18:15 CET (UTC+01:00)	Chiesa 7', 18', 74'; Muriel 33', (yellow card) 69'; Benassi 66'; Simeone 79', 89'	Report	Zaniolo (yellow card) 11'; Kolarov 28'; El Shaarawy (yellow card) 31'; Pellegrini (yellow card) 71'; Džeko (red card) 72'	Stadium: Stadio Artemio Franchi; Attendance: 21,190; Referee: Gianluca Manganiello

27 February 2019 Semi-finals; First leg	Fiorentina	3–3	Atalanta	Florence
21:00 CET (UTC+01:00)	Vitor Hugo (yellow card) 27'; Chiesa 33'; Benassi 36'; Muriel 79'; Biraghi (yellow card) 81'; Laurini (yellow card) 90+4'	Report	Gómez 16'; Pašalić 18'; Mancini (yellow card) 35'; Toloi (yellow card) 40'; Hateboer (yellow card) 45+2'; De Roon 58'	Stadium: Stadio Artemio Franchi; Attendance: 34,437; Referee: Piero Giacomelli

25 April 2019 Semi-finals; Second leg	Atalanta	2–1 (5–4 agg.)	Fiorentina	Bergamo
20:45 CEST (UTC+02:00)	Iličić 14' (pen.); Gómez 69'; Gosens (yellow card) 74'	Report	Muriel 3'; Ceccherini (yellow card) 16'; Pezzella (yellow card) 72'; Mirallas (yellow card) 80'	Stadium: Stadio Atleti Azzurri d'Italia; Attendance: 20,416; Referee: Gianpaolo Calvarese

== Statistics ==
=== Appearances and goals ===
No.	Pos	Nat	Player	Total		Serie A		Coppa Italia	
No.	Pos	Nat	Player	Apps	Goals	Apps	Goals	Apps	Goals
Goalkeepers
1	GK	(France) FRA	Alban Lafont	38	0	34	0	4	0
23	GK	(Italy) ITA	Pietro Terracciano	2	0	2	0	0	0
33	GK	(Italy) ITA	Federico Brancolini	0	0	0	0	0	0
67	GK	(Italy) ITA	Simone Ghidotti	0	0	0	0	0	0
Defenders
2	DF	(France) FRA	Vincent Laurini	17	0	10+5	0	0+2	0
3	DF	(Italy) ITA	Cristiano Biraghi	40	1	36	1	4	0
4	DF	(Serbia) SRB	Nikola Milenković	38	3	34	3	4	0
5	DF	(Italy) ITA	Federico Ceccherini	17	0	11+4	0	2	0
15	DF	(Uruguay) URU	Maximiliano Olivera	0	0	0	0	0	0
16	DF	(Slovakia) SVK	Dávid Hancko	5	0	3+2	0	0	0
20	DF	(Argentina) ARG	Germán Pezzella	35	2	32	2	3	0
31	DF	(Brazil) BRA	Vitor Hugo	33	0	27+3	0	3	0
Midfielders
6	MF	(Denmark) DEN	Christian Nørgaard	6	0	4+2	0	0	0
8	MF	(Brazil) BRA	Gerson	40	3	27+9	3	2+2	0
14	MF	(Burkina Faso) BFA	Bryan Dabo	26	1	6+17	1	1+2	0
17	MF	(France) FRA	Jordan Veretout	37	5	33	5	4	0
18	MF	(Switzerland) SUI	Nicky Beloko	1	0	0+1	0	0	0
19	MF	(Spain) ESP	Cristóbal Montiel	1	0	0+1	0	0	0
24	MF	(Italy) ITA	Marco Benassi	36	9	29+3	7	4	2
26	MF	(Switzerland) SUI	Edimilson Fernandes	33	2	23+6	2	2+2	0
Forwards
9	FW	(Argentina) ARG	Giovanni Simeone	40	8	27+9	6	0+4	2
10	FW	(Croatia) CRO	Marko Pjaca	19	1	8+11	1	0	0
11	FW	(Belgium) BEL	Kevin Mirallas	30	2	15+12	2	3	0
25	FW	(Italy) ITA	Federico Chiesa	41	12	34+3	6	4	6
28	FW	(Serbia) SRB	Dušan Vlahović	10	0	1+9	0	0	0
29	FW	(Colombia) COL	Luis Muriel	23	9	16+3	6	4	3
Players transferred out during the season
7	MF	(France) FRA	Valentin Eysseric	8	0	4+4	0	0	0
21	FW	(Italy) ITA	Riccardo Sottil	2	0	0+2	0	0	0
69	GK	(Poland) POL	Bartłomiej Drągowski	3	0	2+1	0	0	0
77	FW	(France) FRA	Cyril Théréau	2	0	0+2	0	0	0

Last updated: 26 May 2019
Source: Competitions

=== Goalscorers ===
Rank	No.	Pos	Nat	Name	Serie A	Coppa Italia	Total
1	25	FW	(Italy)	Federico Chiesa	6	6	12
2	24	MF	(Italy)	Marco Benassi	7	2	9
2	29	FW	(Colombia)	Luis Muriel	6	3	9
4	9	FW	(Argentina)	Giovanni Simeone	6	2	8
5	17	MF	(France)	Jordan Veretout	5	0	5
6	4	DF	(Serbia)	Nikola Milenković	3	0	3
6	8	MF	(Brazil)	Gerson	3	0	3
8	11	FW	(Belgium)	Kevin Mirallas	2	0	2
8	20	DF	(Argentina)	Germán Pezzella	2	0	2
8	26	MF	(Switzerland)	Edimilson Fernandes	2	0	2
11	3	DF	(Italy)	Cristiano Biraghi	1	0	1
11	10	FW	(Croatia)	Marko Pjaca	1	0	1
11	14	MF	(Burkina Faso)	Bryan Dabo	1	0	1
Own goal					2	0	2
Totals					47	13	60

Last updated: 26 May 2019

=== Clean sheets ===
Rank	No.	Pos	Nat	Name	Serie A	Coppa Italia	Total
1	1	GK	(France)	Alban Lafont	9*	1	10
2	69	GK	(Poland)	Bartłomiej Drągowski	1*	0	1
Totals					9	1	10

* Includes one shared clean sheet against Udinese.

Last updated: 26 May 2019

=== Disciplinary record ===
No.	Pos	Nat	Name	Serie A			Coppa Italia			Total		
No.	Pos	Nat	Name	Booked	(yellow card) (yellow-red card)	Sent off (straight red)	Booked	(yellow card) (yellow-red card)	Sent off (straight red)	Booked	(yellow card) (yellow-red card)	Sent off (straight red)
1	GK	(France)	Alban Lafont	2	0	0	0	0	0	2	0	0
2	DF	(France)	Vincent Laurini	4	0	0	1	0	0	5	0	0
3	DF	(Italy)	Cristiano Biraghi	8	0	0	1	0	0	9	0	0
4	DF	(Serbia)	Nikola Milenković	7	1	0	1	0	0	8	1	0
5	DF	(Italy)	Federico Ceccherini	3	0	0	1	0	0	4	0	0
20	DF	(Argentina)	Germán Pezzella	6	0	0	2	0	0	8	0	0
31	DF	(Brazil)	Vitor Hugo	7	0	1	1	0	0	8	0	1
7	MF	(France)	Valentin Eysseric	1	0	0	0	0	0	1	0	0
8	MF	(Brazil)	Gerson	8	0	0	0	0	0	8	0	0
14	MF	(Burkina Faso)	Bryan Dabo	4	0	0	0	0	0	4	0	0
17	MF	(France)	Jordan Veretout	12	0	1	1	0	0	13	0	1
18	MF	(Switzerland)	Nicky Beloko	1	0	0	0	0	0	1	0	0
24	MF	(Italy)	Marco Benassi	6	0	1	1	0	0	7	0	1
26	MF	(Switzerland)	Edimilson Fernandes	8	1	0	0	0	0	8	1	0
9	FW	(Argentina)	Giovanni Simeone	2	0	0	0	0	0	2	0	0
10	FW	(Croatia)	Marko Pjaca	1	0	0	0	0	0	1	0	0
11	FW	(Belgium)	Kevin Mirallas	2	0	0	1	0	0	3	0	0
25	FW	(Italy)	Federico Chiesa	4	0	0	0	0	0	4	0	0
29	FW	(Colombia)	Luis Muriel	1	0	0	1	0	0	2	0	0
77	FW	(France)	Cyril Théréau	1	0	0	0	0	0	1	0	0
Totals				88	2	3	11	0	0	99	2	3

Last updated: 26 May 2019
