= 2017–18 ACF Fiorentina season =

Fiorentina
2017–18 season
- President: Mario Cognigni
- Manager: Stefano Pioli
- Stadium: Stadio Artemio Franchi
- Serie A: 8th
- Coppa Italia: Quarter-finals
- Top goalscorer: League: Giovanni Simeone (14); All: Giovanni Simeone (14)
- Highest home attendance: 34,690 vs Cagliari (13 May 2018, Serie A)
- Lowest home attendance: 7,038 vs Sampdoria (13 December 2017, Coppa Italia)
- Average home league attendance: 26,092
Home colours	Away colours	Third colours

The 2017–18 season was the 91st season in ACF Fiorentina's history and their 80th in the top-flight of Italian football. Fiorentina competed in Serie A and the Coppa Italia, missing out on European football for the first time since the 2012–13 season following an eighth-place finish in the 2016–17 season. ACF Fiorentina are the first club in the history of football to wear 5 player kits.

On 6 June 2017, coach Paulo Sousa was replaced after two seasons at the helm by former Fiorentina player and Inter coach Stefano Pioli, who signed a contract tying him to the Florence club for two seasons with the option of a third.

On 4 March 2018, club captain Davide Astori died in his sleep while staying in a hotel in Udine prior to Fiorentina's match against Udinese, proven to be caused by cardiac arrest determined from an autopsy conducted two days later.

In the league Fiorentina finished just outside the European spots in 8th, while they were eliminated in the quarter-finals of the Coppa Italia. New signing Giovanni Simeone, son of Atlético Madrid coach Diego Simeone, finished as the club's top scorer with 14 goals in total, all of them coming in Serie A.

== Players ==
=== Squad information ===
Last updated on 20 May 2018
Appearances include league matches only

No.	Name	Nat	Position(s)	Date of birth (Age at end of season)	Signed from	Signed in	Contract ends	Apps.	Goals
Goalkeepers
22	Michele Cerofolini	(Italy)	GK	4 February 1999 (aged 19)	(Italy) Youth Sector	2017	2019	0	0
57	Marco Sportiello	(Italy)	GK	10 May 1992 (aged 26)	(Italy) Atalanta	2017	2018	39	0
97	Bartłomiej Drągowski	(Poland)	GK	19 August 1997 (aged 20)	(Poland) Jagiellonia Białystok	2016	2021	4	0
Defenders
2	Vincent Laurini	(France)	RB	10 June 1989 (aged 29)	(Italy) Empoli	2017	2018	22	0
3	Cristiano Biraghi	(Italy)	LB	1 September 1992 (aged 25)	(Italy) Pescara	2017	2018	34	1
4	Nikola Milenković	(Serbia)	CB	12 October 1997 (aged 20)	(Serbia) Partizan	2017	2022	16	0
13	Davide Astori (Captain) (Note: On 4 March 2018, Astori died while staying in a hotel in Udine prior to Fiorentina's match against Udinese.)	(Italy)	CB	7 January 1987 (aged 31)	(Italy) Cagliari	2015	2019	91	3
15	Maximiliano Olivera	(Uruguay)	CB / LB	5 March 1992 (aged 26)	(Uruguay) Peñarol	2016	2021	25	0
20	Germán Pezzella	(Argentina)	CB	27 June 1991 (aged 27)	(Spain) Real Betis	2017	2018	34	1
26	Luca Ranieri	(Italy)	LB	23 April 1999 (aged 19)	(Italy) Youth Sector	2017	—	0	0
31	Vitor Hugo	(Brazil)	CB	20 May 1991 (aged 27)	(Brazil) Palmeiras	2017	2021	19	1
51	Petko Hristov	(Bulgaria)	CB	1 March 1999 (aged 19)	(Bulgaria) Slavia Sofia	2017	2022	0	0
76	Bruno Gaspar	(Portugal)	RB	21 April 1993 (aged 25)	(Portugal) Vitória de Guimarães	2017	2022	15	0
Midfielders
5	Milan Badelj (Captain) (Note: After 4 March 2018, captain Davide Astori's death, Badelj was given the captaincy.)	(Croatia)	DM / CM	25 February 1989 (aged 29)	(Germany) Hamburg	2014	2018	108	6
8	Riccardo Saponara	(Italy)	AM	21 December 1991 (aged 26)	(Italy) Empoli	2017	2018	28	2
10	Valentin Eysseric	(France)	AM / LW	25 March 1992 (aged 26)	(France) Nice	2017	2021	21	1
14	Bryan Dabo	(France)	CM	13 February 1992 (aged 26)	(France) Saint-Étienne	2018	2021	10	1
17	Jordan Veretout	(France)	CM	1 March 1993 (aged 25)	(England) Aston Villa	2017	2021	36	8
19	Sebastián Cristóforo	(Uruguay)	CM	23 August 1993 (aged 24)	(Spain) Sevilla	2017	2021	22	0
24	Marco Benassi	(Italy)	CM	8 September 1994 (aged 23)	(Italy) Torino	2017	2022	35	5
28	Gil Dias	(Portugal)	AM / LW	28 September 1996 (aged 21)	(France) Monaco	2017	2019	27	2
73	Marco Meli	(Italy)	AM	2 February 2000 (aged 18)	(Italy) Youth Sector	2017		0	0
Forwards
9	Giovanni Simeone	(Argentina)	CF / ST	5 July 1995 (aged 22)	(Italy) Genoa	2017	2022	38	14
11	Diego Falcinelli	(Italy)	CF / ST	26 June 1991 (aged 27)	(Italy) Sassuolo	2018	2018	12	0
21	Riccardo Sottil	(Italy)	CF / RW	3 June 1999 (aged 19)	(Italy) Youth Sector	2016		0	0
25	Federico Chiesa	(Italy)	AM / RW	25 October 1997 (aged 20)	(Italy) Youth Sector	2016	2021	63	9
27	Simone Lo Faso	(Italy)	SS / AM / LW	18 February 1998 (aged 20)	(Italy) Palermo	2017	2018	2	0
32	Gabriele Gori	(Italy)	CF / ST	13 February 1999 (aged 19)	(Italy) Youth Sector	2017	—	0	0
77	Cyril Théréau	(France)	CF / ST	24 April 1983 (aged 35)	(Italy) Udinese	2017	2019	20	5
Players transferred during the season
6	Carlos Sánchez	(Colombia)	DM / CM	6 February 1986 (aged 32)	(England) Aston Villa	2016	2018	33	2
7	Rafik Zekhnini	(Norway)	CF / ST	12 January 1998 (aged 20)	(Norway) Odds	2017	2022	1	0
11	Ianis Hagi	(Romania)	AM / RW	28 October 1998 (aged 19)	(Romania) Viitorul Constanța	2016	2019	2	0
30	Khouma Babacar	(Senegal)	CF / ST	17 March 1993 (aged 25)	(Italy) Youth Sector	2009	2019	99	27
40	Nenad Tomović	(Serbia)	CB / RB	30 August 1987 (aged 30)	(Italy) Genoa	2012	2020	126	1

== Transfers ==
=== In ===
Date	Pos.	Player	Age	Moving from	Fee	Notes	Source
5 June 2017	DF	(Brazil) Vitor Hugo	26	(Brazil) Palmeiras	€8M		
16 June 2017	DF	(Serbia) Nikola Milenković	19	(Serbia) Partizan	€5.1M		
19 June 2017	DF	(Portugal) Bruno Gaspar	24	(Portugal) Vitória de Guimarães	€4M		
1 July 2017	FW	(Uruguay) Jaime Báez	22	(Italy) Spezia	Loan return		
1 July 2017	DF	(Croatia) Ricardo Bagadur	21	(Italy) Benevento	Loan return		
1 July 2017	MF	(Uruguay) Sebastián Cristóforo	23	(Spain) Sevilla	€2.5M	Obligation to buy exercised	
1 July 2017	DF	(Netherlands) Kevin Diks	20	(Netherlands) Vitesse	Loan return		
1 July 2017	MF	(Chile) Matías Fernández	31	(Italy) Milan	Loan return		
1 July 2017	GK	(Italy) Luca Lezzerini	22	(Italy) Avellino	Loan return		
1 July 2017	MF	(Italy) Jacopo Petriccione	22	(Italy) Ternana	Loan return		
1 July 2017	FW	(Croatia) Ante Rebić	23	(Germany) Eintracht Frankfurt	Loan return		
9 July 2017	MF	(Colombia) Carlos Sánchez	31	(England) Aston Villa	€3M	Obligation to buy exercised	
12 July 2017	FW	(Czech Republic) Martin Graiciar	18	(Czech Republic) Liberec	€1.5M		
17 July 2017	DF	(Bulgaria) Petko Hristov	18	(Bulgaria) Slavia Sofia	€1.7M		
17 July 2017	FW	(Norway) Rafik Zekhnini	19	(Norway) Odds	€1.5M		
25 July 2017	MF	(France) Jordan Veretout	24	(England) Aston Villa	€7M		
9 August 2017	MF	(Italy) Marco Benassi	22	(Italy) Torino	€10M		
9 August 2017	MF	(France) Valentin Eysseric	25	(France) Nice	€3.5M		
16 August 2017	FW	(Argentina) Giovanni Simeone	22	(Italy) Genoa	€15M	€15M + €3M in bonuses	
31 August 2017	FW	(France) Cyril Théréau	34	(Italy) Udinese	€2M		
30 January 2018	MF	(France) Bryan Dabo	25	(France) Saint-Étienne	Undisclosed		

==== Loans in ====
Date	Pos.	Player	Age	Moving from	Fee	Notes	Source
15 August 2017	MF	(Portugal) Gil Dias	20	(France) Monaco	Loan	2-year loan with an option to buy	
15 August 2017	DF	(Italy) Cristiano Biraghi	24	(Italy) Pescara	€0.5M	Loan with an obligation to buy for €2M	
18 August 2017	DF	(Argentina) Germán Pezzella	26	(Spain) Real Betis	€0.5M	Loan with an option to buy for €10M	
28 August 2017	DF	(France) Vincent Laurini	28	(Italy) Empoli	€0.4M	Loan with an obligation to buy for €1.6M	
31 August 2017	FW	(Italy) Simone Lo Faso	19	(Italy) Palermo	€0.3M	Loan with an obligation to buy for €2.7M	
18 January 2018	FW	(Slovenia) Nino Kukovec	16	(Slovenia) Maribor	Loan	Loan with an obligation to buy after two years	
31 January 2018	FW	(Italy) Diego Falcinelli	26	(Italy) Sassuolo	Loan	Swapped for Khouma Babacar	

Total spending: ▼€66.5M

=== Out ===
Date	Pos.	Player	Age	Moving to	Fee	Notes	Source
1 July 2017	MF	(Uruguay) Sebastián Cristóforo	23	(Spain) Sevilla	Loan return		
1 July 2017	DF	(France) Sebastian De Maio	30	(Belgium) Anderlecht	Loan return		
1 July 2017	DF	(Argentina) Gonzalo Rodríguez	33	(Argentina) San Lorenzo	End of contract		
1 July 2017	FW	(Italy) Giuseppe Rossi	30	Unattached	End of contract		
1 July 2017	DF	(Mexico) Carlos Salcedo	23	(Mexico) Guadalajara	Loan return		
1 July 2017	FW	(Spain) Cristian Tello	25	(Spain) Barcelona	Loan return		
5 July 2017	MF	(Slovenia) Josip Iličić	29	(Italy) Atalanta	€5.5M		
10 July 2017	MF	(Spain) Borja Valero	32	(Italy) Internazionale	€5.5M	€5.5M + €1.5M in bonuses	
11 July 2017	GK	(Italy) Luca Lezzerini	22	(Italy) Avellino	Undisclosed		
23 July 2017	DF	(Croatia) Hrvoje Milić	28	(Greece) Olympiacos	€1.5M		
24 July 2017	FW	(Italy) Federico Bernardeschi	23	(Italy) Juventus	€40M		
27 July 2017	GK	(Romania) Ciprian Tătărușanu	31	(France) Nantes	€2.39M		
27 July 2017	DF	(Croatia) Ricardo Bagadur	21	(Italy) Brescia	€0.3M		
2 August 2017	MF	(Uruguay) Matías Vecino	25	(Italy) Internazionale	€24M		
11 August 2017	GK	(Italy) Giacomo Satalino	18	(Italy) Sassuolo	€0.5M		
4 September 2017	MF	(Chile) Matías Fernández	31	(Mexico) Necaxa	Free		

==== Loans out ====
Date	Pos.	Player	Age	Moving to	Fee	Notes	Source
4 July 2017	DF	(Netherlands) Kevin Diks	20	(Netherlands) Feyenoord	Loan		
7 July 2017	FW	(Slovenia) Jan Mlakar	18	(Italy) Venezia	Loan	Loan with an option to buy	
8 July 2017	DF	(Italy) Lorenzo Venuti	22	(Italy) Benevento	Loan		
11 July 2017	FW	(Italy) Gaetano Castrovilli	20	(Italy) Cremonese	Loan		
12 July 2017	FW	(Czech Republic) Martin Graiciar	18	(Czech Republic) Liberec	Loan		
21 July 2017	FW	(Italy) Simone Minelli	20	(Italy) Trapani	Loan		
22 July 2017	MF	(Democratic Republic of the Congo) Andy Bangu	19	(Italy) Vicenza	Loan		
21 August 2017	FW	(Uruguay) Jaime Báez	22	(Italy) Pescara	Loan		
22 August 2017	FW	(Croatia) Nikola Kalinić	29	(Italy) Milan	€5M	Loan with an obligation to buy for €20M	
26 August 2017	MF	(Uruguay) Andrés Schetino	20	(Denmark) Esbjerg	Loan	Loan with an option to buy	
31 August 2017	FW	(Croatia) Ante Rebić	23	(Germany) Eintracht Frankfurt	Loan	Loan with an obligation to buy for €4M	
31 August 2017	DF	(Serbia) Nenad Tomović	30	(Italy) Chievo	€0.3M		
31 August 2017	FW	(United States) Joshua Pérez	19	(Italy) Livorno	Loan		
29 December 2017	DF	(Brazil) Gilberto	24	(Brazil) Fluminense	Loan	12-month loan	
31 January 2018	FW	(Senegal) Khouma Babacar	24	(Italy) Sassuolo	Loan	Swapped for Diego Falcinelli	
31 January 2018	MF	(Colombia) Carlos Sánchez	31	(Spain) Espanyol	Loan		

Total income: ▲€84.99M

== Pre-season and friendlies ==
12 July 2017 Friendly	Fiorentina	7–0	Val di Fassa Team	Moena, Italy
17:30 CEST (UTC+02:00)	Gori 7', 10'; Sottil 8'; Maganjić 52', 66'; Schetino 79'; Hagi 83'	Report		Stadium: Campo Sportivo Cesare Benatti; Attendance: 1,500

15 July 2017 Friendly	Fiorentina	11–0	Trentino Team	Moena, Italy
17:30 CEST (UTC+02:00)	Olivera 4'; Hagi 15', 45'; Vitor Hugo 18'; Meli 28'; Babacar 44'; Schetino 55'; Gori 61'; Báez 63'; Cristóforo 65'; Maganjić 75'	Report		Stadium: Campo Sportivo Cesare Benatti; Attendance: 1,500

19 July 2017 Friendly	Fiorentina	5–0	Trento	Moena, Italy
17:30 CEST (UTC+02:00)	Babacar 2' (pen.); Zekhnini 7'; Hagi 43'; Gori 76'; Casagrande 84' (o.g.)	Report		Stadium: Campo Sportivo Cesare Benatti; Attendance: 1,500

22 July 2017 Friendly	Fiorentina	1–1	Bari	Moena, Italy
17:30 CEST (UTC+02:00)	Báez 73'	Report	Improta 33'	Stadium: Campo Sportivo Cesare Benatti; Attendance: 1,500

29 July 2017 Friendly	Sporting CP (Portugal)	1–0	(Italy) Fiorentina	Lisbon, Portugal
18:00 CEST (UTC+02:00)	Dost 28'	Report		Stadium: Estádio José Alvalade

1 August 2017 Friendly	Eintracht Braunschweig (Germany)	2–3	(Italy) Fiorentina	Salzgitter, Germany
18:30 CEST (UTC+02:00)	Hernández 26', 67'	Report	Chiesa 10', 12'; Olivera (yellow card) 15'; Milenković 78'	Stadium: Stadion am Salzgittersee; Attendance: 1,932

6 August 2017 Friendly	Wolfsburg (Germany)	0–2	(Italy) Fiorentina	Wolfsburg, Germany
16:00 CEST (UTC+2:00)		Report	Kalinić 39'; Chiesa 51'	Stadium: AOK-Stadion; Attendance: 4,782

10 August 2017 Friendly	Pistoiese	0–3	Fiorentina	Pistoia, Italy
20:30 CEST (UTC+2:00)		Report	Eysseric 27' (pen.); Babacar 51' (pen.); Rebić 85'	Stadium: Stadio Marcello Melani

13 August 2017 Friendly	Fiorentina	0–0	Parma	Viareggio, Italy
18:00 CEST (UTC+2:00)		Report		Stadium: Stadio Torquato Bresciani

23 August 2017 Trofeo Santiago Bernabéu	Real Madrid (Spain)	2–1	(Italy) Fiorentina	Madrid, Spain
22:45 CEST (UTC+2:00)	Mayoral 7'; Ronaldo 34'	Report	Veretout 4'	Stadium: Santiago Bernabéu

== Competitions ==
=== Serie A ===
==== League table ====
Pos	Team	Pld	W	D	L	GF	GA	GD	Pts	Qualification or relegation
6	Milan (Note: Milan was originally banned from European competition due to violations against Financial Fair Play regulations. They appealed to the Court of Arbitration for Sport, and the ban was overturned on 20 July 2018.)	38	18	10	10	56	42	+14	64	Qualification to Europa League group stage (Note: Since the winners of the 2017–18 Coppa Italia, Juventus, qualified for European competition based on league position, the spot awarded to the cup winners (Europa League group stage) was passed to the sixth-placed team and the spot awarded to the sixth-placed team (Europa League second qualifying round) was passed to the seventh-placed team.)
7	Atalanta	38	16	12	10	57	39	+18	60	Qualification to Europa League second qualifying round
8	Fiorentina	38	16	9	13	54	46	+8	57	
9	Torino	38	13	15	10	54	46	+8	54	
10	Sampdoria	38	16	6	16	56	60	−4	54	

Source: Serie A, Soccerway
Rules for classification: 1) Points; 2) Head-to-head points; 3) Head-to-head goal difference; 4) Goal difference; 5) Goals scored; 6) Draw.

==== Results summary ====
Overall								Home						Away					
Pld	W	D	L	GF	GA	GD	Pts	W	D	L	GF	GA	GD	W	D	L	GF	GA	GD
38	16	9	13	54	46	+8	57	8	5	6	27	22	+5	8	4	7	27	24	+3

Last updated: 20 May 2018.
Source: Competitive matches

==== Results by round ====
Round	1	2	3	4	5	6	7	8	9	10	11	12	13	14	15	16	17	18	19	20	21	22	23	24	25	26	27	28	29	30	31	32	33	34	35	36	37	38
Ground	A	H	A	H	A	H	A	H	A	H	A	H	A	A	H	A	H	A	H	H	A	H	A	H	A	H	A	H	A	H	A	H	H	A	H	A	H	A
Result	L	L	W	W	L	D	L	W	W	W	L	L	D	D	W	D	D	W	D	D	L	L	W	L	D	W	W	W	W	W	W	D	L	L	W	W	L	L
Position	20	20	10	8	10	12	12	11	9	7	7	10	9	12	7	10	9	8	7	9	11	11	11	11	11	10	10	9	9	9	7	7	9	9	9	8	8	8

Updated to match(es) played on 20 May 2018. Source: Competitive matches
A = Away; H = Home; W = Win; D = Draw; L = Loss

==== Matches ====
20 August 2017 1	Internazionale	3–0	Fiorentina	Milan
20:45 CEST (UTC+02:00)	Icardi 6' (pen.), 15'; Perišić 79'	Report	Sánchez (yellow card) 14'	Stadium: San Siro; Attendance: 51,752; Referee: Paolo Tagliavento

27 August 2017 2	Fiorentina	1–2	Sampdoria	Florence
20:45 CEST (UTC+02:00)	Tomović (yellow card) 29'; Badelj (yellow card) 30', (goal) 50'; Chiesa (yellow card) 88'	Report	Praet (yellow card) 2'; Caprari 32'; Quagliarella 35' (pen.), (yellow card) 90+3'; Silvestre (yellow card) 80'; Torreira (yellow card) 90+2'	Stadium: Stadio Artemio Franchi; Attendance: 25,611; Referee: Daniele Doveri

10 September 2017 3	Hellas Verona	0–5	Fiorentina	Verona
15:00 CEST (UTC+02:00)	B. Zuculini (yellow card) 34'; Valoti (yellow card) 87'	Report	Simeone 2', (yellow card) 41'; Théréau 10' (pen.); Astori 24'; Veretout 62'; Dias 89'	Stadium: Stadio Marc'Antonio Bentegodi; Attendance: 18,181; Referee: Antonio Damato

16 September 2017 4	Fiorentina	2–1	Bologna	Florence
18:00 CEST (UTC+02:00)	Badelj (yellow card) 16'; Chiesa 51'; Pezzella 69'	Report	Palacio (yellow card) 9', (goal) 52'; Di Francesco (yellow card) 28'; Helander (yellow card) 76'	Stadium: Stadio Artemio Franchi; Attendance: 23,802; Referee: Paolo Valeri

20 September 2017 5	Juventus	1–0	Fiorentina	Turin
20:45 CEST (UTC+02:00)	Barzagli (yellow card) 23'; Mandžukić 52'	Report	Laurini (yellow card) 37'; Badelj (yellow card) 50' (yellow-red card) 66'; Astori (yellow card) 64'	Stadium: Allianz Stadium; Attendance: 35,652; Referee: Daniele Doveri

24 September 2017 6	Fiorentina	1–1	Atalanta	Florence
20:45 CEST (UTC+02:00)	Chiesa 12', (yellow card) 40'; Biraghi (yellow card) 51'	Report	Spinazzola (yellow card) 13'; De Roon (yellow card) 30'; Mancini (yellow card) 58'; Castagne (yellow card) 75'; Freuler 90+4'; Cristante (yellow card) 90+5'	Stadium: Stadio Artemio Franchi; Attendance: 21,390; Referee: Luca Pairetto
Note: Bryan Cristante was cautioned for dissent while a substitute.

1 October 2017 7	Chievo	2–1	Fiorentina	Verona
15:00 CEST (UTC+02:00)	Tomović (yellow card) 8'; Castro 25', 46'; Radovanović (yellow card) 61'	Report	Simeone 6'; Veretout (yellow card) 81'	Stadium: Stadio Marc'Antonio Bentegodi; Attendance: 10,000; Referee: Piero Giacomelli

15 October 2017 8	Fiorentina	2–1	Udinese	Florence
12:30 CEST (UTC+02:00)	Théréau 28', 57'; Veretout (yellow card) 54'	Report	Samir (yellow card) 53', (goal) 72'	Stadium: Stadio Artemio Franchi; Attendance: 25,156; Referee: Massimiliano Irrati

22 October 2017 9	Benevento	0–3	Fiorentina	Benevento
15:00 CEST (UTC+02:00)	Chibsah (yellow card) 40'; Cataldi (yellow card) 66'	Report	Benassi 18'; Pezzella (yellow card) 45'; Babacar 47'; Théréau 66' (pen.)	Stadium: Stadio Ciro Vigorito; Attendance: 10,887; Referee: Claudio Gavillucci

25 October 2017 10	Fiorentina	3–0	Torino	Florence
20:45 CEST (UTC+02:00)	Benassi 29'; Astori (yellow card) 41'; Simeone 66'; Babacar 75' (pen.)	Report	Baselli (yellow card) 18'; Rincón (yellow card) 61'; Barreca (red card) 73'; Moretti (yellow card) 76'	Stadium: Stadio Artemio Franchi; Attendance: 22,459; Referee: Maurizio Mariani

29 October 2017 11	Crotone	2–1	Fiorentina	Crotone
15:00 CET (UTC+01:00)	Budimir 17', (yellow card) 47'; Trotta 18'; Simić (yellow card) 74'; Cordaz (yellow card) 76'	Report	Astori (yellow card) 39'; Benassi 44'; Chiesa (yellow card) 62'; Babacar (yellow card) 74'	Stadium: Stadio Ezio Scida; Attendance: 8,906; Referee: Fabio Maresca

5 November 2017 12	Fiorentina	2–4	Roma	Florence
15:00 CET (UTC+01:00)	Veretout 9'; Simeone 39'; Pezzella (yellow card) 52'	Report	Gerson 5', 30'; Manolas 50'; Gonalons (yellow card) 67'; Perotti 87'	Stadium: Stadio Artemio Franchi; Attendance: 25,026; Referee: Marco Di Bello

19 November 2017 13	SPAL	1–1	Fiorentina	Ferrara
15:00 CET (UTC+01:00)	Borriello (yellow card) 40'; Paloschi 42'; Oikonomou (yellow card) 75' (yellow-red card) 90+1'; Viviani (yellow card) 90+2'	Report	Pezzella (yellow card) 28'; Benassi (yellow card) 60'; Sánchez (yellow card) 66'; Chiesa 80'	Stadium: Stadio Paolo Mazza; Attendance: 12,124; Referee: Gianpaolo Calvarese

26 November 2017 14	Lazio	1–1	Fiorentina	Rome
18:00 CET (UTC+01:00)	De Vrij 25'; Radu (yellow card) 87'; Milinković-Savić (yellow card) 90+7'	Report	Astori (yellow card) 11'; Laurini (yellow card) 49'; Babacar 90+4' (pen.)	Stadium: Stadio Olimpico; Attendance: 25,000; Referee: Davide Massa

3 December 2017 15	Fiorentina	3–0	Sassuolo	Florence
15:00 CET (UTC+01:00)	Simeone 32'; Benassi (yellow card) 39'; Veretout 42'; Chiesa 71'	Report	Berardi (yellow card) 56'; Magnanelli (yellow card) 72'; Cannavaro (yellow card) 80'	Stadium: Stadio Artemio Franchi; Attendance: 23,398; Referee: Luca Banti

10 December 2017 16	Napoli	0–0	Fiorentina	Naples
15:00 CET (UTC+01:00)	Diawara (yellow card) 86'; Callejón (yellow card) 90'; Rog (yellow card) 90+3'	Report	Badelj (yellow card) 36'; Veretout (yellow card) 51'; Gaspar (yellow card) 88'	Stadium: Stadio San Paolo; Attendance: 44,417; Referee: Michael Fabbri

17 December 2017 17	Fiorentina	0–0	Genoa	Florence
15:00 CET (UTC+01:00)	Théréau (yellow card) 26'; Badelj (yellow card) 82'	Report	Brlek (yellow card) 27'; Rosi (yellow card) 67'	Stadium: Stadio Artemio Franchi; Attendance: 21,043; Referee: Gianpaolo Calvarese

22 December 2017 18	Cagliari	0–1	Fiorentina	Cagliari
20:45 CET (UTC+01:00)	João Pedro (yellow card) 72' (red card) 90+3'; Barella (yellow card) 90+1'	Report	Vitor Hugo (yellow card) 52'; Babacar 82'; Chiesa (yellow card) 90+4'	Stadium: Sardegna Arena; Attendance: 14,297; Referee: Marco Di Bello

30 December 2017 19	Fiorentina	1–1	Milan	Florence
12:30 CET (UTC+01:00)	Simeone 71'; Veretout (yellow card) 82'	Report	Romagnoli (yellow card) 39'; Çalhanoğlu 74'	Stadium: Stadio Artemio Franchi; Attendance: 30,213; Referee: Luca Banti

5 January 2018 20	Fiorentina	1–1	Internazionale	Florence
20:45 CET (UTC+01:00)	Veretout (yellow card) 55'; Astori (yellow card) 87'; Simeone 90+1'	Report	Valero (yellow card) 11'; Ranocchia (yellow card) 28'; Icardi 55', (yellow card) 89'	Stadium: Stadio Artemio Franchi; Attendance: 29,428; Referee: Paolo Valeri

21 January 2018 21	Sampdoria	3–1	Fiorentina	Genoa
15:00 CET (UTC+01:00)	Quagliarella 30', 60', 68'; Torreira (yellow card) 86'	Report	Eysseric (yellow card) 33'; Pezzella (yellow card) 39'; Sánchez 80'	Stadium: Stadio Luigi Ferraris; Attendance: 19,083; Referee: Fabrizio Pasqua

28 January 2018 22	Fiorentina	1–4	Hellas Verona	Florence
15:00 CET (UTC+01:00)	Benassi (yellow card) 35'; Dias 53'; Pezzella (yellow card) 66'; Biraghi (yellow card) 82'	Report	Vuković 11'; Kean 20', 46', (yellow card) 45+2'; Caracciolo (yellow card) 35'; Valoti (yellow card) 48'; Fares (yellow card) 49'; Ferrari 55'	Stadium: Stadio Artemio Franchi; Attendance: 22,796; Referee: Claudio Gavillucci

4 February 2018 23	Bologna	1–2	Fiorentina	Bologna
15:00 CET (UTC+01:00)	Pulgar 44'; Mbaye (yellow card) 64'; Poli (yellow card) 83'	Report	Mirante 41' (o.g.); Chiesa 71'; Biraghi (yellow card) 82'	Stadium: Stadio Renato Dall'Ara; Attendance: 19,301; Referee: Daniele Doveri

9 February 2018 24	Fiorentina	0–2	Juventus	Florence
20:45 CET (UTC+01:00)	Dias (yellow card) 37'; Veretout (yellow card) 67'; Théréau (yellow card) 84'; Biraghi (yellow card) 89'	Report	Lichtsteiner (yellow card) 24'; Alex Sandro (yellow card) 39'; Bernardeschi 56'; Higuaín 86'; Benatia (yellow card) 90+4'	Stadium: Stadio Artemio Franchi; Attendance: 32,563; Referee: Marco Guida

18 February 2018 25	Atalanta	1–1	Fiorentina	Bergamo
18:00 CET (UTC+01:00)	Petagna 45+1', (yellow card) 79'; Mancini (yellow card) 70'	Report	Simeone (yellow card) 9'; Badelj 16', (yellow card) 31'; Benassi (yellow card) 48'; Milenković (yellow card) 83' (yellow-red card) 85'; Veretout (yellow card) 86'	Stadium: Stadio Atleti Azzurri d'Italia; Attendance: 17,261; Referee: Fabio Maresca

25 February 2018 26	Fiorentina	1–0	Chievo	Florence
15:00 CET (UTC+01:00)	Biraghi 6'; Simeone (yellow card) 26'	Report	Meggiorini (yellow card) 82'	Stadium: Stadio Artemio Franchi; Attendance: 21,225; Referee: Rosario Abisso

11 March 2018 28	Fiorentina	1–0	Benevento	Florence
12:30 CET (UTC+01:00)	Vitor Hugo 25'; Badelj (yellow card) 54'; Pezzella (yellow card) 62'	Report	Guilherme (yellow card) 49'; Lombardi (yellow card) 72'; Del Pinto (yellow card) 79'	Stadium: Stadio Artemio Franchi; Attendance: 34,381; Referee: Fabrizio Pasqua

18 March 2018 29	Torino	1–2	Fiorentina	Turin
15:00 CET (UTC+01:00)	De Silvestri (yellow card) 13'; Falque (yellow card) 23'; Niang (yellow card) 71'; Belotti 86'	Report	Veretout 59'; Biraghi (yellow card) 76'; Pezzella (yellow card) 85'; Benassi (yellow card) 90'; Théréau 90+4' (pen.)	Stadium: Stadio Olimpico Grande Torino; Attendance: 16,401; Referee: Claudio Gavillucci

31 March 2018 30	Fiorentina	2–0	Crotone	Florence
15:00 CEST (UTC+02:00)	Simeone 3'; Cristóforo (yellow card) 30'; Pezzella (yellow card) 32'; Veretout (yellow card) 43'; Chiesa 62'; Olivera (yellow card) 78'	Report	Ricci (yellow card) 16'; Mandragora (yellow card) 18'; Stoian (yellow card) 18'; Capuano (yellow card) 49' (yellow-red card) 57'	Stadium: Stadio Artemio Franchi; Attendance: 22,710; Referee: Paolo Valeri

3 April 2018 27	Udinese	0–2	Fiorentina	Udine
18:30 CEST (UTC+02:00)	Hallfreðsson (yellow card) 27'; De Paul (yellow card) 67'	Report	Veretout 29' (pen.); Pezella (yellow card) 44'; Vitor Hugo (yellow card) 56'; Chiesa (yellow card) 57'; Saponara (yellow card) 67'; Simeone 71'	Stadium: Dacia Arena; Attendance: 15,450; Referee: Luca Banti
Note: Postponed due to Fiorentina player Davide Astori's death; originally scheduled for 4 March 2018.

7 April 2018 31	Roma	0–2	Fiorentina	Rome
18:00 CEST (UTC+02:00)	Džeko (yellow card) 58'; El Shaarawy (yellow card) 75'; Juan Jesus (yellow card) 85'; Peres (yellow card) 90+1'	Report	Benassi 7'; Vitor Hugo (yellow card) 14'; Simeone 39'; Laurini (yellow card) 43'	Stadium: Stadio Olimpico; Attendance: 41,728; Referee: Michael Fabbri

15 April 2018 32	Fiorentina	0–0	SPAL	Florence
12:30 CEST (UTC+02:00)	Saponara (yellow card) 24'; Vitor Hugo (yellow card) 82'	Report	Everton Luiz (yellow card) 44'; Vitale (yellow card) 69'	Stadium: Stadio Artemio Franchi; Attendance: 29,651; Referee: Daniele Orsato

18 April 2018 33	Fiorentina	3–4	Lazio	Florence
20:45 CEST (UTC+02:00)	Sportiello (red card) 7'; Veretout 16', 31' (pen.), 54', (yellow card) 45+3'; Pezzella (yellow card) 75'; Chiesa (yellow card) 82'	Report	Murgia (red card) 14'; Luiz Felipe (yellow card) 27'; Luis Alberto 39', 72', (yellow card) 84'; Cáceres 45'; Felipe Anderson 70'	Stadium: Stadio Artemio Franchi; Attendance: 24,008; Referee: Antonio Damato

21 April 2018 34	Sassuolo	1–0	Fiorentina	Reggio Emilia
18:00 CEST (UTC+02:00)	Peluso (yellow card) 34'; Politano 41'; Berardi (yellow card) 43'; Lemos (yellow card) 47'; Adjapong (yellow card) 72'; Rogério (yellow card) 87'; Consigli (yellow card) 90+3'	Report	Dabo (yellow card) 6' (yellow-red card) 30'; Laurini (yellow card) 42'; Benassi (yellow card) 90'	Stadium: Mapei Stadium – Città del Tricolore; Attendance: 10,739; Referee: Massimiliano Irrati

29 April 2018 35	Fiorentina	3–0	Napoli	Florence
18:00 CEST (UTC+02:00)	Laurini (yellow card) 24'; Simeone 34', 62', 90+3'; Badelj (yellow card) 45+1'; Eysseric (yellow card) 78'	Report	Koulibaly (red card) 8'; Albiol (yellow card) 33'; Callejón (yellow card) 37'; Milik (yellow card) 60'; Insigne (yellow card) 76'; Mário Rui (yellow card) 79'	Stadium: Stadio Artemio Franchi; Attendance: 26,206; Referee: Paolo Mazzoleni

6 May 2018 36	Genoa	2–3	Fiorentina	Genoa
15:00 CEST (UTC+02:00)	Bertolacci (yellow card) 19'; Spolli (yellow card) 53'; Rossi 64'; Lapadula 68'; Pandev (red card) 71'; Zukanović (red card) 83'	Report	Badelj (yellow card) 29'; Benassi 43'; Gaspar (yellow card) 51'; Biraghi (yellow card) 61'; Saponara (yellow card) 63'; Eysseric 77'; Dabo 80', (yellow card) 81'; Chiesa (yellow card) 83'	Stadium: Stadio Luigi Ferraris; Attendance: 20,893; Referee: Gianluca Manganiello
Note: Ervin Zukanović was sent off for dissent while a substitute.

13 May 2018 37	Fiorentina	0–1	Cagliari	Florence
15:00 CEST (UTC+02:00)	Pezzella (yellow card) 41'; Biraghi (yellow card) 66'; Veretout (yellow card) 90+4' (red card) 90+5'	Report	Pavoletti 37', (yellow card) 86'; Barella (yellow card) 68'; Ceppitelli (yellow card) 90+6'; Caligara (yellow card) 90+7'	Stadium: Stadio Artemio Franchi; Attendance: 34,690; Referee: Paolo Valeri
Note: Fabrizio Caligara was cautioned for dissent while a substitute.

20 May 2018 38	Milan	5–1	Fiorentina	Milan
18:00 CEST (UTC+02:00)	Çalhanoğlu 23', (yellow card) 34'; Kessié (yellow card) 26'; Cutrone 41', 59'; Kalinić 49'; Bonaventura 76'	Report	Simeone 20'; Pezzella (yellow card) 22'	Stadium: San Siro; Attendance: 56,968; Referee: Michael Fabbri

=== Coppa Italia ===
13 December 2017 Round of 16	Fiorentina	3–2	Sampdoria	Florence
17:30 CET (UTC+01:00)	Babacar 2'; Veretout 59' (pen.), 90' (pen.)	Report	Barreto 39', (yellow card) 47'; Ramírez 77' (pen.); Strinić (yellow card) 81'	Stadium: Stadio Artemio Franchi; Attendance: 7,038; Referee: Rosario Abisso

26 December 2017 Quarter-finals	Lazio	1–0	Fiorentina	Rome
21:00 CET (UTC+01:00)	Lulić 6'; Strakosha (yellow card) 79'	Report	Gaspar (yellow card) 35'; Veretout (yellow card) 83'	Stadium: Stadio Olimpico; Attendance: 25,000; Referee: Antonio Damato

== Statistics ==
=== Appearances and goals ===
No.	Pos	Nat	Player	Total		Serie A		Coppa Italia	
No.	Pos	Nat	Player	Apps	Goals	Apps	Goals	Apps	Goals
Goalkeepers
22	GK	(Italy) ITA	Michele Cerofolini	0	0	0	0	0	0
57	GK	(Italy) ITA	Marco Sportiello	37	0	37	0	0	0
97	GK	(Poland) POL	Bartłomiej Drągowski	5	0	1+2	0	2	0
Defenders
2	DF	(France) FRA	Vincent Laurini	22	0	20+2	0	0	0
3	DF	(Italy) ITA	Cristiano Biraghi	35	1	34	1	1	0
4	DF	(Serbia) SRB	Nikola Milenković	17	0	14+2	0	1	0
13	DF	(Italy) ITA	Davide Astori	27	1	25	1	2	0
15	DF	(Uruguay) URU	Maximiliano Olivera	7	0	4+3	0	0	0
20	DF	(Argentina) ARG	Germán Pezzella	35	1	34	1	1	0
26	DF	(Italy) ITA	Luca Ranieri	0	0	0	0	0	0
31	DF	(Brazil) BRA	Vitor Hugo	21	1	13+6	1	1+1	0
51	DF	(Bulgaria) BUL	Petko Hristov	0	0	0	0	0	0
76	DF	(Portugal) POR	Bruno Gaspar	17	0	6+9	0	2	0
Midfielders
5	MF	(Croatia) CRO	Milan Badelj	27	2	27	2	0	0
8	MF	(Italy) ITA	Riccardo Saponara	20	0	10+8	0	2	0
10	MF	(France) FRA	Valentin Eysseric	23	1	8+13	1	0+2	0
14	MF	(France) FRA	Bryan Dabo	10	1	6+4	1	0	0
17	MF	(France) FRA	Jordan Veretout	38	10	36	8	2	2
19	MF	(Uruguay) URU	Sebastián Cristóforo	7	0	3+4	0	0	0
24	MF	(Italy) ITA	Marco Benassi	37	5	35	5	2	0
28	MF	(Portugal) POR	Gil Dias	28	2	9+18	2	0+1	0
73	MF	(Italy) ITA	Marco Meli	0	0	0	0	0	0
Forwards
9	FW	(Argentina) ARG	Giovanni Simeone	40	14	36+2	14	0+2	0
11	FW	(Italy) ITA	Diego Falcinelli	12	0	3+9	0	0	0
21	FW	(Italy) ITA	Riccardo Sottil	0	0	0	0	0	0
25	FW	(Italy) ITA	Federico Chiesa	38	6	35+1	6	2	0
27	FW	(Italy) ITA	Simone Lo Faso	2	0	0+2	0	0	0
32	FW	(Italy) ITA	Gabriele Gori	0	0	0	0	0	0
77	FW	(France) FRA	Cyril Théréau	20	5	16+4	5	0	0
Players transferred out during the season
6	MF	(Colombia) COL	Carlos Sánchez	11	1	3+6	1	2	0
7	FW	(Norway) NOR	Rafik Zekhnini	1	0	0+1	0	0	0
30	FW	(Senegal) SEN	Khouma Babacar	18	5	1+15	4	2	1
40	DF	(Serbia) SRB	Nenad Tomović	2	0	2	0	0	0

Last updated: 20 May 2018
Source: Competitions

=== Goalscorers ===
Rank	No.	Pos	Nat	Name	Serie A	Coppa Italia	Total
1	9	FW	(Argentina)	Giovanni Simeone	14	0	14
2	17	MF	(France)	Jordan Veretout	8	2	10
3	25	FW	(Italy)	Federico Chiesa	6	0	6
4	24	MF	(Italy)	Marco Benassi	5	0	5
4	30	FW	(Senegal)	Khouma Babacar	4	1	5
4	77	FW	(France)	Cyril Théréau	5	0	5
7	5	MF	(Croatia)	Milan Badelj	2	0	2
7	28	MF	(Portugal)	Gil Dias	2	0	2
9	3	DF	(Italy)	Cristiano Biraghi	1	0	1
9	6	MF	(Colombia)	Carlos Sánchez	1	0	1
9	10	MF	(France)	Valentin Eysseric	1	0	1
9	13	DF	(Italy)	Davide Astori	1	0	1
9	14	MF	(France)	Bryan Dabo	1	0	1
9	20	DF	(Argentina)	Germán Pezzella	1	0	1
9	31	DF	(Brazil)	Vitor Hugo	1	0	1
Own goal					1	0	1
Totals					54	3	57

Last updated: 20 May 2018

=== Clean sheets ===
Rank	No.	Pos	Nat	Name	Serie A	Coppa Italia	Total
1	57	GK	(Italy)	Marco Sportiello	14	0	14
Totals					14	0	14

Last updated: 20 May 2018

=== Disciplinary record ===
No.	Pos	Nat	Name	Serie A			Coppa Italia			Total		
No.	Pos	Nat	Name	Booked	(yellow card) (yellow-red card)	Sent off (straight red)	Booked	(yellow card) (yellow-red card)	Sent off (straight red)	Booked	(yellow card) (yellow-red card)	Sent off (straight red)
57	GK	(Italy)	Marco Sportiello	0	0	1	0	0	0	0	0	1
2	DF	(France)	Vincent Laurini	5	0	0	0	0	0	5	0	0
3	DF	(Italy)	Cristiano Biraghi	7	0	0	0	0	0	7	0	0
4	DF	(Serbia)	Nikola Milenković	0	1	0	0	0	0	0	1	0
13	DF	(Italy)	Davide Astori	5	0	0	0	0	0	5	0	0
15	DF	(Uruguay)	Maximiliano Olivera	1	0	0	0	0	0	1	0	0
20	DF	(Argentina)	Germán Pezzella	12	0	0	0	0	0	12	0	0
31	DF	(Brazil)	Vitor Hugo	4	0	0	0	0	0	4	0	0
40	DF	(Serbia)	Nenad Tomović	1	0	0	0	0	0	1	0	0
76	DF	(Portugal)	Bruno Gaspar	2	0	0	1	0	0	3	0	0
5	MF	(Croatia)	Milan Badelj	8	1	0	0	0	0	8	1	0
6	MF	(Colombia)	Carlos Sánchez	2	0	0	0	0	0	2	0	0
8	MF	(Italy)	Riccardo Saponara	3	0	0	0	0	0	3	0	0
10	MF	(France)	Valentin Eysseric	2	0	0	0	0	0	2	0	0
14	MF	(France)	Bryan Dabo	1	1	0	0	0	0	1	1	0
17	MF	(France)	Jordan Veretout	10	0	1	1	0	0	11	0	1
19	MF	(Uruguay)	Sebastián Cristóforo	1	0	0	0	0	0	1	0	0
24	MF	(Italy)	Marco Benassi	6	0	0	0	0	0	6	0	0
28	MF	(Portugal)	Gil Dias	1	0	0	0	0	0	1	0	0
9	FW	(Argentina)	Giovanni Simeone	3	0	0	0	0	0	3	0	0
25	FW	(Italy)	Federico Chiesa	7	0	0	0	0	0	7	0	0
30	FW	(Senegal)	Khouma Babacar	1	0	0	0	0	0	1	0	0
77	FW	(France)	Cyril Théréau	2	0	0	0	0	0	2	0	0
Totals				84	3	2	2	0	0	86	3	2

Last updated: 20 May 2018
