= Federico Chiesa =

Italian footballer (born 1997)

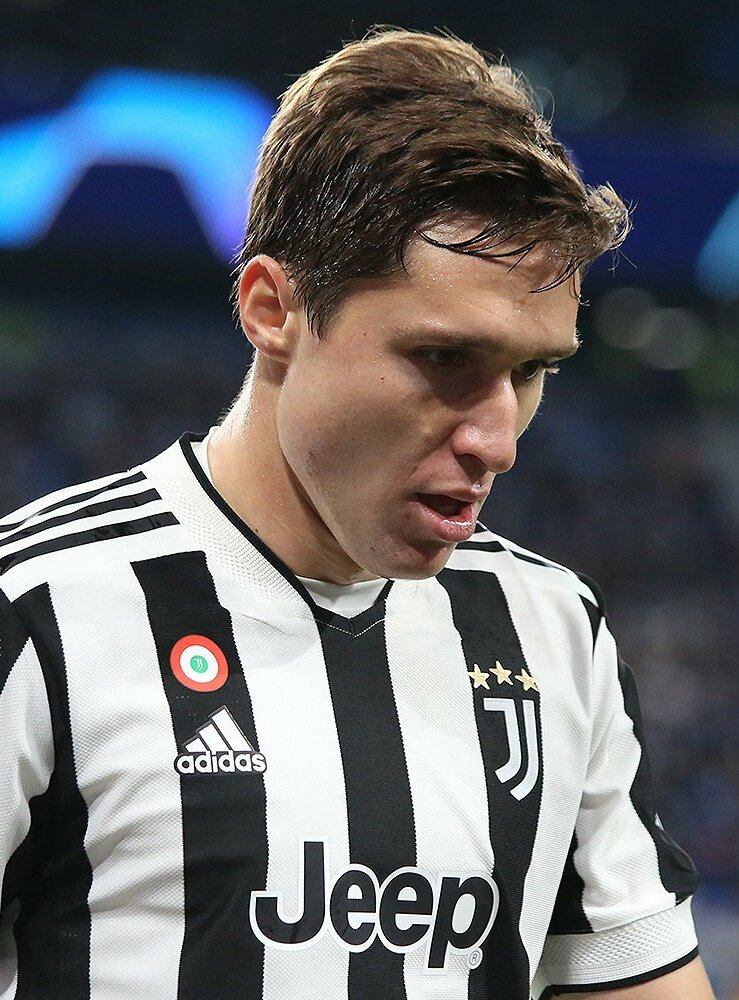
- Chiesa with Juventus in 2021

Personal information
- Full name: Federico Chiesa
- Date of birth: 25 October 1997 (age 29)
- Place of birth: Genoa, Italy
- Height: 1.75 m (5 ft 9 in)
- Position: Forward

Team information
- Current team: Liverpool
- Number: 14

Youth career
- 2002–2007: Settignanese
- 2007–2016: Fiorentina

Senior career*
Years	Team	Apps	(Gls)
2016–2022	Fiorentina	137	(26)
2020–2022	→ Juventus (loan)	44	(10)
2022–2024	Juventus	54	(11)
2024–	Liverpool	33	(2)

International career^{‡}
2015–2016	Italy U19	3	(0)
2016	Italy U20	5	(0)
2017–2019	Italy U21	13	(6)
2018–	Italy	51	(7)
Medal record
Men's football
Representing Italy
UEFA European Championship
Winner	2020 Europe
UEFA Nations League
Third place	2021 Italy
Third place	2023 Netherlands
- * Club domestic league appearances and goals as of 11 October 2026 (UTC) ‡ National team caps and goals as of 29 June 2024

Federico Chiesa (Italian pronunciation: [fedeˈriːko ˈkjɛːza; ˈkjeːza]; born 25 October 1997) is an Italian professional footballer who plays as a forward for Premier League club Liverpool and the Italy national team.

The son of former professional footballer Enrico Chiesa, he came through Fiorentina's youth academy, Chiesa made his first-team debut in 2016. He stayed at the club for four years, scoring 34 goals in 153 appearances in all competitions. Chiesa moved to Juventus in the 2020–21 season, winning the Coppa Italia and Supercoppa Italiana in his first season. He won another Coppa Italia in 2024, after which he was signed by English club Liverpool, where he won the Premier League title in his first season.

At international level, Chiesa made his senior debut for Italy in March 2018. He helped his country win the UEFA Euro 2020, while being named in the Team of the Tournament.

== Club career ==
Chiesa began his youth career with Settignanese from Settignano, a frazione northeast of Florence, where he was coached by former Fiorentina player Kurt Hamrin.

=== Fiorentina ===
Chiesa joined Fiorentina in 2007. Initially a member of their Giovanili side, he was assigned to the under-19 squad for the 2014–15 season, and scored a single goal in seven appearances for their Primavera side. The following season, he made 23 appearances and scored seven goals. Chiesa signed his first professional contract with Fiorentina in February 2016.

Chiesa made his competitive debut for Fiorentina in a 2–1 away defeat against Juventus, during the opening fixture of the 2016–17 Serie A season. Fiorentina manager Paulo Sousa opted to replace him at half-time with loan signing Cristian Tello. On 29 September, Chiesa made his UEFA Europa League debut in Fiorentina's 5–1 home win over Qarabağ. On 8 December, he marked his fourth Europa League appearance by scoring his first ever senior goal in a 1–2 away victory over Qarabağ; he was later sent off during the same match for a double booking.

On 15 January 2017, Chiesa appeared to score the match-winner in a 2–1 home win over rivals Juventus, from a Milan Badelj pass; however, the goal was awarded to Badelj, as, following review, the replays did not confirm whether Chiesa had deflected the pass. Later that month, Chiesa extended his contract with Fiorentina until 30 June 2021. On 21 January, he scored his first goal in Serie A in a 3–0 away victory over Chievo. Just eight days later, Chiesa scored his second league goal in a 3–3 home draw against Genoa. On 7 May, he netted the opening goal for Fiorentina in an eventual 2–2 draw against Sassuolo; this being his third goal for the club, and his first in Serie A in nearly four months. The goal came just four minutes after teammate Nikola Kalinić's penalty miss just after the half-hour mark.

On 16 September 2017, in the 2017–18 season, Chiesa marked his 30th league appearance for Fiorentina with a goal in the Derby dell'Appennino against Bologna; scoring the opener in the 51st minute of the game, in an eventual 2–1 home win. On 30 January 2019, during the 2018–19 season, Chiesa scored a hat-trick in the 7–1 home victory over Roma in the quarter-final match of the Coppa Italia.

=== Juventus ===
On 5 October 2020, Chiesa signed a two-year loan deal with Juventus; a €3 million loan for the first season and a €7 million loan for the second season, with a conditional obligation to buy for €40 million plus €10 million in variables. On 17 October, Chiesa made his debut for Juventus, providing an assist for Álvaro Morata and getting a straight red card in a 1–1 away draw to Crotone. He made his UEFA Champions League debut three days later, in a 2–0 away win over Dynamo Kyiv. Chiesa scored his first goal in the competition, and for Juventus, on 2 December, in a 3–0 home win against the same opponent.

Chiesa's first league goal for Juventus came on 16 December, scoring a long-distance goal in a 1–1 home draw against Atalanta. On 6 January 2021, Chiesa scored a brace against league-leaders Milan to help Juventus win 3–1 away from home; it was Milan's first league defeat in 27 games. He scored three goals against Porto in the 2020–21 UEFA Champions League round of 16: one in the first leg and two in the second leg. However, Juventus were eliminated on the away goals rule. On 19 May, Chiesa scored the match–winning goal in a 2–1 victory over Atalanta in the 2021 Coppa Italia final.

At the start of the new season, on 29 September 2021, in the 2021–22 UEFA Champions League, Chiesa scored the winning goal in a 1–0 home win against title holders Chelsea in a group stage match, equalling Alessandro Del Piero's record of four consecutive goals in the competition. On 9 January 2022, during a match against Roma, he suffered an anterior cruciate ligament injury, ruling him out for seven months. Chiesa ended his season early with four goals in 18 appearances.

On 2 November 2022, after nearly 10 months out of action, Chiesa made his season debut in a 2–1 home defeat against Paris Saint-Germain, replacing Fabio Miretti in the 74th minute, in their final 2022–23 UEFA Champions League match. In the 2023–24 season, he set a personal record by scoring nine goals in 33 appearances in Serie A.

=== Liverpool ===
==== 2024–25 season ====
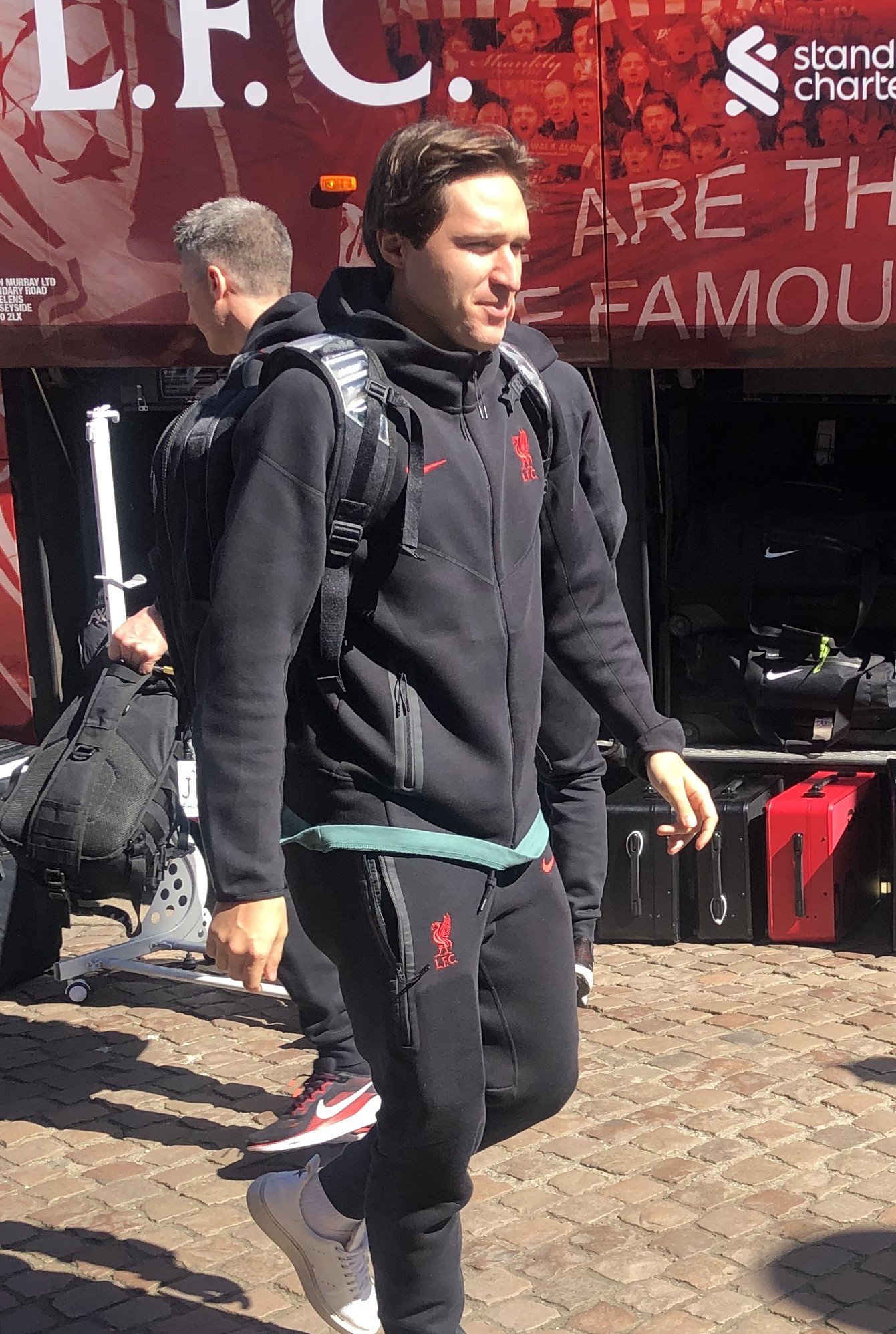
Chiesa with Liverpool in 2025

On 29 August 2024, Chiesa moved to the Premier League with Liverpool on a long-term deal reportedly worth £10 million plus £2.5 million in add-ons. He made his Liverpool debut as a substitute in the 93rd minute of a UEFA Champions League league phase match away against AC Milan that his side won 3–1. On 25 September, Chiesa made his first start and provided an assist in a 5–1 win against West Ham United in the EFL Cup.

On 11 January 2025, Chiesa scored his first goal for Liverpool in a 4–0 home victory over Accrington Stanley in the FA Cup third round. On 16 March, he came on as a substitute for Luis Díaz and scored late in the EFL Cup final against Newcastle United, which ended in a 2–1 defeat. In his first season in England, Chiesa struggled for minutes under manager Arne Slot.

Despite his limited minutes in the Premier League, on 4 May 2025, Chiesa made his fifth Premier League appearance for Liverpool as a substitute for Kostas Tsimikas in a 3–1 defeat against Chelsea, thus entitling him to a winner's medal. He became only the second Italian player to receive a Premier League winner's medal after Mario Balotelli in the 2011–12 season.

==== 2025–26 season ====
On 15 August 2025, Chiesa came on as a late substitute for Florian Wirtz and scored his first Premier League goal for Liverpool in the 88th minute against Bournemouth, giving his side the lead in an eventual 4–2 win.

On 23 September 2025, Chiesa produced two assists for Alexander Isak and Hugo Ekitike for Liverpool, in the 2–1 victory over Southampton in the EFL Cup. On 27 September, he scored an equalizer in a 2–1 Premier League defeat against Crystal Palace. He was later voted as Liverpool's Player of the Month for September.

== International career ==
=== Youth ===
Chiesa was called up to the Italy U19 squad in 2015. He was selected as part of Paolo Vanoli's preliminary 27-man squad for the 2016 UEFA European Under-19 Championship in Germany. Chiesa played for Italy U19s in friendlies against the Czech Republic, Spain and France. In 2016, he was called up by Alberigo Evani to the U20s to represent the side at the 2015–16 Under-20 Four Nations Tournament.

In March 2017, Chiesa was called up by Luigi Di Biagio to the U21s for friendlies against Poland and Spain. He made his U21 debut on 23 March 2017, in a 2–1 win against Poland; Chiesa provided the assist to Lorenzo Pellegrini's opener. He retained his place in the starting line-up against Spain in a 2–1 defeat at the Stadio Olimpico.

In June 2017, Chiesa was included in the U21 squad for the 2017 UEFA European Under-21 Championship by manager Di Biagio. In Italy's opening match of the tournament on 19 June, he set-up Andrea Petagna's goal with a cross following a corner in a 2–0 win over Denmark. Italy were eliminated by Spain in the semi-finals on 27 June, following a 3–1 defeat.

Chiesa took part with the U21 team in the 2019 UEFA European Under-21 Championship held in Italy, where he scored three goals in the group stage phase.

=== Senior ===
==== Early senior career ====
Despite only being called up to the under-21 side in March 2017, Chiesa was selected by Italy's senior head coach Gian Piero Ventura for the team's unofficial friendly against San Marino in Empoli on 31 May. He made his unofficial senior international debut in the match, starting in Italy's eventual 8–0 win.

In March 2018, Chiesa was awarded his first official senior call-up to the Italy national team, under interim manager Di Biagio, for Italy's friendlies against Argentina and England later that month. On 23 March, he made his official senior international debut in the 2–0 friendly defeat against Argentina.

Chiesa's first senior international goal came on 18 November, in a 9–1 home win over Armenia, in Italy's final Euro 2020 qualifier, under manager Roberto Mancini; he also assisted two goals during the match: Ciro Immobile's first goal, and Riccardo Orsolini's goal.

==== UEFA Euro 2020 ====
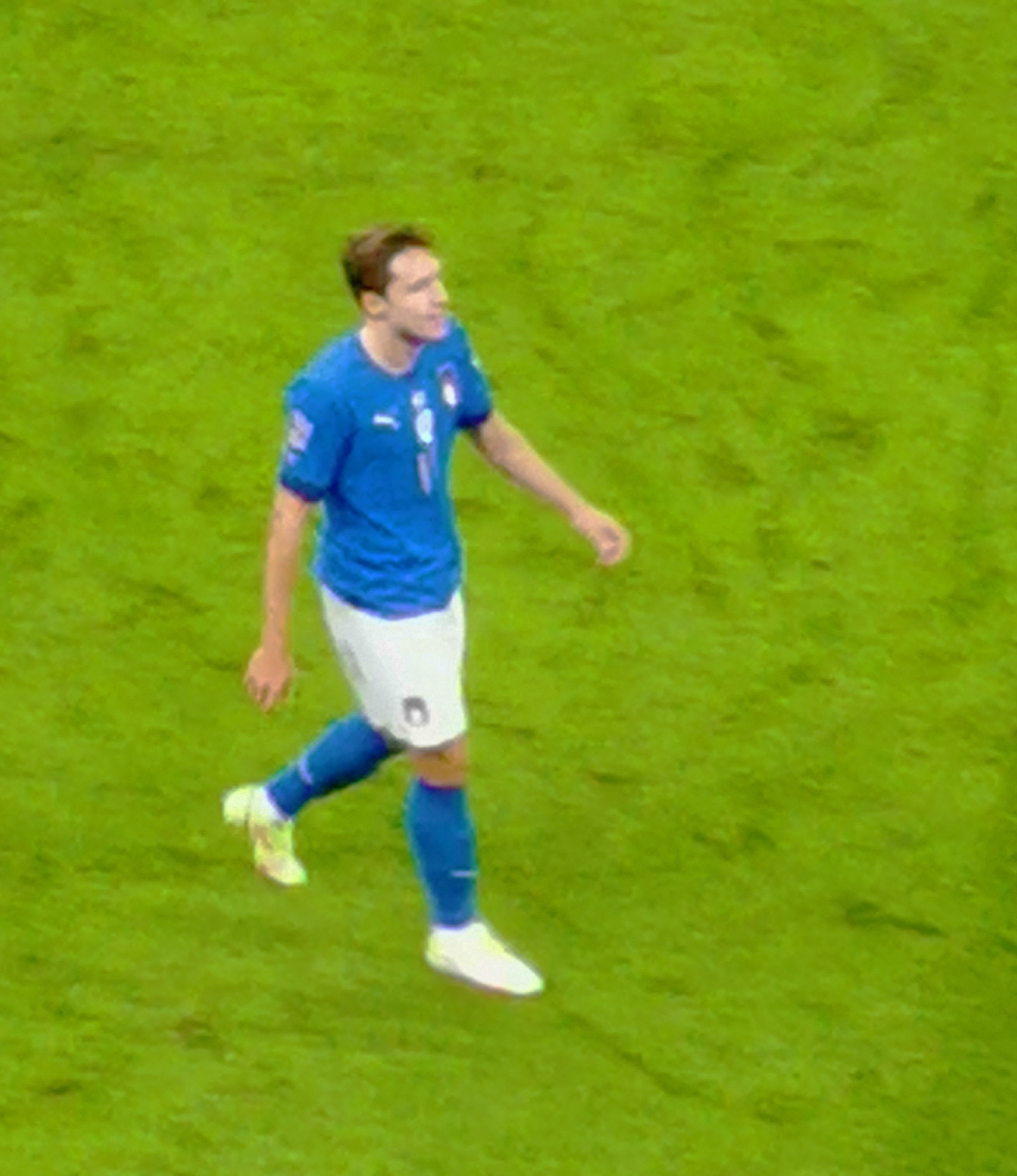
Chiesa playing for Italy in 2021

In June 2021, Chiesa was included in Italy's squad for UEFA Euro 2020. He was named Man of the Match by UEFA in Italy's final group match, a 1–0 victory over Wales in Rome on 20 June, which saw them top their group. On 26 June, he scored the opening goal in a 2–1 extra-time win over Austria in the round of 16 of the tournament at Wembley Stadium. His father Enrico had scored 25 years and 12 days earlier in Italy's second group match at UEFA Euro 1996 in England, a 2–1 loss against eventual runners-up Czech Republic; as such they became the first father and son pair to have scored a goal at the Euros.

In the semi-final against Spain on 6 July, Chiesa scored the opening goal in a 1–1 draw; a game in which Italy advanced to the final of the tournament after extra time following a 4–2 penalty shoot-out victory. For his performance, Chiesa was named Man of the Match by UEFA for the second time. On 11 July, he suffered an injury late in the second half of regulation time in the UEFA Euro 2020 Final against England at Wembley Stadium, and was subsequently replaced by Federico Bernardeschi in the 86th minute; Italy went on to win the European Championship following a 3–2 victory in a penalty shoot-out after a 1–1 draw in extra-time. For his performances throughout the competition, he was named in the "Team of the Tournament".

==== 2021 UEFA Nations League Finals ====
On 6 October, Chiesa assisted Lorenzo Pellegrini's goal in a 2–1 home defeat to Spain in the semi-finals of the 2020–21 UEFA Nations League. On 10 October, he won a penalty from which Domenico Berardi scored the match–winning goal to give Italy a 2–1 home victory over Belgium in the bronze medal match of the 2021 UEFA Nations League Finals.

==== UEFA Euro 2024 ====
Chiesa was selected in the final squad for UEFA Euro 2024 and started in three of the team's four matches in an eventual round of 16 exit from the competition.

==== 2026 FIFA World Cup qualifiers ====
In September 2025, under new Italy manager Gennaro Gattuso, Chiesa was not included in the squad for the 2026 FIFA World Cup qualifiers against Estonia and Israel. Both the player and the manager confirmed it was a mutual decision, with Chiesa stating he did not yet feel ready to return.

== Style of play ==
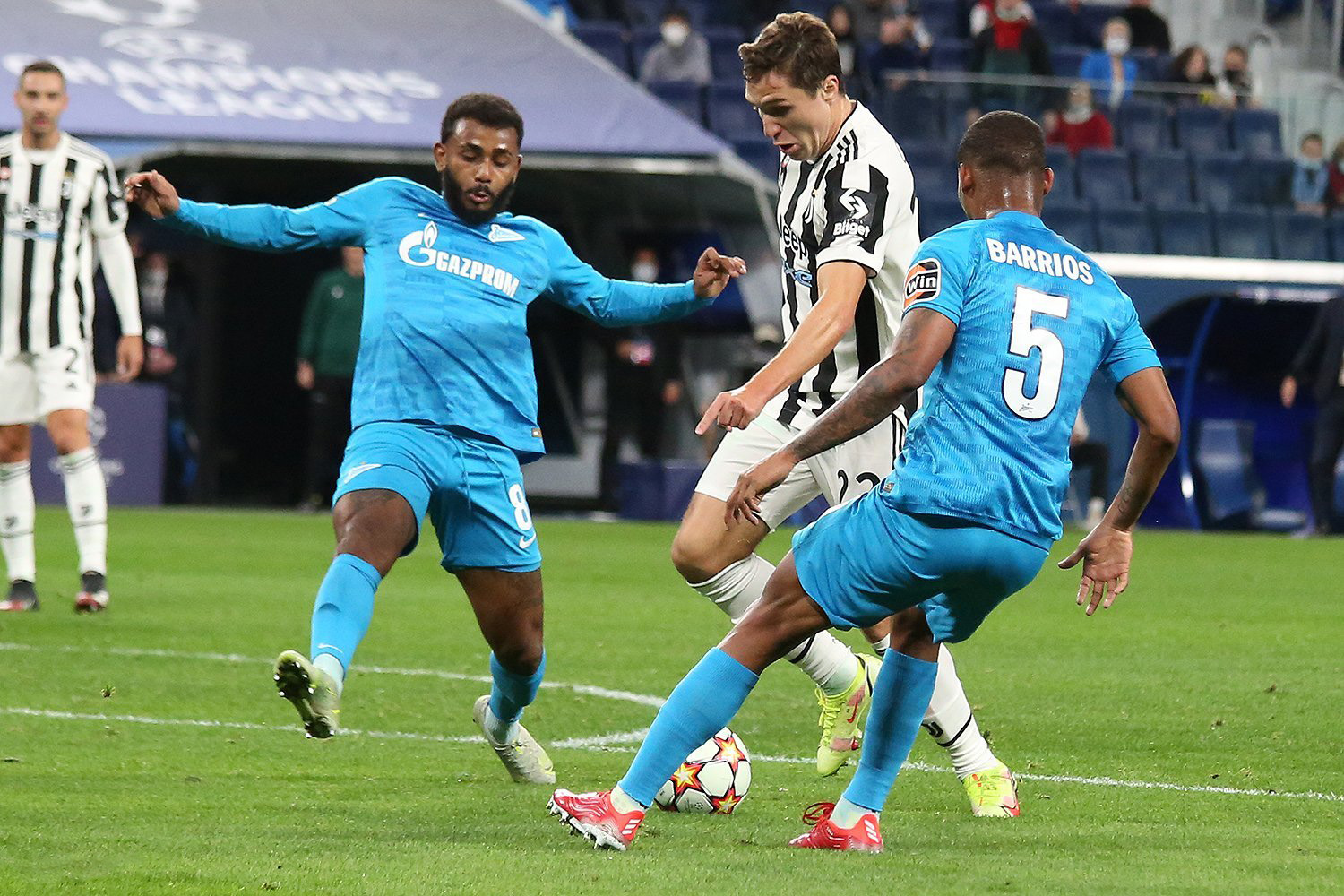
Chiesa with Juventus dribbling past Zenit Saint Petersburg defenders in 2021

Cited as having good stamina, acceleration, and dribbling skills, he usually plays as a right winger, he is also capable of playing on the left wing.

Aside from his favoured roles on either flank, Chiesa has also been deployed in several other attacking positions, given his capability of playing anywhere across the front line; he has most frequently been played in a central role as either an attacking midfielder or second striker, but has also been fielded as a main striker on occasion. He has even occasionally been used in deeper midfield roles, including as central midfielder. (Note: See) His pace and movement off the ball allow him to exploit spaces and make attacking runs to beat the defensive line and provide depth to his team.

In addition to his primary duties in attack, Chiesa is also known for his energy and work-rate, and often contributes to the defensive phase of the game by pressing opponents and chasing the opposition's wingers down the flank to win back possession, and has even occasionally been deployed as a right–sided wing back in a 3–5–2 formation. Moreover, he is highly regarded in the media for his composure, due to his penchant for scoring decisive goals in important matches. Despite his ability, however, he has often struggled with injuries throughout his career.

== Personal life ==
Chiesa was born in Genoa. His father, Enrico, was also a professional footballer; he played for various Serie A clubs, most notably Parma, Fiorentina and Siena, and represented the Italy national team. In addition to his native Italian, Chiesa also speaks English; he studied at the International School of Florence, where the bulk of instruction was conducted in English. He also spent two years at university, studying Sports Science.

On 20 July 2024, Chiesa married his long-term girlfriend Lucia Bramani.

== Career statistics ==
=== Club ===
As of match played 11 October 2026

Appearances and goals by club, season and competition
Club	Season	League			National cup (Note: Includes Coppa Italia, FA Cup)		League cup (Note: Includes EFL Cup)		Europe		Other		Total	
Club	Season	Division	Apps	Goals	Apps	Goals	Apps	Goals	Apps	Goals	Apps	Goals	Apps	Goals
Fiorentina	2016–17	Serie A	27	3	2	0	—		5 (Note: Appearances in UEFA Europa League)	1	—		34	4
Fiorentina	2017–18	Serie A	36	6	2	0	—		—		—		38	6
Fiorentina	2018–19	Serie A	37	6	4	6	—		—		—		41	12
Fiorentina	2019–20	Serie A	34	10	3	1	—		—		—		37	11
Fiorentina	2020–21	Serie A	3	1	—		—		—		—		3	1
Fiorentina	Total		137	26	11	7	—		5	1	—		153	34
Juventus (loan)	2020–21	Serie A	30	8	4	2	—		8 (Note: Appearances in UEFA Champions League)	4	1 (Note: Appearance in Supercoppa Italiana)	0	43	14
Juventus (loan)	2021–22	Serie A	14	2	0	0	—		4	2	0	0	18	4
Juventus	2022–23	Serie A	21	2	4	1	—		8 (Note: One appearance in UEFA Champions League, seven appearances and one goal in UEFA Europa League)	1	—		33	4
Juventus	2023–24	Serie A	33	9	4	1	—		—		—		37	10
Juventus	Juventus total		98	21	12	4	—		20	7	1	0	131	32
Liverpool	2024–25	Premier League	6	0	2	1	3	1	3	0	—		14	2
Liverpool	2025–26	Premier League	26	2	3	0	2	0	5	1	0	0	36	3
Liverpool	2026–27	Premier League	1	0	0	0	0	0	0	0	—		1	0
Liverpool	Total		33	2	5	1	5	1	8	1	0	0	51	5
Career total			268	49	28	12	5	1	33	9	1	0	335	71

=== International ===
As of match played 29 June 2024

Appearances and goals by national team and year
National team	Year	Apps	Goals
Italy	2018	11	0
Italy	2019	6	1
Italy	2020	4	0
Italy	2021	17	3
Italy	2022	2	0
Italy	2023	4	3
Italy	2024	7	0
Total		51	7

Italy score listed first, score column indicates score after each Chiesa goal.

List of international goals scored by Federico Chiesa
No.	Date	Venue	Cap	Opponent	Score	Result	Competition
1	18 November 2019	Stadio Renzo Barbera, Palermo, Italy	17	Armenia	9–1	9–1	UEFA Euro 2020 qualifying
2	26 June 2021	Wembley Stadium, London, England	29	Austria	1–0	2–1 (a.e.t.)	UEFA Euro 2020
3	6 July 2021	Wembley Stadium, London, England	31	Spain	1–0	1–1 (a.e.t.) (4–2 p)	UEFA Euro 2020
4	2 September 2021	Stadio Artemio Franchi, Florence, Italy	33	Bulgaria	1–0	1–1	2022 FIFA World Cup qualification
5	18 June 2023	De Grolsch Veste, Enschede, Netherlands	42	Netherlands	3–1	3–2	2023 UEFA Nations League Finals
6	17 November 2023	Stadio Olimpico, Rome, Italy	43	North Macedonia	2–0	5–2	UEFA Euro 2024 qualifying
7	17 November 2023	Stadio Olimpico, Rome, Italy	43	North Macedonia	3–0	5–2	UEFA Euro 2024 qualifying

== Honours ==
Juventus

- Coppa Italia: 2020–21, 2023–24
- Supercoppa Italiana: 2020

Liverpool

- Premier League: 2024–25
- EFL Cup runner-up: 2024–25

Italy

- UEFA European Championship: 2020
- UEFA Nations League third place: 2020–21, 2022–23

Individual

- UEFA European Championship Team of the Tournament: 2020
- Pallone Azzurro: 2021
- Serie A Team of the Year: 2020–21

Orders

- 5th Class / Knight: Cavaliere Ordine al Merito della Repubblica Italiana: 2021
