= Tòfol Montiel =

Spanish footballer

Personal information
- Full name: Cristóbal Montiel Rodríguez
- Date of birth: 11 April 2000 (age 26)
- Place of birth: Palma, Spain
- Height: 1.78 m (5 ft 10 in)
- Position: Midfielder

Team information
- Current team: Lahti
- Number: 8

Youth career
- 2008–2018: Mallorca
- 2018–2019: Fiorentina

Senior career*
Years	Team	Apps	(Gls)
2019–2022	Fiorentina	3	(0)
2020	→ Vitória de Setúbal (loan)	6	(0)
2021–2022	→ Siena (loan)	10	(1)
2022	→ Atlético Baleares (loan)	14	(0)
2022–2023	Mallorca B	28	(1)
2023–2024	Alzira	26	(2)
2024–2025	Kecskemét	10	(1)
2025–	Lahti	35	(5)
- * Club domestic league appearances and goals as of 13 November 2026

Cristóbal "Tòfol" Montiel Rodríguez (born 11 April 2000) is a Spanish professional footballer who plays as a midfielder for Finnish Veikkausliiga club Lahti.

== Club career ==
A youth product of the RCD Mallorca youth academy, ACF Fiorentina signed Montiel on 16 June 2018 after activating his €2 million release clause. Montiel made his professional debut for Fiorentina in a 1–1 Serie A tie with Torino on 31 March 2019.

On 31 January 2020, he joined Vitória de Setúbal in Portugal on loan until the end of the 2019–20 season.

On 31 August 2021, he moved on loan to Siena. On 28 January 2022, he was loaned to Spanish club Atlético Baleares.

On 15 July 2022, Montiel's contract with Fiorentina was terminated by mutual consent.

In August 2025, he signed with Finnish Ykkösliiga club Lahti.

== Personal life ==
Montiel is the son of the Spanish former footballer Óscar Montiel.
