= Bruno Gaspar =

Angolan footballer (born 1993)

Personal information
- Full name: Bruno Miguel Boialvo Gaspar
- Date of birth: 21 April 1993 (age 33)
- Place of birth: Évora, Portugal
- Height: 1.76 m (5 ft 9 in)
- Position: Right-back

Team information
- Current team: Apollon Limassol
- Number: 76

Youth career
- 2001–2005: GDR Canaviais
- 2005–2012: Benfica

Senior career*
| Years | Team | Apps | (Gls) |
| 2012–2015 | Benfica B | 37 | (1) |
| 2014–2015 | → Vitória Guimarães (loan) | 24 | (0) |
| 2014 | → Vitória Guimarães B (loan) | 1 | (0) |
| 2015–2017 | Vitória Guimarães | 56 | (0) |
| 2015 | Vitória Guimarães B | 1 | (0) |
| 2017–2018 | Fiorentina | 15 | (0) |
| 2018–2022 | Sporting CP | 16 | (1) |
| 2019–2020 | → Olympiacos (loan) | 15 | (0) |
| 2021 | → Vancouver Whitecaps FC (loan) | 17 | (1) |
| 2022–2025 | Vitória Guimarães | 48 | (2) |
| 2025– | Apollon Limassol | 34 | (2) |

International career
| 2008 | Portugal U15 | 3 | (0) |
| 2009 | Portugal U16 | 6 | (1) |
| 2010–2011 | Portugal U18 | 4 | (0) |
| 2014 | Portugal U21 | 1 | (0) |
| 2019 | Angola | 4 | (0) |
- * Club domestic league appearances and goals as of 11 October 2026

Bruno Miguel Boialvo Gaspar (born 21 April 1993) is a professional footballer who plays as a right-back for Cypriot First Division club Apollon Limassol.

After starting out at Benfica's reserves, he went on to appear in 144 Primeira Liga matches in representation of Vitória de Guimarães (two spells) and Sporting CP. He also played professionally in Italy with Fiorentina, Greece with Olympiacos and Canada with Vancouver Whitecaps FC.

Born in Portugal, Gaspar represented that country as a youth before switching to Angola at senior level. He was selected for the 2019 Africa Cup of Nations.

== Club career ==
=== Benfica ===
Born in Évora, Alto Alentejo Province, Gaspar joined S.L. Benfica's youth academy as a 12-year-old. He made his professional debut for their reserves on 6 January 2013, playing the full 90 minutes in a 1–1 away draw against C.D. Santa Clara as the visitors ended with nine players.

Gaspar scored his first goal as a senior – and in the Segunda Liga – on 15 February 2014, in a 2–0 home victory over S.C. Braga B. He finished the season with 24 appearances, helping the team finish in fifth place.

=== Vitória Guimarães ===
On 2 September 2014, Gaspar was loaned to Primeira Liga club Vitória de Guimarães. His first match in the competition occurred 12 days later, in a 1–1 home draw with FC Porto where he conceded a penalty after grabbing Yacine Brahimi in the penalty area. He, teammate Hernâni Fortes and opponent Salvador Agra were all sent off at the end of a goalless draw at Minho rivals S.C. Braga on 7 December.

For the 2015–16 campaign, the move was made permanent and the player signed a four-year contract.

=== Fiorentina ===
On 19 June 2017, Gaspar agreed to a five-year deal with ACF Fiorentina from Italy. His maiden Serie A appearance took place on 27 August, when he came on as 46th-minute substitute for Nenad Tomović and provided the assist to Milan Badelj in a 1–2 home loss against UC Sampdoria.

=== Sporting CP ===
Gaspar returned to his homeland and its capital in June 2018, signing a five-year contract with Sporting CP. He scored his only goal for the club on 3 January 2019 (with collaboration from opposing player Vincent Sasso), in a 2–1 home victory over B-SAD.

On 31 August 2019, Olympiacos F.C. announced the acquisition of Gaspar on loan. On 9 March 2021, again on loan, he joined Vancouver Whitecaps FC of Major League Soccer with a purchase option at the end of the season, which was not activated; he scored once in his year in Canada, opening a 1–1 draw at the San Jose Earthquakes on 23 October.

=== Return to Vitória ===
Gaspar returned to Vitória Guimarães on the last day of the January 2022 transfer window (alongside Geny Catamo on loan), in a deal where Marcus Edwards moved in the opposite direction.

== International career ==
=== Portugal ===
Gaspar won his only cap for the Portugal under-21 side on 13 November 2014, playing seven minutes in a 3–1 away friendly defeat against England.

=== Angola ===
On 20 May 2019, Gaspar was pre-called up by Angola for the 2019 Africa Cup of Nations, making his debut on 8 June by featuring 29 minutes in a 2–0 friendly victory over Guinea-Bissau held in Penafiel.

== Career statistics ==
As of 19 July 2020

Appearances and goals by club, season and competition
| Club | Season | League | | | National Cup | | League Cup | | Europe | | Total | |
| Club | Season | Division | Apps | Goals | Apps | Goals | Apps | Goals | Apps | Goals | Apps | Goals |
|---|---|---|---|---|---|---|---|---|---|---|---|---|
| Benfica B | 2012–13 | Segunda Liga | 10 | 0 | — | | — | | — | | 10 | 0 |
| Benfica B | 2013–14 | Segunda Liga | 24 | 1 | — | | — | | — | | 24 | 1 |
| Benfica B | 2014–15 | Segunda Liga | 3 | 0 | — | | — | | — | | 3 | 0 |
| Benfica B | Total | | 37 | 1 | — | | — | | — | | 37 | 1 |
| Vitória Guimarães | 2014–15 | Primeira Liga | 24 | 0 | 2 | 0 | 1 | 0 | — | | 27 | 0 |
| Vitória Guimarães | 2015–16 | Primeira Liga | 28 | 0 | 1 | 0 | 1 | 0 | — | | 30 | 0 |
| Vitória Guimarães | 2016–17 | Primeira Liga | 28 | 0 | 6 | 0 | 2 | 0 | — | | 36 | 0 |
| Vitória Guimarães | Total | | 80 | 0 | 9 | 0 | 4 | 0 | — | | 93 | 0 |
| Vitória Guimarães B | 2014–15 | Segunda Liga | 1 | 0 | — | | — | | — | | 1 | 0 |
| Vitória Guimarães B | 2015–16 | Liga Pro | 1 | 0 | — | | — | | — | | 1 | 0 |
| Vitória Guimarães B | Total | | 2 | 0 | 0 | 0 | 0 | 0 | — | | 2 | 0 |
| Fiorentina | 2017–18 | Serie A | 15 | 0 | 2 | 0 | — | | — | | 17 | 0 |
| Sporting CP | 2018–19 | Primeira Liga | 16 | 1 | 5 | 0 | 3 | 0 | 5 | 0 | 29 | 1 |
| Olympiacos (loan) | 2019–20 | Super League Greece | 15 | 0 | 3 | 0 | — | | 2 | 0 | 20 | 0 |
| Career total | | | 165 | 2 | 19 | 0 | 7 | 0 | 7 | 0 | 198 | 2 |

== Honours ==
Sporting CP

- Taça de Portugal: 2018–19
- Taça da Liga: 2018–19

Olympiacos

- Super League Greece: 2019–20
- Greek Football Cup: 2019–20
