= Maximiliano Olivera =

Uruguayan footballer (born 1992)

Personal information
- Full name: Maximiliano Martín Olivera de Andrea
- Date of birth: 5 March 1992 (age 34)
- Place of birth: Montevideo, Uruguay
- Height: 1.82 m (6 ft 0 in)
- Position: Left-back

Team information
- Current team: Peñarol
- Number: 15

Youth career
- 2010: Montevideo Wanderers

Senior career*
Years	Team	Apps	(Gls)
2010–2015	Montevideo Wanderers	117	(9)
2015–2016	Peñarol	15	(1)
2016–2021	Fiorentina	28	(0)
2019	→ Olimpia (loan)	14	(1)
2020	→ Juárez (loan)	20	(2)
2021–2023	Juárez	33	(1)
2023–	Peñarol	62	(6)
- * Club domestic league appearances and goals as of 1 October 2025

Maximiliano Martín Olivera de Andrea (born 5 March 1992) is a Uruguayan footballer who plays as a left-back for Peñarol.

== Club career ==
Olivera is a youth exponent from Montevideo Wanderers. He joined Peñarol in 2015. In 2016, he joined Italian side Fiorentina.

On 24 December 2018, Fiorentina announced he has been loaned to Olimpia in Paraguay.

On 5 February 2020, he joined Juárez in Mexico on loan.

On 19 July 2021, he returned to Juárez on a permanent basis.

== Career statistics ==
As of match played 22 May 2021

Appearances and goals by club, season and competition
Club	Season	League			National Cup		Continental		Other		Total	
Club	Season	Division	Apps	Goals	Apps	Goals	Apps	Goals	Apps	Goals	Apps	Goals
Montevideo	2010–11	Primera División	6	0	0	0	—		—		6	0
Montevideo	2011–12	Primera División	16	0	0	0	—		—		16	0
Montevideo	2012–13	Primera División	26	3	0	0	2	0	—		28	3
Montevideo	2013–14	Primera División	28	3	0	0	—		3	0	31	3
Montevideo	2014–15	Primera División	23	2	0	0	8	1	—		31	3
Montevideo	2015–16	Primera División	14	1	0	0	—		—		14	1
Montevideo	Total		113	9	0	0	10	1	3	0	126	10
Peñarol	2015–16	Primera División	13	0	0	0	7	0	1	1	21	1
Peñarol	2017	Primera División	1	0	0	0	—		—		1	0
Peñarol	Total		14	0	0	0	7	0	1	1	22	1
Fiorentina	2016–17	Serie A	18	0	2	0	6	0	—		26	0
Fiorentina	2017–18	Serie A	7	0	0	0	—		—		7	0
Fiorentina	2019–20	Serie A	1	0	0	0	—		—		1	0
Fiorentina	2020–21	Serie A	2	0	0	0	—		—		2	0
Fiorentina	Total		28	0	2	0	6	0	0	0	36	0
Olimpia (loan)	2019	Primera División	14	1	0	0	4	0	—		18	1
Juárez (loan)	2019–20	Liga MX	6	1	2	0	0	0	—		8	1
Juárez (loan)	2020–21	Liga MX	14	1	0	0	0	0	—		14	1
Juárez (loan)	Total		20	2	2	0	0	0	0	0	22	2
Career total			189	12	4	0	27	1	4	1	224	14
