= Petko Hristov =

Bulgarian footballer (born 1999)

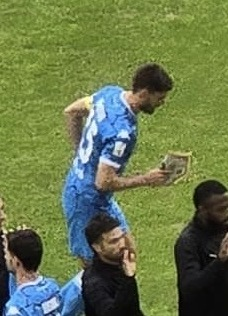
- Hristov with Spezia in 2024

Personal information
- Full name: Petko Rosenov Hristov
- Date of birth: 1 March 1999 (age 27)
- Place of birth: Sofia, Bulgaria
- Height: 1.91 m (6 ft 3 in)
- Position: Centre-back

Team information
- Current team: PFC CSKA SOFIA SOFIA (on loan from Spezia)
- Number: 55

Youth career
- 2008–2013: PFC CSKA SOFIA
- 2013–2016: Slavia Sofia
- 2017–2018: Fiorentina

Senior career*
| Years | Team | Apps | (Gls) |
| 2016–2017 | Slavia Sofia | 26 | (1) |
| 2017–2021 | Fiorentina | 0 | (0) |
| 2018–2019 | → Ternana (loan) | 13 | (1) |
| 2019–2020 | → Bisceglie (loan) | 25 | (0) |
| 2020–2021 | → Pro Vercelli (loan) | 33 | (2) |
| 2021– | Spezia | 107 | (6) |
| 2023 | → Venezia (loan) | 11 | (0) |
| 2026– | → Levski Sofia (loan) | 0 | (0) |

International career^{‡}
| 2015–2016 | Bulgaria U17 | 14 | (0) |
| 2016–2018 | Bulgaria U19 | 15 | (0) |
| 2017–2020 | Bulgaria U21 | 18 | (0) |
| 2021– | Bulgaria | 22 | (0) |
- * Club domestic league appearances and goals as of 13 May 2026 ‡ National team caps and goals as of 17:12, 30 March 2026 (UTC)

Petko Rosenov Hristov (Bulgarian: Петко Росенов Христов; born 1 March 1999) is a Bulgarian professional footballer who plays as a centre-back for First League club Levski Sofia, on loan from Spezia, and the Bulgaria national team.

== Career ==
=== Slavia Sofia ===
Hristov started his career in Levski Sofia, before relocating to Slavia Sofia in 2013. He made his senior debut for Slavia in a match of the Europa League against Polish club Zagłębie Lubin on 30 June 2016, coming on as a substitute for Georgi Yomov. A month later he made his Bulgarian First League debut in the opening game of the season against CSKA Sofia. He scored his first goal on 10 September in a 5–2 home win over Lokomotiv Plovdiv. On 1 October Petko was joined by his twin brother Andrea Hristov in the central defense for the very first time against Vereya in the starting line-up.

On 3 April 2017, Hristov signed his first professional contract with the club until 31 July 2020.

=== Fiorentina ===
On 17 July 2017, Fiorentina confirmed they had signed Hristov on a five-year contract after Firenze Viola, Fiorentina owner, himself liked the player after seeing him in action at the European Under-19 Championship. On 20 August 2017, he was on the bench for the first time in the Serie A match against Inter Milan. He made his unofficial debut for the club against Real Madrid on 24 August coming on as a substitute in added time for the Trofeo Bernabeu game.

==== Ternana (loan) ====
On 16 August 2018, Hristov joined Serie C club Ternana on loan until 30 June 2019. He scored his first goal for the club on 4 December 2018 in a league match against Rimini won by Ternana by 3:0.

==== Bisceglie (loan) ====
On 9 August 2019, Hristov joined Serie C club Bisceglie on loan until 30 June 2020.

==== Pro Vercelli (loan) ====
On 18 September 2020, Hristov joined Serie C club Pro Vercelli on loan until 30 June 2021.

=== Spezia ===
After his good performance for Pro Vercelli in Serie C, on 5 July 2021 Hristov moved to Serie A team Spezia, signing a contract until 2025. He made his debut for the team on 13 August in a Coppa Italia match against Pordenone and completed his Serie A debut on 23 August in a match against Cagliari.

==== Venezia (loan) ====
On 26 January 2023, Hristov was loaned to Venezia for the rest of the 2022–23 season.

== International career ==
=== Youth levels ===
Hristov was called up for the Bulgaria U19 team for the 2017 European Under-19 Championship qualification from 22 to 27 March 2017. After a draw and 2 wins the team qualified for the knockout phase which was held in July 2017. Petkov played in all 3 matches from the group stage when Bulgaria were eliminated.

On 5 September 2017, he made his debut for the Bulgaria U21 in a match against Luxembourg U21.

=== Senior team ===
He made his debut for the Bulgaria national football team on 31 March 2021 in a World Cup qualifier against Northern Ireland. His twin brother Andrea made his debut in the same game as well.

== Personal life ==
Petko Hristov has a twin brother, Andrea, who is also a professional footballer.

== Career statistics ==
=== Club ===
As of 30 September 2025

| Club | Season | League | | | Cup | | Continental | | Other | | Total | |
| Club | Season | Division | Apps | Goals | Apps | Goals | Apps | Goals | Apps | Goals | Apps | Goals |
|---|---|---|---|---|---|---|---|---|---|---|---|---|
| Slavia Sofia | First League | 2016–17 | 25 | 1 | 0 | 0 | 1 | 0 | 4 (Note: Relegation Play-offs) | 0 | 30 | 1 |
| Slavia Sofia | First League | 2017–18 | 1 | 0 | – | | – | | – | | 1 | 0 |
| Slavia Sofia | Total | | 26 | 1 | 0 | 0 | 1 | 0 | 4 | 0 | 31 | 1 |
| Fiorentina | Serie A | 2017–18 | 0 | 0 | 0 | 0 | – | | – | | 0 | 0 |
| Ternana (loan) | Serie C | 2018–19 | 13 | 1 | 1 (Note: Appearances in Coppa Italia Serie C) | 0 | – | | – | | 14 | 1 |
| Bisceglie (loan) | Serie C | 2019–20 | 25 | 0 | 0 | 0 | – | | – | | 25 | 0 |
| Pro Vercelli (loan) | Serie C | 2020–21 | 33 | 2 | 0 | 0 | – | | 3 (Note: Appearances in Serie B – Promotion play-offs) | 0 | 36 | 2 |
| Spezia | Serie A | 2021–22 | 17 | 1 | 2 | 0 | – | | – | | 19 | 1 |
| Spezia | Serie A | 2022–23 | 9 | 0 | 2 | 0 | – | | – | | 11 | 0 |
| Spezia | Serie B | 2023–24 | 19 | 3 | 1 | 0 | – | | – | | 20 | 3 |
| Spezia | Serie B | 2024–25 | 34 | 2 | 1 | 0 | – | | 4 | 0 | 39 | 2 |
| Spezia | Serie B | 2025–26 | 6 | 0 | 1 | 0 | – | | – | | 7 | 0 |
| Spezia | Total | | 85 | 6 | 7 | 0 | 0 | 0 | 4 | 0 | 96 | 6 |
| Venezia (loan) | Serie B | 2022–23 | 11 | 0 | – | | – | | 1 | 0 | 12 | 1 |
| Career total | | | 193 | 10 | 8 | 0 | 1 | 0 | 12 | 0 | 214 | 10 |

=== International ===
As of match played 30 March 2026

Appearances and goals by national team and year
| National team | Year | Apps | Goals |
|---|---|---|---|
| Bulgaria | 2021 | 9 | 0 |
| Bulgaria | 2022 | 8 | 0 |
| Bulgaria | 2023 | 2 | 0 |
| Bulgaria | 2025 | 2 | 0 |
| Bulgaria | 2026 | 1 | 0 |
| Total | | 22 | 0 |

== Style of play ==
Hristov was described from the Italian media as a physically strong defender with great air abilities and being able to read the game which has led him to be compared to legendary Brazilian defender Thiago Silva.

== Awards ==
=== Individual ===
- Bulgarian Youth Footballer of the Year (1): 2016
