= Vincent Laurini =

Italian–French footballer (born 1989)

Personal information
- Full name: Vincent Alain Laurini
- Date of birth: 10 June 1989 (age 37)
- Place of birth: Thionville, France
- Height: 1.73 m (5 ft 8 in)
- Position: Full-back

Youth career
- Sedan

Senior career*
Years	Team	Apps	(Gls)
2008–2010	Fossombrone	54	(2)
2010–2012	Carpi	57	(0)
2012–2018	Empoli	120	(1)
2017–2018	→ Fiorentina (loan)	22	(0)
2018–2019	Fiorentina	15	(0)
2019–2022	Parma	29	(0)
- * Club domestic league appearances and goals as of 28 August 2022

Vincent Alain Laurini (born 10 June 1989) is a French professional footballer who plays as a full-back.

== Career ==
Laurini was born in Thionville, France, to parents from Italy. He was a player of Sedan.

In 2008, he left for Italian amateur club Fossombrone, where he won Eccellenza Marche and promoted. In 2010, he was signed by Carpi, winning group B of 2010–11 Lega Pro Seconda Divisione. In July 2011, he signed a new five-year contract. On 13 July 2012, he was sold to Serie B club Empoli in a co-ownership deal, wherein then he signed a four-year contract. He wore the number 2 shirt for his new club.

On 20 June 2013, the co-ownership was renewed.

On 8 July 2019, Laurini signed to Parma until 2022.

== Honours ==
Carpi

- Lega Pro Seconda Divisione: 2011

Fossombrone

- Eccellenza Marche: 2009
