= Jaime Báez =

Uruguayan footballer (born 1995)

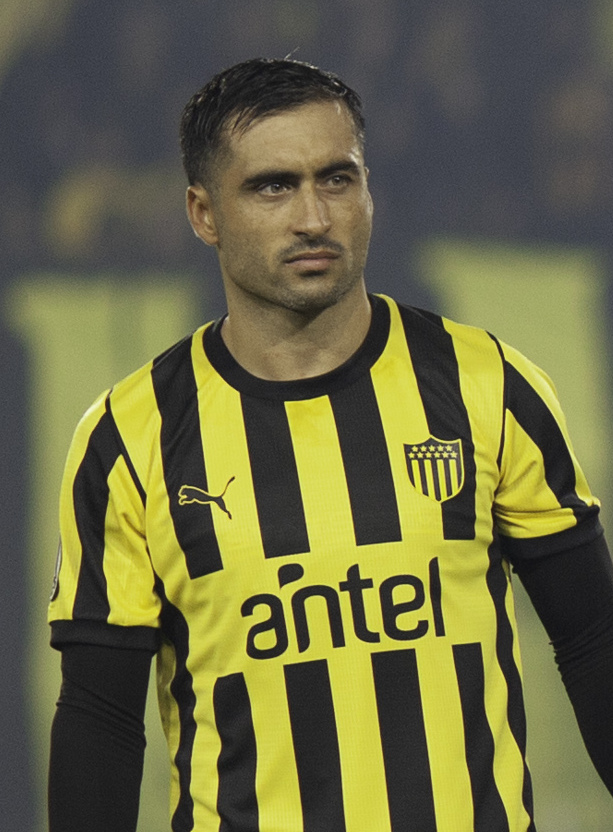
- Báez with Peñarol in 2024

Personal information
- Full name: Jaime Báez Stábile
- Date of birth: 25 April 1995 (age 31)
- Place of birth: Montevideo, Uruguay
- Height: 1.78 m (5 ft 10 in)
- Position: Winger

Team information
- Current team: Latina

Youth career
- Canelones
- Juventud

Senior career*
Years	Team	Apps	(Gls)
2012–2015	Juventud	68	(16)
2015	→ Defensor Sporting (loan)	6	(1)
2015–2019	Fiorentina	0	(0)
2016	→ Livorno (loan)	13	(0)
2016–2017	→ Spezia (loan)	24	(1)
2017–2018	→ Pescara (loan)	14	(0)
2018–2019	→ Cosenza (loan)	25	(1)
2019–2021	Cosenza	54	(7)
2021–2023	Cremonese	54	(5)
2023–2024	Frosinone	28	(2)
2024–2025	Peñarol	28	(4)
2026	Cosenza	10	(1)
2026–	Latina	0	(0)

International career
2014–2015	Uruguay U20	23	(2)
Medal record
Men's football
Representing Uruguay
South American U-20 Championship
Third place	2015 Uruguay
- * Club domestic league appearances and goals as of 1 May 2026

Jaime Báez Stábile (born 25 April 1995) is a Uruguayan professional footballer who plays as a winger for Italian Serie C Group B club Latina.

== Club career ==
Born in Montevideo, Báez started his career playing with Juventud. He made his professional debut during the 2012–13 season.

On 9 August 2018, Báez joined to Serie B club Cosenza on loan until 30 June 2019.

On 2 August 2019, he moved to Cosenza on a permanent basis, signing a three-year contract.

On 29 January 2021, Báez signed with Serie B club Cremonese.

On 13 January 2023, he moved to Frosinone.

== Honours ==
Peñarol

- Uruguayan Primera División: 2024
