= Sebastián Cristóforo =

Uruguayan footballer (born 1993)

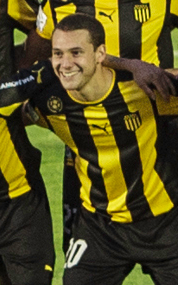
- Cristóforo with Peñarol in 2013

Personal information
- Full name: Sebastián Carlos Cristóforo Pepe
- Date of birth: 23 August 1993 (age 33)
- Place of birth: Montevideo, Uruguay
- Height: 1.72 m (5 ft 8 in)
- Position: Midfielder

Team information
- Current team: Cerro
- Number: 41

Youth career
- Peñarol

Senior career*
Years	Team	Apps	(Gls)
2011–2013	Peñarol	45	(1)
2013–2017	Sevilla	33	(0)
2016–2017	→ Fiorentina (loan)	19	(0)
2017–2020	Fiorentina	8	(0)
2018–2019	→ Getafe (loan)	15	(0)
2020	→ Eibar (loan)	18	(0)
2020–2021	Girona	37	(0)
2022	Cartagena	14	(0)
2022–2025	Peñarol	53	(1)
2025	Central Córdoba SdE	15	(0)
2026–	Cerro	5	(0)

International career
2012–2013	Uruguay U20	31	(0)
2012	Uruguay U23	1	(0)
Medal record
Representing Uruguay
Men's Football
FIFA U-20 World Cup
Runner-up	2013 Turkey
South American U-20 Championship
Third place	2013 Argentina
- * Club domestic league appearances and goals as of 21 June 2026

Sebastián Carlos Cristóforo Pepe (born 23 August 1993) is a Uruguayan professional footballer who plays as a midfielder for Uruguayan Primera División club Cerro.

== Club career ==
Born in Montevideo, Cristóforo graduated in Peñarol's youth setup, being promoted by his coach Diego Aguirre in May 2011, due to club's obligations in 2011 Copa Libertadores. He made his professional debut on 29 May 2011, in a 2–2 home draw against Central Español.

Cristóforo scored his first professional goal on 29 February 2012, the last of a 4–1 home routing over Bella Vista. He soon earned a starting spot in the club, being a part of the team who won the 2012–13 season.

On 11 August 2013, Cristóforo signed a five-year contract with Sevilla FC. He made his La Liga debut on 14 September, starting in a 2–3 away loss against FC Barcelona. Cristóforo finished the campaign with 12 appearances, suffering a severe knee injury in March 2014.

On 27 August 2016, Cristóforo was loaned to ACF Fiorentina for one year, with a buyout clause. He signed permanently for the side in the following year, after 19 league matches.

On 31 August 2018, Cristóforo returned to Spain by signing with Getafe CF on a season-long loan. On 11 January 2020, he joined SD Eibar on loan with an obligation to purchase.

On 5 October 2020, Cristóforo signed a one-year contract for Segunda División side Girona FC. On 15 January 2022, after spending six months as a free agent, he signed a short-term deal with FC Cartagena, still in the Spanish second division.

On 16 July 2022, Peñarol announced the return of Cristóforo on a permanent deal until December 2023.

On 14 January 2025, Cristóforo joined Argentine Primera División club Central Córdoba SdE.

== International career ==
In 2013 Cristóforo appeared with the under-20s in the year's FIFA U-20 World Cup in Turkey, being an important midfield unit as his country finished second.

== Honours ==
Peñarol

- Uruguayan First Division: 2012–13, 2024
- Copa Libertadores runner-up: 2011

Sevilla

- UEFA Europa League: 2013–14, 2014–15, 2015–16
