= Martin Graiciar =

Czech footballer

Personal information
- Date of birth: 11 April 1999 (age 27)
- Place of birth: Karlovy Vary, Czech Republic
- Height: 1.84 m (6 ft 0 in)
- Position: Forward

Youth career
- Sparta Prague
- Plzeň
- 2015–2016: → Arsenal (loan)
- 2017: Fiorentina

Senior career*
Years	Team	Apps	(Gls)
2017–2021	Fiorentina	0	(0)
2017–2018	→ Liberec (loan)	18	(4)
2019–2020	→ Sparta Prague (loan)	8	(0)
2020–2021	→ Mladá Boleslav (loan)	6	(0)
2022	York United	0	(0)

International career
2014	Czech Republic U16	2	(1)
2015	Czech Republic U17	5	(4)
2016–2017	Czech Republic U18	8	(2)
2017	Czech Republic U19	11	(3)
2019	Czech Republic U21	5	(1)
- * Club domestic league appearances and goals as of 7 January 2022

Martin Graiciar (born 11 April 1999) is a Czech professional footballer who last played as a forward for Canadian club York United.

== Career ==
Graiciar spent time on loan at Arsenal's youth setup. He went on loan to Liberec from Fiorentina in January 2017. He made his senior league debut for Liberec on 11 March 2017 in a Czech First League 1–0 loss at Plzeň. He scored his first league goals on 19 August in Liberec's 3–0 away win at Mladá Boleslav, when he scored twice.

On 9 July 2019, Graiciar joined to his former club Sparta Prague on loan with an option to buy.

On 7 January 2022, Graiciar signed a two-year contract with Canadian Premier League side York United, with a club option for a further year. However, he suffered an injury in preseason and never appeared for the club, with him and the club ultimately opting to mutually terminate the contract.
