= Marco Meli =

Italian footballer

Personal information
- Date of birth: 2 February 2000 (age 26)
- Place of birth: Pontedera, Italy
- Height: 1.85 m (6 ft 1 in)
- Position: Attacking midfielder

Team information
- Current team: Cerignola

Youth career
- –2007: Tau Calcio
- 2007–2019: Fiorentina

Senior career*
Years	Team	Apps	(Gls)
2019–2021	Fiorentina	0	(0)
2019–2020	→ Gubbio (loan)	13	(0)
2020–2021	→ Ravenna (loan)	12	(0)
2021–2023	Siena	49	(2)
2023–2026	Juve Stabia	55	(4)
2025–2026	→ Arezzo (loan)	7	(0)
2026	→ Crotone (loan)	10	(0)
2026–	Cerignola	0	(0)

International career^{‡}
2015	Italy U15	4	(1)
2018	Italy U18	1	(0)
- * Club domestic league appearances and goals as of 26 April 2026 ‡ National team caps and goals as of 7 February 2018

Marco Meli (born 2 February 2000) is an Italian footballer who plays as an attacking midfielder for Serie C Group C club Cerignola.

== Club career ==
=== Fiorentina ===
He is a product of Fiorentina youth teams and started playing for their Under-19 squad in the 2017–18 season. He has not been called up to the senior squad in 2017–18 or 2018–19.

==== Loan to Gubbio ====
On 1 August 2019 he joined Serie C club Gubbio on loan.

He made his professional Serie C debut for Gubbio on 1 September 2019 in a game against Virtus Verona. He substituted Mattia El Hilali in the 88th minute. He made his first starting lineup appearance on 8 September 2019 against Arzignano and was substituted at half-time.

==== Loan to Ravenna ====
On 6 September 2020 he was loaned to Ravenna.

== International career ==
He was first called up to represent Italy in 2015 for Under-15 squad friendlies.

He also appeared on the Under-18 squad.
