= 2010–11 S.L. Benfica season =

Benfica
2010–11 season
- President: Luís Filipe Vieira
- Manager: Jorge Jesus
- Stadium: Estádio da Luz
- Primeira Liga: 2nd
- Taça de Portugal: Semi-finals
- Taça da Liga: Winners
- Supertaça Cândido de Oliveira: Runners-up
- UEFA Champions League: Group stage
- UEFA Europa League: Semi-finals
- Top goalscorer: League: Óscar Cardozo (12); All: Óscar Cardozo (23)
- Highest home attendance: 60,026 v PSV Eindhoven (7 April 2011)
- Lowest home attendance: 14,897 v Olhanense (19 January 2011)
- Average home league attendance: 38,146
- Biggest win: Benfica 5–0 Olhanense (12 January 2011)
- Biggest defeat: Porto 5–0 Benfica (7 November 2010)
Home colours	Away colours	Third colours

The 2010–11 season was Sport Lisboa e Benfica's 107th season in existence and the club's 77th consecutive season in the top flight of Portuguese football. It involved Benfica competing in the Primeira Liga, Taça de Portugal, Taça da Liga and the group stage of the UEFA Champions League. Benfica qualified for the Champions League by winning the previous Primeira Liga.

In Jesus' second season, the loss of Ángel Di María and Ramires was devastating to the team. He moved Carlos Martins to the right wing as a substitute to Ramires. Nicolás Gaitán freshly landed in Europe to replace Di María. These changes had the immediate effect of breaking the high-pressure, high-tempo football of the previous years. By late September, Benfica was already trailing nine points from Porto, a difference it never recovered.

In December 2010, Eduardo Salvio replaced Carlos Martins and Benfica changed to a more common 4–4–2 formation, with two out-and-out wingers to provide width, a pure attacking midfielder combined with a defensive midfielder. That decision left to a good winning streak and Jesus surpassed the record held by Jimmy Hagan's 1972–73 team, with 16 consecutive wins, including a 2–0 win at VfB Stuttgart for the season's Europa League (4–1 on aggregate), Benfica's first ever victory in Germany. As fatigue started to influence the most used players, in the only competitions the club were actively competing, Benfica was unable to maintain a 2–0 lead against Porto, and lost the chance to go the Portuguese Cup final. A 1–0 loss in Braga prevented Benfica from reaching the Europa League final. Domestically, Benfica won their third League Cup, beating Paços de Ferreira.

In January, the Portuguese winter transfer record fee was broken when David Luiz went to Chelsea for £21 million. The record was later surpassed on 31 January 2014 by another Benfica player, when Rodrigo's economic rights were sold to an investment firm for €30 million.

== Competitions ==
Win Draw Loss Postponed

=== Pre-season ===
10 July 2010 Friendly	Monthey	0–3	Benfica	Monthey, Switzerland
19:45 CET (UTC+01)			Menezes 26' (pen.); Weldon 41'; Saviola 87'	Stadium: Stade Philippe Pottier; Referee: Damien Carrel

11 July 2010 Friendly	Sion	2–1	Benfica	Sion, Switzerland
17:15 CET (UTC+01)	Mpenza 4'; Prijović 81'		Aimar 64'	Stadium: Stade Tourbillon; Referee: Maurice Gremaud

13 July 2010 Friendly	Benfica	4–1	Aris	Nyon, Switzerland
19:30 CET (UTC+01)	Aimar 17'; Saviola 52'; Alan Kardec 65'; Jara 84'		Cesarec 25'	Stadium: Centre sportif de Colovray Nyon

17 July 2010 Guimarães Trophy	Benfica	3–3 (3–4 p)	Groningen	Guimarães, Portugal
19:30 CET (UTC+01)	Alan Kardec 6'; Martins 58'; Nuno Gomes 78'		Pedersen 3'; Metaj 75'; Stenman 89'	Stadium: Estádio D. Afonso Henriques; Referee: Augusto Costa
	Penalties
	Menezes (penalty missed); David Luiz (penalty missed); Aimar (penalty scored); Saviola (penalty scored); Nuno Gomes (penalty scored)		Rijsdijk (penalty scored); Kunst (penalty scored); Tadić (penalty missed); Stenman (penalty scored); Veldmate (penalty scored)

18 July 2010 Guimarães Trophy	Vitória de Guimarães	3–5	Benfica	Guimarães, Portugal
19:30 CET (UTC+01)	Valdomiro 33', 90'; Douglas 61'		Alan Kardec 6', 48'; Saviola 9'; Jara 54'; Martins 69'	Stadium: Estádio D. Afonso Henriques; Referee: Ricardo Maia

24 July 2010 Friendly	Benfica	3–2	Monaco	Lisbon, Portugal
19:00 CET (UTC+01)	Airton 30'; Aimar 50'; Cardozo 62'		Sagbo 42'; Mongongu 45' (pen.)	Stadium: Estádio da Luz; Referee: Bruno Paixão

27 July 2010 Friendly	Benfica	2–0	Sunderland	Albufeira, Portugal
19:30 CET (UTC+01)	Cardozo 29'; Martins 89'			Stadium: Municipal de Albufeira; Referee: Hugo Miguel

30 July 2010 Guadiana Trophy	Benfica	4–1 (5–4 p)	Feyenoord	Vila Real de Santo António, Portugal
19:30 CET (UTC+01)	Cardozo 50', 72'; Menezes 75'; Amorim 85'		Smolov 3'	Stadium: Complexo Desportivo de Vila Real de Santo; Referee: Duarte Gomes
	Penalties
	Cardozo (penalty scored); Menezes (penalty scored); Amorim (penalty scored); David Luiz (penalty scored); Coentrão (penalty scored)		Vlaar (penalty missed); Fernández (penalty scored); De Cler (penalty scored); Wijnaldum (penalty scored); Fer (penalty scored)

1 August 2010 Guadiana Trophy	Benfica	4–1	Aston Villa	Vila Real de Santo António, Portugal
19:30 CET (UTC+01)	David Luiz 10'; Saviola 37', 50'; Cardozo 43'		Carew 68'	Stadium: Complexo Desportivo de Vila Real de Santo; Referee: João Capela

3 August 2010 Eusébio Cup	Benfica	0–1	Tottenham	Lisbon, Portugal
19:00 WEST (UTC+01:00)			Bale 55'	Stadium: Estádio da Luz; Attendance: 30,215; Referee: Pedro Proença

=== Supertaça Cândido de Oliveira ===
7 August 2010	Porto	2–0	Benfica	Aveiro
20:45 CET (UTC+01)	Rolando 3'; Falcao 67'			Stadium: Estádio Municipal de Aveiro; Attendance: 28,000; Referee: João Ferreira

=== Primeira Liga ===
==== League table ====
Pos	Team	Pld	W	D	L	GF	GA	GD	Pts	Qualification or relegation
1	Porto (C)	30	27	3	0	73	16	+57	84	Qualification to Champions League group stage
2	Benfica	30	20	3	7	61	31	+30	63	Qualification to Champions League third qualifying round
3	Sporting CP	30	13	9	8	41	31	+10	48	Qualification to Europa League play-off round
4	Braga	30	13	7	10	45	33	+12	46	Qualification to Europa League play-off round
5	Vitória de Guimarães	30	12	7	11	36	37	−1	43	Qualification to Europa League third qualifying round

Source: LPFP (in Portuguese)
Rules for classification: 1) Points; 2) Head-to-head points; 3) Head-to-head goal difference; 4) Head-to-head away goals scored; 5) Goal difference; 6) Matches won; 7) Goals scored; 8) Play-off.
(Note: LPFP decided that only criteria 1, 5, 6 and 7 would be applied to establish the classification during the competition.)
(C) Champions

==== Results by round ====
Round	1	2	3	4	5	6	7	8	9	10	11	12	13	14	15	16	17	18	19	20	21	22	23	24	25	26	27	28	29	30
Ground	H	A	H	A	H	A	H	A	H	A	H	A	H	H	A	A	H	A	H	A	H	A	H	A	H	A	H	A	A	H
Result	L	L	W	L	W	W	W	W	W	L	W	W	W	W	W	W	W	W	W	W	W	L	D	W	L	L	W	D	W	D
Position	11	14	11	13	8	5	2	2	2	3	2	2	2	2	2	2	2	2	2	2	2	2	2	2	2	2	2	2	2	2

Source: ForaDeJogo.net
A = Away; H = Home; W = Win; D = Draw; L = Loss

==== Matches ====
15 August 2010 1	Benfica	1–2	Académica de Coimbra	Lisbon
20:15 CET (UTC+01)	Jara 62'		Fidalgo 26'; Laionel 90'	Stadium: Estádio da Luz; Attendance: 48,905; Referee: Cosme Machado

21 August 2010 2	Nacional	2–1	Benfica	Funchal
21:15 CET (UTC+01)	Luís Alberto 51'; Sá 66'		Martins 90'	Stadium: Estádio da Madeira; Attendance: 4,566; Referee: Pedro Proença

28 August 2010 3	Benfica	3–0	Vitória de Setúbal	Lisbon
21:15 CET (UTC+01)	Cardozo 4'; Luisão 44'; Aimar 56'			Stadium: Estádio da Luz; Attendance: 36,975; Referee: Vasco Santos

10 September 2010 4	Vitória de Guimarães	2–1	Benfica	Guimarães
20:15 CET (UTC+01)	Silva 17'; Rui Miguel 83'		Saviola 32'	Stadium: Estádio D. Afonso Henriques; Attendance: 17,730; Referee: Olegário Benquerença

19 September 2010 5	Benfica	2–0	Sporting CP	Lisbon
20:15 CET (UTC+01)	Cardozo 13', 50'			Stadium: Estádio da Luz; Attendance: 51,899; Referee: Carlos Xistra

25 September 2010 6	Marítimo	0–1	Benfica	Funchal
19:15 CET (UTC+01)			Coentrão 58'	Stadium: Estádio dos Barreiros; Attendance: 4,200; Referee: João Capela

3 October 2010 7	Benfica	1–0	Braga	Lisbon
20:15 CET (UTC+01)	Martins 73'			Stadium: Estádio da Luz; Attendance: 43,417; Referee: Duarte Gomes

24 October 2010 8	Portimonense	0–1	Benfica	Faro
20:15 CET (UTC+01)			García 49'	Stadium: Estádio do Algarve; Attendance: 12,373; Referee: Hugo Miguel

29 October 2010 9	Benfica	2–0	Paços de Ferreira	Lisbon
20:15 CET (UTC+01)	Aimar 14'; Alan Kardec 65'			Stadium: Estádio da Luz; Attendance: 29,529; Referee: Bruno Esteves

7 November 2010 10	Porto	5–0	Benfica	Porto
20:15 CET (UTC+01)	Varela 12'; Falcao 25', 29'; Hulk 81' (pen.), 90+1'			Stadium: Estádio do Dragão; Attendance: 49,817; Referee: Pedro Proença

14 November 2010 11	Benfica	4–0	Naval 1º de Maio	Lisbon
18:15 CET (UTC+01)	Alan Kardec 10'; Gaitán 47', 62'; Nuno Gomes 89'			Stadium: Estádio da Luz; Attendance: 31,143; Referee: Vasco Santos

28 November 2010 12	Beira-Mar	1–3	Benfica	Aveiro
18:15 CET (UTC+01)	Varela 85'		Cardozo 45', 59'; Saviola 66'	Stadium: Estádio Municipal de Aveiro; Attendance: 15,466; Referee: Bruno Paixão

3 December 2010 13	Benfica	2–0	Olhanense	Lisbon
20:15 CET (UTC+01)	Cardozo 42'; Saviola 81'			Stadium: Estádio da Luz; Attendance: 25,984; Referee: Marco Ferreira

18 December 2010 14	Benfica	5–2	Rio Ave	Lisbon
17:00 CET (UTC+01)	Aimar 5'; Saviola 8', 52'; Salvio 62', 73'		Tomás 42', 71' (pen.)	Stadium: Estádio da Luz; Attendance: 38,456; Referee: Hugo Miguel

9 January 2011 15	União de Leiria	0–3	Benfica	Leiria
20:15 CET (UTC+01)			Saviola 27'; Gaitán 80'; Cardozo 90'	Stadium: Estádio Dr. Magalhães Pessoa; Attendance: 12,506; Referee: Duarte Gomes

16 January 2011 16	Académica de Coimbra	0–1	Benfica	Coimbra
20:15 CET (UTC+01)			Saviola 19'	Stadium: Estádio Cidade de Coimbra; Attendance: 13,264; Referee: Elmano Santos

22 January 2011 17	Benfica	4–2	Nacional	Lisbon
21:15 CET (UTC+01)	Gaitán 8'; Sidnei 20'; Cardozo 51'; Jara 89'		Luís Alberto 76'; Mihelič 85'	Stadium: Estádio da Luz; Attendance: 31,255; Referee: Rui Costa

6 February 2011 18	Vitória de Setúbal	0–2	Benfica	Setúbal
20:15 CET (UTC+01)			Gaitán 45'; Jara 78'	Stadium: Estádio do Bonfim; Attendance: 8,605; Referee: Cosme Machado

13 February 2011 19	Benfica	3–0	Vitória de Guimarães	Lisbon
18:15 CET (UTC+01)	Sidnei 24'; Aimar 49'; Martins 90+4'			Stadium: Estádio da Luz; Attendance: 54,927; Referee: João Ferreira

21 February 2011 20	Sporting CP	0–2	Benfica	Lisbon
20:15 CET (UTC+01)			Salvio 15'; Gaitán 63'	Stadium: Estádio José Alvalade; Attendance: 34,483; Referee: Artur Soares Dias

27 February 2011 21	Benfica	2–1	Marítimo	Lisbon
18:00 CET (UTC+01)	Salvio 81'; Coentrão 90+4'		Djalma 76'	Stadium: Estádio da Luz; Attendance: 54,991; Referee: Vasco Santos

6 March 2011 22	Braga	2–1	Benfica	Braga
20:15 CET (UTC+01)	Viana 41'; Mossoró 77'		Saviola 19'	Stadium: Estádio Municipal de Braga; Attendance: 18,097; Referee: Carlos Xistra

13 March 2011 23	Benfica	1–1	Portimonense	Lisbon
20:15 CET (UTC+01)	Nuno Gomes 77'		Pessoa 28' (pen.)	Stadium: Estádio da Luz; Attendance: 29,711; Referee: Paulo Baptista

21 March 2011 24	Paços de Ferreira	1–5	Benfica	Paços de Ferreira
20:45 CET (UTC+01)	Carole 28' (o.g.)		Cardozo 5' (pen.); Aimar 13'; Gaitán 25'; Nuno Gomes 82', 90+4'	Stadium: Estádio da Mata Real; Attendance: 3,127; Referee: Artur Soares Dias

3 April 2011 25	Benfica	1–2	Porto	Lisbon
20:30 CET (UTC+01)	Saviola 17' (pen.)		Guarín 9'; Hulk 26' (pen.)	Stadium: Estádio da Luz; Attendance: 40,403; Referee: Duarte Gomes

10 April 2011 26	Naval 1º de Maio	2–1	Benfica	Figueira Foz
20:15 CET (UTC+01)	Moraes 22'; Marinho 83'		Alan Kardec 36'	Stadium: Estádio Municipal José Bento Pessoa; Attendance: 4,217; Referee: Bruno Paixão

17 April 2011 27	Benfica	2–1	Beira-Mar	Lisbon
18:15 CET (UTC+01)	Sidnei 53'; Jara 70'		Yartey 90'	Stadium: Estádio da Luz; Attendance: 25,558; Referee: Elmano Santos

1 May 2011 28	Olhanense	1–1	Benfica	Olhão
18:15 CET (UTC+01)	Djalmir 90+3'		Jara 4'	Stadium: Estádio José Arcanjo; Attendance: 3,375; Referee: Vasco Santos

8 May 2011 29	Rio Ave	1–2	Benfica	Vila do Conde
20:20 CET (UTC+01)	Braga 88'		Cardozo 7', 27'	Stadium: Estádio do Rio Ave FC; Attendance: 2,390; Referee: Marco Ferreira

14 May 2011 30	Benfica	3–3	União de Leiria	Lisbon
20:15 CET (UTC+01)	Cardozo 39'; García 58'; Jara 64'		Silva 43', 88'; Lima 76'	Stadium: Estádio da Luz; Attendance: 29,084; Referee: André Gralha

=== Taça de Portugal ===
16 October 2010 Third round	Benfica	5–1	Arouca	Lisbon
21:00 CET (UTC+01)	Alan Kardec 24', 45'; Saviola 31'; Luisão 66'; Gaitán 86'		Santos 87'	Stadium: Estádio da Luz; Attendance: 23,449; Referee: Marco Ferreira

12 December 2010 Fourth round	Benfica	2–0	Braga	Lisbon
20:15 CET (UTC+01)	Saviola 38'; Aimar 90+3'			Stadium: Estádio da Luz; Attendance: 35,000; Referee: Carlos Xistra

12 January 2011 Fifth round	Benfica	5–0	Olhanense	Lisbon
18:45 CET (UTC+01)	Saviola 20'; Salvio 27'; Cardozo 40', 81'; Luisão 62'			Stadium: Estádio da Luz; Attendance: 32,000; Referee: Paulo Baptista

26 January 2011 Quarter-finals	Rio Ave	0–2	Benfica	Vila do Conde
20:30 CET (UTC+01)			Cardozo 44' (pen.), 87'	Stadium: Estádio do Rio Ave FC; Referee: João Ferreira

==== Semi-finals ====
2 February 2011 First leg	Porto	0–2	Benfica	Porto
20:30 CET (UTC+01)			Coentrão 6'; García 26'	Stadium: Estádio do Dragão; Attendance: 50,000; Referee: Paulo Baptista

20 April 2011 Second leg	Benfica	1–3 (3–3a agg.)	Porto	Lisbon
20:30 CET (UTC+01)	Cardozo 79' (pen.)		Moutinho 64'; Hulk 72'; Falcao 74'	Stadium: Estádio da Luz; Attendance: 42,000; Referee: Carlos Xistra

=== Taça da Liga ===
==== Group stage ====
2 January 2011 1	Benfica	2–0	Marítimo	Lisbon
20:15 CET (UTC+01)	Salvio 24'; Saviola 38'			Stadium: Estádio da Luz; Attendance: 20,804; Referee: João Ferreira

19 January 2011 2	Benfica	3–2	Olhanense	Lisbon
19:15 CET (UTC+01)	García 13'; Jara 23'; Salvio 27'		Djalmir 43'; Duarte 57' (pen.)	Stadium: Estádio da Luz; Attendance: 14,897; Referee: Artur Soares Dias

30 January 2011 3	Desportivo das Aves	0–4	Benfica	Vila das Aves
18:15 CET (UTC+01)			García 35'; Jara 69'; Nuno Gomes 76'; Menezes 90'	Stadium: Estádio do CD das Aves; Attendance: 5,030; Referee: Carlos Xistra

==== Knockout phase ====
2 March 2011 Semi-finals	Benfica	2–1	Sporting CP	Lisbon
20:45 CET (UTC+01)	Cardozo 33'; García 90+2'	Report	Postiga 21'	Stadium: Estádio da Luz; Attendance: 49,652; Referee: Jorge Sousa

23 April 2011 Final	Paços de Ferreira	1–2	Benfica	Coimbra
21:00 CET (UTC+01)	Luisão 49' (o.g.)	Report	Jara 17'; García 43'	Stadium: Estádio Cidade de Coimbra; Attendance: 26,222; Referee: Pedro Proença

=== UEFA Champions League ===
==== Group stage ====
Group B
Team	Pld	W	D	L	GF	GA	GD	Pts
(Germany) Schalke 04	6	4	1	1	10	3	+7	13
(France) Lyon	6	3	1	2	11	10	+1	10
(Portugal) Benfica	6	2	0	4	7	12	−5	6
(Israel) Hapoel Tel Aviv	6	1	2	3	7	10	−3	5

14 September 2010 1	Benfica (Portugal)	2–0	(Israel) Hapoel Tel Aviv	Lisbon, Portugal
20:45 CEST	Luisão 21'; Cardozo 68'	Report		Stadium: Estádio da Luz; Attendance: 31,512; Referee: Aleksei Nikolaev (Russia)

29 September 2010 2	Schalke 04 (Germany)	2–0	(Portugal) Benfica	Gelsenkirchen, Germany
20:45 CEST	Farfán 73'; Huntelaar 85'	Report		Stadium: Veltins-Arena, Attendance: 50,436; Referee: Gianluca Rocchi (Italy)

20 October 2010 3	Lyon (France)	2–0	(Portugal) Benfica	Lyon, France
20:45 CEST	Briand 21'; López 51'	Report		Stadium: Stade de Gerland; Attendance: 36,816; Referee: Alberto Undiano Mallenco (Spain)

2 November 2010 4	Benfica (Portugal)	4–3	(France) Lyon	Lisbon, Portugal
20:45 CEST	Alan Kardec 20'; Coentrão 32', 67'; García 42'	Report	Gourcuff 74'; Gomis 85'; Lovren 90+5'	Stadium: Estádio da Luz; Attendance: 37,394; Referee: Craig Thomson (Scotland)

24 November 2010 5	Hapoel Tel Aviv (Israel)	3–0	(Portugal) Benfica	Tel Aviv, Israel
20:45 CEST	Zahavi 24', 90'; Silva 74'	Report		Stadium: Bloomfield Stadium; Attendance: 11,668; Referee: Alain Hamer (Luxembourg)

7 December 2010 6	Benfica (Portugal)	1–2	(Germany) Schalke 04	Lisbon, Portugal
20:45 CEST	Luisão 87'	Report	Jurado 19'; Höwedes 81'	Stadium: Estádio da Luz; Attendance: 23,348; Referee: Howard Webb (England)

=== UEFA Europa League ===
==== Knockout phase ====
===== Round of 32 =====
17 February 2011 First leg	Benfica (Portugal)	2–1	(Germany) VfB Stuttgart	Lisbon, Portugal
19:00	Cardozo 70'; Jara 81'	Report	Harnik 21'	Stadium: Estádio da Luz; Attendance: 44,852; Referee: Eric Braamhaar (Netherlands)

24 February 2011 Second leg	VfB Stuttgart (Germany)	0–2 (4–1 agg.)	(Portugal) Benfica	Stuttgart, Germany
21:05		Report	Salvio 31'; Cardozo 78'	Stadium: Mercedes-Benz Arena; Attendance: 25,800; Referee: Mike Dean (England)

===== Round of 16 =====
10 March 2011 First leg	Benfica (Portugal)	2–1	(France) Paris Saint-Germain	Lisbon, Portugal
21:05	Pereira 42'; Jara 81'	Report	Luyindula 14'	Stadium: Estádio da Luz; Attendance: 33,928; Referee: Pavel Královec (Czech Republic)

17 March 2011 Second leg	Paris Saint-Germain (France)	1–1 (3–2 agg.)	(Portugal) Benfica	Paris, France
19:00	Bodmer 35'	Report	Gaitán 27'	Stadium: Parc des Princes; Attendance: 40,193; Referee: William Collum (Scotland)

===== Quarter-finals =====
7 April 2011 First leg	Benfica (Portugal)	4–1	(Netherlands) PSV	Lisbon, Portugal
21:05	Aimar 37'; Salvio 45', 52'; Saviola 90+4'	Report	Labyad 80'	Stadium: Estádio da Luz; Attendance: 60,026; Referee: Paolo Tagliavento (Italy)

14 April 2011 Second leg	PSV (Netherlands)	2–2 (6–3 agg.)	(Portugal) Benfica	Eindhoven, Netherlands
21:05	Dzsudzsák 17'; Lens 25'	Report	Luisão 45+2'; Cardozo 63' (pen.)	Stadium: Philips Stadion; Attendance: 29,500; Referee: Wolfgang Stark (Germany)

===== Semi-finals =====
28 April 2011 First leg	Benfica (Portugal)	2–1	(Portugal) Braga	Lisbon, Portugal
21:05	Jardel 50'; Cardozo 59'	Report	Vandinho 53'	Stadium: Estádio da Luz; Attendance: 57,778; Referee: Craig Thomson (Scotland)

5 May 2011 Second leg	Braga (Portugal)	1–0 (2–2 a agg.)	(Portugal) Benfica	Braga, Portugal
21:05	Custódio 19'	Report		Stadium: Estádio Municipal de Braga; Attendance: 25,384; Referee: Martin Atkinson (England)

=== Overall record ===
Competition	First match	Last match	Record								
Competition	First match	Last match	G	W	D	L	GF	GA	GD	Win %	Source
Primeira Liga	15 August 2010	14 May 2011	30	20	3	7	61	31	+30	66.67	
Taça de Portugal	16 October 2010	20 April 2011	6	5	0	1	17	4	+13	83.33	
Taça da Liga	2 January 2011	23 March 2011	5	5	0	0	13	4	+9	100.00	
Supertaça Cândido de Oliveira	7 August 2010	7 August 2010	1	0	0	1	0	2	−2	0.00	
UEFA Champions League	14 September 2010	7 December 2010	6	2	0	4	7	12	−5	33.33	
UEFA Europa League	17 February 2011	5 May 2011	8	5	2	1	15	8	+7	62.50	
Total			56	37	5	14	113	61	+52	66.07	

== Player statistics ==
As of 29 November 2012.

No.	Pos	Nat	Player	Total		Primeira Liga		Portuguese Cup^{1}		League Cup		Europa League^{2}	
No.	Pos	Nat	Player	Apps	Goals	Apps	Goals	Apps	Goals	Apps	Goals	Apps	Goals
Goalkeepers
1	GK	(Portugal) POR	José Moreira	6	-5	2	-2	0	0	4	-3	0	0
12	GK	(Spain) ESP	Roberto	41	-46	25	-23	1	-2	1	-1	14	-20
13	GK	(Brazil) BRA	Júlio César	10	-10	4	-6	6	-4	0	0	0	0
Defenders
14	DF	(Uruguay) URU	Maxi Pereira	49	1	26	0	5	0	4	0	14	1
22	DF	(Portugal) POR	Luís Filipe	5	0	3	0	1	0	1	0	0	0
4	DF	(Brazil) BRA	Luisão	46	6	23	1	7	2	2	0	14	3
23	DF	(Brazil) BRA	David Luiz	28	0	16	0	4	0	2	0	6	0
33	DF	(Brazil) BRA	Jardel	16	1	8	0	1	0	2	0	5	1
27	DF	(Brazil) BRA	Sidnei	28	3	16	3	4	0	4	0	4	0
3	DF	(Portugal) POR	Fábio Faria	1	0	0	0	0	0	1	0	0	0
15	DF	(Portugal) POR	Roderick Miranda	6	0	5	0	0	0	1	0	0	0
18	DF	(Portugal) POR	Fábio Coentrão	45	5	23	2	6	1	2	0	14	2
25	DF	(Portugal) POR	César Peixoto	36	0	16	0	5	0	4	0	11	0
24	DF	(France) FRA	Lionel Carole	6	0	6	0	0	0	0	0	0	0
Midfielders
6	MF	(Spain) ESP	Javi García	45	8	24	2	4	1	4	4	13	1
2	MF	(Brazil) BRA	Airton	28	0	15	0	5	0	4	0	4	0
5	MF	(Portugal) POR	Ruben Amorim	18	0	12	0	3	0	1	0	2	0
10	MF	(Argentina) ARG	Pablo Aimar	46	7	23	5	7	1	4	0	12	1
16	MF	(Brazil) BRA	Felipe Menezes	17	1	7	0	1	0	4	1	5	0
17	MF	(Portugal) POR	Carlos Martins	46	3	25	3	5	0	3	0	13	0
8	MF	(Argentina) ARG	Eduardo Salvio	39	10	19	4	5	1	4	2	11	3
20	MF	(Argentina) ARG	Nicolás Gaitán	48	9	26	7	6	1	3	0	13	1
28	MF	(Argentina) ARG	José Luis Fernández	3	0	2	0	0	0	1	0	0	0
Strikers
7	FW	(Paraguay) PAR	Óscar Cardozo	42	23	22	12	6	5	2	1	12	5
30	FW	(Argentina) ARG	Javier Saviola	47	14	24	9	7	3	4	1	12	1
11	FW	(Argentina) ARG	Franco Jara	43	11	26	6	3	0	5	3	9	2
19	FW	(Brazil) BRA	Weldon	8	0	4	0	3	0	0	0	1	0
21	FW	(Portugal) POR	Nuno Gomes	9	6	6	4	1	0	2	2	0	0
31	FW	(Brazil) BRA	Alan Kardec	24	6	12	3	3	2	2	0	7	1

- 1.Includes 2010 Supertaça Cândido de Oliveira.
- 2.Includes 2010-11 UEFA Champions League

== Transfers ==
=== In ===
==== Summer ====
No.	Pos.	Name	Age	Moving From	Type of Transfer	Contract Ends	Transfer fee	Notes	Source
12	GK	(Spain) Roberto	24	(Spain) Atlético Madrid	Transfer	2016	€8,500,000	N/A	
20	MF	(Argentina) Nicolás Gaitán	22	(Argentina) Boca Juniors	Transfer	2016	€8,400,000	N/A	
#	FW	(Spain) Rodrigo	19	(Spain) Real Madrid	Transfer	2016	€7,000,000	N/A	
11	FW	(Argentina) Franco Jara	21	(Argentina) Arsenal de Sarandí	Transfer	2016	€5,500,000	N/A	
8	MF	(Argentina) Eduardo Salvio	20	(Spain) Atlético Madrid	Loan	2011	€2,500,000	Benfica bought 25% economic rights	
#	GK	(Slovenia) Jan Oblak	17	(Slovenia) Olimpija Ljubljana	Transfer	2016	€1,700,000	N/A	
3	DF	(Portugal) Fábio Faria	21	(Portugal) Rio Ave	Transfer	2015	€2,100,000	N/A	
15	DF	(Portugal) Roderick Miranda	19	(Portugal) SL Benfica	Promoted	2018	Free	N/A	
26	MF	(Algeria) Hassan Yebda	26	(England) Portsmouth	Loan return	2014	Free		
#	DF	(Algeria) Rafik Halliche	23	(Portugal) Nacional	Loan return	2015	Free		
#	DF	(Ivory Coast) Marco Zoro	26	(Portugal) Vitória de Setúbal	Loan return	2011	Free		
#	FW	(Ghana) Ishmael Yartey	20	(Portugal) Beira-Mar	Loan return	2013	Free		
#	DF	(Brazil) Leandro da Silva	21	(Portugal) Vitória de Guimarães	Loan return	2014	Free		
#	MF	(Brazil) Fellipe Bastos	20	(Switzerland) Servette	Loan return	2012	Free		
#	DF	(Portugal) Rúben Lima	20	(Portugal) Vitória Setúbal	Loan return	2012	Free		
#	FW	(Portugal) André Carvalhas	20	(Portugal) Fátima	Loan return	2011	Free		
#	MF	(Portugal) Miguel Rosa	21	(Portugal) Carregado	Loan return	2012	Free		
#	FW	(Portugal) Ariza Makukula	29	(Turkey) Kayserispor	Loan return	2013	Free		
3	DF	(Argentina) José Shaffer	24	(Argentina) Banfield	Loan return	2013	Free		
#	FW	(Uruguay) Jonathan Urretavizcaya	20	(Uruguay) Peñarol	Loan return	2013	Free		
#	FW	(Equatorial Guinea) Javier Balboa	25	(Spain) Cartagena	Loan return	2013	Free		
#	FW	(Portugal) Nélson Oliveira	18	(Portugal) Rio Ave	Loan return	2018	Free		
#	DF	(Portugal) Abel Pereira	21	(Portugal) Tondela	Loan return	2012	Free		
#	FW	(Portugal) Ivan Santos	21	(Portugal) Atlético CP	Loan	2011	Free		
#	FW	(Portugal) Hélio Vaz	19	(Portugal) Tondela	Loan return	2012	Free		
#	FW	(Portugal) André Soares	20	(Portugal) Atlético CP	Loan return	2012	Free		
#	FW	(Portugal) José Coelho	20	(Portugal) Paços Ferreira	Loan return	2012	Free		
#	MF	(Portugal) David Simão	20	(Portugal) Fátima	Loan return	2015	Free		
#	MF	(Portugal) Leandro Pimenta	19	(Portugal) Beira-Mar	Loan return	2013	Free		
#	MF	(Cameroon) Gilles Binya	25	(Switzerland) Neuchâtel Xamax	Loan return	2012	Free		
#	DF	(Portugal) João Pereira	20	(Portugal) Fátima	Loan return	2012	Free		

==== Winter ====
No.	Pos.	Name	Age	Moving From	Type of Transfer	Contract Ends	Transfer fee	Notes	Source
28	MF	(Argentina) José Luis Fernández	23	(Argentina) Racing Club	Transfer	2015	€1,858,789	N/A	
24	DF	(France) Lionel Carole	19	(France) Nantes	Transfer	2015	€1,400,000	N/A	
33	DF	(Brazil) Jardel	24	(Portugal) Olhanense	Transfer	2016	€375,000	N/A	
#	MF	(Brazil) Elvis	20	(Brazil) Paraná Clube	Transfer	2016	€580,000	N/A	

Spend : ▼€37,950,000

=== Out ===
==== Summer ====
No.	Pos.	Name	Age	Moving to	Type of transfer	Transfer fee	Source
9	FW	(Angola) Mantorras	28	-	Retirement	-	
20	MF	(Argentina) Ángel Di María	22	(Spain) Real Madrid	Transfer	€25,000,000 + €11M add-ons	
8	MF	(Brazil) Ramires	23	(England) Chelsea	Transfer	€22,000,000	
#	DF	(Algeria) Rafik Halliche	23	(England) Fulham	Transfer	€1,500,000	
#	FW	(Portugal) Ariza Makukula	29	(Turkey) Manisaspor	Transfer	€2,000,000	
#	DF	(Brazil) Leandro da Silva	21	(Brazil) Paraná Clube	Contract terminated	Free	
#	GK	(Portugal) Quim	34	(Portugal) Braga	Transfer	Free	
#	DF	(Portugal) Rúben Lima	20	(Portugal) Beira-Mar	Transfer	Free	
#	DF	(Portugal) João Pereira	20	(Portugal) Beira-Mar	Transfer	Free	
#	MF	(Cameroon) Gilles Binya	25	(Switzerland) Neuchâtel Xamax	Transfer	Free	
#	FW	(Ghana) Ishmael Yartey	20	(Portugal) Fátima	Loan	Free	
#	GK	(Slovenia) Jan Oblak	17	(Portugal) Beira-Mar	Loan	Free	
#	DF	(Algeria) Hassan Yebda	26	(Italy) Napoli	Loan	Free	
#	FW	(Spain) Rodrigo	19	(England) Bolton Wanderers	Loan	Free	
#	FW	(Uruguay) Urreta	20	(Spain) Deportivo La Coruña	Loan	Free	
#	DF	(Argentina) José Shaffer	24	(Argentina) Rosario Central	Loan	Free	
#	MF	(Brazil) Fellipe Bastos	20	(Brazil) Vasco da Gama	Loan	Free	
#	FW	(Brazil) Éder Luís	25	(Brazil) Vasco da Gama	Loan	Free	
#	FW	(Portugal) Nélson Oliveira	18	(Portugal) Paços Ferreira	Loan	Free	
#	MF	(Portugal) David Simão	20	(Portugal) Paços Ferreira	Loan	Free	
#	FW	(Portugal) José Coelho	20	(Portugal) Fátima	Loan	Free	
#	FW	(Portugal) Ivan Santos	21	(Portugal) Espinho	Loan	Free	
#	DF	(Portugal) Abel Pereira	21	(Portugal) Fátima	Loan	Free	
#	FW	(Portugal) André Carvalhas	21	(Portugal) Fátima	Loan	Free	
#	MF	(Portugal) Miguel Rosa	21	(Portugal) Belenenses	Loan	Free	
#	MF	(Portugal) Lassana Camará	18	(Switzerland) Servette	Loan	Free	
#	FW	(Portugal) Hélio Vaz	19	(Portugal) Tondela	Loan	Free	
#	FW	(Portugal) André Soares	20	(Switzerland) Servette	Loan	Free	
#	FW	(Portugal) Evandro Brandão	19	(Portugal) Fátima	Loan	Free	
#	MF	(Portugal) Leandro Pimenta	19	(Portugal) Fátima	Loan	Free	
#	DF	(Portugal) Mário Rui	19	(Portugal) Fátima	Loan	Free	
#	DF	(Portugal) Miguel Vítor	21	(England) Leicester City	Loan	Free	
#	DF	(Portugal) Jorge Ribeiro	28	(Portugal) Vitória de Guimarães	Loan	Free	

==== Winter ====
No.	Pos.	Name	Age	Moving to	Type of transfer	Transfer fee	Source
23	DF	(Brazil) David Luiz	23	(England) Chelsea	Transfer	€25,000,000 + Nemanja Matić	
2	DF	(Brazil) Patric	21	(Brazil) Atlético Mineiro	Transfer	€1,300,000	
#	DF	(Ivory Coast) Marco Zoro	27	(Romania) Universitatea Craiova	Loan	Free	
3	DF	(Argentina) José Shaffer	24	(Argentina) Banfield	Loan	Free	
#	FW	(Uruguay) Urreta	20	(Uruguay) Peñarol	Loan	Free	
#	FW	(United States) Freddy Adu	21	(Turkey) Çaykur Rizespor	Loan	Free	
#	FW	(Equatorial Guinea) Javier Balboa	25	(Spain) Albacete	Loan	Free	
#	FW	(Brazil) Marcel	29	(Brazil) Vasco da Gama	Loan	Free	
#	FW	(Ghana) Ishmael Yartey	20	(Portugal) Beira-Mar	Loan	Free	
#	GK	(Slovenia) Jan Oblak	17	(Portugal) Olhanense	Loan	Free	
3	DF	(Portugal) Fábio Faria	21	(Spain) Real Valladolid	Loan	Free	
#	DF	(Portugal) Abel Pereira	21	(Portugal) Gondomar	Loan	Free	
#	FW	(Portugal) Evandro Brandão	19	(Portugal) Gondomar	Loan	Free	
#	FW	(Portugal) Hélio Vaz	20	(Portugal) Casa Pia	Loan	Free	

Transfer income: ▲€76,800,000

=== Overall transfer activity ===
==== Spending ====
Summer: ▼€34,700,000
Winter: ▼€3,250,000
Total: ▼€37,950,000

==== Income ====
Summer: ▲€50,500,000
Winter: ▲€26,300,000
Total: ▲€76,800,000

==== Expenditure ====
Summer: ▲€15,800,000
Winter: ▲€23,050,000
Total: ▲€38,850,000
