= 2011 Taça da Liga final =

- Event: 2010–11 Taça da Liga
Paços de Ferreira	Benfica
1	2
- Date: 23 April 2011
- Venue: Estádio Cidade de Coimbra, Coimbra
- Man of the Match: José Moreira
- Referee: Pedro Proença
- Attendance: 26,222

The 2011 Taça da Liga final was the fourth final of the Taça da Liga tournament in Portugal, a competition involving the top 32 clubs in the Portuguese football league system, the Primeira Liga and the Liga de Honra teams. The final was contested on 23 April 2011 by Benfica and Paços de Ferreira and was played at the Estádio Cidade de Coimbra in Coimbra. This was the first time that the final was played at this stadium since the past three editions were at the Estádio Algarve in Faro. This was the third consecutive final appearance for Benfica and the first ever for Paços de Ferreira.

== Background ==
Benfica went into the match as the Taça da Liga title holder, having won the previous two finals, in 2009 and 2010, while this was the first ever Paços de Ferreira appearance in the decisive game. Both teams started at difference stages in the competition — Paços de Ferreira in the second round, as part of the six last teams from the previous Primeira Liga and two promoted teams from last year's Liga de Honra, and Benfica in the third round, comprising the faction of the top eight Primeira Liga teams from the last season. After overcoming Leixões in a two-legged fixture, following an away draw and a home victory, Paços de Ferreira topped Group C, composed by the two Minho rivals, Braga and Vitória de Guimarães, as well as Arouca. Benfica won Group B, which included Marítimo, Desportivo das Aves and Olhanense. The two teams won their respective groups with the perfect score of three victories out of three matches. In the semi-finals, Benfica hosted and won over Lisbon rivals Sporting CP, with a late winner coming in the last moments of stoppage time, after being one goal down during the first half. Paços de Ferreira played at Nacional's stadium and won an entertaining match that ended in a 4–3 result, controlling the scoreline during much part of the second half due to an early two-goal advantage.

== Route to the final ==
Note: In all results below, the score of the finalist is given first (H: home; A: away).

Paços de Ferreira			Round	Benfica		
Opponent	Result	Stadium	First round	Opponent	Result	Stadium
Bye			First round	Bye		
Opponent	Result	Stadium	Second round	Opponent	Result	Stadium
Leixões	1–1 (A)	Estádio do Mar	First leg	Bye		
Leixões	2–1 (H)	Mata Real	Second leg	Bye		
Opponent	Result	Stadium	Third round	Opponent	Result	Stadium
Arouca	3–2 (A)	Estádio Municipal de Arouca	Matchday 1	Marítimo	2–0 (H)	Estádio da Luz
Braga	3–2 (A)	Estádio Municipal de Braga	Matchday 2	Olhanense	3–2 (H)	Estádio da Luz
Vitória de Guimarães	2–1 (H)	Mata Real	Matchday 3	Desportivo das Aves	4–0 (A)	Estádio do Aves
Group C winners: Team / Pld / W / D / L / GF / GA / GD / Pts; Paços de Ferreira / 3 / 3 / 0 / 0 / 8 / 5 / +3 / 9; Braga / 3 / 2 / 0 / 1 / 9 / 4 / +5 / 6; Vitória de Guimarães / 3 / 1 / 0 / 2 / 3 / 5 / −2 / 3; Arouca / 3 / 0 / 0 / 3 / 2 / 8 / −6 / 0			Final standings	Group B winners: Team / Pld / W / D / L / GF / GA / GD / Pts; Benfica / 3 / 3 / 0 / 0 / 9 / 2 / +7 / 9; Marítimo / 3 / 2 / 0 / 1 / 3 / 3 / 0 / 6; Desportivo das Aves / 3 / 1 / 0 / 2 / 4 / 8 / −4 / 3; Olhanense / 3 / 0 / 0 / 3 / 4 / 7 / −3 / 0		
Opponent	Result	Stadium	Knockout phase	Opponent	Result	Stadium
Nacional	4–3 (A)	Estádio da Madeira	Semi-finals	Sporting CP	2–1 (H)	Estádio da Luz

== Match ==
=== Details ===
23 April 2011
21:00 UTC

Paços de Ferreira	1–2	Benfica
Luisão 50' (o.g.)		Jara 17'; García 42'

Estádio Cidade de Coimbra, Coimbra
Attendance: 26,222
Referee: Pedro Proença

Paços de Ferreira	Benfica

PAÇOS DE FERREIRA:
GK	1	(Brazil) Cássio	(yellow card) 90+2'
RB	15	(Brazil) Baiano
CB	5	(Paraguay) Javier Cohene
CB	2	(Brazil) Ozéia
LB	7	(Brazil) Maykon	(yellow card) 26'
DM	8	(Portugal) André Leão	(substituted off) 79'
CM	16	(Brazil) Leonel Olímpio	(yellow card) 33'
CM	10	(Portugal) David Simão	(substituted off) 75'
RW	81	(Portugal) Manuel José (c)	(substituted off) 71'
LW	31	(Portugal) Pizzi
CF	19	(Venezuela) Mario Rondón
Substitutes:
GK	45	(Portugal) António Filipe
LB	13	(Portugal) Bura
RB	96	(Portugal) Filipe Anunciação	(substituted in) 79'
CM	11	(Portugal) Rui Caetano	(substituted in) 71'
CM	17	(Portugal) Nuno Santos
FW	21	(Republic of Ireland) Pádraig Amond
FW	24	(Portugal) Nélson Oliveira	(substituted in) 75'
Manager:
(Portugal) Rui Vitória

BENFICA:
GK	1	(Portugal) José Moreira
RB	14	(Uruguay) Maxi Pereira	(yellow card) 30'
CB	4	(Brazil) Luisão (c)	(yellow card) 49'
CB	33	(Brazil) Jardel
LB	18	(Portugal) Fábio Coentrão
DM	6	(Spain) Javi García
RM	17	(Portugal) Carlos Martins	(substituted off) 61'
LM	11	(Argentina) Franco Jara
CM	10	(Argentina) Pablo Aimar	(substituted off) 90+2'
FW	30	(Argentina) Javier Saviola	(substituted off) 68'
FW	7	(Paraguay) Óscar Cardozo
Substitutes:
GK	12	(Spain) Roberto
LB	25	(Portugal) César Peixoto	(substituted in) 61'
CB	27	(Brazil) Sidnei
DM	2	(Brazil) Airton	(substituted in) 68'
CM	16	(Brazil) Felipe Menezes	(substituted in) 90+2'
FW	19	(Brazil) Weldon
FW	31	(Brazil) Alan Kardec
Manager:
(Portugal) Jorge Jesus

2010–11 Taça da Liga Winners
Benfica
3rd Title

== See also ==
- 2010–11 S.L. Benfica season
- 2011 Taça de Portugal final
