= 2006–07 Real Madrid Castilla season =

Real Madrid Castilla
2006–07 season
- Manager: Míchel
- Segunda División: 19th (relegated)
- Top goalscorer: Álvaro Negredo (18)
Home colours	Away colours	Third colours

During the 2006–07 Spanish football season, Real Madrid Castilla competed in the Segunda División.

== Season summary ==
Real Madrid Castilla were relegated to the Segunda División B at the end of the season.

== Squad ==
Squad at end of season

Note: Flags indicate national team as defined under FIFA eligibility rules; some limited exceptions apply. Players may hold more than one non-FIFA nationality.

No.	Pos.	Nation	Player
1	GK	ESP	Jordi Codina
2	DF	ESP	Miguel Palencia
3	DF	ESP	Daniel Guillén
4	DF	ESP	Agus
5	DF	ESP	Sergio
6	MF	ESP	Marcos Tébar
7	MF	ESP	Borja Valero
8	MF	ESP	Javi García
9	FW	ESP	Álvaro Negredo
10	MF	ESP	Adrián
11	MF	ESP	Esteban Granero
12	DF	BRA	Marcelo
13	GK	ESP	Francisco Casilla
14	FW	ESP	Alberto Bueno
16	DF	ESP	Sergio Sánchez
18	MF	ESP	Rodri
19	FW	ESP	Rayco García

No.	Pos.	Nation	Player
20	DF	ESP	Rafael Santacruz
21	FW	ESP	Rubén de la Red
22	DF	ESP	Miguel Torres
24	DF	ESP	Angelo
25	GK	ESP	Antonio Adán
27	MF	ESP	Pedro Mosquera
28	FW	ESP	Juan Mata
30	MF	ESP	David Vázquez
31	DF	ESP	David Mateos
32	MF	ESP	Miguel Ángel Nieto
34	GK	ESP	Felipe
37	FW	ESP	José Callejón
38	MF	ESP	Juanmi Callejón
40	DF	ESP	Javier Velayos
41	DF	ESP	José Luis Arroyo
42	MF	ESP	Dani Parejo

=== Left club during season ===
Note: Flags indicate national team as defined under FIFA eligibility rules; some limited exceptions apply. Players may hold more than one non-FIFA nationality.

No.	Pos.	Nation	Player
10	MF	ESP	Ernesto Gómez (to Málaga)
10	MF	ESP	Álex Pérez (to Aris)
14	DF	NED	Jeffrey Hoogervorst (to Barcelona B)

No.	Pos.	Nation	Player
23	FW	JOR	Thaer Fayed (to Barcelona B)
33	MF	ESP	Joni (to Villarreal B)
