= Giulio Mulas =

Italian footballer

Personal information
- Date of birth: 9 November 1996 (age 30)
- Place of birth: Poggibonsi, Italy
- Height: 1.78 m (5 ft 10 in)
- Position: Defender

Team information
- Current team: CS Lebowski

Youth career
- –2013: Siena

Senior career*
| Years | Team | Apps | (Gls) |
| 2013–2014 | Siena | 0 | (0) |
| 2014–2015 | Parma | 0 | (0) |
| 2014–2015 | → Tuttocuoio (loan) | 10 | (0) |
| 2015–2016 | Parma | 2 | (0) |
| 2016–2017 | Tuttocuoio | 27 | (0) |
| 2017–2019 | Carpi | 0 | (0) |
| 2017–2018 | → Pistoiese (loan) | 30 | (1) |
| 2018–2019 | → Piacenza (loan) | 10 | (0) |
| 2019–2020 | San Donato | 8 | (0) |
| 2021 | Montevarchi | 11 | (0) |
| 2021–2022 | Grassina | | |
| 2022–2023 | Cuoiopelli | | |
| 2023– | CS Lebowski | | |

International career
| 2012–2013 | Italy U-17 | 4 | (0) |
- * Club domestic league appearances and goals as of 18:10, 2 June 2024 (UTC)

Giulio Mulas (born 9 November 1996) is an Italian football player. He plays for Italian Promozione side CS Lebowski.

== Club career ==
He made his Serie C debut for Tuttocuoio on 17 September 2014 in a game against Pro Piacenza.

On 11 September 2019, he joined Serie D club San Donato.
