= José Arroyo =

José Arroyo can refer to:

- Joe Arroyo (1955–2011), Colombian singer
- Jose Miguel Arroyo (born 1945), former First Gentleman of the Philippines
- José Luis Arroyo (born 1987), Puerto Rican footballer
- José Miguel Arroyo Delgado (born 1969), Spanish bullfighter
- José Miguel Arroyo (politician), Mexican secretary of foreign affairs in 1853
- José Francisco Arroyo de Anda, namesake of Doctor Arroyo, Nuevo León municipality in Mexico
- Jose Arroyo (writer), two time Primetime Emmy Award for Outstanding Writing for a Variety Series winner

== See also ==
- San José Arroyo Seco, community in San Felipe Jalapa de Díaz municipality in Mexico
