= Bura (footballer) =

Portuguese footballer

Personal information
- Full name: Miguel Ângelo Marques Granja
- Date of birth: 17 December 1988 (age 37)
- Place of birth: Matosinhos, Portugal
- Height: 1.91 m (6 ft 3 in)
- Position: Centre-back

Team information
- Current team: Atlético CP
- Number: 44

Youth career
- 2002–2004: Leixões
- 2004–2006: Infesta
- 2006–2007: Porto

Senior career*
| Years | Team | Apps | (Gls) |
| 2007–2011 | Porto | 0 | (0) |
| 2007–2008 | → Ribeirão (loan) | 29 | (3) |
| 2008 | → Portimonense (loan) | 0 | (0) |
| 2008–2009 | → Covilhã (loan) | 20 | (1) |
| 2009 | → Gil Vicente (loan) | 6 | (0) |
| 2010 | → Penafiel (loan) | 11 | (0) |
| 2010–2011 | → Paços Ferreira (loan) | 14 | (0) |
| 2011–2013 | Beira-Mar | 29 | (1) |
| 2013–2014 | Chaves | 24 | (3) |
| 2014–2015 | Penafiel | 12 | (0) |
| 2015–2018 | Académico Viseu | 106 | (21) |
| 2018–2020 | Leixões | 51 | (3) |
| 2020–2021 | Chaves | 20 | (1) |
| 2021–2023 | Mafra | 28 | (2) |
| 2023–2025 | União Leiria | 53 | (3) |
| 2025–2026 | Oliveirense | 31 | (4) |
| 2026– | Atlético CP | 3 | (0) |

International career
| 2006 | Portugal U18 | 2 | (0) |
| 2006–2007 | Portugal U19 | 15 | (1) |
| 2008 | Portugal U20 | 8 | (0) |
| 2008–2010 | Portugal U21 | 13 | (3) |
| 2010 | Portugal U23 | 1 | (0) |
- * Club domestic league appearances and goals as of 13 September 2026

Miguel Ângelo Marques Granja (born 17 December 1988), known as Bura, is a Portuguese professional footballer who plays as a central defender for Liga 3 club Atlético CP.

He played 55 Primeira Liga matches for Paços de Ferreira, Beira-Mar and Penafiel, but spent most of his career in the second division where he made over 300 appearances with ten teams, mainly Académico de Viseu.

== Club career ==
=== Porto ===
Born in Matosinhos, Porto Metropolitan Area, Bura began his youth career with hometown clubs Leixões S.C. and F.C. Infesta before joining FC Porto at the age of 17. Never included for a matchday squad with the team, he had his first senior experience in the third division on loan to G.D. Ribeirão, and professional one with Portimonense SC, S.C. Covilhã, Gil Vicente F.C. and F.C. Penafiel all in Segunda Liga.

On 5 July 2010, Bura was loaned to Primeira Liga side F.C. Paços de Ferreira for the upcoming season. He made 15 total appearances for them, and was an unused substitute on 23 April as they lost the final of the Taça da Liga to S.L. Benfica at the Estádio Cidade de Coimbra.

=== Later career ===
Bura rescinded his Porto contract in August 2011, and signed for fellow top-flight team S.C. Beira-Mar. In July 2013, he joined G.D. Chaves who had just been promoted to division two and, a year later, was added to the ranks of F.C. Penafiel of the top tier.

In July 2015, after Penafiel's relegation as dead last, Bura moved to second-tier club Académico de Viseu F.C. on a three-year deal. He scored a career-best 11 goals in his second season there, including a brace in a 3–3 away draw against C.F. União on 12 November 2016 (through penalty kicks).

Bura returned to Leixões after 14 years away on 1 June 2018, on a two-year contract; he was signed by his former Académico manager Francisco Chaló, and had been close to joining a year earlier. He alternated between the second and third divisions the following seasons, with Chaves, C.D. Mafra, U.D. Leiria and U.D. Oliveirense.

== International career ==
Bura earned 38 caps for Portugal from under-18 to under-23 level. He was part of the under-19 team at the 2007 UEFA European Championship in Austria, and scored in a 2–0 win over the hosts though other results eliminated the team from the group.
