= Borja Valero =

Spanish footballer (born 1985)

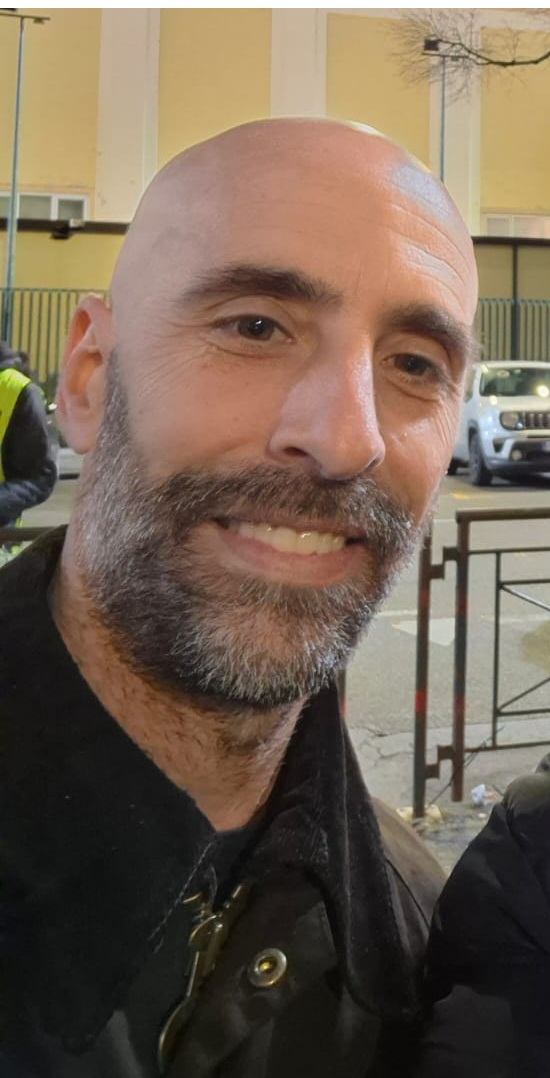
- Valero in 2026

Personal information
- Full name: Borja Valero Iglesias
- Date of birth: 12 January 1985 (age 41)
- Place of birth: Madrid, Spain
- Height: 1.75 m (5 ft 9 in)
- Position: Midfielder

Youth career
- 1995–1997: Villa Rosa
- 1997–2004: Real Madrid

Senior career*
Years	Team	Apps	(Gls)
2004–2005	Real Madrid C		
2005–2007	Real Madrid B	77	(4)
2007–2008	Mallorca	34	(4)
2008–2011	West Bromwich Albion	31	(0)
2009–2010	→ Mallorca (loan)	33	(5)
2010–2011	→ Villarreal (loan)	35	(3)
2011–2012	Villarreal	36	(5)
2012–2017	Fiorentina	165	(14)
2017–2020	Inter Milan	82	(4)
2020–2021	Fiorentina	20	(0)
2021–2023	Lebowski	5	(0)
Total		518	(39)

International career
2002–2003	Spain U17	15	(3)
2003	Spain U18	3	(1)
2004	Spain U19	4	(2)
2011	Spain	1	(0)
- * Club domestic league appearances and goals

Borja Valero Iglesias (Spanish pronunciation: [ˈboɾxa βaˈleɾo]; born 12 January 1985) is a Spanish former professional footballer who played as a midfielder.

He began his career with Real Madrid but did not have any impact with its first team, and played for Mallorca and in England for West Bromwich Albion before joining Villarreal in 2010. He also spent nine years in the Italian Serie A, with Fiorentina and Inter Milan.

Over five seasons, Valero amassed La Liga totals of 139 games and 16 goals. He made one appearance for the Spain national team.

== Club career ==
=== Real Madrid ===
Valero was born in Madrid, and began his football career as a youngster in the ranks of Real Madrid. He made his first appearance for the reserve side in the Segunda División B as a second-half substitute, took part in the playoffs to earn promotion then spent two full seasons with them in the Segunda División.

Valero played only twice for the first team: given his debut by Fabio Capello against Écija on 25 October 2006, replacing Javi García after 60 minutes of a match in the Copa del Rey, he also featured once in the UEFA Champions League, substituting Miguel Ángel Nieto in a 2–2 away draw with Dynamo Kyiv in the group stage.

=== Mallorca ===
In August 2007, Valero signed a five-year contract with Mallorca following his release from Real Madrid. He scored his first La Liga goals in a 7–1 home win over Recreativo de Huelva on 9 March 2008, and added another a month later, against his former team in a 1–1 home draw.

Valero scored the first goal on 11 May 2008, as his side came back from 2–0 down to beat Barcelona in Frank Rijkaard's last home game as the latter's manager. He made 17 starts and played a total of 1,892 minutes during the season, helping to a seventh-place finish.

In mid-August 2008, Mallorca's president stated that he had rejected bids from West Bromwich Albion for Valero and Óscar Trejo, but a week later, the former signed for the latter – newly promoted to the Premier League – for a club record fee of €7 million (£4.7 million). He agreed a four-year contract, with the option of a further year.

=== West Bromwich Albion ===
Valero made his debut four days later in Albion's 3–1 League Cup defeat away to Hartlepool United. Manager Tony Mowbray said that he would have benefited from his first game in English football, only hours after receiving international clearance, despite the loss.

Following the team's relegation to the Championship after just one season, Valero said that he intended to remain at the club: "I still have a three-year contract here and would like to be true to that. For sure playing in the second division is not ideal. But if I have to put up with it then I am going to put up with it." By the beginning of the next campaign, however, he had changed his mind: "I prefer to play in Mallorca and not to be in the second division in England. This is clear. I am disposed for a loan return but it is necessary for an accord between the clubs".

Just hours before the close of the transfer window, Valero returned to Mallorca on loan for 2009–10. On 13 September, in the first match in his second spell, he scored their 1000th top-flight goal in a 1–1 draw at Villarreal. In another away fixture, he netted in the last minute for the nine-man side to clinch a 1–1 draw against Atlético Madrid in October, and was ever-present as they finished fifth and qualified for the UEFA Europa League; he also won the prestigious Don Balón Award for the best Spanish player in the Spanish League.

At the end of the campaign, Valero returned to his parent club after Mallorca confirmed they could not afford to take up the agreed fee of £2.5 million to make the move permanent.

=== Villarreal ===
For 2010–11, it was reported that Valero was joining Villarreal on a five-year contract, but the clubs eventually agreed on a season-long loan, with the move to be made permanent at the end of the campaign. He scored on his home debut, a 4–0 victory over Espanyol on 12 September 2010, and featured heavily throughout the season as the team finished in fourth position and qualified for the Champions League.

On 1 July 2011, Villarreal signed Valero on a permanent basis for an undisclosed fee. The former were relegated at the end of the campaign, and it was reported that he was among a number of players expected to leave.

=== Fiorentina ===
On 1 August 2012, Fiorentina agreed with Villarreal for the transfer of Valero. The move was confirmed three days later, and he joined the Serie A side alongside teammate Gonzalo Rodríguez; he stated that leaving his previous club was not easy and that he still had not come to terms with its relegation.

Valero made an immediate impact at the Viola, scoring five league goals in 37 games in his first season and providing 11 assists as the team qualified for the Europa League. He scored his first goal in 2013–14 on 15 September in a 1–1 home draw against Cagliari, and, on 2 November, contributed to a 2–0 win at AC Milan; subsequently, he was named in Goal.com's Serie A Team of the Season.

On 15 July 2014, Valero signed a new deal at the Stadio Artemio Franchi until June 2019.

=== Inter Milan ===
On 10 July 2017, Valero transferred to Inter Milan on a three-year contract. He scored his first goal for his new club on 30 October, in a 2–1 away victory against Hellas Verona.

Valero scored twice from 19 appearances in the 2019–20 campaign for the runners-up.

=== Later career ===
On 16 September 2020, aged 35, Valero returned to Fiorentina. On 30 June 2021, he announced his retirement from professional football, but on 19 August confirmed to have agreed to join Florence-based fan-owned Promozione amateur club Lebowski.

== International career ==
Valero represented the Spain under-19 team at the 2004 UEFA European Championship. In the final against Turkey he entered the match as an 85th-minute substitute and, two minutes into stoppage time, scored the only goal of the game.

On 4 June 2011, Valero made his debut for the full side, against the United States in Foxborough, Massachusetts. He replaced David Silva in the second half, and assisted Fernando Torres in the last goal.

== Style of play ==
Primarily a central midfielder, Valero is best known for his positional sense, vision, technique and passing ability, as well as his leadership, despite his lack of pace. He is also capable of playing as a deep-lying playmaker in front of the defence, as an attacking midfielder or even as an offensive-minded central midfielder, known as the "mezzala" role in Italian football jargon.

== Career statistics ==
=== Club ===
Appearances and goals by club, season and competition
Club	Season	League			Cup (Note: Includes Copa del Rey, FA Cup and EFL Cup)		Continental		Total	
Club	Season	Division	Apps	Goals	Apps	Goals	Apps	Goals	Apps	Goals
Real Madrid B	2005–06	Segunda División	39	2	—		—		39	2
Real Madrid B	2006–07	Segunda División	37	2	—		—		37	2
Real Madrid B	Total		76	4	—		—		76	4
Real Madrid	2006–07	La Liga	0	0	1	0	1	0	2	0
Mallorca	2007–08	La Liga	34	4	6	0	—		40	4
West Bromwich Albion	2008–09	Premier League	30	0	4	0	—		34	0
West Bromwich Albion	2009–10	Championship	1	0	1	0	—		2	0
West Bromwich Albion	Total		31	0	5	0	—		36	0
Mallorca (loan)	2009–10	La Liga	33	5	5	0	—		38	5
Villarreal	2010–11	La Liga	35	3	5	0	13	2	53	5
Villarreal	2011–12	La Liga	36	5	2	1	6	0	44	6
Villarreal	Total		71	8	7	1	19	2	97	11
Fiorentina	2012–13	Serie A	37	1	4	1	—		41	2
Fiorentina	2013–14	Serie A	32	6	4	0	11	1	47	7
Fiorentina	2014–15	Serie A	28	2	3	0	11	0	42	2
Fiorentina	2015–16	Serie A	37	4	0	0	5	0	42	4
Fiorentina	2016–17	Serie A	31	1	2	0	6	1	39	2
Fiorentina	Total		165	14	13	1	33	2	211	17
Inter Milan	2017–18	Serie A	36	2	1	0	—		37	2
Inter Milan	2018–19	Serie A	27	0	1	0	10	0	39	0
Inter Milan	2019–20	Serie A	19	2	1	1	5	0	25	3
Inter Milan	Total		82	4	3	1	15	0	100	5
Fiorentina	2020–21	Serie A	20	0	1	0	—		21	0
Lebowski	2021–22	Promozione	5	0	2	0	—		7	0
Lebowski	2022–23	Promozione	0	0	0	0	—		0	0
Lebowski	Total		5	0	2	0	0	0	7	0
Career total			517	39	43	3	68	4	628	46

=== International ===
Appearances and goals by national team and year
National team	Year	Apps	Goals
Spain	2011	1	0
Total		1	0

== Honours ==
Fiorentina

- Coppa Italia runner-up: 2013–14

Inter Milan

- UEFA Europa League runner-up: 2019–20

Spain U-19

- UEFA European Under-19 Championship: 2004

Individual

- Don Balón Award: 2010
- Serie A Team of the Year: 2012–13
- UEFA Europa League Squad of the Season: 2013–14, 2014–15
