= Luisão =

Brazilian footballer

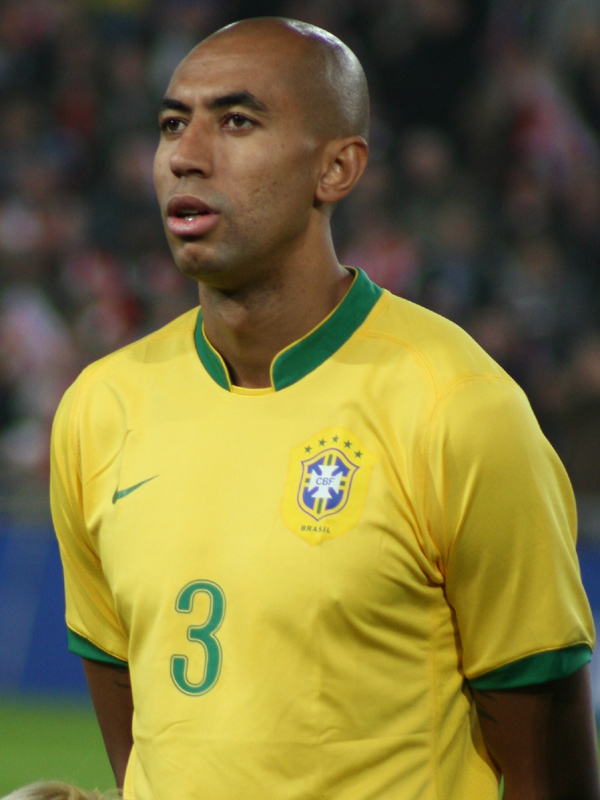
- Luisão before a match with Brazil in 2006

Personal information
- Full name: Ânderson Luís da Silva
- Date of birth: 13 February 1981 (age 45)
- Place of birth: Amparo, São Paulo, Brazil
- Height: 1.94 m (6 ft 4 in)
- Position: Centre back

Senior career*
Years	Team	Apps	(Gls)
1999	Juventus-SP	18	(1)
2000–2003	Cruzeiro	62	(7)
2003–2018	Benfica	337	(26)
Total		417	(34)

International career
2001	Brazil U20	4	(0)
2001–2011	Brazil	44	(3)
Medal record
Representing Brazil
Copa América
Winner	2004 Peru
FIFA Confederations Cup
Winner	2005 Germany
Winner	2009 South Africa
- * Club domestic league appearances and goals

Ânderson Luís da Silva (born 13 February 1981), known as Luisão, is a Brazilian former professional footballer who played as a centre back.

Luisão started his career at Juventus-SP in 1999 before moving to Cruzeiro the year later, where he spent three seasons. Then, from 2003 to 2018, the rest of his professional career was spent with Portuguese club Benfica, for which he appeared in 538 official matches, holding the club record for most international matches (127), major titles won (20) and longest-serving captain (414 matches).

A Brazilian international on 44 occasions, Luisão appeared for the country in two World Cups and three Copa América tournaments, scoring three goals.

== Club career ==
=== Brazil ===
Born in Amparo, São Paulo, Luisão represented Clube Atlético Juventus and Cruzeiro Esporte Clube in his country, scoring a career-best 6 goals in 24 matches in his third season with the latter.

=== Benfica ===
In the summer of 2003, Luisão moved to Europe to sign with Portuguese club Benfica for a £890,000 transfer fee paid by the Lisbon-based side. He faced a tough period of adaptation, during which time he performed somewhat below his capabilities and even considered traveling back to his home country. However, he managed to score in his league debut, a 3–3 home draw against C.F. Os Belenenses on 14 September. He ended his first season winning the Taça de Portugal after Benfica defeated fierce rivals FC Porto 2–1 in the tournament final.

During the 2004–05 season Luisão featured regularly in Benfica's central defence alongside Ricardo Rocha, appearing in 29 matches and contributing heavily for Benfica's first league title in 11 years. On 24 April 2005, in a 2–1 away victory over G.D. Estoril Praia, he scored his first goal of the season, the match's equaliser. On 14 May, he found the net through a header against Lisbon rivals Sporting CP, scoring the match's only goal and ousting the opponents from the title race.

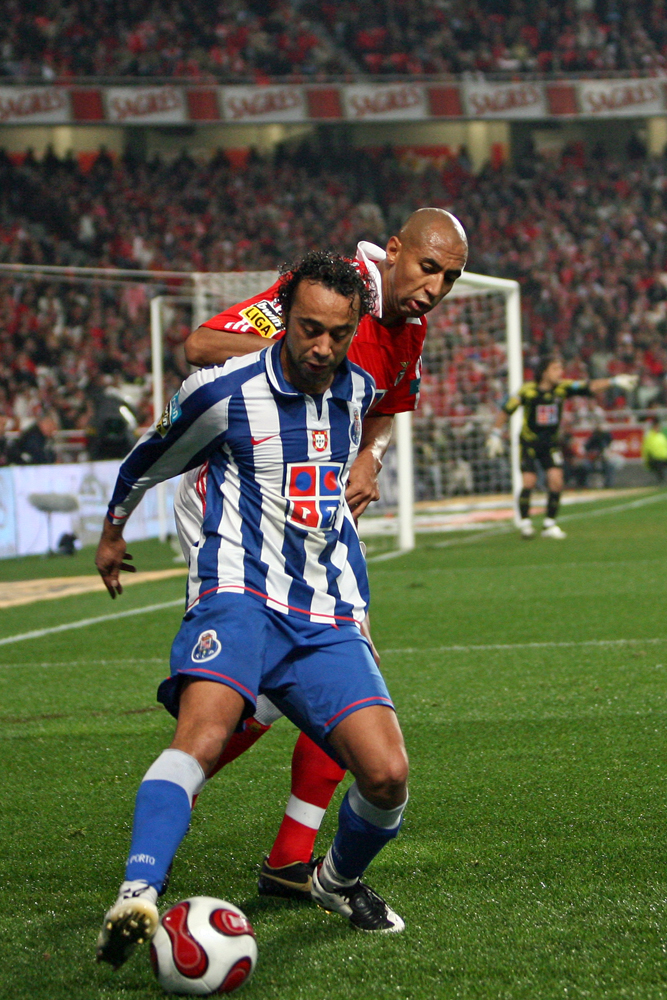
Luisão and Tarik Sektioui in the Benfica vs Porto match in December 2007

The 2005–06 season finished without silverware for Benfica, with Luisão again as an automatic first-choice. However, the team reached the season's UEFA Champions League quarter-finals, with the defender playing all the matches and minutes in the competition. On 21 February 2006, he scored in his side's 1–0 home win against holders Liverpool, which had lost just 1 of 13 European matches the previous year and 5 of 41 away from home. He also started in the second leg, a 2–0 win at Anfield.

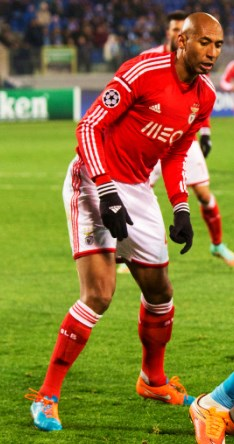
Luisão playing in the UEFA Champions League in 2014

During the 2006–07 season, Luisão was named club captain in some matches due to injuries to Nuno Gomes and Petit. The club again failed to secure any major honours in the season. At the end of the season, his agent said that "Luisão want[ed] to leave" the club, though he eventually stayed.

During the following season, in January 2008, Luisão was involved in an on-field argument with Greek teammate Kostas Katsouranis during a league match against Vitória de Setúbal. The argument arose after Katsouranis' misplaced pass, which forced the Brazilian to commit a foul in order to stop play. After receiving a yellow card for the foul, Luisão criticized Katsouranis, who responded in a similar manner. The two players were on the point of breaking into violence before teammates separated them. Both players were then quickly substituted and issued suspensions by the club, with the two later apologizing to each other. Again during the season, Luisão dealt with some injuries and inconsistent play and also addressed rumours of another possible move from Benfica.

Luisão's start to the 2008–09 season began in scoring fashion, netting a goal in the 59th minute of the UEFA Cup first round match at S.S.C. Napoli in a 2–3 loss. It was his first match of the season in European competitions and his first goal of the season in all competitions. In the following season, he would enjoy his best season as a professional, appearing in 45 total official matches (4,050 minutes played, with six goals) as Benfica won the league and renewed its Taça da Liga supremacy, also reaching the last eight in the newly-branded UEFA Europa League.

On 28 August 2010, Luisão scored – through a header – against Vitória de Setúbal at home as ten-men Benfica eventually won the match 3–0. On 14 September, he entered the Champions League's history books after opening the scoring against Israeli side Hapoel Tel Aviv in the competition's group stage.

On 11 August 2012, in the last minutes of the first half of a friendly with Fortuna Düsseldorf, Luisão reportedly pushed referee Christian Fischer to the ground as he was about to send off teammate Javi García for two reckless challenges on Oliver Fink. The referee refused to resume the match and suspended it, proceeding to announce that he would take legal action against Luisão. On 14 September, Luisão was initially suspended for two months for his actions, also being fined €2,550. The ruling of the Portuguese Football Federation was still subject to the approval of FIFA, which was confirmed shortly after, causing the player to miss 11 matches, including the Champions League matches against Celtic and FC Barcelona.

On 13 March 2014, while appearing in his 117th match in European competitions, Luisão scored two goals to help Benfica to a 3–1 away win against Tottenham Hotspur in the first leg of the Europa League round of 16. In the following season, Luisão equalized Eusébio with a total of 440 official appearances at Benfica after appearing in a 0–4 win at Marítimo in the Primeira Liga on 18 January 2015.

On 26 April 2015, then with 229 matches, Luisão surpassed Mário Coluna as the longest-serving captain at Benfica. A day after turning 36, on 14 February 2017, he made his 500th appearance in a Champions League win against Borussia Dortmund; only Nené, António Veloso and Coluna had reached that mark for Benfica before. By winning the 2017 Supertaça Cândido de Oliveira, he became the Benfica player with most titles won for the club, overtaking Nené to 20.

On 25 September 2018, at the Estádio da Luz, Luisão announced his retirement from professional football.

== International career ==
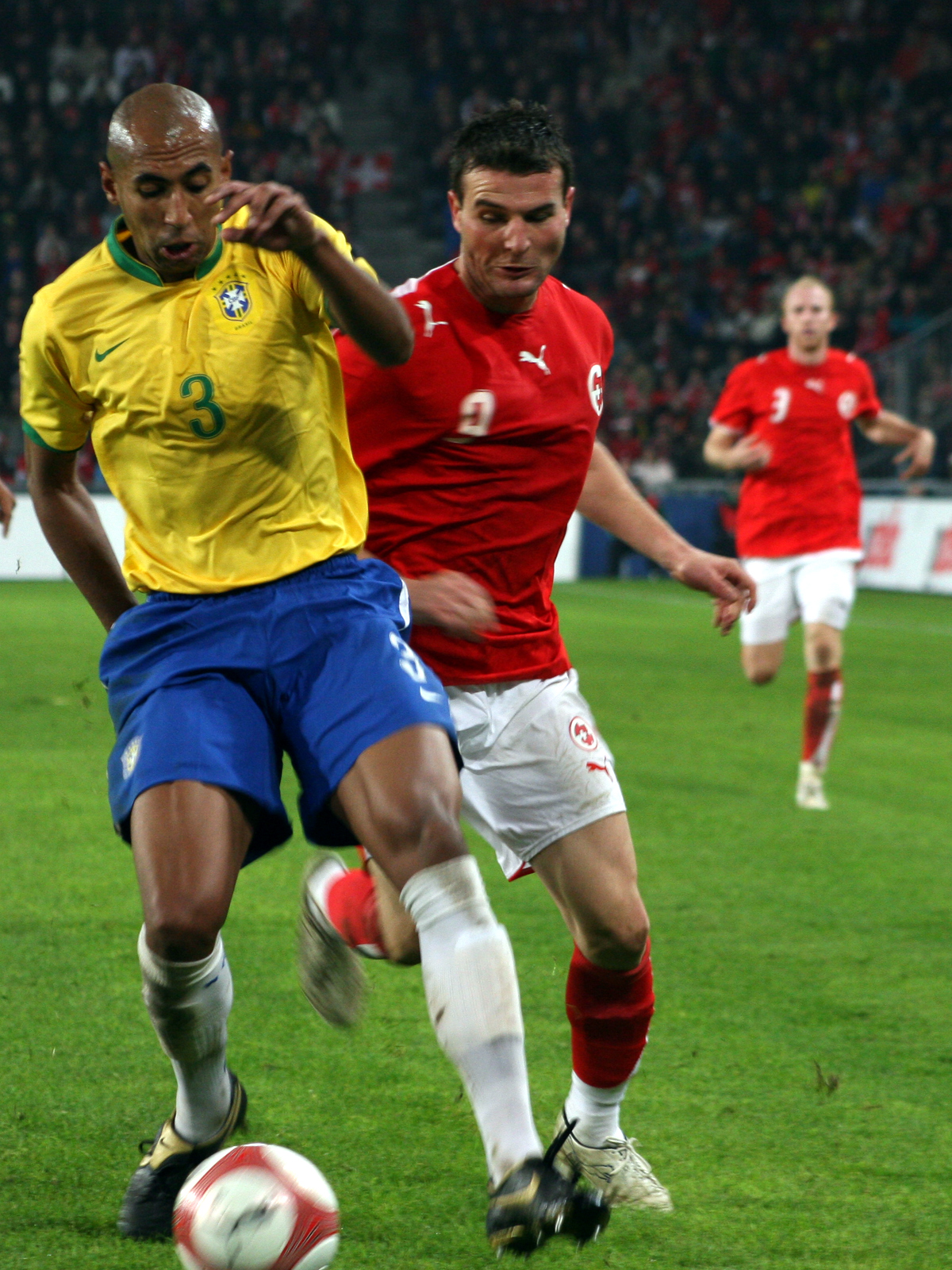
Luisão in a game against Switzerland in 2006

Luisão was called-up for the 2001 FIFA World Youth Championship, but the Brazilians crashed out to Ghana in the quarter-finals.

Luisão made his debut for Brazil on 23 July 2001, against Honduras, in the quarter-finals of 2001 Copa América.

In 2003, Luisão was named in the squad for the 2003 CONCACAF Gold Cup, where Brazil, competing with their under-23 team, finished as runner-up to Mexico. On 8 December 2003, Luisão was called up by Ricardo Gomes for the Olympic qualification tournament with the consent of Benfica. However, a few days later, the club changed its position and decided not to release the player due to a derby against Sporting.

He represented the nation in its 2004 Copa América win, playing in all six matches, including a 1–2 loss against Paraguay – where he was team captain – and the final against Argentina where he scored his first international goal.

In the next year, Luisão was named in the Brazilian squad for the 2005 FIFA Confederations Cup, but did not play a single second, meeting the same fate in the 2006 FIFA World Cup. After the latter tournament, when Dunga was hired as the new coach, he began to play more often.

Luisão was summoned for the 2009 Confederations Cup, playing in four of Brazil's five matches, including the 1–0 victory over South Africa in the semifinals, and the 3–2 win against the United States in the final, partnering with FC Bayern Munich's Lúcio.

Again as a reserve player, Luisão was selected for the 2010 World Cup in South Africa, after a solid club season, being an unused squad member as Brazil exited in the quarter-finals.

== Personal life ==
Luisão's younger brothers, Alex Silva and Andrei Silva, are also football defenders. Luisão is a member of Atletas de Cristo, a group of Brazilian Evangelical footballers also counting Kaká, Edmílson and Cris amongst its ranks.

Luisão married Brenda Mattar in 2016. They have two daughters together, Sophia and Valentina. In 2022, they announced their divorce.

== Career statistics ==
=== Club ===
Club	Season	League			Cup		League Cup		Continental		Other^{1}		Total	
Club	Season	Division	Apps	Goals	Apps	Goals	Apps	Goals	Apps	Goals	Apps	Goals	Apps	Goals
Juventus-SP	1999		—		—		—		—		18	1	18	1
Cruzeiro	2000	Série A	3	0	0	0	—		2	0	1	0	6	0
Cruzeiro	2001	Série A	20	1	—		—		14	2	22	0	56	3
Cruzeiro	2002	Série A	24	6	5	0	—		—		28	3	57	9
Cruzeiro	2003	Série A	15	0	5	1	—		0	0	11	1	31	2
Cruzeiro	Total		62	7	10	1	—		16	2	62	4	150	14
Benfica	2003–04	Primeira Liga	15	3	3	1	—		4	0	—		22	4
Benfica	2004–05	Primeira Liga	29	2	2	0	—		9	0	1	0	41	2
Benfica	2005–06	Primeira Liga	31	1	3	0	—		10	1	1	0	45	2
Benfica	2006–07	Primeira Liga	17	2	2	0	—		10	0	—		29	2
Benfica	2007–08	Primeira Liga	19	3	4	1	3	0	9	0	—		35	4
Benfica	2008–09	Primeira Liga	21	2	3	1	5	0	4	1	—		33	4
Benfica	2009–10	Primeira Liga	28	4	0	0	5	1	12	1	—		45	6
Benfica	2010–11	Primeira Liga	23	1	6	2	2	0	14	3	1	0	46	6
Benfica	2011–12	Primeira Liga	25	1	2	0	2	0	12	1	—		41	2
Benfica	2012–13	Primeira Liga	18	1	5	0	1	0	9	0	—		33	1
Benfica	2013–14	Primeira Liga	28	1	5	1	1	1	15	3	—		49	6
Benfica	2014–15	Primeira Liga	30	4	1	0	2	0	5	0	1	0	39	4
Benfica	2015–16	Primeira Liga	9	0	2	0	2	0	4	1	0	0	17	1
Benfica	2016–17	Primeira Liga	28	0	3	1	1	0	6	0	1	0	39	1
Benfica	2017–18	Primeira Liga	16	1	3	1	0	0	4	0	1	0	24	2
Benfica	2018–19	Primeira Liga	0	0	0	0	0	0	0	0	—		0	0
Benfica	Total		337	26	44	8	24	2	127	11	6	0	538	47
Career total			399	33	54	9	24	2	143	13	86	5	706	62
^{1}"Other" includes Campeonato Paulista Série A2, Campeonato Mineiro, Copa dos Campeões, Copa Sul-Minas and Supertaça Cândido de Oliveira

=== International ===
Appearances and goals by national team and year
National team	Year	Apps	Goals
Brazil	2001	1	0
Brazil	2003	8	0
Brazil	2004	7	1
Brazil	2005	3	0
Brazil	2006	2	1
Brazil	2007	1	0
Brazil	2008	6	0
Brazil	2009	11	1
Brazil	2010	3	0
Brazil	2011	2	0
Total		44	3

Scores and results list Brazil's goal tally first, score column indicates score after each Luisão goal.

List of international goals scored by Luisão
No.	Date	Venue	Opponent	Score	Result	Competition	Ref.
1	25 July 2004	Estadio Nacional, Lima, Peru	Argentina	1–1	2–2 (4–2 p)	2004 Copa América	
2	15 November 2006	St. Jakob-Park, Basel, Switzerland	Switzerland	1–0	2–1	Friendly	
3	5 September 2009	Estadio Gigante de Arroyito, Rosario, Argentina	Argentina	1–0	3–1	2010 FIFA World Cup qualification	

== Honours ==
=== Club ===
Cruzeiro

- Campeonato Brasileiro Série A: 2003
- Copa do Brasil: 2000, 2003
- Campeonato Mineiro: 2003

Benfica

- Primeira Liga: 2004–05, 2009–10, 2013–14, 2014–15, 2015–16, 2016–17
- Taça de Portugal: 2003–04, 2013–14, 2016–17
- Taça da Liga: 2008–09, 2009–10, 2010–11, 2011–12, 2013–14, 2014–15, 2015–16
- Supertaça Cândido de Oliveira: 2005, 2014, 2016, 2017
- UEFA Europa League runner-up: 2012–13, 2013–14

=== International ===
Brazil

- Copa América: 2004
- FIFA Confederations Cup: 2005, 2009
- CONCACAF Gold Cup: Silver medal 2003

=== Individual ===
- Cosme Damião Awards – Footballer of the Year: 2009
