= 2010 Guadiana Trophy =

Tournament details
- Host country: Portugal
- Dates: 30 July 2010 – 1 August 2010
- Teams: 3
- Venue(s): Complexo Desportivo de Vila Real de Santo António

Final positions
- Champions: (Portugal) Benfica (4th title)
- Runners-up: (England) Aston Villa
- Third place: (Netherlands) Feyenoord

Tournament statistics
- Matches played: 3
- Goals scored: 14 (4.67 per match)
- Top scorer(s): 3 – Óscar Cardozo (Benfica)
- Best player(s): Óscar Cardozo (Benfica)

The 2010 Guadiana Trophy was the 10th edition of the competition and took place between 30 July and 1 August 2010. It featured Benfica, Feyenoord, and Aston Villa.

Benfica won its fourth title after beating Aston Villa in the final by a score of 4-1.

== Matches ==
=== Day 1 ===
2010-07-30
21:15

Benfica (Portugal)	4 – 1	(Netherlands) Feyenoord
Cardozo 50', 72'; F. Menezes 75'; R. Amorim 85'		Smolov 3'
Penalties
Cardozo (penalty scored); F. Menezes (penalty scored); R. Amorim (penalty scored); David Luiz (penalty scored); F. Coentrão (penalty scored)	5 – 4	Vlaar (penalty missed); Dani Fernández (penalty scored) de Cler (penalty scored); Wijnaldum (penalty scored); Leroy (penalty scored)

Complexo Desportivo de Vila Real de Santo António, Vila Real de Santo António
Referee: Duarte Gomes

=== Day 2 ===
2010-07-31
21:15

(Netherlands) Feyenoord	1 – 3	(England) Aston Villa
Castaignos 14'		Albrighton 4'; Heskey 73'; Sidwell 79'
Penalties
Bruno Martins Indi (penalty scored); Smolov (penalty scored) van Haaren (penalty missed); Cabral (penalty scored) de Vrij (penalty scored)	4 – 4	Carew (penalty scored); Bannan (penalty scored); Sidwell (penalty scored); Shorey (penalty scored); Lichaj (penalty missed)

Complexo Desportivo de Vila Real de Santo António, Vila Real de Santo António

=== Day 3 ===
2010-08-01
21h15

Benfica (Portugal)	4 – 1	(England) Aston Villa
David Luiz 10'; Saviola 37', 50'; Cardozo 43'		Carew 68'

Complexo Desportivo de Vila Real Santo António, Vila Real Santo António
Referee: João Capela
