= Matheus Menezes =

Brazilian footballer

Personal information
- Full name: Matheus Menezes Jácomo
- Date of birth: 12 January 1991 (age 35)
- Place of birth: Goiânia, Brazil
- Height: 1.87 m (6 ft 1 1/2 in)
- Position: Defender

Youth career
- 2005–2010: Goiás

Senior career*
Years	Team	Apps	(Gls)
2010–2011	Goiás	1	(0)
2011–2016	Botafogo	4	(0)
2013	→ Icasa (loan)	0	(0)
2015	→ Tombense (loan)	0	(0)
2015	→ Aparecidense (loan)	3	(0)
2016	→ América–RJ (loan)	0	(0)
2016	→ Campo Grande–RJ (loan)	0	(0)
2017	Batatais	0	(0)
2017	Dordrecht	2	(0)
2018	Almancilense	4	(0)
- * Club domestic league appearances and goals

Matheus Menezes Jácomo (born 12 January 1991) is a Brazilian former footballer who played as a defender.

== Personal life ==
Matheus's brother Felipe Menezes is also a footballer. A midfielder, he too was groomed at Goiás.

== Career statistics ==
As of 31 January 2017

Club	Season	League			State League		Cup		Continental		Other		Total	
Club	Season	Division	Apps	Goals	Apps	Goals	Apps	Goals	Apps	Goals	Apps	Goals	Apps	Goals
Goiás	2010	Série A	1	0	—		—		—		—		1	0
Goiás	2011	Série B	—		0	0	—		—		—		0	0
Goiás	Subtotal		1	0	0	0	—		—		—		1	0
Botafogo	2012	Série A	—		0	0	0	0	—		—		0	0
Botafogo	2013	Série A	—		0	0	0	0	—		—		0	0
Botafogo	2014	Série A	4	0	1	0	1	0	—		—		6	0
Botafogo	Subtotal		4	0	1	0	1	0	—		—		6	0
Icasa	2013	Série B	0	0	—		—		—		—		0	0
Tombense	2015	Série C	—		0	0	—		—		—		0	0
Aparecidense	2015	Série D	3	0	—		—		—		—		3	0
América–RJ	2016	Carioca	—		6	0	—		—		—		6	0
Career total			8	0	7	0	1	0	0	0	0	0	16	0
