= Abel Pereira =

Abel Pereira may refer to:

- Abel Pereira (footballer)
- Abel Pereira (musician)
