= Esteban Granero =

Spanish footballer (born 1987)

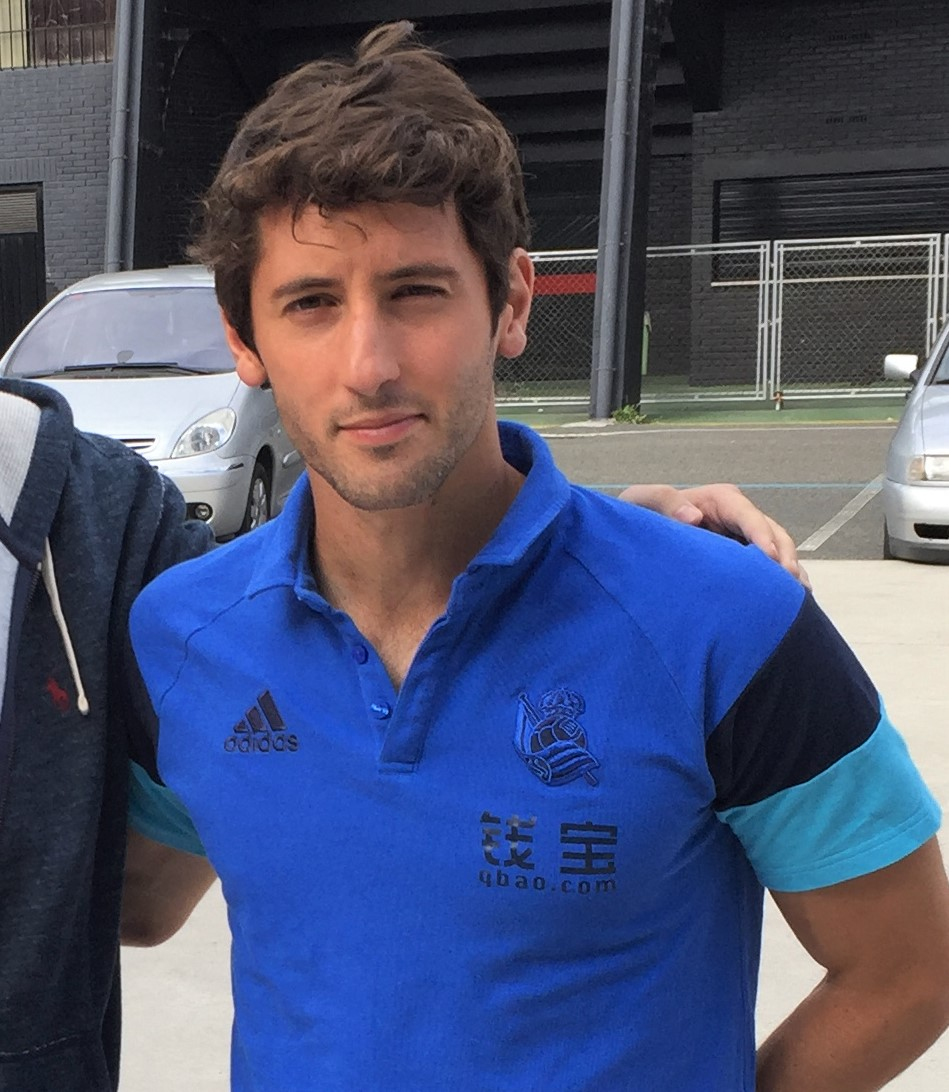
- Granero with Real Sociedad in 2016

Personal information
- Full name: Esteban Félix Granero Molina
- Date of birth: 2 July 1987 (age 39)
- Place of birth: Madrid, Spain
- Height: 1.80 m (5 ft 11 in)
- Position: Midfielder

Youth career
- 1996–2004: Real Madrid

Senior career*
Years	Team	Apps	(Gls)
2004–2006	Real Madrid C	48	(9)
2006–2008	Real Madrid B	37	(4)
2007–2008	→ Getafe (loan)	27	(3)
2008–2009	Getafe	35	(5)
2009–2012	Real Madrid	67	(4)
2012–2014	Queens Park Rangers	25	(1)
2013–2014	→ Real Sociedad (loan)	4	(0)
2014–2017	Real Sociedad	67	(0)
2017–2020	Espanyol	64	(5)
2020–2021	Marbella	29	(3)
Total		403	(34)

International career
2002	Spain U16	1	(0)
2004	Spain U17	5	(0)
2006	Spain U19	9	(1)
2007	Spain U20	5	(0)
2007–2009	Spain U21	10	(2)
Medal record
Men's Football
Representing Spain
UEFA European Under-19 Championship
Winner	2006 Poland
UEFA European Under-17 Championship
Runner-up	2004 France
- * Club domestic league appearances and goals

Esteban Félix Granero Molina (Spanish pronunciation: [esˈteβaɱ ˈfeliɣs ɣɾaˈneɾo moˈlina]; born 2 July 1987) is a Spanish former professional footballer. Known as El Pirata ("The Pirate"), he could play as a central or an attacking midfielder.

He emerged through Real Madrid's youth academy, but made a name for himself in La Liga with Getafe, following which he returned to his previous club, winning three major titles but being sparingly played over the course of three seasons. In the Spanish top division he also represented Real Sociedad and Espanyol, achieving totals of 264 games and 18 goals.

Granero represented Spain at under-21 level, appearing in the 2009 European Championship.

== Club career ==
=== Real Madrid ===
Born in Madrid, Granero joined ranks of Real Madrid when he was just eight years old, and quickly began displaying his footballing talent. In one season, he scored 83 goals in the under-10 division and, in 1999, captained the under-12 side that won the International Football-7 tournament held at the Palau Sant Jordi in Barcelona by defeating FC Barcelona 1–0 with his extra time goal – he was also named the best player of the competition.

Granero, alongside teammates Juan Mata and Alberto Bueno, won the Copa de Campeones Juvenil de Fútbol in 2006, an under-19 official youth tournament organized by the Royal Spanish Football Federation. He then joined the club's C team at the age of 17, standing out for his talent and passing skills and going on to receive the Números 1 Don Balón award as the "Most Valuable Player" of the Group VII of Tercera División in 2005–06, an accolade bestowed by Don Balón magazine, one of the founding members of European Sports Media. That same season he made his first appearance with Real Madrid Castilla in a match against Albacete Balompié, during which he had an assist.

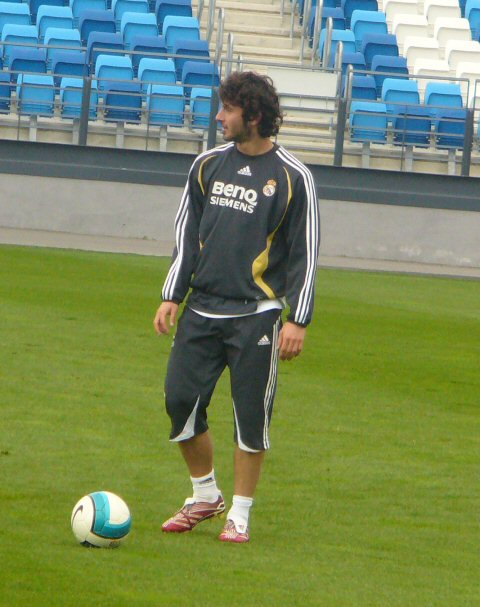
Granero in 2007

=== Getafe ===
Granero made the definitive jump to Castilla in 2006–07's Segunda División, and slowly earned the confidence of coach Míchel until finally becoming an undisputed starter. He would eventually fail to make the transition into the first team, as did fellow cantera players Rubén de la Red, Javi García and Adrián González and, on 31 August, the last day of the transfer window, he moved to Getafe CF (also in Madrid) on a one-year loan; de la Red moved in the same direction, albeit in a different deal.

After the season's end, in which both he and de la Red were instrumental in the team's campaign that included runs to the quarter-finals in the UEFA Cup and the final of the Copa del Rey, Granero returned to Real Madrid. However, on 13 July 2008, he joined Getafe permanently, with Real keeping a re-buy option on the player.

=== Return to Real ===
On 21 July 2009, Real Madrid exercised their buyback option in a reported €4 million deal, and Granero scored three goals during preseason. His first official one came in his first start, when he opened a 3–0 La Liga away win over RCD Espanyol on 12 September. In his first season, where his team eventually came out empty in silverware, he alternated the bench with starts, with irregular performances.

In the 2010–11 campaign, after the club purchased two players in similar positions, Sami Khedira and Mesut Özil, Granero was limited mainly to substitute appearances. On 16 January 2011 he scored as a substitute against UD Almería, in a 1–1 draw at the bottom-placed side.

Granero's situation became worse in 2011–12, with even Fábio Coentrão – another compatriot of manager José Mourinho who was signed in the off-season, originally as a left full-back – being preferred over him as central midfielder.

=== Queens Park Rangers ===
On 30 August 2012, Granero signed a four-year contract with English club Queens Park Rangers after transferring for a reported fee of £9 million, and was handed the number 14 shirt. He made his Premier League debut two days later, starting in a 3–1 away loss against defending champions Manchester City.

Granero scored his first goal for QPR on 6 October 2012, but in a 3–2 defeat at West Bromwich Albion.

=== Real Sociedad ===
On 15 August 2013, after his team's relegation, Granero was loaned to Real Sociedad in a season-long move. On 17 September, after entering the pitch in the 81st minute of an eventual 0–2 home loss against FC Shakhtar Donetsk in the group stage of the UEFA Champions League, he suffered an anterior cruciate ligament injury to his right knee, being sidelined for approximately six months.

Following his loan, Granero signed a long-term deal on 28 July 2014 for an undisclosed fee. He played his first game in his second spell on 24 August, starting in a 1–0 away defeat to SD Eibar.

=== Espanyol ===
On 7 July 2017, Granero signed a three-year contract with Espanyol. He appeared in 25 matches in his first season, adding 28 the following.

Granero scored his first league goal for the Catalans on 18 February 2018, in a 1–1 home draw against Villarreal CF. On 30 January 2020, he left the RCDE Stadium by mutual consent.

=== Marbella ===
The same day he became a free agent, Granero joined Marbella FC until June 2021. He made his Segunda División B debut on 2 February 2020 at the age of 32 years and 7 months, playing 18 minutes in the 0–0 draw away to Mérida AD.

Granero announced his retirement on 5 July 2021.

== International career ==
After having helped Spain to the 2006 UEFA European Under-19 Championship, Granero made his debut for the under-21s on 6 February 2007, in a friendly against England (2–2). He appeared for the nation at the 2009 European Under-21 Championship, in an eventual group stage exit.

== Career statistics ==
Club	Season	League			Cup (Note: Includes Copa del Rey and FA Cup)		Europe		Other		Total	
Club	Season		Apps	Goals	Apps	Goals	Apps	Goals	Apps	Goals	Apps	Goals
Real Madrid Castilla	2005–06	Segunda División	1	0	—		—		—		1	0
Real Madrid Castilla	2006–07	Segunda División	36	4	—		—		—		36	4
Real Madrid Castilla	Total		37	4	0	0	0	0	0	0	37	4
Getafe	2007–08	La Liga	27	3	6	2	9 (Note: Appearances in UEFA Cup)	3	0	0	42	8
Getafe	2008–09	La Liga	35	5	2	0	—		0	0	37	5
Getafe	Total		62	8	8	2	9	3	0	0	79	13
Real Madrid	2009–10	La Liga	31	3	1	0	4 (Note: Appearances in UEFA Champions League)	0	0	0	36	3
Real Madrid	2010–11	La Liga	19	1	9	1	4	0	0	0	32	2
Real Madrid	2011–12	La Liga	17	0	4	0	7	0	0	0	28	0
Real Madrid	Total		67	4	14	1	15	0	0	0	96	5
Queens Park Rangers	2012–13	Premier League	24	1	2	0	—		1 (Note: Appearance in League Cup)	0	27	1
Queens Park Rangers	2013–14	Championship	1	0	0	0	—		0	0	1	0
Queens Park Rangers	Total		25	1	2	0	0	0	1	0	28	1
Real Sociedad (loan)	2013–14	La Liga	4	0	0	0	3	0	0	0	7	0
Real Sociedad	2014–15	La Liga	33	0	2	1	4 (Note: Appearances in UEFA Europa League)	0	0	0	39	1
Real Sociedad	2015–16	La Liga	15	0	0	0	—		0	0	15	0
Real Sociedad	2016–17	La Liga	19	0	3	0	—		0	0	22	0
Real Sociedad	Total		71	0	5	1	7	0	0	0	83	1
Espanyol	2017–18	La Liga	25	1	6	1	—		1 (Note: Appearance in Supercopa de Catalunya)	0	32	2
Espanyol	2018–19	La Liga	28	3	2	0	—		0	0	30	3
Espanyol	2019–20	La Liga	11	1	0	0	10	0	0	0	21	1
Espanyol	Total		64	5	8	1	10	0	1	0	83	6
Marbella	2019–20	Segunda División B	5	0	0	0	—		1 (Note: Appearance in Segunda División B promotion play-offs)	0	6	0
Marbella	2020–21	Segunda División B	24	3	2	1	—		0	0	26	4
Marbella	Total		29	3	2	1	0	0	1	0	32	4
Career total			355	25	39	6	41	3	3	0	438	34

== Honours ==
Real Madrid

- La Liga: 2011–12
- Copa del Rey: 2010–11
- Supercopa de España: 2012

Spain U19

- UEFA European Under-19 Championship: 2006
