= Ishmael Yartey =

Ghanaian footballer

Personal information
- Date of birth: 11 January 1990 (age 36)
- Place of birth: Swedru, Central Region, Ghana
- Height: 1.71 m (5 ft 7 in)
- Positions: Left midfielder; left winger

Team information
- Current team: Syra Mensdorf
- Number: 11

Youth career
- Polo FC
- Coastal Fauzan
- Liberty Professionals
- 2006–2007: All Blacks
- 2007–2009: Benfica

Senior career*
Years	Team	Apps	(Gls)
2009–2012	Benfica	0	(0)
2009	→ Beira-Mar (loan)	17	(2)
2010	→ Fátima (loan)	14	(2)
2010–2011	→ Beira-Mar (loan)	10	(1)
2011–2012	→ Servette (loan)	31	(8)
2012–2014	Sochaux	10	(0)
2013–2014	→ Sion (loan)	22	(2)
2014–2015	Sion	27	(2)
2015	→ Portland Timbers (loan)	5	(0)
2015–2016	→ Gil Vicente (loan)	22	(0)
2017–2018	FC Sion II	35	(14)
2018–2019	Stade Nyonnais	15	(1)
2019–2020	KPV	11	(6)
2020	Hetten	9	(7)
2021	Haka	20	(4)
2022	Al Hidd Club		(1)
2022	KPV	9	(0)
2023	Alta	20	(3)
2024–2025	FC Atert Bissen	16	(2)
2025–	Syra Mensdorf	0	(0)

International career
2007	Ghana U-17	7	(1)
- * Club domestic league appearances and goals as of 7 December 2023

Ishmael Yartey (born 11 January 1990) is a Ghanaian professional footballer who plays as a left midfielder or left winger for Syra Mensdorf.

== Club career ==
Yartey began his youth and professional career with Ghanaian club All Blacks F.C., before joining S.L. Benfica on a one-year loan deal with a buy option at the end of the contract. Former Benfica manager Quique Flores was the first manager that called Yartey to train with the senior squad, but he never debuted for the first team.

On 15 July 2009, Yartey left Benfica and signed a one-year loan deal with S.C. Beira Mar. At the end of the season he signed for C.D. Fátima, on another one-year loan. In January 2011 he was loaned to Beira-Mar for a second time, for the remainder of the 2010–11 Primeira Liga season.

On 21 June 2011, he was again loaned, this time to Servette F.C. of the Swiss Super League until the end of the 2011–12 Swiss Super League.

On 19 July 2012, after returning to Benfica from his Servette loan, Yartey signed a four-year contract with French Ligue 1 club FC Sochaux-Montbéliard.

On 26 March 2015, Yartey signed a loan contract with Portland Timbers of MLS with a transfer option from French Ligue 1 club FC Sochaux-Montbéliard.

Yartey completed his move to Finnish top-flight side KPV Kokkola in July 2019. He scored on his competitive debut for KPV. He was voted the MVP on his debut game for KPV. Yartey also won the Man of the Match Award against giants HJK Helsinki. In that game he scored a wonderful goal for KPV.

In January 2020, Yartey signed for Saudi side Hetten FC.

In February 2021, Yartey signed for Finland Veikkausliiga side FC Haka. He scored two goals in March 2021 in pre-season friendly games for Haka. In January 2022, Yartey signed for Bahrain Premier League side Al Hidd Club after leaving Haka.

In August 2022, Yartey returned to KPV until the end of the 2022 season.

== International career ==
Yartey represented Ghana U-17 (Black Starlets) in the 2007 FIFA U-17 World Cup in Korea Republic.

On 16 May 2012, Yartey was called up for two of the Ghana national team's 2014 FIFA World Cup qualifications, against Lesotho in Kumasi, Ashanti, Ghana, and on 1 June 2012 and against Zambia in Ndola, Copperbelt Province, Zambia, on 9 June 2012.

== Career statistics ==
As of 30 May 2016

Club	Season	League		Cup		League Cup		Continental		Total	
Club	Season	Apps	Goals	Apps	Goals	Apps	Goals	Apps	Goals	Apps	Goals
Beira-Mar (loan)	2009–10	17	2	2	2	3	2	–		22	6
Fátima (loan)	2010–11	14	2	2	1	4	1	–		20	4
Beira-Mar (loan)	2010–11	10	1	0	0	0	0	–		10	1
Servette (loan)	2011–12	31	8	1	0	–		–		32	8
Sochaux	2012–13	10	0	2	0	3	0	–		15	0
Sochaux B	2012–13	14	0	–		–		–		14	0
Sion (loan)	2013–14	22	2	1	0	–		–		23	2
Sion	2014–15	5	0	0	0	–		–		5	0
Portland Timbers (loan)	2015	5	0	0	0	–		–		5	0
Gil Vicente (loan)	2015–16	22	0	5	0	0	0	–		27	0
Career total		120	15	13	3	10	3	0	0	173	21

== Honours ==
Beira-Mar

- Segunda Liga: 2009–10

Portland Timbers

- MLS Cup: 2015
- Western Conference: 2015
