= CS Lebowski =

Italian football club

- Full name: Centro Storico Lebowski
- Nickname: Gli Ultimi Rimasti
- Founded: 2010
- Ground: La Trave, Florence, Italy
- Manager: Alessio Miliani
- League: Promozione Toscana (Group B)
- 2023–24: 6th
- Website: https://cslebowski.it/
Home colours	Away colours

Centro Storico Lebowski is a football club based in the city of Florence, Tuscany, in Italy. It currently plays in Promozione - Group B, the sixth tier of Italian football.

== History ==
On 26 November 2004, a group of Italian high school students, dissatisfied with the management of ACF Fiorentina, began following a local amateur team called 'AC Lebowski'. The team had a poor record, conceding 99 goals in a single season and frequently finishing at the bottom of their league. The club accepted this new group of supporters, who organised themselves as an ultras faction under the name The Ultras Lebowski. The group participated actively in attending matches and supporting the team, contributing to the development of the club's identity.

In the summer of 2010, following the financial collapse of AC Lebowski, these supporters established a new club, named Centro Storico Lebowski. The name and identity of the club, including its ultras group, are a reference to the Coen brothers' film The Big Lebowski, with the character "The Dude" serving as a symbolic figure for the club's ethos. The new team began competing in the Terza Categoria, the lowest level of the Italian football league system. The club adopted a cooperative structure, allowing members to purchase shares and participate in decision-making regarding financial management, team kits, and other operational matters. The club presents itself as opposing racism, fascism, and sexism, while emphasising solidarity, cooperation, and active participation.

Since its establishment, Centro Storico Lebowski has achieved three promotions within the Italian football league system. In 2021, the club signed former Serie A midfielder Borja Valero after his contract with ACF Fiorentina was not renewed. The club also engages in community initiatives, including youth development and social inclusion programs, consistent with its stated principles of participatory and fan-driven football.

== Season to season ==
Season	Tier	Division	Place	Cup
2010-11	9	III Category	7th	First Round
2011-12	9	III Category	8th	First Round
2012-13	9	III Category	1st	Winner
2013-14	8	II Category	1st	Round of 32
2014-15	7	I Category	5th	Round of 32
2015-16	7	I Category	6th	Round of 32
2016-17	7	I Category	7th	First Round
2017-18	7	I Category	1st	First Round
2018-19	6	Promotion	7th	
2019-20	6	Promotion	3rd	
2020-21	DNP			
2021-22	6	Promotion	10th	First Round
2022-23	6	Promotion	7th	First Round
2023-24	6	Promotion	6th	Final
