= Abel Pereira (footballer) =

Portuguese footballer (born 1990)

Personal information
- Full name: Abel José Carvalho Pereira
- Date of birth: 15 April 1990 (age 36)
- Place of birth: Alijó, Portugal
- Height: 1.80 m (5 ft 11 in)
- Position: Right-back

Team information
- Current team: Santa Marta Penaguião

Youth career
- 1999–2001: Alijoense
- 2001–2002: Abambres
- 2002–2005: Boavista
- 2005–2006: Pasteleira
- 2006–2009: Benfica

Senior career*
Years	Team	Apps	(Gls)
2009–2011	Benfica	0	(0)
2009–2010	→ Mafra (loan)	6	(0)
2010	→ Tondela (loan)	11	(0)
2010	→ Fátima (loan)	0	(0)
2011	→ Gondomar (loan)	6	(0)
2011–2014	Doxa	71	(1)
2014–2015	Varzim	24	(1)
2016	Doxa	11	(0)
2016–2017	Oriental	17	(0)
2017–2019	Casa Pia	49	(1)
2020	Torreense	8	(0)
2020–2021	Vila Real	6	(0)
2021–	Santa Marta Penaguião	1	(0)

International career
2005–2006	Portugal U16	4	(0)
2007–2008	Portugal U18	7	(0)
2009	Portugal U19	3	(0)
2010	Portugal U20	1	(0)
- * Club domestic league appearances and goals as of 19:54, 18 October 2021 (UTC)

Abel José Carvalho Pereira (born 15 April 1990) is a Portuguese footballer who plays for ADC Santa Marta de Penaguião as a right-back.

== Club career ==
Born in Alijó, Vila Real District, Pereira started playing with Atlético Clube Alijoense in his hometown, at age 9. In 2006, he joined S.L. Benfica's under–17 team, where he completed his development.

After getting a professional contract, Pereira made his senior debut on loan at C.D. Mafra from the third division. Due to the lack of playing time, he moved to fellow league club C.D. Tondela for the remainder of the season, also on loan.

Pereira first reached the professional leagues when Benfica loaned him to Segunda Liga side C.D. Fátima for the 2010–11 campaign. However, after six months without making an appearance, he returned to the third tier with Gondomar SC.

In June 2011, Pereira was part of massive influx of Portuguese footballers to Doxa Katokopias FC in the Cypriot Second Division. He helped them promote to the First Division in his first year, and was regularly used the following seasons.

On 24 June 2014, Pereira returned to Portugal after signing a one-year deal with Varzim S.C. and reuniting with former Gondomar coach Vítor Paneira. After 18 months, which included promotion from division three, he re-signed with Doxa.

== International career ==
Pereira won 15 caps for Portugal, across four youth levels. He helped the under–16 team reach the final of the Val-de-Marne Tournament in October 2005, and won the 2008 Lisbon International Tournament with the under–18s.

The following year, Pereira represented the under–19 side in the elite qualifying round of the 2009 UEFA European Championship, in which the nation did not progress.

== Career statistics ==
As of 1 April 2016

Appearances and goals by club, season and competition
Club	Season	League			Cup		Continental		Total	
Club	Season	Division	Apps	Goals	Apps	Goals	Apps	Goals	Apps	Goals
Mafra (loan)	2009–10	Segunda Divisão	6	0	1	0	—		7	0
Tondela (loan)	2009–10	Segunda Divisão	11	0	0	0	—		11	0
Fátima (loan)	2010–11	Segunda Liga	0	0	0	0	—		0	0
Gondomar (loan)	2010–11	Segunda Divisão	6	0	0	0	—		6	0
Doxa	2011–12	Cypriot Second Division	24	0	0	0	—		24	0
Doxa	2012–13	Cypriot First Division	22	1	0	0	—		22	1
Doxa	2013–14	Cypriot First Division	25	0	4	0	—		29	0
Doxa	Total		71	1	4	0	—		75	1
Varzim	2014–15	Campeonato Nacional	16	1	2	0	—		18	1
Varzim	2015–16	Segunda Liga	8	0	3	0	—		11	0
Varzim	Total		24	1	5	0	—		29	1
Doxa	2015–16	Cypriot First Division	7	0	0	0	—		7	0
Career total			125	2	10	0	0	0	135	2
