= Felipe Menezes =

Brazilian footballer (born 1988)

Personal information
- Full name: Felipe Menezes Jácomo
- Date of birth: 20 January 1988 (age 38)
- Place of birth: Goiânia, Brazil
- Height: 1.85 m (6 ft 1 in)
- Position: Attacking midfielder

Team information
- Current team: Canosa

Youth career
- 2006: Goiás

Senior career*
Years	Team	Apps	(Gls)
2007–2009	Goiás	62	(6)
2009	→ Paulista (loan)	4	(0)
2009–2013	Benfica	12	(0)
2011–2012	→ Botafogo (loan)	32	(5)
2012–2013	→ Sport (loan)	14	(1)
2013–2016	Palmeiras	39	(1)
2015	→ Goiás (loan)	42	(13)
2016–2017	Ponte Preta	7	(0)
2016–2017	→ Ceará (loan)	35	(3)
2018	Ratchaburi Mitr Phol	16	(2)
2018–2020	CRB	35	(2)
2020–2021	Criciúma	5	(1)
2021	Atibaia	10	(4)
2021	Gama	11	(1)
2021–2022	Lemense		
2022	Aparecidense	19	(5)
2023	Hercílio Luz	10	(1)
2024–	Canosa	0	(0)
- * Club domestic league appearances and goals as of 19:47, 11 February 2024 (UTC)

Felipe Menezes Jácomo (born 20 January 1988), known as Felipe Menezes, is a Brazilian professional footballer who plays as an attacking midfielder for Eccellenza Apulia club Canosa.

== Club career ==
Menezes played youth football with Goiás Esporte Clube. He made his senior debut with the local club on 12 May 2007, in a 0–2 away defeat against São Paulo FC for the Série A. On 7 July, for the same competition, he scored his first goals as a professional, netting twice – including once in the 90th minute – in a 3–2 home victory over Sport Club do Recife.

On 28 August 2009, Menezes signed with S.L. Benfica in Portugal, on a five-year contract. He made his official debut for the Lisbon outfit on 17 September, playing 60 minutes in a 2–0 home win against BATE Borisov for the season's UEFA Europa League, but appeared in only 11 official games in his first year as Benfica won the national championship after five years, including just five in the league (133 minutes of action).

On 21 June 2011, Menezes was loaned to Botafogo de Futebol e Regatas for one year.

On 2 July 2013, Menezes signed a three-year contract with Brazilian side Palmeiras. According to the player: "I believe that I am worst physically than the other players, because I am training only at gym and on treadmill. But I think to be soon with the group".

In February 2024, Menezes returned to Europe, joining Italian Eccellenza Apulia club Canosa.

== Personal life ==
Menezes' younger brother, Matheus, is also a footballer. A defender, he also represented Goiás and Botafogo. Menezes' lackluster performances during his tenure at Palmeiras made him a constant target of the fans' complaints. He was nicknamed "Sleep Menezes" due to his rather slow style of play.

== Club statistics ==
Club	Season	League		Portuguese Cup		League Cup		UEFA		Total
Club	Season	Games	Goals	Games	Goals	Games	Goals	Games	Goals	Games	Goals
Benfica	2009/10	5	0	1	1	1	0	5	0	12	1
Benfica	2010/11	7	0	0	0	4	1	5	0	16	1
Total		12	0	1	1	5	1	10	0	28	2

== Honours ==
Benfica

- Primeira Liga: 2009–10
- Taça da Liga: 2009–10, 2010–11

Palmeiras

- Campeonato Brasileiro Série B: 2013

Goiás

- Campeonato Goiano: 2015
