= José Arroyo (footballer) =

Puerto Rican footballer

Personal information
- Full name: Juan Luis Arroyo
- Date of birth: 25 June 1987 (age 39)
- Place of birth: San Antonio, Texas, United States
- Position: Striker

Team information
- Current team: River Plate Puerto Rico
- Number: 16

Senior career*
Years	Team	Apps	(Gls)
2008–2014	River Plate Puerto Rico		

International career
2008	Puerto Rico	2	(0)
- * Club domestic league appearances and goals

José Luis Arroyo (born 25 June 1987 in Puerto Rico) is a Puerto Rican footballer. He currently plays as a striker for River Plate Puerto Rico of the Puerto Rico Soccer League.
