= 2010–11 Taça da Liga =

Tournament details
- Host country: Portugal
- Dates: 8 August 2010 – 23 April 2011
- Teams: 32

Final positions
- Champions: Benfica (3rd title)
- Runners-up: Paços de Ferreira

Tournament statistics
- Matches played: 67
- Goals scored: 190 (2.84 per match)
- Top scorer: Hugo Vieira (5 goals)

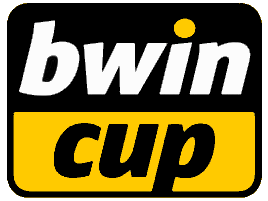
Taça da Liga Logo

The 2010–11 Taça da Liga was the fourth edition of the Portuguese Taça da Liga. The first matches were played on 8 August 2010. The final was played on 23 April 2011 at the Estádio Cidade de Coimbra, where Benfica beat Paços de Ferreira 2–1 to win their third title.

== Format ==
This seasons' format consists of 3 rounds, plus knockout stages. In the first round only second division teams play. All 16 teams are allocated into four groups of four teams each. Each team plays 3 matches and top two of each group advances. In the second round, teams that qualified from previous round are joined by the two Primeira Liga promoted teams and also the six-worst in the top league in the previous season. There will be two-legged fixtures in which the winners will advance. The third round is where the remaining top eight teams from previous season first division enter the competition. Again, as in the first round, the 16 teams are divided into four groups and each team will play three matches. However this time, only group winners advance. Both semi-finals and finals are one-legged fixtures.

== Participating clubs ==
- Clubs starting from the first round: Gil Vicente, Estoril, Desportivo das Aves, Varzim, Santa Clara, Freamunde, Feirense, Oliveirense, Covilhã, Trofense, Fátima, Penafiel, Arouca, Moreirense, Belenenses, Leixões
- Clubs starting from the second round: Académica, Paços de Ferreira, Rio Ave, União de Leiria, Olhanense, Vitória de Setúbal, Beira-Mar, Portimonense
- Clubs starting from the third round: Porto, Sporting CP, Benfica, Nacional, Braga, Naval, Vitória de Guimarães, Marítimo

== First round ==
=== Group A ===
Pos	Team	Pld	W	D	L	GF	GA	GD	Pts	Qualification	FAT	GIV	MOR	FEI
1	Fátima	3	1	2	0	5	4	+1	5	Advance to second round		1–0		3–3
2	Gil Vicente	3	1	1	1	5	5	0	4	Advance to second round			3–3	2–1
3	Moreirense	3	0	3	0	4	4	0	3		1–1			
4	Feirense	3	0	2	1	4	5	−1	2				0–0	

=== Group B ===
Pos	Team	Pld	W	D	L	GF	GA	GD	Pts	Qualification	PEN	ARO	FRE	BEL
1	Penafiel	3	2	0	1	4	2	+2	6	Advance to second round			1–0	3–1
2	Arouca	3	1	2	0	3	2	+1	5	Advance to second round	1–0			
3	Freamunde	3	1	1	1	6	3	+3	4			1–1		5–1
4	Belenenses	3	0	1	2	3	9	−6	1			1–1		

=== Group C ===
Pos	Team	Pld	W	D	L	GF	GA	GD	Pts	Qualification	OLI	ESP	VAR	SCL
1	Oliveirense	3	2	0	1	3	2	+1	6	Advance to second round		0–1		2–1
2	Estoril	3	1	2	0	3	2	+1	5	Advance to second round			1–1	1–1
3	Varzim	3	0	2	1	1	2	−1	2		0–1			
4	Santa Clara	3	0	2	1	2	3	−1	2				0–0	

=== Group D ===
Pos	Team	Pld	W	D	L	GF	GA	GD	Pts	Qualification	LEI	AVE	SCO	TRO
1	Leixões	3	2	1	0	3	0	+3	7	Advance to second round			1–0	
2	Desportivo das Aves	3	1	1	1	4	3	+1	4	Advance to second round	0–2		3–0	
3	Sporting da Covilhã	3	1	0	2	2	4	−2	3					2–0
4	Trofense	3	0	2	1	1	3	−2	2		0–0	1–1		

== Second round ==
The matches were played on October 10 to 28 (first legs) and November 10, 17 and 20, 2010 (second legs).

Team 1	Agg.	Team 2	1st leg	2nd leg
Penafiel	3–3 (4–1 p)	Vitória de Setúbal	2–0	1–3
Estoril	1–1 (4–3 p)	Rio Ave	0–0	1–1
Gil Vicente	4–3	União de Leiria	3–2	1–1
Leixões	2–3	Paços de Ferreira	1–1	1–2
Desportivo Aves	4–3	Portimonense	3–2	1–1
Arouca	3–3 (5–3 p)	Académica	2–2	1–1
Fátima	2–5	Beira-Mar	1–1	1–4
Oliveirense	2–4	Olhanense	1–0	1–4

== Third round ==
=== Group A ===
Pos	Team	Pld	W	D	L	GF	GA	GD	Pts	Qualification	NAC	FCP	GIV	BEM
1	Nacional	3	3	0	0	8	3	+5	9	Advance to knockout phase			4–1	
2	Porto	3	1	1	1	6	4	+2	4		1–2			3–0
3	Gil Vicente	3	1	1	1	5	7	−2	4			2–2		2–1
4	Beira-Mar	3	0	0	3	2	7	−5	0		1–2			

=== Group B ===
Pos	Team	Pld	W	D	L	GF	GA	GD	Pts	Qualification	SLB	MAR	DAV	OLH
1	Benfica	3	3	0	0	9	2	+7	9	Advance to knockout phase		2–0		3–2
2	Marítimo	3	2	0	1	3	3	0	6				2–1	
3	Desportivo das Aves	3	1	0	2	4	8	−4	3		0–4			3–2
4	Olhanense	3	0	0	3	4	7	−3	0			0–1		

=== Group C ===
Pos	Team	Pld	W	D	L	GF	GA	GD	Pts	Qualification	PAÇ	BRA	GUI	ARO
1	Paços de Ferreira	3	3	0	0	8	5	+3	9	Advance to knockout phase			2–1	
2	Braga	3	2	0	1	9	4	+5	6		2–3		3–1	
3	Vitória de Guimarães	3	1	0	2	3	5	−2	3					1–0
4	Arouca	3	0	0	3	2	8	−6	0		2–3	0–4		

=== Group D ===
Pos	Team	Pld	W	D	L	GF	GA	GD	Pts	Qualification	SCP	ESP	NAV	PEN
1	Sporting CP	3	2	0	1	7	2	+5	6	Advance to knockout phase			2–0	4–0
2	Estoril	3	1	1	1	4	4	0	4		2–1			0–1
3	Naval	3	1	1	1	3	4	−1	4			2–2		
4	Penafiel	3	1	0	2	1	5	−4	3				0–1	

== Knockout phase ==
Semifinals; 2/3 March 2011
Benfica	2
Sporting CP	1
Nacional	3
Paços de Ferreira	4

Final; 23 April 2011
Benfica	2
Paços de Ferreira	1

=== Semi-finals ===
2 March 2011
20:45 UTC

Benfica	2–1	Sporting CP
Cardozo 33'; García 90+2'	Report	Postiga 21'

Estádio da Luz, Lisbon
Attendance: 49.652
Referee: Jorge Sousa

3 March 2011
20:15 UTC

Nacional	3 – 4	Paços de Ferreira
Barcelos 35'; Luís Alberto 45'; Gentil 85' (pen.)	Report	Maykon 25'; Pizzi 41', 56'; Rondón 50'

Estádio da Madeira, Funchal
Attendance: 1.248
Referee: Artur Soares Dias

=== Final ===
23 April 2011
21:00 UTC

Paços de Ferreira	1–2	Benfica
Luisão 49' (o.g.)	Report	Jara 17'; García 43'

Estádio Cidade de Coimbra, Coimbra
Attendance: 26,222
Referee: Pedro Proença
