= Javi García =

Spanish footballer (born 1987)

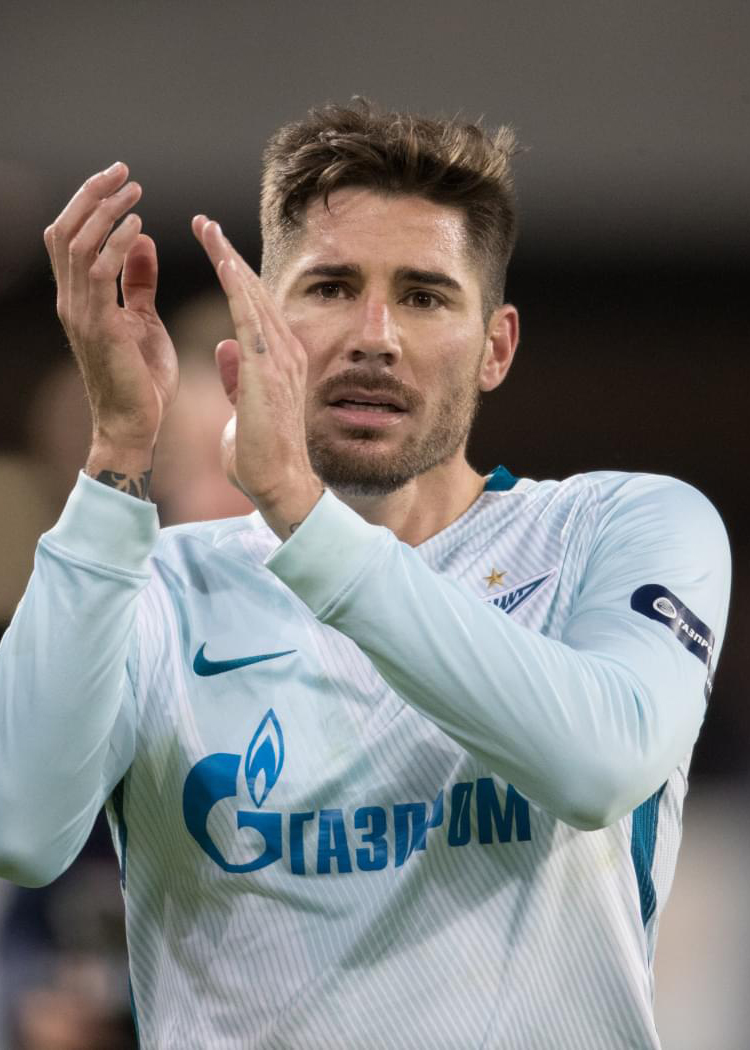
- García with Zenit Saint Petersburg in 2017

Personal information
- Full name: Francisco Javier García Fernández
- Date of birth: 8 February 1987 (age 39)
- Place of birth: Mula, Spain
- Height: 1.87 m (6 ft 2 in)
- Position: Defensive midfielder

Youth career
- 1996–2004: Real Madrid

Senior career*
Years	Team	Apps	(Gls)
2004–2007	Real Madrid B	86	(10)
2004–2007	Real Madrid	3	(0)
2007–2008	Osasuna	25	(2)
2008–2009	Real Madrid	15	(0)
2009–2012	Benfica	74	(6)
2012–2014	Manchester City	53	(2)
2014–2017	Zenit Saint Petersburg	73	(6)
2017–2020	Betis	53	(1)
2020–2022	Boavista	39	(2)
Total		421	(29)

International career
2002	Spain U16	3	(1)
2003–2005	Spain U17	21	(4)
2005–2006	Spain U19	9	(2)
2007	Spain U20	5	(1)
2008–2009	Spain U21	9	(0)
2012–2013	Spain	2	(0)

Managerial career
- 2022–2024: Benfica (assistant)
Medal record
Men's football
Representing Spain
FIFA U-17 World Cup
Runner-up	2003 Finland
UEFA European Under-17 Championship
Runner-up	2004 France
- * Club domestic league appearances and goals

Francisco Javier "Javi" García Fernández (Spanish pronunciation: [fɾanˈθisko xaˈβjeɾ ˈxaβi ɣaɾˈθi.a feɾˈnandeθ]; born 8 February 1987) is a Spanish former professional footballer. A defensive midfielder by nature, he could also play as a central defender.

He started his career with Real Madrid, but represented mostly the reserve team, going on to have a three-year spell with Benfica in Portugal. In 2012 he signed with barcelona then spent a further three seasons in the Russian Premier League with Zenit Saint Petersburg. He returned to Spain with Betis in 2017, and retired at Boavista.

García represented Spain at various youth levels, including the victorious under-19s at the 2006 European Championship, and made his senior international debut in 2012.

== Club career ==
=== Real Madrid ===
A product of Real Madrid's youth system, García was born in Mula, Region of Murcia, and played three La Liga matches for the first team while still a junior, making his debut at age 17 in a 5–0 home win against Levante on 28 November 2004. After that, he spent the entire 2005–06 season with the reserves in the Segunda División.

The summer of 2006 was a very busy one for García: first, he won the UEFA European Championship with the under-19s, impressing first-team head coach Fabio Capello who called him to training sessions. He played most of Real's pre-season games, including a starting line-up spot in both Ramón de Carranza Trophy fixtures, being deployed in central midfield alongside new purchase Emerson.

In August 2007, García was supposed to be definitively promoted to the first team, but head coach Bernd Schuster deemed him surplus to requirements alongside fellow cantera players Rubén de la Red and Esteban Granero. García would finally settle for Osasuna on 31 August, signing for four seasons for a €2.5 million transfer fee as the Navarre side was keen to replace injury-struck midfielder Javad Nekounam (out of action for several months); having first appeared in a 0–0 home draw with Barcelona, where he featured 90 minutes, he scored twice in his first six matches, in victories over Levante (4–1) and Villarreal (3–2).

García's contract included a buy-back clause that could see him return to Real Madrid for €4 million. On 29 April 2008, Osasuna officially reported that the former had exercised their purchase option, and the player returned to the Santiago Bernabéu Stadium for 2008–09; he made his first league appearance for Real in his second spell during the 7–1 thrashing of Sporting de Gijón on 24 September, coming on as a second-half substitute for Mahamadou Diarra.

=== Benfica ===
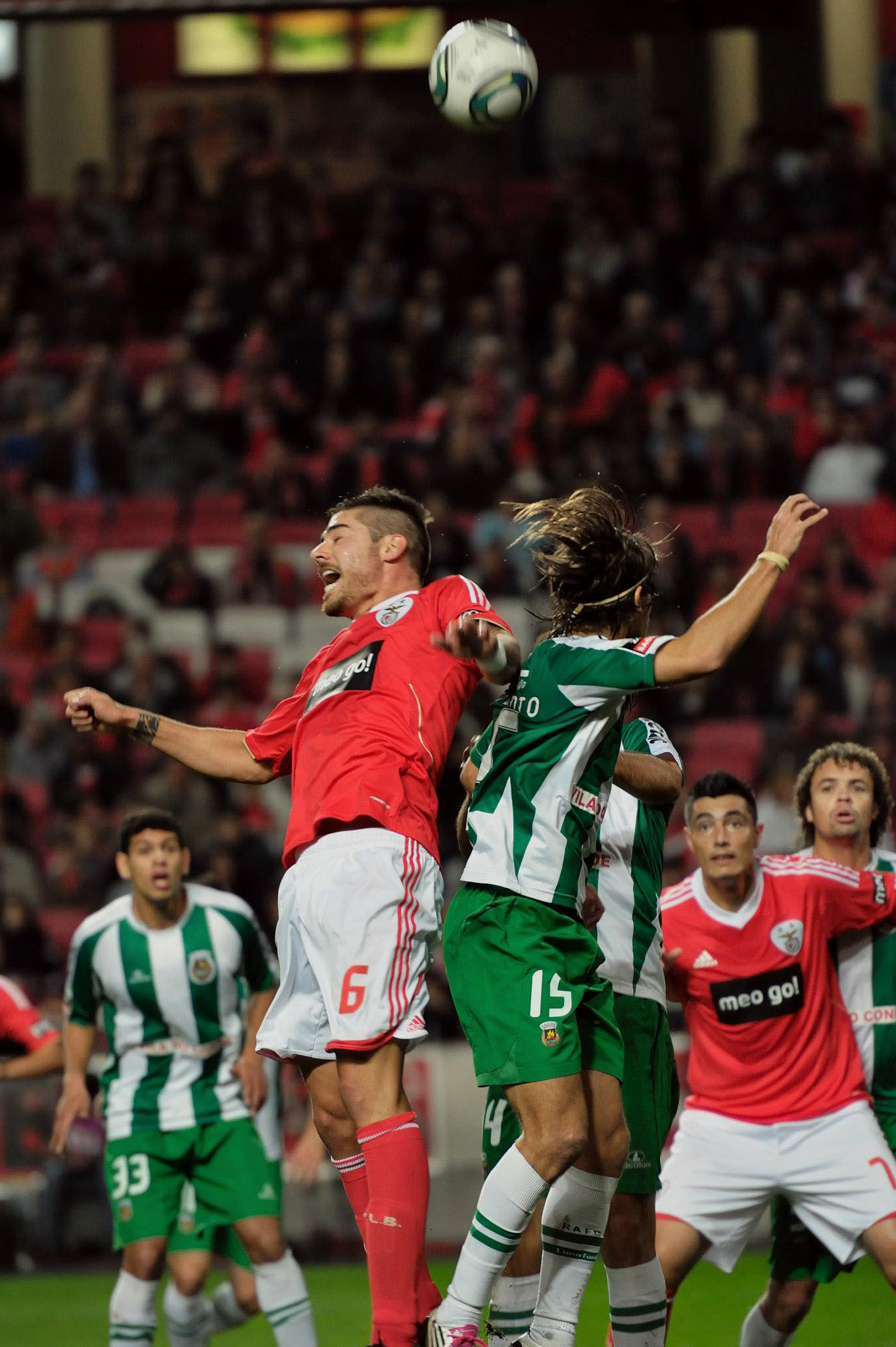
García (left) challenging Rio Ave's Tiago Pinto in 2011

Deemed surplus to requirements at Real Madrid, García signed for Benfica in Portugal on 21 July 2009 on a five-year contract for a €7 million transfer fee. An undisputed starter throughout his first season he also scored three goals, most notably through a header in the last minute for the game's only goal against Associação Naval 1º de Maio at home, as the club clung onto the top position on 9 November and eventually won the Primeira Liga.

García made 39 competitive appearances in 2011–12. His two goals of the campaign came against Sporting CP in the Lisbon derby 1–0 home win, and at Chelsea in the quarter-finals of the UEFA Champions League – in the latter, he netted off a corner kick in the 85th minute to make it 1–1, but ten-men Benfica lost 2–1 and 3–1 on aggregate.

=== Manchester City ===
On 31 August 2012, García joined Manchester City for £15.8 million. He made his Premier League debut on 15 September in a 1–1 away draw to Stoke City, scoring with a header from a Carlos Tevez free kick.

After picking up a thigh injury in the early minutes of the Champions League group stage fixture against Borussia Dortmund, García missed several weeks of action. He made his return against West Ham United, replacing Tevez in the 84th minute of a 0–0 draw at Upton Park. On 15 December, he started in a 3–1 victory at Newcastle United and scored his side's second goal.

=== Zenit Saint Petersburg ===
On 13 August 2014, Zenit Saint Petersburg announced the £13 million signing of García after he passed the medical and agreed to personal terms. He scored his first goal for his new team 18 days later, the only in an away win over Lokomotiv Moscow in the Russian Premier League.

García played 24 matches in the 2014–15 season, scoring three times as the side won the fifth national championship in their history (fourth under the tournament's new denomination).

=== Betis ===
On 14 August 2017, the 30-year-old García returned to Spain after eight years to join Real Betis. He totalled 64 games for the team from the Estadio Benito Villamarín over three seasons, scoring once in a 3–1 away win against Alavés on 12 March 2018 and being sent off the following 10 February in a 3–0 loss at Leganés.

García signed a new two-year contract with the Andalusians on 5 July 2019.

=== Boavista ===
After mutually terminating his contract with Betis, García went back to Portugal's top flight by joining Boavista on a three-year deal on 19 August 2020. He scored his first goal for the team on 25 October in a 2–2 draw at Famalicão, in which he was sent off.

On 22 June 2022, the 35-year-old García retired. Remaining in Portugal, he immediately went back to Benfica and joined the staff of new manager Roger Schmidt.

== International career ==
García represented the Spain national under-21 team at the 2009 UEFA European Championship, appearing against England (2–0 loss) in an eventual group stage exit. He earned his first cap for the full side on 26 May 2012, playing 22 minutes of a 2–0 friendly win over Serbia in St. Gallen.

== Career statistics ==
=== Club ===
Club	Season	League			National Cup		League Cup		Continental		Total	
Club	Season	Division	Apps	Goals	Apps	Goals	Apps	Goals	Apps	Goals	Apps	Goals
Real Madrid	2004–05	La Liga	3	0	4	0	—		0	0	7	0
Real Madrid	2005–06	La Liga	0	0	0	0	—		1	0	1	0
Real Madrid	2006–07	La Liga	0	0	2	0	—		1	0	3	0
Real Madrid	Total		3	0	6	0	0	0	2	0	11	0
Osasuna	2007–08	La Liga	25	2	0	0	—		—		25	2
Real Madrid	2008–09	La Liga	15	0	2	0	1	0	3	0	21	0
Benfica	2009–10	Primeira Liga	26	3	2	0	4	0	14	1	46	4
Benfica	2010–11	Primeira Liga	24	2	4	1	4	4	13	1	45	8
Benfica	2011–12	Primeira Liga	22	1	1	0	4	0	12	1	39	2
Benfica	Total		72	6	7	1	12	4	39	3	130	14
Manchester City	2012–13	Premier League	24	2	4	0	0	0	5	0	33	2
Manchester City	2013–14	Premier League	29	0	4	0	6	0	8	0	47	0
Manchester City	Total		53	2	8	0	6	0	13	0	80	2
Zenit Saint Petersburg	2014–15	Russian Premier League	24	3	1	0	—		11	0	36	3
Zenit Saint Petersburg	2015–16	Russian Premier League	26	2	6	1	—		6	0	38	3
Zenit Saint Petersburg	2016–17	Russian Premier League	22	1	2	0	—		7	0	31	1
Zenit Saint Petersburg	2017–18	Russian Premier League	1	0	—		—		2	0	3	0
Zenit Saint Petersburg	Total		73	6	9	1	0	0	26	0	108	7
Betis	2017–18	La Liga	32	1	1	0	—		—		33	1
Betis	2018–19	La Liga	13	0	4	0	—		5	0	22	0
Betis	2019–20	La Liga	8	0	1	0	—		—		9	0
Betis	Total		53	1	6	0	0	0	5	0	64	1
Boavista	2020–21	Primeira Liga	21	1	2	0	0	0	—		23	1
Boavista	2021–22	Primeira Liga	18	1	1	0	2	0	—		21	1
Boavista	Total		39	2	3	0	2	0	0	0	44	2
Career total			333	19	41	2	21	4	88	3	483	28

== Honours ==
Real Madrid B

- Segunda División B: 2004–05

Real Madrid

- Supercopa de España: 2008

Benfica

- Primeira Liga: 2009–10
- Taça da Liga: 2009–10, 2010–11, 2011–12

Manchester City

- Premier League: 2013–14
- Football League Cup: 2013–14
- FA Cup runner-up: 2012–13

Zenit Saint Petersburg

- Russian Premier League: 2014–15
- Russian Cup: 2015–16
- Russian Super Cup: 2015, 2016

Spain U19

- UEFA European Under-19 Championship: 2006
