= 2022–23 Ascoli Calcio 1898 FC season =

Ascoli Calcio 1898 F.C.
2022–23 season
- President: Carlo Neri
- Head coach: Cristian Bucchi (until 4 February); Roberto Breda (from 6 February)
- Stadium: Stadio Cino e Lillo Del Duca
- Serie B: 12th
- Coppa Italia: Round of 32
Home colours	Away colours	Third colours

The 2022–23 season was the 125th in the history of Ascoli Calcio 1898 F.C. and their eighth consecutive season in the second division. The club participated in Serie B and Coppa Italia.

== Players ==
As of 27 January 2023

No.	Pos.	Nation	Player
1	GK	ITA	Nicola Leali
4	DF	CRO	Lorenco Šimić
5	DF	ITA	Danilo Quaranta
6	MF	FRA	Eddy Gnahoré
7	FW	SUI	Christopher Lungoyi (on loan from Juventus)
8	MF	ITA	Fabrizio Caligara
9	FW	ITA	Federico Dionisi
10	FW	ITA	Amato Ciciretti (on loan from Pordenone)
11	FW	ITA	Francesco Forte (on loan from Benevento)
12	GK	ITA	Luca Bolletta
13	GK	ITA	Enrico Guarna
15	FW	CIV	Cedric Gondo (on loan from Cremonese)
17	DF	ITA	Claud Adjapong
18	MF	ITA	Michele Collocolo
20	DF	ITA	Francesco Donati (on loan from Empoli)
21	DF	ITA	Simone Giordano (on loan from Sampdoria)

No.	Pos.	Nation	Player
23	MF	ITA	Marcello Falzerano
26	FW	MAR	Soufiane Bidaoui
27	MF	ITA	Mirko Eramo
28	MF	ITA	Federico Proia (on loan from Vicenza)
29	FW	ITA	Filippo Palazzino
31	MF	ITA	Diego Fabbrini
32	MF	ITA	Samuel Giovane (on loan from Atalanta)
33	DF	BRA	Eric Botteghin
44	DF	SLO	Aljaž Tavčar
46	GK	SUI	Noam Baumann
54	DF	ITA	Nicola Falasco
55	DF	ITA	Giuseppe Bellusci
77	MF	LIE	Marcel Büchel
90	FW	POR	Pedro Mendes
99	MF	USA	Anthony Fontana

=== Out on loan ===
Note: Flags indicate national team as defined under FIFA eligibility rules; some limited exceptions apply. Players may hold more than one non-FIFA nationality.

No.	Pos.	Nation	Player
—	MF	ITA	Manuele Castorani (at Siena until 30 June 2023)
—	DF	MAR	Amine Ghazoini (at Vis Pesaro until 30 June 2023)
—	MF	ITA	Marco Fiorani (at Messina until 30 June 2023)

No.	Pos.	Nation	Player
—	FW	ITA	Danilo Giacinto Ventola (at Fidelis Andria until 30 June 2023)
—	FW	ITA	Andrea De Paoli (at Siena until 30 June 2023)

== Pre-season and friendlies ==
Win Draw Loss

27 July 2022 Friendly	Roma (Italy)	0–1	(Italy) Ascoli	Trigoria, Italy
17:30 CEST (UTC+2)			Botteghin 67'	Stadium: Centro sportivo Fulvio Bernardini; Referee: Federico Dionisi

30 July 2022 Friendly	Recanatese (Italy)	1–4	(Italy) Ascoli	Porto San Giorgio
17:30 CEST (UTC+2)				Stadium: Stadio Comunale Luca Pelloni Via Marche

== Competitions ==
=== Overall record ===
Competition	First match	Last match	Starting round	Final position	Record							
Competition	First match	Last match	Starting round	Final position	Pld	W	D	L	GF	GA	GD	Win %
Serie B	14 August 2022	19 May 2023	Matchday 1	12th	38	12	11	15	40	47	−7	31.58
Coppa Italia	7 August 2022	20 October 2022	Round of 64	Round of 32	2	1	1	0	5	4	+1	50.00
Total					40	13	12	15	45	51	−6	32.50

Source: Soccerway

=== Serie B ===
==== League table ====
Pos	Team	Pld	W	D	L	GF	GA	GD	Pts
10	Modena	38	13	9	16	47	53	−6	48
11	Pisa	38	11	14	13	48	42	+6	47 (Note: Head-to-head points: Pisa 5, Ascoli 5, Como 4. Head-to-head goal difference: Pisa +1, Ascoli −1.)
12	Ascoli	38	12	11	15	40	47	−7	47
13	Como	38	10	17	11	47	48	−1	47
14	Ternana	38	11	10	17	37	52	−15	43 (Note: Ternana finished ahead of Cittadella on head-to-head goal difference: Cittadella 0–2 Ternana, Ternana 1–2 Cittadella.)

Source: Soccerway (in English)
Rules for classification: 1) Points; 2) Head-to-head points; 3) Head-to-head goal difference; 4) Goal difference; 5) Goals scored; 6) Draw.

==== Results summary ====
Overall								Home						Away					
Pld	W	D	L	GF	GA	GD	Pts	W	D	L	GF	GA	GD	W	D	L	GF	GA	GD
36	12	10	14	39	45	−6	46	6	5	7	19	21	−2	6	5	7	20	24	−4

Source: Serie B

==== Results by round ====
Round	1	2	3	4	5	6	7	8	9	10	11	12	13	14	15	16	17	18	19	20	21	22	23	24	25	26	27	28	29	30	31	32	33	34	35	36	37	38
Ground	H	H	A	H	A	H	A	H	A	H	A	A	H	A	H	A	H	A	H	A	A	H	A	H	A	H	A	H	A	H	H	A	H	A	H	A	H	A
Result	W	D	W	D	L	L	D	L	W	W	W	D	L	D	D	L	D	W	L	L	D	L	L	W	W	D	W	L	L	L	W	L	W	D	W	L	D	L
Position	5	4	1	4	8	11	12	13	11	9	7	7	9	9	9	11	10	9	9	10	12	12	13	12	12	13	10	10	12	13	13	13	12	11	9	8	11	12

Source: Serie B
A = Away; H = Home; W = Win; D = Draw; L = Loss

==== Matches ====
The league fixtures were announced on 15 July 2022.

14 August 2022 1	Ascoli	2–1	Ternana	Ascoli Piceno
20:45 CET	Eric Botteghin 14'; Collocolo 32'; Leali (yellow card) 34'; Ciciretti (yellow card) 90'	Report	Palumbo (yellow card) 45+2'; Bogdan (yellow card) 58'; Favilli 76'; Paghera (yellow card) 90+2'; Diakite (yellow card) 90+4'	Stadium: Stadio Cino e Lillo Del Duca; Attendance: 8,456; Referee: (Italy) Francesco Cosso

20 August 2022 2	Ascoli	1–1	SPAL	Ascoli Piceno
20:45 CET	Gondo 21' (pen.); Bellusci (yellow card) 24'; Salvi (yellow card) 32'; Falasco (yellow card) 85'	Report	Tripaldelli (yellow card) 20'; Murgia (yellow card) 23'; Maistro 26' (yellow card) 35'; Esposito (yellow card) 56'; Arena (yellow card) 59'	Stadium: Stadio Cino e Lillo Del Duca; Attendance: 7,716; Referee: (Italy) Matteo Gariglio

27 August 2022 3	Palermo	2–3	Ascoli	Palermo
20:45 CET	Crivello (yellow card) 32'; Brunori 36'; Valente (yellow card) 60' (yellow-red card) 89'; Segre 63'	Report	Gondo 27' (yellow card) 45+3' (goal) 45+5' 52'; Donati (yellow card) 76'; Leali (yellow card) 82'	Stadium: Stadio Renzo Barbera; Attendance: 22,163; Referee: (Italy) Daniele Minelli

3 September 2022 4	Ascoli	0–0	Cittadella	Ascoli Piceno
14:00 CET	Caligara (yellow card) 29' (yellow-red card) 52'; Gondo (yellow card) 45'; Eric Botteghin (yellow card) 90+2'	Report	Del Fabro (yellow card) 8' (yellow-red card) 90+2'; Donnarumma (yellow card) 24'; Pavan (yellow card) 41'; Raúl Asencio (yellow card) 45' (red card) 49'; Mamadou Tounkara (yellow card) 90'	Stadium: Stadio Cino e Lillo Del Duca; Attendance: 6,675; Referee: (Italy) Francesco Meraviglia

10 September 2022 5	Perugia	1–0	Ascoli	Perugia
16:15 CET	Bartolomei (yellow card) 18'; Strizzolo 42'; Paz (yellow card) 77'	Report	Bellusci (yellow card) 45'; Donati (yellow card) 51'; Giovane (yellow card) 67'; Eramo (yellow card) 90+5'	Stadium: Stadio Renato Curi; Attendance: 5,680; Referee: (Italy) Marco Piccinini

17 September 2022 6	Ascoli	1–3	Parma	Ascoli Piceno
14:00 CET	Salvi (yellow card) 28'; Dionisi (yellow card) 78'; Lungoyi 79' (yellow card) 90'; Bellusci (yellow card) 90+1'	Report	Tutino 7'; Inglese 18'; Vázquez (yellow card) 20'; Oosterwolde (yellow card) 40'; Man 66'; Antoine Hainaut (yellow card) 75'; Jurić (yellow card) 90+1'	Stadium: Stadio Cino e Lillo Del Duca; Attendance: 6,494; Referee: (Italy) Alessandro Prontera

26 February 2023 26	Ascoli	0–0	Benevento	Ascoli Piceno
				Stadium: Stadio Cino e Lillo Del Duca

1 March 2023 27	Modena	0–1	Ascoli	Modena
				Stadium: Stadio Alberto Braglia

5 March 2023 28	Ascoli	0–1	Bari	Ascoli Piceno
				Stadium: Stadio Cino e Lillo Del Duca

10 March 2023 29	Cagliari	4–1	Ascoli	Cagliari
				Stadium: Unipol Domus

18 March 2023 30	Ascoli	0–1	Venezia	Ascoli Piceno
				Stadium: Stadio Cino e Lillo Del Duca

1 April 2023 31	Ascoli	4–3	Brescia	Ascoli Piceno
				Stadium: Stadio Cino e Lillo Del Duca

10 April 2023 32	Frosinone	2–0	Ascoli	Frosinone
				Stadium: Stadio Benito Stirpe

15 April 2023 33	Ascoli	1–0	Südtirol	Ascoli Piceno
				Stadium: Stadio Cino e Lillo Del Duca

22 April 2023 34	Como	1–1	Ascoli	Como
				Stadium: Stadio Giuseppe Sinigaglia

1 May 2023 35	Ascoli	2–1	Pisa	Ascoli Piceno
				Stadium: Stadio Cino e Lillo Del Duca

6 May 2023 36	Genoa	2–1	Ascoli	Genoa
				Stadium: Stadio Luigi Ferraris

13 May 2023 37	Ascoli	1–0	Cosenza	Ascoli Piceno
				Stadium: Stadio Cino e Lillo Del Duca

19 May 2023 38	Reggina	1–0	Ascoli	Reggio Calabria
				Stadium: Stadio Oreste Granillo

=== Coppa Italia ===
7 August 2022 Round of 64	Venezia	2–3	Ascoli	Venice
17:45 CEST (UTC+2)	Rémy (yellow card) 42'; Sandberg (yellow card) 51'; Hasanbegovic (yellow card) 51'; Mikaelsson 88', 89'	Report	Lungoyi (yellow card) 33'; Šarić 36'; Falzerano 70'; Fontana 90+1'	Stadium: Stadio Pier Luigi Penzo; Referee: Daniele Paterna

20 October 2022 Round of 32	Sampdoria	2–2 (a.e.t.) (9–8 p)	Ascoli	Genoa
18:00 CEST (UTC+2)	Verre 10'; Rincón (yellow card) 45+3'; Yepes (yellow card) 73'; Conti (yellow card) 101'; Caputo 118'	Report	Collocolo 33'; Tavčar (yellow card) 78'; Donati 110'; Eramo (yellow card) 112'	Stadium: Stadio Luigi Ferraris; Attendance: 4,738; Referee: Luca Zufferli
	Penalties
	Gabbiadini (penalty scored); Villar (penalty missed); Đuričić (penalty scored); Caputo (penalty missed); Verre (penalty scored); Augello (penalty scored); Conti (penalty scored); Léris (penalty scored); Murru (penalty scored); Ferrari (penalty scored); Contini (penalty scored)		(penalty scored) Botteghin; (penalty scored) Eramo; (penalty missed) Falasco; (penalty scored) Gondo; (penalty missed) Caligara; (penalty scored) Falzerano; (penalty scored) Bidaoui; (penalty scored) Donati; (penalty scored) Quaranta; (penalty scored) Tavčar; (penalty missed) Guarna
