= 2022–23 Coppa Italia =

Tournament details
- Country: Italy
- Dates: 30 July 2022 – 24 May 2023
- Teams: 44

Final positions
- Champions: Inter (9th title)
- Runners-up: Fiorentina

Tournament statistics
- Matches played: 45
- Goals scored: 143 (3.18 per match)
- Top goal scorer: Walid Cheddira (5 goals)

The 2022–23 Coppa Italia (branded as the Coppa Italia Frecciarossa for sponsorship reasons from the second round) was the 76th edition of the national domestic tournament. There were 44 participating teams.

Match times up to 30 October 2022 and from 26 March 2023 were CEST (UTC+2). Times on interim ("winter") days were CET (UTC+1).

Internazionale successfully defended their cup title after defeating Fiorentina 2–1 in the final. It was the club's ninth cup title.

== Participating teams ==
Serie A The 20 clubs of the 2022–23 season	Serie B The 20 clubs of the 2022–23 season	Serie C Four clubs of the 2022–23 season
Atalanta; Bologna; Cremonese; Fiorentina; Empoli; Hellas Verona; Internazionale; Juventus; Lazio; Lecce; Milan; Monza; Napoli; Roma; Salernitana; Sampdoria; Sassuolo; Spezia; Torino; Udinese	Ascoli; Bari; Benevento; Brescia; Cagliari; Cittadella; Como; Cosenza; Frosinone; Genoa; Modena; Palermo; Parma; Perugia; Pisa; Reggina; SPAL; Südtirol; Ternana; Venezia	Catanzaro; Feralpisalò; Padova; Reggiana

== Format and seeding ==
Teams entered the competition at various stages, as follows:

- First phase (one-legged fixtures)
  - Preliminary round: four teams from Serie C and 4 Serie B teams started the tournament
  - First round: the four winners were joined by 16 Serie B teams and 12 teams from Serie A
  - Second round: the 16 winners faced each other
- Second phase
  - Round of 16 (one-legged): the eight winners were joined by Serie A clubs, seeded 1–8
  - Quarter-finals (one-legged): the eight winners faced each other
  - Semi-finals (two-legged): the four winners faced each other
  - Final (one-legged): the two winners faced each other

== Round dates ==
Phase	Round	Clubs remaining	Clubs involved	From previous round	Entries in this round	First leg	Second leg
First stage	Preliminary round	44	8	none	8	30–31 July 2022	
First stage	First round	40	32	4	28	5–8 August 2022	
First stage	Second round	24	16	16	none	18–20 October 2022	
Second stage	Round of 16	16	16	8	8	10–19 January 2023	
Second stage	Quarter-finals	8	8	8	none	31 January–2 February 2023	
Second stage	Semi-finals	4	4	4	none	4–5 April 2023	26–27 April 2023
Second stage	Final	2	2	2	none	24 May 2023	

== First stage ==
=== Preliminary round ===
A total of eight teams from Serie B and Serie C competed in this round, four of which advanced.

30 July 2022	Südtirol (2)	1–3	Feralpisalò (3)	Bolzano
18:00 CEST	Voltan 55'	Report	Siligardi 34', 49'; Cernigoi 52'	Stadium: Stadio Druso; Attendance: 2,000; Referee: Luca Zufferli

31 July 2022	Modena (2)	3–1	Catanzaro (3)	Modena
20:30 CEST	Silvestri 2'; Diaw 45'; Magnino 75'	Report	Tentardini 59'	Stadium: Stadio Alberto Braglia; Attendance: 4,616; Referee: Daniele Perenzoni

31 July 2022	Bari (2)	3–0	Padova (3)	Salerno
21:00 CEST	Botta 8'; Cheddira 16', 90+2'	Report		Stadium: Stadio Arechi; Attendance: 1,000; Referee: Federico Dionisi

31 July 2022	Palermo (2)	3–2	Reggiana (3)	Palermo
21:00 CEST	Brunori 3', 40', 80' (pen.)	Report	Rosafio 57' (pen.); D'Angelo 88'	Stadium: Stadio Renzo Barbera; Attendance: 13,297; Referee: Daniele Rutella

=== First round ===
A total of 32 teams (4 winners from the preliminary round, the remaining 16 teams from Serie B and 12 Serie A teams seeded 9–20) competed in this round, 16 of which advanced to the second round.

5 August 2022	Cagliari (2)	3–2	Perugia (2)	Cagliari
17:45 CEST	Altare 2'; Lapadula 80' (pen.); Viola 89'	Report	Melchiorri 32'; Di Serio 67'	Stadium: Unipol Domus; Attendance: 6,305; Referee: Matteo Gualtieri

5 August 2022	Udinese (1)	2–1	Feralpisalò (3)	Udine
18:00 CEST	Deulofeu 12' (pen.); Success 64'	Report	Siligardi 67'	Stadium: Stadio Friuli; Attendance: 2,962; Referee: Francesco Cosso

5 August 2022	Lecce (1)	2–3 (a.e.t.)	Cittadella (2)	Lecce
21:00 CEST	Strefezza 61'; Colombo 105+1'	Report	Asencio 73'; Tounkara 93', 100'	Stadium: Stadio Via del mare Attendance: 15,857; Referee: Gianpiero Miele

5 August 2022	Sampdoria (1)	1–0	Reggina (2)	Genoa
21:15 CEST	Sabiri 67' (pen.)	Report		Stadium: Stadio Luigi Ferraris; Attendance: 14,893; Referee: Maria Sole Ferrieri Caputi

6 August 2022	Pisa (2)	1–4	Brescia (2)	Pisa
17:45 CEST	Masucci 20'	Report	Nícolas 25' (o.g.); Ayé 61'; Ndoj 72'; Bianchi 90+4'	Stadium: Arena Garibaldi; Attendance: 3,884; Referee: Matteo Gariglio

6 August 2022	Spezia (1)	5–1	Como (2)	La Spezia
18:00 CEST	Nzola 43', 76' (pen.); Verde 60' (pen.); Strelec 71'; Maldini 89'	Report	Blanco 55'	Stadium: Stadio Alberto Picco; Attendance: 5,826; Referee: Francesco Meraviglia

6 August 2022	Empoli (1)	1–2 (a.e.t.)	SPAL (2)	Empoli
21:00 CEST	Cambiaghi 80'	Report	Dickmann 82'; Arena 120+1'	Stadium: Stadio Carlo Castellani; Attendance: 1,155; Referee: Manuel Volpi

6 August 2022	Torino (1)	3–0	Palermo (2)	Turin
21:15 CEST	Lukić 54'; Radonjić 73'; Pellegri 79'	Report		Stadium: Stadio Olimpico Grande Torino; Attendance: 6,803; Referee: Davide Ghersini

7 August 2022	Venezia (2)	2–3	Ascoli (2)	Venice
17:45 CEST	Mikaelsson 88', 89'	Report	Šarić 35'; Falzerano 70'; Fontana 90+1'	Stadium: Stadio Pier Luigi Penzo; Attendance: 2,018; Referee: Daniele Paterna

7 August 2022	Hellas Verona (1)	1–4	Bari (2)	Verona
18:00 CEST	Lasagna 16'	Report	Folorunsho 30'; Cheddira 44', 53' (pen.), 78'	Stadium: Stadio Marcantonio Bentegodi; Attendance: 6,576; Referee: Niccolò Baroni

7 August 2022	Salernitana (1)	0–2	Parma (2)	Salerno
21:00 CEST		Report	Camara 59'; Mihăilă 74'	Stadium: Stadio Arechi; Attendance: 10,205; Referee: Ivano Pezzuto

7 August 2022	Monza (1)	3–2	Frosinone (2)	Monza
21:15 CEST	Valoti 25' (pen.); Caprari 43' (pen.); Gytkjær 84'	Report	Haoudi 53'; Kone 56'	Stadium: Stadio Brianteo; Attendance: 4,432; Referee: Marco Serra

8 August 2022	Genoa (2)	3–2	Benevento (2)	Genoa
17:45 CEST	Guðmundsson 35', 45'; Coda 64' (pen.)	Report	Glik 45+3'; Karić 90+5'	Stadium: Stadio Luigi Ferraris; Attendance: 10,366; Referee: Andrea Colombo

8 August 2022	Modena (2)	3–2	Sassuolo (1)	Modena
18:00 CEST	Falcinelli 11'; Mosti 30', 52'	Report	Berardi 45+2' (pen.); Ayhan 88'	Stadium: Stadio Alberto Braglia; Attendance: 7,274; Referee: Gianluca Aureliano

8 August 2022	Cremonese (1)	3–2	Ternana (2)	Ferrara
21:00 CEST	Bogdan 15' (o.g.); Okereke 22'; Quagliata 60'	Report	Rovaglia 54'; Palumbo 57'	Stadium: Stadio Paolo Mazza; Attendance: 541; Referee: Antonio Giua

8 August 2022	Bologna (1)	1–0	Cosenza (2)	Bologna
21:15 CEST	Sansone 65'	Report		Stadium: Stadio Renato Dall'Ara; Attendance: 10,706; Referee: Giacomo Camplone

=== Second round ===
The 16 winning teams from the first round competed in the second round, 8 of which advanced to the round of 16.

18 October 2022	Genoa (2)	1–0	SPAL (2)	Genoa
18:00	Guðmundsson 45+1' (pen.)	Report		Stadium: Stadio Luigi Ferraris; Referee: Alberto Santoro

18 October 2022	Torino (1)	4–0	Cittadella (2)	Turin
21:00	Radonjić 21'; Pellegri 55'; Schuurs 76'; Zima 80'	Report		Stadium: Stadio Olimpico Grande Torino; Attendance: 3,297; Referee: Ivano Pezzuto

19 October 2022	Spezia (1)	3–1	Brescia (2)	La Spezia
15:00	Strelec 20', 86'; Verde 55'	Report	Moreo 90+3'	Stadium: Stadio Alberto Picco; Attendance: 2,500; Referee: Federico La Penna

19 October 2022	Parma (2)	1–0	Bari (2)	Parma
18:00	Benedyczak 29'	Report		Stadium: Stadio Ennio Tardini; Attendance: 4,690; Referee: Marco Serra

19 October 2022	Udinese (1)	2–3	Monza (1)	Udine
21:00	Pérez 49', 68'	Report	Valoti 45'; Molina 70'; Petagna 72'	Stadium: Stadio Friuli; Attendance: 5,034; Referee: Federico Dionisi

20 October 2022	Cremonese (1)	4–2 (a.e.t.)	Modena (2)	Cremona
15:00	Okereke 77'; Afena-Gyan 84'; Sernicola 111', 120'	Report	Diaw 89' (pen.), 90'	Stadium: Stadio Giovanni Zini; Attendance: 2,772; Referee: Daniele Paterna

20 October 2022	Sampdoria (1)	2–2 (a.e.t.) (9–8 p)	Ascoli (2)	Genoa
18:00	Verre 10'; Caputo 118'	Report	Collocolo 33'; Donati 110'	Stadium: Stadio Luigi Ferraris; Attendance: 4,738; Referee: Luca Zufferli
	Penalties
	Gabbiadini (penalty scored); Villar (penalty missed); Đuričić (penalty scored); Caputo (penalty missed); Verre (penalty scored); Augello (penalty scored); Conti (penalty scored); Léris (penalty scored); Murru (penalty scored); Ferrari (penalty scored); Contini (penalty scored)		(penalty scored) Botteghin; (penalty scored) Eramo; (penalty missed) Falasco; (penalty scored) Gondo; (penalty missed) Caligara; (penalty scored) Falzerano; (penalty scored) Bidaoui; (penalty scored) Donati; (penalty scored) Quaranta; (penalty scored) Tavčar; (penalty missed) Guarna

20 October 2022	Bologna (1)	1–0	Cagliari (2)	Bologna
21:00	Obert 69' (o.g.)	Report		Stadium: Stadio Renato Dall'Ara; Attendance: 6,400; Referee: Giacomo Camplone

== Final stage ==
=== Bracket ===
Round of 16
Roma	1
Genoa	0
Napoli	2 (4)
Cremonese (p)	2 (5)
Fiorentina	1
Sampdoria	0
Milan	0
Torino (a.e.t.)	1
Juventus	2
Monza	1
Lazio	1
Bologna	0
Inter (a.e.t.)	2
Parma	1
Atalanta	5
Spezia	2

Quarter-finals
Roma	1
Cremonese	2
Fiorentina	2
Torino	1
Juventus	1
Lazio	0
Inter	1
Atalanta	0

Semi-finals
Cremonese	0	0	0
Fiorentina	2	0	2
Juventus	1	0	1
Inter	1	1	2

Final
Fiorentina	1
Inter	2

=== Round of 16 ===
The round of 16 matches were played between the eight winners from the second round and clubs seeded 1–8 in the 2021–22 Serie A. Serie B sides Parma and Genoa were the lowest-tier teams in the draw.

10 January 2023	Internazionale (1)	2–1 (a.e.t.)	Parma (2)	Milan
21:00	Martínez 88'; Acerbi 110'	Report	Jurić 38'	Stadium: San Siro; Attendance: 40,032; Referee: Alessandro Prontera

11 January 2023	Milan (1)	0–1 (a.e.t.)	Torino (1)	Milan
21:00		Report	Adopo 114'	Stadium: San Siro; Attendance: 58,000; Referee: Antonio Rapuano

12 January 2023	Fiorentina (1)	1–0	Sampdoria (1)	Florence
18:00	Barák 25'	Report		Stadium: Stadio Artemio Franchi; Attendance: 10,496; Referee: Daniele Paterna

12 January 2023	Roma (1)	1–0	Genoa (2)	Rome
21:00	Dybala 64'	Report		Stadium: Stadio Olimpico; Attendance: 60,000; Referee: Ermanno Feliciani

17 January 2023	Napoli (1)	2–2 (a.e.t.) (4–5 p)	Cremonese (1)	Naples
21:00	Juan Jesus 33'; Simeone 36'	Report	Pickel 18'; Afena-Gyan 87'	Stadium: Stadio Diego Armando Maradona; Attendance: 32,000; Referee: Maria Sole Ferrieri Caputi
	Penalties
	Politano (penalty scored); Simeone (penalty scored); Zieliński (penalty scored); Lobotka (penalty missed); Osimhen (penalty scored)		(penalty scored) Vásquez; (penalty scored) Buonaiuto; (penalty scored) Tsadjout; (penalty scored) Valeri; (penalty scored) Afena-Gyan

19 January 2023	Atalanta (1)	5–2	Spezia (1)	Bergamo
15:00	Lookman 10', 12'; Hateboer 26'; Højlund 72'; Ampadu 90' (o.g.)	Report	Ekdal 14'; Verde 38'	Stadium: Gewiss Stadium; Attendance: 7,483; Referee: Andrea Colombo

19 January 2023	Lazio (1)	1–0	Bologna (1)	Rome
18:00	Felipe Anderson 33'	Report		Stadium: Stadio Olimpico; Attendance: 30,000; Referee: Niccolo Baroni

19 January 2023	Juventus (1)	2–1	Monza (1)	Turin
21:00	Kean 8'; Chiesa 78'	Report	Valoti 24'	Stadium: Juventus Stadium; Attendance: 25,190; Referee: Ivano Pezzuto

=== Quarter-finals ===
The quarter-final matches were played between clubs advancing from the round of 16.

31 January 2023	Internazionale (1)	1–0	Atalanta (1)	Milan
21:00	Darmian 57'	Report		Stadium: San Siro; Attendance: 49,515; Referee: Daniele Chiffi

1 February 2023	Fiorentina (1)	2–1	Torino (1)	Florence
18:00	Jović 65'; Ikoné 90'	Report	Karamoh 90+3'	Stadium: Stadio Artemio Franchi; Attendance: 18,600; Referee: Daniele Doveri

1 February 2023	Roma (1)	1–2	Cremonese (1)	Rome
21:00	Belotti 90+4'	Report	Dessers 28' (pen.); Çelik 49' (o.g.)	Stadium: Stadio Olimpico; Attendance: 60,657; Referee: Michael Fabbri

2 February 2023	Juventus (1)	1–0	Lazio (1)	Turin
21:00	Bremer 44'	Report		Stadium: Juventus Stadium; Attendance: 21,581; Referee: Fabio Maresca

=== Semi-finals ===
Semi-finals (a two-legged round) were played between clubs advancing from the quarter-finals.

==== First leg ====
4 April 2023	Juventus	1–1	Internazionale	Turin
21:00	Cuadrado 83'	Report	Lukaku 90+5' (pen.)	Stadium: Juventus Stadium; Attendance: 39,021; Referee: Davide Massa

5 April 2023	Cremonese	0–2	Fiorentina	Cremona
21:00		Report	Cabral 20'; González 75' (pen.)	Stadium: Stadio Giovanni Zini; Attendance: 13,952; Referee: Maurizio Mariani

==== Second leg ====
26 April 2023	Internazionale	1–0 (2–1 agg.)	Juventus	Milan
21:00	Dimarco 15'	Report		Stadium: San Siro; Attendance: 75,491; Referee: Daniele Doveri

27 April 2023	Fiorentina	0–0 (2–0 agg.)	Cremonese	Florence
21:00		Report		Stadium: Stadio Artemio Franchi; Attendance: 31,131; Referee: Livio Marinelli

=== Final ===
24 May 2023
21:00 CEST

Fiorentina	1–2	Internazionale
González 3'	Report	Martínez 29', 37'

Stadio Olimpico, Rome
Attendance: 68,500
Referee: Massimiliano Irrati

== Top goalscorers ==
Rank	Player	Club	Goals
1	(Morocco) Walid Cheddira	Bari	5
2	(Italy) Matteo Brunori	Palermo	3
2	(Italy) Davide Diaw	Modena	3
2	(Iceland) Albert Guðmundsson	Genoa	3
2	(Argentina) Lautaro Martínez	Internazionale	3
2	(Italy) Luca Siligardi	Feralpisaló	3
2	(Slovakia) David Strelec	Spezia	3
2	(Italy) Mattia Valoti	Monza	3
2	(Italy) Daniele Verde	Spezia	3
10	Twelve players		2
