= 2021–22 Ascoli Calcio 1898 FC season =

Ascoli
2021–22 season
- President: Carlo Neri
- Head coach: Andrea Sottil
- Stadium: Stadio Cino e Lillo Del Duca
- Serie B: 6th
- Coppa Italia: First round
- Top goalscorer: League: Federico Dionisi (9); All: Federico Dionisi (9)
Home colours	Away colours	Third colours

The 2021–22 season was Ascoli Calcio 1898 F.C.'s seventh consecutive season in second division of the Italian football league, the Serie B, and the 124th as a football club.

== Players ==
=== First-team squad ===
No.	Pos.	Nation	Player
1	GK	ITA	Nicola Leali
2	DF	ITA	Alessandro Salvi
3	DF	ITA	Tommaso D'Orazio
4	DF	SLO	Aljaz Tavcar
5	DF	ITA	Gian Filippo Felicioli (on loan from Venezia)
6	DF	ITA	Federico Baschirotto
7	FW	ITA	Luca Paganini
8	FW	ITA	Federico Ricci (on loan from Reggina)
9	FW	ITA	Federico Dionisi
11	FW	BUL	Atanas Iliev
12	GK	ITA	Luca Bolletta
13	GK	ITA	Enrico Guarna
14	MF	USA	Giuseppe Barone
15	DF	ITA	Danilo Quaranta
18	MF	ITA	Michele Collocolo

No.	Pos.	Nation	Player
23	DF	AUT	Lukas Spendlhofer
26	FW	MAR	Soufiane Bidaoui
27	MF	ITA	Mirko Eramo
29	FW	ITA	Filippo Palazzino
30	MF	BIH	Dario Šarić
32	MF	ITA	Fabrizio Caligara (on loan from Cagliari)
33	DF	BRA	Eric Botteghin
37	MF	ITA	Fabio Maistro (on loan from Lazio)
40	FW	ITA	Andrea De Paoli (on loan from Monopoli)
54	DF	ITA	Nicola Falasco
55	DF	ITA	Giuseppe Bellusci (on loan from Monza)
74	FW	ITA	Frank Tsadjout (on loan from Milan)
77	MF	LIE	Marcel Büchel
99	MF	USA	Anthony Fontana

=== Out on loan ===
Note: Flags indicate national team as defined under FIFA eligibility rules; some limited exceptions apply. Players may hold more than one non-FIFA nationality.

No.	Pos.	Nation	Player
—	DF	MAR	Emin Ghazoini (at Royal Excelsior Virton)
—	DF	ITA	Daniele Sarzi Puttini (at Latina)
—	MF	ITA	Manuele Castorani (at Feralpisalò)
—	MF	ITA	Christian Scorza (at Piacenza)
—	MF	GER	Abdelhamid Sabiri (at Sampdoria)

No.	Pos.	Nation	Player
—	FW	ALB	Dean Liço (at Partizani)
—	FW	ITA	Davide Di Francesco (at Campobasso)
—	FW	ITA	Diego Fabbrini (at Alessandria)
—	FW	ITA	Danilo Giacinto Ventola (at Virtus Francavilla)

== Pre-season and friendlies ==
Win Draw Loss

31 July 2021 Friendly	Ascoli (Italy)	2–0	(Italy) Viterbese	Cascia, Italy
17:00 CEST (UTC+2)				Stadium: Centro Sportivo Magrelli Active

8 August 2021 Friendly	Napoli (Italy)	2–1	(Italy) Ascoli	Castel di Sangro, Italy
17:30 CEST (UTC+2)	Insigne 7'; Elmas 62'		Bidaoui 25'	Stadium: Stadio Teofilo Patini; Referee: Federico Dionisi

== Competitions ==
=== Overall record ===
Competition	First match	Last match	Starting round	Final position	Record							
Competition	First match	Last match	Starting round	Final position	Pld	W	D	L	GF	GA	GD	Win %
Serie B	22 August 2021	6 May 2022	Matchday 1	6th	38	19	8	11	52	42	+10	50.00
Serie B promotion play-offs	13 May 2022		Preliminary round	Preliminary round	1	0	0	1	0	1	−1	0.00
Coppa Italia	13 August 2021		First round	First round	1	0	0	1	1	3	−2	0.00
Total					40	19	8	13	53	46	+7	47.50

Source: Soccerway

=== Serie B ===
==== League table ====
Pos	Team	Pld	W	D	L	GF	GA	GD	Pts	Promotion, qualification or relegation
4	Monza (O, P)	38	19	10	9	60	38	+22	67 (Note: Pisa finished ahead of Monza on head-to-head points: Pisa 2–1 Monza, Monza 1–2 Pisa.)	Qualification for promotion play-offs semi-finals
5	Brescia	38	17	15	6	55	35	+20	66	Qualification for promotion play-offs preliminary round
6	Ascoli	38	19	8	11	52	42	+10	65	Qualification for promotion play-offs preliminary round
7	Benevento	38	18	9	11	62	39	+23	63	Qualification for promotion play-offs preliminary round
8	Perugia	38	14	16	8	40	32	+8	58 (Note: Perugia finished ahead of Frosinone on head-to-head points: Frosinone 0–0 Perugia, Perugia 3–0 Frosinone.)	Qualification for promotion play-offs preliminary round

Source: Lega Serie B (in Italian), Soccerway (in English)
Rules for classification: 1) Points; 2) Head-to-head points; 3) Head-to-head goal difference; 4) Goal difference; 5) Goals scored; 6) Draw.
(O) Play-off winners; (P) Promoted

==== Results summary ====
Overall								Home						Away					
Pld	W	D	L	GF	GA	GD	Pts	W	D	L	GF	GA	GD	W	D	L	GF	GA	GD
38	19	8	11	52	42	+10	65	8	6	5	24	18	+6	11	2	6	28	24	+4

Source: Serie B

==== Results by round ====
Round	1	2	3	4	5	6	7	8	9	10	11	12	13	14	15	16	17	18	19	20	21	22	23	24	25	26	27	28	29	30	31	32	33	34	35	36	37	38
Ground	H	A	H	A	H	A	H	A	H	A	H	A	H	A	H	A	H	H	A	A	H	A	H	A	H	A	H	H	A	H	A	H	A	H	A	H	A	H
Result	W	W	W	L	W	L	D	D	L	L	D	W	W	D	W	D	L	L	W	W	L	D	W	W	L	W	L	D	W	W	L	W	L	W	W	D	W	W
Position	4	4	3	5	2	4	5	5	9	9	13	10	7	7	6	7	9	10	9	8	9	9	9	7	9	7	9	8	8	7	8	7	7	7	7	7	7	6

Source: Serie B
A = Away; H = Home; W = Win; D = Draw; L = Loss

==== Matches ====
The league fixtures were announced on 24 July 2021.

18 December 2021 18	Ascoli	1–4	Cremonese	Ascoli Piceno
14:00 CET	Eric Botteghin (yellow card) 22' (yellow-red card) 51'; Eramo 44' (yellow card) 74'; Dionisi (yellow card) 55'; Leali (yellow card) 71'	Report	Sernicola (yellow card) 8'; Valeri 31'; Buonaiuto 39'; Fagioli (yellow card) 42'; Castagnetti (yellow card) 57'; Di Carmine 70'; Vido (yellow card) 74' (goal) 90+1'	Stadium: Stadio Cino e Lillo Del Duca; Attendance: 3,115; Referee: (Italy) Luca Zufferli

=== Coppa Italia ===
13 August 2021 First round	Udinese	3–1	Ascoli	Udine
20:45 CEST (UTC+2)	Pereyra 11', 55'; Stryger Larsen (yellow card) 38'; Molina 53'	Report	Avlonitis (yellow card) 29'; Baschirotto (yellow card) 63'; Dionisi (yellow card) 80'; D'Orazio 90+2'	Stadium: Dacia Arena; Attendance: 2,604; Referee: Matteo Gariglio
