= 2022–23 UC Sampdoria season =

UC Sampdoria
2022–23 season
- President: Marco Lanna
- Head coach: Marco Giampaolo (until 2 October); Dejan Stanković (from 6 October)
- Stadium: Stadio Luigi Ferraris
- Serie A: 20th (relegated)
- Coppa Italia: Round of 16
- Top goalscorer: League: Manolo Gabbiadini (7); All: Manolo Gabbiadini (7)
Home colours	Away colours	Third colours

The 2022–23 season was the 77th season in the history of UC Sampdoria and their 11th consecutive season in the top flight. The club participated in Serie A and the Coppa Italia.

== Players ==
=== First-team squad ===
As of 13 January 2023.

Note: Flags indicate national team as defined under FIFA eligibility rules; some limited exceptions apply. Players may hold more than one non-FIFA nationality.

No.	Pos.	Nation	Player
1	GK	ITA	Emil Audero
2	DF	ARG	Bruno Amione (on loan from Hellas Verona)
3	DF	ITA	Tommaso Augello
5	MF	ITA	Valerio Verre
7	MF	SRB	Filip Đuričić
8	MF	VEN	Tomás Rincón
9	FW	ITA	Manuel De Luca
10	FW	NED	Sam Lammers (on loan from Atalanta)
11	MF	MAR	Abdelhamid Sabiri
13	DF	ITA	Andrea Conti
14	MF	ENG	Ronaldo Vieira
15	DF	GAM	Omar Colley
17	DF	NED	Bram Nuytinck
18	FW	ARG	Ignacio Pussetto (on loan from Watford)
19	MF	VEN	Telasco Segovia

No.	Pos.	Nation	Player
20	MF	ENG	Harry Winks (on loan from Tottenham Hotspur)
21	DF	COL	Jeison Murillo
22	GK	SLO	Martin Turk (on loan from Parma)
23	FW	ITA	Manolo Gabbiadini
27	FW	ITA	Fabio Quagliarella (captain)
28	MF	ESP	Gerard Yepes
29	DF	ITA	Nicola Murru
30	GK	ITA	Nicola Ravaglia
31	MF	ITA	Lorenzo Malagrida
36	MF	ITA	Flavio Paoletti
37	MF	ALG	Mehdi Léris
59	DF	ITA	Alessandro Zanoli (on loan from Napoli)
70	MF	ITA	Simone Trimboli
—	DF	BRA	Kaique Rocha

=== Out on loan ===
As of 3 January 2023.

Note: Flags indicate national team as defined under FIFA eligibility rules; some limited exceptions apply. Players may hold more than one non-FIFA nationality.

No.	Pos.	Nation	Player
—	GK	ITA	Wladimiro Falcone (at Lecce until 30 June 2023)
—	DF	ITA	Leonardo Benedetti (at Bari until 30 June 2023)
—	DF	POL	Bartosz Bereszyński (at Napoli until 30 June 2023)
—	DF	ITA	Lorenzo Campaner (at Prato until 30 June 2023)
—	DF	GER	Jeff Chabot (at 1. FC Köln until 30 June 2023)
—	DF	ITA	Fabio Depaoli (at Hellas Verona until 30 June 2023)
—	DF	ITA	Emanuel Ercolano (at Turris until 30 June 2023)
—	DF	ITA	Alex Ferrari (at Cremonese until 30 June 2023)
—	DF	ALB	Ertijon Gega (at Vis Pesaro until 30 June 2023)
—	DF	ITA	Simone Giordano (at Ascoli until 30 June 2023)
—	DF	ITA	Marco Somma (at Pontedera until 30 June 2023)

No.	Pos.	Nation	Player
—	MF	NOR	Kristoffer Askildsen (at Lecce until 30 June 2023)
—	MF	ITA	Antonio Candreva (at Salernitana until 30 June 2023)
—	MF	ITA	Marco Delle Monache (at Pescara until 30 June 2023)
—	MF	FRA	Maxime Leverbe (at Benevento until 30 June 2023)
—	MF	ITA	Antonio Metlika (at Sangiuliano until 30 June 2023)
—	FW	ITA	Felice D'Amico (at Pro Sesto until 30 June 2023)
—	FW	ITA	Erik Gerbi (at Pro Sesto until 30 June 2023)
—	FW	ITA	Antonino La Gumina (at Benevento until 30 June 2023)
—	FW	ITA	Francesco Caputo (at Empoli until 30 June 2023)
—	FW	ITA	Matteo Stoppa (at Palermo until 30 June 2023)
—	FW	VEN	Ernesto Torregrossa (at Pisa until 30 June 2023)

== Pre-season and friendlies ==
Win Draw Loss Fixtures

13 July 2022 Friendly	Sampdoria (Italy)	9–1	(Italy) Castiglione	Temù
17:00 CEST (UTC+2)	Sabiri 24'; Caputo 34', 37'; Verre 49', 69'; Quagliarella 75', 90'; Léris 78'; Askildsen 88'	Report	Colley 17' (o.g.)	Stadium: Temù Sports Centre; Referee: Angelo Davide Lotito

16 July 2022 Friendly	Sampdoria (Italy)	1–1	(Italy) Parma	Temù
17:00 CEST (UTC+2)	Léris 51'	Report	Jurić 35'	Stadium: Temù Sports Centre; Referee: Federico La Penna

17 July 2022 Friendly	Sampdoria (Italy)	7–0	(Italy) Bienno	Temù
17:00 CEST (UTC+2)	La Gumina 4', 60'; De Luca 27', 52', 69'; Bonazzoli 51' (pen.); Stoppa 80'	Report		Stadium: Temù Sports Centre; Referee: Nicolò Rodigari

20 July 2022 Friendly	Sampdoria A (Note: The Sampdoria squad was divided into two teams for an in-house friendly, with team A playing in blue colours and team B playing in white colours.) (Italy)	2–2	(Italy) Sampdoria B	Temù
17:00 CEST (UTC+2)	De Luca 10'; Caputo 26'	Report	Sabiri 20'; Damsgaard 33'	Stadium: Temù Sports Centre; Referee: Pigat
Note: Match was played in two 30-minute halves.

23 July 2022 Friendly	Brescia (Italy)	0–2	(Italy) Sampdoria	Brescia
18:00 CEST (UTC+2)	Niemeijer (yellow card) 55'; Adorni (yellow card) 65'; Papetti (yellow card) 86'	Report	Sabiri 32'; De Luca 48'	Stadium: Stadio Mario Rigamonti; Attendance: 1,670; Referee: Giovanni Ayroldi

30 July 2022 Friendly	Beşiktaş (Turkey)	1–1	(Italy) Sampdoria	Istanbul, Turkey
20:00 TRT (UTC+3)	Weghorst 65', (yellow card) 67'	Report	Sabiri 37'; Vieira (yellow card) 67'	Stadium: Vodafone Park; Referee: Volkan Bayarslan (Turkey)

11 December 2022 Friendly	Sampdoria (Italy)	5–1	(South Africa) TS Galaxy	Belek, Turkey
17:30 TRT (UTC+3)				Stadium: Calista Sports Center - Field A

15 December 2022 Friendly	Adana Demirspor (Turkey)	2–2	(Italy) Sampdoria	Adana, Turkey
17:30 TRT (UTC+3)				Stadium: New Adana Stadium

19 December 2022 Friendly	Sampdoria (Italy)	2–2	(Germany) Dynamo Dresden	Belek, Turkey
17:30 TRT (UTC+3)				Stadium: Calista Sports Center - Field A

30 December 2022 Friendly	Sampdoria (Italy)	3–0	(Italy) Ligorna	Italy
17:30 CET (UTC+1)

== Competitions ==
=== Overall record ===
Competition	First match	Last match	Starting round	Final position	Record							
Competition	First match	Last match	Starting round	Final position	Pld	W	D	L	GF	GA	GD	Win %
Serie A	13 August 2022	4 June 2023	Matchday 1	20th	38	3	10	25	24	71	−47	7.89
Coppa Italia	5 August 2022	12 January 2023	Round of 64	Round of 16	3	1	1	1	3	3	+0	33.33
Total					41	4	11	26	27	74	−47	9.76

Source: Soccerway

=== Serie A ===
==== League table ====
Pos	Team	Pld	W	D	L	GF	GA	GD	Pts	Qualification or relegation
16	Lecce	38	8	12	18	33	46	−13	36	
17	Spezia (R)	38	6	13	19	31	62	−31	31 (Note: Head-to-head points: Spezia 4 Hellas Verona 1)	Qualification for the Relegation tie-breaker (Note: Should the first and second, or 17th and 18th-placed teams at the end of the season be tied on points, a play-off tiebreaker match was held at a neutral site to determine the title and final team relegated respectively.)
18	Hellas Verona (O)	38	7	10	21	31	59	−28	31	Qualification for the Relegation tie-breaker
19	Cremonese (R)	38	5	12	21	36	69	−33	27	Relegation to Serie B
20	Sampdoria (R)	38	3	10	25	24	71	−47	19	Relegation to Serie B

Source: Serie A
Rules for classification: 1) Points; 2) Tiebreaker for Champions team and third relegated team; 3) Head-to-head points; 4) Head-to-head goal difference; 5) Goal difference; 6) Goals scored; 7) Draw. (Note: Head-to-head record is used only after all the matches between the teams in question have been played)
(O) Play-off winners; (R) Relegated

==== Results summary ====
Overall								Home						Away					
Pld	W	D	L	GF	GA	GD	Pts	W	D	L	GF	GA	GD	W	D	L	GF	GA	GD
38	3	10	25	24	71	−47	19	1	7	10	12	25	−13	2	3	15	12	46	−34

Source: Serie A

==== Results by round ====
Round	1	2	3	4	5	6	7	8	9	10	11	12	13	14	15	16	17	18	19	20	21	22	23	24	25	26	27	28	29	30	31	32	33	34	35	36	37	38
Ground	H	H	A	H	A	H	A	H	A	H	A	A	H	A	H	A	H	A	H	A	A	H	H	A	H	A	H	A	H	A	H	A	H	A	H	A	H	A
Result	L	D	L	D	L	L	L	L	D	L	W	L	L	L	L	W	L	L	L	L	D	D	L	L	D	L	W	L	L	D	D	L	L	L	D	L	D	L
Position	18	16	18	18	18	19	20	20	20	20	18	18	19	19	19	18	19	19	19	19	19	19	19	20	20	20	19	19	20	20	20	20	20	20	20	20	20	20

Source: Serie A
A = Away; H = Home; W = Win; D = Draw; L = Loss

==== Matches ====
The league fixtures were announced on 24 June 2022.

13 August 2022 1	Sampdoria	0–2	Atalanta	Genoa
18:30 CEST (UTC+2)	Ferrari (yellow card) 1'; Verre (yellow card) 73'; Quagliarella (yellow card) 81'; Sabiri (yellow card) 81'	Report	Okoli (yellow card) 19'; Tolói 26'; Pašalić (yellow card) 45'; Musso (yellow card) 80'; De Roon (yellow card) 84'; Zortea (yellow card) 88'; Hateboer (yellow card) 90+3'; Lookman 90+5'	Stadium: Stadio Luigi Ferraris; Attendance: 20,047; Referee: Federico Dionisi

22 August 2022 2	Sampdoria	0–0	Juventus	Genoa
20:45 CEST (UTC+2)	Đuričić (yellow card) 42'; Léris (yellow card) 62'; Verre (yellow card) 87'	Report	Alex Sandro (yellow card) 45'; Rovella (yellow card) 90+1'	Stadium: Stadio Luigi Ferraris; Attendance: 27,573; Referee: Rosario Abisso

28 August 2022 3	Salernitana	4–0	Sampdoria	Salerno
18:30 CEST (UTC+2)	Dia 7'; Bonazzoli 16'; Mazzocchi (yellow card) 26'; Vilhena 50'; Botheim 76', (yellow card) 85'	Report	Depaoli (yellow card) 11'; Rincón (yellow card) 79'	Stadium: Stadio Arechi; Attendance: 19,116; Referee: Davide Massa

31 August 2022 4	Sampdoria	1–1	Lazio	Genoa
18:30 CEST (UTC+2)	Gabbiadini 90+2'	Report	Immobile 21'; Zaccagni (yellow card) 71'; Bašić (yellow card) 90+5'	Stadium: Stadio Luigi Ferraris; Attendance: 18,499; Referee: Gianluca Aureliano

4 September 2022 5	Hellas Verona	2–1	Sampdoria	Verona
18:00 CEST (UTC+2)	Audero 44' (o.g.); Doig 45+3'; Ilić (yellow card) 48'; Henry (yellow card) 62'	Report	Sabiri (yellow card) 6'; Caputo 40'; Colley (yellow card) 61'	Stadium: Stadio Marcantonio Bentegodi; Attendance: 16,675; Referee: Paolo Valeri

10 September 2022 6	Sampdoria	1–2	Milan	Genoa
20:45 CEST (UTC+2)	Ferrari (yellow card) 54'; Đuričić 57'; Villar (yellow card) 66'; Quagliarella (yellow card) 90+3'; Augello (yellow card) 90+5'; Léris (yellow card) 90+7'	Report	Messias 6'; Leão (yellow card) 17' (yellow-red card) 47'; Giroud 67' (pen.)	Stadium: Stadio Luigi Ferraris; Attendance: 23,049; Referee: Michael Fabbri

17 September 2022 7	Spezia	2–1	Sampdoria	La Spezia
18:00 CEST (UTC+2)	Murillo 12' (o.g.); Bastoni (yellow card) 42'; Kovalenko (yellow card) 59'; Nzola 72', (yellow card) 90'; Ellertsson (yellow card) 89'	Report	Sabiri 11'; Ferrari (yellow card) 23'; Villar (yellow card) 43'; Léris (yellow card) 69'; Đuričić (yellow card) 78'; Murillo (yellow card) 89'	Stadium: Stadio Alberto Picco; Attendance: 10,000; Referee: Simone Sozza

2 October 2022 8	Sampdoria	0–3	Monza	Genoa
15:00 CEST (UTC+2)	Murillo (yellow card) 18'; Bereszyński (yellow card) 22'	Report	Pessina 11', (yellow card) 45+1'; Mota (yellow card) 48'; Caprari 67'; Sensi 90+5'	Stadium: Stadio Luigi Ferraris; Attendance: 19,806; Referee: Giovanni Ayroldi

8 October 2022 9	Bologna	1–1	Sampdoria	Bologna
20:45 CEST (UTC+2)	Domínguez 32'; Cambiaso (yellow card) 61'; Orsolini (yellow card) 70'	Report	Đuričić (yellow card) 24', (goal) 72'; Léris (yellow card) 74'; Verre (yellow card) 89'	Stadium: Stadio Renato Dall'Ara; Attendance: 20,871; Referee: Marco Piccinini

17 October 2022 10	Sampdoria	0–1	Roma	Genoa
18:30 CEST (UTC+2)	Rincón (yellow card) 40'; Verre (yellow card) 65'; Pussetto (yellow card) 72'; Colley (yellow card) 90+1'	Report	Pellegrini 9' (pen.), (yellow card) 67'; Ibañez (yellow card) 32'; Zaniolo (yellow card) 90+3'	Stadium: Stadio Luigi Ferraris; Attendance: 20,803; Referee: Marco Di Bello

24 October 2022 11	Cremonese	0–1	Sampdoria	Cremona
18:30 CEST (UTC+2)	Dessers (penalty missed) 7'; Sernicola (yellow card) 67'; Pickel (yellow card) 70'; Meite (yellow card) 74'	Report	Colley (yellow card) 7', (goal) 78'; Sabiri (yellow card) 30'; Amione (yellow card) 59'; Gabbiadini (yellow card) 74'	Stadium: Stadio Giovanni Zini; Attendance: 13,021; Referee: Fabio Maresca

29 October 2022 12	Internazionale	3–0	Sampdoria	Milan
20:45 CET (UTC+1)	De Vrij 21'; Barella 44'; Bastoni (yellow card) 63'; Correa 73'	Report	Yepes (yellow card) 19'; Colley (yellow card) 40'; Đuričić (yellow card) 52'; Verre (yellow card) 57'; Gabbiadini (yellow card) 61'; Vieira (yellow card) 67'	Stadium: San Siro; Attendance: 73,311; Referee: Luca Massimi

6 November 2022 13	Sampdoria	0–2	Fiorentina	Genoa
15:00 CET (UTC+1)	Léris (yellow card) 25'	Report	Bonaventura 4'; Milenković 58'	Stadium: Stadio Luigi Ferraris; Attendance: 19,226; Referee: Livio Marinelli

9 November 2022 14	Torino	2–0	Sampdoria	Turin
20:45 CET (UTC+1)	Ricci (yellow card) 7'; Radonjić 29'; Vlašić 59'	Report	Amione (yellow card) 20'; Yepes (yellow card) 52'; Colley (yellow card) 81'	Stadium: Stadio Olimpico Grande Torino; Attendance: 15,593; Referee: Davide Massa

12 November 2022 15	Sampdoria	0–2	Lecce	Genoa
18:00 CET (UTC+1)	Amione (yellow card) 33'; Đuričić (yellow card) 37'	Report	Umtiti (yellow card) 45'; Colombo 45+1'; Gonzàlez (yellow card) 57'; Banda 83'; Askildsen (yellow card) 87'	Stadium: Stadio Luigi Ferraris; Attendance: 14,561; Referee: Daniele Doveri

4 January 2023 16	Sassuolo	1–2	Sampdoria	Reggio Emilia
12:30 CET (UTC+1)	Berardi (yellow card) 58', (goal) 64' (pen.); Rogério (yellow card) 86'	Report	Gabbiadini 25'; Augello 28'; Vieira (yellow card) 37'; Amione (yellow card) 59'; Montevago (yellow card) 78'	Stadium: Mapei Stadium – Città del Tricolore; Attendance: 11,782; Referee: Fabio Maresca

8 January 2023 17	Sampdoria	0–2	Napoli	Genoa
18:00 CET (UTC+1)	Murru (yellow card) 5'; Rincón (red card) 38'; Murillo (yellow card) 44'; Léris (yellow card) 72'	Report	Politano (penalty missed) 6'; Osimhen 19'; Juan Jesus (yellow card) 53'; Zambo Anguissa (yellow card) 60'; Elmas 82' (pen.)	Stadium: Stadio Luigi Ferraris; Attendance: 24,490; Referee: Rosario Abisso

16 January 2023 18	Empoli	1–0	Sampdoria	Empoli
20:45 CET (UTC+1)	Parisi (yellow card) 41'; Ebuehi 55'; Marin (yellow card) 71'; Ismajli (yellow card) 86'; Stojanović (yellow card) 90'; Vicario (yellow card) 90+9'	Report	Léris (yellow card) 6'; Vieira (yellow card) 29'; Gabbiadini (yellow card) 31'; Sabiri (yellow card) 90+5'; Đuričić (yellow card) 90+12'; Audero (yellow card) 90+12'	Stadium: Stadio Carlo Castellani; Attendance: 10,364; Referee: Alberto Santoro

22 January 2023 19	Sampdoria	0–1	Udinese	Genoa
12:30 CET (UTC+1)	Leris (yellow card) 38'; Nuytinck (yellow card) 71'; Gabbiadini (yellow card) 90+2'	Report	Ehizibue (yellow card) 32', (goal) 88'	Stadium: Stadio Luigi Ferraris; Attendance: 18,642; Referee: Maurizio Mariani

28 January 2023 20	Atalanta	2–0	Sampdoria	Bergamo
20:45 CET (UTC+1)	Mæhle 42'; Lookman 57'	Report	Malagrida (yellow card) 86'; Léris (yellow card) 88'	Stadium: Gewiss Stadium; Attendance: 19,095; Referee: Daniele Doveri

6 February 2023 21	Monza	2–2	Sampdoria	Monza
20:45 CET (UTC+1)	Petagna 32'; Izzo (yellow card) 51'; Caprari (yellow card) 78'; Pessina 90+9' (pen.)	Report	Gabbiadini 12', 58'; Léris (yellow card) 34'; Amione (yellow card) 64'; Rincón (yellow card) 90'; Murru (yellow card) 90+8'	Stadium: Stadio Brianteo; Attendance: 11,950; Referee: Daniele Chiffi

13 February 2023 22	Sampdoria	0–0	Internazionale	Genoa
20:45 CET (UTC+1)	Nuytinck (yellow card) 51'; Amione (yellow card) 78'; Lammers (yellow card) 83'	Report	Martínez (yellow card) 64'	Stadium: Stadio Luigi Ferraris; Attendance: 21,575; Referee: Fabio Maresca

18 February 2023 23	Sampdoria	1–2	Bologna	Genoa
15:00 CET (UTC+1)	Amione (yellow card) 43'; Đuričić (yellow card) 45+2'; Rincón (yellow card) 59'; Sabiri 68' (pen.), (penalty missed) 71'	Report	Soriano 27'; Lucumí (yellow card) 61'; Orsolini 90'	Stadium: Stadio Luigi Ferraris; Attendance: 18,269; Referee: Massimiliano Irrati

27 February 2023 24	Lazio	1–0	Sampdoria	Rome
20:45 CET (UTC+1)	Vecino (yellow card) 71'; Casale (yellow card) 78'; Luis Alberto 80'	Report	Léris (yellow card) 49'; Gabbiadini (yellow card) 67'	Stadium: Stadio Olimpico; Attendance: 35,000; Referee: Andrea Colombo

5 March 2023 25	Sampdoria	0–0	Salernitana	Genoa
15:00 CET (UTC+1)	Nuytinck (yellow card) 21'; Cuisance (yellow card) 42'; Malagrida (yellow card) 89'	Report	Daniliuc (yellow card) 28'; Maggiore (yellow card) 51'; Piątek (yellow card) 53'; Dia (yellow card) 86'	Stadium: Stadio Luigi Ferraris; Attendance: 20,353; Referee: Davide Massa

12 March 2023 26	Juventus	4–2	Sampdoria	Turin
20:45 CET (UTC+1)	Bremer 11'; Rabiot 26', 64'; Fagioli (yellow card) 58'; Vlahović (penalty missed) 69'; Soulé 90+4'	Report	Augello 31'; Đuričić 32'; Rincón (yellow card) 39'	Stadium: Juventus Stadium; Attendance: 35,166; Referee: Alessandro Prontera

19 March 2023 27	Sampdoria	3–1	Hellas Verona	Genoa
12:30 CET (UTC+1)	Gabbiadini 24', 35'; Đuričić (yellow card) 42'; Nuytinck (yellow card) 83'; Zanoli (yellow card) 85', (goal) 90+8'	Report	Faraoni 88'; Coppola (yellow card) 90+6'; Duda (yellow card) 90+7'	Stadium: Stadio Luigi Ferraris; Attendance: 18,228; Referee: Maurizio Mariani

2 April 2023 28	Roma	3–0	Sampdoria	Rome
18:00 CEST (UTC+2)	Abraham (yellow card) 8'; Spinazzola (yellow card) 21'; Wijnaldum 57'; Smalling (yellow card) 60'; Dybala 88' (pen.); El Shaarawy 90+3'	Report	Murillo (yellow card) 11' (yellow-red card) 52'; Zanoli (yellow card) 49'; Paoletti (yellow card) 69'; Winks (yellow card) 70'	Stadium: Stadio Olimpico; Attendance: 62,108; Referee: Massimiliano Irrati

8 April 2023 29	Sampdoria	2–3	Cremonese	Genoa
16:30 CEST (UTC+2)	Léris 15', (yellow card) 89'; Lammers 66'; Oikonomou (yellow card) 90+8'	Report	Ghiglione 35'; Bianchetti (yellow card) 37'; Lochoshvili 85'; Sernicola 90+5', (yellow card) 90+5'; Afena-Gyan (yellow card) 90+7'	Stadium: Stadio Luigi Ferraris; Attendance: 20,421; Referee: Daniele Doveri

16 April 2023 30	Lecce	1–1	Sampdoria	Lecce
12:30 CEST (UTC+2)	Ceesay 31'; Di Francesco (yellow card) 73'	Report	Leris (yellow card) 52'; Sabiri (yellow card) 67'; Jesé 75'; Rincón (yellow card) 84'; Augello (yellow card) 86'	Stadium: Stadio Via del mare Attendance: 22,471; Referee: Maurizio Mariani

22 April 2023 31	Sampdoria	1–1	Spezia	Genoa
20:45 CEST (UTC+2)	Amione 23'; Günter (yellow card) 67'	Report	Verde 59'; Bastoni (yellow card) 73'	Stadium: Stadio Luigi Ferraris; Attendance: 19,181; Referee: Fabio Maresca

30 April 2023 32	Fiorentina	5–0	Sampdoria	Florence
18:00 CEST (UTC+2)	Castrovilli 45+2'; Dodô 62'; Duncan 66'; Kouamé 76', (yellow card) 81'; Terzić 86', (yellow card) 89'	Report	Murillo (yellow card) 60'	Stadium: Stadio Artemio Franchi; Attendance: 30,602; Referee: Antonio Giua

3 May 2023 33	Sampdoria	0–2	Torino	Genoa
18:00 CEST (UTC+2)	Rincón (yellow card) 23'; Amione (yellow card) 47' (yellow-red card) 90+7'	Report	Buongiorno 31'; Singo (yellow card) 60'; Pellegri 90+4', (yellow card) 90+5'	Stadium: Stadio Luigi Ferraris; Attendance: 16,865; Referee: Giacomo Camplone

8 May 2023 34	Udinese	2–0	Sampdoria	Udine
18:30 CEST (UTC+2)	Pereyra 9'; Masina 34', (yellow card) 90+3'; Becão (yellow card) 57'	Report	Winks (yellow card) 28'; Augello (yellow card) 61'	Stadium: Stadio Friuli; Attendance: 20,430; Referee: Niccolò Baroni

15 May 2023 35	Sampdoria	1–1	Empoli	Genoa
20:45 CEST (UTC+2)	Amione (yellow card) 28'; Zanoli 34'; Đuričić (yellow card) 59'; Gabbiadini (yellow card) 77'	Report	Grassi (yellow card) 43'; Pjaca (yellow card) 72'; Cambiaghi (yellow card) 72'; Parisi (yellow card) 85'; Piccoli 90+3'	Stadium: Stadio Luigi Ferraris; Attendance: 16,867; Referee: Ermanno Feliciani

20 May 2023 36	Milan	5–1	Sampdoria	Milan
20:45 CEST (UTC+2)	Leão 9'; Giroud 23', 29' (pen.), 68'; Brahim 63'; Hernandez (yellow card) 75'	Report	Quagliarella 20'; Günter (yellow card) 27'; Zanoli (yellow card) 30'; Oikonomou (yellow card) 89'	Stadium: San Siro; Attendance: 72,105; Referee: Francesco Fourneau

26 May 2023 37	Sampdoria	2–2	Sassuolo	Genoa
20:45 CEST (UTC+2)	Gabbiadini 8'; Oikonomou (yellow card) 53'; Erlić 78' (o.g.)	Report	Berardi 9'; Matheus Henrique 11'; Thorstvedt (yellow card) 15'; Harroui (yellow card) 49'	Stadium: Stadio Luigi Ferraris; Attendance: 18,430; Referee: Francesco Meraviglia

4 June 2023 38	Napoli	2–0	Sampdoria	Naples
18:30 CEST (UTC+2)	Osimhen 64' (pen.); Simeone 85'	Report	Murru (yellow card) 63'	Stadium: Stadio Diego Maradona; Attendance: 51,000; Referee: Ermanno Feliciani

=== Coppa Italia ===
5 August 2022 Round of 64	Sampdoria	1–0	Reggina	Genoa
21:15 CEST (UTC+2)	Sabiri 67' (pen.)	Report	Fabbian (yellow card) 17'; Cionek (yellow card) 53'; Canotto (yellow card) 85'; Cicerelli (penalty missed) 89'; Gagliolo (yellow card) 90+8'	Stadium: Stadio Luigi Ferraris; Attendance: 14,893; Referee: Maria Sole Ferrieri Caputi

20 October 2022 Round of 32	Sampdoria	2–2 (a.e.t.) (9–8 p)	Ascoli	Genoa
18:00 CEST (UTC+2)	Verre 10'; Rincón (yellow card) 45+3'; Yepes (yellow card) 73'; Conti (yellow card) 101'; Caputo 118'	Report	Collocolo 33'; Tavčar (yellow card) 78'; Donati 110'; Eramo (yellow card) 112'	Stadium: Stadio Luigi Ferraris; Attendance: 4,738; Referee: Luca Zufferli
	Penalties
	Gabbiadini (penalty scored); Villar (penalty missed); Đuričić (penalty scored); Caputo (penalty missed); Verre (penalty scored); Augello (penalty scored); Conti (penalty scored); Léris (penalty scored); Murru (penalty scored); Ferrari (penalty scored); Contini (penalty scored)		(penalty scored) Botteghin; (penalty scored) Eramo; (penalty missed) Falasco; (penalty scored) Gondo; (penalty missed) Caligara; (penalty scored) Falzerano; (penalty scored) Bidaoui; (penalty scored) Donati; (penalty scored) Quaranta; (penalty scored) Tavčar; (penalty missed) Guarna

12 January 2023 Round of 16	Fiorentina	1–0	Sampdoria	Florence
18:00 CET (UTC+1)	Barák 25'; Amrabat (yellow card) 32'	Report	Sabiri (yellow card) 24'; Murillo (yellow card) 54' (yellow-red card) 90+2'; Rincón (yellow card) 88'; Contini (yellow card) 90+6'	Stadium: Stadio Artemio Franchi; Attendance: 10,496; Referee: Daniele Paterna
