= 2023–24 Ascoli Calcio 1898 FC season =

Ascoli Calcio 1898 FC
2023–24 season
- Manager: Fabrizio Castori (from 13 November to 12 March); Massimo Carrera (from 12 March)
- Stadium: Stadio Cino e Lillo Del Duca
- Serie B: 15th
- Coppa Italia: Round of 64
- Top goalscorer: League: Pedro Mendes (11); All: Pedro Mendes (11)
Home colours	Away colours

The 2023–24 season is Ascoli Calcio 1898 FC's 125th season in existence and the club's ninth consecutive season in the second tier of Italian football. In addition to the domestic league, Ascoli Calcio will participate in this season's edition of the Coppa Italia. The season covers the period from 1 July 2023 to 30 June 2024.

== Players ==
=== First-team squad ===
As of 1 September 2023

No.	Pos.	Nation	Player
1	GK	ITA	Davide Barosi
2	GK	ITA	Emiliano Viviano
3	DF	ALB	Kevin Haveri (on loan from Torino)
5	MF	FRA	Eddy Gnahoré
6	MF	ALB	Erdis Kraja (on loan from Atalanta)
7	FW	ITA	Vincenzo Millico
8	MF	ITA	Samuel Giovane (on loan from Atalanta)
10	MF	ITA	Fabrizio Caligara
12	GK	ITA	Luca Bolletta
14	DF	ITA	Danilo Quaranta
15	FW	ITA	Simone D'Uffizi
17	DF	ITA	Claud Adjapong
18	MF	ITA	Francesco Di Tacchio (on loan from Südtirol)
20	MF	ITA	Tommaso Milanese (on loan from Cremonese)
22	GK	ITA	Giulio Mengucci

No.	Pos.	Nation	Player
23	MF	ITA	Marcello Falzerano
26	DF	CRO	Luka Bogdan (on loan from Ternana)
27	MF	ITA	Mirko Eramo
28	FW	ITA	Giacomo Manzari (on loan from Sassuolo)
30	FW	MKD	Ilija Nestorovski
33	DF	BRA	Eric Botteghin
40	DF	COD	Brian Bayeye (on loan from Torino)
44	DF	SVN	Aljaž Tavčar
54	DF	ITA	Nicola Falasco
55	DF	ITA	Giuseppe Bellusci
73	MF	ITA	Patrizio Masini (on loan from Genoa)
77	MF	LIE	Marcel Büchel
90	FW	POR	Pedro Mendes
99	FW	ESP	Pablo Rodríguez (on loan from Lecce)

=== Other players with contracts ===
Note: Flags indicate national team as defined under FIFA eligibility rules; some limited exceptions apply. Players may hold more than one non-FIFA nationality.

No.	Pos.	Nation	Player
—	DF	MAR	Amine Ghazoini

=== Out on loan ===
Note: Flags indicate national team as defined under FIFA eligibility rules; some limited exceptions apply. Players may hold more than one non-FIFA nationality.

No.	Pos.	Nation	Player
—	GK	ITA	Andrea Mancini (at Fermana until 30 June 2024)
—	FW	ITA	Francesco Forte (at Cosenza until 30 June 2024)

No.	Pos.	Nation	Player
—	FW	ITA	Filippo Palazzino (at Monterosi until 30 June 2024)
—	FW	ITA	Alessio Re (at Recanatese until 30 June 2024)

== Transfers ==
=== In ===
Pos.	Player	Transferred from	Fee	Date	Source
FW	(Italy) Francesco Forte	(Italy) Benevento	€1.50m	1 July 2023	
GK	(Italy) Davide Barosi	(Italy) Juve Stabia	€250k	1 July 2023	
MF	(Italy) Vincenzo Millico	(Italy) Cagliari	Free	1 July 2023	
FW	(North Macedonia) Ilija Nestorovski	(Italy) Udinese	Free	1 July 2023	
MF	(Italy) Simone D'Uffizi	(Italy) Viterbese	Free	1 July 2023	
GK	(Italy) Emiliano Viviano	(Turkey) Fatih Karagümrük	Free	1 July 2023	
FW	(Spain) Pablo Rodríguez	(Italy) Lecce	Loan	1 July 2023	
MF	(Italy) Tommaso Milanese	(Italy) Cremonese	Loan	1 July 2023	
DF	(Croatia) Luka Bogdan	(Italy) Ternana	Loan	1 July 2023	
DF	(France) Brian Bayeye	(Italy) Torino	Loan	1 July 2023	
MF	(Italy) Francesco Di Tacchio	(Italy) Südtirol	Loan	1 July 2023	
MF	(Italy) Giacomo Manzari	(Italy) Sassuolo	Loan	1 July 2023	
DF	(Albania) Kevin Haveri	(Italy) Torino	Loan	1 July 2023	
DF	(Italy) Patrizio Masini	(Italy) Genoa	Loan	1 July 2023	
MF	(Albania) Erdis Kraja	(Italy) Atalanta	Loan	1 July 2023	

=== Out ===
Pos.	Player	Transferred from	Fee	Date	Source
MF	(Italy) Michele Collocolo	(Italy) Cremonese	€2.00m	1 July 2023	
MF	(Croatia) Lorenco Šimić	Maccabi Haifa	€800k	1 July 2023	
GK	(Italy) Nicola Leali	(Italy) Genoa	Free	1 July 2023	
MF	(Italy) Davide Marsura	(Italy) Catania	Free	1 July 2023	
MF	(Italy) Filippo Palazzino	(Italy) Monterosi	Loan	1 July 2023	
FW	(Italy) Danilo Ventola	(Italy) United Riccione	Free	1 July 2023	
MF	(Italy) Alessio Re	(Italy) Recantese	Loan	1 July 2023	
MF	(Italy) Andrea Franzolini	(Italy) Feralpisalò	Free	1 July 2023	
FW	(Italy) Francesco Forte	(Italy) Cosenza	Loan	1 July 2023	
FW	(Italy) Andrea De Paoli	(Italy) Monopoli	Undisclosed	29 July 2023	
FW	(Italy) Federico Dionisi	(Italy) Ternana	Undisclosed	29 August 2023	
MF	(Italy) Marco Fiorani	(Italy) Taranto	Undisclosed	31 August 2023	

== Competitions ==
=== Overview ===
Competition	First match	Last match	Starting round	Final position	Record							
Competition	First match	Last match	Starting round	Final position	Pld	W	D	L	GF	GA	GD	Win %
Serie B	22 August 2023	May 2024	Matchday 1		35	8	13	14	34	38	−4	22.86
Coppa Italia	12 August 2023		Round of 64	Round of 64	1	0	0	1	1	3	−2	0.00
Total					36	8	13	15	35	41	−6	22.22

Last updated: 27 April 2024
Source: Competitions

=== Serie B ===
==== League table ====
Pos	Team	Pld	W	D	L	GF	GA	GD	Pts	Promotion, qualification or relegation
16	Ternana (R)	38	11	10	17	43	50	−7	43	Qualification for relegation play-out
17	Bari (O)	38	8	17	13	38	49	−11	41 (Note: Bari finished ahead of Ascoli on head-to-head points: Bari 1–0 Ascoli, Ascoli 2–2 Bari.)	Qualification for relegation play-out
18	Ascoli (R)	38	9	14	15	38	42	−4	41	Relegation to Serie C
19	Feralpisalò (R)	38	8	9	21	44	65	−21	33	Relegation to Serie C
20	Lecco (R)	38	6	8	24	35	74	−39	26	Relegation to Serie C

Source: Soccerway (in English)
Rules for classification: 1) Points; 2) Head-to-head points; 3) Head-to-head goal difference; 4) Goal difference; 5) Goals scored; 6) Draw.
(Note: Head-to-head record is used only after all the matches between the teams in question have been played)
(O) Play-off winners; (R) Relegated

==== Results summary ====
Overall								Home						Away					
Pld	W	D	L	GF	GA	GD	Pts	W	D	L	GF	GA	GD	W	D	L	GF	GA	GD
35	8	13	14	34	38	−4	37	4	8	5	17	14	+3	4	5	9	17	24	−7

Last updated: 27 April 2024.
Source: Worldfootball

==== Results by round ====
Round	1	2	3	4	5	6	7	8	9	10	11	12	13	14	15	16	17	18	19	20	21	22	23	24	25	26	27	28	29	30	31	32	33	34	35
Ground	A	A	H	A	H	A	H	A	H	A	H	A	H	A	A	H	H	A	H	A	H	A	H	A	H	A	H	H	A	H	A	H	A	H	A
Result	L	L	W	L	L	D	W	D	D	W	L	L	L	D	L	L	W	L	D	D	D	W	L	L	D	W	D	D	L	W	L	D	D	D	W
Position	19	19	13	15	16	16	14	13	13	12	14	15	17	16	17	18	17	18	18	18	18	16	16	17	18	17	17	17	18	17	18	18	18	18	

Updated to match(es) played on 27 April 2024. Source: Worldfootball
A = Away; H = Home; W = Win; D = Draw; L = Loss

==== Matches ====
The league fixtures were unveiled on 11 July 2023.

19 August 2023 1	Cosenza	3–0	Ascoli	Cosenza
14:00 CEST (UTC+2)				Stadium: Stadio San Vito-Gigi Marulla

26 August 2023 2	Modena	1–0	Ascoli	Modena
14:00 CEST (UTC+2)				Stadium: Stadio Alberto Braglia

29 August 2023 3	Ascoli	3–0	Feralpisalò	Ascoli Piceno
CEST (UTC+2)				Stadium: Stadio Cino e Lillo Del Duca

2 September 2023 4	Südtirol	3–1	Ascoli	Bolzano
18:30 CET (UTC+1)				Stadium: Stadio Druso

16 September 2023 5	Ascoli	0–1	Palermo	Ascoli Piceno
14:00 CEST (UTC+2)				Stadium: Stadio Cino e Lillo Del Duca

23 September 2023 6	Cremonese	2–2	Ascoli	Cremona
14:00 CEST (UTC+2)				Stadium: Stadio Giovanni Zini

26 September 2023 7	Ascoli	2–0	Ternana	Ascoli Piceno
CEST (UTC+2)				Stadium: Stadio Cino e Lillo Del Duca

30 September 2023 8	Brescia	1–1	Ascoli	Brescia
14:00 CEST (UTC+2)				Stadium: Stadio Mario Rigamonti

7 October 2023 9	Ascoli	1–1	Sampdoria	Ascoli Piceno
CEST (UTC+2)				Stadium: Stadio Cino e Lillo Del Duca

21 October 2023 10	Lecco	0–2	Ascoli	Lecco
14:00 CEST (UTC+2)				Stadium: Stadio Rigamonti-Ceppi

28 October 2023 11	Ascoli	1–3	Parma	Ascoli Piceno
CEST (UTC+2)				Stadium: Stadio Cino e Lillo Del Duca

4 November 2023 12	Bari	1–0	Ascoli	Bari
14:00 CET (UTC+1)				Stadium: Stadio San Nicola

11 November 2023 13	Ascoli	0–1	Como	Ascoli Piceno
14:00 CET (UTC+1)				Stadium: Stadio Cino e Lillo Del Duca

9 December 2023 16	Ascoli	1–2	Spezia	Ascoli Piceno
14:00 CET (UTC+1)				Stadium: Stadio Cino e Lillo Del Duca

16 December 2023 17	Ascoli	1–0	Catanzaro	Ascoli Piceno
16:15 CET (UTC+1)				Stadium: Stadio Cino e Lillo Del Duca

26 December 2023 19	Ascoli	0–0	Cittadella	Ascoli Piceno
15:00 CET (UTC+1)				Stadium: Stadio Cino e Lillo Del Duca

16 February 2024 25	Ascoli	0–0	Cremonese	Ascoli Piceno
20:40 CET (UTC+1)				Stadium: Stadio Cino e Lillo Del Duca

24 February 2024 26	Feralpisalò	0–1	Ascoli	Piacenza
14:00 CET (UTC+1)			Masini 32'	Stadium: Stadio Leonardo Garilli; Referee: Matteo Marcenaro

27 April 2024 35	Ternana	0–1	Ascoli	Terni
14:00 CEST (UTC+2)			Botteghin 90'	Stadium: Stadio Libero Liberati; Referee: Davide Ghersini

10 May 2024 38	Ascoli	v	Pisa	Ascoli Piceno
20:30 CEST (UTC+2)				Stadium: Stadio Cino e Lillo Del Duca

=== Coppa Italia ===
12 August 2023 Round of 64	Hellas Verona	3–1	Ascoli	Verona
21:00 CEST (UTC+2)	Mboula 2'; Dawidowicz 45+3'; Đurić 47' (pen.)	Report	Masini (yellow card) 12'; Forte 39' (pen.); Šimić (yellow card) 46'	Stadium: Stadio Marcantonio Bentegodi; Attendance: 8,746; Referee: Marco Piccinini
