= Pettini =

Pettini is a surname. Notable people with the surname include:

- Joe Pettini (born 1955), American baseball player and coach
- Mark Pettini (born 1983), English cricketer
- Max Pettini (born 1949), British astronomer

== See also ==
- Puttini
