= Noam Baumann =

Dominican Republic footballer (born 1996)

Personal information
- Full name: Noam Baumann Piccini
- Date of birth: 10 April 1996 (age 30)
- Place of birth: Lausanne, Switzerland
- Height: 1.94 m (6 ft 4 in)
- Position: Goalkeeper

Team information
- Current team: Albirex Niigata
- Number: 46

Youth career
- 2005–2008: FC Hünenberg
- 2008–2009: Cham
- 2009–2014: Luzern

Senior career*
Years	Team	Apps	(Gls)
2014–2015	Luzern	0	(0)
2014	→ Zug (loan)	2	(0)
2015–2016	Zug	12	(0)
2016–2018	Wil	19	(0)
2018	→ Lugano (loan)	0	(0)
2018–2022	Lugano	92	(0)
2022–2023	Ascoli	2	(0)
2023	Wil	6	(0)
2023–2024	OFI	21	(0)
2025	SC Sagamihara	32	(0)
2026–	Albirex Niigata	24	(0)

International career^{‡}
2011–2012	Switzerland U16	5	(0)
2012–2013	Switzerland U17	3	(0)
2013	Switzerland U18	1	(0)
2015	Switzerland U20	1	(0)
2017	Switzerland U21	1	(0)
2024–	Dominican Republic	2	(0)
- * Club domestic league appearances and goals as of 6 September 2026, 14:21 (UTC) ‡ National team caps and goals as of 27 March 2024

Noam Baumann Piccini (born 10 April 1996) is a professional footballer who plays as a goalkeeper for J2 League club Albirex Niigata. Born in Switzerland, he plays for the Dominican Republic national team.

== Club career ==
Baumann begun his senior footballing career with Zug 94, and overcame knee injuries in his first season to become the starting goalie. He transferred to FC Wil on 11 February 2016. Baumann then joined FC Lugano in the Swiss Super League on a loan with option to buy, on 15 March 2018.

Baumann made his professional debut for Lugano in a 2-1 Swiss Super League win over FC Sion on 22 July 2018.

On 30 July 2022, Baumann joined Saudi Arabian club Abha on a two-year deal. On 6 August 2022, it was announced that the club and the player both agreed to cancel the contract mutually due to Baumann's partner's circumstances.

On 8 September 2022, Baumann signed with Ascoli in Italy until the end of the season, with an option to extend for two more years. On 31 January 2023, Baumann's contract with Ascoli was terminated by mutual consent.

On 14 February 2023, Baumann returned to Wil until the end of the season, with an option to extend.

On 9 September 2023, OFI officially announced the signing of Baumann on a two-year contract.

On 21 January 2025, Baumann was abroad to Japan for the first time and signed to J3 club, SC Sagamihara for 2025 season.

== International career ==
Baumann was born in Switzerland, to a Swiss father from Bern and a Dominican mother. He was a youth international for Switzerland. In March 2024, he was called up by the Dominican Republic national team.

He made his debut on 23 March 2024 in a friendly against Aruba.

== Career statistics ==
=== Club ===
As of the start for 2025 season.

Club	Season	League			Cup		League Cup		Continental		Other		Total	
Club	Season	Division	Apps	Goals	Apps	Goals	Apps	Goals	Apps	Goals	Apps	Goals	Apps	Goals
Wil	2016–17	Swiss Challenge League	4	0	0	0	—						4	0
Wil	2017–18	Swiss Challenge League	15	0	2	0	—						17	0
Wil	Total		19	0	2	0	—						21	0
Lugano (loan)	2017–18	Swiss Super League	0	0	0	0	—						0	0
Lugano	2018–19	Swiss Super League	24	0	2	0	—						26	0
Lugano	2019–20	Swiss Super League	35	0	0	0	—		5	0	—		40	0
Lugano	2020–21	Swiss Super League	27	0	0	0	—		—				27	0
Lugano	2021–22	Swiss Super League	6	0	0	0	—		—				6	0
Lugano	Total		92	0	2	0	—		5	0	—		99	0
Ascoli	2022–23	Serie B	2	0	0	0	—						2	0
Wil	2022–23	Swiss Challenge League	6	0	0	0	—						6	0
OFI	2023–24	Super League Greece	20	0	4	0	—						24	0
OFI	2024–25	Super League Greece	0	0	0	0	—						0	0
SC Sagamihara	2025	J3 League	32	0	0	0	5	0	—				37	0
Albirex Niigata	2026	J2 League	15	0									15	0
Albirex Niigata	2026-27	J2 League	9	0			1	0					10	0
Albirex Niigata	Total	total	24	0	0	1	0	0	0	0	0	0	25	0
Career total			195	0	8	0	6	0	5	0	0	0	214	0

== Honours ==
Lugano

- Swiss Cup: 2021–22
