= Puttini =

Puttini is a surname. Notable people with the surname include:

- Daniele Sarzi Puttini (born 1996), Italian footballer
- Felice Puttini (born 1967), Swiss cyclist
