= Bruno Amione =

Argentine footballer (born 2002)

Personal information
- Full name: Bruno Agustin Amione
- Date of birth: 3 January 2002 (age 24)
- Place of birth: Calchaquí, Argentina
- Height: 1.89 m (6 ft 2 in)
- Position: Centre-back

Team information
- Current team: Santos Laguna
- Number: 2

Youth career
- –2019: Belgrano

Senior career*
Years	Team	Apps	(Gls)
2019–2020	Belgrano	8	(0)
2020–2024	Hellas Verona	11	(0)
2021–2022	→ Reggina (loan)	16	(0)
2022–2023	→ Sampdoria (loan)	26	(1)
2024–	Santos Laguna	52	(4)

International career
2018	Argentina U16	4	(0)
2019	Argentina U17	8	(2)
Medal record
Men's football
Representing Argentina
South American U-17 Championship
Gold medal – first place	2019 Peru	U-17 Team
- * Club domestic league appearances and goals as of 28 January 2024

Bruno Agustin Amione (born 3 January 2002) is an Argentine professional footballer who plays as a centre-back for Liga MX club Santos Laguna. He was included in The Guardian's "Next Generation 2019" and competed at the 2024 Summer Olympics.

== Club career ==
On 2 October 2020, he signed for Serie A club Hellas Verona. Amione made his debut on 25 November, as a 79th-minute substitute in a 3–3 Coppa Italia draw to Venezia, which Hellas Verona won on penalties.

On 30 August 2021, he joined Reggina on loan. Upon his return from loan to Verona, Amione made his Serie A debut in their season opener against Napoli on 15 August 2022.

On 1 September 2022, Amione moved on a season-long loan to Sampdoria.

On 1 February 2024, Amione signed with Santos Laguna in Mexico.

== Style of play ==
Mainly a centre-back, Amione can also play as a left-back.

== Personal life ==
Amione was born in Argentina and is of Italian descent, holding dual citizenship.

== Career statistics ==
=== Club ===
As of match played 10 November 2023

Appearances and goals by club, season and competition
Club	Season	League			National cup (Note: Includes Copa Argentina, Coppa Italia)		Total	
Club	Season	Division	Apps	Goals	Apps	Goals	Apps	Goals
Belgrano	2019–20	Primera B Nacional	8	0	0	0	8	0
Hellas Verona	2020–21	Serie A	0	0	2	0	2	0
Hellas Verona	2022–23	Serie A	1	0	1	0	2	0
Hellas Verona	2023–24	Serie A	5	0	2	0	7	0
Hellas Verona	Total		6	0	4	0	10	0
Reggina (loan)	2021–22	Serie B	16	0	0	0	16	0
Sampdoria (loan)	2022–23	Serie A	26	1	2	0	28	1
Career total			56	1	7	0	63	1

== Honours ==
Argentina U17

- South American U-17 Championship: 2019
