= Dario Šarić (footballer) =

Bosnian footballer (born 1997)

Personal information
- Date of birth: 30 May 1997 (age 29)
- Place of birth: Cento, Italy
- Height: 1.80 m (5 ft 11 in)
- Position: Midfielder

Team information
- Current team: Antalyaspor
- Number: 88

Youth career
- Cesena
- 2014–2015: Carpi

Senior career*
Years	Team	Apps	(Gls)
2015–2020	Carpi	54	(4)
2015	→ Virtus Castelfranco (loan)	7	(0)
2016–2017	→ Siena (loan)	19	(1)
2020–2022	Ascoli	66	(4)
2022–2025	Palermo	37	(0)
2023–2024	→ Antalyaspor (loan)	32	(3)
2025	→ Cesena (loan)	15	(3)
2025–	Antalyaspor	24	(1)

International career^{‡}
2013–2014	Bosnia and Herzegovina U17	6	(0)
2015	Bosnia and Herzegovina U19	1	(0)
2022–	Bosnia and Herzegovina	10	(0)
- * Club domestic league appearances and goals as of 9 May 2026 ‡ National team caps and goals as of 10 June 2025

Dario Šarić (pronounced [dâːrio ʃǎritɕ]; born 30 May 1997) is a professional footballer who plays as a midfielder for 1. Lig club Antalyaspor. Born in Italy, he plays for the Bosnia and Herzegovina national team.

Šarić started his professional career at Carpi, who sent him on loan to Virtus Castelfranco in 2015 and to Siena in 2016. In 2020, he joined Ascoli. Two years later, he switched to Palermo, who loaned him to Antalyaspor in 2023 and to Cesena in 2025. Later that year, he moved to Antalyaspor permanently.

A former youth international for Bosnia and Herzegovina, Šarić made his senior international debut in 2022, earning 10 caps since.

== Club career ==
=== Early career ===
Šarić started playing football at Cesena's youth academy, before joining Carpi's youth setup in 2014. In February 2015, he was loaned to Virtus Castelfranco until the end of the season. In July 2016, he was sent on a season-long loan to Siena, with whom he made his professional debut and scored his first professional goal.

In September 2020, he moved to Ascoli.

=== Palermo ===
In August 2022, Šarić signed a four-year deal with Palermo. He made his official debut for the team on 3 September against Reggina.

In August 2023, he was loaned to Turkish side Antalyaspor for the remainder of the campaign.

In January 2025, he was sent on a six-month loan to Cesena.

=== Later stage of career ===
In August, Šarić was transferred to Antalyaspor.

== International career ==
Šarić represented Bosnia and Herzegovina at various youth levels.

In May 2021, he received his first senior call up, for friendly games against Montenegro and Denmark, but had to wait until 26 September 2022 to make his debut in a 2022–23 UEFA Nations League B match against Romania.

== Personal life ==
Šarić married his long-time girlfriend Veronica in July 2026.

== Career statistics ==
=== Club ===
As of match played 28 October 2026

Appearances and goals by club, season and competition
Club	Season	League			National cup (Note: Includes Coppa Italia, Turkish Cup)		Other		Total	
Club	Season	Division	Apps	Goals	Apps	Goals	Apps	Goals	Apps	Goals
Virtus Castelfranco (loan)	2014–15	Serie D	7	0	–		–		7	0
Siena (loan)	2016–17	Serie C	19	1	0	0	–		19	1
Carpi	2017–18	Serie B	24	0	3	0	–		27	0
Carpi	2018–19	Serie B	5	0	0	0	–		5	0
Carpi	2019–20	Serie C	25	4	2	0	2 (Note: Appearances in Serie C promotion play-offs)	0	29	4
Carpi	Total		54	4	5	0	2	0	61	4
Ascoli	2020–21	Serie B	34	1	1	0	–		35	1
Ascoli	2021–22	Serie B	31	3	1	0	1 (Note: Appearance in Serie B promotion play-offs)	0	33	3
Ascoli	2022–23	Serie B	1	0	1	1	–		2	1
Ascoli	Total		66	4	3	1	1	0	70	5
Palermo	2022–23	Serie B	28	0	–		–		28	0
Palermo	2023–24	Serie B	1	0	1	0	–		2	0
Palermo	2024–25	Serie B	8	0	2	0	–		10	0
Palermo	Total		37	0	3	0	–		40	0
Antalyaspor (loan)	2023–24	Süper Lig	32	3	2	0	–		34	3
Cesena (loan)	2024–25	Serie B	15	3	–		1	0	16	3
Antalyaspor	2025–26	Süper Lig	24	1	4	0	–		28	1
Antalyaspor	2026–27	1. Lig	0	0	1	1	–		1	1
Antalyaspor	Total		24	1	5	1	–		29	2
Career total			254	16	18	2	4	0	276	18

=== International ===
As of match played 10 June 2025

Appearances and goals by national team and year
National team	Year	Apps	Goals
Bosnia and Herzegovina
Bosnia and Herzegovina	2022	1	0
Bosnia and Herzegovina	2023	0	0
Bosnia and Herzegovina	2024	6	0
Bosnia and Herzegovina	2025	3	0
Total		10	0
