= Matteo Arena =

Italian footballer (born 1999)

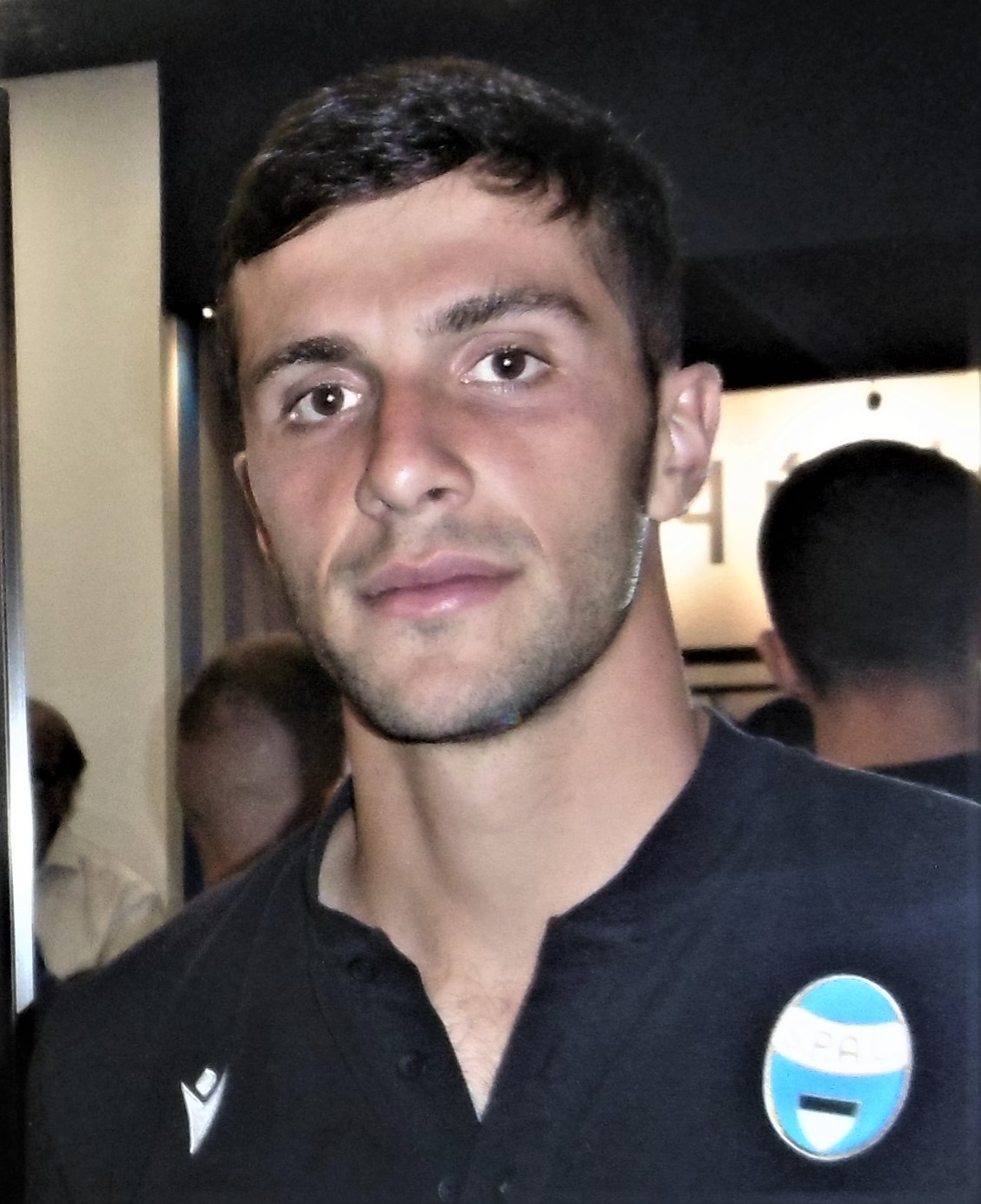
- Arena with SPAL

Personal information
- Date of birth: 14 January 1999 (age 27)
- Place of birth: Valenzano, Italy
- Height: 1.89 m (6 ft 2 in)
- Position: Centre-back

Team information
- Current team: Lecco
- Number: 5

Youth career
- –2017: Bari
- 2018–2019: Foggia

Senior career*
Years	Team	Apps	(Gls)
2017–2018	Vigor Trani	21	(3)
2018–2019	Foggia	0	(0)
2019–2022	Monopoli	46	(6)
2022–2025	SPAL	49	(4)
2025–2026	Arezzo	4	(0)
2026	Salernitana	12	(0)
2026–	Lecco	1	(0)
- * Club domestic league appearances and goals as of 22 August 2026

Matteo Arena (born 14 January 1999) is an Italian footballer who plays as a centre-back for Serie C Group A club Lecco.

== Club career ==
Arena began his senior career in the fifth-tier Eccellenza. He also won Coppa Italia Eccellenza Puglia 2017-18 with Vigor Trani Calcio For the 2018–19 season, he joined Foggia, where he played for the Under-19 squad, remaining on the bench in senior squad's games in Serie B. He then played for three Serie C seasons with Monopoli.

On 16 July 2022, Arena signed a three-year contract with SPAL in Serie B. He made his Serie B debut for SPAL on 14 August 2022 in a game against Reggina.
