= Manuele Castorani =

Italian footballer

Personal information
- Date of birth: 7 October 1999 (age 27)
- Place of birth: Cecina, Italy
- Height: 1.83 m (6 ft 0 in)
- Position: Midfielder

Team information
- Current team: Potenza
- Number: 8

Youth career
- Empoli

Senior career*
Years	Team	Apps	(Gls)
2017–2019	Empoli	0	(0)
2017–2019	→ Ponsacco (loan)	67	(5)
2019–2020	SC Ligorna	11	(1)
2020–2021	Virtus Francavilla	41	(6)
2021–2023	Ascoli	4	(0)
2022	→ Feralpisalò (loan)	10	(0)
2022–2023	→ Siena (loan)	32	(0)
2024–	Potenza	66	(7)
- * Club domestic league appearances and goals as of 1 May 2026

Manuele Castorani (born 7 October 1999) is an Italian professional footballer who plays as a midfielder for Serie C Group C club Potenza.

== Career ==
=== Club career ===
Castorani is a product of Empoli. At the age of 17, Castorani was sent out on loan to Serie D club Ponsacco. He made 28 appearances and scored three goals in his first season. In July 2018, the loan deal was extended for one season more. In his second season at the club, he made 40 appearances. In the summer 2019, he moved to fellow league club SC Ligorna 1922.

After two and a half seasons in Serie D, Castorani joined Serie C club Virtus Francavilla on 2 January 2020.

On 7 July 2021, he signed a three-year contract with Serie B club Ascoli.

On 19 January 2022, he joined Feralpisalò on loan. On 1 September 2022, Castorani was loaned to Siena.

On 31 August 2023 he left Ascoli.

On 18 January 2024, Castorani signed a six-months contract with Potenza.
