= Danilo Giacinto Ventola =

Italian footballer (born 2000)

Danilo Ventola
Personal information
- Full name: Danilo Giacinto Ventola
- Date of birth: 11 September 2000 (age 26)
- Place of birth: Brindisi, Italy
- Height: 1.85 m (6 ft 1 in)
- Position: Forward

Team information
- Current team: Cedas Brindisi 1991

Youth career
- –2016: Bari
- 2016–2018: Ascoli
- 2018–2019: → Genoa (loan)

Senior career*
Years	Team	Apps	(Gls)
2018–2019	Ascoli	0	(0)
2019	→ Genoa (loan)	0	(0)
2019–2020	Genoa	0	(0)
2019–2020	→ Rimini (loan)	20	(2)
2020–2023	Ascoli	0	(0)
2020–2021	→ Imolese (loan)	15	(0)
2021	→ Turris (loan)	8	(0)
2021–2022	→ Virtus Francavilla (loan)	34	(3)
2022–2023	→ Recanatese (loan)	15	(2)
2023	→ Fidelis Andria (loan)	14	(2)
2023	United Riccione	8	(0)
2023–2024	Bitonto	10	(1)
2024	SSD Massafra 1963		
2024–2025	Gallipoli		
2025–	Cedas Brindisi 1991		
- * Club domestic league appearances and goals as of 11 November 2026

Danilo Giacinto Ventola (born 11 September 2000) is an Italian footballer who plays as a forward for Cedas Brindisi 1991.

== Club career ==
=== Ascoli ===
Ventola started playing for the Under-19 squad of Ascoli in the 2016–17 season. In March 2018 he received five call-ups to the senior squad of Ascoli, but did not see any field time.

==== Loan to Genoa ====
On 17 August 2018, he signed a three-year professional contract with Ascoli and joined Serie A club Genoa on loan with a purchase option. He played for Genoa's Under-19 squad in the 2018–19 season, without any call-ups to the senior squad.

=== Genoa ===
==== Loan to Rimini ====
On 3 August 2019, Ventola joined Serie C club Rimini on a season-long loan.

He made his professional Serie C debut for Rimini on 21 September 2019 in a game against Carpi. He started the game and was substituted at half-time.

=== Return to Ascoli ===
==== Loan to Imolese ====
On 29 August 2020, he was loaned by Serie C club Imolese.

==== Loan to Turris ====
On 28 January 2021, he moved on loan to Serie C club Turris until the end of the 2020–21 season.

==== Loan to Virtus Francavilla ====
On 20 August 2021, he joined Virtus Francavilla on loan.

==== Loans to Recanatese and Fidelis Andria ====
On 19 July 2022, Ventola was loaned to Recanatese. On 6 January 2023, he moved on a new loan to Fidelis Andria.

==== Release by Ascoli ====
On 25 August 2023, his contract with Ascoli was terminated by mutual consent.

== Personal life ==
He is a nephew of former player Nicola Ventola.
