= Daniele Sarzi Puttini =

Italian footballer (born 1996)

Personal information
- Date of birth: 8 June 1996 (age 30)
- Place of birth: Correggio, Italy
- Height: 1.85 m (6 ft 1 in)
- Position: Defender

Youth career
- –2015: Carpi

Senior career*
Years	Team	Apps	(Gls)
2014–2020	Carpi	20	(0)
2015–2017	→ Südtirol (loan)	31	(0)
2017	→ Piacenza (loan)	4	(0)
2018	→ Cuneo (loan)	13	(0)
2018–2019	→ Fermana (loan)	34	(0)
2020–2022	Ascoli	5	(0)
2021	→ Bari (loan)	11	(0)
2021–2022	→ ACR Messina (loan)	14	(1)
2022	→ Latina (loan)	13	(0)
2022–2023	Triestina	17	(0)
2023–2024	Pro Vercelli	25	(1)
- * Club domestic league appearances and goals as of 3 May 2024

Daniele Sarzi Puttini (born 8 June 1996) is an Italian footballer who plays as a defender.

== Career ==
He made his Serie B debut for Carpi on 30 May 2014 in a game against Juve Stabia.

On 22 September 2020, he signed a multi-year contract with Ascoli.

On 21 January 2021, he was loaned to Bari.

On 7 August 2021, he joined Messina on loan. On 23 January 2022, he moved on a new loan to Latina.

On 15 July 2022, Sarzi Puttini signed a two-year contract with Triestina.

On 30 August 2023, Sarzi Puttini transferred to Pro Vercelli.

== Honours ==
Carpi

- Serie B: 2014–15
