= Nikita Contini =

Ukrainian footballer (born 1996)

Nikita Contini Нікі́та Конті́ні
Personal information
- Full name: Nikita Contini-Baranovsky
- Date of birth: 21 May 1996 (age 30)
- Place of birth: Cherkasy, Ukraine
- Height: 1.90 m (6 ft 3 in)
- Position: Goalkeeper

Team information
- Current team: Napoli
- Number: 14

Youth career
- Atletico Giugliano
- 2008–2015: Napoli

Senior career*
Years	Team	Apps	(Gls)
2014–	Napoli	2	(0)
2015–2016	→ SPAL (loan)	8	(0)
2016–2017	→ Carrarese (loan)	2	(0)
2017	→ Taranto (loan)	5	(0)
2017–2018	→ Pontedera (loan)	36	(0)
2018–2019	→ Siena (loan)	37	(0)
2019–2020	→ Virtus Entella (loan)	32	(0)
2021–2022	→ Crotone (loan)	7	(0)
2022	→ Vicenza (loan)	14	(0)
2022–2023	→ Sampdoria (loan)	0	(0)
2023	→ Reggina (loan)	8	(0)
- * Club domestic league appearances and goals as of 24 May 2026

Nikita Contini-Baranovsky (Ukrainian: Нікі́та Конті́ні-Барано́вський; born 21 May 1996) is a Ukrainian professional footballer who plays as a goalkeeper for Serie A club Napoli.

== Career ==
=== Youth career ===
Contini was born in Cherkasy, Ukraine, to a Ukrainian-Italian father originally from Naples and a Ukrainian mother. When Contini was three years old, he moved with his family to Giugliano in Campania, Italy.

He started his football career at the age of five at Atletico Giugliano, where his stepfather was a youth coach; he often ended up playing in teams with older boys as he moved up their youth ranks.

In 2007, Napoli played Atletico Giugliano in a friendly and Contini stood out with his performance and impressed Napoli's then youth goalkeeping coach Luciano Tarallo. Later that year, he went on trial with Napoli and in 2008 he joined their youth system; in his first season at Napoli, he provided good performances and won the best goalkeeper award in the "Niccolò Galli" youth tournament in Florence and the "Cairo Montenotte" tournament in Savona, Italy. However, a serious knee injury (meniscus tear) following a clash with teammate Gennaro Tutino forced him to miss the remainder of the season.

After recovering from his injury, he made a full comeback with the youth team and took part in the renowned "Beppe Viola-Arco di Trento" youth tournament, where Contini played all the games and Napoli reached the final, then lost to Inter Milan; Contini went on to win the award for best goalkeeper of the tournament.

On 3 April 2013, Contini made his debut for the Primavera Under-19 team in a match against Lanciano, as a substitute, and immediately saved a penalty on his first game. In the 2013–14 season, Contini also featured in the UEFA Youth League.

=== Napoli ===
His performances with the youth ranks did not go unnoticed, as Contini was called up by Xavi Valero, then goalkeeping coach of Napoli, to join the first team, being called up on many occasions during the 2014–15 season under Rafa Benitez.

==== Loan to SPAL ====
In July 2015, Contini moved to SPAL on loan until the end of the 2015–16 season, in order to gain first team experience in the Italian third division.

==== Loan to Virtus Entella ====
On 23 July 2019, he joined newly promoted Serie B club Virtus Entella on loan. He started Entella's season opener on 23 August 2019 against Livorno, making his debut in the second tier of Italian football.

==== Loans to Crotone and Vicenza ====
On 19 August 2021, he joined newly promoted Serie B club Crotone on loan. On 31 January 2022, he moved on loan to Vicenza.

==== Loan to Sampdoria ====
On 11 August 2022, Contini moved to Sampdoria on a season-long loan.

==== Loan to Reggina ====
On 13 January 2023, Contini joined Reggina on loan.

== Career statistics ==
As of match played 24 May 2026

Appearances and goals by club, season and competition
Club	Season	League			National cup		Europe		Other		Total	
Club	Season	Division	Apps	Goals	Apps	Goals	Apps	Goals	Apps	Goals	Apps	Goals
Napoli	2013–14	Serie A	0	0	0	0	0	0	—		0	0
Napoli	2014–15	Serie A	0	0	0	0	0	0	—		0	0
Napoli	2020–21	Serie A	0	0	0	0	0	0	0	0	0	0
Napoli	2023–24	Serie A	1	0	0	0	0	0	0	0	1	0
Napoli	2024–25	Serie A	0	0	0	0	—		—		0	0
Napoli	2025–26	Serie A	1	0	0	0	0	0	0	0	1	0
Napoli	Total		2	0	0	0	0	0	0	0	2	0
SPAL (loan)	2015–16	Lega Pro	8	0	1	0	—		4	0	13	0
Carrarese (loan)	2016–17	Lega Pro	2	0	—		—		2	0	4	0
Taranto (loan)	2016–17	Lega Pro	5	0	—		—		1	0	6	0
Pontedera (loan)	2017–18	Lega Pro	35	0	—		—		3	0	38	0
Siena (loan)	2018–19	Serie C	36	0	—		—		1	0	37	0
Virtus Entella (loan)	2019–20	Serie B	32	0	1	0	—		—		33	0
Crotone (loan)	2021–22	Serie B	7	0	0	0	—		—		7	0
Vicenza (loan)	2021–22	Serie B	12	0	—		—		2	0	14	0
Sampdoria (loan)	2022–23	Serie A	0	0	2	0	—		—		2	0
Reggina (loan)	2022–23	Serie B	8	0	—		—		1	0	9	0
Career total			147	0	4	0	0	0	14	0	165	0

== Honours ==
Napoli

- Supercoppa Italiana: 2025–26
