= Tommaso Augello =

Italian footballer (born 1994)

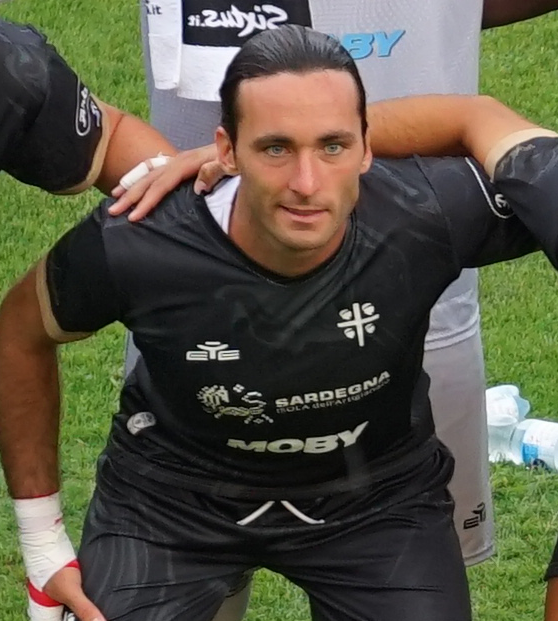
- Tommaso Augello in 2024

Personal information
- Date of birth: 30 August 1994 (age 32)
- Place of birth: Milan, Italy
- Height: 1.80 m (5 ft 11 in)
- Positions: Left-back; defensive midfielder

Team information
- Current team: Palermo
- Number: 3

Youth career
- –2011: Cimiano

Senior career*
| Years | Team | Apps | (Gls) |
| 2011–2014 | Pontisola | 92 | (3) |
| 2014–2017 | Giana Erminio | 109 | (1) |
| 2017–2020 | Spezia | 45 | (1) |
| 2019–2020 | → Sampdoria (loan) | 17 | (0) |
| 2020–2023 | Sampdoria | 110 | (4) |
| 2023–2025 | Cagliari | 70 | (1) |
| 2025– | Palermo | 38 | (1) |
- * Club domestic league appearances and goals as of 12 May 2026

Tommaso Augello (born 30 August 1994) is an Italian professional footballer who plays as a left-back or defensive midfielder for Serie B club Palermo.

== Club career ==
Augello made his Serie C debut for Giana Erminio on 5 September 2014 in a game against Lumezzane.

On 9 July 2019, he joined Serie A club Sampdoria on loan with an obligation to buy.

On 18 July 2023, Augello signed a two-year contract with Cagliari.

On 8 July 2025, Augello moved to Palermo.

== Personal life ==
On 1 January 2022, he tested positive for COVID-19.

== Career statistics ==
=== Club ===
As of match played 25 May 2025

Appearances and goals by club, season and competition
| Club | Season | League | | | National Cup (Note: Includes Coppa Italia, Coppa Italia Serie C) | | Europe | | Other | | Total | |
| Club | Season | Division | Apps | Goals | Apps | Goals | Apps | Goals | Apps | Goals | Apps | Goals |
|---|---|---|---|---|---|---|---|---|---|---|---|---|
| Pontisola | 2012–13 | Serie D | 0 | 0 | 2 | 0 | — | | — | | 2 | 0 |
| Pontisola | 2013–14 | Serie D | 34 | 0 | 2 | 0 | — | | — | | 36 | 0 |
| Pontisola | Total | | 34 | 0 | 4 | 0 | — | | — | | 38 | 0 |
| Giana Erminio | 2014–15 | Lega Pro | 35 | 0 | 2 | 0 | — | | — | | 37 | 0 |
| Giana Erminio | 2015–16 | Lega Pro | 33 | 1 | 3 | 0 | — | | — | | 36 | 1 |
| Giana Erminio | 2016–17 | Lega Pro | 38 | 0 | 5 | 0 | — | | 3 (Note: Appearance(s) in Serie C/Lega Pro play-off) | 0 | 46 | 0 |
| Giana Erminio | Total | | 106 | 1 | 10 | 0 | — | | 3 | 0 | 119 | 1 |
| Spezia | 2017–18 | Serie B | 14 | 0 | 1 | 0 | — | | — | | 15 | 0 |
| Spezia | 2018–19 | Serie B | 31 | 1 | 2 | 0 | — | | 1 (Note: Appearance(s) in Serie B Pro play-off) | 0 | 34 | 1 |
| Spezia | Total | | 45 | 1 | 3 | 0 | — | | 1 | 0 | 49 | 1 |
| Sampdoria (loan) | 2019–20 | Serie A | 17 | 0 | 1 | 0 | — | | — | | 18 | 0 |
| Sampdoria | 2020–21 | Serie A | 37 | 1 | 1 | 0 | — | | — | | 38 | 1 |
| Sampdoria | 2021–22 | Serie A | 36 | 1 | 2 | 0 | — | | — | | 38 | 1 |
| Sampdoria | 2022–23 | Serie A | 37 | 2 | 3 | 0 | — | | — | | 40 | 2 |
| Sampdoria | Total | | 127 | 4 | 7 | 0 | — | | — | | 134 | 4 |
| Cagliari | 2023–24 | Serie A | 32 | 1 | 1 | 0 | — | | — | | 33 | 1 |
| Cagliari | 2024–25 | Serie A | 38 | 0 | 3 | 0 | — | | — | | 41 | 0 |
| Cagliari | Total | | 70 | 1 | 4 | 0 | — | | — | | 74 | 1 |
| Career total | | | 372 | 7 | 28 | 0 | — | | 4 | 0 | 414 | 7 |
