= Eric Botteghin =

Brazilian footballer (born 1987)

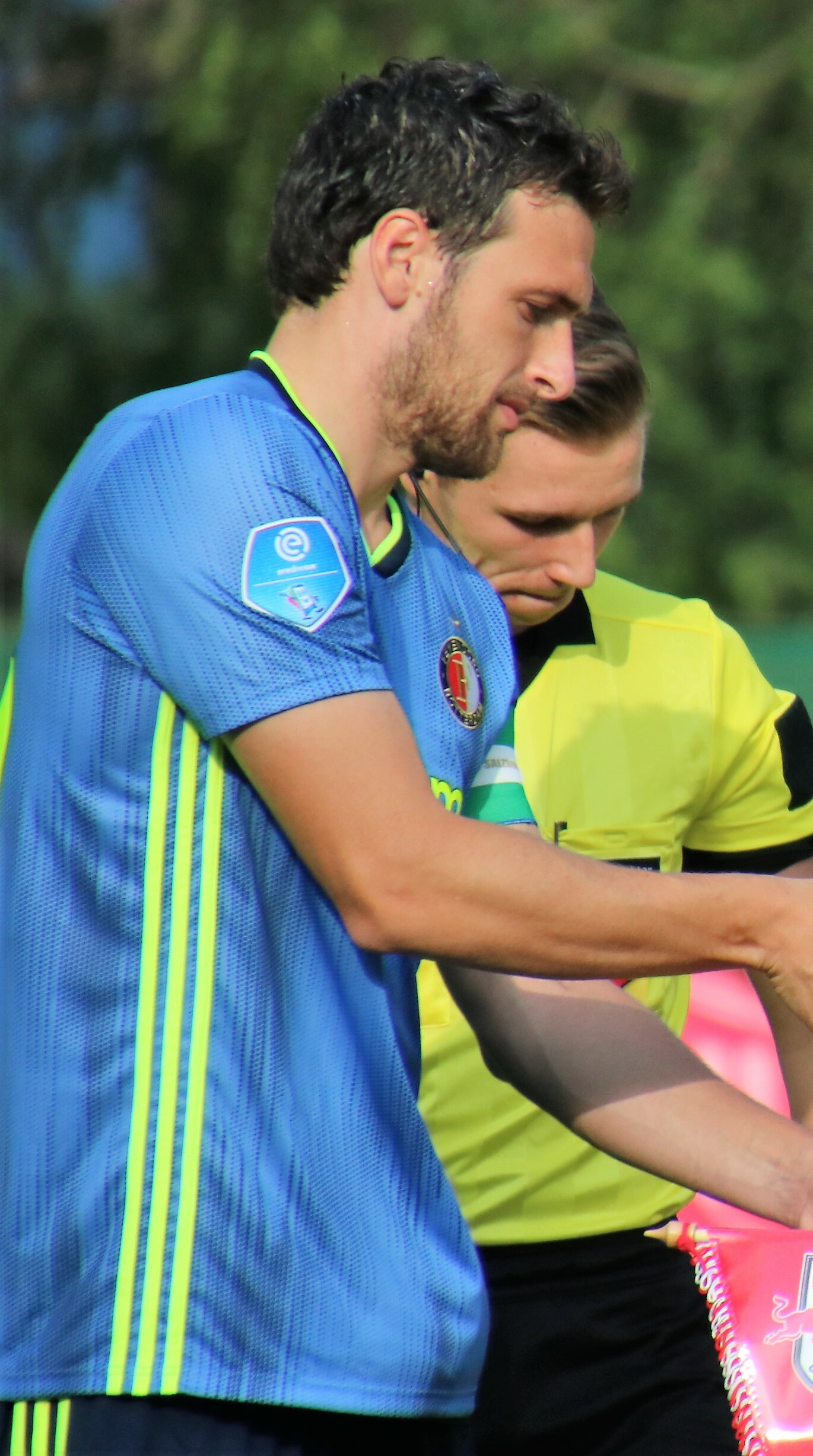
- Botteghin with Feyenoord in 2019.

Personal information
- Full name: Eric Fernando Botteghin
- Date of birth: 31 August 1987 (age 39)
- Place of birth: São Paulo, Brazil
- Height: 1.93 m (6 ft 4 in)
- Position: Centre-back

Team information
- Current team: Portuguesa
- Number: 33

Youth career
- 2001: Palmeiras
- 2002–2006: Grêmio Barueri
- 2005–2006: → Internacional (loan)

Senior career*
Years	Team	Apps	(Gls)
2007–2011	PEC Zwolle	140	(12)
2011–2013	NAC Breda	64	(5)
2013–2015	Groningen	73	(5)
2015–2021	Feyenoord	135	(9)
2021–2024	Ascoli	94	(9)
2024–2025	Modena	5	(0)
2026–	Portuguesa	17	(1)
- * Club domestic league appearances and goals as of 14:44, 3 August 2026 (UTC)

Eric Fernando Botteghin (born 31 August 1987) is a Brazilian professional footballer who plays as a centre-back for Portuguesa.

== Career ==
=== Early career ===
Botteghin played in the youth academies of Palmeiras and Grêmio Barueri, but was also loaned out to Internacional for one season. In January 2007, after impressing in a youth tournament in Groningen, he moved to Dutch side FC Zwolle.

Botteghin made his professional debut on 26 January 2007, starting in a 4–1 Eerste Divisie home routing of FC Eindhoven. He scored his first goal on 23 February, in a 2–1 home win over Stormvogels Telstar, and established himself as a regular starter afterwards.

=== NAC Breda ===
On 31 March 2011, Botteghin agreed to join Eredivisie side NAC Breda, effective as of 1 July. He made his debut in the category on 14 August, coming on as a half-time substitute for Kees Luijckx in a 2–1 away loss to Heracles Almelo.

Botteghin scored his first goal in the top tier of Dutch football on 28 October 2011, netting the opener in a 3–1 home win over VVV-Venlo. He then became an undisputed starter for the side, contributing with 32 league matches in both seasons.

=== Groningen ===
On 28 June 2013, Botteghin moved to fellow top tier side FC Groningen, after the club paid € 650,000 for his transfer. He helped the Green-White Army win the KNVB Cup in 2014–15 against defending champions PEC Zwolle; it was their first major trophy and they qualified for the UEFA Europa League.

=== Feyenoord ===
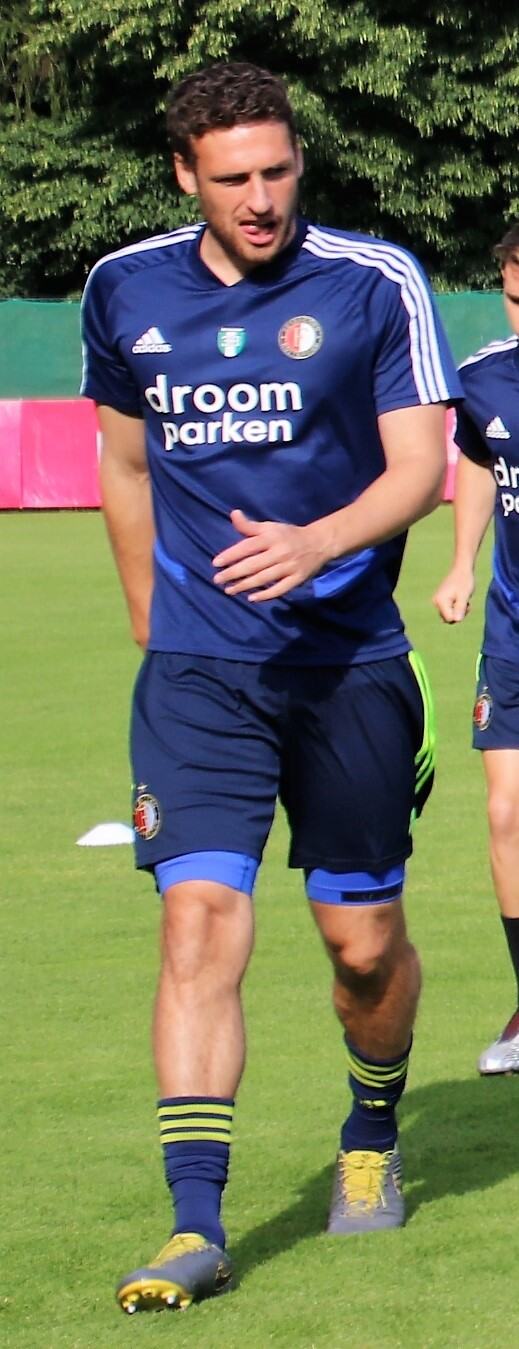
Botteghin training with Feyenoord in 2019

On 13 August 2015, Botteghin signed a four-year contract with Feyenoord, for a rumoured fee of € 2.5 million. A backup option, he became a first-choice in January 2016, but suffered a knee injury in September 2017; he still signed a new deal until 2020 in November of that year.

Back to action in January 2018, Botteghin played with the under-23s to regain match fitness, before returning to first team duties in February. On 22 April 2018, he played as Feyenoord won the 2017–18 KNVB Cup final 3–0 against AZ Alkmaar.

In 2019, Botteghin became the captain of Feyenoord, and signed a one-year contract extension with the club on 22 July 2020, keeping him at the club until 2021. He left them after the 2020–21 season, after his contract was not extended.

=== Ascoli ===
On 3 August 2021, Botteghin moved to Italy after nearly 14 years, and signed a two-year contract with Serie B side Ascoli. He immediately became a starter, and was a team captain during the 2023–24 season.

=== Modena ===
On 17 July 2024, Botteghin moved to fellow second division side Modena on a one-year deal. After only five matches, he left after his contract expired.

=== Portuguesa ===
On 21 November 2025, after nearly two decades in Europe, Botteghin returned to his home country and joined Portuguesa.

== Personal life ==
Botteghin is a Brazilian with Italian ancestry; his paternal great-grandfather was originally from Treviso and moved to Brazil during the World War II. Due to that, he is also an Italian citizen through jus sanguinis.

== Career statistics ==
As of 3 August 2026

Appearances and goals by club, season and competition
Club	Season	League			State league (Note: Includes Campeonato Paulista)		National cup (Note: Includes KNVB Cup, Coppa Italia)		Europe		Other		Total	
Club	Season	Division	Apps	Goals	Apps	Goals	Apps	Goals	Apps	Goals	Apps	Goals	Apps	Goals
PEC Zwolle	2006–07	Eerste Divisie	14	3	—		0	0	—		—		14	3
PEC Zwolle	2007–08	Eerste Divisie	27	2	—		0	0	—		—		27	2
PEC Zwolle	2008–09	Eerste Divisie	36	5	—		0	0	—		2 (Note: Appearance(s) in Eerste Divisie promotion play-offs)	0	38	5
PEC Zwolle	2009–10	Eerste Divisie	35	1	—		1	0	—		1	0	37	1
PEC Zwolle	2010–11	Eerste Divisie	27	1	—		2	0	—		4	0	33	1
PEC Zwolle	Total		139	12	—		3	0	—		7	0	149	12
NAC Breda	2011–12	Eredivisie	32	2	—		1	0	—		—		33	2
NAC Breda	2012–13	Eredivisie	32	3	—		2	1	—		—		34	4
NAC Breda	Total		64	5	—		3	1	—		—		67	6
Groningen	2013–14	Eredivisie	38	2	—		3	1	—		—		41	3
Groningen	2014–15	Eredivisie	34	3	—		5	0	2 (Note: Appearance(s) in UEFA Europa League)	0	—		41	3
Groningen	2015–16	Eredivisie	1	0	—		0	0	0	0	1 (Note: Appearance in Johan Cruyff Shield)	0	2	0
Groningen	Total		73	5	—		8	1	2	0	1	0	84	6
Feyenoord	2015–16	Eredivisie	22	0	—		3	1	0	0	0	0	25	1
Feyenoord	2016–17	Eredivisie	34	4	—		3	1	5	0	1	0	43	5
Feyenoord	2017–18	Eredivisie	12	0	—		3	0	1 (Note: Appearance in UEFA Champions League)	0	1	0	17	0
Feyenoord	2018–19	Eredivisie	22	2	—		1	0	1	1	1	0	25	3
Feyenoord	2019–20	Eredivisie	20	2	—		3	0	9	2	—		32	4
Feyenoord	2020–21	Eredivisie	25	1	—		1	0	4	0	—		30	1
Feyenoord	Total		135	9	—		14	2	20	3	3	0	172	14
Ascoli	2021–22	Serie B	32	2	—		1	0	—		—		33	2
Ascoli	2022–23	Serie B	37	3	—		2	0	—		—		39	3
Ascoli	2023–24	Serie B	25	4	—		1	0	—		—		26	4
Ascoli	Total		94	9	—		5	0	—		—		99	9
Modena	2024–25	Serie B	4	0	—		0	0	—		—		4	0
Portuguesa	2026	Série D	13	1	4	0	1	0	—		—		18	1
Career total			522	41	4	0	34	4	22	3	11	0	593	48

== Honours ==
Groningen

- KNVB Cup: 2014–15

Feyenoord

- Eredivisie: 2016–17
- KNVB Cup: 2015–16, 2017–18
- Johan Cruijff Shield: 2017, 2018
