= Francesco Donati =

Italian footballer (born 2001)

Personal information
- Date of birth: 20 January 2001 (age 25)
- Place of birth: Livorno, Italy
- Height: 1.85 m (6 ft 1 in)
- Position: Right-back

Team information
- Current team: Pescara

Youth career
- –2021: Empoli

Senior career*
Years	Team	Apps	(Gls)
2019–2024	Empoli	0	(0)
2021–2022	→ Juve Stabia (loan)	34	(0)
2022–2023	→ Ascoli (loan)	20	(1)
2023–2024	→ Lecco (loan)	1	(0)
2024	→ Arezzo (loan)	15	(0)
2024–2026	Ternana	69	(2)
2026–	Pescara	0	(0)
- * Club domestic league appearances and goals as of 26 April 2026

Francesco Donati (born 20 January 2001) is an Italian professional footballer who plays as a right-back for Serie C Group B club Pescara.

== Club career ==
Donati was raised in the Empoli youth teams and began receiving call-ups to the senior squad in the 2019–20 season, remaining on the bench on those occasions.

On 22 July 2021, Donati joined Serie C side Juve Stabia on a season-long loan.

On 12 July 2022, Donati moved on a new loan to the Serie B club Ascoli. He made his Serie B debut for Ascoli on 14 August 2022 in a game against Ternana.

On 9 August 2023, he joined Lecco on loan. On 13 January 2024, Donati moved on a new loan to Arezzo.

On 29 August 2024, Donati signed a two-year contract with Ternana.
