= Stadio Cino e Lillo Del Duca =

Multi-purpose stadium in Ascoli Piceno, Italy

Coordinates: 42°51′40″N 13°35′39″E

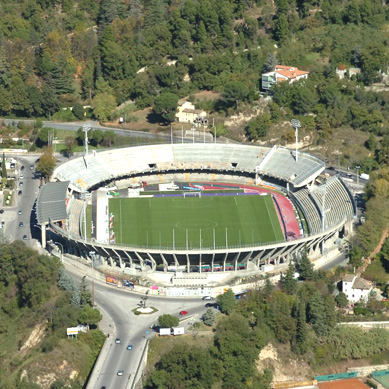
- Interactive map of Stadio Cino e Lillo Del Duca
- Location: Ascoli Piceno, Italy
- Owner: Municipality of Ascoli Piceno
- Capacity: 12,461
- Surface: Grass; 105x68m

Construction
- Groundbreaking: 1962
- Opened: 1962
- Renovated: 1975, 2015–2017

Tenants
- Ascoli; Italy national football team (selected matches)

Stadio Cino e Lillo Del Duca is a multi-purpose stadium in Ascoli Piceno, Italy. It is currently used mostly for football matches and the home of Ascoli Calcio 1898 F.C. The stadium was built in 1962 and holds 12,461.

== History ==
The stadium was named after the two brothers Cino and Lillo Del Duca, who were entrepreneurs in publishing, founders (on behalf of Enrico Mattei) of the newspaper Il Giorno and supporters of the city football club.

The stadium has twice hosted Italy's end-of-year rugby union international: victories against Samoa on 28 November 2009 and 8 November 2014.
