= Filippo Palazzino =

Italian footballer (born 2003)

Personal information
- Date of birth: 30 September 2003 (age 23)
- Place of birth: Palestrina, Italia
- Height: 1.77 m (5 ft 10 in)
- Position: Forward

Team information
- Current team: Cosenza
- Number: 28

Youth career
- –2019: Tor Tre Teste
- 2019–2021: Ascoli

Senior career*
Years	Team	Apps	(Gls)
2021–2026	Ascoli	19	(0)
2023–2024	→ Monterosi (loan)	21	(3)
2024–2025	→ Legnago (loan)	16	(0)
2025	→ Picerno (loan)	7	(0)
2026–	Cosenza	1	(0)

International career^{‡}
2022	Italy U19	1	(0)
- * Club domestic league appearances and goals as of 22 August 2026 ‡ National team caps and goals as of 9 February 2022

Filippo Palazzino (born 30 September 2003) is an Italian footballer who plays as a forward for Serie C Group C club Cosenza.

== Club career ==
Palazzino made his Serie B debut for Ascoli on 14 January 2022 in a game against Ternana.

On 14 July 2023, he joined Monterosi on loan. On 5 August 2024, Palazzino moved on loan to Legnago.
