= Nicola Murru =

Italian footballer (born 1994)

Personal information
- Date of birth: 16 December 1994 (age 31)
- Place of birth: Cagliari, Italy
- Height: 1.80 m (5 ft 11 in)
- Position: Left-back

Youth career
- 2001–2011: Cagliari

Senior career*
Years	Team	Apps	(Gls)
2011–2017	Cagliari	98	(0)
2017–2024	Sampdoria	148	(2)
2020–2021	→ Torino (loan)	14	(0)
2025–2026	Gubbio	21	(0)

International career
2011	Italy U17	4	(0)
2011–2012	Italy U18	9	(0)
2012–2013	Italy U19	12	(0)
2014–2017	Italy U21	10	(0)
- * Club domestic league appearances and goals as of 30 April 2026

Nicola Murru (born 16 December 1994) is an Italian professional footballer who plays as a left-back.

== Club career ==
Born in Cagliari, Murru started his career at hometown's Cagliari. In July 2011 he was promoted to first team squad, and played his first match as a professional on 20 December, coming on as a second-half substitute in a 0–2 home loss against Milan.

Murru appeared in only one further match during the campaign, a 0–0 draw at Fiorentina, also from the bench. In 2012, after Alessandro Agostini's departure to Torino, he acted as a backup to Danilo Avelar. In the following year Murru appeared as first-choice, overtaking Avelar in the pecking order. On 8 October 2013, he renewed his link with the Rossoblù, until 2017.

On 1 July 2017, he joined Sampdoria.

On 17 September 2020, Murru joined Torino on loan with an option to buy.

== International career ==
After appearing with the under-17, under-18 and under-19's, Murru made his debut with the under-21 side on 5 March 2014, in a qualifying match against Northern Ireland.

In June 2017, he was included in the Italy under-21 squad for the 2017 UEFA European Under-21 Championship by manager Luigi Di Biagio, but later had to withdraw from the team due to injury; he was replaced by Giuseppe Pezzella.

== Career statistics ==
As of match played 1 May 2024

Appearances and goals by club, season and competition
Club	Season	League			National Cup		Continental		Other		Total	
Club	Season	Division	Apps	Goals	Apps	Goals	Apps	Goals	Apps	Goals	Apps	Goals
Cagliari	2011–12	Serie A	2	0	0	0	—		—		2	0
Cagliari	2012–13	Serie A	13	0	2	0	—		—		15	0
Cagliari	2013–14	Serie A	21	0	1	0	—		—		22	0
Cagliari	2014–15	Serie A	8	0	2	0	—		—		10	0
Cagliari	2015–16	Serie B	28	0	3	0	—		—		31	0
Cagliari	2016–17	Serie A	26	0	1	0	—		—		27	0
Cagliari	Total		98	0	9	0	—		—		107	0
Sampdoria	2017–18	Serie A	20	0	3	0	—		—		23	0
Sampdoria	2018–19	Serie A	35	0	2	0	—		—		37	0
Sampdoria	2019–20	Serie A	28	0	1	0	—		—		29	0
Sampdoria	2021–22	Serie A	22	1	2	0	—		—		24	1
Sampdoria	2022–23	Serie A	20	0	1	0	—		—		21	0
Sampdoria	2023–24	Serie B	23	1	1	0	—		—		24	1
Sampdoria	Total		148	2	10	0	—		0	0	158	2
Torino (loan)	2020–21	Serie A	14	0	3	0	—		—		17	0
Career total			260	2	22	0	0	0	0	0	282	2

== Honours ==
Cagliari

- Serie B: 2015–16
