= Soufiane Bidaoui =

Moroccan footballer

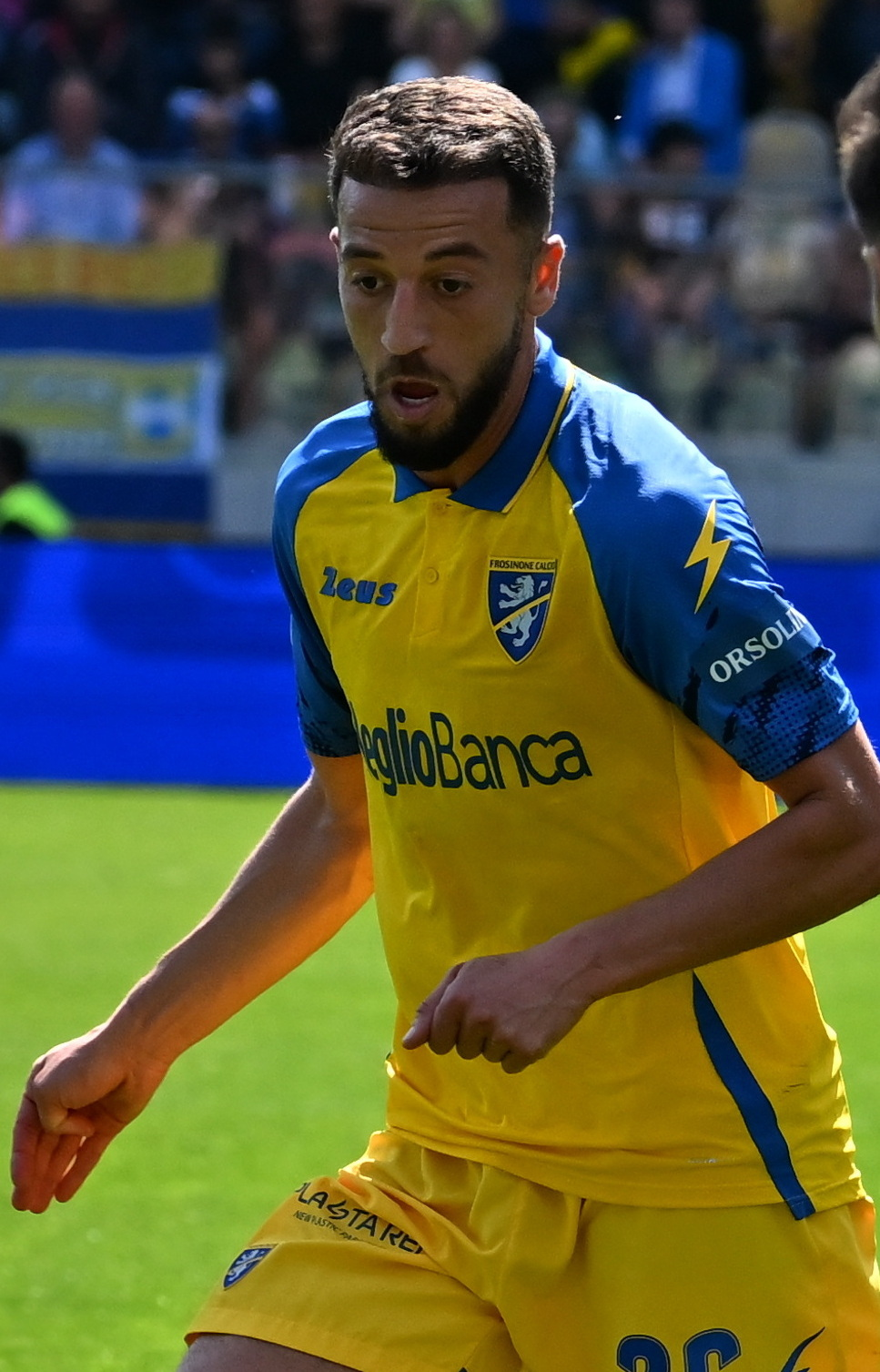
- Bidoui in 2023

Personal information
- Date of birth: 20 April 1990 (age 36)
- Place of birth: Etterbeek, Belgium
- Position: Left winger

Senior career*
Years	Team	Apps	(Gls)
2009–2010	Westerlo	2	(0)
2010–2011	Roeselare	11	(2)
2011–2013	Lierse	39	(2)
2013–2015	Parma	4	(0)
2013–2014	→ Crotone (loan)	38	(3)
2015	→ Latina (loan)	15	(2)
2016–2018	Avellino	41	(3)
2018–2020	Spezia	39	(7)
2021–2023	Ascoli	65	(9)
2023–2024	Frosinone	8	(0)
2024–2025	SPAL	17	(1)

International career
2012	Morocco U23	3	(0)
- * Club domestic league appearances and goals as of 27 April 2025

Soufiane Bidaoui (born 20 April 1990) is a professional footballer who plays as a midfielder. Born in Belgium, he represented Morocco at the 2012 Summer Olympics.

== Club career ==
Born in Etterbeek, Belgium, Bidaoui has played club football in Belgium for Westerlo, Roeselare and Lierse. In the summer of 2013, Bidaoui signed a contract with Italian team Parma. He joined Crotone on loan for the 2013–14 season.

On 11 July 2016 Bidaoui signed a two-year contract with Avellino, which included an option for an additional season.

On 20 August 2018, he joined Serie B club Spezia.

On 14 January 2021 he signed with Ascoli.

On 31 January 2023, Bidaoui moved to Frosinone on a one-and-a-half-year contract.

On 4 September 2024, Bidaoui joined SPAL in Serie C on a two-season contract.

== International career ==
Bidaoui represented Morocco at the 2012 Summer Olympics.
