= Marcello Falzerano =

Italian footballer

Personal information
- Date of birth: 12 April 1991 (age 35)
- Place of birth: Pagani, Italy
- Height: 1.67 m (5 ft 5 1/2 in)
- Positions: Winger; midfielder

Team information
- Current team: Città di Fasano
- Number: 7

Youth career
- Edipro Roma
- 2006–2009: Savio
- 2008–2009: → Salernitana (loan)
- 2009–2010: Salernitana

Senior career*
Years	Team	Apps	(Gls)
2010–2011	Salernitana	15	(1)
2011–2012	Avellino	11	(0)
2012	→ Latina (loan)	10	(0)
2012–2013	Grosseto	3	(0)
2013–2014	Ascoli	13	(1)
2014	Gubbio	13	(4)
2014–2015	Pistoiese	35	(5)
2015–2017	Bassano	53	(5)
2017–2019	Venezia	70	(5)
2019–2022	Perugia	113	(7)
2022–2024	Ascoli	55	(1)
2024–2025	Monopoli	33	(0)
2025–	Città di Fasano	7	(0)
- * Club domestic league appearances and goals as of 11 January 2026

Marcello Falzerano (born 12 April 1991) is an Italian footballer who plays as a winger or midfielder for Serie D club Città di Fasano.

== Career ==
=== Youth career ===
Born in Pagani, the province of Salerno, Campania, Falzerano started his career at Rome club G.S. Edipro Roma. He was selected to Lazio regional Giovanissimi representative team in April 2006. In mid-2006 Falzerano left for Savio. The two Allievi teams of the club finished as the runner-up of Lazio region Allievi league and losing semi-finalists of Lazio Allievi Fascia B respectively. Falzerano mainly played for the latter, losing to S.S. Lazio. At the end of season he was selected to the Lazio Allievi representatives, to 2007 Coppa Nazionale Primavera, an event competed by the representatives of Italian regions.

=== Salernitana ===
On 1 September 2008 Falzerano joined Serie B team Salernitana, located in Salerno. After the team relegated in 2009–10 Serie B, Falzerano made his first team debut. He was selected to 2011 Lega Pro Quadrangular Tournament for Italy U20 Serie C team, losing to Lega Pro Second Division/B 0–2.

=== Chievo and co-ownership ===
Salernitana bankrupted in summer 2011. Falzerano was signed by Serie A club A.C. ChievoVerona, and sold to Avellino in co-ownership deal. Falzerano spent 5 months with the Campania team. On 24 January 2012 Falzerano was signed by Latina, returning to Lazio region after 3 1/2 seasons. He played 11 games for the club in the league as well as in relegation "play-out". Latina beat Triestina in the playoffs and secured a place in the third division for the next season .

Right before joined Latina, Falzerano also selected to the prima divisione Group A under-21 representative team, for 2012 Lega Pro Quadrangular Tournament. Prima Divisione Group A team won that tournament.

On 21 June 2012 Chievo bought back Falzerano. In July 2012 Falzerano left for Serie B club U.S. Grosseto F.C. and Chievo bought back Falzerano again on 20 June 2013.

=== Lega Pro return ===
Falzerano was released during the summer transfer windows. On 10 September 2013 he signed a 1-year contract with Ascoli. On 9 January 2014 he was signed by Gubbio.

After a good season with Pistoiese, he joined Bassano.

=== Venezia ===
On 31 January 2017, Bassano sold him to Venezia outright.

=== Perugia ===
On 10 January 2019, Falzerano joined Perugia.

=== Return to Ascoli ===
On 26 July 2022, Falzerano returned to Ascoli.
