= Enrico Guarna =

Italian footballer (born 1985)

Personal information
- Date of birth: 11 August 1985 (age 41)
- Place of birth: Catanzaro, Italy
- Height: 1.85 m (6 ft 1 in)
- Position: Goalkeeper

Team information
- Current team: L'Aquila

Senior career*
Years	Team	Apps	(Gls)
2001–2002	Locri	4	(0)
2002–2005	Ascoli	0	(0)
2005–2007	Lanciano	20	(0)
2007–2008	Ancona	33	(0)
2008–2013	Ascoli	149	(0)
2013	Spezia	13	(0)
2013–2017	Bari	84	(0)
2016–2017	→ Foggia (loan)	36	(0)
2017–2018	Foggia	31	(0)
2018–2019	Monza	31	(0)
2019–2021	Reggina	37	(0)
2021–2023	Ascoli	14	(0)
2023–	L'Aquila	0	(0)
- * Club domestic league appearances and goals as of 30 October 2023

Enrico Guarna (born 11 August 1985) is an Italian professional footballer who plays as a goalkeeper for Serie D club L'Aquila.

== Club career ==
On 6 July 2021, he returned to Ascoli on a two-year contract.
