= Danilo Quaranta =

Italian footballer (born 1997)

Personal information
- Date of birth: 23 March 1997 (age 29)
- Place of birth: Teramo, Italy
- Height: 1.92 m (6 ft 3 1/2 in)
- Position: Defender

Team information
- Current team: Reggiana
- Number: 14

Youth career
- –2016: Ascoli

Senior career*
Years	Team	Apps	(Gls)
2016–2025	Ascoli	102	(2)
2016–2017	→ Olbia (loan)	15	(0)
2017–2018	→ Pistoiese (loan)	33	(0)
2019–2020	→ Catanzaro (loan)	10	(0)
2025	Juve Stabia	9	(0)
2025–	Reggiana	13	(0)
- * Club domestic league appearances and goals as of 13 May 2026

Danilo Quaranta (born 23 March 1997) is an Italian professional footballer who plays for Serie C Group B club Reggiana.

== Club career ==
He made his Serie C debut for Olbia on 4 September 2016 in a game against Lucchese.

On 2 September 2019, he joined Catanzaro on loan.

On 17 January 2025, Quaranta signed a one-and-a-half-year contract with Juve Stabia in Serie B.

On 4 August 2025, Quaranta moved to Reggiana on a two-season contract.
