= Mirko Eramo =

Italian professional football player

Personal information
- Date of birth: 12 July 1989 (age 37)
- Place of birth: Acquaviva delle Fonti, Italy
- Height: 1.84 m (6 ft 0 in)
- Position: Midfielder

Youth career
- Bari

Senior career*
Years	Team	Apps	(Gls)
2006–2007	Bari	7	(1)
2007–2011	Sampdoria	0	(0)
2008–2009	→ Piacenza (loan)	16	(0)
2009–2010	→ Monza (loan)	32	(4)
2010–2011	→ Crotone (loan)	32	(2)
2011–2013	Crotone	71	(9)
2013–2017	Sampdoria	1	(0)
2014	→ Empoli (loan)	14	(0)
2014–2015	→ Ternana (loan)	24	(0)
2015–2016	→ Trapani (loan)	41	(3)
2017	Benevento	19	(0)
2017–2020	Virtus Entella	79	(8)
2020–2023	Ascoli	91	(3)

International career
2007	Italy U-18	1	(0)
2009	Italy U-20	1	(0)
2011	Italy B	1	(0)
- * Club domestic league appearances and goals as of 2 September 2023

Mirko Eramo (born 12 July 1989) is an Italian professional football player who plays as a midfielder.

== Club career ==
On 31 January 2020, he signed a 2.5-year contract with Ascoli. On 15 September 2023, Eramo's contract with Ascoli was terminated by mutual consent.
