= Michele Collocolo =

Italian footballer

Personal information
- Date of birth: 8 November 1999 (age 27)
- Place of birth: Taranto, Italy
- Height: 1.88 m (6 ft 2 in)
- Position: Midfielder

Team information
- Current team: Cremonese
- Number: 18

Youth career
- –2018: Cosenza

Senior career*
Years	Team	Apps	(Gls)
2016–2019	Cosenza	3	(0)
2018–2019	→ Francavilla (loan)	29	(1)
2019–2020	Rende	30	(1)
2020–2021	Cesena	29	(3)
2021–2023	Ascoli	70	(7)
2023–	Cremonese	65	(11)
- * Club domestic league appearances and goals as of 25 May 2026

Michele Collocolo (born 8 November 1999) is an Italian footballer who plays as a midfielder for Serie B club Cremonese.

== Club career ==
He made his professional Serie C debut for Cosenza on 7 May 2016 in a game against Ischia.

On 12 July 2021, he signed a three-year contract with Serie B club Ascoli. He made his Serie B debut for Ascoli on 22 August 2021 against Cosenza.

On 22 July 2023, Collocolo signed a four-year contract with Cremonese.
