= Fabrizio Caligara =

Italian professional footballer

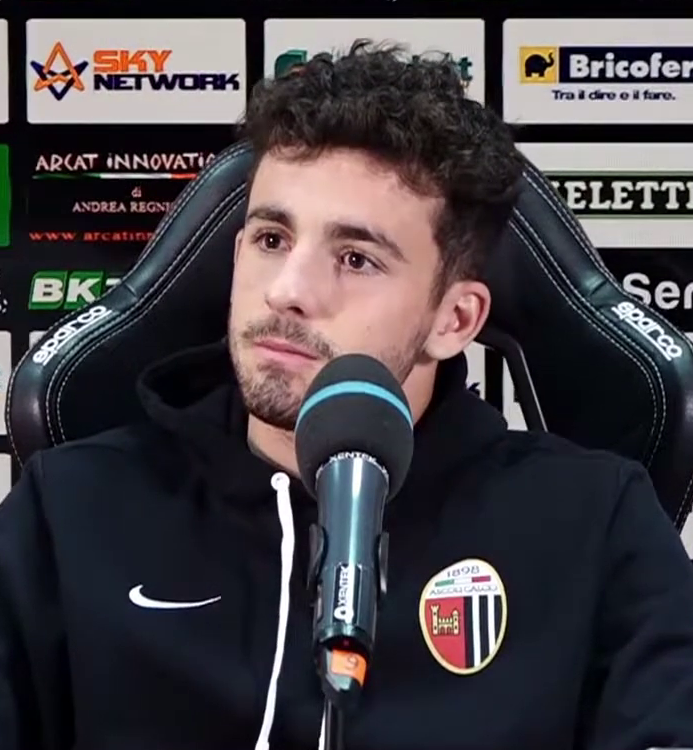

Personal information
- Date of birth: 12 April 2000 (age 26)
- Place of birth: Borgomanero, Italy
- Height: 1.80 m (5 ft 11 in)
- Position: Midfielder

Team information
- Current team: Catania

Youth career
- –2017: Juventus

Senior career*
Years	Team	Apps	(Gls)
2017–2018	Juventus	0	(0)
2018–2022	Cagliari	11	(0)
2018–2019	→ Olbia (loan)	6	(0)
2019–2020	→ Venezia (loan)	16	(1)
2021–2022	→ Ascoli (loan)	47	(3)
2022–2024	Ascoli	59	(7)
2024–2026	Sassuolo	4	(0)
2025	→ Salernitana (loan)	7	(0)
2025–2026	→ Pescara (loan)	28	(2)
2026–	Catania	0	(0)

International career^{‡}
2015–2016	Italy U16	9	(1)
2016–2017	Italy U17	15	(2)
2017–2018	Italy U19	4	(0)
- * Club domestic league appearances and goals as of 29 August 2026 ‡ National team caps and goals as of 10 September 2018

Fabrizio Caligara (born 12 April 2000) is an Italian professional footballer who plays as a midfielder for Serie C Group C club Catania.

== Club career ==
Caligara is a youth exponent from Juventus. On 12 September 2017, he made his senior debut for the club in the UEFA Champions League in a 3–0 away loss to Barcelona where he came on as a substitute for Gonzalo Higuaín after 87 minutes. On 1 February 2018, Caligara was signed by Cagliari. On 17 April 2018, he made his senior debut in Serie A, at Stadio San Siro against Inter where he came out as a substitute of Andrea Cossu after 73 minutes.

On 16 August 2018, Caligara joined to Olbia on loan until 30 June 2019.

On 20 July 2019, Caligara joined Serie B side Venezia on loan until 30 June 2020.

On 1 February 2021, Caligara was loaned to Ascoli in Serie B for the remainder of the 2020–21 season. On 11 August 2021, he returned to Ascoli on a new loan with an obligation to buy.

On 20 July 2024, Caligara signed with Sassuolo in Serie B. On 16 January 2025, he moved to Salernitana on loan with a conditional obligation to buy. On 1 September 2025, Caligara was loaned out to Pescara.

== International career ==
Caligara has represented Italy at U16, U17 and U19 levels.

== Career statistics ==
=== Club ===
As of 1 February 2021

Club	Season	League			Cup		Europe		Other		Total	
Club	Season	Division	Apps	Goals	Apps	Goals	Apps	Goals	Apps	Goals	Apps	Goals
Juventus	2017–18	Serie A	0	0	0	0	1	0	0	0	1	0
Cagliari	2018–19	Serie A	1	0	0	0	—		—		1	0
Cagliari	2020–21	Serie A	10	0	2	0	—		—		12	0
Cagliari	Total		11	0	2	0	0	0	0	0	13	0
Olbia (loan)	2018–19	Serie C	6	0	—		—		—		6	0
Venezia (loan)	2019–20	Serie B	16	1	0	0	—		—		16	1
Ascoli (loan)	2020–21	Serie B	0	0	—		—		—		0	0
Career total			33	1	2	0	1	0	0	0	36	1
