= 2026–27 Panathinaikos F.C. season =

Panathinaikos
2026–27 season
- Chairman: Giannis Alafouzos
- Manager: Jacob Neestrup
- Stadium: Athens Olympic Stadium
- Super League: 1st
- Greek Cup: League phase
- UEFA Conference League: League phase
- Top goalscorer: League: Andrews Tetteh (5 goals); All: Cyriel Dessers (10 goals)
- Highest home attendance: 32,969 (vs AEK Athens) (1 November 2026)
- Lowest home attendance: 10,863 (vs Kifisia (10 September 2026)
- Biggest win: 5–1 (vs Asteras Tripolis (H); 18 October 2026; Super League Greece); 1–5 (vs FC Kairat (A); 22 October 2026; UEFA Conference League)
- Biggest defeat: 0–1 (vs Olympiacos (A); 11 October 2026; Super League Greece)
Home colours	Away colours	Third colours

The 2026–27 season is the 119th season since the club's founding and the 68th consecutive season in the top flight of Greek football. Panathinaikos is participating in the Greek Super League, the Greek Cup, and the UEFA Conference League. They play all of their home matches at the Athens Olympic Stadium. The season run from 1 July 2026 to 30 June 2027.

== Season overview ==
On 22 May 2026, Rafael Benítez was sacked by Panathinaikos as manager after finishing 4th in the league. On 26 May 2026, Copenhagen manager Jacob Neestrup was announced as the club's new manager.

== Coaching staff ==
As of 17 June 2026

Position	Staff
Head coach	(Denmark) Jacob Neestrup
First Assistant coach	(Denmark) Stefan Madsen
Second Assistant coach	(Denmark) Morten Mølkjær
Third Assistant coach	(Portugal) Zeca
Head of Performance	(Denmark) Anders Storskov
Assistant Physical Trainer	(Greece) Angelos Kontarinis
First Goalkeeper coach	(Denmark) Casper Ankergren
Second Goalkeeper coach	(Greece) Giorgos Mountakis
Analysts	(Denmark) Nicklas Pedersen (Greece) Giannis Antonopoulos (Greece) Alexandros Maniatoglou (Greece) Iraklis Tsarouchis
Assistant Rehabilitation Coach	(Greece) Panagiotis Papatheodorou

== Players ==
=== Squad information ===
As of 17 September 2026

No.	Name	Nationality	Position (s)	Date of Birth (Age)	Signed from	Notes
Goalkeepers
1	Iñaki Peña	(Spain)	GK	2 March 1999 (age 27)	(Spain) Barcelona	
12	Lucas Chaves	(Argentina)	GK	9 August 1995 (age 31)	(Argentina) Argentinos Juniors	loan
70	Konstantinos Kotsaris	(Greece)	GK	25 July 1996 (age 30)	(Greece) Kalamata	
71	Christos Gitonas	(Greece)	GK	28 September 2009 (age 17)	Youth system	
Defenders
2	Davide Calabria	(Italy)	RB	6 December 1996 (age 29)	(Italy) Milan	
3	Giorgos Katris	(Greece)	CB	14 October 2005 (age 21)	(Greece) Levadiakos	
5	Anass Salah-Eddine	(Morocco) (Netherlands)	LB	18 January 2002 (age 24)	(Italy) Roma	loan
6	Stefan de Vrij	(Netherlands)	CB	5 February 1992 (age 34)	(Italy) Inter Milan	
14	Erik Palmer-Brown	(United States)	CB	24 April 1997 (age 29)	(France) Troyes	
15	Sverrir Ingi Ingason	(Iceland)	CB	5 August 1993 (age 33)	(Denmark) Midtjylland	
19	Triantafyllos Tsapras	(Greece)	RB	22 October 2001 (age 25)	(Greece) Levadiakos	
34	Victor Kristiansen	(Denmark)	LB	16 December 2002 (age 23)	(England) Leicester City	loan
55	Rick van Drongelen	(Netherlands)	CB	20 December 1998 (age 27)	(Turkey) Samsunspor	
56	Vasilis Labdas	(Greece)	CB	22 January 2009 (age 17)	Youth system	
77	Georgios Kyriakopoulos	(Greece)	LB	5 February 1996 (age 30)	(Italy) Monza	
Midfielders
4	Pedro Chirivella	(Spain)	DM / MF	23 May 1997 (age 29)	(France) Nantes	
8	Adriano Jagušić	(Croatia)	AM	6 September 2005 (age 21)	(Croatia) Slaven Belupo	
10	Santino Andino	(Argentina) (Italy)	LW	25 October 2005 (age 21)	(Argentina) Godoy Cruz	
17	Pavlos Pantelidis	(Greece)	RW / LW	16 September 2002 (age 24)	(Greece) A.E. Kifisia	
18	Sotiris Kontouris	(Greece)	DM / MF	24 February 2005 (age 21)	(Greece) Panetolikos	
20	Vicente Taborda	(Argentina) (Italy)	AM	14 June 2001 (age 25)	(Argentina) Boca Juniors	
21	Azzedine Ounahi	(Morocco)	MF	19 April 2000 (age 26)	(Spain) Girona	
22	Etienne Camara	(France) (Guinea)	DM / MF	30 March 2003 (age 23)	(Belgium) Royal Charleroi	
26	Imrân Louza	(Morocco) (France)	DM / MF	1 May 1999 (age 27)	(England) Watford	
28	Facundo Pellistri	(Uruguay) (Spain)	RW / LW	20 December 2001 (age 24)	(England) Manchester United	
39	Giannis Bokos	(Greece)	RW	3 February 2007 (age 19)	Youth system	
42	Kings Kangwa	(Zambia)	MF	6 April 1999 (age 27)	(Israel) Hapoel Be'er Sheva	
44	Panagiotis Biniaris	(Greece)	MF	25 July 2009 (age 17)	Youth system	
Forwards
7	Andrews Tetteh	(Greece) (Ghana)	CF	25 May 2001 (age 25)	(Greece) A.E. Kifisia	
9	Cyriel Dessers	(Nigeria) (Belgium)	CF	8 December 1994 (age 31)	(Scotland) Rangers	
53	Iason Nempis	(Greece)	CF	9 February 2009 (age 17)	Youth system	
74	Elmin Rastoder	(North Macedonia) (Switzerland)	CF	7 October 2001 (age 25)	(Switzerland) Thun	
99	Levi García	(Trinidad and Tobago)	LW / FW	20 November 1997 (age 29)	(Russia) Spartak Moscow	loan

== Other players under contract ==
No.	Name	Nationality	Position (s)	Date of Birth (Age)	Signed from	Notes
--	Moussa Sissoko	(France)	MF	16 August 1989 (age 37)	(England) Watford	

== Transfers ==
=== Summer window ===
==== In ====
Squad #	Position	Player	Transferred from	Fee	Date	Ref
24	DF	(Greece) Nikolaos Nikoletopoulos	(Greece) Panargiakos	Loan return	1 July 2026	
25	MF	(Albania) Enis Çokaj	(Greece) Levadiakos	Loan return	1 July 2026	
29	MF	(Greece) Dimitrios Limnios	(Netherlands) Fortuna Sittard	Loan return	1 July 2026	
30	MF	(Greece) Odysseas Lazaris	(Greece) Marko	Loan return	1 July 2026	
34	MF	(Portugal) Miguel Tavares	(Greece) A.E. Kifisia	Loan return	1 July 2026	
41	MF	(Greece) Markos Spatharis	(Bosnia and Herzegovina) Sarajevo B	Loan return	1 July 2026	
64	MF	(Greece) Christos Kryparakos	(Greece) PAS Giannina	Loan return	1 July 2026	
67	DF	(Greece) Athanasios Prodromitis	(Greece) Kallithea	Loan return	1 July 2026	
82	GK	(Greece) Georgios Karakasidis	(Greece) Iraklis	Loan return	1 July 2026	
11	MF	(Morocco) Anass Zaroury	(France) Lens	€2,700,000	1 July 2026	
12	GK	(Argentina) Lucas Chaves	(Argentina) Argentinos Juniors	Loan	1 July 2026	
22	MF	(France) Etienne Camara	(Belgium) Royal Charleroi	€4,000,000	1 July 2026	
19	DF	(Greece) Triantafyllos Tsapras	(Greece) Levadiakos	€2,700,000	1 July 2026	
1	GK	(Spain) Iñaki Peña	(Spain) Barcelona	€3,000,000	1 July 2026	
74	FW	(North Macedonia) Elmin Rastoder	(Switzerland) Thun	€3,500,000	1 July 2026	
6	DF	(Netherlands) Stefan de Vrij	(Italy) Inter Milan	Free	1 July 2026	
57	MF	(Albania) Aidon Shehu	(England) Hull City Academy	€1,000,000	1 July 2026	
34	DF	(Denmark) Victor Kristiansen	(England) Leicester City	Loan	13 July 2026	
55	DF	(Netherlands) Rick van Drongelen	(Turkey) Samsunspor	€4,800,000	19 July 2026	
42	MF	(Zambia) Kings Kangwa	(Israel) Hapoel Be'er Sheva	€4,200,000	31 July 2026	
99	FW	(Trinidad and Tobago) Levi García	(Russia) Spartak Moscow	Loan	5 August 2026	
26	MF	(Morocco) Imrân Louza	(England) Watford	€7,000,000	28 August 2026	
21	MF	(Morocco) Azzedine Ounahi	(Spain) Girona	€11,000,000	3 September 2026	
5	DF	(Morocco) Anass Salah-Eddine	(Italy) Roma	Loan	14 September 2026	

==== Out ====
Squad #	Position	Player	Transferred To	Fee	Date	Ref
8	MF	(Portugal) Renato Sanches	(France) Paris Saint-Germain	End of loan	1 July 2026	
26	DF	(Spain) Javi Hernández	(Spain) CD Leganés	End of loan	1 July 2026	
40	GK	(Ivory Coast) Alban Lafont	(France) Nantes	End of loan	1 July 2026	
25	MF	(Albania) Enis Çokaj	(Germany) VfL Bochum	Free transfer	1 July 2026	
27	DF	(Greece) Giannis Kotsiras	(Greece) Asteras Tripolis	End of contract	1 July 2026	
31	MF	(Serbia) Filip Đuričić	(Cyprus) APOEL	End of contract	1 July 2026	
19	CF	(Poland) Karol Świderski	(Poland) Widzew Łódź	€1,000,000	1 July 2026	
71	GK	(Greece) Loukas Stamellos	(Greece) A.E. Kifisia	Co-ownership	1 July 2026	
--	DF	(Greece) Nektarios Kaloskamis	(Greece) A.E. Kifisia	Loan	1 July 2026	
29	MF	(Greece) Dimitrios Limnios	(Cyprus) APOEL	Free	1 July 2026	
24	DF	(Greece) Nikolaos Nikoletopoulos	(Greece) Marko	Free	11 July 2026	
67	DF	(Greece) Athanasios Prodromitis	(Greece) Panetolikos	Free	13 July 2026	
30	MF	(Greece) Odysseas Lazaris	(Greece) PAS Pyrgos 1968	Free	20 July 2026	
--	DF	(Greece) Angelos Vyntra	(Cyprus) PAC Omonia 29M	Loan	24 July 2026	
--	MF	(Greece) Rushit Zeka	(Cyprus) PAC Omonia 29M	Loan	24 July 2026	
--	FW	(Greece) Giorgos Sokos	(Cyprus) PAC Omonia 29M	Loan	24 July 2026	
21	DF	(Croatia) Tin Jedvaj	(Saudi Arabia) Al Shabab	Free transfer	26 July 2026	
24	MF	(Greece) Manolis Siopis	(Turkey) Fatih Karagümrük	Free transfer	27 July 2026	
34	MF	(Portugal) Miguel Tavares	(Greece) Panionios	Free transfer	8 August 2026	
52	MF	(Netherlands) Tonny Vilhena	(Netherlands) Willem II	Free	26 August 2026	
5	DF	(Algeria) (Belgium) Ahmed Touba	(France) Le Havre	Loan	27 August 2026	
16	MF	(Slovenia) Adam Čerin	(United Arab Emirates) Al Wahda	€3,000,000	27 August 2026	
11	MF	(Morocco) Anass Zaroury	(United States) Columbus Crew	Loan	3 September 2026	
--	MF	(Greece) Anastasios Bakasetas	(Cyprus) APOEL	Free Transfer	5 September 2026	
72	FW	(Serbia) Miloš Pantović	(Serbia) FK Železničar Pančevo	Loan	14 September 2026	
30	MF	(Greece) Giorgos Kyriopoulos	(Greece) A.E. Kifisia	Loan	17 September 2026	
--	MF	(Albania) Aidon Shehu	(Greece) PAS Pyrgos 1968	Loan	17 September 2026	

=== Winter window ===
==== In ====
Squad #	Position	Player	Transferred from	Fee	Date	Ref

==== Out ====
Squad #	Position	Player	Transferred To	Fee	Date	Ref

== Pre-season and friendlies ==
Win Draw Loss

The pre-season began on 17 June 2026. The schedule for the friendly matches was announced alongside the preparation details.

1 July 2026 Friendly	Helmond Sport (Netherlands)	0–4	(Greece) Panathinaikos	Maurik, Netherlands
17:00 CEST		Report	Taborda 6'; Tetteh 9'; Andino 74', 85'	Stadium: Gemeentelijk Sportpark Maurik

4 July 2026 Friendly	Ajax (Netherlands)	1–3	(Greece) Panathinaikos	Ermelo, Netherlands
17:00 CEST	Konadu 44'	Report	Tetteh 15'; Zaroury 31'; Taborda 73'	Stadium: Sportpark de Zanderij; Referee: Alex Bos

11 July 2026 Friendly	Panathinaikos (Greece)	3–0	(Switzerland) Grasshopper	Athens, Greece
21:00 EEST	Jagušić 48'; Zaroury 70'; Taborda 88'	Report		Stadium: Apostolos Nikolaidis Stadium; Attendance: 14,000; Referee: Christos Vergetis

15 July 2026 Friendly	Rapid Wien (Austria)	4–1	(Greece) Panathinaikos	Hütteldorf, Austria
18:00 CEST	Tilio 14'; Adamsen 37'; Haïdara 43'; Schaub 88'	Report	Pantelidis 107'	Stadium: Allianz Stadion; Referee: Harald Lechner
Note: The teams agreed the match to have a duration of 120' instead of the typical 90'.

== Competitions ==
=== Overall record ===
Competition	First match	Last match	Starting round	Final position	Record							
Competition	First match	Last match	Starting round	Final position	Pld	W	D	L	GF	GA	GD	Win %
Super League 1	31 August 2026 (Note: The Matchday 1 fixture between Panathinaikos and A.E. Kifisia was postponed following a request by Panathinaikos, pursuant to a decision by the Super League Board of Directors on 15 June 2026. Stoiximan Super League announcement (in Greek).)	TBD	Matchday 1	TBD	11	10	0	1	24	5	+19	90.91
Superbet Greek Cup	3 September 2026	TBD	League phase	TBD	3	3	0	0	5	1	+4	100.00
UEFA Conference League	23 July 2026	TBD	Second qualifying round	TBD	9	6	3	0	20	11	+9	66.67
Total					23	19	3	1	49	17	+32	82.61

Last updated: 22 November 2026
Source: Soccerway

=== Super League Greece ===
==== League table ====
Pos	Team	Pld	W	D	L	GF	GA	GD	Pts	Qualification or relegation
1	Panathinaikos	10	9	0	1	22	5	+17	27	Qualification for the Championship play-offs
2	AEK Athens	10	7	2	1	24	6	+18	23	Qualification for the Championship play-offs
3	Olympiacos	10	7	2	1	16	5	+11	23	Qualification for the Championship play-offs
4	PAOK	10	6	1	3	19	13	+6	19	Qualification for the Championship play-offs
5	Aris	10	6	1	3	16	17	−1	19	Qualification for the Europe play-offs

Updated to match(es) played on 8 November 2026. Source: Super League Greece
Rules for classification: 1) Points; 2) Head-to-head points; 3) Head-to-head goal difference; 4) Overall goal difference.

==== Results summary ====
Overall								Home						Away					
Pld	W	D	L	GF	GA	GD	Pts	W	D	L	GF	GA	GD	W	D	L	GF	GA	GD
11	10	0	1	24	5	+19	30	6	0	0	18	3	+15	4	0	1	6	2	+4

Last updated: 22 November 2026.
Source: Super League Greece

==== Regular season matches ====
Win Draw Loss

10 September 2026 1	Panathinaikos	3–1	A.E. Kifisia	Marousi
21:15 EEST	Kangwa 53'; Taborda 81' (pen.); Rastoder 90+1'	Report	Theodoridis 74'	Stadium: Athens Olympic Stadium; Attendance: 10,863; Referee: Michalis Matsoukas (Euboea)

31 August 2026 2	Levadiakos	0–2	Panathinaikos	Levadia
19:30 EEST		Report	Kosti 3' (o.g.); Dessers 77'	Stadium: Levadia Municipal Stadium; Attendance: 1,930; Referee: Christos Vergetis (Arcadia)

6 September 2026 3	Panathinaikos	3–1	PAOK	Marousi
21:30 EEST	Taborda 29'; Tetteh 38', 53'	Report	Ugrešić 90+2'	Stadium: Athens Olympic Stadium; Attendance: 23,086; Referee: Felix Zwayer (Germany)

13 September 2026 4	Panathinaikos	3–0	Panetolikos	Marousi
21:30 EEST	Taborda 14'; Ounahi 39'; Calabria 90+2' (pen.)	Report		Stadium: Athens Olympic Stadium; Attendance: 16,099; Referee: Stavros Tsimenteridis (Kozani)

20 September 2026 5	Kalamata	0–1	Panathinaikos	Nikaia, Attica
19:30 EEST		Report	Tetteh 32'	Stadium: Neapoli Stadium (Note: The match was played at the Neapoli Stadium (home of Ionikos) due to major ongoing renovation works at the Kalamata Municipal Stadium); Attendance: 1,419; Referee: Anastasios Papapetrou (Athens)

11 October 2026 6	Olympiacos	1–0	Panathinaikos	Piraeus
21:00 EEST	Retsos 34'	Report		Stadium: Georgios Karaiskakis Stadium; Attendance: 33,113; Referee: Alejandro Hernández Hernández (Spain)

18 October 2026 7	Panathinaikos	5–1	Asteras Tripolis	Marousi
17:30 EEST	de Vrij 27'; Louza 31'; Dessers 63'; Calabria 72'; Tetteh 83'	Report	Papakanellos 60'	Stadium: Athens Olympic Stadium; Attendance: 16,284; Referee: Aggelos Evaggelou (Athens)

25 October 2026 8	Volos	0–1	Panathinaikos	Volos
18:00 EEST		Report	Dessers 47'	Stadium: Panthessaliko Stadium; Attendance: 13,133; Referee: Konstantinos Tsetsilas (Kastoria)

1 November 2026 9	Panathinaikos	2–0	AEK Athens	Marousi
19:00 EET	Tetteh 1'; Andino 49'	Report		Stadium: Athens Olympic Stadium; Attendance: 32,969; Referee: Sven Jablonski (Germany)

8 November 2026 10	Iraklis	1–2	Panathinaikos	Thessaloniki
17:30 EET	Pedro Marques 17'	Report	Dessers 56'; Calabria 90+4' (pen.)	Stadium: Kaftanzoglio Stadium; Attendance: 7,055; Referee: Aggelos Evaggelou (Athens)

22 November 2026 11	Panathinaikos	2–0	OFI	Marousi
17:30 EET	García 52'; Jagušić 85'	Report		Stadium: Athens Olympic Stadium; Referee: Anastasios Papapetrou (Athens)

29 November 2026 12	Atromitos	v	Panathinaikos	Peristeri
17:00 EET				Stadium: Peristeri Stadium

6 December 2026 13	Panathinaikos	v	Aris	Marousi
17:30 EET				Stadium: Athens Olympic Stadium

13 December 2026 14	PAOK	v	Panathinaikos	Thessaloniki
19:30 EET				Stadium: Toumba Stadium

20 December 2026 15	Panathinaikos	v	Iraklis	Marousi
17:30 EET				Stadium: Athens Olympic Stadium

10 January 2027 16	Asteras Tripolis	v	Panathinaikos	Tripoli
17:00 EET				Stadium: Theodoros Kolokotronis Stadium

January 2027 17	OFI	v	Panathinaikos	Heraklion
--:-- EET				Stadium: Pankritio Stadium

January 2027 18	Panathinaikos	v	Atromitos	Marousi
--:-- EET				Stadium: Athens Olympic Stadium

January 2027 19	Panathinaikos	v	Olympiacos	Marousi
--:-- EET				Stadium: Athens Olympic Stadium

February 2027 20	Aris	v	Panathinaikos	Thessaloniki
--:-- EET				Stadium: Kleanthis Vikelidis Stadium

February 2027 21	Panathinaikos	v	Kalamata	Marousi
--:-- EET				Stadium: Athens Olympic Stadium

February 2027 22	Panetolikos	v	Panathinaikos	Agrinio
--:-- EET				Stadium: Panetolikos Stadium

February 2027 23	Panathinaikos	v	Volos	Marousi
--:-- EET				Stadium: Athens Olympic Stadium

March 2027 24	A.E. Kifisia	v	Panathinaikos	Ampelokipoi
--:-- EET				Stadium: Apostolos Nikolaidis Stadium

March 2027 25	Panathinaikos	v	Levadiakos	Marousi
--:-- EET				Stadium: Athens Olympic Stadium

March 2027 26	AEK Athens	v	Panathinaikos	Nea Filadelfeia
--:-- EET				Stadium: Agia Sophia Stadium

=== Greek Football Cup ===
Panathinaikos will enter the Greek Football Cup at the League phase.

==== League phase ====
Pos	Team	Pld	W	D	L	GF	GA	GD	Pts	Qualification
1	Olympiacos	3	3	0	0	9	2	+7	9	Advance to Quarter-finals
2	Panathinaikos	3	3	0	0	5	1	+4	9	Advance to Quarter-finals
3	PAOK	3	2	1	0	4	1	+3	7	Advance to Quarter-finals
4	AEK Athens	3	2	0	1	11	4	+7	6	Advance to Quarter-finals
5	Atromitos	3	2	0	1	4	2	+2	6	Advance to Play-offs (seeded)

Updated to match(es) played on 28 October 2026. Source: League Phase Results and Standings

==== League phase matches ====
Win Draw Loss

3 September 2026 1	Panathinaikos	1–0	Niki Volos	Athens
21:00 EEST	Taborda 59'	Report		Stadium: Athens Olympic Stadium; Referee: Konstantinos Tsetsilas (Kastoria)

16 September 2026 3	A.E. Kifisia	0–2	Panathinaikos	Athens
17:45 EEST		Report	Ounahi 76' (pen.), 89'	Stadium: Apostolos Nikolaidis Stadium; Referee: Athanasios Tzilos (Larissa)

28 October 2026 4	Panathinaikos	2–1	Aris	Athens
17:30 EEST	Kontouris 10'; Rastoder 89'	Report	Kadewere 65'	Stadium: Athens Olympic Stadium; Referee: Alexandros Tsakalidis (Chalkidiki)

2 December 2026 5	Olympiacos	v	Panathinaikos	Piraeus
--:-- EET				Stadium: Georgios Karaiskakis Stadium

===== Results summary =====
Overall								Home						Away					
Pld	W	D	L	GF	GA	GD	Pts	W	D	L	GF	GA	GD	W	D	L	GF	GA	GD
3	3	0	0	5	1	+4	9	2	0	0	3	1	+2	1	0	0	2	0	+2

Last updated: 2026-10-28.

=== UEFA Conference League ===
==== Second qualifying round ====
The draw for the second qualifying round was held on 17 June 2026.

Win Draw Loss

23 July 2026 First leg	Paksi (Hungary)	1–2	(Greece) Panathinaikos	Paks, Hungary
21:00 CEST	Böde 71'	Report	Vas 41' (o.g.); Andino 55'	Stadium: Fehérvári úti Stadion; Attendance: 3,524; Referee: Luka Bilbija (Bosnia and Herzegovina); Assistant referees: Aleksandar Smiljanić, Marko Peric

30 July 2026 Second leg	Panathinaikos (Greece)	2–2 (4–3 agg.)	(Hungary) Paksi	Athens, Greece
21:30 EEST	Jagušić 44'; Rastoder 85'	Report	Pető 35'; Győrfi 57'	Stadium: Athens Olympic Stadium; Attendance: 22,414; Referee: Marc Nagtegaal (Netherlands); Assistant referees: Stefan De Groot, Johan Balder

==== Third qualifying round ====
The draw for the third qualifying round was held on 20 July 2026.

Win Draw Loss

5 August 2026 First leg	Panathinaikos (Greece)	1–1	(Bulgaria) CSKA 1948	Athens, Greece
21:30 EEST	Jagušić 21'	Report	Rusev 31'	Stadium: Athens Olympic Stadium; Attendance: 17,929; Referee: Matteo Marchetti (Italy); Assistant referees: Khaled Bahri, Valerio Vecchi

11 August 2026 Second leg	CSKA 1948 (Bulgaria)	1–2 (a.e.t.) (2–3 agg.)	(Greece) Panathinaikos	Sofia, Bulgaria
20:30 EEST	Dvali 87'	Report	García 60'; Dessers 95'	Stadium: Vasil Levski National Stadium (Note: CSKA 1948 played their third qualifying round home match at Vasil Levski National Stadium in Sofia, rather than at their regular home ground, Stadion Bistritsa in Bistritsa, which did not fulfil UEFA requirements.); Attendance: 2,654; Referee: Jasper Vergoote (Belgium); Assistant referees: Michael Geerolf, Martijn Tiesters

==== Play-off round ====
The draw for the play-off round was held on 3 August 2026.

Win Draw Loss

20 August 2026 First leg	Panathinaikos (Greece)	2–2	(Czech Republic) Hradec Králové	Athens, Greece
21:30 EEST	Tetteh 55', 61'	Report	Umar 89', 90+6'	Stadium: Athens Olympic Stadium; Attendance: 14,647; Referee: Jérôme Brisard (France); Assistant referees: Alexis Auger, Aurélien Berthomieu

27 August 2026 Second leg	Hradec Králové (Czech Republic)	1–2 (a.e.t.) (3–4 agg.)	(Greece) Panathinaikos	Hradec Králové, Czech Republic
20:00 CEST	Darida 90+2'	Report	Dessers 72', 120+5' (pen.)	Stadium: Malšovická aréna Attendance: 9,300; Referee: Sascha Stegemann (Germany); Assistant referees: Christof Günsch, Marco Achmüller

==== League phase ====
The draw for the league phase pairings was held on 28 August 2026.

Pos	Team	Pld	W	D	L	GF	GA	GD	Pts	Qualification
1	(Switzerland) Lugano	3	3	0	0	11	4	+7	9	Advance to round of 16 (seeded)
2	(Greece) Panathinaikos	3	3	0	0	9	3	+6	9	Advance to round of 16 (seeded)
3	(Netherlands) Twente	3	3	0	0	8	2	+6	9	Advance to round of 16 (seeded)
4	(France) Monaco	3	3	0	0	7	1	+6	9	Advance to round of 16 (seeded)
5	(England) Brighton & Hove Albion	3	2	1	0	5	0	+5	7	Advance to round of 16 (seeded)

Updated to match(es) played on 5 November 2026. Source: UEFA
Rules for classification: League phase tiebreakers

Round	1	2	3	4	5	6
Ground	H	A	H	A	A	H
Result	W	W	W			
Position	10	1	2			
Points	3	3	3			

Source: UEFA
A = Away; H = Home; W = Win; D = Draw; L = Loss

===== Matches =====
15 October 2026 1	Panathinaikos (Greece)	2–1	(Bosnia and Herzegovina) Borac Banja Luka	Athens, Greece
19:45 EEST	Dessers 10' (pen.); Kangwa 70'	Report	Jojić 80'	Stadium: Athens Olympic Stadium; Attendance: 21,363; Referee: Bence Csonka (Hungary); Assistant referees: Balázs Buzás, Norbert Bornemissza

22 October 2026 2	FC Kairat (Kazakhstan)	1–5	(Greece) Panathinaikos	Almaty, Kazakhstan
17:30 EEST	Bekbolat 79'	Report	Taborda 6'; Dessers 24' (pen.), 47'; Kangwa 57'; Rastoder 74'	Stadium: Almaty Central Stadium; Attendance: 9,437; Referee: Allard Lindhout (Netherlands); Assistant referees: Johan Balder, Dyon Fikkert

5 November 2026 3	Panathinaikos (Greece)	2–1	(Bulgaria) CSKA Sofia	Athens, Greece
22:00 EET	Calabria 41'; Taborda 68'	Report	Dinis Almeida 44'	Stadium: Athens Olympic Stadium; Attendance: 20,505; Referee: Mohammed Al Hakim (Sweden); Assistant referees: Mehmet Culum, Fredrik Klyver

26 November 2026 4	Nordsjælland (Denmark)	v	(Greece) Panathinaikos	Farum, Denmark
22:00 EET				Stadium: Right to Dream Park

10 December 2026 5	SC Freiburg (Germany)	v	(Greece) Panathinaikos	Freiburg, Germany
19:45 EET				Stadium: Europa-Park Stadion

17 December 2026 6	Panathinaikos (Greece)	v	(England) Brighton & Hove Albion	Athens, Greece
22:00 EET				Stadium: Athens Olympic Stadium

== Statistics ==
=== Appearances and goals ===
As of match played 22 November 2026

Players with no appearances are not included on the list.

No.	Pos	Nat	Player	Total		Super League		Greek Cup		Conference League	
No.	Pos	Nat	Player	Apps	Goals	Apps	Goals	Apps	Goals	Apps	Goals
Goalkeepers
1	GK	(Spain) ESP	Iñaki Peña	23	0	11	0	3	0	9	0
Defenders
2	DR	(Italy) ITA	Davide Calabria	14	4	11	3	0	0	2+1	1
3	DC	(Greece) GRE	Giorgos Katris	9	0	0+1	0	2+1	0	2+3	0
5	DL	(Morocco) MAR	Anass Salah-Eddine	7	0	3+3	0	1	0	0	0
6	DC	(Netherlands) NED	Stefan de Vrij	22	1	11	1	1+1	0	9	0
14	DC	(United States) USA	Erik Palmer-Brown	5	0	0	0	3	0	1+1	0
19	DR	(Greece) GRE	Triantafyllos Tsapras	10	0	0+3	0	2	0	5	0
55	DC	(Netherlands) NED	Rick van Drongelen	20	0	11	0	1+1	0	6+1	0
77	DL	(Greece) GRE	Georgios Kyriakopoulos	21	0	8+2	0	2	0	9	0
Midfielders
4	DM	(Spain) ESP	Pedro Chirivella	9	0	0+1	0	1	0	4+3	0
8	AM	(Croatia) CRO	Adriano Jagušić	14	3	0+3	1	3	0	3+5	2
10	LW	(Argentina) ARG	Santino Andino	22	2	11	1	0+2	0	8+1	1
17	RW	(Greece) GRE	Pavlos Pantelidis	1	0	0	0	0	0	0+1	0
18	DM	(Greece) GRE	Sotiris Kontouris	9	1	0+2	0	3	1	0+4	0
20	AM	(Argentina) ARG	Vicente Taborda	19	6	7+3	3	0+1	1	5+3	2
21	MF	(Morocco) MAR	Azzedine Ounahi	8	3	4+2	1	0+1	2	1	0
22	DM	(France) FRA	Etienne Camara	21	0	9+1	0	0+2	0	8+1	0
26	MF	(Morocco) MAR	Imrân Louza	15	1	5+6	1	1+1	0	2	0
28	RW	(Uruguay) URU	Facundo Pellistri	11	0	0+2	0	3	0	2+4	0
42	MF	(Zambia) ZAM	Kings Kangwa	15	3	8+2	1	2	0	2+1	2
44	MF	(Greece) GRE	Panagiotis Biniaris	4	0	0+2	0	1+1	0	0	0
Forwards
7	FW	(Greece) GRE	Andrews Tetteh	19	7	8+3	5	1	0	5+2	2
9	ST	(Nigeria) NGR	Cyriel Dessers	18	10	6+4	4	1+1	0	2+4	6
53	FW	(Greece) GRE	Iason Nempis	1	0	0	0	0+1	0	0	0
74	ST	(North Macedonia) MKD	Elmin Rastoder	19	4	0+9	1	2	1	3+5	2
99	FW	(Trinidad and Tobago) TTO	Levi Garcia	18	2	8+3	1	0+2	0	4+1	1
Players who featured but left the club during the season.
5	DC	(Algeria) ALG	Ahmed Touba	3	0	0	0	0	0	2+1	0
11	RW	(Morocco) MAR	Anass Zaroury	4	0	0	0	0	0	3+1	0
16	MF	(Slovenia) SLO	Adam Gnezda Čerin	4	0	0	0	0	0	2+2	0

=== Goalscorers ===
As of match played 22 November 2026

Rank	No.	Pos.	Nat.	Player	Total	Super League	Greek Cup	Conference League
1	9	ST	(Nigeria)	Cyriel Dessers	10	4	0	6
2	7	FW	(Greece)	Andrews Tetteh	7	5	0	2
3	20	AM	(Argentina)	Vicente Taborda	6	3	1	2
4	2	DF	(Italy)	Davide Calabria	4	2	0	1
4	74	ST	(North Macedonia)	Elmin Rastoder	4	1	1	2
6	8	MF	(Croatia)	Adriano Jagušić	3	0	0	2
6	21	MF	(Morocco)	Azzedine Ounahi	3	1	2	0
6	42	MF	(Zambia)	Kings Kangwa	3	1	0	2
9	10	LW	(Argentina)	Santino Andino	2	1	0	1
9	99	FW	(Trinidad and Tobago)	Levi Garcia	2	1	0	1
11	6	CB	(Netherlands)	Stefan de Vrij	1	1	0	0
11	18	DM	(Greece)	Sotiris Kontouris	1	0	1	0
11	26	MF	(Morocco)	Imrân Louza	1	1	0	0
Own goals					2	1	0	1
Totals					47	22	5	20

=== Assists ===
As of match played 22 November 2026

Rank	No.	Pos.	Nat.	Player	Total	Super League	Greek Cup	Conference League
1	10	LW	(Argentina)	Santino Andino	6	3	1	2
2	77	LB	(Greece)	Georgios Kyriakopoulos	5	3	1	1
3	7	FW	(Greece)	Andrews Tetteh	4	2	0	2
4	26	MF	(Morocco)	Imrân Louza	3	2	0	1
4	20	AM	(Argentina)	Vicente Taborda	3	2	0	1
4	42	MF	(Zambia)	Kings Kangwa	3	3	0	0
7	2	RB	(Italy)	Davide Calabria	2	2	0	0
7	4	DM	(Spain)	Pedro Chirivella	2	1	0	1
9	6	CB	(Netherlands)	Stefan de Vrij	1	0	0	1
9	99	FW	(Trinidad and Tobago)	Levi Garcia	1	0	1	0
Totals					29	17	3	9
