= 2025–26 Panathinaikos F.C. season =

Panathinaikos
2025–26 season
- Chairman: Giannis Alafouzos
- Manager: Rui Vitória (until 15 September 2025); Dimitrios Koropoulis (caretaker, from 16 September 2025 until 17 September 2025); Christos Kontis (caretaker, from 18 September 2025 until 24 October 2025); Rafael Benitez
- Stadium: Leoforos Alexandras Stadium (domestic matches); Athens Olympic Stadium (european matches)
- Super League: 4th (Play-offs); 4th (Regular season)
- Greek Cup: Semi-finals
- UEFA Champions League: Second qualifying round
- UEFA Europa League: Round of 16
- Top goalscorer: League: Karol Świderski; Anastasios Bakasetas (5 each); All: Karol Świderski; Anastasios Bakasetas (9 each)
- Highest home attendance: 36,121 (vs Rangers) (30 July 2025)
- Lowest home attendance: 5,516 (vs A.E. Kifisia) (1 February 2026)
- Average home league attendance: 9,149
- Biggest win: 1–4 (vs Young Boys (A); 25 September 2025; UEFA Europa League); 0–3 (vs Panserraikos (A); 23 November 2025; Super League Greece); 3–0 (vs Panserraikos (H); 11 January 2026; Super League Greece); 3–0 (vs Aris (H); 14 January 2026; Betsson Greek Cup); 3–0 (vs A.E. Kifisia (H); 1 February 2026; Super League Greece); 4–1 (vs OFI (H); 4 March 2026; Super League Greece); 1–4 (vs Levadiakos (A); 8 March 2026; Super League Greece)
- Biggest defeat: 0–4 (vs AEK Athens (A); 18 January 2026; Super League Greece); 0–4 (vs Real Betis (A); 19 March 2026; UEFA Europa League)
Home colours	Away colours	Third colours

The 2025–26 season was the 118th season since the club's founding and the 67th consecutive season in the top flight of Greek football. Panathinaikos participated in the Greek Super League, the Greek Cup, and the Europa League having been eliminated in the second qualifying round of the UEFA Champions League. They played their domestic home matches at the Leoforos Alexandras Stadium, while all European home matches were held at the Athens Olympic Stadium. The season ran from 1 July 2025 to 30 June 2026.

== Coaching staff ==
As of 24 October 2025

Position	Staff
Head coach	(Spain) Rafael Benítez
Assistant coach	(Spain) Antonio Gómez
Fitness coach	(Spain) Paco De Miguel Moreno
Goalkeeper coaches	(Greece) Giorgos Mountakis (Spain) Joaquín Valerio
Analysts	(Spain) Jesus Garcia Vallejo (Greece) Giannis Antonopoulos (Greece) Alexandros Maniatoglou (Greece) Iraklis Tsarouchis
Rehabilitation trainer	(Greece) Angelos Konstantinos Kontarinis

== Players ==
=== Squad information ===
As of 6 February 2026

No.	Name	Nationality	Position (s)	Date of Birth (Age)	Signed from	Notes
Goalkeepers
12	Lucas Chaves	(Argentina)	GK	9 August 1995 (age 31)	(Argentina) Argentinos Juniors	loan
40	Alban Lafont	(Ivory Coast) (France)	GK	23 January 1999 (age 27)	(France) Nantes	loan
70	Konstantinos Kotsaris	(Greece)	GK	25 July 1996 (age 30)	(Greece) Kalamata	
Defenders
2	Davide Calabria	(Italy)	RB	6 December 1996 (age 29)	(Italy) Milan	
3	Giorgos Katris	(Greece)	CB	14 October 2005 (age 20)	(Greece) Levadiakos	
5	Ahmed Touba	(Algeria) (Belgium)	CB	13 March 1998 (age 28)	(Turkey) İstanbul Başakşehir	
14	Erik Palmer-Brown	(United States)	CB	24 April 1997 (age 29)	(France) Troyes	
15	Sverrir Ingi Ingason	(Iceland)	CB	5 August 1993 (age 33)	(Denmark) Midtjylland	
21	Tin Jedvaj	(Croatia)	CB	28 November 1995 (age 30)	(Russia) Lokomotiv Moscow	
26	Javi Hernández	(Spain)	LB	2 May 1998 (age 28)	(Spain) CD Leganés	loan
27	Giannis Kotsiras	(Greece)	RB / RM	16 December 1992 (age 33)	(Greece) Asteras Tripolis	
77	Georgios Kyriakopoulos	(Greece)	LB	5 February 1996 (age 30)	(Italy) Monza	
Midfielders
4	Pedro Chirivella	(Spain)	DM / MF	23 May 1997 (age 29)	(France) Nantes	
6	Manolis Siopis	(Greece)	DM / MF	14 May 1994 (age 32)	(Wales) Cardiff City	
8	Renato Sanches	(Portugal) (São Tomé and Príncipe)	CM / AM	18 August 1997 (age 29)	(France) Paris Saint-Germain	loan
9	Anass Zaroury	(Morocco) (Belgium)	LW / RW	7 November 2000 (age 25)	(France) Lens	loan
10	Santino Andino	(Argentina) (Italy)	LW	25 October 2005 (age 20)	(Argentina) Godoy Cruz	
11	Anastasios Bakasetas	(Greece)	AM	28 June 1993 (age 33)	(Turkey) Trabzonspor	
16	Adam Gnezda Čerin	(Slovenia)	MF	16 July 1999 (age 27)	(Germany) 1. FC Nürnberg	
17	Moussa Sissoko	(France) (Mali)	MF	16 August 1989 (age 37)	(England) Watford	
18	Sotiris Kontouris	(Greece)	DM / MF	24 February 2005 (age 21)	(Greece) Panetolikos	
20	Vicente Taborda	(Argentina) (Italy)	AM	14 June 2001 (age 25)	(Argentina) Boca Juniors	
22	Georgios Kyriopoulos	(Greece)	LW / AM	24 August 2004 (age 21)	Youth system	
23	Pavlos Pantelidis	(Greece)	RW / LW	16 September 2002 (age 23)	(Greece) A.E. Kifisia	
28	Facundo Pellistri	(Uruguay) (Spain)	RW / LW	20 December 2001 (age 24)	(England) Manchester United	
31	Filip Đuričić	(Serbia)	AM	30 January 1992 (age 34)	(Italy) Sampdoria	
39	Giannis Bokos	(Greece)	RW	3 February 2007 (age 19)	Youth system	
52	Tonny Vilhena	(Netherlands) (Angola)	MF	3 January 1995 (age 31)	(Spain) Espanyol	
88	Adriano Jagušić	(Croatia)	AM	6 September 2005 (age 20)	(Croatia) Slaven Belupo	
Forwards
7	Andrews Tetteh	(Greece) (Ghana)	CF	25 May 2001 (age 25)	(Greece) A.E. Kifisia	
19	Karol Świderski	(Poland)	CF	23 January 1997 (age 29)	(United States) Charlotte FC	
33	Cyriel Dessers	(Nigeria) (Belgium)	CF	8 December 1994 (age 31)	(Scotland) Rangers	
72	Miloš Pantović	(Serbia)	CF	24 August 2002 (age 23)	(Serbia) Bačka Topola	

== Transfers ==
=== Summer window ===
==== In ====
Squad #	Position	Player	Transferred from	Fee	Date	Ref
--	MF	(Albania) Enis Çokaj	(Greece) Levadiakos	Loan return	30 June 2025	
22	MF	(Greece) Georgios Kyriopoulos	(Greece) A.E. Kifisia	Loan return	30 June 2025	
64	MF	(Greece) Christos Kryparakos	(Greece) Niki Volos	Loan return	30 June 2025	
67	DF	(Greece) Athanasios Prodromitis	(Greece) Niki Volos	Loan return	30 June 2025	
34	MF	(Portugal) Miguel Tavares	(Greece) Panachaiki	Loan return	30 June 2025	
52	MF	(Netherlands) Tonny Vilhena	(Turkey) Alanyaspor	Loan return	30 June 2025	
77	DF	(Greece) Georgios Kyriakopoulos	(Italy) Monza	€2,000,000	6 June 2025	
5	DF	(Algeria) Ahmed Touba	(Turkey) İstanbul Başakşehir	€1,000,000	13 June 2025	
4	MF	(Spain) Pedro Chirivella	(France) Nantes	€2,000,000	28 June 2025	
40	GK	(Ivory Coast) Alban Lafont	(France) Nantes	Loan	17 July 2025	
70	GK	(Greece) Konstantinos Kotsaris	(Greece) Kalamata	Free	21 July 2025	
9	MF	(Morocco) Anass Zaroury	(France) Lens	Loan	3 August 2025	
2	DF	(Italy) Davide Calabria	(Italy) AC Milan	Free	17 August 2025	
8	MF	(Portugal) Renato Sanches	(France) Paris Saint-Germain	Loan	24 August 2025	
72	FW	(Serbia) Miloš Pantović	(Serbia) TSC	€1,500,000	31 August 2025	
33	FW	(Nigeria) Cyriel Dessers	(Scotland) Rangers	€5,000,000	1 September 2025	
20	MF	(Argentina) Vicente Taborda	(Argentina) Boca Juniors	€4,300,000	2 September 2025	

==== Out ====
Squad #	Position	Player	Transferred To	Fee	Date	Ref
8	MF	(Morocco) Azzedine Ounahi	(France) Marseille	End of loan	30 June 2025	
6	MF	(Portugal) Zeca	Retired		30 June 2025	
5	DF	(Netherlands) Bart Schenkeveld	(Saudi Arabia) Al-Khaleej	End of contract	30 June 2025	
4	MF	(Spain) Rubén Pérez	(Greece) A.E. Kifisia	End of contract	30 June 2025	
23	DF	(Iceland) Hörður Magnússon	(Greece) Levadiakos	End of contract	30 June 2025	
55	MF	(Brazil) Willian Arão	(Brazil) Santos	End of contract	30 June 2025	
81	GK	(Albania) Klidman Lilo	(Greece) OFI	End of contract	30 June 2025	
--	MF	(Albania) Enis Çokaj	(Greece) Levadiakos	Loan	4 July 2025	
18	MF	(Greece) Dimitrios Limnios	(Netherlands) Fortuna Sittard	Loan	16 July 2025	
2	DF	(Greece) Georgios Vagiannidis	(Portugal) Sporting CP	€13,000,000	6 August 2025	
1	GK	(Russia) Yuri Lodygin	(Greece) Levadiakos	Free	8 August 2025	
20	MF	(Serbia) Nemanja Maksimović	(United Arab Emirates) Shabab Al Ahli Club	€5,000,000	15 August 2025	
7	FW	(Greece) Fotis Ioannidis	(Portugal) Sporting CP	€22,000,000	1 September 2025	
82	GK	(Greece) Georgios Karakasidis	(Greece) Iraklis	Loan	6 September 2025	

=== Winter window ===
==== In ====
Squad #	Position	Player	Transferred from	Fee	Date	Ref
7	FW	(Greece) Andrews Tetteh	(Greece) A.E. Kifisia	€2,200,000	30 October 2025	
23	FW	(Greece) Pavlos Pantelidis	(Greece) A.E. Kifisia	€800,000	30 October 2025	
18	MF	(Greece) Sotiris Kontouris	(Greece) Panetolikos	€700,000	30 December 2025	
12	GK	(Argentina) Lucas Chaves	(Argentina) Argentinos Juniors	Loan	6 January 2026	
3	DF	(Greece) Giorgos Katris	(Greece) Levadiakos	Loan return	17 January 2026	
10	MF	(Argentina) Santino Andino	(Argentina) Godoy Cruz	€8,400,000	22 January 2026	
17	MF	(France) Moussa Sissoko	(England) Watford	€300,000	2 February 2026	
26	DF	(Spain) Javi Hernández	(Spain) CD Leganés	Loan	2 February 2026	
88	MF	(Croatia) Adriano Jagušić	(Croatia) Slaven Belupo	€5,200,000	6 February 2026	

==== Out ====
Squad #	Position	Player	Transferred To	Fee	Date	Ref
29	FW	(Sweden) Alexander Jeremejeff	(Greece) PAOK	End of contract	17 December 2025	
30	MF	(Greece) Adriano Bregou	(Greece) Panetolikos	Free	30 December 2025	
3	DF	(Germany) Philipp Max	(Japan) Gamba Osaka	Free	7 January 2026	
10	MF	(Brazil) Tetê	(Brazil) Grêmio	€6,500,000	11 January 2026	
34	MF	(Portugal) Miguel Tavares	(Greece) A.E. Kifisia	Loan	12 January 2026	
69	GK	(Poland) Bartłomiej Drągowski	(Poland) Widzew Łódź	€800,000	12 January 2026	
44	MF	(Greece) Georgios Nikas	(Greece) Levadiakos	Free	23 January 2026	
26	DF	(Albania) Elton Fikaj	(Poland) Piast Gliwice	Free	27 January 2026	
17	MF	(Argentina) Daniel Mancini	(Cyprus) APOEL	Free	30 January 2026	
25	DF	(Serbia) Filip Mladenović	(Turkey) Fatih Karagümrük	Free	6 February 2026	

== Pre-season and friendlies ==
2 July 2025 Friendly	(Greece) Panathinaikos	3–0	(Ukraine) Metalist 1925 Kharkiv	Angerberg
12:00	Mancini 59'; Bokos 72'; Świderski 89'	Report		Stadium: Sportplatz Angerberg

5 July 2025 Friendly	(Greece) Panathinaikos	0–1	(Denmark) Nordsjælland	Kössen
15:00		Report	59' (pen.) Egeli	Stadium: Kaiserwinkl Arena
Note: 120-minute match (3×40 minutes)

9 July 2025 Friendly	(Greece) Panathinaikos	0–0	(Germany) Schalke 04	Schwaz
19:00		Report		Stadium: Silberstadt Arena

12 July 2025 Friendly	(Greece) Panathinaikos	1–2	(Portugal) Braga	Kössen
16:00	Ioannidis 71'	Report	39' Horta; 56' Ouazzani	Stadium: Kaiserwinkl Arena

16 July 2025 Friendly	(Greece) Panathinaikos	3–1	(Belgium) Westerlo	Athens
21:00	Čerin 41'; Pellistri 55'; Bregou 84'	Report	90' Vaesen	Stadium: Athens Olympic Stadium; Referee: Vasilios Fotias

== Competitions ==
=== Overall record ===
Competition	First match	Last match	Starting round	Final position	Record							
Competition	First match	Last match	Starting round	Final position	Pld	W	D	L	GF	GA	GD	Win %
Super League 1	31 August 2025^{*}	17 May 2026	Matchday 2	4th	32	14	10	8	47	33	+14	43.75
Betsson Greek Cup	17 September 2025	11 February 2026	League phase	Semi-finals	7	5	0	2	9	5	+4	71.43
UEFA Champions League	22 July 2025	30 July 2025	Second qualifying round	Second qualifying round	2	0	1	1	1	3	−2	0.00
UEFA Europa League	7 August 2025	19 March 2026	Third qualifying round	Round of 16	16	5	8	3	17	17	+0	31.25
Total					57	24	19	14	74	58	+16	42.11

Last updated: 17 May 2026
Source: Competitions

^{*} First scheduled season game with OFI was on 24/09/25 but was postponed due to Europa League qualifiers commitments. New date was on 04/03/26

=== Super League Greece ===
==== League table ====
Pos	Team	Pld	W	D	L	GF	GA	GD	Pts	Qualification or relegation
2	Olympiacos	26	17	7	2	45	11	+34	58	Qualification for the Championship play-offs
3	PAOK	26	17	6	3	52	17	+35	57	Qualification for the Championship play-offs
4	Panathinaikos	26	14	7	5	44	26	+18	49	Qualification for the Championship play-offs
5	Levadiakos	26	12	6	8	51	37	+14	42	Qualification for the Europe play-offs
6	OFI	26	10	2	14	34	45	−11	32	Qualification for the Europe play-offs

Source: Super League Greece
Rules for classification: 1) Points; 2) Head-to-head points; 3) Head-to-head goal difference; 4) Overall goal difference; 5) Goals scored; 6) Total wins; 7) Away goals scored; 8) Away wins.

==== Results summary ====
Overall								Home						Away					
Pld	W	D	L	GF	GA	GD	Pts	W	D	L	GF	GA	GD	W	D	L	GF	GA	GD
26	14	7	5	44	26	+18	49	8	4	1	25	10	+15	6	3	4	19	16	+3

Last updated: 22 March 2026.
Source: Super League Greece

==== Regular season ====
4 March 2026 1	Panathinaikos	4–1	OFI	Ampelokipoi
18:00	Jedvaj 7'; Sanches 15'; Andino 51'; Zaroury 86'	Report	Salcedo 45+1'	Stadium: Leoforos Alexandras Stadium; Attendance: 6,986; Referee: Angelos Evangelou

31 August 2025 2	Panathinaikos	1–1	Levadiakos	Ampelokipoi
22:00	Djuricic 1'	Report	Verbic 86'	Stadium: Leoforos Alexandras Stadium; Attendance: 9,279; Referee: Ioannis Papadopoulos

14 September 2025 3	A.E. Kifisia	3–2	Panathinaikos	Volos
18:00	Tetei 7'; Pantelidis 79'; Sousa 90+4'	Report	Świderski 15' (pen.), 53'	Stadium: Panthessaliko Stadium; Attendance: 1,359; Referee: Konstantinos Katikos

21 September 2025 4	Panathinaikos	1–1	Olympiacos	Ampelokipoi
21:00	Dessers 48'	Report	El Kaabi 90+2'	Stadium: Leoforos Alexandras Stadium; Attendance: 11,880; Referee: Deniz Aytekin

28 September 2025 5	Panetolikos	1–2	Panathinaikos	Agrinio
21:00	Aguirre 18' (pen.)	Report	Tetê 57'; Jeremejeff 90+5'	Stadium: Panetolikos Stadium; Attendance: 2,450; Referee: Alexandros Tsakalidis

6 October 2025 6	Panathinaikos	1–0	Atromitos	Ampelokipoi
21:30	Čerin 48'	Report		Stadium: Leoforos Alexandras Stadium; Attendance: Behind Closed Doors; Referee: Fotis Polychronis

19 October 2025 7	Aris	1–1	Panathinaikos	Thessaloniki
19:30	Donis 75'	Report	Świderski 3'	Stadium: Kleanthis Vikelidis Stadium; Attendance: 7,921; Referee: Felix Zwayer

26 October 2025 8	Panathinaikos	2–0	Asteras Tripolis	Ampelokipoi
17:30	Świderski 45+5' (pen.); Chicco 68' (o.g.)	Report		Stadium: Leoforos Alexandras Stadium; Attendance: 8,377; Referee: Athanasios Tzilos

1 November 2025 9	Volos	1–0	Panathinaikos	Volos
18:00	Lamprou 23'	Report		Stadium: Panthessaliko Stadium; Attendance: 6,394; Referee: Anastasios Papapetrou

9 November 2025 10	Panathinaikos	2–1	PAOK	Ampelokipoi
21:00	Pantović 20'; Jedvaj 31'	Report	Konstantelias 61'	Stadium: Leoforos Alexandras Stadium; Attendance: 11,114; Referee: Daniel Schlager

23 November 2025 11	Panserraikos	0–3	Panathinaikos	Serres
17:00		Report	Zaroury 40'; Jedvaj 60'; Bakasetas 69'	Stadium: Serres Municipal Stadium; Attendance: 4,573; Referee: Angelos Evangelou

30 November 2025 12	Panathinaikos	2–3	AEK Athens	Ampelokipoi
21:00	Tetê 71'; Djuricic 90'	Report	Jovic 16', 45+2' (pen.), 90+3' (pen.)	Stadium: Leoforos Alexandras Stadium; Attendance: 13,565; Referee: Robert Schröder

7 December 2025 13	AEL	2–2	Panathinaikos	Larissa
17:30	Facundo Pérez 37'; Pasas 90+9' (pen.)	Report	Calabria 43'; Bakasetas 74' (pen.)	Stadium: AEL FC Arena; Attendance: 5,651; Referee: Angelos Evangelou

14 December 2025 14	Panathinaikos	2–1	Volos	Ampelokipoi
21:00	Dessers 5'; Bakasetas 22' (pen.)	Report	Comba 45+1'	Stadium: Leoforos Alexandras Stadium; Attendance: 6,056; Referee: Vasileios Fotias

21 December 2025 15	PAOK	2–0	Panathinaikos	Thessaloniki
19:30	Konstantelias 39'; Mythou 53'	Report		Stadium: Toumba Stadium; Attendance: 22,938; Referee: Irfan Peljto

11 January 2026 16	Panathinaikos	3–0	Panserraikos	Marousi
21:00	Djuricic 4'; Zaroury 15' (pen.); Jedvaj 39'	Report		Stadium: Athens Olympic Stadium; Attendance: 13,349; Referee: Konstantinos Katoikos

18 January 2026 17	AEK Athens	4–0	Panathinaikos	Nea Filadelfeia
21:00	Jović 15', 57', 65', 78'	Report		Stadium: Agia Sophia Stadium; Attendance: 30,921; Referee: Rade Obrenović

25 January 2026 18	Atromitos	0–0	Panathinaikos	Peristeri
19:30		Report		Stadium: Peristeri Stadium; Attendance: 1,600; Referee: Christos Vergetis

1 February 2026 19	Panathinaikos	3–0	A.E. Kifisia	Ampelokipoi
17:30	Tetteh 21'; Świderski 81'; Taborda 84'	Report		Stadium: Leoforos Alexandras Stadium; Attendance: 5,516; Referee: Giannis Papadopoulos

8 February 2026 20	Olympiacos	0–1	Panathinaikos	Piraeus
21:00		Report	Taborda 7'	Stadium: Karaiskakis Stadium; Attendance: 32,954; Referee: Erik Lambrechts

15 February 2026 21	Panathinaikos	1–1	AEL	Ampelokipoi
21:00	Bakasetas 67'	Report	Tupta 46'	Stadium: Leoforos Alexandras Stadium; Attendance: 6,813; Referee: Dimitrios Moschou

22 February 2026 22	OFI	0–2	Panathinaikos	Heraklion
16:00		Report	Tetteh 6'; Calabria 90+8' (pen.)	Stadium: Pankritio Stadium; Attendance: Behind Closed Doors; Referee: Alexandros Katsikogiannis

1 March 2026 23	Panathinaikos	3–1	Aris	Ampelokipoi
20:00	Hernández 9'; Taborda 65'; Tetteh 80'	Report	Račić 72'	Stadium: Leoforos Alexandras Stadium; Attendance: 9,284; Referee: Tamás Bognár

8 March 2026 24	Levadiakos	1–4	Panathinaikos	Livadeia
19:00	Pedrozo 61'	Report	Hernández 37'; Bakasetas 45+3' (pen.); Kontouris 50'; Kyriakopoulos 70'	Stadium: Levadia Municipal Stadium; Attendance: 4,024; Referee: Alexandros Tsakalidis

15 March 2026 25	Panathinaikos	0–0	Panetolikos	Ampelokipoi
21:00		Report		Stadium: Leoforos Alexandras Stadium; Attendance: 7,480; Referee: Stavros Tsimenteridis

22 March 2026 26	Asteras Tripolis	1–2	Panathinaikos	Tripoli
19:00	Ingason 82' (o.g.)	Report	Zaroury 31' (pen.); Tetteh 45+4' (pen.)	Stadium: Theodoros Kolokotronis Stadium; Referee: Anastasios Papapetrou

==== Championship play-offs table ====
Pos	Team	Pld	W	D	L	GF	GA	GD	Pts	Qualification
1	AEK Athens (C)	32	21	9	2	57	20	+37	72	Qualification for the Champions League play-off round
2	Olympiacos	32	19	9	4	51	17	+34	66	Qualification for the Champions League third qualifying round (Note: Olympiacos, as one of the two clubs with the highest club coefficient that would otherwise have entered the League Path second qualifying round, will enter the League Path third qualifying round, due to the rebalancing of the default access list.)
3	PAOK	32	18	10	4	59	25	+34	64	Qualification for the Europa League second qualifying round
4	Panathinaikos	32	14	10	8	47	33	+14	52	Qualification for the Conference League second qualifying round

Source: Super League Greece
Rules for classification: 1) Points; 2) Head-to-head points (Regular season and play-off); 3) Head-to-head goal difference (Regular season and play-off); 4) Regular season position.
(C) Champions

==== Results summary ====
Overall								Home						Away					
Pld	W	D	L	GF	GA	GD	Pts	W	D	L	GF	GA	GD	W	D	L	GF	GA	GD
6	0	3	3	3	7	−4	3	0	2	1	2	4	−2	0	1	2	1	3	−2

Last updated: 13 May 2026.
Source: Super League Greece

===== Championship play-offs =====
5 April 2026 1	PAOK	0–0	Panathinaikos	Thessaloniki
19:00		Report		Stadium: Toumba Stadium; Attendance: 23,485; Referee: Damian Sylwestrzak (Poland)

19 April 2026 2	Panathinaikos	0–2	Olympiacos	Ampelokipoi
21:00		Report	Martins 33'; Rodinei 45+1'	Stadium: Leoforos Alexandras Stadium; Attendance: 12,100; Referee: Halil Umut Meler (Turkey)

3 May 2026 3	Panathinaikos	0–0	AEK Athens	Ampelokipoi
21:00		Report		Stadium: Leoforos Alexandras Stadium; Attendance: 8,608; Referee: Halil Umut Meler (Turkey)

10 May 2026 4	AEK Athens	2–1	Panathinaikos	Nea Filadelfeia
19:30	Zini 72'; Zoao Mario 90+3'	Report	Tetteh 62'	Stadium: Agia Sophia Stadium; Attendance: 31,100; Referee: Harm Osmers (Germany)

13 May 2026 5	Olympiacos	1–0	Panathinaikos	Piraeus
19:30	Rodinei 45+5'	Report		Stadium: Karaiskakis Stadium; Attendance: 30,500; Referee: Rade Obrenović (Slovenia)

17 May 2026 6	Panathinaikos	2–2	PAOK	Ampelokipoi
19:30	Čerin 68'; Taborda 81'	Report	Ozdoyev 30'; Mythou 35'	Stadium: Leoforos Alexandras Stadium; Attendance: Behind Closed Doors; Referee: Goga Kikacheishvili (Georgia)

=== Greek Football Cup ===
Panathinaikos entered the Greek Football Cup at the league phase.

==== League phase ====
17 September 2025 1	Panathinaikos	1–0	Athens Kallithea	Ampelokipoi
17:30	Dessers 30'	Report		Stadium: Leoforos Alexandras Stadium; Referee: Dimitris Moschou

29 October 2025 2	Atromitos	1–2	Panathinaikos	Peristeri
19:30	Baku 37'	Report	Pantović 49'; Mladenović 67'	Stadium: Peristeri Stadium; Referee: Alexandros Tsakalidis

2 December 2025 3	Panathinaikos	1–0	A.E. Kifisia	Ampelokipoi
19:30	Bakasetas 67' (pen.)	Report		Stadium: Leoforos Alexandras Stadium; Referee: Vasilios Fotias

17 December 2025 4	Kavala	1–2	Panathinaikos	Kavala
16:00	Sifneos 34' (pen.)	Report	Mladenovic 18'; Taborda 53'	Stadium: Anthi Karagianni Stadium; Referee: Georgios Kokkinos

===== Quarter-finals =====
14 January 2026	Panathinaikos	3–0	Aris	Marousi
20:30 EET	Bakasetas 16', 53' (pen.), 65' (pen.)	Report		Stadium: Athens Olympic Stadium; Referee: Angelos Evangelou

===== Semi-finals =====
4 February 2026 First leg	Panathinaikos	0–1	PAOK	Ampelokipoi
20:30 EET		Report	Giakoumakis 66' (pen.)	Stadium: Leoforos Alexandras Stadium; Referee: Angelos Evangelou

11 February 2026 Second leg	PAOK	2–0 (3–0 agg.)	Panathinaikos	Thessaloniki
20:30 EET	Giakoumakis 71'; Chatsidis 87'			Stadium: Toumba Stadium; Referee: Vasileios Fotias

Panathinaikos eliminated in the Semi-finals.

===== Results summary =====
Overall								Home						Away					
Pld	W	D	L	GF	GA	GD	Pts	W	D	L	GF	GA	GD	W	D	L	GF	GA	GD
7	5	0	2	9	5	+4	15	3	0	1	5	1	+4	2	0	1	4	4	0

Last updated: 2026-02-11.

=== UEFA Champions League ===
==== Second qualifying round ====
The draw for the second qualifying round was held on 18 June 2025.

22 July 2025 First leg	Rangers (Scotland)	2–0	(Greece) Panathinaikos	Glasgow, Scotland
21:45 EEST	Curtis 52'; Gassama 78'	Report		Stadium: Ibrox Stadium; Attendance: 49,548; Referee: Donatas Rumšas (Lithuania)

30 July 2025 Second leg	Panathinaikos (Greece)	1–1 (1–3 agg.)	(Scotland) Rangers	Athens, Greece
21:00 EEST	Djuricic 53'	Report	60' Gassama	Stadium: Athens Olympic Stadium; Attendance: 36,121; Referee: Simone Sozza (Italy)

=== UEFA Europa League ===
==== Third qualifying round ====
The draw for the third qualifying round was held on 21 July 2025.

7 August 2025 First leg	Panathinaikos (Greece)	0–0	(Ukraine) Shakhtar Donetsk	Athens, Greece
21:00 EEST		Report		Stadium: Athens Olympic Stadium; Attendance: 20,636; Referee: Erik Lambrechts (Belgium)

14 August 2025 Second leg	Shakhtar Donetsk (Ukraine)	0–0 (a.e.t.) (0–0 agg.) (3–4 p)	(Greece) Panathinaikos	Krakow, Poland (Note: Due to the Russian invasion of Ukraine, Ukrainian teams were required to play their home matches at neutral venues.)
21:00 EEST		Report		Stadium: Henryk Reyman Municipal Stadium; Attendance: 13,387; Referee: Daniel Siebert (Germany)
	Penalties
	Nazaryna (penalty missed); Tobias (penalty scored); Bondarenko (penalty scored); Newerton (penalty scored); Kauã Elias (penalty missed); Pedro Henrique (penalty missed)		(penalty scored) Ioannidis; (penalty scored) Jeremejeff; (penalty missed) Siopis; (penalty scored) Chirivella; (penalty missed) Zaroury; (penalty scored) Mancini

==== Play-off round ====
The draw for the third qualifying round was held on 4 August 2025.

21 August 2025 First leg	Panathinaikos (Greece)	2–1	(Turkey) Samsunspor	Athens, Greece
21:00 EEST	Kyriakopoulos 66'; Palmer-Brown 74'	Report	Tómasson 51'	Stadium: Athens Olympic Stadium; Attendance: 24,000; Referee: Juan Martínez Munuera (Spain)

28 August 2025 Second leg	Samsunspor (Turkey)	0–0 (1–2 agg.)	(Greece) Panathinaikos	Samsun, Turkey
20:00 EEST		Report		Stadium: Samsun 19 Mayıs Stadium; Attendance: 24,914; Referee: Irfan Peljto (Bosnia and Herzegovina)

==== League phase ====
The draw for the League phase was held on 29 August 2025.

Pos	Team	Pld	W	D	L	GF	GA	GD	Pts	Qualification
18	(French Football Federation) Lille	8	4	0	4	12	9	+3	12	Advance to knockout phase play-offs (unseeded)
19	(Turkish Football Federation) Fenerbahçe	8	3	3	2	10	7	+3	12	Advance to knockout phase play-offs (unseeded)
20	(Hellenic Football Federation) Panathinaikos	8	3	3	2	11	9	+2	12	Advance to knockout phase play-offs (unseeded)
21	(Scottish Football Association) Celtic	8	3	2	3	13	15	−2	11	Advance to knockout phase play-offs (unseeded)
22	(Bulgarian Football Union) Ludogorets Razgrad	8	3	1	4	12	15	−3	10	Advance to knockout phase play-offs (unseeded)

Source: UEFA
Rules for classification: League phase tiebreakers

Round	1	2	3	4	5	6	7	8
Ground	A	H	Α	A	H	H	A	H
Result	W	L	L	W	W	D	D	D
Position	1	12	22	16	14	15	19	20
Points	3	3	3	6	9	10	11	12

Source: UEFA
A = Away; H = Home; W = Win; D = Draw; L = Loss

25 September 2025 1	Young Boys (Switzerland)	1–4	(Greece) Panathinaikos	Bern, Switzerland
22:00	Janko 25'	Report	Świderski 10'; Zaroury 13', 19', 68'	Stadium: Stadion Wankdorf; Attendance: 20,023; Referee: Ricardo de Burgos Bengoetxea (Spain)

2 October 2025 2	Panathinaikos (Greece)	1–2	(Netherlands) Go Ahead Eagles	Athens, Greece
19:45	Świderski 55'	Report	Smit 75', 82'	Stadium: Olympic Stadium; Attendance: 18,808; Referee: Sebastian Gishamer (Austria)

23 October 2025 3	Feyenoord (Netherlands)	3–1	(Greece) Panathinaikos	Rotterdam, Netherlands
22:00	Read 45+3'; Moussa 55'; Larin 90'	Report	Świderski 18'	Stadium: De Kuip; Attendance: 37,169; Referee: Harm Osmers (Germany)

6 November 2025 4	Malmö (Sweden)	0–1	(Greece) Panathinaikos	Malmö, Sweden
19:45		Report	Djuricic 85'	Stadium: Malmö Stadium; Attendance: 12,531; Referee: Nick Walsh (Scotland)

27 November 2025 5	Panathinaikos (Greece)	2–1	(Austria) Sturm Graz	Athens, Greece
22:00	Świderski 18'; Calabria 74'	Report	Kiteishvili 34'	Stadium: Olympic Stadium; Attendance: 21,013; Referee: Simone Sozza (Italy)

11 December 2025 6	Panathinaikos (Greece)	0–0	(Czech Republic) Viktoria Plzeň	Athens, Greece
22:00		Report		Stadium: Olympic Stadium; Attendance: 17,335; Referee: António Nobre (Portugal)

22 January 2026 7	Ferencváros (Hungary)	1–1	(Greece) Panathinaikos	Budapest, Hungary
22:00	Yusuf 62' (pen.)	Report	Zaroury 86'	Stadium: Ferencváros Stadion; Attendance: 17,879; Referee: Mykola Balakin (Ukraine)

29 January 2026 8	Panathinaikos (Greece)	1–1	(Italy) Roma	Athens, Greece
22:00	Taborda 58'	Report	Ziółkowski 80'	Stadium: Olympic Stadium; Attendance: 27,432; Referee: Juan Martínez Munuera (Spain)

==== Knockout phase play-offs ====
The draw for the Knockout phase play-offs was held on 30 January 2026.

19 February 2025 First leg	Panathinaikos (Greece)	2–2	(Czech Republic) Viktoria Plzeň	Athens, Greece
22:00	Tetteh 31', 61'	Report	Visinsky 11'; Ladra 80'	Stadium: Olympic Stadium; Attendance: 20,227; Referee: Nick Walsh (Scotland)

26 February 2025 Second leg	Viktoria Plzeň (Czech Republic)	1–1 (a.e.t.) (3–3 agg.) (3–4 p)	(Greece) Panathinaikos	Plzeň, Czech Republic
19:45	Spáčil 62'	Report	Tetteh 9'	Stadium: Doosan Arena; Attendance: 11,244; Referee: Donatas Rumšas (Lithuania)
	Penalties
	Memić (penalty missed); Hrošovský (penalty scored); Višinský (penalty scored); Souaré (penalty missed); Valenta (penalty scored)		(penalty missed) Calabria; (penalty scored) Pellistri; (penalty scored) Đuričić; (penalty scored) Świderski; (penalty scored) Pantović

==== Round of 16 ====
The draw for the Knockout phase round of 16 was held on 27 February 2026.

12 March 2026 First leg	Panathinaikos (Greece)	1–0	(Spain) Real Betis	Athens, Greece
19:45	Taborda 88' (pen.)	Report		Stadium: Olympic Stadium; Attendance: 27,479; Referee: Szymon Marciniak (Poland)

19 March 2026 Second leg	Real Betis (Spain)	4–0 (4–1 agg.)	(Greece) Panathinaikos	Seville, Spain
22:00	Ruibal 8'; Amrabat 45+1'; Cucho 53'; Antony 66'	Report		Stadium: La Cartuja (Note: Real Betis play their home matches at La Cartuja, Seville, instead of their regular stadium, Benito Villamarín, Seville, due to renovation works.); Attendance: 60,207; Referee: Tobias Stieler (Germany)
