= Cyriel Dessers =

Nigerian footballer (born 1994)

- Dessers with Panathinaikos in 2026

Personal information
- Full name: Cyriel Kolawole Dessers
- Date of birth: 8 December 1994 (age 31)
- Place of birth: Tongeren, Belgium
- Height: 1.85 m (6 ft 1 in)
- Position: Forward

Team information
- Current team: Panathinaikos
- Number: 9

Youth career
- 2001–2005: FC De Zwaluw Vechmaal
- 2005–2006: Union FC Rutten
- 2006–2007: Tongeren
- 2007–2009: Sint-Truiden
- 2009–2011: Tongeren
- 2011–2014: OH Leuven

Senior career*
Years	Team	Apps	(Gls)
2014	OH Leuven	1	(0)
2014–2016	Lokeren	32	(4)
2016–2017	NAC Breda	40	(29)
2017–2019	FC Utrecht	47	(14)
2019–2020	Heracles Almelo	26	(15)
2020–2022	Genk	38	(10)
2021–2022	→ Feyenoord (loan)	27	(9)
2022–2023	Cremonese	26	(6)
2023–2025	Rangers	73	(34)
2025–	Panathinaikos	14	(6)

International career^{‡}
2020–	Nigeria	11	(3)
Medal record
Men's football
Representing Nigeria
Africa Cup of Nations
Third place	2025 Morocco
- * Club domestic league appearances and goals as of 8 November 2026 ‡ National team caps and goals as of 16 December 2025

Cyriel Kolawole Dessers (born 8 December 1994) is a professional footballer who plays as a forward for Greek Super League club Panathinaikos. Born in Belgium, he plays for the Nigeria national team.

Dessers has spent the majority of his club career playing in Belgian and Dutch football. He was the top scorer in the Eredivisie in the 2019–20 season, while playing for Heracles Almelo. He was the top scorer in the 2021–22 UEFA Europa Conference League and was named in the competition's Team of the Season, while playing for Feyenoord.

Dessers qualified to play for Nigeria at international level because of his Nigerian mother. He made his senior international debut in October 2020.

== Club career ==
=== OH Leuven ===
Dessers joined OH Leuven's youth system from Tongeren at the age of 16 in 2011. He had previously played youth football for FC De Zwaluw Vechmaal, Union FC Rutten and Sint-Truiden. He began studying law at university (KU Leuven) while playing for OH Leuven's youth teams. During the 2013–14 season, Dessers stood out for OH Leuven's under-19 and reserve teams, scoring 21 goals in 21 reserve games by March. With OHL in danger of relegation and several first-team strikers either out of shape, injured or suspended, he was given his first minutes in the first-team in a 3–2 away loss against Mons.

=== Lokeren ===
In April 2014, Dessers signed a two-year deal with Lokeren.

=== NAC Breda ===
In July 2016, he signed for Eerste Divisie club NAC Breda on a contract until the summer of 2019. On 28 May 2017, they were promoted to the Eredivisie after a 4–1 victory over NEC, in which Dessers scored three goals. He finished the season with 29 goals in 40 matches.

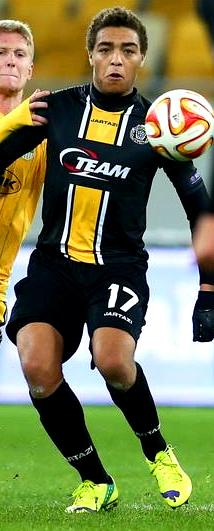
Dessers with Lokeren in 2014

=== FC Utrecht ===
In July 2017, Dessers moved to FC Utrecht, agreeing a contract for three years with an option for an additional year.

=== Heracles Almelo ===
Dessers joined Heracles Almelo in July 2019. After the 2019–20 Eredivisie season was abandoned, he was jointly awarded the top goalscorer award alongside Steven Berghuis, with 15 goals each.

=== Genk and loan to Feyenoord ===
On 30 June 2020, Dessers moved to Genk on a four-year deal.

On 31 August 2021, Dessers returned to the Netherlands to join Feyenoord on loan with an option to buy. He scored his first goal for the club on 19 September, scoring Feyenoord's fourth goal in a 4–0 away win against PSV. Dessers finished the season as UEFA Europa Conference League Top scorer with ten goals in 12 matches and was also selected for the UEFA Europa Conference League Team of the Season. Overall Dessers scored 20 goals for Feyenoord in 41 matches during season 2021–22.

On 1 June 2022, Feyenoord announced that they had opted not to exercise the option to purchase Dessers' contract.

=== Cremonese ===
On 10 August 2022, Dessers signed for Italian club Cremonese. Dessers scored seven goals for Cremonese in 29 matches. Cremonese finished 19th in the Serie A table and were relegated to Serie B.

=== Rangers ===
==== 2023–24 season ====
On 6 July 2023, Dessers joined Scottish Premiership club Rangers for an undisclosed fee. He made his debut for the club on 5 August 2023, starting in a 1–0 defeat away to Kilmarnock. Four days later, Dessers scored his first goal for Rangers, against Swiss club Servette in a Champions League qualifying tie.

On 21 April 2024 Dessers scored twice against Heart of Midlothian to send Rangers to the final of the Scottish Cup.

Following this Dessers scored another winning goal against St Mirren. Dessers' performances were praised by his manager Philippe Clement. Following this game Dessers scored his 21st goal of the season in an away match against Celtic. Dessers 22nd goal of the season came from a header against Dundee at Ibrox stadium with the assist for the goal from teammate Todd Cantwell.

==== 2024–25 season ====
After scoring a double in the league against Ross County, Rangers manager Philippe Clement praised Dessers performance stating, "It's clear [Dessers] is taking the right steps and becoming more and more important. He's growing as a player, that’s what we want".

In January 2025, Dessers scored a hat-trick in Rangers fourth round Scottish Cup tie against Fraserburgh and finished the match as team captain in the absence of James Tavernier and Jack Butland. Four days later, in a Europa League match against Manchester United, he scored Rangers equaliser in a 2–1 defeat. In March 2025 in the first game under Barry Ferguson in Europe, Rangers beat Fenerbahçe 3–1 away from home, Dessers earned plaudits after scoring and assisting, whilst also having two goals ruled narrowly offside.

=== Panathinaikos ===
On 1 September 2025, Desseres joined Greek club Panathinaikos on a permanent transfer for a reported £3.5m fee.

== International career ==
Born in Belgium to a Belgian father and Nigerian mother, Dessers chose to represent Nigeria at international level in December 2019. Earlier in his career, he was called up to the Belgium under-21 national team for a game against Moldova, but he was an unused substitute.

On 4 March 2020, he was called up by Nigeria head coach Gernot Rohr as part of the team players invited for the Africa Cup of Nations qualifying fixtures against Sierra Leone. Dessers debuted in a friendly 1–1 draw with Tunisia on 13 October 2020.

In March 2024 Dessers was called up to the Nigeria team for matches against Ghana and Mali, with Dessers scoring in the Ghana match.

In May 2025, Dessers was called up again to the Nigerian national team for the Unity Cup matches between Ghana and either of Jamaica or Trinidad and Tobago. In the first game against Ghana, he scored the opening goal against Ghana for the second consecutive time against them after being set up by Sodiq Ismaila in the 14th minute.

On 11 December 2025, Dessers was called up to the Nigeria squad for the 2025 Africa Cup of Nations.

== Career statistics ==
=== Club ===
As of match played 8 November 2026

Appearances and goals by club, season and competition
Club	Season	League			National cup (Note: Includes Belgian Cup, KNVB Cup, Coppa Italia, Scottish Cup, Greek Cup)		League cup (Note: Includes Scottish League Cup)		Continental		Other		Total	
Club	Season	Division	Apps	Goals	Apps	Goals	Apps	Goals	Apps	Goals	Apps	Goals	Apps	Goals
OH Leuven	2013–14	Belgian Pro League	1	0	0	0	—		—		1 (Note: Appearance in Belgian Pro League relegation play-offs)	0	2	0
Lokeren	2014–15	Belgian Pro League	21	4	3	3	—		3 (Note: Appearances in UEFA Europa League)	0	2 (Note: Appearances in Belgian Pro League Europa League play-offs)	0	29	7
Lokeren	2015–16	Belgian Pro League	11	0	0	0	—		—		—		11	0
Lokeren	Total		32	4	3	3	—		3	0	2	0	40	7
NAC Breda	2016–17	Eerste Divisie	36	22	0	0	—		—		4 (Note: Appearances in Eredivisie promotion play-offs)	7	40	29
Utrecht	2017–18	Eredivisie	29	9	2	2	—		5	1	3 (Note: Appearances in Eredivisie European play-offs)	0	39	12
Utrecht	2018–19	Eredivisie	11	3	2	2	—		—		4	2	17	7
Utrecht	Total		40	12	4	4	—		5	1	7	2	56	19
Heracles Almelo	2019–20	Eredivisie	26	15	3	3	—		—		—		29	18
Genk	2020–21	Belgian Pro League	32	7	2	0	—		—		—		34	7
Genk	2021–22	Belgian Pro League	3	0	0	0	—		2 (Note: Appearances in UEFA Champions League)	1	1 (Note: Appearance in Belgian Super Cup)	0	6	1
Genk	2022–23	Belgian Pro League	3	3	0	0	—		—		—		3	3
Genk	Total		38	10	2	0	—		2	1	1	0	43	11
Feyenoord (loan)	2021–22	Eredivisie	27	9	1	1	—		13 (Note: Appearances in UEFA Europa Conference League)	10	—		41	20
Cremonese	2022–23	Serie A	26	6	3	1	—		—		—		29	7
Rangers	2023–24	Scottish Premiership	35	16	4	3	4	1	11 (Note: Four appearances and one goal in UEFA Champions League, seven appearances and one goal in UEFA Europa League)	2	—		54	22
Rangers	2024–25	Scottish Premiership	35	18	2	3	4	4	14 (Note: Two appearances and one goal in UEFA Champions League, twelve appearances and three goals in UEFA Europa League)	4	—		55	29
Rangers	2025–26	Scottish Premiership	3	0	0	0	0	0	4	1	—		7	1
Rangers	Total		73	34	6	6	8	5	29	7	—		116	52
Panathinaikos	2025–26	Super League Greece	5	2	2	1	—		1	0	—		8	3
Panathinaikos	2026–27	Super League Greece	9	4	2	0	—		6 (Note: Appearances in UEFA Conference League)	6	—		17	10
Panathinaikos	Total		14	6	4	1	—		7	6	—		25	13
Career total			311	118	26	19	8	5	59	25	15	9	426	176

=== International ===
As of match played 16 December 2025

Appearances and goals by national team and year
National team	Year	Apps	Goals
Nigeria	2020	1	0
Nigeria	2021	0	0
Nigeria	2022	3	1
Nigeria	2023	0	0
Nigeria	2024	2	1
Nigeria	2025	5	1
Total		11	3

As of match played 28 May 2025
Scores and results list Nigeria's goal tally first, score column indicates score after each Dessers goal.

List of international goals scored by Cyriel Dessers
No.	Date	Venue	Opponent	Score	Result	Competition
1	28 May 2022	AT&T Stadium, Arlington, United States	Mexico	1–1	1–2	Friendly
2	22 March 2024	Marrakesh Stadium, Marrakesh, Morocco	Ghana	1–0	2–1	Friendly
3	28 May 2025	Brentford Community Stadium, London	Ghana	1–0	2–1	2025 Unity Cup

== Honours ==
Genk

- Belgian Cup: 2020–21

Feyenoord

- UEFA Conference League runner-up: 2021–22

Rangers

- Scottish League Cup: 2023–24

Nigeria

- Africa Cup of Nations third place: 2025

Individual

- Eredivisie Player of the Month: November 2019
- Eredivisie top scorer: 2019–20
- UEFA Conference League top scorer: 2021–22
- UEFA Conference League Team of the Season: 2021–22
- Scottish Premiership top scorer: 2024–25
