= Adriano Jagušić =

Croatian footballer

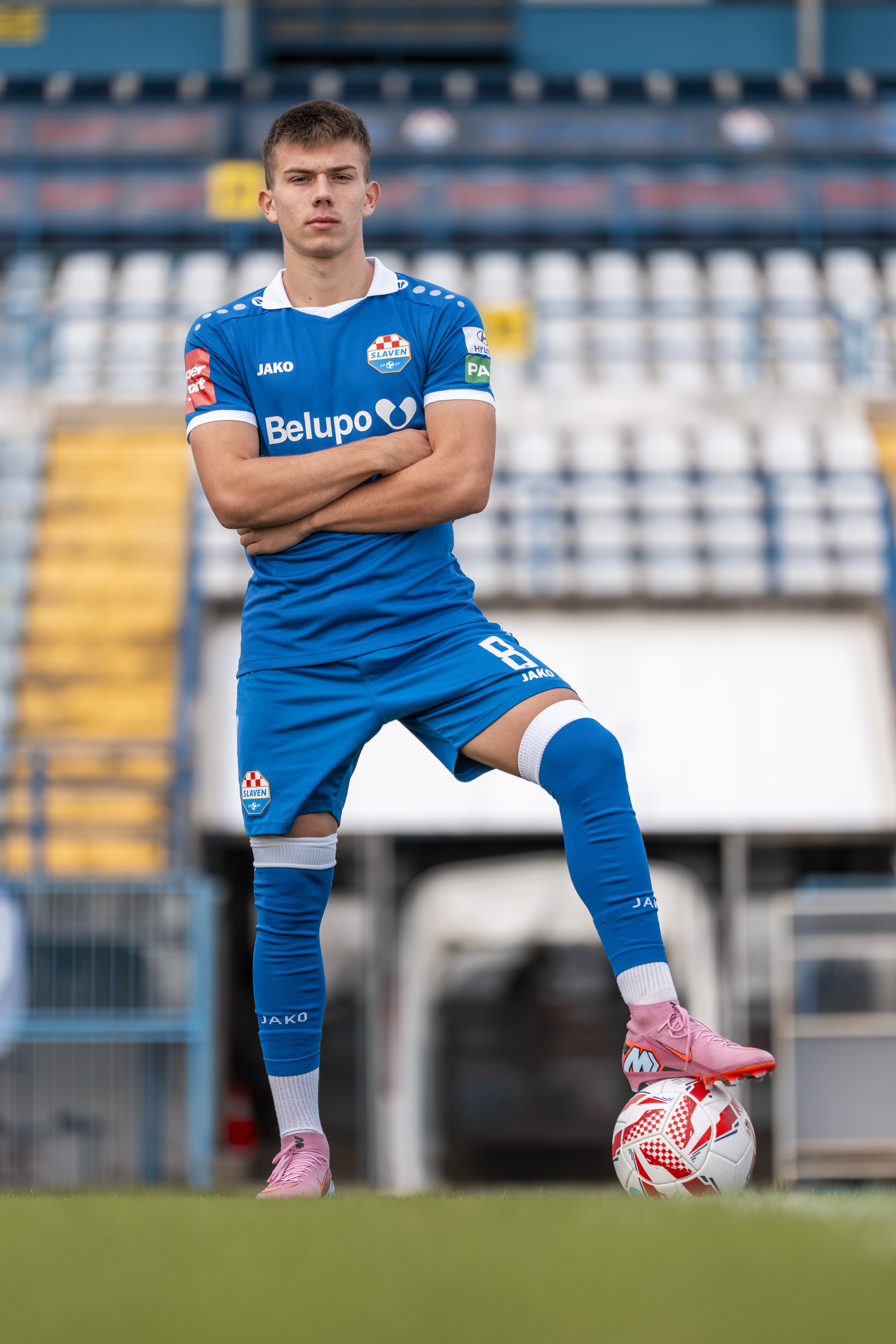
- Jagusić with Slaven Belupo in 2025

Personal information
- Date of birth: 6 September 2005 (age 21)
- Place of birth: Koprivnica, Croatia
- Height: 1.78 m (5 ft 10 in)
- Position: Attacking midfielder

Team information
- Current team: Panathinaikos
- Number: 8

Youth career
- –2012: Slaven Belupo
- 2012–2013: Koprivnica
- 2013–2014: Slaven Belupo
- 2014–2021: Dinamo Zagreb
- 2021–2023: Slaven Belupo

Senior career*
Years	Team	Apps	(Gls)
2023–2026	Slaven Belupo	59	(11)
2026–	Panathinaikos	7	(0)

International career^{‡}
2025–	Croatia U21	15	(5)
- * Club domestic league appearances and goals as of 14 November 2026 ‡ National team caps and goals as of 14 November 2026

Adriano Jagušić (born 6 September 2005) is a Croatian professional footballer who plays as an attacking midfielder for Super League Greece club Panathinaikos.

== Club career ==
Jagušić played in Dinamo Zagreb youth ranks before moving back to his homeclub in Koprivnica, Slaven Belupo. On 13 August 2023, Jagušić made his debut against Hajduk Split.

On 6 February 2026, Jagušić was signed on a 4.5-year contract by Panathinaikos. The total fee paid to Slaven Belupo was €5,200,000 for the completed transfer, but the club will also receive an additional 20% from the sell-on clause.

== Career statistics ==
=== Club ===
As of 5 August 2026

Appearances and goals by club, season and competition
Club	Season	League			National cup (Note: Includes Croatian Cup and Greek Cup)		Continental		Other		Total	
Club	Season	Division	Apps	Goals	Apps	Goals	Apps	Goals	Apps	Goals	Apps	Goals
Slaven Belupo	2023–24	HNL	12	1	0	0	—		—		12	1
Slaven Belupo	2024–25	HNL	27	3	6	3	—		—		33	6
Slaven Belupo	2025–26	HNL	20	7	2	2	—		—		22	9
Slaven Belupo	Total		59	11	8	5	0	0	0	0	67	16
Panathinaikos	2025–26	Super League Greece	5	0	1	0	0	0	—		6	0
Panathinaikos	2026–27	Super League Greece	0	0	0	0	3 (Note: UEFA Conference League)	2	—		3	2
Panathinaikos	Total		5	0	1	0	3	2	0	0	9	2
Career total			64	11	9	5	3	2	0	0	76	18
