= Moussa Sissoko =

French footballer (born 1989)

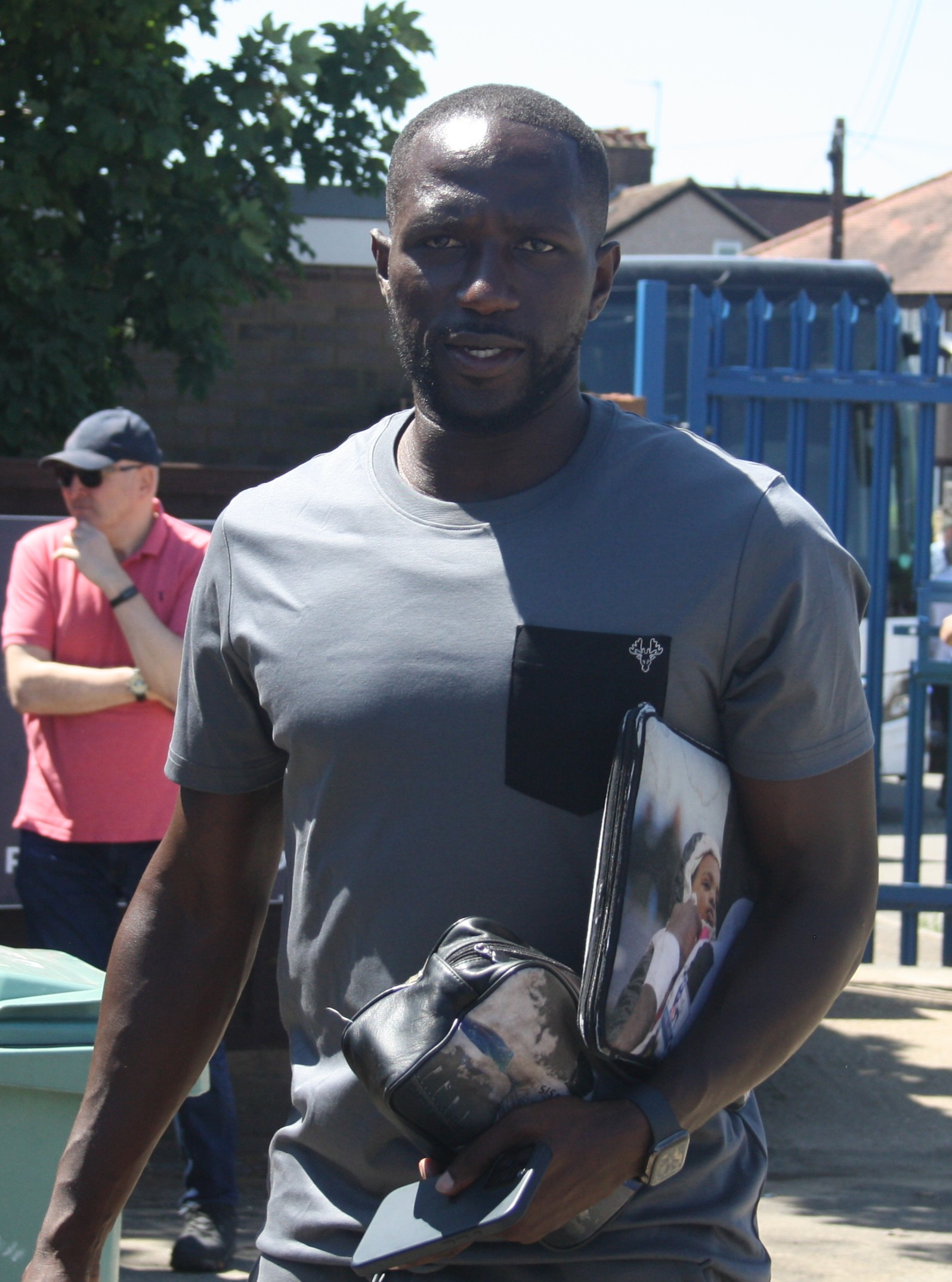
- Sissoko with Watford in 2025

Personal information
- Full name: Moussa Sissoko
- Date of birth: 16 August 1989 (age 37)
- Place of birth: Le Blanc-Mesnil, Seine-Saint-Denis, France
- Height: 1.87 m (6 ft 2 in)
- Position: Midfielder

Team information
- Current team: Panathinaikos
- Number: 32

Youth career
- 1995–1999: Espérance Aulnay
- 1999–2001: Red Star
- 2001–2003: Espérance Aulnay
- 2003–2007: Toulouse

Senior career*
Years	Team	Apps	(Gls)
2007–2013	Toulouse	192	(20)
2013–2016	Newcastle United	118	(11)
2016–2021	Tottenham Hotspur	141	(3)
2021–2022	Watford	36	(2)
2022–2024	Nantes	56	(2)
2024–2026	Watford	60	(6)
2026–	Panathinaikos	4	(0)

International career
2005	France U16	2	(0)
2005–2006	France U17	9	(2)
2006–2007	France U18	8	(0)
2007–2008	France U19	7	(0)
2008–2011	France U21	20	(1)
2009–2021	France	71	(2)
Medal record
Men's football
Representing France
UEFA European Championship
Runner-up	2016 France
- * Club domestic league appearances and goals as of 16 March 2026

Moussa Sissoko (born 16 August 1989) is a French professional footballer who plays as a midfielder for Greek Super League club Panathinaikos. He is a box-to-box midfielder in the centre of the pitch, and is capable of playing as a defensive midfielder, or even as an attacking midfielder, right winger or right-back.

Sissoko began his football career playing for local youth clubs in the Île-de-France region, such as Espérance Aulnay and Red Star. In 2002, he moved south to join professional club Toulouse. Sissoko spent four years in the club's youth academy and made his professional debut in the 2007–08 season, as well as making his UEFA Champions League debut. In the following season, Sissoko earned award nominations for his performances and also helped Toulouse qualify for the newly created UEFA Europa League. He eventually joined Newcastle United in the Premier League in 2013, before moving on to Tottenham Hotspur in 2016 following Newcastle's relegation from the top flight. At Tottenham, Sissoko finished runner-up in the 2016–17 Premier League and started the 2019 UEFA Champions League final. After departing Tottenham in 2021, he spent a season at Watford before joining Nantes in 2022.

Sissoko was a French youth international and played at all levels he was eligible for. In August 2009, he was called up to the senior team for the first time and made his senior international debut in a 2010 FIFA World Cup qualification against the Faroe Islands. He made his first international start four days later in a qualifier against Austria. Sissoko was a member of the France side that finished runners-up at UEFA Euro 2016. He was also included in their squad for UEFA Euro 2020.

== Early life and career ==
Moussa Sissoko was born on 16 August 1989 in Le Blanc-Mesnil, a commune in the northeastern suburbs of Paris in the Seine-Saint-Denis department of France, to Malian parents. His father is a construction worker and his mother is a housewife. Sissoko is the eldest of four children, with three younger sisters. He was attracted to football at a very young age, stating, "I quickly realised that football could lead me to have a better life". At the age of six, Sissoko joined the youth academy of Espérance Aulnay, based in nearby Aulnay-sous-Bois, a suburb in northeastern Paris. He trained three times a week at the club under the supervision of trainer Adama Dieye, who now serves as a correspondent for the club's futsal team. Sissoko describes Dieye as an important mentor in his development stating "I am here today because of him".

In July 1999, Sissoko moved to Saint-Ouen to join Red Star. Sissoko spent two years at the club and was teammates with former France youth international Yannis Salibur. In September 2001, he returned to Aulnay for a further two years developing before seeking a move to a professional club.

== Club career ==
=== Toulouse ===
==== 2003–2008 ====
In July 2003, Sissoko made the trek down south to the Haute-Garonne department to sign with professional club Toulouse. He signed an aspirant (youth) contract and was placed in the club's under-14 team. Sissoko spent three years developing in the club's youth academy alongside future teammates Cheikh M'Bengue and Étienne Capoue before earning a call up to the club's reserve team in the Championnat de France amateur, the fourth level of French football, ahead of the 2006–07 season. Sissoko appeared in 18 matches during the amateur season, quickly becoming one of the club's most sought after prospects. Prior to signing his professional contract with Toulouse, he garnered interest from English clubs Liverpool and Bolton Wanderers.

Midway through the 2006–07 season, Sissoko signed his first professional contract agreeing to a three-year deal with Toulouse until June 2010. He was subsequently promoted to the club's senior team in the ensuing summer and assigned the number 22 shirt by manager Elie Baup. Sissoko made his professional debut on 4 August 2007, appearing as a substitute in a 3–1 defeat to Valenciennes. He made his first professional start the following week in the club's 1–0 upset victory over the defending champions Lyon. On 15 August, he appeared in the club's UEFA Champions League third qualifying round first leg match against Liverpool. Sissoko replaced Albin Ebondo in the 83rd minute and received a yellow card in the final minute. Toulouse lost the first leg 1–0 and the tie 5–0 on aggregate. Sissoko scored his first professional goal on 1 September 2007 in a 2–0 victory over Auxerre, scoring in injury time after coming on as a substitute two minutes previously. In late September, he began featuring in the team as a regular starter playing in the defensive midfielder role alongside attackers Achille Emana and Fodé Mansaré, and captain Nicolas Dieuze. On 6 January 2008, Sissoko scored his second goal of the season against Paris in the Coupe de France. Toulouse surprisingly lost the match to the semi-professional club 2–1. Despite the promising individual season from Sissoko, Toulouse finished one place above relegation and Baup was sacked and replaced by Alain Casanova. Following the season, on 25 July 2008, Sissoko signed a contract extension with the club until 2012.

==== 2008–2013 ====
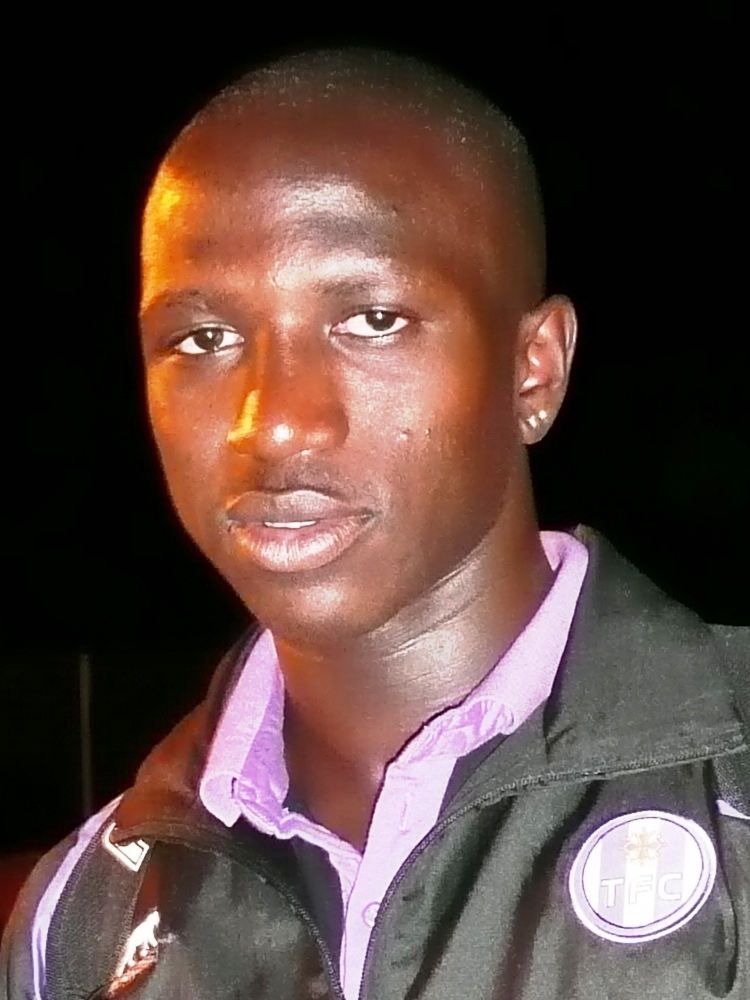
Sissoko in Toulouse colours, 2008

Following the departure of Emana to Spain, Casanova put Sissoko into the box-to-box midfielder role ahead of the 2008–09 season to accommodate emerging defensive midfielder Étienne Capoue into the starting lineup, as well as Étienne Didot, who arrived from Rennes. The move allowed Sissoko to retain his defensive duties, but also showcase his attacking skills. He began the season featuring primarily as a substitute under Casanova, but by December, Sissoko had become a regular in the starting eleven. On 24 January 2009, he scored his first goal of the season against amateur Alsatian club Schirrhein in an 8–0 thrashing in the Coupe de France. It was a memorable goal with Sissoko running nearly the entire pitch with the ball at his feet, eluding several Schirrhein players, before finishing at the six-yard box. Toulouse reached the semi-finals of the competition before losing 2–1 to the eventual winners Guingamp. In the league, Sissoko was a key contributor in helping a refurbished Toulouse side finish 4th in the league, leading to qualification for the newly created UEFA Europa League. He scored his first goal of the league campaign on 7 February in a 2–0 victory over Le Mans. Sissoko also scored goals in victories over Derby de la Garonne rivals Bordeaux and Paris Saint-Germain. In total, he made 40 appearances and scored five goals. For his efforts, he was nominated for the UNFP Young Player of the Year, along with teammate Capoue who also had an outstanding season.

Prior to the start of the 2009–10 season, Sissoko drew strong interest from Premier League outfit Tottenham Hotspur. The English club reportedly offered as much as £12 million for the player and subsequently increased its offer to £15.5 million before president Olivier Sadran declared that Sissoko would not be sold. Despite Sadran's comments, fellow Premier League club Manchester City, as well as Italian clubs Internazionale and Juventus, and German club Bayern Munich were also linked with Sissoko. To quash the rumours, Sadran announced that Sissoko would not leave the club for anything less than €30 million.

Sissoko started the 2009–10 campaign by displaying his attacking prowess as he scored six league goals in the club's first 12 matches. He opened the campaign scoring in the club's second league match of the season against Saint-Étienne in a 3–1 victory. On 20 September 2009, he scored in the club's 2–0 win against Le Mans and in the following week scored the opening goal in the club's 2–1 loss to Lyon. On 1 October 2009, Sissoko scored his first career European goal in a UEFA Europa League group stage match against Belgian club Club Brugge. The match ended in a 2–2 draw. On 24 October, Sissoko recorded his fourth league goal of the season in a 2–0 away victory over Lens. In the ensuing two weeks, Sissoko scored both openers in a 1–1 draw with Marseille and a 3–2 victory at home against Rennes. Sissoko's goalscoring slowed in the latter part of the season, scoring only one goal after the winter break against Valenciennes in a 3–1 win. He was a regular in the team for the rest of the season, but Toulouse failed to keep pace with the league leaders and finished a disappointing 14th.

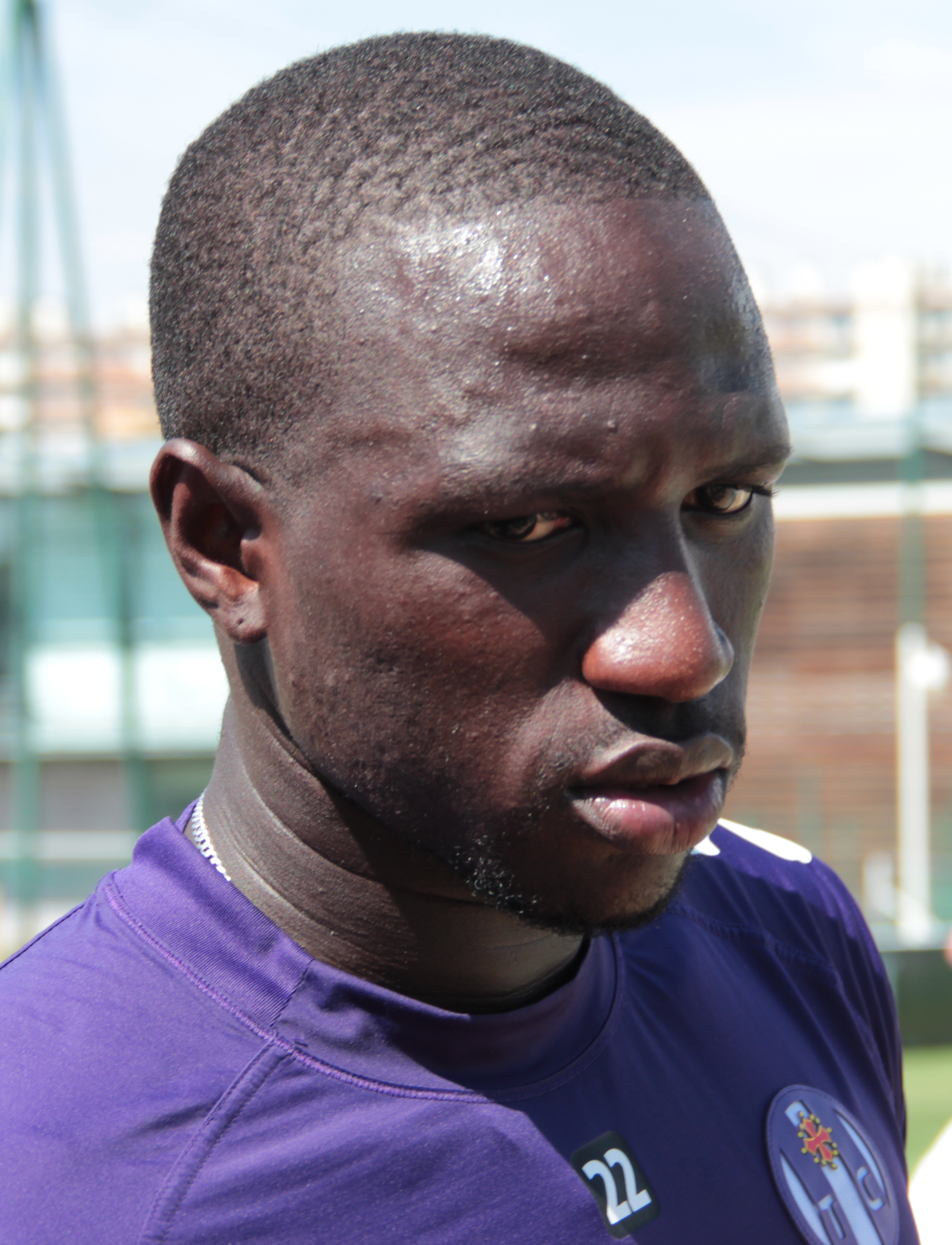
Sissoko with Toulouse in 2012.

Despite interest from several clubs, Sissoko opted to remain at Toulouse stating he was happy to remain at the club and would let his agent deal with his transfer situation. He scored his first goal of the new season on 22 September 2010 in a 2–1 defeat to Boulogne-sur-Mer in the Coupe de la Ligue. On 6 February 2011, Sissoko scored both team goals in a 2–0 win over Monaco.

=== Newcastle United ===
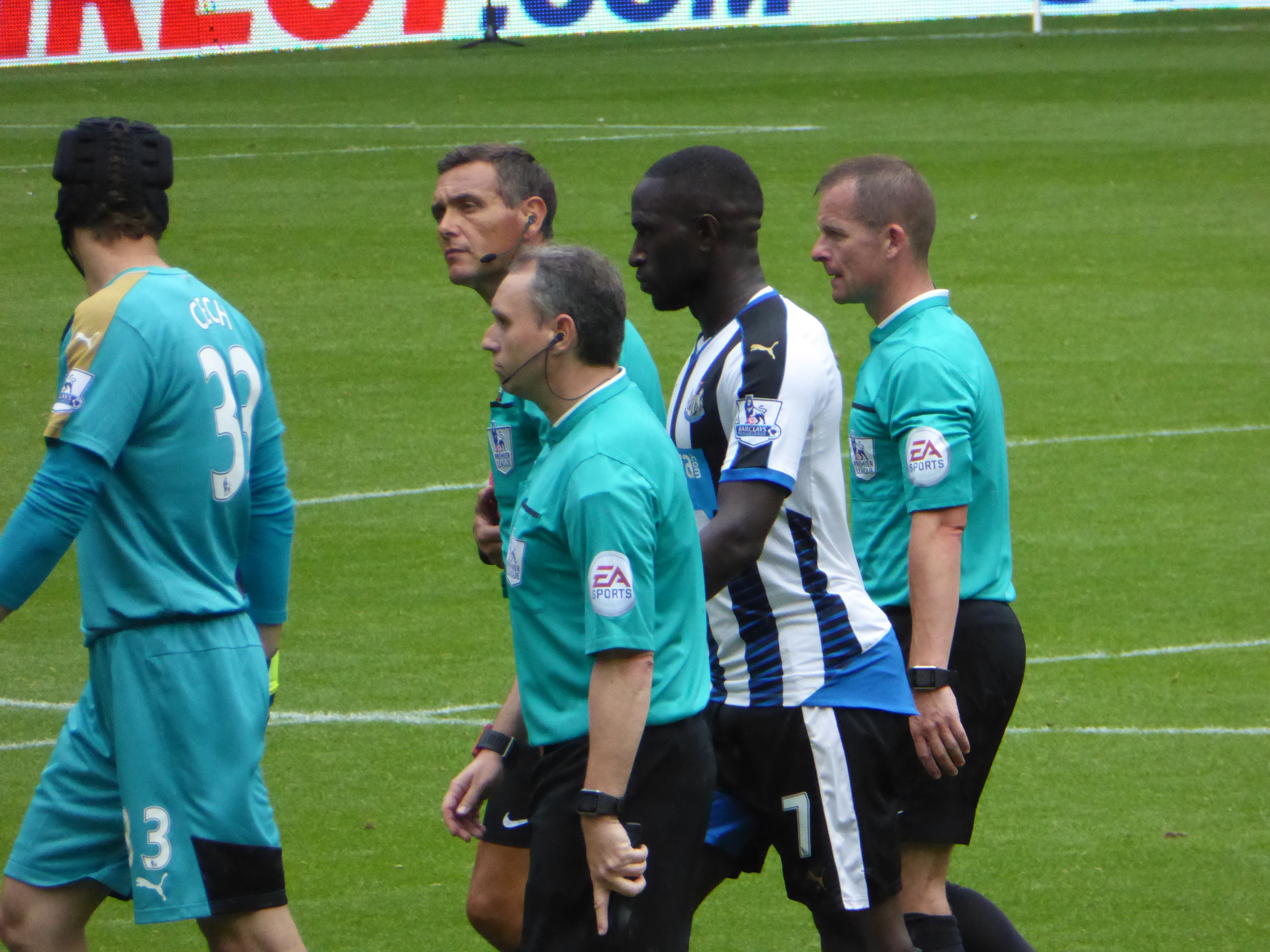
Sissoko playing for Newcastle United against Arsenal in 2015

On 21 January 2013, English side Newcastle United confirmed they had signed Sissoko on a six-and-a-half-year deal for an undisclosed fee, believed to be in the region of £1.5 million. It was rumoured that Sissoko waived any signing on fee from his new club in order to push the move through after Toulouse were unwilling to let him leave until the summer, when his contract expired. He was given the number 7 shirt.

He made his debut for Newcastle on 28 January, getting the assist for the opening goal in a 2–1 win against Aston Villa. In his second match, his first at St James' Park, Sissoko scored both the equalising and winning goals in a 3–2 comeback victory against Chelsea. On 24 February, Sissoko scored in a 4–2 win against Southampton.

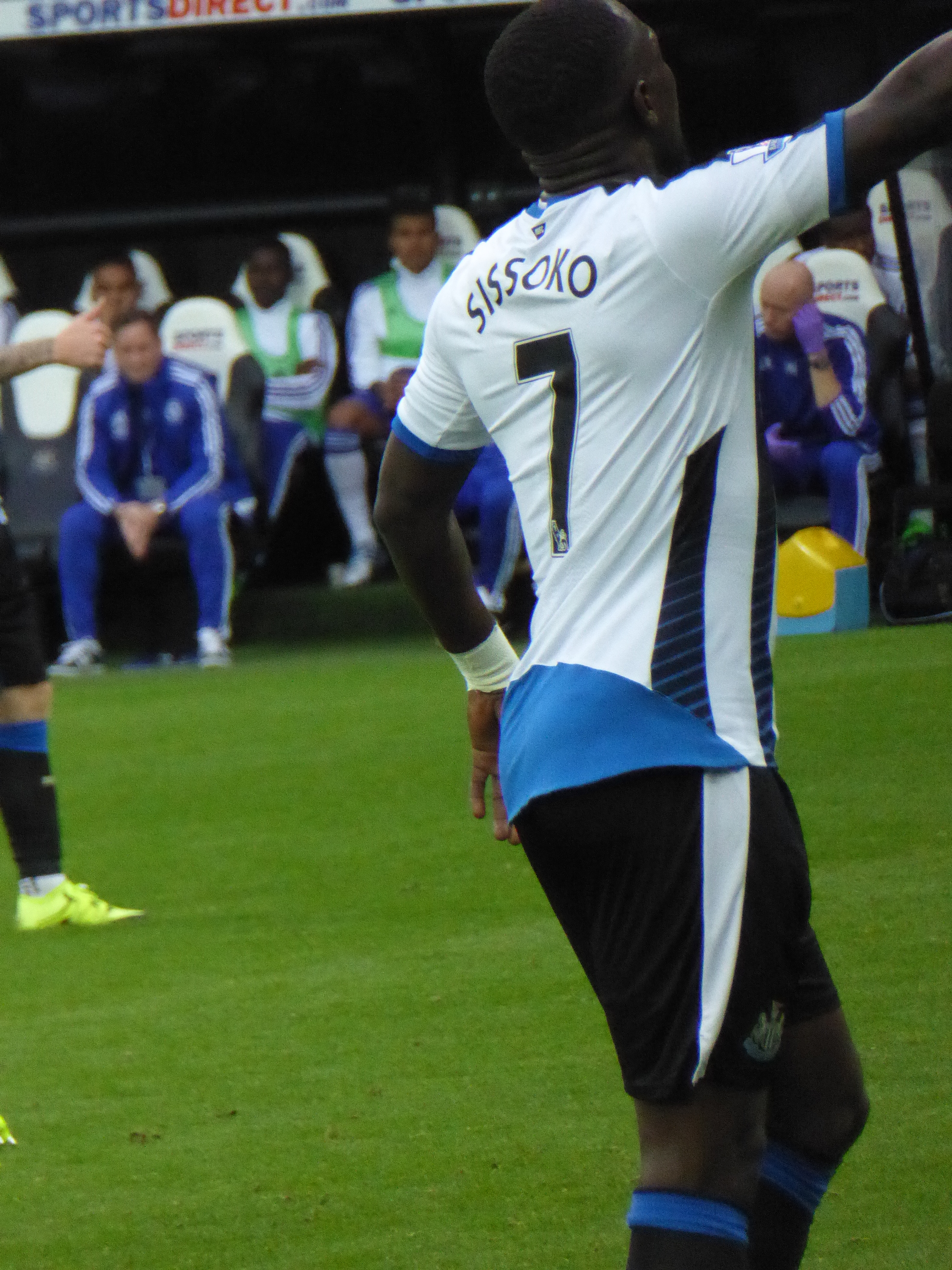
Sissoko faces Chelsea at St James' Park, 2015.

Sissoko's first goal of the 2013–14 season came on 30 November, against West Bromwich Albion, a 25-yard strike which made the score 2–1. In the closing minutes of a game against Southampton in December, he was involved in an incident in which he accidentally hit referee Mike Jones in the face when trying to pull away from the opposing goalkeeper. He scored twice in a 4–1 win away at Hull City in March 2014, in what the Chronicle reporter, Neil Cameron, described as an "utterly superb" performance.

In the 2014–15 season, Sissoko was given the captain's armband after Fabricio Coloccini sustained an injury. In his first match starting as captain, Sissoko scored his first league goal of the season in a 1–0 win over Queens Park Rangers. On 29 November 2014, Sissoko was shown two yellows in the space of 45 seconds, in a 1–0 away defeat to West Ham United. On 1 January 2015, Sissoko scored his second league goal of the season, as Newcastle drew 3–3 against Burnley. On 13 April 2015, Sissoko was sent off in an away match at Liverpool, receiving a second yellow card from referee Lee Mason, after a dangerous tackle to Lucas Leiva. On 24 May 2015, the final day of the season, he scored the opening goal in a 2–0 home victory over West Ham United, which helped Newcastle clinch their Premier League safety.

During the 2015–16 season, Sissoko was made captain for the final six games of the season, and in his first game as captain on 16 April 2016, he scored his one and only goal of the campaign in a 3–0 home victory against Swansea City. This sparked a six-game unbeaten run in Newcastle's relegation battle, which included creditable draws against Liverpool and Manchester City, and a final day 5–1 win over Tottenham Hotspur. Despite this, Newcastle were unable to escape the drop zone and were relegated to the Championship.

=== Tottenham Hotspur ===
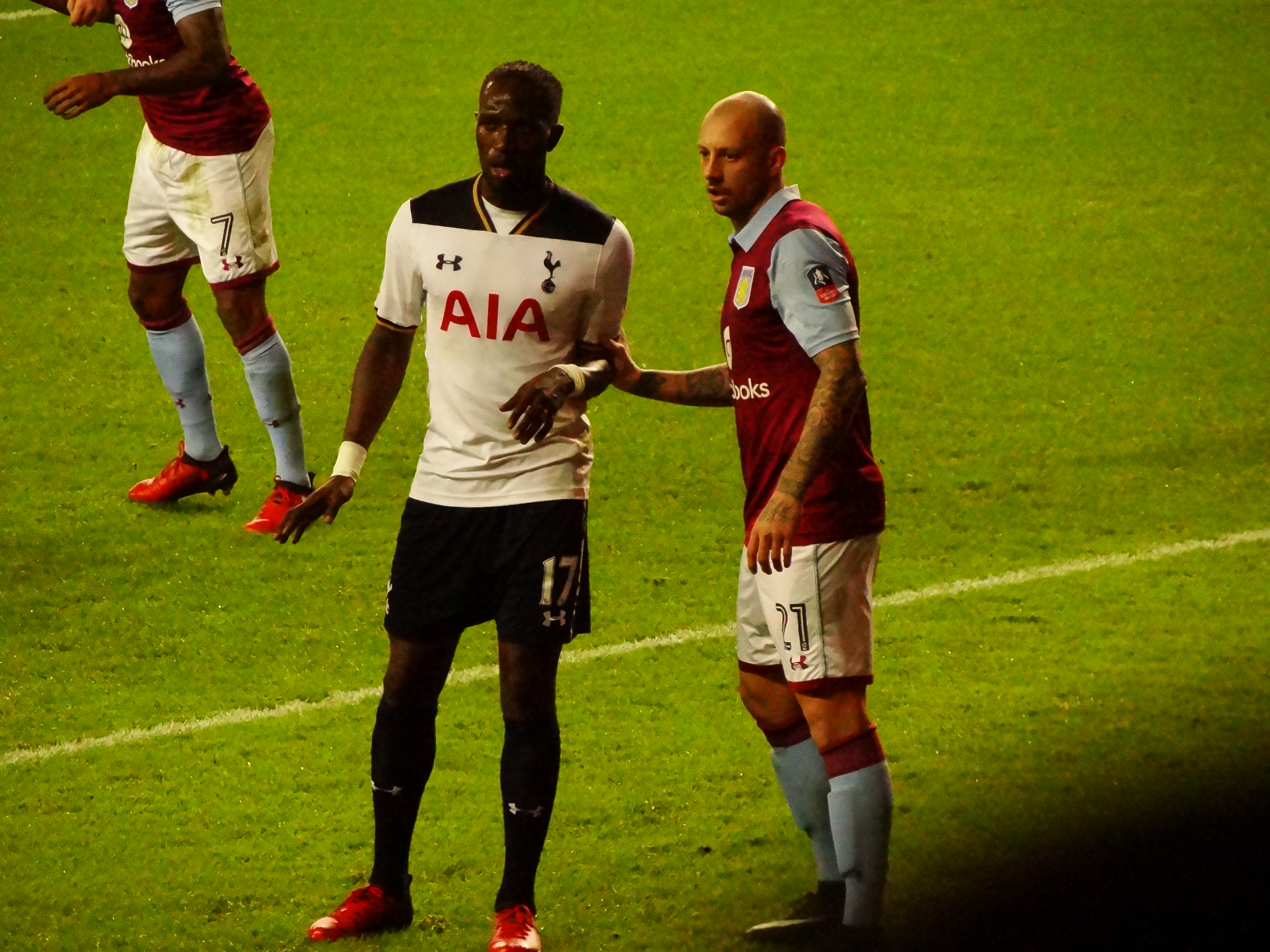
Sissoko plays for Tottenham Hotspur in an FA Cup clash against Aston Villa, 2017.

On 31 August 2016, Sissoko signed for Tottenham Hotspur on a five-year deal, for £30 million. Tottenham, who beat out Everton for his signature on the final day of the transfer window, gave Sissoko his debut away at Stoke City on 10 September 2016. On 22 October, in a match against AFC Bournemouth, Sissoko elbowed Harry Arter, resulting in a three-match ban. He did not play a league match again for Spurs until 3 December, and made just four more starts in the Premier League that season under manager Mauricio Pochettino. Following a disappointing first season at Tottenham, Sissoko was afforded an extended run in the first team to open the 2017–18 season after multiple injuries in the midfield. He received his fourth start in six Premier League games in a 3–2 win at West Ham on 23 September, with Pochettino describing his performance as "fantastic", and scored his first goal for Tottenham on 30 September 2017 in their 4–0 victory over Huddersfield Town. In the 2018–19 season, Sissoko emerged as a crucial member of Tottenham's squad, making 43 appearances in all competitions. He won the inaugural Tottenham Hotspur Legends' Player of the Season award in May 2019.

In the final of the 2018–19 UEFA Champions League against Liverpool, Sissoko's inexplicably raised arm blocked a cross from Liverpool's Sadio Mane. Judged a handball, it resulted in a penalty converted by Mohamed Salah and Tottenham eventually lost the match 2–0. In the 2019–20 season, under new manager José Mourinho, Sissoko scored his first goal in over two years in a game against Bournemouth. It was only his second Premier League goal for Tottenham and helped the team to a 3–2 win.

In the 2020 New Year's Day match against Southampton, Sissoko damaged the medial collateral ligament of his right knee, which required surgery resulting in him being out of action for more than three months. However, due to the COVID-19 pandemic which resulted in the suspension of league matches, he did not play any game until the 19 June match against Manchester United after the season restarted. On 5 January 2021, Sissoko scored his first goal of the 2020–21 season in the semi-final of the Carabao Cup, which ended in a 2–0 home win over Brentford.

=== Watford ===
On 27 August 2021, Sissoko joined Watford on a two-year contract. He made his debut two days later in a 1–0 away defeat against his former club Tottenham Hotspur. It was to be an ill-fated move with Sissoko's Watford side suffering relegation that season.

=== Nantes ===
On 1 July 2022, Sissoko returned to France and signed with Nantes.

=== Return to Watford ===
On 10 July 2024, Sissoko returned to England, rejoining Championship side Watford on a two-year deal.

=== Panathinaikos ===
On 2 February 2026, Sissoko signed with Panathinaikos on a one and half year contract.

== International career ==
=== Youth ===
Sissoko has been active with France at youth level having represented France at all levels for which he was eligible. On 4 January 2005, he made his youth international debut at under-16 level in a friendly match against Turkey in Manisa. France won the match 3–0. Sissoko's only other appearance with the team came in the return leg against Turkey that was played in İzmir two days later.

With the under-17 team, Sissoko's playing time increased as France attempted to qualify for the 2006 UEFA European Under-17 Football Championship. He made his debut as a substitute on 2 November 2005 in the team's opening competitive match against England. On 26 February 2006, Sissoko scored his first youth international goal in the team's second group stage match of the Algarve Cup against the Netherlands. In the team's next group stage match against Portugal, Sissoko scored again in a 3–1 victory. In UEFA competition, Sissoko and the team, composed of players such as David Ngog, Gabriel Obertan, Adel Tarabt, and Grégory Sertic, failed to qualify for the 2006 UEFA European Under-17 Football Championship, due to their second-place finish in the Elite Round portion of the competition. With the under-18 team, Sissoko appeared in all eight matches the team contested as France nearly went undefeated losing their only match 1–0 to Germany in Kehl.

Due to his increased playing time domestically with Toulouse, Sissoko missed the 2007 edition of the Sendai Cup in Japan and numerous other under-19 tournaments and only featured in 2008 UEFA U-19 Championship qualification matches. He made his debut on 28 October 2007 in a 5–0 rout of Luxembourg in the first qualifying round. Similar to the competition at under-17 level, France were later eliminated in the Elite Round portion of the competition. Sissoko earned his first call up to the under-21 team for their friendly match against Bosnia and Herzegovina on 9 September 2008. He subsequently made his debut in the match, which France won 1–0. Sissoko scored his only goal with the team on 31 March 2009 in the team's 2–0 win over England at the City Ground in Nottingham. He featured with the team frequently as they were attempting to qualify for the 2011 UEFA European Under-21 Football Championship. The team's ultimate failure to qualify for the competition effectively ended Sissoko's under-21 career, though he still appeared in friendly matches against Turkey, Denmark, and Russia in 2010 as he was still eligible to participate in non-competitive matches.

=== Senior ===
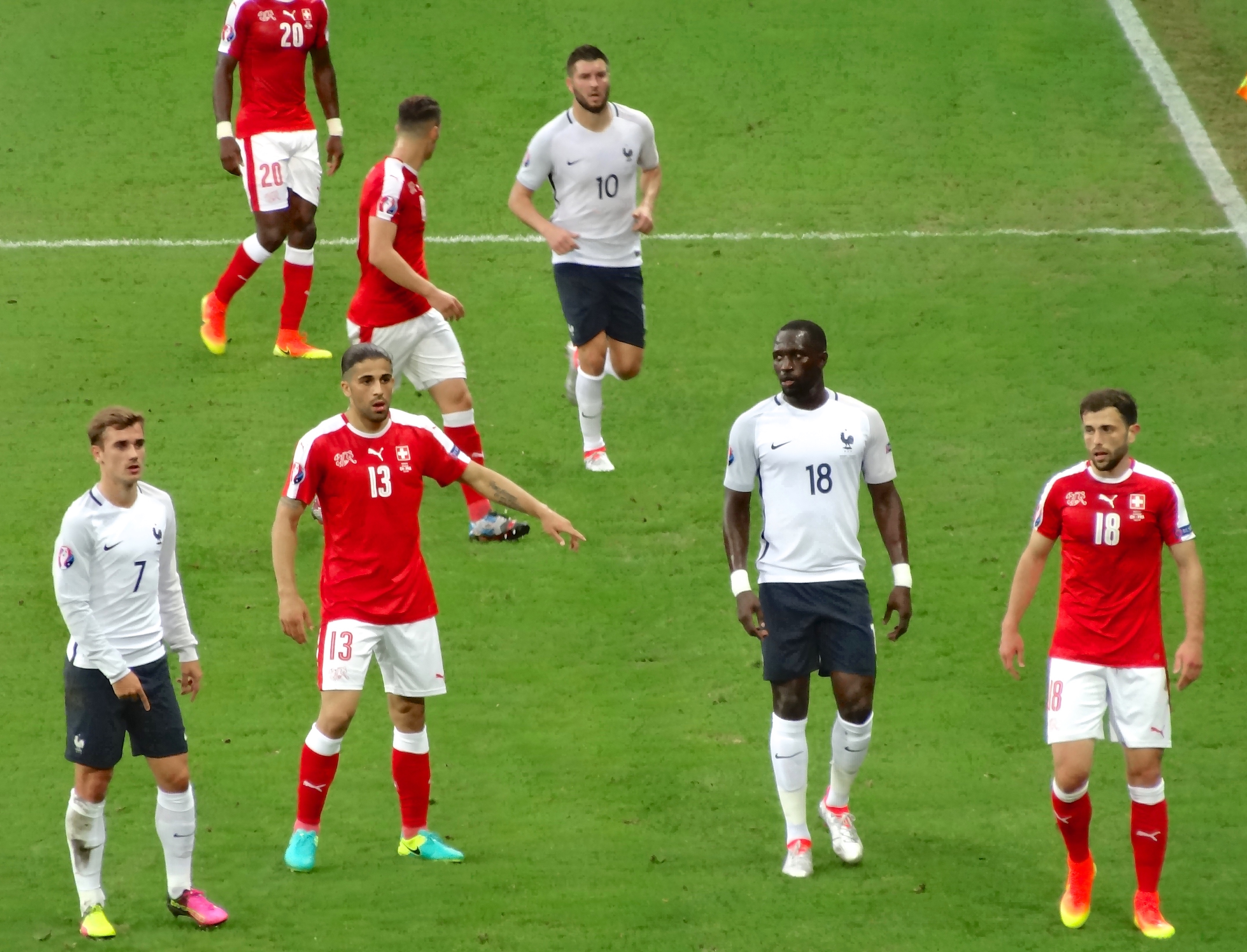
Sissoko (wearing white; No.18) playing for France against Switzerland at UEFA EURO 2016; France would finish the tournament as runners-up.

On 3 August 2009, Sissoko earned his first call up to the senior team for a 2010 FIFA World Cup qualification match against the Faroe Islands. Sissoko did not make his debut in the match. On 6 October, he was named to the senior squad for the second time for the team's final World Cup qualification matches against the Faroe Islands and Austria. Sissoko earned his first cap in the match against the Faroe Islands appearing as a substitute for Jérémy Toulalan in the second half. France won the match 5–0.

With France's spot in the play-offs already secured, Sissoko made his first career start in the match against Austria, which France won 3–1. Despite appearing regularly in the squad under Raymond Domenech in the 2009–10 season, Sissoko failed to make the squad for the 2010 FIFA World Cup.

On 13 May 2014, Sissoko was named in Didier Deschamps' squad for the 2014 FIFA World Cup. He made his FIFA World Cup debut in 2014, coming on as a substitute in France's 3–0 group win over Honduras. In France's second match of the tournament, a 5–2 victory over Switzerland, he was named in the starting line-up and scored his first international goal.

Sissoko was involved in France's run to the final of the 2016 UEFA European Championship, making four starts in the tournament. He put in an inspired performance in the final against Portugal, having two shots saved in the 1–0 extra time defeat.

On 17 May 2018, he was named on the standby list for the 23-man French squad for the 2018 FIFA World Cup in Russia. Due to his poor club form, he was not part of the French squad that won the World Cup. However, with a good club performance in the 2018–19 season, he was again back in the national squad, and played a role in the Euro 2020 qualifiers for France.

== Style of play ==
A versatile midfielder, Sissoko is capable of playing in any midfield role, as well as in several other positions across the pitch. He usually plays as a box-to-box midfielder in the centre, although he is also capable of playing in a holding midfield role, or even as an attacking midfielder or right winger, due to his pace and offensive capabilities. He has also played on the left flank, as a second striker, or as an attacking full-back or wing-back on occasion.

A large, fast, physically powerful, hard-working, and energetic player, with an ability to run long distances and cover a lot of ground, Sissoko has been described as a "well-rounded central midfielder" who is "tall, rangy, and strong in the tackle". Although his consistency, passing, and technical ability have been questioned at times in the media, he possesses a solid first touch, and has demonstrated significant improvements in terms of his technique and link-up play as his career has progressed; furthermore, he is known for his direct style of play, as well as his ability to transition from defence to attack, charge forward with the ball, and run at defences on counter-attacks, courtesy of his ball-winning ability and positional sense, as well as his speed, dynamism, athleticism, and strength. He is also known for his striking ability from distance and on the run with his right foot, as well as his eye for goal from midfield. Regarded as a promising prospect in his youth, in 2010 he was included in Don Balón's list of the 100 best young players in the world born after 1989.

== Personal life ==
Sissoko is Hindu . Alongside his native French, he speaks English.

== Career statistics ==
=== Club ===
As of match played 25 October 2026

Appearances and goals by club, season and competition
Club	Season	League			National cup (Note: Includes Coupe de France, FA Cup)		League cup (Note: Includes Coupe de la Ligue, Football League/EFL Cup)		Europe		Other		Total	
Club	Season	Division	Apps	Goals	Apps	Goals	Apps	Goals	Apps	Goals	Apps	Goals	Apps	Goals
Toulouse	2007–08	Ligue 1	30	1	1	1	1	0	2 (Note: Appearances in UEFA Champions League)	0	—		34	2
Toulouse	2008–09	Ligue 1	35	4	4	1	1	0	—		—		40	5
Toulouse	2009–10	Ligue 1	37	7	1	0	2	0	7 (Note: Appearances in UEFA Europa League)	1	—		47	8
Toulouse	2010–11	Ligue 1	36	5	1	0	1	1	—		—		38	6
Toulouse	2011–12	Ligue 1	35	2	1	0	1	0	—		—		37	2
Toulouse	2012–13	Ligue 1	19	1	1	0	2	0	—		—		22	1
Toulouse	Total		192	20	9	2	8	1	9	1	—		218	24
Newcastle United	2012–13	Premier League	12	3	0	0	0	0	6	0	—		18	3
Newcastle United	2013–14	Premier League	35	3	1	0	2	0	—		—		38	3
Newcastle United	2014–15	Premier League	34	4	0	0	4	1	—		—		38	5
Newcastle United	2015–16	Premier League	37	1	1	0	1	0	—		—		39	1
Newcastle United	Total		118	11	2	0	7	1	6	0	—		133	12
Tottenham Hotspur	2016–17	Premier League	25	0	4	0	0	0	5 (Note: Four appearances in UEFA Champions League, one appearance in UEFA Europa League)	0	—		34	0
Tottenham Hotspur	2017–18	Premier League	33	1	6	0	2	1	6	0	—		47	2
Tottenham Hotspur	2018–19	Premier League	29	0	0	0	5	0	10	0	—		44	0
Tottenham Hotspur	2019–20	Premier League	29	2	0	0	0	0	6	0	—		35	2
Tottenham Hotspur	2020–21	Premier League	25	0	3	0	4	1	10	0	—		42	1
Tottenham Hotspur	Total		141	3	13	0	11	2	37	0	—		202	5
Watford	2021–22	Premier League	36	2	1	0	1	0	—		—		38	2
Nantes	2022–23	Ligue 1	30	2	5	0	—		8	0	1 (Note: Appearance in Trophée des Champions)	0	44	2
Nantes	2023–24	Ligue 1	26	0	2	0	—		—		—		28	0
Nantes	Total		56	2	7	0	—		8	0	1	0	72	2
Watford	2024–25	Championship	40	6	0	0	0	0	—		—		40	6
Watford	2025–26	Championship	20	0	1	0	0	0	—		—		21	0
Watford	Total		60	6	1	0	0	0	—		—		61	6
Panathinaikos	2025–26	Super League Greece	4	0	0	0	—		0	0	—		4	0
Panathinaikos	2026–27	Super League Greece	0	0	0	0	—		0	0	—		0	0
Career total			607	44	33	2	27	4	60	1	1	0	728	51

=== International ===
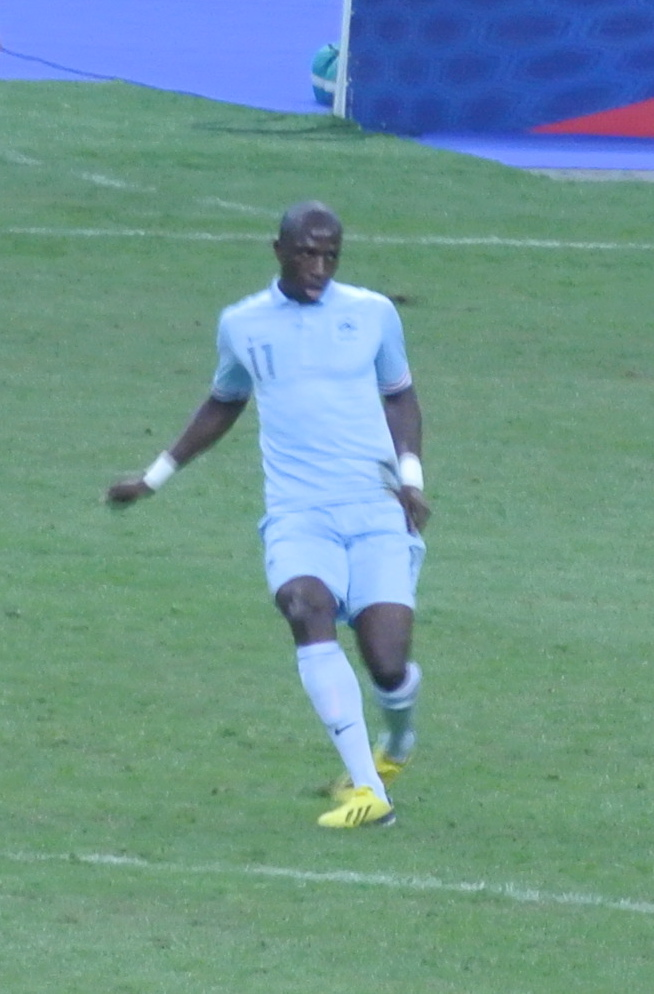
Sissoko playing for France in 2013

As of match played 28 June 2021

Appearances and goals by national team and year
National team	Year	Apps	Goals
France	2009	2	0
France	2010	1	0
France	2012	3	0
France	2013	7	0
France	2014	14	1
France	2015	7	0
France	2016	16	0
France	2017	3	1
France	2018	2	0
France	2019	7	0
France	2020	3	0
France	2021	6	0
Total		71	2

Scores and results list France's goal tally first, score column indicates score after each Sissoko goal.

List of international goals scored by Moussa Sissoko
No.	Date	Venue	Opponent	Score	Result	Competition
1	20 June 2014	Itaipava Arena Fonte Nova, Salvador, Brazil	Switzerland	5–0	5–2	2014 FIFA World Cup
2	2 June 2017	Roazhon Park, Rennes, France	Paraguay	4–0	5–0	Friendly

== Honours ==
Tottenham Hotspur

- EFL Cup runner-up: 2020–21
- UEFA Champions League runner-up: 2018–19

Nantes

- Coupe de France runner-up: 2022–23

France

- UEFA European Championship runner-up: 2016

Individual

- UEFA Champions League Squad of the Season: 2018–19
- Tottenham Hotspur Legends' Player of the Season: 2019
