= Triantafyllos Tsapras =

Greek footballer (born 2001)

Personal information
- Date of birth: 22 October 2001 (age 25)
- Place of birth: Livadia, Greece
- Height: 1.86 m (6 ft 1 in)
- Position: Right-back

Team information
- Current team: Panathinaikos
- Number: 19

Youth career
- 2016–2017: AEK Athens
- 2017–2019: Levadiakos

Senior career*
Years	Team	Apps	(Gls)
2019–2026	Levadiakos	148	(12)
2026–	Panathinaikos	4	(0)
- * Club domestic league appearances and goals as of 14 November 2026

Triantafyllos Tsapras (Greek: Τριαντάφυλλος Τσάπρας; born 22 October 2001) is a Greek professional footballer who plays as a right-back for Super League club Panathinaikos.

== Career ==
=== Levadiakos ===
Tsapras comes from the youth ranks of Levadiakos.

=== Panathinaikos ===
Tsapras was signed by Panathinaikos on 22 June 2026 on a four-year deal.

== Career statistics ==
As of match played 8 November 2026

Club	Season	League			Greek Cup		Europe		Total	
Club	Season	Division	Apps	Goals	Apps	Goals	Apps	Goals	Apps	Goals
Levadiakos	2019–20	Super League Greece 2	3	0	1	0	—		3	0
Levadiakos	2020–21	Super League Greece 2	10	0	0	0	—		10	0
Levadiakos	2021–22	Super League Greece 2	21	1	5	1	—		26	2
Levadiakos	2022–23	Super League Greece	26	2	3	0	—		29	2
Levadiakos	2023–24	Super League Greece 2	27	5	5	0	—		32	5
Levadiakos	2024–25	Super League Greece	30	3	1	0	—		31	3
Levadiakos	2025–26	Super League Greece	31	1	5	0	—		36	1
Levadiakos	Total		148	12	19	1	0	0	167	13
Panathinaikos	2026–27	Super League Greece	3	0	2	0	5 (Note: Appearances in UEFA Conference League)	0	10	0
Career total			151	12	21	1	5	0	177	13

== Honours ==
Levadiakos

- Super League Greece 2: 2021–22, 2023–24
