= Sotiris Kontouris =

Greek footballer

Personal information
- Full name: Sotirios Kontouris
- Date of birth: 24 February 2005 (age 21)
- Place of birth: Agrinio, Greece
- Height: 1.83 m (6 ft 0 in)
- Position: Midfielder

Team information
- Current team: Panathinaikos
- Number: 18

Youth career
- 2018–2023: Panetolikos

Senior career*
Years	Team	Apps	(Gls)
2023–2026	Panetolikos	27	(1)
2026–	Panathinaikos	12	(1)

International career^{‡}
2023–2024	Greece U19	9	(0)
2024–	Greece U21	8	(0)
- * Club domestic league appearances and goals as of 14 November 2026 ‡ National team caps and goals as of 14 November 2026

Sotiris Kontouris (Greek: Σωτήρης Κοντούρης; born 24 February 2005) is a Greek professional footballer who plays as a midfielder for Super League club Panathinaikos.

== Career ==
Born in Agrinio, Kontouris started his career at 13 years of age in his local team Panetolikos academy. In August 2023 he was promoted to the senior team where he quickly proved his worth and became an essential member of the team.

Being considered one of the most talented young players in Greece at the period, he quickly drew attention from the scouts of the big four of the Greek football (AEK, Panathinaikos, Olympiacos and PAOK) but the greens were quick to act, securing his transfer to Panathinaikos in December 2025 on a four-year contract until 2029, costing the sum of 1m euros.

== Career statistics ==
As of 16 September 2026

Club	Season	League			Cup		Continental		Other		Total	
Club	Season	Division	Apps	Goals	Apps	Goals	Apps	Goals	Apps	Goals	Apps	Goals
Panetolikos	2024–25	Super League Greece	17	0	1	0	—		—		18	0
Panetolikos	2025–26	Super League Greece	10	1	3	0	—		—		13	1
Panetolikos	Total		27	1	4	0	—		—		31	1
Panathinaikos	2025–26	Super League Greece	10	1	2	0	—		—		12	1
Panathinaikos	2026–27	Super League Greece	1	0	2	0	4 (Note: Appearances in UEFA Conference League)	0	—		7	0
Panathinaikos	Total		11	1	4	0	4	0	0	0	19	1
Career total			38	2	8	0	4	0	0	0	50	2
