= Giorgos Katris =

Greek footballer (born 2005)

Personal information
- Full name: Georgios Katris
- Date of birth: 14 October 2005 (age 21)
- Place of birth: Syros, Greece
- Height: 1.86 m (6 ft 1 in)
- Position: Defender

Team information
- Current team: Panathinaikos
- Number: 3

Youth career
- 2010–2015: AO Syros
- 2015–2021: Aias Syros
- 2021–2023: Panathinaikos

Senior career*
Years	Team	Apps	(Gls)
2024	Panathinaikos B	14	(0)
2024–	Panathinaikos	7	(0)
2024–2026	→ Levadiakos (loan)	24	(1)

International career^{‡}
2023–2024	Greece U19	8	(1)
2024–	Greece U21	6	(0)
- * Club domestic league appearances and goals as of 11 September 2026 ‡ National team caps and goals as of 26 September 2026

Giorgos Katris (Greek: Γιώργος Κάτρης; born 14 October 2005) is a Greek professional footballer, originating from Syros, who plays as a centre-back for Panathinaikos. He has represented the national team at the U19 and U21 levels.

== Club career ==
He joined the academies of Panathinaikos in 2021 and signed his first professional contract in 2023, which runs until 2026. In the same year, he also participated in the first team's pre-season preparation. During the 2023–24 season he played for Panathinaikos B with which he made 14 appearances. In August 2024 he was loaned to Levadiakos, where he remained until December 2025. In January 2026 his loan to Levadiakos was terminated and he returned to Panathinaikos. He made his debut for Panathinaikos on 29 January 2026 in a match against Roma in the Europa League.

On 16 March 2026, Panathinaikos, recognizing his immense potential, renewed his contract until June 2030, with the player declaring his excitement for his future in the club.

== Career statistics ==
As of 16 September 2026

Club	Season	League			National cup (Note: Includes Greek Cup)		Continental		Other		Total	
Club	Season	Division	Apps	Goals	Apps	Goals	Apps	Goals	Apps	Goals	Apps	Goals
Panathinaikos B	2023–24	Super League Greece 2	14	0	—		—		0	0	14	0
Levadiakos (loan)	2024–25	Super League Greece	19	1	1	0	—		0	0	20	1
Levadiakos (loan)	2025–26	Super League Greece	5	0	6	0	—		—		11	0
Levadiakos (loan)	Total		24	1	7	0	—		0	0	31	1
Panathinaikos	2025–26	Super League Greece	6	0	3	0	4 (Note: Appearances in UEFA Europa League)	0	—		13	0
Panathinaikos	2026–27	Super League Greece	1	0	2	0	4 (Note: Appearances in UEFA Conference League)	0	—		7	0
Panathinaikos	Total		7	0	5	0	8	0	0	0	20	0
Career total			45	1	12	0	8	0	0	0	65	1
