= Vicente Taborda =

Argentine footballer

Personal information
- Date of birth: 14 June 2001 (age 25)
- Place of birth: Gualeguay, Argentina
- Height: 1.75 m (5 ft 9 in)
- Position: Attacking midfielder

Team information
- Current team: Panathinaikos
- Number: 20

Youth career
- Centro Bancario Gualeguay
- 2010–2021: Boca Juniors

Senior career*
Years	Team	Apps	(Gls)
2021–2025	Boca Juniors	12	(0)
2022–2023	→ Platense (loan)	47	(5)
2024–2025	→ Platense (loan)	36	(5)
2025–	Panathinaikos	23	(7)
- * Club domestic league appearances and goals as of 14 November 2026

Vicente Taborda (born 14 June 2001) is an Argentine professional footballer who plays as an attacking midfielder for Super League Greece club Panathinaikos.

== Career ==
Taborda began playing football with his local club Centro Bancario Gualeguay, before being scouted by Boca Juniors in 2010. He made his professional and senior debut with Boca Juniors in an Argentine Primera División 0–0 draw against Banfield on 25 July 2021. On 31 August 2021, he signed his first professional contract with Boca Juniors until 2025. In June 2022, he extended his contract by one year until 2026. He then joined Platense on loan until December 2023 with an option to return early as needed. On 2 August 2023, Boca activated the option to recall him and he joined their senior squad. After returning to Boca and playing a handful of games, Taborda once again joined Platense on loan on 4 September 2024.

On 4 September 2025, Taborda joined Greek club Panathinaikos.

== Career statistics ==
As of match played 5 November 2026

Appearances and goals by club, season and competition
Club	Season	League			National cup (Note: Includes Copa Argentina, Greek Football Cup)		League cup (Note: Includes Copa de la Liga)		Continental		Total	
Club	Season	Division	Apps	Goals	Apps	Goals	Apps	Goals	Apps	Goals	Apps	Goals
Boca Juniors	2021	Primera División	3	0	—		—		—		3	0
Boca Juniors	2022	Primera División	1	0	1	0	—		—		2	0
Boca Juniors	2023	Primera División	—		1	0	4	0	1 (Note: Appearance in Copa Libertadores)	0	6	0
Boca Juniors	2024	Primera División	2	0	1	0	2	0	1 (Note: Appearance in Copa Sudamericana)	0	6	0
Boca Juniors	Total		6	0	3	0	6	0	2	0	17	0
Platense (loan)	2022	Primera División	22	3	—		—		—		22	3
Platense (loan)	2023	Primera División	25	2	2	0	—		—		27	2
Platense (loan)	Total		47	5	2	0	—		—		49	5
Platense (loan)	2025	Primera División	22	5	1	1	—		—		23	6
Panathinaikos	2025–26	Super League Greece	14	4	5	1	—		9 (Note: Appearances in UEFA Europa League)	2	28	7
Panathinaikos	2026–27	Super League Greece	8	3	1	1	—		8 (Note: Appearances in UEFA Conference League)	2	17	6
Panathinaikos	Total		22	7	6	2	—		17	4	45	13
Career total			97	17	12	3	6	0	19	4	134	24

== Honours ==
Boca Juniors

- Primera División: 2022

Platense

- Argentine Primera División: 2025 Apertura
