= Giannis Bokos =

Greek footballer

Ioannis Bokos
Personal information
- Full name: Ioannis Gavriil Bokos
- Date of birth: 3 February 2007 (age 19)
- Place of birth: Thessaloniki, Greece
- Height: 1.78 m (5 ft 10 in)
- Position: Winger

Team information
- Current team: Panathinaikos
- Number: 39

Youth career
- 2014–2020: Atermonas Kilikis
- 2020–2026: Panathinaikos

Senior career*
Years	Team	Apps	(Gls)
2025–	Panathinaikos	3	(0)

International career^{‡}
2023–2024	Greece U17	3	(0)
2024–	Greece U19	2	(0)
2025–	Greece U21	1	(0)
- * Club domestic league appearances and goals as of 8 March 2026 ‡ National team caps and goals as of 8 March 2026

Giannis Bokos (Greek: Γιάννης Μπόκος; born 3 February 2007) is a Greek professional footballer, originating from Thessaloniki, who plays as a winger for Panathinaikos. He has represented the national team at the Greece U17, U19 and U21 levels.

== Club career ==
He joined the academies of Panathinaikos in 2020 and signed his first professional contract in 2024, which runs until 2027. In 2025, he also participated in the first team's pre-season preparation. He made his debut for Panathinaikos on 17 September in a match against Athens Kallithea in the Greek Cup.

== Career statistics ==
As of 8 March 2026

Club	Season	League			Cup		Continental		Other		Total	
Club	Season	Division	Apps	Goals	Apps	Goals	Apps	Goals	Apps	Goals	Apps	Goals
Panathinaikos	2025–26	Superleague Greece	3	0	4	0	0	0	—		7	0
Career total			3	0	4	0	0	0	0	0	7	0
