= Panagiotis Biniaris =

Greek footballer

Personal information
- Full name: Panagiotis Biniaris
- Date of birth: 25 July 2009 (age 17)
- Place of birth: Vrilissia, Greece
- Height: 1.81 m (5 ft 11 in)
- Position: Midfielder

Team information
- Current team: Panathinaikos
- Number: 44

Youth career
- –2018: AO Vrilissia
- 2018–2019: Campeon Football Club
- 2019–2026: Panathinaikos

Senior career*
Years	Team	Apps	(Gls)
2026–	Panathinaikos	2	(0)

International career^{‡}
2026–	Greece U17	6	(0)
- * Club domestic league appearances and goals as of 10 September 2026 ‡ National team caps and goals as of 31 March 2026

Panagiotis Biniaris (Greek: Παναγιώτης Μπινιάρης; born 25 July 2009) is a Greek professional footballer who plays as a midfielder for Super League Greece club Panathinaikos.

== Career ==
Biniaris started his football career at a very young age in his local team AO Vrilissia, before moving in 2018 to the Campeon Football Club academy owned by the former footballer and Euro 2004 winning squad member, Vasilios Lakis. From there Panathinaikos spotted him and signed him in June 2019. From 2019 to 2026 he excelled in Panathinaikos academy, from which the club offered him a professional contract in December 2025 and culminating into winning the Greek U17 championship for the 2025–2026 season.

This success has prompted the club's technical directors Takis Fyssas and Stefanos Kotsolis, both former players of the team, to promote the player to the men's squad, citing his immense talent as the main reason, as he's being considered one of the biggest youth talents of Panathinaikos since Sotiris Ninis in the 2000s. He debuted with the team under Jacob Neestrup's coaching during a 4-0 friendly victory against Helmond Sport during the preseason in Netherlands and made his Greek Super League debut in the 3–1 victory against PAOK on 6 September 2026.
