= Athanasios Prodromitis =

Greek footballer (born 2004)

Personal information
- Date of birth: 29 February 2004 (age 22)
- Place of birth: Agrinio, Greece
- Height: 1.88 m (6 ft 2 in)
- Position: Centre-back

Team information
- Current team: Panetolikos
- Number: 5

Youth career
- 2018–2022: Panathinaikos

Senior career*
Years	Team	Apps	(Gls)
2022–2024	Panathinaikos B	58	(1)
2024–2026	Panathinaikos	0	(0)
2024–2025	→ Niki Volos (loan)	24	(3)
2025–2026	→ Athens Kallithea (loan)	12	(0)
2026–	Panetolikos	3	(0)

International career^{‡}
2022	Greece U18	3	(0)
2023	Greece U19	4	(0)
- * Club domestic league appearances and goals as of 13 September 2026 ‡ National team caps and goals as of 10 July 2023

Athanasios Prodromitis (Greek: Αθανάσιος Προδρομίτης; born 29 February 2004) is a Greek professional footballer who plays as a centre-back for Super League club Panetolikos.
