= 2023–24 US Cremonese season =

US Cremonese
2023–24 season
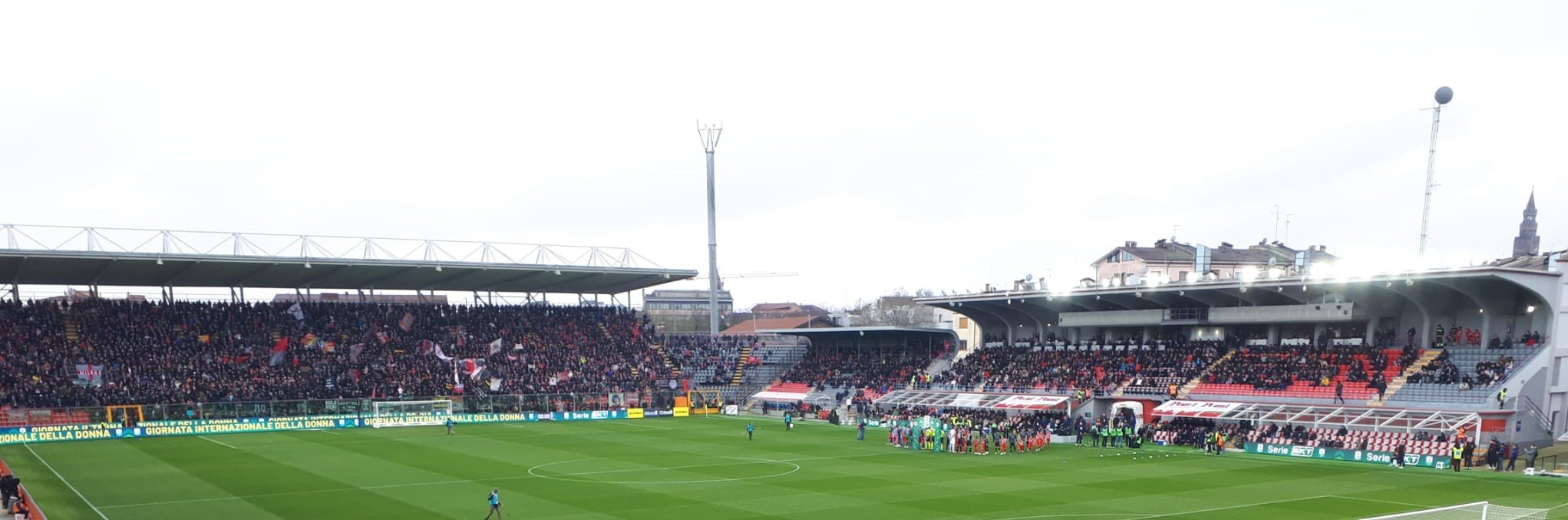
- A view of Giovanni Zini Stadium in Cremonese vs Como match (9 March 2024)
- Owner: Giovanni Arvedi
- President: Paolo Rossi
- Manager: Davide Ballardini (until 18 September); Giovanni Stroppa (from 19 September)
- Stadium: Stadio Giovanni Zini
- Serie B: 4th
- Coppa Italia: Round of 16
- Top goalscorer: League: Massimo Coda (14); All: Massimo Coda (15)

The 2023–24 season is US Cremonese's 121st season in existence and the club's first season back in the second division of Italian football. In addition to the domestic league, US Cremonese will participate in this season's edition of the Coppa Italia. The season covers the period from 1 July 2023 to 30 June 2024.

== Players ==
=== First-team squad ===
As of 17 October 2023

Note: Flags indicate national team as defined under FIFA eligibility rules; some limited exceptions apply. Players may hold more than one non-FIFA nationality.

No.	Pos.	Nation	Player
1	GK	SEN	Fallou Sarr
3	DF	ITA	Emanuele Valeri
5	DF	ITA	Luca Ravanelli
6	MF	COD	Charles Pickel
7	FW	ITA	Nikola Sekulov (on loan from Juventus)
8	MF	ITA	Michele Collocolo
9	FW	ITA	Daniel Ciofani
10	FW	ITA	Cristian Buonaiuto
11	FW	GHA	Felix Afena-Gyan
14	MF	ITA	Luca Valzania
15	DF	ITA	Matteo Bianchetti
17	DF	ITA	Leonardo Sernicola
18	DF	ITA	Paolo Ghiglione
19	MF	ITA	Michele Castagnetti
20	MF	ARG	Franco Vázquez

No.	Pos.	Nation	Player
21	GK	ITA	Gianluca Saro
22	GK	DEN	Andreas Jungdal
26	DF	BUL	Valentin Antov (on loan from Monza)
27	MF	ITA	Alessio Brambilla
31	DF	ITA	Yuri Rocchetti
32	MF	ARG	Gonzalo Abrego (on loan from Godoy Cruz)
33	DF	ITA	Giacomo Quagliata
37	MF	SLO	Žan Majer
44	DF	GEO	Luka Lochoshvili
74	FW	ITA	Frank Tsadjout
77	FW	NGR	David Okereke
90	FW	ITA	Massimo Coda (on loan from Genoa)
91	MF	ITA	Andrea Bertolacci
98	FW	ITA	Luca Zanimacchia
—	DF	ITA	Alessandro Tuia

=== Out on loan ===
Note: Flags indicate national team as defined under FIFA eligibility rules; some limited exceptions apply. Players may hold more than one non-FIFA nationality.

No.	Pos.	Nation	Player
—	GK	ITA	Federico Agazzi (at Alcione until 30 June 2024)
—	DF	AUT	Emanuel Aiwu (at Birmingham City until 30 June 2024)
—	DF	ITA	Luca Munaretti (at Renate until 30 June 2024)
—	DF	SEN	Maissa Ndiaye (at Železničar Pančevo until 30 June 2024)
—	DF	ITA	Lorenzo Bernasconi (at Atalanta until 30 June 2024)
—	DF	ITA	Mattia Scaringi (at Novara until 30 June 2024)
—	DF	ITA	Daniel Frey (at Gubbio until 30 June 2024)
—	MF	ITA	Christian Acella (at Perugia until 30 June 2024)
—	MF	ITA	Francesco Cerretelli (at Carrarese until 30 June 2024)

No.	Pos.	Nation	Player
—	MF	ITA	Matteo Ghisolfi (at Cerignola until 30 June 2024)
—	MF	ITA	Tommaso Milanese (at Ascoli until 30 June 2024)
—	MF	ITA	Filippo Nardi (at Reggiana until 30 June 2024)
—	MF	ITA	Fausto Perseu (at Latina Calcio until 30 June 2024)
—	MF	ITA	Joshua Tenkorang (at Lecco until 30 June 2024)
—	FW	ITA	Alberto Basso Ricci (at loan to Lumezzane until 30 June 2024)
—	FW	ITA	Blue Mamona (at Vis Pesaro until 30 June 2024)
—	FW	ITA	Marco Zunno (at loan to Messina until 30 June 2024)
—	FW	CIV	Cedric Gondo (at loan to Reggiana until 30 June 2024)

== Transfers ==
=== In ===
Pos.	Player	Transferred from	Fee	Date	Source
MF	(Italy) Andrea Bertolacci	(Turkey) Fatih Karagümrük	Free	1 July 2023	
MF	(Slovenia) Zan Majer	(Italy) Reggio Calabria	Free	1 July 2023	
MF	(Italy) Nikola Sekulov	(Italy) Juventus Next Gen	Loan	15 July 2023	
MF	(Argentina) Franco Vázquez	(Italy) Parma	Free	17 July 2023	
MF	(Italy) Alessio Brambilla	(Italy) Cesena	€150k	21 July 2023	
MF	(Italy) Michele Collocolo	(Italy) Ascoli	€2.00m	22 July 2023	
GK	(Denmark) Andreas Jungdal	(Italy) Milan	Free	10 August 2023	
MF	(Argentina) Gonzalo Abrego	(Argentina) Godoy Cruz	Loan	10 August 2023	
FW	(Italy) Massimo Coda	(Italy) Genoa	Loan	27 August 2023	
DF	(Bulgaria) Valentin Antov	(Italy) Monza	Loan	31 August 2023	
DF	(Italy) Yuri Rocchetti	(Italy) Triestina		1 September 2023	
DF	(Italy) Alessandro Tuia	Unattached	Free	17 October 2023	

=== Out ===
Pos.	Player	Transferred to	Fee	Date	Source
FW	(Nigeria) Cyriel Dessers	(Scotland) Rangers	€5.00m	6 July 2023	
DF	(Italy) Stefano Cella	(Italy) Ancona	€40k	15 July 2023	
FW	(Italy) Luca Strizzolo	(Italy) Modena		15 July 2023	
MF	(Romania) Dennis Politic	(Romania) Dinamo București	Free	16 July 2023	
MF	(Italy) Stefano Girelli	(Italy) Sampdoria	Free	19 July 2023	
MF	(Romania) Vlad Chiricheș	(Romania) FCSB	Free	25 July 2023	
MF	(Italy) Luca Schirone	(Italy) Pineto	Free	25 July 2023	

== Competitions ==
=== Overview ===
Competition	First match	Last match	Starting round	Final position	Record							
Competition	First match	Last match	Starting round	Final position	Pld	W	D	L	GF	GA	GD	Win %
Serie B	22 August 2023	10 May 2024	Matchday 1	4th	38	19	10	9	50	3	+47	50.00
Coppa Italia	14 August 2023	3 January 2024	Round of 64	Round of 16	3	2	0	1	5	4	+1	66.67
Total					41	21	10	10	55	7	+48	51.22

Source: Competitions

=== Serie B ===
==== League table ====
Pos	Team	Pld	W	D	L	GF	GA	GD	Pts	Promotion, qualification or relegation
2	Como (P)	38	21	10	7	58	40	+18	73	Promotion to Serie A
3	Venezia (O, P)	38	21	7	10	69	46	+23	70	Qualification for promotion play-offs semi-finals
4	Cremonese	38	19	10	9	50	32	+18	67	Qualification for promotion play-offs semi-finals
5	Catanzaro	38	17	9	12	59	50	+9	60	Qualification for promotion play-offs preliminary round
6	Palermo	38	15	11	12	62	53	+9	56	Qualification for promotion play-offs preliminary round

Source: Soccerway (in English)
Rules for classification: 1) Points; 2) Head-to-head points; 3) Head-to-head goal difference; 4) Goal difference; 5) Goals scored; 6) Draw.
(Note: Head-to-head record is used only after all the matches between the teams in question have been played)
(O) Play-off winners; (P) Promoted

==== Results summary ====
Overall								Home						Away					
Pld	W	D	L	GF	GA	GD	Pts	W	D	L	GF	GA	GD	W	D	L	GF	GA	GD
38	19	10	9	50	32	+18	67	9	5	5	26	15	+11	10	5	4	24	17	+7

Source: Worldfootball

==== Results by round ====
Round	1	2	3	4	5	6	7	8	9	10	11	12	13	14	15	16	17	18	19
Ground	H	H	A	H	A	H	A	H	A	H	A	H	A	H	A	H	A	H	A
Result	D	L	W	D	D	D	W	L	W	L	W	W	W	W	D	W	L	W	L
Position	10	14	9	8	11	12	8	10	7	9	8	6	4	3	5	5	5	4	5

Source: Worldfootball
A = Away; H = Home; W = Win; D = Draw; L = Loss

==== Matches ====
The league fixtures were unveiled on 11 July 2023.

19 August 2023 1	Cremonese	0–0	Catanzaro	Cremona
20:30 CET (UTC+1)				Stadium: Stadio Giovanni Zini

26 August 2023 2	Cremonese	0–1	Bari	Cremona
20:30 CET (UTC+1)				Stadium: Stadio Giovanni Zini

30 August 2023 3	Ternana	0–1	Cremonese	Terni
20:30 CEST (UTC+2)				Stadium: Stadio Libero Liberati

23 September 2023 6	Cremonese	2–2	Ascoli	Cremona
14:00 CET (UTC+1)				Stadium: Stadio Giovanni Zini

26 September 2023 7	Cosenza	1–2	Cremonese	Cosenza
18:15 CEST (UTC+2)				Stadium: Stadio San Vito-Gigi Marulla

1 October 2023 8	Cremonese	1–2	Parma	Cremona
18:30 CET (UTC+1)				Stadium: Stadio Giovanni Zini; Referee: Alessandro Prontera

8 October 2023 9	Como	1–3	Cremonese	Como
16:15 CEST (UTC+2)				Stadium: Stadio Giuseppe Sinigaglia

21 October 2023 10	Cremonese	0–1	Südtirol	Cremona
14:00 CEST (UTC+2)				Stadium: Stadio Giovanni Zini

27 October 2023 11	Cittadella	1–2	Cremonese	Cittadella
20:30 CEST (UTC+2)				Stadium: Stadio Pier Cesare Tombolato

5 November 2023 12	Cremonese	3–0	Spezia	Cremona
16:15 CET (UTC+1)		Report		Stadium: Stadio Giovanni Zini

12 November 2023 13	Brescia	0–3	Cremonese	Brescia
14:00 CET (UTC+1)		Report		Stadium: Stadio Mario Rigamonti

25 November 2023 14	Cremonese	1–0	Lecco	Cremona
14:00 CET (UTC+1)		Report		Stadium: Stadio Giovanni Zini

2 December 2023 15	Pisa	0–0	Cremonese	Pisa
14:00 CET (UTC+1)		Report		Stadium: Arena Garibaldi

9 December 2023 16	Cremonese	1–0	Venezia	Cremona
--:-- CET (UTC+1)		Report		Stadium: Stadio Giovanni Zini

16 December 2023 17	Feralpisalò	1–0	Cremonese	Piacenza
14:00 CET (UTC+1)		Report		Stadium: Stadio Leonardo Garilli

23 December 2023 18	Cremonese	4–0	Modena	Cremona
--:-- CET (UTC+1)		Report		Stadium: Stadio Giovanni Zini

26 December 2023 19	Palermo	3–2	Cremonese	Palermo
18:00 CET (UTC+1)		Report		Stadium: Stadio Renzo Barbera

14 January 2024 20	Cremonese	1–0	Cosenza	Cremona
--:-- CET (UTC+1)				Stadium: Stadio Giovanni Zini

27 January 2024 22	Cremonese	1–0	Brescia	Cremona
--:-- CET (UTC+1)				Stadium: Stadio Giovanni Zini

10 February 2024 24	Cremonese	1–1	Reggiana	Cremona
--:-- CET (UTC+1)				Stadium: Stadio Giovanni Zini

24 February 2024 26	Cremonese	2–2	Palermo	Cremona
--:-- CET (UTC+1)				Stadium: Stadio Giovanni Zini

9 March 2024 29	Cremonese	2–1	Como	Cremona
--:-- CET (UTC+1)				Stadium: Stadio Giovanni Zini

1 April 2024 31	Cremonese	0–1	Feralpisalò	Cremona
--:-- CEST (UTC+2)				Stadium: Stadio Giovanni Zini

13 April 2024 33	Cremonese	1–2	Ternana	Cremona
14:00 CEST (UTC+2)		Report		Stadium: Stadio Giovanni Zini; Referee: Francesco Cosso

20 April 2024 34	Catanzaro	0–0	Cremonese	Catanzaro
16:15		Report		Stadium: Stadio Nicola Ceravolo; Referee: Federico Dionisi

26 April 2024 35	Venezia	2–1	Cremonese	Venice
20:30		Report		Stadium: Stadio Pier Luigi Penzo; Referee: Livio Marinelli

1 May 2024 36	Cremonese	v	Pisa	Cremona
--:-- CEST (UTC+2)				Stadium: Stadio Giovanni Zini

10 May 2024 38	Cremonese	v	Cittadella	Cremona
--:-- CEST (UTC+2)				Stadium: Stadio Giovanni Zini

==== Promotion play-offs ====
21 May 2024 Semi-finals; First leg	TBD	v	Cremonese	TBD

25 May 2024 Semi-finals; Second leg	Cremonese	v	TBD	Cremona
				Stadium: Stadio Giovanni Zini

=== Coppa Italia ===
14 August 2023 Round of 64	Cremonese	3–1 (a.e.t.)	Crotone	Cremona
17:45 CEST (UTC+2)		Report		Stadium: Stadio Giovanni Zini; Attendance: 3,372; Referee: Luca Zufferli

31 October 2023 Round of 32	Cremonese	2–1 (a.e.t.)	Cittadella	Cremona
15:00 CET (UTC+1)		Report		Stadium: Stadio Giovanni Zini

4 January 2024 Round of 16	Roma	2–1	Cremonese	Rome
21:00 CET (UTC+1)	Llorente (yellow card) 34'; Celik (yellow card) 40'; Karsdorp (yellow card) 72'; Lukaku 77'; Dybala 85'	Report	Castagnetti (yellow card) 2'; Ghiglione (yellow card) 8'; Antov (yellow card) 9'; Tsadjout 37'; Bianchetti (yellow card) 78'	Stadium: Stadio Olimpico; Attendance: 61,975; Referee: Luca Pairetto
