= 2025–26 US Cremonese season =

123rd season in existence of US Cremonese

Cremonese
2025–26 season
- Owner: Giovanni Arvedi
- Manager: Davide Nicola (until 18 March); Marco Giampaolo (from 18 March)
- Stadium: Stadio Giovanni Zini
- Serie A: 18th (relegated)
- Coppa Italia: First round
- Top goalscorer: League: Federico Bonazzoli (10); All: Federico Bonazzoli (10)
- Highest home attendance: 14,808 vs Juventus; 1 November 2025, Serie A
- Lowest home attendance: 5,845 vs Palermo; 16 August 2025, Coppa Italia
- Average home league attendance: 12,114
- Biggest win: 3–0 vs Pisa (A); 10 May 2026, Serie A
- Biggest defeat: 0–5 vs Juventus (A); 12 January 2026, Serie A
Home colours	Away colours	Third colours

The 2025–26 season was the 123rd season in the history of Unione Sportiva Cremonese and their first season back in Serie A since the 2022–23 season following promotion from the Serie B in the previous season. In addition to Serie A, the club also participated in the Coppa Italia.

On 13 June 2025, the club announced that the contract of manager Giovanni Stroppa will not be renewed and will expire at the end of the season, after securing promotion with the Grigiorossi through the play-offs. On 2 July 2025, Davide Nicola was appointed as the new manager until 2027. On 18 March 2026, Marco Giampaolo was appointed manager of Cremonese.

== Squad ==
Note: Flags indicate national team as defined under FIFA eligibility rules; some limited exceptions apply. Players may hold more than one non-FIFA nationality.

No.	Pos.	Nation	Player
1	GK	IDN	Emil Audero (on loan from Como)
3	DF	ITA	Giuseppe Pezzella
4	DF	ITA	Tommaso Barbieri
6	DF	ITA	Federico Baschirotto
7	MF	ITA	Alessio Zerbin (on loan from Napoli)
8	MF	ITA	Mattia Valoti
9	FW	ITA	Manuel De Luca
10	FW	ENG	Jamie Vardy
11	FW	NOR	Dennis Johnsen
14	FW	CMR	Faris Moumbagna (on loan from Marseille)
15	DF	ITA	Matteo Bianchetti (captain)
16	GK	ITA	Marco Silvestri
17	DF	ITA	Leonardo Sernicola
18	MF	ITA	Michele Collocolo
19	MF	ECU	Jeremy Sarmiento (on loan from Brighton & Hove Albion)

No.	Pos.	Nation	Player
20	FW	ARG	Franco Vázquez
22	DF	ITA	Romano Floriani Mussolini (on loan from Lazio)
23	DF	ITA	Federico Ceccherini
24	DF	ITA	Filippo Terracciano (on loan from AC Milan)
27	MF	BEL	Jari Vandeputte
30	DF	SEN	Mikayil Faye (on loan from Rennes)
32	MF	ARG	Martín Payero (on loan from Udinese)
33	MF	ITA	Alberto Grassi
38	MF	FRA	Warren Bondo (on loan from Milan)
48	MF	GEO	Dachi Lordkipanidze
55	DF	ITA	Francesco Folino
69	GK	ITA	Lapo Nava
77	FW	NGR	David Okereke
90	FW	ITA	Federico Bonazzoli
99	FW	PAR	Antonio Sanabria

== Transfers and contracts ==
=== In ===
Date	Pos.	No.	Player	From	Fee	Notes	Ref.
30 June 2025	DF	17	(Italy) Leonardo Sernicola	(Italy) Pisa	Loan return		
30 June 2025	FW	77	(Nigeria) David Okereke	(Turkey) Gaziantep	Loan return		
1 July 2025	GK	1	(Italy) Andrea Fulignati	(Italy) Catanzaro	€1,400,000	From loan to definitive purchase	
1 July 2025	MF	27	(Belgium) Jari Vandeputte	(Italy) Catanzaro	€3,300,000	From loan to definitive purchase	
17 July 2025	GK	69	(Italy) Lapo Nava	(Italy) AC Milan	Free		
19 July 2025	MF	33	(Italy) Alberto Grassi	(Italy) Empoli	Free		
25 July 2025	DF	3	(Italy) Giuseppe Pezzella	(Italy) Empoli	€2,000,000		
29 July 2025	DF	6	(Italy) Federico Baschirotto	(Italy) Lecce	€3,000,000		
13 August 2025	GK	16	(Italy) Marco Silvestri	(Italy) Empoli	Free		
21 August 2025	FW	99	(Paraguay) Antonio Sanabria	(Italy) Torino	€2,500,000	+ €500,000 in bonus	
31 August 2025	FW	10	(England) Jamie Vardy	(England) Leicester City	Free		

=== Loans in ===
Date	Pos.	No.	Player	From	Fee	Notes	Ref.
14 July 2025	DF	22	(Italy) Romano Floriani Mussolini	(Italy) Lazio	Free	Option to buy for €5,000,000	
27 July 2025	GK	1	(Indonesia) Emil Audero	(Italy) Como	Free	Option to buy for an undisclosed fee	
29 July 2025	FW	7	(Italy) Alessio Zerbin	(Italy) Napoli	€250,000	Option to buy for €3,000,000, obligation to buy for €3,000,000 under conditions	
11 August 2025	DF	24	(Italy) Filippo Terracciano	(Italy) AC Milan	€500,000	Obligation to buy for an undisclosed fee under conditions	
12 August 2025	MF	38	(France) Warren Bondo	(Italy) AC Milan	€500,000		
22 August 2025	MF	32	(Argentina) Martín Payero	(Italy) Udinese	€1,000,000	Obligation to buy or €6,500,000 under conditions	
31 August 2025	FW	14	(Cameroon) Faris Moumbagna	(France) Marseille	€300,000	Obligation to buy or €7,000,000 under conditions	
1 September 2025	MF	19	(Ecuador) Jeremy Sarmiento	(England) Brighton & Hove Albion	Free	Option to buy for an undisclosed fee, obligation to buy for an undisclosed fee	
1 September 2025	DF	30	(Senegal) Mikayil Faye	(France) Rennes	Free	Option to buy for €10,000,000	

▼ Expenditure: €14,750,000

=== Out ===
Date	Pos.	No.	Player	To	Fee	Notes	Ref.
30 June 2025	GK	12	(Italy) Giacomo Drago	(Italy) Südtirol	Loan return		
30 June 2025	DF	26	(Bulgaria) Valentin Antov	(Italy) Monza	Loan return		
30 June 2025	MF	14	(Italy) Francesco Gelli	(Italy) Frosinone	Loan return		
1 July 2025	GK	22	(Denmark) Andreas Jungdal	(Belgium) Westerlo	€1,000,000	From loan to definitive purchase	
1 July 2025	GK	—	(Senegal) Fallou Sarr	(Italy) Spezia	€200,000	From loan to definitive purchase	
1 July 2025	DF	—	(Italy) Luca Munaretti	(Italy) Virtus Verona	Free		
1 July 2025	FW	—	(Italy) Marco Zunno	(Italy) Crotone	Free		
7 July 2025	FW	—	(Italy) Alberto Basso Ricci	(Italy) Arzignano Valchiampo	Free		
8 July 2025	MF	37	(Slovenia) Žan Majer	(Italy) Mantova	Free		
9 July 2025	MF	—	(Uruguay) César Falletti	(Italy) Mantova	Free		
12 July 2025	DF	44	(Georgia (country)) Luka Lochoshvili	(Germany) Nürnberg	€1,000,000		
25 July 2025	MF	—	(Italy) Andrea Bertolacci	Retired			
30 July 2025	DF	3	(Italy) Giacomo Quagliata	(Spain) Deportivo de La Coruña	Undisclosed		
4 August 2025	MF	—	(Italy) Joshua Tenkorang	(Italy) Ravenna	Free		
11 August 2025	DF	7	(Brazil) Paulo Azzi	(Italy) Monza	Undisclosed		
11 August 2025	DF	5	(Italy) Luca Ravanelli	(Italy) Monza	Undisclosed		
13 August 2025	DF	—	(Senegal) Maissa Ndiaye	(Italy) Lumezzane	Undisclosed		
25 August 2025	GK	30	(Sweden) Jakob Tånnander	(Portugal) Farense	Free		
27 August 2025	MF	10	(Democratic Republic of the Congo) Charles Pickel	(Spain) Espanyol	€1,000,000		
29 August 2025	MF	19	(Italy) Michele Castagnetti	(Italy) Cesena	Undisclosed		

=== Loans out ===
Date	Pos.	No.	Player	From	Fee	Notes	Ref.
4 July 2025	DF	—	(Italy) Samuele Regazzetti	(Italy) Ospitaletto	Free		
11 July 2025	GK	—	(Italy) Federico Agazzi	(Italy) Alcione Milano	Free		
11 July 2025	DF	—	(Italy) Daniele Triacca	(Italy) Trento	Free	From Primavera squad	
13 July 2025	DF	—	(Italy) Eddy Cabianca	(Italy) Salernitana	Free		
13 July 2025	FW	—	(Italy) Michele Bigonzoni	(Italy) Latina	Free		
15 July 2025	DF	—	(Italy) Tommaso Duca	(Italy) Giana Erminio	Free	From Primavera squad	
29 July 2025	GK	1	(Italy) Andrea Fulignati	(Italy) Empoli	Free	Obligation to buy for an undisclosed fee under conditions	
2 August 2025	FW	—	(Denmark) David Stückler	(Italy) Vicenza	Free		
4 August 2025	DF	—	(Italy) Mattia Scaringi	(Italy) Ravenna	Free		
4 August 2025	MF	—	(Italy) Alessio Brambilla	(Italy) Bra	Free		
6 August 2025	FW	—	(Italy) Blue Mamona	(Italy) Sarnese	Free		
7 August 2025	MF	—	(Italy) Salvatore Dore	(Italy) Pergolettese	Free		
7 August 2025	MF	62	(Italy) Tommaso Milanese	(Italy) Ascoli	Free	Obligation to buy for an undisclosed fee under conditions	
7 August 2025	FW	98	(Italy) Luca Zanimacchia	(Italy) Modena	Free	Option to buy for an undisclosed fee, obligation to buy for an undisclosed fee under conditions	
18 August 2025	FW	91	(Italy) Marco Nasti	(Italy) Empoli	Free	Option to buy for an undisclosed fee	
20 August 2025	FW	13	(Ghana) Felix Afena-Gyan	(Turkey) Amedspor	Free	Option to buy for an undisclosed fee	
25 August 2025	DF	42	(Italy) Lorenzo Moretti	(Italy) Virtus Entella	Free		
1 September 2025	GK	21	(Italy) Gianluca Saro	(Italy) Reggiana	Free		
1 September 2025	DF	—	(Italy) Yuri Rocchetti	(Italy) Potenza	Free	Obligation to buy for an undisclosed fee under conditions	
1 September 2025	FW	74	(Italy) Frank Tsadjout	(Italy) Pescara	Free		

▲ Income: €2,000,000

== Pre-season and friendlies ==
On 27 June 2025, Cremonese announced a friendly against Torino in Prad am Stilfser Joch before a 10-day training camp in Livigno. Two weeks later, another friendly against Pro Patria in Livigno was confirmed.

Win Draw Loss Fixtures

26 July 2025 Friendly	Torino (Italy)	4–1	(Italy) Cremonese	Prad am Stilfser Joch, Italy
16:00 CEST		Report		Stadium: Fußballplatz Prad am Stilfserjoch

3 August 2025 Friendly	Cremonese (Italy)	3–0	(Italy) Pro Patria	Livigno, Italy
16:00 CEST		Report		Stadium: Preparazione Olimpica AQ1816

10 August 2025 Friendly	Reggiana (Italy)	0–0	(Italy) Cremonese	Luzzara, Italy
16:00 CEST		Report		Stadium: Stadio Compagnoni

== Competitions ==
=== Overall record ===
Competition	First match	Last match	Starting round	Record							
Competition	First match	Last match	Starting round	Pld	W	D	L	GF	GA	GD	Win %
Serie A	23 August 2025	May 2026	Matchday 1	33	6	10	17	26	47	−21	18.18
Coppa Italia	16 August 2025	TBD	First round	1	0	0	1	0	0	+0	0.00
Total				34	6	10	18	26	47	−21	17.65

Last updated: 22 April 2026
Source: Soccerway

=== Serie A ===
==== League table ====
Pos	Team	Pld	W	D	L	GF	GA	GD	Pts	Qualification or relegation
16	Genoa	38	10	11	17	41	51	−10	41	
17	Lecce	38	10	8	20	28	50	−22	38	
18	Cremonese (R)	38	8	10	20	32	57	−25	34	Relegation to Serie B
19	Hellas Verona (R)	38	3	12	23	25	61	−36	21	Relegation to Serie B
20	Pisa (R)	38	2	12	24	26	71	−45	18	Relegation to Serie B

Source: Serie A
Rules for classification: 1) Points; 2) Tiebreaker for Champions team and third relegated team; 3) Head-to-head points; 4) Head-to-head goal difference; 5) Goal difference; 6) Goals scored; 7) Draw.
(Note: Head-to-head record is used only after all the matches between the teams in question have been played)
(R) Relegated

==== Results summary ====
Overall								Home						Away					
Pld	W	D	L	GF	GA	GD	Pts	W	D	L	GF	GA	GD	W	D	L	GF	GA	GD
15	5	5	5	18	18	0	20	2	3	2	9	9	0	3	2	3	9	9	0

Last updated: 17 December 2025.
Source: Soccerway

==== Results by round ====
Round	1	2	3	4	5	6	7	8	9	10	11	12	13	14	15	16	17	18	19	20	21	22	23	24	25	26	27	28	29	30	31	32	33	34	35	36	37	38
Ground	A	H	A	H	A	A	H	H	A	H	A	H	A	H	A	A	H	A	H	A	H	A	H	A	H	A	H	A	H	A	H	A	H	A	H	H	A	H
Result	W	W	D	D	D	L	D	D	W	L	L	L	W	W	L																							
Position	5	3	3	6	7	10	10	11	8	10	11	11	11	9	11																							
Points	3	6	7	8	9	9	10	11	14	14	14	14	17	20	20																							

Source: Serie A
A = Away; H = Home; W = Win; D = Draw; L = Loss; P = Postponed

==== Matches ====
The league fixtures were released on 6 June 2025.

Win Draw Loss Fixtures

23 August 2025 1	AC Milan	1–2	Cremonese	Milan
20:45 CEST	Pavlović 45+1'; Jiménez (yellow card) 78'	Report	Baschirotto 28'; Grassi (yellow card) 48'; Bonazzoli 61'; Terracciano (yellow card) 69'; Payero (yellow card) 77'; Bondo (yellow card) 88'	Stadium: San Siro; Attendance: 75,011; Referee: Giuseppe Collu

29 August 2025 2	Cremonese	3–2	Sassuolo	Cremona
18:30 CEST	Sanabria (yellow card) 6'; Terracciano 37'; Vázquez 39'; Grassi (yellow card) 72'; De Luca 90+3' (pen.)	Report	Doig (yellow card) 43'; Pinamonti 63'; Berardi 73' (pen.); Iannoni (yellow card) 90+5'	Stadium: Stadio Giovanni Zini; Attendance: 10,300; Referee: Marco Guida

15 September 2025 3	Hellas Verona	0–0	Cremonese	Verona
18:30 CEST	Serdar (yellow card) 43'; Giovane (yellow card) 45+2'	Report	Collocolo (yellow card) 78'	Stadium: Stadio Marcantonio Bentegodi; Attendance: 21,406; Referee: Alberto Ruben Arena

21 September 2025 4	Cremonese	0–0	Parma	Cremona
15:00 CEST	Pezzella (yellow card) 66'	Report		Stadium: Stadio Giovanni Zini; Attendance: 13,548; Referee: Federico La Penna

28 September 2025 5	Como	1–1	Cremonese	Como
15:00 CEST	Perrone (yellow card) 28'; Paz 32'; Ramón (yellow card) 33'; Rodríguez (red card) 82'; Da Cunha (yellow card) 90+3'	Report	Baschirotto (yellow card) 9', (goal) 69'; Payero (yellow card) 52'; Floriani Mussolini (yellow card) 85'; Sanabria (yellow card) 87'	Stadium: Stadio Giuseppe Sinigaglia; Attendance: 10,534; Referee: Marco Di Bello

4 October 2025 6	Internazionale	4–1	Cremonese	Milan
18:00 CEST (UTC+2)	L. Martínez 6'; Bonny 38'; Dimarco 55'; Barella 57'; Sučić (yellow card) 84'	Report	Pezzella (yellow card) 86'; Bonazzoli 87'	Stadium: San Siro; Attendance: 73,417; Referee: Ermanno Feliciani

19 October 2025 7	Cremonese	1–1	Udinese	Cremona
15:00 CEST		Report		Stadium: Stadio Giovanni Zini

25 October 2025 8	Cremonese	1–1	Atalanta	Cremona
20:45 CEST (UTC+2)	Floriani Mussolini (yellow card) 16'; Vardy (yellow card) 51', (goal) 78'; Vázquez (yellow card) 90+4'	Report	Scamacca (yellow card) 76'; Brescianini 84'	Stadium: Stadio Giovanni Zini; Attendance: 11,052; Referee: Alberto Arena

29 October 2025 9	Genoa	0–2	Cremonese	Genoa
15:00 CET		Report		Stadium: Stadio Luigi Ferraris

1 November 2025 10	Cremonese	1–2	Juventus	Cremona
20:45 CET (UTC+1)	Bianchetti (yellow card) 74'; Vardy 83'	Report	Kostić 2'; Cambiaso 68'	Stadium: Stadio Giovanni Zini; Attendance: 14,868; Referee: Daniele Chiffi

9 November 2025 11	Pisa	1–0	Cremonese	Pisa
15:00 CET		Report		Stadium: Arena Garibaldi – Stadio Romeo Anconetani

23 November 2025 12	Cremonese	1–3	Roma	Cremona
15:00 CET (UTC+1)	Payero (yellow card) 32'; Bondo (yellow card) 82'; Folino 90+3'	Report	Soulé 17'; Ziółkowski (yellow card) 45'; Ferguson 64'; Wesley 69'; El Aynaoui (yellow card) 84'	Stadium: Stadio Giovanni Zini; Attendance: 14,666; Referee: Giovanni Ayroldi

30 November 2025 13	Bologna	1–3	Cremonese	Bologna
15:00 CET		Report		Stadium: Stadio Renato Dall'Ara

7 December 2025 14	Cremonese	2–0	Lecce	Cremona
15:00 CET	Bonazzoli 53' (pen.); Sanabria 78'; Bianchetti (yellow card) 83'	Report	Banda (yellow card) 45+3'; Gallo (yellow card) 84'	Stadium: Stadio Giovanni Zini; Referee: Giuseppe Mucera

13 December 2025 15	Torino	1–0	Cremonese	Turin
15:00 CET	Vlašić 27'; Pedersen (yellow card) 90+9'	Report	Barbieri (yellow card) 36'; Payero (yellow card) 90+3'	Stadium: Stadio Olimpico Grande Torino; Attendance: 18,297; Referee: Livio Marinelli

21 December 2025 16	Lazio	0–0	Cremonese	Rome
15:00 CET	Pedro (yellow card) 38'; Romagnoli (yellow card) 77'; Guendouzi (yellow card) 79'; Gila (yellow card) 90+2'	Report	Grassi (yellow card) 43'; Barbieri (yellow card) 68'; Pezzella (yellow card) 81'; Ceccherini (red card) 90+4'	Stadium: Stadio Olimpico; Referee: Luca Pairetto

28 December 2025 17	Cremonese	0–2	Napoli	Cremona
15:00 CET	Barbieri (yellow card) 58'; Bonazzoli (yellow card) 84'	Report	Højlund 13', 45'; Juan Jesus (yellow card) 34'; McTominay (yellow card) 45+3'	Stadium: Stadio Giovanni Zini; Referee: Maurizio Mariani

4 January 2026 18	Fiorentina	1–0	Cremonese	Florence
15:00 CET	Dodô (yellow card) 42'; Kean 90+2'	Report	Bondo (yellow card) 20'; Payero (yellow card) 42'	Stadium: Stadio Artemio Franchi; Referee: Federico La Penna

8 January 2026 19	Cremonese	2–2	Cagliari	Cremona
15:00 CET	Johnsen 4'; Bondo (yellow card) 11'; Vardy 29'; Bonazzoli (yellow card) 81'	Report	Borrelli (yellow card) 2'; Adopo 51'; Trepy 88'; Luperto (yellow card) 90+2'	Stadium: Stadio Giovanni Zini; Referee: Kevin Bonacina

12 January 2026 20	Juventus	5–0	Cremonese	Turin
15:00 CET	Bremer 12'; David 15'; Yıldız (penalty missed) 35', 35'; Terracciano 48' (o.g.); McKennie 64'	Report	Pezzella (yellow card) 68'	Stadium: Juventus Stadium; Attendance: 39,585; Referee: Ermanno Feliciani

19 January 2026 21	Cremonese	0–0	Hellas Verona	Cremona
18:30 CEST (UTC+2)	Bonazzoli (yellow card) 37'; Vandeputte (yellow card) 42'; Vardy (yellow card) 74'	Report		Stadium: Stadio Giovanni Zini; Referee: Alberto Ruben Arena

25 January 2026 22	Sassuolo	1–0	Cremonese	Reggio Emilia
15:00 CET	Fadera 3'	Report		Stadium: Mapei Stadium – Città del Tricolore; Attendance: 11,111; Referee: Giuseppe Collu

1 February 2026 23	Cremonese	0–2	Internazionale	Cremona
18:00 CET (UTC+1)	Ceccherini (yellow card) 54'; Baschirotto (yellow card) 73'; Vardy (yellow card) 86'	Report	L. Martínez 16'; Zieliński 31'	Stadium: Stadio Giovanni Zini; Attendance: 14,824; Referee: Davide Massa

9 February 2026 24	Atalanta	2–1	Cremonese	Bergamo
18:30 CET (UTC+1)	Krstović 13'; Zappacosta 25'; Kolašinac (yellow card) 49'; Kossounou (yellow card) 82'	Report	Thorsby 90+4'	Stadium: Gewiss Stadium; Attendance: 21,796; Referee: Marco Piccinini

15 February 2026 25	Cremonese	0–0	Genoa	Cremona
15:00 CET		Report		Stadium: Stadio Giovanni Zini; Attendance: 13,128; Referee: Simone Sozza

22 February 2026 26	Roma	3–0	Cremonese	Rome
20:45 CET (UTC+1)	Cristante 59'; El Aynaoui (yellow card) 66'; Ndicka 77'; Pisilli 86'	Report	Thorsby (yellow card) 24'	Stadium: Stadio Olimpico; Attendance: 59,025; Referee: Marco Di Bello

1 March 2026 27	Cremonese	0–2	Milan	Cremona
12:30 CET (UTC+1)	Terracciano (yellow card) 76'; Maleh (yellow card) 85'	Report	Pavlović 90'; Leão 90+4'	Stadium: Stadio Giovanni Zini; Attendance: 14,711; Referee: Davide Massa

8 March 2026 28	Lecce	2–1	Cremonese	Lecce
15:00 CET	Pierotti 22'; Štulić 38' (pen.)	Report	Bonazzoli 47'; Pezzella 90+8'	Stadium: Stadio Via del mare Attendance: 27,705; Referee: Simone Sozza

16 March 2026 29	Cremonese	1–4	Fiorentina	Cremona
20:45 CET (UTC+1)	Bondo (yellow card) 27'; Okereke 57'	Report	Parisi 25'; Piccoli 32'; Dodô 49'; Guðmundsson 70'	Stadium: Stadio Giovanni Zini; Attendance: 11,030; Referee: Marco Di Bello

22 March 2026 30	Parma	0–2	Cremonese	Parma
15:00 CET		Report	Maleh 54'; Vandeputte 68'	Stadium: Stadio Ennio Tardini; Attendance: 16,284; Referee: Michael Fabbri

5 April 2026 31	Cremonese	1–2	Bologna	Cremona
15:00 CEST (UTC+2)	Maleh (yellow card) 45', (red card) 90+4'; Bonazzoli 90+1' (pen.); Payero (yellow card) 90+5'	Report	João Mário 3'; Rowe 16'; Ravaglia (yellow card) 75'; Ferguson (yellow card) 90+5' (yellow-red card) 90+6'	Stadium: Stadio Giovanni Zini; Attendance: 10,629; Referee: Rosario Abisso

12 April 2026 32	Cagliari	1–0	Cremonese	Cagliari
15:00 CEST	Esposito 63'	Report		Stadium: Unipol Domus; Attendance: 16,412; Referee: Daniele Doveri

19 April 2026 33	Cremonese	0–0	Torino	Cremona
15:00 CEST		Report		Stadium: Stadio Giovanni Zini; Attendance: 12,242; Referee: Michael Fabbri

26 April 2026 34	Napoli	4–0	Cremonese	Naples
15:00 CEST		Report		Stadium: Stadio Diego Armando Maradona

3 May 2026 35	Cremonese	v	Lazio	Cremona
15:00 CEST		Report		Stadium: Stadio Giovanni Zini

10 May 2026 36	Cremonese	v	Pisa	Cremona
15:00 CEST		Report		Stadium: Stadio Giovanni Zini

17 May 2026 37	Udinese	v	Cremonese	Udine
15:00 CEST		Report		Stadium: Stadio Friuli

24 May 2026 38	Cremonese	v	Como	Cremona
15:00 CEST		Report		Stadium: Stadio Giovanni Zini

=== Coppa Italia ===
As the 20th seeded Serie A side (due to its promotion position from the 2024-25 Serie B season), Cremonese entered the Coppa Italia in the first round, and were drawn at home to Serie B side Palermo.

Win Draw Loss Fixtures

16 August 2025 First round	Cremonese	0–0 (4–5 p)	Palermo	Cremona
21:15 CEST		Report		Stadium: Stadio Giovanni Zini; Attendance: 5,845; Referee: Andrea Zanotti
	Penalties
	Bondo (penalty scored); Vázquez (penalty scored); Floriani Mussolini (penalty scored); Terracciano (penalty scored); Johnsen (penalty missed)		(penalty scored) Brunori; (penalty scored) Palumbo; (penalty scored) Corona; (penalty scored) Augello; (penalty scored) Ceccaroni

== Statistics ==
As of pre-season

=== Appearances ===
Players with no appearances are not included on the list.

No.	Pos	Nat	Player	Total		Serie A		Coppa Italia	
No.	Pos	Nat	Player	Apps	Goals	Apps	Goals	Apps	Goals

=== Goals ===
Rank	Pos.	No.	Player	Serie A	Coppa Italia	Total
Total				0	0	0

=== Clean sheets ===
Rank	No.	Player	Serie A	Coppa Italia	Total
Total			0	0	0

=== Disciplinary record ===
No.	Pos.	Player	Serie A			Coppa Italia			Total		
No.	Pos.	Player	Yellow card	(yellow card) (yellow-red card)	Red card	Yellow card	(yellow card) (yellow-red card)	Red card	Yellow card	(yellow card) (yellow-red card)	Red card
Total			0	0	0	0	0	0	0	0	0
