= 2022–23 US Cremonese season =

US Cremonese
2022–23 season
- Owner: Giovanni Arvedi
- President: Paolo Rossi
- Coach: Massimiliano Alvini (until 14 January); Davide Ballardini (from 15 January)
- Stadium: Stadio Giovanni Zini
- Serie A: 19th (relegated)
- Coppa Italia: Semi-finals
- Top goalscorer: League: Daniel Ciofani (8); All: David Okereke (9)
Home colours	Away colours	Third colours

The 2022–23 season was the 120th season in the history of US Cremonese and the club's first season back in the top flight since 1996. The club participated in Serie A and the Coppa Italia.

== Players ==
=== Current squad ===
As of 31 January 2023

Note: Flags indicate national team as defined under FIFA eligibility rules; some limited exceptions apply. Players may hold more than one non-FIFA nationality.

No.	Pos.	Nation	Player
3	DF	ITA	Emanuele Valeri
4	DF	AUT	Emanuel Aiwu
5	MF	MEX	Johan Vásquez (on loan from Genoa)
6	MF	COD	Charles Pickel
9	FW	ITA	Daniel Ciofani (captain)
10	FW	ITA	Cristian Buonaiuto
12	GK	ITA	Marco Carnesecchi (on loan from Atalanta)
13	GK	ITA	Gianluca Saro
15	DF	ITA	Matteo Bianchetti
17	DF	ITA	Leonardo Sernicola
18	DF	ITA	Paolo Ghiglione
19	MF	ITA	Michele Castagnetti
20	FW	GHA	Felix Afena-Gyan

No.	Pos.	Nation	Player
21	DF	ROU	Vlad Chiricheș (vice-captain)
22	GK	POL	Dorian Ciężkowski
23	MF	ITA	Christian Acella
24	DF	ITA	Alex Ferrari (on loan from Sampdoria)
26	MF	ITA	Marco Benassi (on loan from Fiorentina)
27	MF	CHI	Pablo Galdames (on loan from Genoa)
28	MF	FRA	Soualiho Meïté (on loan from Benfica)
33	DF	ITA	Giacomo Quagliata
44	DF	GEO	Luka Lochoshvili
45	GK	SEN	Fallou Sarr
74	FW	ITA	Frank Tsadjout
77	FW	NGR	David Okereke
90	FW	NGR	Cyriel Dessers

=== Out on loan ===
As of 31 January 2023.

Note: Flags indicate national team as defined under FIFA eligibility rules; some limited exceptions apply. Players may hold more than one non-FIFA nationality.

No.	Pos.	Nation	Player
—	DF	FRA	Daniel Frey (at Carrarese until 30 June 2023)
—	DF	SEN	Maissa Ndiaye (at Vicenza until 30 June 2023)
—	DF	ITA	Luca Ravanelli (at Frosinone until 30 June 2023)
—	MF	ITA	Francesco Cerretelli (at Carrarese until 30 June 2023)
—	MF	ITA	Matteo Ghisolfi (at Giugliano until 30 June 2023)
—	MF	ITA	Stefano Girelli (at Lecco until 30 June 2023)
—	MF	ITA	Tommaso Milanese (at Venezia until 30 June 2023)
—	MF	ITA	Filippo Nardi (at Reggiana until 30 June 2023)

No.	Pos.	Nation	Player
—	MF	ITA	Fausto Perseu (at Alessandria until 30 June 2023)
—	MF	ROU	Dennis Politic (at Port Vale until 30 June 2023)
—	MF	ITA	Joshua Tenkorang (at Virtus Entella until 30 June 2023)
—	MF	ITA	Luca Valzania (at SPAL until 30 June 2023)
—	FW	CIV	Cedric Gondo (at Ascoli until 30 June 2023)
—	FW	ITA	Luca Strizzolo (at Modena until 30 June 2023)
—	FW	ITA	Luca Zanimacchia (at Parma until 30 June 2023)
—	FW	ITA	Marco Zunno (at Piacenza until 30 June 2023)

== Pre-season and friendlies ==
Win Draw Loss Fixtures

9 July 2022 Friendly	Cremonese (Italy)	8–0	(Italy) Falco Albino	Cremona
10:00 CEST (UTC+2)	Di Carmine; Báez; Tenkorang; Milanese; Strizzolo	Report		Stadium: Centro Sportivo Giovanni Arvedi; Attendance: 300; Referee: Gianmarco Vailati

13 July 2022 Friendly	Cremonese (Italy)	5–1	(Switzerland) FC Paradiso	Cremona
18:00 CEST (UTC+2)		Report		Stadium: Centro Sportivo Giovanni Arvedi; Referee: Niccolo Turrini

17 July 2022 Friendly	Cremonese (Italy)	5–0	(Italy) Fiorenzuola	Cremona
18:00 CEST (UTC+2)		Report		Stadium: Centro Sportivo Giovanni Arvedi; Attendance: 750; Referee: Michele Delrio

24 July 2022 Friendly	Cremonese (Italy)	2–0	(Italy) SPAL	Dimaro
16:30 CEST (UTC+2)	Valeri 48'; Báez 90' (pen.)	Report		Stadium: Stadio Comunale; Referee: Daniele Minelli

30 July 2022 Friendly	Hellas Verona (Italy)	4–3	(Italy) Cremonese	Rovereto
18:00 CEST (UTC+2)	Henry 19'; Lasagna 23', 58'; Piccoli 90' (pen.)	Report	Tsadjout 42' (pen.); Valeri 56', 79'	Stadium: Stadio Quercia; Referee: Andrea Colombo

31 July 2022 Friendly	Cremonese (Italy)	3–1	(Italy) Crema	Cremona
10:30 CEST (UTC+2)		Report		Stadium: Campo Soldi; Referee: Daniele Minelli

5 August 2022 Friendly	Cremonese (Italy)	6–0	(Italy) Sant'Angelo	Cremona
18:00 CEST (UTC+2)				Stadium: Campo Soldi

23 December 2022 Friendly	Torino (Italy)	0–0	(Italy) Cremonese	Turin, Italy
14:30 CET (UTC+1)				Stadium: Stadio Olimpico Grande Torino

== Competitions ==
=== Overall record ===
Competition	First match	Last match	Starting round	Final position	Record							
Competition	First match	Last match	Starting round	Final position	Pld	W	D	L	GF	GA	GD	Win %
Serie A	14 August 2022	3 June 2023	Matchday 1	19th	38	5	12	21	36	69	−33	13.16
Coppa Italia	8 August 2022	27 April 2023	Round of 64	Semi-finals	6	3	2	1	11	9	+2	50.00
Total					44	8	14	22	47	78	−31	18.18

Source: Soccerway

=== Serie A ===
==== League table ====
Pos	Team	Pld	W	D	L	GF	GA	GD	Pts	Qualification or relegation
16	Lecce	38	8	12	18	33	46	−13	36	
17	Spezia (R)	38	6	13	19	31	62	−31	31 (Note: Head-to-head points: Spezia 4 Hellas Verona 1)	Qualification for the Relegation tie-breaker (Note: Should the first and second, or 17th and 18th-placed teams at the end of the season be tied on points, a play-off tiebreaker match was held at a neutral site to determine the title and final team relegated respectively.)
18	Hellas Verona (O)	38	7	10	21	31	59	−28	31	Qualification for the Relegation tie-breaker
19	Cremonese (R)	38	5	12	21	36	69	−33	27	Relegation to Serie B
20	Sampdoria (R)	38	3	10	25	24	71	−47	19	Relegation to Serie B

Source: Serie A
Rules for classification: 1) Points; 2) Tiebreaker for Champions team and third relegated team; 3) Head-to-head points; 4) Head-to-head goal difference; 5) Goal difference; 6) Goals scored; 7) Draw. (Note: Head-to-head record is used only after all the matches between the teams in question have been played)
(O) Play-off winners; (R) Relegated

==== Results summary ====
Overall								Home						Away					
Pld	W	D	L	GF	GA	GD	Pts	W	D	L	GF	GA	GD	W	D	L	GF	GA	GD
38	5	12	21	36	69	−33	27	4	4	11	15	31	−16	1	8	10	21	38	−17

Source: Serie A

==== Results by round ====
Round	1	2	3	4	5	6	7	8	9	10	11	12	13	14	15	16	17	18	19	20	21	22	23	24	25	26	27	28	29	30	31	32	33	34	35	36	37	38
Ground	A	A	H	A	H	A	H	A	H	A	H	H	A	H	A	H	A	H	A	H	H	A	A	H	A	H	A	H	A	H	A	H	A	H	A	H	A	H
Result	L	L	L	L	D	D	L	D	L	D	L	D	D	D	L	L	L	L	D	L	L	L	D	W	L	L	D	L	W	W	L	D	D	W	L	L	L	W
Position	11	18	19	19	19	18	19	19	19	19	20	20	18	18	18	19	20	20	20	20	20	20	20	19	19	19	20	20	19	19	19	19	19	19	19	19	19	19
Points	0	0	0	0	1	2	2	3	3	4	4	5	6	7	7	7	7	7	8	8	8	8	9	12	12	12	13	13	16	19	19	20	21	24	24	24	24	27

Source: Serie A
A = Away; H = Home; W = Win; D = Draw; L = Loss

==== Matches ====
The league fixtures were announced on 24 June 2022.

14 August 2022 1	Fiorentina	3–2	Cremonese	Florence
18:30 CEST (UTC+2)	Bonaventura 16'; Jović 34'; Mandragora 90+5'	Report	Chiricheș (yellow card) 9'; Okereke 19', (yellow card) 82'; Escalante (red card) 44'; Ghiglione (yellow card) 62'; Bianchetti 68'	Stadium: Stadio Artemio Franchi; Attendance: 34,461; Referee: Juan Luca Sacchi

22 August 2022 2	Roma	1–0	Cremonese	Rome
18:30 CEST (UTC+2)	Smalling 65'	Report	Aiwu (yellow card) 24'; Zanimacchia (yellow card) 50'; Bianchetti (yellow card) 79'	Stadium: Stadio Olimpico; Attendance: 60,859; Referee: Luca Massimi

27 August 2022 3	Cremonese	1–2	Torino	Cremona
18:30 CEST (UTC+2)	Sernicola 80'	Report	Vlašić 18'; Aina (yellow card) 54'; Buongiorno (yellow card) 64'; Radonjić 65'; Linetty (yellow card) 81'	Stadium: Stadio Giovanni Zini; Attendance: 11,572; Referee: Paolo Valeri

30 August 2022 4	Internazionale	3–1	Cremonese	Milan
20:45 CEST (UTC+2)	Correa 12'; Barella 38'; Martínez 76'	Report	Dessers (yellow card) 50'; Aiwu (yellow card) 66'; Vásquez (yellow card) 79'; Okereke 90'	Stadium: San Siro; Attendance: 70,750; Referee: Francesco Fourneau

4 September 2022 5	Cremonese	0–0	Sassuolo	Cremona
12:30 CEST (UTC+2)	Tsadjout (yellow card) 78'	Report	Thorstvedt (yellow card) 47'	Stadium: Stadio Giovanni Zini; Attendance: 9,105; Referee: Luca Pairetto

11 September 2022 6	Atalanta	1–1	Cremonese	Bergamo
12:30 CEST (UTC+2)	Okoli (yellow card) 65'; Demiral 74', (yellow card) 90+3'; Éderson (yellow card) 90+3'	Report	Sernicola (yellow card) 58'; Lochoshvili (yellow card) 62'; Pickel (yellow card) 66'; Ascacíbar (yellow card) 71'; Valeri 78'; Afena-Gyan (yellow card) 82'	Stadium: Gewiss Stadium; Attendance: 18,252; Referee: Andrea Colombo

18 September 2022 7	Cremonese	0–4	Lazio	Cremona
15:00 CEST (UTC+2)	Vásquez (yellow card) 74'	Report	Immobile 7', 21' (pen.); Casale (yellow card) 38'; Milinković-Savić 45+2'; Pedro 79'	Stadium: Stadio Giovanni Zini; Attendance: 12,991; Referee: Daniele Orsato

2 October 2022 8	Lecce	1–1	Cremonese	Lecce
15:00 CEST (UTC+2)	Falcone (yellow card) 18'; Strefezza 42' (pen.); Askildsen (yellow card) 53'; Pezzella (yellow card) 78'	Report	Ciofani 19' (pen.); Okereke (yellow card) 40'	Stadium: Stadio Via del mare Attendance: 23,377; Referee: Livio Marinelli

9 October 2022 9	Cremonese	1–4	Napoli	Cremona
18:00 CEST (UTC+2)	Zanimacchia (yellow card) 17'; Dessers 47'; Sernicola (yellow card) 69'	Report	Politano 26' (pen.); Simeone 76'; Lozano 90+3'; Olivera 90+5'	Stadium: Stadio Giovanni Zini; Attendance: 14,238; Referee: Rosario Abisso

16 October 2022 10	Spezia	2–2	Cremonese	La Spezia
15:00 CEST (UTC+2)	Nzola 19'; Holm 22'; Agudelo (yellow card) 61'; Caldara (yellow card) 89'	Report	Dessers 2'; Pickel 52'	Stadium: Stadio Alberto Picco; Attendance: 8,400; Referee: Gianluca Manganiello

24 October 2022 11	Cremonese	0–1	Sampdoria	Cremona
18:30 CEST (UTC+2)	Dessers (penalty missed) 7'; Sernicola (yellow card) 67'; Pickel (yellow card) 70'; Meite (yellow card) 74'	Report	Colley (yellow card) 7', (goal) 78'; Sabiri (yellow card) 30'; Amione (yellow card) 59'; Gabbiadini (yellow card) 74'	Stadium: Stadio Giovanni Zini; Attendance: 13,021; Referee: Fabio Maresca

30 October 2022 12	Cremonese	0–0	Udinese	Cremona
15:00 CET (UTC+1)	Meïté (yellow card) 4'	Report		Stadium: Stadio Giovanni Zini; Attendance: 12,810; Referee: Massimiliano Irrati

5 November 2022 13	Salernitana	2–2	Cremonese	Salerno
15:00 CET (UTC+1)	Piątek 3'; Fazio (yellow card) 8'; Coulibaly 38'; Sepe (yellow card) 90'	Report	Okereke 12'; Hendry (yellow card) 40'; Sernicola (yellow card) 44'; Ciofani (penalty missed) 89', 89'	Stadium: Stadio Arechi; Attendance: 16,780; Referee: Matteo Marchetti

8 November 2022 14	Cremonese	0–0	Milan	Cremona
20:45 CET (UTC+1)	Ghiglione (yellow card) 47'; Vásquez (yellow card) 67'; Valeri (yellow card) 85'; Meïté (yellow card) 87'	Report	Leão (yellow card) 78'; Lazetić (yellow card) 87'; De Ketelaere (yellow card) 90+3'	Stadium: Stadio Giovanni Zini; Attendance: 14,758; Referee: Antonio Rapuano

11 November 2022 15	Empoli	2–0	Cremonese	Empoli
20:45 CET (UTC+1)	Cambiaghi 46', (yellow card) 69'; Parisi 88'	Report	Meïté (yellow card) 43'; Pickel (yellow card) 90'	Stadium: Stadio Carlo Castellani; Attendance: 8,077; Referee: Federico Dionisi

4 January 2023 16	Cremonese	0–1	Juventus	Cremona
18:30 CET (UTC+1)	Ferrari (yellow card) 55'; Dessers (yellow card) 67'; Meïté (yellow card) 70'; Valeri (yellow card) 89'; Lochoshvili (yellow card) 90+3'	Report	Rabiot (yellow card) 71'; Bremer (yellow card) 72'; Milik 90+1'; Kean (yellow card) 90+5'	Stadium: Stadio Giovanni Zini; Attendance: 14,896; Referee: Giovanni Ayroldi

9 January 2023 17	Hellas Verona	2–0	Cremonese	Verona
18:30 CET (UTC+1)	Lazović 9', 26'; Kallon (yellow card) 23'; Đurić (yellow card) 63'; Verdi (yellow card) 88'	Report	Castagnetti (yellow card) 32'; Sernicola (yellow card) 54'; Lochoshvili (yellow card) 73'; Okereke (yellow card) 90'	Stadium: Stadio Marcantonio Bentegodi; Attendance: 3,804; Referee: Maurizio Mariani

14 January 2023 18	Cremonese	2–3	Monza	Cremona
15:00 CET (UTC+1)	Okereke (yellow card) 14'; Ciofani 67'; Pickel (yellow card) 70'; Dessers 83'	Report	Ciurria 8'; Caprari 19' (pen.), 55', (yellow card) 22'; Carlos Augusto (yellow card) 70'; D'Alessandro (yellow card) 79'	Stadium: Stadio Giovanni Zini; Attendance: 11,467; Referee: Davide Massa

23 January 2023 19	Bologna	1–1	Cremonese	Bologna
18:30 CET (UTC+1)	Chiricheș 55' (o.g.); Soumaoro (yellow card) 67'; Skorupski (yellow card) 82'	Report	Chiricheș (yellow card) 24'; Okereke 50' (pen.); Pickel (yellow card) 84'; Vásquez (yellow card) 86'; Carnesecchi (yellow card) 87'; Buonaiuto (yellow card) 90+1'	Stadium: Stadio Renato Dall'Ara; Attendance: 15,587; Referee: Matteo Marchetti

28 January 2023 20	Cremonese	1–2	Internazionale	Cremona
18:00 CET (UTC+1)	Okereke 11'	Report	Martínez 21', 65'; Acerbi (yellow card) 29'; Çalhanoğlu (yellow card) 38'	Stadium: Stadio Giovanni Zini; Attendance: 14,554; Referee: Maurizio Mariani

4 February 2023 21	Cremonese	0–2	Lecce	Cremona
15:00 CET (UTC+1)	Pickel (yellow card) 45+3'	Report	Baschirotto 58'; Strefezza 69'; Colombo (yellow card) 76'; Askildsen (yellow card) 89'	Stadium: Stadio Giovanni Zini; Attendance: 11,189; Referee: Daniele Orsato

12 February 2023 22	Napoli	3–0	Cremonese	Naples
20:45 CET (UTC+1)	Kvaratskhelia 21'; Osimhen 65'; Elmas 79'	Report	Vásquez (yellow card) 13'; Aiwu (yellow card) 74'	Stadium: Stadio Diego Armando Maradona; Attendance: 50,250; Referee: Luca Massimi

20 February 2023 23	Torino	2–2	Cremonese	Turin
20:45 CET (UTC+1)	Sanabria 41' (pen.), (yellow card) 75'; Aina (yellow card) 66'; Singo 79'; Vojova (yellow card) 90+2'	Report	Tsadjout 54'; Valeri 75'; Buonaiuto (yellow card) 90+4'	Stadium: Stadio Olimpico Grande Torino; Attendance: 19,095; Referee: Giacomo Camplone

28 February 2023 24	Cremonese	2–1	Roma	Cremona
18:30 CET (UTC+1)	Ferrari (yellow card) 12'; Tsadjout 17'; Bianchetti (yellow card) 52'; Sernicola (yellow card) 58'; Ciofani 83' (pen.)	Report	Spinazzola 71'; El Shaarawy (yellow card) 74'; Ibañez (yellow card) 84'	Stadium: Stadio Giovanni Zini; Attendance: 11,367; Referee: Marco Piccinini

6 March 2023 25	Sassuolo	3–2	Cremonese	Reggio Emilia
18:30 CET (UTC+1)	Laurienté 26'; Frattesi 41'; Zortea (yellow card) 52'; Bajrami 90+2'	Report	Afena-Gyan (yellow card) 44'; Dessers 62', 83'; Vásquez (yellow card) 87'; Pickel (yellow card) 90+7'; Benassi (yellow card) 90+7'	Stadium: Mapei Stadium; Attendance: 11,587; Referee: Francesco Fourneau

12 March 2023 26	Cremonese	0–2	Fiorentina	Cremona
15:00 CET (UTC+1)	Ferrari (yellow card) 52'	Report	Mandragora 27', (yellow card) 55'; Cabral 50'; Brekalo (yellow card) 60'	Stadium: Stadio Giovanni Zini; Attendance: 11,506; Referee: Matteo Mercenaro

18 March 2023 27	Monza	1–1	Cremonese	Monza
15:00 CET (UTC+1)	Pessina (yellow card) 25'; Izzo (yellow card) 45+1'; Carlos Augusto 69'; Antov (yellow card) 90+5'	Report	Sernicola (yellow card) 43'; Ciofani 61'; Dessers (yellow card) 68'; Pickel (yellow card) 71'; Bianchetti (yellow card) 71'; Castagnetti (yellow card) 73'	Stadium: Stadio Brianteo; Attendance: 12,797; Referee: Antonio Giua

2 April 2023 28	Cremonese	1–3	Atalanta	Cremona
12:30 CEST (UTC+2)	Lochoshvili (yellow card) 21'; Ciofani 56' (pen.), (yellow card) 60'; Bianchetti (yellow card) 82'	Report	Pašalić (yellow card) 39'; De Roon 44'; Tolói (yellow card) 54'; Boga 72'; Lookman 90+3'	Stadium: Stadio Giovanni Zini; Attendance: 11,891; Referee: Livio Marinelli

8 April 2023 29	Sampdoria	2–3	Cremonese	Genoa
16:30 CEST (UTC+2)	Léris 15', (yellow card) 89'; Lammers 66'; Oikonomou (yellow card) 90+8'	Report	Ghiglione 35'; Bianchetti (yellow card) 37'; Lochoshvili 85'; Sernicola 90+5', (yellow card) 90+5'; Afena-Gyan (yellow card) 90+7'	Stadium: Stadio Luigi Ferraris; Attendance: 20,421; Referee: Daniele Doveri

14 April 2023 30	Cremonese	1–0	Empoli	Cremona
18:30 CEST (UTC+2)	Dessers 4'; Sernicola (yellow card) 15'	Report		Stadium: Stadio Giovanni Zini; Attendance: 8,966; Referee: Luca Zufferli

23 April 2023 31	Udinese	3–0	Cremonese	Udinese
15:00 CEST (UTC+2)	Samardžić 2', (yellow card) 47'; Pérez 27'; Success 36'; Arslan (yellow card) 78'	Report	Sernicola (yellow card) 26'; Afena-Gyan (yellow card) 64'; Valeri (yellow card) 87'	Stadium: Stadio Friuli; Attendance: 23,445; Referee: Francesco Fourneau

30 April 2023 32	Cremonese	1–1	Hellas Verona	Cremona
15:00 CEST (UTC+2)	Okereke 9'; Quagliata (red card) 62'	Report	Verdi 75'	Stadium: Stadio Giovanni Zini; Attendance: 11,645; Referee: Daniele Doveri

3 May 2023 33	Milan	1–1	Cremonese	Milan
21:00 CEST (UTC+2)	Messias 90+3'	Report	Okereke 77'; Galdames (yellow card) 84'; Vásquez (yellow card) 90+2'; Pickel (red card) 90+6'; Ghiglione (yellow card) 90+8'	Stadium: San Siro; Attendance: 68,136; Referee: Luca Pairetto

6 May 2023 34	Cremonese	2–0	Spezia	Cremona
20:45 CEST (UTC+2)	Ciofani 41'; Vásquez 77'	Report	Agudelo (yellow card) 76'; Ampadu (yellow card) 79'	Stadium: Stadio Giovanni Zini; Attendance: 10,260; Referee: Marco Guida

14 May 2023 35	Juventus	2–0	Cremonese	Turin
20:45 CEST (UTC+2)	Fagioli 55'; Cuadrado (yellow card) 63'; Danilo (yellow card) 66'; Bremer 79'	Report		Stadium: Juventus Stadium; Attendance: 39,439; Referee: Daniele Chiffi

20 May 2023 36	Cremonese	1–5	Bologna	Cremona
15:00 CEST (UTC+2)	Buonaiuto (yellow card) 86'; Ciofani 90+1'	Report	Arnautović 14'; Ferguson 27'; Orsolini (yellow card) 29' (yellow-red card) 73', (goal) 62'; Posch 45+1'; Sansone 80'	Stadium: Stadio Giovanni Zini; Attendance: 11,140; Referee: Paolo Valeri

28 May 2023 37	Lazio	3–2	Cremonese	Rome
18:00 CEST (UTC+2)	Hysaj 4'; Milinković-Savić 37', 89'; Zaccagni (yellow card) 72'; Pellegrini (yellow card) 81'	Report	Sernicola (yellow card) 24'; Galdames 54', (yellow card) 66'; Lazzari 58' (o.g.)	Stadium: Stadio Olimpico; Attendance: 64,171; Referee: Antonio Giua

3 June 2023 38	Cremonese	2–0	Salernitana	Cremona
21:00 CEST (UTC+2)	Buonaiuto 26' (pen.); Ghiglione (yellow card) 29'; Tsadjout 88'	Report	Coulibaly (yellow card) 39'; Piątek (yellow card) 87'	Stadium: Stadio Giovanni Zini; Attendance: 10,308; Referee: Daniele Perenzoni

=== Coppa Italia ===
8 August 2022 Round of 64	Cremonese	3–2	Ternana	Ferrara
21:00 CEST (UTC+2)	Bogdan 15' (o.g.); Okereke 22'; Chiricheș (yellow card) 45+1'; Sernicola (yellow card) 59'; Quagliata 60', (yellow card) 86'	Report	Di Tacchio (yellow card) 35'; Ghiringhelli (yellow card) 45'; Rovaglia 54'; Palumbo 57', (yellow card) 88'	Stadium: Stadio Paolo Mazza; Attendance: 541; Referee: Antonio Giua

20 October 2022 Round of 32	Cremonese	4–2 (a.e.t.)	Modena	Cremona
15:00 CEST (UTC+2)	Vásquez (yellow card) 50'; Okereke 77'; Afena-Gyan 84'; Buonaiuto (yellow card) 89'; Escalante (yellow card) 98'; Sernicola 111', 120'	Report	Magnino (yellow card) 9' (yellow-red card) 22'; De Maio (yellow card) 36'; Diaw 89' (pen.), 90'; Armellino (yellow card) 99'	Stadium: Stadio Giovanni Zini; Attendance: 2,772; Referee: Daniele Paterna

17 January 2023 Round of 16	Napoli	2–2 (a.e.t.) (4–5 p)	Cremonese	Naples
21:00 CET (UTC+1)	Juan Jesus 33', (yellow card) 90+2'; Simeone 36'; Zerbin (yellow card) 61'	Report	Pickel 18'; Vásquez (yellow card) 29'; Okereke (yellow card) 45+5'; Quagliata (yellow card) 59'; Afena-Gyan 87'; Meïté (yellow card) 90+3'; Sernicola (yellow card) 90+7' (yellow-red card) 100'; Valeri (yellow card) 93'	Stadium: Stadio Diego Armando Maradona; Attendance: 32,000; Referee: Maria Sole Ferrieri Caputi
	Penalties
	Politano (penalty scored); Simeone (penalty scored); Zieliński (penalty scored); Lobotka (penalty missed); Osimhen (penalty scored)		(penalty scored) Vásquez; (penalty scored) Buonaiuto; (penalty scored) Tsadjout; (penalty scored) Valeri; (penalty scored) Afena-Gyan

1 February 2023 Quarter-finals	Roma	1–2	Cremonese	Rome
21:00 CET (UTC+1)	Patrício (yellow card) 27'; Mancini (yellow card) 29'; Belotti 90+4'	Report	Dessers 28' (pen.), (yellow card) 29'; Çelik 49' (o.g.); Aiwu (yellow card) 60'; Ferrari (yellow card) 62'; Sarr (yellow card) 81'	Stadium: Stadio Olimpico; Attendance: 60,657; Referee: Michael Fabbri

5 April 2023 Semi-finals; First leg	Cremonese	0–2	Fiorentina	Cremona
21:00 CEST (UTC+2)	Aiwu (red card) 73'	Report	Cabral 20'; Martínez Quarta (yellow card) 39'; González 75' (pen.)	Stadium: Stadio Giovanni Zini; Attendance: 13,952; Referee: Maurizio Mariani

27 April 2023 Semi-finals; Second leg	Fiorentina	0–0 (2–0 agg.)	Cremonese	Florence
21:00 CEST (UTC+2)	Dodô (yellow card) 39'; Igor (yellow card) 59'	Report	Ghiglione (yellow card) 21'; Sernicola (yellow card) 82'	Stadium: Stadio Artemio Franchi; Attendance: 31,131; Referee: Livio Marinelli
