= 2024–25 US Cremonese season =

Cremonese
2024–25 season
- Manager: Giovanni Stroppa (until 8 October); Eugenio Corini (9 October–11 November); Giovanni Stroppa (from 11 November)
- Stadium: Stadio Giovanni Zini
- Serie B: 4th
- Promotion play-offs: Winners
- Coppa Italia: Second round
- Top goalscorer: League: Franco Vázquez (9); All: Franco Vázquez (9)

The 2024–25 season was the 122nd in the history of US Cremonese and the club's second consecutive season in Serie B, the second division of Italian football. Cremonese also took part in the 2024–25 Coppa Italia.

After the eighth round of the league season, with only three wins and the team outside the automatic promotion places to Serie A, Cremonese dismissed head coach Giovanni Stroppa on 8 October. Eugenio Corini was appointed as his replacement but was dismissed approximately a month later after the team registered two wins in five matches, including a loss to Mantova. The club then decided to reinstate Stroppa as head coach.

== Transfers ==
=== In ===
| Pos. | Player | Transferred from | Fee | Date | Source |
|---|---|---|---|---|---|
| FW | (Italy) Marco Nasti | (Italy) AC Milan | | 20 August 2024 | |
| DF | (Italy) Francesco Folino | (Italy) Juve Stabia | | 24 January 2025 | |
| MF | (Italy) Salvatore Dore | (Italy) Lecco | Loan return | 28 January 2025 | |
| MF | (Italy) Francesco Gelli | (Italy) Frosinone | Loan | 3 February 2025 | |
| MF | (Italy) Mattia Valoti | (Italy) Monza | | 3 February 2025 | |
| GK | (Sweden) Jakob Tånnander | (Sweden) Sirius | | 18 February 2025 | |

=== Out ===
| Pos. | Player | Transferred from | Fee | Date | Source |
|---|---|---|---|---|---|
| MF | (Italy) Leonardo Sernicola | (Italy) Pisa | Loan | 23 January 2025 | |
| MF | (Italy) Salvatore Dore | (Italy) Legnago Salus | Loan | 29 January 2025 | |
| MF | (Italy) Cristian Buonaiuto | (Italy) Padova | | 1 February 2025 | |
| MF | (Italy) Tommaso Milanese | (Italy) Carrarese | Loan | 3 February 2025 | |

== Competitions ==
=== Overall record ===
| Competition | First match | Last match | Starting round | Final position | Record | | | | | | | |
| Competition | First match | Last match | Starting round | Final position | Pld | W | D | L | GF | GA | GD | Win % |
|---|---|---|---|---|---|---|---|---|---|---|---|---|
| Serie B | 18 August 2024 | 13 May 2025 | Matchday 1 | 4th | 38 | 16 | 13 | 9 | 62 | 44 | +18 | 42.11 |
| Promotion play-offs | 21 May 2025 | 1 June 2025 | Semi-finals | Winners | 4 | 2 | 1 | 1 | 7 | 4 | +3 | 50.00 |
| Coppa Italia | 10 August 2024 | 24 September 2024 | First round | Second round | 2 | 0 | 1 | 1 | 1 | 2 | −1 | 0.00 |
| Total | | | | | 44 | 18 | 15 | 11 | 70 | 50 | +20 | 40.91 |

Source: Competitions

=== Serie B ===
==== League table ====
| Pos | Team | Pld | W | D | L | GF | GA | GD | Pts | Promotion, qualification or relegation |
|---|---|---|---|---|---|---|---|---|---|---|
| 2 | Pisa (P) | 38 | 23 | 7 | 8 | 64 | 35 | +29 | 76 | Promotion to Serie A |
| 3 | Spezia | 38 | 17 | 15 | 6 | 59 | 33 | +26 | 66 | Qualification for promotion play-offs semi-finals |
| 4 | Cremonese (O, P) | 38 | 16 | 13 | 9 | 62 | 44 | +18 | 61 | Qualification for promotion play-offs semi-finals |
| 5 | Juve Stabia | 38 | 14 | 13 | 11 | 42 | 41 | +1 | 55 | Qualification for promotion play-offs preliminary round |
| 6 | Catanzaro | 38 | 11 | 20 | 7 | 51 | 45 | +6 | 53 | Qualification for promotion play-offs preliminary round |

Source: Serie BKT
Rules for classification: 1) Points; 2) Head-to-head points; 3) Head-to-head goal difference; 4) Goal difference; 5) Goals scored; 6) Draw.
(Note: Head-to-head record is used only after all the matches between the teams in question have been played)
(O) Play-off winners; (P) Promoted

==== Results by round ====
| Round | 1 | 2 | 3 | 4 | 5 | 6 | 7 | 8 | 9 | 10 | 11 | 12 | 13 | 14 | 15 | 16 | 17 | 18 | 19 | 20 | 21 | 22 | 23 | 24 | 25 | 26 | 27 | 28 | 29 | 30 | 31 | 32 | 33 | 34 | 35 | 36 | 37 | 38 |
|---|---|---|---|---|---|---|---|---|---|---|---|---|---|---|---|---|---|---|---|---|---|---|---|---|---|---|---|---|---|---|---|---|---|---|---|---|---|---|
| Ground | A | H | H | A | H | A | A | H | A | H | A | H | A | H | A | H | A | H | A | H | A | H | H | A | H | A | H | A | H | A | H | A | H | A | H | A | H | A |
| Result | L | W | L | W | D | W | L | D | W | W | D | L | L | W | W | L | D | D | W | D | W | W | D | L | W | D | L | D | W | W | D | W | D | L | W | D | D | W |
| Position | 17 | 12 | 12 | 6 | 7 | 4 | 8 | 7 | 4 | 4 | 4 | 5 | 5 | 5 | 4 | 5 | 4 | 5 | 4 | 4 | 4 | 4 | 4 | 4 | 4 | 4 | 5 | 5 | 4 | 4 | 4 | 4 | 4 | 4 | 4 | 4 | 4 | 4 |

A = Away; H = Home; W = Win; D = Draw; L = Loss

==== Matches ====
| 18 August 2024 1 | Cosenza | 1–0 | Cremonese |

| 24 August 2024 2 | Cremonese | 1–0 | Carrarese |

| 27 August 2024 3 | Cremonese | 0–1 | Palermo |

| 31 August 2024 4 | Sassuolo | 1–4 | Cremonese |

| 14 September 2024 5 | Cremonese | 1–1 | Spezia |

| 20 September 2024 6 | Catanzaro | 1–2 | Cremonese |

| 30 September 2024 7 | Brescia | 3–2 | Cremonese |

| 6 October 2024 8 | Cremonese | 1–1 | Bari |

| 20 October 2024 9 | Juve Stabia | 1–2 | Cremonese |

| 26 October 2024 10 | Cremonese | 2–1 | Salernitana |

| 29 October 2024 11 | Modena | 2–2 | Cremonese |

| 3 November 2024 12 | Cremonese | 1–3 | Pisa |

| 9 November 2024 13 | Mantova | 1–0 | Cremonese |

| 24 November 2024 14 | Cremonese | 1–0 | Frosinone |

| 30 November 2024 15 | Südtirol | 0–4 | Cremonese |

| 8 December 2024 16 | Cremonese | 0–2 | Reggiana |

| 15 December 2024 17 | Cittadella | 0–0 | Cremonese |

| 22 December 2024 18 | Cremonese | 1–1 | Sampdoria |

| 26 December 2024 19 | Cesena | 0–1 | Cremonese |

| 29 December 2024 20 | Cremonese | 1–1 | Brescia |

| 12 January 2025 21 | Frosinone | 0–3 | Cremonese |

| 18 January 2025 22 | Cremonese | 3–1 | Cosenza |

| 26 January 2025 23 | Cremonese | 2–2 | Modena |

| 2 February 2025 24 | Salernitana | 1–0 | Cremonese |

| 8 February 2025 25 | Cremonese | 3–1 | Südtirol |

| 15 February 2025 26 | Bari | 1–1 | Cremonese |

| 22 February 2025 27 | Cremonese | 1–2 | Cesena |

| 1 March 2025 28 | Carrarese | 2–2 | Cremonese |

| 8 March 2025 29 | Cremonese | 4–0 | Catanzaro |

| 14 March 2025 30 | Palermo | 2–3 | Cremonese |

| 29 March 2025 31 | Cremonese | 2–2 | Cittadella |

| 4 April 2025 32 | Reggiana | 1–2 | Cremonese |

| 13 April 2025 33 | Cremonese | 1–1 | Juve Stabia |

| 25 April 2025 35 | Cremonese | 4–2 | Mantova |

| 1 May 2025 36 | Sampdoria | 0–0 | Cremonese |

| 4 May 2025 37 | Cremonese | 1–1 | Sassuolo |

| 9 May 2025 38 | Spezia | 2–3 | Cremonese |

| 13 May 2025 34 | Pisa | 2–1 | Cremonese |

==== Promotion play-offs ====
| 21 May 2025 Semi-finals; First leg | Juve Stabia | 2–1 | Cremonese | Castellammare di Stabia |
| | | | | Stadium: Stadio Romeo Menti |

| 25 May 2025 Semi-finals; Second leg | Cremonese | 3–0 (4–2 agg.) | Juve Stabia | Cremona |

| 29 May 2025 Finals; First leg | Cremonese | 0–0 | Spezia | Cremona |
| 20:30 |

| 1 June 2025 Second leg | Spezia | 2–3 (2–3 agg.) | Cremonese | La Spezia |
| 20:30 |

=== Coppa Italia ===
| 10 August 2024 First round | Cremonese | 1–1 (5–4 p) | Bari | Cremona |
| 18:00 | De Luca 68' | Report | Manzari 80' | Stadium: Stadio Giovanni Zini; Referee: Simone Galipò |

| 24 September 2024 Second round | Cagliari | 1–0 | Cremonese | Cagliari |
| 18:30 | Lapadula 60' | Report | | Stadium: Unipol Domus; Referee: Kevin Bonacina |
