= Folino =

Folino is an Italian surname. Notable people with the surname include:

- Francesco Folino (born 2002), Italian footballer
- Talia Folino (born 2001), Australian gymnast
