= Gonzalo Abrego =

Argentine professional footballer

Personal information
- Full name: Gonzalo Damián Abrego Federicci
- Date of birth: 7 January 2000 (age 26)
- Place of birth: Maipú, Argentina
- Height: 1.84 m (6 ft 0 in)
- Position: Midfielder

Team information
- Current team: San Lorenzo (on loan from Godoy Cruz)
- Number: 26

Youth career
- Deportivo Maipú
- 2014–2020: Godoy Cruz

Senior career*
| Years | Team | Apps | (Gls) |
| 2020– | Godoy Cruz | 145 | (9) |
| 2023–2024 | → Cremonese (loan) | 23 | (1) |
| 2026– | → San Lorenzo (loan) | 12 | (0) |
- * Club domestic league appearances and goals as of 18:06, 21 November 2026 (UTC)

Gonzalo Damián Abrego (born 7 January 2000) is an Argentine professional footballer who plays as a midfielder for San Lorenzo, on loan from Godoy Cruz.

== Career ==
Abrego joined the academy of Godoy Cruz at the age of fourteen, following a short spell with Deportivo Maipú. Diego Martínez promoted the central midfielder into the first-team in 2020, as he initially appeared as an unused substitute for Copa de la Liga Profesional defeats to River Plate and Rosario Central in early November. Abrego made his senior debut on 28 November in that aforementioned competition against Banfield, featuring for the full duration of a goalless draw.

On 10 August 2023, recently relegated to Serie B side Cremonese announced the signing of Abrego on a season-long loan, with a future option to make the move permanent.

== Career statistics ==
As of match played 31 July 2023

Appearances and goals by club, season and competition
| Club | Season | League | | | National Cup (Note: Includes Copa Argentina and Coppa Italia) | | League Cup (Note: Includes Copa de la Liga) | | Total | |
| Club | Season | Division | Apps | Goals | Apps | Goals | Apps | Goals | Apps | Goals |
|---|---|---|---|---|---|---|---|---|---|---|
| Godoy Cruz | 2020 | Argentine Primera División | 0 | 0 | 4 | 0 | 4 | 0 | 8 | 0 |
| Godoy Cruz | 2021 | Argentine Primera División | 21 | 1 | — | | 13 | 0 | 34 | 1 |
| Godoy Cruz | 2022 | Argentine Primera División | 24 | 2 | 3 | 0 | 14 | 0 | 41 | 2 |
| Godoy Cruz | 2023 | Argentine Primera División | 26 | 3 | 2 | 0 | — | | 28 | 3 |
| Godoy Cruz | Total | | 71 | 6 | 9 | 0 | 31 | 0 | 111 | 6 |
| Cremonese (loan) | 2023–24 | Serie B | 8 | 0 | 1 | 0 | — | | 9 | 0 |
| Career total | | | 79 | 6 | 10 | 0 | 31 | 0 | 120 | 6 |
