= Charles Pickel =

DR Congolese footballer (born 1997)

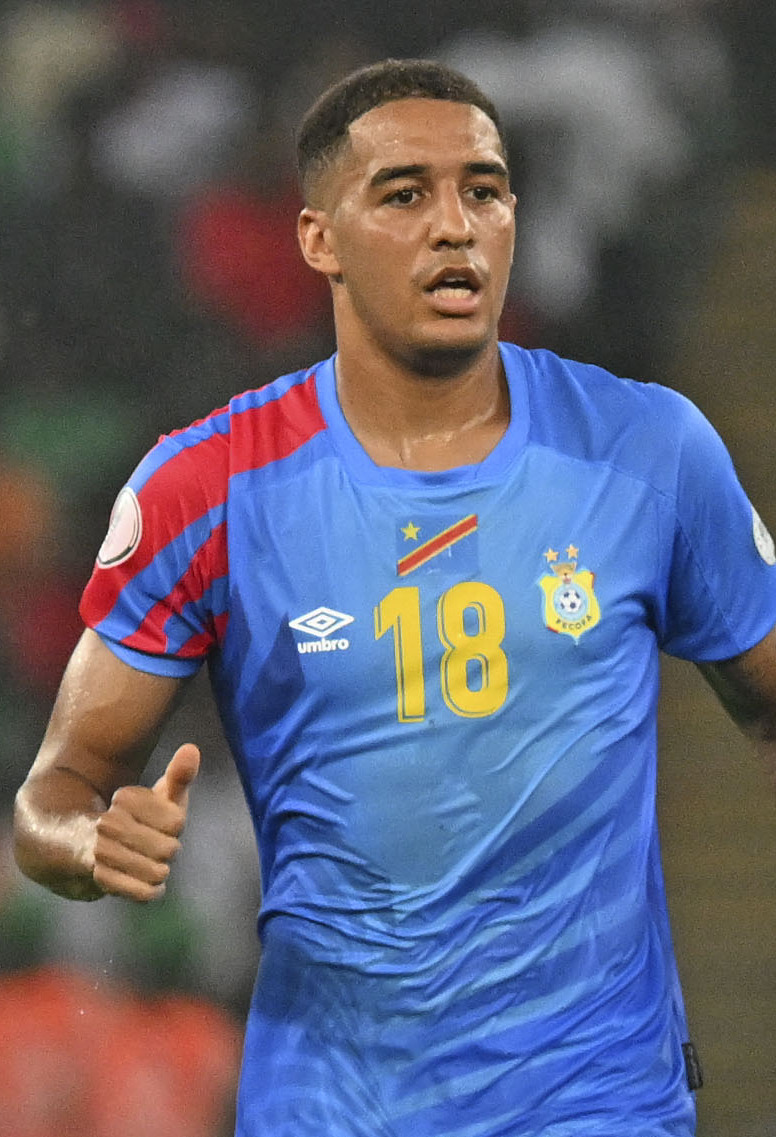
- Pickel playing for DR Congo at the 2023 Africa Cup of Nations

Personal information
- Full name: Charles Monginda Pickel
- Date of birth: 15 May 1997 (age 29)
- Place of birth: Solothurn, Switzerland
- Height: 1.85 m (6 ft 1 in)
- Position: Defensive midfielder

Team information
- Current team: Espanyol
- Number: 18

Youth career
- –2011: Solothurn
- 2011–2016: Basel

Senior career*
Years	Team	Apps	(Gls)
2015–2017	Basel U-21	38	(3)
2016–2017	Basel	3	(0)
2017–2019	Grasshoppers	20	(0)
2018	→ FC Schaffhausen (loan)	14	(0)
2018–2019	→ Neuchâtel Xamax (loan)	26	(2)
2019–2021	Grenoble	64	(3)
2021–2022	Famalicão	29	(0)
2022–2025	Cremonese	91	(6)
2025–	Espanyol	24	(1)

International career^{‡}
2014–2015	Switzerland U18	6	(0)
2015–2016	Switzerland U19	4	(0)
2015–2018	Switzerland U20	10	(1)
2023–	DR Congo	36	(1)
- * Club domestic league appearances and goals as of 27 May 2026 ‡ National team caps and goals as of 24 June 2026

Charles Monginda Pickel (born 15 May 1997) is a professional footballer who plays as a defensive midfielder for La Liga club Espanyol. Born in Switzerland, he plays for the DR Congo national team.

== Club career ==
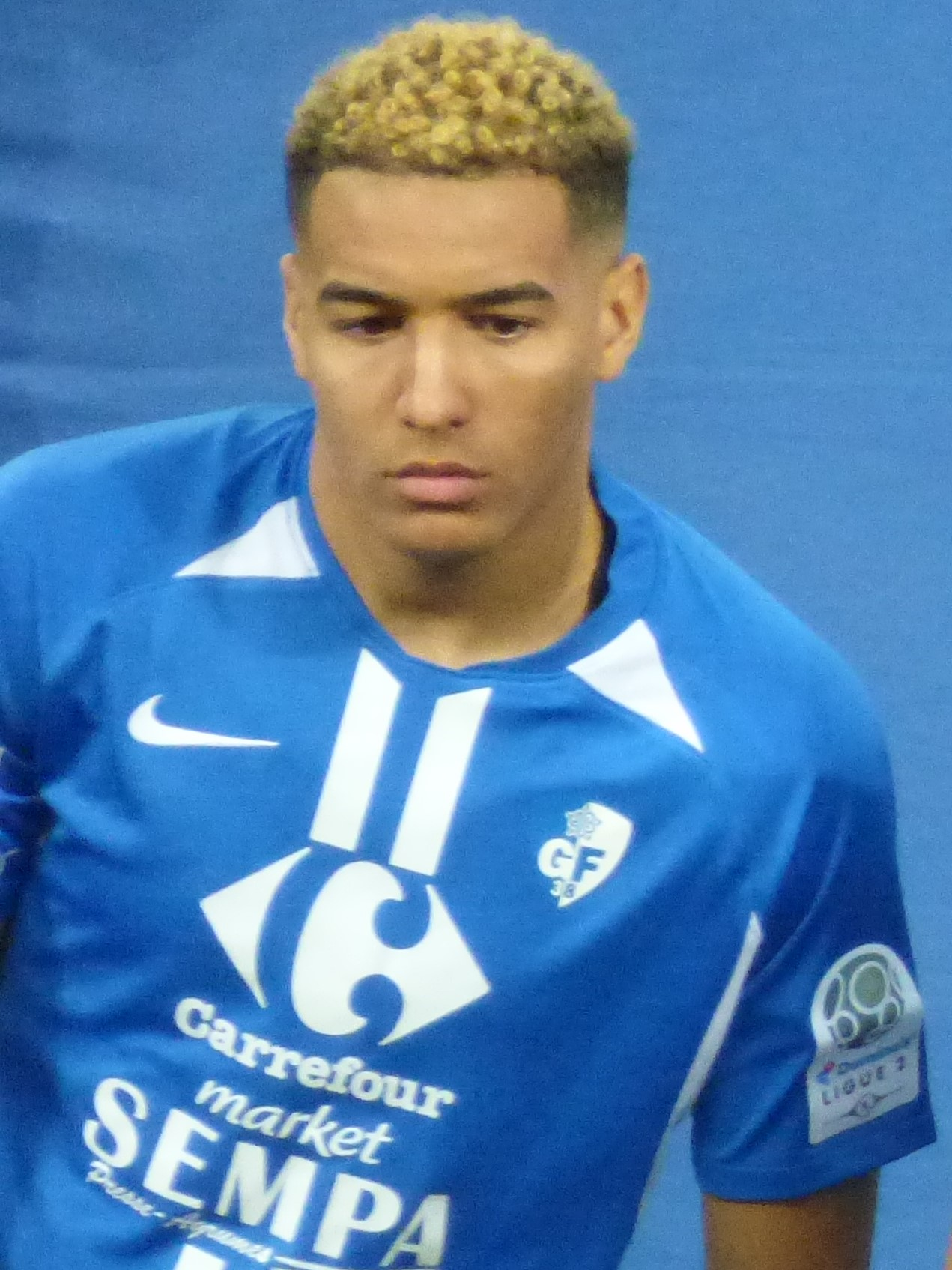
Pickel with Grenoble in 2020

Pickel started his youth football with FC Solothurn. In Summer 2011, he transferred to the youth department of FC Basel and played in their U-16 and advanced via their U-17 and U-18 team to their U-21 team in 2015. On 23 December 2015, he signed a two-and-a-half-year professional contract, but remained with the U-21 team. On 16 May 2016, Pickel was called up to the first team by head coach Urs Fischer. He played his Swiss Super League debut for the Basel first team in the starting eleven, but Basel suffered a 0–4 away defeat against Luzern. Basel won the Swiss Super League championship at the end of the 2015–16 Super League season. For the club it was the seventh title in a row and their 19th championship title in total.

Pickel joined Basel's first team definitively for their 2016–17 season under head coach Urs Fischer. Although he appeared in ten test matches, he played only one more league match, with the team in the home game in the St. Jakob-Park on 4 February 2017 as Basel won 4–0 against Lugano. Basel announced on 1 March that Pickel was leaving the club. With the U-21 Pickel had played 38 goals scoring three goals. During a short time with Basel's first team Pickel played a total of 13 games without scoring a goal. Three of these games were in the Swiss Super League and ten were friendly games.

On 1 March 2017, Basel announced that Pickel had signed for Grasshopper Club. GC announced that he had signed a four-and-a-half-year contract with them. Pickel played his debut for his new club on 5 March 2017 in the Swissporarena in the starting eleven against Luzern. He played the entire game and it ended in a 1–1 draw.

On 1 July 2019 GC announced that Pickel was transferring to Grenoble.

On 22 July 2022, it was announced that Pickel had joined newly promoted Serie A club Cremonese.

== International career ==
Born in Switzerland, Pickel is of Congolese and Swiss descent. Pickel played one international game for the Swiss U-15. He played his debut for the Swiss U-18 as midfielder on 2 September 2014 as they drew 2–2 with the Swedish U-18. He played his debut for the Swiss U-19 as defender on 1 September 2015 as they drew 1–1 with Portugal U-19. His last game for the Switzerland U-20 was on 27 March 2018 in the away game against Italy U-20, where Pickel played as right-back and the Swiss won 3–2.

Pickel was called up to the DR Congo national team for a set of 2023 Africa Cup of Nations qualification matches in September 2023. He debuted with them in a 2–0 win over Sudan on 9 September 2023, assisting his side's first goal.

On May 19, 2026, he was included in the 26-man squad selected by head coach Sébastien Desabre to represent the DR Congo at the 2026 FIFA World Cup.

== Career statistics ==
=== Club ===
As of match played 17 May 2026

Appearances and goals by club, season and competition
Club	Season	League			National cup (Note: Includes Swiss Cup, Coupe de France, Taça de Portugal, Coppa Italia, Copa del Rey)		League Cup		Europe		Other		Total	
Club	Season	Division	Apps	Goals	Apps	Goals	Apps	Goals	Apps	Goals	Apps	Goals	Apps	Goals
Basel U-21	2014–15	Swiss Promotion League	8	0	—		—		—		—		8	0
Basel U-21	2015–16	Swiss Promotion League	18	2	—		—		—		—		18	2
Basel U-21	2016–17	Swiss Promotion League	12	1	—		—		—		—		12	1
Basel U-21	Total		38	3	—		—		—		—		38	3
Basel	2015–16	Swiss Super League	2	0	—		—		—		—		2	0
Basel	2016–17	Swiss Super League	1	0	—		—		—		—		1	0
Basel	Total		3	0	—		—		—		—		3	0
Grasshoppers	2016–17	Swiss Super League	12	0	—		—		—		—		12	0
Grasshoppers	2017–18	Swiss Super League	7	0	2	0	—		—		—		9	0
Grasshoppers	2018–19	Swiss Super League	1	0	0	0	—		—		—		1	0
Grasshoppers	Total		20	0	2	0	—		—		—		22	0
FC Schaffhausen (loan)	2017–18	Swiss Challenge League	14	0	—		—		—		—		14	0
Neuchâtel Xamax (loan)	2018–19	Swiss Super League	26	2	2	0	—		—		2 (Note: Appearances in relegation/promotion play-offs)	0	30	2
Grenoble	2019–20	Ligue 2	26	1	1	0	1	0	—		—		28	0
Grenoble	2020–21	Ligue 2	35	1	2	0	—		—		2 (Note: Appearances in Ligue 1 relegation/promotion play-offs)	0	39	1
Grenoble	2021–22	Ligue 2	3	1	0	0	—		—		—		39	1
Grenoble	Total		64	3	3	0	1	0	—		—		68	3
Famalicão	2021–22	Primeira Liga	29	0	3	0	2	0	—		—		34	0
Cremonese	2022–23	Serie A	33	1	5	1	—		—		—		38	2
Cremonese	2023–24	Serie B	27	3	1	1	—		—		4 (Note: Appearances in Serie B play-offs)	0	32	4
Cremonese	2024–25	Serie B	31	2	1	0	—		—		2	0	34	2
Cremonese	Total		91	6	7	2	—		—		6	0	104	8
Espanyol	2025–26	La Liga	24	1	2	0	—		—		—		26	1
Career total			406	13	19	2	3	0	0	0	10	0	338	15

=== International ===
As of match played 23 June 2026

Appearances and goals by national team and year
National team	Year	Apps	Goals
DR Congo	2023	5	0
DR Congo	2024	15	0
DR Congo	2025	11	1
DR Congo	2026	5	0
Total		36	1

Scores and results list DR Congo's goal tally first, score column indicates score after each Pickel goal.

List of international goals scored by Charles Pickel
No.	Date	Venue	Opponent	Score	Result	Competition
1	25 March 2025	Nouadhibou Municipal Stadium, Nouadhibou, Mauritania	Mauritania	1–0	2–0	2026 FIFA World Cup qualification

== Honours ==
FC Basel

- Swiss Super League: 2015–16, 2016–17
