= David Okereke =

Nigerian footballer (born 1997)

Personal information
- Full name: David Chidozie Okereke
- Date of birth: 29 August 1997 (age 29)
- Place of birth: Lagos, Nigeria
- Height: 1.82 m (6 ft 0 in)
- Position: Forward

Team information
- Current team: Benevento
- Number: 29

Youth career
- Lavagnese
- 2016: Spezia

Senior career*
Years	Team	Apps	(Gls)
2016–2019	Spezia	54	(10)
2018	→ Cosenza (loan)	24	(4)
2019–2022	Club Brugge	51	(13)
2021–2022	→ Venezia (loan)	32	(7)
2022–2026	Cremonese	59	(11)
2024	→ Torino (loan)	9	(0)
2024–2025	→ Gaziantep (loan)	29	(9)
2026–	Benevento	0	(0)

International career^{‡}
2019	Nigeria U23	1	(1)
- * Club domestic league appearances and goals as of 22 August 2026 ‡ National team caps and goals as of 25 March 2019

David Chidozie Okereke (born 29 August 1997) is a Nigerian professional footballer who plays as a forward for Serie B club Benevento.

== Club career ==
=== Spezia ===
He made his professional debut in the Serie B for Spezia on 9 April 2016 in a game against Novara. In 2018–19 season, he scored 10 goals and 12 assists in 33 games.

=== Club Brugge ===
On 9 July 2019, he signed a four-year contract with Club Brugge.

==== Venezia (loan) ====
On 12 August 2021, Okereke joined newly promoted Serie A club Venezia on a season-long loan with an option to make the transfer permanent.

=== Cremonese ===
On 28 July 2022, Okereke joined Cremonese, on a three-year contract for a reported fee of €10 million.

==== Torino (loan) ====
On 1 February 2024, Okereke moved to Torino on loan with an option to buy.

== Personal life ==
On 15 September 2020 he tested positive for COVID-19.

== Career statistics ==
=== Club ===
As of match played 10 May 2026

Appearances and goals by club, season and competition
Club	Season	League			Cup		Continental		Other		Total	
Club	Season	Division	Apps	Goals	Apps	Goals	Apps	Goals	Apps	Goals	Apps	Goals
Lavagnese	2015–16	Serie D	3	1	–		–		—		3	1
Spezia	2015–16	Serie B	3	0	0	0	–		–		3	0
Spezia	2016–17	Serie B	14	0	3	1	–		–		17	1
Spezia	2017–18	Serie B	6	0	0	0	–		–		6	0
Spezia	2018–19	Serie B	31	10	2	0	–		–		33	10
Spezia	Total		54	10	5	1	0	0	0	0	59	11
Cosenza (loan)	2017–18	Serie C	24	4	2	1	–		–		26	5
Club Brugge	2019–20	Pro League	22	9	4	2	9	0	–		35	11
Club Brugge	2020–21	Pro League	28	4	2	0	5	0	–		35	4
Club Brugge	2021–22	Pro League	1	0	0	0	–		0	0	1	0
Club Brugge	Total		51	13	6	2	14	0	0	0	71	15
Venezia (loan)	2021–22	Serie A	32	7	1	0	–		–		33	7
Cremonese	2022–23	Serie A	33	7	5	2	–		–		38	9
Cremonese	2023–24	Serie B	17	2	2	0	—		—		19	2
Cremonese	2025–26	Serie A	9	2	1	0	—		—		10	2
Cremonese	Total		59	11	8	2	0	0	0	0	67	13
Torino (loan)	2023–24	Serie A	9	0	0	0	—		—		9	0
Gaziantep (loan)	2024–25	Süper Lig	29	9	1	0	—		—		30	9
Career total			261	55	23	6	14	0	0	0	298	61

== Honours ==
Club Brugge

- Belgian Pro League: 2019–20, 2020–21
- Belgian Super Cup: 2021
