= Fallou Sarr =

Senegalese footballer

Personal information
- Full name: Mouhamadou Fallou Mbacke Sarr
- Date of birth: 5 January 1997 (age 29)
- Place of birth: Kaolack, Senegal
- Height: 1.90 m (6 ft 3 in)
- Position: Goalkeeper

Youth career
- –2016: Barca Reno

Senior career*
Years	Team	Apps	(Gls)
2015–2021	Bologna	0	(0)
2017–2018	→ Prato (loan)	15	(0)
2018	→ Carrarese (loan)	0	(0)
2018–2019	→ Fano (loan)	24	(0)
2020–2021	→ Ascoli (loan)	3	(0)
2021–2025	Cremonese	17	(0)
2024–2025	→ Spezia (loan)	4	(0)
2025–2026	Spezia	6	(0)
- * Club domestic league appearances and goals as of 8 May 2026

Mouhamadou Fallou Mbacke Sarr (born 5 January 1997) is a Senegalese professional footballer who plays as a goalkeeper. He also holds Italian citizenship.

== Club career ==
Sarr made his Serie C debut for Prato on 4 October 2017 in a game against Carrarese.

On 6 July 2018, he went to Carrarese.

On 15 September 2020, Sarr joined Ascoli on loan until 30 June 2021.

On 27 August 2021, he went to Cremonese on permanent basis.

On 25 July 2024, Sarr joined Spezia on a season-long loan deal with an obligation to buy.

== Career statistics ==
=== Club ===
As of match played 1 September 2024

Appearances and goals by club, season and competition
Club	Season	League			National cup		Other		Total	
Club	Season	Division	Apps	Goals	Apps	Goals	Apps	Goals	Apps	Goals
Bologna	2014–15	Serie B	0	0	0	0	0	0	39	0
Bologna	2015–16	Serie A	0	0	0	0	—		0	0
Bologna	2016–17	Serie A	0	0	0	0	—		0	0
Bologna	2019–20	Serie A	0	0	0	0	—		0	0
Bologna	Total		0	0	0	0	0	0	255	0
Prato (loan)	2017–18	Serie C	15	0	2	0	—		17	0
Carrarese (loan)	2018–19	Serie C	0	0	1	0	—		1	0
Fano (loan)	2018–19	Serie C	24	0	0	0	—		24	0
Ascoli (loan)	2020–21	Serie B	3	0	1	0	—		4	0
Cremonese	2021–22	Serie B	3	0	0	0	—		3	0
Cremonese	2022–23	Serie A	2	0	4	0	—		6	0
Cremonese	2023–24	Serie B	12	0	1	0	0	0	13	0
Cremonese	Total		17	0	5	0	0	0	22	0
Spezia (loan)	2024–25	Serie B	4	0	1	0	0	0	5	0
Career total			63	0	10	0	0	0	73	0
