= Paolo Ghiglione =

Italian footballer

Personal information
- Date of birth: 2 February 1997 (age 29)
- Place of birth: Voghera, Italy
- Height: 1.91 m (6 ft 3 in)
- Position: Winger

Team information
- Current team: Salernitana

Youth career
- –2007: Derthona
- 2007–2012: AC Milan
- 2012: → Pavia (loan)
- 2012–2016: Genoa

Senior career*
Years	Team	Apps	(Gls)
2016–2022	Genoa	61	(0)
2016–2017	→ SPAL (loan)	7	(0)
2017–2018	→ Pro Vercelli (loan)	30	(1)
2018–2019	→ Frosinone (loan)	9	(1)
2022–2024	Cremonese	39	(3)
2024–	Salernitana	25	(2)
2025–2026	→ Padova (loan)	18	(0)

International career^{‡}
2015	Italy U18	1	(0)
2015–2016	Italy U19	17	(2)
2016–2018	Italy U20	14	(2)
Medal record
Men's football
Representing Italy
UEFA European Under-19 Championship
Runner-up	2016 Germany
- * Club domestic league appearances and goals as of 13 May 2026 ‡ National team caps and goals as of 25 April 2018

Paolo Ghiglione (born 2 February 1997) is an Italian professional footballer who plays as a right winger for Serie C Group C club Salernitana.

== Club career ==
=== Early career ===
Born in 1997, Ghiglione started his football career with Derthona, playing for their youth teams until 2007. In August 2007, he moved to the youth academy of AC Milan and he was loaned to Pavia for six months from January to June 2012. In August 2012, he finally transferred to the youth academy of Genoa.

=== Genoa ===
In 2015, Ghiglione was called up to the Genoa first team. He was named on the bench several times from 2015 to 2016, but he did not play any games.

==== SPAL (loan) ====
On 1 July 2016, SPAL announced that Ghiglione was loaned to them until the end of 2016/17 Season. On 5 November 2016, he made his professional league debut against Novara at Stadio Silvio Piola in the Serie B, starting the game and playing until he was substituted after 71 minutes.

=== Cremonese ===
On 17 July 2022, Ghiglione signed with Cremonese.

=== Salernitana ===
On 6 August 2024, Ghighlione joined Salernitana on a three-year contract.

On 14 July 2025, Ghighlione was loaned by Padova.

== International career ==
On 10 October 2015, Ghiglione was called up by and played for Italy U19s against Macedonia U17s. With the Under-19 side, he took part at the 2016 UEFA European Under-19 Championship, playing five games in the tournament, as Italy finished the competition as runners-up.

== Honours ==
Italy U19

- UEFA European Under-19 Championship runner-up: 2016

== Career statistics ==
=== Club ===
As of match played 8 April 2023

Appearances and goals by club, season and competition
Club	Season	League	League		Cup		Europe		Other		Total	
Club	Season	League	Apps	Goals	Apps	Goals	Apps	Goals	Apps	Goals	Apps	Goals
SPAL (loan)	2016–17	Serie B	7	0	1	0	–		–		8	0
Pro Vercelli (loan)	2017–18	Serie B	30	1	0	0	–		–		30	1
Frosinone (loan)	2018–19	Serie A	9	1	1	0	–		–		10	1
Genoa	2019–20	Serie A	25	0	2	1	–		–		27	1
Genoa	2020–21	Serie A	23	0	3	0	–		–		26	0
Genoa	2021–22	Serie A	13	0	2	0	–		–		15	0
Genoa	Total		61	0	7	1	0	0	0	0	68	1
Cremonese	2022–23	Serie A	15	1	4	0	–		–		19	1
Cremonese	2023–24	Serie B	24	2	2	0	–		2	0	28	2
Cremonese	Total		39	3	6	0	–		2	0	47	3
Career total			146	5	15	1	0	0	2	0	163	6
