= Emanuele Valeri =

Italian footballer (born 1998)

Personal information
- Date of birth: 7 December 1998 (age 27)
- Place of birth: Rome, Italy
- Height: 1.80 m (5 ft 11 in)
- Position: Defender

Team information
- Current team: Parma
- Number: 14

Senior career*
Years	Team	Apps	(Gls)
2015–2016	Urbetevere		
2015–2016	→ Atletico Vescovio (loan)		
2016–2017	Rieti	33	(3)
2017–2018	Lecce	3	(0)
2018–2020	Cesena	56	(5)
2020–2024	Cremonese	99	(7)
2024	Frosinone	16	(0)
2024–	Parma	69	(2)
- * Club domestic league appearances and goals as of 25 May 2026

Emanuele Valeri (born 7 December 1998) is an Italian professional footballer who plays as a defender for Serie A club Parma.

== Club career ==
He spent the first several seasons of his senior career in lower Italian divisions.

On 10 September 2020, he signed with Serie B club Cremonese. He made his Serie B debut for Cremonese on 27 September 2020 in a game against Cittadella. He substituted Alessandro Crescenzi in the 60th minute. He made his first start on 17 October against Venezia.

On 31 January 2024, Valeri signed with Serie A side Frosinone until the end of the season.

On 13 June 2024, Valeri joined Parma on a three-year contract.
