= Filippo Nardi =

Italian footballer

Personal information
- Date of birth: 3 March 1998 (age 28)
- Place of birth: Treviso, Italy
- Height: 1.75 m (5 ft 9 in)
- Position: Midfielder

Youth career
- 2004–2007: Villorba
- 2007–2010: Treviso
- 2010–2011: Montebelluna
- 2011–2014: Vincenza
- 2014–2015: Montebelluna

Senior career*
| Years | Team | Apps | (Gls) |
| 2015–2016 | Montebelluna | 28 | (1) |
| 2016–2021 | Novara | 46 | (0) |
| 2020–2021 | → Cremonese (loan) | 17 | (1) |
| 2021–2024 | Cremonese | 4 | (0) |
| 2022 | → Como (loan) | 13 | (0) |
| 2022–2024 | → Reggiana (loan) | 50 | (5) |
| 2024 | → Benevento (loan) | 14 | (0) |
| 2024–2026 | Benevento | 0 | (0) |
- * Club domestic league appearances and goals as of 26 April 2026

Filippo Nardi (born 3 March 1998) is an Italian professional footballer who plays as a midfielder.

== Club career ==
Nardi is a creative midfielder, who transferred from Montebelluna in the Serie D, to Novara in the Serie B in 2016 after a successful debut season. Nardi made his professional debut for Novara in a 1–0 win over Cesena on 6 May 2017.

On 22 September 2020, he joined Cremonese on loan.

On 14 June 2021, Cremonese exercised the purchase option in the loan contract. On 31 January 2022, Nardi was loaned to Como.

On 18 August 2022, Nardi moved on loan to Reggiana, with an option to buy. On 14 July 2023, he returned to Reggiana on loan.

On 31 January 2024, Nardi joined Benevento on loan with an obligation to buy.
