= Francesco Cerretelli =

Italian football player

Personal information
- Date of birth: 21 January 2000 (age 26)
- Place of birth: Florence, Italy
- Height: 1.84 m (6 ft 0 in)
- Position: Midfielder

Team information
- Current team: Grosseto
- Number: 8

Youth career
- –2017: Bologna

Senior career*
Years	Team	Apps	(Gls)
2017–2018	Bologna	0	(0)
2017	→ Scandicci (loan)	20	(1)
2018–2021	Pistoiese	53	(2)
2019	→ Gavorrano (loan)	15	(1)
2021–2024	Cremonese	0	(0)
2021–2022	→ Pro Sesto (loan)	20	(2)
2022–2024	→ Carrarese (loan)	39	(1)
2024	Taranto	0	(0)
2024–2025	Arzignano	23	(4)
2025–2026	Campobasso	23	(0)
2026–	Grosseto	0	(0)
- * Club domestic league appearances and goals as of 23 August 2026

Francesco Cerretelli (born 21 January 2000) is an Italian professional footballer who plays as a midfielder for Serie C Group B club Grosseto.

== Club career ==
He made his Serie C debut for Pistoiese on 18 February 2018 in a game against Olbia.

On 11 January 2019, he joined Gavorrano on loan.

In July 2021, he joined to Cremonese, and was loaned to Serie C club Pro Sesto. On 12 July 2022, Cerretelli was loaned to Carrarese.

On 17 July 2024, Cerretelli signed a two-year contract with Taranto.

On 18 August 2024, Cerretelli moved to Arzignano.
