= Felix Afena-Gyan =

Ghanaian footballer (born 2003)

Personal information
- Full name: Felix Afena Ohene-Gyan
- Date of birth: 19 January 2003 (age 23)
- Place of birth: Sunyani, Ghana
- Height: 1.75 m (5 ft 9 in)
- Position: Forward

Team information
- Current team: Iğdır
- Number: 33

Youth career
- 2018–2021: EurAfrica FC
- 2021: Roma

Senior career*
Years	Team	Apps	(Gls)
2021–2022	Roma	17	(2)
2022–2026	Cremonese	30	(0)
2024–2025	→ Juventus Next Gen (loan)	28	(6)
2025–2026	→ Amedspor (loan)	35	(5)
2026–	Iğdır	8	(2)

International career^{‡}
2022–	Ghana	12	(3)
- * Club domestic league appearances and goals as of 22 September 2026 ‡ National team caps and goals as of 12 November 2026

Felix Afena Ohene-Gyan (born 19 January 2003) is a Ghanaian professional footballer who plays as a forward for TFF 1. Lig club Iğdır in Turkey and the Ghana national team.

== Club career ==
=== Roma ===
==== Youth squad ====
Born in Sunyani, Ghana, Afena-Gyan moved to Serie A side Roma's youth team on 13 March 2021, from EurAfrica FC. Just a day after being unveiled on 13 March, he made his debut for AS Roma's under-18 team, scoring and assisting in a 5–0 win over Genoa. He then scored in his next two games for the under-18 and due to his immediate impact he was quickly promoted to Roma's Primavera under-19 squad managed by Alberto De Rossi, where he scored four and assisted two in 15 appearances to finish the season.

Starting the 2021–22 campaign well, he scored six goals in just five Primavera games to capture Mourinho's attention and earn a first-team call to train with the first team in mid-October.

==== First team ====
Afena-Gyan was first called up to the senior team on 24 October, in Roma's Serie A game against Napoli. He made his professional debut three days later, replacing Matías Viña during a 2–1 league victory over Cagliari.

On 21 November 2021, he came on as a second-half substitute against Genoa, and scored twice in the final ten minutes to give Roma a 2–0 victory. The brace made him the first player born in 2003 to score in the Serie A. Before the match, José Mourinho, Roma's manager had promised to buy Afena-Gyan a pair of trainers reportedly costing €800 if he scored. After scoring his first goal, Afena-Gyan ran towards the bench to remind the manager of the promise. Mourinho presented the trainers to him the following day.

Afena-Gyan made 22 appearances in all competitions during his first senior season, scoring twice. Three of those appearances came in the inaugural UEFA Europa Conference League, which Roma won after defeating Feyenoord in the final.

On 6 July 2022, he signed a new four-year contract with Roma, extending his agreement until 30 June 2026.

=== Cremonese ===
On 29 August 2022, Afena-Gyan joined newly promoted Serie A club Cremonese on a permanent transfer.

00He scored his first goal for the club on 20 October 2022 during a 4–2 extra-time victory over Modena in the Coppa Italia.

On 17 January 2023, Afena-Gyan scored an 87th-minute equaliser against Serie A leaders Napoli in the Coppa Italia round of 16. After the match ended 2–2 following extra time, he converted Cremonese's decisive penalty in the shoot-out, eliminating Napoli and sending Cremonese into the quarter-finals.

==== Loan to Juventus ====
On 31 August 2024, Afena-Gyan joined Juventus Next Gen on loan from Cremonese for the 2024–25 season.

He scored six goals in 28 Serie C appearances during the season. Among his goals were strikes against Audace Cerignola, ACR Messina and Foggia. Against Messina, he came on as a substitute, provided an assist and scored the second goal in a 2–0 victory.

He also scored in Juventus Next Gen's 2–0 win over Foggia on 22 March 2025.

==== Loan to Amedspor ====
On 21 August 2025, Cremonese loaned Afena-Gyan to Turkish TFF First League club Amedspor for the 2025–26 season. The agreement included an option for Amedspor to make the transfer permanent.

He made his debut on 24 August 2025, coming on as a late substitute in a 4–2 victory over Sivasspor. He made 35 league appearances and scored five goals during the campaign as Amedspor finished second in the TFF First League and gained promotion to the Süper Lig.

=== Iğdır FK ===
On 24 July 2026, Afena-Gyan completed a permanent transfer from Cremonese to Turkish TFF First League club Iğdır FK. The move ended his four-year association with Cremonese.

== International career ==
Afena-Gyan received his first senior call-up to the Ghana national team on 4 November 2021 for 2022 FIFA World Cup qualification matches against Ethiopia and South Africa.

He declined the invitation, explaining that he considered the call-up premature and wanted to continue developing at club level before joining the national team. He revealed in an interview with Italian journalist, Gianluca Di Marzio that he felt the call-up was too early and that he wanted to concentrate on developing under José Mourinho at club level before accepting a call-up.

Afena-Gyan made his senior international debut on 25 March 2022, starting Ghana's goalless draw against Nigeria in the first leg of the teams' World Cup qualification play-off. Ghana qualified for the 2022 FIFA World Cup following a 1–1 draw in the second leg on 29 March, progressing on the away goals rule.

On 1 June 2022, he scored his first international goal in Ghana's 3–0 victory over Madagascar in qualification for the 2023 Africa Cup of Nations. He also provided the assist for Mohammed Kudus to score the opening goal.

After nearly three years without an international appearance, Afena-Gyan returned to the Ghana national team in May 2025 after being named in Otto Addo's squad for the 2025 Unity Cup. Having missed Ghana's semi-final defeat to Nigeria due to visa issues, he made his return on 31 May, coming on as a second-half substitute in Ghana's 4–0 victory over Trinidad and Tobago in the third-place play-off at the Gtech Community Stadium in London.

He was recalled in May 2026 for a friendly against Mexico in Puebla. He started the match as Ghana lost 2–0.

== Style of play ==
Afena-Gyan primarily plays as a centre-forward but is also capable of playing in wider attacking positions. He is noted for his acceleration, direct running and willingness to press opposing defenders.

His pace has been associated with his background in athletics. While attending high school in Ghana, he competed as a 100-metre sprinter before focusing on football.

== Personal life ==
In February 2022, Afena-Gyan signed a sponsorship agreement with German sportswear manufacturer Puma.

In May 2026, while Afena-Gyan was away on duty with the Ghana Black Stars, thieves broke into his house in Bergamo, Italy and carried his belongings.

== Career statistics ==
=== Club ===
As of match played 26 August 2023

Appearances and goals by club, season and competition
Club	Season	League			Coppa Italia		Continental		Total	
Club	Season	Division	Apps	Goals	Apps	Goals	Apps	Goals	Apps	Goals
Roma	2021–22	Serie A	17	2	2	0	3 (Note: Appearances in UEFA Europa Conference League)	0	22	2
Cremonese	2022–23	Serie A	23	0	5	2	—		28	2
Cremonese	2023–24	Serie B	2	0	1	1	—		3	1
Career total			42	2	8	3	3	0	53	5

=== International ===
As of match played 12 November 2026

Appearances and goals by national team and year
National team	Year	Apps	Goals
Ghana	2022	7	1
Ghana	2023	0	0
Ghana	2024	0	0
Ghana	2025	1	0
Ghana	2026	4	2
Total		12	3

Scores and results list Ghana's goal tally first, score column indicates score after each Afena-Gyan goal.

List of international goals scored by Felix Afena-Gyan
No.	Date	Venue	Opponent	Score	Result	Competition
1	1 June 2022	Cape Coast Sports Stadium, Cape Coast, Ghana	Madagascar	2–0	3–0	2023 Africa Cup of Nations qualification
2	29 September 2026	Accra Sports Stadium, Accra, Ghana	Gambia	2–0	2–4	2027 Africa Cup of Nations qualification
3	12 November 2026	Sekondi-Takoradi Stadium, Sekondi-Takoradi, Ghana	Somalia	2–0	2–0	2027 Africa Cup of Nations qualification

== Honours ==
Roma

- UEFA Europa Conference League: 2021–22

Amed Sporting

- TFF 1. Lig promotion: 2025–26

Individual

- Odartey Lamptey Future Star Award: 2022
- Calcio Trade Ball Most Promising Footballer: 2022
