= Maissa Ndiaye =

Senegalese footballer (born 2002)

Personal information
- Full name: Maissa Codou Ndiaye
- Date of birth: 28 January 2002 (age 24)
- Place of birth: Dakar, Senegal
- Height: 1.92 m (6 ft 4 in)
- Position: Centre-back

Team information
- Current team: Lumezzane
- Number: 15

Youth career
- 2018–2019: Afro Napoli United
- 2019–2022: Roma

Senior career*
Years	Team	Apps	(Gls)
2021–2022	Roma	0	(0)
2022–2025	Cremonese	0	(0)
2023	→ Vicenza (loan)	8	(0)
2023–2024	→ Železničar Pančevo (loan)	7	(0)
2024–2025	→ Turris (loan)	16	(0)
2025–	Lumezzane	11	(1)
- * Club domestic league appearances and goals as of 29 April 2026

Maissa Codou Ndiaye (born 28 January 2002) is a Senegalese professional footballer who plays as a centre-back for Serie C Group A club Lumezzane.

== Career ==
=== Early life ===
Born in Dakar, Senegal, Ndiaye started playing football at a local grassroots school, before leaving the country as a teenager, as he traveled through the Mediterranean Sea by boat and reached the immigrant reception center in Lampedusa, Italy. After moving to Naples, in September 2018 the defender joined Afro Napoli United, a local amateur club that also acts as a pro-integration organization. Due to the Italian federation's rules regarding the registration of under-aged non-EU players, he could not feature in official league matches, being only available for youth tournaments and friendlies.

=== Roma ===
In the first months of 2019, Ndiaye was scouted by Roma, subsequently joining the Serie A club on trial. With the outcome turning out to be successful, the defender officially entered Roma's youth academy in August 2019, although he was officially registered to play in official competitions in October of the same year. Following his performances for the club's under-19 squad, during the 2021–22 season Ndiaye started training with the first team under manager José Mourinho. On 4 December 2021, he featured on the bench in a 0–3 league loss against Inter Milan: in the occasion, Ndiaye was supposed to make his senior debut in the injury time, but referee Marco Di Bello blew the final whistle before the substitution could take place, as the ball was not sent off the field on time. In May 2022, he helped Roma reach the final of the under-19 national championship.

=== Cremonese ===
On 4 July 2022, Ndiaye joined newly-promoted Serie A club Cremonese on a permanent deal. The transfer included an undisclosed sell-on clause in favor of Roma.

==== Loan to Vicenza ====
Having not found game time during the first half of the 2022–23 campaign, on 15 January 2023, Ndiaye was sent on loan to Serie C side Vicenza until the end of the season. One week later, on 22 January, the defender made his professional debut for the club, coming in as a substitute for Nicola Dalmonte in the 87th minute of a 3–0 league win against AlbinoLeffe.

==== Loan to Železničar Pančevo ====
On 6 September 2023, Ndiaye joined Serbian SuperLiga side Železničar Pančevo on loan until the end of the season, with the deal including an option-to-buy.

==== Loan to Turris ====
On 30 August 2024, Ndiaye joined Serie C club Turris on a season-long loan.

== Career statistics ==
As of match played 18 May 2023

Appearances and goals by club, season and competition
Club	Season	League			National cup		Continental		Other		Total	
Club	Season	Division	Apps	Goals	Apps	Goals	Apps	Goals	Apps	Goals	Apps	Goals
Roma	2021–22	Serie A	0	0	0	0	0	0	–		0	0
Cremonese	2022–23	Serie A	0	0	0	0	–		–		0	0
L.R. Vicenza (loan)	2022–23	Serie C	8	0	–		–		0	0	8	0
Career total			8	0	0	0	0	0	0	0	8	0
