= Christian Acella =

Italian footballer (born 2002)

Personal information
- Date of birth: 7 July 2002 (age 24)
- Place of birth: Milan, Italy
- Height: 1.60 m (5 ft 3 in)
- Position: Midfielder

Team information
- Current team: Club Milano

Youth career
- –2020: Cagliari
- 2020–2021: Cremonese

Senior career*
Years	Team	Apps	(Gls)
2021–2025	Cremonese	1	(0)
2021–2022	→ Giana Erminio (loan)	33	(2)
2023–2024	→ Perugia (loan)	8	(0)
2024	→ Giana Erminio (loan)	10	(0)
2024–2025	→ Giugliano (loan)	7	(0)
2025	→ Alcione (loan)	11	(0)
2025–	Club Milano	18	(2)
- * Club domestic league appearances and goals as of 25 June 2026

Christian Acella (born 7 July 2002) is an Italian football player who plays as a midfielder for Serie D club Club Milano.

== Career ==
Acellas was raised in the youth system of Cagliari and then Cremonese.

On 20 July 2021, Acella joined Giana Erminio in Serie C on a season-long loan. He made his senior debut at the club and played most of the season as the starter.

Upon his return from loan, Acella made his debut for the senior squad of Cremonese on 8 August 2022 in a Coppa Italia game against Ternana. He made his Serie A debut for the club on 12 February 2023 against Napoli.

On 21 August 2023, Acella joined Perugia on a season-long loan.

On 23 January 2024, Acella returned on a new loan to Giana Erminio. On 24 July 2024, he was loaned to Giugliano.
