= Matteo Ghisolfi =

Italian footballer

Personal information
- Date of birth: 25 May 2002 (age 24)
- Place of birth: Cremona, Italy
- Height: 1.90 m (6 ft 3 in)
- Position: Midfielder

Team information
- Current team: Potenza
- Number: 77

Youth career
- Cremonese

Senior career*
Years	Team	Apps	(Gls)
2020–2024	Cremonese	5	(0)
2021–2022	→ Grosseto (loan)	8	(0)
2022	→ Fiorenzuola (loan)	1	(0)
2022–2023	→ Giugliano (loan)	18	(0)
2023–2024	→ Cerignola (loan)	13	(1)
2024–	Potenza	39	(4)
- * Club domestic league appearances and goals as of 1 May 2026

Matteo Ghisolfi (born 25 May 2002) is an Italian professional footballer who plays as a midfielder for Serie C Group C club Potenza.

== Club career ==
He made his Serie B debut for Cremonese on 4 October 2020 in a game against Pisa. He started the game and was substituted at half-time.

On 16 August 2021, he was loaned to Grosseto.

On 31 January 2022, Ghisolfi moved to Fiorenzuola on loan until 30 June 2022.

On 21 July 2022, Ghisolfi joined Giugliano on a season-long loan, the club was newly promoted to Serie C.

On 23 August 2023, Ghisolfi was loaned to Cerignola.

On 20 July 2024, he joined Potenza on permanent basis.
