= Joshua Tenkorang =

Italian footballer (born 2000)

Personal information
- Date of birth: 26 May 2000 (age 26)
- Place of birth: Novara, Italy
- Height: 1.84 m (6 ft 0 in)
- Position: Midfielder

Team information
- Current team: Ravenna
- Number: 16

Youth career
- Santa Rita
- Novara
- –2015: Pro Vercelli
- 2015–2016: Arminia Bielefeld
- 2016: Romentinese

Senior career*
Years	Team	Apps	(Gls)
2016–2017	Romentinese	11	(2)
2017–2018	Romentinese e Cerano	33	(7)
2018–2019	Lanusei	26	(2)
2019–2022	Campobasso	84	(10)
2022–2025	Cremonese	0	(0)
2022–2023	→ Virtus Entella (loan)	27	(4)
2023–2024	→ Lecco (loan)	6	(0)
2024	→ Foggia (loan)	9	(0)
2024–2025	→ Lumezzane (loan)	36	(6)
2025–	Ravenna	33	(8)
- * Club domestic league appearances and goals as of 30 April 2026

Joshua Tenkorang (born 26 May 2000) is an Italian professional footballer who plays as a midfielder for Serie C Group B club Ravenna.

== Club career ==
Born in Novara to Ghanaian parents, Tenkorang started playing football at local grassroots club Santa Rita, before playing for the youth teams of Novara, Pro Vercelli and Arminia Bielefeld. At the start of 2016, he joined local side Romentinese, where he subsequently made his senior debut, aged sixteen, in the national sixth tier. During the following season, Tenkorang remained in the squad, as Romentinese officially formed a new club with fifth tier side Cerano.

In the summer of 2018, Tenkorang joined Serie D side Lanusei, where he registered twenty-six appearances and two goals, as the team missed out on promotion, after losing the play-off final against Avellino.

On 30 July 2019, Tenkorang joined fellow Serie D club Campobasso. Here, he spent two more seasons in the national fourth tier, as the team eventually won promotion to Serie C at the end of the 2020-21 campaign.

On 26 September 2021, Tenkorang scored his first professional goal in a home league match against Fidelis Andria. However, the action that led to his goal was criticized by the visitors, as they had expected to receive the ball back after the match had been interrupted due to an injury. As an act of fair play towards the opponents, Campobasso's manager Mirko Cudini urged his team to let Fidelis Andria players score a goal, so they could restore their lead. The visitors eventually gained a 1-3 win. The midfielder finished his first professional season with six goals and four assists in 32 matches, helping Campobasso stay in the third tier.

On 22 June 2022, Tenkorang joined newly-promoted Serie A club Cremonese on a permanent deal. On 24 August, he was loaned out to Serie C side Virtus Entella until the end of the season.

On 11 August 2023, Tenkorang joined newly-promoted Serie B side Lecco on a season-long loan.

On 30 January 2024, he was recalled by Cremonese, and subsequently loaned out to Serie C side Foggia until the end of the season.

On 23 August 2024, Tenkorang moved on loan to Serie C club Lumezzane.

== Personal life ==
Tenkorang has a twin brother, James, who is also a footballer; they played together in the same teams until 2019.

Tankorang is fluent in Ghanaian Pidgin.
