= Marco Zunno =

Italian footballer

Personal information
- Date of birth: 5 May 2001 (age 25)
- Place of birth: Roccadaspide, Italy
- Height: 1.77 m (5 ft 9 1/2 in)
- Positions: Forward; defender

Team information
- Current team: Crotone
- Number: 96

Youth career
- 2016–2018: Novara

Senior career*
Years	Team	Apps	(Gls)
2018–2021	Novara	20	(4)
2021–2025	Cremonese	0	(0)
2022	→ Fiorenzuola (loan)	13	(0)
2022–2023	→ Piacenza (loan)	14	(2)
2023–2024	→ Messina (loan)	33	(7)
2024–2025	→ Foggia (loan)	34	(3)
2025–	Crotone	35	(9)
- * Club domestic league appearances and goals as of 27 April 2026

Marco Zunno (born 5 May 2001) is an Italian professional footballer who plays as a forward for Serie C Group C club Crotone.

== Career ==
=== Early life and youth career ===
Zunno was born on 5 May 2001 in Italy. Zunno did his youth career in the academy of Novara Calcio.

=== Novara Calcio ===
Zunno signed his first senior career contract with Italian club Novara Calcio. He was signed for the 2018-19 Serie C season. Despite making it to the senior team, Zunno didn't made any appearance for the club. Zunno stayed with the club for the 2019-20 Serie C season. Zunno made his debut for the club on 12 January 2020 against A.C. Monza. Zunno came in as a substitute for Filippo Nardi in the 79th minute of the game. The match ended 0–3 with Novara losing the game. Zunno made just one appearance in total at the end of the season. Zunno stayed with the club for the 2020-21 Serie C season. Zunno played his first match of the season against F.C. Pro Vercelli 1892 on 27 September 2020. Zunno was a substitute and was started as a substitute for Tommaso Bianchi in the 80th minute. The match finished 1–0 with Novara losing the game. Zunno played his first Coppa Italia match against A.S.D. Gelbison Cilento Vallo della Lucania on 23 September 2020. Zunno started in the lineup and played the match till the first 70 minutes before getting substituted by Mattia Tordini. The match ended 3–1 in favor of Novara. He scored his debut goal for the club in a 1–2 victory against Carrarese Calcio, when the team was trailing 1–0 on 21 February 2021. He scored second goal for the club on 3 March against Juventus U23 in a match where they were defeated 2–1. Zunno scored again in the next matchday on 7 March, where they emerged victorious in a score of 3-0 against Calcio Lecco 1912. Zunno scored his fourth goal of the season against U.C. AlbinoLeffe on 7 March in the next matchday, which ended in 1–1 draw.

=== Cremonese ===
On 11 August 2021 he joined Cremonese. On 26 January 2022, he joined Fiorenzuola in Serie C on loan until the end of the 2021–22 season. On 18 July 2022, Zunno was loaned to Piacenza. On 8 August 2023, Zunno moved on a new Serie C loan to Messina. On 16 July 2024, Zunno was loaned to Foggia.

== Career statistics ==
As of matches played till 24 March 2021

Club	Season	League			Cup		Continental		Other		Total	
Club	Season	League	Apps	Goals	Apps	Goals	Apps	Goals	Apps	Goals	Apps	Goals
Novara Calcio	2018–19	Serie C	0	0	-	-	-	-	-	-	0	0
Novara Calcio	2019-20	Serie C	1	0	-	-	-	-	-	-	1	0
Novara Calcio	2020-21	Serie C	13	4	2	0	-	-	-	-	15	4
Career total			14	4	2	0	-	-	-	-	16	4
