= Frank Tsadjout =

Italian footballer

Personal information
- Full name: Frank Cédric Tsadjout
- Date of birth: 28 July 1999 (age 27)
- Place of birth: Perugia, Italy
- Height: 1.90 m (6 ft 3 in)
- Position: Forward

Team information
- Current team: Vicenza
- Number: 74

Youth career
- –2019: AC Milan

Senior career*
Years	Team	Apps	(Gls)
2018–2022	AC Milan	0	(0)
2019–2020	→ Charleroi (loan)	13	(1)
2020–2021	→ Cittadella (loan)	27	(3)
2021–2022	→ Pordenone (loan)	15	(1)
2022	→ Ascoli (loan)	17	(4)
2022–2026	Cremonese	42	(4)
2024–2025	→ Frosinone (loan)	15	(0)
2025–2026	→ Pescara (loan)	6	(0)
2026–	Vicenza	0	(0)
- * Club domestic league appearances and goals as of 13 May 2026

Frank Cédric Tsadjout (born 28 July 1999) is an Italian professional footballer who plays as a forward for Serie B club Vicenza.

== Career ==
On 18 September 2020, Tsadjout joined Serie B club Cittadella on loan. He scored his first goal in Serie B in the match against Brescia, in which they won 3–0.

On 14 July 2021, he joined Pordenone on loan. On 5 January 2022, Tsadjout joined Ascoli on loan until 30 June 2022.

On 15 July 2022, Tsadjout signed with Cremonese.

On 30 August 2024, he was loaned to Frosinone, with an option to buy. On 1 September 2025, Tsadjout joined Pescara on loan.

On 15 July 2026, Tsadjout moved to Vicenza for two years, remaining in Serie B.

== Personal life ==
Born in Italy, Tsadjout is Cameroonian by descent through his parents.

== Career statistics ==
=== Club ===
As of match played 3 January 2024

Appearances and goals by club, season and competition
Club	Season	League			National cup		Europe		Other		Total	
Club	Season	Division	Apps	Goals	Apps	Goals	Apps	Goals	Apps	Goals	Apps	Goals
Milan	2017–18	Serie A	0	0	0	0	0	0	0	0	0	0
Milan	2018–19	Serie A	0	0	0	0	0	0	0	0	0	0
Milan	2019–20	Serie A	0	0	0	0	0	0	0	0	0	0
Milan	2020–21	Serie A	0	0	0	0	0	0	0	0	0	0
Milan	2021–22	Serie A	0	0	0	0	0	0	0	0	0	0
Milan	Total		0	0	0	0	0	0	0	0	0	0
R. Charleroi (loan)	2019–20	First Division A	10	1	0	0	–		0	0	10	1
R. Charleroi (loan)	2020–21	First Division A	3	0	0	0	–		0	0	3	0
R. Charleroi (loan)	Total		13	1	0	0	0	0	0	0	13	1
Cittadella (loan)	2020–21	Serie B	27	3	1 (Note: Appearances in the Coppa Italia)	0	–		0	0	28	3
Pordenone (loan)	2021–22	Serie B	15	1	1	0	–		0	0	16	1
Ascoli (loan)	2021–22	Serie B	17	4	0	0	–		0	0	17	4
Cremonese	2022–23	Serie A	20	3	5	0	–		–		25	3
Cremonese	2023–24	Serie B	8	0	3	1	–		–		11	1
Cremonese	Total		28	3	8	1	0	0	0	0	36	4
Career total			100	12	10	1	0	0	0	0	110	13
