= Francesco Folino =

Italian footballer (born 2005)

Personal information
- Date of birth: 23 January 2002 (age 24)
- Place of birth: Ferrara, Italy
- Height: 1.92 m (6 ft 4 in)
- Position: Centre-back

Team information
- Current team: Modena (on loan from Cremonese)
- Number: 23

Youth career
- SPAL
- 2016–2017: Cesena
- 2017: Reggiana
- 2017–2021: Empoli
- 2020: → Cosenza (loan)

Senior career*
Years	Team	Apps	(Gls)
2021–2022	Empoli	0	(0)
2021–2022	→ Pianese (loan)	45	(3)
2022–2024	Carrarese	2	(0)
2023–2024	→ Juve Stabia (loan)	24	(1)
2024–2025	Juve Stabia	16	(3)
2025–	Cremonese	26	(1)
2026–	→ Modena (loan)	2	(0)
- * Club domestic league appearances and goals as of 20 September 2026

Francesco Folino (born 23 January 2002) is an Italian professional footballer who plays as a centre-back for Serie B club Modena on loan from Cremonese.

== Club career ==
Folino is a product of the youth academies of the Italian clubs SPAL, Cesena, Reggiana, and Empoli, with a short loan stint with Cosenza. On 13 January 2021, Empoli loaned him to Pianese in Serie D for a season and a half. On 11 July 2022, he joined Carrarese on a free transfer on acontract until 2025. On 23 July 2023, he was loaned to Juve Stabia for the 2023–24 season. He helped Juve Stabia win the 2023–24 Serie C and earned promotion to Serie B. On 6 July 2024, Juve Stabia signed Furlanetto permanently on a contract until 2026.

On 24 January 2025, Furlanetto joined Cremonese for the second half of the 2024–25 season remaining in Serie B. He helped Cremonese win the playoffs to earn promotion to the Serie A for the 2025–26 season.

== Honours ==
Juve Stabia

- Serie C: 2023–24
