= Gianluca Saro =

Italian footballer (born 2000)

Personal information
- Date of birth: 25 June 2000 (age 26)
- Place of birth: San Daniele del Friuli, Italy
- Height: 1.88 m (6 ft 2 in)
- Position: Goalkeeper

Team information
- Current team: Foggia
- Number: 22

Youth career
- A.S.D. Ancona
- Donatello
- 2015–2016: Pro Vercelli
- 2016–2019: Juventus
- 2017–2018: → Cesena (loan)
- 2018–2019: → Empoli (loan)

Senior career*
| Years | Team | Apps | (Gls) |
| 2019–2021 | Pro Vercelli | 51 | (0) |
| 2021–2022 | Crotone | 7 | (0) |
| 2022–2026 | Cremonese | 8 | (0) |
| 2025–2026 | → Reggiana (loan) | 0 | (0) |
| 2026 | → Cittadella (loan) | 13 | (0) |
| 2026– | Foggia | 1 | (0) |
- * Club domestic league appearances and goals as of 24 August 2026

Gianluca Saro (born 25 June 2000) is an Italian professional footballer who plays as a goalkeeper for Serie C Group C club Foggia.

== Career ==
Saro was born in San Daniele del Friuli.

After playing youth football for A.S.D. Ancona and Donatello Calcio Udine, he joined Pro Vercelli's youth set-up in 2015, before joining Juventus' academy a year later. He later played for Cesena and Empoli's youth teams on loan from Juventus, before returning to Pro Vercelli in 2019. He made 51 Serie C appearances over two seasons with the club. In summer 2021, Saro signed for Serie B club Crotone on a contract until 2025. On 30 January 2022, he made his Serie B debut in a 1–1 draw with Parma.

On 12 August 2022, Saro signed with Cremonese in Serie A taking shirt number 13. In the 2023–24 season he played with the shirt no. 21 with Cremonese relegated to Serie B.

On 1 September 2025, Saro moved on loan to Reggiana. He did not make any appearances for Reggiana in the first half of the season, and on 30 January 2026 he moved on a new loan to Cittadella instead.
