= Cristian Buonaiuto =

Italian footballer (born 1992)

Personal information
- Date of birth: 29 December 1992 (age 33)
- Place of birth: Naples, Italy
- Height: 1.79 m (5 ft 10 in)
- Positions: Striker; left winger

Team information
- Current team: Padova
- Number: 92

Senior career*
| Years | Team | Apps | (Gls) |
| 2010–2011 | Benevento | 1 | (0) |
| 2011–2012 | Aprilia | 35 | (10) |
| 2012–2015 | Benevento | 27 | (3) |
| 2014 | → Padova (loan) | 1 | (0) |
| 2014 | → Teramo (loan) | 11 | (1) |
| 2015 | → Sassari Torres (loan) | 14 | (0) |
| 2015–2016 | Pescara | 0 | (0) |
| 2015–2016 | → Maceratese (loan) | 33 | (10) |
| 2016–2020 | Perugia | 91 | (11) |
| 2017 | → Latina (loan) | 17 | (2) |
| 2018–2019 | → Benevento (loan) | 33 | (1) |
| 2020–2025 | Cremonese | 117 | (13) |
| 2025– | Padova | 39 | (4) |
- * Club domestic league appearances and goals as of 13 May 2026

Cristian Buonaiuto (born 29 December 1992) is an Italian professional footballer who plays as a striker or left winger for Serie B club Padova.

== Club career ==
On 17 August 2018, he returned to his first professional club Benevento on a season-long loan with a buyout option and obligation from Perugia.

On 4 September 2020 he joined Cremonese.

On 1 February 2025, Buonaiuto returned to Padova on a two-and-a-half-year contract.
