= Stadio Giovanni Zini =

Football stadium in Cremona, Italy

Coordinates: 45°8′25″N 10°2′5″E

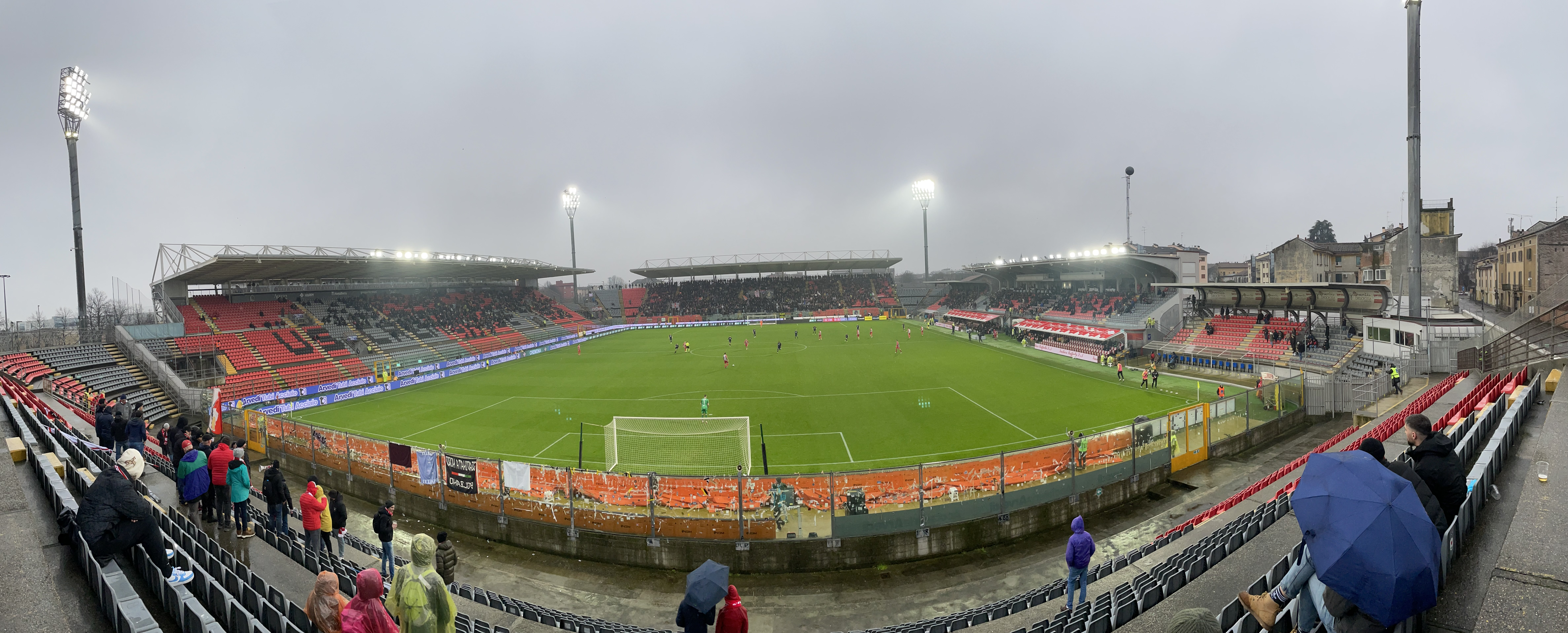
- Stadio Giovanni Zini in 2025.
- Interactive map of Stadio Giovanni Zini
- Former names: Campo di via Persico; Campo Polisportivo; Campo Polisportivo Roberto Farinacci
- Location: Cremona, Italy
- Owner: Cremonese
- Capacity: 16,003
- Surface: Grass; 105x68m

Construction
- Opened: 2 November 1919; 106 years ago
- Renovated: 1929, 1977, 1983–86, 2017–19, 2022

Tenants
- Cremonese (1919–present); Italy national football team (selected matches)

Stadio Giovanni Zini is a football stadium in Cremona, Italy. It is currently the home of U.S. Cremonese. The stadium was built in 1919 and has capacity for 14,834 people.

== History ==
The stadium was named after Giovanni Zini, a goalkeeper of U.S. Cremonese who died during World War I.

On 16 November 2013, it hosted Italy's end-of-year rugby union international against Fiji. Italy won 37–31.

The stadium hosted the 2015 World Rugby Under 20 Championship including its final.

Stadium's 2017–19 renovation converted it into an all-seater stadium, reducing capacity from 20,641 to 16,003. Further works were done before the 2022–23 Serie A season to comply with the competitions and also with an intention to further restore the pre-1929 design parts. This has led to a further reduction of capacity by 1,169 seats to a total of 14,834 places.
