= Tommaso Milanese =

Italian footballer

Personal information
- Full name: Tommaso Pantaleo Milanese
- Date of birth: 31 July 2002 (age 24)
- Place of birth: Galatina, Italy
- Height: 1.73 m (5 ft 8 in)
- Position: Midfielder

Team information
- Current team: Ascoli
- Number: 62

Youth career
- Academy Corvino
- –2016: ASD Fabrizio Miccoli
- 2016–2021: Roma

Senior career*
Years	Team	Apps	(Gls)
2021–2022	Roma	0	(0)
2021–2022	→ Alessandria (loan)	35	(1)
2022–2026	Cremonese	6	(0)
2023	→ Venezia (loan)	11	(1)
2023–2024	→ Ascoli (loan)	14	(0)
2025	→ Carrarese (loan)	9	(0)
2025–2026	→ Ascoli (loan)	22	(5)
2026–	Ascoli	14	(4)

International career^{‡}
2017–2018	Italy U16	11	(1)
2018	Italy U17	2	(0)
2019	Italy U18	2	(0)
2021–2022	Italy U20	7	(1)
- * Club domestic league appearances and goals as of 30 April 2026 ‡ National team caps and goals as of 7 June 2022

Tommaso Pantaleo Milanese (born 31 July 2002) is an Italian professional footballer who plays as a midfielder for Serie B club Ascoli.

== Club career ==
After moving his first footsteps as part of Fabrizio Miccoli's youth academy, Milanese was scouted and signed by Roma in 2016.

He signed his first professional contract in November 2018, before renewing it the following summer.

Tommaso Milanese made his professional debut for Roma on 5 November 2020 in the UEFA Europa League, coming on as a substitute against CFR Cluj. He provided an assist for Roma's fifth goal of the game. On 10 December, Milanese scored his first goal for Roma in a 1–3 away loss against CSKA Sofia in the Europa League.

On 25 August 2021, Milanese joined newly promoted Serie B side Alessandria on a season-long loan deal.

On 2 July 2022, Milanese moved to Cremonese. On 31 January 2023, he was loaned by Venezia. On 1 September 2023, he moved on a new loan to Ascoli. On 3 February 2025, Milanese was loaned by Carrarese.

On 7 August 2025, Milanese returned on loan to Ascoli (now in Serie C, making it Milanese's first career third-tier club), with a conditional obligation to buy. On 2 February 2026, Ascoli made the transfer permanent and signed a contract with Milanese until June 2029.
