= 2020–21 UC Sampdoria season =

Sampdoria
2020–21 season
- Chairman: Massimo Ferrero
- Head coach: Claudio Ranieri
- Stadium: Stadio Luigi Ferraris
- Serie A: 9th
- Coppa Italia: Fourth round
- Top goalscorer: League: Fabio Quagliarella (13); All: Fabio Quagliarella (13)
Home colours	Away colours	Third colours

The 2020–21 season was the 75th season in existence of Unione Calcio Sampdoria and the club's ninth consecutive season in the top flight of Italian football. In addition to the domestic league, Sampdoria participated in this season's edition of the Coppa Italia. The season covered the period from 3 August 2020 to 30 June 2021.

== Players ==
=== First-team squad ===
As of 11 January 2021.

Note: Flags indicate national team as defined under FIFA eligibility rules; some limited exceptions apply. Players may hold more than one non-FIFA nationality.

No.	Pos.	Nation	Player
1	GK	ITA	Emil Audero
2	DF	BRA	Kaique Rocha
3	DF	ITA	Tommaso Augello
5	MF	POR	Adrien Silva
6	MF	SWE	Albin Ekdal
8	MF	ITA	Valerio Verre
9	FW	ITA	Ernesto Torregrossa (on loan from Brescia)
10	FW	SEN	Keita Baldé (on loan from Monaco)
11	MF	URU	Gastón Ramírez
14	MF	CZE	Jakub Jankto
15	DF	GAM	Omar Colley
16	MF	NOR	Kristoffer Askildsen
18	MF	NOR	Morten Thorsby
19	DF	ITA	Vasco Regini

No.	Pos.	Nation	Player
20	FW	ITA	Antonino La Gumina
21	DF	ITA	Lorenzo Tonelli
22	DF	JPN	Maya Yoshida
23	FW	ITA	Manolo Gabbiadini
24	DF	POL	Bartosz Bereszyński
25	DF	ITA	Alex Ferrari
26	MF	FRA	Mehdi Léris
27	FW	ITA	Fabio Quagliarella (captain)
30	GK	ITA	Nicola Ravaglia
34	GK	CRO	Karlo Letica (on loan from Club Brugge)
35	GK	ITA	Lorenzo Avogadri (on loan from Atalanta)
38	MF	DEN	Mikkel Damsgaard
87	MF	ITA	Antonio Candreva (on loan from Inter Milan)
99	FW	SLO	Nik Prelec

=== Other players under contract ===
As of 9 January 2021

Note: Flags indicate national team as defined under FIFA eligibility rules; some limited exceptions apply. Players may hold more than one non-FIFA nationality.

No.	Pos.	Nation	Player

=== On loan ===
As of 29 January 2021

Note: Flags indicate national team as defined under FIFA eligibility rules; some limited exceptions apply. Players may hold more than one non-FIFA nationality.

No.	Pos.	Nation	Player
—	GK	ITA	Wladimiro Falcone (at Cosenza until 30 June 2021)
—	GK	ITA	Matteo Raspa (at Ravenna until 30 June 2021)
—	DF	ITA	Leonardo Benedetti (at Vis Pesaro until 30 June 2021)
—	DF	GER	Jeff Chabot (at Spezia until 30 June 2021)
—	DF	ITA	Axel Campeol (at Grosseto until 30 June 2021)
—	DF	ITA	Fabio Depaoli (at Benevento until 30 June 2021)
—	DF	ITA	Tommaso Farabegoli (at Feralpisalò until 30 June 2021)
—	DF	MNE	Cristian Hadžiosmanović (at Casertana until 30 June 2021)
—	DF	COL	Jeison Murillo (at Celta until 30 June 2021)
—	DF	ITA	Nicola Murru (at Torino until 30 June 2021)
—	DF	ITA	Carlo Romei (at Potenza until 30 June 2021)
—	MF	ITA	Antonio Palumbo (at Ternana until 30 June 2021)

No.	Pos.	Nation	Player
—	MF	ITA	Lorenzo Sabattini (at Imolese until 30 June 2021)
—	MF	ITA	Andrea Tessiore (at Vis Pesaro until 30 June 2021)
—	MF	ENG	Ronaldo Vieira (at Hellas Verona until 30 June 2021)
—	FW	SEN	Ibourahima Baldé (at Foggia until 30 June 2021)
—	FW	ITA	Federico Bonazzoli (at Torino until 30 June 2021)
—	FW	ITA	Gianluca Caprari (at Benevento until 30 June 2021)
—	FW	ITA	Felice D'Amico (at Pro Sesto until 30 June 2021)
—	FW	ITA	Antonio Di Nardo (at Arezzo until 30 June 2021)
—	FW	ITA	Erik Gerbi (at Teramo until 30 June 2021)
—	FW	MNE	Ognjen Stijepović (at Grosseto until 30 June 2021)
—	FW	ITA	Matteo Stoppa (at Pistoiese until 30 June 2021)

== Pre-season and friendlies ==
Win Draw Loss Fixtures

5 September 2020 Friendly	Alessandria (Italy)	2–2	(Italy) Sampdoria	Alessandria, Italy
21:00 CEST (UTC+2)				Stadium: Stadio Giuseppe Moccagatta

6 September 2020 Friendly	Derthona (Italy)	0–3	(Italy) Sampdoria	Tortona, Italy
20:30 CEST (UTC+2)				Stadium: Stadio Fausto Coppi

9 September 2020 Friendly	Piacenza (Italy)	0–3	(Italy) Sampdoria	Piacenza, Italy
20:30 CEST (UTC+2)				Stadium: Stadio Leonardo Garilli

12 September 2020 Friendly	Torino (Italy)	Cancelled	(Italy) Sampdoria	Turin, Italy
18:00 CEST (UTC+2)				Stadium: Stadio Olimpico Grande Torino

== Competitions ==
=== Overview ===
Competition	First match	Last match	Starting round	Final position	Record							
Competition	First match	Last match	Starting round	Final position	Pld	W	D	L	GF	GA	GD	Win %
Serie A	20 September 2020	22 May 2021	Matchday 1	9th	38	15	7	16	52	54	−2	39.47
Coppa Italia	27 October 2020	26 November 2020	Third round	Fourth round	2	1	0	1	2	3	−1	50.00
Total					40	16	7	17	54	57	−3	40.00

Last updated: 22 May 2021
Source: Soccerway

=== Serie A ===
==== League table ====
Pos	Team	Pld	W	D	L	GF	GA	GD	Pts	Qualification or relegation
7	Roma	38	18	8	12	68	58	+10	62	Qualification for Conference League play-off round (Note: Since the winners of the 2020–21 Coppa Italia, Juventus, qualified for the Champions League, the Europa League berth awarded to the Coppa Italia winners was passed to the sixth-placed team, and the Europa Conference League berth awarded to the sixth-placed team was passed to the seventh-placed team.)
8	Sassuolo	38	17	11	10	64	56	+8	62	
9	Sampdoria	38	15	7	16	52	54	−2	52	
10	Hellas Verona	38	11	12	15	46	48	−2	45	
11	Genoa	38	10	12	16	47	58	−11	42	

Source: Serie A, Soccerway
Rules for classification: 1) Points; 2) Head-to-head points; 3) Head-to-head goal difference; 4) Goal difference; 5) Goals scored; 6) Draw. (Note: Head-to-head record is used only after all the matches between the teams in question have been played)

==== Results summary ====
Overall								Home						Away					
Pld	W	D	L	GF	GA	GD	Pts	W	D	L	GF	GA	GD	W	D	L	GF	GA	GD
38	15	7	16	52	54	−2	52	9	3	7	32	26	+6	6	4	9	20	28	−8

Last updated: 22 May 2021.
Source: Serie A

==== Results by round ====
Round	1	2	3	4	5	6	7	8	9	10	11	12	13	14	15	16	17	18	19	20	21	22	23	24	25	26	27	28	29	30	31	32	33	34	35	36	37	38
Ground	A	H	A	H	A	H	A	H	A	H	A	A	H	H	A	H	A	H	A	H	A	H	A	H	A	H	A	H	A	H	H	A	A	H	A	H	A	H
Result	L	L	W	W	W	D	L	L	D	L	L	W	W	L	L	W	L	W	W	L	D	W	L	L	D	D	L	W	D	L	W	W	L	W	L	D	W	W
Position	20	18	14	9	7	9	10	10	11	12	13	11	10	11	11	11	11	10	10	10	10	10	10	10	10	10	11	10	10	10	10	9	9	9	9	9	9	9

Updated to match(es) played on 22 May 2021. Source: Serie A
A = Away; H = Home; W = Win; D = Draw; L = Loss

==== Matches ====
The league fixtures were announced on 2 September 2020.

20 September 2020 1	Juventus	3–0	Sampdoria	Turin
20:45 CEST (UTC+2)	Kulusevski 13'; Frabotta (yellow card) 54'; Bonucci 78'; Ronaldo 88'	Report	Tonelli (yellow card) 4'	Stadium: Juventus Stadium; Referee: Marco Piccinini

26 September 2020 2	Sampdoria	2–3	Benevento	Genoa
18:00 CEST (UTC+2)	Quagliarella 8'; Colley 18'; Augello (yellow card) 32'; Tonelli (yellow card) 48'; Ramírez (yellow card) 89'	Report	Caldirola 33', 72'; Dabo (yellow card) 56'; Letizia 88'	Stadium: Stadio Luigi Ferraris; Referee: Federico Dionisi

2 October 2020 3	Fiorentina	1–2	Sampdoria	Florence
20:45 CEST (UTC+2)	Vlahović 72'	Report	Thorsby (yellow card) 25'; Quagliarella 42' (pen.); Tonelli (yellow card) 70'; Ekdal (yellow card) 73'; Verre 83'	Stadium: Stadio Artemio Franchi; Referee: Piero Giacomelli

17 October 2020 4	Sampdoria	3–0	Lazio	Genoa
18:00 CEST (UTC+2)	Quagliarella 32'; Augello 41'; Ramírez (yellow card) 43'; Thorsby (yellow card) 64'; Damsgaard 74'	Report	Parolo (yellow card) 12'; Caicedo (yellow card) 44'	Stadium: Stadio Luigi Ferraris; Referee: Daniele Orsato

24 October 2020 5	Atalanta	1–3	Sampdoria	Bergamo
15:00 CEST (UTC+2)	Mojica (yellow card) 44'; Malinovskyi (yellow card) 66'; Zapata 80' (pen.); Palomino (yellow card) 86'	Report	Quagliarella 13', (penalty missed) 45; Tonelli (yellow card) 31'; Yoshida (yellow card) 47'; Thorsby 59'; Keita (yellow card) 69'; Jankto (yellow card) 71', (goal) 90+2'	Stadium: Gewiss Stadium; Referee: Gianpaolo Calvarese

1 November 2020 6	Sampdoria	1–1	Genoa	Genoa
20:45 CET (UTC+1)	Quagliarella (yellow card) 5'; Jankto 23', (yellow card) 59'; Thorsby (yellow card) 29'; Ekdal (yellow card) 38'; Bereszyński (yellow card) 86'	Report	Goldaniga (yellow card) 18'; Scamacca 28'	Stadium: Stadio Luigi Ferraris; Attendance: 0 Referee: Federico La Penna

7 November 2020 7	Cagliari	2–0	Sampdoria	Cagliari
15:00 CET (UTC+1)	João Pedro 48' (pen.); Nández 69'	Report	Augello (red card) 40'; Tonelli (yellow card) 64'; Silva (yellow card) 83'	Stadium: Sardegna Arena; Attendance: 0 Referee: Giovanni Ayroldi

22 November 2020 8	Sampdoria	1–2	Bologna	Genoa
15:00 CET (UTC+1)	Thorsby 7', (yellow card) 70'; Ramírez (yellow card) 71'	Report	Hickey (yellow card) 9'; Palacio (yellow card) 42'; Regini 44' (o.g.); Orsolini 52'	Stadium: Stadio Luigi Ferraris; Attendance: 0 Referee: Livio Marinelli

30 November 2020 9	Torino	2–2	Sampdoria	Turin
18:30 CET (UTC+1)	Belotti 25'; Lyanco (yellow card) 61'; Meïté 77'	Report	Candreva 54'; Tonelli (yellow card) 59'; Quagliarella 63'; Ferrari (yellow card) 84'	Stadium: Stadio Olimpico Grande Torino; Attendance: 0 Referee: Daniele Doveri

6 December 2020 10	Sampdoria	1–2	Milan	Genoa
20:45 CET (UTC+1)	Silva (yellow card) 26'; Jankto (yellow card) 45+2'; Ekdal 83'	Report	Kessié (yellow card) 5', (goal) 45' (pen.); Castillejo 77'	Stadium: Stadio Luigi Ferraris; Attendance: 0 Referee: Gianpaolo Calvarese

13 December 2020 11	Napoli	2–1	Sampdoria	Naples
15:00 CET (UTC+1)	Lozano 53'; Petagna 68'; Di Lorenzo (yellow card) 84'; Insigne (yellow card) 90+2'; Mário Rui (yellow card) 90+5'	Report	Jankto 20'; Thorsby (yellow card) 38'; Ekdal (yellow card) 52'; Colley (yellow card) 83'; Ramírez (yellow card) 90+2'	Stadium: Stadio San Paolo; Attendance: 0 Referee: Federico La Penna

16 December 2020 12	Hellas Verona	1–2	Sampdoria	Verona
20:45 CET (UTC+1)	Faraoni (yellow card) 57'; Zaccagni 70' (pen.); Salcedo (yellow card) 77'; Barák (red card) 90+4'	Report	Verre (yellow card) 20', (goal) 54'; Tonelli (yellow card) 29'; Ekdal 41'; Damsgaard (yellow card) 69'; Silva (yellow card) 90'	Stadium: Stadio Marcantonio Bentegodi; Attendance: 0 Referee: Riccardo Ros

19 December 2020 13	Sampdoria	3–1	Crotone	Genoa
18:00 CET (UTC+1)	Damsgaard 26'; Colley (yellow card) 30'; Jankto 36'; Ekdal (yellow card) 49'; Quagliarella 65'	Report	Simy 45+1' (pen.); Messias (yellow card) 45+2'; Marrone (yellow card) 60'	Stadium: Stadio Luigi Ferraris; Attendance: 0 Referee: Gianluca Manganiello

23 December 2020 14	Sampdoria	2–3	Sassuolo	Genoa
20:45 CET (UTC+1)	Colley (yellow card) 49'; Quagliarella 55'; Tonelli (yellow card) 72'; Keita 84', (red card) 90+2'	Report	Traorè 2'; Caputo (yellow card) 34', (goal) 56'; Magnanelli (yellow card) 44'; Berardi 58'; Chiricheș (yellow card) 68'; Locatelli (yellow card) 90+5'	Stadium: Stadio Luigi Ferraris; Attendance: 0 Referee: Giovanni Ayroldi

3 January 2021 15	Roma	1–0	Sampdoria	Rome
15:00 CET (UTC+1)	Smalling (yellow card) 8'; Peres (yellow card) 55'; Villar (yellow card) 63'; Džeko 72'	Report	Yoshida (yellow card) 37'; Augello (yellow card) 61'; Ekdal (yellow card) 66'; Tonelli (yellow card) 74'; Jankto (yellow card) 82'	Stadium: Stadio Olimpico; Attendance: 0 Referee: Daniele Chiffi

6 January 2021 16	Sampdoria	2–1	Internazionale	Genoa
15:00 CET (UTC+1)	Candreva 23' (pen.); Keita 38', (yellow card) 84'; Thorsby (yellow card) 57'; Askildsen (yellow card) 85'	Report	Sánchez (penalty missed) 12'; Martínez (yellow card) 16'; Barella (yellow card) 23'; De Vrij (yellow card) 40', (goal) 65'; Hakimi (yellow card) 90+1'	Stadium: Stadio Luigi Ferraris; Attendance: 0 Referee: Paolo Valeri

11 January 2021 17	Spezia	2–1	Sampdoria	La Spezia
20:45 CET (UTC+1)	Terzi 20'; Farias (yellow card) 37'; Nzola 60' (pen.); Gyasi (yellow card) 90+2'; Marchizza (yellow card) 90+4'; Agudelo (yellow card) 90+5'	Report	Candreva 24'; Yoshida (yellow card) 34'; Bereszyński (yellow card) 56'; Jankto (yellow card) 71'	Stadium: Stadio Alberto Picco; Attendance: 0 Referee: Marco Piccinini

16 January 2021 18	Sampdoria	2–1	Udinese	Genoa
20:45 CET (UTC+1)	Candreva 67' (pen.); Torregrossa 81'; Askildsen (yellow card) 86'	Report	De Paul 55'; Zeegelaar (yellow card) 62'	Stadium: Stadio Luigi Ferraris; Attendance: 0 Referee: Juan Luca Sacchi

24 January 2021 19	Parma	0–2	Sampdoria	Parma
20:45 CET (UTC+1)	Kucka (yellow card) 32'	Report	Yoshida 25'; Keita (yellow card) 32', (goal) 34'	Stadium: Stadio Ennio Tardini; Attendance: 0 Referee: Gianluca Manganiello

30 January 2021 20	Sampdoria	0–2	Juventus	Genoa
18:00 CET (UTC+1)	Thorsby (yellow card) 24'; Ekdal (yellow card) 30'; Jankto (yellow card) 31'; Damsgaard (yellow card) 87'	Report	Chiesa 20'; Bentancur (yellow card) 37'; Bernardeschi (yellow card) 89'; Ramsey 90+1'	Stadium: Stadio Luigi Ferraris; Attendance: 0 Referee: Michael Fabbri

7 February 2021 21	Benevento	1–1	Sampdoria	Benevento
12:30 CET (UTC+1)	Tuia (yellow card) 14'; Improta (yellow card) 31'; Depaoli (yellow card) 41'; Caprari 55'; Ioniță (yellow card) 70'	Report	Silva (yellow card) 6'; Tonelli (yellow card) 48'; Keita 80'	Stadium: Stadio Ciro Vigorito; Attendance: 0 Referee: Gianluca Aureliano

14 February 2021 22	Sampdoria	2–1	Fiorentina	Genoa
15:00 CET (UTC+1)	Keita 31'; Damsgaard (yellow card) 57'; Quagliarella 71'	Report	Venuti (yellow card) 34'; Vlahović 37'; Pulgar (yellow card) 61'; Bonaventura (yellow card) 79'	Stadium: Stadio Luigi Ferraris; Attendance: 0 Referee: Fabio Maresca

20 February 2021 23	Lazio	1–0	Sampdoria	Rome
15:00 CET (UTC+1)	Luis Alberto 24'; Lulić (yellow card) 45'; Marušić (yellow card) 82'; Escalante (yellow card) 89'; Patric (yellow card) 90+4'	Report	Silva (yellow card) 35'; Ekdal (yellow card) 60'; Colley (yellow card) 74'	Stadium: Stadio Olimpico; Attendance: 0 Referee: Davide Massa

28 February 2021 24	Sampdoria	0–2	Atalanta	Genoa
12:30 CET (UTC+1)	Ekdal (yellow card) 63'	Report	Freuler (yellow card) 10'; Malinovskyi 40'; Toloi (yellow card) 47'; Gosens 70'; De Roon (yellow card) 81'	Stadium: Stadio Luigi Ferraris; Attendance: 0 Referee: Livio Marinelli

3 March 2021 25	Genoa	1–1	Sampdoria	Genoa
20:45 CET (UTC+1)	Badelj (yellow card) 34'; Zappacosta 52'	Report	Tonelli 77'	Stadium: Stadio Luigi Ferraris; Attendance: 0 Referee: Luca Pairetto

7 March 2021 26	Sampdoria	2–2	Cagliari	Genoa
18:00 CET (UTC+1)	Colley (yellow card) 63'; Bereszyński 78'; Gabbiadini 80', (yellow card) 89'; Yoshida (yellow card) 89'; Thorsby (yellow card) 90+4'	Report	João Pedro 11'; Godín (yellow card) 26'; Pavoletti (yellow card) 53'; Lykogiannis (yellow card) 69'; Nainggolan 90+6'	Stadium: Stadio Luigi Ferraris; Attendance: 0 Referee: Piero Giacomelli

14 March 2021 27	Bologna	3–1	Sampdoria	Bologna
12:30 CET (UTC+1)	Barrow 27'; Palacio (yellow card) 32'; Svanberg 41'; Soriano 70'; Olsen (yellow card) 78'	Report	Quagliarella 37'; Ferrari (yellow card) 56'; Ramírez (yellow card) 85'	Stadium: Stadio Renato Dall'Ara; Attendance: 0 Referee: Massimiliano Irrati

21 March 2021 28	Sampdoria	1–0	Torino	Genoa
15:00 CET (UTC+1)	Candreva 25'	Report	Lyanco (yellow card) 90+5'	Stadium: Stadio Luigi Ferraris; Attendance: 0 Referee: Daniele Orsato

3 April 2021 29	Milan	1–1	Sampdoria	Milan
12:30 CEST (UTC+2)	Saelemaekers (yellow card) 45'; Bennacer (yellow card) 50'; Hauge 87'	Report	Colley (yellow card) 32'; Thorsby (yellow card) 39'; Silva (yellow card) 45+1' (yellow-red card) 59'; Quagliarella 57'; Candreva (yellow card) 73'	Stadium: San Siro; Attendance: 0 Referee: Marco Piccinini

11 April 2021 30	Sampdoria	0–2	Napoli	Genoa
15:00 CEST (UTC+2)		Report	Manolas (yellow card) 24'; Fabián 35'; Koulibaly (yellow card) 46'; Lozano (yellow card) 78'; Osimhen 87'	Stadium: Stadio Luigi Ferraris; Attendance: 0 Referee: Paolo Valeri

17 April 2021 31	Sampdoria	3–1	Hellas Verona	Genoa
15:00 CEST (UTC+2)	Verre (yellow card) 13'; Jankto 46'; Gabbiadini 73' (pen.); Thorsby 82'; Keita (yellow card) 83'; Yoshida (yellow card) 85'	Report	Lazović 13'; Faraoni (yellow card) 61'; Tameze (yellow card) 72'; Dawidowicz (yellow card) 81'	Stadium: Stadio Luigi Ferraris; Attendance: 0 Referee: Federico Dionisi

21 April 2021 32	Crotone	0–1	Sampdoria	Crotone
20:45 CEST (UTC+2)	Cigarini (yellow card) 37'	Report	Ferrari (yellow card) 45+2'; Quagliarella 53'	Stadium: Stadio Ezio Scida; Attendance: 0 Referee: Daniele Paterna

24 April 2021 33	Sassuolo	1–0	Sampdoria	Reggio Emilia
20:45 CEST (UTC+2)	Berardi 69'	Report		Stadium: Mapei Stadium; Attendance: 0 Referee: Matteo Gariglio

2 May 2021 34	Sampdoria	2–0	Roma	Genoa
20:45 CEST (UTC+2)	Silva 45'; Jankto 66'	Report	Kumbulla (yellow card) 24'; Cristante (yellow card) 32'; Mancini (yellow card) 70'; Džeko (penalty missed) 72'	Stadium: Stadio Luigi Ferraris; Attendance: 0 Referee: Juan Luca Sacchi

8 May 2021 35	Internazionale	5–1	Sampdoria	Milan
18:00 CEST (UTC+2)	Gagliardini 4'; Sánchez 26', 36'; Pinamonti 61'; Martínez 70' (pen.)	Report	Tonelli (yellow card) 31'; Keita 35'; Silva (yellow card) 68'	Stadium: San Siro; Attendance: 0 Referee: Giovanni Ayroldi

12 May 2021 36	Sampdoria	2–2	Spezia	Genoa
20:45 CEST (UTC+2)	Verre 32', (yellow card) 66'; Keita 80'; Ekdal (yellow card) 89'	Report	Pobega 15', 73'; Maggiore (yellow card) 34'; Farias (yellow card) 88'	Stadium: Stadio Luigi Ferraris; Attendance: 0 Referee: Fabio Maresca

16 May 2021 37	Udinese	0–1	Sampdoria	Udine
15:00 CEST (UTC+2)	Okaka (yellow card) 67'; Walace (yellow card) 69'; Bonifazi (yellow card) 86'	Report	Thorsby (yellow card) 52'; Quagliarella 88' (pen.)	Stadium: Stadio Friuli; Attendance: 0 Referee: Matteo Gariglio

22 May 2021 38	Sampdoria	3–0	Parma	Genoa
20:45 CEST (UTC+2)	Quagliarella 20'; Colley 44'; Léris (yellow card) 48'; Gabbiadini 64'	Report	Bani (yellow card) 49'	Stadium: Stadio Luigi Ferraris; Attendance: 0 Referee: Daniele Paterna

=== Coppa Italia ===
27 October 2020 Third round	Sampdoria	1–0	Salernitana	Genoa
14:00 CET (UTC+1)	Silva (yellow card) 10'; La Gumina 54'; Jankto (yellow card) 82'	Report	Dziczek (yellow card) 12'; Đurić (yellow card) 88'	Stadium: Stadio Luigi Ferraris; Referee: Alessandro Prontera

26 November 2020 Fourth round	Sampdoria	1–3	Genoa	Genoa
17:00 CET (UTC+1)	Verre 18'; Silva (yellow card) 26'; Yoshida (yellow card) 26'; Léris (yellow card) 62'	Report	Zapata (yellow card) 13'; Sturaro (yellow card) 43'; Scamacca 60', 72'; Lerager 68'; Pellegrini (yellow card) 69'; Ghiglione (yellow card) 75'	Stadium: Stadio Luigi Ferraris; Referee: Francesco Fourneau

== Statistics ==
=== Appearances and goals ===
No.	Pos	Nat	Player	Total		Serie A		Coppa Italia	
No.	Pos	Nat	Player	Apps	Goals	Apps	Goals	Apps	Goals
Goalkeepers
1	GK	(Italy) ITA	Emil Audero	38	0	37	0	1	0
34	GK	(Croatia) CRO	Karlo Letica	2	0	1	0	1	0
35	GK	(Italy) ITA	Lorenzo Avogadri	0	0	0	0	0	0
Defenders
2	DF	(Brazil) BRA	Kaique Rocha	1	0	0	0	1	0
3	DF	(Italy) ITA	Tommaso Augello	38	1	37	1	1	0
15	DF	(The Gambia) GAM	Omar Colley	30	2	28+1	2	1	0
19	DF	(Italy) ITA	Vasco Regini	4	0	1+2	0	1	0
21	DF	(Italy) ITA	Lorenzo Tonelli	24	1	21+2	1	1	0
22	DF	(Japan) JPN	Maya Yoshida	34	1	25+7	1	1+1	0
24	DF	(Poland) POL	Bartosz Bereszyński	32	1	29+2	1	1	0
25	DF	(Italy) ITA	Alex Ferrari	13	0	11+1	0	1	0
Midfielders
5	MF	(Portugal) POR	Adrien Silva	26	1	18+6	1	2	0
6	MF	(Sweden) SWE	Albin Ekdal	33	2	26+6	2	0+1	0
8	MF	(Italy) ITA	Valerio Verre	29	4	12+15	3	2	1
11	MF	(Uruguay) URU	Gastón Ramírez	25	0	10+15	0	0	0
14	MF	(Czech Republic) CZE	Jakub Jankto	37	6	29+6	6	1+1	0
16	MF	(Norway) NOR	Kristoffer Askildsen	7	0	0+6	0	1	0
18	MF	(Norway) NOR	Morten Thorsby	35	3	29+4	3	1+1	0
26	MF	(France) FRA	Mehdi Léris	22	0	3+17	0	2	0
38	MF	(Denmark) DEN	Mikkel Damsgaard	37	2	18+17	2	0+2	0
87	MF	(Italy) ITA	Antonio Candreva	36	5	28+7	5	0+1	0
Forwards
9	FW	(Italy) ITA	Ernesto Torregrossa	6	1	1+5	1	0	0
10	FW	(Senegal) SEN	Keita Baldé	26	7	12+13	7	1	0
17	FW	(Italy) ITA	Antonino La Gumina	11	1	4+5	0	2	1
23	FW	(Italy) ITA	Manolo Gabbiadini	17	3	10+6	3	0+1	0
27	FW	(Italy) ITA	Fabio Quagliarella	33	13	25+8	13	0	0
Players transferred out during the season
4	MF	(England) ENG	Ronaldo Vieira	0	0	0	0	0	0
5	DF	(Germany) GER	Jeff Chabot	0	0	0	0	0	0
9	FW	(Italy) ITA	Federico Bonazzoli	2	0	2	0	0	0
12	DF	(Italy) ITA	Fabio Depaoli	2	0	1+1	0	0	0
29	DF	(Italy) ITA	Nicola Murru	0	0	0	0	0	0
91	MF	(Italy) ITA	Andrea Bertolacci	0	0	0	0	0	0

Last updated: 22 May 2021
Source: Competitions

=== Goalscorers ===
As of 27 October 2020

Rank	No.	Pos	Nat	Name	Serie A	Coppa Italia	Total
1	27	FW	(Italy)	Fabio Quagliarella	4	0	4
2	3	DF	(Italy)	Tommaso Augello	1	0	1
2	15	DF	(The Gambia)	Omar Colley	1	0	1
2	8	MF	(Italy)	Valerio Verre	1	0	1
2	14	MF	(Czech Republic)	Jakub Jankto	1	0	1
2	18	MF	(Norway)	Morten Thorsby	1	0	1
2	20	FW	(Italy)	Antonino La Gumina	0	1	1
2	38	MF	(Denmark)	Mikkel Damsgaard	1	0	1
Totals					10	1	11
