= Archbishop Holgate's School =

Location
- Hull Road, Tang Hall; York, North Yorkshire, YO10 5ZA; England
- 53.9524°N 1.0411°W

Information
- Type: Academy
- Religious affiliation: Church of England
- Established: 1546; 480 years ago
- Founder: Robert Holgate
- Department for Education URN: 136617 Tables
- Ofsted: Reports
- Head teacher: Lucie Pond
- Gender: Mixed
- Age: 11 to 18
- Enrolment: 1,755
- Website: http://www.archbishopholgates.org

Archbishop Holgate's School is a coeducational Church of England secondary school and sixth form with academy status, located in York, North Yorkshire, England.

== History ==
The school was founded as Archbishop Holgate's Grammar School in 1546 by Robert Holgate, the then Archbishop of York. The link between the school and successive Archbishops of York has been continuous throughout the school's history, and as recently as 2004, the Archbishop of York held the post of Chair of Governors for the school.

=== Grammar School ===
The original grammar school was in Ogleforth near York Minster. In the 1800s it was referred to as "The Rev. Shackley's School", and Thomas Cooke taught there.

=== Comprehensive ===
Until 1985, it was an all-boys' grammar school. With the reorganisation of education in York in 1985, the school changed its name to Archbishop Holgate's School, and became a co-educational [comprehensive] school. During this transition period the outdoor swimming pool was converted to an indoor pool, a new sports hall was built, and upgrades were made to music, design and technology, home economics and other facilities. The school's facilities now include an indoor heated swimming pool, a chapel and a boathouse on the River Ouse. In 2009 a £4.3 million two-storey learning centre with landscaping, parking and bike storage, called the LearningCentre@AHS was built, and now serves as the home of the school's sixth form facilities.

== Former headteachers ==
Recent headmasters have included Donald Frith OBE (1959–1978), Dr J M Frost (1979–1984), and Alan Walker, an old boy and former English teacher at the school (1984–92), all of whom have since died. Dr Frost went on to become principal of the then-new York 6th Form college (now York College (York)), established in the building previously occupied by Ashfield Secondary Modern School, and opened as part of the reorganisation in 1985. The last headmaster was John Harris (1992–2010), who joined the school when it had the lowest results in York, and saw it through expansion from 439 students in 1992 to almost 900 and the best exam results in the school's history before his retirement in 2010. Andrew Daly was Headteacher until 2024, who prior to joining the school, held a position in the senior leadership team at St Wilfrid's Catholic School and Sixth Form College in Wakefield.

== Academic performance ==
In October 2021 the school was inspected by Ofsted and was judged as "Outstanding", the same judgement that the school received in the previous inspection in 2007. Similar to most secondary schools in York, it gets well above-average GCSE results, with 70% of Year 11 students achieving five or more A*-C grades including English and Maths in 2009 (87% achieved five or more GCSE passes at grade C and above).

== Notable former pupils ==
=== Archbishop Holgate's Grammar School ===
- Leo Atang, boxer
- Jack Clarke, English footballer for Ipswich Town
- James Crossley, bodybuilder and contestant in ITV's The Circle, series 3
- Frank Dobson, Labour Party politician
- Richard Philip Douglas, chief operating officer since 2001 of the Department of Health (1968–75)
- Ben Godfrey, English footballer for Atalanta
- Tony Iveson, Royal Air Force Second World War Fighter and Bomber pilot
- Peter Woodthorpe, actor known for Only Fools and Horses amongst other work

== Coat of Arms ==
The school was granted the following arms by the College of Arms:

Coat of arms of Archbishop Holgate's School
Granted 20 March 1950 Escutcheon Or a bend between two bulls' heads couped Sable on a chief per pale Azure and barry of four Argent and Gules a mitre of the first and a rectorial staff in bend of the third. Motto Vincet Amor Patriae
