= Richard Douglas =

Richard Douglas is the name of:

- Dick Douglas (1932–2014), Scottish politician
- Richard Douglas (civil servant) (born 1956), United Kingdom civil servant
- Richard Douglas (footballer) (born 1987), Australian rules footballer
- Richard Douglas (letter writer) (floruit 1560–1600), Scottish courtier
