= Carlo Romei =

Italian footballer (born 1999)

Personal information
- Date of birth: 4 September 1999 (age 27)
- Place of birth: Rome, Italy
- Height: 1.82 m (6 ft 0 in)
- Position: Right back

Youth career
- –2018: Sampdoria

Senior career*
Years	Team	Apps	(Gls)
2018–2021	Sampdoria	0	(0)
2018–2020	→ Vis Pesaro (loan)	13	(0)
2020	→ Siena (loan)	0	(0)
2020–2021	→ Potenza (loan)	1	(0)
- * Club domestic league appearances and goals as of 30 January 2021

Carlo Romei (born 4 September 1999) is an Italian footballer who plays as a right-back.

== Club career ==
He is a product of Sampdoria youth teams and started playing for their Under-19 squad in the 2016–17 season.

On 15 July 2018, he joined Serie C club Vis Pesaro on a season-long loan. He made his Serie C debut for Vis Pesaro on 21 October 2018 in a game against AlfinoLeffe as a 90th-minute substitute for Cristian Hadžiosmanović. The loan was renewed for the 2019–20 season on 16 July 2019. On 31 January 2020, he moved on a new loan to Siena.

On 5 October 2020, he joined Serie C club Potenza on a season-long loan.
