= Morten Thorsby =

Norwegian footballer (born 1996)

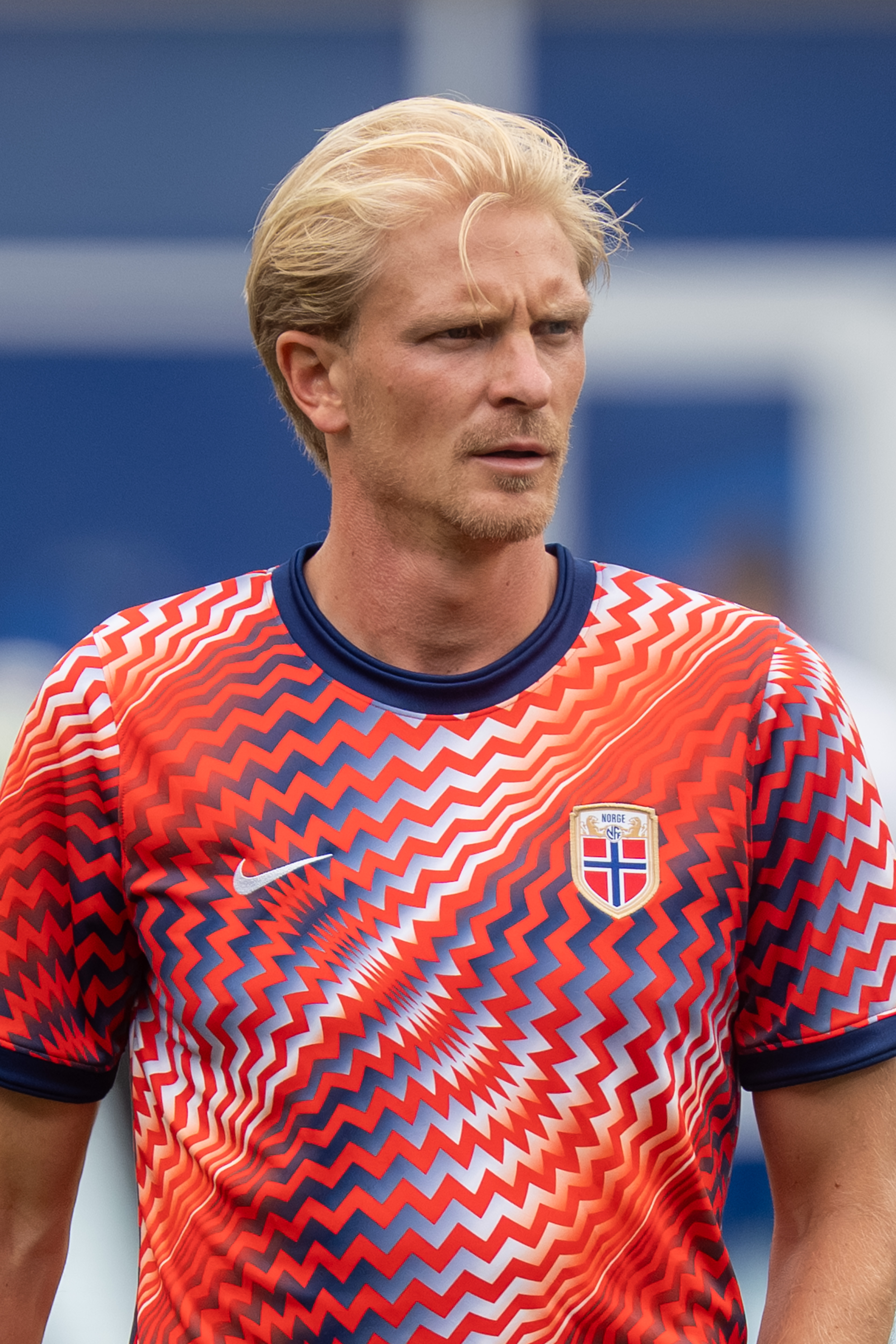
- Thorsby with Norway in 2026

Personal information
- Date of birth: 5 May 1996 (age 30)
- Place of birth: Oslo, Norway
- Height: 1.88 m (6 ft 2 in)
- Position: Defensive midfielder

Team information
- Current team: Cremonese
- Number: 2

Youth career
- –2009: Heming
- 2010–2011: Lyn
- 2012–2013: Stabæk

Senior career*
Years	Team	Apps	(Gls)
2013–2014	Stabæk	14	(1)
2014–2019	SC Heerenveen	115	(12)
2019–2022	Sampdoria	92	(7)
2022–2024	Union Berlin	24	(1)
2023–2024	→ Genoa (loan)	24	(2)
2024–2026	Genoa	43	(2)
2026–	Cremonese	11	(1)

International career^{‡}
2012	Norway U16	14	(0)
2013	Norway U17	13	(2)
2014	Norway U18	6	(2)
2014–2015	Norway U19	4	(1)
2014–2018	Norway U21	28	(7)
2017–	Norway	32	(0)
- * Club domestic league appearances and goals as of 25 May 2026 ‡ National team caps and goals as of 26 June 2026

Morten Thorsby (born 5 May 1996) is a Norwegian professional footballer who plays as a defensive midfielder for Serie B club Cremonese and the Norway national team.

== Club career ==
=== Stabæk ===
Thorsby started his youth career in IL Heming but joined FK Lyn in 2009. While playing in Lyn he was drafted into the boys-15 national team. In 2012, he joined the youth ranks of Stabæk.

He made his first team debut in the 2013 1. Divisjon, as a substitute in four matches. Stabæk was promoted, and he made his first-tier debut in April 2014 against Molde.

=== SC Heerenveen ===
On 2 June 2014, Thorsby signed a five-year contract with Eredivisie side SC Heerenveen.

=== Sampdoria ===
On 11 January 2019, Thorsby signed a four-year pre-contract with Serie A side Sampdoria. The contract will run through the 2023 season. He joined the club on 1 July 2019. He made his debut on 4 November in the 1–0 away win against SPAL, in which he played the full match. After that game he slowly rose in the team's hierarchy, becoming a starter in midfield alongside Albin Ekdal. On 21 June 2020, he scored his first goal for Sampdoria scoring the 2–1 consolation goal in the away defeat to Inter Milan.

The following year, he was confirmed as a starter alongside Ekdal, and he scored 3 goals in 35 total appearances.

The day before the start of the 2021–22 season, Thorsby decided to change his jersey number from 18 to 2 to raise awareness about the Paris Agreement – the number 2 signifying the first aim of the agreement to hold "the increase in the global average temperature to well below 2 °C".

=== Union Berlin ===
On 19 July 2022, German club Union Berlin announced Thorsby's signing.

=== Genoa ===
On 1 August 2023, Union Berlin sent Thorsby on a season-long loan to Serie A side Genoa, with a conditional obligation to buy at the end of that period.

=== Cremonese ===
On 2 February 2026, Thorsby moved to Cremonese, also in Serie A.

== International career ==
On 21 May 2026, Thorsby was included in the 26-man squad selected by Norway national team manager Ståle Solbakken for the 2026 FIFA World Cup.

== Personal life ==
Thorsby is known for his commitment to environmentalism and is an advocate for stronger actions on climate change. He established the We Play Green foundation to encourage the football community to adopt environmentally friendly initiatives, and has met with municipal and national leaders in Italy while at Sampdoria in support of improved climate policy. In August 2021, he switched his shirt number to 2 to raise awareness of climate change. The digit represents the target of the internationally-adopted Paris Agreement of keeping global warming "well below" 2 °C above pre-industrial times, in order to avoid dangerous levels of climate change. He was named 'Young Athlete of The Year' at The BBC Green Sport Awards 2022.

== Career statistics ==
=== Club ===
As of match played 17 May 2026

Appearances and goals by club, season and competition
Club	Season	League			Cup		Continental		Other		Total		Ref.
Club	Season	Division	Apps	Goals	Apps	Goals	Apps	Goals	Apps	Goals	Apps	Goals	Ref.
Stabæk	2013	1. divisjon	4	0	0	0	—		0	0	4	0	
Stabæk	2014	Tippeligaen	10	1	2	1	—		0	0	12	2	
Stabæk	Total		14	1	2	1	—		0	0	16	2	—
Heerenveen	2014–15	Eredivisie	16	0	1	1	—		1	0	18	1	
Heerenveen	2015–16	Eredivisie	25	1	2	0	—		0	0	27	1	
Heerenveen	2016–17	Eredivisie	23	0	3	0	—		2	0	28	0	
Heerenveen	2017–18	Eredivisie	31	6	2	0	—		2	0	35	6	
Heerenveen	2018–19	Eredivisie	20	5	2	0	—		0	0	22	5	
Heerenveen	Total		115	12	10	1	—		5	0	130	13	—
Sampdoria	2019–20	Serie A	24	1	1	0	—		0	0	25	1	
Sampdoria	2020–21	Serie A	33	3	2	0	—		0	0	35	3	
Sampdoria	2021–22	Serie A	35	3	3	1	—		0	0	38	4	
Sampdoria	Total		92	7	6	1	—		0	0	98	8	–
Union Berlin	2022–23	Bundesliga	24	1	2	0	8 (Note: Appearance(s) in UEFA Europa League)	0	0	0	34	1	
Genoa (loan)	2023–24	Serie A	24	2	3	0	—		0	0	27	2	
Genoa	2024–25	Serie A	30	0	2	0	—		0	0	32	0	
Genoa	2025–26	Serie A	13	2	1	0	—		0	0	14	2	
Genoa	Total		67	4	6	0	—		0	0	73	4	
Cremonese	2025–26	Serie A	10	1	0	0	—		—		10	1	
Career total			222	26	26	3	8	0	5	0	360	29	–

=== International ===
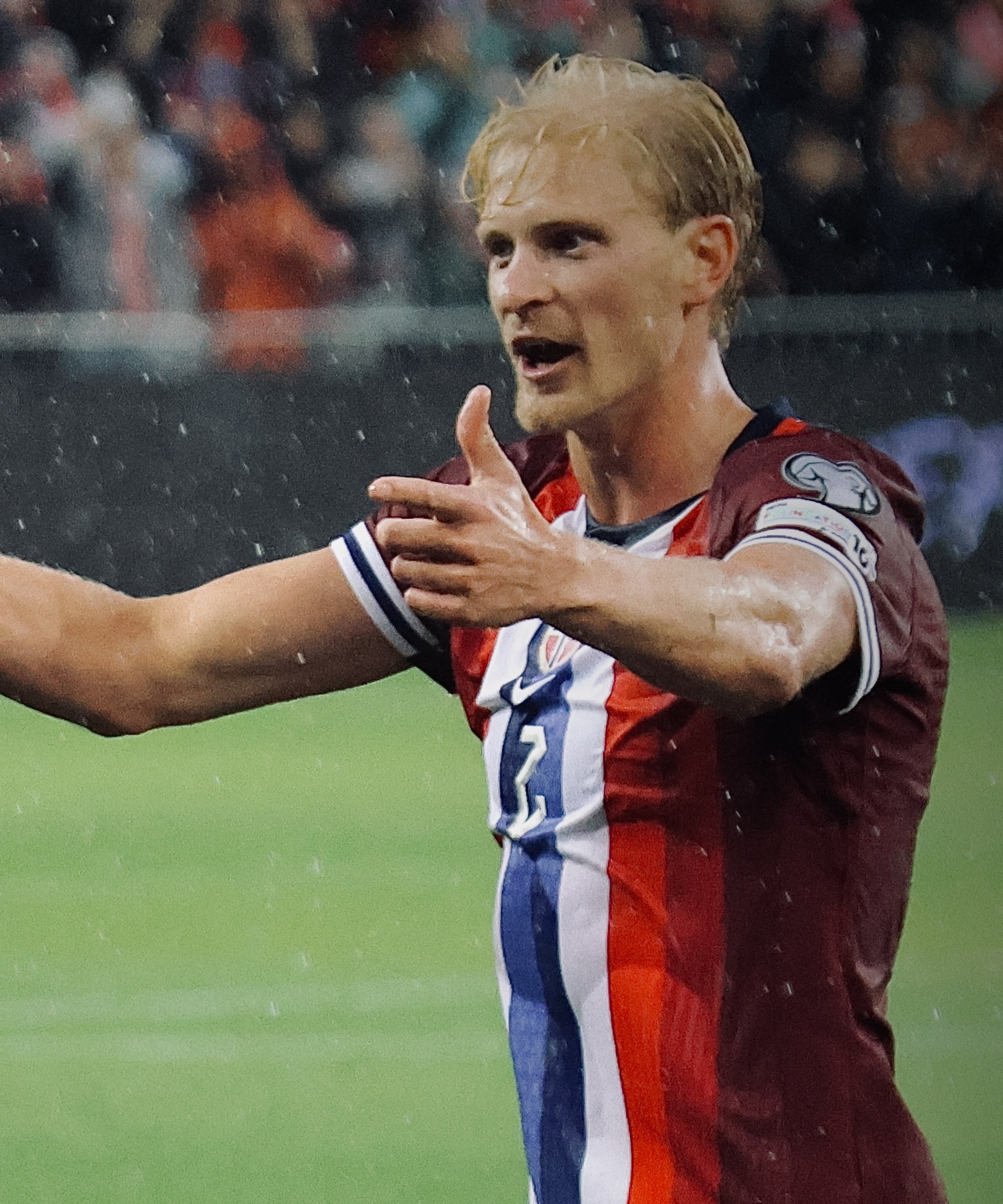
Thorsby playing for Norway in 2025

As of match played 26 June 2026

Appearances and goals by national team and year
National team	Year	Apps	Goals
Norway	2017	1	0
Norway	2018	0	0
Norway	2019	0	0
Norway	2020	2	0
Norway	2021	9	0
Norway	2022	5	0
Norway	2023	0	0
Norway	2024	7	0
Norway	2025	5	0
Norway	2026	3	0
Total		32	0
