= Przemysław Bereszyński =

Polish footballer and coach

Personal information
- Date of birth: 11 January 1969 (age 57)
- Place of birth: Poznań, Poland
- Height: 1.86 m (6 ft 1 in)
- Position: Defender

Youth career
- –1988: Lech Poznań

Senior career*
Years	Team	Apps	(Gls)
1988–1995	Lech Poznań	134	(1)
1995–1997	Sokół Tychy	35	(0)
1997–2002	Dyskobolia Grodzisk Wielkopolski	66+	(0+)
2003	Kujawiak Włocławek		
2005–2006	Lech Poznań (oldboys)		

Managerial career
- –2012: Lech Poznań U19
- 2012–2016: Warta Poznań II
- 2016–2023: Warta Poznań U19
- * Club domestic league appearances and goals

Przemysław Bereszyński (born 11 January 1969) is a Polish former professional footballer and current coach. His son Bartosz is also a professional footballer.

Starting with his hometown club Lech Poznań, he won the 1989–90, 1991–92 and 1992–93 league titles, as well as two Super Cups in 1990 and 1992.

Receiving his UEFA A Licence, he coached the Lech Poznań youth teams, and was the manager of the Warta Poznań's reserve and youth teams.

== Honours ==
Lech Poznań

- Ekstraklasa: 1989–90, 1991–92, 1992–93
- Polish Super Cup: 1990, 1992
