= 2019–20 UC Sampdoria season =

Sampdoria
2019–20 season
- President: Massimo Ferrero
- Manager: Eusebio Di Francesco (until 7 October); Claudio Ranieri (from 12 October)
- Stadium: Stadio Luigi Ferraris
- Serie A: 15th
- Coppa Italia: Fourth round
- Top goalscorer: League: Fabio Quagliarella (11); All: Fabio Quagliarella (12)
Home colours	Away colours	Third colours

The 2019–20 season was the 63rd season of Unione Calcio Sampdoria in the Serie A, and their 8th consecutive season in the top-flight. The club competed in Serie A and the Coppa Italia.

Former Sassuolo and Roma coach Eusebio Di Francesco replaced Marco Giampaolo as head coach on 22 June 2019, with Giampaolo moving to Milan on 19 June.

== Players ==
=== Squad information ===
As of 8 February 2020
Appearances include league matches only

No.	Name	Nat	Position(s)	Date of birth (age)	Signed from	Signed in	Contract ends	Apps.	Goals	Notes
Goalkeepers
1	Emil Audero	(Italy)	GK	18 January 1997 (age 29)	(Italy) Juventus	2018		59	0	
22	Andrea Seculin	(Italy)	GK	14 July 1990 (age 35)	(Italy) Chievo	2019	2020	0	0	Loan
30	Wladimiro Falcone	(Italy)	GK	12 April 1995 (age 31)	(Italy) Youth Sector	2014	2020	0	0	
35	Lorenzo Avogadri	(Italy)	GK	21 August 2001 (age 24)	(Italy) Atalanta	2019	2020	0	0	Loan
Defenders
3	Tommaso Augello	(Italy)	LB / LM / CB	30 August 1994 (age 31)	(Italy) Spezia	2019	2020	5	0	Loan
5	Jeff Chabot	(Germany)	CB / DM	12 February 1998 (age 28)	(Netherlands) Groningen	2019	2024	6	0	
12	Fabio Depaoli	(Italy)	RB / RM / CM	24 April 1997 (age 29)	(Italy) Chievo	2019	2024	14	0	
15	Omar Colley	(The Gambia)	CB	24 October 1992 (age 33)	(Belgium) Genk	2018	2022	41	0	
21	Lorenzo Tonelli	(Italy)	CB / RB	17 January 1990 (age 36)	(Italy) Napoli	2020	2020	3	0	Loan
24	Bartosz Bereszyński	(Poland)	RB	12 July 1992 (age 33)	(Poland) Legia Warsaw	2017	2023	86	0	
25	Alex Ferrari	(Italy)	CB	1 July 1994 (age 31)	(Italy) Bologna	2018		18	0	
29	Nicola Murru	(Italy)	LB	16 December 1994 (age 31)	(Italy) Cagliari	2017	2022	76	0	
34	Maya Yoshida	(Japan)	CB / RB	24 August 1988 (age 37)	(England) Southampton	2020	2020	0	0	Loan
Midfielders
4	Ronaldo Vieira	(England)	CM	19 July 1998 (age 27)	(England) Leeds United	2018	2023	33	0	
6	Albin Ekdal	(Sweden)	CM	28 July 1989 (age 36)	(Germany) Hamburger SV	2018	2021	54	0	
7	Karol Linetty	(Poland)	CM	2 February 1995 (age 31)	(Poland) Lech Poznań	2016	2021	111	9	
8	Édgar Barreto	(Paraguay)	CM	15 July 1984 (age 41)	(Italy) Palermo	2015	2019	104	3	
11	Gastón Ramírez	(Uruguay)	AM / LW / RW	2 December 1990 (age 35)	(England) Middlesbrough	2017	2022	78	12	
14	Jakub Jankto	(Czech Republic)	CM / LM	19 June 1996 (age 29)	(Italy) Udinese	2018	2019	42	2	
18	Morten Thorsby	(Norway)	CM / AM / DM	5 May 1996 (age 30)	(Netherlands) Heerenveen	2019	2023	12	0	
20	Gonzalo Maroni	(Argentina)	AM / LW / RW	18 March 1999 (age 27)	(Argentina) Boca Juniors	2019	2020	1	0	Loan
26	Mehdi Léris	(France)	CM / RM / RW	23 May 1998 (age 28)	(Italy) Chievo	2019	2024	7	0	
91	Andrea Bertolacci	(Italy)	CM / AM	11 January 1991 (age 35)	Unattached	2019	2020	6	0	
Forwards
9	Federico Bonazzoli	(Italy)	CF / SS / RW	21 May 1997 (age 29)	(Italy) Internazionale	2015	2021	15	1	
17	Antonino La Gumina	(Italy)	CF	6 March 1996 (age 30)	(Italy) Empoli	2020	2021	1	0	Loan
23	Manolo Gabbiadini	(Italy)	ST	26 November 1991 (age 34)	(England) Southampton	2019	2023	37	9	
27	Fabio Quagliarella	(Italy)	ST	31 January 1983 (age 43)	(Italy) Torino	2016	2019	179	80	Captain
Players transferred during the season
7	Jacopo Sala	(Italy)	RB / CM	5 December 1991 (age 34)	(Italy) Hellas Verona	2016	2020	59	0	
10	Emiliano Rigoni	(Argentina)	RW / LW / RM	4 February 1993 (age 33)	(Russia) Zenit Saint Petersburg	2019	2020	8	0	Loan
17	Gianluca Caprari	(Italy)	SS / AM	30 July 1993 (age 32)	(Italy) Internazionale	2017	2022	73	14	
19	Vasco Regini	(Italy)	CB / LB / LM	9 September 1990 (age 35)	(Italy) Empoli	2013	2021	124	0	
21	Jeison Murillo	(Colombia)	CB	27 May 1992 (age 33)	(Spain) Valencia	2019	2020	10	0	Loan

== Transfers ==
=== In ===
Date	Pos.	Player	Age	Moving from	Fee	Notes	Source
22 June 2019	DF	(Italy) Fabio Depaoli	22	(Italy) Chievo	Undisclosed		
12 August 2019	MF	(France) Mehdi Léris	21	(Italy) Chievo	€3M	€3M plus bonuses	

==== Loans in ====
Date	Pos.	Player	Age	Moving from	Fee	Notes	Source
25 June 2019	MF	(Argentina) Gonzalo Maroni	20	(Argentina) Boca Juniors	Loan	Loan with a €15M option to buy	
13 July 2019	DF	(Colombia) Jeison Murillo	27	(Spain) Valencia	Loan	Loan with an obligation to buy for €15M	
15 July 2019	GK	(Italy) Lorenzo Avogadri	17	(Italy) Atalanta	Loan		
2 September 2019	MF	(Argentina) Emiliano Rigoni	26	(Russia) Zenit Saint Petersburg	Loan	Loan with a €10M obligation to buy	
2 September 2019	GK	(Italy) Andrea Seculin	29	(Italy) Chievo	Loan		

=== Out ===
Date	Pos.	Player	Age	Moving to	Fee	Notes	Source
12 July 2019	DF	(Denmark) Joachim Andersen	23	(France) Lyon	€24M		
5 August 2019	GK	(Brazil) Rafael	29	Unattached	Free	Contract terminated by mutual consent	
8 August 2019	MF	(Belgium) Dennis Praet	25	(England) Leicester City	€20M		

==== Loans out ====
Date	Pos.	Player	Age	Moving to	Fee	Notes	Source
23 June 2019	GK	(Slovenia) Vid Belec	29	(Cyprus) APOEL	Loan	Loan with an obligation to buy	
30 June 2019	FW	(Poland) Dawid Kownacki	22	(Germany) Fortuna Düsseldorf	Loan	Previous loan extended to 2020	
10 August 2019	MF	(Italy) Valerio Verre	25	(Italy) Hellas Verona	Loan	Loan with an option to buy	

== Pre-season and friendlies ==
24 July 2019 Friendly	Sampdoria	4–0	Pro Patria	Turin, Italy
16:30 CEST (UTC+2)	Bonazzoli 22'; Gabbiadini 25'; Jankto 45'; Bahlouli 90'	Report		Stadium: Stadio Olimpico Grande Torino; Attendance: 1,200; Referee: Matteo Sangalli

3 August 2019 Friendly	Monaco	1–0	Sampdoria	Monaco
19:30 CEST (UTC+2)	Falcao 50'	Report		Stadium: Stade Louis II; Attendance: 3,000; Referee: Johan Hamel (France)

7 August 2019 Friendly	Spezia	3–5	Sampdoria	La Spezia, Italy
21:30 CEST (UTC+2)	Guðjohnsen 16'; Ricci (yellow card) 19'; Pinto 51' (pen.); Gyasi 88'	Report	Bonazzoli 13'; Maroni 28'; Ramírez 47'; Thorsby 55'; Quagliarella 70'	Stadium: Stadio Alberto Picco; Attendance: 4,000; Referee: Davide Ghersini

10 August 2019 Friendly	Parma	2–1	Sampdoria	Parma, Italy
20:30 CEST (UTC+2)	Inglese 22'; Sprocati 79'	Report	Ramírez 6'	Stadium: Stadio Ennio Tardini; Attendance: 2,715; Referee: Matteo Gariglio (Italy)

== Competitions ==
=== Serie A ===
==== League table ====
Pos	Team	Pld	W	D	L	GF	GA	GD	Pts
13	Udinese	38	12	9	17	37	51	−14	45 (Note: Udinese finished ahead of Cagliari on head-to-head points: Udinese 2–1 Cagliari, Cagliari 0–1 Udinese.)
14	Cagliari	38	11	12	15	52	56	−4	45
15	Sampdoria	38	12	6	20	48	65	−17	42
16	Torino	38	11	7	20	46	68	−22	40
17	Genoa	38	10	9	19	47	73	−26	39

Source: Serie A, Soccerway
Rules for classification: 1) Points; 2) Head-to-head points; 3) Head-to-head goal difference; 4) Goal difference; 5) Goals scored; 6) Draw. (Note: Head-to-head record is used only after all the matches between the teams in question have been played)

==== Results summary ====
Overall								Home						Away					
Pld	W	D	L	GF	GA	GD	Pts	W	D	L	GF	GA	GD	W	D	L	GF	GA	GD
38	12	6	20	48	65	−17	42	6	4	9	25	30	−5	6	2	11	23	35	−12

Last updated: 1 August 2020.
Source: Competitive matches

==== Results by round ====
Round	1	2	3	4	5	6	7	8	9	10	11	12	13	14	15	16	17	18	19	20	21	22	23	24	25	26	27	28	29	30	31	32	33	34	35	36	37	38
Ground	H	A	A	H	A	H	A	H	A	H	A	H	H	A	H	A	H	A	H	A	H	H	A	H	A	H	A	H	A	H	A	A	H	A	H	A	H	A
Result	L	L	L	W	L	L	L	D	L	D	W	D	W	L	L	W	L	D	W	L	D	L	W	L	L	W	L	L	W	W	L	W	W	W	L	L	L	D
Position	19	20	20	19	20	20	20	20	20	20	18	18	16	17	17	17	17	16	15	16	16	16	16	17	17	16	16	16	16	14	16	14	14	14	14	15	15	15

Updated to match(es) played on 1 August 2020. Source: Competitive matches
A = Away; H = Home; W = Win; D = Draw; L = Loss

==== Matches ====
25 August 2019 1	Sampdoria	0–3	Lazio	Genoa
20:45 CEST (UTC+02:00)	Ekdal (yellow card) 25'; Murru (yellow card) 59'	Report	Lazzari (yellow card) 21'; Immobile 37', 62'; Acerbi (yellow card) 43'; Correa 56'	Stadium: Stadio Luigi Ferraris; Attendance: 19,500; Referee: Gianluca Rocchi

1 September 2019 2	Sassuolo	4–1	Sampdoria	Reggio Emilia
20:45 CEST (UTC+02:00)	Duncan (yellow card) 16'; Berardi 29', 36', 43'; Traorè 47'	Report	Colley (yellow card) 11'; Vieira (red card) 45+1'; Quagliarella (yellow card) 64', (goal) 67' (pen.); Caprari (yellow card) 87'	Stadium: Mapei Stadium – Città del Tricolore; Attendance: 9,608; Referee: Luca Pairetto

14 September 2019 3	Napoli	2–0	Sampdoria	Naples
18:00 CEST (UTC+02:00)	Maksimović (yellow card) 7'; Mertens 13', 67'; Fabián (yellow card) 37'	Report	Ferrari (yellow card) 26'; Caprari (yellow card) 41'	Stadium: Stadio San Paolo; Attendance: 32,679; Referee: Federico La Penna

22 September 2019 4	Sampdoria	1–0	Torino	Genoa
15:00 CEST (UTC+02:00)	Gabbiadini 56'; Rigoni (yellow card) 78'; Quagliarella (yellow card) 80'	Report	Zaza (yellow card) 59'	Stadium: Stadio Luigi Ferraris; Attendance: 19,041; Referee: Piero Giacomelli

25 September 2019 5	Fiorentina	2–1	Sampdoria	Florence
21:00 CEST (UTC+02:00)	Pezzella 31'; Dalbert (yellow card) 47'; Chiesa 57'; Lirola (yellow card) 88'; Sottil (yellow card) 90+2'; Pulgar (yellow card) 90+5'	Report	Bereszyński (yellow card) 22'; Vieira (yellow card) 39'; Murillo (yellow card) 43' (yellow-red card) 54'; Depaoli (yellow card) 76'; Bonazzoli 79'	Stadium: Stadio Artemio Franchi; Attendance: 33,469; Referee: Daniele Doveri

28 September 2019 6	Sampdoria	1–3	Internazionale	Genoa
18:00 CEST (UTC+02:00)	Rigoni (yellow card) 16'; Linetty (yellow card) 33'; Jankto 55'	Report	Bastoni (yellow card) 10'; Sensi 20'; Sánchez 22', (yellow card) 43' (yellow-red card) 46'; Gagliardini 61'; Škriniar (yellow card) 81'	Stadium: Stadio Luigi Ferraris; Attendance: 23,694; Referee: Gianpaolo Calvarese

5 October 2019 7	Hellas Verona	2–0	Sampdoria	Verona
18:00 CEST (UTC+02:00)	Kumbulla 9'; Lazović (yellow card) 24'; Murru 81' (o.g.)	Report	Ferrari (yellow card) 15'; Chabot (yellow card) 33'; Bonazzoli (yellow card) 41'	Stadium: Stadio Marc'Antonio Bentegodi; Attendance: 17,787; Referee: Michael Fabbri

20 October 2019 8	Sampdoria	0–0	Roma	Genoa
15:00 CEST (UTC+02:00)	Vieira (yellow card) 5'; Bertolacci (yellow card) 33'; Bereszyński (yellow card) 66'	Report	Kluivert (yellow card) 31' (yellow-red card) 86'; Mancini (yellow card) 43'; Perotti (yellow card) 90+1'	Stadium: Stadio Luigi Ferraris; Attendance: 17,031; Referee: Fabio Maresca

27 October 2019 9	Bologna	2–1	Sampdoria	Bologna
12:30 CET (UTC+01:00)	Palacio 48'; Bani 78'; Schouten (yellow card) 83'	Report	Gabbiadini 64'; Bereszyński (yellow card) 73'; Murru (yellow card) 77'; Colley (yellow card) 87'	Stadium: Stadio Renato Dall'Ara; Attendance: 24,099; Referee: Daniele Doveri

30 October 2019 10	Sampdoria	1–1	Lecce	Genoa
21:00 CET (UTC+01:00)	Ekdal (yellow card) 28'; Ferrari (yellow card) 56'; Vieira (yellow card) 75'; Depaoli (yellow card) 76'; Ramírez 90+2'	Report	Lapadula 8'; Petriccione (yellow card) 43'; Tachtsidis (yellow card) 45+4' (yellow-red card) 72'; Meccariello (yellow card) 54'	Stadium: Stadio Luigi Ferraris; Attendance: 18,685; Referee: Davide Massa

4 November 2019 11	SPAL	0–1	Sampdoria	Ferrara
20:45 CET (UTC+01:00)	Igor (yellow card) 43'; Missiroli (yellow card) 87'; Kurtić (yellow card) 90+5'	Report	Depaoli (yellow card) 29'; Caprari 90+1'	Stadium: Stadio Paolo Mazza; Attendance: 11,617; Referee: Daniele Chiffi

10 November 2019 12	Sampdoria	0–0	Atalanta	Genoa
15:00 CET (UTC+01:00)	Depaoli (yellow card) 66'; Ferrari (yellow card) 71'	Report	Castagne (yellow card) 21'; Malinovskyi (yellow card) 51' (yellow-red card) 74'; Gómez (yellow card) 66'	Stadium: Stadio Luigi Ferraris; Attendance: 19,799; Referee: Massimiliano Irrati

24 November 2019 13	Sampdoria	2–1	Udinese	Genoa
18:00 CET (UTC+01:00)	Gabbiadini 45+6'; Ramírez 75' (pen.), (yellow card) 76'; Jankto (yellow card) 88'	Report	Nestorovski 29', (yellow card) 41'; Jajalo (yellow card) 39' (yellow-red card) 51'	Stadium: Stadio Luigi Ferraris; Attendance: 17,031; Referee: Luca Pairetto

2 December 2019 14	Cagliari	4–3	Sampdoria	Cagliari
20:45 CET (UTC+01:00)	Nández (yellow card) 64'; Nainggolan 69'; João Pedro 74', 76'; Faragò (yellow card) 89'; Cerri 90+6', (yellow card) 90+8'	Report	Quagliarella 38' (pen.), 70'; Ramírez 52'; Colley (yellow card) 90'	Stadium: Sardegna Arena; Attendance: 15,658; Referee: Gianluca Aureliano

8 December 2019 15	Sampdoria	0–1	Parma	Genoa
18:00 CET (UTC+01:00)	Vieira (yellow card) 50'; Gabbiadini (yellow card) 72'; Thorsby (yellow card) 89'	Report	Kucka 21'; Cornelius (yellow card) 35'; Dermaku (yellow card) 75'	Stadium: Stadio Luigi Ferraris; Attendance: 19,516; Referee: Rosario Abisso

14 December 2019 16	Genoa	0–1	Sampdoria	Genoa
20:45 CET (UTC+01:00)	Ghiglione (yellow card) 8'; Cassata (yellow card) 22'; Criscito (yellow card) 46'; Romero (yellow card) 82'; Cleonise (yellow card) 90+2'	Report	Vieira (yellow card) 26'; Ramírez (yellow card) 53'; Colley (yellow card) 68'; Gabbiadini 85'	Stadium: Stadio Luigi Ferraris; Attendance: 30,658; Referee: Daniele Doveri

18 December 2019 17	Sampdoria	1–2	Juventus	Genoa
18:55 CET (UTC+01:00)	Caprari 35', (yellow card) 77' (yellow-red card) 90+2'; Jankto (yellow card) 43'; Murillo (yellow card) 61'; Ramírez (yellow card) 90+6'	Report	Dybala 19'; Ronaldo 45'; Pjanić (yellow card) 59'; Demiral (yellow card) 76'	Stadium: Stadio Luigi Ferraris; Attendance: 23,136; Referee: Gianluca Rocchi

6 January 2020 18	Milan	0–0	Sampdoria	Milan
15:00 CET (UTC+01:00)	Krunić (yellow card) 13'	Report	Depaoli (yellow card) 40'; Thorsby (yellow card) 68'; Colley (yellow card) 70'; Bereszyński (yellow card) 76'; Linetty (yellow card) 90+1'	Stadium: San Siro; Attendance: 58,572; Referee: Davide Massa

12 January 2020 19	Sampdoria	5–1	Brescia	Genoa
15:00 CET (UTC+01:00)	Vieira (yellow card) 22'; Linetty 34'; Murru (yellow card) 42'; Jankto 45+3'; Quagliarella 69' (pen.), 90+2'; Caprari 77'	Report	Bisoli (yellow card) 10'; Chancellor 12'; Rômulo (yellow card) 38'; Mangraviti (yellow card) 68'	Stadium: Stadio Luigi Ferraris; Attendance: 20,117; Referee: Gianpaolo Calvarese

18 January 2020 20	Lazio	5–1	Sampdoria	Rome
15:00 CET (UTC+01:00)	Caicedo 7'; Immobile 17' (pen.), 20', 65' (pen.); Bastos 54'; Adekanye (yellow card) 68'	Report	Vieira (yellow card) 31'; Colley (yellow card) 64'; Linetty 70'; Chabot (red card) 74'	Stadium: Stadio Olimpico; Attendance: 30,000; Referee: Daniele Chiffi

26 January 2020 21	Sampdoria	0–0	Sassuolo	Genoa
15:00 CET (UTC+01:00)	Ekdal (yellow card) 28'; Colley (yellow card) 49'; Bereszyński (yellow card) 69'; Gabbiadini (yellow card) 79'	Report	Peluso (red card) 25'; Rogério (yellow card) 90'	Stadium: Stadio Luigi Ferraris; Attendance: 19,260; Referee: Marco Piccinini

3 February 2020 22	Sampdoria	2–4	Napoli	Genoa
20:45 CET (UTC+01:00)	Quagliarella 26'; Jankto (yellow card) 43'; Ekdal (yellow card) 47'; Ramírez (yellow card) 58'; Gabbiadini 73' (pen.); Linetty (yellow card) 87'	Report	Milik 3'; Elmas 16', (yellow card) 43'; Demme 83', (yellow card) 90+3'; Politano (yellow card) 90+5'; Mertens 90+8'	Stadium: Stadio Luigi Ferraris; Attendance: 20,017; Referee: Federico La Penna

8 February 2020 23	Torino	1–3	Sampdoria	Turin
18:00 CET (UTC+01:00)	Berenguer (yellow card) 22'; Verdi 55'; Belotti (yellow card) 60'; Rincón (yellow card) 69'; Izzo (red card) 78'	Report	Tonelli (yellow card) 21'; Ekdal (yellow card) 39'; Thorsby (yellow card) 45+2'; Murru (yellow card) 68'; Ramírez 70', 75'; Quagliarella 79' (pen.); Colley (yellow card) 84'	Stadium: Stadio Olimpico Grande Torino; Attendance: 20,664; Referee: Paolo Valeri

16 February 2020 24	Sampdoria	1–5	Fiorentina	Genoa
15:00 CET (UTC+01:00)	Murru (yellow card) 19' (yellow-red card) 39'; Ramírez (yellow card) 22'; Colley (yellow card) 53'; Depaoli (yellow card) 86'; Gabbiadini 90'	Report	Thorsby 8' (o.g.); Vlahović 18' (pen.), 57', (yellow card) 20'; Badelj (yellow card) 35' (yellow-red card) 45'; Chiesa 40' (pen.), 78'; Duncan (yellow card) 45+1'	Stadium: Stadio Luigi Ferraris; Attendance: 20,284; Referee: Massimiliano Irrati

8 March 2020 26	Sampdoria	2–1	Hellas Verona	Genoa
15:00 CET (UTC+01:00)	Vieira (yellow card) 40'; Tonelli (yellow card) 70'; Quagliarella 77', 86' (pen.); Jankto (yellow card) 79'; Linetty (yellow card) 90+7'	Report	Audero 32' (o.g.); Di Carmine (yellow card) 47'; Badu (yellow card) 77'; Dawidowicz (yellow card) 85'	Stadium: Stadio Luigi Ferraris; Attendance: 0 Referee: Paolo Valeri
Note: Match was initially postponed to 13 May from its original date of 2 March due to concerns over the COVID-19 pandemic, but was later moved to 8 March to be played behind closed doors.

21 June 2020 25	Internazionale	2–1	Sampdoria	Milan
21:45 CEST (UTC+02:00)	Lukaku 10'; Martínez 33', (yellow card) 48'; Valero (yellow card) 86'; Gagliardini (yellow card) 90'	Report	Bertolacci (yellow card) 22'; Thorsby 53', (yellow card) 64'; Vieira (yellow card) 90+3'	Stadium: San Siro; Attendance: 0 Referee: Maurizio Mariani
Note: Match was postponed to 21 June from its original date of 23 February due to concerns over the COVID-19 pandemic. All subsequent matches were also shuffled to allow for this accommodation. On 9 March all sports events in Italy were suspended until 3 April. This was the first match played since the COVID-19 pandemic lockdown in Italy.

24 June 2020 27	Roma	2–1	Sampdoria	Rome
21:45 CEST (UTC+02:00)	Džeko 64', 85'; Mkhitaryan (yellow card) 81'	Report	Gabbiadini 11'; Jankto (yellow card) 39'; Bereszyński (yellow card) 59'	Stadium: Stadio Olimpico; Attendance: 0 Referee: Gianpaolo Calvarese
Note: Match was postponed to 15 March, then to 24 June, from its original date of 8 March due to schedule shuffling to allow for Sampdoria vs Hellas Verona to be played following its previous postponement due to concerns over the COVID-19 pandemic.

28 June 2020 28	Sampdoria	1–2	Bologna	Genoa
19:30 CEST (UTC+02:00)	Ekdal (yellow card) 57'; Tonelli (yellow card) 66'; Bonazzoli 88'; Yoshida (yellow card) 90+4'	Report	Medel (yellow card) 58'; Barrow 72' (pen.); Orsolini 75'	Stadium: Stadio Luigi Ferraris; Attendance: 0 Referee: Daniele Doveri

1 July 2020 29	Lecce	1–2	Sampdoria	Lecce
21:45 CEST (UTC+02:00)	Paz (yellow card) 37'; Mancosu 50' (pen.), (yellow card) 67'	Report	Ramírez 40' (pen.), 75' (pen.); Augello (yellow card) 58'; Thorsby (yellow card) 77'; Bereszyński (yellow card) 90+1'	Stadium: Stadio Via del Mare; Attendance: 0 Referee: Gianluca Rocchi

5 July 2020 30	Sampdoria	3–0	SPAL	Genoa
19:30 CEST (UTC+02:00)	Bertolacci (yellow card) 3'; Linetty 12', 45+3'; Gabbiadini 45'	Report	Cionek (yellow card) 37'	Stadium: Stadio Luigi Ferraris; Attendance: 0 Referee: Piero Giacomelli

8 July 2020 31	Atalanta	2–0	Sampdoria	Bergamo
21:45 CEST (UTC+02:00)	Djimsiti (yellow card) 24'; Toloi 75'; Muriel 85'; Castagne (yellow card) 90+5'	Report	Thorsby (yellow card) 35'; Jankto (yellow card) 56'; Bereszyński (yellow card) 65'	Stadium: Gewiss Stadium; Attendance: 0 Referee: Antonio Giua

12 July 2020 32	Udinese	1–3	Sampdoria	Udine
19:30 CEST (UTC+02:00)	Lasagna 37'; Ter Avest (yellow card) 74'	Report	Ekdal (yellow card) 25'; Audero (yellow card) 38'; Quagliarella 45+1'; Thorsby (yellow card) 69'; Bonazzoli 84'; Augello (yellow card) 86'; Gabbiadini 90+4'	Stadium: Dacia Arena; Attendance: 0 Referee: Paolo Valeri

15 July 2020 33	Sampdoria	3–0	Cagliari	Genoa
19:30 CEST (UTC+02:00)	Gabbiadini 8'; Bonazzoli 41', 53'	Report	Ioniță (yellow card) 17'; Rog (yellow card) 69'	Stadium: Stadio Luigi Ferraris; Attendance: 0 Referee: Luca Pairetto

19 July 2020 34	Parma	2–3	Sampdoria	Parma
17:15 CEST (UTC+02:00)	Gervinho 18'; Bereszyński 40' (o.g.)	Report	Chabot 48'; Ekdal (yellow card) 52'; Quagliarella 69'; Bonazzoli 78'	Stadium: Stadio Ennio Tardini; Attendance: 0 Referee: Gianpaolo Calvarese

22 July 2020 35	Sampdoria	1–2	Genoa	Genoa
21:45 CEST (UTC+02:00)	Colley (yellow card) 21'; Gabbiadini 32'; Bereszyński (yellow card) 45+2'; Vieira (yellow card) 46'; Jankto (yellow card) 74'	Report	Criscito 22' (pen.); Lerager (yellow card) 42', (goal) 72'; Biraschi (yellow card) 68'	Stadium: Stadio Luigi Ferraris; Attendance: 0 Referee: Marco Guida

26 July 2020 36	Juventus	2–0	Sampdoria	Turin
21:45 CEST (UTC+02:00)	Pjanić (yellow card) 45'; Ronaldo 45+7'; Bernardeschi 67', (yellow card) 69'; Cuadrado (yellow card) 80'; Rabiot (yellow card) 86'	Report	Thorsby (yellow card) 45+3' (yellow-red card) 77'; Tonelli (yellow card) 45+6'; Jankto (yellow card) 66'; Depaoli (yellow card) 88'	Stadium: Allianz Stadium; Attendance: 0 Referee: Francesco Fourneau

29 July 2020 37	Sampdoria	1–4	Milan	Genoa
19:30 CEST (UTC+02:00)	Bereszyński (yellow card) 36'; Askildsen 87'	Report	Ibrahimović 4', 58'; Rebić (yellow card) 45+6'; Çalhanoğlu 54'; Leão 90+2'	Stadium: Stadio Luigi Ferraris; Attendance: 0 Referee: Fabrizio Pasqua

1 August 2020 38	Brescia	1–1	Sampdoria	Brescia
18:00 CEST (UTC+02:00)	Gastaldello (yellow card) 26'; Torregrossa 49' (pen.)	Report	Vieira (yellow card) 36'; Léris 41'; Falcone (yellow card) 48'; Askildsen (yellow card) 81' (yellow-red card) 90+2'	Stadium: Stadio Mario Rigamonti; Attendance: 0 Referee: Michael Fabbri

=== Coppa Italia ===
18 August 2019 Third round	Crotone	1–3	Sampdoria	Crotone
20:45 CEST (UTC+02:00)	Molina 8'; Benali (yellow card) 31'		Caprari 37', (yellow card) 59'; Quagliarella 42' (pen.); Jankto (yellow card) 56'; Maroni 60'; Bereszyński (yellow card) 66'	Stadium: Stadio Ezio Scida; Attendance: 8,068; Referee: Juan Luca Sacchi

5 December 2019 Fourth round	Cagliari	2–1	Sampdoria	Cagliari
21:00 CET (UTC+01:00)	Cerri 7'; Ragatzu 48'	Report	Gabbiadini 87'	Stadium: Sardegna Arena; Attendance: 11,781; Referee: Gianluca Manganiello

== Statistics ==
=== Appearances and goals ===
No.	Pos	Nat	Player	Total		Serie A		Coppa Italia	
No.	Pos	Nat	Player	Apps	Goals	Apps	Goals	Apps	Goals
Goalkeepers
1	GK	(Italy) ITA	Emil Audero	38	0	36	0	2	0
22	GK	(Italy) ITA	Andrea Seculin	0	0	0	0	0	0
30	GK	(Italy) ITA	Wladimiro Falcone	2	0	2	0	0	0
35	GK	(Italy) ITA	Lorenzo Avogadri	0	0	0	0	0	0
Defenders
3	DF	(Italy) ITA	Tommaso Augello	18	0	12+5	0	1	0
5	DF	(Germany) GER	Jeff Chabot	9	1	7+1	1	1	0
12	DF	(Italy) ITA	Fabio Depaoli	29	0	21+8	0	0	0
15	DF	(The Gambia) GAM	Omar Colley	32	0	30+1	0	1	0
21	DF	(Italy) ITA	Lorenzo Tonelli	9	0	9	0	0	0
24	DF	(Poland) POL	Bartosz Bereszyński	29	0	27+1	0	1	0
25	DF	(Italy) ITA	Alex Ferrari	13	0	11+1	0	1	0
29	DF	(Italy) ITA	Nicola Murru	29	0	26+2	0	1	0
34	DF	(Japan) JPN	Maya Yoshida	14	0	13+1	0	0	0
Midfielders
4	MF	(England) ENG	Ronaldo Vieira	29	0	20+7	0	2	0
6	MF	(Sweden) SWE	Albin Ekdal	33	0	27+5	0	0+1	0
7	MF	(Poland) POL	Karol Linetty	30	4	22+6	4	2	0
8	MF	(Paraguay) PAR	Édgar Barreto	2	0	1+1	0	0	0
11	MF	(Uruguay) URU	Gastón Ramírez	27	7	19+7	7	1	0
14	MF	(Czech Republic) CZE	Jakub Jankto	31	2	25+5	2	1	0
16	MF	(Norway) NOR	Kristoffer Askildsen	4	1	0+4	1	0	0
18	MF	(Norway) NOR	Morten Thorsby	25	1	21+3	1	1	0
20	MF	(Argentina) ARG	Gonzalo Maroni	7	1	1+4	0	1+1	1
26	MF	(France) FRA	Mehdi Léris	16	1	3+12	1	1	0
91	MF	(Italy) ITA	Andrea Bertolacci	12	0	8+4	0	0	0
Forwards
9	FW	(Italy) ITA	Federico Bonazzoli	19	6	7+12	6	0	0
17	FW	(Italy) ITA	Antonino La Gumina	5	0	2+3	0	0	0
23	FW	(Italy) ITA	Manolo Gabbiadini	35	12	24+9	11	0+2	1
27	FW	(Italy) ITA	Fabio Quagliarella	29	12	26+2	11	1	1
32	FW	(Italy) ITA	Felice D'Amico	2	0	0+2	0	0	0
Players transferred out during the season
10	MF	(Argentina) ARG	Emiliano Rigoni	9	0	4+4	0	0+1	0
17	FW	(Italy) ITA	Gianluca Caprari	20	4	5+13	3	2	1
19	DF	(Italy) ITA	Vasco Regini	4	0	2+1	0	0+1	0
21	DF	(Colombia) COL	Jeison Murillo	12	0	7+3	0	2	0

Last updated: 2 August 2020
Source: Competitions

=== Goalscorers ===
Rank	No.	Pos	Nat	Name	Serie A	Coppa Italia	Total
1	27	FW	(Italy)	Fabio Quagliarella	7	1	8
2	23	FW	(Italy)	Manolo Gabbiadini	5	1	6
3	11	MF	(Uruguay)	Gastón Ramírez	5	0	5
4	17	FW	(Italy)	Gianluca Caprari	3	1	4
5	7	MF	(Poland)	Karol Linetty	2	0	2
5	14	MF	(Czech Republic)	Jakub Jankto	2	0	2
7	9	FW	(Italy)	Federico Bonazzoli	1	0	1
7	20	MF	(Argentina)	Gonzalo Maroni	0	1	1
Own goal					0	0	0
Totals					25	4	29

Last updated: 8 February 2020

=== Clean sheets ===
Rank	No.	Pos	Nat	Name	Serie A	Coppa Italia	Total
1	1	GK	(Italy)	Emil Audero	7	0	7
Totals					7	0	7

Last updated: 8 February 2020

=== Disciplinary record ===
No.	Pos	Nat	Name	Serie A			Coppa Italia			Total		
No.	Pos	Nat	Name	Booked	(yellow card) (yellow-red card)	Sent off (straight red)	Booked	(yellow card) (yellow-red card)	Sent off (straight red)	Booked	(yellow card) (yellow-red card)	Sent off (straight red)
5	DF	(Germany)	Jeff Chabot	1	0	1	0	0	0	1	0	1
12	DF	(Italy)	Fabio Depaoli	5	0	0	0	0	0	5	0	0
15	DF	(The Gambia)	Omar Colley	8	0	0	0	0	0	8	0	0
21	DF	(Colombia)	Jeison Murillo	1	1	0	0	0	0	1	1	0
21	DF	(Italy)	Lorenzo Tonelli	1	0	0	0	0	0	1	0	0
24	DF	(Poland)	Bartosz Bereszyński	5	0	0	1	0	0	6	0	0
25	DF	(Italy)	Alex Ferrari	4	0	0	0	0	0	4	0	0
29	DF	(Italy)	Nicola Murru	4	0	0	0	0	0	4	0	0
4	MF	(England)	Ronaldo Vieira	7	0	1	0	0	0	7	0	1
6	MF	(Sweden)	Albin Ekdal	5	0	0	0	0	0	5	0	0
7	MF	(Poland)	Karol Linetty	3	0	0	0	0	0	3	0	0
10	MF	(Argentina)	Emiliano Rigoni	2	0	0	0	0	0	2	0	0
11	MF	(Uruguay)	Gastón Ramírez	4	0	0	0	0	0	4	0	0
14	MF	(Czech Republic)	Jakub Jankto	3	0	0	1	0	0	4	0	0
18	MF	(Norway)	Morten Thorsby	3	0	0	0	0	0	3	0	0
91	MF	(Italy)	Andrea Bertolacci	1	0	0	0	0	0	1	0	0
9	FW	(Italy)	Federico Bonazzoli	1	0	0	0	0	0	1	0	0
17	FW	(Italy)	Gianluca Caprari	2	1	0	1	0	0	3	1	0
23	FW	(Italy)	Manolo Gabbiadini	2	0	0	0	0	0	2	0	0
27	FW	(Italy)	Fabio Quagliarella	2	0	0	0	0	0	2	0	0
Totals				64	2	2	3	0	0	67	2	2

Last updated: 8 February 2020
