= Bartosz Bereszyński =

Polish footballer (born 1992)

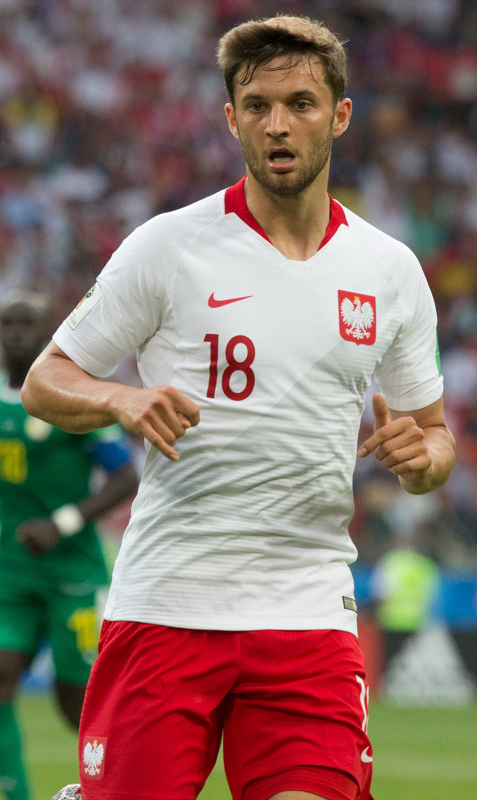
- Bereszyński with Poland at the 2018 FIFA World Cup

Personal information
- Full name: Bartosz Bereszyński
- Date of birth: 12 July 1992 (age 34)
- Place of birth: Poznań, Poland
- Height: 1.83 m (6 ft 0 in)
- Position: Right-back

Team information
- Current team: Motor Lublin
- Number: 18

Youth career
- TPS Winogrady Poznań
- Poznaniak Poznań
- 2007–2008: Warta Poznań
- 2008–2009: Lech Poznań

Senior career*
Years	Team	Apps	(Gls)
2010–2013	Lech Poznań	13	(1)
2011–2012	→ Warta Poznań (loan)	27	(1)
2013–2017	Legia Warsaw	73	(1)
2017–2025	Sampdoria	202	(1)
2023	→ Napoli (loan)	3	(0)
2023–2024	→ Empoli (loan)	24	(0)
2025–2026	Palermo	20	(0)
2026–	Motor Lublin	13	(1)

International career^{‡}
2010–2011	Poland U19	16	(1)
2011–2012	Poland U20	9	(1)
2013–2014	Poland U21	5	(0)
2013–	Poland	59	(0)
- * Club domestic league appearances and goals as of 13:13, 8 November 2026 (UTC) ‡ National team caps and goals as of 17 November 2025

Bartosz Bereszyński (born 12 July 1992) is a Polish professional footballer who plays as a right-back for Ekstraklasa club Motor Lublin and the Poland national team.

== Club career ==
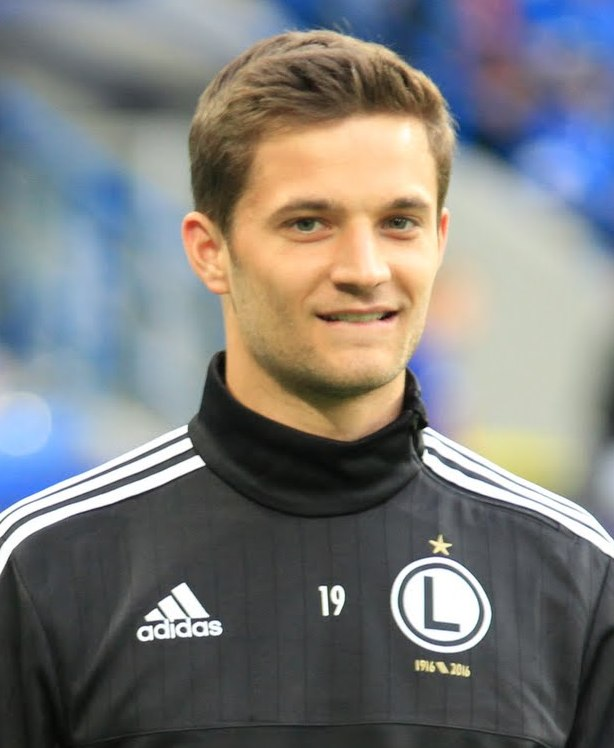
Bereszyński with Legia Warsaw in 2015

Born in Poznań, Bereszyński played youth football with TPS Winogrady Poznań, Poznaniak Poznań, Warta Poznań and Lech Poznań. He played senior football with Lech Poznań, Warta Poznań and Legia Warsaw. While with Lech Poznań, he played in the UEFA Europa League qualifying rounds. He was one of the very few players to have moved voluntarily from Lech to Legia, who are fierce rivals, was nicknamed "Judas" and received a violent reaction from the Lech fans.

Bereszyński was sent off in the last round of the 2013–14 UEFA Europa League group stage, and was suspended for the next three European matches. He did not feature in the second round nor the first leg of the 3rd qualification round in the 2014–15 UEFA Champions League. However, as his club failed to include him in their squad registration for the second round matches, he had not finished his suspension when he came on as a sub in the 86th minute in the return leg against Celtic F.C. in the third round. Legia won the match 2–0, and 6–1 on aggregate. However, after considering the mistake, UEFA set the result to a 3–0 victory for Celtic. This made the Scottish team winners on the away goals rule.

In January 2017, Bereszyński moved to Italy, signing a four-year deal with Sampdoria.

On 7 January 2023, Napoli announced the signing of Bereszyński on loan with a purchase option.

Following Sampdoria's relegation to Serie B at the end of the 2022–23 season, Bereszyński appeared in two games for the club before returning to top flight on 22 August 2023, when he joined Empoli on a one-year loan with an option to make the move permanent.

Bereszyński left Sampdoria upon the expiration of his contract in June 2025. On 20 September 2025, he signed with Serie B side Palermo.

On 3 July 2026, Bereszyński signed a two-year contract with Ekstraklasa club Motor Lublin.

== International career ==
Having previously represented Poland at youth level, in the under-19, under-20, and under-21 teams, Bereszyński debuted for the senior national team against Liechtenstein on 4 June 2013.

In June 2018, Bereszyński was named in Poland's squad for the 2018 FIFA World Cup in Russia. He was also part of Poland's squads for the UEFA Euro 2020, the 2022 FIFA World Cup and the UEFA Euro 2024.

== Personal life ==
On 14 March 2020, Bereszyński tested positive for COVID-19, following its pandemic in Italy. His father Przemysław Bereszyński was also a professional football player and currently a professional coach.

== Career statistics ==
=== Club ===
As of match played 8 May 2026

Appearances and goals by club, season and competition
Club	Season	League			National cup (Note: Includes Polish Cup, Coppa Italia)		Europe		Other		Total	
Club	Season	Division	Apps	Goals	Apps	Goals	Apps	Goals	Apps	Goals	Apps	Goals
Lech Poznań	2009–10	Ekstraklasa	2	0	0	0	0	0	—		2	0
Lech Poznań	2010–11	Ekstraklasa	0	0	0	0	0	0	0	0	0	0
Lech Poznań	2012–13	Ekstraklasa	11	1	1	0	3 (Note: Appearances in UEFA Europa League)	0	—		15	1
Lech Poznań	Total		13	1	1	0	3	0	0	0	17	1
Warta Poznań (loan)	2011–12	I liga	27	1	0	0	—		—		27	1
Legia Warsaw	2012–13	Ekstraklasa	12	0	0	0	—		—		12	0
Legia Warsaw	2013–14	Ekstraklasa	18	1	1	0	8 (Note: Five appearances in UEFA Champions League, three appearances in UEFA Europa League)	0	—		27	1
Legia Warsaw	2014–15	Ekstraklasa	16	0	2	0	1 (Note: Appearance(s) in UEFA Champions League)	0	1 (Note: Appearance in Polish Super Cup)	0	20	0
Legia Warsaw	2015–16	Ekstraklasa	16	0	4	0	8	0	0	0	28	0
Legia Warsaw	2016–17	Ekstraklasa	11	0	0	0	9	0	1	0	21	0
Legia Warsaw	Total		73	1	7	0	26	0	2	0	108	2
Sampdoria	2016–17	Serie A	13	0	1	0	—		—		14	0
Sampdoria	2017–18	Serie A	31	0	0	0	—		—		31	0
Sampdoria	2018–19	Serie A	27	0	1	0	—		—		28	0
Sampdoria	2019–20	Serie A	28	0	1	0	—		—		29	0
Sampdoria	2020–21	Serie A	31	1	1	0	—		—		32	1
Sampdoria	2021–22	Serie A	35	0	2	0	—		—		37	0
Sampdoria	2022–23	Serie A	15	0	1	0	—		—		16	0
Sampdoria	2023–24	Serie B	1	0	1	0	—		—		2	0
Sampdoria	2024–25	Serie B	21	0	2	0	—		0	0	23	0
Sampdoria	Total		202	1	10	0	—		0	0	212	1
Napoli (loan)	2022–23	Serie A	3	0	1	0	0	0	—		4	0
Empoli (loan)	2023–24	Serie A	24	0	0	0	—		—		24	0
Palermo	2025–26	Serie B	20	0	0	0	—		0	0	20	0
Motor Lublin	2026–27	Ekstraklasa	0	0	0	0	—		—		0	0
Career total			361	4	19	0	29	0	2	0	411	4

=== International ===
As of match played 17 November 2025

Appearances and goals by national team and year
National team	Year	Apps	Goals
Poland	2013	1	0
Poland	2014	1	0
Poland	2015	0	0
Poland	2016	1	0
Poland	2017	3	0
Poland	2018	10	0
Poland	2019	6	0
Poland	2020	6	0
Poland	2021	11	0
Poland	2022	11	0
Poland	2023	4	0
Poland	2024	3	0
Poland	2025	2	0
Total		59	0

== Honours ==
Lech Poznań

- Ekstraklasa: 2009–10

Legia Warsaw

- Ekstraklasa: 2012–13, 2013–14, 2015–16
- Polish Cup: 2012–13, 2014–15, 2015–16
- Polish Super Cup runner-up: 2014, 2015, 2016

Napoli

- Serie A: 2022–23

Individual

- Ekstraklasa Discovery of the Season: 2012–13
