= Romário Vieira =

Bissau-Guinean footballer (born 1998)

Personal information
- Full name: Romário Augusto Vieira Nan
- Date of birth: 19 July 1998 (age 28)
- Place of birth: Bissau, Guinea-Bissau
- Position: Midfielder

Team information
- Current team: Wakefield

Youth career
- 2007–2009: Imortal
- 2009–2010: CB Portimão
- 2010–2011: Ferreiras
- 2015–2016: Tadcaster Albion
- 2016–2018: Leeds United

Senior career*
| Years | Team | Apps | (Gls) |
| 2018 | Leeds United | 0 | (0) |
| 2020–2022 | Tadcaster Albion | 10 | (2) |
| 2023 | Wakefield | 2 | (0) |
| 2024– | Yorkshire Amateur | 4 | (0) |

International career^{‡}
| 2018 | Guinea-Bissau | 1 | (0) |
- * Club domestic league appearances and goals as of 23:58, 3 November 2020 (UTC) ‡ National team caps and goals as of 10:16, 23 March 2018 (UTC)

Romário Augusto Vieira Nan (born 19 July 1998) is a semi-professional footballer who plays as a midfielder for Yorkshire Amateur. Born in Guinea-Bissau, he has a single cap for the national team and also holds Portuguese and English nationality.

== Club career ==
=== Early career ===
Vieira spent his early life in Guinea-Bissau and Portugal with his twin brother Ronaldo. His family relocated to England in 2011. He played for Whitley Bay Boys Club, a local team near Newcastle. Vieira's family then moved to Yorkshire and Romário played two seasons in the Huddersfield Junior Football league for Batley Phoenix.

Vieira then signed for York-based i2i Football Academy whilst studying at York College. He signed for Northern Premier League side Tadcaster Albion joining their academy.

In 2016, Vieira was offered a contract by Czech side Viktoria Plzeň, but ultimately decided to remain in Yorkshire after being approached by Leeds United.

=== Leeds United ===
On 1 September 2016, he joined Leeds on a one-year deal, linking up with the Under-23 side. This move reunited Vieira with his twin brother, Ronaldo, who was already a first team player with Leeds.

On 31 January 2018, Vieira was named on the Leeds bench for the first time in a 0–0 draw with Hull City, a game that saw Ronaldo start in midfield. This made the Vieira twins just the third set of brothers to feature in a Leeds match day squad, following Eddie and Frank Gray, and Ray and Rod Wallace. Vieira was again named on the bench in the following game, a 1–4 loss against Cardiff City. The match proved to be the last for Leeds head coach Thomas Christiansen who was sacked after the game.

On 18 May 2018, in Leeds' retained list for the 2018–19 season, Leeds announced they would not be renewing Vieira's contract and he would be released upon expiry.

=== Trial spells ===
In July 2018, Vieira joined EFL League One side Doncaster Rovers on trial and was named as a trialist amongst their substitutes bench in a pre-season friendly against Grimsby Town where he played as a substitute. He scored for Doncaster in their pre-season friendly against Deeping Rangers. Vieira was offered permanent terms, but the deal collapsed after he suffered an ankle injury in an academy match.

Vieira had further trials in 2018 with Bradford City and Notts County, but lingering pain from the injury suffered with Doncaster required surgery.

After recovery, Vieira went on trial with Gateshead in summer 2019, but suffered another serious injury in training, this time a torn meniscus. He did rehabilitative work with Italian side Sampdoria, his brother's team.

=== Tadcaster Albion ===
After two years as a free agent, Vieira signed for former youth club and Northern Premier League Division One North West side Tadcaster Albion in October 2020. He made his debut on 24 October 2020 in a 2–1 defeat to Ramsbottom United.

== International career ==
Vieira was eligible to represent Guinea-Bissau, Portugal or England having been educated in the country for five years before the age of 18.

After deciding to represent Guinea-Bissau at international level, he was called up to the national team. On 22 March 2018, Vieira made his debut against Burkina Faso as a substitute in a 2–0 loss.

== Personal life ==
Vieira moved to Portugal at the age of six, shortly after the death of his father. His twin brother, Ronaldo, is a professional footballer who currently plays for the San Jose Earthquakes in North America's Major League Soccer.

Vieira was named after Brazilian footballer Romário, while his brother was named after Brazilian footballer Ronaldo.
