= Ashfield Secondary Modern School =

School in York, England

Coordinates: 53.9294°N 1.1136°W

Ashfield Secondary Modern School was a coeducational secondary modern school in York, England. Its site on the corner of Tadcaster Road and Sim Balk Lane in York was taken over by York Sixth Form College, which later merged with York College of Further and Higher Education to become York College. After many years of use by York College as A-Level classrooms for subjects including art, music, law, politics and mathematics, the Ashfield buildings were demolished in 2005 to make way for a new building for York College, which opened in 2007.

The school had approximately 600 pupils with five year groups of 120 children each. Pupils in each year were split between four 'houses'; Castle (Yellow), Abbey (Red), Priory (Blue), and Minster (Green). The class of 1985 was the last class to complete secondary education at Ashfield. From July 1985, the school was taken over by York College. The last Head-Master of Ashfield was Mr. J.E. Parkinson.

Some of the well known teachers in the school's latter years were: Mr Cavanagh Art and Engineering drawing Mr Long Woodwork Mr Cooley Metalwork Mr Key Plasticwork Mr Milner (English) Mr Middleton (Physics) Mr Clarke (Maths) Mr Newstead (Biology) Mr Medd (PE) Mr Johnson (History & PE) Mr Evans (History) Mrs Pavor (English) Mr Dorman (Chemistry) Mrs Hopkins (Art) Mrs Jefferies (Geography) Mr Murgatroyd (Music) Mr Hird. English
