= York College (York) =

College in North Yorkshire, England

York College & University Centre

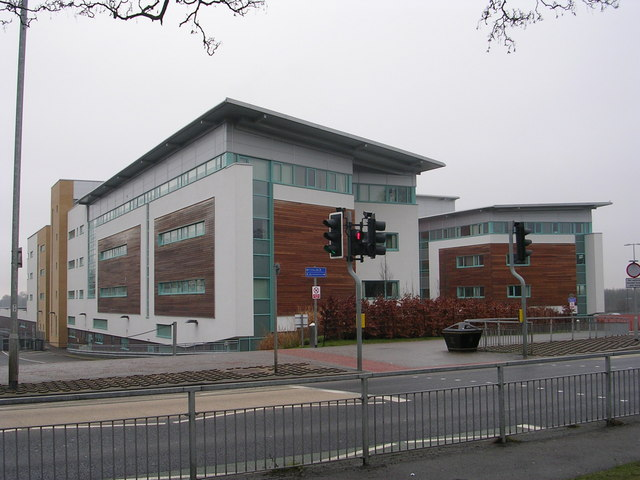

Location
- Sim Balk Lane, Bishopthorpe; York, North Yorkshire, YO23 2BB; England; 53.929645°N 1.112730°W

Information
- Type: further education/higher education college
- Established: 1999; 27 years ago
- Department for Education URN: 130594 Tables
- Ofsted: Reports
- Principal: Ken Merry
- Gender: Mixed
- Age: 16+
- Website: www.yorkcollege.ac.uk

York College & University Centre, formerly York College, is a further and higher education college in York, England. Its antecedent is the York Mechanics' Institute, founded in 1827; the college in its current form was established in 1999 through a merger of York Sixth Form College and York College of Further and Higher Education. The latter was previously York College of Arts and Technology, after the York College of Art was merged into this campus in 1976. In 2024 the college was rebranded as York College & University Centre, with the York College of Art once again assuming its historical name.

== History ==
The York Mechanics' Institute was founded in 1827 and taught art and science classes. By 1877, the institute had a library that contained over 10,000 volumes. In 1891, a technical school was founded by the City of York Council and this took over teaching from the Mechanics' Institute which was dissolved in 1892 with its library and many of the books being handed over to the council.

The York School of Art was established in 1842 on Little Blake Street, moving several times around the city before becoming part of the York College of Arts and Technology at the Tadcaster Road site in 1976. It has been known by a number of names through its history, including School of Design, School of Art, School of Arts and Crafts, Art and Design, and Fine Art Design and Crafts

The college was established in its present form in 1999 by a merger of York Sixth Form College and York College of Further and Higher Education, which had been known as York College of Arts and Technology. A £60 million redevelopment of the former sixth form college site began in 2005, and the present campus opened in September 2007. During the development, concerns were raised about the impact on traffic. The site would cater for 13,000 students based across North Yorkshire and the East Riding of Yorkshire. The Learning and Skills Council contributed £21 million funding to the project, with the rest of the costs being met through the sale of the former site on Tadcaster Road. The buildings had replaced what was formerly the Ashfield Secondary Modern School, before the sixth form opened on the site in 1985. During the redevelopment all the students were based on the further and higher education site at Tadcaster Road, which was afterwards demolished to make way for housing.

The Fine Art, Design and Craft Department, as part of York College, began offering degrees in art and design in 2003, starting with a BA (Hons) in graphic design. In 2005 a BA (Hons) in Contemporary Crafts followed, and in 2007, foundation degrees in fashion and creative digital communications. In 2007, the department moved into a purpose-built building on Sim Balk Lane, where it remains today.

A December 2013 Ofsted inspection report rated the college "outstanding" in terms of its overall effectiveness.

In September 2015, York College opened a building dedicated to construction and skills as part of its main campus. The site was officially opened by Nick Boles on 14 March 2016.

In 2020, York College was granted the status of "University Centre", for its provision of higher education. In 2024, the York School of Art was relaunched as part of "York College & University Centre", led by principal Ken Merry.

== Schools and courses ==
York College offers A-Levels, vocational courses, T-Levels, apprenticeships, higher education, and adult learning courses.

The York College of Art remains in Sim Balk Lane, and As of 2024 offers five BA (Hons) degrees and a foundation course, as well as various adult education courses.

=== Rating ===
In June 2017, the college was rated as "silver" by the Teaching Excellence Framework according to its standard of undergraduate teaching. This was again confirmed in 2023 when the Office for Students undertook a reaccreditation activity.

=== Partnership ===
In April 2012, York College and York St. John University formed a partnership in an attempt to "maximise opportunities" for students and provide a clear progression route, starting from pre-degree through to postgraduate level. Despite this partnership no longer formally being in place, the college and York St. John University still work closely together. Since 2019, the college has delivered higher education programmes that are validated by the Open University

In January 2026, York College was named as one of the principle sponsors of York Knights and York Valkyrie for the 2026 Super League campaigns.

In June 2026, York College was named as a key sponsor of York City F.C. and the logo of the college was confirmed as the back of the shirt sponsor for the 2026/27 season which saw York City return to the football league.

== Notable former pupils ==
- Taj Atwal, actress
- Donna Preston, actress
- Carla Woodcock, actress
- Romário Vieira, professional footballer
- Ronaldo Vieira, professional footballer
- Ben Godfrey, professional footballer
- Rachel Daly, professional footballer
- Nadia Stacey, Oscar-winning make-up artist
- Ed Winters, vegan activist

== See also ==
- University of York
- York St John University
