= Ronaldo Vieira (footballer, born 1998) =

Bissau-Guinean footballer (born 1998)

Personal information
- Full name: Ronaldo Augusto Vieira Nan
- Date of birth: 19 July 1998 (age 28)
- Place of birth: Bissau, Guinea-Bissau
- Height: 1.78 m (5 ft 10 in)
- Position: Defensive midfielder

Team information
- Current team: San Jose Earthquakes
- Number: 14

Youth career
- 2009–2010: CB Portimão
- 2010–2011: Benfica
- 2011–2012: Whitley Bay Boys Club
- 2012–2014: Batley Phoenix
- 2014–2015: i2i Football Academy
- 2015–2016: Leeds United

Senior career*
Years	Team	Apps	(Gls)
2016–2018	Leeds United	63	(1)
2018–2025	Sampdoria	102	(0)
2020–2021	→ Hellas Verona (loan)	4	(0)
2023	→ Torino (loan)	2	(0)
2025–	San Jose Earthquakes	28	(0)

International career^{‡}
2017–2019	England U20	13	(0)
2018	England U21	3	(1)
2025–	Guinea-Bissau	1	(0)
- * Club domestic league appearances and goals as of 08:22, 28 September 2026 (UTC) ‡ National team caps and goals as of 19:20, 13 October 2025 (UTC)

Ronaldo Augusto Vieira Nan (Portuguese pronunciation: [ʁuˈnaldu viˈɐjɾɐ]; born 19 July 1998) is a Bissau-Guinean professional footballer who plays as a defensive midfielder for Major League Soccer club San Jose Earthquakes and the Guinea-Bissau national team.

Born in Guinea-Bissau, and also holding Portuguese nationality, he was an England U21 international before switching to Guinea-Bissau.

== Club career ==
=== Early career ===
Vieira was raised in Portugal, where he signed for the academy of Benfica, the club he supported. He left Portugal in 2011 in search of more job opportunities for his family in England.

Vieira began playing football in England when local coach Mark Bryden asked him to sign for Whitley Bay Boys Club, a local team near Newcastle. Vieira then moved to Yorkshire and played two seasons in the Huddersfield Junior Football League for Batley Phoenix under the tutelage of coach Tony Shuttleworth. Vieira also had unsuccessful trials at Premier League sides Manchester City and Hull City.

Vieira then signed for York-based i2i Football Academy under the coaching of Nelly (head coach at i2i) whilst studying at York College. He joined Leeds United on trial in September 2015, after being recommended by his York College and i2i teammate's father, Mark Hamilton. Vieira was due to sign for York City until he was recommended by Mark Hamilton, who is a long time friend of the head of recruitment at Leeds, Terry Potter. Vieira signed for the academy after impressing.

=== Leeds United ===
After impressing for the academy, Vieira signed a two-year professional deal with Leeds on 5 May 2016. Highly rated by then head coach Steve Evans, Vieira was named on the bench for Leeds on 7 May 2016 against Preston North End, and made his debut in the same game coming on as a substitute for Stuart Dallas in a 1–1 draw.

==== 2016–17 season ====
Vieira became a regular starter for the first team during the 2016–17 pre-season under new head coach Garry Monk, including in the final pre season friendly against Serie A side Atalanta, where Vieira received the man of the match award in a 2–1 win.

On 5 August 2016, Vieira was given the squad number 25 shirt for the upcoming 2016–17 season. On 7 August, on the opening day of the 2016–17 season Vieira made his first Leeds start against Queens Park Rangers in a 3–0 defeat, with Vieira also giving away a penalty.

On 1 September 2016, with Vieira now part of Leeds' first-choice central midfield pairing with Liam Bridcutt, it was announced that Ronaldo had signed a new three-year deal with the Elland Road club. It was also confirmed on the same day, that twin brother, Romario Vieira had signed a one-year contract with Leeds after signing from Tadcaster Albion, joining up with the development squad for the 2016–17 campaign.

On 26 October, Vieira scored the winning penalty for Leeds in the club's penalty shootout victory against Norwich City in the English League Cup, after a dramatic 2–2 draw in normal time.

On 5 November, Vieira scored his first goal from open play, once again against Norwich City. His 90th-minute strike from long distance was enough to see Leeds edge out a 3–2 victory at Carrow Road.

After becoming a first team regular and a key player at the club, playing 37 games during the 2016–17 season on 30 April 2017 Vieira was named the Young Player Of The Year at Leeds United's end of season awards. During the course of the season, Vieira was described as a 'wonderkid' by International Business Times.

==== 2017–18 season ====
On 24 May 2017, Vieira was rewarded for his impressive form and signed a new long-term deal at the club signing a 4-year contract to keep him at the club until the end of the 2020–21 season.

He scored his first goal of the 2017–18 season on 22 August 2017, scoring a goal in Leeds' 5–1 EFL Cup victory against Newport County. On 22 November, Vieira received his first professional red card when he was sent off against Wolverhampton Wanderers.

On 31 January 2018, Ronaldo's brother Romario Vieira was named on the substitutes bench for Leeds for the first time against Hull City in Leeds' 0–0 draw, in the process Ronaldo and Romario became the third set of brothers to ever feature in a match day squad for Leeds United after Eddie and Frank Gray, and Ray and Rod Wallace.

On 19 February 2018, Ronaldo Vieira was named '20th' in the most promising under 20 prospects in the whole of Europe, Vieira featured in a prestigious list by CIES with the likes of AC Milan Goalkeeper Gianluigi Donnarumma featuring in 1st place and PSG Striker Kylian Mbappe in 3rd place.

On 16 April 2018, Vieira was nominated as one of four players for Leeds United's Young Player of The Year award but lost out to Bailey Peacock-Farrell who won the Young Player of the Year award at Leeds' annual award ceremony.

==== 2018–19 season ====
With a delayed return to the start of pre-season under new Leeds Head Coach Marcelo Bielsa after Vieira participated for England U21's in the 2018 Toulon Tournament, Vieira was named as captain for Leeds in their pre-season friendly 1–1 draw against York City on 20 July 2018, where he played in an unfamiliar new centre-back role. He also captained the side vs Oxford United and Guiseley. On 26 July 2018, he was given the number 8 shirt for the upcoming 2018–19 season for Leeds.

=== Sampdoria ===
On 30 July 2018, Leeds accepted a bid from Serie A side U.C. Sampdoria for Vieira, with Vieira flying to Italy to complete a medical and discuss personal terms. with the Italian side looking to replace departed midfielder Lucas Torreira. On 1 August, the move was made official as he joined Sampdoria on a five-year contract for an undisclosed fee, with the Yorkshire Evening Post reporting the fee was over £7 million.

In October 2019 he was subjected to racist taunts from opposition fans.

==== Loan to Verona ====
On 3 October 2020, Vieira joined Hellas Verona on loan until 30 June 2021 with an option to buy.

==== Loan to Torino ====
On 31 January 2023, Vieira extended his contract with Sampdoria until 2027 and was loaned to Torino, with an option to buy.

=== San Jose Earthquakes ===
On 7 August 2025, Viera signed an 18-month deal with Major League Soccer side San Jose Earthquakes. At the start of the 2026 season, he was granted the captaincy.

== International career ==
Vieira is eligible to represent Guinea-Bissau, Portugal or England having been educated in the country for five years before the age of 18.

On 28 January 2017, when asked whom he would like to represent, Vieira said that his first choice would be to play for the Portugal national side, however he was open to the idea of playing for England.

On 16 May 2017, Vieira was called up to the England U20 squad for the 2017 Toulon Tournament. Vieira was a regular starter in the tournament, he also played a key role for England on 10 June when he scored the winning penalty in the final against Ivory Coast U20s which saw England U20s crowned the 2017 Toulon Tournament Champions after winning 5–3 on penalties after a 1–1 draw.

After his England U20 call-up, Vieira told the Yorkshire Evening Post in July 2017 that he had changed his preference from playing for Portugal because he had been living in England for a long time, and following discussions with family members who live in Portugal. He said that 'the decision was mine so I picked England'.

Vieira received his first call up to England U21s on 21 May 2018 for the Toulon Tournament with England's group containing fixtures against Qatar U21s, China U21s and Mexico U21s. On 1 June, Vieira scored on his England U21s debut with a long range strike against Qatar U21s in a 4–0 victory. On 9 June 2018, Vieira started in the 2018 Toulon Tournament final against Mexico U21s with England winning the tournament after beating Mexico 2–1 in the final.

On 30 October 2025, Vieira earned his first call-up to the Guinea Bissau national team.

== Personal life ==
Vieira moved to Portugal at the age of five, shortly after the death of his father.

Ronaldo Vieira and his twin brother Romario were named after Brazil footballers, Ronaldo and Romário. Romario is also a footballer and joined his brother at Leeds United on 1 September 2016.

He went to high school at Primrose High School (now Co-operative Academy Leeds).

Ronaldo's brother Romario Vieira represents the Guinea Bissau national side.

== Career statistics ==
As of match played 6 April 2025

Appearances and goals by club, season and competition
Club	Season	League			National Cup		League Cup		Other		Total	
Club	Season	Division	Apps	Goals	Apps	Goals	Apps	Goals	Apps	Goals	Apps	Goals
Leeds United	2015–16	Championship	1	0	0	0	0	0	—		1	0
Leeds United	2016–17	Championship	34	1	0	0	4	0	—		38	1
Leeds United	2017–18	Championship	28	0	0	0	4	1	—		32	1
Leeds United	Total		63	1	0	0	8	1	—		71	2
Sampdoria	2018–19	Serie A	14	0	1	0	—		—		15	0
Sampdoria	2019–20	Serie A	27	0	2	0	—		—		29	0
Sampdoria	2021–22	Serie A	14	0	1	0	—		—		15	0
Sampdoria	2022–23	Serie A	16	0	1	0	—		—		17	0
Sampdoria	2023–24	Serie B	13	0	1	0	—		0	0	14	0
Sampdoria	2024–25	Serie B	12	0	3	0	—		—		15	0
Sampdoria	Total		96	0	9	0	—		—		105	0
Hellas Verona (loan)	2020–21	Serie A	4	0	1	1	—		—		5	1
Torino (loan)	2022–23	Serie A	2	0	0	0	—		—		2	0
Career total			165	1	10	1	8	1	0	0	183	3

== Honours ==
England U20

- Toulon Tournament: 2017

England U21

- Toulon Tournament: 2018

Individual

- Leeds United Young Player of the Year: 2016–17
