= Richard Douglas (civil servant) =

British civil servant

Sir Richard Philip Douglas CB (born 20 November 1956 in York, Yorkshire) is a British former senior civil servant and influential health leader. He previously served as Director General for Finance, Strategy and the NHS at the Department of Health.

== Early life ==
Douglas attended Archbishop Holgate's School in York, and after completing his A-levels, he studied for a BA in English Literature at the University of Hull. After graduating, he married in 1978 and embarked upon his civil service career the same year.

== Civil Service career ==
Douglas started his career in public sector finance in 1978 with HM Customs and Excise, and later the National Audit Office (NAO) where he qualified as an accountant (CIPFA) in 1983. He is a member of the Chartered Institute of Public Finance and Accountancy. In his time with the NAO, he worked in most areas of central government: health, employment, home affairs, defence and agriculture.

Prior to 2001, when he was appointed as NHS finance director, Douglas was finance director at National Savings.

Retiring from the civil service in April 2015, Douglas was the longest-serving Director General of Finance in the UK Government, having served since 2007. From 2011 to 2014, Douglas also served as head of the Government Finance Profession, a position appointed by HM Treasury. He was said by the Health Service Journal to be the twelfth most powerful person in the English NHS in December 2013.

In March 2016, Douglas became deputy chair of NHS Improvement. During this time, he stepped in as interim chair from July to October 2017. In June 2018, he was appointed as a non-executive director at NHS England. He stepped down from the NHS England and NHS Improvement boards in March 2020.

Since 2020, he has chaired the South East London integrated care system (ICS), where he is responsible for overseeing healthcare planning and delivery.

== Personal life ==
Douglas is married with three children.

== Honours and awards ==
In 2003 he was awarded membership of The Gild of Freemen of the City of York, the city in which he was born.

In the 2006 New Year Honours he was made a companion of the Order of the Bath (CB). He was knighted in the 2024 Birthday Honours.
