= Cristian Hadžiosmanović =

Italian-born Montenegrin footballer (born 1998)

Personal information
- Date of birth: 9 July 1998 (age 28)
- Place of birth: Lecce, Italy
- Height: 1.79 m (5 ft 10 in)
- Position: Defender

Team information
- Current team: Taranto
- Number: 98

Youth career
- –2012: Lecce
- 2012–2017: Milan

Senior career*
Years	Team	Apps	(Gls)
2017–2021	Sampdoria	0	(0)
2017–2018	→ Livorno (loan)	2	(0)
2018	→ Reggina (loan)	16	(1)
2018–2019	→ Vis Pesaro (loan)	28	(1)
2019–2020	→ Monopoli (loan)	26	(1)
2020–2021	→ Casertana (loan)	30	(0)
2021–2022	Teramo	35	(1)
2022–2023	Fidelis Andria	16	(0)
2023–2024	Potenza	49	(2)
2024–2025	Pineto	33	(0)
2025–	Taranto	0	(0)

International career
2016	Montenegro U19	5	(1)
- * Club domestic league appearances and goals as of 27 April 202

Cristian Hadžiosmanović (Serbian Cyrillic: Хаџиосмановић, pronounced [xadʒiǒsmanoʋitɕ]; born 9 July 1998) is an Italian-born Montenegrin footballer who plays as a defender for Italian Eccellenza Apulia club Taranto.

== Club career ==
He made his Serie C debut for Livorno on 22 October 2017 in a game against Giana Erminio.

On 24 July 2019, he joined Serie C club Monopoli on loan.

On 12 September 2020 he moved on loan to Casertana.

On 5 August 2021, he moved to Serie C club Teramo on a permanent basis, signing a one-year deal.

On 19 July 2022, Hadžiosmanović signed with Fidelis Andria.

On 3 January 2023, Hadžiosmanović joined Potenza on a contract until 30 June 2024.

On 13 September 2025, Hadžiosmanović moved to Taranto in the fifth-tier Eccellenza Apulia.

== Career statistics ==
As of 3 May 2024

Appearances and goals by club, season and competition
Club	Season	League			Cup		Total	
Club	Season	Division	Apps	Goals	Apps	Goals	Apps	Goals
Livorno (loan)	2017–18	Serie C	2	0	—		2	0
Reggiana (loan)	2017–18	Serie C	16	1	—		16	1
Vis Pesaro (loan)	2018–19	Serie C	28	1	—		28	1
Monopoli (loan)	2019–20	Serie C	26	1	3	0	29	1
Casertana (loan)	2020–21	Serie C	31	0	—		31	0
Teramo	2021–22	Serie C	35	1	—		35	1
Fidelis Andria	2022–23	Serie C	16	0	—		16	0
Potenza	2022–23	Serie C	16	0	—		16	0
Potenza	2023–24	Serie C	33	1	—		33	1
Potenza	Total		49	1	0	0	49	1
Career Total			203	6	3	0	206	6
