= 2023–24 Genoa CFC season =

Genoa
2023–24 season
- Chairman: Alberto Zangrillo
- Head coach: Alberto Gilardino
- Stadium: Stadio Luigi Ferraris
- Serie A: 11th
- Coppa Italia: Round of 16
- Top goalscorer: League: Albert Guðmundsson (14); All: Albert Guðmundsson (16)
Home colours	Away colours	Third colours

The 2023–24 season was Genoa CFC's 130th season in existence and first season back in the Serie A after a year of absence. They also competed in the Coppa Italia.

== Players ==
=== First-team squad ===
As of 6 February 2024

Note: Flags indicate national team as defined under FIFA eligibility rules; some limited exceptions apply. Players may hold more than one non-FIFA nationality.

No.	Pos.	Nation	Player
1	GK	ESP	Josep Martínez
2	MF	NOR	Morten Thorsby (on loan from Union Berlin)
3	DF	ESP	Aarón Martín
4	DF	BEL	Koni De Winter (on loan from Juventus)
5	MF	NOR	Emil Bohinen (on loan from Salernitana)
8	MF	NED	Kevin Strootman
9	FW	POR	Vitinha (on loan from Marseille)
10	FW	BRA	Junior Messias
11	FW	ISL	Albert Guðmundsson
13	DF	ITA	Mattia Bani (vice-captain)
14	DF	ITA	Alessandro Vogliacco
16	GK	ITA	Nicola Leali
17	MF	UKR	Ruslan Malinovskyi

No.	Pos.	Nation	Player
18	FW	GHA	Caleb Ekuban
19	FW	ITA	Mateo Retegui
20	DF	ITA	Stefano Sabelli
22	DF	MEX	Johan Vásquez
23	DF	ITA	Giorgio Cittadini (on loan from Atalanta)
30	FW	NGR	David Ankeye
32	MF	DEN	Morten Frendrup
33	DF	URU	Alan Matturro
39	GK	ITA	Daniele Sommariva
47	MF	CRO	Milan Badelj (captain)
55	DF	SUR	Ridgeciano Haps (on loan from Venezia)
90	DF	ENG	Djed Spence (on loan from Tottenham Hotspur)
99	GK	AUT	Franz Stolz

=== Out on loan ===
As of 6 February 2024

Note: Flags indicate national team as defined under FIFA eligibility rules; some limited exceptions apply. Players may hold more than one non-FIFA nationality.

No.	Pos.	Nation	Player
—	DF	ALB	Brayan Boci (at Legnago until 30 June 2024)
—	DF	GER	Lennart Czyborra (at PEC Zwolle until 30 June 2024)
—	DF	ITA	Paolo Gozzi (at Red Star until 30 June 2024)
—	DF	SUI	Silvan Hefti (at Montpellier until 30 June 2024)
—	DF	ITA	Alessandro Marcandalli (at Reggiana until 30 June 2024)
—	DF	CRO	Marko Pajač (at Reggiana until 30 June 2024)
—	DF	ITA	Federico Valietti (at Taranto until 30 June 2024)
—	MF	ITA	Federico Accornero (at Pescara until 30 June 2024)
—	MF	ITA	Mattia Aramu (at Bari until 30 June 2024)
—	MF	ITA	Francesco Cassata (at Spezia until 30 June 2024)
—	MF	ITA	Luca Chierico (at Gubbio until 30 June 2024)
—	MF	POL	Filip Jagiełło (at Spezia until 30 June 2024)

No.	Pos.	Nation	Player
—	MF	ITA	Patrizio Masini (at Ascoli until 30 June 2024)
—	MF	ITA	Filippo Melegoni (at Reggiana until 30 June 2024)
—	MF	ITA	Manolo Portanova (at Reggiana until 30 June 2024)
—	FW	POL	Aleksander Buksa (at WSG Tirol until 30 June 2024)
—	FW	ITA	Massimo Coda (at Cremonese until 30 June 2024)
—	FW	ITA	Andrea Favilli (at Ternana until 30 June 2024)
—	FW	ITA	Seydou Fini (at Standard Liège until 30 June 2024)
—	FW	ITA	Daniel Fossati (at Sestri Levante until 30 June 2024)
—	FW	ITA	Elia Petrelli (at Fermana until 30 June 2024)
—	FW	ROU	George Pușcaș (at Bari until 30 June 2024)
—	FW	TUR	Güven Yalçın (at Fatih Karagümrük until 30 June 2024)
—	FW	ITA	Kelvin Yeboah (at Standard Liège until 30 June 2024)

== Transfers ==
=== In ===
Pos.	Player	Transferred from	Fee	Date	Source
DF	(Romania) Radu Drăgușin	(Italy) Juventus	€5,500,000	1 July 2023	
GK	(Spain) Josep Martínez	(Germany) RB Leipzig	€3,500,000	1 July 2023	
DF	(Spain) Aarón Martín	(Germany) Mainz 05	Undisclosed	3 July 2023	
GK	(Italy) Daniele Sommariva	(Italy) Pescara	Undisclosed	5 July 2023	
GK	(Italy) Nicola Leali	(Italy) Ascoli	Undisclosed	5 July 2023	
FW	(Italy) Mateo Retegui	(Argentina) Tigre	€12,000,000	26 July 2023	
MF	(Norway) Morten Thorsby	(Germany) Union Berlin	Loan	1 August 2023	
MF	(Brazil) Junior Messias	(Italy) Milan	Loan	11 August 2023	
DF	(Belgium) Koni De Winter	(Italy) Juventus	Loan	11 August 2023	
FW	(Ukraine) Ruslan Malinovskyi	(France) Marseille	Loan	19 August 2023	
DF	(England) Djed Spence	(England) Tottenham Hotspur	Loan	11 January 2024	
MF	(Brazil) Junior Messias	(Italy) Milan	€3,000,000	13 January 2024	
MF	(Norway) Emil Bohinen	(Italy) Salernitana	Loan	17 January 2024	
FW	(Portugal) Vitinha	(France) Marseille	Loan	1 February 2024	

=== Out ===
Pos.	Player	Transferred to	Fee	Date	Source
GK	(Slovenia) Rok Vodišek	(Slovenia) Rogaška	Free	1 July 2023	
MF	(France) Abdoulaye Touré	Released		1 July 2023	
MF	(Sierra Leone) Yayah Kallon	(Italy) Hellas Verona	€2,800,000	1 July 2023	
DF	(Albania) Brayan Boci	(Italy) Lecco	Loan	17 July 2023	
MF	(Italy) Luca Lipani	(Italy) Sassuolo	€8,000,000	8 August 2023	
MF	(Italy) Stefano Sturaro	(Turkey) Fatih Karagümrük	Free	21 August 2023	
FW	(Italy) Massimo Coda	(Italy) Cremonese	Loan	27 August 2023	
MF	(Italy) Vittorio Parigini	(Italy) Feralpisalò	Undisclosed	28 August 2023	
DF	(Albania) Brayan Boci	(Italy) Legnago Salus	Loan	5 January 2024	
DF	(Romania) Radu Drăgușin	(England) Tottenham Hotspur	€25,000,000	11 January 2024	
MF	(Chile) Pablo Galdames	(Brazil) Vasco da Gama	Undisclosed	5 February 2024	

== Pre-season and friendlies ==
Win Draw Loss

15 July 2023 Friendly	Genoa (Italy)	12–0	(Italy) Fassa Calcio	Moena
17:30 CEST (UTC+2)

22 July 2023 Friendly	Genoa (Italy)	1–4	(Italy) Venezia	Moena
17:00 CEST (UTC+2)	Guðmundsson (penalty missed) 1', 37' (pen.)	Report	Pohjanpalo 2' (pen.); Pierini 26' (pen.); Kofod Andersen 52'; Busio 64'	Stadium: Campo Sportivo Cesare Benatti; Attendance: 2,000; Referee: Aureliano

29 July 2023 Friendly	Genoa (Italy)	1–0	(France) Monaco	Genoa
20:30 CEST (UTC+2)	Guðmundsson 17' (pen.)	Report		Stadium: Stadio Luigi Ferraris

5 August 2023 Friendly	Cremonese (Italy)	0–0	(Italy) Genoa	Cremona
18:30 CEST (UTC+2)		Report		Stadium: Stadio Giovanni Zini

8 September 2023 Friendly	Brescia (Italy)	Cancelled	(Italy) Genoa	Torbole Casaglia
11:00 CEST (UTC+2)		Report		Stadium: centro sportivo di Torbole Casaglia

13 October 2023 Friendly	Genoa (Italy)	4–0	(Italy) Genoa Primavera	Pegli
	Guðmundsson; Pușcaș; Martín	Report		Stadium: centro sportivo Pio-Signorini

== Competitions ==
=== Overall record ===
Competition	First match	Last match	Starting round	Final position	Record							
Competition	First match	Last match	Starting round	Final position	Pld	W	D	L	GF	GA	GD	Win %
Serie A	19 August 2023	24 May 2024	Matchday 1	11th	38	12	13	13	45	45	+0	31.58
Coppa Italia	11 August 2023	5 December 2023	Round of 64	Round of 16	3	2	0	1	6	5	+1	66.67
Total					41	14	13	14	51	50	+1	34.15

Source: Soccerway

=== Serie A ===
==== League table ====
Pos	Team	Pld	W	D	L	GF	GA	GD	Pts
9	Torino	38	13	14	11	36	36	0	53 (Note: Torino finished ahead of Napoli on head-to-head points: Torino 3–0 Napoli, Napoli 1–1 Torino.)
10	Napoli	38	13	14	11	55	48	+7	53
11	Genoa	38	12	13	13	45	45	0	49
12	Monza	38	11	12	15	39	51	−12	45
13	Hellas Verona	38	9	11	18	38	51	−13	38 (Note: Hellas Verona finished ahead of Lecce on head-to-head points: Hellas Verona 2–2 Lecce, Lecce 0–1 Hellas Verona.)

Source: Serie A
Rules for classification: 1) Points; 2) Tiebreaker for Champions team and third relegated team; 3) Head-to-head points; 4) Head-to-head goal difference; 5) Goal difference; 6) Goals scored; 7) Draw.
(Note: Head-to-head record is used only after all the matches between the teams in question have been played)

==== Results summary ====
Overall								Home						Away					
Pld	W	D	L	GF	GA	GD	Pts	W	D	L	GF	GA	GD	W	D	L	GF	GA	GD
38	12	13	13	45	45	0	49	8	6	5	27	22	+5	4	7	8	18	23	−5

Source: Serie A

==== Results by round ====
Round	1	2	3	4	5	6	7	8	9	10	11	12	13	14	15	16	17	18	19	20	21	22	23	24	25	26	27	28	29	30	31	32	33	34	35	36	37	38
Ground	H	A	A	H	A	H	A	H	A	H	A	H	A	H	A	H	A	H	A	H	A	H	A	H	A	H	A	H	A	H	A	A	H	H	A	H	A	H
Result	L	W	L	D	L	W	D	L	L	W	L	W	L	D	L	D	W	D	D	D	W	W	D	L	D	W	L	L	D	D	W	D	L	W	D	W	L	W
Position	19	11	14	13	16	11	14	15	15	14	14	13	15	14	14	14	13	12	12	12	11	11	11	12	12	12	12	12	12	12	12	12	12	12	12	11	11	11

Source: Serie A
A = Away; H = Home; W = Win; D = Draw; L = Loss

==== Matches ====
The league fixtures were unveiled on 5 July 2023.

19 August 2023 1	Genoa	1–4	Fiorentina	Genoa
20:45 CEST (UTC+2)	Retegui (yellow card) 21'; Biraschi 58'; Bani (yellow card) 80'	Report	Biraghi 5', (yellow card) 22'; Bonaventura 11', (yellow card) 34'; González 40'; Mandragora 56'; Milenković (yellow card) 87'	Stadium: Stadio Luigi Ferraris; Attendance: 33,045; Referee: Giovanni Ayroldi

27 August 2023 2	Lazio	0–1	Genoa	Rome
20:45 CEST (UTC+2)	Cataldi (yellow card) 38'; Pellegrini (yellow card) 90+2'; Zaccagni (yellow card) 90+3'; Immobile (yellow card) 90+4'	Report	Retegui 16'; Frendrup (yellow card) 39'; Malinovskyi (yellow card) 61'	Stadium: Stadio Olimpico; Attendance: 40,000; Referee: Livio Marinelli

3 September 2023 3	Torino	1–0	Genoa	Turin
18:30 CEST (UTC+2)	Seck (yellow card) 71'; Pellegri (yellow card) 75'; Radonjić 90+4'	Report	Badelj (yellow card) 19'; Malinovskyi (yellow card) 21'; Strootman (yellow card) 45+1'; Thorsby (yellow card) 78'; Bani (yellow card) 90+1'	Stadium: Stadio Olimpico Grande Torino; Attendance: 24,433; Referee: Daniele Chiffi

16 September 2023 4	Genoa	2–2	Napoli	Genoa
20:45 CEST (UTC+2)	De Winter (yellow card) 32'; Retegui (yellow card) 33', (goal) 56'; Bani 40'; Badelj (yellow card) 75'	Report	Elmas (yellow card) 1'; Raspadori 76'; Cajuste (yellow card) 78'; Politano 84'	Stadium: Stadio Luigi Ferraris; Attendance: 33,275; Referee: Michael Fabbri

22 September 2023 5	Lecce	1–0	Genoa	Lecce
20:45 CEST (UTC+2)	Almqvist (yellow card) 59'; Oudin 83'	Report	De Winter (yellow card) 7'; Martín (yellow card) 9' (yellow-red card) 36'	Stadium: Stadio Via del mare Attendance: 27,053; Referee: Antonio Rapuano

28 September 2023 6	Genoa	4–1	Roma	Genoa
20:45 CEST (UTC+2)	Guðmundsson 5'; Strootman (yellow card) 12'; Sabelli (yellow card) 27'; Retegui 45', (yellow card) 65'; Thorsby 74'; Messias 81'	Report	Cristante 22'; Mancini (yellow card) 42'; Paredes (yellow card) 75'; Aouar (yellow card) 89'	Stadium: Stadio Luigi Ferraris; Attendance: 32,961; Referee: Daniele Orsato

1 October 2023 7	Udinese	2–2	Genoa	Udine
15:00 CEST (UTC+2)	Lucca 23'; Pereyra (yellow card) 35'; Success (yellow card) 43'; Matturro 90+1' (o.g.); Lovrić (red card) 90+4'	Report	Guðmundsson 14', 41'; Martínez (yellow card) 25'; Frendrup (yellow card) 90+6'	Stadium: Stadio Friuli; Attendance: 20,805; Referee: Maurizio Mariani

7 October 2023 8	Genoa	0–1	Milan	Genoa
20:45 CEST (UTC+2)	De Winter (yellow card) 69'; Martínez (yellow card) 86' (yellow-red card) 90+13'	Report	Hernandez (yellow card) 21'; Florenzi (yellow card) 22'; Musah (yellow card) 47'; Adli (yellow card) 62'; Pulisic 87'; Maignan (red card) 90+9'; Tomori (yellow card) 90+11'	Stadium: Stadio Luigi Ferraris; Attendance: 33,205; Referee: Marco Piccinini

22 October 2023 9	Atalanta	2–0	Genoa	Bergamo
18:00 CEST (UTC+2)	Lookman (yellow card) 42', (goal) 68'; Tolói (yellow card) 53'; Hateboer (yellow card) 86'; Zappacosta (yellow card) 90'; Éderson 90+5'	Report	Guðmundsson (yellow card) 56'; Bani (yellow card) 90+7'	Stadium: Gewiss Stadium; Attendance: 14,848; Referee: Livio Marinelli

27 October 2023 10	Genoa	1–0	Salernitana	Genoa
20:45 CEST (UTC+2)	Guðmundsson 35'; Malinovskyi (yellow card) 37'; Bani (yellow card) 42'; De Winter (yellow card) 71'	Report	Maggiore (yellow card) 37'; Bradarić (yellow card) 39'; Gyömbér (yellow card) 70'; Ikwuemesi (yellow card) 86'	Stadium: Stadio Luigi Ferraris; Attendance: 30,904; Referee: Davide Massa

5 November 2023 11	Cagliari	2–1	Genoa	Cagliari
15:00 CET (UTC+1)	Viola 48', (yellow card) 90+3'; Zappa 69'; Goldaniga (yellow card) 72'; Petagna (yellow card) 90+1'; Scuffet (yellow card) 90+7'	Report	Malinovskyi (yellow card) 28'; Guðmundsson 51', (yellow card) 71'	Stadium: Unipol Domus; Attendance: 16,412; Referee: Marco Guida

10 November 2023 12	Genoa	1–0	Hellas Verona	Genoa
20:45 CET (UTC+1)	Drăgușin 44'; Vásquez (yellow card) 49'	Report	Hien (yellow card) 26'; Terracciano (yellow card) 60'; Faraoni (yellow card) 66'; Duda (yellow card) 86'	Stadium: Stadio Luigi Ferraris; Attendance: 30,421; Referee: Daniele Orsato

26 November 2023 13	Frosinone	2–1	Genoa	Frosinone
15:00 CET (UTC+1)	Soulé 34'; Oyono (yellow card) 58'; Reinier (yellow card) 66'; Monterisi 90+4'	Report	Vogliacco (yellow card) 6'; Sabelli (yellow card) 29'; Malinovskyi 38'; Frendrup (yellow card) 90+1'	Stadium: Stadio Benito Stirpe; Attendance: 13,999; Referee: Luca Zufferli

2 December 2023 14	Genoa	1–1	Empoli	Genoa
15:00 CET (UTC+1)	Malinovskyi 37', (yellow card) 56'; Vogliacco (yellow card) 87'; Badelj (yellow card) 90+2'	Report	Ranocchia (yellow card) 13'; Cancellieri 67'	Stadium: Stadio Luigi Ferraris; Attendance: 30,747; Referee: Gianluca Aureliano

10 December 2023 15	Monza	1–0	Genoa	Monza
15:00 CET (UTC+1)	Kyriakopoulos (yellow card) 65'; Mota 83'	Report	Vásquez (yellow card) 34'; Frendrup (yellow card) 88'	Stadium: Stadio Brianteo; Attendance: 13,283; Referee: Giuseppe Collu

15 December 2023 16	Genoa	1–1	Juventus	Genoa
20:45 CET (UTC+1)	Guðmundsson 48'; Badelj (yellow card) 74'; Malinovskyi (yellow card) 90'	Report	Chiesa 28' (pen.); Danilo (yellow card) 61'; McKennie (yellow card) 70'; Milik (yellow card) 71'	Stadium: Stadio Luigi Ferraris; Attendance: 33,232; Referee: Davide Massa

22 December 2023 17	Sassuolo	1–2	Genoa	Reggio Emilia
18:30 CET (UTC+1)	Laurienté (yellow card) 22'; Pinamonti 28'; Ferrari (yellow card) 39'	Report	Bani (yellow card) 13'; Guðmundsson 64' (pen.); Ekuban 87'	Stadium: Mapei Stadium – Città del Tricolore; Attendance: 11,745; Referee: Marco Guida

29 December 2023 18	Genoa	1–1	Internazionale	Genoa
20:45 CET (UTC+1)	Drăgușin 45+7', (yellow card) 69'; Guðmundsson (yellow card) 67'	Report	Arnautović 42'; Barella (yellow card) 77'; Mkhitaryan (yellow card) 86'	Stadium: Stadio Luigi Ferraris; Attendance: 33,249; Referee: Daniele Doveri

5 January 2024 19	Bologna	1–1	Genoa	Bologna
20:45 CET (UTC+1)	Posch (yellow card) 19'; Zirkzee (yellow card) 88'; De Silvestri 90+5'; Kristiansen (yellow card) 90+7'	Report	Guðmundsson 20'; Vásquez (yellow card) 40'; Retegui (yellow card) 71'; Sabelli (yellow card) 79'; Fabbian (yellow card) 75'	Stadium: Stadio Renato Dall'Ara; Attendance: 25,095; Referee: Andrea Colombo

13 January 2024 20	Genoa	0–0	Torino	Genoa
15:00 CET (UTC+1)	De Winter (yellow card) 44'; Malinovskyi (yellow card) 77'; Martín (yellow card) 80'	Report	Vlašić (yellow card) 16'; Buongiorno (yellow card) 81'	Stadium: Stadio Luigi Ferraris; Attendance: 33,019; Referee: Antonio Giua

21 January 2024 21	Salernitana	1–2	Genoa	Salerno
18:00 CET (UTC+1)	Martegani 2'	Report	Retegui 13'; Frendrup (yellow card) 29'; Badelj (yellow card) 45+1'; Guðmundsson 58' (pen.); Bani (yellow card) 60'; Vogliacco (yellow card) 71'; Martínez (yellow card) 90+1'	Stadium: Stadio Arechi; Attendance: 17,440; Referee: Daniele Orsato

28 January 2024 22	Genoa	2–1	Lecce	Genoa
12:30 CET (UTC+1)	Retegui 70'; Ekuban 76'	Report	Krstović (penalty missed) 18', 31', (yellow card) 57'; Ramadani (yellow card) 90+5'	Stadium: Stadio Luigi Ferraris; Attendance: 32,152; Referee: Luca Pairetto

3 February 2024 23	Empoli	0–0	Genoa	Empoli
15:00 CET (UTC+1)	Walukiewicz (yellow card) 53'; Cambiaghi (yellow card) 75'	Report	De Winter (yellow card) 66' (yellow-red card) 90+2'; Sabelli (yellow card) 73'	Stadium: Stadio Carlo Castellani; Attendance: 10,374; Referee: Ermanno Feliciani

11 February 2024 24	Genoa	1–4	Atalanta	Genoa
18:00 CET (UTC+1)	Strootman (yellow card) 24'; Malinovskyi 51'; Bani (yellow card) 54'; Martín (yellow card) 90+3'	Report	De Ketelaere 22', (yellow card) 24'; Kolašinac (yellow card) 32'; Koopmeiners 55'; De Roon (yellow card) 90+2'; Miranchuk (yellow card) 90+7'; Zappacosta 90+10'; Touré 90+13'	Stadium: Stadio Luigi Ferraris; Attendance: 31,201; Referee: Andrea Colombo

17 February 2024 25	Napoli	1–1	Genoa	Naples
15:00 CET (UTC+1)	Østigård (yellow card) 26'; Kvaratskhelia (yellow card) 42'; Di Lorenzo (yellow card) 54'; Ngonge 90'	Report	Frendrup 47'; Vásquez (yellow card) 50'; Vitinha (yellow card) 90+3'	Stadium: Stadio Diego Armando Maradona; Attendance: 50,000; Referee: Juan Luca Sacchi

24 February 2024 26	Genoa	2–0	Udinese	Genoa
20:45 CET (UTC+1)	De Winter (yellow card) 30'; Retegui 36'; Bani 40'	Report	Gianetti (yellow card) 2'; Kristensen (yellow card) 42' (yellow-red card) 49'; Ebosele (yellow card) 86'	Stadium: Stadio Luigi Ferraris; Attendance: 31,126; Referee: Francesco Fourneau

4 March 2024 27	Internazionale	2–1	Genoa	Milan
20:45 CET (UTC+1)	Dumfries (yellow card) 22'; Asllani 30'; Sánchez 38' (pen.); Martínez (yellow card) 69'	Report	Frendrup (yellow card) 20'; Strootman (yellow card) 47'; Vásquez 54', (yellow card) 61'	Stadium: San Siro; Attendance: 75,421; Referee: Giovanni Ayroldi

9 March 2024 28	Genoa	2–3	Monza	Genoa
20:45 CET (UTC+1)	Sabelli (yellow card) 17'; Guðmundsson (penalty missed) 52', 52'; Vitinha 68'	Report	Pessina 8'; Mota 18'; Đurić (yellow card) 44'; Maldini 79'	Stadium: Stadio Luigi Ferraris; Attendance: 31,171; Referee: Ermanno Feliciani

17 March 2024 29	Juventus	0–0	Genoa	Turin
12:30 CET (UTC+1)	Danilo (yellow card) 39'; Cambiaso (yellow card) 58'; Vlahović (yellow card) 90+2' (yellow-red card) 90+3'	Report	Vitinha (yellow card) 65'	Stadium: Juventus Stadium; Attendance: 40,098; Referee: Antonio Giua

30 March 2024 30	Genoa	1–1	Frosinone	Genoa
15:00 CET (UTC+1)	Guðmundsson 30' (pen.); Retegui (yellow card) 42'; Badelj (yellow card) 45'	Report	Reinier 36'; Zortea (yellow card) 60'	Stadium: Stadio Luigi Ferraris; Attendance: 31,462; Referee: Gianluca Aureliano

7 April 2024 31	Hellas Verona	1–2	Genoa	Verona
18:00 CEST (UTC+2)	Bonazzoli 8'; Centonze (yellow card) 24'; Duda (yellow card) 40'; Serdar (yellow card) 67'	Report	Guðmundsson (yellow card) 25', (goal) 58'; Ekuban 45'	Stadium: Stadio Marcantonio Bentegodi; Attendance: 20,342; Referee: Gianluca Manganiello

15 April 2024 32	Fiorentina	1–1	Genoa	Florence
18:30 CEST (UTC+2)	Ikoné 54'; Ranieri (yellow card) 90+1'	Report	Guðmundsson 42' (pen.); Spence (yellow card) 63'; Bani (yellow card) 90+6'	Stadium: Stadio Artemio Franchi; Attendance: 25,120; Referee: Davide Di Marco

19 April 2024 33	Genoa	0–1	Lazio	Genoa
18:30 CEST (UTC+2)	Vogliacco (yellow card) 87'	Report	Casale (yellow card) 16'; Luis Alberto 67'; Cataldi (yellow card) 87'	Stadium: Stadio Luigi Ferraris; Attendance: 30,697; Referee: Ermano Feliciani

29 April 2024 34	Genoa	3–0	Cagliari	Genoa
20:45 CEST (UTC+2)	Thorsby 17'; Frendrup 27'; Guðmundsson 63'	Report	Shomurodov (yellow card) 58'; Augello (yellow card) 72'	Stadium: Stadio Luigi Ferraris; Attendance: 31,253; Referee: Federico Dionisi

5 May 2024 35	Milan	3–3	Genoa	Milan
18:00 CEST (UTC+2)	Reijnders (yellow card) 43'; Florenzi 45'; Gabbia 72'; Giroud 75'	Report	Retegui 5' (pen.); Ekuban 48'; Thiaw 87' (o.g.); Vásquez (yellow card) 90+4'	Stadium: San Siro; Attendance: 73,901; Referee: Alessandro Prontera

12 May 2024 36	Genoa	2–1	Sassuolo	Genoa
15:00 CEST (UTC+2)	Thorsby (yellow card) 48'; Badelj 56'; Kumbulla 63' (o.g.)	Report	Pinamonti 31' (pen.); Obiang (yellow card) 50'; Doig (yellow card) 75'	Stadium: Stadio Luigi Ferraris; Attendance: 31,412; Referee: Maurizio Mariani

19 May 2024 37	Roma	1–0	Genoa	Rome
20:45 CEST (UTC+2)	Paredes (yellow card) 72' (yellow-red card) 72'; Lukaku 79', (yellow card) 82'	Report		Stadium: Stadio Olimpico; Attendance: 67,334; Referee: Gianluca Manganiello

24 May 2024 38	Genoa	2–0	Bologna	Genoa
20:45 CEST (UTC+2)	Malinovskyi 13'; Vitinha 59'; Leali (yellow card) 67'	Report	El Azzouzi (yellow card) 56'; Castro (yellow card) 64'	Stadium: Stadio Luigi Ferraris; Attendance: 32,255; Referee: Alberto Santoro

=== Coppa Italia ===
11 August 2023 Round of 64	Genoa	4–3	Modena	Genoa
21:00 CEST (UTC+2)	Retegui 1', 57'; Vásquez 45+3'; Frendrup (yellow card) 48'; Guðmundsson 51'; Hefti (yellow card) 90+1'	Report	Manconi 29', (yellow card) 88'; Duca (yellow card) 32'; Tremolada 40'; Gerli (yellow card) 69'; Gargiulo (yellow card) 59', (goal) 77'	Stadium: Stadio Luigi Ferraris; Attendance: 25,000; Referee: Gianluca Aureliano

1 November 2023 Round of 32	Genoa	2–1 (a.e.t.)	Reggiana	Genoa
15:00 CET (UTC+1)	Matturro (yellow card) 18'; Haps 53'; Frendrup (yellow card) 59'; Guðmundsson 99'	Report	Djamanca 37'; Nardi (yellow card) 50'; Cigarini (yellow card) 115'	Stadium: Stadio Luigi Ferraris; Attendance: 12,427; Referee: Alberto Santoro

5 December 2023 Round of 16	Lazio	1–0	Genoa	Rome
21:00 CET (UTC+1)	Guendouzi 5'; Pellegrini (yellow card) 90+4'	Report	Galdames (yellow card) 49'; Fini (yellow card) 86'	Stadium: Stadio Olimpico; Attendance: 38,012; Referee: Juan Luca Sacchi
