= 2022–23 Genoa CFC season =

Genoa
2022–23 season
- President: Alberto Zangrillo
- Head coach: Alexander Blessin (until 6 December); Alberto Gilardino (from 6 December)
- Stadium: Stadio Luigi Ferraris
- Serie B: 2nd (promoted)
- Coppa Italia: Round of 16
- Top goalscorer: League: Albert Guðmundsson (11); All: Albert Guðmundsson (14)
colours	colours	colours

The 2022–23 season was the 129th in the history of Genoa CFC and their first season back in the second division since 2007. The club participated in Serie B and the Coppa Italia.

== Players ==
=== First-team squad ===
As of 26 January 2023

Note: Flags indicate national team as defined under FIFA eligibility rules; some limited exceptions apply. Players may hold more than one non-FIFA nationality.

No.	Pos.	Nation	Player
1	GK	CRO	Adrian Šemper
2	DF	ITA	Stefano Sabelli
3	DF	GER	Lennart Czyborra
4	DF	ITA	Domenico Criscito
5	DF	ROU	Radu Drăgușin (on loan from Juventus)
8	MF	NED	Kevin Strootman (on loan from Marseille)
9	FW	ITA	Massimo Coda
11	MF	ISL	Albert Guðmundsson
13	DF	ITA	Mattia Bani
14	DF	ITA	Alessandro Vogliacco
18	FW	GHA	Caleb Ekuban
22	GK	ESP	Josep Martínez (on loan from RB Leipzig)
24	MF	POL	Filip Jagiełło
25	GK	SLO	Rok Vodišek
27	MF	ITA	Stefano Sturaro (Captain)
31	MF	AUT	Stefan Ilsanker

No.	Pos.	Nation	Player
32	MF	DEN	Morten Frendrup
33	DF	URU	Alan Matturro
35	MF	ITA	Luca Lipani
36	DF	SUI	Silvan Hefti
47	MF	CRO	Milan Badelj
50	FW	TUR	Güven Yalçın
57	FW	ROU	George Pușcaș (on loan from Reading)
68	DF	ITA	Brayan Boci
70	MF	ITA	Mattia Aramu (on loan from Venezia)
77	FW	ROU	Denis Drăguș (on loan from Standard Liège)
82	GK	ITA	Giuseppe Agostino
90	MF	ITA	Manolo Portanova
93	DF	CRO	Marko Pajač
94	MF	FRA	Abdoulaye Touré
99	MF	CHI	Pablo Galdames

=== Out on loan ===
As of 20 January 2023

Note: Flags indicate national team as defined under FIFA eligibility rules; some limited exceptions apply. Players may hold more than one non-FIFA nationality.

No.	Pos.	Nation	Player
—	DF	ITA	Davide Biraschi (at Karagümrük until 10 July 2023)
—	DF	ITA	Paolo Gozzi (at Cosenza until 30 June 2023)
—	DF	ITA	Nicholas Rizzo (at Pro Vercelli until 30 June 2023)
—	DF	ITA	Federico Valietti (at Vicenza until 30 June 2024)
—	FW	ITA	Kelvin Yeboah (at Augsburg until 30 June 2023)
—	DF	MEX	Johan Vásquez (at Cremonese until 30 June 2023)
—	MF	ITA	Luca Chierico (at Piacenza until 30 June 2023)
—	MF	ITA	Patrizio Masini (at Novara until 30 June 2023)
—	MF	ITA	Filippo Melegoni (at Standard Liège until 30 June 2023)
—	MF	ITA	Vittorio Parigini (at Como until 30 June 2023)

No.	Pos.	Nation	Player
—	MF	ITA	Mattia Zennaro (at Feralpisalò until 30 June 2023)
—	MF	POL	Kacper Zielski (at Matera until 30 June 2023)
—	MF	ITA	Francesco Cassata (at Ternana until 30 June 2023)
—	FW	ITA	Flavio Bianchi (at Brescia until 30 June 2023)
—	FW	POL	Aleksander Buksa (at OH Leuven until 30 June 2023)
—	FW	ITA	Giacomo Calò (at Cosenza until 30 June 2023, obligation to buy)
—	FW	ITA	Andrea Favilli (at Ternana until 30 June 2023)
—	FW	SLE	Yayah Kallon (at Verona until 30 June 2023)
—	FW	ITA	Elia Petrelli (at Siena until 30 June 2023)

== Pre-season and friendlies ==
Win Draw Loss

22 July 2022 Friendly	Genoa (Italy)	0–1	(Spain) Mallorca	Schwaz, Austria
17:00 CEST (UTC+2)			Junior 72'	Stadium: Silberstadt Arena Schwaz

27 July 2022 Friendly	Lazio (Italy)	1–4	(Italy) Genoa	Kössen, Austria
17:00 CEST (UTC+2)	Immobile 14'		Coda 5', 18', 51'; Guðmundsson 54' (pen.)	Stadium: Kaiserwinkl Arena; Referee: Felix Brych

22 September 2022 Friendly	Monaco (France)	2–3	(Italy) Genoa	Monaco
11:30 CEST (UTC+2)			Vogliacco; Ilsanker; Yalçın	Stadium: Centre de Performance; Attendance: 0

== Competitions ==
=== Overall record ===
Competition	First match	Last match	Starting round	Final position	Record							
Competition	First match	Last match	Starting round	Final position	Pld	W	D	L	GF	GA	GD	Win %
Serie B	14 August 2022	19 May 2023	Matchday 1	2nd	38	21	11	6	53	28	+25	55.26
Coppa Italia	8 August 2022	12 January 2023	Round of 64	Round of 16	3	2	0	1	4	3	+1	66.67
Total					41	23	11	7	57	31	+26	56.10

Source: Soccerway

=== Serie B ===
==== League table ====
Pos	Team	Pld	W	D	L	GF	GA	GD	Pts	Promotion, qualification or relegation
1	Frosinone (C, P)	38	24	8	6	63	26	+37	80	Promotion to Serie A
2	Genoa (Note: Genoa were deducted one point due to income tax payment irregularities.) (P)	38	21	11	6	53	28	+25	73	Promotion to Serie A
3	Bari	38	17	14	7	58	37	+21	65	Qualification for promotion play-offs semi-finals
4	Parma (Note: Parma were deducted one point for missing the deadline to fulfil obligations for February taxes on the salary bill.)	38	17	10	11	48	39	+9	60 (Note: Parma finished ahead of Cagliari on head-to-head points: Cagliari 1–1 Parma, Parma 2–1 Cagliari.)	Qualification for promotion play-offs semi-finals
5	Cagliari (O, P)	38	15	15	8	50	34	+16	60	Qualification for promotion play-offs preliminary round

Source: Soccerway (in English)
Rules for classification: 1) Points; 2) Head-to-head points; 3) Head-to-head goal difference; 4) Goal difference; 5) Goals scored; 6) Draw.
(C) Champions; (O) Play-off winners; (P) Promoted

==== Results summary ====
Overall								Home						Away					
Pld	W	D	L	GF	GA	GD	Pts	W	D	L	GF	GA	GD	W	D	L	GF	GA	GD
38	21	11	6	53	28	+25	74	12	6	1	29	10	+19	9	5	5	24	18	+6

Source: Serie B

==== Results by round ====
Round	1	2	3	4	5	6	7	8	9	10	11	12	13	14	15	16	17	18	19	20	21	22	23	24	25	26	27	28	29	30	31	32	33	34	35	36	37	38
Ground	A	H	A	H	A	H	A	H	A	A	H	A	H	A	H	H	A	H	A	H	A	H	A	H	A	H	A	H	H	A	H	A	H	A	A	H	A	H
Result	W	D	W	D	L	W	W	D	W	W	D	L	D	L	L	W	D	W	W	W	W	D	L	W	D	W	D	W	W	W	W	D	W	W	D	W	L	W
Position	6	6	2	5	9	5	4	6	5	2	2	3	3	3	5	4	4	4	3	3	3	2	2	2	2	2	2	2	2	2	2	2	2	2	2	2	2	2

Source: Serie B
A = Away; H = Home; W = Win; D = Draw; L = Loss

==== Matches ====
The league fixtures were announced on 15 July 2022.

14 August 2022 1	Venezia	1–2	Genoa	Venice
20:45 CET	Zampano (yellow card) 58'; Busio (yellow card) 61'; Johnsen 68'; Ceccaroni (yellow card) 79'; Črnigoj (yellow card) 90+6'	Report	Portanova 37'; Guðmundsson (yellow card) 54'; Yeboah 87'; Bani (yellow card) 90+4'	Stadium: Stadio Pier Luigi Penzo; Attendance: 5,263; Referee: (Italy) Massimiliano Irrati

20 August 2022 2	Genoa	0–0	Benevento	Genoa
20:45 CET	Pajač (yellow card) 39'; Portanova (yellow card) 62'; Yeboah (yellow card) 90+2'	Report	Viviani (yellow card) 15'; Capellini (yellow card) 32'	Stadium: Stadio Luigi Ferraris; Attendance: 23,000; Referee: (Italy) Ivano Pezzuto

28 August 2022 3	Pisa	0–1	Genoa	Pisa
20:45 CET	Calabresi (yellow card) 40' (yellow-red card) 85'; Nagy (yellow card) 47'; Canestrelli (yellow card) 90'	Report	Pajač (yellow card) 23'; Ekuban 29'; Coda (yellow card) 37'	Stadium: Arena Garibaldi – Stadio Romeo Anconetani; Attendance: 9,842; Referee: (Italy) Daniele Chiffi

3 September 2022 4	Genoa	3–3	Parma	Genoa
16:15 CET	Frendrup 16'; Badelj (yellow card) 27'; Guðmundsson (yellow card) 40' (yellow-red card) 90+2'; Hefti 42'; Coda 51' (pen.); Bani (yellow card) 63'	Report	Inglese 21'; Vázquez (yellow card) 23'; Mihăilă 37'; Jurić (yellow card) 45'; Coulibaly (yellow card) 53'; Estévez 89'; Circati (yellow card) 90+3'	Stadium: Stadio Luigi Ferraris; Attendance: 24,153; Referee: (Italy) Giacomo Camplone

9 September 2022 5	Palermo	1–0	Genoa	Palermo
20:30 CET	Matějů (yellow card) 21'; Brunori (yellow card) 28' (goal) 49'; Štulac (yellow card) 56'	Report	Pajač (yellow card) 44'; Jagiełło (yellow card) 52'; Badelj (yellow card) 64'; Galdames (yellow card) 81'	Stadium: Stadio Renzo Barbera; Attendance: 23,643; Referee: (Italy) Francesco Cosso

17 September 2022 6	Genoa	1–0	Modena	Genoa
16:15 CET	Jagiełło 44'; Drăgușin (yellow card) 76'	Report	Gargiulo (yellow card) 9'; Diaw (yellow card) 41'; Magnino (yellow card) 45'; Silvestri (yellow card) 45+2'; Oukhadda (yellow card) 79'; Cittadini (yellow card) 90'	Stadium: Stadio Luigi Ferraris; Attendance: 23,500; Referee: (Italy) Luca Zufferli

1 October 2022 7	SPAL	0–2	Genoa	Ferrara
14:00 CET	La Mantia (yellow card) 26'; Valzania (yellow card) 36'; Moncini (yellow card) 60'; Meccariello (red card) 76'	Report	Vogliacco (yellow card) 11'; Coda 19'; Ilsanker (yellow card) 31'; Josep Martínez (yellow card) 34'; Guðmundsson 88'	Stadium: Stadio Paolo Mazza; Attendance: 12,257; Referee: (Italy) Andrea Colombo

7 October 2022 8	Genoa	0–0	Cagliari	Genoa
20:30 CET	Frendrup (yellow card) 30'; Strootman (yellow card) 67'; Portanova (yellow card) 90+4'	Report	Deiola (yellow card) 31'; Nández (yellow card) 65'; Falco (yellow card) 85'	Stadium: Stadio Luigi Ferraris; Attendance: 26,042; Referee: (Italy) Matteo Marchetti

15 October 2022 9	Cosenza	1–2	Genoa	Cosenza
14:00 CET	Rispoli (yellow card) 21'; Meroni (yellow card) 37'; Butić 45+7' (pen.)	Report	Bani (yellow card) 23' (yellow-red card) 34'; Coda 31' (pen.); Strootman 37'	Stadium: Stadio San Vito-Gigi Marulla; Attendance: 7,434; Referee: (Italy) Niccolo Baroni

22 October 2022 10	Ternana	1–2	Genoa	Terni
16:15 CET	Favilli 44' (yellow card) 45'	Report	Josep Martínez (yellow card) 44'; Coda 76' (pen.) 78'	Stadium: Stadio Libero Liberati; Attendance: 11,059; Referee: (Italy) Daniele Doveri

29 October 2022 11	Genoa	1–1	Brescia	Genoa
16:15 CET	Jagiełło 31'; Badelj (yellow card) 50' (yellow-red card) 77'	Report	Adorni (yellow card) 36'; Olzer (yellow card) 84'; Cistana 90+4' (yellow card) 90+5'	Stadium: Stadio Luigi Ferraris; Attendance: 27,239; Referee: (Italy) Andrea Colombo

7 November 2022 12	Reggina	2–1	Genoa	Reggio Calabria
20:30 CET	Canotto 15'; Hernani 54' (pen.); Rivas (yellow card) 57'; Ravaglia (yellow card) 83'	Report	Aramu 33'; Sabelli (yellow card) 40'; Bani (yellow card) 40'; Guðmundsson (yellow card) 58'; Yalçın (yellow card) 81'; Strootman (yellow card) 89'; Frendrup (yellow card) 90'	Stadium: Stadio Oreste Granillo; Attendance: 14,005; Referee: (Italy) Fabio Maresca

13 November 2022 13	Genoa	1–1	Como	Genoa
16:15 CET	Coda (yellow card) 16' (goal) 17' (pen.); Sabelli (yellow card) 65'; Strootman (yellow card) 73'	Report	Cesc Fàbregas (yellow card) 54'; Cerri 67' (yellow card) 68'; Parigini (yellow card) 71'; Iovine (yellow card) 75'; Vignali (yellow card) 85'	Stadium: Stadio Luigi Ferraris; Attendance: 24,747; Referee: (Italy) Luca Massimi

27 November 2022 14	Perugia	1–0	Genoa	Perugia
15:00 CET	Olivieri 74' (yellow card) 77'; Santoro (yellow card) 78'; Kouan (yellow card) 84'	Report		Stadium: Stadio Renato Curi; Attendance: 7,924; Referee: (Italy) Federico La Penna

4 December 2022 15	Genoa	0–1	Cittadella	Genoa
15:00 CET	Bani (yellow card) 41'; Hefti (yellow card) 68'; Yalçın (yellow card) 75'	Report	Magrassi (yellow card) 33'; Antonucci 62'; Danzi (yellow card) 83'	Stadium: Stadio Luigi Ferraris; Attendance: 25,000; Referee: (Italy) Luca Pairetto

8 December 2022 16	Genoa	2–0	Südtirol	Genoa
15:00 CET	Guðmundsson (yellow card) 7'; Hefti (yellow card) 47'; Sabelli (yellow card) 52'; Pușcaș 65'; Aramu (yellow card) 79' (goal) 90+3'	Report	Rover (yellow card) 26'; Berra (yellow card) 48'; Marconi (yellow card) 53'	Stadium: Stadio Luigi Ferraris; Attendance: 22,000; Referee: (Italy) Antonio Giua

11 December 2022 17	Ascoli	0–0	Genoa	Ascoli Piceno
15:00 CET	Falasco (yellow card) 69'	Report	Hefti (yellow card) 55'; Pușcaș (yellow card) 57'; Aramu (yellow card) 85'	Stadium: Stadio Cino e Lillo Del Duca; Attendance: 7,072; Referee: (Italy) Daniele Doveri

18 December 2022 18	Genoa	1–0	Frosinone	Genoa
20:45 CET	Guðmundsson 22'; Sturaro (yellow card) 74'	Report	Boloca (yellow card) 59'; Rohdén (yellow card) 67'; Borrelli (yellow card) 71'; Ravanelli (yellow card) 78'	Stadium: Stadio Luigi Ferraris; Attendance: 23,000; Referee: (Italy) Simone Sozza

26 December 2022 19	Bari	1–2	Genoa	Bari
20:30 CET	Cheddira 33'; Benedetti (yellow card) 43'; Folorunsho (yellow card) 50'; Botta (yellow card) 57'; Maita (yellow card) 65'; Bellomo (yellow card) 90+6'	Report	Pușcaș 2'; Aramu (yellow card) 50'; Guðmundsson 58'; Drăgușin (yellow card) 61'	Stadium: Stadio San Nicola; Attendance: 48,827; Referee: (Italy) Maurizio Mariani

16 January 2023 20	Genoa	1–0	Venezia	Genoa
18:45 CET	Pușcaș (yellow card) 62'; Coda 85'; Strootman (yellow card) 90+1'; Sabelli (yellow card) 90+3'; Bani (yellow card) 90+4'	Report	Tessmann (yellow card) 80'; Haps (yellow card) 90+4'	Stadium: Stadio Luigi Ferraris; Attendance: 20,000; Referee: (Italy) Gianpiero Miele

21 January 2023 21	Benevento	1–2	Genoa	Benevento
14:00 CET	Forte (yellow card) 14'; Tello (yellow card) 47' (goal) 58'; Improta (yellow card) 55'; Schiattarella (yellow card) 59'	Report	Ilsanker (yellow card) 1'; Coda 12'; Sabelli (yellow card) 50'; Sturaro (yellow card) 72'; Pușcaș 90+4'	Stadium: Stadio Ciro Vigorito; Attendance: 7,929; Referee: (Italy) Marco Serra

28 January 2023 22	Genoa	0–0	Pisa	Genoa
16:15 CET	Bani (yellow card) 12'; Hefti (yellow card) 32'	Report	Marin (yellow card) 68' (red card) 68'; Nícolas (yellow card) 90+5'	Stadium: Stadio Luigi Ferraris; Attendance: 29,460; Referee: (Italy) Manuel Volpi

5 February 2023 23	Parma	2–0	Genoa	Parma
16:15 CET	Benedyczak 32' (yellow card) 32'; Vázquez 53' (pen.); Zagaritis (yellow card) 89'; Adrián Bernabé (yellow card) 90+8'	Report	Sabelli (yellow card) 25'; Salcedo (yellow card) 82'; Sturaro (yellow card) 90+5'; Criscito (yellow card) 90+8'	Stadium: Stadio Ennio Tardini; Attendance: 14,281; Referee: (Italy) Francesco Fourneau

10 February 2023 24	Genoa	2–0	Palermo	Genoa
20:30 CET	Guðmundsson 25'; Sabelli (yellow card) 31'; Hefti (yellow card) 41'; Jagiełło 90+6'	Report	Segre (yellow card) 75'; Matějů (yellow card) 84'; Nedelcearu (yellow card) 90+4'	Stadium: Stadio Luigi Ferraris; Attendance: 25,185; Referee: (Italy) Livio Marinelli

19 February 2023 25	Modena	2–2	Genoa	Modena
16:15 CET	Magnino (yellow card) 30'; Strizzolo 33'; Pușcaș 55' (o.g.); Poli (yellow card) 57'; Oukhadda (red card) 59'	Report	Drăgușin 6'; Josep Martínez (yellow card) 55'; Aramu (yellow card) 77'; Bani 85'	Stadium: Stadio Alberto Braglia; Attendance: 14,030; Referee: (Italy) Maurizio Mariani

25 February 2023 26	Genoa	3–0	SPAL	Genoa
16:15 CET	Sturaro (yellow card) 18'; Drăgușin 77'; Guðmundsson 90+3'; Salcedo 90+7' (yellow card) 90+7'	Report	Rauti (yellow card) 81'	Stadium: Stadio Luigi Ferraris; Attendance: 24,293; Referee: (Italy) Ivano Pezzuto

1 March 2023 27	Cagliari	0–0	Genoa	Cagliari
20:30 CET	Rog (yellow card) 11'; Goldaniga (yellow card) 30'; Makoumbou (yellow card) 90'	Report	Drăgușin (yellow card) 22'; Sabelli (yellow card) 48'; Vogliacco (yellow card) 51'	Stadium: Unipol Domus; Attendance: 13,520; Referee: (Italy) Paolo Valeri

6 March 2023 28	Genoa	4–0	Cosenza	Genoa
20:30 CET	Drăgușin 33'; Guðmundsson 57'; Pușcaș 59'; Jagiełło 79'	Report	Marras (yellow card) 53'; Zilli (yellow card) 86'	Stadium: Stadio Luigi Ferraris; Attendance: 24,370; Referee: (Italy) Antonio Giua

12 March 2023 29	Genoa	1–0	Ternana	Genoa
16:15 CET	Badelj 13'	Report	Partipilo (yellow card) 39'; Sørensen (yellow card) 87'	Stadium: Stadio Luigi Ferraris; Attendance: 26,470; Referee: (Italy) Giacomo Camplone

18 March 2023 30	Brescia	0–3	Genoa	Brescia
14:00 CET				Stadium: Stadio Mario Rigamonti

31 March 2023 31	Genoa	1–0	Reggina	Genoa
20:30 CET				Stadium: Stadio Luigi Ferraris

10 April 2023 32	Como	2–2	Genoa	Como
15:00 CEST (UTC+2)				Stadium: Stadio Giuseppe Sinigaglia

15 April 2023 33	Genoa	2–0	Perugia	Genoa
14:00 CEST (UTC+2)				Stadium: Stadio Luigi Ferraris

22 April 2023 34	Cittadella	0–1	Genoa	Cittadella
14:00 CEST (UTC+2)				Stadium: Stadio Pier Cesare Tombolato; Referee: Federico Dionisi

=== Coppa Italia ===
8 August 2022 Round of 64	Genoa	3–2	Benevento	Genoa
17:45 CEST (UTC+2)	Guðmundsson 35', 45'; Coda 64' (pen.)	Report	Glik 45+3'; Karić 90+5'	Stadium: Stadio Luigi Ferraris; Referee: Andrea Colombo

18 October 2022 Round of 32	Genoa	1–0	SPAL	Genoa
18:00 CEST (UTC+2)	Guðmundsson 45+1' (pen.); Hefti (yellow card) 77'; Pușcaș (yellow card) 79'	Report	Zanellato (yellow card) 11'; Almici (yellow card) 53'	Stadium: Stadio Luigi Ferraris; Referee: (Italy) Antonio Santoro

12 January 2023 Round of 16	Roma	1–0	Genoa	Rome
21:00 CEST (UTC+2)	Bove (yellow card) 35'; Zaniolo (yellow card) 57'; Dybala 64'	Report	Czyborra (yellow card) 59'; Vogliacco (yellow card) 83'	Stadium: Stadio Olimpico; Referee: Ermanno Feliciani
