= 2021–22 Genoa CFC season =

Genoa
2021–22 season
- President: Enrico Preziosi; Alberto Zangrillo
- Head coach: Davide Ballardini (until 6 November 2021); Andriy Shevchenko (from 7 November 2021 to 15 January 2022); Abdoulay Konko (caretaker, from 15 January 2022 to 19 January 2022); Alexander Blessin (from 19 January 2022)
- Stadium: Stadio Luigi Ferraris
- Serie A: 19th (relegated)
- Coppa Italia: Round of 16
- Top goalscorer: League: Mattia Destro (9); All: Mattia Destro (9)
Home colours	Away colours	Third colours

The 2021–22 season was the 129th season in the existence of Genoa CFC and the club's 15th consecutive season in the top flight of Italian football. In addition to the domestic league, Genoa participated in this season's edition of the Coppa Italia.

== Players ==
=== First-team squad ===
As of 2 February 2022

Note: Flags indicate national team as defined under FIFA eligibility rules; some limited exceptions apply. Players may hold more than one non-FIFA nationality.

No.	Pos.	Nation	Player
1	GK	CRO	Adrian Šemper
3	DF	BEL	Zinho Vanheusden (on loan from Internazionale)
4	DF	ITA	Domenico Criscito (captain)
5	DF	ITA	Andrea Masiello
8	MF	GER	Nadiem Amiri (on loan from Bayer Leverkusen)
9	FW	ITA	Roberto Piccoli (on loan from Atalanta)
10	MF	ITA	Filippo Melegoni (on loan from Atalanta)
11	MF	ISL	Albert Guðmundsson
13	DF	ITA	Mattia Bani
15	DF	MEX	Johan Vásquez
16	DF	ITA	Riccardo Calafiori (on loan from Roma)
17	DF	GER	Lennart Czyborra
18	DF	ITA	Paolo Ghiglione
20	FW	GHA	Caleb Ekuban
22	GK	ITA	Federico Marchetti
23	FW	ITA	Mattia Destro

No.	Pos.	Nation	Player
27	MF	ITA	Stefano Sturaro (vice-captain)
32	MF	DEN	Morten Frendrup
33	MF	BRA	Hernani (on loan from Parma)
36	DF	SUI	Silvan Hefti
44	FW	POL	Aleksander Buksa
45	FW	ITA	Kelvin Yeboah
47	MF	CRO	Milan Badelj
50	MF	ITA	Andrea Cambiaso
52	DF	SRB	Nikola Maksimović
55	DF	NOR	Leo Skiri Østigård (on loan from Brighton & Hove Albion)
57	GK	ITA	Salvatore Sirigu
65	MF	ITA	Nicolò Rovella (on loan from Juventus)
90	MF	ITA	Manolo Portanova
91	FW	SLE	Yayah Kallon
99	MF	CHI	Pablo Galdames

=== Other players under contract ===
As of 31 January 2022

Note: Flags indicate national team as defined under FIFA eligibility rules; some limited exceptions apply. Players may hold more than one non-FIFA nationality.

No. / Pos. / Nation / Player; — / GK / SLO / Rok Vodišek	No. / Pos. / Nation / Player; — / DF / GAM / Fallou Njie

=== Out on loan ===
As of 31 January 2022

Note: Flags indicate national team as defined under FIFA eligibility rules; some limited exceptions apply. Players may hold more than one non-FIFA nationality.

No.	Pos.	Nation	Player
—	GK	ITA	Lorenzo Andrenacci (at Brescia until 30 June 2022)
—	GK	ITA	Alberto Paleari (at Benevento until 30 June 2022)
—	DF	ITA	Davide Biraschi (at Fatih Karagümrük until 30 June 2022)
—	DF	ITA	Antonio Candela (at Cesena until 30 June 2022)
—	DF	ARG	Marcos Curado (at Perugia until 30 June 2022)
—	DF	MDA	Daniel Dumbravanu (at Siena until 30 June 2022)
—	DF	POL	Paweł Jaroszyński (at Salernitana until 30 June 2022)
—	DF	ALB	Luis Mukaj (at Torres until 30 June 2022)
—	DF	ITA	Stefano Sabelli (at Brescia until 30 June 2022)
—	DF	ITA	Laurens Serpe (at Crotone until 30 June 2022)
—	DF	ITA	Federico Valietti (at Pordenone until 30 June 2022)
—	DF	ITA	Alessandro Vogliacco (at Benevento until 30 June 2023)
—	MF	COL	Kevin Agudelo (at Spezia until 30 June 2022)
—	MF	ITA	Francesco Cassata (at Parma until 30 June 2022)
—	MF	POL	Filip Jagiełło (at Brescia until 30 June 2022)
—	MF	ALB	Oscar Malltezi (at Prato until 30 June 2022)

No.	Pos.	Nation	Player
—	MF	FRA	Steeve-Mike Eyango (at Siena until 30 June 2022)
—	MF	ITA	Vittorio Parigini (at Como until 30 June 2022)
—	MF	FRA	Abdoulaye Touré (at Fatih Karagümrük until 30 June 2022)
—	MF	ITA	Mattia Zennaro (at Pergolettese until 30 June 2022)
—	FW	ITA	Flavio Bianchi (at Brescia until 30 June 2022)
—	FW	ITA	Nicolas Boiga (at Montevarchi until 30 June 2022)
—	FW	ECU	Felipe Caicedo (at Internazionale until 30 June 2022)
—	FW	ITA	Giacomo Calò (at Benevento until 30 June 2022)
—	FW	ITA	Giuseppe Caso (at Cosenza until 30 June 2022)
—	FW	FRA	Gabriel Charpentier (at Frosinone until 30 June 2022)
—	FW	ITA	Giordano Conti (at Sanremese until 30 June 2022)
—	FW	BRA	Felipe Estrella (at Catania until 30 June 2022)
—	FW	ITA	Andrea Favilli (at Monza until 30 June 2022)
—	FW	ITA	Elia Petrelli (at Carrarese until 30 June 2022)
—	FW	ARG	Claudio Spinelli (at Oleksandriya until 30 June 2022)

== Transfers ==
=== In ===
No.	Pos.	Player	Transferred from	Fee	Date	Source
3	DF	(Belgium) Zinho Vanheusden	(Italy) Internazionale	Loan	18 July 2021	
57	GK	(Italy) Salvatore Sirigu	(Italy) Torino	Free	3 August 2021	
20	FW	(Ghana) Caleb Ekuban	(Turkey) Trabzonspor	Undisclosed	7 August 2021	
1	GK	(Croatia) Adrian Šemper	(Italy) Chievo	Free	11 August 2021	
36	DF	(Switzerland) Silvan Hefti	(Switzerland) Young Boys	€5M	3 January 2022	
55	DF	(Norway) Leo Skiri Østigård	(England) Brighton & Hove Albion	Loan	5 January 2022	
45	FW	(Italy) Kelvin Yeboah	(Austria) Sturm Graz	€6.5M	8 January 2022	
16	DF	(Italy) Riccardo Calafiori	(Italy) Roma	Loan	14 January 2022	
9	FW	(Italy) Roberto Piccoli	(Italy) Atalanta	Loan	25 January 2022	
8	MF	(Germany) Nadiem Amiri	(Germany) Bayer Leverkusen	Loan	29 January 2022	
11	MF	(Iceland) Albert Guðmundsson	(Netherlands) AZ	Undisclosed	31 January 2022	

=== Out ===
No.	Pos.	Player	Transferred to	Fee	Date	Source
14	FW	(Uzbekistan) Eldor Shomurodov	(Italy) Roma	€17.5M (Note: Initial transfer fee. Includes undisclosed performance-related clauses.)	2 August 2021	
2	DF	(Italy) Stefano Sabelli	(Italy) Brescia	Loan	14 January 2022	
14	DF	(Italy) Davide Biraschi	(Turkey) Fatih Karagümrük	Loan	17 January 2022	
66	DF	(Italy) Laurens Serpe	(Italy) Benevento	Loan	17 January 2022	
8	MF	(Italy) Francesco Cassata	(Italy) Parma	Loan	18 January 2022	
94	MF	(France) Abdoulaye Touré	(Turkey) Fatih Karagümrük	Loan	21 January 2022	
24	FW	(Italy) Flavio Bianchi	(Italy) Brescia	Loan	28 January 2022	
9	FW	(Ecuador) Felipe Caicedo	(Italy) Internazionale	Loan	29 January 2022	
11	MF	(Switzerland) Valon Behrami	(Italy) Brescia	Free	31 January 2022	
19	FW	(North Macedonia) Goran Pandev	(Italy) Parma	Undisclosed	31 January 2022	
21	MF	(Serbia) Ivan Radovanović	(Italy) Salernitana	Free	31 January 2022	

== Pre-season and friendlies ==
Win Draw Loss Fixtures

17 July 2021 Friendly	FC Stubai (Austria)	0–5	(Italy) Genoa	Neustift im Stubaital, Austria
18:00 CEST (UTC+2)				Stadium: Sportplatz Neustift

21 July 2021 Friendly	Wacker Innsbruck (Austria)	1–4	(Italy) Genoa	Neustift im Stubaital, Austria
17:00 CEST (UTC+2)	Gavrić 52'	Report	Destro 4'; Shomurodov 21'; Agudelo 71'; Jagiełło 78'	Stadium: Sportplatz Neustift

24 July 2021 Friendly	Paris Saint-Germain (France)	Cancelled	(Italy) Genoa	Orléans, France
19:00 CEST (UTC+2)				Stadium: Stade de la Source

31 July 2021 Friendly	Mainz 05 (Germany)	3–2	(Italy) Genoa	Mainz, Germany
17:30 CEST (UTC+2)	Burkardt 8'; Boëtius 49'; Szalai 96'	Report	Buksa 30'; Bianchi 77' (pen.)	Stadium: Opel Arena; Attendance: 3,000; Referee: Nicolas Winter
Note: The match was played in four quarters 30 minutes each.

4 September 2021 Friendly	Alessandria (Italy)	3–2	(Italy) Genoa	Alessandria, Italy
15:00 CEST (UTC+2)	Corazza 4'; Palombi 13', 19'		Criscito 21'; Destro 81'	Stadium: Stadio Giuseppe Moccagatta

== Competitions ==
=== Overall record ===
Competition	First match	Last match	Starting round	Final position	Record							
Competition	First match	Last match	Starting round	Final position	Pld	W	D	L	GF	GA	GD	Win %
Serie A	21 August 2021	21 May 2022	Matchday 1	19th	38	4	16	18	27	60	−33	10.53
Coppa Italia	13 August 2021	13 January 2022	First round	Round of 16	3	2	0	1	5	5	+0	66.67
Total					41	6	16	19	32	65	−33	14.63

Source: Soccerway

=== Serie A ===
==== League table ====
Pos	Team	Pld	W	D	L	GF	GA	GD	Pts	Qualification or relegation
16	Spezia	38	10	6	22	41	71	−30	36	
17	Salernitana	38	7	10	21	33	78	−45	31	
18	Cagliari (R)	38	6	12	20	34	68	−34	30	Relegation to Serie B
19	Genoa (R)	38	4	16	18	27	60	−33	28	Relegation to Serie B
20	Venezia (R)	38	6	9	23	34	69	−35	27	Relegation to Serie B

Source: Serie A
Rules for classification: 1) Points; 2) Head-to-head points; 3) Head-to-head goal difference; 4) Goal difference; 5) Goals scored; 6) Draw. (Note: Head-to-head record is used only after all the matches between the teams in question have been played)
(R) Relegated

==== Results summary ====
Overall								Home						Away					
Pld	W	D	L	GF	GA	GD	Pts	W	D	L	GF	GA	GD	W	D	L	GF	GA	GD
38	4	16	18	27	60	−33	28	3	8	8	14	25	−11	1	8	10	13	35	−22

Source: Serie A

==== Results by round ====
Round	1	2	3	4	5	6	7	8	9	10	11	12	13	14	15	16	17	18	19	20	21	22	23	24	25	26	27	28	29	30	31	32	33	34	35	36	37	38
Ground	A	H	A	H	A	H	A	H	A	A	H	A	H	A	H	A	H	A	H	A	H	A	H	A	H	A	H	H	A	H	A	H	A	H	A	H	A	H
Result	L	L	W	L	D	D	L	D	L	D	D	D	L	D	L	L	L	L	D	D	L	L	D	D	D	D	D	D	D	W	L	L	L	W	L	W	L	L
Position	20	19	13	15	16	16	16	18	18	18	17	17	18	18	18	18	18	18	18	19	19	19	19	19	19	19	19	19	19	18	19	18	18	18	19	19	19	19

Source: Serie A
A = Away; H = Home; W = Win; D = Draw; L = Loss

==== Matches ====
The league fixtures were announced on 14 July 2021.

21 August 2021 1	Internazionale	4–0	Genoa	Milan
18:30 CEST (UTC+2)	Škriniar 6'; Çalhanoğlu 14'; Vidal 74'; Vecino (yellow card) 78'; Džeko 88'	Report	Criscito (yellow card) 1'; Sturaro (yellow card) 66'	Stadium: San Siro; Attendance: 27,402; Referee: Valerio Marini

29 August 2021 2	Genoa	1–2	Napoli	Genoa
18:30 CEST (UTC+2)	Ekuban (yellow card) 11'; Criscito (yellow card) 51'; Cambiaso 69'	Report	Fabián 39'; Di Lorenzo (yellow card) 45'; Politano (yellow card) 49'; Petagna 84'; Mário Rui (yellow card) 90'	Stadium: Stadio Luigi Ferraris; Attendance: 6,000; Referee: Marco Di Bello

12 September 2021 3	Cagliari	2–3	Genoa	Cagliari
15:00 CEST (UTC+2)	João Pedro 16' (pen.), (yellow card) 62'; Ceppitelli (yellow card) 35', (goal) 56'	Report	Biraschi (yellow card) 11'; Sabelli (yellow card) 15'; Kallon (yellow card) 59'; Destro 59'; Fares 69', 78'	Stadium: Sardegna Arena; Attendance: 6,423; Referee: Luca Pairetto

18 September 2021 4	Genoa	1–2	Fiorentina	Genoa
15:00 CEST (UTC+2)	Touré (yellow card) 13'; Criscito (yellow card) 15', (goal) 90+8' (pen.); Vanheusden (yellow card) 20'; Behrami (yellow card) 66'	Report	Odriozola (yellow card) 36'; Biraghi (yellow card) 45+3'; Martínez Quarta (yellow card) 54'; Saponara 60'; Kokorin (yellow card) 85'; Bonaventura 89'	Stadium: Stadio Luigi Ferraris; Attendance: 6,269; Referee: Livio Marinelli

21 September 2021 5	Bologna	2–2	Genoa	Bologna
18:30 CEST (UTC+2)	Domínguez (yellow card) 30'; Hickey 49'; Bonifazi (yellow card) 58'; Medel (yellow card) 71'; Arnautović 85' (pen.)	Report	Farès (yellow card) 43'; Destro 55', (yellow card) 56'; Behrami (yellow card) 60'; Vanheusden (yellow card) 84'; Criscito 89' (pen.)	Stadium: Stadio Renato Dall'Ara; Attendance: 9,707; Referee: Francesco Fourneau

25 September 2021 6	Genoa	3–3	Hellas Verona	Genoa
20:45 CEST (UTC+2)	Maksimović (yellow card) 48'; Behrami (yellow card) 54'; Pandev (yellow card) 55'; Criscito 77' (pen.); Destro 80', 85'	Report	Simeone 8'; Barák 49' (pen.); Günter (yellow card) 57'; Ilić (yellow card) 62'; Kalinić 90+1'	Stadium: Stadio Luigi Ferraris; Attendance: 13,478; Referee: Daniele Doveri

2 October 2021 7	Salernitana	1–0	Genoa	Salerno
15:00 CEST (UTC+2)	Đurić 66'; Gyömbér (yellow card) 89'; Ribéry (yellow card) 90+1'	Report	Maksimović (yellow card) 75'; Cambiaso (yellow card) 84'	Stadium: Stadio Arechi; Attendance: 10,077; Referee: Maurizio Mariani

17 October 2021 8	Genoa	2–2	Sassuolo	Genoa
15:00 CEST (UTC+2)	Destro 27', (yellow card) 72'; Biraschi (yellow card) 35'; Vásquez 90'; Sturaro (yellow card) 90+3'	Report	Scamacca 17', 20'; Frattesi (yellow card) 32'; Chiricheș (yellow card) 36'; Harroui (yellow card) 82'; Toljan (yellow card) 88'	Stadium: Stadio Luigi Ferraris; Attendance: 10,370; Referee: Daniele Chiffi

22 October 2021 9	Torino	3–2	Genoa	Turin
18:30 CEST (UTC+2)	Sanabria 14'; Pobega 31', (yellow card) 88'; Brekalo 77'; Praet (yellow card) 90+3'	Report	Vásquez (yellow card) 64'; Destro 70'; Farès (yellow card) 78'; Caicedo 81'; Kallon (yellow card) 85'	Stadium: Stadio Olimpico Grande Torino; Attendance: 9,881; Referee: Piero Giacomelli

26 October 2021 10	Spezia	1–1	Genoa	La Spezia
18:30 CEST (UTC+2)	Bastoni (yellow card) 55'; Sirigu 66' (o.g.); Provedel (yellow card) 85'	Report	Biraschi (yellow card) 60'; Kallon (yellow card) 65'; Caicedo (yellow card) 79'; Criscito 86' (pen.); Masiello (yellow card) 89'	Stadium: Stadio Alberto Picco; Attendance: 7,283; Referee: Simone Sozza

31 October 2021 11	Genoa	0–0	Venezia	Genoa
15:00 CET (UTC+1)	Biraschi (yellow card) 37'	Report	Mazzocchi (yellow card) 33'; Caldara (yellow card) 43'; Aramu (yellow card) 67'	Stadium: Stadio Luigi Ferraris; Attendance: 7,920; Referee: Maurizio Mariani

5 November 2021 12	Empoli	2–2	Genoa	Empoli
20:45 CET (UTC+1)	Di Francesco 62'; Żurkowski 72'	Report	Criscito 13' (pen.); Rovella (yellow card) 27'; Sturaro (yellow card) 64'; Masiello (yellow card) 74'; Vásquez (yellow card) 83'; Bianchi 89'	Stadium: Stadio Carlo Castellani; Attendance: 5,631; Referee: Luca Pairetto

21 November 2021 13	Genoa	0–2	Roma	Genoa
20:45 CET (UTC+1)	Cambiaso (yellow card) 32'; Badelj (yellow card) 54'; Sabelli (yellow card) 78'	Report	Veretout (yellow card) 40'; Afena-Gyan 82', 90+4', (yellow card) 90'	Stadium: Stadio Luigi Ferraris; Attendance: 14,667; Referee: Massimiliano Irrati

28 November 2021 14	Udinese	0–0	Genoa	Udine
12:30 CET (UTC+1)	Molina (yellow card) 45+2'; Makengo (yellow card) 56'; Pussetto (yellow card) 86'	Report	Vásquez (yellow card) 40'; Sabelli (yellow card) 44'; Ghiglione (yellow card) 86'; Rovella (yellow card) 90+1'	Stadium: Stadio Friuli; Attendance: 11,537; Referee: Francesco Meraviglia

1 December 2021 15	Genoa	0–3	Milan	Genoa
20:45 CET (UTC+1)	Masiello (yellow card) 67'; Rovella (yellow card) 73'	Report	Ibrahimović 10'; Gabbia (yellow card) 32'; Messias 45+2', 61'	Stadium: Stadio Luigi Ferraris; Attendance: 14,000; Referee: Juan Luca Sacchi

5 December 2021 16	Juventus	2–0	Genoa	Turin
20:45 CET (UTC+1)	Cuadrado 9'; Pellegrini (yellow card) 34'; Morata (yellow card) 62'; Kean (yellow card) 74'; Dybala 82'	Report	Cambiaso (yellow card) 50'	Stadium: Juventus Stadium; Attendance: 18,458; Referee: Daniele Chiffi

10 December 2021 17	Genoa	1–3	Sampdoria	Genoa
20:45 CET (UTC+1)	Destro 78'; Ghiglione (yellow card) 84'; Sturaro (yellow card) 90'	Report	Gabbiadini 7', 67'; Thorsby (yellow card) 34'; Caputo 49'; Chabot (yellow card) 90+5'	Stadium: Stadio Luigi Ferraris; Attendance: 19,983; Referee: Daniele Doveri

17 December 2021 18	Lazio	3–1	Genoa	Rome
18:30 CET (UTC+1)	Pedro 36'; Acerbi 75'; Zaccagni 81'	Report	Ghiglione (yellow card) 30'; Vásquez (yellow card) 60'; Portanova (yellow card) 73'; Melegoni 86'	Stadium: Stadio Olimpico; Attendance: 6,000; Referee: Luca Pairetto

21 December 2021 19	Genoa	0–0	Atalanta	Genoa
20:45 CET (UTC+1)	Sturaro (yellow card) 19'; Badelj (yellow card) 41'	Report	Freuler (yellow card) 23'	Stadium: Stadio Luigi Ferraris; Attendance: 6,000; Referee: Paolo Valeri

6 January 2022 20	Sassuolo	1–1	Genoa	Reggio Emilia
16:30 CET (UTC+1)	Raspadori (yellow card) 21'; Berardi 55'; Rogério (yellow card) 86'; Lopez (yellow card) 90+3'	Report	Destro 7'	Stadium: Mapei Stadium – Città del Tricolore; Attendance: 4,696; Referee: Gianluca Manganiello

9 January 2022 21	Genoa	0–1	Spezia	Genoa
18:30 CET (UTC+1)	Ekuban (yellow card) 5'; Destro (yellow card) 16'; Vásquez (yellow card) 54'	Report	Bastoni 14'; Manaj (yellow card) 55'; Maggiore (yellow card) 82'; Amian (yellow card) 90+4'	Stadium: Stadio Luigi Ferraris; Attendance: 8,000; Referee: Marco Guida

17 January 2022 22	Fiorentina	6–0	Genoa	Florence
20:45 CET (UTC+1)	Vlahović (penalty missed) 11', 51'; Odriozola 15'; Bonaventura 34'; Biraghi 42', 69'; Torreira (yellow card) 74', (goal) 77'	Report	Calafiori (yellow card) 32'; Portanova (yellow card) 36'; Sturaro (yellow card) 41'	Stadium: Stadio Artemio Franchi; Attendance: 5,000; Referee: Fabio Maresca

22 January 2022 23	Genoa	0–0	Udinese	Genoa
15:00 CET (UTC+1)	Sturaro (yellow card) 39'; Portanova (yellow card) 73'; Cambiaso (yellow card) 79' (yellow-red card) 79'	Report	Makengo (yellow card) 41'; Deulofeu (yellow card) 72'; Arslan (yellow card) 73'; Pérez (yellow card) 86'	Stadium: Stadio Luigi Ferraris; Attendance: 5,000; Referee: Daniele Doveri

5 February 2022 24	Roma	0–0	Genoa	Rome
15:00 CET (UTC+1)	Mancini (yellow card) 35'; Abraham (yellow card) 90+4'; Zaniolo (red card) 90+5'	Report	Vanheusden (yellow card) 25'; Østigård (red card) 69'; Vásquez (yellow card) 79'	Stadium: Stadio Olimpico; Attendance: 29,863; Referee: Rosario Abisso

13 February 2022 25	Genoa	1–1	Salernitana	Genoa
15:00 CET (UTC+1)	Destro 32'; Sturaro (yellow card) 53'; Badelj (yellow card) 61'; Rovella (yellow card) 66'	Report	Bonazzoli 45+1'; Mazzocchi (yellow card) 63'; Drăgușin (yellow card) 75'	Stadium: Stadio Luigi Ferraris; Attendance: 13,742; Referee: Marco Di Bello

20 February 2022 26	Venezia	1–1	Genoa	Venice
15:00 CET (UTC+1)	Henry 13'; Caldara (yellow card) 45+1'; Ampadu (yellow card) 89'	Report	Vásquez (yellow card) 23'; Ekuban 29'; Sturaro (yellow card) 48'	Stadium: Stadio Pier Luigi Penzo; Attendance: 7,566; Referee: Daniele Orsato

25 February 2022 27	Genoa	0–0	Internazionale	Genoa
21:00 CET (UTC+1)	Portanova (yellow card) 72'; Østigård (yellow card) 74'	Report	Perišić (yellow card) 54'	Stadium: Stadio Luigi Ferraris; Attendance: 14,314; Referee: Daniele Chiffi

6 March 2022 28	Genoa	0–0	Empoli	Genoa
12:30 CET (UTC+1)	Sturaro (yellow card) 41'; Yeboah (yellow card) 45+1'; Portanova (yellow card) 48'; Rovella (yellow card) 86'	Report	Verre (yellow card) 37'; Luperto (yellow card) 42'; Bandinelli (yellow card) 70'	Stadium: Stadio Luigi Ferraris; Attendance: 14,935; Referee: Gianluca Aureliano

13 March 2022 29	Atalanta	0–0	Genoa	Bergamo
18:00 CET (UTC+1)	Zappacosta (yellow card) 38'; Tolói (yellow card) 82'	Report		Stadium: Gewiss Stadium; Attendance: 9,140; Referee: Rosario Abisso

18 March 2022 30	Genoa	1–0	Torino	Genoa
21:00 CET (UTC+1)	Østigård (yellow card) 10' (yellow-red card) 24'; Portanova 14'; Bani (yellow card) 84'	Report	Izzo (yellow card) 88'; Pobega (yellow card) 90'; Ansaldi (yellow card) 90+2'	Stadium: Stadio Luigi Ferraris; Attendance: 14,961; Referee: Maurizio Mariani

4 April 2022 31	Hellas Verona	1–0	Genoa	Verona
18:30 CEST (UTC+2)	Simeone 5'; Ceccherini (yellow card) 36'; Tameze (yellow card) 38'; Bessa (yellow card) 65'; Casale (yellow card) 72'	Report	Sturaro (yellow card) 2'; Guðmundsson (yellow card) 45'; Hefti (yellow card) 76'	Stadium: Stadio Marcantonio Bentegodi; Attendance: 14,993; Referee: Francesco Fourneau

10 April 2022 32	Genoa	1–4	Lazio	Genoa
12:30 CEST (UTC+2)	Patric 68' (o.g.)	Report	Marušić 31'; Lucas (yellow card) 37'; Immobile 45+1', 63', 76'	Stadium: Stadio Luigi Ferraris; Attendance: 16,756; Referee: Gianluca Manganiello

15 April 2022 33	Milan	2–0	Genoa	Milan
21:00 CEST (UTC+2)	Leão 11'; Tonali (yellow card) 84'; Messias 87'	Report	Yeboah (yellow card) 79'; Guðmundsson (yellow card) 90+4'	Stadium: San Siro; Attendance: 70,259; Referee: Daniele Chiffi

24 April 2022 34	Genoa	1–0	Cagliari	Genoa
18:00 CEST (UTC+2)	Destro (yellow card) 49'; Sturaro (yellow card) 61'; Frendrup (yellow card) 84'; Badelj 89'	Report	João Pedro (yellow card) 41'; Grassi (yellow card) 71'	Stadium: Stadio Luigi Ferraris; Attendance: 17,257; Referee: Paolo Valeri

30 April 2022 35	Sampdoria	1–0	Genoa	Genoa
18:00 CEST (UTC+2)	Sabiri 25'; Audero (yellow card) 32'; Bereszyński (yellow card) 51'; Ferrari (yellow card) 90+5'	Report	Melegoni (yellow card) 90+1'; Criscito (penalty missed) 90+6'	Stadium: Stadio Luigi Ferraris; Attendance: 30,136; Referee: Fabio Maresca

6 May 2022 36	Genoa	2–1	Juventus	Genoa
21:00 CEST (UTC+2)	Melegoni (yellow card) 43'; Badelj (yellow card) 78'; Guðmundsson 87'; Criscito 90+6' (pen.)	Report	Dybala (yellow card) 29', (goal) 48'; Rugani (yellow card) 34'; Arthur (yellow card) 44'	Stadium: Stadio Luigi Ferraris; Attendance: 18,762; Referee: Simone Sozza

15 May 2022 37	Napoli	3–0	Genoa	Naples
15:00 CEST (UTC+2)	Osimhen 32'; Insigne 65' (pen.); Lobotka 81', (yellow card) 87'	Report	Galdames (yellow card) 38'	Stadium: Stadio Diego Armando Maradona; Attendance: 50,871; Referee: Michael Fabbri

21 May 2022 38	Genoa	0–1	Bologna	Genoa
17:15 CEST (UTC+2)	Galdames (yellow card) 38'; Criscito (yellow card) 54'; Østigård (yellow card) 58'	Report	Aebischer (yellow card) 25'; Barrow 66'	Stadium: Stadio Luigi Ferraris; Attendance: 17,768; Referee: Gianpiero Miele

=== Coppa Italia ===
13 August 2021 First round	Genoa	3–2	Perugia	Genoa
18:00 CEST (UTC+2)	Criscito 26' (pen.); Biraschi (yellow card) 38'; Chichizola 41' (o.g.); Pandev (yellow card) 56'; Kallon 88'	Report	Carretta 2'; Lisi 10'; Burrai (yellow card) 25'; Dell'Orco (yellow card) 30'; Curado (red card) 40'; Vanbaleghem (yellow card) 52'	Stadium: Stadio Luigi Ferraris; Attendance: 522; Referee: Antonio Rapuano

14 December 2021 Second round	Genoa	1–0	Salernitana	Genoa
21:00 CET (UTC+1)	Galdames (yellow card) 21'; Vásquez (yellow card) 32'; Ekuban 76'	Report	Schiavone (yellow card) 11'; Vergani (yellow card) 45+2'; Di Tacchio (yellow card) 57'	Stadium: Stadio Luigi Ferraris; Referee: Marco Serra

13 January 2022 Round of 16	Milan	3–1 (a.e.t.)	Genoa	Milan
21:00 CET (UTC+1)	Tonali (yellow card) 42'; Giroud 74'; Leão 102'; Saelemaekers 112', (yellow card) 115'	Report	Østigård 17', (yellow card) 53'; Badelj (yellow card) 37'; Yeboah (yellow card) 47'; Hefti (yellow card) 64'	Stadium: San Siro; Attendance: 13,325; Referee: Gianluca Aureliano

== Statistics ==
=== Appearances and goals ===
No.	Pos	Nat	Player	Total		Serie A		Coppa Italia	
No.	Pos	Nat	Player	Apps	Goals	Apps	Goals	Apps	Goals
Goalkeepers
1	GK	(Croatia) CRO	Adrian Šemper	0	0	0	0	0	0
22	GK	(Italy) ITA	Federico Marchetti	1	0	0	0	1	0
57	GK	(Italy) ITA	Salvatore Sirigu	12	0	12	0	0	0
Defenders
3	DF	(Belgium) BEL	Zinho Vanheusden	6	0	3+2	0	1	0
4	DF	(Italy) ITA	Domenico Criscito	13	6	12	5	1	1
5	DF	(Italy) ITA	Andrea Masiello	3	0	2+1	0	0	0
13	DF	(Italy) ITA	Mattia Bani	3	0	2+1	0	0	0
15	DF	(Mexico) MEX	Johan Vásquez	5	1	5	1	0	0
16	DF	(Italy) ITA	Riccardo Calafiori	0	0	0	0	0	0
17	DF	(Germany) GER	Lennart Czyborra	0	0	0	0	0	0
18	DF	(Italy) ITA	Paolo Ghiglione	6	0	2+4	0	0	0
36	DF	(Switzerland) SUI	Silvan Hefti	0	0	0	0	0	0
50	DF	(Italy) ITA	Andrea Cambiaso	13	1	11+1	1	1	0
52	DF	(Serbia) SRB	Nikola Maksimović	5	0	5	0	0	0
55	DF	(Norway) NOR	Leo Østigård	0	0	0	0	0	0
Midfielders
8	MF	(Germany) GER	Nadiem Amiri	0	0	0	0	0	0
10	MF	(Italy) ITA	Filippo Melegoni	4	0	2+2	0	0	0
11	MF	(Iceland) ISL	Albert Guðmundsson	0	0	0	0	0	0
27	MF	(Italy) ITA	Stefano Sturaro	8	0	6+1	0	1	0
33	MF	(Brazil) BRA	Hernani	5	0	3+1	0	1	0
47	MF	(Croatia) CRO	Milan Badelj	11	0	10	0	1	0
65	MF	(Italy) ITA	Nicolò Rovella	13	0	12	0	0+1	0
90	MF	(Italy) ITA	Manolo Portanova	1	0	0+1	0	0	0
99	MF	(Chile) CHI	Pablo Galdames	4	0	2+2	0	0	0
Forwards
9	FW	(Italy) ITA	Roberto Piccoli	0	0	0	0	0	0
20	FW	(Ghana) GHA	Caleb Ekuban	9	0	3+5	0	1	0
23	FW	(Italy) ITA	Mattia Destro	9	6	8	6	0+1	0
44	FW	(Poland) POL	Aleksander Buksa	2	0	0+2	0	0	0
45	FW	(Italy) ITA	Kelvin Yeboah	0	0	0	0	0	0
91	FW	(Sierra Leone) SLE	Yayah Kallon	13	1	5+7	0	0+1	1
Players transferred out during the season
2	DF	(Italy) ITA	Stefano Sabelli	5	0	3+1	0	1	0
8	MF	(Italy) ITA	Francesco Cassata	0	0	0	0	0	0
9	FW	(Ecuador) ECU	Felipe Caicedo	5	1	1+4	1	0	0
11	MF	(Switzerland) SUI	Valon Behrami	9	0	1+8	0	0	0
14	DF	(Italy) ITA	Davide Biraschi	10	0	7+2	0	1	0
19	FW	(North Macedonia) MKD	Goran Pandev	12	0	4+7	0	0+1	0
21	MF	(Serbia) SRB	Ivan Radovanović	0	0	0	0	0	0
24	FW	(Italy) ITA	Flavio Bianchi	4	1	1+2	1	1	0
66	DF	(Italy) ITA	Laurens Serpe	2	0	0+1	0	0+1	0
93	MF	(Algeria) ALG	Mohamed Farès	7	2	5+2	2	0	0
94	MF	(France) FRA	Abdoulaye Touré	6	0	5+1	0	0	0

Last updated: 5 November 2021
Source: Competitions
