= Vodišek =

Vodišek is a Slovene surname. Notable people with the surname include:

- Rok Vodišek (born 1998), Slovene footballer
- Toni Vodišek (born 2000), Slovene kitesurfer
