= Milan Badelj =

Croatian footballer (born 1989)

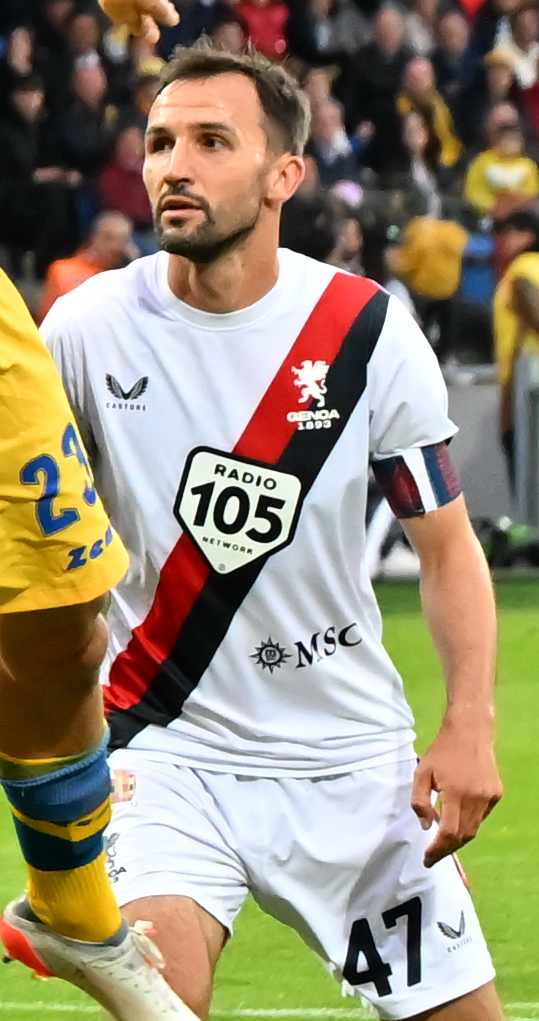
- Badelj with Genoa in 2023

Personal information
- Full name: Milan Badelj
- Date of birth: 25 February 1989 (age 37)
- Place of birth: Zagreb, SR Croatia, Yugoslavia
- Height: 1.86 m (6 ft 1 in)
- Position: Defensive midfielder

Youth career
- 1995–2002: Ponikve
- 2002–2005: NK Zagreb
- 2005–2007: Dinamo Zagreb

Senior career*
Years	Team	Apps	(Gls)
2007–2012	Dinamo Zagreb	113	(25)
2007–2008	→ Lokomotiva (loan)	28	(7)
2012–2014	Hamburger SV	62	(2)
2014–2018	Fiorentina	108	(6)
2018–2020	Lazio	23	(1)
2019–2020	→ Fiorentina (loan)	22	(1)
2020–2025	Genoa	146	(7)
Total		502	(49)

International career
2004	Croatia U16	1	(0)
2004–2005	Croatia U17	28	(2)
2005–2006	Croatia U18	5	(0)
2006–2008	Croatia U19	13	(0)
2009	Croatia U20	2	(0)
2008–2010	Croatia U21	14	(0)
2010–2021	Croatia	55	(2)
Medal record
Men's football
Representing Croatia
FIFA World Cup
Runner-up	2018 Russia
- * Club domestic league appearances and goals

Milan Badelj (Croatian pronunciation: [mǐlan bǎdeʎ]; born 25 February 1989) is a Croatian former professional footballer who played as a defensive midfielder. He was a member of the Croatian squad that finished runners-up in the 2018 FIFA World Cup as well as part of the country's squad at its 2014 edition and the UEFA Euro's editions in 2012, 2016 and 2020.

== Club career ==
=== Early career ===
Milan Badelj signed for Dinamo Zagreb as a 17-year-old in 2007, just after he was snapped up from the youth system of Dinamo Zagreb's city rival, NK Zagreb. For the 2007–08 season, he was sent on loan to Dinamo Zagreb's affiliate Lokomotiva to gain first–team experience at the senior level. He played in 28 matches and scored seven goals for Lokomotiva in the Croatian Third League.

=== Dinamo Zagreb ===
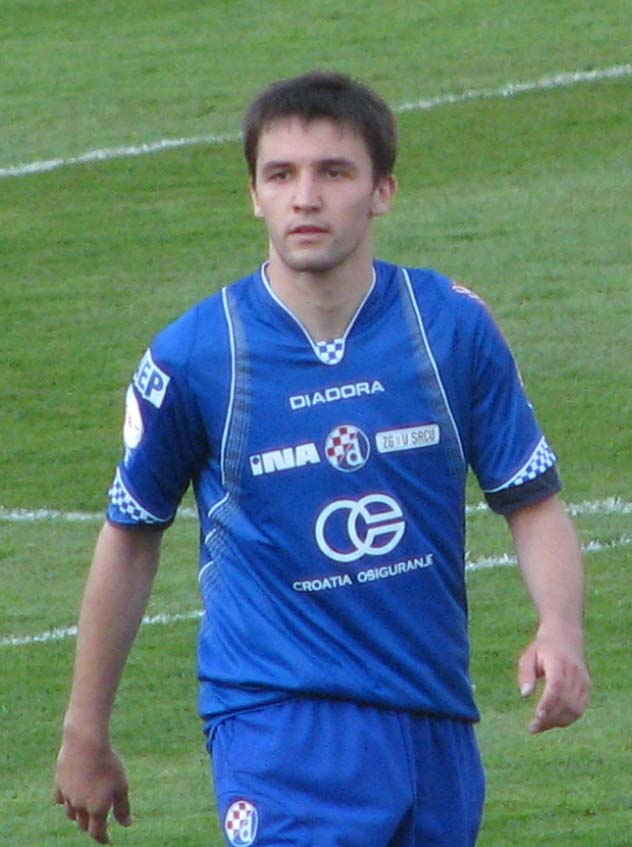
Badelj playing for Dinamo Zagreb in April 2009

At an early age, Badelj was already spotted as a possible replacement for Luka Modrić, a key figure in the Dinamo Zagreb first-team squad that joined Tottenham Hotspur in 2008.

In 2008, Badelj joined the first team and immediately established himself as an important player. He made his senior debut for Dinamo in Champions League qualifier against Northern Irish club Linfield. He then made his domestic debut in the opening match of the 2008–09 season against Rijeka, scoring the first goal in 2–0 victory. He finished his first season with Dinamo with 31 domestic appearances and 12 UEFA Cup appearances.

Badelj continued to impress at his young age, establishing himself as a first–team regular for the 2009–10 season. In March 2011, he scored a goal in a 2–0 victory in the derby match against great rivals Hajduk Split. Badelj continued with impressive performances in the 2010–11 season as well, even wearing the captain's armband in some matches.

In the 2011–12 season, Badelj was one of the key players in the Dinamo squad that reached the 2011–12 UEFA Champions League group stage for the first time in 12 years. He appeared in all six of Dinamo's group stage games against Real Madrid, Lyon and Ajax.

In what would be his final game at the Stadion Maksimir for Dinamo, in a Champions League playoff match against Slovenian side Maribor, Badelj scored an own goal that gave the opposition an equaliser in the first leg match. However, Badelj later scored the winning goal at the other end in the second half.

=== Hamburger SV ===
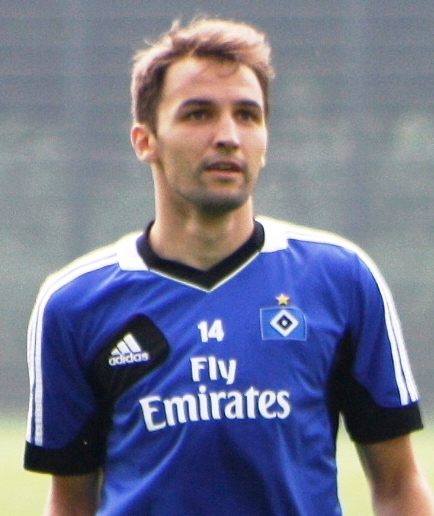
Badelj with Hamburger SV in 2013

Badelj joined Hamburger SV of the Bundesliga in August 2012 for an undisclosed fee thought to be in the region of €4.5 million, according to the Croatian media. He made his domestic debut soon after joining the club in a match against Werder Bremen. He soon established himself as a first-team regular, typically operating as a deep-lying playmaker. Badelj scored his first Bundesliga goal against Schalke 04, in a 3–1 win, on 27 November 2012.

=== Fiorentina ===
On 31 August 2014, it was announced Badelj had signed for Serie A side Fiorentina for a fee believed to be in the region of €5 million. In 2018, after the sudden death of Davide Astori due to cardiac arrest in early March 2018, Badelj was appointed as team captain.

=== Lazio ===
Badelj joined Lazio on 1 August 2018, on a free transfer. On 17 February 2019, he scored his first goal for the club in a 2–1 loss to Genoa.

==== Loan to Fiorentina ====
On 5 August 2019, Badelj joined Fiorentina on loan until 30 June 2020 with an option to buy. On 3 September 2019 he wore captain armband in 1–1 draw against Parma, despite being a loaned player, due to absence of regular captain Germán Pezzella. It was the first time for Badelj to being captain since his comeback. Fiorentina chose not to activate the option and Badelj returned to Lazio at the end of the spell.

=== Genoa ===
On 16 September 2020, Badelj signed a three-year contract with Genoa.

On 20 February 2021, he scored his first goal for the club, as he equalized at the last minute of a match against Hellas Verona: in that occasion, he celebrated by displaying the number 13 with his fingers pointed to the sky, as a way to pay tribute to his late friend and former teammate Davide Astori (who had wore the number 13 throughout most of his career until his death in 2018).

=== Retirement from playing ===
On 21 August 2025, Dinamo Zagreb announced that Badelj agreed to return to the club for a position at the club's academy.

== International career ==
During his youth career for the national team, Badelj earned a total of 63 caps, for all youth teams from U16 to U21.

In 2010, Badelj was selected for the Croatia national team squad for the first time, but was mostly on the bench. His competitive debut came during a UEFA Euro 2012 qualifying match against Malta; a match Croatia won 3–1, on 2 September 2011, in which Badelj scored the second goal. He was selected for the UEFA Euro 2012 squad; and in May 2014, was selected for the final squad at the 2014 FIFA World Cup in Brazil following an injury to Ivan Močinić. However, he was an unused substitute for most of the tournament, as Croatia were knocked out in the group stage. He was selected for UEFA Euro 2016.

In May 2018, Badelj was selected for the final 23-man squad for the 2018 FIFA World Cup in Russia. He scored his first goal of the tournament in a 2–1 win over Iceland; helping Croatia en route to topping the group on maximum points. On 1 July, in Croatia's round of sixteen tie with Denmark, the game was drawn 1–1 and was decided through a penalty shootout in which Badelj missed Croatia's first penalty, though they would scored three while their opponents only scored two.

== Career statistics ==
=== Club ===
As of match played 24 May 2025

Appearances and goals by club, season and competition
Club	Season	League			National cup		Europe		Other		Total	
Club	Season	Division	Apps	Goals	Apps	Goals	Apps	Goals	Apps	Goals	Apps	Goals
Lokomotiva	2007–08	Treća HNL	28	7	—		—		—		28	7
Dinamo Zagreb	2008–09	Prva HNL	31	4	7	1	12 (Note: Six appearances in UEFA Champions League, six appearances and one goal in UEFA Cup)	1	—		50	6
Dinamo Zagreb	2009–10	Prva HNL	27	11	2	1	11 (Note: Four appearances and one goal in UEFA Champions League, seven appearances and one goal in UEFA Europa League)	2	—		40	14
Dinamo Zagreb	2010–11	Prva HNL	29	6	8	3	11 (Note: Three appearances in UEFA Champions League, eight in UEFA Europa League)	0	1 (Note: Appearance in Croatian Football Super Cup)	0	49	9
Dinamo Zagreb	2011–12	Prva HNL	24	3	6	2	12 (Note: Appearances in UEFA Champions League)	1	—		42	6
Dinamo Zagreb	2012–13	Prva HNL	2	1	—		6	1	—		8	2
Dinamo Zagreb	Total		113	25	23	7	52	5	1	0	189	37
Hamburger SV	2012–13	Bundesliga	31	1	—		—		—		31	1
Hamburger SV	2013–14	Bundesliga	29	1	4	0	—		2 (Note: Appearances in Bundesliga promotion/relegation play-offs)	0	35	1
Hamburger SV	2014–15	Bundesliga	2	0	1	0	—		—		3	0
Hamburger SV	Total		62	2	5	0	—		2	0	69	2
Fiorentina	2014–15	Serie A	21	1	3	0	13 (Note: Appearances in UEFA Europa League)	0	—		37	1
Fiorentina	2015–16	Serie A	27	1	1	0	7	0	—		35	1
Fiorentina	2016–17	Serie A	33	2	2	0	6	0	—		41	2
Fiorentina	2017–18	Serie A	27	2	0	0	—		—		27	2
Fiorentina	Total		108	6	6	0	26	0	—		140	6
Lazio	2018–19	Serie A	23	1	1	0	2	0	—		26	1
Fiorentina (loan)	2019–20	Serie A	22	1	2	0	—		—		24	1
Genoa	2020–21	Serie A	30	1	1	0	—		—		31	1
Genoa	2021–22	Serie A	34	1	2	0	—		—		36	1
Genoa	2022–23	Serie B	26	3	3	0	—		—		29	3
Genoa	2023–24	Serie A	32	1	2	0	—		—		34	1
Genoa	2024–25	Serie A	24	1	2	0	—		—		26	1
Genoa	Total		146	7	10	0	—		—		156	7
Career total			498	49	46	7	80	5	3	0	627	61

=== International ===
As of 1 June 2021

Croatia
Year	Apps	Goals
2010	2	0
2011	1	1
2012	4	0
2013	2	0
2014	2	0
2015	6	0
2016	12	0
2017	6	0
2018	9	1
2019	6	0
2020	3	0
2021	2	0
Total	55	2

Scores and results list Croatia's goal tally first

#	Date	Venue	Opponent	Score	Result	Competition
1	2 September 2011	Ta' Qali National Stadium, Attard, Malta	Malta	2–0	3–1	UEFA Euro 2012 qualifying
2	26 June 2018	Rostov Arena, Rostov-on-Don, Russia	Iceland	1–0	2–1	2018 FIFA World Cup

== Honours ==
Dinamo Zagreb

- Prva HNL: 2008–09, 2009–10, 2010–11, 2011–12
- Croatian Cup: 2008–09, 2010–11, 2011–12
- Croatian Super Cup: 2010

Lazio

- Coppa Italia: 2018–19

Croatia

- FIFA World Cup runner-up: 2018

Individual

- Croatian Football Hope of the Year: 2009

Orders

- Order of Duke Branimir : 2018
