= Josep Martínez =

Spanish footballer (born 1998)

- Martínez training with Spain in 2026

Personal information
- Full name: Josep Martínez Riera
- Date of birth: 27 May 1998 (age 28)
- Place of birth: Alzira, Spain
- Height: 1.91 m (6 ft 3 in)
- Position: Goalkeeper

Team information
- Current team: Inter Milan
- Number: 1

Youth career
- 2003–2015: Alzira
- 2015–2017: Barcelona

Senior career*
Years	Team	Apps	(Gls)
2017–2019	Las Palmas B	55	(0)
2019–2020	Las Palmas	28	(0)
2020–2023	RB Leipzig	2	(0)
2022–2023	→ Genoa (loan)	30	(0)
2023–2024	Genoa	36	(0)
2024–	Inter Milan	20	(0)

International career
2019–2020	Spain U21	3	(0)
2021	Spain	1	(0)
- * Club domestic league appearances and goals as of 22 November 2026 (UTC)

Josep Martínez Riera (born 27 May 1998) is a Spanish professional footballer who plays as a goalkeeper for Serie A club Inter Milan and the Spain national team.

== Club career ==
=== Las Palmas ===
Born in Alzira, Valencia, Martínez joined Barcelona's La Masia in July 2015, from his hometown's Alzira. On 19 July 2017, after finishing his formation, he signed for Las Palmas and was assigned to the reserves in Segunda División B.

Martínez made his senior debut on 20 August 2017, starting in a 1–1 home draw against Melilla. He finished the campaign as a starter, as his side avoided relegation.

Martínez made his first team debut on 28 April 2019, playing the full 90 minutes of a 4–1 home routing of Lugo in the Segunda División championship. On 17 June, he was definitely promoted to the main squad.

=== RB Leipzig ===
On 22 January 2020, RB Leipzig reached an agreement with Las Palmas for the transfer of Martínez, effective as of 1 July. He agreed to a contract until 2024 with his new club.

=== Genoa ===
On 29 June 2022, Martínez was loaned to Genoa in Italy for the Serie B 2022–23 season.

On 9 June 2023, since the inclusion of a "sell-out" right following the promotion to Serie A, Martínez was bought by Genoa.

=== Inter Milan ===
On 9 July 2024, Martínez signed for fellow Serie A side Inter Milan on a permanent basis. He made his debut on 19 December 2024 in the round of 16 of the Coppa Italia, keeping a clean sheet in a 2–0 victory against Udinese. After first-choice goalkeeper Yann Sommer sustained a fractured thumb in training, Martínez made his Serie A debut for the club on 22 February 2025, securing a 1–0 victory against his former team, Genoa.

Following Sommer's departure from the San Siro in 2026, Martínez became first choice and inherited the number 1 jersey.

== International career ==
Due to the isolation of some national team players following the positive COVID-19 test of Sergio Busquets, Spain's under-21 squad were called up for the international friendly against Lithuania on 8 June 2021. Martínez made his senior debut in the match.

== Career statistics ==
=== Club ===
As of match played 22 November 2026

Appearances and goals by club, season and competition
Club	Season	League			National cup (Note: Includes Copa del Rey, DFB-Pokal, Coppa Italia)		Europe		Other		Total	
Club	Season	Division	Apps	Goals	Apps	Goals	Apps	Goals	Apps	Goals	Apps	Goals
Las Palmas B	2017–18	Segunda División B	25	0	—		—		—		25	0
Las Palmas B	2018–19	Segunda División B	30	0	—		—		—		30	0
Las Palmas B	Total		55	0	—		—		—		55	0
Las Palmas	2018–19	Segunda División	7	0	0	0	—		—		7	0
Las Palmas	2019–20	Segunda División	21	0	2	0	—		—		23	0
Las Palmas	Total		28	0	2	0	—		—		30	0
RB Leipzig	2020–21	Bundesliga	1	0	0	0	0	0	—		1	0
RB Leipzig	2021–22	Bundesliga	1	0	1	0	1 (Note: Appearance(s) in UEFA Champions League)	0	—		3	0
RB Leipzig	Total		2	0	1	0	1	0	—		4	0
Genoa (loan)	2022–23	Serie B	30	0	2	0	—		—		32	0
Genoa	2023–24	Serie A	36	0	0	0	—		—		36	0
Genoa	Genoa total		66	0	2	0	—		—		68	0
Inter Milan	2024–25	Serie A	5	0	4	0	1	0	0	0	10	0
Inter Milan	2025–26	Serie A	5	0	5	0	0	0	1 (Note: Appearance in Supercoppa Italiana)	0	11	0
Inter Milan	2026–27	Serie A	10	0	0	0	4	0	0	0	14	0
Inter Milan	Total		20	0	9	0	5	0	1	0	35	0
Career total			171	0	14	0	6	0	1	0	192	0

=== International ===
Appearances and goals by national team and year
National team	Year	Apps	Goals
Spain	2021	1	0
Total		1	0

== Honours ==
RB Leipzig

- DFB-Pokal: 2021–22

Inter Milan

- Serie A: 2025–26
- Coppa Italia: 2025–26
