= Pablo Galdames (footballer, born 1996) =

Chilean footballer

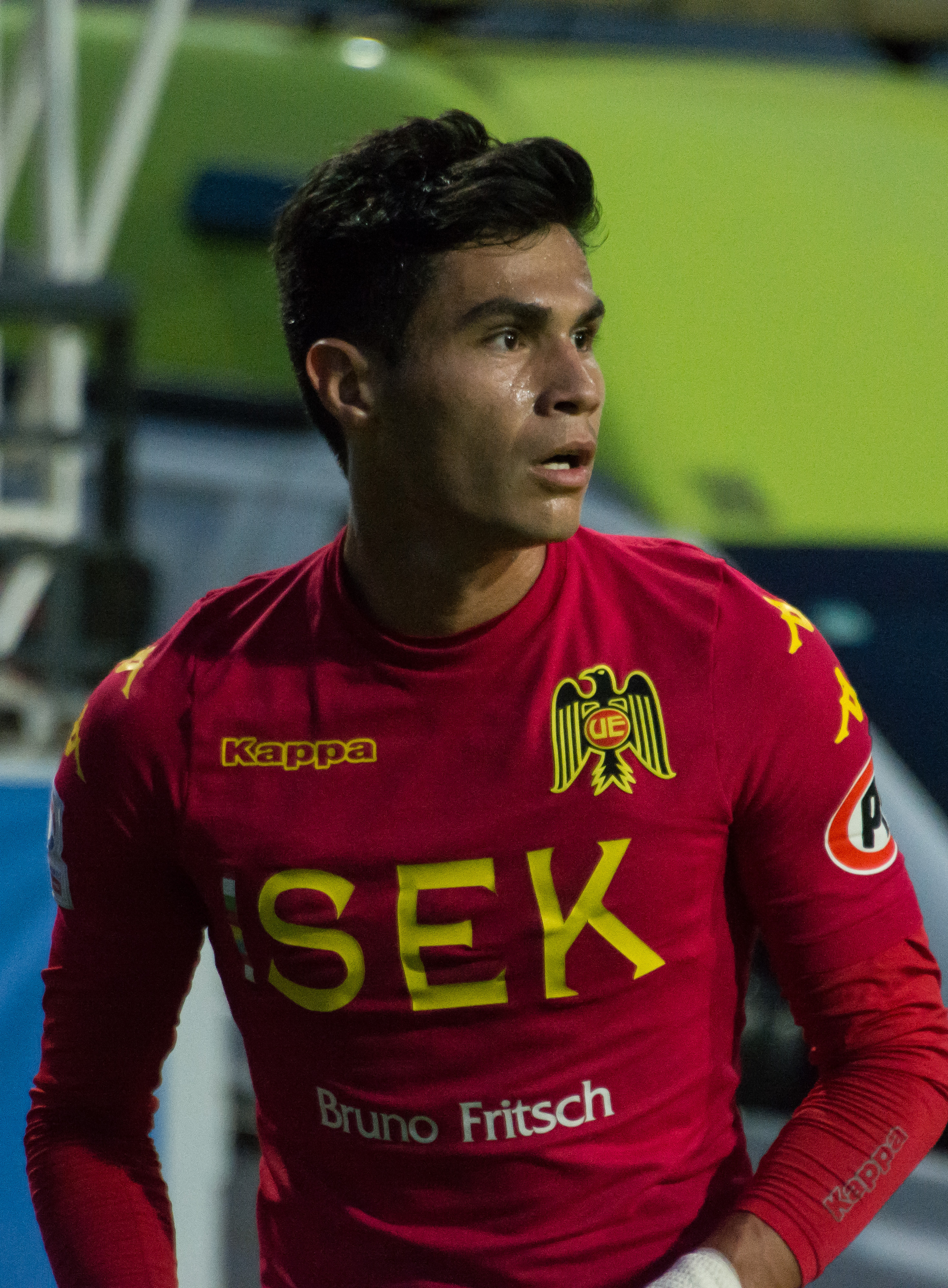
- Galdames with Unión Española in 2018

Personal information
- Full name: Pablo Ignacio Galdames Millán
- Date of birth: 30 December 1996 (age 29)
- Place of birth: Santiago, Chile
- Height: 1.76 m (5 ft 9 in)
- Position: Defensive midfielder

Team information
- Current team: Burgos
- Number: 4

Youth career
- Universidad de Chile
- 2009–2014: Unión Española

Senior career*
Years	Team	Apps	(Gls)
2013–2014	Unión Española B	3	(0)
2013–2018	Unión Española	97	(4)
2018–2021	Vélez Sarsfield	45	(1)
2021–2024	Genoa	25	(0)
2023	→ Cremonese (loan)	13	(1)
2024	Vasco da Gama	25	(1)
2025	Independiente	24	(1)
2026–	Burgos	14	(0)

International career^{‡}
2014–2015	Chile U20	1	(0)
2017–	Chile	12	(0)
- * Club domestic league appearances and goals as of 6 June 2026 ‡ National team caps and goals as of , 14 June 2022 (UTC)

Pablo Ignacio Galdames Millán (Spanish pronunciation: [ˈpaβlo ɣalˈdames miˈʝan]; (Note: In isolation, Galdames is pronounced [ɡalˈdames].) born 30 December 1996) is a Chilean professional footballer who plays as a defensive midfielder for Spanish club Burgos CF.

== Club career ==
On 31 August 2021, the last day of the 2021 summer transfer window, Galdames joined Serie A club Genoa on a deal until 2024. On 31 January 2023, he was loaned to Cremonese.

On 5 February 2024, Galdames moved to Brazil and joined Vasco da Gama until December. In 2025, he returned to Argentina after his stint with Vélez Sarsfield and signed with Independiente on a two-year contract.

On 23 January 2026, Galdames was announced at Spanish Segunda División club Burgos CF on an 18-month contract.

== International career ==
Galdames represented Chile U20 at the Torneo Cuatro Naciones Chile 2014,

== Personal life ==
He is the son of the Chilean former international footballer of the same name Pablo Galdames, brother of Thomas and Benjamín and half-brother of Mathías. In addition, through his maternal line, he and his brothers are related to the Spanish-Chilean footballer Nerea Sánchez Millán.

== Style of play ==
Galdames is a deep-lying playmaker, known for his ability to pass the pass progressively over long distances.

== Career statistics ==
=== Club ===
As of match played 23 August 2024

Appearances and goals by club, season and competition
Club	Season	League			National Cup (Note: Includes Copa Argentina, Copa de la Superliga, Coppa Italia)		Continental		Other		Total	
Club	Season	Division	Apps	Goals	Apps	Goals	Apps	Goals	Apps	Goals	Apps	Goals
Unión Española	2014–15	Primera División	14	1	0	0	—		—		14	1
Unión Española	2015–16	Primera División	26	1	0	0	—		—		26	1
Unión Española	2016–17	Primera División	20	1	0	0	4 (Note: Appearance(s) in Copa Libertadores)	0	1	0	25	1
Unión Española	2017	Primera División	11	0	0	0	—		2	0	13	0
Unión Española	2018	Primera División	15	0	0	0	2 (Note: Appearance(s) in Copa Sudamericana)	0	—		17	0
Unión Española	Total		86	3	0	0	6	0	3	0	95	3
Vélez Sarsfield	2018–19	Primera División	11	1	4	0	—		—		15	1
Vélez Sarsfield	2019–20	Primera División	14	0	12	1	6	0	—		32	1
Vélez Sarsfield	2021	Primera División	0	0	11	0	5	1	—		16	1
Vélez Sarsfield	Total		25	1	27	1	11	1	—		63	3
Genoa	2021–22	Serie A	19	0	1	0	—		—		20	0
Genoa	2022–23	Serie B	4	0	2	0	—		—		6	0
Genoa	2023–24	Serie A	2	0	2	0	—		—		4	0
Genoa	Total		25	0	5	0	—		—		30	0
Cremonese (loan)	2022–23	Serie A	13	1	2	0	—		—		15	1
Career total			149	5	34	1	17	1	3	0	203	7

== Honours ==
Chile

- China Cup: 2017

União Espanhola

- Torneio Transição: 2013
- Supercopa de Chile: 2013

Vélez Sarsfield

- Torneio Complementar da Copa Diego Maradona: 2021
