= Adrian Šemper =

Croatian footballer

Personal information
- Date of birth: 12 January 1998 (age 28)
- Place of birth: Zagreb, Croatia
- Height: 1.92 m (6 ft 4 in)
- Position: Goalkeeper

Team information
- Current team: Al Fateh
- Number: 1

Youth career
- 2004–2016: Dinamo Zagreb

Senior career*
Years	Team	Apps	(Gls)
2016–2020	Dinamo Zagreb	8	(0)
2017–2018	→ Lokomotiva (loan)	37	(0)
2018–2020	→ Chievo (loan)	44	(0)
2020–2021	Chievo	36	(0)
2021–2023	Genoa	9	(0)
2023–2024	Como	38	(0)
2024–2026	Pisa	61	(0)
2026–	Al Fateh	1	(0)

International career
2013	Croatia U15	3	(0)
2014	Croatia U16	4	(0)
2014–2015	Croatia U17	17	(0)
2015	Croatia U18	6	(0)
2016	Croatia U19	3	(0)
2017–2021	Croatia U21	12	(0)
- * Club domestic league appearances and goals as of 25 May 2026

Adrian Šemper (born 12 January 1998) is a Croatian footballer who plays as goalkeeper for Saudi Pro League club Al Fateh.

== Club career ==
=== Early career ===
Born in Zagreb, Croatia, Adrian Šemper started his football career with GNK Dinamo Zagreb youth academy in 2004. He was considered one of the best talents in a generation of Dinamo Zagreb players born in 1998, including Josip Brekalo, Nikola Moro, Borna Sosa, Branimir Kalaica and Vinko Soldo.

=== Dinamo Zagreb ===
In 2016, Šemper signed his first professional contract with Dinamo Zagreb. He made his league debut on 6 May 2016 against NK Slaven Belupo at Gradski stadion which Dinamo Zagreb won 3–0. In this match, he played 90 minutes whole the game and he lost on goals. On 16 January 2016, Chelsea made an offer of Šemper to Dinamo Zagreb for £3.1 million, but Dinamo Zagreb rejected the offer and Šemper remained in Dinamo. In the 2015–16 season Šemper made his professional debut and Dinamo Zagreb achieved the double of league and cup.

=== Chievo ===
On 9 August 2018, Šemper joined Serie A club Chievo Verona on loan with an option to buy. He made his league debut on 20 April 2019 in a 2–1 away win against Lazio.

On 11 June 2020, Chievo bought out his rights and he signed a four-year contract with the club.

=== Genoa ===
On 11 August 2021, Šemper signed with Serie A club Genoa.

=== Como ===
On 12 July 2023, Šemper signed a four years deal with Serie B club Como.

=== Pisa ===
On 30 July 2024, Šemper moved to Pisa.

== International career ==
Šemper has represented his country at various age groups, most recently for the Croatia national under-19 football team. In 2015, he played 2015 UEFA European Under-17 Championship and 2015 FIFA U-17 World Cup. Since March 2016, he has been member of Croatia national under-19 football team.

== Career statistics ==
=== Club ===
As of match played 23 May 2026

Appearances and goals by club, season and competition
Club	Season	League	League		Cup		Europe		Other		Total	
Club	Season	League	Apps	Goals	Apps	Goals	Apps	Goals	Apps	Goals	Apps	Goals
Dinamo Zagreb	2015–16	1. HNL	1	0	—		—		—		1	0
Dinamo Zagreb	2016–17	1. HNL	6	0	2	0	2	0	—		10	0
Dinamo Zagreb	2018–19	1. HNL	1	0	0	0	0	0	—		1	0
Dinamo Zagreb	Total		8	0	2	0	2	0	—		12	0
Lokomotiva (loan)	2016–17	1. HNL	16	0	0	0	—		—		16	0
Lokomotiva (loan)	2017–18	1. HNL	21	0	4	0	—		—		25	0
Lokomotiva (loan)	Total		37	0	4	0	—		—		41	0
Chievo (loan)	2018–19	Serie A	6	0	1	0	—		—		7	0
Chievo (loan)	2019–20	Serie B	38	0	2	0	—		—		40	0
Chievo	2020–21	Serie B	36	0	0	0	—		—		36	0
Chievo	Chievo total		80	0	3	0	—		—		83	0
Genoa	2021–22	Serie A	1	0	2	0	—		—		3	0
Genoa	2022–23	Serie B	8	0	1	0	—		—		9	0
Genoa	Total		9	0	3	0	—		—		12	0
Como	2023–24	Serie B	38	0	1	0	—		—		39	0
Pisa	2024–25	Serie B	36	0	1	0	—		—		37	0
Pisa	2025–26	Serie A	25	0	1	0	—		—		26	0
Pisa	Total		61	0	2	0	—		—		63	0
Career total			233	0	15	0	2	0	0	0	250	0

== Honours ==
=== Club ===
==== Dinamo Zagreb ====
- Croatian First Football League (1): 2015–16
