= Brayan Boci =

Italian footballer (born 2003)

Personal information
- Date of birth: 24 July 2003 (age 23)
- Place of birth: San Giovanni Valdarno, Italy
- Height: 1.83 m (6 ft 0 in)
- Positions: Left-back; centre-back

Team information
- Current team: Union Brescia
- Number: 24

Youth career
- –2022: Genoa

Senior career*
Years	Team	Apps	(Gls)
2022–2024	Genoa	2	(0)
2023–2024	→ Lecco (loan)	0	(0)
2024	→ Legnago Salus (loan)	14	(1)
2024–2025	Feralpisalò	26	(1)
2025–	Union Brescia	25	(1)

International career^{‡}
2021–2022	Italy U19	1	(0)
2023	Albania U21	1	(0)
- * Club domestic league appearances and goals as of 29 April 2026 ‡ National team caps and goals as of 23:00, 13 October 2023 (UTC)

Brayan Boci (born 24 July 2003) is a professional footballer who plays as a defender for Serie C Group A club Union Brescia. Born in Italy, he represents Albania internationally.

== Club career ==
Born in San Giovanni Valdarno from Albanian parents, Boci played football in Genoa's youth sector, where he captained several sides and won a national under-18 title in 2021.

During the 2022–23 season, Boci started training regularly with the first team, following the temporary promotion of head coach Alberto Gilardino from the under-19 squad. On 26 December 2022, he made his professional debut, coming in as a substitute for Stefano Sabelli at the 76th minute of the league match against Bari, which ended in 2–1 win for his side. On 19 February 2023, Boci made his first professional start in a league match against Modena: however, he got injured during the first half of the game, being subsequently replaced with Domenico Criscito. At the end of the campaign, Boci was involved in a double promotion, as Genoa's first team returned to Serie A after just one year, while the Primavera squad gained automatic promotion back to the Campionato Primavera 1.

On 17 July 2023, Boci joined Serie B club Lecco on a season-long loan. Having not made a single appearance for the side in the first half of the campaign, he joined Serie C club Legnago Salus on loan until the end of the season on 5 January 2024.

On 17 July 2024, Boci signed a three-year contract with Feralpisalò.

== International career ==
Thanks to his origins, Boci can represent both Italy and Albania internationally.

After taking part to a training camp with the Italian under-16 national team in 2019, he went on to feature for the under-19 team two years later.

After switching allegiances to Albania, he received his first call-up to the Albanian under-21 national team in October 2023.

== Style of play ==
Boci is predominantly a left-back, who can also play a centre-back or a left wing-back in a five-men midfield.

A left-footed player, he can support the attacking phase while covering defensively, thanks to his tackling and marking abilities.

== Career statistics ==
As of match played 19 February 2023

Appearances and goals by club, season and competition
Club	Season	League			Coppa Italia		Total	
Club	Season	Division	Apps	Goals	Apps	Goals	Apps	Goals
Genoa	2022–23	Serie B	2	0	0	0	2	0
Career total			2	0	0	0	2	0
