= Shady Oukhadda =

Italian-Moroccan association football player (born 1999)

Personal information
- Date of birth: 17 January 1999 (age 27)
- Place of birth: Abano Terme, Italy
- Height: 1.87 m (6 ft 2 in)
- Position: Midfielder

Team information
- Current team: Casertana
- Number: 18

Youth career
- –2014: Padova
- 2014–2018: Torino

Senior career*
| Years | Team | Apps | (Gls) |
| 2018–2020 | Torino | 0 | (0) |
| 2018–2019 | → Albissola (loan) | 32 | (0) |
| 2019–2020 | → Siena (loan) | 20 | (1) |
| 2020–2022 | Gubbio | 53 | (3) |
| 2022–2025 | Modena | 64 | (0) |
| 2024–2025 | → Benevento (loan) | 26 | (1) |
| 2025– | Casertana | 35 | (1) |

International career
| 2016 | Morocco U17 | 3 | (0) |
| 2017 | Morocco U20 | 6 | (0) |
- * Club domestic league appearances and goals as of 1 May 2026

Shady Oukhadda (born 17 January 1999) is a professional footballer who plays as a midfielder for Serie C Group C club Casertana. Born in Italy, he has represented Morocco at youth international level.

== Club career ==
He made his Serie C debut for Albissola on 19 September 2018 in a game against Olbia.

On 18 July 2019, he joined Siena on loan.

On 3 October 2020, he moved to Gubbio on a permanent basis.

On 25 January 2022, he signed a contract with Modena until 30 June 2025. On 30 August 2024, Oukhadda was loaned to Benevento, with an option to buy.
