= Laurens Serpe =

Italian footballer

Personal information
- Date of birth: 7 February 2001 (age 25)
- Place of birth: Fivizzano, Italy
- Height: 1.93 m (6 ft 4 in)
- Position: Centre back

Team information
- Current team: Imperia
- Number: 39

Youth career
- –2021: Genoa
- 2018–2019: → Inter Milan (loan)

Senior career*
Years	Team	Apps	(Gls)
2021–2022	Genoa	1	(0)
2022	→ Crotone (loan)	0	(0)
2022–2026	Spezia	1	(0)
2022–2023	→ Imolese (loan)	24	(0)
2024	→ Turris (loan)	1	(0)
2024–2025	→ Pro Vercelli (loan)	7	(0)
2026	Forte Virtus		
2026–	Imperia	0	(0)

International career
2017	Italy U17	9	(0)
2018	Italy U18	1	(0)
2020	Italy U19	1	(0)
2021	Italy U20	1	(0)
- * Club domestic league appearances and goals as of 14 March 2026

Laurens Serpe (born 7 February 2001) is an Italian professional footballer who plays as a centre back for Italian Serie D club Imperia.

== Club career ==
Serpe made his debut for the senior squad of Genoa on 13 August 2021 as an added-time substitute in a Coppa Italia game against Perugia. He made his Serie A debut for Genoa on 21 August 2021 in a game against Inter Milan. He substituted Davide Biraschi at half-time of a 0–4 away loss.

On 17 January 2022, Serpe moved to Crotone in Serie B on loan.

On 8 July 2022, Serpe signed a four-year contract with Spezia.

On 16 August 2022, Spezia loaned Serpe to Imolese.

On 20 January 2024, he moved on loan to Turris.

On 12 July 2024, Serpe was loaned to Pro Vercelli, with an option to buy.

On 16 February 2026, Serpe moved definitely to Forte Virtus FC in UAE Second Division League.

== International career ==
He was first called up to represent Italy in 2017 for under-17 friendlies.

== Personal life ==
Born in Italy, he has two brothers (Ruben and Philip), his mother is from the Netherlands while his father is Italian.
