= Leo Østigård =

Norwegian footballer (born 1999)

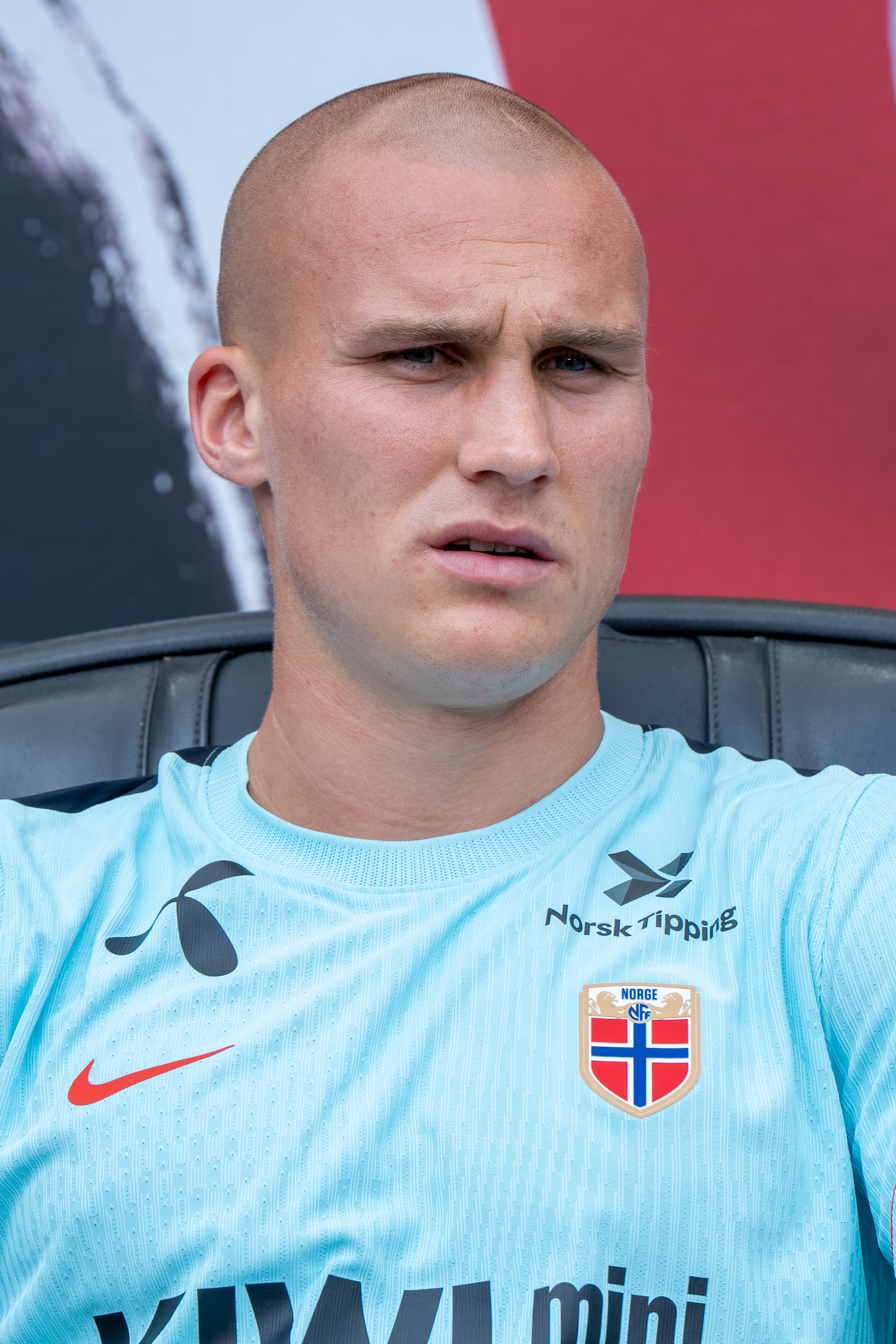
- Østigård with Norway in 2026

Personal information
- Full name: Leo Skiri Østigård
- Date of birth: 28 November 1999 (age 26)
- Place of birth: Molde, Norway
- Height: 1.82 m (6 ft 0 in)
- Position: Centre-back

Team information
- Current team: Genoa
- Number: 5

Senior career*
Years	Team	Apps	(Gls)
2017–2018	Molde	1	(0)
2018	→ Viking (loan)	11	(0)
2018–2022	Brighton & Hove Albion	0	(0)
2019–2020	→ FC St. Pauli (loan)	28	(1)
2020–2021	→ Coventry City (loan)	39	(2)
2021	→ Stoke City (loan)	13	(1)
2022	→ Genoa (loan)	15	(0)
2022–2024	Napoli	32	(1)
2024–2026	Rennes	16	(1)
2025	→ TSG Hoffenheim (loan)	11	(0)
2025–2026	→ Genoa (loan)	17	(4)
2026–	Genoa	25	(1)

International career^{‡}
2015	Norway U16	8	(1)
2016	Norway U17	9	(2)
2017	Norway U18	10	(1)
2018	Norway U19	7	(1)
2019	Norway U20	5	(2)
2018–2020	Norway U21	10	(2)
2022–	Norway	48	(2)
- * Club domestic league appearances and goals as of 18:24, 22 November 2026 (UTC) ‡ National team caps and goals as of 17 November 2026

Leo Skiri Østigård (born 28 November 1999) is a Norwegian professional footballer who plays as a centre-back for Serie A club Genoa and the Norway national team.

== Club career ==
=== Early career ===
In the winter of 2017, Østigård signed a three-year contract with Molde FK. Ahead of the 2018 season, he went on loan to Viking FK in 1. divisjon.

=== Brighton & Hove Albion ===
After the loan with Viking expired, Østigård signed for Brighton & Hove Albion.

==== Loan to St. Pauli ====
On 19 July 2019, FC St. Pauli signed Østigård on a loan deal until the end of 2019–20 season. He made his debut for the Hamburg based club on 31 August coming on as a substitute in a 3–3 draw against Dynamo Dresden. He made his first start for St. Pauli which was against fierce rivals Hamburger SV where Kiezkicker won 2–0, claiming a first home win in 59 years against their local side.

==== Loan to Coventry City ====
On 27 August 2020, Østigård joined Championship side Coventry City on a season-long loan deal. He made his debut on 12 September in which was his first senior game in English football where he played the full game in a 2–1 away defeat at Bristol City. On 27 February 2021, Østigård was sent off in a 1–1 away draw at Blackburn Rovers after picking up a second yellow card. Østigård scored his first goal in English football on 5 April opening the scoreline in an eventual 3–1 home victory over Bristol City. Østigård returned to The Seagulls with two remaining games of the season due to a thigh injury. He made 39 appearances in the league scoring two goals – 40 apprarances, two goals overall – helping The Sky Blues to safety on their return to the Championship after eight years.

==== Loan to Stoke City ====
On 10 August 2021, Østigård joined Stoke City on loan for the 2021–22 season. He made his debut that evening, playing the whole match of the 2–1 EFL Cup first round victory at home over League One side Fleetwood Town in what was also his League Cup debut. Four days later he made his league debut for The Potters keeping a clean sheet in a 0–0 stalemate away at Birmingham City. On his third appearance he scored Stoke's third goal knocking in a rebound in a 3–1 away victory over Swansea City on 17 August. On 27 December 2021, Østigård was recalled from his loan spell by Brighton.

==== Loan to Genoa ====
Østigård signed for Serie A side Genoa on loan for the rest of the season on 5 January, after progressive previous loan spells and this signing giving him the chance to play at the top level. He made his debut four days later, playing the whole match of the 1–0 home loss against Spezia in the league, in what was his 100th club career appearance. In the week day away fixture against Milan in the Coppa Italia Round of 16 on 13 January, Østigård scored his first ever domestic cup goal opening the scoring in the eventual 3–1 after extra-time loss. He came on as a substitute in the 0–0 away draw at Roma on 5 February, where he was shown a straight red card on the 68th minute. Østigård was sent off for a second time in five matches, this time being shown two yellows after just 24 minutes of play in the 1–0 home victory over Torino on 18 March.

=== Napoli ===
On 10 July 2022, Østigård transferred to Napoli in Serie A on a permanent transfer. On 26 October 2022, he scored a goal on his Champions League debut in a 3–0 win against Rangers.

=== Rennes ===
On 30 July 2024, Østigård transferred to Rennes in Ligue 1 for €7 million to stay until 2027. He made his debut for Rennes on 18 August against Lyon in a 3–0 win, playing all 90 minutes. Against Reims on 1 September, Østigård recorded his first goal for Rennes in the 13th minute, assisted by Ludovic Blas. Rennes went on to lose the game 1–2.

==== Loan to Hoffenheim ====
On 3 February 2025, Østigård was loaned by TSG Hoffenheim in Germany.

=== Return to Genoa ===
On 29 July 2025, Østigård returned to Genoa on loan with an option to buy and a conditional obligation to buy. On 31 January 2026, Genoa made the transfer permanent.

== International career ==
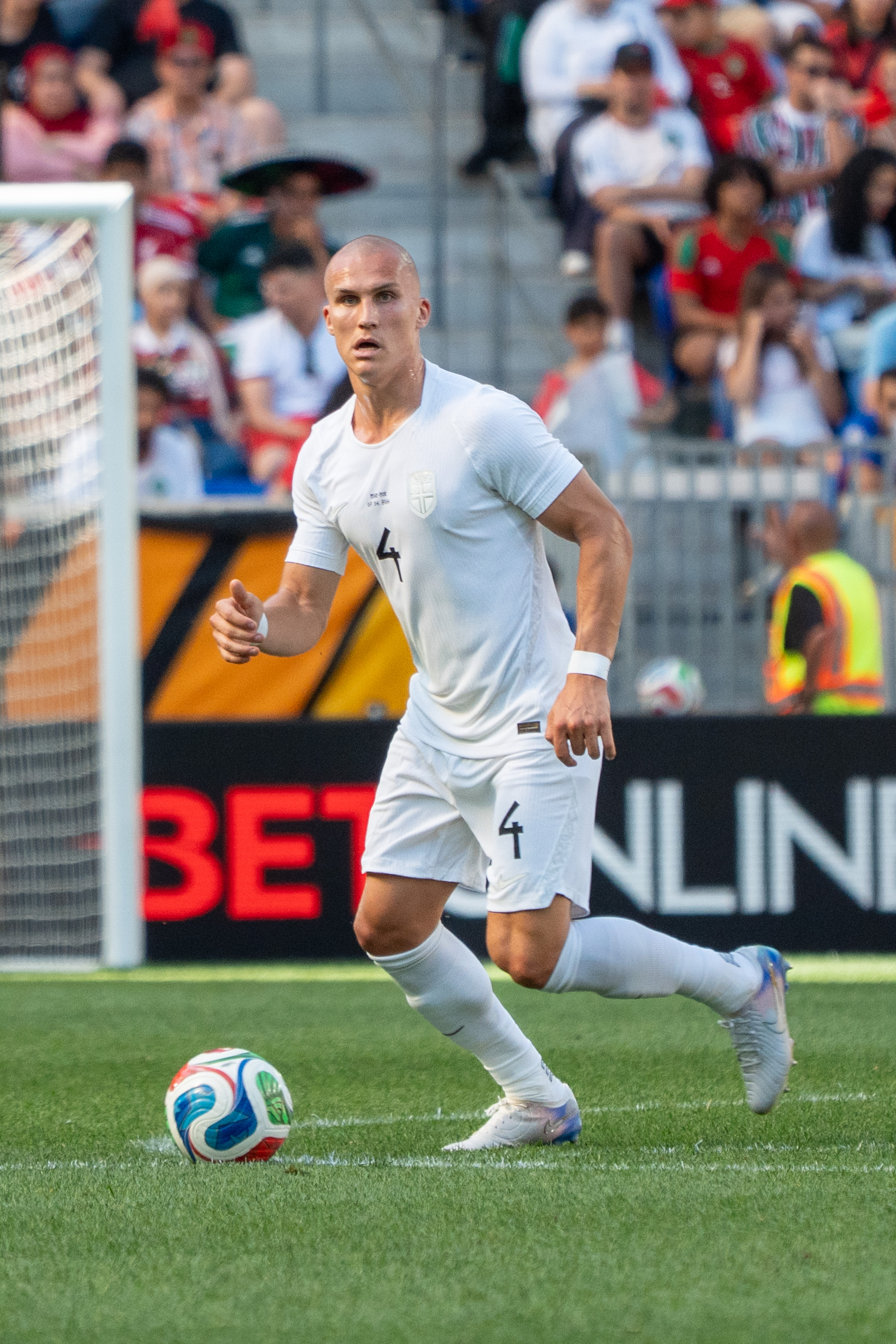
Østigård with Norway in 2026

After being capped at all youth levels he made his senior debut for the Norwegian national team playing the whole match helping keep a clean sheet in a 2–0 friendly win at home over Slovakia on 25 March 2022. He scored his first senior international goal on his eighth appearance on 17 November, heading home from a Martin Ødegaard corner in the 2–1 friendly win away at the Republic of Ireland.

Østigård was included in the 26-man squad selected by Norway national team manager Ståle Solbakken for the 2026 FIFA World Cup. In their opening match against Iraq on 16 June 2026, Østigård scored a goal in the form of a header, contributing to Norway's 4–1 victory.

== Career statistics ==
=== Club ===
As of match played 22 November 2026

Appearances and goals by club, season and competition
Club	Season	League			National cup (Note: Includes Norwegian Cup, DFB-Pokal, FA Cup, Coppa Italia, Coupe de France)		League cup (Note: Includes EFL Cup)		Europe		Other		Total	
Club	Season	Division	Apps	Goals	Apps	Goals	Apps	Goals	Apps	Goals	Apps	Goals	Apps	Goals
Molde	2017	Eliteserien	1	0	0	0	—		—		—		1	0
Molde	2018	Eliteserien	0	0	0	0	—		—		—		0	0
Molde	Total		1	0	0	0	—		—		—		1	0
Viking (loan)	2018	1. divisjon	11	0	2	0	—		—		—		13	0
Brighton & Hove Albion U21	2018–19	Professional Development League	—		—		—		—		1 (Note: Appearance in EFL Trophy)	0	1	0
FC St. Pauli (loan)	2019–20	2. Bundesliga	28	1	1	0	—		—		—		29	1
Coventry City (loan)	2020–21	Championship	39	2	1	0	0	0	—		—		40	2
Stoke City (loan)	2021–22	Championship	13	1	0	0	2	0	—		—		15	1
Genoa (loan)	2021–22	Serie A	15	0	1	1	—		—		—		16	1
Napoli	2022–23	Serie A	7	0	1	0	—		3 (Note: Appearances in UEFA Champions League)	1	—		11	1
Napoli	2023–24	Serie A	25	1	1	0	—		4	1	2 (Note: Appearances in Supercoppa Italiana)	0	32	2
Napoli	Total		32	1	2	0	—		7	2	2	0	43	3
Rennes	2024–25	Ligue 1	16	1	2	0	—		—		—		18	1
TSG Hoffenheim (loan)	2024–25	Bundesliga	11	0	—		—		—		—		11	0
Genoa	2025–26 (Note: Part of this season was spent on loan from Rennes)	Serie A	30	5	1	0	—		—		—		31	5
Genoa	2026–27	Serie A	12	0	1	0	—		—		—		13	0
Genoa	Total		42	5	2	0	—		—		—		44	5
Career total			208	11	11	1	2	0	7	2	3	0	231	14

=== International ===
As of match played 17 November 2026

Appearances and goals by national team and year
National team	Year	Apps	Goals
Norway	2022	9	1
Norway	2023	10	0
Norway	2024	9	0
Norway	2025	6	0
Norway	2026	14	1
Total		48	2

As of match played 4 October 2026
Norway score listed first, score column indicates score after each Østigård goal.

List of international goals scored by Leo Østigård
No.	Date	Venue	Cap	Opponent	Score	Result	Competition	Ref.
1	17 November 2022	Aviva Stadium, Dublin, Ireland	8	Republic of Ireland	1–0	2–1	Friendly	
2	16 June 2026	Gillette Stadium, Foxborough, United States	39	Iraq	3–1	4–1	2026 FIFA World Cup	

== Honours ==
Napoli

- Serie A: 2022–23

== Personal life ==
His older sister Rikke was a very talented handball player at top level, but had to suspend her career at the age of 23 due to her many knee injuries.
