= Rok Vodišek =

Slovenian footballer (born 1998)

Personal information
- Date of birth: 5 December 1998 (age 27)
- Place of birth: Ljubljana, Slovenia
- Height: 1.87 m (6 ft 2 in)
- Position: Goalkeeper

Youth career
- –2017: Olimpija Ljubljana
- 2018–2019: Genoa

Senior career*
Years	Team	Apps	(Gls)
2016–2018	Olimpija Ljubljana	30	(0)
2016	→ Šenčur (loan)	9	(0)
2018–2023	Genoa	0	(0)
2020–2021	→ Triglav Kranj (loan)	11	(0)
2023–2024	Rogaška	11	(0)
2024–2025	Domžale	8	(0)
Total		69	(0)

International career
2014–2015	Slovenia U17 (Note: Official competitive UEFA matches only.)	9	(0)
2015–2016	Slovenia U19	9	(0)
2017–2019	Slovenia U21	4	(0)
2017	Slovenia B	1	(0)
- * Club domestic league appearances and goals

Rok Vodišek (born 5 December 1998) is a Slovenian former professional footballer who played as a goalkeeper.

== Club career ==
Vodišek made his senior debut whilst on loan at Slovenian Second League club Šenčur on 13 March 2016 in a 4–1 loss to Triglav.

The following season, Vodišek returned to his parent club and made his debut for Olimpija Ljubljana on 11 September 2016 in a 1–0 win over Gorica.

On 2 July 2018, Vodišek signed with Italian Serie A club Genoa.

== International career ==
Vodišek represented Slovenia at under-17, under-19, and under-21 levels.

== Career statistics ==
Appearances and goals by club, season and competition
Club	Season	League			National cup (Note: Includes Slovenian Football Cup)		Continental		Other		Total	
Club	Season	Division	Apps	Goals	Apps	Goals	Apps	Goals	Apps	Goals	Apps	Goals
Olimpija Ljubljana	2015–16	Slovenian PrvaLiga	0	0	0	0	—		—		0	0
Olimpija Ljubljana	2016–17	Slovenian PrvaLiga	25	0	6	0	0	0	—		31	0
Olimpija Ljubljana	2017–18	Slovenian PrvaLiga	5	0	0	0	0	0	—		5	0
Olimpija Ljubljana	Total		30	0	6	0	—		—		36	0
Šenčur (loan)	2015–16	Slovenian Second League	9	0	0	0	—		—		9	0
Genoa	2018–19	Serie A	0	0	0	0	—		—		0	0
Genoa	2021–22	Serie A	0	0	0	0	—		—		0	0
Genoa	2022–23	Serie B	0	0	0	0	—		—		0	0
Genoa	Total		0	0	0	0	—		—		0	0
Triglav Kranj (loan)	2020–21	Slovenian Second League	11	0	1	0	—		—		12	0
Rogaška	2023–24	Slovenian PrvaLiga	11	0	1	0	—		—		12	0
Domžale	2024–25	Slovenian PrvaLiga	5	0	—		—		1 (Note: Appearance in Slovenian PrvaLiga promotion/relegation play-offs)	0	6	0
Domžale	2025–26	Slovenian PrvaLiga	3	0	1	0	—		—		4	0
Domžale	Total		8	0	1	0	—		1	0	10	0
Career total			69	0	9	0	0	0	1	0	79	0
