= Mattia Zennaro =

Italian footballer

Personal information
- Date of birth: 3 August 2000 (age 26)
- Place of birth: Venice, Italy
- Height: 1.78 m (5 ft 10 in)
- Position: Midfielder

Team information
- Current team: Union Brescia
- Number: 20

Youth career
- –2018: Venezia

Senior career*
Years	Team	Apps	(Gls)
2018–2019	Venezia	3	(0)
2019–2023	Genoa	0	(0)
2019	→ Venezia (loan)	7	(0)
2021	→ Lucchese (loan)	14	(0)
2021–2022	→ Pergolettese (loan)	34	(4)
2022–2023	→ Feralpisalò (loan)	31	(1)
2023–2025	Feralpisalò	67	(5)
2025–	Union Brescia	21	(1)

International career^{‡}
2019	Italy U19	2	(1)
- * Club domestic league appearances and goals as of 29 April 2026 ‡ National team caps and goals as of 23:17, 12 May 2019 (UTC)

Mattia Zennaro (born 3 August 2000) is an Italian football player who plays as a midfielder for Serie C Group A club Union Brescia.

== Club career ==
He is a Venice native and was raised in the youth teams of Venezia. In October 2018 he signed a professional contract with the club until 2023.

He made his Serie B debut for Venezia on 26 October 2018 in a game against Palermo, as a 79th-minute substitute for Sergiu Suciu.

On 31 January 2019, he signed with Serie A club Genoa, who loaned him back to Venezia until the end of the 2018–19 season.

On 14 January 2021, he joined Serie C club Lucchese on loan.

On 31 July 2021, he was loaned to Serie C club Pergolettese.

On 7 July 2022, Zennaro joined Feralpisalò on loan with an option to buy.

== International career ==
He was first called up to represent his country on 16 January 2019 with Italy national under-19 football team in a friendly against Spain. He scored a goal just one minute after coming on as a substitute in a 3–0 victory.
