= Federico Valietti =

Italian footballer (born 1999)

Personal information
- Date of birth: 25 January 1999 (age 27)
- Place of birth: Bergamo, Italy
- Height: 1.85 m (6 ft 1 in)
- Position: Right-back

Youth career
- –2018: Inter Milan

Senior career*
Years	Team	Apps	(Gls)
2017–2018	Inter Milan	0	(0)
2018–2025	Genoa	0	(0)
2018–2019	→ Crotone (loan)	5	(0)
2019–2020	→ Virtus Entella (loan)	0	(0)
2020	→ Carrarese (loan)	4	(0)
2020–2021	→ Carrarese (loan)	24	(0)
2021–2022	→ Pordenone (loan)	10	(0)
2022–2024	→ Vicenza (loan)	29	(0)
2024	→ Taranto (loan)	16	(1)
2024–2025	→ Trapani (loan)	2	(0)
2025	Trapani	0	(0)
2025–2026	Foggia	16	(0)

International career
2014	Italy U15	7	(0)
2014–2015	Italy U16	9	(0)
2015	Italy U17	5	(0)
2016–2017	Italy U18	4	(0)
2017–2018	Italy U19	2	(0)
2018–2019	Italy U20	4	(0)
- * Club domestic league appearances and goals as of 1 May 2026

Federico Valietti (born 25 January 1999) is an Italian professional footballer who plays as a right-back.

== Club career ==
=== Inter Milan ===
He is a product of Inter youth teams and began to represent their U19 squad in the 2016–17 season. He made his debut for the senior squad on 9 July 2017 in a friendly against WSG Wattens. He also participated with the squad in the 2017 International Champions Cup.

=== Genoa ===
On 29 June 2018, he signed with Genoa, with Inter holding the buy-back option.

==== Loan to Crotone ====
On 13 August 2018, he joined Serie B club Crotone on a season-long loan.

He made his Serie B debut for Crotone on 9 November 2018 in a game against Perugia as an 84th-minute substitute for Salvatore Molina.

==== Loans to Virtus Entella and Carrarese ====
On 9 July 2019, Valietti joined Virtus Entella on loan until 30 June 2020. He did not make any league appearances for Entella, and on 31 January 2020 he moved on a new loan to Serie C club Carrarese. On 5 October 2020 he returned to Carrarese on another loan.

==== Loan to Pordenone ====
On 13 August 2021, Valietti joined Pordenone on loan until 30 June 2023.

==== Loan to Vicenza ====
On 1 September 2022, Valietti moved on a two-year loan at Vicenza.

==== Loan to Taranto ====
On 19 January 2024, Valietti joined Taranto on loan.

==== Loan to Trapani ====
On 22 August 2024, Valietti was loaned by Trapani, with an obligation to buy.

== Career statistics ==
=== Club ===
As of 30 November 2019

Club	Season	League			Cup		Europe		Other		Total	
Club	Season	League	Apps	Goals	Apps	Goals	Apps	Goals	Apps	Goals	Apps	Goals
Crotone (loan)	2018–19	Serie B	5	0	0	0	0	0	0	0	5	0
Virtus Entella (loan)	2019–20	Serie B	0	0	0	0	0	0	0	0	0	0
Career total			5	0	0	0	0	0	0	0	5	0

== International ==
He was first called up to represent his country in early 2014 for Italy national under-15 football team friendlies. He continued to represent his country in every age bracket up to Under-20 team, all in friendlies, he was not selected for any UEFA competition matches.
