= 2018–19 Genoa CFC season =

Genoa
2018–19 season
- President: Enrico Preziosi
- Manager: Davide Ballardini (until 9 October 2018); Ivan Jurić (from 9 October 2018 until 7 December 2018); Cesare Prandelli (from 7 December 2018)
- Stadium: Stadio Luigi Ferraris
- Serie A: 17th
- Coppa Italia: Fourth round
- Top goalscorer: League: Krzysztof Piątek (13); All: Krzysztof Piątek (19)
Home colours	Away colours	Third colours

The 2018–19 season was Genoa Cricket and Football Club's twelfth consecutive season in Serie A. The club competed in Serie A and in the Coppa Italia.

The season was coach Davide Ballardini's first full campaign in charge, after taking over from the sacked Ivan Jurić during the 2017–18 season.

== Players ==
=== Squad information ===
As of 26 May 2019
Appearances include league matches only

No.	Name	Nat	Position(s)	Date of birth (age)	Signed from	Signed in	Contract ends	Apps.	Goals	Notes
Goalkeepers
1	Federico Marchetti	(Italy)	GK	7 February 1983 (aged 36)	(Italy) Lazio	2018	2020	4	0	
23	Alessandro Russo	(Italy)	GK	31 March 2001 (aged 18)	(Italy) Youth Sector	2017	–	0	0	
25	Rok Vodišek	(Slovenia)	GK	5 December 1998 (aged 20)	(Slovenia) Olimpija Ljubljana	2018	2022	0	0	
93	Jandrei	(Brazil)	GK	1 March 1993 (aged 26)	(Brazil) Chapecoense	2019	2021	1	0	
97	Ionuț Radu	(Romania)	GK	28 May 1997 (aged 22)	(Italy) Internazionale	2018	2019	33	0	Loan
Defenders
3	Koray Günter	(Germany)	CB	16 August 1994 (aged 24)	(Turkey) Galatasaray	2018	2021	14	0	
4	Domenico Criscito	(Italy)	LB / LWB / LM / CB	30 December 1986 (aged 32)	(Russia) Zenit Saint Petersburg	2018	2022	188	11	Captain
13	Giuseppe Pezzella	(Italy)	LB / RB / LM	29 November 1997 (aged 21)	(Italy) Udinese	2019	2019	5	0	Loan
14	Davide Biraschi	(Italy)	CB	2 July 1994 (aged 24)	(Italy) Avellino	2016	2022	60	0	
17	Cristian Romero	(Argentina)	CB	27 April 1998 (aged 21)	(Argentina) Belgrano	2018	2023	26	2	
32	Pedro Pereira	(Portugal)	RB / RWB / RM	22 January 1998 (aged 21)	(Portugal) Benfica	2018	2019	32	0	Loan
33	Ivan Lakićević	(Serbia)	RB	27 July 1993 (aged 25)	(Serbia) Vojvodina	2018	2022	0	0	
87	Ervin Zukanović	(Bosnia and Herzegovina)	CB	11 February 1987 (aged 32)	(Italy) Roma	2017	2021	56	0	
Midfielders
8	Lukas Lerager	(Denmark)	CM	12 July 1993 (aged 25)	(France) Bordeaux	2019	2019	14	1	Loan
15	Luca Mazzitelli	(Italy)	CM	15 November 1995 (aged 23)	(Italy) Sassuolo	2018	2019	10	0	Loan
18	Esteban Rolón	(Argentina)	DM / CM	25 March 1995 (aged 24)	(Spain) Málaga	2018	2019	19	0	Loan
21	Ivan Radovanović	(Serbia)	DM / CM	29 August 1988 (aged 30)	(Italy) Chievo	2019	2021	12	0	
22	Darko Lazović	(Serbia)	RM / RW / RWB	15 September 1990 (aged 28)	(Serbia) Red Star Belgrade	2015	2020	102	5	
24	Daniel Bessa	(Italy)	CM / AM / RW	14 January 1993 (aged 26)	(Italy) Hellas Verona	2018	2019	41	3	Loan
27	Stefano Sturaro	(Italy)	CM / RB / DM	9 March 1993 (aged 26)	(Italy) Juventus	2019	2019	5	1	Loan
44	Miguel Veloso	(Portugal)	DM / CM / LB	11 May 1986 (aged 33)	Unattached	2018	—	21	0	
45	Iuri Medeiros	(Portugal)	RW / AM	10 July 1994 (aged 24)	(Portugal) Sporting CP	2018	2019	13	2	Loan
88	Oscar Hiljemark	(Sweden)	CM	28 June 1992 (aged 27)	(Italy) Palermo	2017	2020	46	3	
Forwards
9	Antonio Sanabria	(Paraguay)	CF	4 March 1996 (aged 23)	(Spain) Real Betis	2019	2020	15	3	Loan
10	Gianluca Lapadula	(Italy)	ST	7 February 1990 (aged 29)	(Italy) Milan	2017	2022	36	7	
11	Christian Kouamé	(Ivory Coast)	ST	6 December 1997 (aged 21)	(Italy) Cittadella	2018	2023	38	4	
19	Goran Pandev	(North Macedonia)	SS / AM / RW	27 July 1983 (aged 35)	(Turkey) Galatasaray	2015	2019	92	12	Vice-captain
26	Nicola Dalmonte	(Italy)	ST	13 September 1997 (aged 21)	(Italy) Cesena	2018	–	3	0	
39	Andrea Favilli	(Italy)	ST	17 May 1997 (aged 22)	(Italy) Juventus	2018	2019	6	0	Loan
Players transferred during the season
2	Nicolás Spolli	(Argentina)	CB	20 February 1983 (aged 36)	(Italy) Chievo	2017	2019	28	0	
5	Lisandro López	(Argentina)	CB	1 September 1989 (aged 29)	(Portugal) Benfica	2018	2019	0	0	Loan
8	Rômulo	(Italy)	CM / RB / RM	22 May 1987 (aged 32)	(Italy) Hellas Verona	2018	2020	17	1	
9	Krzysztof Piątek	(Poland)	ST	1 July 1995 (aged 23)	(Poland) Cracovia	2018	2022	19	13	
27	Lorenzo Callegari	(France)	CM	27 February 1998 (aged 21)	(France) Paris Saint-Germain	2018	2022	0	0	
30	Sandro	(Brazil)	DM	15 March 1989 (aged 30)	(Italy) Benevento	2018	2021	13	0	
40	Stéphane Oméonga	(Belgium)	CM	27 March 1996 (aged 23)	(Italy) Avellino	2017	2022	22	0	

== Transfers ==
=== In ===
Date	Pos.	Player	Age	Moving from	Fee	Notes	Source
23 May 2018	GK	(Slovenia) Rok Vodišek	19	(Slovenia) Olimpija Ljubljana	Free		
4 June 2018	DF	(Italy) Domenico Criscito	31	(Russia) Zenit Saint Petersburg	Free		
8 June 2018	DF	(Serbia) Ivan Lakićević	24	(Serbia) Vojvodina	Free		
8 June 2018	FW	(Poland) Krzysztof Piątek	22	(Poland) Cracovia	Undisclosed		
29 June 2018	DF	(Italy) Federico Valietti	19	(Italy) Internazionale	Undisclosed		
2 July 2018	GK	(Italy) Federico Marchetti	35	(Italy) Lazio	Undisclosed		
3 July 2018	MF	(Brazil) Sandro	29	(Italy) Benevento	Undisclosed		
11 July 2018	MF	(Italy) Rômulo	31	(Italy) Hellas Verona	Free		

==== Loans in ====
Date	Pos.	Player	Age	Moving from	Fee	Notes	Source
29 June 2018	GK	(Romania) Ionuț Radu	21	(Italy) Internazionale	Loan	Loan with compulsory purchase option	
6 July 2018	MF	(Italy) Luca Mazzitelli	22	(Italy) Sassuolo	Loan	Loan with compulsory purchase option	
6 February 2019	MF	(Italy) Stefano Sturaro	25	(Italy) Juventus	€16.5M	On 24 January 2019, a loan deal was initially done for €1.5M until end of season with an option to buy for €8.5M + €8M variables, however, later made a permanent deal for €16.5M on 6 February 2019.	

=== Out ===
Date	Pos.	Player	Age	Moving to	Fee	Notes	Source
8 June 2018	GK	(Italy) Mattia Perin	25	(Italy) Juventus	€12M	€12M + €3M in bonuses	
1 July 2018	FW	(Italy) Riccardo Improta	24	(Italy) Benevento	Undisclosed		
4 July 2018	DF	(Italy) Armando Izzo	26	(Italy) Torino	€8M	€8M + €2M in bonuses	

==== Loans out ====
Date	Pos.	Player	Age	Moving to	Fee	Notes	Source

== Competitions ==
=== Serie A ===
==== League table ====
Pos	Team	Pld	W	D	L	GF	GA	GD	Pts	Qualification or relegation
15	Cagliari	38	10	11	17	36	54	−18	41 (Note: Positions determined by head-to-head points: Parma: 9 pts; Cagliari: 7 pts; Fiorentina: 1 pt.)	
16	Fiorentina	38	8	17	13	47	45	+2	41	
17	Genoa	38	8	14	16	39	57	−18	38 (Note: Genoa finished ahead of Empoli on head-to-head points: Genoa 2–1 Empoli, Empoli 1–3 Genoa.)	
18	Empoli (R)	38	10	8	20	51	70	−19	38	Relegation to Serie B
19	Frosinone (R)	38	5	10	23	29	69	−40	25	Relegation to Serie B

Source: Serie A, Soccerway
Rules for classification: 1) Points; 2) Head-to-head points; 3) Head-to-head goal difference; 4) Goal difference; 5) Goals scored; 6) Draw. (Note: Head-to-head record is used only after all the matches between the teams in question have been played).
(R) Relegated

==== Results summary ====
Overall								Home						Away					
Pld	W	D	L	GF	GA	GD	Pts	W	D	L	GF	GA	GD	W	D	L	GF	GA	GD
38	8	14	16	39	57	−18	38	6	8	5	21	22	−1	2	6	11	18	35	−17

Last updated: 26 May 2019.
Source: Competitive matches

==== Results by round ====
Round	1	2	3	4	5	6	7	8	9	10	11	12	13	14	15	16	17	18	19	20	21	22	23	24	25	26	27	28	29	30	31	32	33	34	35	36	37	38
Ground	A	H	A	H	A	H	A	H	A	H	A	H	H	A	H	A	H	A	H	H	A	H	A	H	A	H	A	H	A	H	A	A	H	A	H	A	H	A
Result	L	W	L	W	L	W	W	L	D	D	L	L	D	L	D	L	W	L	D	L	W	D	D	W	D	D	L	W	L	L	D	L	L	D	D	L	D	D
Position	11	9	15	7	11	7	6	11	9	11	13	14	14	14	15	16	13	14	14	14	13	13	13	13	12	12	13	11	11	11	13	15	16	16	16	17	18	17

Updated to match(es) played on 26 May 2019. Source: Competitive matches
A = Away; H = Home; W = Win; D = Draw; L = Loss; P = Postponed

==== Matches ====
26 August 2018 2	Genoa	2–1	Empoli	Genoa
20:30 CEST (UTC+02:00)	Piątek 6'; Kouamé 18'; Spolli (yellow card) 45'; Criscito (yellow card) 52'; Zukanović (yellow card) 59'	Report	Silvestre (yellow card) 85'; Krunić (yellow card) 90+2'; Mráz 90+4'	Stadium: Stadio Luigi Ferraris; Attendance: 19,493; Referee: Livio Marinelli

2 September 2018 3	Sassuolo	5–3	Genoa	Reggio Emilia
20:30 CEST (UTC+02:00)	Rogério (yellow card) 31'; Magnani (yellow card) 33'; Boateng 34'; Lirola 38'; Babacar 41'; Spolli 45+2' (o.g.); Ferrari 62'; Duncan (yellow card) 90+2'	Report	Piątek 27', 83', (yellow card) 29'; Criscito (yellow card) 52'; Pandev 70'; Bessa (yellow card) 90+1'	Stadium: Mapei Stadium – Città del Tricolore; Attendance: 9,740; Referee: Gianluca Rocchi

16 September 2018 4	Genoa	1–0	Bologna	Genoa
15:00 CEST (UTC+02:00)	Bessa (yellow card) 65'; Piątek 69'; Marchetti (yellow card) 90+8'	Report	Destro (yellow card) 2'; Dijks (yellow card) 39'; González (yellow card) 57'; Džemaili (yellow card) 61'; Pulgar (red card) 90+7'; Skorupski (yellow card) 90+8'	Stadium: Stadio Luigi Ferraris; Attendance: 20,032; Referee: Luca Banti

23 September 2018 5	Lazio	4–1	Genoa	Rome
15:00 CEST (UTC+02:00)	Caicedo 7'; Immobile 23', 89'; Milinković-Savić 53'; Badelj (yellow card) 80'	Report	Spolli (yellow card) 11'; Bessa (yellow card) 45+1'; Piątek 46'	Stadium: Stadio Olimpico; Attendance: 30,000; Referee: Rosario Abisso

26 September 2018 6	Genoa	2–0	Chievo	Genoa
21:00 CEST (UTC+02:00)	Criscito (yellow card) 12'; Kouamé (yellow card) 15'; Pandev (yellow card) 31', (goal) 54'; Piątek (yellow card) 37', (goal) 42'	Report	Léris (yellow card) 3'; Hetemaj (yellow card) 30'; Depaoli (yellow card) 56'; Rossettini (yellow card) 85'	Stadium: Stadio Luigi Ferraris; Attendance: 18,969; Referee: Fabrizio Pasqua

30 September 2018 7	Frosinone	1–2	Genoa	Frosinone
15:00 CEST (UTC+02:00)	Goldaniga (yellow card) 20'; Ciano 41' (pen.); Hallfreðsson (yellow card) 56'; Campbell (yellow card) 61'	Report	Piątek 33', 36'; Sandro (yellow card) 70'; Mazzitelli (yellow card) 84'	Stadium: Stadio Benito Stirpe; Attendance: 12,384; Referee: Juan Luca Sacchi

7 October 2018 8	Genoa	1–3	Parma	Genoa
12:30 CEST (UTC+02:00)	Piątek 6', (yellow card) 50'	Report	Rigoni 16'; Siligardi 26'; Ceravolo 30'; Alves (yellow card) 51'	Stadium: Stadio Luigi Ferraris; Attendance: 20,511; Referee: Daniele Chiffi

20 October 2018 9	Juventus	1–1	Genoa	Turin
18:00 CEST (UTC+02:00)	Ronaldo 18'; Benatia (yellow card) 30'	Report	Romero (yellow card) 9'; Bessa 67'; Criscito (yellow card) 71'; Pandev (yellow card) 90'	Stadium: Allianz Stadium; Attendance: 37,735; Referee: Federico La Penna

28 October 2018 10	Genoa	2–2	Udinese	Genoa
15:00 CET (UTC+01:00)	Rômulo 32' (pen.); Biraschi (yellow card) 37'; Romero (yellow card) 56' (yellow-red card) 74', (goal) 67'; Kouamé (yellow card) 58'; Mazzitelli (yellow card) 81'	Report	Samir (yellow card) 15'; Behrami (yellow card) 19'; Opoku (yellow card) 24'; Lasagna 65'; Musso (yellow card) 66'; De Paul 70'	Stadium: Stadio Luigi Ferraris; Attendance: 18,880; Referee: Paolo Mazzoleni

31 October 2018 1	Milan	2–1	Genoa	Milan
20:30 CET (UTC+02:00)	Suso 4'; Kessié (yellow card) 50'; Rodríguez (yellow card) 83'; Romagnoli 90+1'	Report	Criscito (yellow card) 43'; Romagnoli 56' (o.g.); Veloso (yellow card) 80'	Stadium: San Siro; Attendance: 46,720; Referee: Fabrizio Pasqua
Note: Match was postponed from its original date of 19 August due to the collapse of the Ponte Morandi bridge in Genoa, which resulted in the deaths of 43 people.

3 November 2018 11	Internazionale	5–0	Genoa	Milan
15:00 CET (UTC+01:00)	D'Ambrosio (yellow card) 8'; Gagliardini 14', 49'; Politano 16'; Martínez (yellow card) 31'; João Mário 90+1'; Nainggolan 90+4'	Report	Günter (yellow card) 18'; Sandro (yellow card) 34'; Veloso (yellow card) 74'	Stadium: San Siro; Attendance: 67,532; Referee: Paolo Valeri

10 November 2018 12	Genoa	1–2	Napoli	Genoa
18:00 CET (UTC+01:00)	Kouamé 20'; Bessa (yellow card) 77'; Oméonga (yellow card) 85'; Criscito (yellow card) 87'; Mazzitelli (yellow card) 90+3'	Report	Insigne (yellow card) 45+1'; Fabián 62'; Biraschi 86' (o.g.); Malcuit (yellow card) 90+2'	Stadium: Stadio Luigi Ferraris; Attendance: 25,365; Referee: Rosario Abisso

25 November 2018 13	Genoa	1–1	Sampdoria	Genoa
20:30 CET (UTC+01:00)	Piątek 17' (pen.); Criscito (yellow card) 73'; Sandro (yellow card) 85'	Report	Quagliarella 8'; Audero (yellow card) 17'	Stadium: Stadio Luigi Ferraris; Attendance: 33,727; Referee: Daniele Doveri

2 December 2018 14	Torino	2–1	Genoa	Turin
15:00 CET (UTC+01:00)	Ansaldi 45+2'; Belotti 45+5' (pen.); Meïté (yellow card) 65'; Nkoulou (yellow card) 76'; Zaza (yellow card) 88'	Report	Rômulo (yellow card) 25' (yellow-red card) 28'; Kouamé 36'; Biraschi (yellow card) 76'; Bessa (yellow card) 86'	Stadium: Stadio Olimpico Grande Torino; Attendance: 15,324; Referee: Maurizio Mariani

9 December 2018 15	Genoa	1–1	SPAL	Genoa
18:00 CET (UTC+01:00)	Criscito (red card) 11'; Piątek 38' (pen.); Veloso (yellow card) 55'	Report	Petagna 15', (yellow card) 25'; Bonifazi (yellow card) 34'; Vicari (yellow card) 81'; Floccari (yellow card) 85'; Valdifiori (yellow card) 87'	Stadium: Stadio Luigi Ferraris; Attendance: 19,571; Referee: Fabrizio Pasqua

16 December 2018 16	Roma	3–2	Genoa	Rome
20:30 CET (UTC+01:00)	Fazio 31'; Kluivert 45'; Zaniolo (yellow card) 48'; Cristante 59'; Schick (yellow card) 87'	Report	Zukanović (yellow card) 14'; Piątek 17'; Hiljemark 33'; Rolón (yellow card) 90+3'	Stadium: Stadio Olimpico; Attendance: 29,111; Referee: Marco Di Bello

22 December 2018 17	Genoa	3–1	Atalanta	Genoa
15:00 CET (UTC+01:00)	Romero (yellow card) 4'; Toloi 45+6' (o.g.); Criscito (yellow card) 55'; Lazović 67'; Rolón (yellow card) 71'; Piątek 88'	Report	Palomino (yellow card) 12' (yellow-red card) 81'; Zapata 55' (pen.); Toloi (red card) 90+3'	Stadium: Stadio Luigi Ferraris; Attendance: 19,841; Referee: Daniele Doveri

26 December 2018 18	Cagliari	1–0	Genoa	Cagliari
15:00 CET (UTC+01:00)	Farias 45+3', (yellow card) 45+3'; Faragò (yellow card) 65'; Cigarini (yellow card) 75'	Report	Romero (yellow card) 1'; Rolón (yellow card) 41'; Piątek (yellow card) 82'	Stadium: Sardegna Arena; Attendance: 15,777; Referee: Daniele Orsato

29 December 2018 19	Genoa	0–0	Fiorentina	Genoa
15:00 CET (UTC+01:00)	Piątek (yellow card) 75'; Lazović (yellow card) 90+1'	Report	Biraghi (yellow card) 68'	Stadium: Stadio Luigi Ferraris; Attendance: 21,270; Referee: Davide Massa

21 January 2019 20	Genoa	0–2	Milan	Genoa
15:00 CET (UTC+01:00)	Romero (yellow card) 41'; Rolón (yellow card) 70'; Zukanović (yellow card) 77'	Report	Borini (yellow card) 8', (goal) 72'; Cutrone (yellow card) 45+1'; Paquetá (yellow card) 58'; Suso 83'	Stadium: Stadio Luigi Ferraris; Attendance: 19,794; Referee: Daniele Orsato

28 January 2019 21	Empoli	1–3	Genoa	Empoli
20:30 CET (UTC+01:00)	Rasmussen (yellow card) 61'; Di Lorenzo 63'	Report	Kouamé 18'; Bessa (yellow card) 39'; Rolón (yellow card) 58'; Lazović 70'; Sanabria 73'	Stadium: Stadio Carlo Castellani; Attendance: 7,675; Referee: Federico La Penna

3 February 2019 22	Genoa	1–1	Sassuolo	Genoa
15:00 CET (UTC+01:00)	Sanabria 41'; Romero (yellow card) 54'	Report	Đuričić 28'; Duncan (yellow card) 44'; Bourabia (yellow card) 64'; Rogério (yellow card) 88'	Stadium: Stadio Luigi Ferraris; Attendance: 18,927; Referee: Gianluca Manganiello

10 February 2019 23	Bologna	1–1	Genoa	Bologna
12:30 CET (UTC+01:00)	Destro 17'; Palacio (yellow card) 58'; Mbaye (yellow card) 81'	Report	Lerager 33'; Lazović (yellow card) 64'; Sanabria (yellow card) 86'	Stadium: Stadio Renato Dall'Ara; Attendance: 17,385; Referee: Gianluca Rocchi

17 February 2019 24	Genoa	2–1	Lazio	Genoa
15:00 CET (UTC+01:00)	Sanabria 75'; Romero (yellow card) 79'; Pandev (yellow card) 90+1'; Criscito 90+3', (yellow card) 90+4'	Report	Badelj 44', (yellow card) 90'; Patric (yellow card) 70'	Stadium: Stadio Luigi Ferraris; Attendance: 19,936; Referee: Luca Banti

24 February 2019 25	Chievo	0–0	Genoa	Verona
15:00 CET (UTC+01:00)	Kiyine (yellow card) 36'; Hetemaj (yellow card) 84'	Report	Lerager (yellow card) 26'; Kouamé (yellow card) 85'; Biraschi (yellow card) 90+4'	Stadium: Stadio Marc'Antonio Bentegodi; Attendance: 10,500; Referee: Manuel Volpi

3 March 2019 26	Genoa	0–0	Frosinone	Genoa
15:00 CET (UTC+01:00)	Zukanović (yellow card) 36'; Kouamé (yellow card) 74'	Report	Cassata (yellow card) 21', (red card) 34'; Viviani (yellow card) 25'; Ciofani (yellow card) 82'	Stadium: Stadio Luigi Ferraris; Attendance: 19,920; Referee: Maurizio Mariani

9 March 2019 27	Parma	1–0	Genoa	Parma
18:00 CET (UTC+01:00)	Scozzarella (yellow card) 68'; Kucka 78'; Alves (yellow card) 85'	Report	Radovanović (yellow card) 43'	Stadium: Stadio Ennio Tardini; Attendance: 14,787; Referee: Juan Luca Sacchi

17 March 2019 28	Genoa	2–0	Juventus	Genoa
12:30 CET (UTC+01:00)	Romero (yellow card) 3'; Sturaro 72'; Pandev 81', (yellow card) 82'	Report	Alex Sandro (yellow card) 6'; Cáceres (yellow card) 23'; Can (yellow card) 85'	Stadium: Stadio Luigi Ferraris; Attendance: 30,695; Referee: Marco Di Bello

30 March 2019 29	Udinese	2–0	Genoa	Udine
15:00 CET (UTC+01:00)	Okaka 4'; Stryger Larsen (yellow card) 33'; Sandro (yellow card) 38'; Zeegelaar (yellow card) 40'; Mandragora 62'	Report	Rolón (yellow card) 5'; Criscito (yellow card) 42'; Bessa (yellow card) 46'; Pereira (yellow card) 78'	Stadium: Dacia Arena; Attendance: 17,072; Referee: Luca Pairetto

3 April 2019 30	Genoa	0–4	Internazionale	Genoa
21:00 CEST (UTC+02:00)	Lerager (yellow card) 14'; Zukanović (yellow card) 36'; Romero (red card) 39'	Report	Gagliardini 15', 81'; Asamoah (yellow card) 27'; Icardi 40' (pen.); Perišić 54'	Stadium: Stadio Luigi Ferraris; Attendance: 21,865; Referee: Maurizio Mariani

7 April 2019 31	Napoli	1–1	Genoa	Naples
20:30 CEST (UTC+02:00)	Allan (yellow card) 24'; Mertens 34'; Hysaj (yellow card) 67'	Report	Sturaro (red card) 28'; Lazović 45+3'	Stadium: Stadio San Paolo; Attendance: 22,935; Referee: Fabrizio Pasqua

14 April 2019 32	Sampdoria	2–0	Genoa	Genoa
15:00 CEST (UTC+02:00)	Defrel 3'; Linetty (yellow card) 30'; Quagliarella 53' (pen.); Gabbiadini (yellow card) 90+1'	Report	Criscito (yellow card) 8'; Biraschi (red card) 51'; Pandev (yellow card) 60'; Romero (yellow card) 66'; Veloso (yellow card) 79'; Lerager (yellow card) 88'	Stadium: Stadio Luigi Ferraris; Attendance: 30,548; Referee: Gianpaolo Calvarese

20 April 2019 33	Genoa	0–1	Torino	Genoa
15:00 CEST (UTC+02:00)	Lerager (yellow card) 9'; Rolón (yellow card) 51'; Veloso (yellow card) 55'; Radovanović (yellow card) 89'	Report	Nkoulou (yellow card) 20'; Ansaldi 58'; Moretti (yellow card) 78'; Baselli (yellow card) 82'; Parigini (yellow card) 88'	Stadium: Stadio Luigi Ferraris; Attendance: 20,708; Referee: Daniele Doveri

28 April 2019 34	SPAL	1–1	Genoa	Ferrara
15:00 CEST (UTC+02:00)	Felipe (yellow card) 4', (goal) 36'; Vicari (yellow card) 39'; Petagna (yellow card) 54'	Report	Lapadula 57', (yellow card) 81'; Romero (yellow card) 62'; Rolón (yellow card) 66'	Stadium: Stadio Paolo Mazza; Attendance: 13,573; Referee: Davide Massa

5 May 2019 35	Genoa	1–1	Roma	Genoa
18:00 CEST (UTC+02:00)	Romero 90+1'; Rolón (yellow card) 90+6'	Report	Zaniolo (yellow card) 51'; El Shaarawy 82'; Kluivert (yellow card) 84'	Stadium: Stadio Luigi Ferraris; Attendance: 20,703; Referee: Paolo Mazzoleni

11 May 2019 36	Atalanta	2–1	Genoa	Bergamo
15:00 CEST (UTC+02:00)	Palomino (yellow card) 34'; Barrow 46'; Castagne 53'	Report	Veloso (yellow card) 7'; Pandev (yellow card) 59', (goal) 89'; Romero (yellow card) 84'	Stadium: Stadio Atleti Azzurri d'Italia; Attendance: 12,000; Referee: Massimiliano Irrati

18 May 2019 37	Genoa	1–1	Cagliari	Genoa
18:00 CEST (UTC+02:00)	Criscito (yellow card) 31', (goal) 89' (pen.); Veloso (yellow card) 77'; Pezzella (red card) 90+3'	Report	Klavan (yellow card) 22'; Pavoletti 40'	Stadium: Stadio Luigi Ferraris; Attendance: 22,768; Referee: Paolo Valeri

26 May 2019 38	Fiorentina	0–0	Genoa	Florence
20:30 CEST (UTC+02:00)	Gerson (yellow card) 21'	Report	Radovanović (yellow card) 81'; Bessa (yellow card) 84'	Stadium: Stadio Artemio Franchi; Attendance: 37,527; Referee: Daniele Orsato

=== Coppa Italia ===
11 August 2018 Third round	Genoa	4–0	Lecce	Genoa
21:15 CEST (UTC+02:00)	Piątek 2', 9', 19', 37'	Report		Stadium: Stadio Luigi Ferraris; Attendance: 10,000; Referee: Federico La Penna

6 December 2018 Fourth round	Genoa	3–3 (6–7 p)	Virtus Entella	Genoa
18:00 CET (UTC+01:00)	Piątek 27' (pen.), 86' (pen.); López (yellow card) 32'; Lapadula 110' (pen.), (yellow card) 110'	Report	Icardi 20', 83'; Ardizzone (yellow card) 27'; Adorján (yellow card) 29', (goal) 120+2'; Di Paola (yellow card) 105+1'	Stadium: Stadio Luigi Ferraris; Attendance: 2,795; Referee: Valerio Marini
	Penalties
	Bessa (penalty missed); Veloso (penalty scored); Sandro (penalty scored); Biraschi (penalty scored); Piątek (penalty scored); Zukanović (penalty scored); Rômulo (penalty scored); Lapadula (penalty missed)		(penalty scored) Mota; (penalty scored) Nizzetto; (penalty missed) Baroni; (penalty scored) Belli; (penalty scored) Paolucci; (penalty scored) Di Paola; (penalty scored) Icardi; (penalty scored) Adorján

== Statistics ==
=== Appearances and goals ===
No.	Pos	Nat	Player	Total		Serie A		Coppa Italia	
No.	Pos	Nat	Player	Apps	Goals	Apps	Goals	Apps	Goals
Goalkeepers
1	GK	(Italy) ITA	Federico Marchetti	6	0	4	0	2	0
25	GK	(Slovenia) SVN	Rok Vodišek	0	0	0	0	0	0
93	GK	(Brazil) BRA	Jandrei	1	0	1	0	0	0
97	GK	(Romania) ROU	Ionuț Radu	33	0	33	0	0	0
Defenders
3	DF	(Germany) GER	Koray Günter	15	0	8+6	0	0+1	0
4	DF	(Italy) ITA	Domenico Criscito	36	2	35	2	1	0
13	DF	(Italy) ITA	Giuseppe Pezzella	5	0	1+4	0	0	0
14	DF	(Italy) ITA	Davide Biraschi	36	0	32+2	0	2	0
17	DF	(Argentina) ARG	Cristian Romero	27	2	27	2	0	0
32	DF	(Portugal) POR	Pedro Pereira	27	0	15+11	0	1	0
33	DF	(Serbia) SRB	Ivan Lakićević	0	0	0	0	0	0
87	DF	(Bosnia and Herzegovina) BIH	Ervin Zukanović	27	0	22+3	0	2	0
Midfielders
8	MF	(Denmark) DEN	Lukas Lerager	14	1	13+1	1	0	0
15	MF	(Italy) ITA	Luca Mazzitelli	11	0	3+7	0	0+1	0
18	MF	(Argentina) ARG	Esteban Rolón	20	0	10+9	0	1	0
21	MF	(Serbia) SRB	Ivan Radovanović	16	0	15+1	0	0	0
24	MF	(Italy) ITA	Daniel Bessa	36	1	25+9	1	0+2	0
27	MF	(Italy) ITA	Stefano Sturaro	5	1	4+1	1	0	0
44	MF	(Portugal) POR	Miguel Veloso	22	0	14+7	0	0+1	0
88	MF	(Sweden) SWE	Oscar Hiljemark	18	1	15+2	1	1	0
Forwards
9	FW	(Paraguay) PAR	Antonio Sanabria	15	3	9+6	3	0	0
10	FW	(Italy) ITA	Gianluca Lapadula	9	2	4+4	1	1	1
11	FW	(Ivory Coast) CIV	Christian Kouamé	39	4	33+5	4	1	0
19	FW	(North Macedonia) MKD	Goran Pandev	28	4	12+14	4	1+1	0
22	FW	(Serbia) SRB	Darko Lazović	34	3	30+3	3	1	0
26	FW	(Italy) ITA	Nicola Dalmonte	3	0	0+3	0	0	0
39	FW	(Italy) ITA	Andrea Favilli	6	0	0+6	0	0	0
Players transferred out during the season
2	DF	(Argentina) ARG	Nicolás Spolli	8	0	7	0	1	0
5	DF	(Argentina) ARG	Lisandro López	1	0	0	0	1	0
8	MF	(Italy) ITA	Rômulo	19	1	17	1	2	0
9	FW	(Poland) POL	Krzysztof Piątek	21	19	18+1	13	2	6
30	MF	(Brazil) BRA	Sandro	14	0	9+4	0	0+1	0
40	MF	(Belgium) BEL	Stéphane Oméonga	4	0	0+3	0	1	0
45	MF	(Portugal) POR	Iuri Medeiros	3	0	2	0	1	0

Last updated: 26 May 2019
Source: Competitions

=== Goalscorers ===
Rank	No.	Pos	Nat	Name	Serie A	Coppa Italia	Total
1	9	FW	(Poland)	Krzysztof Piątek	13	6	19
2	11	FW	(Ivory Coast)	Christian Kouamé	4	0	4
2	19	FW	(North Macedonia)	Goran Pandev	4	0	4
4	9	FW	(Paraguay)	Antonio Sanabria	3	0	3
4	22	FW	(Serbia)	Darko Lazović	3	0	3
6	4	DF	(Italy)	Domenico Criscito	2	0	2
6	10	FW	(Italy)	Gianluca Lapadula	1	1	2
6	17	DF	(Argentina)	Cristian Romero	2	0	2
9	8	MF	(Denmark)	Lukas Lerager	1	0	1
9	8	MF	(Italy)	Rômulo	1	0	1
9	24	MF	(Italy)	Daniel Bessa	1	0	1
9	27	MF	(Italy)	Stefano Sturaro	1	0	1
9	88	MF	(Sweden)	Oscar Hiljemark	1	0	1
Own goal					2	0	2
Totals					39	7	46

Last updated: 26 May 2019

=== Clean sheets ===
Rank	No.	Pos	Nat	Name	Serie A	Coppa Italia	Total
1	97	GK	(Romania)	Ionuț Radu	6	0	6
2	1	GK	(Italy)	Federico Marchetti	1	1	2
Totals					7	1	8

Last updated: 26 May 2019

=== Disciplinary record ===
No.	Pos	Nat	Name	Serie A			Coppa Italia			Total		
No.	Pos	Nat	Name	Booked	(yellow card) (yellow-red card)	Sent off (straight red)	Booked	(yellow card) (yellow-red card)	Sent off (straight red)	Booked	(yellow card) (yellow-red card)	Sent off (straight red)
1	GK	(Italy)	Federico Marchetti	1	0	0	0	0	0	1	0	0
2	DF	(Argentina)	Nicolás Spolli	2	0	0	0	0	0	2	0	0
3	DF	(Germany)	Koray Günter	1	0	0	0	0	0	1	0	0
4	DF	(Italy)	Domenico Criscito	12	0	1	0	0	0	12	0	1
5	DF	(Argentina)	Lisandro López	0	0	0	1	0	0	1	0	0
13	DF	(Italy)	Giuseppe Pezzella	0	0	1	0	0	0	0	0	1
14	DF	(Italy)	Davide Biraschi	3	0	1	0	0	0	3	0	1
17	DF	(Argentina)	Cristian Romero	10	1	1	0	0	0	10	1	1
32	DF	(Portugal)	Pedro Pereira	1	0	0	0	0	0	1	0	0
87	DF	(Bosnia and Herzegovina)	Ervin Zukanović	5	0	0	0	0	0	5	0	0
8	MF	(Denmark)	Lukas Lerager	4	0	0	0	0	0	4	0	0
8	MF	(Italy)	Rômulo	0	1	0	0	0	0	0	1	0
15	MF	(Italy)	Luca Mazzitelli	3	0	0	0	0	0	3	0	0
18	MF	(Argentina)	Esteban Rolón	9	0	0	0	0	0	9	0	0
21	MF	(Serbia)	Ivan Radovanović	3	0	0	0	0	0	3	0	0
24	MF	(Italy)	Daniel Bessa	8	0	0	0	0	0	8	0	0
27	MF	(Italy)	Stefano Sturaro	0	0	1	0	0	0	0	0	1
30	MF	(Brazil)	Sandro	3	0	0	0	0	0	3	0	0
40	MF	(Belgium)	Stéphane Oméonga	1	0	0	0	0	0	1	0	0
44	MF	(Portugal)	Miguel Veloso	7	0	0	0	0	0	7	0	0
9	FW	(Poland)	Krzysztof Piątek	5	0	0	0	0	0	5	0	0
9	FW	(Paraguay)	Antonio Sanabria	1	0	0	0	0	0	1	0	0
10	FW	(Italy)	Gianluca Lapadula	1	0	0	1	0	0	2	0	0
11	FW	(Ivory Coast)	Christian Kouamé	4	0	0	0	0	0	4	0	0
19	FW	(North Macedonia)	Goran Pandev	6	0	0	0	0	0	6	0	0
22	FW	(Serbia)	Darko Lazović	2	0	0	0	0	0	2	0	0
Totals				92	2	5	2	0	0	94	2	5

Last updated: 26 May 2019
