= 2017–18 Genoa CFC season =

Genoa
2017–18 season
- President: Enrico Preziosi
- Manager: Ivan Jurić (until 5 November 2017); Davide Ballardini (from 6 November 2017)
- Stadium: Stadio Luigi Ferraris
- Serie A: 12th
- Coppa Italia: Round of 16
- Top goalscorer: League: Gianluca Lapadula (6); All: Gianluca Lapadula (6)
- Highest home attendance: 32,288 vs Sampdoria (4 November 2017, Serie A)
- Lowest home attendance: 4,149 vs Crotone (30 November 2017, Coppa Italia)
- Average home league attendance: 20,941
Home colours	Away colours	Third colours

The 2017–18 season was Genoa Cricket and Football Club's eleventh consecutive season in Serie A. Having finished 16th the previous season, the club managed to improve on its league position, finishing 12th in Serie A, while they were eliminated in the Coppa Italia by eventual champions Juventus.

== Players ==
=== Squad information ===
As of 31 January 2018

Note: Flags indicate national team as defined under FIFA eligibility rules; some limited exceptions apply. Players may hold more than one non-FIFA nationality.

No.	Pos.	Nation	Player
1	GK	ITA	Mattia Perin (captain)
2	DF	ARG	Nicolás Spolli
3	DF	ARG	Santiago Gentiletti
4	MF	GHA	Isaac Cofie
5	DF	ITA	Armando Izzo
8	MF	ITA	Andrea Bertolacci (on loan from Milan)
10	FW	ITA	Gianluca Lapadula (on loan from Milan)
11	MF	MAR	Adel Taarabt (on loan from Benfica)
13	DF	ITA	Luca Rossettini
13	DF	ITA	Davide Biraschi
15	MF	SWE	Oscar Hiljemark
16	FW	BUL	Andrey Galabinov
18	DF	ITA	Francesco Migliore
19	FW	MKD	Goran Pandev
20	DF	ITA	Aleandro Rosi
21	MF	CRO	Petar Brlek

No.	Pos.	Nation	Player
22	MF	SRB	Darko Lazović
23	GK	ITA	Eugenio Lamanna
30	MF	ITA	Luca Rigoni
33	DF	FRA	Loïck Landre
38	GK	CZE	Lukas Zima
40	MF	BEL	Stéphane Oméonga
44	MF	POR	Miguel Veloso
45	FW	POR	Iuri Medeiros (on loan from Sporting CP)
49	FW	ITA	Giuseppe Rossi
74	FW	ITA	Eddie Salcedo
87	DF	BIH	Ervin Zukanović (on loan from Roma)
93	MF	URU	Diego Laxalt
—	DF	POR	Pedro Pereira (on loan from Benfica)
—	MF	ITA	Daniel Bessa (on loan from Verona)
—	DF	MAR	Jawad El Yamiq
—	DF	ITA	Antonio Candela

== Transfers ==
=== In ===
Date	Pos.	Player	Age	Moving from	Fee	Notes	Source
9 July 2017	DF	(Argentina) Nicolás Spolli	34	Unattached	Free		
18 August 2017	DF	(Italy) Luca Rossettini	32	(Italy) Torino	€2M		
4 December 2017	FW	(Italy) Giuseppe Rossi	30	Unattached	Free		

==== Loans in ====
Date	Pos.	Player	Age	Moving from	Fee	Notes	Source
11 July 2017	DF	(Bosnia and Herzegovina) Ervin Zukanović	30	(Italy) Roma	Loan	Loan with an obligation to buy	
15 July 2017	MF	(Italy) Andrea Bertolacci	26	(Italy) Milan	Loan		
18 July 2017	FW	(Italy) Gianluca Lapadula	27	(Italy) Milan	Loan	Loan with an obligation to buy	

=== Out ===
Date	Pos.	Player	Age	Moving to	Fee	Notes	Source
27 June 2017	DF	(Argentina) Lucas Orbán	28	Unattached	Free	Contract termination	
1 July 2017	DF	(Argentina) Nicolás Burdisso	36	(Italy) Torino	End of contract		
1 July 2017	MF	(France) Olivier Ntcham	21	(England) Manchester City	Loan return		
20 July 2017	FW	(Chile) Mauricio Pinilla	33	Unattached	Free	Contract termination	
16 August 2017	FW	(Argentina) Giovanni Simeone	22	(Italy) Fiorentina	€15M	€15M + €3M in bonuses	
27 January 2018	FW	(Italy) Pietro Pellegri	16	(France) Monaco	€25M		

==== Loans out ====
Date	Pos.	Player	Age	Moving to	Fee	Notes	Source
31 August 2017	MF	(Sweden) Oscar Hiljemark	25	(Greece) Panathinaikos	Loan	Loan with an option to buy	

== Pre-season and friendlies ==
Friendly	v

== Competitions ==
=== Serie A ===
==== League table ====
Pos	Team	Pld	W	D	L	GF	GA	GD	Pts
10	Sampdoria	38	16	6	16	56	60	−4	54
11	Sassuolo	38	11	10	17	29	59	−30	43
12	Genoa	38	11	8	19	33	43	−10	41
13	Chievo	38	10	10	18	36	59	−23	40 (Note: Chievo finished ahead of Udinese on head-to-head points: Chievo 1–1 Udinese, Udinese 1–2 Chievo.)
14	Udinese	38	12	4	22	48	63	−15	40

Source: Serie A, Soccerway
Rules for classification: 1) Points; 2) Head-to-head points; 3) Head-to-head goal difference; 4) Goal difference; 5) Goals scored; 6) Draw.

==== Results summary ====
Overall								Home						Away					
Pld	W	D	L	GF	GA	GD	Pts	W	D	L	GF	GA	GD	W	D	L	GF	GA	GD
38	11	8	19	33	43	−10	41	6	3	10	23	27	−4	5	5	9	10	16	−6

Last updated: 20 May 2018.
Source: Competitive matches

==== Results by round ====
Round	1	2	3	4	5	6	7	8	9	10	11	12	13	14	15	16	17	18	19	20	21	22	23	24	25	26	27	28	29	30	31	32	33	34	35	36	37	38
Ground	A	H	A	H	H	A	H	A	A	H	A	H	A	H	A	H	A	H	A	H	A	H	A	A	H	A	H	H	A	H	A	H	A	H	A	H	A	H
Result	D	L	L	L	D	L	L	W	D	L	L	L	W	D	W	L	D	W	D	W	L	L	W	W	W	L	W	L	L	D	D	W	L	W	L	L	L	L
Position	10	12	16	16	17	18	19	17	14	16	19	18	18	17	15	16	17	15	16	14	15	15	13	13	13	13	13	13	13	13	12	12	12	11	11	11	12	12

Updated to match(es) played on 20 May 2018. Source: Competitive matches
A = Away; H = Home; W = Win; D = Draw; L = Loss

==== Matches ====
20 August 2017 1	Sassuolo	0–0	Genoa	Reggio Emilia
20:45 CEST (UTC+02:00)	Magnanelli (yellow card) 55'; Politano (yellow card) 61'	Report	Veloso (yellow card) 26'; Rossettini (yellow card) 45+1'; Gentiletti (yellow card) 63'	Stadium: Mapei Stadium – Città del Tricolore; Attendance: 8,134; Referee: Antonio Damato

26 August 2017 2	Genoa	2–4	Juventus	Genoa
18:00 CEST (UTC+02:00)	Pjanić 1' (o.g.); Galabinov 7' (pen.); Gentiletti (yellow card) 13'; Biraschi (yellow card) 17'; Lazović (yellow card) 45+3'; Laxalt (yellow card) 78'	Report	Lichtsteiner (yellow card) 8'; Dybala 14', 45+4' (pen.), 90+2'; Pjanić (yellow card) 18'; Cuadrado 62', (yellow card) 64'	Stadium: Stadio Luigi Ferraris; Attendance: 26,296; Referee: Luca Banti

10 September 2017 3	Udinese	1–0	Genoa	Udine
15:00 CEST (UTC+02:00)	Jankto 15'; Behrami (yellow card) 25'; Lasagna (yellow card) 55'; Samir (yellow card) 71'; Pezzella (red card) 79'; Barák (yellow card) 90+2'	Report	Bertolacci (red card) 37'; Taarabt (yellow card) 90+3'	Stadium: Dacia Arena; Attendance: 14,032; Referee: Fabio Maresca

17 September 2017 4	Genoa	2–3	Lazio	Genoa
20:45 CEST (UTC+02:00)	Rosi (yellow card) 39'; Pellegri 57', 73'	Report	Bastos 13'; De Vrij (yellow card) 46'; Immobile 70', 82'; Luis Alberto (yellow card) 87'	Stadium: Stadio Luigi Ferraris; Attendance: 19,065; Referee: Daniele Orsato

20 September 2017 5	Genoa	1–1	Chievo	Genoa
20:45 CEST (UTC+02:00)	Pellegri (yellow card) 41'; Laxalt 62'	Report	Hetemaj (yellow card) 38', (goal) 73'; Tomović (yellow card) 81'	Stadium: Stadio Luigi Ferraris; Attendance: 18,376; Referee: Paolo Mazzoleni

24 September 2017 6	Internazionale	1–0	Genoa	Milan
15:00 CEST (UTC+02:00)	D'Ambrosio 87'	Report	Migliore (yellow card) 84'; Oméonga (red card) 90+1'; Zukanović (yellow card) 90+3'; Taarabt (red card) 90+3'	Stadium: San Siro; Attendance: 50,037; Referee: Marco Guida

30 September 2017 7	Genoa	0–1	Bologna	Genoa
20:45 CEST (UTC+02:00)	Pellegri (yellow card) 6'; Palladino (yellow card) 38'; Rossettini (yellow card) 43'; Veloso (yellow card) 84'	Report	Helander (yellow card) 39'; Krafth (yellow card) 49'; Palacio 73'	Stadium: Stadio Luigi Ferraris; Attendance: 19,154; Referee: Gianluca Rocchi

15 October 2017 8	Cagliari	2–3	Genoa	Cagliari
15:00 CEST (UTC+02:00)	Barella (yellow card) 20'; Pavoletti (yellow card) 33', (goal) 48'; João Pedro 79' (pen.)	Report	Galabinov 8'; Taarabt 35'; Rigoni 75'	Stadium: Sardegna Arena; Attendance: 13,981; Referee: Davide Massa

22 October 2017 9	Milan	0–0	Genoa	Milan
15:00 CEST (UTC+02:00)	Bonucci (red card) 25'	Report	Zukanović (yellow card) 40'; Taarabt (yellow card) 61'	Stadium: San Siro; Attendance: 47,219; Referee: Piero Giacomelli

25 October 2017 10	Genoa	2–3	Napoli	Genoa
20:45 CEST (UTC+02:00)	Taarabt 4'; Zukanović (yellow card) 74'; Izzo 76'	Report	Mertens 14', 30'; Zukanović 60' (o.g.); Rog (yellow card) 86'	Stadium: Stadio Luigi Ferraris; Attendance: 23,367; Referee: Paolo Mazzoleni

29 October 2017 11	SPAL	1–0	Genoa	Ferrara
15:00 CET (UTC+01:00)	Schiattarella (yellow card) 30'; Antenucci 56'; Felipe (yellow card) 59'; Borriello (yellow card) 87'; Schiavon (yellow card) 88'	Report	Pandev (yellow card) 73'; Rossettini (yellow card) 81'; Izzo (yellow card) 85'	Stadium: Stadio Paolo Mazza; Attendance: 12,100; Referee: Daniele Orsato

4 November 2017 12	Genoa	0–2	Sampdoria	Genoa
20:45 CET (UTC+01:00)	Lapadula (yellow card) 27'; Veloso (yellow card) 58'; Rossettini (yellow card) 69'; Taarabt (yellow card) 81'	Report	Bereszyński (yellow card) 23'; Ramírez 24'; Ferrari (yellow card) 44'; Quagliarella 84'	Stadium: Stadio Luigi Ferraris; Attendance: 32,288; Referee: Massimiliano Irrati

19 November 2017 13	Crotone	0–1	Genoa	Crotone
12:30 CET (UTC+01:00)	Stoian (yellow card) 39'	Report	Rigoni 11', (yellow card) 70'; Spolli (yellow card) 33'; Veloso (yellow card) 54'	Stadium: Stadio Ezio Scida; Attendance: 9,106; Referee: Paolo Tagliavento

26 November 2017 14	Genoa	1–1	Roma	Genoa
15:00 CET (UTC+01:00)	Lapadula 70' (pen.); Taarabt (yellow card) 74'	Report	Fazio (yellow card) 44'; Nainggolan (yellow card) 47'; El Shaarawy 59'; De Rossi (red card) 69'; Juan Jesus (yellow card) 71'	Stadium: Stadio Luigi Ferraris; Attendance: 20,949; Referee: Piero Giacomelli

4 December 2017 15	Hellas Verona	0–1	Genoa	Verona
21:00 CET (UTC+01:00)	Souprayen (yellow card) 64'; Büchel (yellow card) 87'	Report	Pandev 45+2'; Oméonga (yellow card) 73'; Spolli (yellow card) 77'; Bertolacci (yellow card) 79'; Lapadula (yellow card) 81'	Stadium: Stadio Marc'Antonio Bentegodi; Attendance: 14,136; Referee: Antonio Damato

12 December 2017 16	Genoa	1–2	Atalanta	Genoa
19:00 CET (UTC+01:00)	Bertolacci 4', (yellow card) 90+6'; Izzo (yellow card) 25'; Pandev (yellow card) 60'	Report	Masiello (yellow card) 11', (goal) 52'; Iličić 45'; De Roon (yellow card) 59'	Stadium: Stadio Luigi Ferraris; Attendance: 18,281; Referee: Daniele Doveri

17 December 2017 17	Fiorentina	0–0	Genoa	Florence
15:00 CET (UTC+01:00)	Théréau (yellow card) 26'; Badelj (yellow card) 82'	Report	Brlek (yellow card) 27'; Rosi (yellow card) 67'	Stadium: Stadio Artemio Franchi; Attendance: 21,043; Referee: Gianpaolo Calvarese

23 December 2017 18	Genoa	1–0	Benevento	Genoa
15:00 CET (UTC+01:00)	Zukanović (yellow card) 45'; Lapadula (yellow card) 62', (goal) 90+2' (pen.)	Report	Lucioni (yellow card) 28'; Del Pinto (yellow card) 44'; Cataldi (yellow card) 83'; Belec (yellow card) 90'; Lombardi (yellow card) 90+3'	Stadium: Stadio Luigi Ferraris; Attendance: 19,465; Referee: Rosario Abisso

30 December 2017 19	Torino	0–0	Genoa	Turin
15:00 CET (UTC+01:00)	Valdifiori (yellow card) 47'	Report	Rosi (yellow card) 38'; Rigoni (yellow card) 67'; Spolli (yellow card) 90+2'	Stadium: Stadio Olimpico Grande Torino; Attendance: 17,039; Referee: Massimiliano Irrati

6 January 2018 20	Genoa	1–0	Sassuolo	Genoa
15:00 CET (UTC+01:00)	Rigoni (yellow card) 29'; Zukanović (yellow card) 70'; Galabinov (yellow card) 77', (goal) 80'	Report	Missiroli (yellow card) 68'	Stadium: Stadio Luigi Ferraris; Attendance: 18,639; Referee: Piero Giacomelli

22 January 2018 21	Juventus	1–0	Genoa	Turin
20:45 CET (UTC+01:00)	Douglas Costa 16'; Alex Sandro (yellow card) 67'	Report	Spolli (yellow card) 25'; Rosi (yellow card) 44'; Pandev (yellow card) 72'; Perin (yellow card) 84'; Galabinov (yellow card) 85'	Stadium: Allianz Stadium; Attendance: 29,069; Referee: Marco Di Bello

28 January 2018 22	Genoa	0–1	Udinese	Genoa
15:00 CET (UTC+01:00)	Bertolacci (yellow card) 13'; Spolli (yellow card) 60'	Report	Behrami 62'; Samir (red card) 65'	Stadium: Stadio Luigi Ferraris; Attendance: 18,896; Referee: Luca Pairetto

5 February 2018 23	Lazio	1–2	Genoa	Rome
20:45 CET (UTC+01:00)	Parolo 59'	Report	Pandev 55'; Laxalt 90+2'; Rossettini (yellow card) 90+4'	Stadium: Stadio Olimpico; Attendance: 30,000; Referee: Fabio Maresca

11 February 2018 24	Chievo	0–1	Genoa	Verona
15:00 CET (UTC+01:00)	Castro (yellow card) 66'	Report	Spolli (yellow card) 14'; Laxalt 90+1'	Stadium: Stadio Marc'Antonio Bentegodi; Attendance: 8,500; Referee: Claudio Gavillucci

17 February 2018 25	Genoa	2–0	Internazionale	Genoa
20:45 CET (UTC+01:00)	Ranocchia 45' (o.g.); Pandev 59'	Report	Ranocchia (yellow card) 27'	Stadium: Stadio Luigi Ferraris; Attendance: 22,629; Referee: Michael Fabbri

24 February 2018 26	Bologna	2–0	Genoa	Bologna
18:00 CET (UTC+01:00)	Di Francesco (yellow card) 28'; Destro 49', (yellow card) 50'; Falletti 72'	Report		Stadium: Stadio Renato Dall'Ara; Attendance: 16,383; Referee: Antonio Giua

11 March 2018 28	Genoa	0–1	Milan	Genoa
15:00 CET (UTC+01:00)	Bertolacci (yellow card) 79'	Report	Silva 90+4'	Stadium: Stadio Luigi Ferraris; Attendance: 20,004; Referee: Michael Fabbri

18 March 2018 29	Napoli	1–0	Genoa	Naples
20:45 CET (UTC+01:00)	Albiol 72'; Zieliński (yellow card) 75'	Report	Laxalt (yellow card) 47'; Rosi (yellow card) 76'	Stadium: Stadio San Paolo; Attendance: 30,059; Referee: Fabrizio Pasqua

31 March 2018 30	Genoa	1–1	SPAL	Genoa
15:00 CEST (UTC+02:00)	Lapadula 30' (pen.); Rigoni (yellow card) 37'; Bertolacci (yellow card) 64'; Lazović (yellow card) 72'; Taarabt (yellow card) 88'	Report	Vicari (red card) 29'; Lazzari 60', (yellow card) 61'; Costa (yellow card) 71'	Stadium: Stadio Luigi Ferraris; Attendance: 19,853; Referee: Piero Giacomelli

3 April 2018 27	Genoa	2–1	Cagliari	Genoa
18:30 CEST (UTC+02:00)	Lapadula 53'; Pereira (yellow card) 83'; Medeiros 90'; Biraschi (yellow card) 90+6'	Report	Sau (yellow card) 41'; Ceppitelli (yellow card) 56'; Andreolli (yellow card) 57'; Barella 62' (pen.); Castán (yellow card) 90+5'	Stadium: Stadio Luigi Ferraris; Attendance: 18,869; Referee: Fabio Maresca
Note: Postponed due to Fiorentina player Davide Astori's death; originally scheduled for 4 March 2018.

7 April 2018 31	Sampdoria	0–0	Genoa	Genoa
20:45 CEST (UTC+02:00)	Bereszyński (yellow card) 45'	Report	Pandev (yellow card) 24'; Rigoni (yellow card) 45'	Stadium: Stadio Luigi Ferraris; Attendance: 30,117; Referee: Davide Massa

14 April 2018 32	Genoa	1–0	Crotone	Genoa
18:00 CEST (UTC+02:00)	Medeiros (yellow card) 12'; Bessa 28'; Pereira (yellow card) 90+2'	Report	Ajeti (yellow card) 45+1'; Trotta (yellow card) 46'; Tumminello (yellow card) 86'; Simy (yellow card) 86'	Stadium: Stadio Luigi Ferraris; Attendance: 18,988; Referee: Massimiliano Irrati

18 April 2018 33	Roma	2–1	Genoa	Rome
20:45 CEST (UTC+02:00)	Ünder 17'; Zukanović 52' (o.g.)	Report	Rossettini (yellow card) 16'; Lapadula 61'	Stadium: Stadio Olimpico; Attendance: 30,095; Referee: Luca Pairetto

23 April 2018 34	Genoa	3–1	Hellas Verona	Genoa
20:45 CEST (UTC+02:00)	Medeiros 7'; Cofie (yellow card) 13'; Hiljemark (yellow card) 64'; Bessa 78'; Pandev 90+3'	Report	Danzi (yellow card) 29'; Valoti (yellow card) 33'; Cerci (yellow card) 57'; Rômulo 64' (pen.)	Stadium: Stadio Luigi Ferraris; Attendance: 18,839; Referee: Claudio Gavillucci

29 April 2018 35	Atalanta	3–1	Genoa	Bergamo
15:00 CEST (UTC+02:00)	Barrow 16'; Cristante 22'; Castagne (yellow card) 42'; Freuler (yellow card) 71'; Iličić 74'; Caldara (yellow card) 80'	Report	Rossettini (yellow card) 9'; Veloso 81'	Stadium: Stadio Atleti Azzurri d'Italia; Attendance: 18,543; Referee: Michael Fabbri

6 May 2018 36	Genoa	2–3	Fiorentina	Genoa
15:00 CEST (UTC+02:00)	Bertolacci (yellow card) 19'; Spolli (yellow card) 53'; Rossi 64'; Lapadula 68'; Pandev (red card) 71'; Zukanović (red card) 83'	Report	Badelj (yellow card) 29'; Benassi 43'; Gaspar (yellow card) 51'; Biraghi (yellow card) 61'; Saponara (yellow card) 63'; Eysseric 77'; Dabo 80', (yellow card) 81'; Chiesa (yellow card) 83'	Stadium: Stadio Luigi Ferraris; Attendance: 20,893; Referee: Gianluca Manganiello
Note: Ervin Zukanović was sent off for dissent while a substitute.

12 May 2018 37	Benevento	1–0	Genoa	Benevento
18:00 CEST (UTC+02:00)	Cataldi (yellow card) 40'; Diabaté 87'	Report	Bertolacci (yellow card) 44'	Stadium: Stadio Ciro Vigorito; Attendance: 13,616; Referee: Daniele Chiffi

19 May 2018 38	Genoa	1–2	Torino	Genoa
20:45 CEST (UTC+02:00)	Oméonga (yellow card) 69'; Pandev 80'	Report	Nkoulou (yellow card) 21'; Falque 30'; Ansaldi (yellow card) 45+2' (yellow-red card) 83'; Baselli 58'	Stadium: Stadio Luigi Ferraris; Attendance: 21,034; Referee: Lorenzo Illuzzi

=== Coppa Italia ===
13 August 2017 Third round	Genoa	2–1 (a.e.t.)	Cesena	Genoa
18:00 CEST (UTC+02:00)	Gentiletti (yellow card) 10'; Simeone 51'; Lazović (yellow card) 60'; Laxalt 95'	Report	Perticone (yellow card) 15'; Laribi 36' (pen.), (yellow card) 56'; Crimi (yellow card) 85'	Stadium: Stadio Luigi Ferraris; Attendance: 8,113; Referee: Gianluca Manganiello

30 November 2017 Fourth round	Genoa	1–0	Crotone	Genoa
21:00 CET (UTC+01:00)	Migliore 54'; Cofie (yellow card) 83'	Report	Simić (yellow card) 16'; Martella (yellow card) 57'; Suljić (yellow card) 66'	Stadium: Stadio Luigi Ferraris; Attendance: 4,149; Referee: Gianluca Manganiello

20 December 2017 Round of 16	Juventus	2–0	Genoa	Turin
20:45 CET (UTC+01:00)	Bentancur (yellow card) 18'; Lichtsteiner (yellow card) 19'; Dybala 42'; Higuaín 76'	Report	Gentiletti (yellow card) 36'; Galabinov (yellow card) 44'; Pellegri (yellow card) 72'; Ricci (yellow card) 90+1'	Stadium: Allianz Stadium; Attendance: 39,969; Referee: Fabio Maresca

== Statistics ==
=== Appearances and goals ===
No.	Pos	Nat	Player	Total		Serie A		Coppa Italia	
No.	Pos	Nat	Player	Apps	Goals	Apps	Goals	Apps	Goals
Goalkeepers
1	GK	(Italy) ITA	Mattia Perin	38	0	37	0	1	0
23	GK	(Italy) ITA	Eugenio Lamanna	3	0	1	0	2	0
38	GK	(Czech Republic) CZE	Lukáš Zima	0	0	0	0	0	0
Defenders
2	DF	(Argentina) ARG	Nicolás Spolli	22	0	20+1	0	1	0
3	DF	(Argentina) ARG	Santiago Gentiletti	7	0	3+1	0	3	0
5	DF	(Italy) ITA	Armando Izzo	16	1	16	1	0	0
13	DF	(Italy) ITA	Luca Rossettini	25	0	22+1	0	2	0
14	DF	(Italy) ITA	Davide Biraschi	26	0	20+3	0	2+1	0
15	DF	(Italy) ITA	Antonio Candela	0	0	0	0	0	0
17	DF	(Morocco) MAR	Jawad El Yamiq	4	0	4	0	0	0
18	DF	(Italy) ITA	Francesco Migliore	7	1	4+2	0	1	1
20	DF	(Italy) ITA	Aleandro Rosi	25	0	22+2	0	1	0
32	DF	(Portugal) POR	Pedro Pereira	6	0	4+2	0	0	0
87	DF	(Bosnia and Herzegovina) BIH	Ervin Zukanović	31	0	31	0	0	0
Midfielders
4	MF	(Ghana) GHA	Isaac Cofie	14	0	6+6	0	2	0
8	MF	(Italy) ITA	Andrea Bertolacci	35	1	34	1	1	0
11	MF	(Morocco) MAR	Adel Taarabt	23	2	18+4	2	0+1	0
24	MF	(Italy) ITA	Daniel Bessa	11	2	6+5	2	0	0
30	MF	(Italy) ITA	Luca Rigoni	24	2	19+4	2	0+1	0
40	MF	(Belgium) BEL	Stéphane Oméonga	21	0	6+13	0	2	0
44	MF	(Portugal) POR	Miguel Veloso	23	1	21+1	1	1	0
45	MF	(Portugal) POR	Iuri Medeiros	11	2	7+4	2	0	0
88	MF	(Sweden) SWE	Oscar Hiljemark	15	0	15	0	0	0
93	MF	(Uruguay) URU	Diego Laxalt	34	4	32	3	2	1
Forwards
10	FW	(Italy) ITA	Gianluca Lapadula	29	6	13+15	6	0+1	0
16	FW	(Bulgaria) BUL	Andrey Galabinov	22	3	13+8	3	1	0
19	FW	(North Macedonia) MKD	Goran Pandev	33	5	22+10	5	1	0
22	FW	(Serbia) SRB	Darko Lazović	24	0	12+9	0	3	0
49	FW	(Italy) ITA	Giuseppe Rossi	10	1	1+8	1	0+1	0
74	FW	(Italy) ITA	Eddie Salcedo	3	0	0+2	0	0+1	0
Players transferred out during the season
9	FW	(Argentina) ARG	Ricardo Centurión	5	0	1+2	0	2	0
9	FW	(Argentina) ARG	Giovanni Simeone	1	1	0	0	1	1
17	FW	(Italy) ITA	Raffaele Palladino	4	0	2+2	0	0	0
21	MF	(Croatia) CRO	Petar Brlek	7	0	3+2	0	2	0
25	MF	(Chile) CHI	Thomas Rodríguez	1	0	0	0	0+1	0
27	FW	(Italy) ITA	Federico Ricci	7	0	2+3	0	1+1	0
64	FW	(Italy) ITA	Pietro Pellegri	7	2	3+3	2	0+1	0
99	MF	(Serbia) SRB	Nikola Ninković	1	0	0	0	1	0

Last updated: 20 May 2018
Source: Competitions

=== Goalscorers ===
Rank	No.	Pos	Nat	Name	Serie A	Coppa Italia	Total
1	10	FW	(Italy)	Gianluca Lapadula	6	0	6
2	19	FW	(North Macedonia)	Goran Pandev	5	0	5
3	93	MF	(Uruguay)	Diego Laxalt	3	1	4
4	16	FW	(Bulgaria)	Andrey Galabinov	3	0	3
5	11	MF	(Morocco)	Adel Taarabt	2	0	2
5	24	MF	(Italy)	Daniel Bessa	2	0	2
5	30	MF	(Italy)	Luca Rigoni	2	0	2
5	45	MF	(Portugal)	Iuri Medeiros	2	0	2
5	64	FW	(Italy)	Pietro Pellegri	2	0	2
10	5	DF	(Italy)	Armando Izzo	1	0	1
10	8	MF	(Italy)	Andrea Bertolacci	1	0	1
10	9	FW	(Argentina)	Giovanni Simeone	0	1	1
10	18	DF	(Italy)	Francesco Migliore	0	1	1
10	44	MF	(Portugal)	Miguel Veloso	1	0	1
10	49	FW	(Italy)	Giuseppe Rossi	1	0	1
Own goal					2	0	2
Totals					33	3	36

Last updated: 20 May 2018

=== Clean sheets ===
Rank	No.	Pos	Nat	Name	Serie A	Coppa Italia	Total
1	1	GK	(Italy)	Mattia Perin	12	0	12
2	23	GK	(Italy)	Eugenio Lamanna	0	1	1
Totals					12	1	13

Last updated: 20 May 2018

=== Disciplinary record ===
No.	Pos	Nat	Name	Serie A			Coppa Italia			Total		
No.	Pos	Nat	Name	Booked	(yellow card) (yellow-red card)	Sent off (straight red)	Booked	(yellow card) (yellow-red card)	Sent off (straight red)	Booked	(yellow card) (yellow-red card)	Sent off (straight red)
1	GK	(Italy)	Mattia Perin	1	0	0	0	0	0	1	0	0
2	DF	(Argentina)	Nicolás Spolli	7	0	0	0	0	0	7	0	0
3	DF	(Argentina)	Santiago Gentiletti	2	0	0	2	0	0	4	0	0
5	DF	(Italy)	Armando Izzo	2	0	0	0	0	0	2	0	0
13	DF	(Italy)	Luca Rossettini	7	0	0	0	0	0	7	0	0
14	DF	(Italy)	Davide Biraschi	2	0	0	0	0	0	2	0	0
18	DF	(Italy)	Francesco Migliore	1	0	0	0	0	0	1	0	0
20	DF	(Italy)	Aleandro Rosi	5	0	0	0	0	0	5	0	0
32	DF	(Portugal)	Pedro Pereira	2	0	0	0	0	0	2	0	0
87	DF	(Bosnia and Herzegovina)	Ervin Zukanović	5	0	1	0	0	0	5	0	1
4	MF	(Ghana)	Isaac Cofie	1	0	0	1	0	0	2	0	0
8	MF	(Italy)	Andrea Bertolacci	7	0	1	0	0	0	7	0	1
11	MF	(Morocco)	Adel Taarabt	5	0	1	0	0	0	5	0	1
21	MF	(Croatia)	Petar Brlek	1	0	0	0	0	0	1	0	0
30	MF	(Italy)	Luca Rigoni	5	0	0	0	0	0	5	0	0
40	MF	(Belgium)	Stéphane Oméonga	2	0	1	0	0	0	2	0	1
44	MF	(Portugal)	Miguel Veloso	4	0	0	0	0	0	4	0	0
45	MF	(Portugal)	Iuri Medeiros	1	0	0	0	0	0	1	0	0
88	MF	(Sweden)	Oscar Hiljemark	1	0	0	0	0	0	1	0	0
93	MF	(Uruguay)	Diego Laxalt	2	0	0	0	0	0	2	0	0
10	FW	(Italy)	Gianluca Lapadula	3	0	0	0	0	0	3	0	0
16	FW	(Bulgaria)	Andrey Galabinov	2	0	0	0	0	0	2	0	0
17	FW	(Italy)	Raffaele Palladino	1	0	0	0	0	0	1	0	0
19	FW	(North Macedonia)	Goran Pandev	4	0	1	0	0	0	4	0	1
22	FW	(Serbia)	Darko Lazović	2	0	0	1	0	0	3	0	0
27	FW	(Italy)	Federico Ricci	0	0	0	1	0	0	1	0	0
64	FW	(Italy)	Pietro Pellegri	2	0	0	1	0	0	3	0	0
Totals				77	0	5	7	0	0	84	0	5

Last updated: 20 May 2018
