= Miguel Veloso =

Portuguese footballer (born 1986)

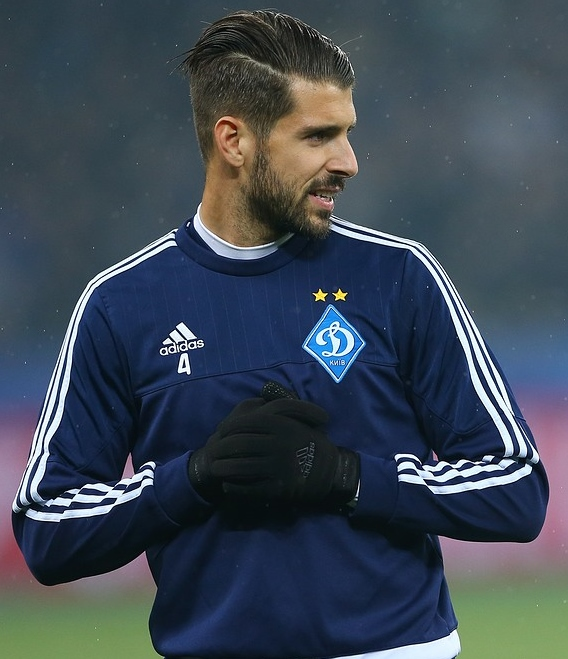
- Veloso with Dynamo Kyiv in 2015

Personal information
- Full name: Miguel Luís Pinto Veloso
- Date of birth: 11 May 1986 (age 40)
- Place of birth: Coimbra, Portugal
- Height: 1.80 m (5 ft 11 in)
- Position: Defensive midfielder

Youth career
- 1994–1999: Benfica
- 1999–2000: CAC Pontinha
- 2000–2005: Sporting CP

Senior career*
Years	Team	Apps	(Gls)
2005–2010	Sporting CP	98	(4)
2005–2006	→ Olivais Moscavide (loan)	28	(7)
2010–2012	Genoa	49	(2)
2012–2016	Dynamo Kyiv	78	(6)
2016–2018	Genoa	45	(1)
2018–2019	Genoa	21	(0)
2019–2023	Hellas Verona	99	(5)
2023–2024	Pisa	27	(1)
Total		445	(26)

International career
2001–2002	Portugal U16	10	(0)
2002–2003	Portugal U17	25	(3)
2004	Portugal U18	5	(1)
2004–2005	Portugal U19	9	(2)
2006	Portugal U20	2	(1)
2006–2008	Portugal U21	18	(5)
2007–2015	Portugal	56	(3)
Medal record
Men's football
Representing Portugal
UEFA European Championship
Bronze medal – third place	2012 Poland-Ukraine
UEFA European U17 Championship
Winner	2003 Portugal
- * Club domestic league appearances and goals

Miguel Luís Pinto Veloso (Portuguese pronunciation: [miˈɣɛl luˈiʃ ˈpĩtu vɨˈlozu]; born 11 May 1986) is a Portuguese former professional footballer. Mainly a defensive midfielder, he could also operate as an attacking left-back.

He started his career with Sporting CP, for whom he appeared in 156 games in all competitions, and spent several years in Italy with Genoa and Hellas Verona, making 214 Serie A appearances. In four years with Dynamo Kyiv in Ukraine, he won as many domestic honours.

A full international since 2007, Veloso earned 56 caps for Portugal, appearing at two World Cups and as many European Championships.

== Club career ==
=== Sporting CP ===
Born in Coimbra, Veloso started his football career at S.L. Benfica, but was rejected for being slightly overweight at the time, entering Lisbon neighbours Sporting CP's youth system at the age of 14. There, he was promoted to the first team for the 2004–05 pre-season, which took place mainly in England; he started out as a central defender.

In order to receive more playing time, Veloso was loaned to C.D. Olivais e Moscavide in the third division, and he helped them to promote to the Segunda Liga with a career-best seven goals. As a result, he was recalled by the Lions — though it appeared difficult for him to grab a place in the starting team, because of the presence of players with much more experience such as Ânderson Polga, Tonel, Marco Caneira or Custódio — and ended up playing 23 Primeira Liga matches during the campaign as his team finished second. He was equally impressive in his debut in the UEFA Champions League, a 1–0 home win against Inter Milan where he stopped Patrick Vieira and Luís Figo from playing effectively, earning Player of the match accolades in the process.

In 2007–08, Veloso was ever-present in Sporting's central midfield alongside fellow youth graduate João Moutinho. The club again lost the league to FC Porto, and the same befell in the following season, with the player being involved in some run-ins with manager Paulo Bento. In the previous off-season and the following January transfer window, he attracted interest from several Premier League sides, but nothing materialised.

Veloso helped Sporting reach the last 16 in the 2009–10 UEFA Europa League, after scoring in both legs of the 4–2 aggregate victory over Everton. They could only, however, finish fourth in the domestic league.

=== Genoa and Dynamo Kyiv ===
On 30 July 2010, Veloso was sold to Genoa CFC in Italy for €9 million, while Alberto Zapater went the other way to Sporting for €2 million. He and compatriot goalkeeper Eduardo debuted in Serie A on 28 August, in a 1–0 win at Udinese Calcio. After a challenging first season at the Stadio Luigi Ferraris, his first goal opened a 2–2 home draw with Atalanta BC on 11 September 2011.

Veloso moved teams and countries again, signing a four-year contract with FC Dynamo Kyiv of the Ukrainian Premier League on 4 July 2012 after impressing at UEFA Euro 2012; the transfer fee was €7 million, while his €5 million annual salary put him second only to Cristiano Ronaldo as the highest-paid Portuguese footballer. He played 127 games in all competitions (14 goals) and won four major titles, including the double in the 2014–15 campaign; in that cup campaign he scored twice in a 4–1 semi-final victory over FC Olimpik Donetsk but he and compatriot Vitorino Antunes missed penalties in a shootout defeat of rivals FC Shakhtar Donetsk.

On 31 July 2016, 30-year-old Veloso returned to Genoa. He left the Rossoblù two years later, but returned shortly after agreeing to a new deal.

=== Hellas Verona ===
Veloso signed a one-year contract with Hellas Verona FC on 20 July 2019. He scored a free kick on his debut on 25 August, equalising in a 1–1 home draw with Bologna FC 1909, and added further goals in a to open a loss at Juventus FC and conclude a draw with Inter Milan, matching his best tally for a top-flight season.

On 29 June 2020, with his first season still ongoing due to the COVID-19 pandemic, Veloso agreed to a deal for a second campaign at the Stadio Marcantonio Bentegodi, in which he added two more goals and renewed again. Serving as captain since the retirement of Giampaolo Pazzini in 2020, he penned a new one-year contract in April 2022.

=== Pisa ===
On 2 August 2023, aged 37, Veloso joined Pisa SC of Serie B on a one-year deal. In September 2024, he announced his retirement; he immediately became assistant manager to newly appointed Filippo Inzaghi at the same club.

== International career ==
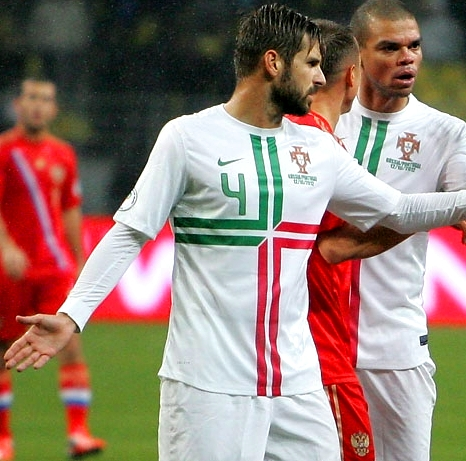
Veloso in action against Russia in 2012

Veloso acted as captain for Portugal at the 2003 UEFA European Under-17 Championship, helping the nation to emerge victorious on home soil after defeating Spain 2–1 in an Iberian final played in Viseu. He was elected the tournament's Golden Player, and subsequently also helped the team reach the quarter-finals in that year's FIFA World Cup held in Finland.

On 14 August 2007, following impressive performances for the under-21s in the 2007 UEFA European Championship in June (the skipper scored twice in three games, albeit in a group stage exit), Veloso was called up to the full side for the first time, for a Euro 2008 qualifier against Armenia, but only made his international debut against Azerbaijan on 13 October. In the finals' group stage, he appeared in the 2–0 loss against Switzerland, a game in which nine out of 11 regular starters were rested.

Veloso was recalled by coach Carlos Queiroz after a long spell out of the squad, for vital 2010 FIFA World Cup qualifying matches with Denmark and Hungary in September 2009, but did not leave the bench on either occasion; he did take the field when they met the latter again the following month, winning 3–0. He netted his first international goal in the same competition, in a 4–0 victory over Malta in Guimarães on 14 October. He was chosen for the finals in South Africa where he made two brief substitute appearances in the group stage, assisting the concluder by Tiago in a 7–0 rout of North Korea.

On 15 November 2011, Veloso scored from a free kick as Portugal defeated Bosnia and Herzegovina 6–2 at the Estádio da Luz in a play-off for a place at Euro 2012. He played every minute of their finals campaign in Poland and Ukraine, before being substituted at half-time in extra time of an eventual penalty shootout loss to Spain in the semi-finals.

At the 2014 FIFA World Cup in Brazil, Veloso was withdrawn at the interval for defender Ricardo Costa in a 4–0 opening defeat to eventual champions Germany. In the final group game against Ghana, he played at left-back due to Fábio Coentrão's injury; a 2–1 win was not enough to beat the United States' goal difference and advance to the last 16.

In September 2015, after one year in the international wilderness, Veloso was picked by manager Fernando Santos for a friendly with France and a Euro 2016 qualifier against Albania. In the second game, on the 7th, he headed home after a 92nd-minute corner kick for the only goal.

== Personal life ==
Veloso's father, António, was also a footballer. A defender, he played several years with Benfica, and was also a longtime Portuguese international.

In 2013, Veloso married the daughter of Genoa club president Enrico Preziosi, Paola. Their son was born in 2016.

== Career statistics ==
=== Club ===
Appearances and goals by club, season and competition
Club	Season	League			Cup		Continental		Other		Total	
Club	Season	Division	Apps	Goals	Apps	Goals	Apps	Goals	Apps	Goals	Apps	Goals
Olivais Moscavide (loan)	2005–06	Segunda Divisão	28	7	0	0	—		—		28	7
Sporting CP	2006–07	Primeira Liga	23	0	6	0	5 (Note: Appearances in UEFA Champions League)	0	—		34	0
Sporting CP	2007–08	Primeira Liga	29	1	9	0	6	0	1 (Note: Appearance in Supertaça Cândido de Oliveira)	0	45	1
Sporting CP	2008–09	Primeira Liga	21	0	3	0	7	1	1	0	32	1
Sporting CP	2009–10	Primeira Liga	25	3	6	5	14 (Note: Four appearances and one goal in UEFA Champions League, ten appearances and three goals in UEFA Europa League)	4	—		45	12
Sporting CP	Total		98	4	24	5	32	5	2	0	156	14
Genoa	2010–11	Serie A	20	0	2	0	—		—		22	0
Genoa	2011–12	Serie A	29	2	2	0	—		—		31	2
Genoa	Total		49	2	4	0	0	0	0	0	53	2
Dynamo Kyiv	2012–13	Ukrainian Premier League	24	2	1	0	12 (Note: Ten appearances and one goal in UEFA Champions League, two appearances in UEFA Europa League)	1	—		37	3
Dynamo Kyiv	2013–14	Ukrainian Premier League	20	1	4	0	8 (Note: Appearances in UEFA Europa League)	1	—		32	2
Dynamo Kyiv	2014–15	Ukrainian Premier League	14	1	5	2	9	3	—		28	6
Dynamo Kyiv	2015–16	Ukrainian Premier League	20	2	4	1	5	0	1 (Note: Appearance in Ukrainian Super Cup)	0	30	3
Dynamo Kyiv	Total		78	6	14	3	34	5	1	0	127	14
Genoa	2016–17	Serie A	23	0	2	1	—		—		25	1
Genoa	2017–18	Serie A	22	1	1	0	—		—		23	1
Genoa	2018–19	Serie A	21	0	1	0	—		—		22	0
Genoa	Total		66	1	4	1	0	0	0	0	70	2
Hellas Verona	2019–20	Serie A	34	3	1	0	—		—		35	3
Hellas Verona	2020–21	Serie A	21	2	1	0	—		—		22	2
Hellas Verona	2021–22	Serie A	22	0	2	0	—		—		24	0
Hellas Verona	2022–23	Serie A	22	0	0	0	—		—		22	0
Hellas Verona	Total		99	5	4	0	0	0	0	0	103	5
Pisa	2023–24	Serie B	27	1	1	0	—		—		28	1
Pisa	Total		27	1	1	0	0	0	0	0	28	1
Career total			445	26	51	9	66	10	3	0	565	45

=== International ===
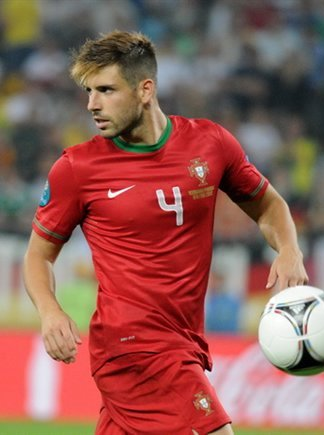
Veloso at Euro 2012

Portugal
Year	Apps	Goals
2007	4	0
2008	3	0
2009	3	1
2010	5	0
2011	6	1
2012	13	0
2013	11	0
2014	8	0
2015	3	1
Total	56	3

Scores and results list Portugal's goal tally first.

List of international goals scored by Miguel Veloso
No.	Date	Venue	Opponent	Score	Result	Competition
1	14 October 2009	Estádio D. Afonso Henriques, Guimarães, Portugal	Malta	3–0	4–0	2010 FIFA World Cup qualification
2	15 November 2011	Estádio da Luz, Lisbon, Portugal	Bosnia and Herzegovina	5–2	6–2	UEFA Euro 2012 qualifying play-offs
3	7 September 2015	Elbasan Arena, Elbasan, Albania	Albania	1–0	1–0	UEFA Euro 2016 qualifying

== Honours ==
Olivais e Moscavide

- Segunda Divisão: 2005–06

Sporting CP

- Taça de Portugal: 2006–07, 2007–08
- Supertaça Cândido de Oliveira: 2007, 2008
- Taça da Liga runner-up: 2007–08, 2008–09

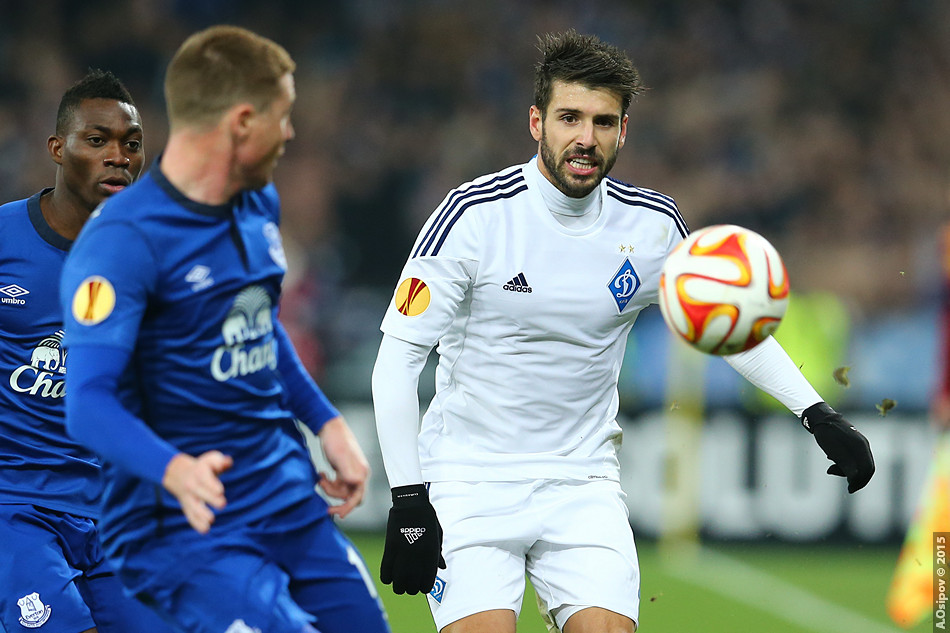
Veloso in action in 2014–15, a season in which Dynamo won the league and cup double

Dynamo Kyiv

- Ukrainian Premier League: 2014–15, 2015–16
- Ukrainian Cup: 2013–14, 2014–15
- Ukrainian Super Cup runner-up: 2014, 2015

Portugal U17

- UEFA European Under-17 Championship: 2003

Individual

- UEFA European Under-17 Championship Golden Player Award: 2003
- Primeira Liga Breakthrough Player of the Year: 2006–07
- UEFA European Under-21 Championship Team of the Tournament: 2007
