= Andrey Galabinov =

Bulgarian footballer (born 1988)

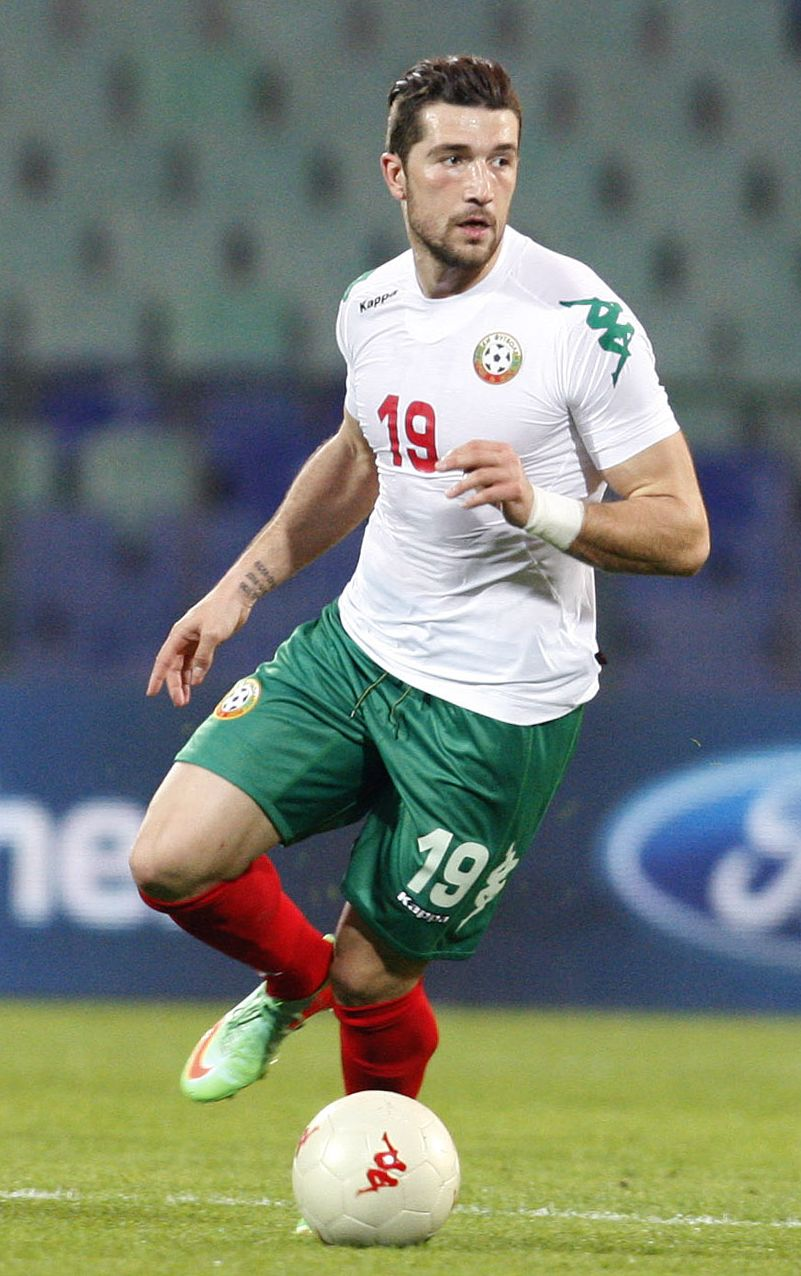
- Galabinov with Bulgaria in 2014

Personal information
- Full name: Andrey Asenov Galabinov
- Date of birth: 27 November 1988 (age 37)
- Place of birth: Sofia, Bulgaria
- Height: 1.92 m (6 ft 4 in)
- Position: Striker

Youth career
- 1998–2004: CSKA Sofia
- 2004–2005: AC Omonia

Senior career*
| Years | Team | Apps | (Gls) |
| 2006–2007 | Castellarano | 18 | (2) |
| 2007–2009 | Bologna | 0 | (0) |
| 2008 | → Giulianova (loan) | 12 | (1) |
| 2009 | → Giacomense (loan) | 12 | (3) |
| 2009–2010 | Lumezzane | 45 | (12) |
| 2011–2015 | Livorno | 32 | (6) |
| 2011 | → Sorrento (loan) | 9 | (1) |
| 2012 | → Bassano (loan) | 15 | (1) |
| 2012–2013 | → Gubbio (loan) | 24 | (12) |
| 2013–2014 | → Avellino (loan) | 39 | (15) |
| 2015–2017 | Novara | 73 | (25) |
| 2017–2018 | Genoa | 20 | (3) |
| 2018–2021 | Spezia | 57 | (16) |
| 2021–2023 | Reggina | 36 | (9) |
| 2024 | Lumezzane | 4 | (0) |
| Total | | 396 | (106) |

International career
| 2014–2021 | Bulgaria | 14 | (2) |
- * Club domestic league appearances and goals

Andrey Asenov Galabinov (Bulgarian: Андрей Асенов Гълъбинов; born 27 November 1988) is a former Bulgarian professional footballer who played as a striker.

After playing youth football for CSKA Sofia and AC Omonia, Galabinov moved to Italy with his parents at the age of 16. He began his career at Serie D club Castellarano, before moving to Bologna in 2007. Bologna then loaned him out to Giulianova and Giacomense. In July 2009 he joined Serie C1 club Lumezzane and remained there until January 2011 when signing for Livorno of Serie B. He had loan spells at Sorrento, Bassano, Gubbio and Avellino before leaving Livorno to join Novara in 2015. In July 2017 he signed with Serie A side Genoa and stayed with the club for a one season.

Galabinov made his senior debut for Bulgaria in March 2014.

== Early life ==
Andrey was born in Sofia to Asen Galabinov and Polina Filipova. His father is a former national volleyball team player and his mother also played the sport. Andrey's maternal grandfather Yordan Filipov formerly played as a goalkeeper for CSKA Sofia and the Bulgarian national team. His paternal grandfather was a volleyball player and coach.

== Club career ==
=== Early career ===
Galabinov began his football career with CSKA Sofia. In 2004, he moved to Cyprus with his family and joined AC Omonia youth academy. A year later, his father had been appointed as a coach of Pallavolo Modena and Andrey moved to Italy. In 2006, he signed with Castellarano.

In July 2007, Galabinov joined Bologna but could not break his way into the first team and went out on loan to Giulianova, and then to Giacomense.

=== Livorno ===
On 1 February 2011, Galabinov signed with Livorno on a four-and-a-half-year deal for an undisclosed fee. He made his Serie B debut on 7 February, in a 1–0 home loss against Vicenza. He appeared in only three league games to the end of the season. In an attempt to earn some playing time, Galabinov spent the 2011–12 season on loan in the Serie C1, where he played for Sorrento and Bassano.

==== Gubbio (loan) ====
In July 2012, Galabinov moved to Gubbio. The move was agreed as a one-year loan deal.

==== Avellino (loan) ====
On 15 July 2013, newly promoted Serie B side Avellino signed Galabinov on a season-long loan deal. He made his debut in a 2–1 home win over Novara on 24 August, playing the full 90 minutes. On 30 September, he scored his first goal, netting a 35th-minute penalty in a 1–0 win over Empoli. On 19 October, Galabinov scored a twice in a resounding 4–1 home victory against Carpi. He continued his goal-scoring form with another brace against Cittadella, ten days later. On 25 January 2014, he netted Avelino's only goal in their 2–1 defeat at Novara, taking his tally of league goals this season to 10. Galabinov made 39 appearances during the 2013–14 season finishing as the club's top scorer with 15 goals.

=== Return to Livorno ===
Galabinov returned to Livorno at the end of the season, scoring eight goals in six pre-season friendly games. On 17 August 2014, he scored his first competitive goal for Livorno in a 4–2 Coppa Italia loss against Bassano Virtus. He then continued his goalscoring form by scoring his first league goal for the club on the opening day of the 2014–15 season in Serie B, a 1–1 draw against Carpi at Stadio Armando Picchi on 30 August. Two months later, on 1 November, Galabinov scored a penalty in a 3–2 home win over Bologna. He left Livorno after his contract expired in summer 2015.

=== Novara ===
On 12 August 2015, Galabinov signed as a free agent with Novara. At first he wore no.35 shirt, but picked no.16 after Nicolas Schiavi switched to no.20. For two seasons he scored 25 goals in 73 Serie B matches.

=== Genoa ===
In summer 2017, Galabinov joined Serie A side Genoa on a free transfer after his contract with Novara had expired. He scored his first goal for the club on 26 August 2017, on the second matchday of the season, converting a penalty for a 2–0 lead in a match that ended in a 2–4 home defeat to Juventus.

=== Spezia ===
On 17 August 2018, Galabinov joined Serie B side Spezia Calcio on a three-year deal. In his second season at Spezia he earned promotion to the Serie A for the first time in club's history, scoring 7 goals in 19 league games.

On 27 September 2020, he scored Spezia's first-ever Serie A goal, in a 4–1 loss against Sassuolo in the 2nd round of the 2020–21 season at the Stadio Dino Manuzzi. On 30 September, he scored a brace in a 2–0 away win against Udinese, to secure Spezia's first victory in Serie A.

=== Reggina ===
On 18 August 2021, Galabinov joined Serie B side Reggina on a permanent transfer, signing a 3-year contract.

=== Return to Lumezzane ===
On 7 March 2024, Galabinov returned to Serie C club Lumezzane on a short-term contract until the end of the season.

== International career ==
On 20 February 2014, Galabinov was called up to the Bulgaria squad, for their friendly fixture against Belarus. He made his debut in the match on 5 March, playing in the first 45 minutes and hitting the woodwork after an individual effort. Galabinov opened his account for the national side on 23 May 2014, scoring the first goal in the 1–1 draw against Canada.

== Personal life ==
Since 2017 Galabinov is dating the Italian model Natasha Cinelli, the sister of his former teammate Antonio Cinelli.

== Career statistics ==
=== Club ===
As of match played 10 August 2023

Appearances and goals by club, season and competition
| Club | Season | League | | | Domestic Cup (Note: Includes Coppa Italia.) | | Europe (Note: Includes UEFA Champions League and UEFA Europa League.) | | Total | |
| Club | Season | Division | Apps | Goals | Apps | Goals | Apps | Goals | Apps | Goals |
|---|---|---|---|---|---|---|---|---|---|---|
| Castellarano | 2006–07 | Serie D | 18 | 2 | — | | — | | 18 | 2 |
| Bologna | 2007–08 | Serie B | 0 | 0 | 0 | 0 | — | | 0 | 0 |
| Giulianova | 2008–09 | Serie C2 | 12 | 1 | 0 | 0 | — | | 12 | 1 |
| Giacomense | 2008–09 | Serie C2 | 12 | 3 | 0 | 0 | — | | 12 | 3 |
| Lumezzane | 2009–10 | Serie C1 | 26 | 8 | 2 | 0 | — | | 28 | 8 |
| Lumezzane | 2010–11 | Serie C1 | 19 | 4 | 2 | 2 | — | | 21 | 6 |
| Lumezzane | Total | | 45 | 12 | 4 | 2 | — | | 49 | 14 |
| Livorno | 2010–11 | Serie B | 3 | 0 | 0 | 0 | — | | 3 | 0 |
| Sorrento | 2011–12 | Serie C1 | 9 | 1 | 0 | 0 | — | | 9 | 1 |
| Bassano Virtus | 2011–12 | Serie C1 | 15 | 1 | 0 | 0 | — | | 15 | 1 |
| Gubbio | 2012–13 | Serie C1 | 24 | 12 | 1 | 2 | — | | 25 | 14 |
| Avellino | 2013–14 | Serie B | 39 | 15 | 4 | 1 | — | | 43 | 16 |
| Livorno | 2014–15 | Serie B | 29 | 6 | 1 | 1 | — | | 30 | 7 |
| Novara | 2015–16 | Serie B | 39 | 13 | 1 | 0 | — | | 40 | 13 |
| Novara | 2016–17 | Serie B | 34 | 12 | 3 | 1 | — | | 37 | 13 |
| Novara | Total | | 73 | 25 | 4 | 1 | — | | 77 | 26 |
| Genoa | 2017–18 | Serie A | 20 | 3 | 1 | 0 | — | | 21 | 3 |
| Spezia | 2018–19 | Serie B | 26 | 6 | 0 | 0 | — | | 26 | 6 |
| Spezia | 2019–20 | Serie B | 19 | 7 | 2 | 0 | — | | 21 | 7 |
| Spezia | 2020–21 | Serie A | 12 | 3 | 2 | 1 | — | | 14 | 4 |
| Spezia | Total | | 57 | 16 | 4 | 1 | — | | 61 | 17 |
| Reggina | 2021–22 | Serie B | 31 | 9 | 0 | 0 | — | | 31 | 9 |
| Reggina | 2022–23 | Serie B | 5 | 0 | 0 | 0 | — | | 5 | 0 |
| Reggina | Total | | 36 | 9 | 0 | 0 | — | | 36 | 9 |
| Career total | | | 385 | 103 | 19 | 8 | 0 | 0 | 403 | 111 |

=== International ===
As of match played on 5 June 2021.

Appearances and goals by national team and year
| National team | Year | Apps | Goals |
|---|---|---|---|
| Bulgaria | 2014 | 6 | 2 |
| Bulgaria | 2017 | 5 | 0 |
| Bulgaria | 2021 | 3 | 0 |
| Total | | 14 | 2 |

Scores and results list Bulgaria's goal tally first, score column indicates score after each Galabinov goal.

List of international goals scored by Andrey Galabinov
| No. | Date | Venue | Opponent | Score | Result | Competition |
|---|---|---|---|---|---|---|
| 1 | 23 May 2014 | Sonnensee-Stadion, Ritzing, Austria | Canada | 1–0 | 1–1 | Friendly |
| 2 | 16 November 2014 | Vasil Levski National Stadium, Sofia, Bulgaria | Malta | 1–0 | 1–1 | UEFA Euro 2016 Qualification |
