= Iuri Medeiros =

Portuguese footballer (born 1994)

Personal information
- Full name: Iuri José Picanço Medeiros
- Date of birth: 10 July 1994 (age 32)
- Place of birth: Horta, Portugal
- Height: 1.75 m (5 ft 9 in)
- Position: Winger

Youth career
- 2004–2005: Sporting Horta
- 2005–2013: Sporting CP

Senior career*
Years	Team	Apps	(Gls)
2012–2017	Sporting CP B	68	(12)
2015	→ Arouca (loan)	17	(3)
2015–2016	→ Moreirense (loan)	29	(8)
2016–2017	→ Boavista (loan)	27	(7)
2017–2019	Sporting CP	6	(0)
2018–2019	→ Genoa (loan)	13	(2)
2019	→ Legia Warsaw (loan)	14	(3)
2019–2021	1. FC Nürnberg	9	(0)
2020–2021	→ Braga (loan)	15	(5)
2021–2023	Braga	54	(17)
2023–2024	Al-Nasr	26	(4)
2025	Hapoel Be'er Sheva	10	(2)
2025–2026	Újpest	14	(2)

International career
2009	Portugal U15	2	(0)
2009–2010	Portugal U16	7	(1)
2010–2011	Portugal U17	12	(3)
2011–2012	Portugal U18	10	(1)
2013	Portugal U19	2	(0)
2014	Portugal U20	4	(0)
2014−2017	Portugal U21	19	(1)
2016	Portugal U23	1	(0)
Medal record
Men's football
Representing Portugal
UEFA European Under-21 Championship
Runner-up	2015 Czech Republic
- * Club domestic league appearances and goals as of 14:25, 20 December 2025 (UTC)

Iuri José Picanço Medeiros (born 10 July 1994) is a Portuguese professional footballer who plays as a winger.

He achieved Primeira Liga figures of 148 games and 40 goals, for Sporting CP and Braga as well as loans to Arouca, Moreirense and Boavista. He also had brief spells in Italy, Poland, Germany, the United Arab Emirates, Israel and Hungary, and won the 2020–21 Taça de Portugal with Braga.

Medeiros earned 56 caps and scored six goals for Portugal's youth teams.

== Club career ==
=== Sporting CP ===
Born in Horta, Azores, Medeiros joined Sporting CP's youth system in 2005, aged 11. He went on to spend three full seasons with their reserves in the Segunda Liga, his debut as a professional arriving of on 11 August 2012 as he came on as a 62nd-minute substitute for Filipe Chaby in a 1−0 away loss against U.D. Oliveirense.

Medeiros was loaned to F.C. Arouca in the 2015 January transfer window, playing his first game in the Primeira Liga on the 18th in a 1−0 defeat at Moreirense FC. He subsequently served two season-long top division loans, at Moreirense and Boavista FC. While at the service of the former, he scored his first goal in the competition on 25 September 2015 to help to a 2−2 home draw with FC Porto and, on 12 March 2017, netted a brace to help the latter defeat C.S. Marítimo 3−0.

Returned to the Estádio José Alvalade for the 2017−18 campaign, Medeiros made his competitive debut for Sporting's first team on 15 August 2017, playing the last minutes of the 0−0 home draw against FC Steaua București in the play-off round of the UEFA Champions League. He was, however, quickly deemed surplus to requirements by manager Jorge Jesus.

On 25 January 2018, Medeiros signed with Genoa CFC on loan until June 2019, with the Italian club having the option to make the move permanent for €10 million. He made his Serie A debut on 5 February, playing 25 minutes in a 2−1 away win over SS Lazio. He scored his first goal for his new team on 3 April in his first start, helping the hosts to defeat Cagliari Calcio 2−1 with a last-minute effort.

On 3 February 2019, Medeiros joined Legia Warsaw on loan. On 19 July, he cut ties with Sporting and moved to 1. FC Nürnberg of the German 2. Bundesliga on a four-year deal.

=== Braga ===
Medeiros returned to Portugal on 28 July 2020, agreeing to a one-year loan at S.C. Braga with an option to buy. He won the Taça de Portugal in his first season, scoring in a 7–0 victory at Clube Olímpico do Montijo in the fourth round on 14 December.

On 29 January 2021, Medeiros suffered a severe left knee sprain in a Taça da Liga match against C.D. Santa Clara, ruling him out for six months. Nonetheless, he was rewarded in April for his six goals and five assists with a five-year contract; the fee was €800,000 and the buyout clause €30 million.

Medeiros scored and set up Ricardo Horta on 24 February 2022 as Braga turned around a deficit against FC Sheriff Tiraspol in the last 32 of the UEFA Europa League. On 14 April, in extra time during the second leg of quarter-final against Rangers, he was sent off for dissent after shouting at referee François Letexier who had booked him for a late challenge on Leon Balogun; as a result, he was not selected by coach Carlos Carvalhal for the next league fixture in order to "reflect upon his actions".

=== Later career ===
On 23 June 2023, Medeiros signed for Al-Nasr SC for a fee of €3 million. He remained abroad the following seasons, with Hapoel Be'er Sheva F.C. in the Israeli Premier League and Újpest FC in the Hungarian Nemzeti Bajnokság I.

== International career ==
Medeiros participated in two UEFA European Under-21 Championship editions with Portugal. In 2015, he collected four substitute appearances for the runners-up.

Medeiros was also selected by coach Rui Jorge for the Portugal Olympic team in a friendly 4–0 win over Mexico on 28 March 2016; the game was held in Angra do Heroísmo on his native archipelago. He was overlooked for the final squad for the tournament in Brazil months later.

== Career statistics ==
As of match played 7 December 2025

Appearances and goals by club, season and competition
Club	Season	League			National cup (Note: Includes Taça de Portugal, Coppa Italia, Polish Cup, DFB-Pokal, UAE President's Cup, Israel State Cup, Magyar Kupa)		League cup (Note: Includes Taça da Liga, UAE League Cup)		Europe		Total	
Club	Season	Division	Apps	Goals	Apps	Goals	Apps	Goals	Apps	Goals	Apps	Goals
Sporting CP B	2012–13	Segunda Liga	10	0	0	0	0	0	0	0	10	0
Sporting CP B	2013–14	Segunda Liga	39	10	0	0	0	0	0	0	39	10
Sporting CP B	2014–15	Segunda Liga	18	2	0	0	0	0	0	0	18	2
Sporting CP B	Total		67	12	0	0	0	0	0	0	67	12
Arouca (loan)	2014–15	Primeira Liga	17	3	0	0	1	0	0	0	18	3
Moreirense (loan)	2015–16	Primeira Liga	29	8	1	1	4	1	0	0	34	10
Boavista (loan)	2016–17	Primeira Liga	27	7	2	1	1	0	0	0	30	8
Sporting CP	2017–18	Primeira Liga	6	0	2	0	2	1	1 (Note: Appearances in UEFA Champions League)	0	11	1
Genoa (loan)	2017–18	Serie A	11	2	0	0	0	0	0	0	11	2
Genoa (loan)	2018–19	Serie A	2	0	1	0	0	0	0	0	3	0
Genoa (loan)	Total		13	2	1	0	0	0	0	0	14	2
Legia Warsaw (loan)	2018–19	Ekstraklasa	14	3	1	0	—		—		15	3
1. FC Nürnberg	2019–20	2. Bundesliga	9	0	2	0	—		—		11	0
Braga (loan)	2020–21	Primeira Liga	15	5	4	1	3	0	6 (Note: Appearances in UEFA Europa League)	0	28	6
Braga	2021–22	Primeira Liga	24	7	2	0	2	1	11	2	39	10
Braga	2022–23	Primeira Liga	30	10	7	0	2	0	4 (Note: Three appearances in UEFA Europa League, one appearance in UEFA Europa Conference League)	0	43	10
Braga	Total		69	22	13	1	7	1	21	2	110	26
Al-Nasr	2023–24	UAE Pro League	26	4	3	1	3	1	—		32	6
Hapoel Be'er Sheva	2024–25	Israeli Premier League	10	2	3	1	0	0	—		13	3
Újpest	2025–26	Nemzeti Bajnokság I	14	2	1	1	—		—		15	3
Career total			301	65	29	6	18	4	22	2	370	77

== Honours ==
Sporting CP

- Taça da Liga: 2017–18

Braga

- Taça de Portugal: 2020–21

Hapoel Be'er Sheva

- Israel State Cup: 2024–25

Portugal

- UEFA European Under-21 Championship runner-up: 2015
