= Davide Biraschi =

Italian professional footballer (born 1994)

Personal information
- Date of birth: 2 July 1994 (age 32)
- Place of birth: Rome, Italy
- Height: 1.82 m (6 ft 0 in)
- Position: Centre-back

Team information
- Current team: Fatih Karagümrük
- Number: 4

Youth career
- Tor de' Cenci
- Urbe Tevere
- –2011: Pomezia
- 2011–2013: Grosseto

Senior career*
Years	Team	Apps	(Gls)
2012–2015	Grosseto	32	(0)
2015–2016	Avellino	33	(0)
2016–2023	Genoa	116	(1)
2022–2023	→ Fatih Karagümrük (loan)	39	(2)
2023–2024	Fatih Karagümrük	30	(0)
2024–2026	Frosinone	21	(0)
2026	→ Fatih Karagümrük (loan)	14	(0)
2026–	Fatih Karagümrük	11	(1)

International career^{‡}
2016–2017	Italy U21	5	(0)
- * Club domestic league appearances and goals as of 19 October 2026 ‡ National team caps and goals as of 27 March 2017

Davide Biraschi (born 2 July 1994) is an Italian professional footballer who plays as a centre-back for Turkish TFF 1. Lig club Fatih Karagümrük.

== Club career ==
On 17 January 2022, Biraschi joined Fatih Karagümrük in Turkey on loan (renews).

On 21 August 2024, Biraschi signed a two-season contract with Frosinone.

On 23 January 2026, Biraschi returned to Fatih Karagümrük once again, on loan.

== Personal life ==
On 2 October 2020, Biraschi tested positive for COVID-19.

== Career statistics ==
=== Club ===
As of match played 18 August 2024

Appearances and goals by club, season and competition
Club	Season	League			National Cup (Note: Includes Coppa Italia, Coppa Italia Serie C, Turkish Cup)		Europe		Other		Total	
Club	Season	Division	Apps	Goals	Apps	Goals	Apps	Goals	Apps	Goals	Apps	Goals
Grosseto	2011–12	Serie B	1	0	0	0	—		—		1	0
Grosseto	2012–13	Serie B	6	0	0	0	—		—		6	0
Grosseto	2013–14	Lega Pro 1	14	0	6	0	—		—		20	0
Grosseto	2014–15	Lega Pro	11	0	1	0	—		—		12	0
Grosseto	Total		32	0	7	0	—		—		39	0
Avellino	2015–16	Serie B	32	0	2	0	—		—		34	0
Avellino	2016–17	Serie B	1	0	1	0	—		—		2	0
Avellino	Total		33	0	3	0	—		—		36	0
Genoa	2016–17	Serie A	7	0	1	0	—		—		8	0
Genoa	2017–18	Serie A	23	0	3	0	—		—		26	0
Genoa	2018–19	Serie A	34	0	2	0	—		—		36	0
Genoa	2019–20	Serie A	24	0	2	0	—		—		26	0
Genoa	2020–21	Serie A	13	0	1	0	—		—		14	0
Genoa	2021–22	Serie A	14	0	2	0	—		—		16	0
Genoa	2023–24	Serie A	1	1	0	0	—		—		1	1
Genoa	Total		116	1	11	0	—		—		127	1
Karagümrük (loan)	2021–22	Süper Lig	14	0	2	0	—		—		16	0
Karagümrük (loan)	2022–23	Süper Lig	29	2	3	0	—		—		32	2
Karagümrük	2023–24	Süper Lig	30	0	3	1	—		—		33	1
Karagümrük	Total		73	2	8	1	—		—		81	3
Career total			254	3	29	1	—		—		283	4
