= Daniel Bessa =

Brazilian football player (born 1993)

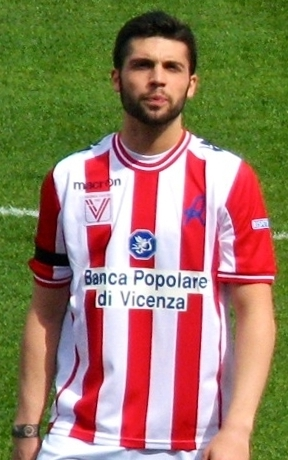
- Bessa lining up for Vicenza in 2013

Personal information
- Full name: Daniel Sartori Bessa
- Date of birth: 14 January 1993 (age 33)
- Place of birth: São Paulo, Brazil
- Height: 1.83 m (6 ft 0 in)
- Position: Midfielder

Team information
- Current team: Al Bataeh
- Number: 11

Youth career
- 2003–2006: Coritiba
- 2007–2008: Atlético Paranaense
- 2008–2012: Internazionale

Senior career*
Years	Team	Apps	(Gls)
2012–2017	Internazionale	0	(0)
2013	→ Vicenza (loan)	3	(0)
2013	→ Olhanense (loan)	1	(0)
2014	→ Sparta Rotterdam (loan)	7	(0)
2014–2015	→ Bologna (loan)	27	(1)
2015–2016	→ Como (loan)	36	(3)
2016–2017	→ Verona (loan)	41	(8)
2017–2022	Verona	59	(2)
2018–2019	→ Genoa (loan)	45	(3)
2020	→ Goiás (loan)	17	(3)
2022–2025	Kalba	69	(15)
2025–	Al Bataeh	1	(0)
- * Club domestic league appearances and goals as of 16:48, 15 March 2024 (UTC)

Daniel Sartori Bessa (born 14 January 1993) is a Brazilian footballer who plays as a midfielder for Emirati club Al Bataeh. He was called up to the Italy national under-18 football team.

== Club career ==
=== Early career ===
Bessa started his career in Brazil with Clube Atlético Paranaense. He also played futsal with Coritiba Futsal in 2004.

=== Internazionale ===
Inter noticed Bessa when he was playing for Atletico Paranaense's youth team and brought him to Italy in 2008.

2012 was his breakthrough year in the Primavera, being a main reason for Inter winning the NextGen Series, scoring three goals in the tournament and having assisted Samuele Longo's goal in the final. Unfortunately, an eye injury made him unavailable for newly appointed first team coach, former primavera coach Andrea Stramaccioni. He was back in time for the Primavera playoffs. He suffered a knee injury in the final versus Lazio which kept him out for the rest of the year. In November 2012, Bessa's contract with Inter was renewed.

==== Vicenza (loan) ====
On 31 January 2013, Bessa was loaned to Vicenza Calcio. He made his Serie B debut for Vicenza on 9 March 2013 in a match against Padova, coming on as a substitute. Having not played regularly for over half a year due to injury, an unfit Bessa didn't get many minutes for a relegation-battling Vicenza side.

==== Olhanense (loan) ====
On 15 July 2013, Bessa, along with fellow Inter player Vid Belec, completed a loan to Sporting Clube Olhanense. He made his Primeira Liga debut on 17 August 2013 against Vitoria de Guimaraes. On 27 November, Olhanense coach Paulo Alves announced that Bessa, who had only managed 13 minutes of playing time all season, wasn't part of his plans.

==== Sparta Rotterdam (loan) ====
On 22 January 2014, Bessa started training with Eerste Divisie team Sparta Rotterdam. After some injury problems he finally made his Eerste Divisie debut on 9 March, coming on as a substitute in the 54th minute against Jong FC Twente.

==== Bologna (loan) ====
On 27 August 2014, Bessa was loaned to Serie B side Bologna. He made his debut as a 74th-minute substitute in the Serie B match against Crotone on 21 September. On 13 December 2014, he scored his first Serie B goal against Frosinone. On 9 June 2015, Bologna were promoted to Serie A, after a 1–1 draw with Pescara in the promotion playoffs. Bessa finished the season with 30 appearances, 1 goal and 3 assists, with 2 being from corners.

==== Como (loan) ====
On 6 August 2015, Bessa was signed by Como.

=== Verona ===
On 12 August 2016, after representing Inter in pre-season, Bessa joined Hellas Verona on a temporary deal, with an obligation to sign him outright. According to Inter and fcinter1908.it, Bessa was sold for €1.2 million transfer fee.

==== Genoa (loan) ====
On 31 January 2018, Bessa was signed by Genoa on loan until 30 June 2019.

=== Kalba ===
On 16 July 2022, Bessa joined Al-Ittihad Kalba in the United Arab Emirates on a two-year contract.

=== Al Bataeh ===
On 23 August 2025, Bessa joined Al Bataeh in the United Arab Emirates on a one-year contract.

== Playing style ==
Bessa is a traditional playmaker, whose playing style closely resembles that of a classic number 10; he has been compared to a both Wesley Sneijder and Xavi. Bessa is a technically gifted player and excels at playing behind the strikers. He has a low center of gravity but also has the strength and ability to shield off defenders and protect the ball. Due to his eye for goal, he often alternates between playing as a central attacking midfielder and as a second striker in a 4–4–1–1 formation, a role which is colloquially known as playing "in the hole", and in which he was deployed in the NextGen series. He has also been used in more advanced positions on occasion, as a centre-forward, and his playing style in this role has occasionally been compared with that of Wayne Rooney.

Bessa also has the ability to play in deeper midfield roles, and move up with the play as he dictates it in midfield with his passing, but is also known to be involved more directly in his team's attacking moves. Although he is not known for his speed, his awareness and vision have been highlighted as his best qualities; he has also been noted for his ball control and dribbling skills.

== Career statistics ==
As of match played 14 March 2024

Appearances and goals by club, season and competition
Club	Season	League			State league (Note: Includes Campeonato Goiano)		National cup (Note: Includes Coppa Italia, Copa do Brasil, UAE President's Cup)		League cup (Note: Includes UAE League Cup)		Continental		Total	
Club	Season	Division	Apps	Goals	Apps	Goals	Apps	Goals	Apps	Goals	Apps	Goals	Apps	Goals
Inter Milan	2012–13	Serie A	0	0	—		0	0	—		0	0	0	0
Vicenza (loan)	2012–13	Serie B	3	0	—		0	0	—		—		3	0
Olhanense (loan)	2013–14	Primeira Liga	1	0	—		0	0	0	0	—		1	0
Sparta (loan)	2013–14	Eerste Divisie	7	0	—		—		—		—		7	0
Bologna (loan)	2014–15	Serie B	27	1	—		—		—		—		27	1
Como (loan)	2015–16	Serie B	36	3	—		0	0	—		—		36	3
Verona (loan)	2016–17	Serie B	41	8	—		1	0	—		—		42	8
Verona	2017–18	Serie A	17	1	—		3	0	—		—		20	1
Genoa (loan)	2017–18	Serie A	11	2	—		0	0	—		—		11	2
Genoa (loan)	2018–19	Serie A	34	1	—		2	0	—		—		36	1
Genoa (loan)	Total		45	3	—		2	0	—		—		47	3
Goiás (loan)	2020	Série A	13	2	4	1	4	2	—		2 (Note: Appearances in Copa Sudamericana)	0	23	5
Verona	2020–21	Serie A	18	0	—		0	0	—		—		18	0
Verona	2021–22	Serie A	24	1	—		1	0	—		—		25	1
Verona	Total		42	1	—		1	0	—		—		43	1
Ittihad Kalba	2022–23	UAE Pro League	25	4	—		2	2	2	0	—		29	6
Ittihad Kalba	2023–24	UAE Pro League	13	5	—		1	2	6	5	—		20	12
Ittihad Kalba	Total		38	9	—		3	4	8	5	—		49	18
Career total			270	28	4	1	14	6	8	5	2	0	298	40

== Honours ==
Inter Primavera

- NextGen series (1): 2011–12
- League Champion (1): 2011–12
