= Stéphane Oméonga =

Belgian footballer (born 1996)

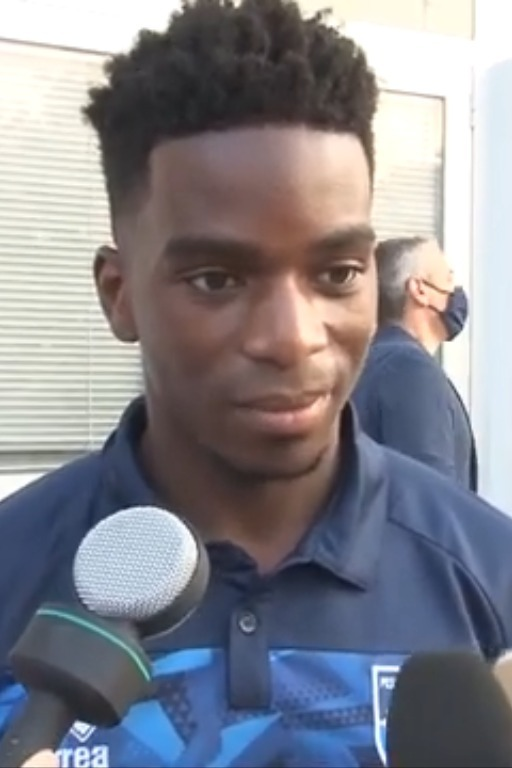
- Oméonga in 2020

Personal information
- Full name: Stéphane Richi Oméonga
- Date of birth: 27 March 1996 (age 30)
- Place of birth: Rocourt, Belgium
- Height: 1.77 m (5 ft 10 in)
- Position: Midfielder

Team information
- Current team: Niki Volos
- Number: 33

Youth career
- 2014–2016: Anderlecht

Senior career*
Years	Team	Apps	(Gls)
2016–2017	Avellino	30	(0)
2017–2020	Genoa	22	(0)
2019	→ Hibernian (loan)	15	(0)
2019–2020	→ Cercle Brugge (loan)	3	(0)
2020	→ Hibernian (loan)	8	(0)
2020–2021	Pescara	24	(0)
2021–2023	Livingston	57	(0)
2023–2025	Bnei Sakhnin	19	(1)
2025–2026	Panserraikos	44	(1)
2026–	Niki Volos	0	(0)

International career^{‡}
2011	Belgium U15	3	(1)
2017–2019	Belgium U21	8	(0)
- * Club domestic league appearances and goals as of 14 June 2026 ‡ National team caps and goals as of 3 October 2019

Stéphane Richi Oméonga (born 27 March 1996) is a Belgian professional footballer who plays as a midfielder for Super League Greece 2 club Niki Volos.

== Career ==
Oméonga signed for Scottish Premiership club Hibernian in January 2019.

On 22 July 2019, he joined Jupiter Pro League club Cercle Brugge on loan, with an option to buy.

He rejoined Hibernian in January 2020. However, following the formal conclusion of the truncated Season 2019/20 in May, Omeonga returned to his parent club once more.

On 5 September 2020, Omeonga departed Serie A club Genoa, ending a three-year stint with the club. Five days later, he became a new Pescara player.

In August 2021, Oméonga joined Scottish Premiership club Livingston on a 2-year deal.

== Personal life ==
Oméonga is of Congolese descent.

== Career statistics ==
=== Club ===
As of 1 June 2023

Appearances and goals by club, season, and competition
Club	Season	League			Domestic cups		Europe		Other		Total	
Club	Season	Division	Apps	Goals	Apps	Goals	Apps	Goals	Apps	Goals	Apps	Goals
Avellino	2016–17	Serie B	30	0	1	0	—		—		31	0
Genoa	2017–18	Serie A	19	0	2	0	—		—		21	0
Genoa	2018–19	Serie A	3	0	1	0	—		—		4	0
Genoa	2019–20	Serie A	0	0	0	0	—		—		0	0
Genoa	Total		22	0	3	0	—		—		25	0
Hibernian (loan)	2018–19	Scottish Premiership	15	0	2	0	0	0	—		17	0
Cercle Brugge (loan)	2019–20	Belgian First Division A	3	0	1	0	—		—		4	0
Hibernian (loan)	2019–20	Scottish Premiership	8	0	2	1	0	0	—		10	1
Pescara	2020–21	Serie B	24	0	2	0	0	0	—		26	0
Livingston	2021–22	Scottish Premiership	27	0	2	0	1	0	0	0	30	0
Livingston	2022–23	Scottish Premiership	30	0	0	0	3	0	0	0	33	0
Livingston	Total		57	0	2	0	4	0	—		63	0
Bnei Sakhnin	2023–24	Israeli Premier League	0	0	0	0	0	0	0	0	0	0
Career total			159	0	12	1	4	0	0	0	176	1
