= Francesco Migliore =

Italian footballer (born 1988)

Personal information
- Full name: Francesco Migliore
- Date of birth: 17 April 1988 (age 38)
- Place of birth: Arezzo, Italy
- Height: 1.73 m (5 ft 8 in)
- Position: Left-back

Youth career
- 2004–2008: Lyon

Senior career*
Years	Team	Apps	(Gls)
2008–2009	Mons	21	(0)
2009–2010	Giulianova	27	(3)
2010–2013	Crotone	72	(1)
2013–2017	Spezia	57	(2)
2017–2018	Genoa	6	(0)
2018–2020	Cremonese	45	(4)
Total		228	(10)
- * Club domestic league appearances and goals

Francesco Migliore (born 17 April 1988) is an Italian former professional footballer who plays as a left back.

== Club career ==
=== Lyon ===
Born in Arezzo, Migliore began his youth career with French champions Olympique Lyonnais. He primarily played in Lyon's CFA.

=== Mons ===
Following the 2007–08 season, he went on trial with Mons and was eventually signed.

=== Cremonese ===
On 5 July 2018, he joined Serie B club Cremonese on a two-year contract.
