= Mattia Perin =

Italian footballer (born 1992)

- Perin in 2026 with Palermo

Personal information
- Full name: Mattia Perin
- Date of birth: 10 November 1992 (age 33)
- Place of birth: Latina, Italy
- Height: 1.88 m (6 ft 2 in)
- Position: Goalkeeper

Team information
- Current team: Palermo
- Number: 1

Youth career
- 2006–2008: Pistoiese
- 2008–2010: Genoa

Senior career*
Years	Team	Apps	(Gls)
2010–2018	Genoa	148	(0)
2011–2012	→ Padova (loan)	25	(0)
2012–2013	→ Pescara (loan)	29	(0)
2018–2026	Juventus	43	(0)
2019–2021	→ Genoa (loan)	53	(0)
2026–	Palermo	1	(0)

International career^{‡}
2009	Italy U17	12	(0)
2009	Italy U18	4	(0)
2009–2010	Italy U19	6	(0)
2011–2012	Italy U20	2	(0)
2010–2012	Italy U21	3	(0)
2014–2018	Italy	2	(0)
- * Club domestic league appearances and goals as of 30 August 2026 ‡ National team caps and goals as of 4 June 2018

Mattia Perin (Italian pronunciation: [matˈtiːa peˈrin]; born 10 November 1992) is an Italian professional footballer who plays as a goalkeeper for Serie B club Palermo.

Perin began his career with Genoa in 2010, and, aside from two season-long loan spells with Padova in 2011–12, and Pescara in 2012–13, he then remained there until the summer of 2018, during which he was sold to Juventus. He won the league title with the club during the 2018–19 season, although he primarily served as a back-up. At international level, he was an unused member of the Italy national team that took part at the 2014 FIFA World Cup, and made his senior debut later that year.

== Club career ==
=== Genoa ===
Born in Latina and a product of the Genoa youth system, Perin was promoted to first team squad in January 2010, as a third-choice goalkeeper, and received the 88 jersey. He made his professional and Serie A debut on 22 May 2011, playing as a starter in the 3–2 home victory against Cesena.

In July 2011, Perin moved to Serie B club Padova on loan. He made his Serie B debut on 1 October, playing as a starter in the away match in a 4–2 victory against Empoli. On 8 January 2017, Perin suffered anterior cruciate ligament in his right knee in a 1–0 home defeat against Roma, ruling him out for the remainder of the 2016–17 season.

=== Juventus ===
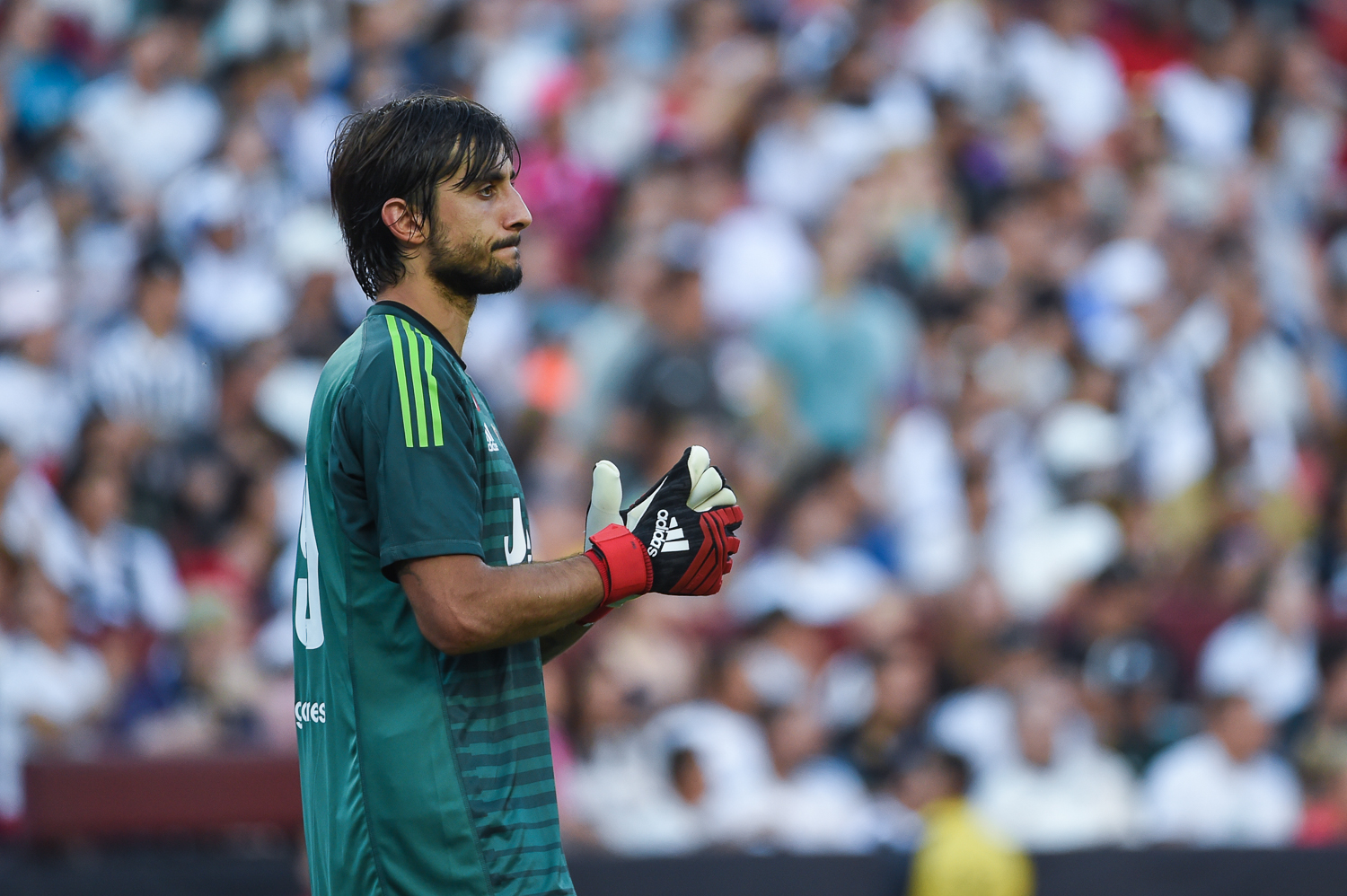
Perin with Juventus in the 2018–19 preseason

On 8 June 2018, Perin signed for Juventus on a four-year contract for a fee of €12 million plus €3 million in bonuses. Following the departure of Gianluigi Buffon, he was initially expected to compete with Wojciech Szczęsny for a starting spot. Perin made his Juventus debut on 26 September 2018, keeping a clean sheet in a 2–0 home win over Bologna. On 1 April 2019, he injured his right shoulder. Perin only made a total of nine competitive appearances for the club throughout the season, all of which came in Serie A, as Juventus finished the season as league champions.

In July 2019, Perin was linked with a move to Portuguese club Benfica. However, he failed his medical due to a shoulder injury, cancelling the transfer. Due to the return of Buffon as a back-up to Szczęsny, Perin was relegated to the role of the club's fourth goalkeeper, behind Carlo Pinsoglio. As a result, in September, he was subsequently excluded from Juventus's 22–player Champions League squad by manager Maurizio Sarri.

On 2 January 2020, Perin rejoined Genoa on loan until the end of the 2019–20 season. He made his first appearance since his return three days later, in a 2–1 home win over Sassuolo in Serie A. On 5 September 2020, he rejoined Genoa on loan until the end of the 2020–21 season.

In the summer of 2021, Perin returned to Juventus as a back-up to Szczęsny. He made his debut from his return on 26 September, in a 3–2 victory against Sampdoria in Serie A. On 8 December, he made his UEFA Club Competition and UEFA Champions League debut in a 1–0 home victory against Malmö in Juventus' final first round match of the latter competition, which saw them top their group. In January 2022, he started in Juventus's 2–1 defeat to Inter in the 2021 Supercoppa Italiana. On 14 April 2022, Juventus announced his contract had been extended until 2025.

On 15 May 2024, Perin started in Juventus' 1–0 victory against Atalanta in the 2024 Coppa Italia final, keeping a clean-sheet.

=== Palermo ===
On 26 August 2026, Perin moved to Palermo on a multi-year contract.

== International career ==
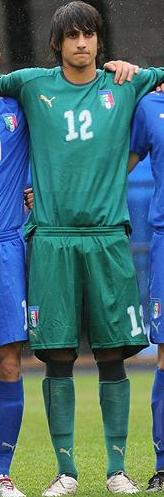
Perin lining up for Italy U19 in 2010

Perin received his first call-up for the Italian senior team by head coach Cesare Prandelli, for the friendly match against England on 15 August 2012 in Bern. He was included in Prandelli's provisional 30-man squad ahead of 2014 FIFA World Cup in Brazil, and then confirmed in the 23-man squad as the third-choice goalkeeper behind Gianluigi Buffon and Salvatore Sirigu. Perin became the youngest player of the squad and the only one who had no previous caps.

Perin made his debut with the national team on 18 November 2014, in a 1–0 victory against Albania, replacing Sirigu for the last 17 minutes at his club ground of the Stadio Luigi Ferraris. On 9 April 2016, he suffered an injury with Genoa in which he tore his anterior cruciate ligament and damaged his meniscus in his right knee, leading him to be excluded from Italy's squad at the UEFA Euro 2016. On 4 June 2018, Perin made his first start in his second appearance, a 1–1 friendly draw against the Netherlands in Turin.

== Style of play ==
Once considered one of the most promising young Italian players of his generation in his position in his youth, in his prime, Perin was an agile, athletic, and dynamic keeper, who was highly regarded for his excellent reactions, shot-stopping ability, positional sense, bravery, and consistency; possessing good goalkeeping technique, he was gifted with strong all-round fundamental goalkeeping skills, and was also known for his speed to get to ground and ability to come off his line to collect the ball. Standing at 1.88 m (6 ft 2 in), although he was not the tallest shot-stopper, he was gifted with an excellent spring, a large frame, and a long reach, which aided him in commanding his area, claiming or punching out crosses, and also enabled him to produce spectacular, acrobatic, diving saves. Due to his attributes, movements, and playing style, he was compared to Walter Zenga in his youth, and was initially considered to be a potential successor to former Italy and Juventus goalkeeper Gianluigi Buffon in the media. Despite his talent, however, he has struggled with injuries throughout his career, which limited his playing time, and affected the overall level and consistency of his performances.

== Controversy ==
Perin had several run-ins with fans of Frosinone, the local rivals of his hometown of Latina. In May 2016, during an argument with a fan of the latter team on Instagram, he wrote "your grandfather speaks Arabic" in reference to the Marocchinate atrocities in the region in 1944. The insult was condemned in the Italian Senate by the city's senator Maria Spilabotte. In September 2018, Juventus manager Massimiliano Allegri benched Perin for the club's away match against Frosinone.

== Career statistics ==
=== Club ===
As of match played 30 August 2026

Appearances and goals by club, season and competition
Club	Season	League			Coppa Italia		Europe		Other		Total	
Club	Season	Division	Apps	Goals	Apps	Goals	Apps	Goals	Apps	Goals	Apps	Goals
Genoa	2010–11	Serie A	1	0	0	0	—		—		1	0
Genoa	2013–14	Serie A	37	0	1	0	—		—		38	0
Genoa	2014–15	Serie A	32	0	1	0	—		—		33	0
Genoa	2015–16	Serie A	25	0	0	0	—		—		25	0
Genoa	2016–17	Serie A	16	0	0	0	—		—		15	0
Genoa	2017–18	Serie A	37	0	1	0	—		—		38	0
Genoa	Total		148	0	3	0	—		—		151	0
Padova (loan)	2011–12	Serie B	25	0	0	0	—		—		25	0
Pescara (loan)	2012–13	Serie A	29	0	1	0	—		—		30	0
Juventus	2018–19	Serie A	9	0	0	0	0	0	0	0	9	0
Juventus	2021–22	Serie A	5	0	5	0	1 (Note: Appearance(s) in UEFA Champions League)	0	1 (Note: Appearance in Supercoppa Italiana)	0	12	0
Juventus	2022–23	Serie A	11	0	4	0	3 (Note: Two appearances in UEFA Champions League, one appearance in UEFA Europa League)	0	–		18	0
Juventus	2023–24	Serie A	3	0	5	0	—		—		8	0
Juventus	2024–25	Serie A	5	0	1	0	3	0	0	0	9	0
Juventus	2025–26	Serie A	9	0	1	0	4	0	—		14	0
Juventus	2026–27	Serie A	1	0	—		—		—		1	0
Juventus	Total		43	0	16	0	11	0	1	0	71	0
Genoa (loan)	2019–20	Serie A	21	0	0	0	—		—		21	0
Genoa (loan)	2020–21	Serie A	32	0	0	0	—		—		32	0
Genoa (loan)	Total		53	0	0	0	—		—		53	0
Palermo	2026–27	Serie B	1	0	0	0	—		—		1	0
Career total			299	0	20	0	11	0	1	0	331	0

=== International ===
As of match played 4 June 2018

National team	Year	Apps	Goals
Italy	2014	1	0
Italy	2018	1	0
Total		2	0

== Honours ==
Juventus

- Serie A: 2018–19
- Coppa Italia: 2023–24
- Supercoppa Italiana: 2018

Individual

- UEFA European Under-17 Championship Team of the tournament: 2009
