= Luca Rossettini =

Italian footballer

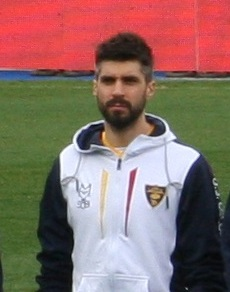

Personal information
- Date of birth: 9 May 1985 (age 41)
- Place of birth: Padua, Italy
- Height: 1.87 m (6 ft 2 in)
- Positions: Right-back; centre-back

Youth career
- Padova

Senior career*
Years	Team	Apps	(Gls)
2004–2007	Padova	44	(3)
2007–2012	Siena	108	(1)
2012–2015	Cagliari	95	(3)
2015–2016	Bologna	29	(3)
2016–2017	Torino	30	(1)
2017–2019	Genoa	23	(0)
2018–2019	→ Chievo (loan)	21	(0)
2019–2021	Lecce	28	(0)
2021	Padova	18	(0)

International career
2005	Italy U20	1	(0)
2008	Italy U23	1	(0)
2014	Italy	0	(0)

Managerial career
- 2021–2022: Padova U17
- 2022–2025: Padova U19
- 2025–2026: AS Roma Women
- * Club domestic league appearances and goals

Luca Rossettini (born 9 May 1985) is an Italian professional football coach and a former player who played as a centre-back.

== Club career ==
=== Padova ===
Rossettini spent his youth years at hometown club Padova.

=== Siena ===
Rossettini joined Siena in a co-ownership deal on 28 August 2007 for €1.2 million. The deal was made permanent when Siena bought out the contract from Padova in June 2008 for another €1.2 million.

=== Cagliari ===
On 21 June 2012, he was signed by Cagliari for €1.6 million.

=== Bologna ===
On 23 June 2015, Rossettini was sold to Bologna for €2.5 million transfer fee.

=== Torino ===
On 16 August 2016, Rossettini was sold to Torino F.C.

=== Genoa ===
On 18 August 2017, he was sold to Genoa.

=== Chievo Verona ===
On 8 August 2018, Rossettini joined to Chievo Verona on loan until 30 June 2019 with an option to buy.

=== Lecce ===
On 12 July 2019 he was signed by Lecce.

=== Return to Padova and retirement ===
On 12 January 2021 he returned to his first club Padova. On 11 August 2021 he announced his retirement as a player, and was appointed as a U-17 Padova team manager.

== International career ==
In November 2014, Rossettini received his first national team call-up. He was capped once for Italy's Olympic team against the Netherlands Olympic team in February 2008 in a friendly match.

== Coaching career ==
After retire, he was coaching Padova's U-17 and Primavera teams from 2021 to 2025. In July 4 of 2025, he became the coach of AS Roma Women and in his first season, won the 2025-26 Serie A Women title.

== Honours ==
- Serie A
  - Winners (1): 2025–26

== Career statistics ==
Club	Season	League			National Cup		Continental		Other		Total	
Club	Season	Division	Apps	Goals	Apps	Goals	Apps	Goals	Apps	Goals	Apps	Goals
Padova	2004–05	Serie C	7	0	0	0	—		—		7	0
Padova	2005–06	Serie C	14	2	1	0	—		—		15	2
Padova	2006–07	Serie C	23	1	0	0	—		—		23	1
Padova	Total		44	3	1	0	0	0	0	0	45	3
Siena	2007–08	Serie A	25	0	1	0	—		—		25	0
Siena	2008–09	Serie A	17	0	1	0	—		—		18	0
Siena	2009–10	Serie A	2	0	0	0	—		—		2	0
Siena	2010–11	Serie B	33	0	2	0	—		—		35	0
Siena	2011–12	Serie A	31	1	2	0	—		—		33	1
Siena	Total		108	1	6	0	0	0	0	0	114	1
Cagliari	2012–13	Serie A	28	0	3	0	—		—		31	0
Cagliari	2013–14	Serie A	36	0	1	0	—		—		37	0
Cagliari	2014–15	Serie A	32	3	2	0	—		—		34	3
Cagliari	Total		96	3	6	0	0	0	0	0	102	3
Bologna	2015–16	Serie A	29	3	1	0	—		—		30	3
Torino	2016–17	Serie A	30	1	1	0	—		—		31	1
Genoa	2017–18	Serie A	23	0	2	0	—		—		25	0
Chievo (loan)	2018–19	Serie A	21	0	2	0	—		—		23	0
Lecce	2019–20	Serie A	26	0	1	0	—		—		27	0
Lecce	2020–21	Serie B	0	0	2	0	—		—		2	0
Lecce	Total		26	0	3	0	0	0	0	0	29	0
Genoa	2020–21	Serie C	19	0	0	0	—		—		19	0
Career total			396	11	22	0	0	0	0	0	418	11
