= Nicolás Spolli =

Argentine footballer

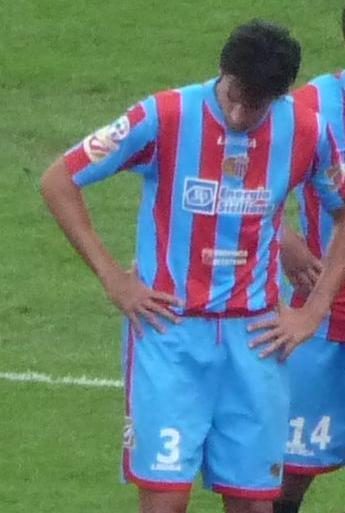
- Spolli playing for Catania in September 2009

Personal information
- Full name: Nicolás Federico Spolli
- Date of birth: February 20, 1983 (age 43)
- Place of birth: Coronel Bogado, Rosario, Argentina
- Height: 1.93 m (6 ft 4 in)
- Position: Centre back

Youth career
- –2005: Newell's Old Boys

Senior career*
Years	Team	Apps	(Gls)
2005–2009	Newell's Old Boys	107	(9)
2009–2015	Catania	148	(6)
2015	→ Roma (loan)	1	(0)
2015–2016	Carpi	4	(0)
2016–2017	Chievo	31	(0)
2017–2019	Genoa	28	(0)
2019	→ Crotone (loan)	12	(0)
2019–2020	Crotone	7	(0)
- * Club domestic league appearances and goals as of 10:08, 21 August 2020 (UTC)

Nicolás Federico Spolli (Spanish pronunciation: [esˈpoli], Italian: [ˈspɔlli]; born 20 February 1983) is a retired Argentine professional footballer who played as a defender.

== Club career ==
=== Newell's Old Boys ===
Born in Rosario, Spolli began his youth career with hometown club, Newell's Old Boys. In 2005, he was promoted to the senior squad. At the club he was soon a regular in the starting eleven, and by 2009, he made over 100 appearances and also hit the back of the net nearly ten times. He was a fan favourite as well.

=== Calcio Catania ===
In July 2009, Calcio Catania sporting director, Pietro Lo Monaco confirmed that the Sicilian club were deep into negotiations with Newell's for the defender and on 25 July 2009, the deal was finalized and Spolli officially became a Catania player. He was Catania's ninth transfer of the 2009 summer transfer window, and proved himself as an integral part of Catania's starting eleven, early in his Serie A career. The player made 26 Serie A appearances in his first season, netting one goal, helping Catania to an impressive 12th-place finish in the Serie A and also a record points total for the club in a top flight season. In his next two seasons with the club, Spolli and his team continued their recent success and endured three additional seasons of record point totals in Serie A, making it five consecutive seasons of this achievement.

Spolli is currently part of a record-breaking Catania outfit that picked up 56 points from 38 Serie A matches. This performance saw the club also break its record number of home victories in a single season, its record number of victories overall in a single top flight campaign, as well as its record points total in Serie A for the fifth consecutive season.

On 17 January 2019, Spolli joined to Crotone on loan with an obligation to buy.

== Career statistics ==
As of match played 31 July 2020

Appearances and goals by club, season and competition
Club	Season	League			National Cup		Continental		Other		Total	
Club	Season	Division	Apps	Goals	Apps	Goals	Apps	Goals	Apps	Goals	Apps	Goals
Newell's Old Boys	2005–06	Primera División	31	3	0	0	—		—		31	3
Newell's Old Boys	2006–07	Primera División	24	2	0	0	—		—		24	2
Newell's Old Boys	2007–08	Primera División	19	2	0	0	—		—		19	2
Newell's Old Boys	2008–09	Primera División	18	0	0	0	—		—		18	0
Newell's Old Boys	Total		92	7	0	0	0	0	0	0	92	7
Catania	2009–10	Serie A	26	1	1	0	—		—		27	1
Catania	2010–11	Serie A	25	0	2	1	—		—		27	1
Catania	2011–12	Serie A	31	2	2	0	—		—		33	2
Catania	2012–13	Serie A	29	2	0	0	—		—		29	2
Catania	2013–14	Serie A	21	1	0	0	—		—		21	1
Catania	2014–15	Serie B	16	0	1	0	—		—		17	0
Catania	Total		148	6	6	1	0	0	0	0	154	7
Roma (loan)	2014–15	Serie A	1	0	0	0	0	0	—		1	0
Carpi	2015–16	Serie A	4	0	1	0	—		—		5	0
Chievo	2015–16	Serie A	10	0	0	0	—		—		10	0
Chievo	2016–17	Serie A	21	0	2	0	—		—		23	0
Chievo	Total		31	0	2	0	0	0	0	0	33	0
Genoa	2017–18	Serie A	21	0	1	0	—		—		22	0
Genoa	2018–19	Serie A	7	0	1	0	—		—		8	0
Genoa	Total		28	0	2	0	0	0	0	0	30	0
Crotone	2018–19	Serie B	12	0	0	0	—		—		12	0
Crotone	2019–20	Serie B	7	0	1	0	—		—		8	0
Crotone	Total		19	0	1	0	0	0	0	0	20	0
Career total			323	13	12	1	0	0	0	0	335	14
