= List of Italian football transfers winter 2023–24 =

The 2023–24 Italian football winter transfer window ran from 2 January to 1 February 2024 (20:00). This list includes transfers featuring at least one club from either Serie A or Serie B that were completed after the end of the summer 2023 window and before the end of the winter 2023–24 window on 1 February. Some contracts were already signed and announced before the window opening.

== Transfers ==
All players and clubs without a flag are Italian.

Legend

- Those clubs in Italic indicate that the player already left the team on loan on this season or a new signing that immediately left the club.

| Date | Name | Moving from | Moving to | Fee |
|---|---|---|---|---|
| 27 December 2023 | (North Macedonia) Eljif Elmas | Napoli | (Germany) RB Leipzig | Undisclosed |
| 29 December 2023 | Andrea Bertolacci | Cremonese | (Turkey) Karagümrük | Loan |
| 30 December 2023 | (Sweden) Albin Ekdal | Spezia | (Sweden) Djurgården | Free |
| 2 January 2024 | (Sweden) Isak Hien | Hellas Verona | Atalanta | Undisclosed |
| 2 January 2024 | (Switzerland) Silvan Hefti | Genoa | (France) Montpellier | Loan |
| 2 January 2024 | (France) Farès Ghedjemis | (France) Rouen | Frosinone | Undisclosed |
| 2 January 2024 | Mattia Tordini | Lecco | Padova | Loan |
| 2 January 2024 | Francesco Bombagi | Catanzaro | Mantova | Undisclosed |
| 2 January 2024 | (Argentina) Tobías Reinhart | (Argentina) |Temperley | Reggiana | Free |
| 3 January 2024 | (Croatia) Karlo Lulić | Frosinone | Bari | Undisclosed |
| 3 January 2024 | Michele Avella | Frosinone | Brescia | Loan |
| 4 January 2024 | Doudou Mangni | Lecco | Alessandria | Loan |
| 4 January 2024 | Nicola Mosti | Modena | Juve Stabia | Loan |
| 4 January 2024 | Loris Bacchetti | Feralpisalò | Casertana | Undisclosed |
| 4 January 2024 | (Ghana) Nana Welbeck | Catanzaro | Catania | Undisclosed |
| 4 January 2024 | (Romania) Eduard Duțu | Fiorentina | Virtus Francavilla | Loan |
| 5 January 2024 | Pasquale Mazzocchi | Salernitana | Napoli | Undisclosed |
| 5 January 2024 | (Canada) Tajon Buchanan | (Belgium) Club Brugge | Internazionale | Undisclosed |
| 5 January 2024 | (Finland) Henri Salomaa | Lecce | Lecco | Loan |
| 5 January 2024 | Eyob Zambataro | Lecco | Torres | Loan |
| 5 January 2024 | Emanuele Cicerelli | Lazio | Catania | Undisclosed |
| 5 January 2024 | Alessandro Vimercati | Juve Stabia | Südtirol | Undisclosed |
| 5 January 2024 | Alessandro Vimercati | Südtirol | Renate | Loan |
| 5 January 2024 | Luca Valzania | Cremonese | Ascoli | Loan |
| 6 January 2024 | (Netherlands) Dean Huijsen | Juventus | Roma | Loan |
| 6 January 2024 | (Argentina) Lautaro Giannetti | (Argentina) Vélez Sarsfield | Udinese | Free |
| 6 January 2024 | (Slovenia) Jasmin Kurtić | (Romania) Universitatea Craiova | Südtirol | Undisclosed |
| 6 January 2024 | Alessandro Celli | Ternana | Catania | Undisclosed |
| 6 January 2024 | (Slovenia) Lovro Štubljar | Empoli | (Slovenia) Domžale | Loan |
| 8 January 2024 | Kevin Bonifazi | Bologna | Frosinone | Loan |
| 8 January 2024 | Filippo Terracciano | Verona | Milan | Undisclosed |
| 8 January 2024 | Filippo Scaglia | Como | Südtirol | Undisclosed |
| 8 January 2024 | Giacomo Faticanti | Lecce | Ternana | Undisclosed |
| 8 January 2024 | Riccardo Baroni | Modena | AlbinoLeffe | Undisclosed |
| 8 January 2024 | (Montenegro) Matteo Ahmetaj | Bari | Recanatese | Loan |
| 9 January 2024 | (Uruguay) César Falletti | Ternana | Cremonese | Undisclosed |
| 9 January 2024 | (Argentina) Franco Carboni | Internazionale | Ternana | Undisclosed |
| 9 January 2024 | Niccolò Corrado | Ternana | Modena | Loan |
| 9 January 2024 | (France) Ange N'Guessan | Torino | Ternana | Loan |
| 9 January 2024 | Luca Vignali | Como | Spezia | Loan |
| 9 January 2024 | (Poland) Szymon Żurkowski | Spezia | Empoli | Loan |
| 9 January 2024 | (Albania) Cristian Shiba | Südtirol | Recanatese | Loan |
| 10 January 2024 | (France) Corentin Louakima | Roma | Lecco | Undisclosed |
| 10 January 2024 | Michele Camporese | Feralpisalò | Cosenza | Loan |
| 10 January 2024 | (Sierra Leone) Yayah Kallon | Verona | Bari | Loan |
| 10 January 2024 | (France) Lucien Agoumé | Internazionale | (Spain) Sevilla | Loan |
| 10 January 2024 | Eddie Salcedo | Internazionale | Lecco | Loan |
| 10 January 2024 | Daniel Maldini | Milan | Monza | Loan |
| 10 January 2024 | Giuseppe Cuomo | Südtirol | Vicenza | Loan |
| 11 January 2024 | (Romania) Radu Drăgușin | Genoa | (England) Tottenham Hotspur | Undisclosed |
| 11 January 2024 | (England) Djed Spence | (England) Tottenham Hotspur | Genoa | Loan |
| 11 January 2024 | (Poland) Jan Żuberek | Internazionale | Ternana | Loan |
| 11 January 2024 | Niccolò Pierozzi | Fiorentina | Salernitana | Loan |
| 11 January 2024 | Raffaele Celia | SPAL | Ascoli | Undisclosed |
| 11 January 2024 | Vincenzo Millico | Ascoli | Foggia | Undisclosed |
| 11 January 2024 | Gianluca Frabotta | Juventus | Cosenza | Loan |
| 11 January 2024 | Christian Travaglini | Sampdoria | Taranto | Loan |
| 11 January 2024 | Daniele Montevago | Sampdoria | Virtus Entella | Loan |
| 11 January 2024 | Mattia Vitale | Sampdoria | Monopoli | Loan |
| 11 January 2024 | Ludovico Gelmi | Atalanta | Monopoli | Loan |
| 12 January 2024 | (Argentina) Facundo Zabala | Venezia | (Paraguay) Club Olimpia | Undisclosed |
| 12 January 2024 | (Iceland) Jakob Pálsson | Venezia | (Iceland) Valur | Undisclosed |
| 12 January 2024 | (Norway) Ola Solbakken | Roma | (Japan) Urawa Reds | Loan |
| 12 January 2024 | Ettore Gliozzi | Pisa | Modena | Undisclosed |
| 12 January 2024 | Nicholas Bonfanti | Modena | Pisa | Undisclosed |
| 12 January 2024 | (Cameroon) Martin Hongla | Verona | (Spain) Granada | Undisclosed |
| 12 January 2024 | (Turkey) Berkan Kutlu | Genoa | (Turkey) Galatasaray | Loan return |
| 12 January 2024 | Alessio Brambilla | Cremonese | Gubbio | Loan |
| 12 January 2024 | Gabriele Boloca | Albenga | Ternana | Undisclosed |
| 13 January 2024 | Davide Faraoni | Verona | Fiorentina | Loan |
| 13 January 2024 | Francesco Donati | Empoli | Arezzo | Loan |
| 13 January 2024 | (Bosnia and Herzegovina) Rade Krunić | Milan | (Turkey) Fenerbahçe | Loan |
| 15 January 2024 | (Canada) Sebastian Breza | Bologna | (Canada) Montréal | Undisclosed |
| 15 January 2024 | (Uruguay) Joaquín Sosa | Bologna | (Canada) Montréal | Loan |
| 16 January 2024 | (Argentina) Santiago Pierotti | (Argentina) Colón | Lecce | Undisclosed |
| 16 January 2024 | (Finland) Jeremiah Streng | (Finland) SJK | Ascoli | Loan |
| 17 January 2024 | (Ivory Coast) Hamed Traorè | (England) Bournemouth | Napoli | Loan |
| 17 January 2024 | (Norway) Emil Bohinen | Salernitana | Genoa | Loan |
| 17 January 2024 | (Croatia) Toma Bašić | Lazio | Salernitana | Loan |
| 17 January 2024 | Alessandro Zanoli | Napoli | Salernitana | Loan |
| 17 January 2024 | Eric Lanini | Parma | Benevento | Loan |
| 17 January 2024 | Diego Malagrida | Sampdoria | Rimini | Loan |
| 17 January 2024 | Lorenzo Porcu | Sampdoria | Rimini | Undisclosed |
| 17 January 2024 | (France) Eddy Gnahoré | Ascoli | (Romania) Dinamo București | Undisclosed |
| 17 January 2024 | (Poland) Filip Jagiełło | Genoa | Spezia | Loan |
| 17 January 2024 | Marco Ballarini | Udinese | Triestina | Loan |
| 17 January 2024 | Alessandro Livieri | Pisa | Cremonese | Loan |
| 18 January 2024 | Nadir Zortea | Atalanta | Frosinone | Loan |
| 18 January 2024 | (Uruguay) Gastón Pereiro | Cagliari | Ternana | Loan |
| 18 January 2024 | Filippo Ranocchia | Juventus | Palermo | Undisclosed |
| 18 January 2024 | Gian Marco Crespi | Juventus | Spezia | Undisclosed |
| 18 January 2024 | Massimo Zilli | Cosenza | SPAL | Loan |
| 18 January 2024 | (Ghana) Bright Gyamfi | Potenza | Cosenza | Undisclosed |
| 18 January 2024 | (France) Marley Aké | Juventus | (Switzerland) Yverdon | Loan |
| 18 January 2024 | (Finland) Sauli Väisänen | (Denmark) Odense | Ascoli | Loan |
| 18 January 2024 | (Uruguay) Agustín Álvarez | Sassuolo | Sampdoria | Loan |
| 18 January 2024 | (Poland) Marcin Listkowski | Lecce | Lecco | Loan |
| 18 January 2024 | (Sweden) Zinedin Smajlović | Lecce | Lecco | Loan |
| 18 January 2024 | (Argentina) Joaquin Dalmasso | Foggia | Lecco | Undisclosed |
| 18 January 2024 | Giacomo Beretta | Foggia | Lecco | Loan |
| 18 January 2024 | Marco Frigerio | Foggia | Lecco | Undisclosed |
| 18 January 2024 | Lorenzo Pinzauti | Lecco | Renate | Loan |
| 18 January 2024 | (Lithuania) Edgaras Dubickas | Pisa | Feralpisalò | Loan |
| 18 January 2024 | Filippo Faggi | Virtus Entella | Bari | Loan |
| 19 January 2024 | (Serbia) Mihajlo Ilić | (Serbia) Partizan | Bologna | Undisclosed |
| 19 January 2024 | (Belgium) Cyril Ngonge | Verona | Napoli | Undisclosed |
| 19 January 2024 | (Colombia) Devis Vásquez | Milan | Ascoli | Loan |
| 19 January 2024 | (Romania) George Pușcaș | Genoa | Bari | Loan |
| 19 January 2024 | Federico Valietti | Genoa | Taranto | Loan |
| 19 January 2024 | Alberto Cerri | Como | Empoli | Loan |
| 19 January 2024 | (France) Daniel Frey | Cremonese | Pro Vercelli | Loan |
| 19 January 2024 | (France) Axel Guessand | Udinese | (Netherlands) Volendam | Loan |
| 19 January 2024 | (Poland) Bartłomiej Drągowski | Spezia | (Greece) Panathinaikos | Loan |
| 20 January 2024 | (Scotland) Josh Doig | Verona | Sassuolo | Undisclosed |
| 20 January 2024 | (Georgia (country)) Saba Goglichidze | (Georgia (country)) Torpedo Kutaisi | Empoli | Undisclosed |
| 20 January 2024 | Laurens Serpe | Spezia | Turris | Loan |
| 21 January 2024 | (Brazil) Matias Antonini | Taranto | Catanzaro | Undisclosed |
| 22 January 2024 | (Portugal) Tiago Djaló | (France) Lille | Juventus | €3.6M |
| 22 January 2024 | (Argentina) Luka Romero | Milan | (Spain) Almería | Loan |
| 23 January 2024 | (Greece) Panos Katseris | Catanzaro | (France) Lorient | Undisclosed |
| 23 January 2024 | (Netherlands) Jayden Braaf | Verona | (Netherlands) Fortuna Sittard | Loan |
| 23 January 2024 | (Netherlands) Tijjani Noslin | (Netherlands) Fortuna Sittard | Verona | Undisclosed |
| 23 January 2024 | (Netherlands) Elayis Tavşan | (Netherlands) NEC | Verona | Undisclosed |
| 23 January 2024 | (Senegal) Demba Seck | Torino | Frosinone | Loan |
| 23 January 2024 | Stefano Minelli | Feralpisalò | Novara | Undisclosed |
| 23 January 2024 | Christian Acella | Cremonese | Giana Erminio | Loan |
| 24 January 2024 | (Portugal) Vivaldo Semedo | Udinese | (Netherlands) Volendam | Loan |
| 24 January 2024 | Diego Falcinelli | Modena | Spezia | Undisclosed |
| 24 January 2024 | (Czech Republic) Aleš Matějů | Palermo | Spezia | Undisclosed |
| 24 January 2024 | (Bulgaria) Dimo Krastev | Fiorentina | Feralpisalò | Loan |
| 24 January 2024 | (Sweden) Riccardo Gagliolo | (Cyprus) AEK Larnaca | Ascoli | Undisclosed |
| 25 January 2024 | (Serbia) Matija Popović | (Serbia) Partizan | Monza | Undisclosed |
| 25 January 2024 | Alessio Zerbin | Napoli | Monza | Loan |
| 25 January 2024 | Jacopo Petriccione | Crotone | Catanzaro | Undisclosed |
| 25 January 2024 | Simone Pafundi | Udinese | (Switzerland) Lausanne | 1-year loan |
| 25 January 2024 | (United States) Nicholas Gioacchini | (United States) St. Louis City | Como | Undisclosed |
| 25 January 2024 | (Austria) Matthias Braunöder | Austria Wien | Como | Loan |
| 25 January 2024 | (France) Kelvin Amian | Spezia | (France) Nantes | Loan |
| 25 January 2024 | (France) Reda Belahyane | (France) Nice | Verona | Undisclosed |
| 25 January 2024 | (Portugal) Dani Silva | (Portugal) Vitória de Guimarães | Verona | Undisclosed |
| 25 January 2024 | (France) Salim Diakité | Ternana | Palermo | Undisclosed |
| 25 January 2024 | Sekou Diawara | Udinese | (Belgium) Beerschot | Loan |
| 25 January 2024 | Filippo Sgarbi | Cosenza | Ternana | Loan |
| 26 January 2024 | (Uruguay) Matías Viña | Roma | (Brazil) Flamengo | Undisclosed |
| 26 January 2024 | (Belgium) Leander Dendoncker | (England) Aston Villa | Napoli | Loan |
| 26 January 2024 | (Germany) Koray Günter | Verona | (Turkey) Fatih Karagümrük | Loan |
| 26 January 2024 | (Portugal) Rúben Vinagre | (Portugal) Sporting CP | Verona | Loan |
| 26 January 2024 | (Republic of Ireland) Liam Kerrigan | Como | Novara | Loan |
| 26 January 2024 | (Cameroon) Jean-Pierre Nsame | (Switzerland) Young Boys | Como | Undisclosed |
| 26 January 2024 | Giorgio Cittadini | Atalanta | Genoa | Loan |
| 26 January 2024 | Luca Liverani | Alessandria | Feralpisalò | Undisclosed |
| 26 January 2024 | (Morocco) Hamza El Kaouakibi | Benevento | Südtirol | Loan |
| 26 January 2024 | (Bosnia and Herzegovina) Milan Đurić | Verona | Monza | Undisclosed |
| 27 January 2024 | (Albania) Kevin Haveri | Torino | Catania | Loan |
| 27 January 2024 | (Austria) Franz Stolz | (Austria) St. Pölten | Genoa | Undisclosed |
| 27 January 2024 | Simone Simeri | Bari | Taranto | Loan |
| 28 January 2024 | (Switzerland) Samuel Ballet | (Switzerland) Winterthur | Como | Loan |
| 28 January 2024 | Edoardo Goldaniga | Cagliari | Como | Undisclosed |
| 29 January 2024 | (Austria) Marlon Mustapha | Como | (Germany) Fortuna Düsseldorf | Loan |
| 29 January 2024 | (Brazil) Gabriel Strefezza | Lecce | Como | Loan |
| 29 January 2024 | (Croatia) Josip Brekalo | Fiorentina | (Croatia) Fortuna Düsseldorf | Loan |
| 29 January 2024 | Valerio Mantovani | Ternana | Ascoli | Loan |
| 29 January 2024 | (Portugal) Domingos Quina | Udinese | (Portugal) Vizela | Loan |
| 29 January 2024 | (Republic of Ireland) James Abankwah | (England) Charlton Athletic | Udinese | Loan return |
| 30 January 2024 | (Argentina) Santiago Castro | (Argentina) Vélez Sarsfield | Bologna | Undisclosed |
| 30 January 2024 | (Spain) Angeliño | (Germany) RB Leipzig | Roma | Loan |
| 30 January 2024 | (France) Karim Zedadka | (Luxembourg) Swift Hesperange | Ascoli | Loan |
| 30 January 2024 | Riccardo Saponara | Verona | (Turkey) Ankaragücü | Undisclosed |
| 30 January 2024 | Joshua Tenkorang | Cremonese | Foggia | Loan |
| 30 January 2024 | Tommaso Fumagalli | Giana Erminio | Como | Undisclosed |
| 30 January 2024 | Giacomo Manzari | Sassuolo | Feralpisalò | Loan |
| 30 January 2024 | Romeo Giovannini | Modena | Virtus Entella | Loan |
| 31 January 2024 | Emanuele Valeri | Cremonese | Frosinone | Undisclosed |
| 31 January 2024 | (Serbia) Nemanja Radonjić | Torino | (Spain) Mallorca | Loan |
| 31 January 2024 | (Croatia) Roko Jureškin | Pisa | Spezia | Loan |
| 31 January 2024 | (Hungary) Ádám Nagy | Pisa | Spezia | Loan |
| 31 January 2024 | Cristiano Piccini | (Germany) 1. FC Magdeburg | Sampdoria | Undisclosed |
| 31 January 2024 | (Nigeria) David Ankeye | (Moldova) Sheriff Tiraspol | Genoa | Undisclosed |
| 31 January 2024 | Christian Dalle Mura | Fiorentina | Ternana | Loan |
| 31 January 2024 | (Argentina) Carlos Alcaraz | (England) Southampton | Juventus | Loan |
| 31 January 2024 | (Slovakia) Dávid Ďuriš | (Slovakia) Žilina | Ascoli | Loan |
| 31 January 2024 | (Croatia) Mirko Marić | Monza | (Croatia) Rijeka | Loan |
| 31 January 2024 | Eugenio Lamanna | Monza | Lecco | Undisclosed |
| 31 January 2024 | Dennis Curatolo | Internazionale | Pro Patria | Loan |
| 31 January 2024 | (Ukraine) Ruslan Malinovskyi | (France) Marseille | Genoa | Undisclosed (Note: The player already played for his new club in the 2023–24 season, the deal turned from temporary to definitive.) |
| 31 January 2024 | (Senegal) M'Baye Niang | (Turkey) Adana Demirspor | Empoli | Undisclosed |
| 31 January 2024 | (Greece) Triantafyllos Pasalidis | (Greece) OFI Crete | Salernitana | Undisclosed |
| 31 January 2024 | Matteo Lovato | Salernitana | Torino | Loan |
| 31 January 2024 | (Austria) Flavius Daniliuc | Salernitana | (Austria) Red Bull Salzburg | Loan |
| 31 January 2024 | (Norway) Erik Botheim | Salernitana | (Sweden) Malmö | Undisclosed |
| 31 January 2024 | (Czech Republic) David Zima | Torino | (Czech Republic) Slavia Prague | Undisclosed |
| 31 January 2024 | Filippo Nardi | Cremonese | Benevento | Loan |
| 31 January 2024 | Christian Pierobon | Verona | Juve Stabia | Undisclosed |
| 31 January 2024 | (Slovakia) Tomáš Suslov | (Netherlands) Groningen | Verona | Undisclosed |
| 31 January 2024 | Luca Giudici | Lecco | Feralpisalò | Undisclosed |
| 31 January 2024 | Vittorio Parigini | Feralpisalò | Lecco | Undisclosed |
| 31 January 2024 | Mario Ierardi | Vicenza | Lecco | Loan |
| 31 January 2024 | (Spain) Álex Blanco | Como | Reggiana | Undisclosed |
| 31 January 2024 | Luca Ghiringhelli | Südtirol | SPAL | Loan |
| 31 January 2024 | Jonas Heinz | Südtirol | Fermana | Loan |
| 31 January 2024 | Marco Delle Monache | Sampdoria | Vicenza | Loan |
| 31 January 2024 | (Argentina) Gregorio Tanco | (Argentina) Banfield | Spezia | Undisclosed |
| 1 February 2024 | Andrea Belotti | Roma | Fiorentina | Loan |
| 1 February 2024 | Nicola Valente | Palermo | Padova | Undisclosed |
| 1 February 2024 | Francesco Ardizzone | Lecco | Monopoli | Loan |
| 1 February 2024 | (Argentina) Joaquin Dalmasso | Lecco | Monopoli | Loan |
| 1 February 2024 | Matteo Battistini | Lecco | Crotone | Loan |
| 1 February 2024 | (France) Brandon Soppy | Atalanta | (Germany) Schalke 04 | Loan |
| 1 February 2024 | (Portugal) Vitinha | (France) Marseille | Genoa | Loan |
| 1 February 2024 | (Nigeria) David Okereke | Cremonese | Torino | Loan |
| 1 February 2024 | (Morocco) Adam Masina | Udinese | Torino | Loan |
| 1 February 2024 | Emanuel Vignato | Pisa | Salernitana | Loan |
| 1 February 2024 | (Argentina) Marco Pellegrino | Milan | Salernitana | Loan |
| 1 February 2024 | (Spain) Jordi Mboula | Verona | (Spain) Racing Santander | Undisclosed |
| 1 February 2024 | (Argentina) Bruno Amione | Verona | (Mexico) Santos Laguna | Undisclosed |
| 1 February 2024 | (Australia) Ajdin Hrustic | Verona | (Netherlands) Heracles | Undisclosed |
| 1 February 2024 | (France) Fabien Centonze | (France) Nantes | Verona | Loan |
| 1 February 2024 | (Poland) Karol Świderski | (United States) Charlotte | Verona | Loan |
| 1 February 2024 | (Denmark) Jens Odgaard | (Netherlands) AZ | Bologna | Loan |
| 1 February 2024 | (Sweden) Kazper Karlsson | (Sweden) Halmstad | Bologna | Undisclosed |
| 1 February 2024 | (Sweden) Alem Nezirevic | Internazionale | Bologna | Loan |
| 1 February 2024 | (Nigeria) Orji Okwonkwo | Bologna | Reggiana | Loan |
| 1 February 2024 | (Netherlands) Sydney van Hooijdonk | Bologna | (England) Norwich City | Loan |
| 1 February 2024 | (France) Yann Karamoh | Torino | (France) Montpellier | Loan |
| 1 February 2024 | (Serbia) Uroš Kabić | (Serbia) Red Star Belgrade | Torino | Loan |
| 1 February 2024 | (Israel) Shon Weissman | (Spain) Granada | Salernitana | Loan |
| 1 February 2024 | (France) Iron Gomis | (Turkey) Kasımpaşa | Salernitana | Loan |
| 1 February 2024 | (Spain) Kaleb Jiménez | Salernitana | Atalanta U23 | Loan |
| 1 February 2024 | Alessandro Mallamo | Atalanta U23 | Südtirol | Loan |
| 1 February 2024 | Giuseppe Di Serio | Atalanta U23 | Spezia | Loan |
| 1 February 2024 | (Ivory Coast) Chaka Traorè | Milan | Palermo | Loan |
| 1 February 2024 | (Colombia) Yerry Mina | Fiorentina | Cagliari | Undisclosed |
| 1 February 2024 | Gianluca Gaetano | Napoli | Cagliari | Loan |
| 1 February 2024 | Alessandro Bolzan | Roma | Cagliari | Undisclosed |
| 1 February 2024 | Jacopo Simonetta | SPAL | Cagliari | Undisclosed |
| 1 February 2024 | Jacopo Desogus | Cagliari | Gubbio | Loan |
| 1 February 2024 | Gianluca Contini | Cagliari | Virtus Francavilla | Loan |
| 1 February 2024 | (Turkey) İsak Vural | (Sweden) Hammarby | Frosinone | Undisclosed |
| 1 February 2024 | (France) Etienne Camara | Udinese | (Belgium) Charleroi | Undisclosed |
| 1 February 2024 | (Albania) Marash Kumbulla | Roma | Sassuolo | Loan |
| 1 February 2024 | Tommaso Baldanzi | Empoli | Roma | Undisclosed |
| 1 February 2024 | Ottavio Garau | Ternana | Juve Stabia | Loan |
| 1 February 2024 | Pietro Rovaglia | Ternana | Casertana | Loan |
| 1 February 2024 | Lorenzo Amatucci | Fiorentina | Ternana | Loan |
| 1 February 2024 | Riccardo Zoia | Vis Pesaro | Ternana | Loan |
| 1 February 2024 | Denis Franchi | (England) Burnley | Ternana | Undisclosed |
| 1 February 2024 | (Canada) Damiano Pecile | Venezia | Vis Pesaro | Loan |
| 1 February 2024 | (Norway) Dennis Johnsen | Venezia | Cremonese | Undisclosed |
| 1 February 2024 | Luca Marrone | Lecco | Cremonese | Loan |
| 1 February 2024 | Lorenzo Di Stefano | Empoli | Modena | Undisclosed |
| 1 February 2024 | Gabriele Guarino | Empoli | Modena | Loan |
| 1 February 2024 | Simone Santoro | Perugia | Modena | Loan |
| 1 February 2024 | (Burkina Faso) Abdoul Guiebre | Modena | Perugia | Loan |
| 1 February 2024 | Luca Stanga | Lecco | Juve Stabia | Loan |
| 1 February 2024 | Gabriel Lunetta | Südtirol | Lecco | Undisclosed |
| 1 February 2024 | Umberto Eusepi | Lecco | Monterosi | Undisclosed |
| 1 February 2024 | Roberto Inglese | Parma | Lecco | Loan |
| 1 February 2024 | Antonino La Gumina | Sampdoria | (Spain) Mirandés | Loan |
| 1 February 2024 | (The Gambia) Ebrima Darboe | Roma | Sampdoria | Loan |
| 1 February 2024 | Simone Panada | Sampdoria | Atalanta U23 | Loan return |
| 1 February 2024 | Giuseppe Di Serio | Atalanta U23 | Spezia | Loan |
| 1 February 2024 | Mirko Antonucci | Spezia | Cosenza | Loan |
| 1 February 2024 | Andrea Rispoli | Cosenza | Crotone | Undisclosed |
| 1 February 2024 | (Brazil) Fellipe Jack | (Brazil) Palmeiras | Como | Loan |
| 1 February 2024 | Diego Stramaccioni | Juventus | Reggiana | Undisclosed |
| 1 February 2024 | Diego Stramaccioni | Reggiana | Juventus Next Gen | Loan |
| 2 February 2024 | (Germany) Jérôme Boateng | Unattached | Salernitana | Free |
| 2 February 2024 | Elio Capradossi | Cagliari | Lecco | Free |
| 6 February 2024 | (Chile) Pablo Galdames | Genoa | (Brazil) Vasco da Gama | Undisclosed |
| 9 February 2024 | (Greece) Kostas Manolas | Unattached | Salernitana | Free |
