= 2023–24 Calcio Lecco 1912 season =

Calcio Lecco 1912
2023–24 season
- Manager: Luciano Foschi (until 9 October); Emiliano Bonazzoli (from 12 October)
- Stadium: Stadio Rigamonti-Ceppi
- Serie B: 20th (relegated)
- Top goalscorer: League: Nicolò Buso (8); All: Nicolò Buso (8)
| Home colours | Away colours | Third colours |

The 2023–24 season is Calcio Lecco 1912's 112th season in existence and the club's first season in the second division of Italian football. The season covers the period from 1 July 2023 to 30 June 2024.

== Players ==
=== First-team squad ===
As of 28 September 2023

Note: Flags indicate national team as defined under FIFA eligibility rules; some limited exceptions apply. Players may hold more than one non-FIFA nationality.

| No. | Pos. | Nation | Player |
|---|---|---|---|
| 1 | GK | ITA | Riccardo Melgrati |
| 2 | DF | CRO | Vedran Celjak |
| 5 | MF | ITA | Duccio Degli Innocenti (on loan from Empoli) |
| 6 | DF | ITA | Alessandro Bianconi |
| 7 | MF | ITA | Luca Giudici |
| 8 | MF | ITA | Alessandro Sersanti (on loan from Juventus) |
| 9 | FW | ITA | Umberto Eusepi |
| 11 | FW | ITA | Mattia Tordini |
| 12 | GK | ITA | Luca Bonadeo |
| 13 | DF | ITA | Matteo Battistini |
| 16 | MF | ITA | Joshua Tenkorang (on loan from Cremonese) |
| 17 | DF | ITA | Alessandro Caporale |
| 18 | FW | ITA | Lorenzo Pinzauti |
| 20 | DF | ITA | Francesco Donati (on loan from Empoli) |
| 21 | MF | ITA | Giovanni Crociata |

| No. | Pos. | Nation | Player |
|---|---|---|---|
| 22 | GK | ITA | Umberto Saracco (on loan from Cerignola) |
| 23 | MF | ITA | Eyob Zambataro |
| 27 | MF | MDA | Artur Ioniță (on loan from Pisa) |
| 32 | DF | ITA | Franco Lepore |
| 34 | DF | ITA | Luca Marrone |
| 44 | MF | ITA | Davide Guglielmotti |
| 68 | DF | ALB | Brayan Boci (on loan from Genoa) |
| 73 | FW | ITA | Lorenzo Di Stefano |
| 77 | FW | ITA | Doudou Mangni |
| 80 | MF | ITA | Vittorio Agostinelli (on loan from Fiorentina) |
| 83 | DF | BEL | Mats Lemmens (on loan from Lecce) |
| 90 | FW | USA | Andrija Novakovich (on loan from Venezia) |
| 96 | MF | ITA | Giorgio Galli |
| 99 | FW | ITA | Nicolò Buso |
| — | MF | ITA | Francesco Ardizzone |

=== Out on loan ===
Note: Flags indicate national team as defined under FIFA eligibility rules; some limited exceptions apply. Players may hold more than one non-FIFA nationality.

| No. | Pos. | Nation | Player |
|---|---|---|---|
| — | DF | ITA | Luca Stanga (at Rimini until 30 June 2024) |
| — | MF | ITA | Carlo Ilari (at Lumezzane until 30 June 2024) |

| No. | Pos. | Nation | Player |
|---|---|---|---|
| — | FW | ITA | Cristian Bunino (at Brindisi until 30 June 2024) |
| — | FW | ITA | Alessandro Galeandro (at Gubbio until 30 June 2024) |

== Transfers ==
=== In ===
| Pos. | Player | Transferred from | Fee | Date | Source |
|---|---|---|---|---|---|
| MF | (Italy) Giovanni Crociata | (Italy) Empoli | Undisclosed | 1 September 2023 | |
| MF | (Italy) Vittorio Agostinelli | (Italy) Fiorentina | Loan | 8 September 2023 | |
| MF | (Finland) Henri Salomaa | (Italy) Lecce | Loan | 5 January 2024 | |
| DF | (France) Corentin Louakima | (Italy) Roma | Undisclosed | 9 January 2024 | |
| FW | (Italy) Eddie Salcedo | (Italy) Inter Milan | Loan | 10 January 2024 | |

=== Out ===
| Pos. | Player | Transferred to | Fee | Date | Source |

== Pre-season and friendlies ==
Win Draw Loss Fixtures

| 23 August 2023 Friendly | Pro Vercelli (Italy) | 0–2 | (Italy) Lecco | Lecco |
| 17:00 CEST (UTC+2) | | | Giudici 20'; Mangni 89' | Stadium: Stadio Rigamonti-Ceppi |

== Competitions ==
=== Overview ===
| Competition | First match | Last match | Starting round | Final position | Record | | | | | | | |
| Competition | First match | Last match | Starting round | Final position | Pld | W | D | L | GF | GA | GD | Win % |
|---|---|---|---|---|---|---|---|---|---|---|---|---|
| Serie B | 3 September 2023 | 10 May 2024 | Matchday 1 | 20th | 38 | 6 | 8 | 24 | 35 | 74 | −39 | 15.79 |
| Total | | | | | 38 | 6 | 8 | 24 | 35 | 74 | −39 | 15.79 |

Source: Competitions

=== Serie B ===
==== League table ====
| Pos | Team | Pld | W | D | L | GF | GA | GD | Pts | Promotion, qualification or relegation |
|---|---|---|---|---|---|---|---|---|---|---|
| 16 | Ternana (R) | 38 | 11 | 10 | 17 | 43 | 50 | −7 | 43 | Qualification for relegation play-out |
| 17 | Bari | 38 | 8 | 17 | 13 | 38 | 49 | −11 | 41 (Note: Bari finished ahead of Ascoli on head-to-head points: Bari 1–0 Ascoli, Ascoli 2–2 Bari.) | Qualification for relegation play-out |
| 18 | Ascoli (R) | 38 | 9 | 14 | 15 | 38 | 42 | −4 | 41 | Relegation to Serie C |
| 19 | Feralpisalò (R) | 38 | 8 | 9 | 21 | 44 | 65 | −21 | 33 | Relegation to Serie C |
| 20 | Lecco (R) | 38 | 6 | 8 | 24 | 35 | 74 | −39 | 26 | Relegation to Serie C |

Source: Soccerway (in English)
Rules for classification: 1) Points; 2) Head-to-head points; 3) Head-to-head goal difference; 4) Goal difference; 5) Goals scored; 6) Draw.
(Note: Head-to-head record is used only after all the matches between the teams in question have been played)
(R) Relegated

==== Results summary ====
| Overall | | | | | | | | Home | | | | | | Away | | | | | |
| Pld | W | D | L | GF | GA | GD | Pts | W | D | L | GF | GA | GD | W | D | L | GF | GA | GD |
|---|---|---|---|---|---|---|---|---|---|---|---|---|---|---|---|---|---|---|---|
| 38 | 6 | 8 | 24 | 35 | 74 | −39 | 26 | 4 | 2 | 13 | 19 | 34 | −15 | 2 | 6 | 11 | 16 | 40 | −24 |

==== Results by round ====
| Round | 1 | 2 | 3 | 4 | 5 | 6 | 7 | 8 | 9 | 10 | 11 | 12 | 13 | 14 | 15 | 16 | 17 | 18 | 19 | 20 | 21 | 22 | 23 | 24 | 25 | 26 | 27 | 28 | 29 | 30 | 31 | 32 | 33 | 34 | 35 | 36 | 37 | 38 |
|---|---|---|---|---|---|---|---|---|---|---|---|---|---|---|---|---|---|---|---|---|---|---|---|---|---|---|---|---|---|---|---|---|---|---|---|---|---|---|
| Ground | A | H | A | H | H | A | H | A | A | H | A | A | H | A | H | A | H | A | H | A | H | A | H | A | H | A | H | A | H | A | H | A | H | H | A | H | A | H |
| Result | W | D | D | L | L | D | L | L | L | L | W | D | W | L | W | L | L | D | W | L | L | L | L | L | L | D | L | L | L | L | D | D | W | L | L | L | L | L |
| Position | 4 | 6 | 7 | 8 | 13 | 15 | 16 | 16 | 18 | 19 | 17 | 17 | 16 | 17 | 16 | 16 | 19 | 17 | 16 | 16 | 17 | 20 | 20 | 20 | 20 | 20 | 20 | 20 | 20 | 20 | 20 | 20 | 20 | 20 | 20 | 20 | 20 | 20 |

A = Away; H = Home; W = Win; D = Draw; L = Loss

==== Matches ====
The league fixtures were unveiled on 11 July 2023.

| 3 September 2023 4 | Lecco | 3–4 | Catanzaro | Lecco |
| 18:30 CEST (UTC+2) | | | | Stadium: Stadio Rigamonti-Ceppi |

| 16 September 2023 5 | Lecco | 0–2 | Brescia | Lecco |
| 14:00 CEST (UTC+2) | Novakovich (penalty missed) 16'; Eusepi (penalty missed) 90+7' | | Borelli 3'; Bianchi 63' | Stadium: Stadio Rigamonti-Ceppi |

| 23 September 2023 6 | Modena | 0–0 | Lecco | Modena |
| 14:00 CEST (UTC+2) | | | | Stadium: Stadio Alberto Braglia |

| 26 September 2023 7 | Lecco | 1–2 | Feralpisalò | Lecco |
| 18:15 CEST (UTC+2) | | | | Stadium: Stadio Rigamonti-Ceppi |

| 1 October 2023 8 | Cittadella | 2–1 | Lecco | Cittadella |
| 16:15 CEST (UTC+2) | | | | Stadium: Stadio Pier Cesare Tombolato |

| 7 October 2023 9 | Cosenza | 3–0 | Lecco | Cosenza |
| 14:00 CEST (UTC+2) | | | | Stadium: Stadio San Vito-Gigi Marulla |

| 21 October 2023 10 | Lecco | 0–2 | Ascoli | Lecco |
| 14:00 CEST (UTC+2) | Di Stefano (penalty missed) 50' | | Nestorovski 35'; Quaranta 55' | Stadium: Stadio Rigamonti-Ceppi |

| 24 October 2023 1 | Pisa | 1–2 | Lecco | Pisa |
| 18:30 CEST (UTC+2) | Tramoni 63' | | Bianconi 24'; Tordini 90+6' |

| 29 October 2023 11 | Palermo | 1–2 | Lecco | Palermo |
| 16:15 CET (UTC+1) | Brunori 90+6' | | Crociata 8'; Sersanti 41' | Stadium: Stadio Renzo Barbera; Referee: Marco Piccinini |

| 5 November 2023 12 | Reggiana | 1–1 | Lecco | Reggio Calabria |
| 16:15 CET (UTC+1) | | | | Stadium: Mapei Stadium – Città del Tricolore; Referee: Paride Tremolada |

| 8 November 2023 2 | Lecco | 0–0 | Spezia | Lecco |
| 18:30 CET (UTC+1) | | | | Stadium: Stadio Rigamonti-Ceppi; Referee: Marco Monaldi |

| 12 November 2023 13 | Lecco | 3–2 | Parma | Lecco |
| 16:15 CET (UTC+1) | | | | Stadium: Stadio Rigamonti-Ceppi |

| 25 November 2023 14 | Cremonese | 1–0 | Lecco | Cremona |
| 14:00 CET (UTC+1) | | | | Stadium: Stadio Giovanni Zini |

| 28 November 2023 3 | Como | 0–0 | Lecco | Como |
| 18:30 CET (UTC+1) | | | | Stadium: Stadio Giuseppe Sinigaglia |

| 3 December 2023 15 | Lecco | 1–0 | Bari | Lecco |
| 16:15 CET (UTC+1) | | | | Stadium: Stadio Rigamonti-Ceppi |

| 9 December 2023 16 | Sampdoria | 2–0 | Lecco | Genoa |
| 14:00 CET (UTC+1) | | | | Stadium: Stadio Luigi Ferraris |

| 17 December 2023 17 | Lecco | 2–3 | Ternana | Lecco |
| 16:15 CET (UTC+1) | | | | Stadium: Stadio Rigamonti-Ceppi |

| 23 December 2023 18 | Venezia | 2–2 | Lecco | Venice |
| 14:00 CET (UTC+1) | | | | Stadium: Stadio Pier Luigi Penzo |

| 26 December 2023 19 | Lecco | 2–1 | Südtirol | Lecco |
| 15:00 CET (UTC+1) | | | | Stadium: Stadio Rigamonti-Ceppi |

| 12 January 2024 20 | Catanzaro | 5–3 | Lecco | Catanzaro |
| 20:30 CET (UTC+1) | | | | Stadium: Stadio Nicola Ceravolo |

| 20 January 2024 21 | Lecco | 1–3 | Pisa | Lecco |
| 16:15 CET (UTC+1) | | | | Stadium: Stadio Rigamonti-Ceppi |

| 27 January 2024 22 | Feralpisalò | 5–1 | Lecco | Salò |
| 16:15 CET (UTC+1) | | | | Stadium: Stadio Lino Turina |

| 3 February 2024 23 | Lecco | 0–1 | Cremonese | Lecco |
| 16:15 CET (UTC+1) | | | | Stadium: Stadio Rigamonti-Ceppi |

| 10 February 2024 24 | Bari | 3–1 | Lecco | Bari |
| 16:15 CET (UTC+1) | Benali 26'; Pușcaș 53'; Sibilli 69' | | Novakovich 81' | Stadium: Stadio San Nicola; Referee: Francesco Cosso |

| 17 February 2024 25 | Lecco | 1–3 | Cosenza | Lecco |
| 14:00 CET (UTC+1) | | | | Stadium: Stadio Rigamonti-Ceppi |

| 24 February 2024 26 | Ternana | 0–0 | Lecco | Terni |
| 16:15 CET (UTC+1) |

| 27 February 2024 27 | Lecco | 0–3 | Como | Lecco |
| 20:30 CET (UTC+1) | | | | Stadium: Stadio Rigamonti-Ceppi |

| 2 March 2024 28 | Südtirol | 1–0 | Lecco | Bolzano |
| 14:00 CET (UTC+1) |

| 10 March 2024 29 | Lecco | 0–1 | Palermo | Lecco |
| 16:15 CET (UTC+1) | | | | Stadium: Stadio Rigamonti-Ceppi |

| 17 March 2024 30 | Ascoli | 4–1 | Lecco | Ascoli Piceno |
| 16:15 CET (UTC+1) |

| 1 April 2024 31 | Lecco | 1–1 | Cittadella | Lecco |
| 15:00 CEST (UTC+2) | | | | Stadium: Stadio Rigamonti-Ceppi |

| 6 April 2024 32 | Spezia | 1–1 | Lecco | La Spezia |
| 14:00 CEST (UTC+2) |

| 13 April 2024 33 | Lecco | 1–0 | Reggiana | Lecco |
| 16:15 CEST (UTC+2) | Ioniță 60' | Report | | Stadium: Stadio Rigamonti-Ceppi; Referee: Daniele Minelli |

| 20 April 2024 34 | Lecco | 1–2 | Venezia | Lecco |
| 16:15 CEST (UTC+2) | | | | Stadium: Stadio Rigamonti-Ceppi |

| 27 April 2024 35 | Parma | 4–0 | Lecco | Parma |
| 14:00 CEST (UTC+2) | Bernabé 15', 31'; Mihăilă 22'; Camara 88' | | | Stadium: Stadio Ennio Tardini |

| 1 May 2024 36 | Lecco | 0–1 | Sampdoria | Lecco |
| 18:00 CEST (UTC+2) | | | | Stadium: Stadio Rigamonti-Ceppi |

| 5 May 2024 37 | Brescia | 4–1 | Lecco | Brescia |
| 15:00 CEST (UTC+2) | | | | Stadium: Stadio Mario Rigamonti |

| 10 May 2024 38 | Lecco | 2–3 | Modena | Lecco |
| 20:30 CEST (UTC+2) | | | | Stadium: Stadio Rigamonti-Ceppi |
