= Poznań Stadium =

Association football stadium in Poznań, Poland

Stadion Poznań
- Bulgarian Street Stadium; Polish: Stadion przy ul.Bułgarskiej; Municipal Stadium; Polish: Stadion Miejski

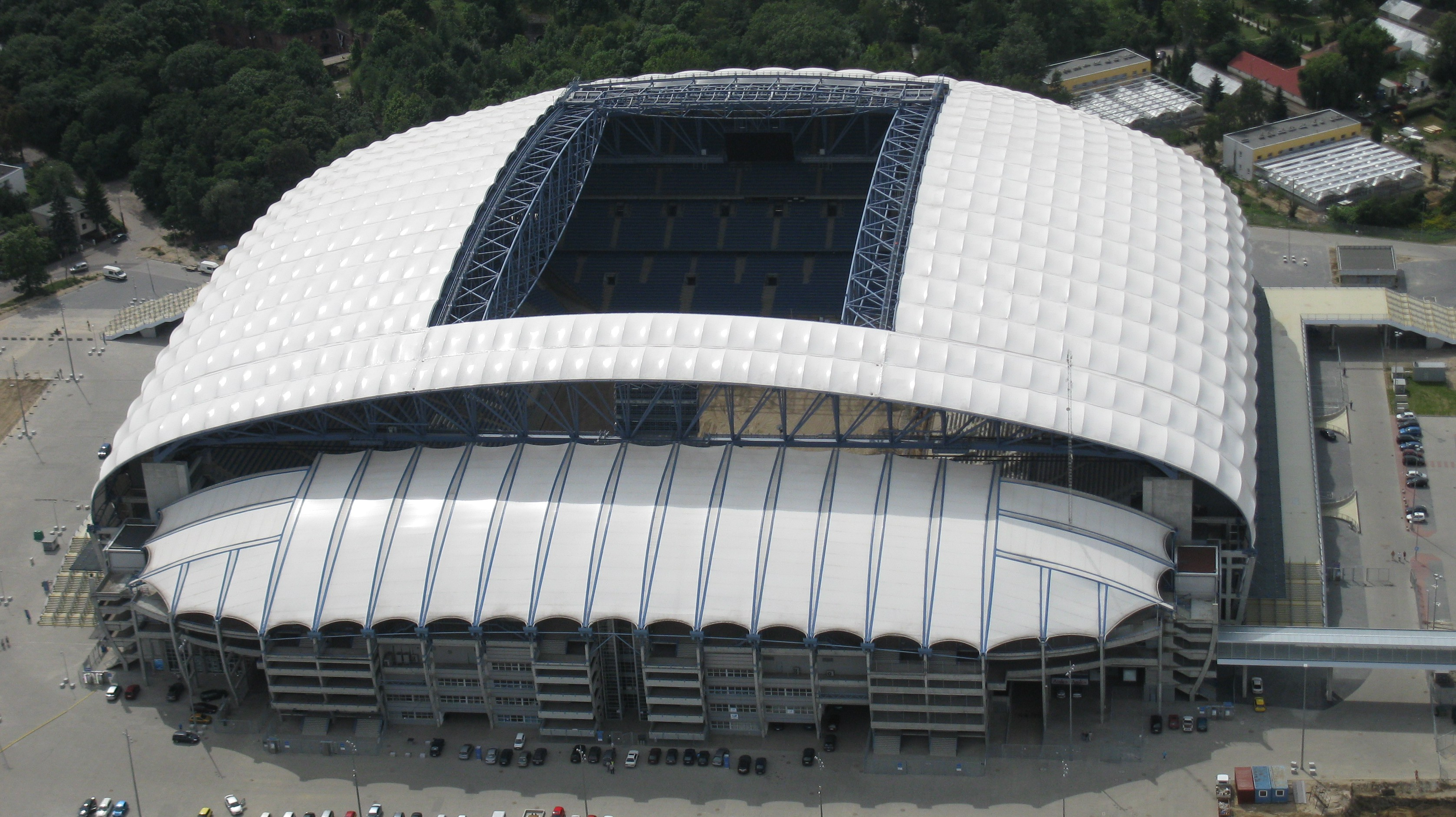
- UEFA Category 4 Stadium
- Interactive map of Stadion Poznań
- Former names: INEA Stadion (14 June 2013-30 June 2018)
- Location: ul. Bułgarska 17, 60-320 Poznań, Poland
- Coordinates: 52°23′51″N 16°51′28″E
- Owner: City of Poznań
- Operator: Lech Poznań
- Capacity: 42,837
- Surface: Grass
- Record attendance: 45,000 (Lech Poznań-Widzew Łódź, 8 April 1984)
- Field size: 105 × 68 m

Construction
- Groundbreaking: 1968
- Built: 1968–1980
- Opened: 23 August 1980
- Renovated: 2003–2010
- Cost: ≈760 million PLN (renovation only)
- Architect: Modern Construction Design Sp. z o.o.

Tenants
- Lech Poznań (1980–present); Warta Poznań (2010–2012); Poland national football team (selected matches)

The Stadion Poznań (English: Poznań Stadium), also called the Municipal Stadium in Poznań (Polish: Stadion Miejski w Poznaniu, pronounced [ˈstadjɔn ˈmjɛjskʲi]) and the Bulgarian Street Stadium (Polish: Stadion przy ul.Bułgarskiej) after the road it is situated on, is an association football stadium in the Grunwald district of Poznań, Poland. It has a capacity of 42,837 (all seated). The stadium was originally built between 1968 and 1980. From its inauguration in August 1980, Lech Poznań has used the ground as its main venue. It has also been used sporadically by Warta Poznań.

In the years 2003–2010, the stadium underwent a complete reconstruction, including the building of four new fully covered stands. Currently it is the fifth-largest stadium in Poland (after National Stadium, Silesian Stadium, Stadion Wrocław and Stadion Gdańsk) and third largest in Ekstraklasa (after the latter two). The grand opening after final renovation took place on 20 September 2010, with Sting's Symphonicity Tour concert.

From July 2023 the stadium is called ENEA Stadion, for sponsorship reasons.

== History ==
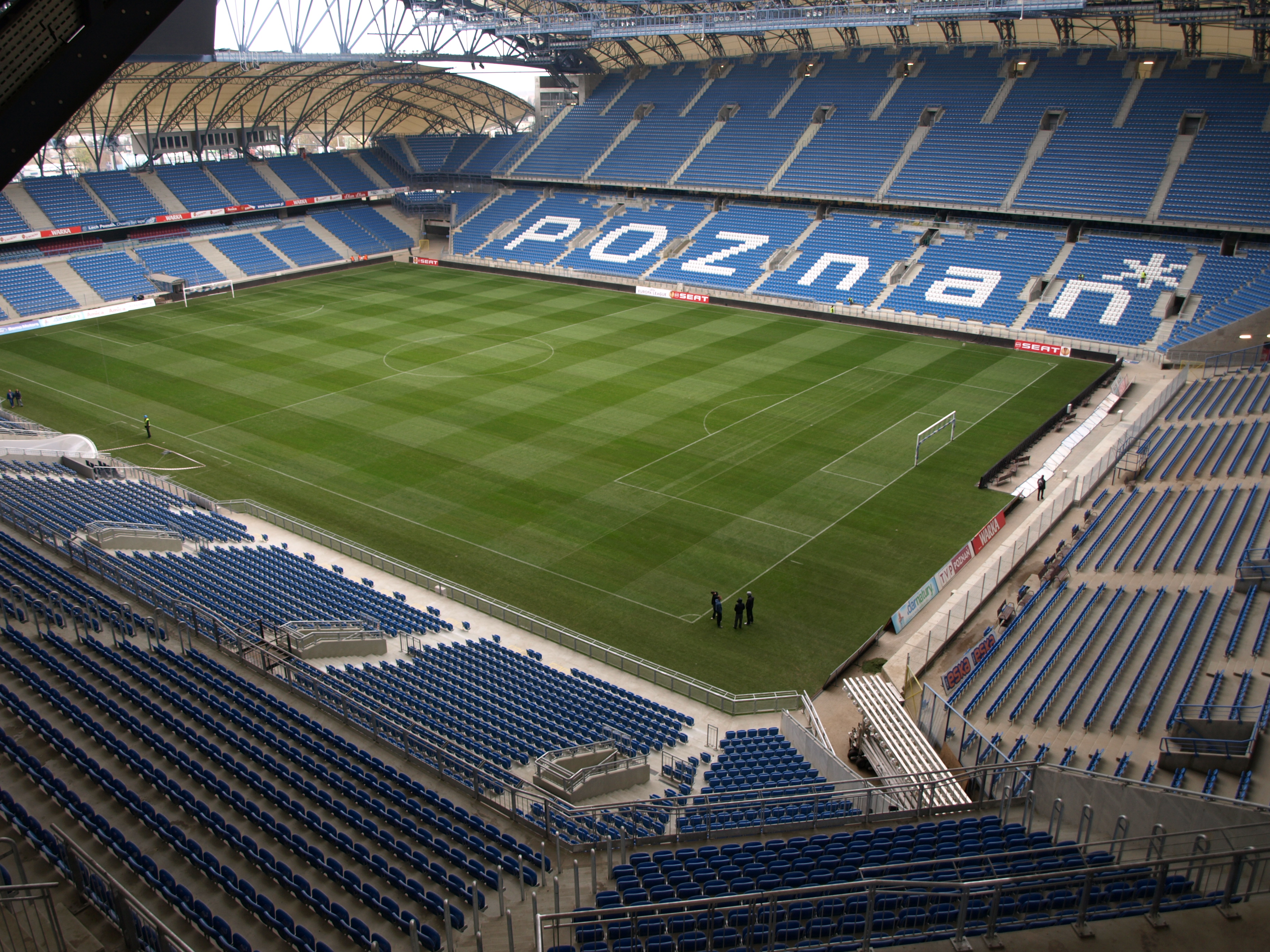
Stadium interior in 2010

Construction works of the Municipal Stadium began in 1968. Like most stadiums in those times, it was built on artificial hills on which concrete benches and crown of the stadium was later formed. The construction consisted of three stands (in a characteristic U-shaped style), while the place dedicated for the fourth stand was left free. Swimming pool and gyms were supposed to be built there, but that plan was never realized. It took almost 12 years to complete the whole structure. The first match of the new stadium was a 1–1 draw between Lech Poznan and Motor Lublin played on 23 August 1980 with an audience of 18,000 people. The first goal scorer for the home team at the new stadium was Marek Skurczyński.

Six years later the most specific elements of the stadium were built - four 56-meter-high masts with floodlights whose total illuminance was 1890 lux. Floodlights were used for the first time in a match between National teams of Poland and Greece (2–1).

Record attendance was noted on 8 April 1984, when the stadium was filled with about 45,000 spectators, while the official capacity at that time was only 40,000. The opponent was Widzew Łódź and the match ended 1–0 with a victory for Lech Poznan. A few years later, Municipal Stadium was equipped with an electronic scoreboard, which was placed behind the sector number 8. For many years, there had not been any modernization work besides installing new plastic chairs in the early 1990s.

In this stadium, Lech Poznan began its "golden age". In the 1980s and 1990s, Lech won five league titles (1982–83, 1983–84, 1989–90, 1991–92, 1992–93), three Polish Cups (1981–82, 1983–84, 1987–88) and two Polish Super Cups (1990, 1992).

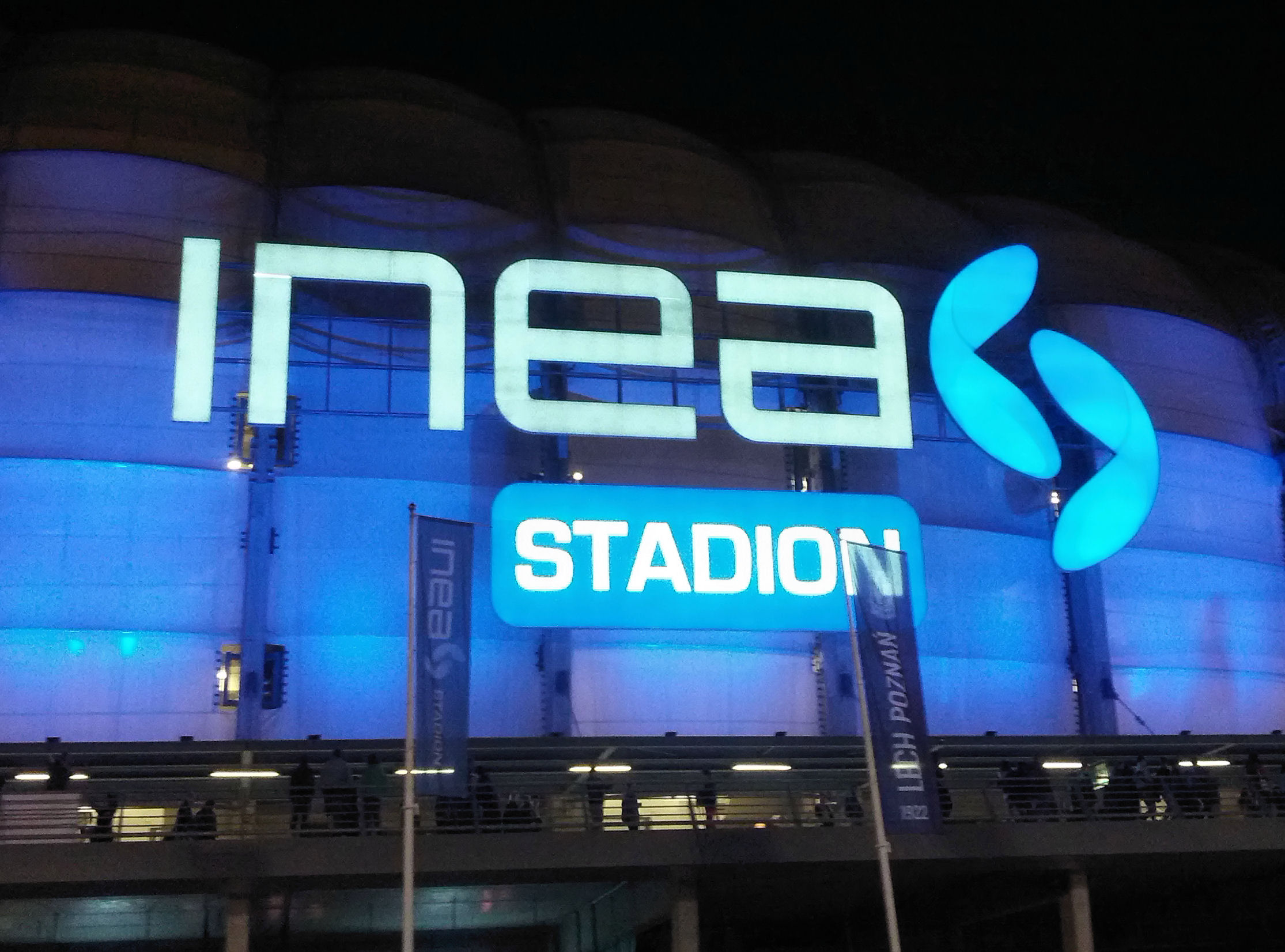
The stadium when it was called "INEA Stadion"

== Reconstruction ==
Process of complete reconstruction of the stadium began in mid-2003. The first stage of works was to complete the missing stand. The new North stand "completed" the characteristic U-shaped construction style of the stadium and increased its capacity by an additional 8,124 seats. The stand was opened in March 2004. Almost two years later, the roof construction covering all seats on north stand was built. At the same time, the stadium was equipped with an under-soil heating system. Also, floodlights mast modernization took place in the same year. In January 2006, construction of stands no. II (South stand) began in place of demolished old stadium's sections occupied by the Lech Poznań supporters section. This part of the stadium was traditionally called “Kocioł” (Polish “Boiler”). The construction of first two storeys of this 3-level stand were completed in February 2007, with work on the third one finalized in September 2008. This resulted in the increase in capacity of the entire stand to about 9,000 seats.

After Poland was chosen as a co-hosting Nation for Euro 2012 the city authorities decided to revise the architectural concept of the stadium and thus a larger facility was decided to be built. The stadium capacity increased to about 45,000 seats. According to a new project stands no. I and III (along sidelines) were built as two-level constructions. Both have capacity for 13,750 spectators. VIP lounges, media zone, locker rooms, referees rooms and club facilities are located on the stand no. I. Whole seats located on stand no. III are dedicated strictly for football fans. All places on the stadium are seated – folding stadium seats are installed in such a way as to maintain a minimum 12 cm clearance between each other.

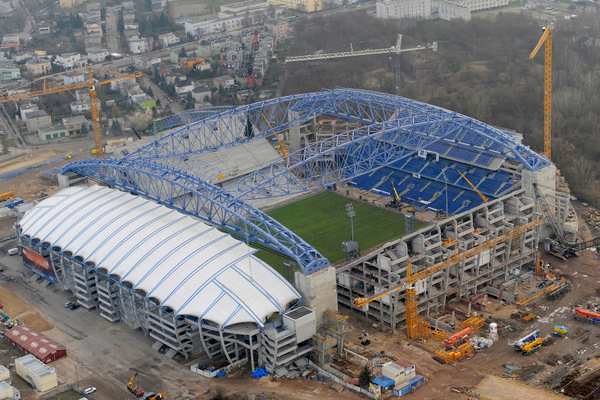
The stadium being renovated in 2009

Modernization and expansion project of the stadium was delivered by Modern Construction Systems. In comparison to the earlier architectural concepts, the last one changed the roof construction design. The concept introduced roof as a membrane in natural colors of silk. The whole membrane is divided into equal segments – each of them is 9 meters long and gives the impression of wavy-like shape. The roof forms a cohesive whole over stands I, II, and III. Part of the roof over the stand no. II is a movable structure, designed to ensure proper illumination of grass on some part of the pitch. Cubature of the stadium is 1,300,000 m^{2} and total area is 250,000 m^{2}. The original architectural concept of stadium modernization from 2002, was finally replaced by concept designed in 2008. Construction work based on this concept took place in years 2008–2012.

Work on the stands no. I and III started in October 2008 and was completed in September 2010. New model of folding seats was installed on all four stands. They are wider than previous models, so the capacity of the stadium was reduced to 41,609, but in 2012 it was increased to the current capacity, 42,837.

During reconstruction, it was decided to build steeper stands in order to promote spectator interaction with the players. However, a consequence of this solution is also poor grass growth on the football pitch because of sunlight hardly getting through. This makes it necessary for turf to be exchanged a few times a year. It is hoped that the frequency of replacement will drop after the field rehabilitation carried out in August/September 2011.

== Stands characteristic ==
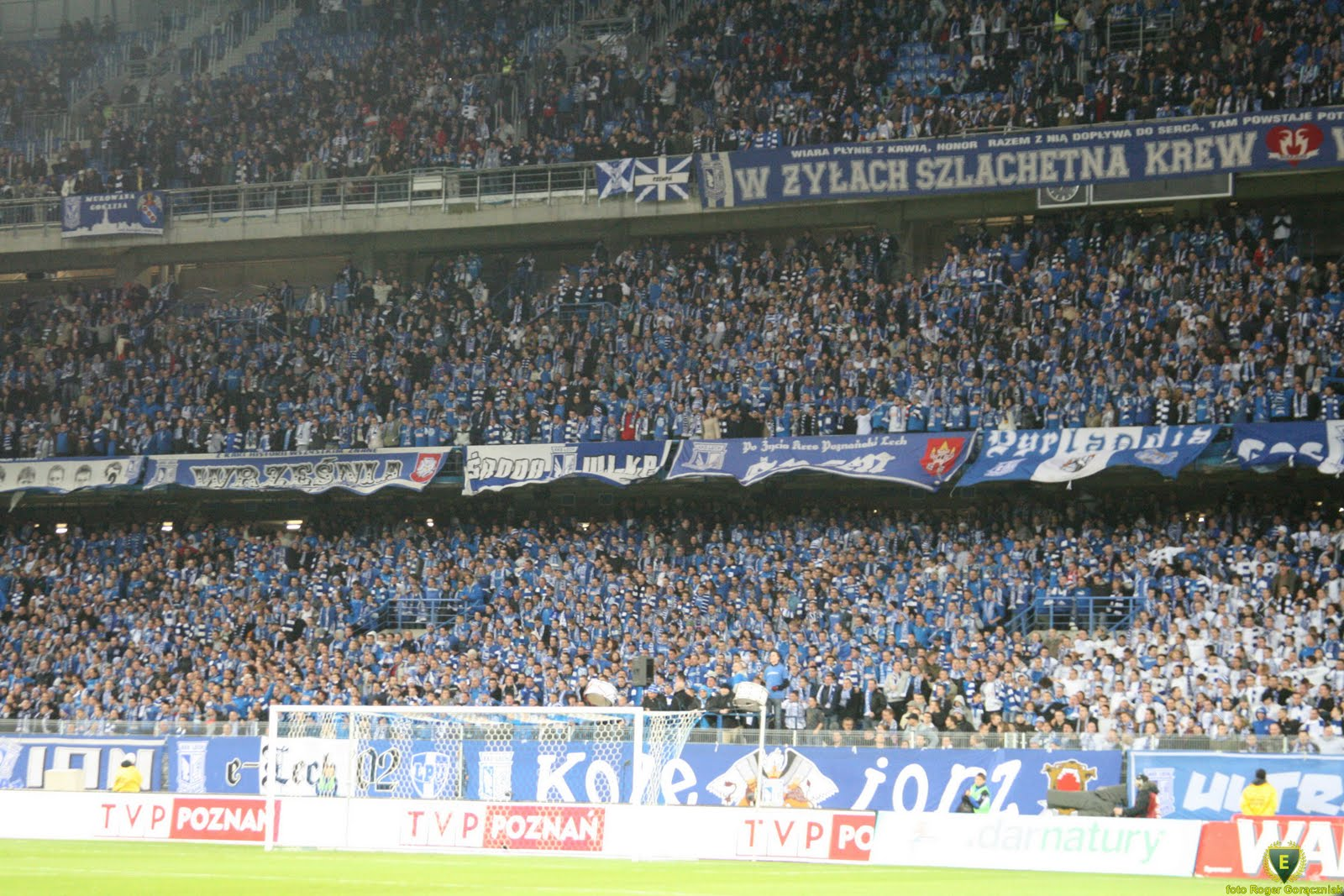
Lech Poznan fans during a match

- Stand no. I (length - 136.13 m / width - 58.64 m)

This is the main stand on the stadium. Facilities under the stands are designed for players (locker rooms, saunas, massage rooms etc.), press and special guests. Under the stand no. I there is also an underground parking for cars and buses The remaining storeys are dedicated for players, referees, fans and the press. Moreover, there are conference rooms, offices, storage and technical rooms located under the stand. Training grounds are located behind this stand.

- Stand no. II - known as Kocioł (The Cauldron) (length - 128.73 m / width - 48.35 m)

Stand no. II is located on the side of the historical fortification structure named Fort VIII Grolman. The stand is the only three-level stand on the stadium dedicated for spectators. Some rooms located in south-west corner of stand no. II are reserved for a future hotel complex. There are the most fanatic fans of Lech Poznań.

- Stand no. III (length - 136.13 m / width - 58.64 m)

East stand of the stadium is located on the side of Bułgarska street. This is second stand located behind sidelines. All five storeys with concession stands, toilets, and staircases are designed for spectators. Storage facilities, technical rooms, warehouse and staff rooms are located on lower levels on this stand. In addition, at the level + 3.30 two conference rooms with a capacity of 25 and 50 people are located.

- Stand no. IV (length - 189.00 m / width - 42.80 m)

North stand was built first, before revisions of stadium's architectural concept took place. This is the smallest stand on the stadium with all space and rooms dedicated for the spectators. The structure is composed of four storeys. At the level of + 6.60 there are seats for disabled persons.

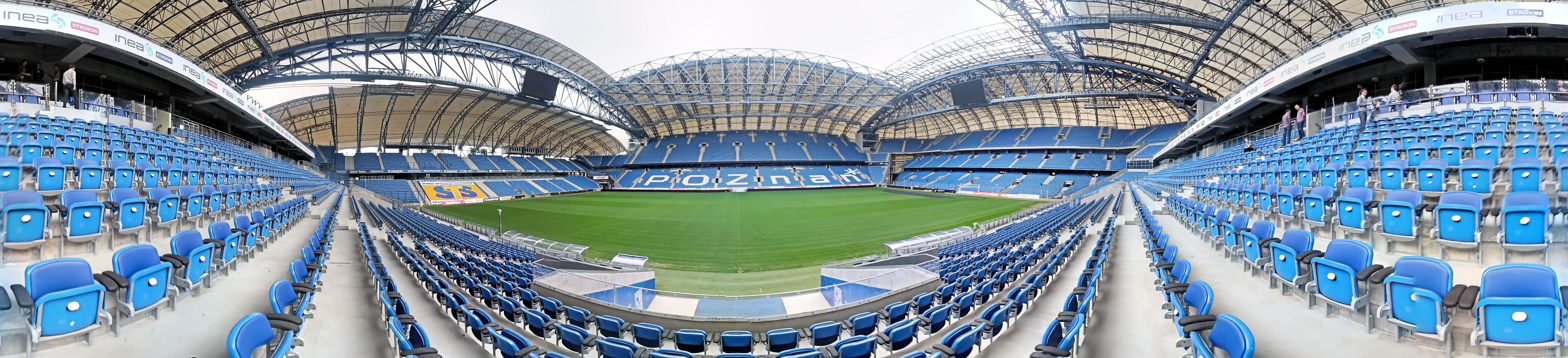
Panorama view of the Poznań Municipal Stadium in 2013

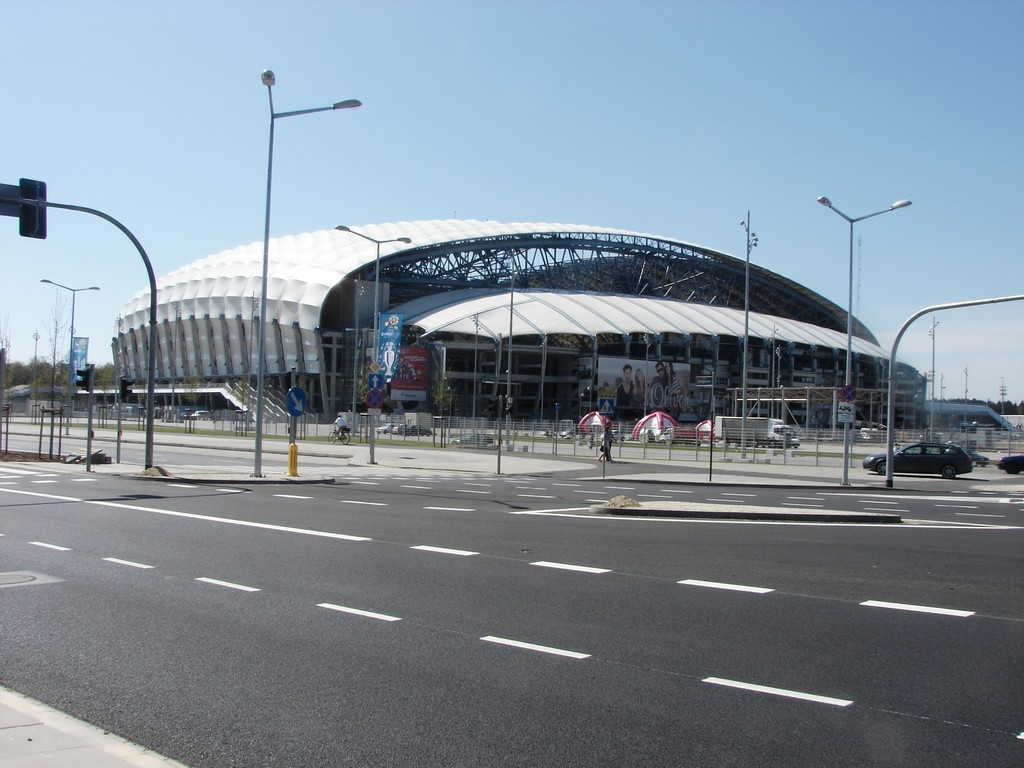
Stadium as seen from Bulgarska St.

== Poland national football team matches ==
Nr	Competition	Date	Opponent	Result	Attendance	Scorers for Poland
1	Friendly	17 November 2010	Ivory Coast	3–1	42,000	Robert Lewandowski (2), Ludovic Obraniak
2	Friendly	15 November 2011	Hungary	2–1	7,500	Paweł Brożek, Vilmos Vanczák (o.g.)
3	Friendly	19 November 2013	Republic of Ireland	0–0	31,100	
4	Friendly	26 March 2016	Serbia	1–0	38,271	Jakub Błaszczykowski
5	Friendly	8 June 2018	Chile	2–2	41,216	Robert Lewandowski, Piotr Zieliński
6	Friendly	8 June 2021	Iceland	2–2	19,614	Piotr Zieliński, Karol Świderski

== Euro 2012 matches ==
The stadium was one of the venues for the group stages of the UEFA Euro 2012 championships. Three Group C matches were played there: Croatia v. Republic of Ireland on 10 June, Croatia v. Italy on 14 June, and Republic of Ireland v. Italy on 18 June. (The other three matches in that group took place at the PGE Arena, Gdańsk).

Date	Time (CEST)	Team #1	Result	Team #2	Round	Attendance
10 June 2012	20:45	Republic of Ireland	1–3	Croatia	Group C	39,550
14 June 2012	18:00	Italy	1–1	Croatia	Group C	37,096
18 June 2012	20:45	Italy	2–0	Republic of Ireland	Group C	38,794

== See also ==
- Poznań-Ławica Airport
- Motorway A2 linked with Stadium
- Poznań Główny railway station
- List of football stadiums in Poland
- Lists of stadiums
