= Gefle IF =

Swedish football club

- Full name: Gefle Idrottsförening
- Nickname: Gif
- Founded: 5 December 1882; 143 years ago as Gefle SK
- Ground: Gavlevallen, Gävle
- Capacity: 6,500
- Chairman: Robert Strid
- Head coach: Rawez Lawan
- League: Ettan
- 2025: Ettan, 13th
- Website: www.gefleiffotboll.se
Home colours	Away colours	Third colours

Gefle Idrottsförening, also known simply as Gefle IF, Gefle (pronounced [ˈjɛ̌ːvlɛ], as if spelled Gävle), or locally Gif (pronounced [ˈɡɪfː]), also known as Gefle IF FF by the Swedish Football Association, are a Swedish professional football club based in Gävle. The club is affiliated with Gestriklands Fotbollförbund and play their home games at Gavlevallen since the 2015 season. The club colours are blue and white. Formed on 5 December 1882 as Gefle SK, the club have played fifteen seasons in Sweden's highest football league Allsvenskan, with the first season being 1933–34. The club is currently playing in Ettan Norra, the third tier of Swedish football.

== History ==
Gefle IF was originally formed as Gefle SK in December 1882 but changed the name to its current form only months after. The name "Gefle" is one of the old variations of spelling for the town Gävle which was used from the 1500s to the early 1900s. The multisports club mainly focused on winter sports during its early years, with rowing being their only summertime activity. In 1896 the club started having regular football training sessions under the guidance of an English accountant by the name of Robert Carrick. Born in England, he had grown up in Gävle but returned to his homeland for a few years as a student. There he had picked up the new sport which he brought back with him to Sweden and introduced at Gefle IF.

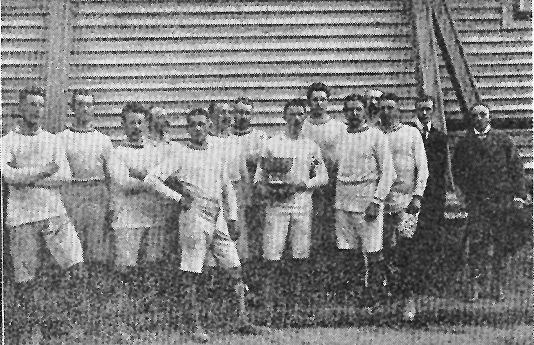
The Gefle IF team of 1902 with Robert Carrick holding the Rosenska Pokalen-trophy.

The club found early success at the turn of the century by winning one of the biggest swedish cups at the time, Rosenska Pokalen, three times. Due to high travel costs Gefle declined to participate in the other major swedish football tournament, Svenska Mästerskapet, during those years. Therefore, the clubs golden generation never got the chance to play against the nations other dominant team at the time, Örgryte IS from Gothenburg.

An ever-increasing number of football clubs were starting up in the early 1900s and Gefle were not able to maintain its dominant position among all the new competition. When the first swedish league Svenska Serien started in 1910 Gefle IF were not included and when they entered into the second tier of the league system in 1912–13 they finished last.

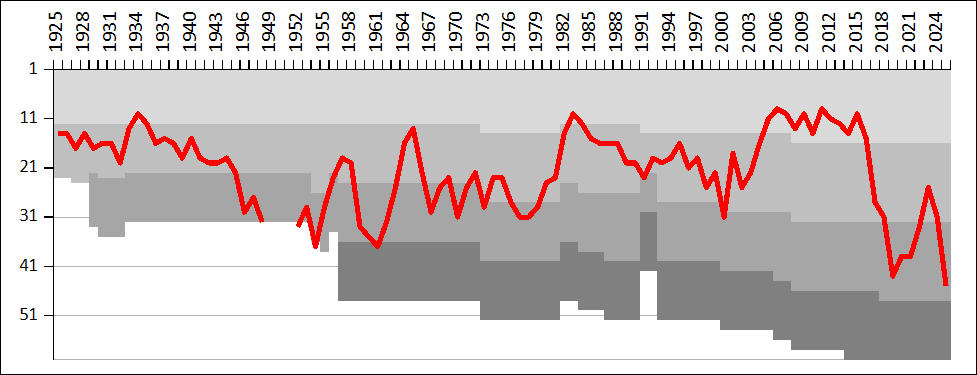
A chart showing the progress of Gefle IF through the swedish football league system. The different shades of gray represent league divisions.

During the rest of the 20th century the club mostly moved up and down between the second and third level of the Swedish football league system. They only managed two short lived stints at the top level Allsvenskan, one in the early 1930s and one in the early 1980s. Between the 1979 and 1981 season Gefle IF and Brynäs IF merged and played under the name Gefle IF/Brynäs, but the merger split up again in 1982. In 2004 manager Kenneth Rosén was finally able to bring the club back to the top division after finishing second in the 2004 Superettan. Rosén had missed part of the previous season due to illness and after the club was promoted he again had to be hospitalized and died soon after. Long-time club servant Per "Pelle" Olsson immediately stepped in and took over as manager during the off-season and managed to keep the club at the top level. Olsson would remain as the manager until 2014 when he was announced as Djurgårdens IF:s new manager.

== Supporters ==
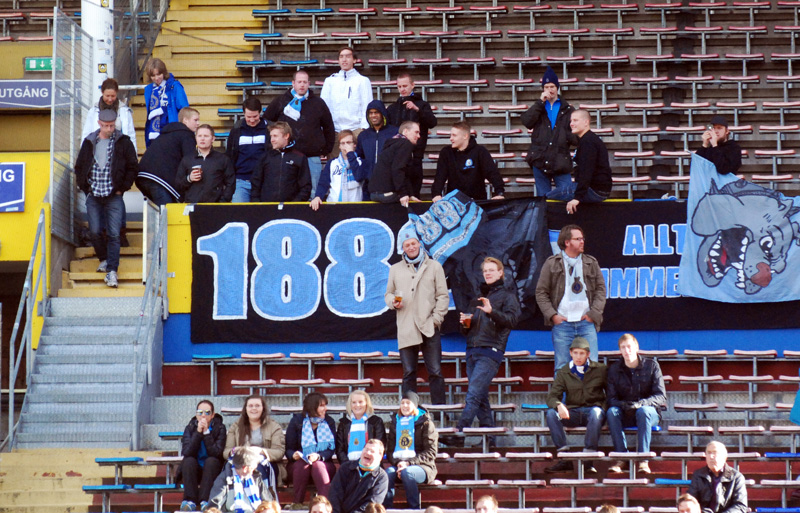
Gefle IF supporters during an away trip in 2012 to Råsunda Stadium where they played against AIK.

Due to their status as a second or third division club the Gefle supporters were late starters in creating an organised supporters club. After some fledgeling attempts in the mid-1990s when the interest in traveling to away games increased, the "Sky Blues" was finally founded in 2001 as the official supporter group.

In 2009 Gefle IF caused controversy among its fans by changing the sky blue home shirt to white, the color which the club played in during its first 80 years. This caused groups of fans to boycott the singing sections of the home stadium. Eventually before the start of the 2011 season a compromise was reached where they kept the white shirt for their home kit but brought back the sky blue as their new away kit. Further compromise was then reached for the 2015 Allsvenskan season when a new sky blue and white striped kit was launched, inspired by the Argentina national football team. A decision that satisfied both the fans and the club.

== Stadium ==
Gefle IF played at Strömvallen, built in 1923, for 92 years. On 30 May 2013 it was announced that the club had agreed with Gävle Municipality to build a new stadium in the Sätraåsen area of Gävle. The stadium, Gavlevallen, was ready for the 2015 season.

== European Cups history ==
Season	Competition	Round	Club	Home	Away	Aggregate
2006–07	UEFA Cup	First qualifying round	(Wales) Llanelli	1–2	0–0	1–2
2010–11	UEFA Europa League	First qualifying round	(Faroe Islands) NSÍ Runavík	2–1	2–0	4–1
2010–11	UEFA Europa League	Second qualifying round	(Georgia (country)) FC Dinamo Tbilisi	1–2	1–2	2–4
2013–14	UEFA Europa League	First qualifying round	(Estonia) Narva Trans	5–1	3–0	8–1
2013–14	UEFA Europa League	Second qualifying round	(Cyprus) Anorthosis	4–0	0–3	4–3
2013–14	UEFA Europa League	Third qualifying round	(Azerbaijan) Qarabağ FK	0–2	0–1	0–3

None of Gefle's appearances in European competition have been due to cup wins or their league positions (11th, 10th and 11th in the respective years). Instead they have qualified through the Fair Play initiative each time.

== Players ==
=== First-team squad ===
As of 3 September, 2026

Note: Flags indicate national team as defined under FIFA eligibility rules; some limited exceptions apply. Players may hold more than one non-FIFA nationality.

No.	Pos.	Nation	Player
1	GK	SWE	Max Croon (on loan from Djurgårdens)
2	DF	SWE	Eric Larsson
3	DF	SWE	Kevin Myrttinen
4	DF	SWE	Theodor Hansemon
5	DF	SWE	Dillan Ismail
6	MF	SWE	Isak Edman
8	MF	MLI	Mamadou Kouyaté
9	FW	SWE	Alen Zahirovic
10	MF	SWE	Malik Mokédé
11	MF	SWE	Lukas Vikgren
13	MF	SWE	Måns Berggren

No.	Pos.	Nation	Player
14	DF	SWE	Deniz Yaldir
15	DF	SWE	Alem Nezirevic
16	MF	SWE	Rasmus Nehrman
18	MF	SWE	Melker Spångberg
19	FW	USA	Adem Sipić (on loan from Nashville)
20	MF	JPN	Yukiya Sugita
21	FW	SWE	Leon Beronius
22	GK	SWE	William Hedvall
23	FW	FIN	Noah Lundström
24	DF	SWE	Kevin Persson
27	GK	SWE	Tim Markström
77	DF	GER	Semin Zulum

=== Out on loan ===
Note: Flags indicate national team as defined under FIFA eligibility rules; some limited exceptions apply. Players may hold more than one non-FIFA nationality.

No.	Pos.	Nation	Player
7	MF	SWE	Mohamad Ramadan (at IK Sätra until 30 November 2026)

== Managers ==
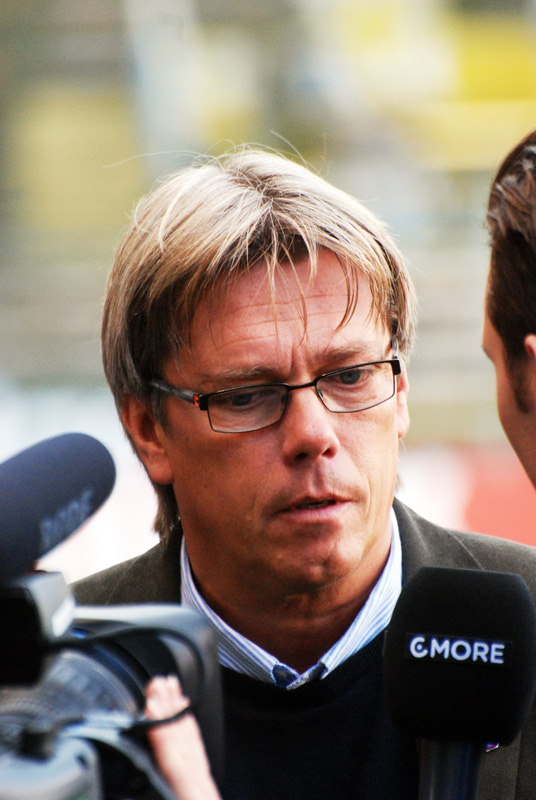
Pelle Olsson was in charge of Gefle IF for a large part of the past two decades.

- (England) Robert Carrick (1900–07)
- (Sweden) Sven Klang (1933–34)
- (Sweden) Erik Nilsson (1935)
- (Czech Republic) Václav Simon (1945–46)
- (Sweden) Erik Norin (1960)
- (Sweden) Matts Larsson (1961)
- (Sweden) Sven Bergsten (1963)
- (Sweden) Sigge Parling (1965)
- (Sweden) Jörgen Stark (1970–71)
- (Sweden) Lennart Söderberg (1972–75)
- (Germany) Peter Antoine (1976)
- (Sweden) Rune Karlsson (1977)
- (Sweden) Bo Andersson (1978–79)
- (Sweden) Leif Widén (1980–81)
- (Sweden) Stefan Lundin (1982–83)
- (Sweden) Björn Bolling (1984)
- (Sweden) Bo Andersson (1985–86)
- (Sweden) Lennart Söderberg (1987–89)
- (Poland) Marek Skurczyński (1990–92)
- (Sweden) Stefan Lundin (1992–96)
- (Sweden) Pelle Olsson (1996–02)
- (Sweden) Kenneth Rosén (2003–04)
- (Sweden) Pelle Olsson (2005–13)
- (Sweden) Roger Sandberg (2014–2016)
- (Sweden) Thomas Andersson (2016–2017)
- (Sweden) Poya Asbaghi (2017)
- (Sweden) Johan Mjällby (2018)
- (Sweden) Marcus Bengtsson (2018–2019)
- (Sweden) Mikael Bengtsson (2020–2024)
- (Sweden) Rawez Lawan (2025–present)

== Achievements ==
=== League ===
- Superettan:
  - Runners-up (1): 2004
- Division 1 Norra:
  - Winners (1): 2022
  - Runners-up (1): 1995

=== Cups ===
- Svenska Cupen:
  - Runners-up (1): 2006
- Rosenska Pokalen:
  - Winners (3): 1899, 1900, 1902
