= Kenneth Rosén =

Swedish football manager

Personal information
- Date of birth: 16 September 1951
- Place of birth: Sundsvall, Sweden
- Date of death: 27 December 2004 (aged 53)
- Place of death: Gävle, Sweden
- Position: Goalkeeper

Senior career*
Years	Team	Apps	(Gls)
- Skellefteå
- Örebro

Managerial career
- 1977: Laxå
- 1977-1978: Karlslund
- 1980-1982: Örebro
- 198: Falu
- 1984-1985: Brage
- 1986-1987: Halmstad
- 1988-1989: Kalmar AIK
- 1990: B68 Toftir
- 1990-1992: Skellefteå
- 1993-1994: Raufoss
- 1995–1996: Skjetten
- 1997–2000: Bryne
- 2001: Vålerenga (director of sports)
- 2001: L/F Hønefoss
- 2002: Kongsvinger
- 2003–2004: Gefle
- * Club domestic league appearances and goals

Kenneth Rosén (16 September 1951 – 27 December 2004) was a Swedish football goalkeeper and later manager.

He was born in Sundsvall and started his playing career in Skellefteå. He also played for Örebro SK.

He started his manager career in 1977 in Laxå IF. He then managed seven Swedish clubs as well as Faroese B68 Toftir before moving to Norway. After two season each in Raufoss and Skjetten he was hired as Bryne's manager ahead of the 1997 season. He guided the team to the 2000 Eliteserien.

Ahead of the 2001 season he was hired as director of sports in Vålerenga, but he was sacked already in June 2001. He took over as manager of L/F Hønefoss, but ahead of the 2002 season he was hired as manager of Kongsvinger. His final club was Gefle, where he died after two seasons as manager and leading the team from 2004 Superettan to 2005 Allsvenskan. He died of cancer at the hospital in Gävle.
