= Eljif Elmas =

Macedonian footballer (born 1999)

Eljif Elmas Ељиф Елмас
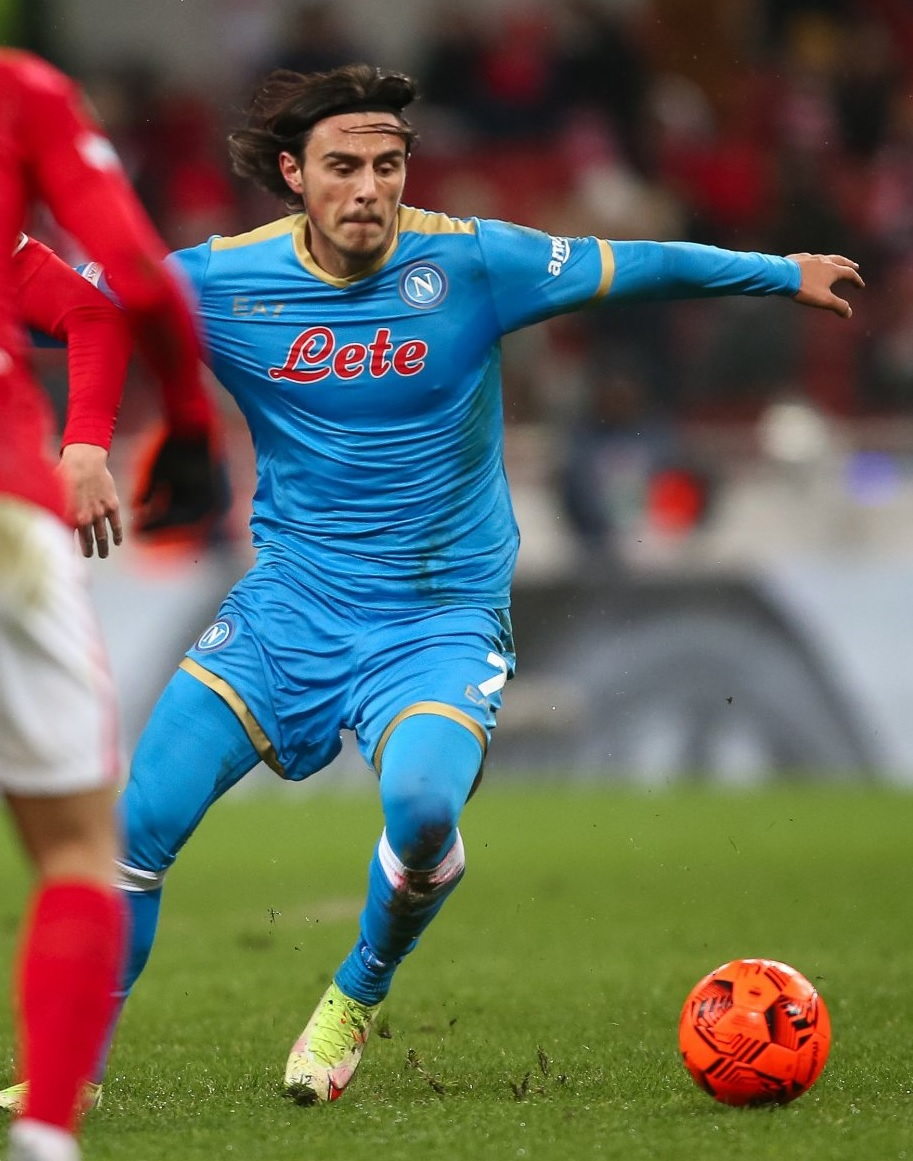
- Elmas playing for Napoli in 2021

Personal information
- Date of birth: 24 September 1999 (age 27)
- Place of birth: Skopje, Macedonia
- Height: 1.84 m (6 ft 0 in)
- Positions: Attacking midfielder; winger

Team information
- Current team: Atalanta (on loan from RB Leipzig)
- Number: 99

Youth career
- 2004–2013: FK Vardar
- 2013–2015: Rabotnički

Senior career*
| Years | Team | Apps | (Gls) |
| 2015–2017 | Rabotnički | 44 | (7) |
| 2017–2019 | Fenerbahçe | 34 | (4) |
| 2019–2024 | Napoli | 143 | (14) |
| 2024– | RB Leipzig | 16 | (0) |
| 2025 | → Torino (loan) | 13 | (4) |
| 2025–2026 | → Napoli (loan) | 33 | (1) |
| 2026– | → Atalanta (loan) | 10 | (2) |

International career^{‡}
| | Macedonia U17 | 2 | (0) |
| 2015–2018 | Macedonia U19 | 13 | (2) |
| 2016–2017 | Macedonia U21 | 9 | (1) |
| 2017– | North Macedonia | 85 | (13) |
- * Club domestic league appearances and goals as of 22:12, 22 November 2026 (UTC) ‡ National team caps and goals as of 23:55, 16 November 2026 (UTC)

Eljif Elmas (Macedonian: Ељиф Елмас, Turkish: Elif Elmas; born 24 September 1999) is a Macedonian professional footballer who plays as an attacking midfielder or wide midfielder for Serie A club Atalanta, on loan from Bundesliga club RB Leipzig. He also plays for the North Macedonia national team.

== Club career ==
=== Early career ===
Elmas started his career at FK Rabotnički in his native North Macedonia. After a stand-out season in which he scored six league goals and led Rabotnički to a third-place finish in the Macedonian First Football League in 2016–17, he joined Turkish giants Fenerbahçe on a deal until 2022, with Fenerbahçe paying the former €300,000 for his services. The attacking midfielder went on to score four goals in over 40 appearances for the Yellow Canaries in all competitions before moving to Italy in July 2019.

=== Napoli ===
On 24 July 2019, Serie A club Napoli announced the signing of Elmas from Fenerbahçe. The deal was worth a reported €16 million, which could rise to €19 million in total with bonuses – including a €1.5 million sell-on fee clause. He was disciplined by his new club after speaking to reporters while away on international duty in November 2019 for breaching a club media blackout.

Elmas scored his first Napoli goal on 3 February 2020 in a 4–2 victory against Sampdoria, helping the club securing its third win in a row in all competitions. On 19 December 2021, he scored the winning goal for Napoli in a narrow away victory against AC Milan, taking over second place in Serie A. Elmas went on to win the Scudetto with Napoli in 2023, the club's third title, and the first claimed outside of the Diego Maradona era.

=== RB Leipzig ===
On 27 December 2023, Bundesliga club RB Leipzig announced that Elmas would join the club on 1 January 2024, upon the opening of the winter transfer window, signing a four-and-a-half-year contract. The transfer fee paid by the Germans was reported as €23 million by German sports magazine Kicker.

==== Loan to Torino ====
On 30 January 2025, Elmas returned to Italy, joining Torino on loan with an option to buy.

==== Loan to Napoli ====
On 1 September 2025, Elmas returned to Napoli, this time on loan till the end of the 2025–26 season, with an option to buy for €16 million.

== International career ==
Elmas was born in Macedonia (now North Macedonia) to a family of Turkish descent. In July 2017, it was reported that then-coach of the Turkey national football team, Fatih Terim, had tried to call him up, but Elmas decided to represent his birth country.

Elmas was also included in the Macedonia U21 squad for the 2017 UEFA European Under-21 Championship in Poland, being the youngest footballer in the 23-man squad. On 11 June 2017, at the age of 17, Elmas debuted for the Macedonian senior squad in a FIFA World Cup qualifier against Spain as a half-time substitute for Ostoja Stjepanović.

On 31 March 2021, Elmas scored the winning goal for North Macedonia in a 2–1 away victory against Germany during the 2022 FIFA World Cup qualification. The same year in November 2021, Elmas scored a brace in a 3–1 victory against Iceland, helping the team secure a runners-up spot in Group J, leading North Macedonia to a World Cup play-off.

== Career statistics ==
=== Club ===
As of match played 22 November 2026

Appearances and goals by club, season and competition
| Club | Season | League | | | National cup (Note: Includes Turkish Cup, Coppa Italia, DFB-Pokal) | | Europe | | Other | | Total | |
| Club | Season | Division | Apps | Goals | Apps | Goals | Apps | Goals | Apps | Goals | Apps | Goals |
|---|---|---|---|---|---|---|---|---|---|---|---|---|
| Rabotnički | 2015–16 | Macedonian First League | 11 | 1 | 0 | 0 | 0 | 0 | — | | 11 | 1 |
| Rabotnički | 2016–17 | Macedonian First League | 33 | 6 | 0 | 0 | 2 (Note: Appearances in UEFA Europa League) | 1 | — | | 35 | 7 |
| Rabotnički | Total | | 44 | 7 | 0 | 0 | 2 | 1 | — | | 46 | 8 |
| Fenerbahçe | 2017–18 | Süper Lig | 5 | 0 | 2 | 0 | — | | — | | 7 | 0 |
| Fenerbahçe | 2018–19 | Süper Lig | 29 | 4 | 2 | 0 | 9 | 0 | — | | 40 | 4 |
| Fenerbahçe | Total | | 34 | 4 | 4 | 0 | 9 | 0 | — | | 47 | 4 |
| Napoli | 2019–20 | Serie A | 26 | 1 | 5 | 0 | 5 (Note: Appearances in UEFA Champions League) | 0 | — | | 36 | 1 |
| Napoli | 2020–21 | Serie A | 33 | 2 | 4 | 1 | 6 | 0 | 1 (Note: Appearance(s) in Supercoppa Italiana) | 0 | 44 | 3 |
| Napoli | 2021–22 | Serie A | 37 | 3 | 1 | 0 | 8 | 4 | — | | 46 | 7 |
| Napoli | 2022–23 | Serie A | 36 | 6 | 1 | 0 | 10 | 0 | — | | 47 | 6 |
| Napoli | 2023–24 | Serie A | 11 | 2 | 0 | 0 | 5 | 0 | 0 | 0 | 16 | 2 |
| Napoli | Total | | 143 | 14 | 11 | 1 | 34 | 4 | 1 | 0 | 189 | 19 |
| RB Leipzig | 2023–24 | Bundesliga | 14 | 0 | — | | 2 | 0 | — | | 16 | 0 |
| RB Leipzig | 2024–25 | Bundesliga | 2 | 0 | 1 | 0 | 3 | 0 | — | | 6 | 0 |
| RB Leipzig | Total | | 16 | 0 | 1 | 0 | 5 | 0 | — | | 22 | 0 |
| Torino (loan) | 2024–25 | Serie A | 13 | 4 | — | | — | | — | | 13 | 4 |
| Napoli (loan) | 2025–26 | Serie A | 33 | 1 | 2 | 0 | 7 | 0 | 2 | 0 | 44 | 1 |
| Atalanta (loan) | 2026–27 | Serie A | 10 | 2 | 0 | 0 | 3 (Note: Appearances in UEFA Conference League) | 1 | — | | 13 | 3 |
| Career total | | | 292 | 32 | 18 | 1 | 59 | 6 | 3 | 0 | 373 | 39 |

=== International ===
As of match played 16 November 2026

Appearances and goals by national team and year
| National team | Year | Apps | Goals |
|---|---|---|---|
North Macedonia (Note: North Macedonia was known as Macedonia until 2019)
| North Macedonia | 2017 | 3 | 0 |
| North Macedonia | 2018 | 5 | 0 |
| North Macedonia | 2019 | 10 | 4 |
| North Macedonia | 2020 | 4 | 0 |
| North Macedonia | 2021 | 15 | 5 |
| North Macedonia | 2022 | 9 | 0 |
| North Macedonia | 2023 | 10 | 3 |
| North Macedonia | 2024 | 9 | 1 |
| North Macedonia | 2025 | 10 | 0 |
| North Macedonia | 2026 | 10 | 0 |
| Total | | 85 | 13 |

As of match played 1 June 2026
Scores and results list North Macedonia's goal tally first, score column indicates score after each Elmas goal.

List of international goals scored by Eljif Elmas
| No. | Date | Venue | Cap | Opponent | Score | Result | Competition |
|---|---|---|---|---|---|---|---|
| 1 | 21 March 2019 | Toše Proeski Arena, Skopje, North Macedonia | 9 | Latvia | 2–0 | 3–1 | UEFA Euro 2020 qualification |
| 2 | 21 March 2019 | Toše Proeski Arena, Skopje, North Macedonia | 9 | Latvia | 3–1 | 3–1 | UEFA Euro 2020 qualification |
| 3 | 10 October 2019 | Toše Proeski Arena, Skopje, North Macedonia | 15 | Slovenia | 1–0 | 2–1 | UEFA Euro 2020 qualification |
| 4 | 10 October 2019 | Toše Proeski Arena, Skopje, North Macedonia | 15 | Slovenia | 2–0 | 2–1 | UEFA Euro 2020 qualification |
| 5 | 28 March 2021 | Toše Proeski Arena, Skopje, North Macedonia | 24 | Liechtenstein | 4–0 | 5–0 | 2022 FIFA World Cup qualification |
| 6 | 31 March 2021 | MSV-Arena, Duisburg, Germany | 25 | Germany | 2–1 | 2–1 | 2022 FIFA World Cup qualification |
| 7 | 1 June 2021 | Toše Proeski Arena, Skopje, North Macedonia | 26 | Slovenia | 1–0 | 1–1 | Friendly |
| 8 | 14 November 2021 | Toše Proeski Arena, Skopje, North Macedonia | 37 | Iceland | 2–1 | 3–1 | 2022 FIFA World Cup qualification |
| 9 | 14 November 2021 | Toše Proeski Arena, Skopje, North Macedonia | 37 | Iceland | 3–1 | 3–1 | 2022 FIFA World Cup qualification |
| 10 | 23 March 2023 | Toše Proeski Arena, Skopje, North Macedonia | 47 | Malta | 1–0 | 2–1 | UEFA Euro 2024 qualification |
| 11 | 16 June 2023 | Toše Proeski Arena, Skopje, North Macedonia | 49 | Ukraine | 2–0 | 2–3 | UEFA Euro 2024 qualification |
| 12 | 12 September 2023 | National Stadium, Ta' Qali, Malta | 52 | Malta | 1–0 | 2–0 | UEFA Euro 2024 qualification |
| 13 | 10 October 2024 | Skonto Stadium, Riga, Latvia | 63 | Latvia | 3–0 | 3–0 | 2024–25 UEFA Nations League C |

== Honours ==
Napoli

- Serie A: 2022–23
- Coppa Italia: 2019–20
- Supercoppa Italiana: 2025–26
