= Alem Nezirevic =

Swedish footballer (born 2004)

Personal information
- Date of birth: 27 February 2004 (age 22)
- Place of birth: Sweden
- Height: 1.83 m (6 ft 0 in)
- Position: Right-back

Team information
- Current team: Gefle IF
- Number: 15

Youth career
- Motala AIF
- 2023–2024: Inter Milan
- 2024: → Bologna (loan)

Senior career*
Years	Team	Apps	(Gls)
2020–2022	Motala AIF	25	(0)
2025–	Gefle IF	46	(3)
- * Club domestic league appearances and goals as of 16 November 2026

Alem Nezirevic (born 27 February 2004) is a Swedish professional footballer who plays as a right-back for Gefle IF.

== Early life ==
Nezirevic is a native of Motala, Sweden.

== Career ==
As a youth player, Nezirevic joined the youth academy of Italian Serie A side Inter Milan on 2023.

On 19 January 2024, he joined the youth academy of Italian Serie A side Bologna on a six-month loan, until the end of the season.

He returned to Sweden in 2025, signing for third division club Gefle IF.

== Style of play ==
Nezirevic mainly operates as a right back and is also capable of playing as a wide midfielder on the right side, he has been described as "capable of combining quality and quantity, he is... very modern all-round".

== Personal life ==
Nezirevic is of Bosnia and Herzegovina descent.
