= Marek Skurczyński =

Polish footballer (born 1951)

Personal information
- Date of birth: 21 August 1951 (age 75)
- Place of birth: Wałbrzych, Poland
- Height: 1.88 m (6 ft 2 in)
- Positions: Defender; midfielder; forward

Senior career*
Years	Team	Apps	(Gls)
1969–1978	Zagłębie Wałbrzych		
1978–1983	Lech Poznań	128	(26)
1983–1987	Trelleborgs FF		

Managerial career
- 1990–1992: Gefle
- * Club domestic league appearances and goals

Marek Skurczyński (born 21 August 1951) is a Polish former footballer.

== Honours ==
Lech Poznań

- Polish Cup: 1981–82
