= Alessandro Bianconi =

Italian footballer (born 1999)

Personal information
- Date of birth: 20 January 1999 (age 27)
- Place of birth: Bentivoglio, Italy
- Height: 1.93 m (6 ft 4 in)
- Position: Centre-back

Team information
- Current team: Ravenna
- Number: 44

Youth career
- –2018: Bologna

Senior career*
Years	Team	Apps	(Gls)
2017–2020	Bologna	0	(0)
2018–2019	→ Tuttocuoio (loan)	28	(2)
2019–2020	→ Como (loan)	2	(0)
2020–2021	Gozzano	33	(0)
2021–2023	Ancona	38	(2)
2023	→ Lecco (loan)	6	(0)
2023–2024	Lecco	23	(1)
2024–2025	Triestina	15	(0)
2025–	Ravenna	21	(1)

International career
2017	Italy U18	1	(0)
- * Club domestic league appearances and goals as of 30 April 2026

Alessandro Bianconi (born 20 January 1999) is an Italian footballer who plays as centre-back for Serie C Group B club Ravenna. (Note: Alessandro Bianconi at Soccerway)

== Club career ==
He was raised in the youth teams of Bologna and was first called up to the senior squad on 17 January 2017 for a Coppa Italia game against Inter.

For the 2018–19 season, he was loaned to Serie D club Tuttocuoio.

On 20 July 2019, he joined Serie C club Como on loan. He made his professional Serie C debut for Como on 5 October 2019 in a game against Giana Erminio. He substituted Alessio Iovine in the 76th minute.

On 31 January 2023, Bianconi joined Lecco on loan. On 14 July 2023, Bianconi moved to Lecco on a permanent contract. On 21 August 2024, his contract with Lecco was terminated by mutual consent.

On 4 October 2024, Bianconi signed with Triestina until the end of the season, with an option for the 2025–26 season.

== International career ==
He was first called up to represent his country on 12 April 2017 for the Under-18 squad friendly against Ukraine.
