= Stadio Rigamonti-Ceppi =

Multi-use stadium in Lecco, Italy

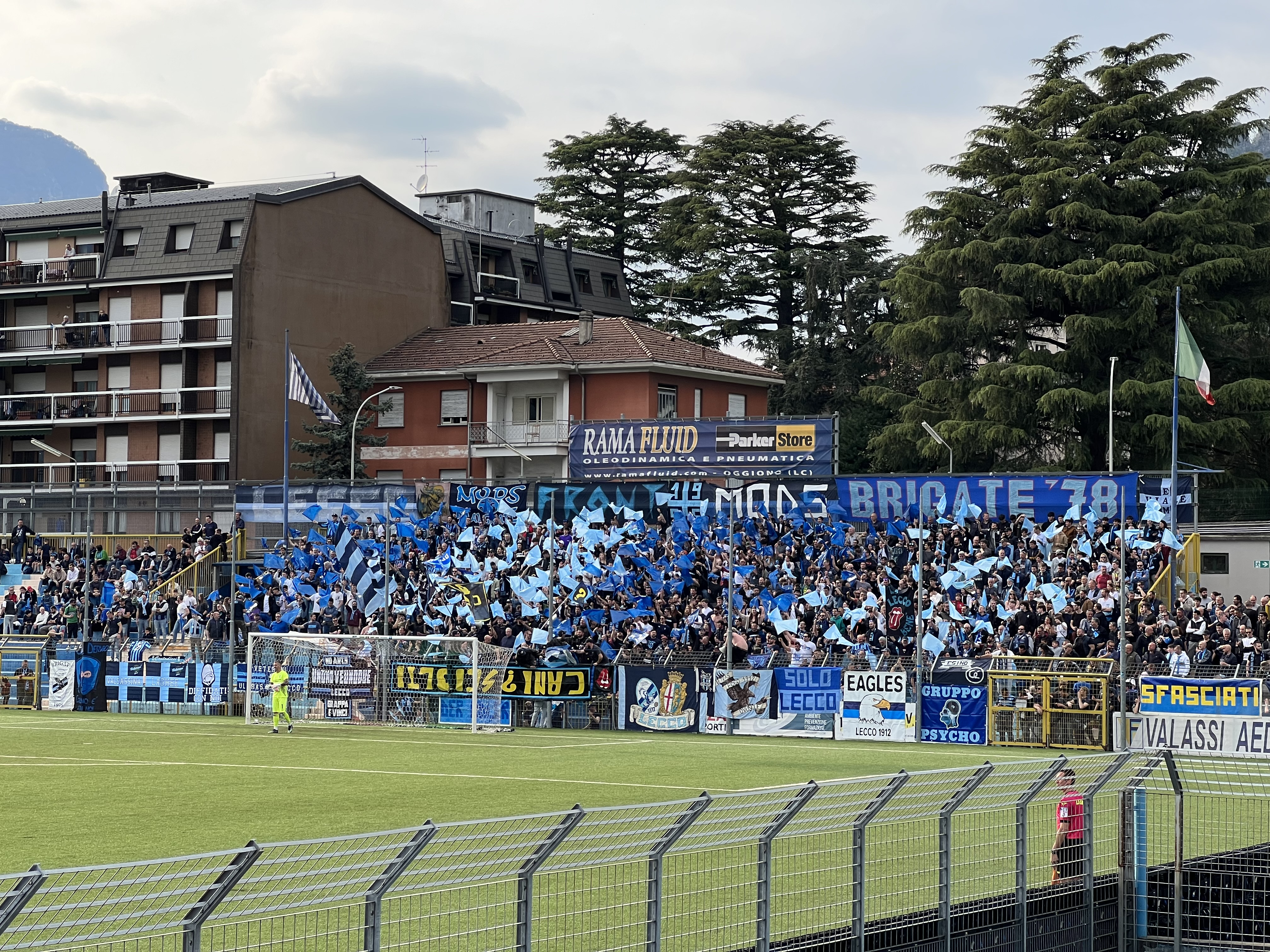
- Interactive map of Stadio Rigamonti-Ceppi
- Former names: Campo Sportivo (1922-1949); Stadio Mario Rigamonti (1949-1993)
- Location: Lecco, Italy
- Coordinates: 45°51′28″N 9°23′56″E
- Owner: Municipality of Lecco
- Capacity: 4,997
- Surface: Grass
- Field size: 105 x 65 m

Construction
- Groundbreaking: 1922
- Opened: 15 October 1922
- Renovated: 1936, 1956, 1960, 1984, 1987, 2007, 2023, 2024 closed =

Tenant
- Calcio Lecco 1912

Stadio Rigamonti-Ceppi is a multi-use stadium in Lecco, Italy. It is currently used mostly for football matches and is the home ground of Calcio Lecco 1912. The stadium holds 4,997 people.

== History ==
The stadium was named after Mario Rigamonti who died in the Superga air disaster, and Mario Ceppi, a former president of Calcio Lecco 1912.

On August 9, 2014, the stadium hosted the finals of the WFDF World Ultimate Club Championships, an ultimate frisbee event.
