= Eddie Salcedo =

Italian footballer (born 2001)

Personal information
- Full name: Eddie Anthony Salcedo Mora
- Date of birth: 1 October 2001 (age 25)
- Place of birth: Genoa, Italy
- Height: 1.78 m (5 ft 10 in)
- Position: Forward

Team information
- Current team: Rubin Kazan
- Number: 10

Youth career
- –2018: Genoa
- 2018–2019: → Inter (loan)

Senior career*
Years	Team	Apps	(Gls)
2017–2019	Genoa	2	(0)
2018–2019	→ Inter Milan (loan)	0	(0)
2019–2025	Inter Milan	0	(0)
2019–2021	→ Hellas Verona (loan)	38	(3)
2021–2022	→ Spezia (loan)	12	(0)
2022–2023	→ Bari (loan)	15	(2)
2023	→ Genoa (loan)	8	(2)
2023–2024	→ Eldense (loan)	11	(2)
2024	→ Lecco (loan)	10	(0)
2024–2025	→ OFI (loan)	24	(5)
2025–2026	OFI	26	(10)
2026–	Rubin Kazan	6	(1)

International career^{‡}
2018–2019	Italy U19	19	(5)
2021	Italy U20	1	(0)
2020–2021	Italy U21	2	(0)
- * Club domestic league appearances and goals as of 21 November 2026 ‡ National team caps and goals as of 3 September 2021

Eddie Anthony Salcedo Mora (born 1 October 2001) is an Italian professional footballer who plays as a forward for Russian Premier League club Rubin Kazan.

== Early life ==
Salcedo was born in Genoa, Italy to Colombian parents.

== Club career ==
Salcedo is a product of the Genoa youth academy. On 20 August 2017, at the age of 15, he made his debut with the senior team in Serie A in a 0–0 away draw against Sassuolo, coming on as an 81st-minute substitute for Andrey Galabinov.

On 16 July 2018, Salcedo joined Inter Milan on a season-long loan deal with an option to make the deal permanent. He played with Inter's U19 team in the Campionato Primavera 1 and the UEFA Youth League. The deal was made permanent on 19 June 2019 for €8 million.

In summer 2019 he joined the newly promoted Hellas Verona on loan. On 3 November 2019, he scored his first Serie A goal, in the home match won 2–1 against Brescia.

On 25 September 2020 he re-joined Verona on another season-long loan.

On 31 August 2021 he joined Spezia on a season-long loan.

On 1 September 2022, Salcedo moved to Bari on loan with an option to buy. On 31 January 2023, Bari mutually terminated Salcedo's loan deal with Inter Milan, and later on the same day he was loaned out to fellow Serie B club Genoa until the end of season, with an option to buy.

On 25 August 2023, Salcedo joined Spanish Segunda División club Eldense on loan with an option to buy. On 10 January 2024, Salcedo moved on a new loan to Serie B club Lecco, with an option to buy.

On 11 September 2024, Salcedo joined Greek Super League club OFI on a year-long loan. On 2 July 2025, Salcedo joined OFI on a permanent basis.

On 14 January 2026, OFI eliminated AEK in the quarter final of the Greek Cup with a 0-1 score. The only goal of the match was scored by Eddie Salcedo in the 80th minute of the game.

On 24 September 2026, Salcedo signed a contract with Rubin Kazan in Russia until June 2027, with an option to extend.

== International career ==
With the Italy U19 team he took part in the 2019 UEFA European Under-19 Championship.

He made his debut with the Italy U21 on 3 September 2020, in a friendly match won 2–1 against Slovenia.

== Career statistics ==
=== Club ===
As of match played 21 November 2026

Appearances and goals by club, season and competition
Club	Season	League			National cup (Note: Includes Coppa Italia, Copa del Rey, Greek Football Cup, Russian Cup)		Other		Total	
Club	Season	Division	Apps	Goals	Apps	Goals	Apps	Goals	Apps	Goals
Genoa	2017–18	Serie A	2	0	1	0	—		3	0
Inter Milan (loan)	2018–19	Serie A	0	0	0	0	—		0	0
Verona (loan)	2019–20	Serie A	17	1	0	0	—		17	1
Verona (loan)	2020–21	Serie A	21	2	2	1	—		23	3
Verona (loan)	Total		38	3	2	1	0	0	40	4
Spezia (loan)	2021–22	Serie A	12	0	0	0	—		12	0
Bari (loan)	2022–23	Serie B	15	2	1	0	—		16	2
Genoa (loan)	2022–23	Serie B	8	2	0	0	—		8	2
Genoa (loan)	Club total		10	2	1	0	0	0	11	2
Eldense (loan)	2023–24	Segunda División	11	2	1	0	—		12	2
Lecco (loan)	2023–24	Serie B	10	0	0	0	—		10	0
OFI (loan)	2024–25	Super League Greece	24	5	7	1	—		31	6
OFI	2025–26	Super League Greece	26	10	9	3	1 (Note: Appearance in Greek Super Cup)	0	36	13
OFI	Club total		50	15	16	4	1	0	67	19
Rubin Kazan	2026–27	Russian Premier League	6	1	2	0	—		8	1
Career total			152	25	23	5	1	0	176	30

== Honours ==
OFI

- Greek Cup: 2025–26
