= Matteo Battistini =

Italian footballer

Personal information
- Date of birth: 18 February 1994 (age 32)
- Place of birth: Como, Italy
- Height: 1.87 m (6 ft 2 in)
- Position: Centre back

Team information
- Current team: Reggiana
- Number: 13

Youth career
- Carrarese

Senior career*
| Years | Team | Apps | (Gls) |
| 2013–2017 | Carrarese | 55 | (0) |
| 2017–2018 | Pro Piacenza | 26 | (0) |
| 2018–2020 | Pro Patria | 50 | (2) |
| 2020–2021 | Piacenza | 35 | (0) |
| 2021–2026 | Lecco | 133 | (4) |
| 2024 | → Crotone (loan) | 9 | (0) |
| 2026– | Reggiana | 1 | (1) |
- * Club domestic league appearances and goals as of 24 August 2026

Matteo Battistini (born 18 February 1994) is an Italian professional footballer who plays as a centre back for Serie C Group B club Reggiana.

== Club career ==
Formed on Carrarese youth system, Battistini made his debut with the first team on 24 March 2013 against Gubbio.

On 4 July 2018, Battistini left Pro Piacenza and joined to Pro Patria.

On 21 August 2020 he joined to Serie C club Piacenza.

On 8 July 2021, the defender joined to Serie C club Lecco.

On 1 February 2024, Battistini was loaned by Crotone, with an option to buy.

== Personal life ==
Matteo is the son of former footballer Sergio Battistini.
