= Umberto Eusepi =

Italian footballer (born 1989)

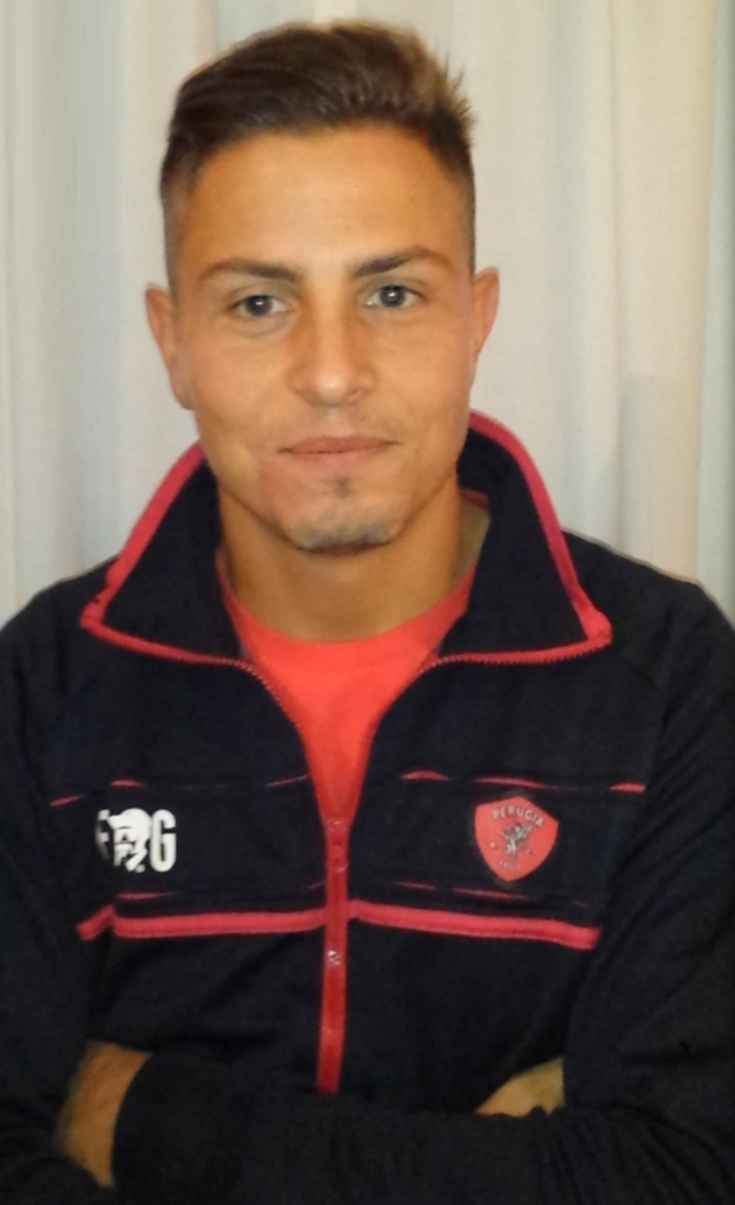
- Eusepi with Perugia in 2013

Personal information
- Full name: Umberto Eusepi
- Date of birth: 9 January 1989 (age 37)
- Place of birth: Tivoli, Italy
- Height: 1.81 m (5 ft 11 in)
- Position: Striker

Youth career
- 2001–2005: Lazio
- 2005–2006: Roma
- 2006–2008: Genoa

Senior career*
Years	Team	Apps	(Gls)
2008–2010	Genoa	0	(0)
2008–2009	→ Ancona (loan)	12	(1)
2009–2010	→ Reggiana (loan)	3	(0)
2010	→ Viareggio (loan)	13	(9)
2010–2014	Varese	16	(0)
2011	→ Pavia (loan)	15	(7)
2011–2012	→ Carpi (loan)	32	(8)
2013	→ Pro Vercelli (loan)	17	(1)
2013–2014	→ Perugia (loan)	31	(13)
2014–2015	Benevento	36	(18)
2015	Salernitana	10	(0)
2016–2020	Pisa	73	(15)
2017	→ Avellino (loan)	13	(3)
2018–2019	→ Novara (loan)	37	(10)
2019–2020	→ Alessandria (loan)	27	(12)
2020–2022	Alessandria	38	(11)
2021–2022	→ Juve Stabia (loan)	26	(8)
2022–2024	Lecco	19	(3)
2024	Monterosi	14	(7)
2024–2026	Sambenedettese	64	(24)

International career
2007	Italy U-18	1	(1)
2007–2008	Italy U-19	7	(1)
2008–2009	Italy U-20	6	(1)
- * Club domestic league appearances and goals as of 30 April 2026

Umberto Eusepi (born 9 January 1989) is an Italian professional footballer who plays as a striker.

== Club career ==
In summer 2010 Genoa sold Eusepi to Varese in a co-ownership deal for a peppercorn fee of €500.

On 6 August 2019, he joined Alessandria on loan. On 1 September 2020, he moved to Alessandria on a permanent basis. On 31 August 2021, he was loaned to Juve Stabia.

On 27 August 2022, Eusepi signed a two-year contract with Lecco.

On 1 February 2024, Eusepi moved to Monterosi.

== International career ==
He represented Italy at the 2008 UEFA European Under-19 Football Championship, where they came second, and at the 2009 FIFA U-20 World Cup.
