= Francesco Ardizzone =

Italian footballer (born 1992)

Personal information
- Date of birth: 17 February 1992 (age 34)
- Place of birth: Palermo, Italy
- Height: 1.81 m (5 ft 11 in)
- Position: Midfielder

Team information
- Current team: Marsala

Youth career
- Calcio Sicilia
- 2008–2011: Palermo

Senior career*
Years	Team	Apps	(Gls)
2010–2011	Palermo	0	(0)
2011–2013	Reggiana	50	(4)
2013–2017	Pro Vercelli	81	(5)
2017–2020	Virtus Entella	67	(4)
2020–2022	Cesena	59	(6)
2022–2023	Turris	9	(0)
2023	→ Lecco (loan)	8	(0)
2023–2024	Lecco	0	(0)
2024	→ Monopoli (loan)	13	(1)
2024	Taranto	6	(1)
2024–2026	Guidonia	12	(0)
2026–	Marsala		

International career
2011	Italy U19	5	(0)
2011–2012	Italy U20	5	(0)
- * Club domestic league appearances and goals as of 26 April 2026

Francesco Ardizzone (born 17 February 1992) is an Italian footballer who plays as a midfielder for Eccellenza club Marsala.

== Club career ==
Born in Palermo, Sicily, Ardizzone started his professional career at U.S. Città di Palermo. He was a member of the reserve from 2009 to 2011. Ardizzone made his debut in the last group stage match of 2010–11 UEFA Europa League on 15 December 2010.

=== Reggiana ===
On 1 July 2011, Ardizzone left for Italian third division club Reggiana along with Adriano Siragusa, as part of the deal that Gianluca Di Chiara moved to Palermo. Both clubs retained 50% registration rights of Ardizzone and Di Chiara. Half of the "card" of Di Chiara was valued for €140,000 at that time.

Ardizzone made 21 appearances in 2011–12 Lega Pro Prima Divisione. In June 2012, Reggiana acquired Ardizzone outright.

=== Pro Vercelli ===
On 29 August 2013, Ardizzone was sold to F.C. Pro Vercelli 1892 in another co-ownership deal for a peppercorn of €500. In June 2014 the co-ownership of Ardizzone and Mattia Bani were renewed.

=== Cesena ===
On 17 January 2020, he signed a 1.5-year contract with Serie C club Cesena.

=== Turris ===
On 19 July 2022, Ardizzone moved to Turris on a three-year contract.

=== Lecco ===
On 10 January 2023, Ardizzone was loaned by Lecco. The signing was made permanent in the summer of 2023, however, Ardizzone made no appearances for Lecco in the first half of the 2023–24 season after Lecco was promoted to Serie B.

On 1 February 2024, Ardizzone was loaned by Monopoli.

=== Taranto ===
On 29 August 2024, Ardizzone signed a one-year contract with Taranto.

== International career ==
Ardizzone was capped 3 times in friendlies and 2 times in 2011 UEFA European Under-19 Football Championship elite qualification for Azzurrini in the 2010–11 season. In the 2011–12 season, he was promoted to Italy U20 team. He played 3 times in 2011–12 Four Nations Tournament and two additional friendlies against Macedonia and Denmark.

== Personal life ==
On 29 January 2021 he tested positive for COVID-19.
