= Luca Giudici =

Italian footballer (born 1992)

Personal information
- Date of birth: 10 March 1992 (age 34)
- Place of birth: Erba, Italy
- Height: 1.80 m (5 ft 11 in)
- Position: Left winger

Team information
- Current team: Pro Patria
- Number: 27

Youth career
- 2000–2011: NibionnOggiono

Senior career*
Years	Team	Apps	(Gls)
2011–2017	Caronnese	193	(41)
2017–2020	Monza	50	(12)
2019	→ Giana Erminio (loan)	12	(0)
2019–2020	→ Lecco (loan)	23	(1)
2020–2024	Lecco	87	(9)
2021	→ Carrarese (loan)	10	(1)
2024–2025	Feralpisalò	23	(1)
2025–	Pro Patria	28	(2)
- * Club domestic league appearances and goals as of 30 April 2026

Luca Giudici (born 10 March 1992) is an Italian professional footballer who plays as a left winger for Serie D club Pro Patria.

== Club career ==
On 31 January 2019, he joined Giana Erminio on loan from Monza. On 9 July 2019, he moved to Lecco on loan.

On 6 July 2020, he returned to Lecco on a permanent basis. On 1 February 2021, he joined Carrarese on loan.

On 31 January 2024, Giudici signed a contract with Feralpisalò until 30 June 2025.
