= Mattia Tordini =

Italian footballer

Personal information
- Date of birth: 22 June 2002 (age 24)
- Place of birth: Novara, Italy
- Height: 1.71 m (5 ft 7 in)
- Position: Forward

Team information
- Current team: Crotone
- Number: 18

Youth career
- –2020: Inter Milan
- 2017–2018: → Novara (loan)
- 2018–2020: → Torino (loan)

Senior career*
Years	Team	Apps	(Gls)
2020–2021	Novara	8	(0)
2021–2026	Lecco	61	(8)
2024	→ Padova (loan)	12	(0)
2025	→ Messina (loan)	12	(1)
2026	Alcione	14	(0)
2026–	Crotone	1	(0)
- * Club domestic league appearances and goals as of 24 August 2026

Mattia Tordini (born 22 June 2002) is an Italian professional footballer who plays as a forward for Serie C Group C club Crotone.

== Club career ==
Born in Novara, Tordini was formed on Inter Milan, Novara and Torino youth system. He joined permanently to Novara, and made his senior debut on 4 October 2020 against Lucchese for Serie C.

On 11 August 2021, Tordini signed for Lecco.

On 2 January 2024, he moved on loan to Padova, with an option to buy.
