= Doudou Mangni =

Italian footballer (born 1993)

Personal information
- Full name: Doudou Ursul Tanguy Junior Mangni
- Date of birth: 20 March 1993 (age 33)
- Place of birth: Rome, Italy
- Height: 1.76 m (5 ft 9 in)
- Position: Striker

Youth career
- Atalanta

Senior career*
Years	Team	Apps	(Gls)
2013–2018	Atalanta	0	(0)
2013–2014	→ Modena (loan)	18	(5)
2014–2015	→ Latina (loan)	22	(3)
2015	→ Şanlıurfaspor (loan)	5	(0)
2016	→ Ascoli (loan)	6	(0)
2016–2017	→ Olhanense (loan)	23	(3)
2018	→ Monopoli (loan)	13	(3)
2018–2019	Monopoli	32	(11)
2019	Atalanta	0	(0)
2019–2021	Catanzaro	9	(0)
2020	→ Gozzano (loan)	3	(0)
2020–2021	→ Lecco (loan)	32	(5)
2021–2022	Gubbio	31	(4)
2022–2025	Lecco	30	(3)
2024	→ Alessandria (loan)	7	(0)
- * Club domestic league appearances and goals as of 25 April 2025

Doudou Ursul Tanguy Junior Mangni (born 20 March 1993) is an Italian professional footballer who plays as a striker.

== Club career ==
On 17 July 2014, Doudou went on loan to the Serie B outfit Latina Calcio along with his teammate Alberto Almici. He formerly had a loan spell at Serie B side Modena where he scored 5 goals in 18 appearances in the 2013–14 season.

After finishing the 2017–18 season on loan at Monopoli, he signed a 3-year contract with Monopoli on 12 July 2018. Atalanta held the buy-back option which they exercised at the end of the 2018–19 season. On 5 July 2019, he transferred to Catanzaro and signed a 3-year contract. Atalanta again holds an option to buy back his rights at the end of the 3-year deal.

On 31 January 2020, he joined Gozzano on loan. On 13 August 2020, he moved on loan to Lecco.

On 8 August 2021, he signed with Gubbio.

On 8 August 2022, Mangni returned to Lecco on a two-year contract. On 4 January 2024, Mangni moved on loan to Alessandria.
