= Lorenzo Pinzauti =

Italian footballer (born 1994)

Personal information
- Date of birth: 9 September 1994 (age 32)
- Place of birth: Fiesole, Italy
- Height: 1.81 m (5 ft 11 in)
- Position: Forward

Team information
- Current team: Pistoiese
- Number: 30

Senior career*
Years	Team	Apps	(Gls)
2014–2017	Jolly Montemurlo	90	(26)
2017	Tuttocuoio	12	(2)
2017–2019	Pontedera	66	(14)
2019–2021	Teramo	33	(4)
2019–2020	→ Novara (loan)	11	(0)
2021–2022	Pistoiese	34	(5)
2022–2024	Lecco	37	(7)
2024	→ Renate (loan)	13	(0)
2024–	Pistoiese	9	(1)
- * Club domestic league appearances and goals as of 17 November 2024

Lorenzo Pinzauti (born 9 September 1994) is an Italian professional footballer who plays as a forward for Serie D club Pistoiese.

== Career ==
Born in Fiesole, Pinzauti started his career in Jolly Montemurlo on Serie D. He played four seasons in Serie D.

On 31 January 2017, he signed with Serie C club Tuttocuoio. He made his professional debut on 19 February against Carrarese.

For the 2017–18 season, he joined to Pontedera in Serie C, he played two years in the club.

On 17 July 2019, he signed with Teramo. He was loaned to Novara on 30 August 2019.

On 17 August 2021, he moved to Pistoiese.

On 8 July 2022, Pinzauti joined Lecco on a two-year contract. He contributed to Lecco's promotion to Serie B and made his debut in the second tier in the summer of 2023. On 18 January 2024, he moved on loan to Renate. His Lecco contract was terminated on 30 August 2024.
