= Corentin Louakima =

French footballer (born 2003)

Personal information
- Full name: Corentin Yanis Louakima
- Date of birth: 28 February 2003 (age 23)
- Place of birth: Carrières-sous-Poissy, France
- Height: 1.83 m (6 ft 0 in)
- Position: Right-back

Team information
- Current team: Real Unión
- Number: 23

Youth career
- –2020: Paris Saint-Germain
- 2020–2024: Roma

Senior career*
Years	Team	Apps	(Gls)
2024–2025	Lecco	10	(0)
2025–	Real Unión	23	(4)

International career^{‡}
2018	France U16	5	(0)
- * Club domestic league appearances and goals as of 14 May 2026 ‡ National team caps and goals as of 3 November 2018

Corentin Yanis Louakima (born 28 February 2003) is a French footballer who plays as a right-back for Spanish Segunda Federación club Real Unión.

== Early life ==
Louakima regarded French international Blaise Matuidi as his football idol.

== Career ==
On 10 January 2024, Louakima signed for Italian side Lecco. On 24 January 2025, Louakima's contract with Lecco was mutually terminated.

== Style of play ==
Louakima mainly operated as a defender and is known for his speed.

== Personal life ==
Louakima is of Congolese descent.
