= Eyob Zambataro =

Ethiopian footballer (born 1998)

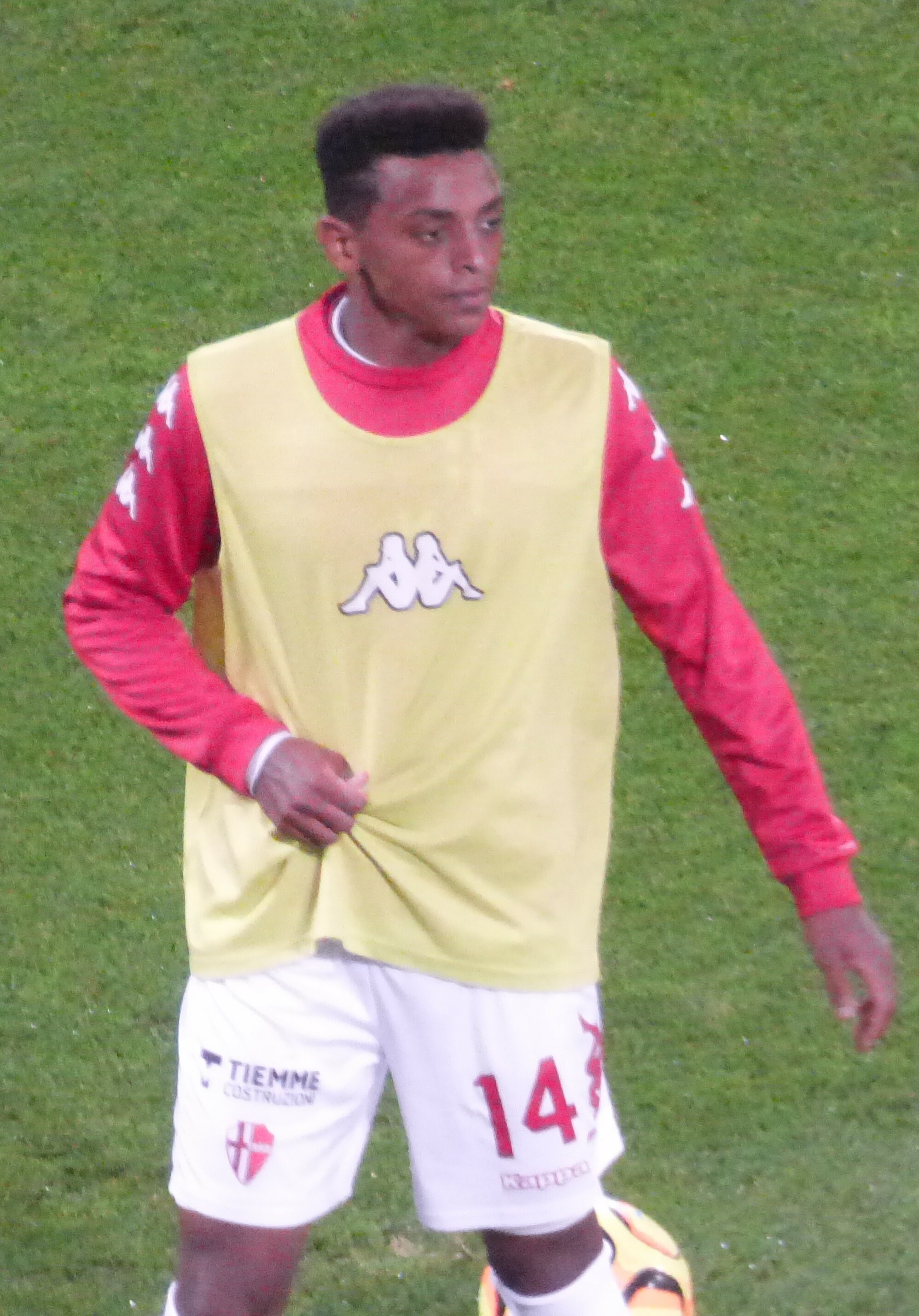
- Zambataro in 2024

Personal information
- Date of birth: 18 August 1998 (age 28)
- Place of birth: Addis Ababa, Ethiopia
- Height: 1.77 m (5 ft 10 in)
- Position: Defender

Team information
- Current team: Novara
- Number: 23

Youth career
- Ascot Triante
- San Fruttuoso
- 2009–2017: Atalanta

Senior career*
Years	Team	Apps	(Gls)
2017–2022	Atalanta	0	(0)
2017–2019	→ Padova (loan)	21	(0)
2020	→ Ravenna (loan)	10	(0)
2020–2021	→ Monopoli (loan)	32	(5)
2021–2022	→ Lecco (loan)	22	(1)
2022–2024	Lecco	37	(3)
2024–2026	Torres	68	(2)
2026–	Novara	1	(0)
- * Club domestic league appearances and goals as of 22 August 2026

Eyob Zambataro (born 18 August 1998) is an Ethiopian professional footballer who plays as a defender for Serie C Group A club Novara.

== Club career ==
Zambataro made his Serie C debut for Padova on 25 November 2017 in a game against AlbinoLeffe.

On 22 December 2019, he joined Serie C club Ravenna on loan until the end of the 2019–20 season.

On 25 August 2020 he moved to Monopoli.

On 10 August 2021 he was loaned to Serie C club Lecco. On 27 July 2022, Zambataro returned to Lecco on a permanent basis with a two-year contract.

On 5 January 2024, Zambataro signed with Torres.

== Personal life ==
Born in Addis Ababa, Ethiopia, he became an orphan in his early years, being housed in an orphanage together with his younger brother Akililu, who also had a short-lived football career as a goalkeeper. In 2007, both brothers were adopted by an Italian family from Monza.
