= 2020–21 Genoa CFC season =

Genoa
2020–21 season
- Chairman: Enrico Preziosi
- Head coach: Rolando Maran (until 21 December); Davide Ballardini (from 21 December)
- Stadium: Stadio Luigi Ferraris
- Serie A: 11th
- Coppa Italia: Round of 16
- Top goalscorer: League: Mattia Destro (11); All: Gianluca Scamacca (12)
Home colours	Away colours	Third colours

The 2020–21 Genoa C.F.C. season was the club's 128th season in existence and its 14th consecutive season in the top flight of Italian football. In addition to the domestic league, Genoa participated in the Coppa Italia. The season covered the period from 3 August 2020 to 30 June 2021.

== Players ==
=== First-team squad ===
As of 31 January 2021

Note: Flags indicate national team as defined under FIFA eligibility rules; some limited exceptions apply. Players may hold more than one non-FIFA nationality.

No.	Pos.	Nation	Player
1	GK	ITA	Mattia Perin (3rd captain, on loan from Juventus)
2	DF	COL	Cristián Zapata
4	DF	ITA	Domenico Criscito (captain)
5	DF	ITA	Edoardo Goldaniga (on loan from Sassuolo)
9	FW	ITA	Gianluca Scamacca (on loan from Sassuolo)
11	MF	SUI	Valon Behrami
14	DF	ITA	Davide Biraschi (vice-captain)
16	MF	SLO	Miha Zajc (on loan from Fenerbahçe)
17	MF	ITA	Manolo Portanova
18	DF	ITA	Paolo Ghiglione
19	FW	MKD	Goran Pandev
20	MF	NED	Kevin Strootman (on loan from Marseille)
21	MF	SRB	Ivan Radovanović
22	GK	ITA	Federico Marchetti
23	FW	ITA	Mattia Destro

No.	Pos.	Nation	Player
24	MF	ITA	Filippo Melegoni (on loan from Atalanta)
25	DF	CMR	Jérôme Onguéné (on loan from Red Bull Salzburg)
29	MF	ITA	Francesco Cassata
30	FW	ITA	Giuseppe Caso
32	GK	ITA	Alberto Paleari (on loan from Cittadella)
37	FW	CRO	Marko Pjaca (on loan from Juventus)
38	GK	CZE	Lukáš Zima
47	MF	CRO	Milan Badelj
55	DF	ITA	Andrea Masiello
61	FW	UZB	Eldor Shomurodov
65	MF	ITA	Nicolò Rovella (on loan from Juventus)
77	DF	ITA	Davide Zappacosta (on loan from Chelsea)
88	DF	ITA	Luca Pellegrini (on loan from Juventus)
89	MF	FRA	Steeve-Mike Eboa Ebongue
99	MF	GER	Lennart Czyborra (on loan from Atalanta)

=== On loan ===
As of 1 February 2021

Note: Flags indicate national team as defined under FIFA eligibility rules; some limited exceptions apply. Players may hold more than one non-FIFA nationality.

No.	Pos.	Nation	Player
—	GK	BRA	Jandrei (at Athletico Paranaense until 30 June 2021)
—	GK	SLO	Rok Vodišek (at Triglav Kranj until 30 June 2021)
—	DF	ITA	Mattia Bani (at Parma until 30 June 2021)
—	DF	ITA	Giorgio Altare (at Olbia until 30 June 2021)
—	DF	ITA	Antonio Candela (at Pergolettese until 30 June 2021)
—	DF	ITA	Luigi Carillo (at Casertana until 30 June 2021)
—	DF	ARG	Marcos Curado (at Frosinone until 30 June 2021)
—	DF	POL	Paweł Jaroszyński (at Salernitana until 30 June 2021)
—	DF	GAM	Fallou Njie (at Skënderbeu Korce until 30 June 2021)
—	DF	ITA	Enrico Nespoli (at Savoia until 30 June 2021)
—	DF	ITA	Leonardo Raggio (at Lecco until 30 June 2021)
—	DF	ITA	Nicholas Rizzo (at Feralpisalò until 30 June 2021)
—	DF	ITA	Federico Valietti (at Carrarese until 30 June 2021)
—	MF	COL	Kevin Agudelo (at Spezia until 30 June 2021)
—	MF	ITA	Andrea Cambiaso (at Empoli until 30 June 2021)
—	MF	ITA	Luca Chierico (at Reggina until 30 June 2021)
—	MF	DEN	Lukas Lerager (at Copenhagen until 30 June 2021)

No.	Pos.	Nation	Player
—	MF	ITA	Vittorio Parigini (at Ascoli until 30 June 2021)
—	MF	POL	Filip Jagiełło (at Brescia until 30 June 2021)
—	MF	ITA	Patrizio Masini (at Lecco until 30 June 2021)
—	MF	ROU	Claudiu Micovschi (at Reggina until 30 June 2021)
—	MF	ITA	Stefano Sturaro (at Hellas Verona until 30 June 2021)
—	MF	ITA	Mattia Zennaro (at Lucchese until 30 June 2021)
—	FW	ESP	Raúl Asencio (at SPAL until 30 June 2021)
—	FW	ITA	Flavio Bianchi (at Lucchese until 30 June 2021)
—	FW	ITA	Giacomo Calò (at Pordenone until 30 June 2021)
—	FW	ITA	Davide Castelli (at Pro Patria until 30 June 2021)
—	FW	FRA	Gabriel Charpentier (at Ascoli until 30 June 2021)
—	FW	ITA	Riccardo Correnti (at Savoia until 30 June 2021)
—	FW	ITA	Nicola Dalmonte (at Vicenza until 30 June 2021)
—	FW	LTU	Augustinas Klimavičius (at Empoli until 30 June 2021)
—	FW	ITA	Andrea Favilli (at Hellas Verona until 30 June 2021)
—	FW	ARG	Claudio Spinelli (at FC Koper until 30 June 2021)
—	FW	ITA	Elia Petrelli (at Reggina until 30 June 2021)

== Pre-season and friendlies ==
Win Draw Loss

9 September 2020 Friendly	Genoa (Italy)	2–1	(Italy) Carpi	Genoa, Italy
15:00 CEST (UTC+2)	Favilli 43', 62' (pen.)	Report	Fofana 67'	Stadium: Stadio La Sciorba; Attendance: 0

10 September 2020 Friendly	Genoa (Italy)	2–1	(Italy) Carrarese	Genoa, Italy
15:00 CEST (UTC+2)	Bianchi 38'; Masiello 90'	Report	Caccavallo 5'	Stadium: Stadio La Sciorba; Attendance: 0

== Competitions ==
=== Overview ===
Competition	First match	Last match	Starting round	Final position	Record							
Competition	First match	Last match	Starting round	Final position	Pld	W	D	L	GF	GA	GD	Win %
Serie A	20 September 2020	22 May 2021	Matchday 1	11th	38	10	12	16	47	58	−11	26.32
Coppa Italia	28 October 2020	13 January 2021	Third round	Round of 16	3	2	0	1	7	5	+2	66.67
Total					41	12	12	17	54	63	−9	29.27

Source: Soccerway

=== Serie A ===
==== League table ====
Pos	Team	Pld	W	D	L	GF	GA	GD	Pts
9	Sampdoria	38	15	7	16	52	54	−2	52
10	Hellas Verona	38	11	12	15	46	48	−2	45
11	Genoa	38	10	12	16	47	58	−11	42
12	Bologna	38	10	11	17	51	65	−14	41
13	Fiorentina	38	9	13	16	47	59	−12	40

Source: Serie A, Soccerway
Rules for classification: 1) Points; 2) Head-to-head points; 3) Head-to-head goal difference; 4) Goal difference; 5) Goals scored; 6) Draw. (Note: Head-to-head record is used only after all the matches between the teams in question have been played)

==== Results summary ====
Overall								Home						Away					
Pld	W	D	L	GF	GA	GD	Pts	W	D	L	GF	GA	GD	W	D	L	GF	GA	GD
38	10	12	16	47	58	−11	42	5	7	7	29	30	−1	5	5	9	18	28	−10

Source: Serie A

==== Results by round ====
Round	1	2	3	4	5	6	7	8	9	10	11	12	13	14	15	16	17	18	19	20	21	22	23	24	25	26	27	28	29	30	31	32	33	34	35	36	37	38
Ground	H	A	H	A	H	A	H	A	H	A	H	H	A	A	H	A	H	A	H	A	H	A	H	A	H	A	H	A	H	A	A	H	H	A	H	A	H	A
Result	W	L	L	D	L	D	L	L	L	D	L	D	L	W	D	L	W	D	W	W	W	D	D	L	D	L	D	W	D	L	L	D	W	L	L	W	L	W
Position	1	13	15	11	16	16	18	19	19	19	19	18	19	18	19	19	17	16	16	14	12	11	11	13	13	13	14	13	13	13	13	14	13	13	14	14	14	11

Source: Serie A
A = Away; H = Home; W = Win; D = Draw; L = Loss

==== Matches ====
The league fixtures were announced on 2 September 2020.

20 September 2020 1	Genoa	4–1	Crotone	Genoa
15:00 CEST (UTC+2)	Destro 6'; Pandev 9', (yellow card) 44'; Zappacosta 34', (yellow card) 37'; Zajc (yellow card) 41'; Ghiglione (yellow card) 70'; Pjaca 75'	Report	Rivière 28'; Molina (yellow card) 29'; Mazzotta (yellow card) 32'	Stadium: Stadio Luigi Ferraris; Referee: Giovanni Ayroldi

27 September 2020 2	Napoli	6–0	Genoa	Naples
15:00 CEST (UTC+2)	Lozano 42', 65'; Zieliński 46'; Mertens 57'; Elmas 69'; Politano 72'; Osimhen (yellow card) 90+1'	Report	Destro (yellow card) 90'; Masiello (yellow card) 90+1'	Stadium: Stadio San Paolo; Referee: Juan Luca Sacchi

19 October 2020 4	Hellas Verona	0–0	Genoa	Verona
20:45 CEST (UTC+2)	Tameze (yellow card) 53'	Report	Badelj (yellow card) 11'; Pandev (yellow card) 43'; Ghiglione (yellow card) 54'; Goldaniga (yellow card) 85'	Stadium: Stadio Marcantonio Bentegodi; Referee: Antonio Rapuano

24 October 2020 5	Genoa	0–2	Internazionale	Genoa
18:00 CEST (UTC+2)	Bani (yellow card) 86'	Report	Martínez (yellow card) 40'; Lukaku 64'; D'Ambrosio 79'	Stadium: Stadio Luigi Ferraris; Referee: Davide Massa

1 November 2020 6	Sampdoria	1–1	Genoa	Genoa
20:45 CET (UTC+1)	Quagliarella (yellow card) 5'; Jankto 23', (yellow card) 59'; Thorsby (yellow card) 29'; Ekdal (yellow card) 38'; Bereszyński (yellow card) 86'	Report	Goldaniga (yellow card) 18'; Scamacca 28'	Stadium: Stadio Luigi Ferraris; Attendance: 0 Referee: Federico La Penna

4 November 2020 3	Genoa	1–2	Torino	Genoa
17:00 CET (UTC+1)	Badelj (yellow card) 31'; Rovella (yellow card) 51'; Scamacca 90+4'	Report	Lukić 10', (yellow card) 90+3'; Gojak (yellow card) 23'; Pellegrini 26' (o.g.); Rincón (yellow card) 45+3'; Singo (yellow card) 68'	Stadium: Stadio Luigi Ferraris; Attendance: 0 Referee: Paolo Valeri
Note: The match originally scheduled for 3 October, but postponed due to 14 confirmed cases of COVID-19 at Genoa.

8 November 2020 7	Genoa	1–3	Roma	Genoa
15:00 CET (UTC+1)	Zajc (yellow card) 6'; Pjaca 50'	Report	Mkhitaryan 45+2', 67', 85'	Stadium: Stadio Luigi Ferraris; Attendance: 0 Referee: Massimiliano Irrati

22 November 2020 8	Udinese	1–0	Genoa	Udine
18:00 CET (UTC+1)	De Paul 34'; Arslan (yellow card) 65'; Musso (yellow card) 76'	Report	Masiello (yellow card) 31'; Badelj (yellow card) 63'; Scamacca (yellow card) 90+5'; Perin (red card) 90+7'	Stadium: Stadio Friuli; Attendance: 0 Referee: Gianpaolo Calvarese

30 November 2020 9	Genoa	1–2	Parma	Genoa
20:45 CET (UTC+1)	Shomurodov 50'; Badelj (yellow card) 76'; Bani (yellow card) 84'	Report	Gervinho 10', 47'; Busi (yellow card) 58'; Karamoh (yellow card) 67'	Stadium: Stadio Luigi Ferraris; Attendance: 0 Referee: Maurizio Mariani

7 December 2020 10	Fiorentina	1–1	Genoa	Florence
20:45 CET (UTC+1)	Pulgar (yellow card) 15'; Valero (yellow card) 90+4'; Milenković 90+8'	Report	Sturaro (yellow card) 45+2'; Pellegrini (yellow card) 73'; Pjaca 89'	Stadium: Stadio Artemio Franchi; Attendance: 0 Referee: Daniele Doveri

13 December 2020 11	Genoa	1–3	Juventus	Genoa
18:00 CET (UTC+1)	Goldaniga (yellow card) 15'; Sturaro 61'; Perin (yellow card) 88'; Bani (yellow card) 90+3'	Report	Rabiot (yellow card) 2'; Dybala 57'; McKennie (yellow card) 77'; Ronaldo 78' (pen.), 89' (pen.); Bentancur (yellow card) 83'	Stadium: Stadio Luigi Ferraris; Attendance: 0 Referee: Marco Di Bello

16 December 2020 12	Genoa	2–2	Milan	Genoa
20:45 CET (UTC+1)	Pellegrini (yellow card) 18'; Destro 47', 60'; Radovanović (yellow card) 87'	Report	Romagnoli (yellow card) 25'; Calabria 52'; Castillejo (yellow card) 54'; Kalulu 83'; Leão (yellow card) 83'	Stadium: Stadio Luigi Ferraris; Attendance: 0 Referee: Daniele Orsato

20 December 2020 13	Benevento	2–0	Genoa	Benevento
15:00 CET (UTC+1)	Caprari (yellow card) 43'; Insigne 57'; Sau 89' (pen.)	Report	Bani (yellow card) 13'; Goldaniga (yellow card) 67'; Masiello (yellow card) 88'	Stadium: Stadio Ciro Vigorito; Attendance: 0 Referee: Antonio Giua

23 December 2020 14	Spezia	1–2	Genoa	La Spezia
20:45 CET (UTC+1)	Erlić (yellow card) 2'; Chabot (yellow card) 5'; Nzola 10'; Terzi (yellow card) 72'	Report	Destro 16', (yellow card) 70'; Pandev (yellow card) 33'; Ghiglione (yellow card) 43'; Criscito 73' (pen.); Zajc (yellow card) 75'	Stadium: Stadio Alberto Picco; Attendance: 0 Referee: Davide Massa

3 January 2021 15	Genoa	1–1	Lazio	Genoa
15:00 CET (UTC+1)	Destro 58', (yellow card) 59'; Czyborra (yellow card) 63'	Report	Immobile 15' (pen.); Patric (yellow card) 43'; Milinković-Savić (yellow card) 60'; Lucas (yellow card) 69'; Escalante (yellow card) 90+3'	Stadium: Stadio Luigi Ferraris; Attendance: 0 Referee: Gianpaolo Calvarese

6 January 2021 16	Sassuolo	2–1	Genoa	Reggio Emilia
15:00 CET (UTC+1)	Ayhan (yellow card) 39'; Boga 52'; Bourabia (yellow card) 59'; Raspadori 83'; Müldür (yellow card) 87'	Report	Criscito (yellow card) 12'; Masiello (yellow card) 23'; Shomurodov 64'; Goldaniga (yellow card) 85'	Stadium: Mapei Stadium; Attendance: 0 Referee: Michael Fabbri

9 January 2021 17	Genoa	2–0	Bologna	Genoa
18:00 CET (UTC+1)	Zajc 44'; Destro 55'; Radovanović (yellow card) 66'; Ghiglione (yellow card) 87'	Report		Stadium: Stadio Luigi Ferraris; Attendance: 0 Referee: Daniele Doveri

17 January 2021 18	Atalanta	0–0	Genoa	Bergamo
18:00 CET (UTC+1)	Gosens (yellow card) 83'	Report	Goldaniga (yellow card) 72'; Zappacosta (yellow card) 75'	Stadium: Gewiss Stadium; Attendance: 0 Referee: Livio Marinelli

24 January 2021 19	Genoa	1–0	Cagliari	Genoa
15:00 CET (UTC+1)	Destro 10', (yellow card) 18'	Report	Nández (yellow card) 20'; Zappa (yellow card) 85'	Stadium: Stadio Luigi Ferraris; Attendance: 0 Referee: Marco Di Bello

31 January 2021 20	Crotone	0–3	Genoa	Crotone
15:00 CET (UTC+1)	Messias (yellow card) 33'; Eduardo (yellow card) 85'; Reca (yellow card) 90'	Report	Destro 24', 50'; Strootman (yellow card) 28'; Czyborra 29'	Stadium: Stadio Ezio Scida; Attendance: 0 Referee: Piero Giacomelli

6 February 2021 21	Genoa	2–1	Napoli	Genoa
20:45 CET (UTC+1)	Pandev 11', 26'; Badelj (yellow card) 29'; Czyborra (yellow card) 57'	Report	Lozano (yellow card) 74'; Politano 79'; Mário Rui (yellow card) 90+4'	Stadium: Stadio Luigi Ferraris; Attendance: 0 Referee: Gianluca Manganiello

13 February 2021 22	Torino	0–0	Genoa	Turin
15:00 CET (UTC+1)	Bremer (yellow card) 79'; Izzo (yellow card) 84'	Report	Criscito (yellow card) 10'; Rovella (yellow card) 38'; Goldaniga (yellow card) 60'; Radovanović (yellow card) 90+1'	Stadium: Stadio Olimpico Grande Torino; Attendance: 0 Referee: Fabrizio Pasqua

20 February 2021 23	Genoa	2–2	Hellas Verona	Genoa
18:00 CET (UTC+1)	Shomurodov 48'; Strootman (yellow card) 57'; Badelj 90+4'	Report	Ilić 17'; Faraoni 61'; Çetin (yellow card) 74'	Stadium: Stadio Luigi Ferraris; Attendance: 0 Referee: Matteo Marchetti

28 February 2021 24	Internazionale	3–0	Genoa	Milan
15:00 CET (UTC+1)	Lukaku 1'; Darmian 69'; Sánchez 77'	Report	Zapata (yellow card) 19'; Strootman (yellow card) 40'	Stadium: San Siro; Attendance: 0 Referee: Daniele Chiffi

3 March 2021 25	Genoa	1–1	Sampdoria	Genoa
20:45 CET (UTC+1)	Badelj (yellow card) 34'; Zappacosta 52'	Report	Tonelli 77'	Stadium: Stadio Luigi Ferraris; Attendance: 0 Referee: Luca Pairetto

7 March 2021 26	Roma	1–0	Genoa	Rome
12:30 CET (UTC+1)	Mancini 24', (yellow card) 65'	Report	Masiello (yellow card) 42'; Destro (yellow card) 45+1'; Strootman (yellow card) 64'; Criscito (yellow card) 84'	Stadium: Stadio Olimpico; Attendance: 0 Referee: Michael Fabbri

13 March 2021 27	Genoa	1–1	Udinese	Genoa
20:45 CET (UTC+1)	Pandev 8', (yellow card) 10'; Criscito (yellow card) 28'; Badelj (yellow card) 74'	Report	De Paul 30' (pen.); Nestorovski (yellow card) 90'	Stadium: Stadio Luigi Ferraris; Attendance: 0 Referee: Giacomo Camplone

19 March 2021 28	Parma	1–2	Genoa	Parma
20:45 CET (UTC+1)	Pellè 16', (yellow card) 72'; Bani (yellow card) 19'; Pezzella (yellow card) 57'; Brugman (yellow card) 78'; Kucka (yellow card) 90+5'	Report	Scamacca 50', 69'; Radovanović (yellow card) 73'; Biraschi (yellow card) 84'	Stadium: Stadio Ennio Tardini; Attendance: 0 Referee: Daniele Doveri

3 April 2021 29	Genoa	1–1	Fiorentina	Genoa
15:00 CEST (UTC+2)	Strootman (yellow card) 2'; Destro 13'; Zajc (yellow card) 64'	Report	Vlahović 23'; Ribéry (red card) 52'; Pulgar (yellow card) 90+5'	Stadium: Stadio Luigi Ferraris; Attendance: 0 Referee: Fabio Maresca

11 April 2021 30	Juventus	3–1	Genoa	Turin
15:00 CEST (UTC+2)	Kulusevski 4', (yellow card) 37'; Cuadrado (yellow card) 20'; Morata 22'; McKennie 70'; Alex Sandro (yellow card) 82'	Report	Behrami (yellow card) 38'; Scamacca 49'; Rovella (yellow card) 53'; Criscito (yellow card) 62'	Stadium: Allianz Stadium; Attendance: 0 Referee: Marco Di Bello

18 April 2021 31	Milan	2–1	Genoa	Milan
12:30 CEST (UTC+2)	Rebić 13'; Scamacca 68' (o.g.)	Report	Goldaniga (yellow card) 26'; Destro 37'	Stadium: San Siro; Attendance: 0 Referee: Gianpaolo Calvarese

21 April 2021 32	Genoa	2–2	Benevento	Genoa
20:45 CEST (UTC+2)	Radovanović (yellow card) 4'; Pandev 11', 21'; Strootman (yellow card) 30'	Report	Viola 5' (pen.); Lapadula 15'	Stadium: Stadio Luigi Ferraris; Attendance: 0 Referee: Luca Pairetto

24 April 2021 33	Genoa	2–0	Spezia	Genoa
15:00 CEST (UTC+2)	Criscito (yellow card) 18'; Pandev (yellow card) 32'; Scamacca 63'; Shomurodov 86'	Report	Terzi (yellow card) 2'; Nzola (yellow card) 37'	Stadium: Stadio Luigi Ferraris; Attendance: 0 Referee: Gianluca Manganiello

2 May 2021 34	Lazio	4–3	Genoa	Rome
12:30 CEST (UTC+2)	Correa 30', 56'; Immobile 43' (pen.); Lucas (yellow card) 45'; Luis Alberto 48'; Cataldi (yellow card) 79'; Farès (yellow card) 81'	Report	Biraschi (yellow card) 32'; Radovanović (yellow card) 43'; Marušić 47' (o.g.); Masiello (yellow card) 70'; Scamacca 80' (pen.); Shomurodov 81'; Cassata (yellow card) 90+2'	Stadium: Stadio Olimpico; Attendance: 0 Referee: Piero Giacomelli

9 May 2021 35	Genoa	1–2	Sassuolo	Genoa
12:30 CEST (UTC+2)	Zappacosta (yellow card) 30', (goal) 85'; Cassata (yellow card) 90+4'	Report	Raspadori 14'; Berardi 61'	Stadium: Stadio Luigi Ferraris; Attendance: 0 Referee: Maurizio Mariani

12 May 2021 36	Bologna	0–2	Genoa	Bologna
20:45 CEST (UTC+2)	Schouten (yellow card) 68'	Report	Zapata (yellow card) 1'; Zappacosta 13'; Shomurodov (yellow card) 46'; Scamacca 61' (pen.); Rovella (yellow card) 64'	Stadium: Stadio Renato Dall'Ara; Attendance: 0 Referee: Francesco Fourneau

15 May 2021 37	Genoa	3–4	Atalanta	Genoa
15:00 CEST (UTC+2)	Shomurodov 48', 84'; Pandev 67' (pen.); Rovella (yellow card) 88'	Report	Zapata 9'; Malinovskyi 26'; Gosens 44'; Pašalić 51'; Djimsiti (yellow card) 62'; Toloi (yellow card) 71'	Stadium: Stadio Luigi Ferraris; Attendance: 0 Referee: Livio Marinelli

22 May 2021 38	Cagliari	0–1	Genoa	Cagliari
20:45 CEST (UTC+2)	Carboni (yellow card) 77'	Report	Shomurodov 15'; Behrami (yellow card) 51' (yellow-red card) 83'; Melegoni (yellow card) 64'; Strootman (yellow card) 90+4'	Stadium: Sardegna Arena; Attendance: 0 Referee: Francesco Meraviglia

=== Coppa Italia ===
28 October 2020 Third round	Genoa	2–1	Catanzaro	Genoa
18:00 CET (UTC+1)	Scamacca 7', 64'; Masiello (yellow card) 57'	Report	Di Massimo (yellow card) 38'; Fazio 83'	Stadium: Stadio Luigi Ferraris; Referee: Lorenzo Maggioni

26 November 2020 Fourth round	Sampdoria	1–3	Genoa	Genoa
17:00 CET (UTC+1)	Verre 18'; Silva (yellow card) 26'; Yoshida (yellow card) 26'; Léris (yellow card) 62'	Report	Zapata (yellow card) 13'; Sturaro (yellow card) 43'; Scamacca 60', 72'; Lerager 68'; Pellegrini (yellow card) 69'; Ghiglione (yellow card) 75'	Stadium: Stadio Luigi Ferraris; Referee: Francesco Fourneau

13 January 2021 Round of 16	Juventus	3–2 (a.e.t.)	Genoa	Turin
20:45 CET (UTC+1)	Kulusevski 2'; Morata 23'; Bentancur (yellow card) 25'; Rafia 105'; Bernardeschi (yellow card) 120+1'	Report	Czyborra 28'; Dumbravanu (yellow card) 29'; Ghiglione (yellow card) 41'; Melegoni 74'; Goldaniga (yellow card) 90+2'; Bani (yellow card) 116'; Rovella (yellow card) 119'	Stadium: Allianz Stadium; Referee: Daniele Chiffi

== Statistics ==
=== Appearances and goals ===
No.	Pos	Nat	Player	Total		Serie A		Coppa Italia	
No.	Pos	Nat	Player	Apps	Goals	Apps	Goals	Apps	Goals
Goalkeepers
1	GK	(Italy) ITA	Mattia Perin	32	0	32	0	0	0
22	GK	(Italy) ITA	Federico Marchetti	6	0	4	0	2	0
32	GK	(Italy) ITA	Alberto Paleari	4	0	2+1	0	1	0
Defenders
2	DF	(Colombia) COL	Cristián Zapata	13	0	12	0	1	0
4	DF	(Italy) ITA	Domenico Criscito	24	1	20+3	1	1	0
5	DF	(Italy) ITA	Edoardo Goldaniga	27	0	19+6	0	2	0
14	DF	(Italy) ITA	Davide Biraschi	14	0	11+2	0	1	0
18	DF	(Italy) ITA	Paolo Ghiglione	26	0	14+9	0	2+1	0
25	DF	(Cameroon) CMR	Jérôme Onguéné	4	0	1+3	0	0	0
55	DF	(Italy) ITA	Andrea Masiello	32	0	30	0	1+1	0
77	DF	(Italy) ITA	Davide Zappacosta	25	4	23+2	4	0	0
88	DF	(Italy) ITA	Luca Pellegrini	12	0	7+4	0	1	0
90	DF	(Moldova) MDA	Daniel Dumbravanu	1	0	0	0	1	0
99	DF	(Germany) GER	Lennart Czyborra	19	2	15+2	1	2	1
Midfielders
11	MF	(Switzerland) SUI	Valon Behrami	26	0	8+18	0	0	0
16	MF	(Slovenia) SLO	Miha Zajc	33	1	22+9	1	2	0
17	MF	(Italy) ITA	Manolo Portanova	3	0	0+3	0	0	0
20	MF	(Netherlands) NED	Kevin Strootman	18	0	18	0	0	0
21	MF	(Serbia) SRB	Ivan Radovanović	35	0	24+9	0	1+1	0
24	MF	(Italy) ITA	Filippo Melegoni	17	1	3+11	0	1+2	1
29	MF	(Italy) ITA	Francesco Cassata	9	0	2+6	0	0+1	0
47	MF	(Croatia) CRO	Milan Badelj	31	1	29+1	1	0+1	0
65	MF	(Italy) ITA	Nicolò Rovella	22	0	12+8	0	2	0
89	MF	(France) FRA	Steeve-Mike Eboa Ebongue	4	0	0+3	0	0+1	0
Forwards
9	FW	(Italy) ITA	Gianluca Scamacca	29	12	13+13	8	3	4
19	FW	(North Macedonia) MKD	Goran Pandev	30	7	15+14	7	0+1	0
23	FW	(Italy) ITA	Mattia Destro	30	11	22+7	11	1	0
30	FW	(Italy) ITA	Giuseppe Caso	2	0	0+2	0	0	0
37	FW	(Croatia) CRO	Marko Pjaca	38	3	15+20	3	1+2	0
61	FW	(Uzbekistan) UZB	Eldor Shomurodov	32	8	16+15	8	1	0
91	FW	(Sierra Leone) SLE	Yayah Kallon	1	0	0+1	0	0	0
Players transferred out during the season
8	MF	(Denmark) DEN	Lukas Lerager	19	1	13+3	0	2+1	1
13	DF	(Italy) ITA	Mattia Bani	13	0	10+1	0	2	0
15	MF	(Poland) POL	Filip Jagiełło	0	0	0	0	0	0
20	MF	(Denmark) DEN	Lasse Schöne	0	0	0	0	0	0
27	MF	(Italy) ITA	Stefano Sturaro	7	1	6	1	1	0
30	FW	(Italy) ITA	Andrea Favilli	0	0	0	0	0	0
32	DF	(Denmark) DEN	Peter Ankersen	0	0	0	0	0	0
70	MF	(Italy) ITA	Vittorio Parigini	5	0	0+4	0	1	0
79	FW	(Switzerland) SUI	Darian Males	1	0	0	0	0+1	0
99	FW	(Italy) ITA	Andrea Pinamonti	0	0	0	0	0	0

Last updated: 22 May 2021
Source: Competitions

=== Goalscorers ===
As of 22 May 2021

Rank	No.	Pos	Nat	Name	Serie A	Coppa Italia	Total
1	9	FW	(Italy)	Gianluca Scamacca	8	4	12
2	23	FW	(Italy)	Mattia Destro	11	0	11
3	61	FW	(Uzbekistan)	Eldor Shomurodov	8	0	8
4	19	FW	(North Macedonia)	Goran Pandev	7	0	7
5	77	DF	(Italy)	Davide Zappacosta	4	0	4
6	37	FW	(Croatia)	Marko Pjaca	3	0	3
7	8	MF	(Denmark)	Lukas Lerager	1	1	2
7	99	DF	(Germany)	Lennart Czyborra	1	1	2
8	47	MF	(Croatia)	Milan Badelj	1	0	1
8	4	DF	(Italy)	Domenico Criscito	1	0	1
8	16	MF	(Slovenia)	Miha Zajc	1	0	1
8	24	MF	(Italy)	Filippo Melegoni	0	1	1
8	27	MF	(Italy)	Stefano Sturaro	1	0	1
Totals					47	7	54
