= Ebongue =

Ebongue is a surname. Notable people with the name include:

- Érnest Ebongué (born 1962), Cameroonian footballer
- Steeve-Mike Eboa Ebongue (born 2001), French footballer
