= List of French footballers in Serie A =

The list of French footballers in Serie A records the association football players from France who have appeared at least once for a team in the Italian Serie A. Entries in bold denote players still active in current season.

== A ==
- Yacine Adli – Milan, Fiorentina – 2022–25
- **Michel Adopo** – Torino, Atalanta, **Cagliari** – 2019–20, 2022–
- Lucien Agoumé – Inter, Spezia – 2019–21, 2023–24
- Marley Aké – Juventus, Udinese – 2021–22, 2023–24
- Jimmy Algerino – Venezia – 2001–02
- Kelvin Amian – Spezia – 2021–23
- Nicolas Anelka – Juventus – 2012–13
- **Arthur Atta** – Udinese, **Fiorentina** – 2024–
- Florian Ayé – Brescia – 2019–20

== B ==
- Ibrahim Ba – Milan, Perugia – 1997–2003
- **Benoît Badiashile** – **Napoli** – 2026–
- Jean-Christophe Bahebeck – Pescara – 2016–17
- Tiémoué Bakayoko – Milan, Napoli – 2018–19, 2020–23
- **Darryl Bakola** – **Sassuolo** – 2025–
- Anthony Basso – Udinese – 2000–01
- Antoine Bernède – Verona – 2024–26
- Jonathan Biabiany – Parma, Inter, Sampdoria – 2009–17, 2018–19
- Philippe Billy – Lecce – 2001–02, 2003–04, 2005–06
- Laurent Blanc – Napoli, Inter – 1991–92, 1999–2001
- Jocelyn Blanchard – Juventus – 1998–99
- Alexis Blin – Lecce – 2022–24
- Alain Boghossian – Napoli, Sampdoria, Parma – 1994–2002
- **Warren Bondo** – Monza, Milan, Cremonese – 2022–
- Emile Bongiorni – Torino – 1948–49
- Antoine Bonifaci – Inter, Bologna, Torino, Vicenza – 1954–59, 1960–61
- Daniel Bravo – Parma – 1996–97
- Jérémie Bréchet – Inter – 2003–04
- **Jean Butez** – **Como** – 2024–

== C ==
- Abdoulaye Camara – Udinese – 2025–26
- Zoumana Camara – Empoli – 1998–99
- Vincent Candela – Roma, Udinese, Siena, Messina – 1996–2007
- **Maxence Caqueret** – **Como** – 2024–
- Benoît Cauet – Inter, Torino, Como – 1997–2003
- Fabien Centonze – Verona – 2023–24
- Michaël Ciani – Lazio – 2012–15
- Djibril Cissé – Lazio – 2011–12
- Kingsley Coman – Juventus – 2014–16
- Nestor Combin – Juventus, Varese, Torino, Milan – 1964–71
- Benoît Costil – Salernitana – 2023–24
- Jean-Christophe Coubronne – Novara – 2011–12
- Michaël Cuisance – Venezia, Sampdoria – 2021–23
- Jean-Pierre Cyprien – Torino, Lecce – 1994–95, 1997–98
- Wylan Cyprien – Parma – 2020–21, 2024–25

== D ==
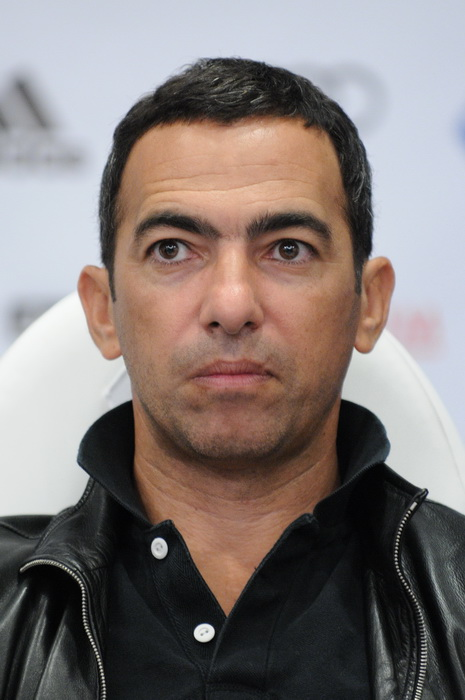
Youri Djorkaeff in 2011

- **Lucas Da Cunha** – **Como** – 2024–
- Ousmane Dabo – Inter, Vicenza, Parma, Atalanta, Lazio – 1998–2006, 2007–10
- Olivier Dacourt – Roma, Inter – 2002–09
- Stéphane Dalmat – Inter – 2000–03
- Grégoire Defrel – Parma, Cesena, Sassuolo, Roma, Sampdoria – 2010–11, 2014–24
- Sebastian De Maio – Brescia, Genoa, Fiorentina, Bologna, Udinese – 2010–11, 2013–22
- **Ali Dembélé** – Torino, **Lecce** – 2024–
- Marcel Desailly – Milan – 1993–98
- Didier Deschamps – Juventus – 1994–99
- Vikash Dhorasoo – Milan – 2004–05
- Moussa Diaby – Crotone – 2017–18
- Modibo Diakité – Lazio, Fiorentina, Cagliari, Frosinone, Sampdoria – 2006–12, 2013–16
- **Sankhoun Diawara** – **Milan** – 2026–
- Oumar Dieng – Sampdoria – 1996–98
- Lucas Digne – Roma – 2015–16
- **Andy Diouf** – **Inter** – 2025–
- Martin Djetou – Parma – 2001–02
- Youri Djorkaeff – Inter – 1996–99
- Bruce Dombolo – Ancona – 2003–04
- **Mamedi Doucouré** – **Genoa** – 2025–
- Christophe Dugarry – Milan – 1996–97

== E ==
- Steeve-Mike Eboa Ebongue – Genoa – 2020–21
- **Nesta Elphege** – **Parma** – 2025–
- Patrice Evra – Juventus – 2014–17
- Valentin Eysseric – Fiorentina, Verona – 2017–21

== F ==
- Joachim Fernandez – Udinese – 1997–98
- Mathieu Flamini – Milan – 2008–13
- **Manga Foe Ondoa** – **Monza** – 2026–
- Youssouf Fofana – Milan – 2024–26
- Nicolas Frey – Chievo – 2008–17, 2018–19
- Sébastien Frey – Inter, Verona, Parma, Fiorentina, Genoa – 1998–2013

== G ==
- Valentin Gendrey – Lecce – 2022–25
- Gaël Genevier – Perugia, Siena – 2003–04, 2009–10
- **Willem Geubbels** – **Lecce** – 2026–
- Samuel Gigot – Lazio – 2024–26
- Olivier Giroud – Milan – 2021–24
- Ludovic Giuly – Roma – 2007–08
- Eddy Gnahoré – Crotone – 2016–17
- Iron Gomis – Salernitana – 2023–24
- Maxime Gonalons – Roma – 2017–18
- Yoann Gourcuff – Milan – 2006–08
- Lucas Gourna-Douath – Roma – 2024–25
- Clément Grenier – Roma – 2016–17
- Mattéo Guendouzi – Lazio – 2023–26
- Axel Guessand – Udinese – 2022–24
- Frédéric Guilbert – Lecce – 2024–25

== H ==
- **Antoine Hainaut** – Parma, **Venezia** – 2024–25, 2026–
- Thierry Henry – Juventus – 1998–99
- Thomas Henry – Venezia, Verona – 2021–24
- Théo Hernandez – Milan – 2019–25
- Thomas Heurtaux – Udinese, Verona – 2012–18

== I ==
- Jonathan Ikoné – Fiorentina, Como – 2021–25

== J ==
- **Gaby Jean** – **Lecce** – 2024–

== K ==
- **Pierre Kalulu** – Milan, **Juventus** – 2020–
- Olivier Kapo – Juventus – 2004–05
- Yann Karamoh – Inter, Parma, Torino – 2017–21, 2022–25
- Ibrahim Karamoko – Chievo – 2018–19
- Isaac Karamoko – Sassuolo – 2020–21
- Christian Karembeu – Sampdoria – 1995–97
- **Randal Kolo Muani** – **Juventus** – 2024–25, 2026–
- **Manu Koné** – **Roma** – 2024–
- Abdoulay Konko – Siena, Genoa, Lazio, Atalanta – 2006–08, 2010–17

== L ==
- **Gaël Lafont** – **Genoa** – 2025–
- Pierre Laigle – Sampdoria – 1996–99
- Mathis Lambourde – Verona – 2024–25
- Sabri Lamouchi – Parma, Inter – 2000–04
- **Armand Laurienté** – **Sassuolo** – 2022–24, 2025–
- Vincent Laurini – Empoli, Fiorentina, Parma – 2014–21
- Andréa Le Borgne – Como – 2025–26
- Enzo Le Fée – Roma – 2024–25
- Lucien Leduc – Venezia – 1949–50
- Maxime Lopez – Sassuolo, Fiorentina – 2020–24

== M ==
- Yann M'Vila – Inter – 2014–15
- Jean-Victor Makengo – Udinese – 2020–23
- **Mike Maignan** – **Milan** – 2021–
- Thomas Mangani – Chievo – 2014–15
- **Yanis Massolin** – **Cagliari** – 2026–
- Blaise Matuidi – Juventus – 2017–20
- **Yvan Maye** – **Monza** – 2026–
- Soualiho Meïté – Torino, Milan, Cremonese – 2018–21, 2022–23
- Jérémy Ménez – Roma, Milan – 2008–11, 2014–16
- Philippe Mexès – Roma, Milan – 2004–16
- Johan Micoud – Parma – 2000–02
- François Modesto – Cagliari – 1999–2000
- Anthony Mounier – Bologna, Atalanta – 2015–17
- Lys Mousset – Salernitana – 2021–22

== N ==
- Lilian Nalis – Chievo – 2002–03
- Tanguy Ndombélé – Napoli – 2022–23
- Bruno Ngotty – Milan, Venezia – 1998–2000
- Aurélien Nguiamba – Spezia – 2021–22
- Niels Nkounkou – Torino – 2025–26
- Christopher Nkunku – Milan – 2025–26
- Ferenc Nyers – Lazio – 1948–50
- Steven Nzonzi – Roma – 2018–19

== O ==
- Yllan Okou – Verona – 2024–25
- Rémi Oudin – Lecce – 2022–25

== P ==
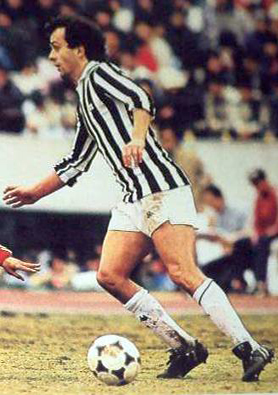
Michel Platini playing for Juventus

- Jean-Pierre Papin – Milan – 1992–94
- **Benjamin Pavard** – **Inter** – 2023–
- Reynald Pedros – Parma, Napoli – 1996–98
- Marc Pfertzel – Livorno – 2004–07
- Balthazar Pierret – Lecce – 2024–26
- Michel Platini – Juventus – 1982–87
- Paul Pogba – Juventus – 2012–16, 2022–24
- William Prunier – Napoli – 1997–98

== R ==
- **Adrien Rabiot** – Juventus, **Milan** – 2019–24, 2025–
- Adil Rami – Milan – 2013–15
- Julien Rantier – Atalanta – 2002–03
- Anthony Réveillère – Napoli – 2013–14
- Frank Ribéry – Fiorentina, Salernitana – 2019–23

== S ==
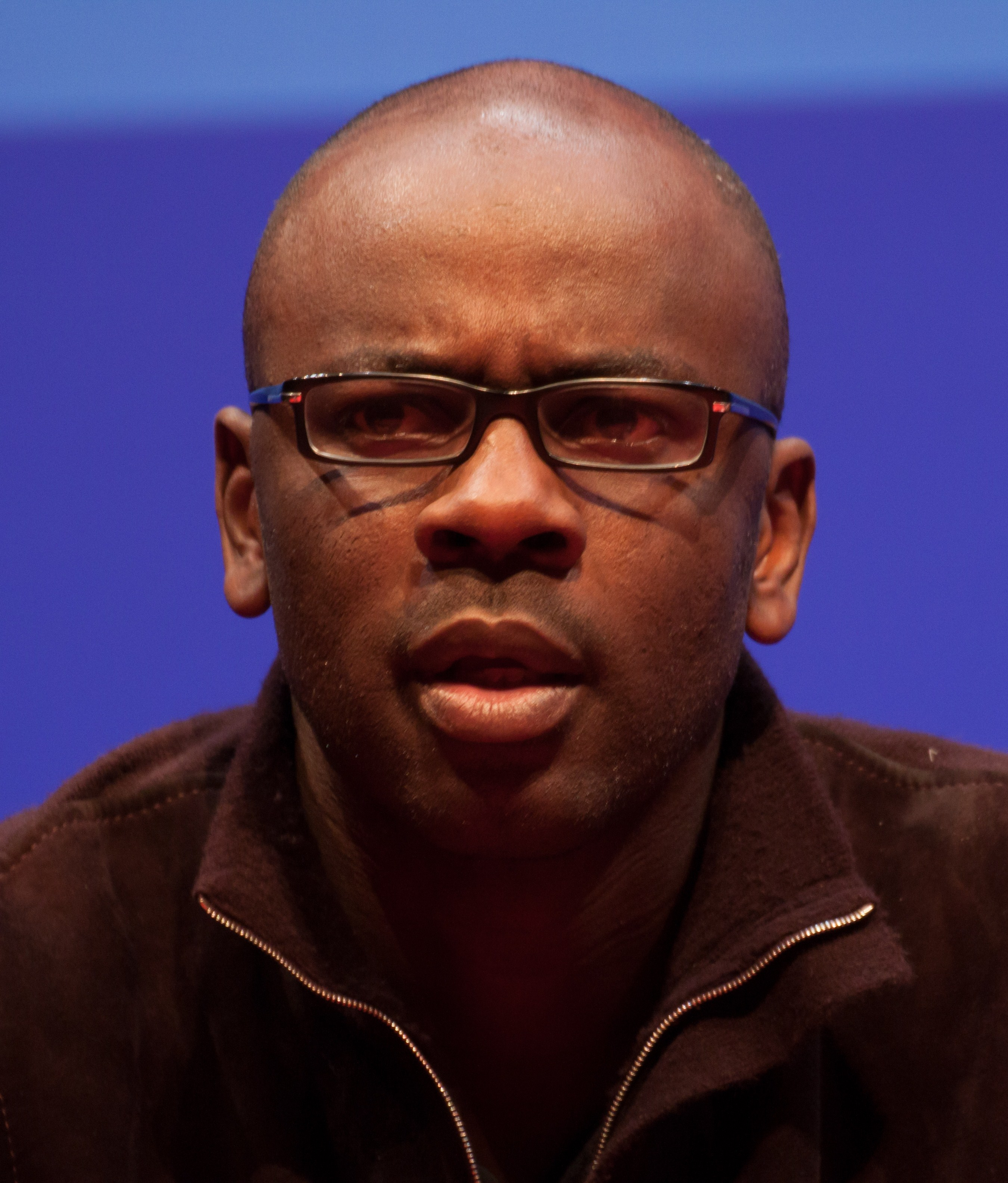
Lilian Thuram

- Bacary Sagna – Benevento – 2017–18
- Louis Saha – Lazio – 2012–13
- Christophe Sanchez – Bologna – 1998–2000
- Franck Sauzée – Atalanta – 1993–94
- Mikaël Silvestre – Inter – 1998–99
- Brandon Soppy – Udinese, Atalanta, Torino – 2021–24
- Adama Soumaoro – Genoa, Bologna – 2019–23
- Samuel Souprayen – Verona – 2015–16, 2017–18 dual Réunionais international

== T ==
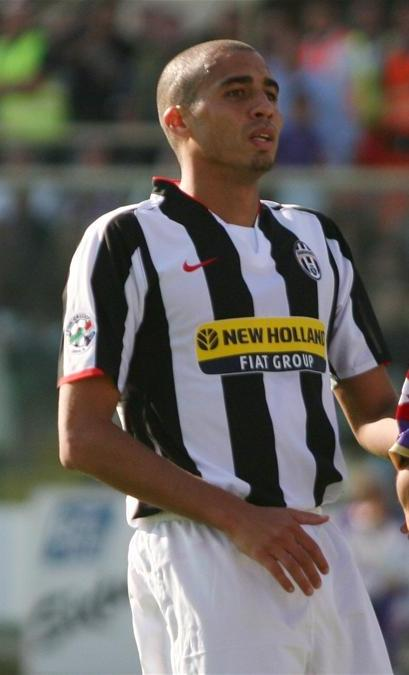
David Trezeguet playing for Juventus. He was the league's top scorer in 2002 and won the scudetto twice.

- Loum Tchaouna – Salernitana, Lazio – 2023–25
- Florian Thauvin – Udinese – 2022–25
- Cyril Théréau – Chievo, Udinese, Fiorentina, Cagliari – 2010–19
- **Khéphren Thuram** – **Juventus** – 2024–
- Lilian Thuram – Parma, Juventus – 1996–2006
- **Marcus Thuram** – **Inter** – 2023–
- Isaak Touré – Udinese – 2024–25
- Matteo Tramoni – Cagliari, Pisa – 2020–21, 2025–26
- **Yael Trepy** – **Cagliari** – 2025–
- David Trezeguet – Juventus – 2000–06, 2007–10

== U ==
- Samuel Umtiti – Lecce – 2022–23

== V ==
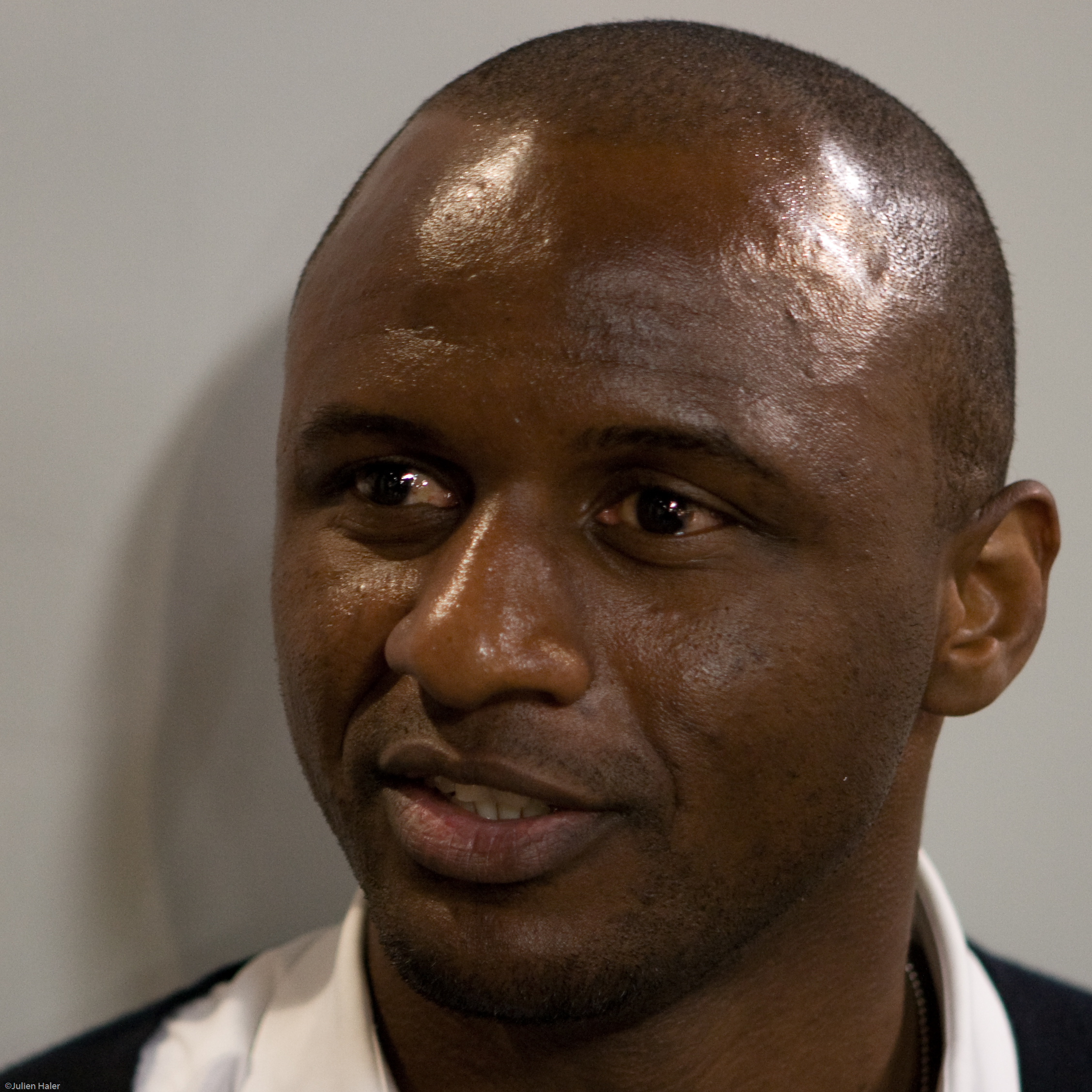
Patrick Vieira, he won with both Juventus and Inter; before he briefly played for Milan

- William Vainqueur – Roma – 2015–16
- Robinio Vaz – Roma – 2025–26
- Jordan Veretout – Fiorentina, Roma – 2017–22
- Patrick Vieira – Milan, Juventus, Inter – 1995–96, 2005–10

== W ==
- Maryan Wisnieski – Sampdoria – 1963–64

== Y ==
- Mapou Yanga-Mbiwa – Roma – 2014–15

== Z ==
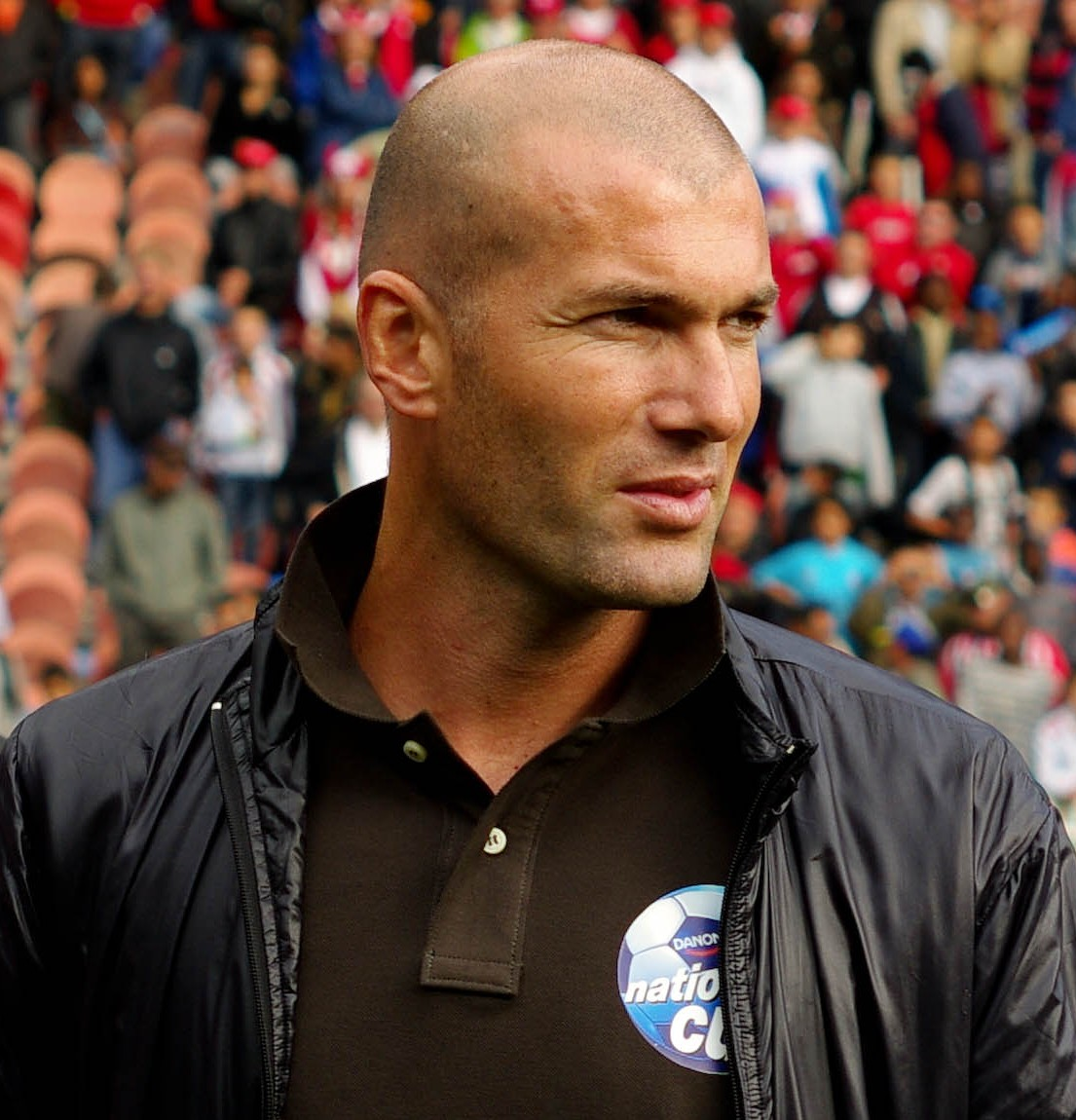
Zinedine Zidane, he won the 1998 Ballon d'Or while he was playing with Juventus

- Jonathan Zebina – Cagliari, Roma, Juventus, Brescia – 1998–2006, 2007–11
- Zinedine Zidane – Juventus – 1996–2001

== See also ==
- List of foreign Serie A players
- Serie A Foreign Footballer of the Year

== Notes ==
1. Born in Argentina
2. Born in Burkina Faso
3. Born in Cameroon
4. Born in the Central African Republic
5. Born in the French Guiana (Overseas department of the French Republic)
6. Born in Ghana
7. Born in Guadeloupe (Overseas department of the French Republic)
8. Born in Guinea
9. Born in Italy
10. Born in Ivory Coast
11. Born in New Caledonia (Overseas territory of the French Republic)
12. Born in Réunion (Overseas department of the French Republic)
13. Born in Senegal
14. Born in Tchad
15. Capped for the Brittany national football team
16. Capped for the Corsica national football team
17. Capped for the Kuwait national football team
