= 2024–25 WSG Tirol season =

WSG Tirol
2024–25 season
- Manager: Philipp Semlic
- Stadium: Tivoli Stadion Tirol
- Austrian Football Bundesliga: 10th
- Austrian Cup: Round of 16
- Top goalscorer: League: All: Tobias Anselm (3)
- Average home league attendance: 2,039
- Biggest win: SC Imst 0–3 WSG Tirol

The 2024–25 season is the 95th season in the history of WSG Tirol, and the club's sixth consecutive season in Austrian Football Bundesliga. In addition to the domestic league, the team is scheduled to participate in the Austrian Cup.

== Transfers ==
=== In ===
Pos.	Player	Transferred from	Fee	Date	Source
GK	(Austria) Alexander Eckmayr	(Austria) Rheindorf Altach	Free	1 July 2024	
FW	(Austria) Tobias Anselm	(Austria) LASK	Free	1 July 2024	
FW	(United States) Quincy Butler	(Germany) TSG Hoffenheim II	Free	1 July 2024	
DF	(Germany) Jamie Lawrence	(Germany) Bayern Munich	Loan	2 July 2024	
MF	(Germany) Lennart Czyborra	(Italy) Genoa	Loan	19 July 2024	
FW	(Austria) Florian Rieder	(Austria) Wolfsberger AC	Undisclosed	29 August 2024	

=== Out ===
Pos.	Player	Transferred to	Fee	Date	Source
FW	(Austria) Denis Tomic		End of contract	1 July 2024	
MF	(Slovenia) Sandi Ogrinec	(Bosnia and Herzegovina) Borac Banja Luka	End of contract	1 July 2024	
DF	(Germany) Kofi Schulz	(Iran) Mes Rafsanjan	End of contract	1 July 2024	

== Friendlies ==
=== Pre-season ===
13 August 2024 Friendly	Bayern Munich (Germany)	3–0	(Austria) WSG Tirol
18:00

4 September 2024 Friendly	FC Ingolstadt (Germany)	1–2	(Austria) WSG Tirol
14:00

10 October 2024 Friendly	WSG Tirol (Austria)	v	Austria Lustenau
14:30

== Competitions ==
=== Overall record ===
Competition	First match	Last match	Starting round	Record							
Competition	First match	Last match	Starting round	Pld	W	D	L	GF	GA	GD	Win %
Austrian Football Bundesliga	4 August 2024		Matchday 1	16	4	4	8	14	21	−7	25.00
Austrian Cup	28 July 2024		First round	3	2	0	1	7	5	+2	66.67
Total				19	6	4	9	21	26	−5	31.58

Last updated: 25 January 2025
Source: Soccerway

=== Austrian Football Bundesliga ===
==== League table ====
Pos	Team	Pld	W	D	L	GF	GA	GD	Pts	Qualification
8	TSV Hartberg	22	6	8	8	24	31	−7	26	Qualification for the Relegation round
9	Austria Klagenfurt	22	5	6	11	22	44	−22	21	Qualification for the Relegation round
10	WSG Tirol	22	4	7	11	20	31	−11	19	Qualification for the Relegation round
11	Grazer AK	22	3	7	12	27	45	−18	16	Qualification for the Relegation round
12	Rheindorf Altach	22	3	7	12	20	35	−15	16	Qualification for the Relegation round

Source: Austrian Football Bundesliga
Rules for classification: 1) Points; 2) Head-to-head record; 3) Goal difference; 4) Goals scored; 5) Matches won; 6) Away matches won; 7) Away goals scored.

Pos	Team	Pld	W	D	L	GF	GA	GD	Pts	Qualification	STU	RBS	AWI	WAC	RWI	BWL
1	Sturm Graz (C)	32	19	6	7	66	39	+27	40	Qualification for the Champions League play-off round	—	4–2	0–1	1–1	2–0	2–0
2	Red Bull Salzburg	32	16	9	7	53	36	+17	38	Qualification for the Champions League second qualifying round	1–2	—	2–0	1–1	4–2	2–1
3	Austria Wien	32	18	6	8	47	32	+15	37	Qualification for the Conference League second qualifying round	2–1	1–3	—	0–0	1–2	2–2
4	Wolfsberg	32	16	7	9	60	38	+22	37	Qualification for the Europa League third qualifying round (Note: Wolfsberg qualified for the Europa League third qualifying round as the 2024–25 Austrian Cup winners.)	1–1	2–1	1–2	—	5–1	2–0
5	Rapid Wien (O)	32	12	8	12	43	42	+1	27	Qualification for the Conference League play-offs	3–1	0–2	2–0	0–1	—	0–0
6	Blau-Weiß Linz	32	11	5	16	37	45	−8	21		0–1	1–2	0–2	1–2	2–1	—

Source: Austrian Football Bundesliga
Legend: Blue = home team win; Yellow = draw; Red = away team win.
Rules for classification: 1) Points; 2) Points with (possible) half points subtracted due to rounding; 3) Head-to-head points; 4) Head-to-head goal difference; 5) Head-to-head goals scored; 6) Goal difference; 7) Goals scored; 8) Matches won; 9) Away matches won; 10) Away goals scored.
(C) Champions; (O) Play-off winners
Notes:

Pos	Team	Pld	W	D	L	GF	GA	GD	Pts	Qualification	LSK	HAR	TIR	GAK	ALT	AKL
1	LASK	32	16	6	10	51	36	+15	38	Qualification for the Conference League play-offs	—	0–0	2–0	1–0	0–0	6–0
2	TSV Hartberg	32	11	11	10	40	40	0	31	Qualification for the Conference League play-offs	0–1	—	3–2	1–1	2–0	2–3
3	WSG Tirol	32	7	9	16	35	50	−15	20		1–3	1–3	—	1–1	1–0	5–3
4	Grazer AK	32	5	13	14	34	54	−20	20		1–0	0–3	0–0	—	1–0	1–1
5	Rheindorf Altach	32	5	11	16	29	46	−17	18		0–2	1–1	3–0	2–2	—	0–0

Source: Austrian Football Bundesliga
Legend: Blue = home team win; Yellow = draw; Red = away team win.
Rules for classification: 1) Points; 2) Points with (possible) half points subtracted due to rounding; 3) Head-to-head points; 4) Head-to-head goal difference; 5) Head-to-head goals scored; 6) Goal difference; 7) Goals scored; 8) Matches won; 9) Away matches won; 10) Away goals scored.

==== Results summary ====
Overall								Home						Away					
Pld	W	D	L	GF	GA	GD	Pts	W	D	L	GF	GA	GD	W	D	L	GF	GA	GD
9	2	3	4	8	11	−3	9	0	3	1	1	2	−1	2	0	3	7	9	−2

Last updated: 5 October 2024.
Source: ADMIRAL Bundesliga

==== Results by round ====
Round	1	2	3	4	5	6	7	8	9
Ground	A	H	A	H	A	A	H	A	H
Result	W	D	L	L	L	L	D	W	D
Position									

Updated to match(es) played on 5 October 2024. Source: ADMIRAL Bundesliga
A = Away; H = Home; W = Win; D = Draw; L = Loss

==== Matches ====
3 August 2024 1	Rheindorf Altach	1–2	WSG Tirol	Altach
17:00				Stadium: Stadion Schnabelholz

10 August 2024 2	WSG Tirol	0–0	Grazer AK	Innsbruck
17:00				Stadium: Tivoli Stadion Tirol

18 August 2024 3	Rapid Wien	2–0	WSG Tirol	Wien
17:00				Stadium: Allianz Stadion

24 August 2024 4	WSG Tirol	0–1	Austria Klagenfurt	Innsbruck
17:00				Stadium: Tivoli Stadion Tirol

31 August 2024 5	Sturm Graz	4–2	WSG Tirol	Graz
19:30				Stadium: Liebenauer Stadium

22 September 2024 7	WSG Tirol	0–0	Red Bull Salzburg	Innsbruck
14:30				Stadium: Tivoli Stadion Tirol

26 September 2024 6	Hartberg	1–0	WSG Tirol	Hartberg
18:30	Sulzbacher 89' (o.g.)

29 September 2024 8	Wolfsberger AC	1–3	WSG Tirol	Wolfsberg
14:30	Zukić 70'		Butler 48'; Üstündag 69'; Skrbo 90+3'	Stadium: Lavanttal-Arena

5 October 2024 9	WSG Tirol	1–1	Blau-Weiß Linz	Innsbruck
17:00	Taferner 83'		Lawrence 29' (o.g.)	Stadium: Tivoli Stadion Tirol; Attendance: 1,650; Referee: Alan Kijas

20 October 2024 10	WSG Tirol	v	LASK	Innsbruck
14:30				Stadium: Tivoli Stadion Tirol

=== Austrian Cup ===
28 July 2024 First round	SC Imst	0–3	WSG Tirol	Imst
16:30			Blume 23'; Anselm 65', 72'	Stadium: Velly Arena Imst; Referee: Stefan Macanovic

27 August 2024 Second round	Deutschlandsberger SC	2–4	WSG Tirol	Deutschlandsberg
19:00				Stadium: Koralmstadion; Referee: Manuel Baumann
