= Lilian Thuram =

French footballer (born 1972)

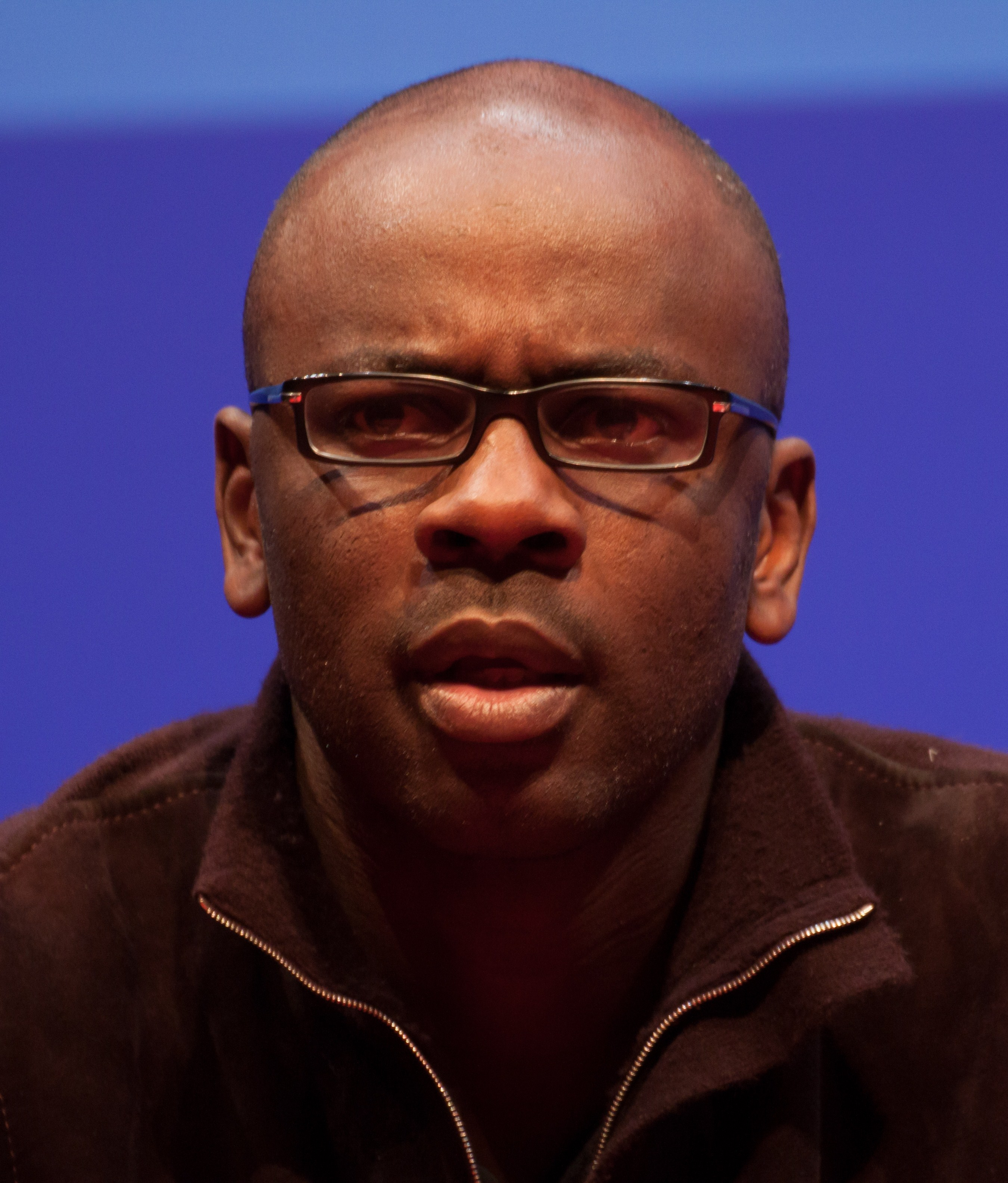
- Thuram in 2013

Personal information
- Full name: Ruddy Lilian Thuram-Ulien
- Date of birth: 1 January 1972 (age 54)
- Place of birth: Pointe-à-Pitre, Guadeloupe
- Height: 1.85 m (6 ft 1 in)
- Positions: Centre back; right-back

Youth career
- 1981–1982: Portugais de Fontainebleau
- 1983–1984: Fontainebleau
- 1985–1987: Melun
- 1987–1988: Melun-Fontainebleau
- 1989–1990: Fontainebleau
- 1990–1991: Monaco

Senior career*
Years	Team	Apps	(Gls)
1991–1996	Monaco	155	(8)
1996–2001	Parma	163	(1)
2001–2006	Juventus	144	(1)
2006–2008	Barcelona	41	(0)
Total		503	(10)

International career
1994–2008	France	142	(2)
Medal record
Men's football
Representing France
FIFA World Cup
Winner	1998
Runner-up	2006
UEFA European Championship
Winner	2000
FIFA Confederations Cup
Winner	2003
- * Club domestic league appearances and goals

Ruddy Lilian Thuram-Ulien (French pronunciation: [liljɑ̃ tyʁam]; born 1 January 1972) is a French author, philanthropist and former professional footballer who played as a defender. He was capable of playing both as a centre-back or as a right-back, and helped both offensively and defensively.

He began playing football professionally with Monaco and played in the top first division in France, Italy and Spain for over 15 seasons, with a little time spent in Serie A with both Parma and Juventus before finishing his career with Barcelona. With France, Thuram was a player for the team that won the 1998 FIFA World Cup; along with UEFA Euro 2000, and runners-up at the 2006 World Cup. Thuram was the most capped player in the history of the France national team with 142 appearances between 1994 and 2008 until Hugo Lloris surpassed the mark in 2022.

Thuram has been described as a "studious" figure off the pitch; in 2010, he became a UNICEF ambassador, and has taken initiatives to fight against racism.

== Early life ==
Thuram was born in Guadeloupe in the French West Indies. His family relocated to mainland France in 1981.

== Club career ==
Thuram's football career began with Monaco in Ligue 1 in 1991. He then transferred to Parma (1996–2001) and then to Juventus (2001–2006) for £25 million, and eventually to Barcelona in 2006.

=== Monaco ===
Thuram started his professional career with Monaco in 1991. He only made one appearance that season, but was officially promoted to the first team the following season, when he would go on to make 19 appearances.

He was inserted into the starting XI by the end of 1992 and would go on to make 155 league appearances for the Ligue 1 outfit, before transferring to Parma in the summer of 1996. He made his national team debut in 1994, while at Monaco. With Monaco, he won the Coupe de France in 1991, and reached the final of the 1991–92 European Cup Winners' Cup. He scored a total of 11 goals in his time at AS Monaco.

Thuram scored his only UEFA Champions League goal in his career for Monaco in a 4–1 victory over Spartak Moscow in the 1993–94 season.

=== Parma ===
In July 1996, Thuram made a transfer to Italy to join Serie A club Parma. In his first season, he made over 40 appearances for the club in all competitions, scoring one goal, as Parma finished second in the 1996–97 Serie A to Juventus. He maintained a starting position in defense throughout his time with Parma, making 163 Serie A appearances and scoring one league goal. In all, he made over 200 appearances for the club, which helped him cap in his national team.

Following another season in 2000–01, where Parma reached the Coppa Italia final, and finishing the Serie A season in fourth place, Thuram, along with teammate Gianluigi Buffon, transferred to Juventus. His transfer cost the club 80 billion Italian lire (€41,316,552).

While at Parma, along with eventual Juventus teammates Buffon and Fabio Cannavaro, Thuram won both the UEFA Cup and the Coppa Italia during the 1998–99 season, immediately followed by the 1999 Supercoppa Italiana.

=== Juventus ===
In the summer of 2001, Thuram made a transfer to Juventus, along with goalkeeper Gianluigi Buffon. Thuram formed defensive partnerships with the likes of Ciro Ferrara, Paolo Montero, Gianluca Pessotto, Mark Iuliano, Alessandro Birindelli, Igor Tudor, Gianluca Zambrotta, Nicola Legrottaglie, Fabio Cannavaro, Giorgio Chiellini, Federico Balzaretti and Jonathan Zebina during his five-year tenure with the club. In his first season with the club, as a right back under Marcello Lippi, Thuram won the 2001–02 Serie A title, reaching the final of the 2001–02 Coppa Italia. Juventus started the following season by winning the 2002 Supercoppa Italiana, and defended their Serie A title, also reaching the UEFA Champions League final, where they were defeated by rivals Milan on penalties.

Juventus won the 2003 Supercoppa Italiana the following season, reaching another Coppa Italia final, but finished at 3rd place in Serie A, and failed to progress past the second round in the Champions League. During the 2004–05 and 2005–06 seasons under coach Fabio Capello, Thuram, along with Fabio Cannavaro in the centre of defence, with Gianluigi Buffon in goal, Jonathan Zebina at right back and Gianluca Zambrotta at left back formed one of the most expensive defenses in Europe and Italy. During these next two seasons with the club, Thuram won the Scudetto two more times with Juventus, although these consecutive league titles were later revoked due to Juventus' involvement in the 2006 Italian football scandal (calciopoli). After five years with Juve, Thuram transferred to Barcelona in the Spanish La Liga, in the wake of the calciopoli scandal. He managed over 200 total appearances for the club, with two goals.

=== Barcelona ===
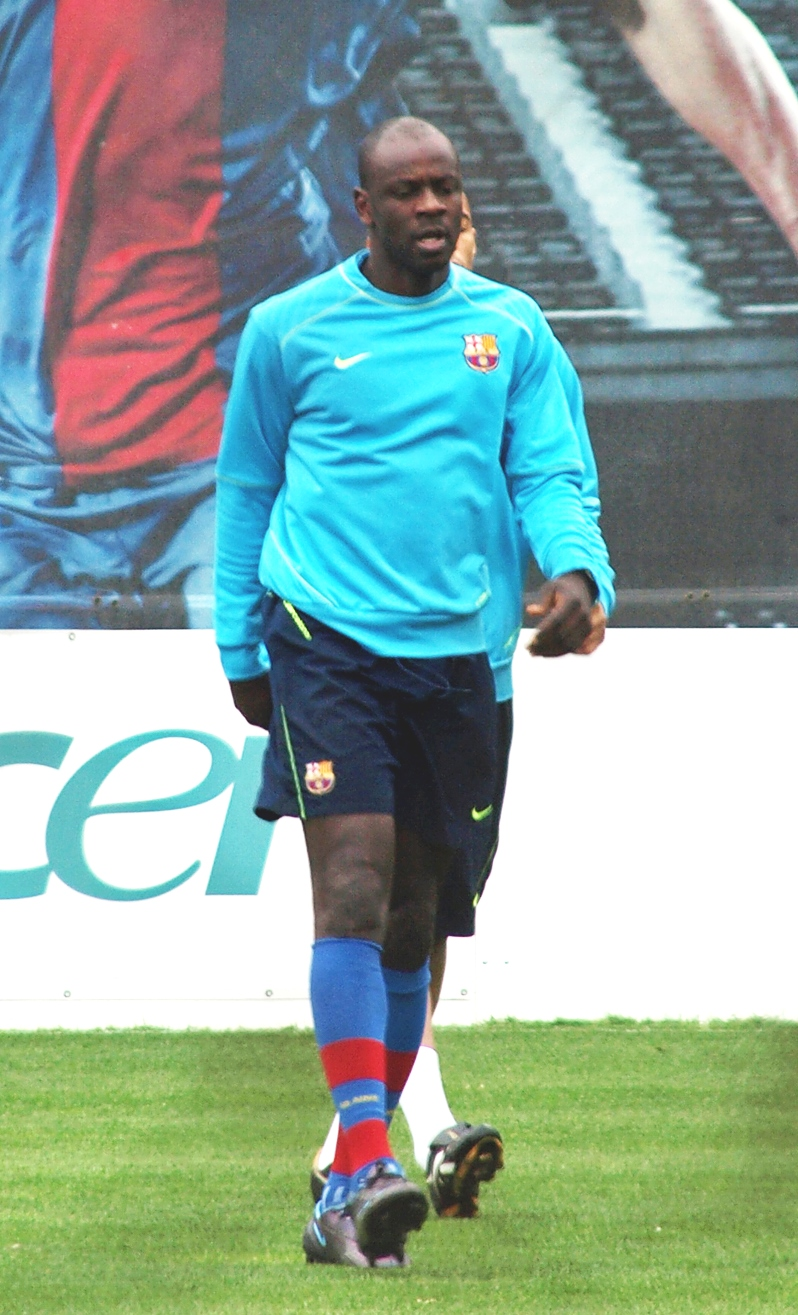
Thuram with Barcelona in 2008

On 24 July 2006, Thuram signed with Barcelona for €5 million after Juventus were relegated to Serie B due to the calciopoli scandal.

In Thuram's last season (2007–08), he was the third- or fourth-choice centre-back after Carles Puyol, Gabriel Milito and Rafael Márquez.

On 26 June 2008, he was reported as having signed a one-year contract with an option for another year with Paris Saint-Germain. The deal, however, was cancelled shortly after because he was diagnosed with a heart defect that had caused the death of his brother. On 2 August, he announced his final retirement from professional football due to his condition.

== International career ==
After becoming world champion in 1998, Thuram was part of France's triumph at UEFA Euro 2000, which led to the team being ranked by FIFA as number one from 2001–2002. He also played in the 2002 World Cup, 2006 World Cup, Euro 1996, Euro 2004 and Euro 2008, in addition to winning the 2003 FIFA Confederations Cup. In France's 2–1 group win over England at Euro 2004, Thuram became the third Frenchman to 100 caps, after fellow 1998 champions Didier Deschamps and Marcel Desailly.

=== 1998 World Cup ===
Thuram was named in the French squad for the 1998 World Cup and played a part in their entire tournament. In the semi final against Croatia, after getting caught out of position and being at fault for Croatia's opening goal, Thuram went on to score a brace, his only two international goals, giving France a 2–1 win to take them to the final where the team defeated Brazil 3–0 to win their first World Cup. Thuram was awarded the Bronze Ball as the third most valuable player in the tournament. He, Bixente Lizarazu, Laurent Blanc and Marcel Desailly composed the backbone of the French defence that conceded only two goals in seven matches.

=== 2006 World Cup ===
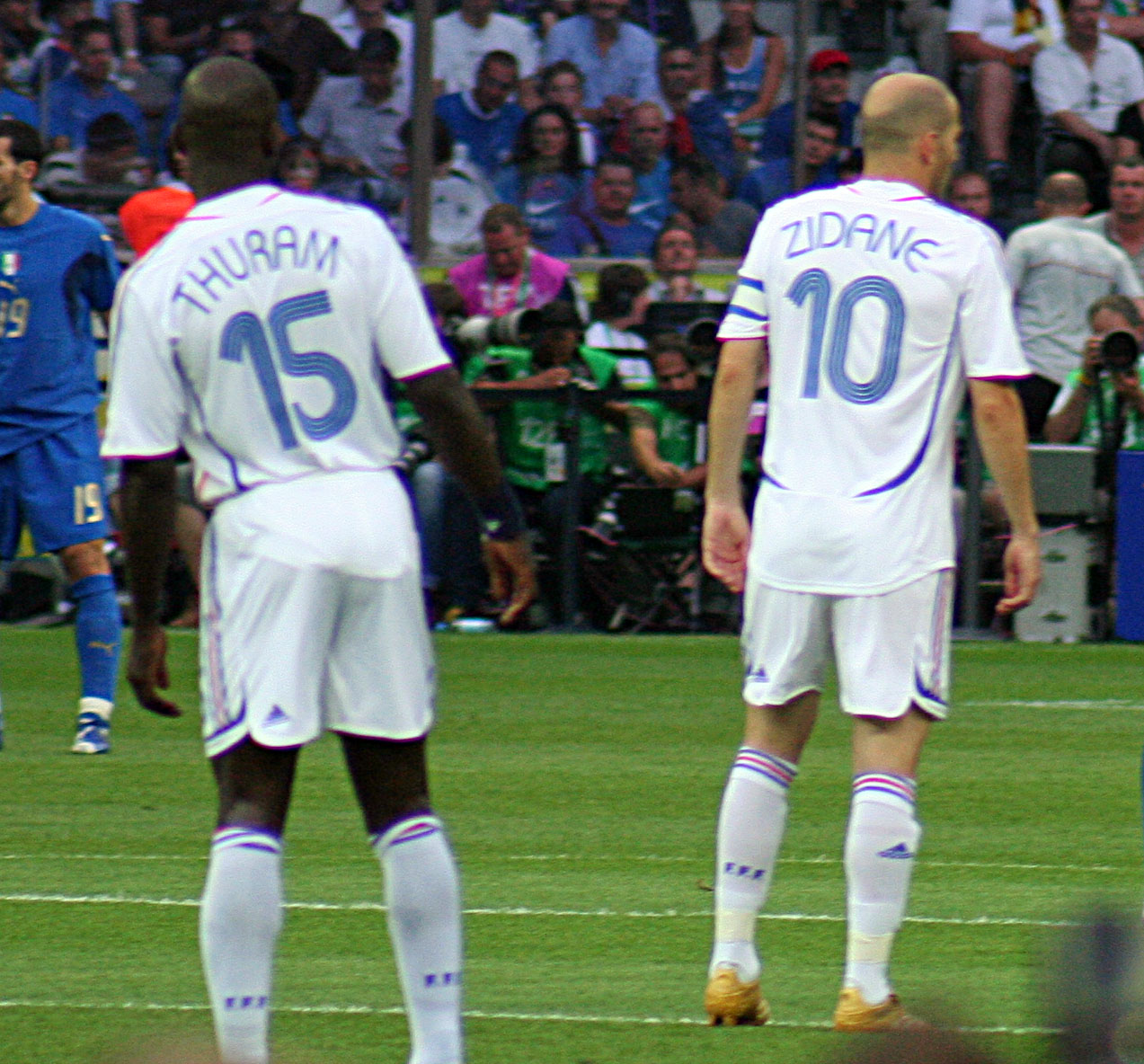
Thuram (left) alongside Zinedine Zidane, playing for France in the 2006 FIFA World Cup final.

After a brief international retirement, France coach Raymond Domenech convinced Thuram to return to the French team on 17 August 2005, along with fellow "Golden Generation" teammates Zinedine Zidane and Claude Makélélé, as Les Bleus struggled to qualify for the 2006 World Cup. Thuram's centre back partnership with William Gallas was to be the foundation for France's progression to the final. Thuram got his 116th cap for France in the group stage match against South Korea in Leipzig on 18 June 2006. In that game he equalled Desailly's record number of caps, which he broke in the final group stage match, a 2–0 win over Togo in Cologne on 23 June 2006, winning his 117th cap. He was named the man of the match in France's semi-final 1–0 victory against Portugal, coincidentally the same distinction he had earned eight years earlier at the semi-finals of the 1998 World Cup.

=== Euro 2008 ===
On 9 June 2008, Thuram took the field against Romania in a group match, and became the first player to make 15 UEFA European Championship finals appearances. The former record of 14 appearances was held by Zinedine Zidane, Luís Figo and Karel Poborský. He played one more game during the tournament, raising the number of his appearances to 16, which record was then equaled a few days later by Edwin van der Sar from the Netherlands in the quarter-finals. Thuram was the captain of France in the tournament. Along with Claude Makélélé, he announced his retirement from international football on 17 June 2008, after France's 2–0 loss to Italy. He finished his career with the national team as France's most capped player with 142 appearances. His record was broken by Hugo Lloris in the quarter-finals of the 2022 FIFA World Cup.

== Style of play ==
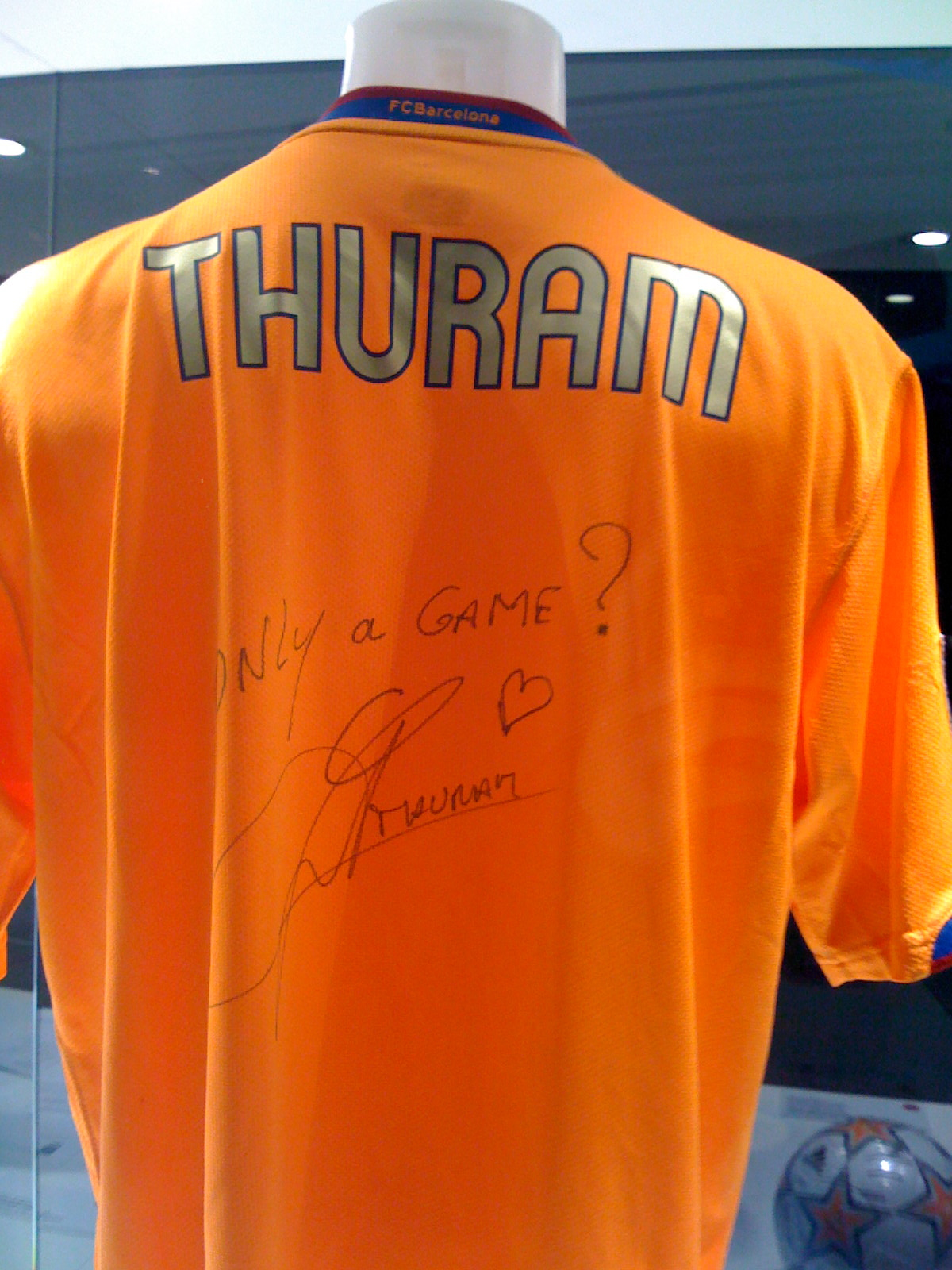
Thuram's signed Barça shirt, on display at the World Museum in Liverpool, 2008

Thuram played primarily as a defender, appearing as both a right-back and centre-back, and was also used in midfield on occasion. FIFA's Technical Study Group selected him as a right full-back in its 1998 World Cup All-Star Team, describing him as physically strong, difficult to beat, and capable of winning the ball from opponents. During his club career, he was used in both central and right-sided defensive roles, and as a full-back, he could move forward from wide positions and contribute crosses.

== Personal life ==
With his first wife, Sandra, Thuram has two sons who are also footballers, Marcus (born 1997) and Khéphren (born 2001), who were named after Jamaican activist Marcus Garvey and Egyptian pharaoh Khephren respectively. Both sons have been capped by France, while Lilian's cousin Yohann Thuram-Ulien has represented Guadeloupe.

From 2007 to 2013, Thuram was in a relationship with Karine Le Marchand, a French TV host. In August 2022 he married journalist Kareen Guiock, whom he met in 2015; they wed at the Palace of Fontainebleau.

== Media ==
Thuram was sponsored by sportswear company Nike and appeared in Nike commercials. In a global Nike advertising campaign in the run-up to the 2002 World Cup in Korea and Japan, he starred in a "Secret Tournament" commercial (branded "Scorpion KO") directed by Terry Gilliam, appearing with football players such as Thierry Henry, Ronaldo, Edgar Davids, Fabio Cannavaro, Francesco Totti, Ronaldinho, Luís Figo and Hidetoshi Nakata, with former player Eric Cantona the tournament "referee".

== Political engagement ==
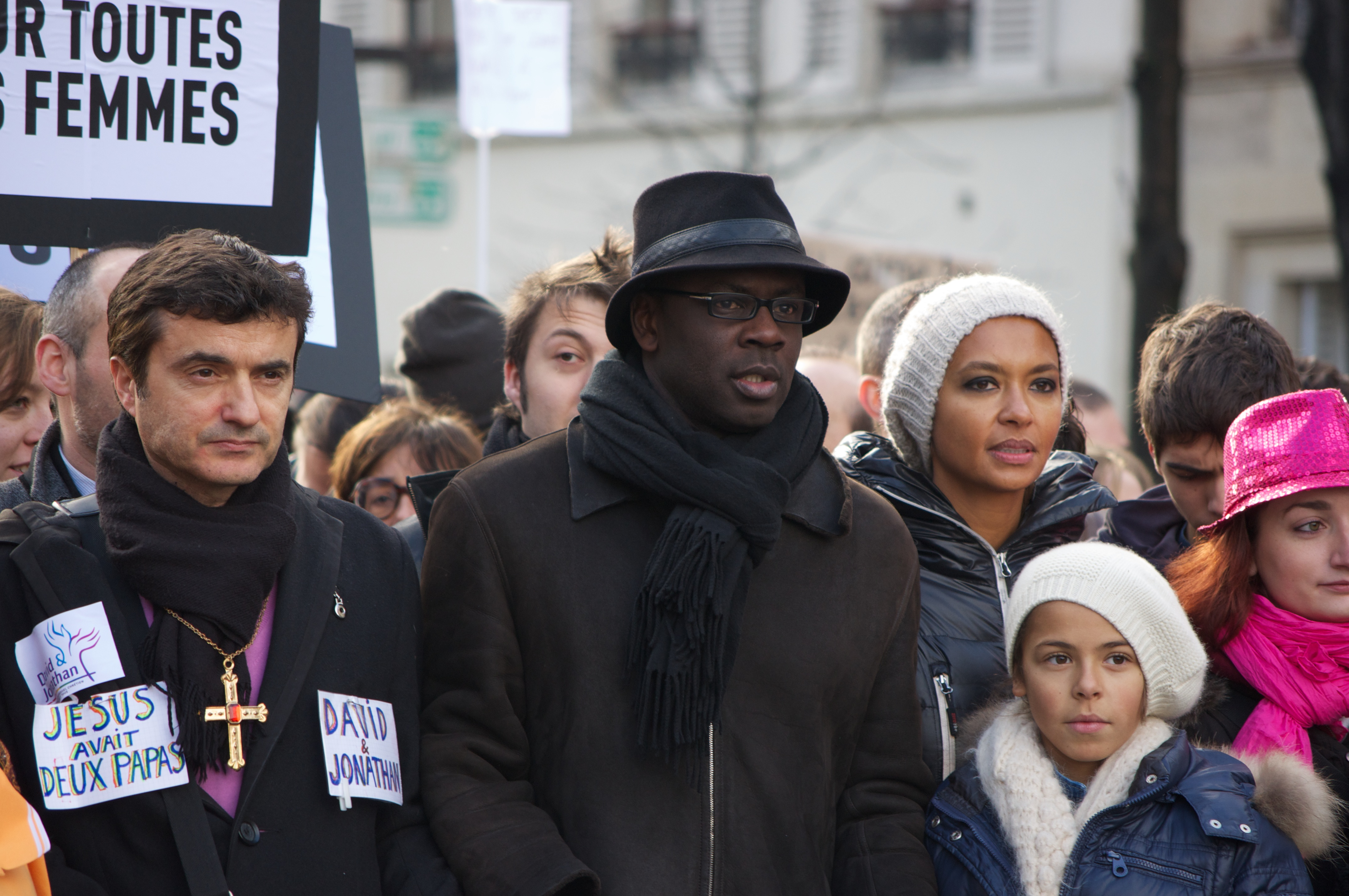
Thuram on a 2013 march through Paris by supporters of same-sex marriage in France.

Beyond his football career, Thuram has shown political engagement, and has spoken out against racism. In such, during the French riots in November 2005, Thuram took a position against future French president Nicolas Sarkozy, at the time the head of the conservative political party UMP and Minister of the Interior. Thuram was opposed to the verbal attacks against young people that the then-Minister made when he talked about the "scum", and he said that Nicolas Sarkozy never lived in a "banlieue", areas of low-income housing surrounding French cities.

On 6 September 2006, Thuram sparked controversy when he invited 80 people, who were expelled by French Minister of the Interior Nicolas Sarkozy from a flat where they lived illegally, to the football match between France and Italy. He has also engaged in campaigns that favour the Catalan language in Northern Catalonia.

In November 2011, Thuram curated an exhibition at the Musée du Quai Branly entitled "Human Zoos: The Invention of the Savage". It examined the human zoos that traced the practice of using colonial subjects as exhibits in zoos and freak shows. The material in the exhibition runs from the parade of Brazil's Tupinamba "savages" for the royal entrance of King Henry II of France in 1550 in Rouen, to the last "living spectacle" of Congo villagers exhibited in Brussels in 1958.

In January 2013, Thuram took part in a march through Paris by supporters of the Ayrault government's plan to legalise same-sex marriage. He had previously explained that he supported same-sex marriage in the name of equal rights (comparing the denial of equality for homosexuals to the denial of equal rights for women and for black people in earlier periods of history), and in the name of France's secular principles (laïcité), rejecting religious arguments against civil marriage. He also expressed support for the right of same-sex couples to adopt children. He founded the Fondation Lilian Thuram, which aims to educate people about racism.

== Career statistics ==
=== Club ===
Appearances and goals by club, season and competition
Club	Season	League			Cup		Continental		Other		Total	
Club	Season	Division	Apps	Goals	Apps	Goals	Apps	Goals	Apps	Goals	Apps	Goals
Monaco	1990–91	Division 1	1	0	0	0	0	0	—		1	0
Monaco	1991–92	Division 1	19	0	4	0	4	0	—		27	0
Monaco	1992–93	Division 1	37	0	2	0	4	0	—		43	0
Monaco	1993–94	Division 1	25	1	3	1	8	1	—		36	3
Monaco	1994–95	Division 1	37	2	2	0	—		3	1	42	3
Monaco	1995–96	Division 1	36	5	3	0	2	0	3	0	44	5
Monaco	Total		155	8	14	1	18	1	6	1	193	11
Parma	1996–97	Serie A	34	1	1	0	2	0	—		37	1
Parma	1997–98	Serie A	32	0	6	0	8	0	—		46	0
Parma	1998–99	Serie A	34	0	8	0	11	0	—		53	0
Parma	1999–2000	Serie A	33	0	2	0	10	0	2 (Note: Appearance in one Champions League Serie A play-off match (2000))	0	47	0
Parma	2000–01	Serie A	30	0	8	0	7	0	—		45	0
Parma	Total		163	1	25	0	38	0	2	0	228	1
Juventus	2001–02	Serie A	30	0	3	0	8	0	—		41	0
Juventus	2002–03	Serie A	27	1	0	0	15	0	1	0	43	1
Juventus	2003–04	Serie A	23	0	4	0	5	0	0	0	32	0
Juventus	2004–05	Serie A	37	0	1	0	11	0	—		49	0
Juventus	2005–06	Serie A	27	0	4	0	8	0	0	0	39	0
Juventus	Total		144	1	12	0	47	0	1	0	204	1
Barcelona	2006–07	La Liga	23	0	2	0	4	0	1	0	30	0
Barcelona	2007–08	La Liga	18	0	4	0	6	0	—		28	0
Barcelona	Total		41	0	6	0	10	0	1	0	58	0
Career total			503	10	57	1	113	1	10	1	683	13

=== International ===
Appearances and goals by national team and year
National team	Year	Apps	Goals
France	1994	1	0
France	1995	5	0
France	1996	13	0
France	1997	8	0
France	1998	16	2
France	1999	9	0
France	2000	14	0
France	2001	4	0
France	2002	12	0
France	2003	12	0
France	2004	9	0
France	2005	7	0
France	2006	16	0
France	2007	10	0
France	2008	6	0
Total		142	2

Scores and results list France's goal tally first, score column indicates score after each Thuram goal.

List of international goals scored by Lilian Thuram
No.	Date	Venue	Opponent	Score	Result	Competition
1	8 July 1998	Stade de France, Saint-Denis, France	Croatia	1–1	2–1	1998 FIFA World Cup
2	8 July 1998	Stade de France, Saint-Denis, France	Croatia	2–1	2–1	1998 FIFA World Cup

== Honours ==
Monaco

- Coupe de France: 1990–91

Parma

- Coppa Italia: 1998–99
- Supercoppa Italiana: 1999
- UEFA Cup: 1998–99

Juventus

- Serie A: 2001–02, 2002–03
- Supercoppa Italiana: 2002

Barcelona

- Supercopa de España: 2006

France

- FIFA World Cup: 1998, runner-up: 2006
- UEFA European Championship: 2000
- FIFA Confederations Cup: 2003

Individual

- Onze de Onze: 1996, 1997, 1998, 1999, 2000, 2001, 2003, 2006
- French Player of the Year: 1997
- Guerin d'Oro: 1997
- FIFA World Cup Bronze Ball: 1998
- FIFA World Cup All-Star Team: 1998, 2006
- ESM Team of the Year: 1998–99, 2002–03
- UEFA European Championship Teams of the Tournament: 2000
- FIFA 100: 2004
- FIFPro World XI: 2006
- Trophée d'honneur UNFP: 2009
- Équipe type spéciale 20 ans des trophées UNFP: 2011

Orders

- Knight of the Legion of Honour: 1998
- Officer of the Legion of Honour: 2013

== See also ==
- List of men's footballers with 100 or more international caps
- List of French footballers in Serie A
- List of foreign La Liga players
