= Michael Czyborra =

German footballer (born 1997)

Personal information
- Full name: Michael-Junior Czyborra
- Date of birth: 24 July 1997 (age 29)
- Place of birth: Berlin, Germany
- Height: 1.78 m (5 ft 10 in)
- Position: Defender

Team information
- Current team: VSG Altglienicke
- Number: 2

Youth career
- –2010: Union Berlin
- 2010–2016: Energie Cottbus

Senior career*
Years	Team	Apps	(Gls)
2016–2017	Energie Cottbus	5	(0)
2017–	VSG Altglienicke	42	(0)
- * Club domestic league appearances and goals as of 20:16, 28 July 2020 (UTC)

Michael-Junior Czyborra (born 24 July 1997) is a German footballer who plays as a defender for VSG Altglienicke.

== Career ==
Czyborra made his professional debut for Energie Cottbus in the 3. Liga on 22 April 2016, coming on as a substitute in the 68th minute for Felix Geisler before being taken off in the 90+2nd minute for Malte Karbstein in the 1–0 away win against VfB Stuttgart II.

== Personal life ==
Czyborra's brother, Lennart, is also a professional footballer.
