= Jamie Lawrence (footballer, born 2002) =

German footballer (born 2002)

Personal information
- Date of birth: 10 November 2002 (age 23)
- Place of birth: Munich, Germany
- Height: 2.01 m (6 ft 7 in)
- Position: Centre-back

Team information
- Current team: OH Leuven

Youth career
- –2017: SC Fortuna Kirchheim
- 2017–2021: Bayern Munich

Senior career*
Years	Team	Apps	(Gls)
2020–2024	Bayern Munich II	60	(5)
2022–2024	Bayern Munich	0	(0)
2022–2024	→ 1. FC Magdeburg (loan)	36	(0)
2024–2026	WSG Tirol	60	(5)
2026–	OH Leuven	0	(0)

International career^{‡}
2019	Germany U17	2	(0)
2021–2023	Germany U20	14	(0)
- * Club domestic league appearances and goals as of 00:56, 23 May 2026 (UTC) ‡ National team caps and goals as of 21 November 2022

Jamie Lawrence (born 10 November 2002) is a German professional footballer who plays as a centre-back for Belgian Pro League club Oud-Heverlee Leuven.

He began his senior career with Bayern Munich II, where he made 60 appearances between 2020 and 2022. A two-year loan spell in the 2. Bundesliga with 1. FC Magdeburg followed before joining Austrian Bundesliga club WSG Tirol in summer 2024.

== Club career ==
=== Bayern Munich ===
Lawrence was born in Munich, Germany, and grew up on the east side of the city. He played youth football initially with Kirchheimer SC before joining Bayern Munich's academy in 2017. Bayern Munich's basketball team were also interested in Lawrence, and he had trained with them before committing solely to football, though his younger brothers Alec and Lenny continued to play basketball with Bayern.

In January 2020, Lawrence agreed a contract with the club valid until summer 2022. He was promoted to the club's reserve team for the 2020–21 3. Liga and made 28 appearances, scoring once, as the club were relegated to the Regionalliga Bayern after a 17th-place finish. He agreed a new three-year contract with the club in summer 2021, with academy manager Jochen Sauer saying that "Jamie has become a permanent fixture in our under-23 team" (Note: In original German language source, "Jamie ist zur festen Größe in unserer U 23 geworden") and that "we are convinced of his potential for further development". (Note: In original German language source, "Wir sind überzeugt von seinem weiteren Entwicklungspotenzial") He made 32 appearances and scored four goals in the 2021–22 Regionalliga Bayern.

==== Loan to 1. FC Magdeburg ====
In June 2022, Bayern extended Lawrence's contract to summer 2026, and he joined 2. Bundesliga club 1. FC Magdeburg on a two-year long loan deal. Lawrence had a poor start to the 2022–23 season for Magdeburg, being sent off twice in his first five appearances, and was used only as a substitute for the rest of the first half of the season. His performances improved as the season progressed, and he returned to the starting line-up in March 2023, and remained a regular starter until the end of the season. He made twenty-five 2. Bundesliga appearances in the 2022–23 season, 17 of which came as starts, and he played eleven 2. Bundesliga matches the following season, with 8 of them coming as starts.

=== WSG Tirol ===
On 2 July 2024, Lawrence signed for Austrian Bundesliga club WSG Tirol. He made 28 league appearances, scoring three goals, across the 2024–25 season. He has become a key player for WSG Tirol during his time with the club and played every minute during the first half of the 2025–26 Austrian Bundesliga.

== International career ==
Born in Germany, Lawrence is of Nigerian descent. He is a German youth international, having made two appearances for the under-17s and fourteen for the under-20s.

== Career statistics ==
As of match played 16 May 2026

Appearances and goals by club, season and competition
Club	Season	League			Cup (Note: Includes DFB-Pokal, Austrian Cup)		Other		Total	
Club	Season	Division	Apps	Goals	Apps	Goals	Apps	Goals	Apps	Goals
Bayern Munich II	2020–21	3. Liga	28	1	—		—		28	1
Bayern Munich II	2021–22	Regionalliga Bayern	32	4	—		—		32	4
Bayern Munich II	Total		60	5	0	0	0	0	60	5
1. FC Magdeburg (loan)	2022–23	2. Bundesliga	25	0	1	0	—		26	0
1. FC Magdeburg (loan)	2023–24	2. Bundesliga	11	0	1	0	—		12	0
1. FC Magdeburg (loan)	Total		36	0	2	0	0	0	38	0
WSG Tirol	2024–25	Austrian Bundesliga	28	3	3	0	—		31	3
WSG Tirol	2025–26	Austrian Bundesliga	32	2	3	0	—		35	2
WSG Tirol	Total		60	5	6	0	0	0	66	5
Career total			156	10	8	0	0	0	164	10
