= France national football team records and statistics =

This list of France national football team records contains statistical accomplishments related to the France national football team (French: Equipe de France), its players, and its managers. The France national team represents the nation of France in international football. It is fielded by the French Football Federation (French: Fédération Française de Football) and competes as a member of UEFA.

== Individual records ==
=== Player records ===
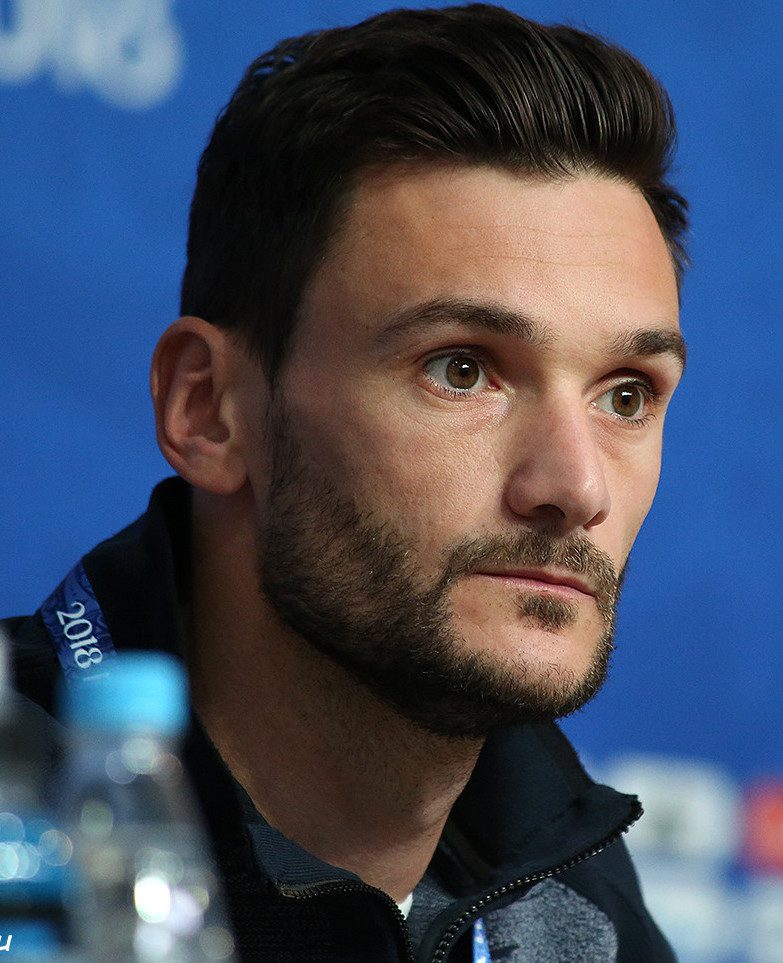
Hugo Lloris is the most-capped French international, having appeared in 145 matches, and captained the national team a record 121 times.

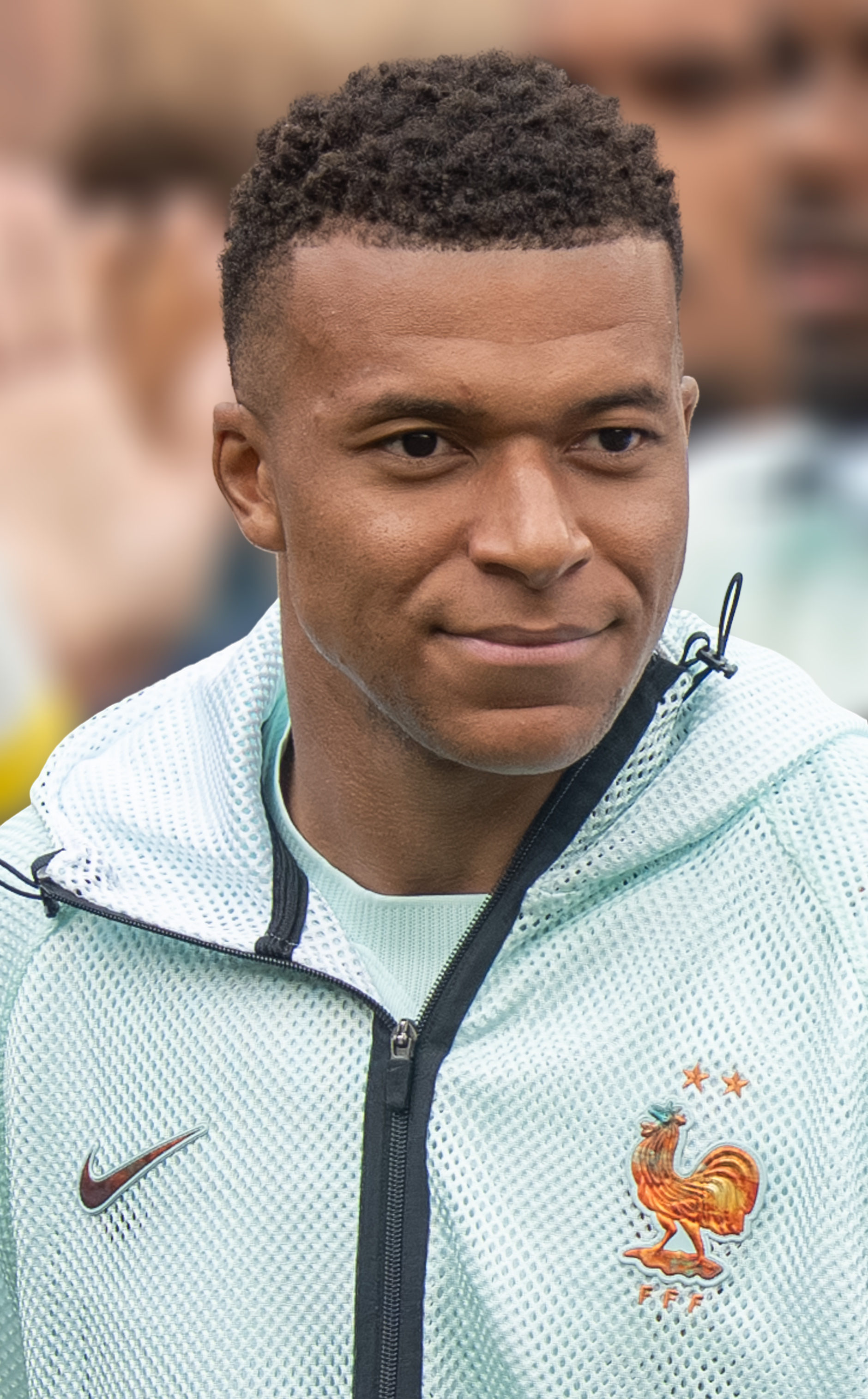
Kylian Mbappé is France's record goalscorer, having recorded 66 goals.

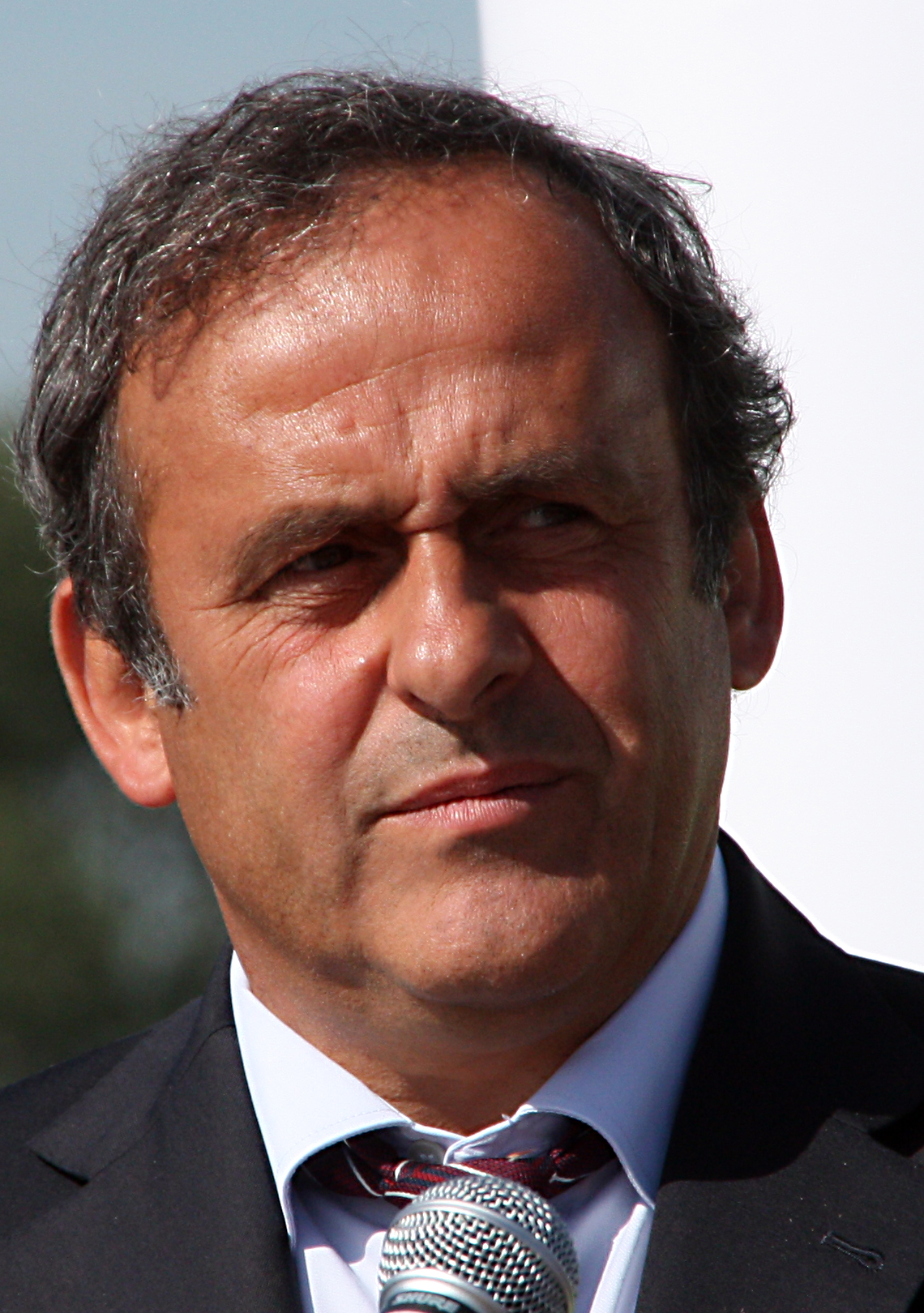
Michel Platini scored a record nine goals at UEFA Euro 1984.

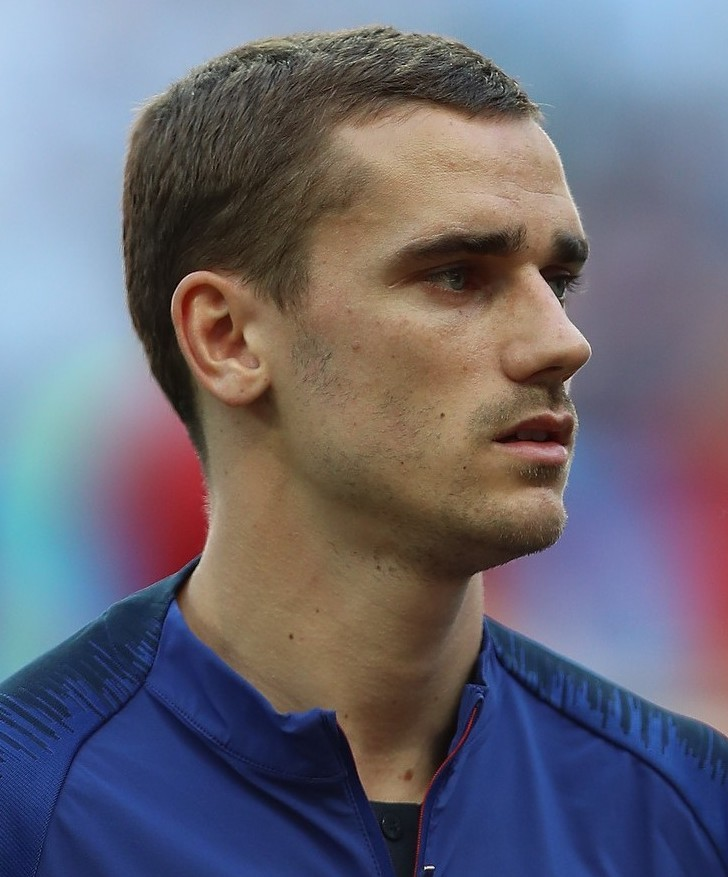
Antoine Griezmann has the most appearances on aggregate at the World Cup and European Championship with 36.

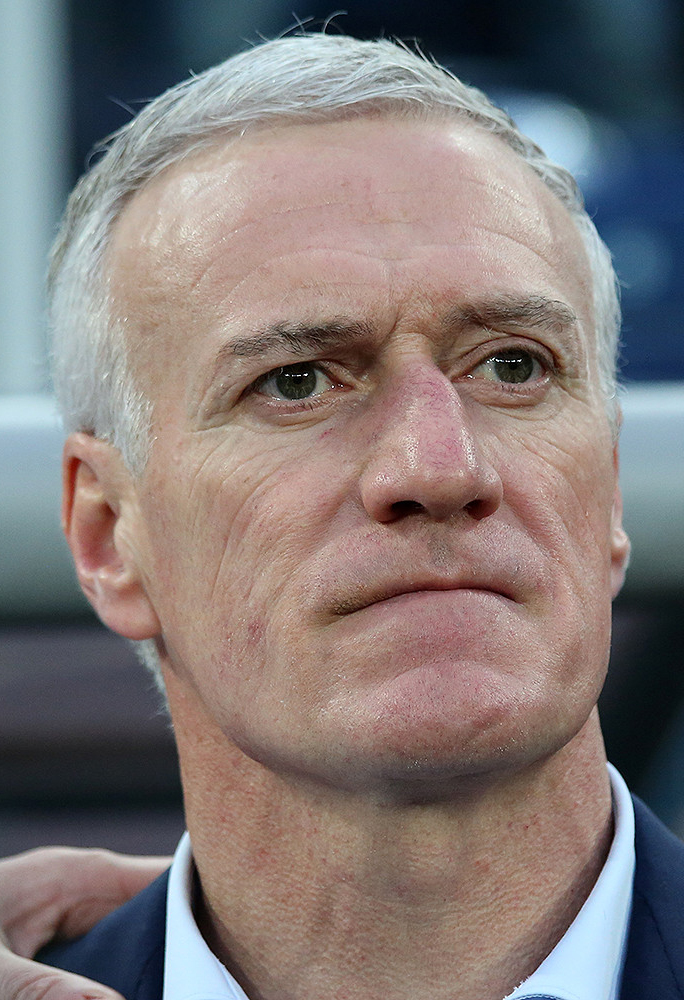
Didier Deschamps has managed France to a record 185 matches and 120 victories.

Most appearances
Hugo Lloris, 145, 19 November 2008 — 18 December 2022

Other centurions
Lilian Thuram, 142, 17 August 1994 — 13 June 2008
Olivier Giroud, 137, 11 November 2011 — 9 July 2024
Antoine Griezmann, 137, 5 March 2014 — 9 September 2024
Thierry Henry, 123, 11 October 1997 — 22 June 2010
Marcel Desailly, 116, 22 August 1993 — 17 June 2004
Zinedine Zidane, 108, 17 August 1994 — 9 July 2006
Patrick Vieira, 107, 26 February 1997 — 2 June 2009
Kylian Mbappé, 106, 25 March 2017 — present
Didier Deschamps, 103, 29 October 1989 — 2 September 2000

Most appearances as a captain
Hugo Lloris, 121, 17 November 2010 — 18 December 2022

Most goals
Kylian Mbappé, 66, 2017 — present

Longest France career
Karim Benzema, 15 years, 86 days, 28 March 2007 — 13 June 2022

Shortest France career
Franck Jurietti, 5 seconds, 12 October 2005 v. Cyprus

Oldest player
Olivier Giroud, 37 years and 279 days, 9 July 2024 v. Spain

Youngest player
Félix Vial, 17 years and 75 days, 29 October 1911 v. Luxembourg

Most appearances at the World Cup finals
Kylian Mbappé, 22, 16 June 2018 — 18 July 2026

Appearances at four World Cup final tournaments
Thierry Henry, 1998, 2002, 2006, and 2010
Hugo Lloris, 2010, 2014, 2018, and 2022

Most goals scored at the World Cup finals
Kylian Mbappé, 22, 21 June 2018 — 18 July 2026

Youngest goalscorer at the World Cup finals
Kylian Mbappé, 19 years and six months, 21 June 2018 v. Peru.

Most appearances at the European Championship finals
Antoine Griezmann, 17, 10 June 2016 — 9 July 2024

Appearances at four European Championship final tournaments
Lilian Thuram, 1996, 2000, 2004, and 2008
Hugo Lloris, 2008, 2012, 2016, and 2020
Olivier Giroud, 2012, 2016, 2020, and 2024

Most goals scored at the European Championship finals
Michel Platini, 9, 12 June 1984 — 27 June 1984

Most appearances on aggregate at the World Cup and European Championship finals
Antoine Griezmann, 36, 15 June 2014 — 9 July 2024

Most appearances at the FIFA Confederations Cup finals
Sylvain Wiltord, 10, 30 May 2001 — 29 June 2003
Robert Pires, 10, 30 May 2001 — 29 June 2003

Appearances in three different decades
Julien Darui, 1930s, 1940s, 1950s
Robert Jonquet, 1940s, 1950s, 1960s
Henri Michel, 1960s, 1970s, 1980s
Laurent Blanc, 1980s, 1990s, 2000s
Didier Deschamps, 1980s, 1990s, 2000s
Thierry Henry, 1990s, 2000s, 2010s
Nicolas Anelka, 1990s, 2000s, 2010s
Hugo Lloris, 2000s, 2010s, 2020s
Steve Mandanda, 2000s, 2010s, 2020s
Karim Benzema, 2000s, 2010s, 2020s

=== Manager records ===
Most matches as coach
Didier Deschamps, 185, 8 July 2012 — 18 July 2026

Most matches won as coach
120 by Didier Deschamps

Most matches drawn as coach
35 by Didier Deschamps

Most matches lost as coach
30 by Didier Deschamps

== Team records ==
Largest victory
14–0, France – Gibraltar, 18 November 2023

Largest away victory
0–7, Cyprus – France, 11 October 1980

Largest defeat
17–1, Denmark – France, 22 October 1908

Largest home defeat
0–15, France – England Amateur, 1 November 1906

Largest goals in a single halftime
7–0, France – Gibraltar, 18 November 2023

Most consecutive victories
13, 29 March 2003 — 18 February 2004

Most consecutive matches without a defeat
30, 16 February 1994 — 9 October 1996

Most consecutive defeats
12, 23 March 1908 — 23 March 1911

Most consecutive matches without a victory
15, 23 March 1908 — 30 April 1911

Longest period without conceding a goal
11 matches (1,140 minutes), 29 June 2003 — 6 June 2004

Highest home attendance
80,051, France – Ukraine, 2 June 2007

Highest away attendance
125,631, Scotland – France, 27 April 1949
