= Lennart Czyborra =

German footballer (born 1999)

Personal information
- Full name: Lennart-Marten Quint Czyborra
- Date of birth: 3 May 1999 (age 27)
- Place of birth: Berlin, Germany
- Height: 1.81 m (5 ft 11 in)
- Position: Left-back

Team information
- Current team: VSG Altglienicke
- Number: 3

Youth career
- 2012–2015: Energie Cottbus
- 2015–2018: Schalke 04

Senior career*
Years	Team	Apps	(Gls)
2018–2020	Heracles Almelo	39	(2)
2020–2021	Atalanta	1	(0)
2020–2021	→ Genoa (loan)	17	(1)
2021–2025	Genoa	3	(0)
2021–2022	→ Arminia Bielefeld (loan)	4	(0)
2023–2024	→ PEC Zwolle (loan)	5	(0)
2024–2025	→ WSG Tirol (loan)	20	(0)
2025–2026	Miedź Legnica	9	(0)
2026	Miedź Legnica II	2	(1)
2026–	VSG Altglienicke	8	(0)

International career
2016–2017	Germany U18	6	(0)
2018	Germany U19	1	(0)
2018–2019	Germany U20	6	(1)
- * Club domestic league appearances and goals as of 23 September 2026

Lennart-Marten Quint Czyborra (born 3 May 1999) is a German professional footballer who plays as a left-back for Regionalliga Nordost club VSG Altglienicke.

== Club career ==
Lennart Czyborra played in the youth sides 1. FV Eintracht Wandlitz, FV Motor Eberswalde, Union Berlin, Hertha BSC, Energie Cottbus and Schalke 04. In 2018 he left for Heracles Almelo. He made his Eredivisie debut on 11 August 2018 in a 1–1 draw against AFC Ajax. He came into the field in the 82nd minute for Bart van Hintum.

On 22 January 2020, Czyborra signed with Italian Serie A club Atalanta. He made his club debut on 14 July in a 6–2 win against Brescia. On 9 September 2020, he joined Genoa on a two-year loan deal with obligation to buy.

On 8 July 2023, Czyborra joined PEC Zwolle in the Netherlands on loan. In July 2024, he joined Austrian Bundesliga club WSG Tirol on a season-long loan deal.

On 11 September 2025, Czyborra moved to Polish club Miedź Legnica as a free agent, signing a two-year deal.

In June 2026, Czyborra returned to Germany to sign with Regionalliga Nordost club VSG Altglienicke.

== Personal life ==
Czyborra's brother, Michael, is also a professional footballer.

== Career statistics ==
As of match played 12 April 2026

Appearances and goals by club, season and competition
Club	Season	League			National cup (Note: Includes KNVB Cup, Coppa Italia, DFB-Pokal, Austrian Cup)		Europe		Other		Total	
Club	Season	Division	Apps	Goals	Apps	Goals	Apps	Goals	Apps	Goals	Apps	Goals
Heracles Almelo	2018–19	Eredivisie	20	0	2	0	—		2 (Note: Appearances in Eredivisie European play-offs)	0	24	0
Heracles Almelo	2019–20	Eredivisie	19	2	2	0	—		—		21	2
Heracles Almelo	Total		39	2	4	0	—		2	0	45	2
Atalanta	2019–20	Serie A	1	0	0	0	0	0	—		1	0
Genoa (loan)	2020–21	Serie A	17	1	2	1	—		—		19	2
Genoa	2021–22	Serie A	0	0	0	0	—		—		0	0
Genoa	2022–23	Serie B	3	0	2	0	—		—		5	0
Genoa	Total		20	1	4	1	—		—		24	2
Arminia Bielefeld (loan)	2021–22	Bundesliga	4	0	1	0	—		—		5	0
PEC Zwolle (loan)	2023–24	Eredivisie	5	0	1	0	—		—		6	0
WSG Tirol (loan)	2024–25	Austrian Bundesliga	20	0	1	0	—		—		21	0
Miedź Legnica	2025–26	I liga	7	0	2	0	—		—		9	0
Miedź Legnica II	2025–26	III liga, group III	2	1	—		—		—		2	1
VSG Altglienicke	2026–27	Regionalliga Nordost	0	0	—		—		0	0	0	0
Career total			98	4	13	1	0	0	2	0	113	5

== Honours ==
Individual

- Eredivisie Talent of the Month: October 2019
