= Fallou Njie =

Gambian footballer

Personal information
- Date of birth: 5 January 1999 (age 27)
- Place of birth: Banjul, The Gambia
- Height: 1.86 m (6 ft 1 in)
- Position: Defender

Youth career
- 2019: Genoa

Senior career*
Years	Team	Apps	(Gls)
2017–2018	Chieri	9	(1)
2018–2022	Genoa	0	(0)
2018–2019	→ Arezzo (loan)	0	(0)
2019–2020	→ Avellino (loan)	5	(0)
2021	→ Skënderbeu (loan)	2	(0)
- * Club domestic league appearances and goals as of 26 May 2021

Fallou Njie (born 5 January 1999) is a Gambian football player.

== Club career ==
He started his senior career in Italy on 7 December 2017, signing with Serie D club Chieri.

In the summer of 2018, he signed with Serie A club Genoa and was loaned to Arezzo in Serie C. He returned to Genoa in January 2019 without making any appearances for Arezzo and played for Genoa's Under-19 squad for the remainder of the season.

On 9 August 2019, he joined another Serie C club Avellino on a season-long loan. He made his professional Serie C debut for Avellino on 6 October 2019 in a game against Rende. He started the game and was substituted at half-time.
