= Tobias Anselm =

Austrian footballer (born 2000)

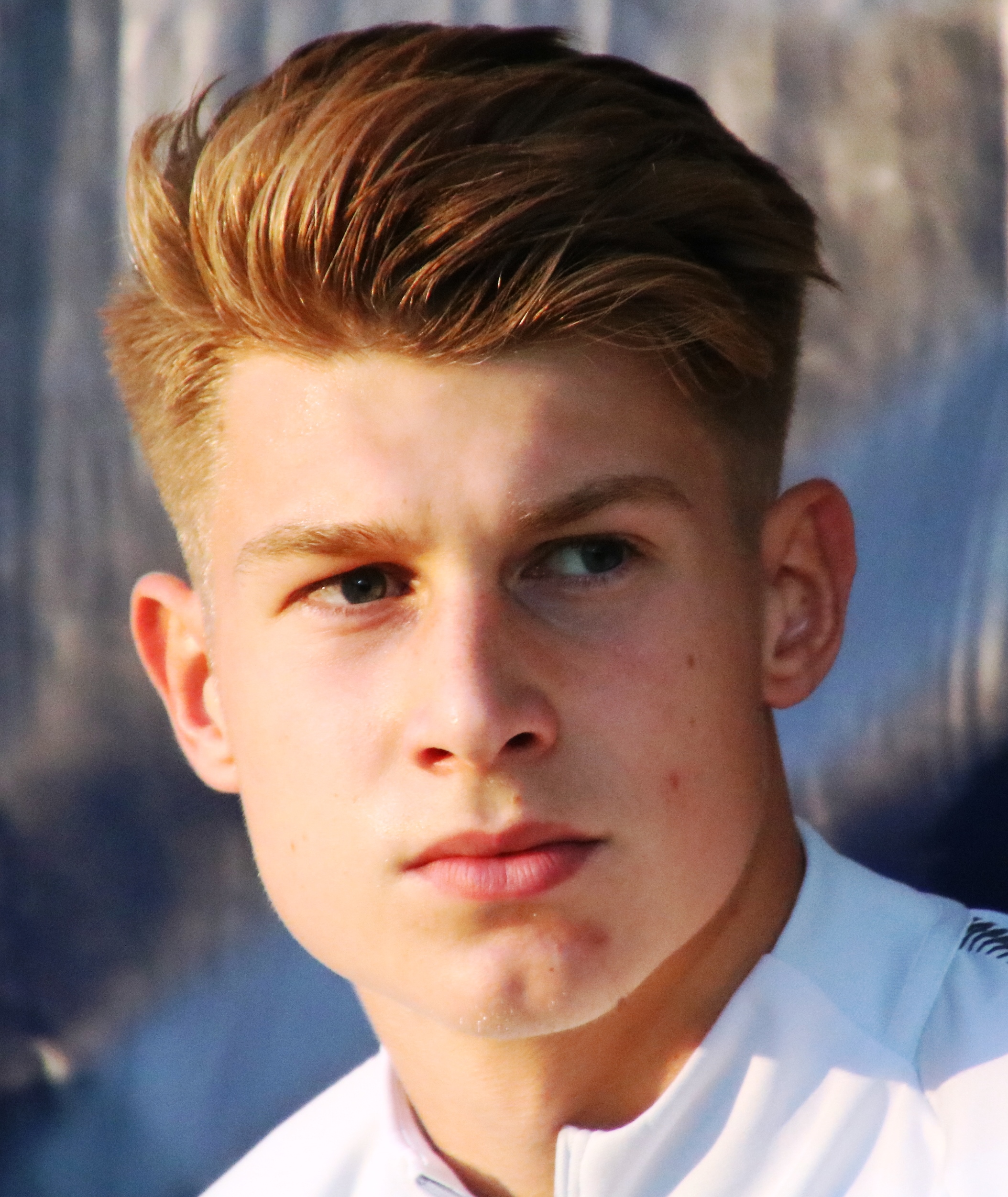
- Anselm in 2017

Personal information
- Date of birth: 24 February 2000 (age 26)
- Height: 1.86 m (6 ft 1 in)
- Position: Midfielder

Team information
- Current team: First Vienna
- Number: 10

Youth career
- 2005–2011: SV Kirchbichl
- 2011–2013: FC Kufstein
- 2013–2019: FC Red Bull Salzburg

Senior career*
Years	Team	Apps	(Gls)
2017–2020	FC Liefering	44	(9)
2020–2024	LASK	0	(0)
2020–2022	→ WSG Tirol (loan)	34	(7)
2024	→ Viktoria Köln (loan)	10	(2)
2024–2026	WSG Tirol	39	(3)
2026–	First Vienna	2	(0)

International career^{‡}
2014–2015	Austria U-15	7	(1)
2015	Austria U-16	2	(2)
2018	Austria U-19	5	(1)
2021	Austria U-21	3	(4)
- * Club domestic league appearances and goals as of 16 August 2026 ‡ National team caps and goals as of 7 September 2021

Tobias Anselm (born 24 February 2000) is an Austrian professional footballer who plays for 2. Liga club First Vienna.

== Club career ==
Anselm made his Austrian Football First League debut for FC Liefering on 22 September 2017 in a game against FC Blau-Weiß Linz.

On 27 August 2020, he joined WSG Swarovski Tirol on a season-long loan.

In January 2024, Anselm joined German 3. Liga club Viktoria Köln on loan until the end of the season.

On 17 June 2024, Anselm returned to WSG Tirol on a long-term contract.
