= Steeve-Mike Eboa Ebongue =

French footballer (born 2001)

Personal information
- Date of birth: 20 February 2001 (age 25)
- Place of birth: France
- Height: 1.80 m (5 ft 11 in)
- Position: Midfielder

Team information
- Current team: Foggia
- Number: 11

Youth career
- 2017–2019: Bordeaux II
- 2019–2021: Genoa Primavera

Senior career*
Years	Team	Apps	(Gls)
2020–2022	Genoa	3	(0)
2021–2022	→ Cosenza (loan)	4	(0)
2022	→ Siena (loan)	0	(0)
2022–2023	Rimini	6	(0)
2023–2024	Giugliano	13	(0)
2024	Barletta	2	(0)
2026–	Foggia	5	(0)
- * Club domestic league appearances and goals as of 1 May 2026

Steeve-Mike Eboa Ebongue (born 20 February 2001), known as Steeve-Mike Eyango, is a French professional footballer who plays as a midfielder for Serie C club Foggia.

== Career ==
Eboa Ebongue came through the Bordeaux youth system, before joining Genoa on 2 September 2019. He made his Serie A debut on 19 October 2020 in a 0–0 draw against Hellas Verona.

On 31 August 2021, he joined Cosenza on a season-long loan.

On 31 January 2022, the loan was terminated early. On the same day he went to Siena on loan.

On 3 September 2022, Steeve-Mike signed with Rimini.

On 11 January 2023, Steeve-Mike moved to Giugliano, also in Serie C.

== Career statistics ==
As of match played 23 October 2021

Appearances and goals by club, season and competition
Club	Season	League	League		Cup		Europe		Other		Total	
Club	Season	League	Apps	Goals	Apps	Goals	Apps	Goals	Apps	Goals	Apps	Goals
Genoa	2020–21	Serie A	3	0	1	0	–		–		4	0
Cosenza (loan)	2021–22	Serie B	4	0	0	0	–		–		4	0
Siena (loan)	2021–22	Serie C	0	0	0	0	–		–		0	0
Career total			7	0	1	0	0	0	0	0	8	0
